= Mo Donegal =

Winning racehorse

- Sire: Uncle Mo
- Grandsire: Indian Charlie
- Dam: Callingmissbrown
- Damsire: Pulpit
- Sex: Stallion
- Foaled: April 19, 2019 (age 6)
- Country: United States
- Color: Bay
- Breeder: Ashview Farm & Colts Neck Stables
- Owner: Donegal Racing & Repole Stable (after 29 April 2022)
- Trainer: Todd Pletcher
- Record: 7:4-0-2
- Earnings: $1,511,800

Major wins
- Remsen Stakes (2021); Wood Memorial (2022) American Triple Crown wins: Belmont Stakes (2022)
- Last updated on June 11, 2022

Mo Donegal (born on April 19, 2019) is a retired American Thoroughbred racehorse that won the 2022 Belmont Stakes horse race. The horse is owned by Donegal Racing and Repole Stable.

== Background ==
Mo Donegal is named for his sire the champion horse Uncle Mo and the horse's co-owner Donegal racing.

Mo Donegal is a bay stallion bred by Ashview Farm and Colts Neck Farm and consigned to the Keeneland sale by Ashview Farm. Mo Donegal is the second of three foals by Callingmissbrown and her lone stakes winner to date. She also has a 2-year-old Into Mischief filly named Prank, who sold for $500,000 by agent Frank Brothers, from Ashview's consignment at the 2021 Keeneland September Yearling Sale. Jerry Crawford, CEO of Donegal Racing bought Mo Donegal for $250,000 at the 2020 Keeneland September Yearling Sale and he was named later. Prior to the running of the 2022 Kentucky Derby Mike Repole spent to buy a 25% share of Mo Donegal.

== Racing career ==
=== 2021: two-year-old season ===
Mo Donegal began his racing career on 30 September in a Maiden Special Weight event over 6 1/2 furlongs at Belmont Park. Starting at odds of over 9/1 in a field of seven Mo Donegal broke slowly, was urged by jockey Javier Castellano along while dropping well off the pace. He was steadied briefly with the 1/2 mile to run, and was guided from the rail to the two path before the five-sixteenths, was driven four wide into upper stretch. drifted out some in the final furlong and finished with late energy to secure the third place beaten by first time starter Varatti by 5 1/4 lengths.

Returning to Belmont Park on 21 October to run over a longer distance of 1 1/16 miles, Mo Donegal once again broke a step slow, settling off the early pace. He came under urging late from jockey Irad Ortiz Jr on the backstretch and the moved from three to five wide on the turn, chasing leader Fromanothamutha. Mo Donegal passed the leader outside near the sixteenth-pole and broke his maiden under strong urging by 1 1/2 lengths in a time of 1:44.50.

In his last start of the year trainer Todd Pletcher entered Mo Donegal in the premier long-distance event for two-years-old in the US, the Grade II Remsen Stakes at Aqueduct Racetrack. The event turned into a dog-fight between favorite Zandon and Mo Donegal who was the second pick that needed stewards intervention to dismiss a lodged protest by jockey John Velazquez of Zandon. Mo Donegal dueled down the stretch with Zandon, finishing a nose in front, but only after the two horses and their riders competed in tight quarters late. Mo Donegal drifted inward from the center of the track under right-handed urging from winning jockey Irad Ortiz Jr, who nearing the wire, threw crosses with his left rein. He appeared to make contact with Zandon or that one's rider, John Velazquez. The two horses also bumped just before the wire. They finished 9 3/4 lengths clear of third-place finisher Midnight Chrome 1 1/8 miles on a fast track in 1:53.61. Owners Donegal Racing won their second Remsen after first victorious in 2011 with the Dale Romans-trained O'Prado Again, while Todd Pletcher tallied his third victory in the event.

=== 2022: three-year-old season ===
Mo Donegal began his three-year-old season in South Florida at Gulfstream Park in Grade III Holy Bull Stakes on 5 February. Starting as the 8/5 favorite Mo Donegal broke slowly, saved ground recovering to midpack early, moved out four wide idling a bit under pressure approaching the stretch, had a mild late surge on the far outside and finished third by 4 1/2 lengths to White Abarrio in a time of 1:42 4/5. Todd Pletcher after the event said, "I was happy with the way he closed. It actually kind of hurt us that second placed Simplification didn't break well because it kind of altered the fractions of the race and there wasn't a whole lot of pace on, and that's always a disadvantage at Gulfstream." Mo Donegal was supposed to target the Fountain of Youth Stakes but a fever forced Pletcher to change plans.

Todd Pletcher shipped Mo Donegal back to New York State where he had been successful. On April 9 Mo Donegal ran in the Grade II Wood Memorial at Aqueduct where he was victorious as a two-year-old. Facing seven other three-year-olds broke near the back while carried in a bit. After rallying from last in the field of eight and erasing pacesetting Early Voting's two-length lead at the eighth pole, Mo Donegal picked up 100 qualifying points on the Road to the Kentucky Derby to vault into fourth in points with 112 and was assured for a start toward the May 7 opening leg of the Triple Crown.

With 112 qualifying points on the Road to the Kentucky Derby Mo Donegal figured to be one of the chance to win the Kentucky Derby. Starting at odds of 10/1 Mo Donegal drew Post 1 as on habit broke awkwardly and was away behind the field. He was unhurried toward the inside near the back of the pack by jockey Irad Ortiz Jr. He was forced out ten wide leaving the second turn and was making up ground far too late finishing nearly 4 lengths in fifth place behind shock winner Rich Strike. Connections decided to pass up on the Preakness Stakes, second leg of the Triple Crown.

On 11 June, Mo Donegal was entered to the Belmont Stakes and faced his stablemate, the filly Nest and 2022 Kentucky Derby winner Rich Strike and five other horses. Mo Donegal was selected as the fourth pick in the field starting at odds of just over 5/1.

Mo Donegal coaxed from the gate, went two to three wide through the opening bend before settling three wide in pursuit down the backstretch in mid pack. Jockey Irad Ortiz Jr swung the colt four wide into upper stretch with dead aim on the leaders We The People and Skippylongstocking, taking over the lead three-sixteenths from home, edged clear under a drive shying out under a left handed stick 100 yards from home defeating his Nest by three lengths in a time of 2:28.28. Mike Repole who bought 25% share of Mo Donegal managed to score an exacta with Nest in second. In winning a fourth Belmont, Todd Pletcher achieved the feat for the fourth time with a horse who ran on Kentucky Derby weekend and then receiving a five weeks rest before winning the event.

Donegal Racing announced in early July that Mo Donegal left the Belmont with a bone bruising and would be out of training for 60 days. Trainer Todd Pletcher said the injury would prevent Mo Donegal from running in the Breeders' Cup Classic at Keeneland. The timing of the injury would ultimately lead to the horse's retirement.

== Statistics ==
Rich Strike race statistics
Date	Distance	Race	Grade	Track	Odds	Field	Finish	Winning time	Winning (Losing) margin	Jockey	Ref
2021 – Two-year-old season
Sep 30, 2021	6 1/2 furlongs	Maiden Special Weight		Belmont Park	9.40	7	3	1:17.19	(5 1/4 lengths)	Javier Castellano	
Oct 21, 2021	1 1/16 miles	Maiden Special Weight		Belmont Park	1.35*	9	1	1:44.50	1 1/2 lengths	Irad Ortiz Jr	
Dec 4, 2021	1 1/8 miles	Remsen Stakes	II	Aqueduct	1.45	8	1	1:53.61	Nose	Irad Ortiz Jr	
2022 – Three-year-old season
Feb 5, 2022	1 1/16 miles	Holy Bull Stakes	III	Gulfstream Park	1.70*	9	3	1:42.80	(4 1/2 lengths)	Irad Ortiz Jr	
Apr 9, 2022	1 1/8 miles	Wood Memorial	II	Aqueduct	2.15	8	1	1:47.96	Neck	Joel Rosario	
May 7, 2022	1 1/4 miles	Kentucky Derby	I	Churchill Downs	10.10	20	5	2:02.61	(3 3/4 lengths)	Irad Ortiz Jr	
Jun 11, 2022	1 1/2 miles	Belmont Stakes	I	Belmont Park	2.60*	8	1	2:28.28	3 lengths	Irad Ortiz Jr	

== Stud career ==
Mo Donegal's retirement was announced on 16 September 2022. Donegal Racing's Jerry Crawford indicated that the bone bruising following the Belmont Stakes would not allow Mo Donegal to make his target races for the remainder of the year, and that the best decision was to retire him. Mo Donegal will stand at Spendthrift Farm in Lexington, Kentucky for an initial stud fee of $20,000 in 2023.

== Pedigree ==
Pedigree of Mo Donegal, bay colt, foaled April 19, 2019
Sire Uncle Mo 2008	Indian Charlie; 1995	In Excess (IRE); 1987	Siberian Express 1981
Sire Uncle Mo 2008	Indian Charlie; 1995	In Excess (IRE); 1987	Kantado (IRE) 1976
Sire Uncle Mo 2008	Indian Charlie; 1995	Soviet Sojourn; 1989	Leo Castelli 1984
Sire Uncle Mo 2008	Indian Charlie; 1995	Soviet Sojourn; 1989	Political Parfait 1984
Sire Uncle Mo 2008	Playa Maya; 2000	Arch; 1995	Kris S. 1977
Sire Uncle Mo 2008	Playa Maya; 2000	Arch; 1995	Aurora 1988
Sire Uncle Mo 2008	Playa Maya; 2000	Dixie Slippers; 1995	Dixieland Band 1980
Sire Uncle Mo 2008	Playa Maya; 2000	Dixie Slippers; 1995	Cyane's Slippers 1983
Dam Callingmissbrown 2012	Pulpit; 1994	A.P. Indy; 1989	Seattle Slew 1974
Dam Callingmissbrown 2012	Pulpit; 1994	A.P. Indy; 1989	Weekend Surprise 1980
Dam Callingmissbrown 2012	Pulpit; 1994	Preach; 1989	Mr Prospector* 1970
Dam Callingmissbrown 2012	Pulpit; 1994	Preach; 1989	Narrate 1980
Dam Callingmissbrown 2012	Island Sand; 2001	Tabasco Cat; 1991	Storm Cat 1983
Dam Callingmissbrown 2012	Island Sand; 2001	Tabasco Cat; 1991	Barbicue Sauce 1983
Dam Callingmissbrown 2012	Island Sand; 2001	Sue's Last Dance; 1995	Forty Niner*^ 1985
Dam Callingmissbrown 2012	Island Sand; 2001	Sue's Last Dance; 1995	Savethelastdance 1988 (family 3-g)

*^ Mo Donegal is inbred 4D x 5D to the stallion Mr Prospector, meaning that he appears fourth and fifth generation (via Forty Niner)^ on the dam side of his pedigree.
