= Golden Pal =

American thoroughbred racehorse

- Sire: Uncle Mo
- Grandsire: Indian Charlie
- Dam: Lady Shipman
- Damsire: Midshipman
- Sex: Stallion
- Foaled: 23 February 2018 (age 7)
- Country: United States
- Colour: Bay
- Breeder: Randall E. Lowe
- Owner: 1. Ranlo Investments; 2. Derrick Smith, Mrs. John Magnier, Michael Tabor & Westerberg
- Trainer: Wesley Ward
- Record: 13: 8-2-0
- Earnings: USD$1,825,131

Major wins
- Skidmore Stakes (2020); Quick Call Stakes (2021); Woodford Stakes (2021, 2022); Shakertown Stakes (2022); Troy Stakes (2022); Breeders' Cup; Breeders' Cup Juvenile Turf Sprint (2020); Breeders' Cup Turf Sprint (2021)
- Last updated on 31 December 2022

Golden Pal (foaled 23 February 2018) is an American-bred and trained Thoroughbred racehorse. He is currently one of the best turf sprinters in the United States after winning two Breeders' Cup events, the Breeders' Cup Juvenile Turf Sprint in 2020 as a two-year-old and the Breeders' Cup Turf Sprint defeating older horses in 2021.

== Background ==
Golden Pal is a bay stallion who was bred in Florida by Randall E. Lowe. He raced as a two-year-old for Ranlo Investments as a homebred. He is sired by Uncle Mo, who was the US Champion Two-Year-Old Colt in 2010. Golden Pal's dam is Lady Shipman, a daughter of Midshipman, who won eleven black-type wins, including the Royal North Stakes. In 2015, she set track records at six furlongs at the Ocala Training Center in the OBS Sprint Stakes (1:08.80) and at 5 1/2 furlongs at Saratoga in the Smart N Fancy Stakes (1:00.46) and earned $902,387.

Golden Pal is trained by Wesley Ward, one of the leading turf sprint trainers in the US.

Wesley Ward bought Golden Pal as a yearling. The colt failed to meet his reserve when bidding stalled at $325,000 at the 2019 Keeneland September Yearling Sale.

After his two-year-old campaign Golden Pal was sold privately to the partnership by Westerberg, Derrick Smith, Mrs. John Magnier and Michael Tabor.

== Racing career ==
=== 2020: Two-year-old season ===
Golden Pal began breezing and preparing for his career at Turfway Park and to run at Keeneland, but the spring meeting at Keeneland was canceled due to COVID-19 pandemic in the United States. Trainer Wesley Ward then pointed to Gulfstream Park in Florida, where Golden Pal began his career on 17 April in a Maiden Special Weight event as the 1/2 odds-on favorite. Out of the starting gate, he was bumped but surged forward in the short 4 1/2 furlongs event on the dirt to lead, then got collared by Gatsby turning for home and yielded on the rail to finish second by 3/4 length.

Ward then planned for an early overseas trip for the two-year-old to Royal Ascot, where he has often been successful with early-running two-year-olds and turf sprinters. On 19 June, Golden Pal ran in the 5-furlong Group 2 Norfolk Stakes, facing eleven opponents. Starting at 12/1, he broke in front, leading down the center of the track but was collared in the final stride by The Lir Jet. After the event, Ward indicated that he was considering bringing Golden Pal back to England after a rest in the US in August for the Knavesmire speed test, well known as the Nunthorpe Stakes at York Racecourse.

However, Ward opted to stay in the US with Golden Pal, who initially was entered on 8 August in the Tyro Stakes at Monmouth Park Racetrack but was scratched since the race was taken off the turf. Two weeks later, on 21 August, Ward entered him in the Skidmore Stakes at Saratoga, a Black-type turf event for two-year-olds over 5 1/2 furlongs. Since Golden Pal was still a maiden, he received a four-pound allowance and broke fast, leading all the way as the 9/20 favorite to win by 3 1/2 lengths in a time of 1:00.88, which was about 3/5 second outside the track record.

After a 10-week break, in his last start of the year Ward entered Golden Pal in the Grade II Breeders' Cup Juvenile Turf Sprint at Keeneland. Golden Pal drew post position 14, but with the scratching of Ward's other entrant, Amanzi Yimpilo (IRE), Golden Pal started from post position 13 as the 4/5 favorite. He started quickly and was 2 1/2 lengths in front after 2 splits with jockey Irad Ortiz Jr. aboard. He entered the stretch run 4 lengths in front and held off the fast-finishing Cowan by 3/4 length. Owner Randell Lowe commented in the winner's circle, "Wesley Ward has believed in this horse from day one. I've been telling everyone about this horse. It has been a long haul, but we did it."

=== 2021: Three-year-old season ===
After the Breeders’ Cup, it was discovered that Golden Pal had a chip in a front ankle, and minor surgery was needed to removed it. After Golden Pal recovered and started to prepare for his sophomore campaign, it was announced in June that Randell Lowe had sold him to the Coolmore Stud partnership of Derrick Smith, Mrs. John Magnier, and Michael Tabor with Westerberg also having an interest in the horse.

Golden Pal remained with trainer Wesley Ward and had his first start of the year on opening day of the annual summer meeting at Saratoga in the Grade III Quick Call Stakes. He set splits of :21.92 and :44.88, winning by three lengths as the 1/5 favorite.

It was confirmed in August that Wesley Ward would set his sights for another trip to Britain for a crack at the Group 1 Nunthorpe Stakes. Golden Pal left Indianapolis on 12 August after a workout breeze a day before. On 20 August, Ghe ran in the Nunthorpe Stakes. After leading, he started to tire in the last 100 yards and was beaten by about 5 length into seventh place.

After returning to the US, Golden Pal was pointed to the Grade II Woodford Stakes at Keeneland. The event held on the second day of the fall meeting at the Keeneland track (9 October) attracted seven runners. Punters once again had overwhelmingly bet Golden Pal into a 1/2 favorite with US Hall of Fame jockey John Velazquez aboard. He won by 2 1/4 lengths in a time of 1:03.12.

On 6 November, Golden Pal returned to the Breeders' Cup and was entered in the Breeders' Cup Turf Sprint. As the lukewarm 5/2 favorite, he started fast under Irad Ortiz Jr. and led all the way to capture his first Grade I by 1 1/4 lengths in a time of 55.22, which was a 1/2 second outside the track record set by Fast Parade in 2006. Wesley Ward commented after the event, "He's got the title—he's the best horse (I've ever trained). I hope everyone in horse racing has a horse like this, as special as he is."

=== 2022: Four-year-old season ===
On 9 April, Golden Pal opened his four-year-old campaign with a 4 3/4-length win at Keeneland in the Grade II Shakertown Stakes, leading all the way in a time of 1:02.21.

Golden Pal started as the 15/8 favorite in a field of sixteen sprinters in the Group 1 King's Stand Stakes at Royal Ascot over the five-furlong straight course on opening day of the meeting and was slow to the gate. When the gates opened, he missed the start and although jockey Irad Ortiz Jr. rallied the horse, Golden Pal began to weaken about two furlongs from the finish and was eased down and finished last to Australian champion Nature Strip.

Golden Pal returned to the US, and after a break of six weeks his connections pointed him towards the GIII Troy Stakes at Saratoga. He rated outside leader True Valour and battled with him to the finishing post to win by a head in a time of 1:00.92. "I worked him twice and it was no problem in the morning," Ortiz said. "He relaxed well and finished good, so I wasn't afraid."

Golden Pal was pointed to the Grade II Woodford Stakes at Keeneland, an event he won in the previous year. He shot to the front under Irad Ortiz Jr. through fractions of :21.25 and :43.42 to score his eighth win from 12 starts by 1 1/2 lengths in a stakes-record time of 1:01.39 on firm turf.

== Statistics ==
Date	Distance	Race	Group Grade	Track	Odds	Field	Finish	Time	Margin	Jockey	Ref
2020 – Two-year-old season
17 Apr 2020	4 1/2 furlongs	Maiden		Gulfstream Park	0.50*	8	2	0:52.36	(3/4 length)	Tyler Gaffalione	
19 Jun 2020	5 furlongs	Norfolk Stakes	II	Royal Ascot	12.00	12	2	1:01.55	(neck)	Andrea Atzeni	
21 Aug 2020	5 1/2 furlongs	Skidmore Stakes		Saratoga	0.45*	6	1	1:00.88	3 1/2 lengths	Irad Ortiz Jr.	
6 Nov 2020	5 1/2 furlongs	Breeders' Cup Juvenile Turf Sprint	II	Keeneland	0.80*	14	1	1:02.82	3/4 length	Irad Ortiz Jr.	
2021 – Three-year-old season
15 Jul 2021	5 1/2 furlongs	Quick Call Stakes	III	Saratoga	0.20*	6	1	1:02.99	3 lengths	Irad Ortiz Jr.	
20 Aug 2021	5 furlongs	Nunthorpe Stakes	I	York	2.50	14	7	0:56.72	(5 lengths)	Lanfranco Dettori	
9 Oct 2021	5 1/2 furlongs	Woodford Stakes	II	Keeneland	0.50*	7	1	1:03.12	2 1/4 lengths	John R. Velazquez	
6 Nov 2021	5 furlongs	Breeders' Cup Turf Sprint	I	Del Mar	2.50*	12	1	0:55.22	1 1/4 lengths	Irad Ortiz Jr.	
2022 – Four-year-old season
9 Apr 2022	5 1/2 furlongs	Shakertown Stakes	II	Keeneland	0.60*	10	1	1:02.21	4 3/4 lengths	Irad Ortiz Jr.	
14 Jun 2022	5 furlongs	King's Stand Stakes	I	Royal Ascot	1.87*	16	16	0:58.25	(20 1/4 lengths)	Irad Ortiz Jr.	
5 Aug 2022	5 1/2 furlongs	Troy Stakes	III	Saratoga	0.30*	7	1	1:00.99	head	Irad Ortiz Jr.	
8 Oct 2022	5 1/2 furlongs	Woodford Stakes	II	Keeneland	0.37*	9	1	1:01.39 (Note: Golden Pal set a new stakes record time in the Woodford Stakes, eclipsing the old record by .05 seconds held by Stubbins and set in 2019)	1 1/2 lengths	Irad Ortiz Jr.	
6 Nov 2022	5 1/2 furlongs	Breeders' Cup Turf Sprint	I	Keeneland	1.32*	14	10	1:01.79	(5 1/4 lengths)	Irad Ortiz Jr.	

Legend:
Turf Dirt
Notes:
An (*) asterisk after the odds means Golden Pal was the post-time favourite.

== Pedigree ==
Pedigree of Golden Pal (US), bay colt, 2018
Sire Uncle Mo 2008	Indian Charlie; 1995	In Excess (IRE); 1987	Siberian Express 1981
Sire Uncle Mo 2008	Indian Charlie; 1995	In Excess (IRE); 1987	Kantado (IRE) 1978
Sire Uncle Mo 2008	Indian Charlie; 1995	Soviet Sojourn; 1989	Leo Castelli 1984
Sire Uncle Mo 2008	Indian Charlie; 1995	Soviet Sojourn; 1989	Political Parfait 1984
Sire Uncle Mo 2008	Playa Maya; 2000	Arch; 1995	Kris S. 1977
Sire Uncle Mo 2008	Playa Maya; 2000	Arch; 1995	Aurora 1988
Sire Uncle Mo 2008	Playa Maya; 2000	Dixie Slippers; 1995	Dixieland Band 1980
Sire Uncle Mo 2008	Playa Maya; 2000	Dixie Slippers; 1995	Cyann's Slippers 1983
Dam Lady Shipman 2012	Midshipman; 2006	Unbridled's Song; 1993	Unbridled 1987
Dam Lady Shipman 2012	Midshipman; 2006	Unbridled's Song; 1993	Trolley Song 1983
Dam Lady Shipman 2012	Midshipman; 2006	Fleet Lady; 1994	Avenue Of Flags 1988
Dam Lady Shipman 2012	Midshipman; 2006	Fleet Lady; 1994	Dear Mimi 1987
Dam Lady Shipman 2012	Sumthingtotalkabt; 2003	Mutakddim; 1991	Seeking The Gold 1985
Dam Lady Shipman 2012	Sumthingtotalkabt; 2003	Mutakddim; 1991	Oscillate 1986
Dam Lady Shipman 2012	Sumthingtotalkabt; 2003	Nanetta; 1989	Falstaff 1982
Dam Lady Shipman 2012	Sumthingtotalkabt; 2003	Nanetta; 1989	Twinkling 1981 (Family: 1-x)
