= Vequist =

American thoroughbred racehorse

- Sire: Nyquist
- Grandsire: Uncle Mo
- Dam: Vero Amore
- Damsire: Mineshaft
- Sex: Filly
- Foaled: 2018
- Country: United States
- Color: Dark Bay/Brown
- Breeder: Swilcan Stables
- Owner: Gary Barber, Wachtel Stable, Swilcan Stable LLC
- Trainer: Robert E. Reid Jr.
- Record: 5:2-2-0
- Earnings: $1,237,500

Major wins
- Spinaway Stakes (2020) Breeders' Cup wins: Breeders' Cup Juvenile Fillies (2020)

Awards
- American Champion Two-Year-Old Filly (2020)

Vequist (foaled February 6, 2018) is an American National Champion Thoroughbred racemare who won the 2020 Spinaway Stakes and Breeders' Cup Juvenile Fillies.

== Racing career ==
=== 2020: Two-year-old season ===
Vequist came second in her debut on July 29 at Parx Racetrack. She then won the Spinaway Stakes on September 6. She entered the race with 6:1 odds and won by 1 and 1/2 lengths over Esplanande.

On October 10, she came second in the Frizette Stakes. She came into the race as the favorite at 4:5 odds but lost to Dayoutoftheoffice by 2 lengths.

On November 6, Vequist won the Breeders' Cup Juvenile Fillies. She was the 4th favorite for the race and won by 2 lengths over Dayoutoftheoffice.

Vequist was named American Champion Two-Year-Old Filly for 2020.

=== 2021: Three-year-old season ===
Vequist made her first start of 2021 in the Davona Dale Stakes. She raced mid-pack, but jockey Irad Ortiz Jr. knew she didn't have the same kick that she had in the Juvenile Fillies and he eased her to a ninth place finish. An endoscopic examination after the race showed that Vequist had considerable congestion in her lungs.

The next goal was the Kentucky Oaks, but trainer Robert “Butch” Reid said that Vequist wasn't ready for that race and they would aim for the Alabama Stakes instead, with long term goals being the Cotillion Stakes and Breeders' Cup.

Vequist was retired her racing career while Spendthrift Farm purchased in Fasig-Tipton November Sale.

== Pedigree ==
Pedigree of Vequist (USA), 2018
Sire Nyquist (USA) b. 2013	Uncle Mo (USA) b. 2008	Indian Charlie	In Excess
Sire Nyquist (USA) b. 2013	Uncle Mo (USA) b. 2008	Indian Charlie	Soviet Sojourn
Sire Nyquist (USA) b. 2013	Uncle Mo (USA) b. 2008	Playa Maya	Arch
Sire Nyquist (USA) b. 2013	Uncle Mo (USA) b. 2008	Playa Maya	Dixie Slippers
Sire Nyquist (USA) b. 2013	Seeking Gabrielle (USA) b. 2007	Forestry	Storm Cat
Sire Nyquist (USA) b. 2013	Seeking Gabrielle (USA) b. 2007	Forestry	Shared Interest
Sire Nyquist (USA) b. 2013	Seeking Gabrielle (USA) b. 2007	Seeking Regina	Seeking The Gold
Sire Nyquist (USA) b. 2013	Seeking Gabrielle (USA) b. 2007	Seeking Regina	Fulbright Scholar
Dam Vero Amore (USA) b. 2011	Mineshaft (USA) b. 1999	A.P. Indy	Seattle Slew
Dam Vero Amore (USA) b. 2011	Mineshaft (USA) b. 1999	A.P. Indy	Weekend Surprise
Dam Vero Amore (USA) b. 2011	Mineshaft (USA) b. 1999	Prospectors Delite	Mr. Prospector
Dam Vero Amore (USA) b. 2011	Mineshaft (USA) b. 1999	Prospectors Delite	Up The Flagpole
Dam Vero Amore (USA) b. 2011	Summers Edge (USA) b. 2006	The Cliff's Edge	Gulch
Dam Vero Amore (USA) b. 2011	Summers Edge (USA) b. 2006	The Cliff's Edge	Zigember
Dam Vero Amore (USA) b. 2011	Summers Edge (USA) b. 2006	Miss Summer Reign	Summer Squall
Dam Vero Amore (USA) b. 2011	Summers Edge (USA) b. 2006	Miss Summer Reign	Sultry Lass
