= Dayoutoftheoffice =

American thoroughbred racehorse

- Sire: Into Mischief
- Grandsire: Harlan's Holiday
- Dam: Gottahaveadream
- Damsire: Indian Charlie
- Sex: Filly
- Foaled: February 19, 2018
- Country: USA
- Breeder: Siena Farms LLC
- Owner: Blazing Meadows Farm and Siena Farm LLC
- Trainer: Timothy E. Hamm
- Jockey: Junior Alvarado
- Record: 4:3-1-0
- Earnings: $556,500

Major wins
- Frizette Stakes (2020); Schuylerville Stakes (2020)

Dayoutoftheoffice (foaled February 19, 2018 ) is an American Thoroughbred racehorse and the winner of the 2020 Frizette Stakes.

== Career ==
Dayoutoftheoffice's first race was on May 14, 2020 at Gulfstream Park, where she came in first.

On July 16, 2020, she won the Grade-3 Schuylerville Stakes. She defeated Make Mischief by 6th lengths at 19:1 odds.

On October 10, 2020, she won her 3rd race in a row when she won the Grade-1 Frizette Stakes. She defeated the 4:5 favorite Vequist by 2 lengths at 2:1 odds.

On November 6, 2020, she competed in the Grade-1 Breeders' Cup Juvenile Fillies. While she had beaten Vequist in the prior race, Vequist defeated her by 2 lengths. This time, she was victorious over Dayoutoftheoffice by 2 lengths after coming in as the 4th ranked favorite for the race.

== Pedigree ==
Pedigree of Dayoutoftheoffice (USA), 2018
| Sire Into Mischief (USA) b. 2005 | Harlan's Holiday (USA) b. 1999 | Harlan | Storm Cat |
| Sire Into Mischief (USA) b. 2005 | Harlan's Holiday (USA) b. 1999 | Harlan | Country Romance |
| Sire Into Mischief (USA) b. 2005 | Harlan's Holiday (USA) b. 1999 | Christmas in Aiken | Affirmed |
| Sire Into Mischief (USA) b. 2005 | Harlan's Holiday (USA) b. 1999 | Christmas in Aiken | Dowager |
| Sire Into Mischief (USA) b. 2005 | Leslie's Lady (USA) b. 1996 | Tricky Creek | Clever Trick |
| Sire Into Mischief (USA) b. 2005 | Leslie's Lady (USA) b. 1996 | Tricky Creek | Battle Creek Girl |
| Sire Into Mischief (USA) b. 2005 | Leslie's Lady (USA) b. 1996 | Crystal Lady | Stop The Music |
| Sire Into Mischief (USA) b. 2005 | Leslie's Lady (USA) b. 1996 | Crystal Lady | One Last Bird |
| Dam Gottahaveadream (USA) b. 2008 | Indian Charlie (USA) b. 1995 | In Excess | Siberian Express |
| Dam Gottahaveadream (USA) b. 2008 | Indian Charlie (USA) b. 1995 | In Excess | Kantado |
| Dam Gottahaveadream (USA) b. 2008 | Indian Charlie (USA) b. 1995 | Soviet Sojourn | Leo Castelli |
| Dam Gottahaveadream (USA) b. 2008 | Indian Charlie (USA) b. 1995 | Soviet Sojourn | Political Parfait |
| Dam Gottahaveadream (USA) b. 2008 | Chasetheragingwind (USA) b. 1995 | Dayjur | Danzig |
| Dam Gottahaveadream (USA) b. 2008 | Chasetheragingwind (USA) b. 1995 | Dayjur | Gold Beauty |
| Dam Gottahaveadream (USA) b. 2008 | Chasetheragingwind (USA) b. 1995 | Race The Wild Wind | Sunny's Halo |
| Dam Gottahaveadream (USA) b. 2008 | Chasetheragingwind (USA) b. 1995 | Race The Wild Wind | Redpath |
