= A. P. Indian =

American thoroughbred racehorse

- Sire: Indian Charlie
- Grandsire: In Excess (IRE)
- Dam: Ender's Sister
- Damsire: A.P. Indy
- Sex: Gelding
- Foaled: May 6, 2010
- Country: USA
- Breeder: Green Lantern Stables LLC
- Owner: Green Lantern Stables LLC
- Trainer: Arnaud Delacour
- Record: 20:11-6-1

Major wins
- Decathlon Stakes (1915); Donald LeVine Memorial Stakes (2015, 2016); Belmont Sprint Championship Stakes (2016); Alfred G. Vanderbilt Handicap (2016); Forego Handicap (2016); Phoenix Stakes (2016)

A. P. Indian (foaled May 6, 2010 ) is an American Thoroughbred racehorse and the winner of the 2016 Belmont Sprint Championship Stakes.

== Career ==
Owned and bred by Richard & Sue Masson's Green Lantern Stables LLC, A. P. Indian's first race was on October 8, 2012, at Delaware Park Racetrack where he came in first. He also won his second race on September 6, 2013, this time at Churchill Downs.

A. P. Indian got his first stakes win at the May 9, 2015, Decathlon Stakes and won both the 2015 and 2016 editions of the Donald LeVine Memorial Stakes.

He got his first graded win on July 9, 2016, at the Belmont Sprint Championship Stakes.

He then won a series of graded races throughout 2016, with wins at the Alfred G. Vanderbilt Handicap, the Forego Handicap and the Phoenix Stakes, which was ultimately his final win.

He competed in the 2016 Breeders' Cup Sprint, coming in third and then finished his career with a second-place finish in the 2017 Maryland Sprint Handicap.

A. P. Indian was retired on July 31, 2017, after an ankle injury.

== Pedigree ==
Pedigree of A.P. Indian (USA), 2015
Sire Indian Charlie (USA) 1995	In Excess (IRE); 1987	Siberian Express	Caro
Sire Indian Charlie (USA) 1995	In Excess (IRE); 1987	Siberian Express	Indian Call
Sire Indian Charlie (USA) 1995	In Excess (IRE); 1987	Kantado	Saulingo
Sire Indian Charlie (USA) 1995	In Excess (IRE); 1987	Kantado	Vi
Sire Indian Charlie (USA) 1995	Soviet Sojourn (USA); 1989	Leo Castelli	Sovereign Dancer
Sire Indian Charlie (USA) 1995	Soviet Sojourn (USA); 1989	Leo Castelli	Suspicious Native
Sire Indian Charlie (USA) 1995	Soviet Sojourn (USA); 1989	Political Parfait	Diplomat Way
Sire Indian Charlie (USA) 1995	Soviet Sojourn (USA); 1989	Political Parfait	Peach Butter
Dam Ender's Sister (USA) 2001	A.P. Indy (USA); 1989	Seattle Slew	Bold Reasoning
Dam Ender's Sister (USA) 2001	A.P. Indy (USA); 1989	Seattle Slew	My Charmer
Dam Ender's Sister (USA) 2001	A.P. Indy (USA); 1989	Weekend Surprise	Secretariat
Dam Ender's Sister (USA) 2001	A.P. Indy (USA); 1989	Weekend Surprise	Lassie Dear
Dam Ender's Sister (USA) 2001	Gold Rush Queen (USA); 1994	Seeking the Gold	Mr. Prospector
Dam Ender's Sister (USA) 2001	Gold Rush Queen (USA); 1994	Seeking the Gold	Con Game
Dam Ender's Sister (USA) 2001	Gold Rush Queen (USA); 1994	Fit for a Queen	Fit to Fight
Dam Ender's Sister (USA) 2001	Gold Rush Queen (USA); 1994	Fit for a Queen	Titled
