= Uncle Mo =

American-bred Thoroughbred racehorse (2008–2024)

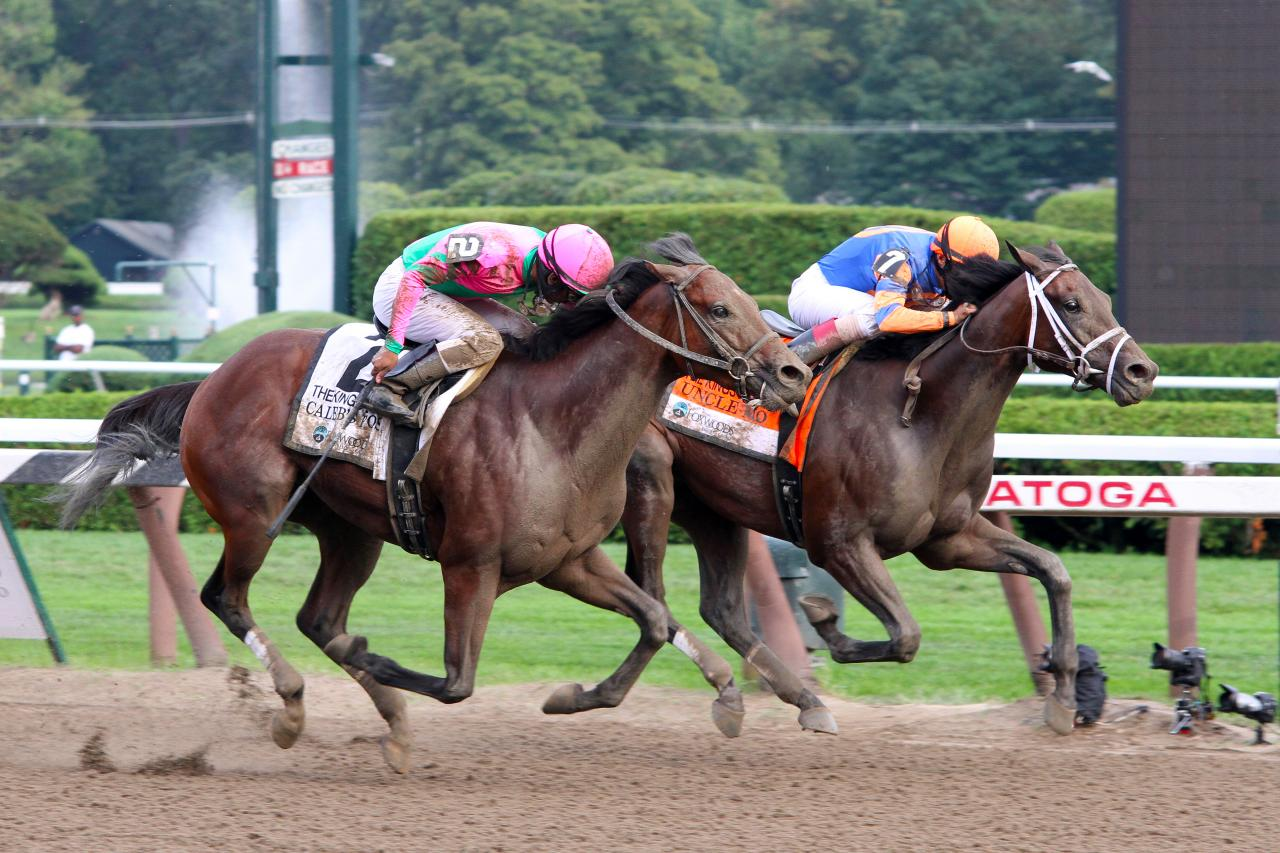
- Uncle Mo (right) battles Caleb's Posse in the 2011 King's Bishop Stakes
- Sire: Indian Charlie
- Grandsire: In Excess
- Dam: Playa Maya
- Damsire: Arch
- Sex: Stallion
- Foaled: March 10, 2008
- Died: December 19, 2024 (aged 16)
- Country: United States
- Colour: Bay
- Breeder: D. Michael Cavey
- Owner: Repole Stable
- Trainer: Todd A. Pletcher
- Record: 8: 5-1-1
- Earnings: US$1,336,000

Major wins
- Champagne Stakes (2010); Timely Writer Stakes (2011); Kelso Handicap (2011); Breeders' Cup wins: Breeders' Cup Juvenile (2010)

Awards
- American Champion Two-Year-Old Colt (2010)

Uncle Mo (March 10, 2008 – December 19, 2024) was an American champion Thoroughbred racehorse who went undefeated in his two-year-old season and was named the American Champion Two-Year-Old of 2010. However, his three-year-old season was disrupted by illness, causing him to miss the Kentucky Derby. Retired to stud in 2012, he was the leading freshman sire with his first foal crop, which included 2016 Kentucky Derby winner Nyquist.

== Racing career ==
=== 2010: two-year-old season ===
In his first start, a maiden special weight on the Travers undercard at Saratoga, Uncle Mo led at every call to beat a field of 2-year-olds by 14 1/4 lengths. In his next start, the Grade I Champagne Stakes, he took the lead early and never looked back en route to a 5-length win in the time of 1:34 2/5 seconds—faster than Secretariat's 1972 Champagne win.

In the Grade I Breeders' Cup Juvenile, Uncle Mo won by four lengths over Grade 1 winner Boys at Tosconova. He was voted the 2010 Eclipse Award as the American Champion Two-Year-Old Colt.

=== 2011: three-year-old season ===
As the early favorite for the 2011 Kentucky Derby, the first leg of the U.S. Triple Crown series, Uncle Mo made his 3-year-old debut in the Timely Writer, a one-turn mile overnight stakes at Gulfstream Park. After dawdling on the lead for the first three-quarters of a mile, he came home in 22 4/5 for the final quarter.

His next start was the Wood Memorial Stakes at Aqueduct on April 9. Running 9 furlongs for the first time in his career, Uncle Mo was defeated by Toby's Corner and finished third.

After his upset at 1-10 odds, he was diagnosed with a gastrointestinal infection but was still sent to Churchill Downs in anticipation of a start in the Kentucky Derby. After finishing a course of antibiotics, regressing immediately after stopping medication, and losing over 70 pounds in the weeks before the Derby, he was scratched the day before the race.

Sent to Winstar Farm to recuperate and receive attention from top veterinarians, Uncle Mo was diagnosed with cholangiohepatitis, a rare liver disease. He began treatment while continuing to rest at Winstar. After gaining back 110 pounds in two months, he returned to trainer Todd Pletcher's barn at Saratoga on July 11, 2011. The colt resumed training and finished second to Caleb's Posse in the 7-furlong King's Bishop Stakes on August 1, 2011. He then went on to win the Grade 2 Kelso Handicap at Belmont Park in wire to wire fashion.

== Retirement to stud ==
Uncle Mo was retired from racing on November 10, 2011, shortly after finishing 10th in the Breeders' Cup Classic. His retirement was prompted by elevated levels of the liver enzyme GGT, which also occurred earlier in the season and led to a diagnosis of cholangiohepatitis.

Uncle Mo began standing at Ashford Stud, the American arm of Irish breeding giant Coolmore, for the 2012 Thoroughbred breeding season, and later became a "shuttle stallion" servicing mares at Coolmore's American and Australian farms.

Uncle Mo at Ashford Stud

Uncle Mo was the leading freshman sire of 2015 in North America and the overall leading sire of two-year-olds in Europe and North America. In 2016, he was not only the leading second-crop sire, he also finished third in the general sire listing despite having only two crops of racing age. His stud fee was increased to $150,000 for the 2017 season.

On December 19, 2024, Mike Repole announced on his X account that Uncle Mo had been euthanized at the age of 16. He said that Uncle Mo had injured his left foreleg, and underwent surgery on the day before his death. "Uncle Mo was so much more to me than a champion and iconic stallion—he was and always will be part of my family," he said.

== Notable progeny ==
Uncle Mo has sired 16 individual Grade I winners.

c = colt, f = filly, g = gelding

Foaled	Name	Sex	Major Wins
2013	Gomo	f	Alcibiades Stakes
2013	Nyquist	c	Del Mar Futurity, FrontRunner Stakes, Breeders' Cup Juvenile, Florida Derby, Kentucky Derby
2013	Outwork	c	Wood Memorial Stakes
2013	Unbridled Mo	f	Apple Blossom Handicap
2014	Mo Town	c	Hollywood Derby
2015	Dream Tree	f	Starlet Stakes
2016	Mo Forza	c	Hollywood Derby
2017	Bast	f	Del Mar Debutante Stakes, Chandelier Stakes, Starlet Stakes
2017	Yaupon	c	Forego Stakes
2018	Golden Pal	c	Breeders' Cup Turf Sprint
2019	Mo Donegal	c	Belmont Stakes
2019	Adare Manor	f	Clement L. Hirsch Stakes (2023, 2024)
2019	A Mo Reay	f	Beholder Mile Stakes
2020	Arabian Knight	c	Pacific Classic Stakes
2020	Kingsbarns	c	Stephen Foster Stakes
2021	Seismic Beauty	f	Clement L. Hirsch Stakes

== Race record ==
Date	Track	Race	Distance	Finish
8/23/2010	Saratoga	Maiden	6 Furlongs	1
10/9/2010	Belmont Park	Champagne Stakes	8 Furlongs	1
11/6//2010	Churchill Downs	Breeders' Cup Juvenile	8 ½ Furlongs	1
3/12/2011	Gulfstream Park	Timely Writer Stakes	8 Furlongs	1
4/9/2011	Aqueduct	Wood Memorial	9 Furlongs	3
8/27/2011	Saratoga	King's Bishop Stakes	7 Furlongs	2
10/1/2011	Belmont Park	Kelso Handicap	8 Furlongs	1
11/5/2011	Churchill Downs	Breeders' Cup Classic	10 Furlongs	10

== Pedigree ==
Pedigree of Uncle Mo
Sire Indian Charlie	In Excess	Siberian Express	Caro
Sire Indian Charlie	In Excess	Siberian Express	Indian Call
Sire Indian Charlie	In Excess	Kantado	Saulingo
Sire Indian Charlie	In Excess	Kantado	Vi
Sire Indian Charlie	Soviet Sojourn	Leo Castelli	Sovereign Dancer*
Sire Indian Charlie	Soviet Sojourn	Leo Castelli	Suspicious Native
Sire Indian Charlie	Soviet Sojourn	Political Parfait	Diplomat Way
Sire Indian Charlie	Soviet Sojourn	Political Parfait	Peach Butter
Dam Playa Maya	Arch	Kris S.	Roberto
Dam Playa Maya	Arch	Kris S.	Sharp Queen
Dam Playa Maya	Arch	Aurora	Danzig*
Dam Playa Maya	Arch	Aurora	Althea
Dam Playa Maya	Dixie Slippers	Dixieland Band	Northern Dancer*
Dam Playa Maya	Dixie Slippers	Dixieland Band	Mississippi Mud
Dam Playa Maya	Dixie Slippers	Cyane's Slippers	Cyane
Dam Playa Maya	Dixie Slippers	Cyane's Slippers	Hot Slippers

* Uncle Mo is inbred 5S x 5D x 4D to the stallion Northern Dancer, meaning that he appears in the fifth generation (via Sovereign Dancer) on the sire side and in the fifth (via Danzig) and fourth generation on the dam side of his pedigree.

== Sources ==
- Uncle Mo's official website
- Uncle Mo's pedigree and racing stats
