= Kingsbarns (US bred horse) =

Winning racehorse

Kingsbarns (US)
- Sire: Uncle Mo
- Grandsire: Indian Charlie
- Dam: Lady Tapit
- Damsire: Tapit
- Sex: Colt
- Foaled: January 17, 2020
- Country: United States
- Color: Bay
- Breeder: Parks Investment Group
- Owner: Spendthrift Farm
- Trainer: Todd A. Pletcher
- Record: 9: 6 – 2 – 0
- Earnings: $1,559,060

Major wins
- Louisiana Derby (2023); Ben Ali Stakes (2024); Stephen Foster Stakes (2024)
- Last updated on July 3, 2024

Kingsbarns (foaled January 17, 2020) is a retired multiple-Graded winning American Thoroughbred racehorse that won the 2023 Louisiana Derby and in 2024 won the Grade I Stephen Foster Stakes at Churchill Downs.

== Background ==
Kingsbarns is a bay horse that was bred in Kentucky by Parks Investment Group headed by Lee Seering. Seering bought Kingsbarns' dam Lady Tapit for $675,000 who was offered at the 2013 Keeneland September Yearling Sale and raced her before her career came to an abrupt halt after a training accident. Kingsbarns was the second foal from Lady Tapit. His sire Uncle Mo since entering stud in 2012, stands for $150,000 at Ashford Stud in Versailles, Kentucky has been among the top sires in the Northern Hemisphere. As of April 2024 he ranks 20th overall in lifetime progeny earnings.

Kingsbarns sold for $250,000 at the 2021 Saratoga Select Yearling Sale to Tom McCrocklin as an agent for Champion Equine. He was then pinhooked and sold to Spendthrift Farm for $800,000 at the 2022 March Fasig-Tipton Two-Year-Olds in Training Sale.

Kingsbarns was trained by US Hall of Fame trainer Todd A. Pletcher.

Kingsbarns was retired in August 2024 after straining a leg ligament in training, and will stand the 2025 breeding season at Spendthrift.

== Statistics ==
Date	Distance	Race	Grade	Track	Odds	Field	Finish	Winning Time	Winning (Losing) Margin	Jockey	Ref
2023 – Three-year-old season
Jan 14, 2023	1 mile	Maiden Special Weight		Gulfstream Park	3.00*	11	1	1:39.18	1 3/4 lengths	Luis Saez	
Feb 12, 2023	1 mile & 40 yards	Allowance Optional Claiming		Tampa Bay Downs	0.50*	7	1	1:40.78	7 3/4 lengths	Antonio Gallardo	
Mar 25, 2023	1 3/16 miles	Louisiana Derby	II	Fair Grounds	4.50	12	1	1:57.33	3 1/2 lengths	Flavien Prat	
May 6, 2023	1 1/4 miles	Kentucky Derby	I	Churchill Downs	11.72	18	14	2:01.57	(25 1/4 lengths)	Jose L. Ortiz	
Jun 17, 2023	1 1/16 miles	Pegasus Stakes	Listed	Monmouth Park	0.50*	6	2	1:57.73	(neck)	Luis Saez	
2024 – Four-year-old season
Mar 2, 2024	7 furlongs	Allowance Optional Claiming		Gulfstream Park	0.60*	8	1	1:22.47	1/2 length	Luis Saez	
Apr 20, 2024	1 3/16 miles	Ben Ali Stakes	III	Keeneland	1.68*	9	1	1:57.74	3 1/4 lengths	Luis Saez	
May 17, 2024	1 3/16 miles	Pimlico Special	III	Pimlico	0.70*	7	2	1:57.73	(3/4 length)	Luis Saez	
Jun 29, 2024	1 1/8 miles	Stephen Foster Stakes	I	Churchill Downs	9.95	8	1	1:48.09	2 1/2 lengths	Luis Saez	

Notes:
An (*) asterisk after the odds means Kingsbarns was the post-time favorite.

== Pedigree ==
Pedigree of Kingsbarns, bay colt, foaled January 17, 2020
Sire Uncle Mo (2008)	Indian Charlie (1995)	In Excess (IRE) (1987)	Siberian Express (1981)
Sire Uncle Mo (2008)	Indian Charlie (1995)	In Excess (IRE) (1987)	Kantado (IRE) (1976 )
Sire Uncle Mo (2008)	Indian Charlie (1995)	Soviet Sojourn (1989)	Leo Castelli (1984)
Sire Uncle Mo (2008)	Indian Charlie (1995)	Soviet Sojourn (1989)	Political Parfait (1984)
Sire Uncle Mo (2008)	Playa Maya (2000)	Arch (1995)	Kris S. (1977)
Sire Uncle Mo (2008)	Playa Maya (2000)	Arch (1995)	Aurora (1988)
Sire Uncle Mo (2008)	Playa Maya (2000)	Dixie Slippers (1995)	Dixieland Band (1980)
Sire Uncle Mo (2008)	Playa Maya (2000)	Dixie Slippers (1995)	Cyane's Slippers (1983)
Dam Lady Tapit (2012)	Tapit (2001)	Pulpit (1994)	A.P. Indy (1989)
Dam Lady Tapit (2012)	Tapit (2001)	Pulpit (1994)	Preach (1989)
Dam Lady Tapit (2012)	Tapit (2001)	Tap Your Heels (1996)	Unbridled (1987)
Dam Lady Tapit (2012)	Tapit (2001)	Tap Your Heels (1996)	Ruby Slippers (1982)
Dam Lady Tapit (2012)	Temperence Gift (1998)	Kingmambo (1990)	Mr Prospector (1970)
Dam Lady Tapit (2012)	Temperence Gift (1998)	Kingmambo (1990)	Miesque (1984)
Dam Lady Tapit (2012)	Temperence Gift (1998)	Shapiro's Mistress (1986)	Unpredictable (1979)
Dam Lady Tapit (2012)	Temperence Gift (1998)	Shapiro's Mistress (1986)	Anytime Ms. (1979) (family 3)
