= Conveyance (horse) =

American-bred Thoroughbred racehorse

- Sire: Indian Charlie
- Grandsire: In Excess
- Dam: Emptythetill
- Damsire: Holy Bull
- Sex: Colt
- Foaled: 2007
- Died: 2023 (aged 15–16)
- Country: United States
- Colour: Gray
- Breeder: Gulf Coast Farms LLC
- Owner: Zabeel Racing International, LLC
- Trainer: Bob Baffert (2009 — 2010), Satish Seemar (2011)
- Record: 11: 4-3-1
- Earnings: US$450,830

Major wins
- San Rafael Stakes (2010); Southwest Stakes (2010)

Conveyance (February 28, 2007 in Kentucky – 2023) was an American Thoroughbred racehorse and sire. He was by leading stallion Indian Charlie and out of the broodmare Emptythetill, herself a daughter of American Horse of the Year Holy Bull. He was bred by Gulf Coast Farms LLC and Consigned by Taylor Made Sales Agency, agent, Conveyance was bought for $240,000 by Legends Racing.

== Racing career ==
Owned by Zabeel Racing International, LLC, he was trained by Bob Baffert in the United States and by Satish Seemar in the UAE. Unbeaten in his first four starts, he suffered his first defeat in the 2010 Sunland Derby and never won again in 6 subsequent starts.

Debuting as a two-year-old, Conveyance broke his maiden by 1 1/2 lengths at Santa Anita on Oct. 31 and followed that with a seven-length romp at Hollywood Park on Nov. 25.

He began his three-year-old season with a win in January's San Rafael Stakes at Santa Anita. He followed that win with a victory in the Southwest Stakes. After the race, Baffert made Conveyance his No. 3 Kentucky Derby prospect.

On March 28, Endorsement shocked Conveyance in the Sunland Derby, pulling ahead of him to win by three lengths.

Conveyance qualified for the Kentucky Derby, drawing post 12. He would go on to finish 15th in the field of 20.

Conveyance wouldn't race again until March 2011, now under UAE trainer Satish Seemar. In his first start back, he finished second in the Gr. III Mahab Al Shimaal. Following an eight in the Gr. II Godolphin Mile later that month, he wouldn't race again for another three years, and again faced defeat in his three subsequent starts. He was then returned to the US and retired to Buck Pond farm in Kentucky for the 2016 breeding season for a fee of $5,000 LFSN.

== Breeding career ==
Conveyance's first reported foal was a filly out of Get Real (Whywhywhy). He would sire his first winner on September 8, 2019. The colt, Bronn, was trained by Conveyance's first trainer, Bob Baffert.

Conveyance was moved to Blue Ribbon Farm in Washington for the 2021 breeding season, where he currently stands for $3,000 LFSN.

On September 23, 2023, his gelded son Nobody Listens gave Conveyance his first graded stakes winner by taking the Gr. III Turf Monster at Parx.
