= Kingsbarns (disambiguation) =

Kingsbarns is a village and parish in Scotland.

Kingsbarns may also refer to:

- Kingsbarns (Irish-bred horse), an Irish Thoroughbred racehorse who won the Racing Post Trophy in 2012
- Kingsbarns (US bred horse), an American Thoroughbred racehorse who won the Louisiana Derby in 2023
