= Petronel (horse) =

British-bred Thoroughbred racehorse

- Sire: Musket
- Grandsire: Toxophilite
- Dam: Crytheia
- Damsire: Hesperus
- Sex: Stallion
- Foaled: 1877
- Country: United Kingdom
- Colour: Black or Brown
- Breeder: Henry Somerset, 8th Duke of Beaufort
- Owner: 8th Duke of Beaufort
- Trainer: Joseph Cannon
- Record: 29: 12-1-8
- Earnings: £9,143

Major wins
- Troy Stakes (1879); 2000 Guineas (1880); Biennial Stakes (1880); Epsom Stakes (1881); Rous Memorial Stakes (1881); Stockbridge Queen's Plate (1881, 1882); Great Yorkshire Handicap (1881); Doncaster Cup (1881); Newmarket Queen's Plate (1881); Liverpool Queen's Plate (1881); Newcastle Queen's Plate (1882)

Petronel (1877 – 3 July 1897) was a British Thoroughbred racehorse and sire. After showing promise when winning the Troy Stakes as a juvenile in 1879, he recorded a major upset when defeating his more fancied opponents to take the 2000 Guineas in the following spring. He had never been entered in the other British Classic Races, but won at Royal Ascot and in several other top-class races that year. In 1881 he was one of the best staying horses in England, winning seven races including the Epsom Stakes, Rous Memorial Stakes, Great Yorkshire Handicap and Doncaster Cup as well as Queen's Plates at Stockbridge, Newmarket and Liverpool. He developed breathing problems and was never as good again, although he won Queen's Plates at Stockbridge and Newcastle in 1882. After his retirement from racing he had some success as a breeding stallion.

== Background ==
Petronel was a black or brown horse bred in England by his owner Henry Somerset, 8th Duke of Beaufort. He was sent into training with Joseph Cannon at Bedford Cottage in Newmarket, Suffolk. He could be difficult to handle and was described as "not a boy's horse to ride".

His sire Musket was a stayer whose most important success came in the Ascot Stakes. He had some success as a breeding stallion in England but had his biggest impact after being exported to Australasia in 1878. Petronel's dam Crytheia was a half-sister of the 2000 Guineas winner Vauban. Crytheia and her female-line ancestors have been traditionally placed in Thoroughbred Family 2 but recent research suggest that they may have belonged Family 28.

== Racing career ==
=== 1879: two-year-old season ===
Petronel began his racing career in the Middle Park Stakes, then the most prestigious race for two-year-old, over six furlongs at Newmarket Racecourse in October, and finished unplaced behind the favourite Beaudesert. On his only subsequent start of 1879 he contested the £425 Troy Stakes at the same track and won easily from the filly Strathardle. A correspondent for Bell's Life wrote "Petronel a tough sort of colt and he should train on, as he possesses plenty of size, good limbs and will probably prove as good a stayer as his sire."

=== 1880: three-year-old season ===
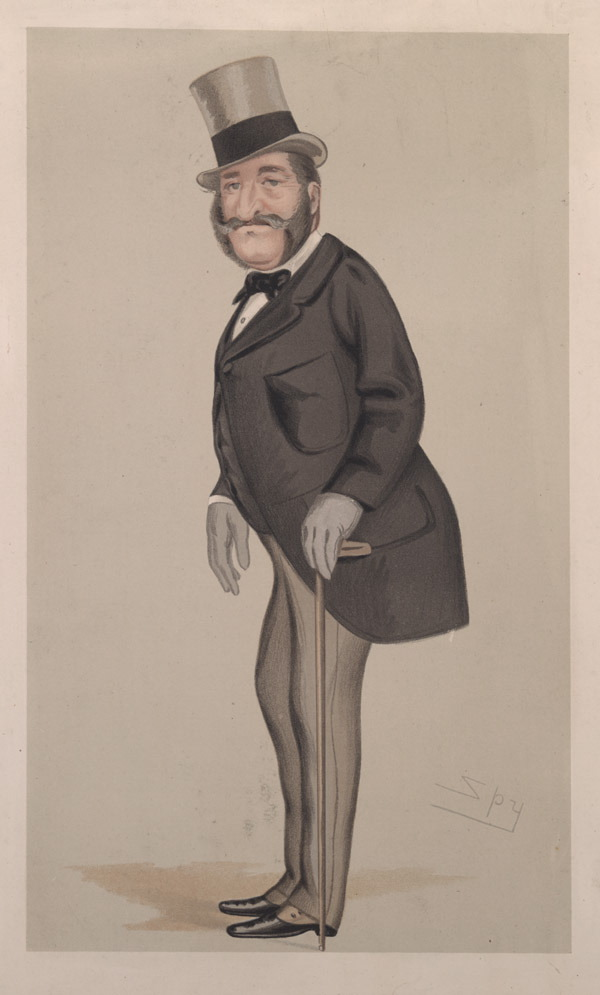
Petronel's owner, the Duke of Beaufort, in an 1876 caricature from Vanity Fair

On 28 April Petronel, ridden by George Fordham, was one of seventeen colts to contest the 72nd running of the 2000 Guineas over the Rowley Mile at Newmarket and started at odds 20/1. Despite his relatively modest form, and conflicting reports about his performances in training, he had been backed by some professional gamblers of the strength of inside information. Brotherhood started the 9/4 favourite, ahead of the Duke of Westminster's Muncaster on 9/2, with Beauminet, The Abbot and Zealot on 10/1. Petronel was not among the early leaders as Beauminet set the pace, but moved into contention as the runners entered the last quarter mile. Entering the final furlong, Beauminet weakened abruptly, leaving Muncaster in front from Petronel and the rapidly closing The Abbot. In a "close and exciting struggle" Petronel overhauled Muncaster in the final strides to win by a head, with The Abbot three quarters of a length back in third. The Duke of Beaufort initially thought that his colt had narrowly failed to catch Muncaster, saying "ten yards farther and I should have won", before the official result was posted.

Petronel had no chance to challenge for the Triple Crown as he had not been entered for either the Derby Stakes or the St Leger. He returned to the track on the opening day of the Royal Ascot in June where he finished third to Zealot and The Abbot in the Prince of Wales's Stakes conceding fifteen pounds to the winner. On the following afternoon he won the £880 Biennial Stakes "in a canter" from Bladud, Brotherhood and Pride of the Ocean. He turned out again on the third day of the meeting and came home third behind the filly Cipolata and the four-year-old Discord in the New Biennial Stakes.

In October Petronel was assigned a weight of 103 pounds for the Cesarewitch Handicap over two and a quarter miles at Newmarket and started the 5/1 favourite. He came home seventh of the 18 runners in a race won by Robert the Devil from Cipolata and The Star. In the Cambridgeshire Handicap two weeks later at the same track the colt started a 50/1 outsider under a weight of 112 pounds and finished unplaced behind the four-year-old filly Lucetta. On his final appearance of the season, Petronel ran a close third to Prestonpans and Philammon in the Autumn Cup at Liverpool Racecourse on 10 November.

Petronel ended the year with winnings of £5,641 making him the fifth most financially successful horse of the year behind Robert the Devil, Bal Gal, Bend Or and Thebais.

=== 1881: four-year-old season ===
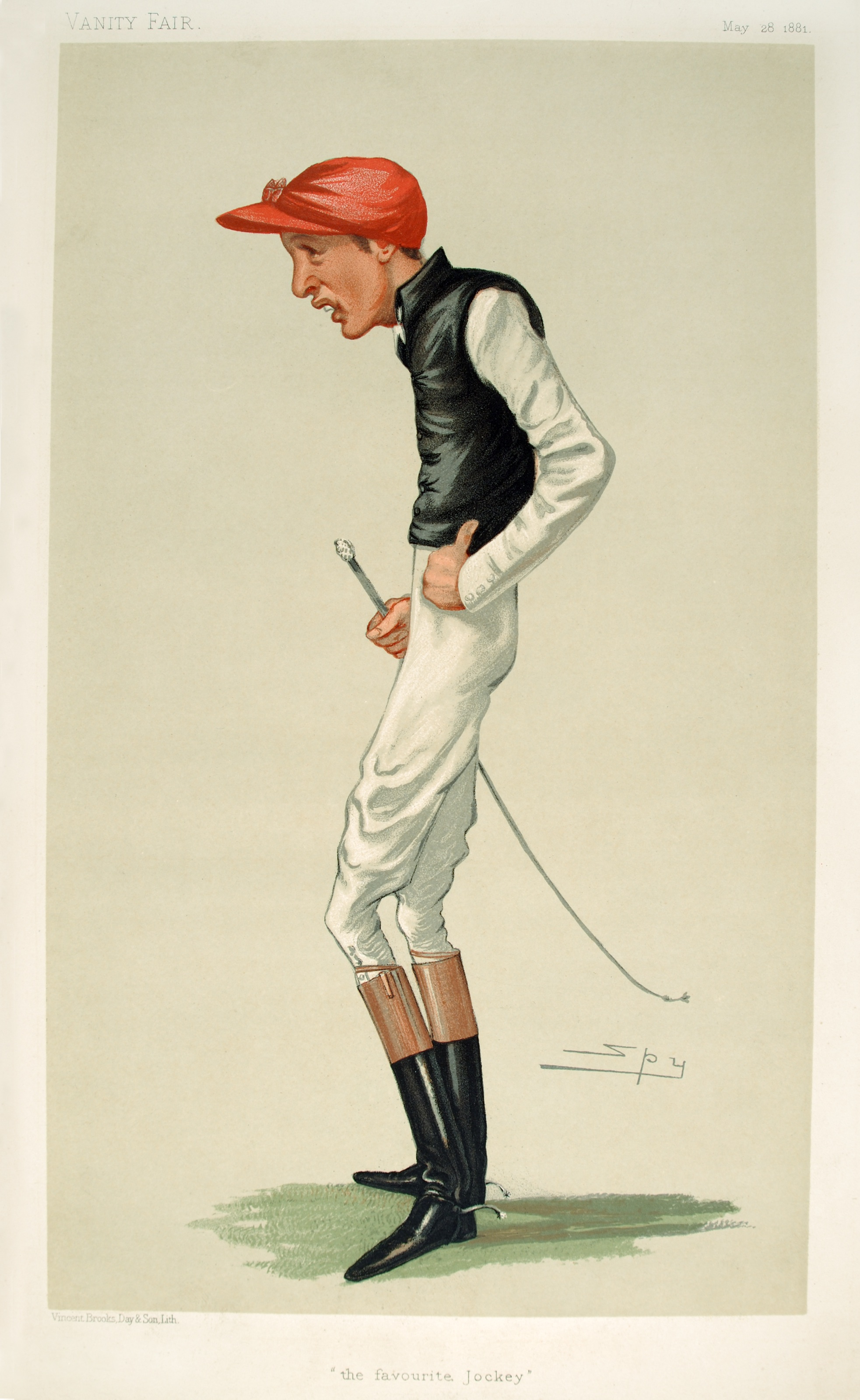
Fred Archer, Petronel's regular jockey in 1881 caricature from Vanity Fair

Petronel began his third campaign by finishing fourth behind Bend Or, Foxhall and Post Obit in the City and Suburban Handicap at Epsom Racecourse on 27 April. On 31 May Petronel was assigned top weight of 124 pounds for the £500 for the one and a half mile Epsom Stakes Handicap at the same track and started the 13/8 favourite. Ridden by Fred Archer he took the lead approaching the final furlong and won "comfortably" by three quarters of a length from Lord Bradford's Retreat. At the Ascot meeting in June he ran three times, as he had done in 1880. In the Royal Hunt Cup he finished third behind Peter and Sword Dance before turning out for the two and a half mile Gold Cup on the following day. He never looked likely to win but stayed on strongly in the straight to take second place behind Robert the Devil. On the next afternoon he carried 130 pounds in the £1000 Rous Memorial Plate and won from Ishmael and Toastmaster. On 30 June, with Archer in the saddle, he added a win in the Queen's Plate (worth £200) at Stockbridge Racecourse, beating the favourite Exeter by a neck. The death of the Duke of Beaufort's son Fitzroy Somerset, led to Petronel being withdrawn from his engagements at the Goodwood meeting.

On 14 September Petronel carried top weight of 124 pounds in the £300 Great Yorkshire Handicap at Doncaster Racecourse and started the 2/1 favourite against thirteen opponents. Ridden by Archer, he took the lead in the straight and won a "good race" by a neck from Teviotdale with Syracuse three lengths back in third. At the same meeting he started the 4/11 favourite for the Doncaster Cup and won from Tristan. In October Petronel ran for the second time in the Cesarewitch, but carrying top weight of 132 pounds he finished unplaced behind Foxhall. At the same Newmarket meeting however he won the £300 Queen's Plate over two miles, beating Lord Bradford's Chippendale by three quarters of a length at level weight with the pair finishing well clear of the other two runners. At the next Newmarket meeting he ran unplaced behind Foxhall in the Cambridgeshire. In the £200 Queen's Plate over two miles at Liverpool on 11 November he started the 4/7 favourite, led from the start and won by two lengths from Victor Emmanuel. He ended his season at Manchester Racecourse with a "great game" performance to finish third in the November Handicap when conceding more than 50 pounds to the winner Gladstone.

Petronel's seven victories as a four year old earned his owner a total of £2,677.

=== 1882: five-year-old season ===
In June 1882 Petronel made his second attempt to win the Ascot Gold Cup. He raced in second place for most of the way but was unable to make any progress in the straight and came home last of the three runners behind Foxhall and Faugh-A-Ballagh. On the following afternoon he stated a 100/1 outsider for the three-mile Alexandra Plate and ran third behind Fiddler and Foxhall. He barely completed the course, finishing "very distressed" in a "slow canter". Despite his poor performances at Ascot he returned to winning form three weeks later when he took the £200 Queen's Plate at Newcastle Racecourse. By this time he had developed respiratory problems, being described as a "roarer" but he was able to win the Queen's Plate at Stockbridge for the second time. At Brighton Racecourse on 1 August he finished third to Fenelon and Isabel in the Brighton Cup over two miles, conceding 42 pounds and 25 pounds to the winner and runner-up respectively.

At some point before the autumn of 1882, Petronel appears to have enabled the Duke of Beaufort to gain possession of "The Whip", an unusual challenge trophy said to be fashioned from the tail-hairs of Eclipse and open only to horses owned by members of the Jockey Club. It is unclear if Petronel won the trophy in a match race or by forfeit.

=== 1883: six-year-old season ===
At Manchester on 16 May 1883, Petronel ran unplaced as a 20/1 outsider in the Manchester Cup over one and three quarter miles. On 22 October he finished unplaced behind Bendigo in the Cambridgeshire.

== Stud record ==
At the end of his racing career Petronel was retired to become a breeding stallion at the Duke of Beaufort's stud at Badminton House. The most successful of his offspring were Ragimunde (won Cesarewitch and Great Metropolitan Handicap) and Son of a Gun (won Newmarket Derby, second in Sussex Stakes and Chester Cup). He also sired two important broodmares: Miss Gunning (IRE) whose descendants have included American Flag, Nashua, King of Kings and Dance Partner; and Parting Shot, a half-bred mare whose descendants have included Quashed, Sonic Lady, Attraction and Jet Setting. Petronel died on 3 July 1897 at Badminton House.

== Pedigree ==
Pedigree of Petronel (GB), black or brown stallion, 1878
Sire Musket (GB) 1867	Toxophilite; 1855	Longbow	Ithuriel
Sire Musket (GB) 1867	Toxophilite; 1855	Longbow	Miss Bowe
Sire Musket (GB) 1867	Toxophilite; 1855	Legerdemain	Pantaloon
Sire Musket (GB) 1867	Toxophilite; 1855	Legerdemain	Decoy
Sire Musket (GB) 1867	West Australian mare 1857	West Australian	Melbourne
Sire Musket (GB) 1867	West Australian mare 1857	West Australian	Mowerina
Sire Musket (GB) 1867	West Australian mare 1857	Brown Bess	Camel
Sire Musket (GB) 1867	West Australian mare 1857	Brown Bess	Brutandorf mare
Dam Crytheia (GB) 1861	Hesperus; 1849	Bay Middleton	Sultan*
Dam Crytheia (GB) 1861	Hesperus; 1849	Bay Middleton	Cobweb
Dam Crytheia (GB) 1861	Hesperus; 1849	Plenary	Emilius
Dam Crytheia (GB) 1861	Hesperus; 1849	Plenary	Harriet
Dam Crytheia (GB) 1861	Palm; 1854	Tadmor	Ion
Dam Crytheia (GB) 1861	Palm; 1854	Tadmor	Palmyra*
Dam Crytheia (GB) 1861	Palm; 1854	Figtree	Envoy
Dam Crytheia (GB) 1861	Palm; 1854	Figtree	Azora (Family 2 or 28)

* Petronel is inbred 4D x 5D to the stallion Sultan, meaning that he appears fourth generation and fifth generation (via Palmyra) on the dam side of his pedigree.
