= Quick Call Stakes =

- Class: Grade III
- Location: Saratoga Race Course; Saratoga Springs, New York, United States
- Inaugurated: 2008
- Race type: Thoroughbred – Flat racing
- Sponsor: Thoroughbred Retirement Foundation (since 2022)
- Website: NYRA

Race information
- Distance: 5 1/2 furlongs
- Surface: Turf
- Track: Left-handed
- Qualification: Three years old
- Weight: 124 lbs with allowances
- Purse: US$175,000 (2022)

The Quick Call Stakes is a Grade III American Thoroughbred horse race for horses aged three years old over the distance of 5 1/2 furlongs on the turf scheduled annually in July at Saratoga Race Course in Saratoga Springs, New York. The event currently carries a purse of $175,000.

== History ==
The race was inaugurated in September 2008. Thereafter it has been held in either July or early August.

The event is named in honor of Quick Call, the multiple graded stakes winning gelding who won more than half his 16 career victories at the Saratoga Race Course. Quick Call was a dual winner of the GII Forego Handicap, lived to the age of 35 and is buried at Clare Court in Saratoga Springs.

The 2010 running was on the Inner Turf course at a distance of 1 mile.

In 2019 the event was upgraded to Grade III. The race was run on the main track in 2023 and was subsequently downgraded to a Listed event.

== Records ==
Speed record:

- 5 1/2 furlongs; 1:00.80 – Big Invasion (2022)

Margins:

- 5 1/2 lengths; Uncashed (2023 - dirt)
- 3 3/4 lengths; Central Banker (2013 - turf)

Most wins by a jockey:

- 4 – Irad Ortiz Jr.: (2018, 2021, 2023, 2025)

Most wins by a trainer:

- 2 – Linda L. Rice: (2009, 2020)
- 2 – Christophe Clement: (2014, 2022)

Most wins by an owner:

- 2 – Michael Dubb: (2008, 2018)

== Winners ==
Year	Winner	Jockey	Trainer	Owner	Distance	Time	Purse	Grade	Ref
2026	Learntodiscover (GB)	Tyler Gaffalione	Brendan P. Walsh	Mark Dobbin	5 1/2 furlongs	1:02.69	$225,000	III	
2025	Governor Sam	Irad Ortiz Jr.	George Weaver	Bergman Family Stable & Swinbank Stable	5 1/2 furlongs	1:02.68	$175,000	III	
2024	ƒ Star of Mystery (GB)	Flavien Prat	Charlie Appleby	Godolphin Racing	5 1/2 furlongs	1:00.97	$175,000	III	
2023	Uncashed	Irad Ortiz Jr.	Larry Rivelli	Patricia's Hope	5 1/2 furlongs	1:03.44	$175,000	Listed	
2022	Big Invasion	Joel Rosario	Christophe Clement	Reeves Thoroughbred Racing	5 1/2 furlongs	1:00.80	$175,000	III	
2021	Golden Pal	Irad Ortiz Jr.	Wesley A. Ward	Derrick Smith, Mrs. John Magnier & Michael Tabor & Westerburg	5 1/2 furlongs	1:02.99	$120,000	III	
2020	Turned Aside	Jose Lezcano	Linda L. Rice	Paul P. Pompa Jr.	5 1/2 furlongs	1:01.99	$100,000	III	
2019	Listing	Joel Rosario	Ben D. A. Cecil	Reddam Racing	5 1/2 furlongs	1:03.94	$100,000	III	
2018	World of Trouble	Irad Ortiz Jr.	Jason Servis	Michael Dubb, Madaket Stables, Bethlehem Stable	5 1/2 furlongs	1:04.11	$100,000	Listed	
2017	Blind Ambition	Javier Castellano	Todd A. Pletcher	Gainesway Farm	5 1/2 furlongs	1:01.51	$100,000	Listed	
2016	Holding Gold	Julien R. Leparoux	Mark E. Casse	Live Oak Plantation	5 1/2 furlongs	1:10.84	$100,000	Listed	
2015	Ready for Rye	Javier Castellano	Thomas Albertrani	Chalk Racing	5 1/2 furlongs	1:01.47	$100,000	Listed	
2014	Pure Sensation	Jose Lezcano	Christophe Clement	Patricia A. Generazio	5 1/2 furlongs	1:01.82	$100,000	Listed	
2013	Central Banker	Joel Rosario	Albert Stall Jr.	Klaravich Stables & William Lawrence	5 1/2 furlongs	1:02.56	$100,000	Listed	
2012	Artest	John R. Velazquez	Michelle Nihei	Dennis Narlinger	5 1/2 furlongs	1:02.12	$100,000	Listed	
2011	Great Mills	Julien R. Leparoux	Steven M. Asmussen	Millennium Farms	5 1/2 furlongs	1:01.31	$78,000	Listed	
2010	Beau Choix	Javier Castellano	Barclay Tagg	Belle Meadows Farm and Lael Stable	1 mile	1:35.57	$70,000		
2009	Awakino Cat	Alan Garcia	Linda L. Rice	Linda L. Rice & F E Que Stable	5 1/2 furlongs	1:01.87	$73,200		
2008	Salute the Count	Eibar Coa	Richard E. Dutrow Jr.	Michael Dubb & Robert Joscelyn	5 1/2 furlongs	1:01.24	$84,000	Listed	

Notes:
ƒ Filly or Mare
Legend:
Turf Inner turf Main Track (Off the Turf)

== See also ==
List of American and Canadian Graded races
