= Bodyarmor SuperDrink =

American brand of sports drink

- Industry: Beverage manufacturing
- Founded: 2011; 15 years ago
- Founders: Lance Collins and Mike Repole
- Headquarters: Queens, New York City, U.S.
- Key people: Nick Mouton, CEO; Mike Repole, Chairman; Vanessa Bryant, Board of Directors; Klay Thompson, Investor; Rob Gronkowski, Investor; Baker Mayfield, Investor; Buster Posey, Investor; Mike Trout, Investor; Richard Sherman, Investor; Skylar Diggins, Investor; Sydney Leroux, Investor; Dustin Johnson, Investor; Ryan Blaney, Investor; Anthony Rizzo, Spokesperson
- Parent: The Coca-Cola Company
- Website: drinkbodyarmor.com

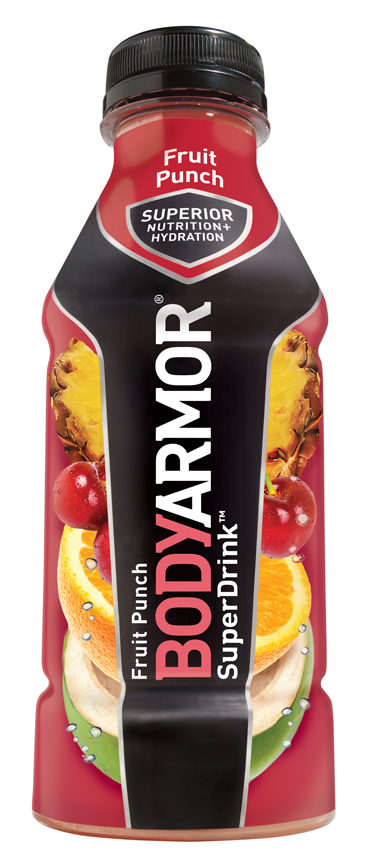
Bodyarmor SuperDrink (Fruit Punch)

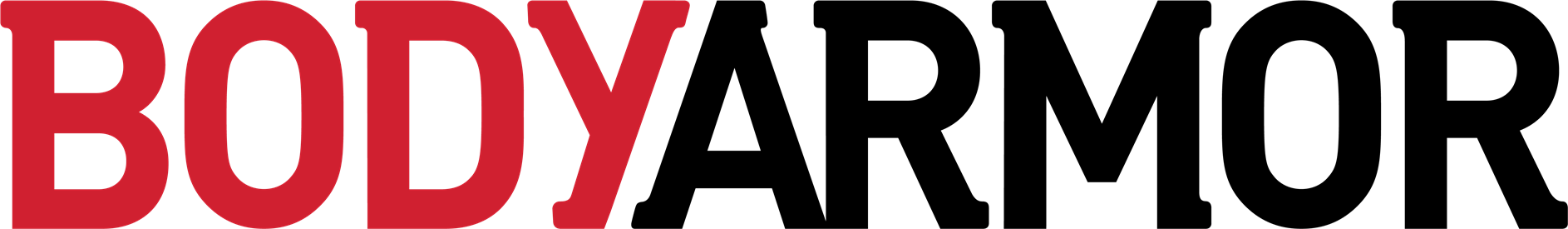
Bodyarmor logo from 2011 to 2025

Bodyarmor SuperDrink (stylized as BODYARMOR) is an American brand of sports drink owned by The Coca-Cola Company. Products launched under the brand include: Sports, "Lyte" Sports, "Edge Sports," and "SportWater".

Mike Repole created the drink in 2011. In the summer of 2018, The Coca-Cola Company purchased a minority stake in the company to position Bodyarmor as a premium sports beverage above its own Powerade brand. The purchase by Coca-Cola made them the second largest shareholder. In November 2021, Coca-Cola acquired the remaining 85% stake of the company.

== Flavors and variations ==
Bodyarmor variations are listed below:

=== Sports Drink ===
- Blackout Berry
- Blue Raspberry
- Cherry Lime
- Fruit Punch
- Orange Mango
- Pineapple Coconut
- Strawberry Banana
- Strawberry Grape
- Tropical Passionfruit
- Tropical Punch

=== Zero Sugar ===
- Cherry Berry Lemonade
- Cherry Lime
- Fruit Punch
- Lemon Lime
- Orange
- Watermelon Strawberry

=== Lyte ===
- Blueberry Pomegranate
- Dragonfruit Berry
- Peach Mango
- Strawberry Banana
- Tropical Coconut

=== Flash I.V. ===
- Cucumber Lime
- Grape
- Lemon Lime Zero
- Orange
- Pineapple Passionfruit
- Strawberry Kiwi
- Tropical Punch
- Watermelon Punch

=== Flash I.V. Sticks Hydration Booster ===
- Cucumber Lime
- Grape
- Lemon Lime
- Strawberry Kiwi
- Tropical Punch

=== Flash I.V. Sticks Hydration Booster + Caffeine ===
- Blue Raspberry
- Dragonfruit Berry

=== Fit ===
- Citrus Grapefruit
- Mixed Berry
- Orange Mango
- Tropical Passionfruit
- Watermelon Lime

=== SportWater ===
- Alkaline Water With Electrolytes

=== Discontinued ===
- Berry Lemonade
- Cherry Citrus
- Gold Berry
- Grape
- Kiwi Apple
- Knockout Punch
- Lemon Lime
- Lemonade
- Mixed Berry
- Octagon Orange
- Pomegranate Acai Green Tea
- Raspberry Blueberry Goji
- Tropical Mandarin
- Watermelon Strawberry
- Berry Punch Lyte
- Cherry Berry Lyte
- Coconut Lyte
- Kiwi Strawberry Lyte
- Orange Citrus Lyte
- Orange Clementine Lyte
- Strawberry Lemonade Lyte
- Watermelon Lyte
- Berry Blitz Edge
- Blue Raspberry Edge
- Grape Edge
- Orange Frenzy Edge
- Power Punch Edge
- Strawberry Edge
- Strawberry Slam Edge
- Tropical Chaos Edge
- Tropical Punch Edge
- Watermelon Wave Edge
- Fruit Punch Flash I.V.

== Product ingredients ==
General ingredients for the beverage include: Filtered Water, Pure Cane Sugar, Coconut Water Concentrate, Citric Acid, Dipotassium Phosphate (Electrolyte), Vegetable Juice Concentrate (Color), Ascorbic Acid (Vitamin C), Magnesium Oxide (Electrolyte), Niacinamide (Vitamin B3), Calcium D-Pantothenate (Vitamin B5), alpha-Tocopheryl Acetate (Vitamin E), Zinc Oxide (Electrolyte), Pyridoxine Hydrochloride (Vitamin B6), Folic Acid (Vitamin B9), Vitamin A Palmitate (Vitamin A), Cyanocobalamin (Vitamin B12), and natural flavors.

== Partnerships ==
Bodyarmor has partnered with Joe Burrow, Naomi Osaka, Baker Mayfield, Andrew Luck, Mike Trout, Rob Gronkowski, Klay Thompson, Skylar Diggins, and Sydney Leroux.

In April 2015, Bodyarmor became the official sports drink of the Los Angeles Angels of Anaheim.

As part of their endorsement deal with NASCAR Cup Series driver Ryan Blaney, Bodyarmor is a sponsor of Blaney's #12 car for Team Penske.

In 2018, Bodyarmor became the official sports drink brand of the Ultimate Fighting Championship, commensurate with the introduction of the "Knockout Punch" flavor.

Later in 2018 with Coca-Cola's minority stake taken in the company, Bodyarmor became the official sports drink brand for the NCAA's national championship tournaments, including the men's and women's basketball tournaments starting in 2019.

In 2019, Bodyarmor became the official sports drink of Major League Soccer beginning with the 2020 MLS season.

In 2024, Bodyarmor became the official sports drink of the NHL.

In 2026, as part of Bodyarmor founder and chairman Mike Repole's investment into the United Football League, Bodyarmor became an official sponsor of that league.

== Legal issues ==
In 2012, Baltimore's Under Armour Inc. settled its trademark infringement lawsuit against California-based Body Armor Nutrition LLC. The suit claimed that Bodyarmor used variations of Under Armour's name and logo to sell its sports beverage products. Terms of the settlement have not been disclosed. The lawsuit had alleged that Body Armor's name, the "interlocking" logo on its sports drink bottles and use of the phrase "Protect + Restore," infringe on Under Armour's trademarks.
