= William E. Applegate =

American bookmaker, breeder, racer, and track owner (1851–1928)

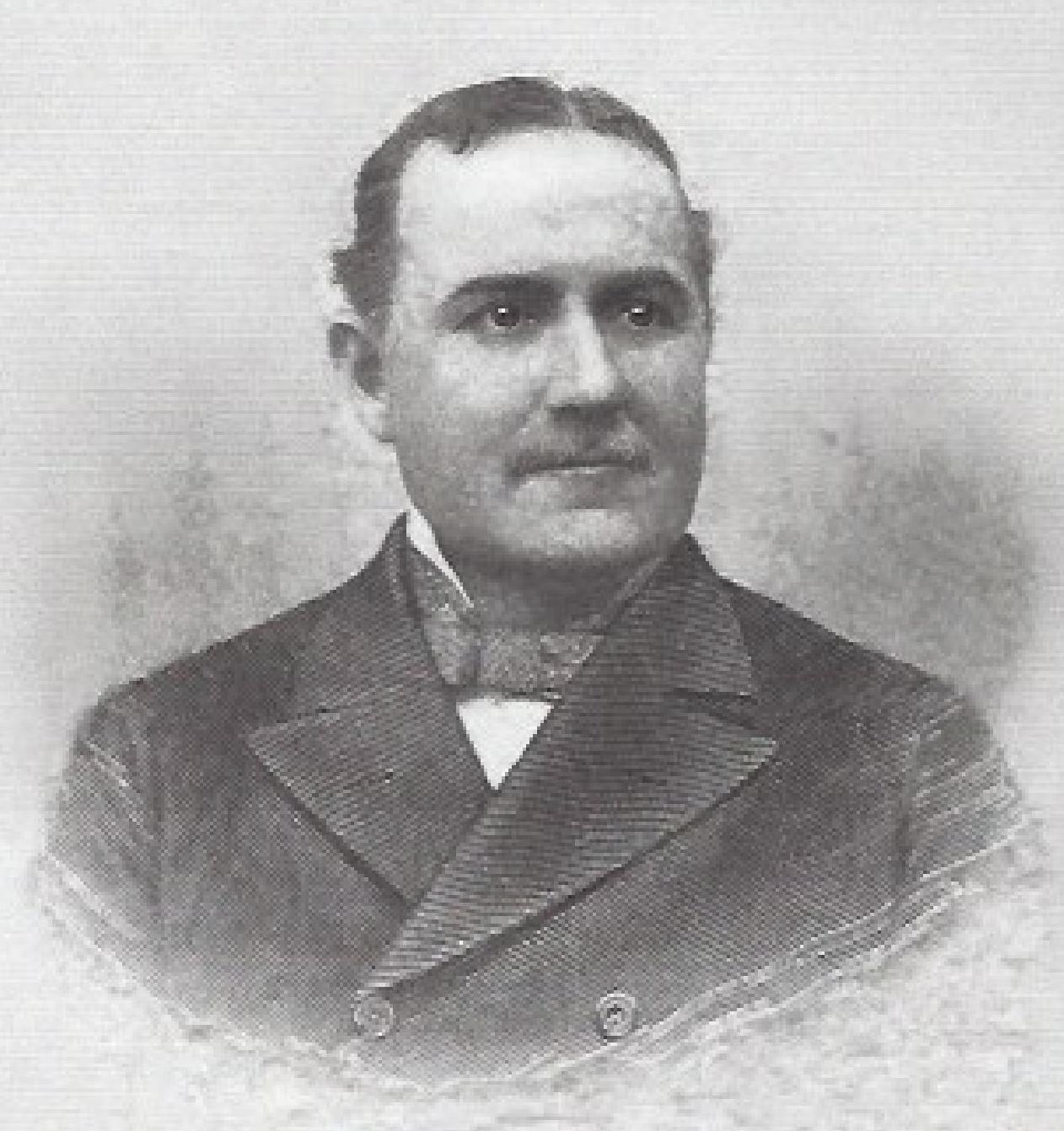
- Applegate in an 1896 publication
- Born: December 18, 1851; Georgetown, Kentucky, U.S.
- Died: May 13, 1928 (aged 76)
- Occupations: Bookmaker; breeder; racer; businessman

Signature
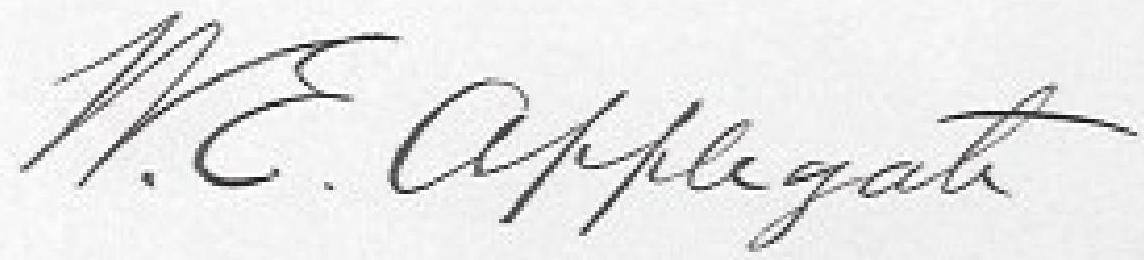

William E. Applegate (December 18, 1851 – May 13, 1928) was an American turfman, involved in the horse racing industry for over fifty years. He was known as a bookmaker, breeder, racer and track owner. At one time, Applegate was owner of Churchill Downs, Latonia and one of the builders of Oakley Racetrack in Cincinnati, Ohio.

== Life ==
A native of Georgetown, Kentucky, he came to Louisville as a young man and began his career in his family's wholesale whiskey house, Applegate & Sons. In 1894, Applegate led a syndicate that purchased Churchill Downs and implemented changes that remain today. The New Louisville Jockey Club was formed and an estimated $100,000 was invested to reconfigure the track and create a new grandstand with the iconic twin spires, designed by Joseph Dominic Baldez (1870–1957). Today, much of the 1895 grandstand's interior still exists, including the brick-floored "bullring" where trainers congregate. The 1896 Kentucky Derby held historic significance. The race distance was reduced from a mile and a half to the present mile and a quarter, a larger purse was implemented and, for the first time, a "collar" of roses was presented to the winner.

In 1902, W. E. Applegate continued to hold controlling interest in Churchill Downs. A new management team was hired and changes were made to the structure, including the addition of a new clubhouse. Louisville mayor Charles F. Grainger was named president and Matt Winn, W. E. Applegate's tailor at the time, was named vice president in charge of the catering operation. Winn eventually became general manager of Churchill Downs.

Applegate's interest in horse racing was not limited to bookmaking and track ownership. Around 1889, he partnered with Charles McMeekin to establish Oakwood Stud breeding farm near Lexington, Kentucky. Oakwood was home of Fonso (winner of the 1880 Kentucky Derby), Badge, Hayden Edwards and British import Simon Magus, who was struck by lightning soon after being purchased in 1898. Among the horses bred by Oakwood were Bannockburn, Ben Eder, First Mate and Go Between. Ben Eder was beaten by a head by Ben Brush in the Kentucky Derby in 1896. W. E. Applegate sold his interest in Oakwood to McMeekin in 1899.

One of the first of many horses owned by Applegate was Glasgow, a celebrated jumper. Other winners included, Prince McClurg, Round the World, Ginger, Hy Schneider, Tonic (winning a race in Japan), and Jack Hare Jr., winning the Preakness in Pimlico in 1918. The winner of the 1914 Kentucky Derby, Old Rosebud, was owned by W. E. Applegate's son, Hamilton Applegate, Treasurer of Churchill Downs.

When W. E. Applegate died at age 76, he was considered the oldest living member of the Louisville Jockey Club.
