= Woodford Stakes =

- Class: Grade II
- Location: Keeneland Race Course; Lexington, Kentucky, United States
- Inaugurated: 1997
- Race type: Thoroughbred – Flat racing
- Sponsor: FanDuel (2022)
- Website: Keeneland

Race information
- Distance: 5 1/2 furlongs
- Surface: Turf
- Track: Left-handed
- Qualification: Three-years-old and older
- Weight: Base weights with allowances: 4-year-olds and up: 124 lbs. 3-year-olds: 122 lbs.
- Purse: US$400,000 (2025)

The Woodford Stakes is a Grade II American thoroughbred horse race for horses age three and older over a distance of 5 1/2 furlongs on the turf held annually in early October at Keeneland Race Course in Lexington, Kentucky during the fall meeting.

== History ==
The event was inaugurated as the Nureyev Stakes on 11 October 1997 and was won by the Calumet Farm owned Sesaro, sired by the champion Danzig and ridden by Shane Sellers drawing clear near the finishing line to won by 3/4 length in a time of 1:02.96.

The event was named in honor of the Champion sire, Nureyev.

In 2003 the event was renamed for Woodford County, Kentucky. It was known as the Woodford County Stakes until 2006 when it became the Woodford Stakes.

Previously a Listed race, it was upgraded to Grade III status for 2009 and then Grade II in 2017 by the American Graded Stakes Committee.

In recent years the race has gained prominence as a preparatory race for the Breeders' Cup Turf Sprint since it usually held about three to four weeks to the event. In 2015 the event was run off the turf due to inclement weather and was won by Amelia's Wild Ride by the event's longest winning margin to date of 2 1/2 lengths defeating Mongolian Saturday. Mongolian Saturday proceeded to win the Breeders' Cup Turf Sprint on his next start at Keeneland. The following year, 2016, Mongolian Saturday resumed after a three-month spell winning the Woodford Stakes.

== Records ==
Speed record

- 5 1/2 furlongs: 1:01.39 – Golden Pal (2022)

Margins

- 2 1/2 lengths – Amelia's Wild Ride (2015)

Most wins

- 2 – Morluc (2000, 2001)
- 2 – Sgt. Bert (2005, 2006)
- 2 – Silver Timber (2009, 2010)
- 2 – Havelock (2011, 2013)
- 2 – Bucchero (2017, 2018)
- 2 – Golden Pal (2021, 2022)

Most wins by an owner

- 3 – Derrick Smith, Mrs. John Magnier & Michael Tabor (2014, 2021, 2022)

Most wins by a jockey

- 3 – Rafael Bejarano (2004, 2005, 2006)

Most wins by a trainer

- 3 – Wesley A. Ward (2014, 2021, 2022)

== Winners ==
Year	Winner	Age	Jockey	Trainer	Owner	Distance	Time	Purse	Grade	Ref
Woodford Stakes
2026	Joe Shiesty	5	Fernando De La Cruz	Eric N. Foster	Foster Family Racing, Lonnie Reynolds, Vicki Mills and Donald Coomes	5 1/2 furlongs	1:02.58	$400,000	II	
2025	Khaadem (IRE)	9	Frankie Dettori	Charlie Hills	Mrs. Fitriani Hay	5 1/2 furlongs	1:02.18	$339,075	II	
2024	Our Shot	5	Luis Saez	John P. Terranova II	Gatsas Stables, Steven Schoenfeld & John P. Terranova II	5 1/2 furlongs	1:02.36	$320,463	II	
2023	Arzak	5	Joel Rosario	Michael Trombetta	Sonata Stable	5 1/2 furlongs	1:01.65	$337,875	II	
2022	Golden Pal	4	Irad Ortiz Jr.	Wesley A. Ward	Derrick Smith, Mrs. John Magnier & Michael Tabor & Westerburg	5 1/2 furlongs	1:01.39	$315,175	II	
2021	Golden Pal	3	John Velazquez	Wesley A. Ward	Derrick Smith, Mrs. John Magnier & Michael Tabor & Westerburg	5 1/2 furlongs	1:03.12	$200,000	II	
2020	Leinster	5	Luis Saez	George R. Arnold II	Amy E. Dunne, Brenda Miley, Westrock Stables & Jean Wilkinson	5 1/2 furlongs	1:01.59	$150,000	II	
2019	Stubbins	3	Joel Rosario	Doug F. O'Neill	McShane Racing	5 1/2 furlongs	1:01.44	$200,000	II	
2018	Bucchero	6	Fernando De La Cruz	Tim Glyshaw	Ironhorse Racing Stable	5 1/2 furlongs	1:04.04	$200,000	II	
2017	Bucchero	5	Fernando De La Cruz	Tim Glyshaw	Ironhorse Racing Stable	5 1/2 furlongs	1:03.06	$200,000	II	
2016	Mongolian Saturday	6	Carlos Montalvo	Enebish Ganbat	Mongolian Saturday	5 1/2 furlongs	1:03:46	$150,000	III	
2015	Amelia's Wild Ride	4	Jose Lezcano	Ramon Preciado	Silver Trail Stables	5 1/2 furlongs	1:02:97	$150,000	III	Off turf
2014	No Nay Never	3	Mike E. Smith	Wesley A. Ward	Ice Wine Stables, Mrs. John Magnier, Michael B. Tabor & Derrick Smith	5 1/2 furlongs	1:03.59	$150,000	III	
2013	Havelock	6	Garrett K. Gomez	Darrin Miller	Silverton Hill	5 1/2 furlongs	1:03.17	$150,000	III	
2012	Bridgetown	5	Javier Castellano	Todd A. Pletcher	Melnyk Racing Stables	5 1/2 furlongs	1:02.55	$150,000	III	
2011	Havelock	4	Robby Albarado	Darrin Miller	Silverton Hills	5 1/2 furlongs	1:01.96	$150,000	III	
2010	Silver Timber	7	Julien R. Leparoux	Chad C. Brown	Michael Dubb & High Grade Racing Stable	5 1/2 furlongs	1:02.30	$100,000	III	
2009	Silver Timber	6	Julien R. Leparoux	Chad C. Brown	Michael Dubb	5 1/2 furlongs	1:04.67	$125,000	III	
2008	Chamberlain Bridge	4	Jamie Theriot	W. Bret Calhoun	Carl R. Moore Management	5 1/2 furlongs	1:02.39	$150,000	Listed	
2007	Fort Prado	6	René R. Douglas	Chris M. Block	Team Block	5 1/2 furlongs	1:03.20	$112,600	Listed	
2006	Sgt. Bert	5	Rafael Bejarano	Gary Montgomery	C. Gary Edelen & Fred Preuss Jr.	5 1/2 furlongs	1:01.67	$114,600	Listed	
2005	Sgt. Bert	4	Rafael Bejarano	Gary Montgomery	C. Gary Edelen & Fred Preuss Jr.	5 1/2 furlongs	1:04.06	$112,800	Listed	
Woodford County Stakes
2004	Battle Won	4	Rafael Bejarano	Charles Simon	Jay Manoogian	5 1/2 furlongs	1:02.70	$84,675	Listed	
2003	Joe's Son Joey	5	Robby Albarado	Timothy A. Hills	Joseph R. Lunetta	5 1/2 furlongs	1:03.49	$84,525	Listed	
Nureyev Stakes
2002	Manofglory	5	Jorge F. Chavez	Benjamin W. Perkins Jr.	Raymond Dweck	5 1/2 furlongs	1:03.99	$84,450	Listed	
2001	Morluc	5	Robby Albarado	Randy L. Morse	Michael P. Cloonan	5 1/2 furlongs	1:02.22	$83,025	Listed	
2000	Morluc	4	Shane Sellers	Randy L. Morse	Michael P. Cloonan	5 1/2 furlongs	1:02.20	$83,700	Listed	
1999	Howbaddouwantit	4	Dale Beckner	Benjamin W. Perkins Jr.	Larry F. Hall	5 1/2 furlongs	1:02.00	$69,875	Listed	
1998	Soldier Field	3	Rick Wilson	Linda L. Rice	David Sepler	5 1/2 furlongs	1:03.00	$66,250	Listed	
1997	Sesaro	5	Shane Sellers	Charles LoPresti	Calumet Farm	5 1/2 furlongs	1:02.80	$69,500	Listed	

Legend:
Turf Dirt

== See also ==
- List of American and Canadian Graded races
