= Mike Repole =

American entrepreneur (born 1969)

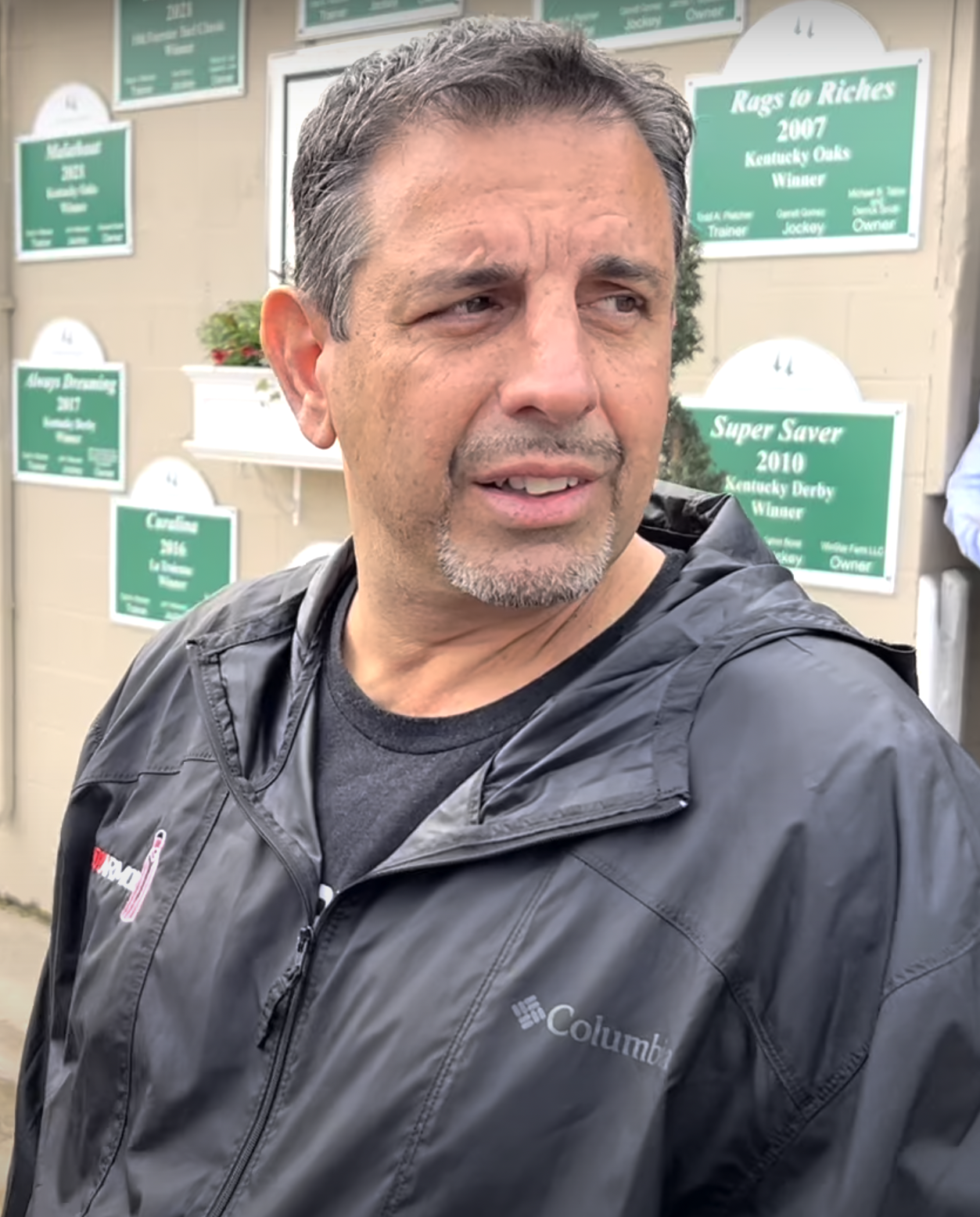
- Repole in 2023
- Born: January 21, 1969 (age 57); New York City, US
- Education: St. John's University
- Occupations: Founder of Bodyarmor SuperDrink and Glacéau; Co-owner of United Football League (UFL); Majority holder of NoBull
- Spouse: Maria
- Children: 1

Mike Repole (born January 21, 1969) is an American entrepreneur, businessman, and racehorse owner. He is best known for co-founding Glaceau (maker of Vitaminwater), which sold to Coca-Cola for $4.1 billion, and BODYARMOR SuperDrink, a sports drink manufacturer, which also sold to Coca-Cola for $5.6 billion.

== Personal life ==
Repole was born on January 21, 1969, in Middle Village, Queens, New York City, to mother Annie Repole, a seamstress, and father Benny Repole, a waiter. Repole's parents, Italian immigrants, were devout Catholics. He grew up in Middle Village, and attended St. Margaret's Elementary and Holy Cross High School. Repole, the first in his family to go to college, went to St. John's University and graduated with a degree in Sports Administration.

Repole lives on Long Island with his wife Maria and their daughter.

Repole has acknowledged a personality profile consistent with hyperthymic temperament, including an unusually short sleep cycle, high energy, self-assurance and a constant need to be working on projects.

== Career ==
Repole first began his career at Mistic Beverages. He later joined Crystal Geyser Water Company as Vice President of Sales. In 1999, Repole co-founded, with J. Darius Bikoff, Energy Brands, commonly known as Glaceau, which produced Smartwater and Vitaminwater, and which was credited with launching the enhanced water beverage vertical. The company grew quickly, netting $1 million in its first year, and growing to over $1 billion in sales by 2007, when it was the top-selling water brand in the US. In 2007, Coca-Cola bought the company for $4.1 billion.

In 2009, Repole joined Pirate's Booty as chairman of the board. He helped the company grow 300% in less than five years. In 2013, Pirate Brands sold for $195 million to B&G Foods.

In 2011, Repole co-founded BodyArmor Superdrink, a sports drinks company, with Lance Collins. BodyArmor, usually stylized BODYARMOR, garnered media attention in 2014 when Kobe Bryant, a professional basketball player, invested $5 million for 10% of the company and became the company's creative director. Bryant was additionally the fourth largest stakeholder in the company, and Repole currently serves as chairman of the company. In August 2018, Coca-Cola became the second-largest stakeholder in BodyArmor in an attempt to further challenge rival Pepsi's hold, via its Gatorade brand, on the sports drink industry. According to Nielsen data, BodyArmor is the third most purchased sports drink, with expected revenues of $400 million in 2018. In November 2021, Coca-Cola announced it was purchasing the remaining 85% of the company for $5.6 billion.

In 2019, Repole co-starred in the Barstool Sports investment show "Big Brain," where he served as a financial advisor to Dave Portnoy, alongside Jon Taffer.

In July 2023, Repole took a majority stake in the athletic footwear and apparel brand NoBull. In January 2024, Tom Brady's athletic brands partnered and merged with Repole's NoBULL.

In July 2025, Repole announced his investment into the United Football League.

=== Horse racing ===
Repole became a horse racing fan in his teenage years. During his time at Glaceau, he became increasingly involved in horse racing and thoroughbred ownership, and, after selling Glaceau, he opened Repole Stable. His most accomplished horse, Uncle Mo, was named the American Champion Two-Year-Old in 2010, and was one of the most popular racehorse sires, having sired Kentucky Derby winner Nyquist, among others. Repole's horse, Vino Rosso, won the Breeders' Cup Classic in 2019. The stables' other notable horses include Coach Inge, Notacatbutallama, Caixa Eletronica and multiple Grade 1 winner Stay Thirsty. His horse Mo Donegal was winner of the 2022 Belmont Stakes. Finishing in second place in the same race was his horse Nest.

In 2023, he won the Florida Derby with his horse Forte and also won the Breeders' Cup Juvenile by 6 1/4 length in 2023 with Fierceness.

By 2026, Repole had emerged as one of the most aggressive buyers of yearlings in the horse racing business and spent tens of millions of dollars on horse purchases between 2021 and 2025, netting 191 horses between 2021 and 2023. Of those, 147 eventually became racehorses, 105 won at least one race and 16 won at least one stakes race. Repole indicated an intention to reduce his investments in racehorses in 2026 because of his belief that the horse racing business was in decline.
