= Jack Hare Jr. =

American-bred Thoroughbred racehorse

- Sire: Marathon
- Grandsire: Martagon
- Dam: Moonet
- Damsire: Donald A.
- Sex: Stallion
- Foaled: 1915
- Country: United States
- Colour: Brown/Bay
- Breeder: W. E. Walsh
- Owner: Col. William E. Applegate
- Trainer: Frank D. Weir
- Record: ?? 11-?-?
- Earnings: Not found

Major wins
- Nursery Handicap (1917); Troy Claiming Stakes (1917); Babylon Handicap (1917); Wilmington Stakes (1918); Woodberry Handicap (1918); Empire City Derby (1918); Southampton Handicap (1918); Red Cross Handicap (1918); American Classics wins: Preakness Stakes (1918)
- Last updated on May 8, 2020

Jack Hare Jr. (1915 – after 1930) was an American Thoroughbred racehorse best known for winning a division of the May 15, 1918 Preakness Stakes. Owned by Colonel William E. Applegate, he was sired by Marathon. Jack Hare Jr. was out of the mare Moonet, a daughter of Donald A.

== Early racing career ==
As a two-year-old in 1917, Jack Hare Jr. did very well on the race track winning a maiden race, an allowance race, the Grab Bag Stakes and Babylon Handicap and the Troy Claiming Stakes at Saratoga Race Course. The highlight of his freshman year was his win over War Cloud, another future Preakness Stakes winner, in the Nursery Handicap at Belmont Park with a winning time of 1:11-2/5 for the six furlong race.

== Preakness Stakes ==
The 43rd running of the Preakness Stakes was run at a mile and one eighth on dirt at Pimlico Race Course on an unusual day of the week, Wednesday, May 15, 1918. The race was divided into two divisions, with Jack Hare Jr. running in the second. The first division was won by War Cloud. When the horses started, Jack Hare Jr., the 9/10 favorite, rushed straight to lead drew away by two lengths passing the stands for the first time. Rounding the club house turn he widened his lead to two and a half finishing the first half mile in :47-3/5. He continued to set a fast pace on the front end setting fractions of 1:12-3/5 and 1:39-3/5 for 3/4 and a mile. Leading comfortably by three lengths at the head of the stretch his jockey Charles Peak eased him up near the end of the race and still won by more than two lengths. The order of finish remained almost unchanged throughout the race with The Porter finishing second six lengths ahead of Kate Brite and Trompe La Mort for third and fourth. The race appears to have been run as a handicap race, with Jack Hare Jr. carrying eight pounds more than the runner-up. The winning time of 1:53.4 was 0.2 seconds faster than the first division.

== Later racing career ==
Jack Hare Jr. continued to race the balance of the year in 1918. He won five more stakes races that year namely the Wilmington Stakes, Woodberry Handicap, the Empire City Derby at Empire City Race Track, the Southampton Handicap at Jamaica Race Course in New York and the Red Cross Handicap.

== Stud career ==
Jack Hare Jr. was not a successful sire. Standing for many years at Military Stock Farm in Lexington, he was sold in April 1930 to Alex Bower for use as a sire for Saddlebred horses.

== Pedigree ==
Pedigree of Jack Hare Jr (USA), brown stallion, 1915
Sire Marathon (USA) 1904	Martagon (GB); 1887	Bend Or	Doncaster
Sire Marathon (USA) 1904	Martagon (GB); 1887	Bend Or	Rouge Rose
Sire Marathon (USA) 1904	Martagon (GB); 1887	Tiger Lily	Macaroni
Sire Marathon (USA) 1904	Martagon (GB); 1887	Tiger Lily	Polly Agnes
Sire Marathon (USA) 1904	Ondulee (GB); 1898	St Simon	Galopin
Sire Marathon (USA) 1904	Ondulee (GB); 1898	St Simon	St Angela
Sire Marathon (USA) 1904	Ondulee (GB); 1898	Ornis	Bend Or
Sire Marathon (USA) 1904	Ondulee (GB); 1898	Ornis	Shotover
Dam Moonet (USA) 1902	Donald A (USA); 1881	Scottish Chief (GB)	Lord of the Isles
Dam Moonet (USA) 1902	Donald A (USA); 1881	Scottish Chief (GB)	Miss Ann
Dam Moonet (USA) 1902	Donald A (USA); 1881	Algebra (GB)	Diophantus
Dam Moonet (USA) 1902	Donald A (USA); 1881	Algebra (GB)	Beatrice
Dam Moonet (USA) 1902	Koenigen (USA); 1894	Masetto (GB)	St Simon
Dam Moonet (USA) 1902	Koenigen (USA); 1894	Masetto (GB)	Lady Abbess
Dam Moonet (USA) 1902	Koenigen (USA); 1894	Gillian (GB)	The Rake
Dam Moonet (USA) 1902	Koenigen (USA); 1894	Gillian (GB)	Sea Breeze (Family 5-a)

- Jack Hare Jr was inbred 3 × 4 to both Bend Or and St Simon.
