= 2022 Belmont Stakes =

American horse race

154th Belmont Stakes
- Belmont Stakes
- Grade I stakes race
- Location: Belmont Park; Elmont, New York, United States
- Date: June 11, 2022
- Distance: 1 1/2 miles (12 furlongs)
- Winning horse: Mo Donegal
- Winning time: 2:28.28
- Final odds: 2.60 (to 1)
- Jockey: Irad Ortiz Jr.
- Trainer: Todd Pletcher
- Owner: Donegal Racing & Repole Stable
- Conditions: Fast
- Surface: Dirt
- Attendance: 46,301

The 2022 Belmont Stakes was the 154th running of the Belmont Stakes and the 111th time the event would take place at Belmont Park in Elmont, New York. The 1 1/2-mile (2,410 m) race, known as the "test of the champion", is the final leg in the American Triple Crown, open to three-year-old Thoroughbreds. The race was won by Mo Donegal.

The race took place on Saturday, June 11, with an actual start time of 6:44 p.m. EDT; television coverage was on NBC. It was a Grade I stakes race with a purse of $1.5 million.

The race was run without a Triple Crown at stake, as the Kentucky Derby and Preakness Stakes had already been won by different horses: Kentucky Derby winner Rich Strike bypassed the Preakness (and gave up the chance to become Triple Crown winner), while Preakness winner Early Voting did not enter the Kentucky Derby or the Belmont Stakes. None of the Belmont horses ran in all three Triple Crown races (thereby making a Triple Crown impossible).

== Field ==
A field of eight was drawn for the Belmont Stakes on Tuesday, June 7; We The People was installed as the favorite at 2-1. Mo Donegal, who finished fifth in the Kentucky Derby, was the second choice pick at 5-2, while Derby winner Rich Strike was the third choice pick at 7-2. Nest, the only filly in the field, looked to become the fourth filly to win the Belmont Stakes; the last was Rags to Riches in 2007.

== Result ==
Finish	Program Numbers	Horse	Jockey	Trainer	Morning Line Odds	Final Odds	Margin (Lengths)	Winnings
1	6	Mo Donegal	Irad Ortiz Jr.	Todd A. Pletcher	5-2	2.60		$800,000
2	3	ƒ Nest	José Ortiz	Todd A. Pletcher	8-1	5.30	3	$280,000
3	2	Skippylongstocking	Manny Franco	Saffie A. Joseph Jr.	20-1	11.80	6 1/4	$150,000
4	1	We The People	Flavien Prat	Rodolphe Brisset	2-1	3.90	7	$100,000
5	5	Creative Minister	Brian Hernandez Jr.	Kenneth G. McPeek	6-1	7.70	12	$60,000
6	4	Rich Strike	Sonny Leon	Eric Reed	7-2	4.10	13 1/4	$45,000
7	8	Barber Road	Joel Rosario	John Ortiz	10-1	8.70	17 1/2	$35,000
8	7	Golden Glider	Dylan Davis	Mark E. Casse	20-1	14.60	24 1/2	$30,000

ƒ Filly
Track condition: Fast

Times: 1/4 mile – 23.99; 1/2 mile – 48.49; 3/4 mile – 1:13.23; mile – 1:37.74; 1 1/4 miles – 2:03.06; final – 2:28.28
Splits for each quarter-mile: (24:50) (24:74) (24:51) (25:32) (25:22)

== Payout ==
Based on a $2 bet:

Program Number	Horse	Win	Place	Show
6	Mo Donegal	$7.20	$3.80	$3.00
3	Nest	–	$5.30	$4.10
2	Skippylongstocking	–	–	$5.60

- $1 Exacta: (6–3) $13.80
- $1 Trifecta: (6–3–2) $187.50
- $1 Superfecta: (6–3–2–1) $692.00
