= Troy Stakes =

- Class: Grade II
- Location: Saratoga Race Course; Saratoga Springs, New York, United States
- Inaugurated: 1901 as Troy Claiming Stakes (1901–1938) Renewal: Troy Purse (1954–1955) Current: Troy Stakes (2004)
- Race type: Thoroughbred – Flat racing
- Website: NYRA

Race information
- Distance: 5 1/2 furlongs
- Surface: Turf
- Track: Left-handed
- Qualification: Three years old and older
- Weight: 124 lbs. with allowances
- Purse: US$300,000

The Troy Stakes is a Grade II American Thoroughbred horse race for horses aged three years old and older over the distance of 5 1/2 furlongs on the turf scheduled annually in August at Saratoga Race Course in Saratoga Springs, New York. The event currently carries a purse of $300,000.

== History ==
=== Modern Era ===
The current rendition of the race was renewed in 2004 with the first two runnings on the Inner Turf course at a distance of 1 mile with conditions for 4-year-olds and up and was held in August.

In 2006, the distance was changed to 5 1/2 furlongs on the main turf track, but was still restricted to four-year-olds and up. From in 2011 until 2019, the race was open to three-year-olds and up.

In 2014, an abundance of rain necessitated the move of the race from the turf and onto the main dirt track, where it was run at 5 1/2 furlongs.

In 2024 the event was upgraded to Grade III by the Thoroughbred Owners and Breeders Association, but was rescheduled due to the state of the track, and was ultimately held on the dirt.

In 2026 the event was upgraded by the Thoroughbred Owners and Breeders Association to a Grade II.

=== Previous runnings ===
==== Troy Claiming Stakes ====
From 1901 to 1938 Saratoga held an event known as the Troy Claiming Stakes which was a claiming event for two-year-olds at a distance of 5 1/2 furlongs. The structure of claiming events in the early 20th century were different from the modern era. There wasn't a fixed price, and a claim did not mean that ownership of the horse changed at the start of the race. Instead, after the race, the winner was presented to the other owners and trainers of horses in the race, and if any chose to, they could offer the sum for which the runner had been entered. But even that did not mean the horse changed hands. If anyone offered to buy the horse for the claiming price, the existing owner then could bid to retain the horse, and the price could run up far above the entered claiming price, sometimes even higher than the sum of the purse won and the claiming price together. This more personal and contentious manner of “claiming” horses led to numerous backstretch feuds and considerable ill will.

Of the more notable participants of the Troy Claiming Stakes were Frizette who won the event in 1907. Later the filly was claimed and was sent to France in 1908 and stood at Herman B. Duryea's Haras du Gazon stud. He sent the mare to his high-class American-raced Irish Lad, and the result was Banshee, winner of the classic Poule d'Essai des Pouliches (French 1,000 Guineas) in 1913. Today NYRA honors Frizette with a Grade I event for two-year-old fillies, the Frizette Stakes that is run at Belmont Park in the fall. The 1917 winner Jack Hare Jr. who later went on to win the second division of the 1918 Preakness Stakes at Pimlico Race Course. The Classic winner Belair Stud's Faireno also participated in the 1931 edition of the event finishing third to Sagamore Farm's Towee. The following year Faireno won the Belmont Stakes. The 1938 running was the final running of the event.

==== Troy Purse (Jamaica) ====
In 1954 the event was held at the Saratoga-at-Jamaica meeting at Jamaica Race Course and was called the Troy Purse. The event was once again open for two-year-olds at a distance of 5 1/2 furlongs. The 1954 renewal was won by Sound Barrier. The following year the event was won by Reneged who defeated Canadian Champ after lengthy delay due to the objection raised by jockey Dave Stevenson for interference which was dismissed. Canadian Champ the following year would become Canadian Horse of the Year.

== Records ==
Speed record:

- 5 1/2 furlongs on the turf – 1:00.23 – Leinster (2019)
- 5 1/2 furlongs on the dirt – 1:05.00 – Reneged (1955)

Margins:

- 6 3/4 lengths – Bridgetown (2010)

Most wins by a jockey

- 4 – John R. Velazquez (2004, 2005, 2011, 2012)
- 4 – Tyler Gaffalione (2019, 2020, 2021, 2024)

Most wins by a trainer

- 3 – Todd A. Pletcher (2004, 2011, 2012)
- 3 – Sam Hildreth (1922, 1923, 1924)

Most wins by an owner

- 2 – Linda L. Rice & F E Que Stable (2009, 2010)
- 2 – Melnyk Racing Stables (2011, 2012)
- 2 – Brad Grady (2015, 2021)

== Winners ==
=== Troy Stakes (2004– ) ===
Year	Winner	Age	Jockey	Trainer	Owner	Distance	Time	Purse	Grade	Ref
Troy Stakes
2026	John the Beer Man	5	Kendrick Carmouche	Rob Atras	Michael J. Caruso & Michael Dubb	5 1/2 furlongs	1:00.97	$300,000	II	
2025	Bring Theband Home	5	Javier Castellano	Mark E. Casse	Live Oak Plantation	5 1/2 furlongs	1:00.38	$300,000	III	
2024	Surveillance	7	Tyler Gaffalione	Wayne Potts	Winning Move Stable (Sigler family)	5 1/2 furlongs	1:04.41	$291,000	III	
2023	Cogburn	4	Ricardo Santana Jr.	Steven M. Asmussen	Clark O.Brewster, William L. & Corinne Heiligbrodt	5 1/2 furlongs	1:03.70	$300,000	III	
2022	Golden Pal	4	Irad Ortiz Jr.	Wesley A. Ward	Derrick Smith, Mrs. John Magnier & Michael Tabor, & Westerberg	5 1/2 furlongs	1:00.92	$300,000	III	
2021	Fast Boat	6	Tyler Gaffalione	Joe Sharp	Brad Grady	5 1/2 furlongs	1:01.24	$200,000	III	
2020	† American Sailor	8	Tyler Gaffalione	Wayne Potts	Raj Jagnanan	5 1/2 furlongs	1:01.27	$200,000	III	
2019	Leinster	4	Tyler Gaffalione	George R. Arnold II	Amy E. Dunne	5 1/2 furlongs	1:00.23	$194,000	III	
Troy Handicap
2018	Sandy'z Slew	8	José L. Ortiz	Jeremiah C. Englehart	James A. Riccio	5 1/2 furlongs	1:05.07	$200,000	III	
2017	Green Mask	6	Javier Castellano	Brad H. Cox	Abdullah Saeed Almaddah	5 1/2 furlongs	1:00.49	$250,000	Listed	
Troy Stakes
2016	Disco Partner	4	José L. Ortiz	James T. Ryerson	Patricia A. Generazio	5 1/2 furlongs	1:00.93	$100,000	Listed	
2015	Shore Runner	5	Kendrick Carmouche	Joe Sharp	Brad Grady	5 1/2 furlongs	1:02.18	$98,000	Listed	
2014	Spring to the Sky	6	Javier Castellano	Bruce R. Brown	Anthony P. McCarthy	5 1/2 furlongs	1:04.01	$98,000	Listed	Off turf
2013	Hogy	4	Joseph Rocco Jr.	Wayne M. Catalano	William Stiritz	5 1/2 furlongs	1:02.61	$98,000	Listed	
2012	Bridgetown	5	John R. Velazquez	Todd A. Pletcher	Melnyk Racing Stables	5 1/2 furlongs	1:01.52	$100,000	Listed	
2011	Bridgetown	4	John R. Velazquez	Todd A. Pletcher	Melnyk Racing Stables	5 1/2 furlongs	1:03.13	$76,500	Listed	
2010	Awakino Cat	5	Alan Garcia	Linda L. Rice	Linda L. Rice & F E Que Stable	5 1/2 furlongs	1:01.90	$70,000	Listed	
2009	Awakino Cat	4	Alan Garcia	Linda L. Rice	Linda L. Rice & F E Que Stable	5 1/2 furlongs	1:01.39	$73,250	Listed	
2008	Ferocious Fires	5	Cornelio Velasquez	Anthony W. Dutrow	Sanford J. Goldfarb	5 1/2 furlongs	1:04.23	$84,050	Listed	Off turf
2007	T. D. Vance	5	Garrett K. Gomez	H. Graham Motion	Donald A. Adam	5 1/2 furlongs	1:03.15	$81,700	Listed	
2006	Second in Command	6	Edgar S. Prado	Richard E. Dutrow Jr.	Michael Dubb	5 1/2 furlongs	1:01.11	$71,500		
2005	Funfair (GB)	6	John R. Velazquez	H. Graham Motion	Cheveley Park Farm	1 mile	1:38.13	$67,200		
2004	Willard Straight	4	John R. Velazquez	Todd A. Pletcher	Lawrence Goichman	1 mile	1:34.49	$66,800		

Legend:
Turf Dirt
Notes:
† In the 2020 Imprimis was first past the post but caused interference brushing the third-placed finisher in the straight and was disqualified and placed third. American Sailor was declared the winner.

=== Troy Purse (1954–1955) ===
The event was for two-year-olds over a distance of 5 1/2 furlongs on the dirt track at Saratoga-at-Jamaica meeting at Jamaica Race Course.

Year	Winner	Jockey	Trainer	Owner	Distance	Time	Purse	Grade	Ref
Troy Stakes
1955	Reneged	Paul J. Bailey	Homer C. Pardue	Woodley Lane Farm	5 1/2 furlongs	1:05.00	$12,575		
Troy Purse
1954	Sound Barrier	Eric Guerin		E. M. O'Brien	5 1/2 furlongs	1:05.40	$12,350		

=== Troy Claiming Stakes (1954–1955) ===
The event was for two-year-old claiming event over a distance of 5 1/2 furlongs on the dirt track at Saratoga.

- 1938 – Highscope
- 1937 – Wise Mentor
- 1936 – Juliet W
- 1935 – Ned Reigh
- 1934 – Uppermost
- 1933 – High Glee
- 1932 – Poppyman
- 1931 – Towee
- 1930 – Porternesia
- 1929 – Dress Ship
- 1928 – Crystal Broom
- 1927 – Sunchen
- 1926 – John J Williams
- 1925 – Lacewood
- 1924 – Pedagogue
- 1923 – Rival
- 1922 – Edict
- 1921 – Modo
- 1920 – Tody
- 1919 – His Choice
- 1918 – Questionnaire
- 1917 – Jack Hare Jr.
- 1916 – Katenka
- 1915 – Success
- 1914 – Headmast
- 1913 – Superintendent
- 1912 – Race Not Run
- 1911 – Race Not Run
- 1910 – Danger Mark
- 1909 – Mexoana
- 1908 – Obdurate
- 1907 – Frizette
- 1906 – Loring
- 1905 – Rustling Silk
- 1904 – Gold Ten
- 1903 – Divination
- 1902 – Plater
- 1901 – Five Nations
