= Caro (horse) =

Irish-bred Thoroughbred racehorse

- Sire: Fortino
- Grandsire: Grey Sovereign
- Dam: Chambord
- Damsire: Chamossaire
- Sex: Stallion
- Foaled: 1967
- Country: Ireland
- Colour: Grey
- Breeder: Margit Batthyany
- Owner: Margit Batthyany
- Trainer: Albert Klimscha
- Record: 18: 6-6-3
- Earnings: US$373,040 (converted)

Major wins
- Prix d'Ispahan (1970); Poule d'Essai des Poulains (1970); Prix Ganay (1971); Prix Dollar (1971); Prix d'Harcourt (1971)

Awards
- Leading sire in France (1977)

Caro (1967–1989) was an Irish-bred, French-trained Thoroughbred racehorse.

== Background ==
Caro was a grey horse, standing 16.3 hands (67 inches, 170 cm). He was bred in Ireland by his owner, Countess Margit Batthyany, and trained in France with Albert Klimscha

== Racing career ==
As a three-year-old in 1970, Caro won the Poule d'Essai des Poulains after the disqualification of Faraway Son. He then defeated older horses in the Prix d'Ispahan and was third in the Prix du Jockey Club. In the following year, he won the Prix d'Harcourt and the Prix Dollar and set a course record for 2,100 metres at Longchamp in winning the Prix Ganay. He also finished second to Mill Reef in the Eclipse Stakes. He was rated the French champion older male of 1971 with a Timeform rating of 133.

== Stud record ==
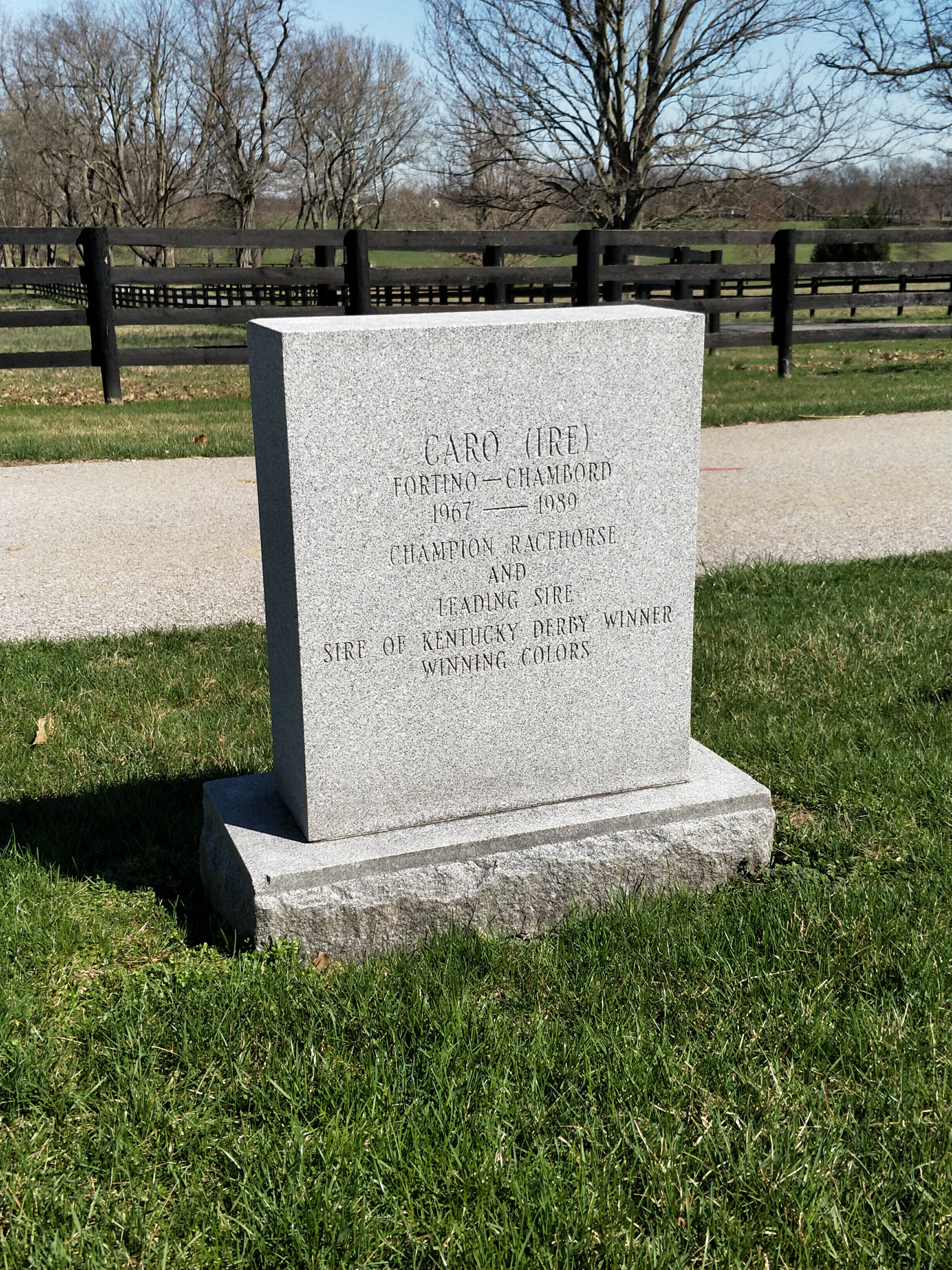
Caro's gravestone at Spendthrift Farm in Lexington, Kentucky

Although successful in racing, Caro is best known as a sire both in France, where he was the leading sire in 1977, and in the United States. Caro was sent to Spendthrift Farm in Lexington, Kentucky in the late summer of 1977, where he was highly successful. He died there in 1989 and is buried in their equine cemetery. Caro sired 78 stakes winners including:

- Theia (foaled 1973) - 1975 Critérium des Pouliches, French Champion Two-Year-Old Filly
- Madelia (1974) - won Prix de Diane, Poule d'Essai des Pouliches, Prix Saint-Alary, French Champion Three-Year-Old Filly, retired undefeated
- Crystal Palace (1974) - won Prix du Jockey Club, Leading sire in France (1985)
- Nebos (1976) - 1980 German Horse of the Year, Champion Sire and Champion Broodmare Sire in Germany
- Cozzene (1980) - won Breeders' Cup Mile (1985), American Champion Male Turf Horse (1985)
- Dr. Carter (1981) - multiple Grade 1 winner
- Siberian Express (1981) - Poule d'Essai des Poulains winner, ancestor of 2016 Kentucky Derby winner Nyquist
- Caro's Love (1984) - Broke a 38-year-old track record at Golden Gate Fields Ca, winning a mile race in 1:33, running the fastest 2 turn mile in U.S.A. history.
- Tejano (1985) - at two, won the Hollywood Futurity, Arlington-Washington Futurity Stakes, Cowdin Stakes
- Winning Colors (1985) - won 1988 Kentucky Derby, inducted into the United States Racing Hall of Fame
- Turgeon (1986) - European Champion Stayer (1991)
- With Approval (1986) - Canadian Triple Crown winner, Canadian Horse of the Year, Canadian Horse Racing Hall of Fame
- Golden Pheasant (b. 1986) - won 1989 Prix Niel (France), 1990 Arlington Million (United States), 1990 Japan Cup (Japan)

Caro was the broodmare sire of 134 stakes winners, including:

- Red Bullet (b. 1997) - won Preakness Stakes (2000)
- Maria's Mon (b. 1993) - 1995 American Champion Two-Year-Old Colt
- Unbridled's Song (b. 1993) - won 1995 Breeders' Cup Juvenile, 1996 Florida Derby
- Tactical Cat (b. 1996) - won Hollywood Futurity

== Pedigree ==
Pedigree of Caro
Sire Fortino (FR) 1959	Grey Sovereign (GB); 1948	Nasrullah	Nearco
Sire Fortino (FR) 1959	Grey Sovereign (GB); 1948	Nasrullah	Mumtaz Begum
Sire Fortino (FR) 1959	Grey Sovereign (GB); 1948	Kong	Baytown
Sire Fortino (FR) 1959	Grey Sovereign (GB); 1948	Kong	Clang
Sire Fortino (FR) 1959	Ranavalo (FR); 1954	Relic	War Relic
Sire Fortino (FR) 1959	Ranavalo (FR); 1954	Relic	Bridal Colors
Sire Fortino (FR) 1959	Ranavalo (FR); 1954	Navarra	Orsenigo
Sire Fortino (FR) 1959	Ranavalo (FR); 1954	Navarra	Nervesa
Dam Chambord (GB) 1955	Chamossaire (GB); 1942	Precipitation	Hurry On
Dam Chambord (GB) 1955	Chamossaire (GB); 1942	Precipitation	Double Life
Dam Chambord (GB) 1955	Chamossaire (GB); 1942	Snowberry	Cameronian
Dam Chambord (GB) 1955	Chamossaire (GB); 1942	Snowberry	Myrobella
Dam Chambord (GB) 1955	Life Hill (GB); 1940	Solario	Gainsborough
Dam Chambord (GB) 1955	Life Hill (GB); 1940	Solario	Sun Worship
Dam Chambord (GB) 1955	Life Hill (GB); 1940	Lady of the Snows	Manna
Dam Chambord (GB) 1955	Life Hill (GB); 1940	Lady of the Snows	Arctic Night
