= Indian Charlie =

American-bred Thoroughbred racehorse

- Sire: In Excess
- Grandsire: Siberian Express
- Dam: Soviet Sojourn
- Damsire: Leo Castelli
- Sex: Stallion
- Foaled: 1995
- Country: United States
- Colour: Bay
- Breeder: Hal J. Earnhardt
- Owner: Hal Earnhardt and John Gaines Racing
- Trainer: Bob Baffert
- Record: 5: 4–0–1
- Earnings: US$616,120

Major wins
- Santa Anita Derby (1998)

Indian Charlie (March 27, 1995 – December 15, 2011) was an American Thoroughbred racehorse who won the 1998 Grade 1 Santa Anita Derby, equaling the stakes record time, before finishing third in the Kentucky Derby in his final start. He is best known as an important sire of Champions, and his son Uncle Mo was the leading freshman sire of 2015.

== Racing career ==
Indian Charlie won his first four races, including a 4 1/2 length victory over Real Quiet in the Santa Anita Derby, equaling the stakes record of 1:47 flat. He started at odds of 5/2 for the Kentucky Derby, in which he finished third to Real Quiet. He was rested after the Derby and missed the Preakness and Belmont Stakes. He was being prepared for a return to racing in the Haskell Invitational in August when he pulled a suspensory ligament during training at Del Mar Racetrack and was retired from racing.

== Stud record ==
Indian Charlie entered stud at Vinery in Central Kentucky for a $10,000 fee. As a freshman sire in 2002, he ranked in the top 10 by progeny earnings and was represented by one stakes winner. As a second-crop sire, he stayed in the top 10 by earnings but still needed that breakout runner.

Indian Charlie stood at Airdrie Stud near Midway, Kentucky where his stud fee for 2011 was set at $70,000. To date he has sired four champions:

- Fleet Indian, American Champion Older Female Horse (2006) multiple Grade 1 winner of $1.7 million
- Indian Blessing, won 2007 Breeders' Cup Juvenile Fillies, American Champion Two-Year-Old Filly (2007), American Champion Female Sprint Horse (2008), earned $2,995,420
- Indian Apple Is, 2010 Canadian Champion Female Sprint Horse
- Uncle Mo, won 2010 Breeders' Cup Juvenile, American Champion Two-Year-Old Colt. Leading freshman sire of 2015

Among his other notable progeny, Indian Charlie is the sire of multiple stakes winners A. P. Indian, Conveyance, Bwana Charlie, Indian Firewater, Iindyanne, Mr. Nightlinger, My Pal Charlie, Pampered Princess, Roxy Gap, Two Trail Sioux, Zada Belle, as well as 2011 Robert B. Lewis Stakes winner Anthony's Cross and Jerome Stakes winner Adios Charlie.

Indian Charlie is the grandsire (through Uncle Mo) of Nyquist, American Champion Two-Year-Old Colt and winner of the 2016 Kentucky Derby.

For his career, Indian Charlie sired 83 black-type winners (8% from named foals of racing age) that included 29 graded/group winners and eight champions. His stud fee would climb to $75,000 by 2009 and his sales yearling average to more than $136,000.

As a broodmare sire, he's been represented by 15 stakes-producing daughters whose progeny have earned more than $31 million. From all his daughters, he has been represented by 93 black-type winners that include 31 graded/group winners and six champions. Hot Rod Charlie, as of November 1, 2022 is Indian Charlie's leading earner as a broodmare sire with $5,556,720 in lifetime earnings.

Recently Indian Charlie is known for being the damsire of Flightline, considered by many to be the greatest horse since Secretariat, through his daughter Feathered.

Indian Charlie was euthanized at Airdrie Stud on December 15, 2011. The sixteen-year-old had been battling cancer.

== Pedigree ==
Indian Charlie has single-handedly revived the Caro sire line that is a branch from Nasrullah through English classic-placed stakes winner Grey Sovereign. The path to this revival began with Soviet Sojourn, a daughter of Leo Castelli that Earnhardt bought as a yearling for $14,000 at the 1990 Arizona Thoroughbred Breeders Association Fall Sale from Double D Thoroughbred Farms.

Pedigree of Indian Charlie
Sire In Excess	Siberian Express	Caro	Fortino
Sire In Excess	Siberian Express	Caro	Chambord
Sire In Excess	Siberian Express	Indian Call	Warfare
Sire In Excess	Siberian Express	Indian Call	La Morlaye
Sire In Excess	Kantado	Saulingo	Sing Sing
Sire In Excess	Kantado	Saulingo	Saulisa
Sire In Excess	Kantado	Vi	Vilmorin
Sire In Excess	Kantado	Vi	Dotterell
Dam Soviet Sojourn	Leo Castelli	Sovereign Dancer	Northern Dancer
Dam Soviet Sojourn	Leo Castelli	Sovereign Dancer	Bold Princess
Dam Soviet Sojourn	Leo Castelli	Suspicious Native	Raise a Native
Dam Soviet Sojourn	Leo Castelli	Suspicious Native	Be Suspicious
Dam Soviet Sojourn	Political Parfait	Diplomat Way	Nashua
Dam Soviet Sojourn	Political Parfait	Diplomat Way	Jandy
Dam Soviet Sojourn	Political Parfait	Peach Butter	Creme Dela Creme
Dam Soviet Sojourn	Political Parfait	Peach Butter	Slipping Round
