= Siberian Express (horse) =

American-bred Thoroughbred racehorse

- Sire: Caro
- Grandsire: Fortino
- Dam: Indian Call
- Damsire: Warfare
- Sex: Stallion
- Foaled: January 25, 1981
- Country: United States
- Colour: Grey
- Breeder: Spendthrift Farm
- Owner: Mahmoud Fustok
- Trainer: Mitri Saliba; André Fabre; Roger Wojtowiez; George Mikhalides
- Record: 11:3-1-4

Major wins
- Prix Morny (1983); Poule d'Essai des Poulains (1984)

Awards
- Timeform rating 122 (1983), 125 (1984)

Siberian Express (January 25, 1981 – June 13, 1996) was an American-bred French-trained Thoroughbred racehorse and sire. He made an immediate impact as a two-year-old in 1983, leading from the start to win the Group One Prix Morny on his second racecourse appearance. He went on to be placed in the Prix de la Salamandre and the Dewhurst Stakes and was rated the second best colt of his generation in France. In the following year he won the Poule d'Essai des Poulains, but the rest of his form as a three-year-old was relatively undistinguished. After two unsuccessful runs as a four-year-old he was retired having won three of his eleven races and being handled by four different trainers. He had a mixed record as a breeding stallion, but sired one exceptional performer in the multiple Grade I winner In Excess.

== Background ==
Siberian Express was a "big, strong, rangy, most impressive-looking" grey horse bred in Kentucky by Spendthrift Farm. His sire, Caro, was a top-class performer (rated 133 by Timeform), whose wins included the Poule d'Essai des Poulains, Prix Ganay and Prix d'Ispahan, before becoming a very successful breeding stallion. Caro's other progeny included Madelia, Crystal Palace, Cozzene Theia and Winning Colors. Siberian Express's dam Indian Call made no impact as a racehorse but became a successful broodmare producing the Bowling Green Handicap winner Erwin Boy. Indian Call's great-grandmother Durazna was also the ancestor of the Irish St. Leger winner Leading Counsel and the Eclipse Award winner Ajina.

As a yearling, the colt was offered for sale at Keeneland in July 1982 and was bought for $230,000 (equivalent to $770,000 in 2025) by the Buckram Oak Farm on behalf of the Lebanese businessman and horse breeder Mahmoud Fustok. He was sent to France here he was initially trained by Mitri Saliba.

== Racing career ==
=== 1983: two-year-old season ===
Siberian Express made his racecourse debut in a maiden race over 1200 metres at Deauville Racecourse in August 1983, and led from the start to win by six lengths. Later that month, he was moved up sharply in class to contest the Group one Prix Morny over the same course and distance in which he was matched against the Prix Robert Papin winner Masarika and the Windsor Castle Stakes winner Defecting Dancer. Starting at odds of 5.3/1 and ridden by Alfred Gibert, he made an exceptionally fast start and was never seriously challenged, winning by two lengths from Ti King. Following his victory he was highly praised in the French press, being jocularly compared to the new TGV high-speed train service.

On 18 September Siberian Express started the 4/10 favourite for the Group One Prix de la Salamandre over 1400 metres on soft ground. He appeared poised to allay fears that he would be unsuited by the course as he led from the start and looked the certain winner entering the final 200 metres. In the closing stages, however, he tired badly and was caught and beaten half a length by the François Boutin-trained Seattle Song, a colt who went on to win the Washington, D.C.International. On his final appearance of the season, Siberian Express was sent to England to contest a strong renewal of the Dewhurst Stakes over seven furlongs at Newmarket Racecourse. Starting the 4/1 third favourite and led for five furlong being overtaken and finished third, beaten half a length and six lengths by El Gran Senor and Rainbow Quest.

=== 1984: three-year-old season ===
For his three-year-old season, Siberian Express was transferred to the stable of André Fabre. On his debut as a three-year-old, he ran in the Prix de Fontainebleau over 1600 metres at Longchamp in April and finished tired in third place behind Mendez and Nikos. Over the same course and distance, but on much firmer ground, he started third favourite, behind Mendez and Rousillon for the Group One Poule d'Essai des Poulains. Looking impressive before the race, he tracked the pacemakers in the early stages before taking the lead entering the straight. He always looked likely to prevail and held off the challenges of Green Paradise (also trained by Fabre) and Mendez to win by three quarters of a length and a short neck. An unusual feature was that grey horses finished first second and third in a Group One race.

Siberian Express did not reappear until August, when he was matched against older horses for the first time in the Prix Jacques Le Marois at Deauville Racecourse. Racing on his favoured firm ground, he started favourite but finished third behind Lear Fan and Palace Music. In the Prix du Moulin at Longchamp in September, he again failed to show his best form on soft ground, finishing sith of the seven runners behind Mendez. After the Moulin, Fabre was reportedly asked to become Fustok's private trainer. He declined the offer and Siberian Express was transferred to the stable of Roger Wojtowiez. The change brought no improvement as, on his final appearance of the season, he finished last of the ten runners behind Procida in the Prix de la Forêt in October.

=== 1985: four-year-old season ===
Siberian Express switched stables once again as a four-year-old, when he was trained by George Mikhalides. After finishing third on his seasonal debut he ran fifth, three lengths behind the filly Vilikaia in the Prix de la Porte Maillot over 1400 metres at Longchamp in June.

== Assessment ==
In the International Classification for 1983, Siberian Express was rated the fifth-best two-year-old in Europe behind El Gran Senor, Rainbow Quest, Lear Fan and the Prix de Condé winner Long Mick. The independent Timeform organisation gave him a rating of 122, nine pounds below their top-rated two-year-old El Gran Senor. In the following year, Siberian Express was rated eighteen pounds behind El Gran Senor, and eleven pounds behind Darshaan who was the highest-rated French-trained three-year-old. Timeform were less harsh, placing him eleven pounds behind their Horse of the Year El Gran Senor with a rating of 125. His Timeform rating deteriorated to 105 in 1985.

== Stud record ==
Siberian Express was retired from racing in 1985 and began his stud career in 1986 at the Derisley Wood stud near Newmarket, Suffolk at a fee of £9000.

By far the best of his progeny was In Excess, who showed moderate form in Europe before excelling in the United States where his wins included the Woodward Stakes, Whitney Stakes, Metropolitan Mile and Suburban Handicap. In Excess also sired the Santa Anita Derby winner Indian Charlie. The rest of Siberian Express's stud record was unremarkable, but he sired a few other good winners including Ancestral Dancer (Premio Regina Elena), Green's Bid (Woodcote Stakes) and Current Express (EBF Novices' Handicap Hurdle Final).

== Pedigree ==
Pedigree of Siberian Express (USA), grey stallion, 1981
| Sire Caro (IRE) 1967 | Fortino (FR); 1959 | Grey Sovereign (GB) | Nasrullah |
| Sire Caro (IRE) 1967 | Fortino (FR); 1959 | Grey Sovereign (GB) | Kong |
| Sire Caro (IRE) 1967 | Fortino (FR); 1959 | Ranavalo | Relic (USA) |
| Sire Caro (IRE) 1967 | Fortino (FR); 1959 | Ranavalo | Navarra (ITY) |
| Sire Caro (IRE) 1967 | Chambord (GB); 1955 | Chamossaire | Precipitation |
| Sire Caro (IRE) 1967 | Chambord (GB); 1955 | Chamossaire | Snowberry |
| Sire Caro (IRE) 1967 | Chambord (GB); 1955 | Life Hill | Solario (IRE) |
| Sire Caro (IRE) 1967 | Chambord (GB); 1955 | Life Hill | Lady of the Snows |
| Dam Indian Call 1966 | Warfare; 1957 | Determine | Alibhai (GB) |
| Dam Indian Call 1966 | Warfare; 1957 | Determine | Koubis |
| Dam Indian Call 1966 | Warfare; 1957 | War Whisk | War Glory |
| Dam Indian Call 1966 | Warfare; 1957 | War Whisk | Tidy Whisk |
| Dam Indian Call 1966 | La Morlaye; 1958 | Hafiz (FR) | Nearco (ITY) |
| Dam Indian Call 1966 | La Morlaye; 1958 | Hafiz (FR) | Double Rose (FR) |
| Dam Indian Call 1966 | La Morlaye; 1958 | Manzana | Count Fleet |
| Dam Indian Call 1966 | La Morlaye; 1958 | Manzana | Durazna (Family: 13-c) |
