= In Excess (horse) =

Irish-bred Thoroughbred racehorse

- Sire: Siberian Express
- Grandsire: Caro
- Dam: Kantado
- Damsire: Saulingo
- Sex: Stallion
- Foaled: April 8, 1987
- Country: Ireland
- Colour: Dark Bay/Brown
- Breeder: Ahmed Foustok
- Owner: Ahmed Foustok; Jack J. Munari (USA)
- Trainer: Bill O'Gorman; Bruce L. Jackson
- Record: 25: 11-2-3
- Earnings: US$1,736,733

Major wins
- Volante Handicap (1990); San Gabriel Handicap (1990); San Fernando Stakes (1991); Metropolitan Handicap (1991); Suburban Handicap (1991); Whitney Handicap (1991); Woodward Stakes (1991)

In Excess (April 8, 1987 – May 17, 2013) was a Thoroughbred racehorse who competed in England and in the United States.

== Background ==
In Excess was a bay horse bred in Ireland by his owner Ahmed Fustok. He was sired by Siberian Express, a multiple Group One winner in France. In Excess was conditioned for racing in England by Bill O'Gorman.

== Racing career ==
On his debut, In Excess won the October 5, 1989, EBF Sleeping Partner Maiden Stakes at Lingfield Park Racecourse. His next win came at age three in March 1990 in the Loddington Stakes at Leicester Racecourse, followed by a May 18 win in the 1990 King Charles II Stakes at Newmarket Racecourse. Purchased by American Jack J. Munari, In Excess was brought to race in the United States during the second half of 1990. In September, the colt scored an eight-length win in the Temperence Hill Handicap on the turf at Louisiana Downs, then was shipped to California, where he won the Volante and San Gabriel Handicaps.

On January 19, 1991, In Excess made his first start on dirt in the San Fernando Stakes at Santa Anita Park. Not only did he win, he set a new stakes record of 1:46 3/5 for one and one-eighth miles. Sent to compete in dirt races at New York tracks, In Excess swept the Metropolitan Handicap in May, the Suburban Handicap in July in a track-record time of 1:58 1/5, the Whitney Handicap in August, and the Woodward Stakes in September in a very fast 1:46 1/5. His four wins in these major events was an accomplishment not seen since the great Kelso did it thirty years earlier in 1961. In Excess was a front-running horse and despite his win in the 1¼ mile Suburban Handicap, he raced best at distances of a mile to a mile and one eighth.

Widely regarded as the best horse in America and the favorite for 1991 American Horse of the Year honors, In Excess was scheduled to compete in the November 2 1¼ mile Breeders' Cup Classic on dirt. However, the field had several horses such as Farma Way and Black Tie Affair who, like In Excess, were frontrunners, and trainer Bruce Jackson felt that the situation would make it very difficult for his horse to win, particularly at that distance. In addition, the race was to be held that year at Churchill Downs and In Excess put up slow times in pre-race training on that track. As a result, his trainer elected to run him in the Breeders' Cup Mile on grass, a surface he had won on in England and the United States. In Excess finished ninth in the Mile, his worst American finish ever, and it cost him the Horse of the Year title.

In Excess raced in 1992 at age five, with his best Graded stakes results a second in the San Antonio Handicap, and a third in both the Metropolitan and Carter Handicaps.

== Stud record ==
Retired to stud duty, going into 2009 In Excess has sired forty-nine Thoroughbred stakes winners and was the leading sire in California in 2002 and 2003. As of 2008, he was California's all-time sire of money-earners. Among his progeny were:

- Indian Charlie - won the 1998 Santa Anita Derby (G1); sire of Champions, Indian Blessing and Uncle Mo
- Musical Chimes - winner of the 2004 Oak Tree Mile Stakes (G1)
- Romance Is Diane - won the 2006 Hollywood Starlet Stakes (G1)
- Notional - won the 2007 San Rafael Stakes and Risen Star Stakes, 2008 Salvator Mile Handicap

In 2009, In Excess stood at Vessels Stallion Farm in Bonsall, California. In Excess was pensioned from stud duty in 2011 and died on May 17, 2013, at Vessels Stallion Farm.
