= 2022 Breeders' Cup Challenge series =

Series of horse races

The 2022 Breeders' Cup Challenge series was a series of horse races that provided the respective winners with an automatic "Win and You're In" berth in the 2022 Breeders' Cup, held on November 4 and 5. Races were chosen by the Breeders' Cup organization and included key races in the various Breeders' Cup divisions from around the world. The Breeders' Cup organization paid the Breeders' Cup entry fee for the challenge race winners, provided they had been nominated as foals. They also provided travel allowances for out of state competitors

== Summary ==
The 2022 Breeders' Cup Challenge series consisted of 82 races from across the United States and 10 other countries, compared to 84 races in the 2021 series. The Breeders' Cup committee restructured the series to ensure there were qualifying races in the east, midwest and west of the United States for most of the divisions, plus international qualifiers mainly for the turf races. The following races were added: Grande Prêmio Brasil (Turf - International region), Beverly D. (Filly & Mare Turf - Midwest), Green Flash (Turf Sprint - West region), Miss Grillo (Juvenile Fillies - East region), Ack Ack (Dirt Mile - Midwest region) and Pilgrim (Juvenile Turf - East). The Fleur de Lis, Suburban, John Nerud, Personal Ensign, Iroquois, Pocohantas, Jockey Club Derby, Santa Anita Sprint Championship, Zenyatta and First Lady were removed from the series. The King's Stand Stakes replaced the Diamond Jubilee Stakes as an international qualifier for the Turf Sprint.

NBC broadcast many of the North American challenge races, either on the main network or CNBC, with other races webcast on the Peacock.

Up to 14 horses are eligible for each Breeders' Cup race (12 for the Juvenile Turf Sprint and Dirt Mile). If a race is over-subscribed, first preference is given to winners of the Challenge series races. On October 26, 205 horses were pre-entered for the Breeders' Cup, 46 of which qualified via the Challenge series. The following fields were over-subscribed: Juvenile Turf Sprint, Juvenile Fillies, Juvenile Fillies Turf, Juvenile Turf, Filly & Mare Sprint, Turf Sprint, Dirt Mile, Filly & Mare Turf, Sprint, Mile and Turf.

Seven challenge race winners went on to win at the Breeders' Cup:

- Wonder Wheel automatically qualified in the Alcibiades, then won the Juvenile Fillies
- Forte won the Juvenile after qualifying in the Breeders' Futurity
- Goodnight Olive won the Filly & Mare Sprint after qualifying in the Ballerina Stakes
- Elite Power earned his automatic berth in the Vosburgh Stakes, then won the Sprint
- Modern Games won the Mile after automatically qualifying in the Woodbine Mile
- Malathaat won the Distaff after automatically qualifying in the Spinster Stakes
- Flightline automatically qualified by winning the Pacific Classic, then won the Classic. He also won the Metropolitan Handicap, which would have qualified him for the Dirt Mile

== Challenge Series races ==
The following table shows the Breeders' Cup Challenge races for 2022 and respective winners. The "status" column shows whether the Challenge race winner was entered at the Breeders' Cup, and if so if they finished in the money.

Month	Race	Track	Region	Division	Winner	Status
December	Gran Premio Internacional Carlos Pellegrini	San Isidro	International	Breeders' Cup Turf	Village King (ARG)	bypass
January	Paddock Stakes	Kenilworth	International	Breeders' Cup Filly & Mare Turf	Captain's Ransom (SAF)	bypass
January	Queen's Plate	Kenilworth	International	Breeders' Cup Mile	Jet Dark (SAF)	bypass
February	February Stakes	Tokyo	International	Breeders' Cup Classic	Cafe Pharaoh	bypass
May	Gran Premio Criadores Palermo	Argentino de Palermo	International	Breeders' Cup Distaff	La Validada (ARG)	bypass
May	Victoria Mile	Tokyo	International	Breeders' Cup Filly & Mare Turf	Sodashi (JPN)	bypass
May	Gran Premio Club Hipico Falabella	Santiago	International	Breeders' Cup Mile	Viejos Tiempos (CHI)	bypass
May	Shoemaker Mile	Santa Anita	West	Breeders' Cup Mile	Count Again	bypass
June	Yasuda Kinen	Tokyo	International	Breeders' Cup Mile	Danon Kingly (JPN)	bypass
June	Jaipur Stakes	Belmont Park	East	Breeders' Cup Turf Sprint	Casa Creed	entered
June	Ogden Phipps Stakes	Belmont Park	East	Breeders' Cup Distaff	Clairiere	third
June	Metropolitan Handicap	Belmont Park	East	Breeders' Cup Dirt Mile	Flightline	won Classic
June	Queen Anne Stakes	Royal Ascot	International	Breeders' Cup Mile	Baaeed (GB)	retired
June	Prince of Wales's Stakes	Royal Ascot	International	Breeders' Cup Turf	State of Rest (IRE)	retired
June	Norfolk Stakes	Royal Ascot	International	Breeders' Cup Juvenile Turf Sprint	The Ridler (GB)	bypass
June	King's Stand Stakes	Royal Ascot	International	Breeders' Cup Turf Sprint	Nature Strip (AUS)	bypass
June	Grande Prêmio Brasil	Gávea	International	Breeders' Cup Turf	Nautilus (BRZ)	entered
June	Takarazuka Kinen	Hanshin	International	Breeders' Cup Turf	Titleholder (JPN)	bypass
June	Gran Premio Pamplona	Monterrico	International	Breeders' Cup Filly & Mare Turf	Ola Perfecta (PER)	bypass
June	Stephen Foster Handicap	Churchill Downs	Midwest	Breeders' Cup Classic	Olympiad	second
July	Princess Rooney	Gulfstream Park	East	Breeders' Cup Filly & Mare Sprint	Ce Ce	fourth
July	Haskell Stakes	Monmouth	East	Breeders' Cup Classic	Cyberknife	second in Dirt Mile
July	King George VI and Queen Elizabeth Stakes	Ascot	International	Breeders' Cup Turf	Pyledriver (GB)	recovering from injury
July	Sussex Stakes	Goodwood	International	Breeders' Cup Mile	Baaeed	retired
July	Bing Crosby Handicap	Del Mar	West	Breeders' Cup Sprint	American Theorem	entered
August	Clement L. Hirsch Stakes	Del Mar	West	Breeders' Cup Distaff	Blue Stripe (ARG)	second
August	Whitney Handicap	Saratoga	East	Breeders' Cup Classic	Life Is Good	entered
August	Fourstardave Handicap	Saratoga	East	Breeders' Cup Mile	Casa Creed	entered in Sprint
August	Beverly D. Stakes	Churchill Downs	East	Breeders' Cup Filly & Mare Turf	Dalika (GER)	bypass
August	Prix Jacques Le Marois	Deauville	International	Breeders' Cup Mile	Inspiral (GB)	bypass
August	Juddmonte International	York	International	Breeders' Cup Classic	Baaeed (GB)	retired
August	Yorkshire Oaks	York	International	Breeders' Cup Filly & Mare Turf	Alpinista	bypass
August	Nunthorpe Stakes	York	International	Breeders' Cup Turf Sprint	Highfield Princess (FR)	fourth
August	Prix Morny	Deauville	International	Breeders' Cup Juvenile Turf Sprint	Blackbeard (IRE)	Retired
August	Sword Dancer	Saratoga	East	Breeders' Cup Turf	Gufo	bypass
August	Pat O'Brien Handicap	Del Mar	West	Breeders' Cup Dirt Mile	Laurel River	scratched
August	Ballerina Stakes	Saratoga	East	Breeders' Cup Filly & Mare Sprint	Goodnight Olive	won
September	Jockey Club Gold Cup	Saratoga	East	Breeders' Cup Classic	Olympiad	second
August	Pacific Classic	Del Mar	West	Breeders' Cup Classic	Flightline	won
August	Del Mar Handicap	Del Mar	West	Breeders' Cup Turf	Gold Phoenix (IRE)	entered
September	Flower Bowl	Saratoga	East	Breeders' Cup Filly & Mare Turf	Virginia Joy (GER)	entered
September	Green Flash Handicap	Del Mar	West	Breeders' Cup Turf Sprint	Lieutenant Dan	bypass
September	Irish Champion Stakes	Leopardstown	International	Breeders' Cup Turf	Luxembourg (IRE)	bypass
September	Juvenile Stakes	Leopardstown	International	Breeders' Cup Juvenile Turf	Auguste Rodin (IRE)	bypass
September	Matron Stakes	Leopardstown	International	Breeders' Cup Filly & Mare Turf	Pearls Galore (FR)	bypass
September	Kentucky Turf Cup	Kentucky Downs	Midwest	Breeders' Cup Turf	Red Knight	entered
September	Kentucky Downs Turf Sprint Stakes	Kentucky Downs	Midwest	Breeders' Cup Turf Sprint	Bran (FR)	scratched
September	Moyglare Stud Stakes	Curragh	International	Breeders' Cup Juvenile Fillies Turf	Tahiyra (IRE)	bypass
September	Flying Five Stakes	Curragh	International	Breeders' Cup Turf Sprint	Highfield Princess (FR)	fourth
September	Woodbine Mile	Woodbine	International	Breeders' Cup Mile	Modern Games (IRE)	won
September	Natalma Stakes	Woodbine	International	Breeders' Cup Juvenile Fillies Turf	Last Call	entered
September	Summer Stakes	Woodbine	International	Breeders' Cup Juvenile Turf	Mysterious Night (IRE)	bypass
September	Rockfel Stakes	Newmarket	International	Breeders' Cup Juvenile Fillies Turf	Commissioning (GB)	bypass
September	Royal Lodge Stakes	Newmarket	International	Breeders' Cup Juvenile Turf	The Foxes (IRE)	bypass
October	Champagne Stakes	Aqueduct (Note: While Belmont Park was closed for renovations, its fall 2022 meeting was run at Aqueduct)	East	Breeders' Cup Juvenile	Blazing Sevens	fourth
October	Miss Grillo Stakes	Aqueduct	East	Breeders' Cup Juvenile Fillies Turf	Pleasant Passage	second
October	Awesome Again Stakes	Santa Anita	West	Breeders' Cup Classic	Defunded	bypass
October	Ack Ack Stakes	Churchill Downs	Midwest	Breeders' Cup Dirt Mile	Senor Buscador	entered
October	Prix Jean-Luc Lagardère	Longchamp	International	Breeders' Cup Juvenile Turf	Belbek (FR)	bypass
October	Prix Marcel Boussac	Longchamp	International	Breeders' Cup Juvenile Fillies Turf	Blue Rose Cen (IRE)	bypass
October	Prix de l'Abbaye de Longchamp	Longchamp	International	Breeders' Cup Turf Sprint	The Platinum Queen (IRE)	entered in Juvenile Turf Sprint (Note: The Platinum Queen is a two-year old, so is ineligible for the Turf Sprint for three-year olds and up.)
October	Prix de l'Opéra	Longchamp	International	Breeders' Cup Filly & Mare Turf	Place du Carrousel (IRE)	bypass
October	Prix de l'Arc de Triomphe	Longchamp	International	Breeders' Cup Turf	Alpinista (GB)	bypass
October	Pilgrim Stakes	Aqueduct	East	Breeders' Cup Juvenile Turf	Major Dude	entered
October	Frizette Stakes	Aqueduct	East	Breeders' Cup Juvenile Fillies	Chocolate Gelato	entered
October	Speakeasy Stakes	Santa Anita	West	Breeders' Cup Juvenile Turf Sprint	Speed Boat Beach	entered
October	Jessamine Stakes	Keeneland	Midwest	Breeders' Cup Juvenile Fillies Turf	Delight	entered
October	Alcibiades Stakes	Keeneland	Midwest	Breeders' Cup Juvenile Fillies	Wonder Wheel	won
October	Phoenix Stakes	Keeneland	Midwest	Breeders' Cup Sprint	Manny Wah	fourth
October	Vosburgh Stakes	Aqueduct	East	Breeders' Cup Sprint	Elite Power	won
October	American Pharoah Stakes	Santa Anita	West	Breeders' Cup Juvenile	Cave Rock	second
October	Chandelier Stakes	Santa Anita	West	Breeders' Cup Juvenile Fillies	And Tell Me Nolies	entered
October	Rodeo Drive Stakes	Santa Anita	West	Breeders' Cup Filly & Mare Turf	Going to Vegas	entered
October	Breeders' Futurity Stakes	Keeneland	Midwest	Breeders' Cup Juvenile	Forte	won
October	Coolmore Turf Mile Stakes	Keeneland	Midwest	Breeders' Cup Mile	Annapolis	entered
October	Thoroughbred Club of America Stakes	Keeneland	Midwest	Breeders' Cup Filly & Mare Sprint	Slammed	entered
October	Indian Summer Stakes	Keeneland	Midwest	Breeders' Cup Juvenile Turf Sprint	Private Creed	third
October	Bourbon Stakes	Keeneland	Midwest	Breeders' Cup Juvenile Turf	Andthewinneris	entered
October	Spinster Stakes	Keeneland	Midwest	Breeders' Cup Distaff	Malathaat	won
October	Belmont Futurity	Aqueduct	East	Breeders' Cup Juvenile Turf Sprint	Nagirroc	entered in Juvenile Turf
October	Champion Stakes	Ascot	International	Breeders' Cup Turf	Bay Bridge	bypass
October	Queen Elizabeth II Stakes	Ascot	International	Breeders' Cup Mile	Bayside Boy	bypass
