= 2022 Breeders' Cup =

Thoroughbred horse racing event

- Class: Championship Event Series
- Location: Keeneland, Lexington, Kentucky
- Race type: Thoroughbred
- Website: www.breederscup.com

Race information
- Distance: See individual races
- Surface: Turf, Dirt
- Purse: Varies by Race; from $1 million to $6 million

The 2022 Breeders' Cup World Championships was the 39th edition of the premier event of the North American Thoroughbred horse racing year. The 14 races, all of which were Grade I, took place on November 4 and 5 at Keeneland racetrack in Lexington, Kentucky. In the United States, the races were telecast on Friday and early Saturday by USA Network and FanDuel TV, with NBC covering the last three races on Saturday. In the United Kingdom, ITV broadcast all the races live, with day 1 on ITV3 and day 2 on ITV4.

The Breeders' Cup is generally regarded as the end of the North American racing season, although a few Grade I events take place in later November and December. The event typically determines champions in many of the Eclipse Award divisions.

== Qualifying ==
A maximum of 14 horses (12 in the Dirt Mile and Juvenile Turf Sprint) were allowed to start in each race. Horses could automatically qualify by winning one of the designated races in the Breeders' Cup Challenge series, which provide "Win and You're In" berths in a specified division of the Breeders' Cup. Other pre-entries were ranked by a points system and the judgement of a panel of experts.

On October 26, 205 horses were pre-entered in the various races, 46 of which qualified via the Challenge series. The entries include 73 Grade/Group 1 winners and 45 horses from overseas. Most of the races had full fields. However, two of the most highly anticipated events (the Classic and Distaff) had smaller fields that included most of the top-ranked horses in the United States, including Flightline, Life Is Good and Epicenter in the Classic, and Nest and Malathaat in the Distaff.

== Event preparation ==
Keeneland hosted the Breeders' Cup for the third time. They first hosted the event in 2015 when American Pharoah finished his career by winning the Classic after having won the American Triple Crown. The 2020 event at Keeneland though was held without spectators due to the COVID-19 pandemic in the United States. Fans who had purchased tickets for that event were given first preference for seating at the 2022 event. Keeneland installed temporary seating, including five "chalets" and loge boxes, to increase their normal capacity of about 20,000 to 45,000 people.

== Races ==
The official sequence of the Breeders' Cup races was announced on October 26. The betting menu included an All-Turf Pick 3 on Friday, an All-Turf Pick 4 on Saturday and three special "daily doubles" where a bettor needed to pick the winner of one race on Friday and the corresponding race on Saturday for older horses: Juvenile Fillies/Distaff, Juvenile/Classic and Juvenile Turf/Turf.

=== Friday, November 4 ===
Two horses, Forte and the filly Wonder Wheel, likely wrapped up Eclipse Awards by winning the Juvenile and Juvenile Fillies respectively. Forte, who had previously won the Hopeful Stakes and Breeders' Futurity, beat the heavily favored Cave Rock with a come-from-behind stretch drive. Similarly, Wonder Wheel was well back in the early run but closed well to win by three lengths – the largest winning margin in the day's Breeders' Cup races.

All three turf races were won by Irish-bred horses. Trainer Aidan O'Brien won two races for Coolmore – the Juvenile Fillies Turf with Meditate and the Juvenile Turf with Victoria Road – and trainer Charlie Appleby won the Juvenile Turf Sprint with Mischief Magic for Godolphin.

A record $49.27 million was bet on the five Breeders' Cup races, a 16.4% increase over the record set in 2021 for Friday betting. Only one favorite won on the day but there were no major upsets. Nonetheless, the Pick 5 returned $2,428.02 for a 50 cent bet.

| Race name | Post time (EST) | Sponsor | Distance | Restrictions | Purse | Winner (Bred) | Odds (Note: Kentucky introduced "penny breakage" in July 2022, meaning the pari-mutuel returns are rounded to the nearest penny for each dollar bet. Previously, returns were rounded down to the nearest dime.) | Margin |
|---|---|---|---|---|---|---|---|---|
| Juvenile Turf Sprint | 3:00 PM | | 5 1/2 furlongs | 2-year-olds | $1 million | Mischief Magic (IRE) | 6.92 | 1 length |
| Juvenile Fillies | 3:40 PM | NetJets | 1 1/16 miles | 2-year-old fillies | $2 million | Wonder Wheel (KY) | 6.50 | 3 lengths |
| Juvenile Fillies Turf | 4:20 PM | | 1 mile | 2-year-old fillies | $1 million | Meditate (IRE) | 2.04* | 2 1/2 lengths |
| Juvenile | 5:00 PM | FanDuel | 1 1/16 miles | 2-year-old colts and geldings | $2 million | Forte (KY) | 5.02 | 1 1/2 lengths |
| Juvenile Turf | 5:40 PM | | 1 mile | 2-year-old colts and geldings | $1 million | Victoria Road (IRE) | 5.57 | Nose |

An asterisk after the odds means the winner was the post-time favorite

Source: Equibase charts for Friday, November 4

Legend:
Dirt Turf

=== Saturday, November 5 ===
In winning the Classic by a record 8 1/4 lengths, Flightline all but guaranteed he would earn American Horse of the Year honors, as well as the older male horse title. Malathaat also wrapped up the Eclipse Award for older fillies and mares by winning the Distaff in a three-way photo finish with Blue Stripe and Clairiere, while Goodnight Olive is likely to be named the female sprint Champion after her win in the Filly & Mare Sprint. However, the male sprint Champion title is undecided after heavy favorite Jackie's Warrior was beaten by Elite Power in the Sprint. Cody's Wish may also be considered for the title after his win in the Dirt Mile.

In the Turf races, European-bred horses were once again dominant, though Pennsylvania-bred Caravel did manage to win the Turf Sprint in the day's biggest upset. Aidan O'Brien and Coolmore won the Filly & Mare Turf with Tuesday, while Charlie Appleby and Godolphin won the Mile and Turf with Modern Games and Rebel's Romance respectively. O'Brien and Appleby tied as the leading trainers over the two-day card with three wins each. Ryan Moore won the Shoemaker Award, having ridden Coolmore's three winners over the weekend, plus three seconds (Stone Age in the Turf, Emaraaty Ana in the Turf Sprint and Dramatised in the Juvenile Turf Sprint).

The all-sources handle was a record $189 million over the two days, up 3.4% over the previous record set in 2021.

| Race name | Post time (EST) | Sponsor | Distance | Restrictions | Purse | Winner (Bred) | Odds | Margin |
|---|---|---|---|---|---|---|---|---|
| Filly & Mare Sprint | 11:50 AM | | 7 furlongs | 3 yrs+ fillies & mares | $1 million | Goodnight Olive (KY) | 1.85* | 2 1/2 lengths |
| Turf Sprint | 12:29 PM | | 5 1/2 furlongs | 3 yrs+ | $1 million | Caravel (PA) | 42.89 | 1/2 length |
| Dirt Mile | 1:10 PM | Big Ass Fans | 1 mile | 3 yrs+ | $2 million | Cody's Wish (KY) | 2.16* | Head |
| Filly & Mare Turf | 1:50 PM | Maker's Mark | 1 3/16 miles | 3 yrs+ fillies & mares | $2 million | Tuesday (IRE) | 4.19 | 1 length |
| Sprint | 2:30 PM | Qatar Racing | 6 furlongs | 3 yrs+ | $2 million | Elite Power (KY) | 5.55 | 1 1/4 lengths |
| Mile | 3:10 PM | FanDuel | 1 mile | 3 yrs+ | $2 million | Modern Games (IRE) | 1.38* | 3/4 length |
| Distaff | 3:55 PM | Longines | 1 1/8 miles | 3 yrs+ fillies & mares | $2 million | Malathaat (KY) | 2.88 | Nose |
| Turf | 4:40 PM | Longines | 1 1/2 miles | 3 yrs+ | $4 million | Rebel's Romance (IRE) | 5.96 | 2 1/4 lengths |
| Classic | 5:40 PM | Longines | 1 1/4 miles | 3 yrs+ | $6 million | Flightline (KY) | 0.44* | 8 1/4 lengths |

An asterisk after the odds means the winner was the post-time favorite

Source: Equibase charts for Saturday, November 5

Legend:
Dirt Turf
