= 2022 World's Best Racehorse Rankings =

The 2022 World's Best Racehorse Rankings, sponsored by Longines was the 2022 edition of the World's Best Racehorse Rankings. It was an assessment of Thoroughbred racehorses issued by the International Federation of Horseracing Authorities (IFHA) on 25 January 2022. It included horses aged three or older which competed in flat races during 2022. It was open to all horses irrespective of where they raced or where they were trained.

== Rankings for 2022 ==
- For a detailed guide to this table, see below.

Rank	Rating	Horse	Age	Sex	Trained	Surface	Cat.
1	140	Flightline (USA)	4	C	USA	Dirt	I
2	135	Baaeed (GB)	4	C	GB	Turf	I
3	126	Equinox (JPN)	3	C	JPN	Turf	L
3	126	Nature Strip (AUS)	8	G	AUS	Turf	S
5	125	Epicenter (USA)	3	C	USA	Dirt	I
5	125	Life Is Good (USA)	4	C	USA	Dirt	M
5	125	Vadeni (FR)	3	C	FR	Turf	L
8	124	Golden Sixty (AUS)	7	G	HK	Turf	M
8	124	Kyprios (IRE)	4	G	IRE	Turf	E
8	124	Olympiad (USA)	4	C	USA	Dirt	I
8	124	Pyledriver (GB)	5	H	GB	Turf	L
8	124	Real World (IRE)	5	H	GB	Turf	M
8	124	Romantic Warrior (IRE)	4	G	HK	Turf	I
8	124	Titleholder (JPN)	4	C	JPN	Turf	L
8	124	Torquator Tasso (GER)	5	H	GER	Turf	L
16	123	Alpinista (GB)	5	M	GB	Turf	L
16	123	California Spangle (IRE)	4	G	HK	Turf	M
16	123	Desert Crown (GB)	3	C	GB	Turf	L
16	123	Luxembourg (IRE)	3	C	USA	Turf	I
16	123	Taiba (USA)	3	C	USA	Dirt	M, I
16	123	Vela Azul (JPN)	5	H	JPN	Turf	L
22	122	Bay Bridge (GB)	4	C	GB	Turf	I
22	122	Hukum (IRE)	5	H	GB	Turf	L
22	122	Onesto (IRE)	3	C	FR	Turf	I
22	122	Rebel's Romance (IRE)	4	G	GB	Turf	T
22	122	Serifos (JPN)	3	C	JPN	Turf	M
22	122	Speakers Corner (USA)	4	C	USA	Dirt	S, M
22	122	State Of Rest (IRE)	4	C	IRE	Turf	I
29	121	Adayar (IRE)	4	C	GB	Turf	I
29	121	Al Hakeem (GB)	3	C	FR	Turf	L
29	121	Anamoe (AUS)	4	C	AUS	Turf	I
29	121	Coroebus (IRE)	3	C	GB	Turf	M
29	121	Country Grammer (USA)	5	H	USA	Dirt	I
29	121	Golden Pal (USA)	4	C	USA	Turf	S
29	121	Hot Rod Charlie (USA)	4	C	USA	Dirt	M
29	121	Jack Christopher (USA)	3	C	USA	Dirt	S
29	121	Jackie's Warrior (USA)	4	C	USA	Dirt	S
29	121	Minzaal (IRE)	4	C	GB	Turf	S
29	121	Modern Games (IRE)	3	C	GB	Turf	M
29	121	My Prospero (IRE)	3	C	GB	Turf	I
29	121	Shahryar (JPN)	4	C	JPN	Turf	L
29	121	Trueshan (FR)	6	G	GB	Artificial	E
29	121	Wellington (AUS)	6	G	HK	Turf	S
44	120	Boldog Hos (JPN)	3	C	JPN	Turf	L
44	120	Do Deuce (JPN)	3	C	JPN	Turf	L
44	120	Dreamloper (IRE)	5	M	GB	Turf	M
44	120	El Bodegon (IRE)	3	C	AUS	Turf	I
44	120	Emblem Road (USA)	4	C	KSA	Dirt	M
44	120	Giga Kick (AUS)	3	G	AUS	Turf	S
44	120	Hishi Iguazu (JPN)	6	H	JPN	Turf	L
44	120	Home Affairs (AUS)	4	C	AUS	Turf	S
44	120	I'm Thunderstruck (NZ)	5	G	GB	Turf	M, I
44	120	Inspiral (GB)	3	F	GB	Turf	M
44	120	Light Infantry (FR)	3	C	GB	Turf	M
44	120	Mishriff (IRE)	5	H	GB	Turf	I
44	120	Mo Donegal (USA)	3	C	USA	Dirt	L
44	120	Panthalassa (JPN)	5	H	JPN	Turf	I
44	120	Private Eye (AUS)	5	G	AUS	Turf	S
44	120	Rich Strike (USA)	3	C	USA	Dirt	M, I
44	120	Think It Over (AUS)	7	G	AUS	Turf	I
44	120	Tunnes (GER)	3	C	GER	Turf	L
44	120	Weltreisende (JPN)	5	H	JPN	Turf	L
44	120	Westover (GB)	3	C	GB	Turf	L
44	120	Zaaki (GB)	7	G	AUS	Turf	M, I

== Guide ==
A complete guide to the main table above.

Rank
A horse's position in the list, with the most highly rated at number 1. Each horse is ranked once according to its highest rating. Any lesser ratings for the same horse are not ranked.

Rating
A rating represents a weight value in pounds, with higher values given to horses which showed greater ability. It is judged that these weights would equalise the abilities of the horses if carried in a theoretical handicap race. The minimum rating required for inclusion is 115.

Horse
Each horse's name is followed by a suffix (from the IFHA's International Code of Suffixes) which indicates the country foaled.

Age
The age of the horse at the time it achieved its rating. The racing ages of all horses foaled in a particular part of the world increase simultaneously, regardless of the actual date of foaling.
Dates of age increase by location foaled
Northern Hemisphere	1 January
South America	1 July
Australia, New Zealand and South Africa	1 August

Sex
C	Colt	Ungelded male horse up to four-years-old
F	Filly	Female horse up to four-years-old
H	Horse	Ungelded male horse over four-years-old
M	Mare	Female horse over four-years-old
G	Gelding	Gelded male horse of any age

Trained
The country where the horse was trained at the time of the rating, abbreviated using the International Code of Suffixes.

Position
The horse's finishing position in the race shown. The actual finishing order can sometimes be amended following an inquiry or a disqualification.
=	Dead-heat
↑	Promoted from original finishing position
↓	Relegated from original finishing position

Race
The race (or one of the races) for which the horse achieved its rating. A defeated horse can be rated above its higher-placed opponents if it carried more weight.

Surface
The surface of the track on which the race was run, eg. turf or dirt. Synthetic surfaces are described as "artificial".

Distance
The distance of the race in metres. In some countries (eg. Canada, Great Britain, Ireland and the United States), the length of a race is usually expressed in miles and furlongs. These units have been converted to metres to allow for universal comparison.
Common conversions
5 furlongs	= 1,006 m	1 mile and 1½ furlongs	= 1,911 m
6 furlongs	= 1,207 m	1 mile and 2 furlongs	= 2,012 m
6½ furlongs	= 1,308 m	1 mile and 2½ furlongs	= 2,112 m
7 furlongs	= 1,408 m	1 mile and 3 furlongs	= 2,213 m
7½ furlongs	= 1,509 m	1 mile and 4 furlongs	= 2,414 m
1 mile	= 1,609 m	1 mile and 6 furlongs	= 2,816 m
1 mile and ½ furlong	= 1,710 m	2 miles	= 3,219 m
1 mile and 1 furlong	= 1,811 m	2 miles and 4 furlongs	= 4,023 m

Category
		Metres	Furlongs
S	Sprint	1,000–1,300; 1,000–1,599 (CAN / USA)	5–6.5; 5–7.99 (CAN / USA)
M	Mile	1,301–1,899; 1,600–1,899 (CAN / USA)	6.51–9.49; 8–9.49 (CAN / USA)
I	Intermediate	1,900–2,100	9.5–10.5
L	Long	2,101–2,700	10.51–13.5
E	Extended	2,701+	13.51+

International Code of Suffixes
The following countries have been represented in the WTR as foaling or training locations since the first edition in 2004.
ARG	Argentina	ITY	Italy
AUS	Australia	JPN	Japan
BRZ	Brazil	KSA	Saudi Arabia
CAN	Canada	NZ	New Zealand
CHI	Chile	SAF	South Africa
CZE	Czech Republic	SIN	Singapore
FR	France	SPA	Spain
GB	Great Britain	TUR	Turkey
GER	Germany	UAE	United Arab Emirates
HK	Hong Kong	USA	United States
HUN	Hungary	VEN	Venezuela
IRE	Ireland	ZIM	Zimbabwe

Shading
The shaded areas represent lesser ratings recorded by horses which were more highly rated in a different category. The IFHA publishes this information when the lower rating is the overall top performance in a particular category.
