= 2022 Breeders' Cup Classic =

Thoroughbred horse race

39th Breeders' Cup Classic
- Breeders' Cup Classic
- Location: Keeneland
- Date: November 5, 2022
- Winning horse: Flightline
- Winning time: 2:00.05
- Final odds: 0.44
- Jockey: Flavien Prat
- Trainer: John W. Sadler
- Owner: Horris Racing, Siena Farm, Summer Wind Equine, West Point Thoroughbreds and Woodford Racing
- Conditions: Fast
- Surface: Dirt
- Attendance: 45,973

The 2022 Breeders' Cup Classic was the 39th running of the Breeders' Cup Classic, part of the 2022 Breeders' Cup World Thoroughbred Championships program, and the fourth race in the so-called Grand Slam of Thoroughbred racing in North America. It was run on November 5, 2022, at Keeneland Racetrack in Lexington, Kentucky. It featured the top-ranked older horses in the United States, Flightline, Life Is Good and Olympiad, and the leading three-year-olds, Epicenter and Taiba. Flightline, the odds-on favorite, won the race by 8 1/4 lengths, and was later named the American Horse of the Year.

The Classic is run on dirt at one mile and one-quarter (approximately 2000 m). The purse of $6,000,000 was the highest in North America in 2022. The race is run under weight-for-age conditions, with entrants carrying the following weights:

- Northern Hemisphere three-year-olds: 122 lb
- Southern Hemisphere three-year-olds: 117 lb
- Four-year-olds and up: 126 lb
- Any fillies or mares receive a 3 lb allowance

The race was broadcast on NBC.

== Contenders ==
The Breeders' Cup Classic is open to up to 14 starters, with automatic berths for horses that win one of the designated "Win and You're In" races in the 2022 Breeders' Cup Challenge series. Other horses are ranked by their performances in graded stakes races and by the judgement of a panel of racing experts.

Entries were taken on October 31 after which the post position draw was held. All eight entrants had won a Grade I race at some point in their career, and six were coming off wins in their previous start. The leading contenders include:

- Flightline, the top-ranked horse in the world, according to the World's Best Racehorse Rankings. Undefeated in five starts including the Metropolitan Handicap and Pacific Classic.
- Life Is Good, ranked number two in the NTRA poll of North American racehorses in training. Winner of the Pegasus World Cup, Whitney and Woodward Stakes in 2022, and the Breeders' Cup Dirt Mile in 2021.
- Epicenter, the top-ranked three-year-old in the NTRA poll. Winner of the Travers Stakes in his last start.
- Olympiad, winner of the Jockey Club Gold Cup
- Taiba, winner of the Pennsylvania Derby

== Race description ==
The two favorites, Flightline and Life Is Good, both had front-running styles and the concern before the race was that they would tire each other out in an early speed duel, opening the door to late closers. As expected, Life Is Good went to the early lead with Flightline a half-length behind after an opening quarter mile in a brisk 22.55 seconds. Around the first turn, Life Is Good widened the lead to two lengths, completing the half mile in very fast :45.47. He maintained the lead down the backstretch as the two front-runners opened a thirteen length lead after three-quarters of a mile in 1:09.62. Going into the final turn, Flightline began to make up ground, then took the lead after a mile in 1:34.58. (For contrast, the Dirt Mile run earlier that day was run in 1:35.33). At the top of the stretch, Flightline quickly drew away from Life Is Good, then continued to open the lead to win by 8 1/4 lengths over Olympiad and Taiba. Life Is Good tired and eventually finished fifth.

Flightline was the shortest-price winner in the history of the race and his winning margin of 8 1/4 lengths was the longest. "That's a pretty special horse," said Bill Mott, who trained the runner-up Olympiad. "He chased down a fast horse and then kept going and drew off. You just don’t see that."

"The plan was to make Flightline earn it," said Elliott Walden of WinStar Farm, which co-owns Life Is Good. "They are both great horses but the fractions took a toll on him... We have no regrets. We tried the mile and a quarter and we competed. That's what we were here to do."

Epicenter was pulled up on the backstretch after suffering a fracture in the condyloid joint of his right foreleg. He underwent surgery at Rood & Riddle Equine Hospital and was expected to recover to recover fully for stud duties.

== Results ==
Finish	Program Number	Horse	Jockey	Trainer	Morning Line Odds	Final Odds	Winnings	Margin
1	4	Flightline	Flavien Prat	John W. Sadler	3-5	0.44*	$3,120,000	
2	7	Olympiad	Junior Alvarado	William I. Mott	10-1	26.88	$1,020,000	8 1/4 lengths
3	1	Taiba	Mike E. Smith	Bob Baffert	8-1	8.26	$540,000	8 3/4 lengths
4	8	Rich Strike	Sonny Leon	Eric Reed	20-1	24.61	$300,000	11 1/4 lengths
5	2	Life Is Good	Irad Ortiz Jr	Todd Pletcher	6-1	8.81	$180,000	12 1/2 lengths
6	5	Hot Rod Charlie	Tyler Gaffalione	Doug O'Neill	15-1	16.98	$120,000	15 lengths
7	3	Happy Saver	John Velazquez	Todd Pletcher	30-1	49.21	$60,000	18 1/2 lengths
DNF	6	Epicenter	Joel Rosario	Steve Asmussen	5-1	6.14		DNF

Times: 1/4 – 22.55; 1/2 – 45.47; 3/4 – 1:09.27; (Note: This fraction was amended after an outrider tripped the timing beam early as he was making his way to tend to Epicenter.) mile – 1:34.58; final – 2:00.05
Splits for each quarter-mile: (22.55) (22.92) (23.80) (25.31) (25.47)

== Payout ==
Payout Schedule:

Program Number	Horse	Win	Place	Show
4	Flightline	$2.88	$2.92	$2.30
7	Olympiad		$12.38	$7.16
1	Taiba			$4.00

- $1 Exacta (4-7) Paid $17.87
- $0.50 Trifecta (4-7-1) Paid $41.63
- $0.10 Superfecta (4-7-1-8) Paid $69.16
