= John A. Nerud Stakes =

- Class: Grade III
- Location: Belmont Park; Elmont, New York, United States
- Inaugurated: 2008 (at Saratoga Race Course as James Marvin Stakes)
- Race type: Thoroughbred – Flat racing
- Website: NYRA

Race information
- Distance: 6 furlongs
- Surface: Dirt
- Track: Left-handed
- Qualification: Four-years-old and older
- Weight: 124 lbs. with allowances
- Purse: $175,000 (2025)
- Bonuses: Winner automatic entry into Breeders' Cup Sprint

The John A. Nerud Stakes is a Grade III American Thoroughbred horse race for four years old or older at a distance of seven furlongs on the dirt run annually in May at Belmont Park in Elmont, New York. The event currently offers a purse of $175,000.

== History ==
The race was inaugurated on 9 August 2008 as the James Marvin Stakes at Saratoga Race Course over a distance of six furlongs. The event was named after James Marvin, a noted hotel owner and politician in Saratoga Springs in the 19th century. Marvin was one of the first members of the Saratoga Association that founded Saratoga Race Course in 1863. He later became a director of the Association and was its president from 1877 to 1891.

The following year the event was run over a longer distance of seven furlongs. In 2012, the race was classified as a Grade III event. In 2014, the race was moved to Belmont and became part of the Stars and Stripes Festival and was renamed to the Belmont Sprint Championship Stakes.

Clearly Now set a track record at Belmont Park when winning the 2014 renewal in 1:19.96.

In 2017, the race was upgraded to Grade II status by the Thoroughbred Owners and Breeders Association and became part of the Breeders' Cup Challenge "Win and You're In" series – the winner will receive an automatic berth in the Breeders' Cup Sprint.

In 2019 the race was renamed to the John A. Nerud Stakes in honor of the late John Nerud, a prominent thoroughbred owner and trainer who was inducted into the Hall of Fame in 1972.

In 2020 due to the COVID-19 pandemic in the United States, NYRA did not schedule the event in their updated and shortened spring-summer meeting.

In 2024 the event was moved to Aqueduct Racetrack due to infield tunnel and redevelopment work at Belmont Park.

In 2025 the event was downgraded by the Thoroughbred Owners and Breeders Association to Grade III status and moved in the racing calendar schedule to May.

== Records ==
Speed record:

- 7 furlongs – 1:19.96 Clearly Now (2014)

Margins:

- 6 1/4 lengths – Clearly Now (2014)

Most wins by a jockey:

- 2 – Cornelio Velásquez: (2009, 2013)
- 2 – Joel Rosario: (2012, 2017)
- 2 – Flavien Prat: (2022, 2024)

Most wins by a trainer:

- 2 – Todd Pletcher: (2021, 2022)

Most wins by an owner:

- 2 – WinStar Farm: (2022, 2024)

== Winners ==
Year	Winner	Age	Jockey	Trainer	Owner	Distance	Time	Purse	Grade	Ref
At Aqueduct - John A. Nerud Stakes
2026	Durante	7	Ricardo Santana Jr.	David Jacobson	David Jacobson	6 furlongs	1:10.45	$175,000	III	
2025	Whatchatalkcinabout	4	Irad Ortiz Jr.	Wesley A. Ward	Ice Wine Stable	6 furlongs	1:09.03	$169,750	III	
2024	Mullikin	4	Flavien Prat	Rodolphe Brisset	Siena Farm & WinStar Farm	7 furlongs	1:20.54	$194,000	II	
At Belmont Park
2023	Three Technique	6	Javier Castellano	Jason Cook	David E. Miller, Eric Grindley & John Werner	7 furlongs	1:21.88	$250,000	II	
2022	Life Is Good	4	Flavien Prat	Todd Pletcher	WinStar Farm & China Horse Club	7 furlongs	1:21.70	$232,500	II	
2021	Mind Control	5	John Velazquez	Todd Pletcher	Red Oak Stable & Madaket Stables	7 furlongs	1:21.94	$250,000	II	
2020	Race not held									
2019	Promises Fulfilled	4	Luis Saez	Dale L. Romans	Robert J. Baron	7 furlongs	1:21.75	$300,000	II	
Belmont Sprint Championship Stakes
2018	Limousine Liberal	6	Jose L. Ortiz	Ben Colebrook	Katherine G. Ball	7 furlongs	1:21.53	$343,000	II	
2017	Mind Your Biscuits	4	Joel Rosario	Chad Summers	J Stables, Head of Plains Partners, M. Scott, Daniel, Chad Summers, & Michael E. Kisber	7 furlongs	1:21.84	$350,000	II	
2016	A. P. Indian	6	Joe Bravo	Arnaud Delacour	Green Lantern Stables	7 furlongs	1:21.41	$400,000	III	
2015	Private Zone (CAN)	6	Martin A. Pedroza	Jorge Navarro	Good Friends Stable	7 furlongs	1:22.57	$384,000	III	
2014	Clearly Now	4	Jose Lezcano	Brian A. Lynch	Up Hill Stable	7 furlongs	1:19.96	$400,000	III	
At Saratoga – James Marvin Stakes
2013	Sage Valley	4	Cornelio Velasquez	Rudy R. Rodriguez	Michael Dubb & Gary Aisquith	7 furlongs	1:22.49	$100,000	III	
2012	Pacific Ocean	5	Joel Rosario	Richard E. Dutrow Jr.	Dennis Narlinger	7 furlongs	1:22.53	$100,000	III	
2011	Jackson Bend	4	Corey Nakatani	Nicholas P. Zito	Robert LaPenta & Fred Brei	7 furlongs	1:20.91	$78,000	Listed	
2010	Vineyard Haven	4	Alan Garcia	Saeed bin Suroor	Godolphin Racing	7 furlongs	1:22.30	$75,000	Listed	
2009	Gold Trippi	5	Cornelio Velasquez	Stanley M. Hough	E. Paul Robsham Stables	7 furlongs	1:22.30	$73,950		
2008	Eternal Star	4	Ramon A. Dominguez	Michael J. Trombetta	Harry C. & Tom O. Meyerhoff	6 furlongs	1:08.79	$102,500	Listed	

== See also ==
- List of American and Canadian Graded races
