= Lenny Goodman =

American jockeys' agent

- Born: c.1920
- Died: September 24, 1996 (aged 76); Rockville Centre, New York, United States
- Occupation: jockey's agent
- Known for: coach, tutor and surrogate father for the teen-aged jockey Steve Cauthen
- Awards: Jockey Agent's Hall of Fame

Lenny Goodman (died September 24, 1996, in Rockville Centre, New York) was a jockey's agent notable for having "served as coach, tutor and surrogate father for the teen-aged jockey Steve Cauthen". He has been described as the "William Morris of jockey agents" and a "nonpareil agent".

Goodman was inducted into The Jockey Agent's Hall of Fame.

Goodman was also the agent for Wesley A. Ward, John Rotz, Bobby Ussery, Bill Hartack, Braulio Baeza and Robbie Davis. Baeza referred to him as “"Double-07' because Goodman is an astute handicapper who rarely puts the jockey on the wrong horse. "I owe a lot to him," Braulio said.”

During World War II, he was a welder in the Brooklyn Navy Yard.

A resident of Woodmere, New York, Goodman died at the age of 76 after several years of poor health after a stroke in 1993.
