= Breeders' Cup Juvenile Turf Sprint top three finishers =

This is a listing of the horses that finished in either first, second, or third place and the number of starters in the Breeders' Cup Juvenile Turf Sprint, a race run on grass on Friday of the Breeders' Cup World Thoroughbred Championships.

Year	Winner	Second	Third	Starters	Ref
2026	Libertango	Hell of A Spin	Mussab	12	
2025	Cy Fair	Brussels	Aspect Island	12	
2024	Magnum Force	Arizona Blaze	Governor Sam	12	
2023	Big Evs	Valiant Force	Starlust	12	
2022	Mischief Magic	Dramatised	Private Creed	12	
2021	Twilight Gleaming	Go Bears Go	Kaufymaker	12	
2020	Golden Pal	Cowan	Ubettabelieveit	12	2020 Equibase
2019	Four Wheel Drive	Chimney Rock	Another Miracle	12	2019
2018	Bulletin	Chelsea Cloisters	So Perfect	12	2018
