= 2022 Preakness Stakes =

147th running of the Preakness Stakes

147th Preakness Stakes
- Preakness Stakes
- Grade I stakes race
- "The Middle Jewel of the Triple Crown" "The Run for the Black-Eyed Susans"
- Location: Pimlico Race Course; Baltimore, Maryland, U.S.
- Date: May 21, 2022
- Distance: 1 3/16 miles
- Winning horse: Early Voting
- Winning time: 1:54.54
- Final odds: 5.70
- Jockey: Jose L. Ortiz
- Trainer: Chad C. Brown
- Owner: Klaravich Stables
- Conditions: Fast
- Surface: Dirt
- Attendance: 42,000

The 2022 Preakness Stakes was the 147th Preakness Stakes, a Grade I stakes race for three-year-old Thoroughbreds at a distance of 1 3/16 miles (1.9 km). The race is one leg of the American Triple Crown and is held annually at Pimlico Race Course in Baltimore, Maryland. The Preakness Stakes is traditionally held on the third Saturday in May, two weeks after the Kentucky Derby.

The 2022 Preakness took place on May 21 with post time scheduled at 7:01 p.m. EDT and television coverage by NBC. The race was won by Early Voting.

== Field ==
The Preakness traditionally features the winner of the Kentucky Derby competing against other runners from that race as well as some "new shooters" – horses that either bypassed the Derby or did not qualify. However, it was announced that Kentucky Derby winner Rich Strike would not be competing at the Preakness, citing the horse's condition and need for rest, and therefore the horse gave up the chance to become a Triple Crown winner. Had Rich Strike competed, he would not have entered the race as the favorite. As a result, this would be just the second instance since 1996 that the Kentucky Derby winner did not run in the Preakness.

A field of nine was drawn for the Preakness Stakes on Monday, May 16; the contenders included Epicenter, Early Voting, and Kentucky Oaks winner Secret Oath. Epicenter was installed as the 6–5 favorite.

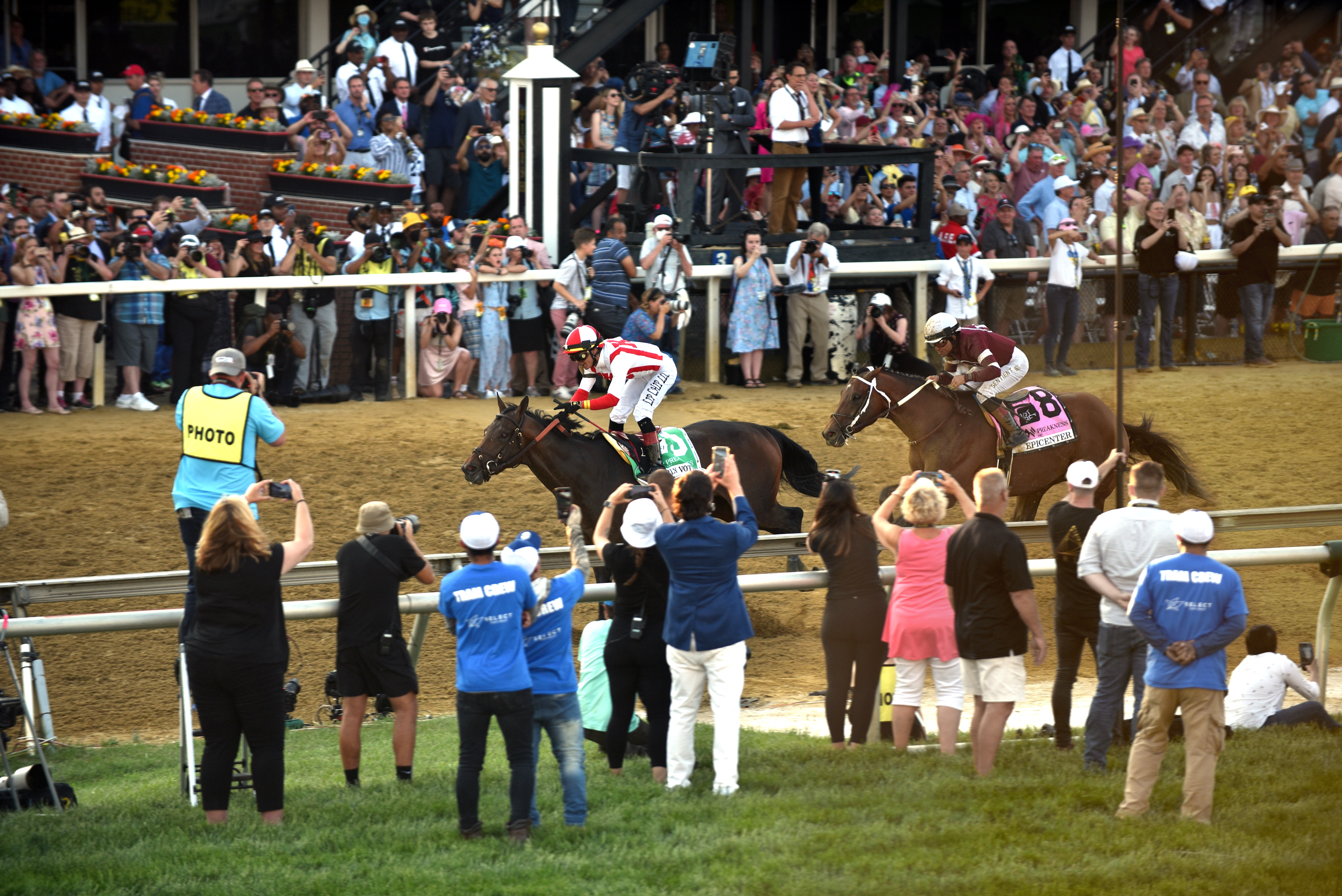
Finish of 2022 Preakness Stakes (Early Voting on left)

== Result ==
Finish	Program Numbers	Horse	Jockey	Trainer	Morning Line Odds	Final Odds	Margin (Lengths)	Winnings
1	5	Early Voting	José Ortiz	Chad C. Brown	7-2	5.70	1 1/4	$990,000
2	8	Epicenter	Joel Rosario	Steve Asmussen	6-5	1.20	1 1/4	$330,000
3	2	Creative Minister	Brian Hernandez Jr.	Kenneth G. McPeek	10-1	10.00	3 1/2	$181,500
4	4	Secret Oath	Luis Saez	D. Wayne Lukas	9-2	5.00	6 1/4	$99,000
5	9	Skippylongstocking	Junior Alvarado	Saffie Joseph Jr.	20-1	12.60	Nose	$49,500
6	1	Simplification	John R. Velazquez	Antonio Sano	6-1	8.10	7 1/2	
7	7	Armagnac	Irad Ortiz Jr.	Tim Yakteen	12-1	18.40	8 3/4	
8	6	Happy Jack	Tyler Gaffalione	Doug O'Neill	30-1	11.90	19 1/4	
9	3	Fenwick	Paco Lopez	Kevin McKathan	50-1	13.20	40 1/2	

Track condition: Fast

Times: 1/4 mile – 0:24.32; 1/2 mile – 0:47.44; 3/4 mile – 1:11.50; mile – 1:35.55; final – 1:54.54.
Splits for each quarter-mile: (:24.32) (:23.12) (:24.06) (:24.05) (:18.99 for final 3/16)

== Payout ==
Pgm	Horse	Win	Place	Show
5	Early Voting	$13.40	$4.60	$3.60
8	Epicenter	–	$2.80	$2.40
2	Creative Minister	–	–	$4.20

- $1 Exacta (5–8) $12.90
- $1 Trifecta (5–8–2) $66.50
- $1 Superfecta (5–8–2–4) $162.90
- $1 Super High Five (5–8–2–4–9) $651.90
