= Early Voting =

American-bred Thoroughbred racehorse (2019–2026)

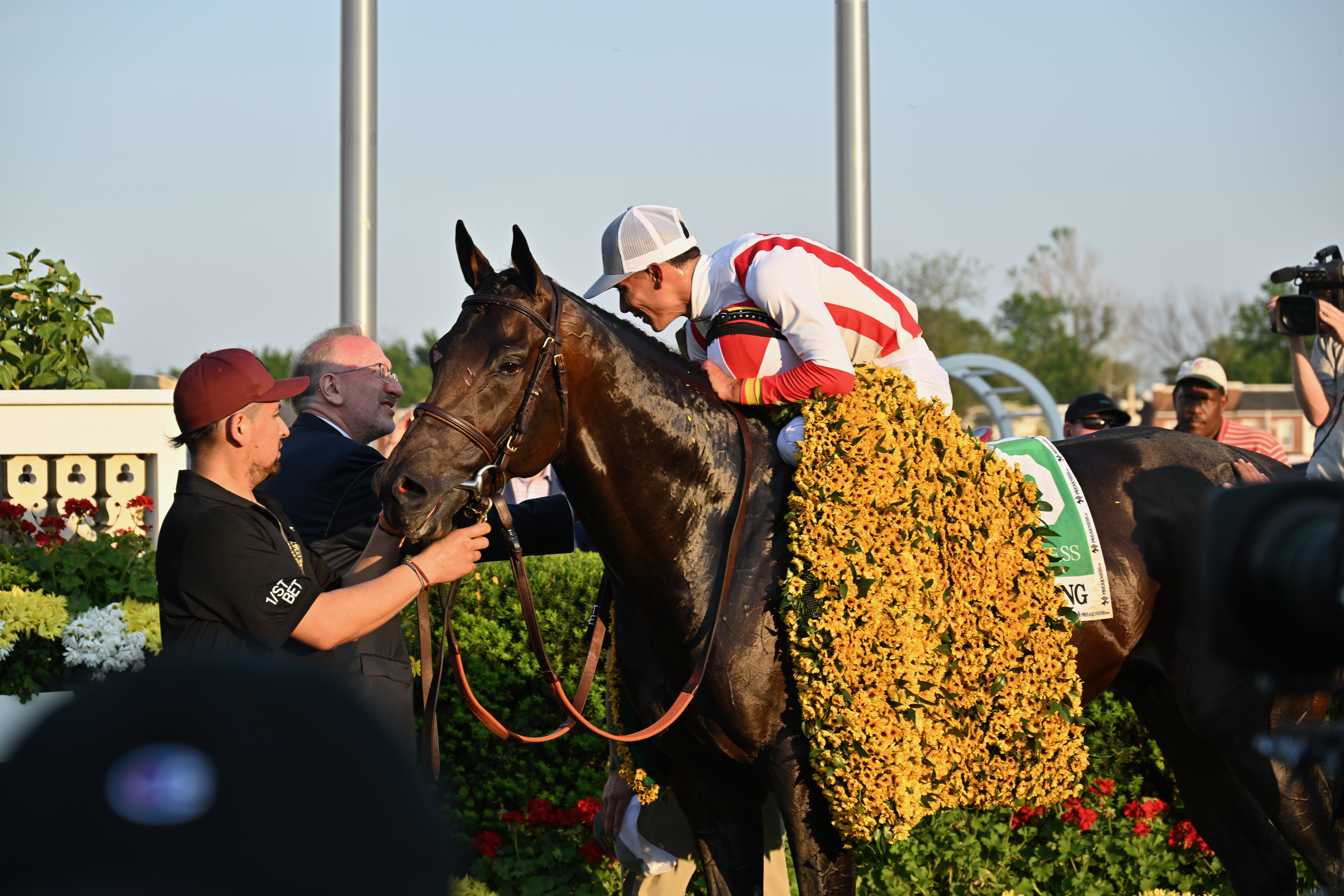
- Early Voting at Preakness Stakes, 2022
- Sire: Gun Runner
- Grandsire: Candy Ride (ARG)
- Dam: Amour D'Ete
- Damsire: Tiznow
- Sex: Stallion
- Foaled: March 7, 2019
- Died: c. October 20, 2026 (aged 7)
- Country: United States
- Colour: Dark Bay
- Breeder: Three Chimneys Farm
- Owner: Klaravich Stables
- Trainer: Chad C. Brown
- Record: 6: 3-1-0
- Earnings: $1,372,500

Major wins
- Withers Stakes (2022); American Triple Crown wins: Preakness Stakes (2022)

Early Voting (March 7, 2019 – c. October 20, 2026) was an American Thoroughbred racehorse that won the 2022 Preakness Stakes, the second leg of the American Triple Crown. He also won the Withers Stakes and was second in the Wood Memorial.

== Background ==
Early Voting was born on March 7, 2019, a dark bay stallion who was bred by Three Chimneys Farm in Kentucky. He was bought by Triphammer Farm on behalf of Klaravich Stables for $200,000 from the Hill 'n' Dale Sales Agency consignment at the 2020 Keeneland September Yearling Sale. He was from the first crop of Gun Runner, the 2017 American Horse of the Year. He was the third of five foals and the lone stakes winner for his dam, Amour d'Ete by Tiznow, who was unraced but is a full-sister to multiple stakes winner Irap. His dam traces to the exceptional broodmare Hildene, a foundation mare for Meadow Stable whose descendants include Hill Prince, First Landing and Cicada.

He was trained by Chad Brown. Early Voting was ridden by jockey José Ortiz in all his starts, and was owned by Klaravich Stables.

== Racing career ==
=== 2021: Two-year-old season ===
Early Voting began his racing career on December 18 in a maiden special weight race over one mile at Aqueduct Racetrack. He faced six other entrants, of which five had previous experience. Nonetheless, Early Voting was highly considered and started as the 19-20 odds-on favorite. He broke well from the outside post and pressed the early pace. He took the lead on the final turn and held under steady urging to win by 1 1/2 lengths in a time of 1:38.41 on a fast track.

=== 2022: Three-year-old season ===
Early Voting began his three-year-old campaign in the Grade III Withers Stakes on February 5 at Aqueduct, one of the early events on the 2022 Road to the Kentucky Derby for New York-based horses. Early Voting, the 13-10 favorite, faced ten other three-year-olds on a clear day with a track that was considered muddy. Jockey Jose Ortiz had Early Voting breaking from the gate quickly and established a two-length lead after a half-mile in :48.04. From there, he was able cruise along on the front, increasing the lead to 3 1/2 lengths after six furlongs in 1:14.29. Early Voting sped away to a safe 6 1/2-length lead at the eighth pole and covered the 1 1/8 miles in 1:55.90. Trainer Brown was reserved in commenting after the race. "He's still inexperienced, and might have been looking for company in the stretch. He'll get better with more seasoning."

After a break of eight weeks, Early Voting was entered in the Grade II Wood Memorial, Aqueduct's most important Kentucky Derby prep. Facing seven other entrants, Early Voting was installed as the third favorite at odds of 5-2 behind Morello and Mo Donegal. Early Voting started sharply and led carving out the early fractions of :47.75 and 1:11.59 on a fast track. However, Early Voting was caught on the line and beaten by a neck by the fast finishing Mo Donegal. Trainer Brown said, "He ran a great race. He was second-best today but that was no disgrace."

He earned 40 qualification points for the Kentucky Derby and after the event was in 16th place for qualification. However, Brown and owner Seth Klarman opted to bypass the Derby because they felt the colt did not have a realistic chance to win the race because of his limited experience. "When you start participating in the Kentucky Derby enough now, you realize what a tough race it is with 20 horses", said Brown. "As the trainer, you have to deal with the aftermath when it doesn't work out. And sometimes, it's not pretty. Those horses need time physically or mentally, and it can really cost a good part of your three-year-old year if you swing and miss."

==== Preakness Stakes ====
Early Voting made his next start on May 21 in the Preakness Stakes, the second leg of the American Triple Crown. With the Kentucky Derby winner Rich Strike bypassing the race, Early Voting went off as the third favorite in a nine that included Epicenter (Louisiana Derby, 2nd in the Kentucky Derby) and Secret Oath (Kentucky Oaks). He rated a couple of lengths off the early pace set by Armagnac, then took the lead near the head of the stretch. He drifted towards the middle of the track while opening a 3 1/2 length lead in mid-stretch, then shifted back to the rail while holding off Epicenter. The final margin was 1 1/4 lengths in a time of 1:54.54. Ortiz said the race had gone to plan. "On the back side, it just felt like we had been drilling in the morning," Ortiz said. "We had been working him just next to a horse, and he was very relaxed. I was very confident passing the 5/8 pole. I knew I was in a good spot. I took a peek back. Nobody was there. I knew my horse was ready."

He won the event on his owner's 65th birthday. Brown commented, "To win this race on Seth's birthday in Baltimore where he grew up and to be able to deliver a gift like that is hard to explain. When you can deliver a classic win, it makes the job worthwhile."

Brown indicated that they would bypass the 2022 Belmont Stakes to give Early Voting time to recover. His next target was to be the Travers Stakes later in the summer.

==== At Saratoga ====
Early Voting was given a layoff, then returned to racing on July 30 in the Jim Dandy Stakes at Saratoga. The field of four were all stakes winners including Epicenter, Zandon and Tawny Port. Early Voting went to the early lead over Zandon along the rail came under coaxing nearing the quarter pole and spun just off the inside into upper stretch loosely between foes, dug in under a drive under threat from a trio and was collared at the eighth pole, then weakened in the late stage and finished last.

The Travers Stakes on August 27 attracted a very strong field, including the top three finishers in the Kentucky Derby (Rich Strike, Epicenter and Zandon), Preakness winner Early Voting and Cyberknife, who had won the Haskell in his last start. Early Voting went four wide on the first turn, tracked the pace on the outside, dropped back four wide around the far turn and faltered then was eased but walked off.

== Statistics ==
Date	Distance	Race	Grade	Track	Odds	Field	Finish	Winning Time	Winning (Losing) Margin	Jockey	Ref
2021 – Two-year-old season
Dec 18, 2021	1 mile	Maiden Special Weight		Aqueduct	0.95*	7	1	1:38.41	1 1/2 lengths	Jose L. Ortiz	
2022 – Three-year-old season
Feb 5, 2022	1 1/8 miles	Withers Stakes	III	Aqueduct	1.30*	11	1	1:55.90	4 1/2 lengths	Jose L. Ortiz	
Apr 9, 2022	1 1/8 miles	Wood Memorial	II	Aqueduct	2.15	8	2	1:47.96	(neck)	Jose L. Ortiz	
May 21, 2022	1 3/16 miles	Preakness Stakes	I	Pimlico	5.70	9	1	1:54.54	1 1/4 lengths	Jose L. Ortiz	
Jul 30, 2022	1 1/8 miles	Jim Dandy Stakes	II	Saratoga	1.85	4	4	1:48.99	(3 3/4 lengths}	Jose L. Ortiz	
Aug 27, 2022	1 1/4 miles	Travers Stakes	I	Saratoga	6.90	8	8	2:00.72	(63 3/4 lengths)	Jose L. Ortiz	

Notes:
An (*) asterisk after the odds means Early Voting was the post-time favourite.

== Stud career ==
On October 5, 2022, Coolmore's Ashford Stud announced that Early Voting had been retired from racing. He then stood at their farm in Versailles, Kentucky for a fee to be announced. His inaugural fee at stud was $25,000 and in his first season he covered 191 mares. In October 2023, it was announced that Early Voting had been removed from stud duties, as he was unable to breed due to anejaculatory syndrome (inability to ejaculate). This problem was treated, and it was announced that Early Voting would pick up stud duties again at Taylor Made Farm in Kentucky, starting with the 2024 season and a stud fee of $20,000. As of March 2025, his stud fee was $12,500. In September 2026, Miss Monica became his first progeny to win a Grade I stakes as she won the Del Mar Debutante Stakes. It was planned to increase his stud fee to $50,000 in 2027.

== Death ==
Early Voting suffered from colic. He was euthanized, and his death was announced on October 20, 2026. He was 7.

== Pedigree ==
Pedigree of Early Voting, bay colt, 7 March 2019
Sire Gun Runner 2013	Candy Ride (ARG); 1999	Ride the Rails; 1991	Cryptoclearance 1984
Sire Gun Runner 2013	Candy Ride (ARG); 1999	Ride the Rails; 1991	Herbalesian 1969
Sire Gun Runner 2013	Candy Ride (ARG); 1999	Candy Girl (ARG); 1990	Candy Stripes 1982
Sire Gun Runner 2013	Candy Ride (ARG); 1999	Candy Girl (ARG); 1990	City Girl (ARG) 1982
Sire Gun Runner 2013	Quiet Giant; 2007	Giant's Causeway; 1997	Storm Cat* 1983
Sire Gun Runner 2013	Quiet Giant; 2007	Giant's Causeway; 1997	Mariah's Storm 1991
Sire Gun Runner 2013	Quiet Giant; 2007	Quiet Dance; 1993	Quiet American 1986
Sire Gun Runner 2013	Quiet Giant; 2007	Quiet Dance; 1993	Misty Dancer 1988
Dam Amour D'Ete 2012	Tiznow; 1997	Cee's Tizzy; 1987	Relaunch 1976
Dam Amour D'Ete 2012	Tiznow; 1997	Cee's Tizzy; 1987	Lonely Dancer 1975
Dam Amour D'Ete 2012	Tiznow; 1997	Cee's Song; 1986	Seattle Song 1981
Dam Amour D'Ete 2012	Tiznow; 1997	Cee's Song; 1986	Key Phrase 1991
Dam Amour D'Ete 2012	Silken Cat; 1993	Storm Cat*; 1983	Storm Bird (CAN) 1978
Dam Amour D'Ete 2012	Silken Cat; 1993	Storm Cat*; 1983	Terlingua 1976
Dam Amour D'Ete 2012	Silken Cat; 1993	Silken Doll; 1980	Chieftain 1961
Dam Amour D'Ete 2012	Silken Cat; 1993	Silken Doll; 1980	Insilca 1974 (family 9-b)

* Early Voting was inbred 4S x 3D to the stallion Storm Cat, meaning that he appears fourth generation on the sire side of his pedigree and third generation on the dam side of his pedigree.
