= Breeders' Cup Challenge =

Series of Thoroughbred horse races

The Breeders' Cup Challenge is a series of Thoroughbred horse races in which the winner earns an automatic spot in a specified Breeders' Cup race. The challenge races change somewhat each year. The Challenge series began in 2007 with 24 "Win and You're In" races from 2 countries. By 2014, the series had grown to 71 races across 13 countries. During that period, 24 winners of Breeders' Cup races had qualified via the challenge series.

Starting in 2011, the Breeders' Cup also pays the entry fee and provides a travel allowance for the connections of the challenge race winners. NBC Sports has a longstanding agreement to both broadcast and live stream many of the "Win and You're In" challenge races, from June to October.

== Current challenge series ==
For 2022, the Breeders' Cup committee restructured the series to ensure there are qualifying races in the east, midwest and west regions for most of the divisions, plus international qualifiers mainly for the turf races. Several races were added: the Grande Prêmio Brasil (Turf - International region), Beverly D. (Filly & Mare Turf - Midwest), Green Flash (Turf Sprint - West region), Miss Grillo (Juvenile Fillies - East region), Ack Ack (Dirt Mile - Midwest region) and Pilgrim (Juvenile Turf - East). The Fleur de Lis, Suburban, John Nerud, Personal Ensign, Iroquois, Pocohantas, Jockey Club Derby, Santa Anita Sprint Championship, Zenyatta and First Lady were removed from the series. The King's Stand Stakes replaced the Diamond Jubilee Stakes as an international qualifier for the Turf Sprint.

== Past challenge series ==
The 2007 series consisted of 24 races held at 6 different racetracks in the United States and Canada. Fourteen of the series winners later raced in the Breeders' Cup, with four of them winning: War Pass in the Juvenile, Ginger Punch in the Distaff, English Channel in the Turf and Curlin in the Classic.

=== 2012 ===
For 2012, the series consisted of 73 races in 10 countries, 52 of which were Grade / Group One events. Thirteen races were added to the series: the (South African) Queen's Plate, Gran Premio 25 de Mayo, Stephen Foster Handicap, Personal Ensign, Grosser Preis von Baden, Gallant Bloom, Pilgrim, Miss Grillo, Bourbon, Royal Lodge, Middle Park, Beresford, and the Prix de la Foret.

Forty-five horses entered in the 2012 Breeders' Cup races qualified via the challenge series, including seven of the winners. These were:

- Fort Larned, who qualified for the Classic by winning the Whitney
- Royal Delta, who won both the Delaware Handicap and Beldame to qualify for the Ladies' Classic
- Little Mike, who qualified for the Turf by winning the Arlington Million
- Wise Dan, who won both the Woodbine Mile and Shadwell Turf Mile to quality for the Breeders' Cup Mile
- Groupie Doll, who qualified for the Filly & Mare Sprint by winning the Thoroughbred Club of America Stakes
- Shanghai Bobby, who earned his berth in the Juvenile by winning both the Hopeful and Champagne
- Calidoscopio, who qualified for the Marathon by winning the Clasico Belgrano

=== 2013 ===
For 2013, nine races were added to the series: the Triple Bend Handicap, Bing Crosby, Yorkshire Oaks, Lowther Stakes, Pat O’Brien, Juvenile Trial, Pocahontas, Iroquois and Canadian Stakes. A number of races that had previously been part of the series were dropped.

Thirty-six horses entered in the 2013 Breeders' Cup races qualified via the challenge series, including four of the winners. These were:

- Mucho Macho Man, who qualified for the Classic by winning the Awesome Again Stakes
- Beholder, who won the Zenyatta Stakes to qualify for the Distaff
- Dank, who earned her berth in the Filly & Mare Turf by winning the Beverly D. Stakes
- Wise Dan, who won the Woodbine Mile to qualify for the Mile

=== 2014 ===
For 2014, seven new races were added to the series: the Paddock Stakes, Queen Elizabeth Stakes, Grande Premio Brasil, Clasico Cesar del Rio, Copa De Oro Vinas De Chile, The Gold Cup at Santa Anita, Haskell Invitational, Belmont Oaks, Matron Stakes, Juddmonte International and Rockfel Stakes. NBC broadcast 18 of the races.

Thirty-seven horses entered in the 2014 Breeders' Cup races qualified via the challenge series, including four of the winners. These were:

- Bayern, who qualified for the Classic by winning the Haskell Invitational
- Main Sequence, who won the Joe Hirsch Turf Classic to qualify for the Turf
- Work All Week, who earned his berth in the Sprint by winning the Phoenix Stakes
- Goldencents, who won the Pat O'Brien Handicap to qualify for the Dirt Mile

=== 2015 ===
For 2015, eight new races were added to the series: the Gran Premio Criadores, Fleur de Lis Handicap, Sussex Stakes, Sword Dancer Invitational, Spinaway, Princess Rooney Handicap, Smile Sprint Handicap, and T. Von Zastrow Stutenpreis. Eighteen races in the series were telecast by NBC.

Thirty-seven entrants in the 2015 Breeders' Cup qualified via the Challenge series with six winning their respective divisions, including American Pharoah.

=== 2016 ===
For 2016, a total of seven races were added to the Challenge series. Four were added in April when the initial announcement was made: the Queen of the Turf (which replaced the Queen Elizabeth Stakes), the Gran Premio Club Hipico Falabella, the Gran Premio Pamplona and the Flying Five Stakes. Three more races from Japan were added in June: the February Stakes, the Yasuda Kinen and the Sprinters Stakes.

Forty-five entrants in the 2016 Breeders' Cup qualified via the Challenge series. Two Challenge series winners went on to win their respective division at the Breeders' Cup: Highland Reel and Classic Empire.

=== 2017 ===
On April 12, 2017, the Breeders Cup organization announced that the 2017 Breeders' Cup Challenge would consist of 81 races from 13 countries. Three races were added to the series: the Belmont Sprint Championship Stakes, the Highlander Stakes and the First Lady Stakes. The Gold Cup at Santa Anita, Belmont Oaks and Canadian Stakes were excluded from the series.

Five winners of Challenge series races went on to win their respective division at the Breeders' Cup:

- Gun Runner, who won the Classic, automatically qualified by winning both the Stephen Foster and Whitney Handicap
- Forever Unbridled won the Distaff after automatically qualifying with victories in both the Fleur de Lis and Personal Ensign
- Rushing Fall qualified in the Jessamine Stakes then went on to win the Juvenile Turf
- Roy H won the Santa Anita Sprint Championship and the Sprint
- World Approval won both the Woodbine Mile and Breeders' Cup Mile

=== 2018 ===
The main change for the 2018 series was the addition of four "win and you're in" races from Royal Ascot: the Queen Anne Stakes providing a berth in the Mile division; the Prince of Wales's Stakes (G1) in the Turf; the Norfolk Stakes in the new Juvenile Turf Sprint; and the Diamond Jubilee Stakes in the Turf Sprint. The Jaipur Invitational was also added as a qualifier for the Turf Sprint. The following races were removed from the series: the TJ Smith (Turf Sprint), the Smile Sprint (Sprint), the T. Von Zastrow Stutenpreis (Filly & Mare Turf) and the Grosser Preis von Baden (Turf). On June 25, three more races were added to the challenge series as qualifiers for the Juvenile Turf Sprint. These were the Futurity at Belmont Park, the Indian Summer Stakes at Keeneland and a new race at Santa Anita, subsequently named the Speakeasy Stakes.

Five automatic qualifiers also won their division of the Breeders' Cup: Sistercharlie (Filly & Mare Turf), Accelerate (Classic), Game Winner, Roy H (Sprint) and Jaywalk (Juvenile Fillies).

=== 2019 ===
The 2019 Breeders' Cup Challenge series consisted of 86 races, 64 of which were Grade/Group One, from across 11 countries. There were 7 new races: the Gran Premio International Carlos Pellegrini (Turf), Prix Morny (Juvenile Turf Sprint), Fourstardave (Mile), Jockey Club Derby (Turf), the Kentucky Downs Turf Sprint (Turf Sprint), Cotillion (Distaff), Prix de l'Abbaye de Longchamp (Turf Sprint) and Prix de l'Arc de Triomphe (Turf). The following races were removed from the series: Doncaster Mile, Legacy Stakes, Gran Premio 25 de Mayo, Highlander, Forego, Spinaway, and Joe Hirsch Turf Classic. The International Stakes, formerly a qualifier for the Turf, became the first ever European qualifier for the Classic.

Five automatic qualifiers won their respective division of the Breeders' Cup:

- Four Wheel Drive, who qualified by winning the Belmont Futurity, won the Juvenile Turf Sprint
- British Idiom, winner of the Alcibiades, also won the Juvenile Fillies
- Iridessa, who qualified by winning the Matron Stakes, won the Filly and Mare Turf
- Blue Prize won the Distaff after qualifying in the Spinster
- Bricks and Mortar qualified by winning the Arlington Million and then won the Turf

Mitole, who qualified for the Dirt Mile by winning the Metropolitan Handicap, won the Sprint. Uni won the Mile after qualifying in the First Lady Stakes for the Filly and Mare Turf.

=== 2020 ===
The 2020 racing schedule was heavily disrupted by the COVID-19 pandemic, and some traditional fixtures of the Challenge series were either rescheduled or not run. New races for 2020 included the Victoria Mile at Tokyo Racecourse (Filly & Mare Turf), Carter Handicap at Belmont Park (Sprint), Alabama Stakes at Saratoga (Distaff) and the Preakness Stakes at Pimlico (Classic). The following races were removed from the 2020 series: Gran Premio Criadores, Gran Premio Club Hipico Falabella, Gran Premio Pamplona, Princess Rooney Handicap, John A. Nerud, Beverly D., Arlington Million, Jockey Club Derby, Cotillion and Sprinters Stakes.

Five winners from the challenge series went on to win at the 2020 Breeders' Cup:

- Aunt Pearl won the Juvenile Fillies Turf after qualifying in the Jessamine
- Essential Quality won the Juvenile after taking the Breeders' Futurity
- Glass Slippers won the Turf Sprint after earning a berth in the Flying Five
- Tarnawa won the Turf after qualifying for the Filly & Mare Turf in the Prix de l'Opéra
- Authentic won the Classic after qualifying in the Haskell

== See also ==
- Road to the Kentucky Derby
