= Big Ass Fans =

American manufacturing company

- Type: Private
- Industry: Manufacturing
- Founded: 1999; 27 years ago
- Headquarters: Lexington, Kentucky, U.S.
- Number of locations: 5
- Area served: Worldwide
- Key people: Ken Walma (CEO)
- Products: Industrial, commercial, agricultural, residential fans, evaporative coolers, and heaters
- Number of employees: 699
- Parent: Madison Industries
- Website: bigassfans.com

Big Ass Fans is an American company that manufactures fans, evaporative coolers, and controls for industrial, agricultural, commercial and residential use. The company's headquarters is in Lexington, Kentucky, with additional offices in Australia, Malaysia, Singapore, Canada and Mexico.

== History ==
Carey Smith incorporated the Delta T. Corporation in 1994 Lexington, Kentucky, to manufacture and install cooling systems for industrial spaces and warehouses. In 1999, Smith signed an exclusive distribution agreement with a California manufacturer of "high-volume, low-speed" (HVLS) ceiling fans, which were sold to farmers for cooling cattle. The company's focus shifted almost exclusively to fan sales, and the company started doing business under the name HVLS Fan Company.

In 2000, the company initiated a marketing campaign with mailers depicting their fans with a picture of the rear of a donkey and the caption "Big Ass Fan". The campaign was successful enough that the company started doing business under the name Big Ass Fans. Fanny, the donkey used in the ad campaign, became the company's logo, and Smith changed his job title to "Chief Big Ass".

In 2006, the company moved its headquarters to a larger facility on Merchant Street in Lexington. By 2010, the company re-occupied its Winchester Road location, in addition to both the Merchant Street location and the research and development facility on Lexington's Jaggie Fox Way, in order to accommodate its continued growth.

In 2014, the company opened a new division called Big Ass Light to sell LED fixtures, and started doing business under the name Big Ass Solutions.

In 2017, the company shut down its facility on Winchester Road, and Smith sold the company to private equity firm Lindsay Goldberg. The company was re-incorporated in Delaware as Big Ass Fans, LLC.

In February 2018, Lennie Rhoades, a senior vice president at JELD-WEN, became CEO. In July 2021, Big Ass Fans was acquired by Madison Industries. In May 2022, Ken Walma, a former executive at Cooper Lighting, among other companies, took over as the company's current CEO.

Big Ass Fans was ranked number one in Fortune magazine's 2022 ranking of 100 Best Medium Workplaces and 100 Best Small and Medium Workplaces for Millennials.

== Naming controversy ==
When the company began their "Big Ass Fan" marketing campaign, some postmasters in Georgia, Mississippi, Michigan, Illinois, Indiana, California and Louisville returned the cards to HVLS as inappropriate. When the company relocated to Lexington's Winchester Road, residents staged protests of a 40-foot (12 m) wide mural depicting the company's name and mascot on the side of its building. Because of the name, Lexington's Blue Grass Airport declined to display advertising from the company in its baggage claim area. The airport later relented and hung a Big Ass Fan and a plaque near the security checkpoint. The Big Ass Fans Facebook page includes a gallery of letters complaining about the company's name, and in 2012, it began a YouTube channel featuring customer voicemail complaints styled as music videos. For schools and religious institutions, however, the company maintains an advertising package that does not include the company name alongside the donkey logo, and some television ads do not have the word "ass" being printed or spoken.

The company's web site sells promotional merchandise with the company name and logo.

== Products ==
The company's first products included several iterations of high-volume low-speed fans for industrial and agricultural use. These fans use airfoils instead of flat blades and feature onboard variable-frequency drives. Big Ass Fans has expanded its product line to include directional, oscillating and mobile fans. The company has developed a line of fans for air-conditioned commercial and residential spaces, LED light fixtures and controls.
