= Wesley A. Ward =

American jockey

Horse racing career
- Sport: Horse racing
- Career wins: 2,000+ (ongoing)

Major racing wins
- As a jockey: Ancient Title Stakes (1985); Distaff Handicap (1985) As a trainer: Will Rogers Handicap (1994); San Francisco Mile Stakes (1995); Shoemaker Breeders' Cup Mile Stakes (1995); Los Angeles Handicap (1997); Vernon O. Underwood Stakes (2000, 2001); Palos Verdes Handicap (2001); San Miguel Stakes (2003); Genuine Risk Handicap (2004); Vagrancy Handicap (2004); Windsor Castle Stakes (2009, 2014); Queen Mary Stakes (2009, 2015, 2016, 2020); Oklahoma Derby (2010, 2012); Coolmore Lexington Stakes (2012); Norfolk Stakes (Great Britain) (2013, 2018); Prix Morny (2013, 2016, 2020); Tremont Stakes (2014); Diamond Jubilee Stakes (2015); King's Stand Stakes (2017); Sandringham Handicap (2017); Indian Summer Stakes (2019, 2021); Commonwealth Cup (2021); Nunthorpe Stakes (2026) Breeders' Cup wins: Breeders' Cup Juvenile Turf (2014); Breeders' Cup Filly & Mare Sprint (2014); Breeders' Cup Juvenile Turf Sprint (2019, 2020, 2021); Breeders' Cup Turf Sprint (2021)

Wesley A. Ward (born March 3, 1968 in Selah, Washington) is a retired American Champion jockey and a current trainer in Thoroughbred horse racing.

== Background ==
Ward grew up in the horse racing industry, being the son of trainer Dennis Ward.

== Riding career ==
In 1984, Wesley Ward was voted the Eclipse Award for Outstanding Apprentice Jockey following a season in which he won riding championships at Aqueduct Racetrack, Belmont Park, and the Meadowlands Racetrack and rode 335 winners. He went on to compete at racetracks in Italy, Malaysia and Singapore before his battles with weight gain led to retirement in 1989.

Ward was represented by agent Lenny Goodman.

== Training career ==
Wesley Ward turned to training, first as an assistant to his father before going out on his own in 1991. He earned his first stakes victory as a trainer in 1994 at Hollywood Park, winning the Cinema Handicap. Based in California, he also races at Gulfstream Park in Florida during the winter months. He has had 3 children, Riley Ward, Denae Ward and Jackson Ward.

On June 16, 2009, Ward became the first U.S.-based conditioner to ship a horse to England and win a stakes race at the prestigious Royal Ascot meeting. Strike the Tiger, a 2-year-old gelding co-bred and co-owned by Ward, shocked the meet by taking the Windsor Castle Stakes at odds of 33–1. The following day, Ward sent out a 2-year-old filly named Jealous Again to claim an even bigger Ascot victory. She took the Group 2 Queen Mary Stakes by a comfortable five lengths.

Ward also suffered setbacks at that Ascot meeting—4-year-old Cannonball was sixth in the Group 1 King's Stand Stakes, and juveniles Yogaroo (Norfolk Stakes-G2), Aegean (Albany Stakes-G3) and Honor in Peace (Chesham Stakes) were also-rans in their events. But Cannonball was wheeled back on four days' rest, almost unheard of in American racing circles, and ran second in the Golden Jubilee Stakes (Gr. 1). In 2013 Ward scored a further Royal Ascot success when No Nay Never won the Group 2 Norfolk Stakes and a first European Group 1 win when the same horse won the Prix Morny at Deauville in August. In 2014, Ward scored his fourth Royal Ascot victory with Hootenanny in the Windsor Castle stakes over 23 other horses by four lengths. At the 2014 Breeders Cup, Ward scored his first victory with Hootenanny in the Breeders' Cup Juvenile Turf. One day later, Ward scored his second victory with Judy the Beauty in the Breeders' Cup Filly & Mare Sprint. 2015 brought a fifth Royal Ascot success when Ryan Moore rode Acapulco to win the Queen Mary Stakes, giving Ward his second victory in that race.

In 2015, Wesley Ward was inducted into the Washington Thoroughbred Hall of Fame.

At the 2017 Royal Ascot meeting, Ward trainee Con Te Partiro took the Sandringham Handicap at odds of 20-1 ridden by Jamie Spencer.
