= Indian Summer Stakes =

- Class: Grade III
- Location: Keeneland; Lexington, Kentucky
- Inaugurated: 1991
- Race type: Thoroughbred - Flat racing

Race information
- Distance: 5½ furlongs
- Surface: Turf
- Track: Left-handed
- Qualification: Two-year-olds
- Purse: US$250,000

The Indian Summer Stakes is an American Thoroughbred horse race held annually at Keeneland race course in Lexington, Kentucky. A Grade III for two-year-olds with a purse currently set at $250,000, it is run on the track's grass course over a distance of 5½ furlongs.

Inaugurated in 1991 as a race on the Keeneland dirt track, the Indian Summer Stakes was placed on hiatus after the 2001 running that had been won by the filly Vicki Vallencourt for owners Rick & Ron Rashinski.

In October 2018 the race name was revived but with different conditions as part of the Breeders' Cup Challenge "Win and You're In" series in which the annual Indian Summer Stakes winner would receive an automatic berth in the year's newly created $1 million Breeders' Cup Juvenile Turf Sprint.

== Records ==
Speed record:

- 5 1/2 furlongs - 1:02.28 Schwarzenegger (2025)
- 6 furlongs – 1:10.17 Freefourracing (2000)
- 7 furlongs – 1:23.41 Sock City (1992)

Margins:

- 10 lengths – Lilly Capote (1994)

Most wins by a jockey:

- 3 - Pat Day (1994, 1999, 2000)

Most wins by a trainer:

- 3 - Wesley A. Ward (2019, 2021, 2025)

Most wins by an owner:

- no owner won this race more than once

== Winners ==
Year	Winner	Jockey	Trainer	Owner	Distance	Time	Purse	Grade	Ref
2026	Adonius (IRE)	John R. Velazquez	Rebecca Menzies	Riverdee Stable, West Paces Racing and Michael Hughes	5 1/2 furlongs	1:03.46	$291,100	III	
2025	Schwarzenegger	John R. Velazquez	Wesley A. Ward	Mrs. John Magnier, Mountmellick Farm, Brook T. Smith & Resolution Road Stable	5 1/2 furlongs	1:02.28	$289,125	Listed	
2024	Governor Sam	Paco Lopez	George Weaver	Bregman Family Racing & Swinbank Stables (Reagan Swinbank)	5 1/2 furlongs	1:02.72	$238,257	Listed	
2023	Committee of One	Cristian Torres	Steve Asmussen	J. Kirk & Judy Robison	5 1/2 furlongs	1:02.40	$243,907	Listed	
2022	Private Creed	Joel Rosario	Steve Asmussen	Mike McCarty	5 1/2 furlongs	1:02.30	$244,688	Listed	
2021	Averly Jane	Tyler Gaffalione	Wesley A. Ward	Hat Creek Racing (Gatewood Bell)	5 1/2 furlongs	1:02.65	$200,000	Listed	
2020	Bodenheimer	Brian Hernandez Jr.	Valorie Lund	Kristin Boice & Marylou Holden	5 1/2 furlongs	1:02.70	$150,000	Listed	
2019	Kimari	Mike E. Smith	Wesley A. Ward	Ten Broeck Farm (Phil & Orintha Silva)	5 1/2 furlongs	1:03.03	$200,000		
2018	Strike Silver	Julien Leparoux	Mark E. Casse	John C. Oxley	5 1/2 furlongs	1:05.00	$200,000		
2002–2017		Race not held							
2001	Vicki Vallencourt	Mark Guidry	Hugh H. Robertson	Rick & Ron Rashinski	6 furlongs	1:11.88	$80,625	Listed	
2000	Freefourracing	Pat Day	Neil D. Drysdale	Robert & Janice McNair	6 furlongs	1:10.17	$82,525	Listed	
1999	Mycatcandance	Pat Day	D. Wayne Lukas	Padua Stables (Satish & Anne Sanan)	6 furlongs	1:10.33	$70,200	Listed	
1998	The Happy Hopper	Willie Martinez	Robert E. Holthus	Kerry & Lina Ozment	6 furlongs	1:10.84	$67,750	Listed	
1997	Race not held								
1996	High Heeled Hope	Shane Sellers	Randy K. Bradshaw	Paraneck Stable (Ernie Paragallo)	7 furlongs	1:23.99	$61,300	Listed	
1995	J. D. and Water	Shane Sellers	Steven L. Morguelan	Glencrest Farm & Stewart Madison	7 furlongs	1:24.39	$54,800	Listed	
1994	Lilly Capote	Pat Day	D. Wayne Lukas	James C. Spence	7 furlongs	1:24.43	$36,750		
1993	Little Shocker	Fabio Arguello Jr.	Dale Romans	Terry Raymond & Kyle Nagle	7 furlongs	1:23.41	$41,825		
1992	Sock City	Brent Bartram	Anthony L. Reinstedler	Elizabeth S. Lavin	7 furlongs	1:23.45	$44,100		
1991	Cadillac Women	Perry Compton	Thomas J. Pryor	Thomas J. Pryor & Jones Biven	7 furlongs	1:23.87	$38,600		

Legend:
Dirt Turf
