= Wonder Wheel (horse) =

American racehorse

- Sire: Into Mischief
- Grandsire: Harlan's Holiday
- Dam: Wonder Gal
- Damsire: Tiz Wonderful
- Sex: Filly
- Foaled: February 7, 2020 (age 6)
- Country: United States
- Colour: Dark Bay or Brown
- Breeder: Three Chimneys Farm & Clearsky Farms
- Owner: D. J. Stable
- Trainer: Mark E. Casse
- Record: 9:4–2–0
- Earnings: $1,591,857

Major wins
- Alcibiades Stakes (2022); Breeders' Cup wins: Breeders' Cup Juvenile Fillies (2022)

Awards
- American Champion Two-Year-Old Filly (2022)
- Last updated on 2 July 2023

Wonder Wheel (foaled February 7, 2020) is a champion American Thoroughbred racehorse who won the 2022 Breeders' Cup Juvenile Fillies and was named the 2022 Champion Two-Year-Old Filly.

== Background ==
Wonder Wheel is a dark bay or brown filly who was bred in Kentucky by Three Chimneys Farm and Clearsky Farms and was a $275,000 purchase at the 2021 September Keeneland sale by D. J. Stables. Her dam Wonder Gal was GI placed several times and a winner of $904,800 who died earlier in 2022. Her other foal, Road Bible, a 4-year-old son of Pioneerof the Nile is a three-time winner with earnings of $70,480.

Wonder Wheel is trained by US Hall of Fame trainer Mark E. Casse.

== Retirement ==
After a string of poor performances as a three-year-old D. J. Stables announced the retirement of Wonder Wheel and that she would be offered in the Keeneland, Fasig-Tipton's November Sale (2023).

== Statistics ==
Date	Distance	Race	Grade	Track	Odds	Field	Finish	Winning Time	Winning (Losing) Margin	Jockey	Ref
2022 – Two-year-old season
Jun 3, 2022	5 1/2 furlongs	Maiden Special Weight		Churchill Downs	2.20	7	1	1:04.73	2 1/4 lengths	Tyler Gaffalione	
Jul 4, 2022	6 furlongs	Debutante Stakes	Listed	Churchill Downs	1.80	7	1	1:10.26	6 3/4 lengths	Tyler Gaffalione	
Sep 4, 2022	7 furlongs	Spinaway Stakes	I	Saratoga	1.45*	10	2	1:24.03	(1 1/2 lengths)	Tyler Gaffalione	
Oct 7, 2022	1 1/16 miles	Alcibiades Stakes	I	Keeneland	4.10*	14	1	1:45.17	nose	Tyler Gaffalione	
Nov 4, 2022	1 1/16 miles	Breeders' Cup Juvenile Fillies	I	Keeneland	6.50	13	1	1:44.90	3 lengths	Tyler Gaffalione	
2023 – Three-year-old season
Feb 11, 2023	1 mile & 40 yards	Suncoast Stakes	Listed	Tampa Bay Downs	0.50*	8	2	1:40.18	(neck)	Tyler Gaffalione	
April 7, 2023	1 1/16 miles	Ashland Stakes	I	Keeneland	1.53	7	6	1:43.31	(5 3/4 lengths)	Tyler Gaffalione	
May 5, 2023	1 1/8 miles	Kentucky Oaks	I	Churchill Downs	10.32	14	9	1:49.77	(10 1/4 lengths)	Joel Rosario	
Jul 1, 2023	1 1/16 miles	Selene Stakes	III	Woodbine	0.65*	9	8	1:42.65	(21 3/4 lengths)	Patrick Husbands	

Notes:
An (*) asterisk after the odds means Wonder Wheel was the post-time favourite.

== Pedigree ==
Pedigree of Wonder Wheel, filly, February 7, 2020
Sire Into Mischief (2005)	Harlan's Holiday (1999)	Harlan (1989)	Storm Cat (1983)
Sire Into Mischief (2005)	Harlan's Holiday (1999)	Harlan (1989)	Country Romance (1976)
Sire Into Mischief (2005)	Harlan's Holiday (1999)	Christmas in Aiken (1992)	Affirmed (1975)
Sire Into Mischief (2005)	Harlan's Holiday (1999)	Christmas in Aiken (1992)	Dowager (1980)
Sire Into Mischief (2005)	Leslie's Lady (1996)	Tricky Creek (1986)	Clever Trick (1976)
Sire Into Mischief (2005)	Leslie's Lady (1996)	Tricky Creek (1986)	Battle Creek Girl (1977)
Sire Into Mischief (2005)	Leslie's Lady (1996)	Crystal Lady (Canada) (1990)	Stop The Music (1970)
Sire Into Mischief (2005)	Leslie's Lady (1996)	Crystal Lady (Canada) (1990)	One Last Bird (1980)
Dam Wonder Gal (2012)	Tiz Wonderful (2004)	Tiznow (1997)	Cee's Tizzy (1987)
Dam Wonder Gal (2012)	Tiz Wonderful (2004)	Tiznow (1997)	Cee's Song (1986)
Dam Wonder Gal (2012)	Tiz Wonderful (2004)	Evil (1998)	Hennessy (1993)
Dam Wonder Gal (2012)	Tiz Wonderful (2004)	Evil (1998)	Lit'l Rose (1987)
Dam Wonder Gal (2012)	Passe (2006)	Dixie Union (1997)	Dixieland Band (1980)
Dam Wonder Gal (2012)	Passe (2006)	Dixie Union (1997)	She's Tops (1989)
Dam Wonder Gal (2012)	Passe (2006)	Gal On the Go (1998)	Irgun (1991)
Dam Wonder Gal (2012)	Passe (2006)	Gal On the Go (1998)	Gypsy (1992) (family 12b)
