= Breeders' Cup Juvenile Turf Sprint =

American Thoroughbred horse race

- Class: Grade 1
- Location: United States
- Inaugurated: 2018 (as part of Breeders' Cup)
- Race type: Thoroughbred - Flat racing
- Website: Breeders' Cup

Race information
- Distance: 5 or 5 1/2 furlongs
- Surface: Turf
- Track: Left-handed
- Qualification: Two-year-olds
- Weight: 122 lbs. – colts and geldings 119 lbs. – fillies
- Purse: US$1,000,000

The Breeders' Cup Juvenile Turf Sprint is an American Thoroughbred horse race for two-year-old horses, run on a grass course at a distance of 5 or 5 1/2 furlongs, depending on the configuration of the host track. It is part of the Breeders' Cup World Championships, the de facto year-end championship for North American thoroughbred racing. All Breeders' Cups to date have been conducted in the United States, with the exception of the 1996 event in Canada.

In 2017, a race named the Juvenile Turf Sprint was held at Del Mar Racetrack as part of the 2017 Breeders' Cup undercard. The race was run for the first time as a Breeders' Cup Championship race in 2018 during the first day of the Breeders' Cup at Churchill Downs in Louisville, Kentucky. Prior to 2018 the Juvenile Turf Sprint was run as an undercard race at the Breeders' Cup. The race was not eligible for grading in its first year but from 2019 it was a Grade II event and since 2022 it has been run as a Grade I race.

The distance of the race varies depending on the configuration of the host race track:

- 5 furlongs – 2019, 2021, 2023–2025
- 5 1/2 furlongs – 2018, 2020, 2022, 2026

== Automatic berths ==
Beginning in 2007, the Breeders' Cup developed the Breeders' Cup Challenge, a series of races in each division that allotted automatic qualifying bids to winners of defined races. Each of the fourteen divisions has multiple qualifying races. Note that one horse may win multiple challenge races, while other challenge winners will not be entered in the Breeders' Cup for a variety of reasons such as injury or travel considerations.

In the Juvenile Turf Sprint division, runners are limited to either 12 or 14 depending on the configuration of the host racetrack. The 2022 "Win and You're In" races were:

1. Norfolk Stakes, a Group 2 race run in June at Ascot Racecourse in Berkshire, England
2. Prix Morny, a Group One race run in August at Deauville in France
3. Speakeasy Stakes, a race run in October at Santa Anita Park in California
4. Belmont Futurity Stakes, a Grade 3 race run in October at Aqueduct Racetrack in New York
5. Indian Summer Stakes, a race run in October at Keeneland in Kentucky

== Records ==
Most wins by a jockey:

- 4 – Irad Ortiz Jr. (2019, 2020, 2021, 2025)

Most wins by a trainer:

- 3 – Wesley Ward (2019, 2020, 2021)

Most wins by an owner:

- No owner has won this race more than once

== Winners ==
| Year | Winner | Jockey | Trainer | Owner | Track | Distance | Time | Purse | Grade | Ref |
|---|---|---|---|---|---|---|---|---|---|---|
Breeders' Cup Juvenile Turf Sprint
| 2026 | Libertango (IRE) | Billy Loughnane | George Boughey | Vefa Ibrahim Araci | Keeneland | 5 1/2 furlongs | 1:02.64 | $1,000,000 | I | |
| 2025 | Cy Fair | Irad Ortiz Jr. | George Weaver | Swinbank Stables, Medallion Racing, Joey Platts & Mark Stanton | Del Mar | 5 furlongs | 56.20 | $1,000,000 | I | |
| 2024 | Magnum Force (IRE) | Colin Keane | Ger Lyons | Abdulla Al Khalifa | Del Mar | 5 furlongs | 56.36 | $1,000,000 | I | |
| 2023 | Big Evs (IRE) | Tom Marquand | Michael Appleby | RP Racing Ltd | Santa Anita | 5 furlongs | 55.31 | $1,000,000 | I | |
| 2022 | Mischief Magic (IRE) | William Buick | Charlie Appleby | Godolphin Racing | Keeneland | 5 1/2 furlongs | 1:02.41 | $1,000,000 | I | |
| 2021 | Twilight Gleaming (IRE) | Irad Ortiz Jr. | Wesley Ward | Stonestreet Stables | Del Mar | 5 furlongs | 56.24 | $1,000,000 | II | |
| 2020 | Golden Pal | Irad Ortiz Jr. | Wesley Ward | Ranlo Investments | Keeneland | 5 1/2 furlongs | 1:02.82 | $1,000,000 | II | |
| 2019 | Four Wheel Drive | Irad Ortiz Jr. | Wesley Ward | Breeze Easy, LLC | Santa Anita | 5 furlongs | 55.66 | $1,000,000 | II | |
| 2018 | Bulletin | Javier Castellano | Todd A. Pletcher | WinStar Farm | Churchill Downs | 5 1/2 furlongs | 1:05.54 | $1,000,000 | Listed | |

== See also ==
- Breeders' Cup Juvenile Turf Sprint "top three finishers" and starters
- List of American and Canadian Graded races
