= Epicenter (horse) =

American-bred Thoroughbred racehorse

- Sire: Not This Time
- Grandsire: Giant's Causeway
- Dam: Silent Candy
- Damsire: Candy Ride (ARG)
- Sex: Stallion
- Foaled: January 29, 2019 (age 6)
- Country: United States
- Color: Bay
- Breeder: Westwind Farms
- Owner: Winchell Thoroughbreds
- Trainer: Steve Asmussen
- Record: 11: 6-3-0
- Earnings: $2,940,639

Major wins
- Risen Star Stakes (2022); Louisiana Derby (2022); Jim Dandy Stakes (2022); Travers Stakes (2022)

Awards
- American Champion Three-Year-Old Male Horse (2022)
- Last updated on August 29, 2023

Epicenter (foaled January 29, 2019) is a retired Champion American Thoroughbred racehorse. In 2022 he won the Risen Star, Louisiana Derby, Jim Dandy and Travers Stakes. He also finished second as the favorite in both the 2022 Kentucky Derby and Preakness Stakes.

== Background ==
Epicenter was bred in Kentucky by Westwind Farms. He was sired by Not This Time, a graded stakes winner who finished second in the 2016 Breeders' Cup Juvenile before his career has cut short by injury. His dam, Silent Candy, is a stakes-winning daughter of Candy Ride. In 2022 Not This Time stood at Taylor Made Stallions in Kentucky for US$75,000 service fee.

Epicenter was sold at the 2020 Keeneland September Yearling Sale for $260,000 to Winchell Thoroughbreds, owned by Ron Winchell. He is trained by Hall of Famer Steve Asmussen. Winchell and Asmussen had previously combined forces with champions Untapable and Gun Runner.

== Racing career ==
=== 2021: two-year-old season ===
Epicenter made his first start on September 18, 2021, in a maiden special weight race at Churchill Downs over seven furlongs. He went to the early lead, setting fast opening fractions of 22.37 seconds for the first quarter-mile and 45.72 for the half. However, he tired in the stretch and finished sixth. He returned on November 13 in another maiden special weight at Churchill Downs, this time at a distance of one mile. He vied for the earlier lead with Surfer Dude, then kicked clear in the stretch to win by 3 1/2 lengths.

Epicenter made his final start of the year on December 26 in the newly created Gun Runner Stakes, an early prep race on the Road to the Kentucky Derby over 1 1/16 miles at Fair Grounds Race Course in Louisiana. He pressed the early pace while racing two wide, then moved to the lead at the top of the stretch and won by 6 1/2 lengths.

"To be able to win the inaugural running of the Gun Runner today is special for us," said Scott Blasi, Asmussen's assistant trainer. "Gun Runner had his start and a number of breakout performances here at the Fair Grounds, and to see what he has done in the stallion barn has been historical. He's the leading two-year-old stallion in the world. To be able to win this race for the Winchell family is very special."

=== 2022: three-year-old season ===
Epicenter began his three-year-old campaign on January 22, 2022, in the Lecomte Stakes at the Fair Grounds. He went to the early lead and set sensible fractions. In the stretch, first Pappacap and then Call Me Midnight made strong moves. Epicenter held off Pappacap but was caught at the wire by Call Me Midnight, losing by a head.

Epicenter returned to racing on February 19 in the Risen Star Stakes. He went to the early lead and set a moderate pace, then opened up a wide lead in mid-stretch. Geared down for the final strides, he won by 2 3/4 lengths over Smile Happy, with Zandon closing for third. "It was a little different than his last race, as every fraction was perfect for him," said Winchell. "He was nice and comfortable and you just hope he'll finish the race, which he did."

On March 26, Epicenter went off as the even-money favorite in the Louisiana Derby. He broke slowly, so jockey Joel Rosario moved him to the inside, where he rated in third place. On the final turn, he moved to the outside and began closely steadily, striking the lead near the head of the stretch. He continued to draw away and won by 2 1/2 lengths over Zozos. His time of 1:54.38 for 1 3/16 miles set a track record. "He took a little dirt today and he didn't mind it," said Rosario. "He was off the pace today and inside of horses. It seems like he can be special. The way he did it today, the mile and a quarter (of the Derby) shouldn't be a problem. We will see what happens."

Epicenter went off as the 4-1 favorite in a very deep field for the 2022 Kentucky Derby. Other highly regarded contenders included Zandon (Blue Grass Stakes), Taiba (Santa Anita Derby), White Abarrio (Florida Derby), Messier (second in Santa Anita Derby), Cyberknife (Arkansas Derby), and Mo Donegal (Wood Memorial). Epicenter broke slowly and settled in mid-pack behind a very fast pace set by Summer is Tomorrow and Crown Pride. He saved ground around the first turn, then shifted out around the final turn as he started to make up ground. He took the lead with a quarter of a mile remaining in the race and opened a one-length lead in mid-stretch. Zandon was closing on his outside while on the inside, Rich Strike found room on the rail. Epicenter responded to the challenge from Zandon but could not match Rich Strike's closing kick. He finished second by three-quarters of a length to one of the biggest upset winners in the history of the Derby.

After the race, Asmussen said he could not believe Epicenter had lost after he took the lead in the stretch. "Then "I saw [Rich Strike], and I'm like, 'No! He's not going to beat us.' And he did,” said Asmussen. "Hats off to him. They won the Kentucky Derby. What a story."

Epicenter went off as the 6-5 favorite in the 2022 Preakness Stakes on May 21. He was squeezed back at the break and settled near the back of the pack. Still in seventh place after three-quarters of a mile, he began to make up ground along the rail near the top of the stretch. Meanwhile, Early Voting tracked the early pace set by Armagnac and moved to the lead entering the stretch, pulling well clear with an eighth of a mile remaining. Epicenter closed steadily, first on the inside and then to the outside as Early Voting shifted towards the rail. He finished second by 1 1/4 lengths.

Epicenter was given a layoff, then returned to racing on July 30 in the Jim Dandy Stakes at Saratoga. The field of four were all stakes winners, with Epicenter going off as the even-money favorite. Early Voting went to the early lead while Epicenter settled in last place along the rail. He swung five-wide moving into the stretch and moved steadily to the lead to win by 1 1/2 lengths over Zandon, with Early Voting finishing fourth.

The Travers Stakes on August 27 attracted a very strong field, including the top three finishers in the Kentucky Derby (Rich Strike, Epicenter, and Zandon), Preakness winner Early Voting, and Cyberknife, who had won the Haskell in his last start. Epicenter was again the even-money favorite. He settled in fourth-place behind Cyberknife, who set moderate fractions for the first three-quarters of a mile. Epicenter then began his move on the outside, taking the lead at the quarter-pole. He continued to draw away down the stretch to win by 5 1/4 lengths over Cyberknife, with Zandon in third and Rich Strike fourth.

It was the first Travers Stakes win for Asmussen and Rosario. "We walked over today with a tremendous amount of confidence in the horse," said Asmussen, "but definitely remember we felt exactly that way walking over for this year's Derby. He was away cleanly and thought he was very comfortable and attending close enough to the pace, and just ran a very dominating performance against a very good group."

Epicenter made his final start in the 2022 Breeders' Cup Classic at Keeneland on November 5. He was pulled up on the first turn after an injury to his right forelimb. He walked onto the equine ambulance and was transported to nearby Rood & Riddle Equine Hospital for further evaluation. The Daily Racing Form later reported that Epicenter suffered a lateral condylar fracture to his right foreleg and was expected to undergo surgery at Rood & Riddle the following morning. On November 6, Asmussen confirmed that Epicenter would be retired from racing, adding that the surgery was successful and the prognosis for him to stand at stud was good.

In 2025, Epicenter was standing at stud at Ashford Stud, Versailles, Kentucky for a fee of $35,000.

== Statistics ==
Date	Distance	Race	Grade	Track	Odds	Field	Finish	Winning Time	Winning (Losing) Margin	Jockey	Ref
2021 – Two-year-old season
Sep 18, 2021	7 furlongs	Maiden Special Weight		Churchill Downs	13.20	10	6	1:22.75	(7 3/4 lengths)	Ricardo Santana Jr.	
Nov 13, 2021	1 mile	Maiden Special Weight		Churchill Downs	3.10	10	1	1:36.36	3 1/2 lengths	Joel Rosario	
Dec 26, 2021	1 1/16 miles	Gun Runner Stakes		Fair Grounds	2.90	7	1	1:44.19	6 1/2 lengths	Brian Hernandez Jr.	
2022 – Three-year-old season
Jan 22, 2022	1 1/16 miles	Lecomte Stakes	III	Fair Grounds	1.60	9	2	1:44.36	(head)	Brian Hernandez Jr.	
Feb 19, 2022	1 1/8 miles	Risen Star Stakes	II	Fair Grounds	3.50	10	1	1:49.03	2 3/4 lengths	Joel Rosario	
Mar 26, 2022	1 3/16 miles	Louisiana Derby	II	Fair Grounds	1.00*	9	1	1:54.38 (Note: New track record)	2 1/2 lengths	Joel Rosario	
May 7, 2022	1 1/4 miles	Kentucky Derby	I	Churchill Downs	4.10*	20	2	2:02.61	(3/4 length)	Joel Rosario	
May 21, 2022	1 3/16 miles	Preakness Stakes	I	Pimlico	1.20*	9	2	1:54.54	(1 1/4 lengths)	Joel Rosario	
Jul 30, 2022	1 1/8 miles	Jim Dandy Stakes	II	Saratoga	1.10*	4	1	1:48.99	1 1/2 lengths	Joel Rosario	
Aug 27, 2022	1 1/4 miles	Travers Stakes	I	Saratoga	1.00*	8	1	2:00.72	5 1/4 lengths	Joel Rosario	
Nov 5, 2022	1 1/4 miles	Breeders' Cup Classic	I	Keeneland	6.14	8	DNF	2:00.05	–	Joel Rosario	

Notes:
An (*) asterisk after the odds means Epicenter was the post-time favorite.

== Retirement and stud ==
On December 4, 2022, Coolmore Stud announced that Epicenter would stand at their Ashford Stud for 2023 at a fee of $45,000.

== Pedigree ==
Pedigree of Epicenter, bay colt, January 29, 2019
Sire Not This Time (2014)	Giant's Causeway (1997)	Storm Cat (1983)	Storm Bird (Canada) (1978)
Sire Not This Time (2014)	Giant's Causeway (1997)	Storm Cat (1983)	Terlingua (1976)
Sire Not This Time (2014)	Giant's Causeway (1997)	Mariah's Storm (1991)	Rahy (1985)
Sire Not This Time (2014)	Giant's Causeway (1997)	Mariah's Storm (1991)	Immense (1979)
Sire Not This Time (2014)	Miss Macy Sue (2003)	Trippi (1997)	End Sweep (1991)
Sire Not This Time (2014)	Miss Macy Sue (2003)	Trippi (1997)	Jealous Appeal (1983)
Sire Not This Time (2014)	Miss Macy Sue (2003)	Yada Yada (1996)	Great Above (1972)
Sire Not This Time (2014)	Miss Macy Sue (2003)	Yada Yada (1996)	Stem (1982)
Dam Silent Candy (2007)	Candy Ride (ARG) (1999)	Ride The Rails (1991)	Cryptoclearance (1984)
Dam Silent Candy (2007)	Candy Ride (ARG) (1999)	Ride The Rails (1991)	Herbalesian (1969)
Dam Silent Candy (2007)	Candy Ride (ARG) (1999)	Candy Girl (ARG) (1990)	Candy Stripes (1982)
Dam Silent Candy (2007)	Candy Ride (ARG) (1999)	Candy Girl (ARG) (1990)	City Girl (ARG) (1982)
Dam Silent Candy (2007)	Silent Queen (2000)	King of Kings (IRE) (1995)	Sadler's Wells (1981)
Dam Silent Candy (2007)	Silent Queen (2000)	King of Kings (IRE) (1995)	Zummerrudd (IRE) (1981)
Dam Silent Candy (2007)	Silent Queen (2000)	Soundproff (1990)	Ela-Mana-Mou (IRE) (1976)
Dam Silent Candy (2007)	Silent Queen (2000)	Soundproff (1990)	Hobe Sound (IRE) (1982) (family 21-a)
