= Modern Games =

Irish-bred Thoroughbred racehorse

- Racing silks of Godolphin
- Sire: Dubawi
- Grandsire: Dubai Millennium
- Dam: Modern Ideals
- Damsire: New Approach
- Sex: Colt
- Foaled: 17 April 2019
- Country: Ireland
- Colour: Chestnut
- Breeder: Godolphin
- Owner: Godolphin
- Trainer: Charlie Appleby
- Record: 16: 8-4-1
- Earnings: US$3,571,418

Major wins
- Somerville Tattersall Stakes (2021); Breeders' Cup Juvenile Turf (2021); Poule d'Essai des Poulains (2022); Woodbine Mile (2022); Breeders' Cup Mile (2022); Lockinge Stakes (2023)

Awards
- American Champion Male Turf Horse (2022)
- Last updated on August 15, 2023

Modern Games (foaled 17 April 2019) is a retired champion Thoroughbred racehorse. Bred in Ireland and trained in Great Britain, he was one of the best two-year-olds in the world in 2021 when he won four of his six races including the Somerville Tattersall Stakes in England and the Breeders' Cup Juvenile Turf in the United States. As a three-year-old he was victorious in the Group 1 Poule d'Essai des Poulains and Grade I Woodbine Mile and Breeders' Cup Mile, earning him honors as Champion Turf Male of 2022. He finished his racing career with eight victories, winning five Group/Grade One events and either winning or placing in ten graded races.

== Background ==
Modern Games is a chestnut colt with a white star and three white socks bred and owned by Sheikh Mohammed's Godolphin organisation. He was sent into training with Charlie Appleby at Godolphin's British base in Newmarket, Suffolk.

He was from the twelfth crop of foals sired by Dubawi, whose wins included the Irish 2,000 Guineas and the Prix Jacques Le Marois. At stud, Dubawi has been a highly successful breeding stallion, siring major winners such as Ghaiyyath, Too Darn Hot, Al Kazeem, Makfi, Old Persian, Lucky Nine and Night of Thunder. Modern Games's dam Modern Ideals showed no racing ability but was a half-sister to the Prix Jean-Luc Lagardère winner Ultra. She was a great-granddaughter of Konafa who finished second in the 1000 Guineas and was the female-line ancestor of Bosra Sham, Hector Protector and Golden Sixty.

== Racing career ==
=== 2021: two-year-old season ===
Modern Games began his racing career in a novice race (for horses with no more than two previous wins) over a distance of about seven furlongs on good ground at Haydock Park on 1 July when he started at odds of 5/1 and came home fifth behind Mr McCann, beaten eleven lengths by the winner. Later that month he started favourite for a maiden race over the same distance at Newmarket Racecourse. Ridden as on his debut by James Doyle he was in contention from the start, took the lead approaching the last quarter mile and won "comfortably" by two lengths from the Queen's colt Saga. In his four subsequent races in 2021, Modern Games was ridden by William Buick. At Leicester Racecourse on 8 August the colt started odds-on favourite for a novice race but was beaten three quarters of a length by the previously unraced Cresta, to whom he was conceding nine pounds in weight. A month later Modern Games was assigned a weight of 131 pounds for a nursery (a handicap race for two-year-olds) over seven furlongs at Doncaster Racecourse and won "readily" by three and a half lengths from Sed Maarib after taking the lead two furlongs out.

On 23 September Modern Games was stepped up in class to contest the Group 3 Somerville Tattersall Stakes over seven furlongs at Newmarket and started 3/1 second choice in the betting behind the French-trained Trident (runner-up in the Prix Morny). Modern Games took the lead soon after the start and shook off the challenge from Trident before drawing away in the closing stages to win by two and a half lengths. After the race Appleby commented "He's not a big, imposing horse by any stretch of the imagination, but he worked particularly well on Saturday and our plan was to go and make it, and make them come at us... He's a neat, little horse... maybe we'll look at something like the Breeders' Cup because he's got natural pace and plenty of experience under his belt."

As Appleby had predicted Modern Games was sent to the United States to contest the Breeders' Cup Juvenile Turf over eight furlongs at Del Mar Racetrack on 5 November, when he was joined by his stablemate Albahr (the winner of the Summer Stakes). The other contenders included Dubawi Legend (runner-up in the Dewhurst Stakes), Glounthaune (Killavullan Stakes), Tiz The Bomb (Bourbon Stakes), Coinage (With Anticipation Stakes) and Slipstream (Belmont Futurity Stakes). As the horses were being loaded into the starting stalls Albahr reared up and fell backwards, and Modern Games in the adjacent stall was released from the front of the gate. It was announced that Modern Games had been withdrawn but after a correction he was allowed to take part, although he was treated as a non-runner for betting purposes. Modern Games settled in mid-division and was then switched to the outside as he began to make progress on the final turn. He produced a sustained run in the straight, overtook the Mark Casse-trained Grafton Street 100 yards from the finish and won "readily" by a length and a half from Tiz The Bomb. Some of the crowd booed the result as their bets on the winner had been made invalid by the events before the start. Charlie Appleby commented "We understand that people who wagered on the race or had to change their wager would be upset... the horse came into the race with a lovely profile. He was a progressive 2-year-old, and he's really pleased us since he's been here. And so we were confident coming into the race that we were going to be a big player anyway."

=== 2022: three-year-old season ===
After a 190-day break Modern Games on May 15 started his three-year-old campaign as the 2/1 favorite in the Group 1 Poule d'Essai des Poulains at Longchamp in Paris, France. Modern Games made the perfect return to action with regular jockey William Buick aboard and strongly finished past his rivals in the closing yards to defeat 66/1 longshot Texas to add another Classic success. Trainer Charlie Appleby said after the race, "I said to William go and try to make it and if someone takes it off you, then fine. He hit the stalls so quickly he almost stumbled coming out of them... He's a professional horse and I'm delighted with that performance, this was always our plan to come here. His class has shown." Appleby indicated that Modern Games would start in the French Derby in his next start bur was not sure if the horse would handle the added distance.

In the Group 1 Prix du Jockey Club (French Derby), Modern Games was made the 9/4 favorite but was no match for Vadeni finishing over 5 lengths behind the winner. Modern Games set a torrid pace but found the added distance of 2100 metres slightly beyond him and he finishing third. On 10 July Modern Games was entered in the Group 1 Prix Jean Prat at Deauville Racecourse, an event over 1400 metres (nearly 7 furlongs). Starting as the 7/4 favorite Modern Games was in the leading pair, and was poised with over 400 metres to run, kept on with the same pace final 200 metres, and was overtaken in the last 100 metres to finish fifth, about a length and a half behind Tenebrism. On 27 July Modern Games returned to England to face Baaeed in the Group 1 Sussex Stakes at Goodwood Racecourse over a mile. Modern Games was in touch with the leaders, pushed along over two furlong to run. Ridden by regular rider William Buick he pressed the leaders inside the final furlong moving into second place in the final sixteenth but was no match for undefeated Baaeed, beaten by 1 3/4 lengths.

In his next start Modern Games traveled to Canada where on September 17 he started in the Woodbine Mile. Starting at the odds of 3/4 odds-on it appeared jockey William Buick might have to work to get the favorite home. Racing well back in the 11-horse field and two wide, Modern Games took a wide swing into the stretch to find daylight. Getting the split Modern Games quickly put distance on the field, he sprinted away to win by 5 1/4 lengths in a time of 1:32.77 on firm turf course.

On November 5, Modern Games ran in the Breeders' Cup Mile at Keeneland. Starting at odds of about 11/8 favourite. Jumping awkwardly out of the starting gate Modern Games was pinched back behind horses into the run for the first turn. Jockey William Buick tucked Modern Games into path two in eighth position as 2021 Mile runner-up Smooth Like Strait assumed his customary role as front-runner, narrowly leading Irish-bred Pogo through splits of :23, :46.81, and 1:10.96. As the horses entered the straight run Modern Games bore down on the leaders from the middle of the track as Pogo took over the lead from a tiring Smooth Like Strait. By the eighth pole. Modern Games swept by a game Ivar and held sway over the late-closing 55/1 longshot Shirl's Speight and Kinross. After his three-quarter-length victory, he became the first horse to complete the Breeders' Cup Juvenile Turf–Mile double.

=== 2023: four-year-old season ===
Modern Games finished second in the Maker's Mark Mile Stakes at Keeneland before going to Newbury Racecourse, where he took his fifth Group I victory in the Lockinge Stakes. His final career start was in the Queen Anne Stakes at Royal Ascot, where he finished fourth.

== Retirement ==
On 15 August 2023, Godolphin announced that Modern Games had been retired. Stud plans for the 2024 breeding season have yet to be announced.

== Statistics ==
Date	Distance	Race	Group Grade	Track	Odds	Field	Finish	Time	Winning (Losing) Margin	Jockey	Ref
2021 – two-year-old season
1 Jul 2021	6 furlongs 212 yards	Novice Stakes		Haydock Park	5/1	10	5	1:28.53	(11 lengths)	James Doyle	
24 Jul 2021	7 furlongs	Maiden		Newmarket	5/2*	9	1	1:26.73	2 lengths	James Doyle	
8 Aug 2021	7 furlongs	Novice Stakes		Leicester	5/6*	10	2	1:24.84	(3/4 length)	William Buick	
8 Sep 2021	7 furlongs 6 yards	Handicap		Doncaster	2/1*	10	1	1:24.54	3 1/2 lengths	William Buick	
23 Sep 2021	7 furlongs	Somerville Tattersall Stakes	III	Newmarket	3/1	6	1	1:23.62	2 1/2 lengths	William Buick	
5 Nov 2021	1 mile	Breeders' Cup Juvenile Turf	I	Del Mar	n/a (Note: Modern Games was scratched at the starting gate after breaking through. Stewards reinstated him back into the field and he ran for purse money only. As such, wins bets were payable for the horse that finished second, Tiz the Bomb who started at odds of 7.90.)	13	1	1:34.72	1 1/2 lengths	William Buick	
2022 – three-year-old season
15 May 2022	1600 metres	Poule d'Essai des Poulains (Note: French 2000 Guineas – distance ~1 mile)	I	Longchamps	7/4*	15	1	1:34.98	1 3/4 lengths	William Buick	
5 Jun 2022	2100 metres	Prix du Jockey Club (Note: French Derby distance ~ 1 5/16 miles)	I	Chantilly	9/4*	15	3	2:06.65	(5 1/4 lengths)	William Buick	
10 Jul 2022	1400 metres (Note: Prix Jean Prat – distance ~ 7 furlongs)	Prix Jean Prat	I	Deauville	7/4*	11	5	1:22.91	(1 1/2 lengths)	William Buick	
27 Jul 2022	1 mile	Sussex Stakes	I	Goodwood	12/1	7	2	1:37.74	(1 3/4 lengths)	William Buick	
17 Sep 2022	1 mile	Woodbine Mile	I	Woodbine	0.75*	11	1	1:32.77	5 1/4 lengths	William Buick	
15 Oct 2022	1 mile	Queen Elizabeth II Stakes	I	Ascot	4/1	9	2	1:45.53	(1 1/4 lengths)	William Buick	
5 Nov 2022	1 mile	Breeders' Cup Mile	I	Keeneland	1.38*	14	1	1:33.96	3/4 length	William Buick	
2023 – four-year-old season
14 Apr 2023	1 mile	Maker's Mark Mile Stakes	I	Keeneland	0.45*	8	2	1:33.46	(3 1/2 lengths)	William Buick	
20 May 2023	1 mile	Lockinge Stakes	I	Newbury	3/1*	12	1	1:36.09	1 1/2 lengths	William Buick	
20 Jun 2023	1 mile	Queen Anne Stakes	I	Royal Ascot	7/4*	12	4	1:40.70	(3 1/2 lengths)	William Buick	

Legend:
Turf
Notes:
An (*) asterisk after the odds means Modern Games was the post-time favourite.

== Pedigree ==
Pedigree of Modern Games (IRE), chestnut colt, 2019
Sire Dubawi (IRE) 2002	Dubai Millennium (GB); 1996	Seeking the Gold (USA)	Mr. Prospector
Sire Dubawi (IRE) 2002	Dubai Millennium (GB); 1996	Seeking the Gold (USA)	Con Game
Sire Dubawi (IRE) 2002	Dubai Millennium (GB); 1996	Colorado Dancer (IRE)	Shareef Dancer (USA)
Sire Dubawi (IRE) 2002	Dubai Millennium (GB); 1996	Colorado Dancer (IRE)	Fall Aspen (USA)
Sire Dubawi (IRE) 2002	Zomaradah (GB); 1995	Deploy	Shirley Heights
Sire Dubawi (IRE) 2002	Zomaradah (GB); 1995	Deploy	Slightly Dangerous (USA)
Sire Dubawi (IRE) 2002	Zomaradah (GB); 1995	Jawaher (IRE)	Dancing Brave (USA)
Sire Dubawi (IRE) 2002	Zomaradah (GB); 1995	Jawaher (IRE)	High Tern
Dam Modern Ideals (GB) 2010	New Approach (IRE); 2005	Galileo	Sadler's Wells (USA)
Dam Modern Ideals (GB) 2010	New Approach (IRE); 2005	Galileo	Urban Sea (USA)
Dam Modern Ideals (GB) 2010	New Approach (IRE); 2005	Park Express	Ahonoora (GB)
Dam Modern Ideals (GB) 2010	New Approach (IRE); 2005	Park Express	Matcher (CAN)
Dam Modern Ideals (GB) 2010	Epitome (IRE); 1999	Nashwan (USA)	Blushing Groom (FR)
Dam Modern Ideals (GB) 2010	Epitome (IRE); 1999	Nashwan (USA)	Height of Fashion (FR)
Dam Modern Ideals (GB) 2010	Epitome (IRE); 1999	Proskona (USA)	Mr. Prospector
Dam Modern Ideals (GB) 2010	Epitome (IRE); 1999	Proskona (USA)	Konafa (CAN) (Family: 22-b)

- Modern Games is inbred 4 × 4 to Mr. Prospector, meaning that this stallion appears twice in the fourth generation of his pedigree.
