= Life Is Good (horse) =

American racehorse

- Sire: Into Mischief
- Grandsire: Harlan's Holiday
- Dam: Beach Walk
- Damsire: Distorted Humor
- Sex: Stallion
- Foaled: 22 April 2018
- Country: United States
- Colour: Bay
- Breeder: Gary and Mary West Stable
- Owner: China Horse Club & WinStar Farm
- Trainer: Bob Baffert (2020– March 2021); Todd A. Pletcher (June 2021– )
- Record: 12:9-1-0
- Earnings: $4,541,700

Major wins
- Sham Stakes (2021); San Felipe Stakes (2021); Kelso Handicap (2021); Pegasus World Cup (2022); John A. Nerud Stakes (2022); Whitney Stakes (2022); Woodward Stakes (2022); Breeders' Cup wins: Breeders' Cup Dirt Mile (2021)
- Last updated on 6 December 2022

Life Is Good (foaled 22 April 2018) is a multiple Grade I winning American Thoroughbred racehorse who won the 2021 Breeders' Cup Dirt Mile and 2022 Pegasus World Cup.

== Background ==
Life Is Good is a bay stallion that was bred in Kentucky by Gary and Mary West Stable. His sire is Into Mischief and his dam is Beach Walk who was sired by Distorted Humor. Life Is Good is the second foal and second winner from his dam, and her only stakes winner. The dam also has a Blame filly and a Candy Ride (ARG) colt.

Life Is Good was a $525,000 purchase from the Paramount Sales consignment at the 2019 Keeneland September Yearling Sale by China Horse Club and Maverick Racing which is the buying arm of WinStar Farm.

Initially, in his first three starts Life Is Good was trained by Bob Baffert but in the midst of his three-year-old career was transferred to Todd A. Pletcher's barn.

== Racing career ==
=== 2020: Two-year-old season ===
Life Is Good began his career on November 22 at Del Mar Racetrack in a Maiden Special Weight for two-year-olds at six and 1/2 furlongs. Starting at very short odds of 1/5on against four other horses, Life Is Good jumped out alertly from the inside stall and immediately got the lead. He led throughout the race with jockey Mike Smith and drew off and was ridden out to the wire to win easily by 9 1/2 lengths in a time of 1:15.50.

=== 2021: Three-year-old season ===
Life Is Good made his first start as a three-year-old in the Sham Stakes at Santa Anita Park on January 2. Installed as the 1/5 favorite in the five-horse field, he went to the early lead and set sensible fractions while maintaining an advantage of three to four lengths down the backstretch and into the stretch. Stablemate Medina Spirit, second throughout, made a late run to close to within three-quarters of a length, with the third-place finisher 13 lengths further back. Jockey Mike E. Smith's commented, "It was his first time around two turns. He got away just a little slow, but he got up and of course he's naturally so quick, he was just up underneath himself. Just as we were heading for home, he was doing things all by himself so easy out there."

Life Is Good made his next start in the San Felipe Stakes on March 6. Again he was the favorite, at 1/2, and he went to the early lead and was never challenged although drifting in the stretch run, winning by eight lengths over Medina Spirit with Dream Shake third. After the race, Baffert said, "He's still green. They do all that weaving one race ... they're still babies. They're still immature. The main thing is he came out of it really well. We saw a lot of raw talent yesterday." After the event, Life Is Good had collected 60 qualification points for the Road to the Kentucky Derby and was second in the standings.

After a workout on March 20, an examination followed and it was found that Life Is Good had an apparent hind-end injury. On 26 March, he underwent surgery for the removal of a small chip in his left hind ankle. Baffert said, "He couldn't have worked more beautifully. It was a great, nice cruising work like he usually does. He's so light on his feet. He came back (to the barn), the rider said he felt great ... Then all of a sudden later in the morning, you could tell something was bothering him in the hind leg." Life Is Good was to have been pointed to the Santa Anita Derby but those plans and the Triple Crown events were abandoned.

With the ramifications of Baffert being suspended in Kentucky and in New York by NYRA due to Medina Spirit's positive drug test after finishing first in the 2021 Kentucky Derby, connections of Life Is Good moved him to Todd A. Pletcher. On June 24, he had his first workout at Keeneland after the successful operation.

In his first start for Todd A. Pletcher, Life Is Good was entered in the Grade I H. Allen Jerkens Memorial Stakes at Saratoga Race Course. In this sprint race for three-year-olds, he clashed with sprinting sensation Jackie's Warrior who was coming off a win in the Amsterdam Stakes. From the widest barrier, number 6, Life Is Good, burst away to a two-length lead over Jackie's Warrior after a half-mile in :44.16. As they entered the straight, Jackie's Warrior cut into the margin and forged to the lead by about a half a length before jockey Mike E. Smith pressured Life Is Good. The latter cut into the margin but was beaten by a neck on the line in a time of 1:21.39 on a fast track. Todd A. Pletcher after the event was very pleased, commenting, "He ran super. Running 1:21 and 1 off a layoff. It was a big effort."

In his next start on September 25 at Belmont Park in the Grade II Kelso Handicap. Life Is Good faced three older horses. Ridden by Irad Ortiz Jr. for the first time and starting at odds of 1/20, he had little trouble handling his first-time older opponents as he breezed to a 5 1/2 lengths victory. Ortiz commented after the race, "He did it very easily. When I asked him, he just took off."

In his last start of the year, Life Is Good was shipped back to the West Coast for the Breeders' Cup, which was held at Del Mar Racetrack. Originally, it was hoped that he would run in the Breeders' Cup Classic, but since he lost time during the season with injury and recovery from an operation his connections decided that the Breeders' Cup Dirt Mile was a better spot. Life Is Good, starting as the 7/10 favorite, bounced out in front, leading his elder rivals by 1 length. He turned back his main challenger, Ginobili, to win by 5 3/4 lengths in a time of 1:34.12. Accolades were given from owners; Elliott Walden, CEO, president, and racing manager of WinStar Farm; and trainer Todd Pletcher, describing the performance as "An exceptional talent!"

=== 2022: Four-year-old season ===
Life Is Good started the year with a 3 1/4 lengths win over champion Knicks Go in the Pegasus World Cup on January 29 at Gulfstream Park. Todd Pletcher's reaction after the race was, "I can't think of a horse (I trained) better than him. He's extra special. He has that unique ability to go fast and just keep going." Elliott Walden, president, CEO, and racing manager of owner Kenny Troutt's WinStar Farm, noted, “We've seen him train in the morning and he never gets tired, so when he was as far in front as he was, we knew he was not going to stop."

Connections indicated that Life Is Good would be pointed to the Dubai World Cup at Meydan Racecourse in Dubai on March 26. Pletcher indicated that they were in no rush to make a decision and felt that the horse was talented enough to do just about anything, including getting a mile and a quarter. Life Is Good flew to Dubai on 14 March 2022. He was made the 8/13 favourite by British bookmakers and went to the front. But down the stretch, he was collared and weakened with 50 yards to go, finishing fourth to Country Grammer, beaten by 2 1/4 lengths.

On 2 July, Life Is Good was entered in the Grade II John A. Nerud Stakes at Belmont Park. He was pushed by the grade 1-winning Speaker's Corner through quick fractions of :22.19, :44.70, and 1:08.83 but pulled away to score by five lengths over that rival in 1:21.70 for the seven furlongs. Starting as the 1-5 favorite, Life Is Good with jockey Flavien Prat quickly grabbed the lead from the rail with Speaker's Corner stalking but beginning to drop back after a half-mile.

Five weeks later, Life Is Good returned to Saratoga Race Course on a day when a crowd of 39,478 turned out to witness the Grade I Whitney Stakes. The race began with jockey Irad Ortiz Jr. using Life Is Good's sharp early speed to break from the gate quickly and open a clear lead by the time the field reached the first turn in the 1 1/8 miles test. Life Is Good led by 3 1/2 lengths over third-choice Hot Rod Charlie and was still ahead by two lengths after six furlongs in a quick 1:10.93. Happy Saver and Hot Rod Charlie took runs at him in early stretch, but Ortiz angled Life Is Good to the inside toward Happy Saver in midstretch and won by two lengths in 1:48.97 as the 4/5 odds-of favorite.

On October 1, a small field with was declared for the Grade I Woodward Stakes at Aqueduct Racetrack. Breaking from the rail, where there were some puddles of water on the sloppy, sealed track from 0.74 inches of rainfall, Life Is Good broke quickly and moved out a couple of paths. The fractions were comfortable as he reeled off splits of :24.40, and :48.60. On the final turn, Law Professor moved alongside Life Is Good, but in the stretch under urging, the latter moved away to open a lead of 1 1/2 lengths in mid-stretch and stayed on top while covering the 1 1/8 miles in 1:49.57 as the 1/20 odds-on favorite.

In his last career start, Life Is Good finished fifth after leading into the straight to Flightline in the 2022 Breeders' Cup Classic at Keeneland Racecourse. According to Equibase, Life Is Good laid down early fractions as impressive as Flightline's final time. His opening quarter of :22.55, half-mile in :45.47, and six furlongs in 1:09.62 were the fastest among 51 races at 10 furlongs run at Keeneland since 1991.

== Statistics ==
Date	Distance	Race	Grade	Track	Odds	Field	Finish	Winning Time	Winning (Losing) Margin	Jockey	Ref
2020 – Two-year-old season
Nov 22, 2020	6 1/2 furlongs	Maiden		Del Mar	0.20*	5	1	1:15.50	9 1/2 lengths	Mike E. Smith	
2021 – Three-year-old season
Jan 2, 2021	1 mile	Sham Stakes	III	Santa Anita	0.20*	5	1	1:36.63	3/4 length	Mike E. Smith	
Mar 6, 2021	1 1/16 miles	San Felipe Stakes	II	Santa Anita	0.50*	7	1	1:42.18	8 lengths	Mike E. Smith	
Aug 28, 2021	7 furlongs	H. Allen Jerkens Memorial	I	Saratoga	0.95*	6	2	1:21.39	(neck)	Mike E. Smith	
Sep 25, 2021	1 mile	Kelso Handicap	II	Belmont Park	0.05*	4	1	1:34.37	5 1/2 lengths	Irad Ortiz Jr.	
Nov 6, 2021	1 mile	Breeders' Cup Dirt Mile	I	Del Mar	0.70*	8	1	1:34.12	5 3/4 lengths	Irad Ortiz Jr.	
2022 – Four-year-old season
Jan 29, 2022	1 1/8 miles	Pegasus World Cup	I	Gulfstream Park	0.80*	9	1	1:48.91	3 1/4 lengths	Irad Ortiz Jr.	
Mar 26, 2022	2000 metres (Note: Distance for the event was approximately 1 1/4 miles)	Dubai World Cup	I	Meydan (UAE)	0.61* (Note: Life Is Good final odds with British Bookmakers were 8/13 odds-on since gambling is prohibited in the United Arab Emirates)	10	4	2:04.97	(2 1/4 lengths)	Irad Ortiz Jr.	
Jul 2, 2022	7 furlongs	John A. Nerud Stakes	II	Belmont Park	0.20*	4	1	1:21.70	5 lengths	Flavien Prat	
Aug 6, 2022	1 1/8 miles	Whitney Stakes	I	Saratoga	0.85*	5	1	1:48.97	2 lengths	Irad Ortiz Jr.	
Oct 1, 2022	1 1/8 miles	Woodward Stakes	I	Aqueduct	0.05*	4	1	1:49.57	1 1/4 lengths	Irad Ortiz Jr.	
Nov 5, 2022	1 1/4 miles	Breeders' Cup Classic	I	Keeneland	8.81	8	5	2:00.05	(12 1/2 lengths)	Irad Ortiz Jr.	

Notes:
An (*) asterisk after the odds means Life Is Good was the post-time favorite.

== Stud career ==
It was announced after the Breeders' Cup that upon his retirement from racing, Life Is Good would take up stallion duties at WinStar Farm in 2023. He will be standing for $100,000 in his initial season.

=== Notable progeny ===
c = colt, f = filly, g = gelding

Foaled	Name	Sex	Major wins
2024	The Good Life	c	Hopeful Stakes

== Pedigree ==
Pedigree of Life Is Good, bay colt, 22 April 2018
Sire Into Mischief 2005	Harlan's Holiday; 1999	Harlan; 1989	Storm Cat 1983
Sire Into Mischief 2005	Harlan's Holiday; 1999	Harlan; 1989	Country Romance 1976
Sire Into Mischief 2005	Harlan's Holiday; 1999	Christmas in Aiken; 1992	Affirmed 1975
Sire Into Mischief 2005	Harlan's Holiday; 1999	Christmas in Aiken; 1992	Dowager 1980
Sire Into Mischief 2005	Leslie's Lady; 1996	Tricky Creek; 1986	Clever Trick 1976
Sire Into Mischief 2005	Leslie's Lady; 1996	Tricky Creek; 1986	Battle Creek Girl 1977
Sire Into Mischief 2005	Leslie's Lady; 1996	Crystal Lady; 1990	Stop The Music 1970
Sire Into Mischief 2005	Leslie's Lady; 1996	Crystal Lady; 1990	One Last Bird 1980
Dam Beach Walk 2013	Distorted Humor; 1993	Forty Niner; 1985	Mr. Prospector 1970
Dam Beach Walk 2013	Distorted Humor; 1993	Forty Niner; 1985	File 1976
Dam Beach Walk 2013	Distorted Humor; 1993	Danzig's Beauty; 1987	Danzig 1977
Dam Beach Walk 2013	Distorted Humor; 1993	Danzig's Beauty; 1987	Sweetest Chant 1978
Dam Beach Walk 2013	Bonnie Blue Flag; 2007	Mineshaft; 1999	A.P. Indy 1989
Dam Beach Walk 2013	Bonnie Blue Flag; 2007	Mineshaft; 1999	Prospectors Delite 1989
Dam Beach Walk 2013	Bonnie Blue Flag; 2007	Tap Your Feet; 1998	Dixieland Band 1980
Dam Beach Walk 2013	Bonnie Blue Flag; 2007	Tap Your Feet; 1998	Exotic Moves 1991 (family 13-c)
