= Flightline (horse) =

American racehorse

- Sire: Tapit
- Grandsire: Pulpit
- Dam: Feathered
- Damsire: Indian Charlie
- Sex: Stallion
- Foaled: March 14, 2018
- Country: United States
- Colour: Bay
- Breeder: Summer Wind Equine
- Owner: Hronis Racing, Siena Farm, Summer Wind Equine, West Point Thoroughbreds & Woodford Racing
- Trainer: John W. Sadler
- Record: 6: 6-0-0
- Earnings: US$4,514,800

Major wins
- Malibu Stakes (2021); Metropolitan Handicap (2022); Pacific Classic Stakes (2022) Breeders' Cup wins Breeders' Cup Classic (2022)

Awards
- IFHA World's Best Racehorse (2022); Timeform rating: 143; American Champion Older Dirt Male Horse (2022); American Horse of the Year (2022)
- Last updated on January 26, 2023

Flightline (foaled March 14, 2018) is an American Thoroughbred racehorse who retired undefeated after six starts, including the 2021 Malibu Stakes and the Metropolitan Handicap, Pacific Classic and Breeders' Cup Classic in 2022. In the January 2023 World's Best Racehorse Rankings, he was given a rating of 140, the highest ever awarded to a runner on the dirt. He was named the 2022 American Horse of the Year and Champion Older Horse.

== Background ==
Flightline is a bay stallion who was bred in Kentucky by Summer Wind Equine. His sire is Tapit, who was the leading sire in North America in 2014, 2015, and 2016. Tapit is known as a source of stamina, having sired Belmont Stakes winners Tonalist, Creator, Tapwrit, and Essential Quality, and tends to pass on a "strong-willed disposition". Flightline's dam, Feathered, is a graded-stakes winning daughter of Indian Charlie. Flightline was bought for $1,000,000 by Hronis Racing (Kosta Hronis), Siena Farm, Summer Wind Equine, West Point Thoroughbreds & Woodford Racing at the 2019 Fasig-Tipton Yearling Sale in Saratoga. Flightline was trained by John W. Sadler, and his jockey was Flavien Prat.

Sadler called Flightline "a gorgeous looking horse" – well-proportioned, powerful and correct. "He's very bright," he said. "He's a very awake horse so we try to manage that. He will stand on the racetrack with the pony before he goes off and gallops. He's pretty good in the stall, but if there is a large bang, look out!"

Hronis credited Sadler and his team for their patience with the colt, allowing him time to develop. "He was a fast horse all the time and wanted to run full-blast all the time," said Hronis. "John and (exercise rider) Juan Leyva, and the rest of the team – they turned him into a racehorse and he's the champion he is today because of John."

Flightline had a series of small accidents as a younger horse. The most serious incident happened at age two, when he was startled while being saddled for a training session. He hit himself on a stall latch, leaving an L-shaped scar on his right hip near the tail. He also has white spots on his neck where a port was placed for antibiotics during recovery. This injury prevented him from racing as a two-year-old. He later suffered a hoof crack that interrupted his three-year-old season and then a strained hock that delayed the start of his four-year-old campaign. Sadler later joked, "I like to say he only loses to inanimate objects, a door latch, a wall."

== Racing career ==
=== 2021: Three-year-old season ===
Flightline began his career on April 24, 2021, at Santa Anita Park in a maiden race for three-year-olds and up over six furlongs. Facing six other non-winners, he went off as the 9-10 favorite. He bumped with one of the other entrants at the start but kicked clear and then extended his lead around the turn to win by 13 1/2 lengths in a time of 1:08.75. He earned a Beyer Speed Figure of 105 and was named a TDN Rising Star by The Thoroughbred Daily News. "We really thought the world of him, but you never really know until they get on the racetrack," Hronis said. "He makes it look really easy and he kind of floats over the track. He does things effortlessly."

Flightline's second start was delayed for several months due to a foot bruise. On September 5, he was entered in an allowance race for non-winners of two races at Del Mar over a distance of six furlongs. Flightline pressed the pace from outside, went to the lead midway around the turn, and opened up under mild persuasion by Prat. He pushed away in the straight, coasting to the finishing line in the last 100 yards to win by 12 3/4 lengths in a time of 1:08.05. He earned a Beyer Speed Figure of 114.

For his final start of the year, Flightline ran in the Grade I Malibu Stakes at Santa Anita Park on December 26 over seven furlongs. Facing six other sophomores, he started as the 2-5 favorite. He was bumped at the start by second choice Dr. Schivel while starting slowly. However, Prat urged Flightline to the lead after a quarter-mile, leading clearly around the turn and drawing away in deep stretch to win by 11 1/2 lengths in a time of 1:21.37. Prat said, "I was in cruise control the whole race, galloping freely. I wanted to get a good position and get myself into the race." Flightline was awarded a Beyer Speed Figure of 118, the highest number earned by any horse racing on dirt in North America in 2021.

=== 2022: Four-year-old season ===
Flightline was expected to begin his four-year-old season in March 2022 but suffered a minor issue to his hock, causing another setback. He returned on June 11 in the prestigious Metropolitan Handicap at Belmont Park in his first trip outside California. Sadler was not concerned about stretching the horse out to a distance of a mile, noting that Flightline had been full of run at the finish of each of his starts. He went off as the 2-5 favorite in a field of five that included Speaker's Corner (Carter Handicap) and Aloha West (Breeders' Cup Sprint). He broke slowly and tried to rush up beside Speaker's Corner before Prat got him to settle. He then rated for the first half-mile before moving to the outside and taking the lead around the five-sixteenths pole. He won by six lengths, completing the one-turn mile in 1:33.59 on a fast track. Sadler commented, "For a young horse who has not had that much seasoning, he just overcame the adversity and proved himself best. He overcame trouble; that's the storyline."

Flightline made his next start in the Pacific Classic at Del Mar on September 3, stretching out to 10 furlongs for the first time. Although some were concerned about potential stamina issues, he went off as the heavy 3-10 favorite in a field of six that included Dubai World Cup winner Country Grammer. He was bumped on both sides while leaving the starting gate but quickly settled into stride, pressing the early pace set by Extra Hope. He raced three to four wide around the first turn while settling into second place, then moved to the lead down the backstretch. Running freely, Flightline continued to open up, winning by 19 1/4 lengths over Country Grammer. His time of 1:59.28 was 0.17 of a second off the track record. "He's such a special horse," said Sadler. "You assume horses with speed can't carry it [over a distance]. But this is an exceptional horse. He has speed and keeps going."

"When we went into the final turn, he was traveling so well I asked him to pick it up a little bit," said Prat. "As soon as I looked back and saw how far in front he was, I wrapped up on him. Obviously, this is the best horse I ever rode."

The performance drew superlatives from racing journalists and comparisons to past greats such as Secretariat. Flightline was assigned a Beyer Speed Figure of 126, tied for the second highest assigned (with Will's Way, Gentlemen and Formal Gold) since the Daily Racing Form began publishing the numbers in 1992 (Ghostzapper earned a rating of 128 in 2004). The record for the highest Beyer Speed figure assigned before the numbers were published in the Daily Racing Form is held by Groovy, who earned 133 and 132 speed figures in back-to-back races in 1987. In the World's Best Racehorse Rankings (WBRR) published on September 15, Flightline's run in the Pacific Classic was ranked the top performance of the year with a rating of 139, the second-highest rating the organization has ever assigned (Frankel has the highest rating WBRR at 140). Flightline's rating is the highest ever assigned by the WBRR to a horse running on the dirt, topping Cigar's rating of 135.

==== Breeders' Cup Classic ====
Flightline finished his career with a victory in the $6 million Breeders' Cup Classic on November 5 at Keeneland. The field included seven Grade I winners, with Flightline went the 2-5 favorite. He chased the 2021 Breeders' Cup Dirt Mile winner Life Is Good for most of the race, with the rest of the field far behind. Flightline began to close in around the far turn, taking the lead at the top of the stretch. His 8 1/4-length victory was the largest winning margin in the history of the race, surpassing the 6 1/2-length victories of Volponi in 2002 and American Pharoah in 2015. "He would have been the favorite in the Dirt Mile, the Classic, the Sprint, maybe a turf race today," said Sadler. "He's America's horse. He's done everything possible. He's stepped up to every challenge." He echoed Bud Delp, the late trainer of the great Spectacular Bid, in saying that Flightline was "one of the best horses to ever look through a bridle."

Other trainers echoed the sentiment. "You just don’t see that," said Bill Mott, who trained the runner-up Olympiad. "He's comparable to any of the great ones I've seen. Very, very special." "That's a freakish, freakish horse,” said Doug O’Neill, who trained sixth-placed Hot Rod Charlie. "Just amazing. I haven’t seen a better one in my lifetime." Bob Baffert said that Flightline had accomplished what American Pharoah would have done if he'd raced as a four-year-old. "They’re in a different area code," said Baffert. "They're superior horses. It's God's gift of just true natural talent. Like Usain Bolt. They don't come around very often." Flightline earned a 121 Beyer Speed Figure for this Breeders' Cup Classic win, which ranks as the third fastest Beyer Speed Figure run in any Breeders' Cup Classic behind the 1989 Classic in which both Sunday Silence and Easy Goer ran 124 speed figures, which tied for the fastest speed figure earned in any Breeders' Cup race along with the 124 run by Ghostzapper (2004 Classic).

The connections of Life Is Good said that they had decided to make Flightline "earn it" by going to the lead and setting a fast pace. "I felt [Flightline] every step of the way, just tried to get away from him and I couldn't," said Life Is Good's jockey, Irad Ortiz, Jr. "I know I'm going fast and I said let me look again down the backside and he’s there. I said 'Oh, my God.' Then he just goes by me like nothing. He's an unbelievable horse."

Flightline was named the 2022 American Horse of the Year and earned the Eclipse Award for Champion Older Male Dirt Horse. He was also named the World's Best Racehorse of 2022, ranked five pounds higher than Baaeed, establishing him as the greatest horse alive. His final rating of 140 ranked equal with Frankel as the highest ever awarded by the International Federation of Horseracing Authorities. The Breeders' Cup Classic was also the top-ranked race of 2022.

== Statistics ==
Date	Distance	Race	Grade	Track	Odds	Field	Finish	Winning Time	Winning (Losing) Margin	Beyer Speed Figure	Jockey	Ref
Apr 24, 2021	6 furlongs	Maiden		Santa Anita	0.90*	7	1	1:08.75	13 1/4 lengths	105	Flavien Prat	
Sep 5, 2021	6 furlongs	Allowance		Del Mar	0.20*	6	1	1:08.05	12 3/4 lengths	114	Flavien Prat	
Dec 26, 2021	7 furlongs	Malibu Stakes	I	Santa Anita	0.40*	7	1	1:21.37	11 1/2 lengths	118	Flavien Prat	
Jun 11, 2022	1 mile	Metropolitan Handicap	I	Belmont Park	0.45*	5	1	1:33.59	6 lengths	112	Flavien Prat	
Sep 3, 2022	1 1/4 miles	Pacific Classic Stakes	I	Del Mar	0.30*	6	1	1:59.28	19 1/4 lengths	126	Flavien Prat	
Nov 5, 2022	1 1/4 miles	Breeders' Cup Classic	I	Keeneland	0.44*	8	1	2:00.05	8 1/4 lengths	121	Flavien Prat	

Notes:
An (*) asterisk after the odds means Flightline was the post-time favorite.

== Stud career ==
In September 2022 William S. Farish's Lane's End Farm in Kentucky announced that Flightline would stand at Lane's End as the property of a syndicate upon the conclusion of his racing career. Lane's End had consigned Flightline as a yearling at the 2019 Fasig-Tipton Saratoga Sale.

Lane’s End announced Flightline’s retirement on November 6, 2022—the day after he won the Breeders’ Cup Classic. His stud fee for the 2023 breeding season was set at $200,000, the highest stud fee for a stallion's inaugural breeding season since American Pharoah's in 2016. Flightline served 152 mares in his first season.

Prior to the Breeders' Cup Classic, Lane's End and Keeneland announced that a 2.5% ownership stake in Flightline would be auctioned off on November 7 ahead of the Keeneland November Breeding Stock Sale, with the winning bidder receiving access to future breeding seasons and a share in the horse's breeding revenue. Agent Fred Seitz, owner of Brookdale Farm in Versailles, Kentucky, placed the winning bid of $4.6 million on behalf of a client who did not wish to be publicly identified at the time. The selling price of the stake put Flightline's value at $184 million, a figure that did not consider the fact that the shares of the racing syndicate were converted into a breeding syndicate after the horse's retirement.

The fee for Flightline in 2024 was lowered to $150,000, and remained the same in 2025. His 2026 stud fee was $125,000.

Flightline's first stakes winner was his daughter Go For Launch (out of 2019 Canadian Horse of the Year Starship Jubilee), who won the Bolton Landing Stakes at Saratoga Race Course in August 2026.

On September 5, 2026, Flightline sired his first graded stakes winner when Shonan Galleon won the Grade 3 Sapporo Nisai Stakes by six lengths at Sapporo Racecourse.

== Pedigree ==
Pedigree of Flightline, bay colt, March 14, 2018
Sire Tapit 2001	Pulpit; 1994	A.P. Indy; 1989	Seattle Slew 1974
Sire Tapit 2001	Pulpit; 1994	A.P. Indy; 1989	Weekend Surprise 1980
Sire Tapit 2001	Pulpit; 1994	Preach; 1989	Mr. Prospector 1970
Sire Tapit 2001	Pulpit; 1994	Preach; 1989	Narrate 1980
Sire Tapit 2001	Tap Your Heels; 1996	Unbridled; 1987	Fappiano 1977
Sire Tapit 2001	Tap Your Heels; 1996	Unbridled; 1987	Gana Facil 1981
Sire Tapit 2001	Tap Your Heels; 1996	Ruby Slippers; 1982	Nijinsky II (CAN) 1967
Sire Tapit 2001	Tap Your Heels; 1996	Ruby Slippers; 1982	Moon Glitter 1972
Dam Feathered 2012	Indian Charlie; 1995	In Excess (IRE); 1987	Siberian Express 1981
Dam Feathered 2012	Indian Charlie; 1995	In Excess (IRE); 1987	Kantado (IRE) 1976
Dam Feathered 2012	Indian Charlie; 1995	Soviet Sojourn; 1989	Leo Castelli 1981
Dam Feathered 2012	Indian Charlie; 1995	Soviet Sojourn; 1989	Political Parfait 1984
Dam Feathered 2012	Receipt; 2005	Dynaformer; 1985	Roberto 1969
Dam Feathered 2012	Receipt; 2005	Dynaformer; 1985	Andover Way 1978
Dam Feathered 2012	Receipt; 2005	Finder's Fee; 1997	Storm Cat 1983
Dam Feathered 2012	Receipt; 2005	Finder's Fee; 1997	Fantastic Find 1986 (family 20-b)
