= Breeders' Cup Juvenile Turf top three finishers =

This is a listing of the horses that finished in either first, second, or third place and the number of starters in the Breeders' Cup Juvenile Turf, a grade two race run on grass on Friday of the Breeders' Cup World Thoroughbred Championships. The race was upgraded to GI status from 2011.

Year	Winner	Second	Third	Starters
2026	Haffner	Folsom Blues	Avec Toi	12
2025	Gstaad	Stark Contrast	North Coast	14
2024	Henri Matisse (IRE)	Iron Man Cal	Aomori City	12
2023	Unquestionable (FR)	Mountain Bear	My Boy Prince	14
2022	Victoria Road (IRE)	Silver Knott	Nagirroc	14
2021	Modern Games (IRE)	Tiz The Bomb	Mackinnon	13
2020	Fire At Will	Battleground	Outadore	14
2019	Structor	Billy Batts	Gear Jockey	14
2018	Line of Duty	Uncle Benny	Somelikeithotbrown	14
2017	Mendelssohn	Untamed Domain	Voting Control	14
2016	Oscar Performance	Lancaster Bomber	Good Samaritan	14
2015	Hit It A Bomb	Airoforce	Birchwood	14
2014	Hootenanny	Luck Of The Kitten	Daddy D T	14
2013	Outstrip (IRE)	Giovanni Boldini	Bobby's Kitten	13
2012	George Vancouver	Noble Tune	Balance the Books	14
2011	Wrote	Excaper	Farraaj	14
2010	Pluck	Soldat	Willcox Inn	12
2009	Pounced	Bridgetown	Interactif	12
2008	Donativum	Westphalia	Coronet of a Baron	12
2007	Nownownow	Achill Island	Cannonball	11
