= 2009 Breeders' Cup =

Thoroughbred horse racing event

- Class: Championship Event Series
- Location: Santa Anita Racetrack
- Race type: Thoroughbred
- Website: www.breederscup.com

Race information
- Distance: See individual races
- Surface: Turf, synthetic dirt
- Track: Left-handed
- Purse: Varies by race; Between $1,000,000 – $5 million

The 2009 Breeders' Cup World Championships were the 26th edition of thoroughbred racing's season ending premier event, and took place on November 6 and 7 during the Oak Tree meeting at Santa Anita Park in Arcadia, California. The event was telecast by ESPN. The Breeders' Cup is generally regarded as the end of the North America racing season, although a few Grade I events take place in later November and December.

The highlight of the weekend was Zenyatta's victory in the Breeders' Cup Classic, marking the first time a female horse had won the race. Horses from Europe and California won the majority of races.

== Highlights ==
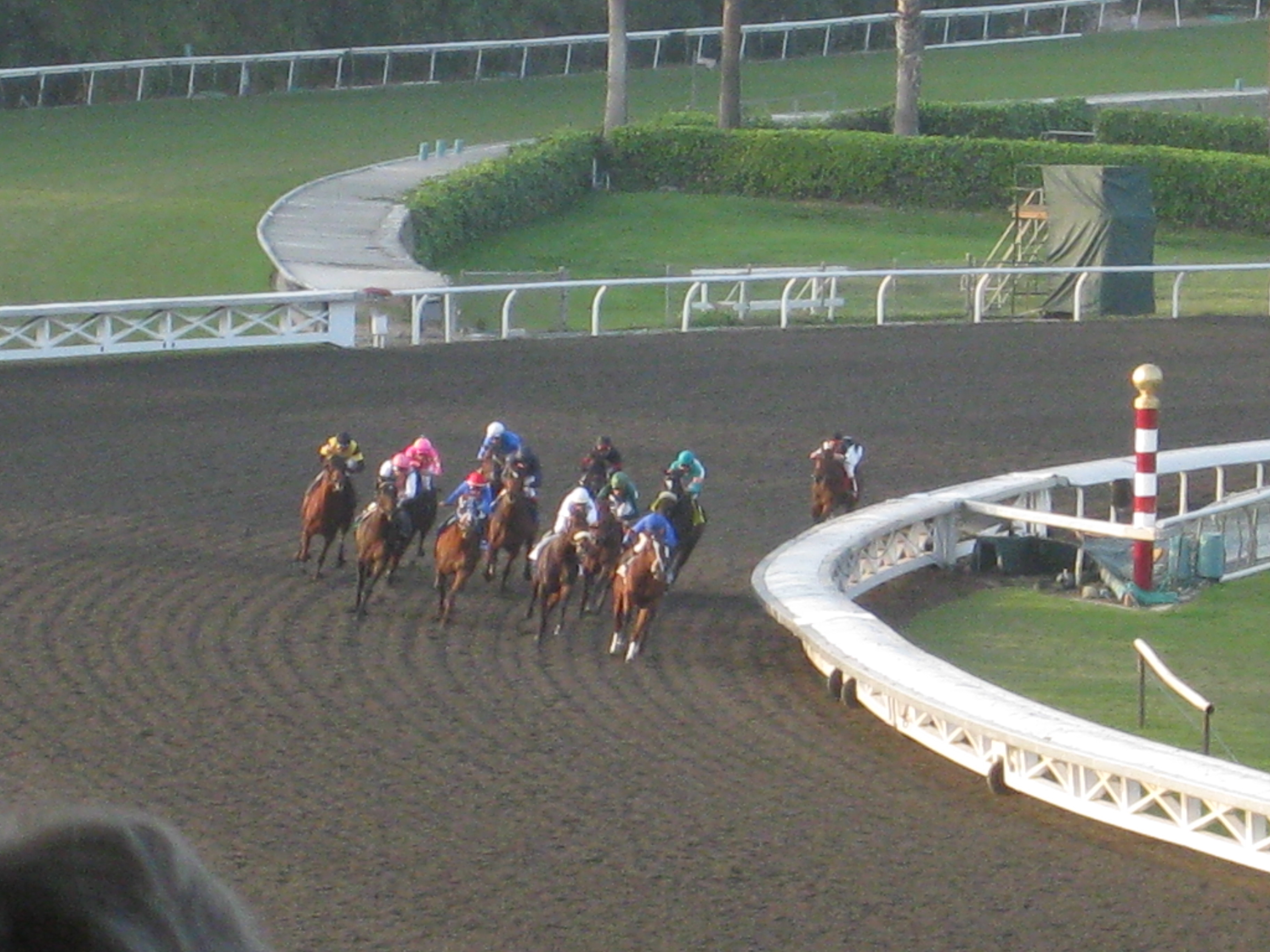
Zenyatta (turquoise cap) saves ground around the far turn

The Breeders' Cup Classic was the most anticipated race of the 2009 event, especially because of the decision by the connections of mare Zenyatta to enter her against male horses in the race instead of attempting to defend her title in the Ladies Classic (a.k.a. the Distaff). Zenyatta would face eight grade/group I-winning males, including horses who had won the Kentucky Derby, Belmont Stakes, Travers Stakes (in both 2008 and 2009), Jockey Club Gold Cup, Santa Anita Handicap, Pacific Classic, Arlington Million, Man o’ War, Champion Stakes, Queen Elizabeth II Stakes, Sussex Stakes, and Manhattan Handicap. Zenyatta ran in last for most of the race then starting making up ground on the far turn, racing on the inside to save ground. When her path along the rail was blocked, she angled sharply to switch paths to the outside, then started closing again, eventually defeating Gio Ponti by a length. She became the first female to win the Classic in its 26-year history. "I was able to cut the corner with her off the turn, and that made the difference," said jockey Mike Smith. "She started to get to them in the stretch, and the crowd started screaming. Then she started looking at the crowd, so I had to get after her a little bit, but she still won within herself."

European horses enjoyed success with two wins on Friday (Midday in the Filly & Mare Turf and Man of Iron in the Marathon), followed by four wins on Saturday (Pounced in the Juvenile Turf, Vale of York in the Juvenile, Goldikova in the Mile, Conduit in the Turf). California-based horses won several of the remaining races, including Zenyatta in the Classic, her stablemate Life Is Sweet in the Ladies Classic, California Flag in the Turf Sprint and Dancing in Silks in the Sprint. The relatively poor showing by horses from the East Coast was attributed by some to the synthetic dirt surface of the main track, with which horses from the East Coast had little experience. Noted turf writer Andrew Beyer wrote, "If the Breeders' Cup is a championship race, it's the championship of California, Britain and a few scattered tracks that have installed synthetic surfaces. But it is not a championship event in the way its creators intended."

The total handle (amount bet) at the Breeders' Cup exceeded $150 million for the first time, up by over 4% from 2008. In addition, an estimated $24.75 million was wagered through Betfair. There was one winning Pick-6 ticket on the Saturday card, which paid $1,838,305. The television ratings on ESPN were also up, particularly for the segment covering the Classic, which increased from a 1.1 rating in 2008 to a 3.1 in 2009.

== Friday ==
The Friday attendance was 37,651.

Race name	Sponsor	Distance/Surface	Conditions	Purse	Winner
Marathon		1 3/4 miles (2.8 km) – synthetic dirt	3 yrs+	$500,000	Man of Iron
Juvenile Fillies Turf		1 mile – turf	2-year-old fillies	$1 million	Tapitsfly
Juvenile Fillies	Grey Goose	1 1/16 miles (1.7 km) – synthetic dirt	2-year-old fillies	$2 million	She Be Wild
Filly & Mare Turf	Emirates	1 1/4 miles (2.0 km) – turf	Females	$2 million	Midday
Filly & Mare Sprint	Sentient Jet	7/8 mile (1.4 km) – turf	Females	$1 million	Informed Decision
Ladies' Classic		1 1/8 miles (1.8 km) – synthetic dirt	Females 3 yrs+	$2 million	Life Is Sweet

== Saturday ==
The Saturday attendance was 58,825.

Race name	Sponsor	Distance/Surface	Conditions	Purse	Winner
Juvenile Turf		1 mile – turf	2-year-old males	$1 million	Pounced
Turf Sprint		about 13/16 mile (1.3 km) – turf	3 yrs+	$1 million	California Flag
Sprint	Sentient Jet	3/4 mile (1.2 km) – synthetic dirt	3 yrs+	$2 million	Dancing in Silks
Juvenile	Grey Goose	1 1/16 miles (1.7 km) – synthetic dirt	2-year-old males	$2 million	Vale of York
Mile	TVG Network	1 mile – turf	3 yrs+	$2 million	Goldikova
Dirt Mile		1 mile – synthetic dirt	3 yrs+	$1 million	Furthest Land
Turf	Emirates	1 1/2 miles (2.4 km) – turf	3 yrs+	$3 million	Conduit
Classic		1 1/4 miles (2.0 km) – synthetic dirt	3 yrs+	$5 million	Zenyatta
