= 2026 Breeders' Cup =

- Class: Championship Event Series
- Location: Keeneland, Lexington, Kentucky
- Race type: Thoroughbred
- Website: www.breederscup.com

Race information
- Distance: See individual races
- Surface: Turf, Dirt
- Purse: Varies by race; from $1 million to $7 million

The 2026 Breeders' Cup World Championships was the 43rd edition of the premier event of the North American Thoroughbred horse racing year. The 14 races, all of which are Grade I ranked, took place on October 30 and 31 at Keeneland Race Course in Lexington, Kentucky.

The Breeders' Cup is generally regarded as the end of the North American racing season, although a few Grade I events take place in later November and December. The results heavily influence championship voting in many of the Eclipse Award divisions.

== Races ==
=== Friday, October 30 ===
Race name	Post time (EDT)	Sponsor	Distance	Restrictions	Purse	Winner (Bred)	Odds	Margin
Juvenile Turf Sprint	2:55 pm		5 1/2 furlongs	2-year-olds	$1 million	Libertango (IRE)	1.87	1 1/4 lengths
Juvenile Fillies	3:35 pm		1 1/16 miles	2-year-old fillies	$2 million	Emphatic	2.96	1 1/2 lengths
Juvenile Fillies Turf	4:15 pm	John Deere	1 mile	2-year-old fillies	$1 million	Sun Goddess (IRE)	0.85	3 lengths
Juvenile	4:55 pm	FanDuel	1 1/16 miles	2-year-old colts and geldings	$2 million	Hughes	0.82	2 1/4 lengths
Juvenile Turf	5:35 pm	Brown Advisory	1 mile	2-year-old colts and geldings	$1 million	Haffner	3.73	1 3/4 lengths

Legend:
Dirt Turf

=== Saturday, October 31 ===
Race name	Post time (EDT)	Sponsor	Distance	Restrictions	Purse	Winner (Bred)	Odds	Margin
Filly & Mare Sprint	1:10 pm		7 furlongs	3 yrs+ fillies & mares	$1 million	Ways and Means	1.07	6 1/4 lengths
Turf Sprint	1:48 pm	Prevagen	5 1/2 furlongs	3 yrs+	$1 million	Bacio	2.18	2 lengths
Dirt Mile	2:26 pm		1 mile	3 yrs+	$1 million	Further Ado	1.01	nose
Filly & Mare Turf	3:04 pm	Maker's Mark	1 3/16 miles	3 yrs+ fillies & mares	$2 million	Kathynmarissa	5.62	3/4 length
Sprint	3:42 pm	Cygames	6 furlongs	3 yrs+	$2 million	T O Elvis	2.79	1 1/4 lengths
Mile	4:20 pm	FanDuel	1 mile	3 yrs+	$2 million	Deterministic	5.05	3/4 length
Distaff	4:58 pm	Longines	1 1/8 miles	3 yrs+ fillies & mares	$2 million	Nitrogen	0.79	2 lengths
Turf	5:36 pm	Longines	1 1/2 miles	3 yrs+	$5 million	Benvenuto Cellini (IRE)	3.26	3/4 length
Classic	6:16 pm	Longines	1 1/4 miles	3 yrs+	$7 million	Sovereignty	1.97	1 3/4 lengths

Legend:
Dirt Turf

== Broadcast ==
Television coverage is provided by USA Network, Peacock, and FanDuel TV.
