= 2019 Breeders' Cup =

Thoroughbred horse racing event

- Class: Championship Event Series
- Location: Santa Anita Park
- Race type: Thoroughbred
- Website: www.breederscup.com

Race information
- Distance: See individual races
- Surface: Turf, Dirt
- Purse: Varies by Race; from $1 million to $6 million

The 2019 Breeders' Cup World Championships was the 36th edition of the premier event of the North American thoroughbred horse racing year. The 14 races, all but one of which were Grade I, took place on November 1 and 2 at Santa Anita Park in Arcadia, California. The races were telecast by NBCSN on Friday and early Saturday, and by NBC later on Saturday.

The Breeders' Cup is generally regarded as the end of the North American racing season, although a few Grade I events take place in later November and December. The event typically determines champions in many of the Eclipse Award divisions.

== Qualifying ==
A maximum of 14 horses (12 in the Turf Sprint and Juvenile Turf Sprint) are allowed to start in each race. Horses can automatically qualify by winning one of the designated races in the Breeders' Cup Challenge series, which provide "Win and You're In" berths in a specified division of the Breeders' Cup. Other pre-entries are ranked by a points system and the judgement of a panel of experts.

On October 21, pre-entries to the event were submitted for 188 horses, including 47 from overseas. During this stage, the connections of the horses indicated their intention to enter a specific race, and could also list a possible alternate. After assessing the potential competition, the connections made their final decision and paid the necessary entry fees on October 28. At that time, the field for each race was set, barring injury or other unforeseen circumstances.

Fifty of the pre-entries qualified automatically via the Breeders' Cup Challenge series. These included the two leading candidates for the Classic, McKinzie (Whitney Handicap) and Code of Honor (Jockey Club Gold Cup). Other highly ranked qualifiers included Bricks and Mortar (Arlington Million) in the Breeders' Cup Turf and Midnight Bisou (Ogden Phipps, Personal Ensign Stakes) in the Distaff, both undefeated in 2019 and considered leading candidates for Horse of the Year.

== Event preparation ==
On August 17, 2018, the Breeders' Cup organization announced that Santa Anita Park would host the event for a record tenth time. The track committed to over $5 million in improvements, including new suites on the upper level of the grandstand. The selection became controversial however when 30 horses died during Santa Anita's 2018-9 winter-spring meeting, raising concerns over the safety of the equine athletes. The management of Santa Anita undertook several changes, including extensive testing of the track surface and changes regarding pre-race medication. "It's been an area of concern," said Chad Brown, Eclipse Award-winning trainer. "But ultimately I didn't avoid running any horses in the Breeders' Cup due to this issue. I did have some questions from clients, but I feel confident Santa Anita management will make the track safe, and I agree with all the safeguards their management has put in."

Out-of-competition testing for the event was also extensive, including the use of hair samples for the first time.

Extensive wildfires in California, including the Getty Fire in western Los Angeles, did not affect the Breeders' Cup as they were all downwind from the facility.

== Results ==
Santa Anita took several actions to increase the safety of horses and jockeys, such as closing the downhill turf course after several horses had been injured while crossing over the main track. This meant that the turf sprint races were run at 5 furlongs instead of the normal 6 1/2 furlongs. They also increased the number of veterinarians in attendance, which resulted in several scratches before racing began. Despite the precautions, Mongolian Groom was seriously injured during the running of the Classic and had to be euthanized.

Jockey Irad Ortiz Jr. won the Shoemaker Award as the leading jockey during the event. He rode four winners, including Bricks and Mortar in the $4 million Turf and Vino Rosso in the $6 million Classic.

Trainer Chad Brown was the leading trainer of the event with three winners: Bricks and Mortar in the Turf, Uni in the Mile and Structor in the Juvenile Turf. This gave Brown 15 lifetime wins at the Breeders' Cup, tying him for second with Bob Baffert. D. Wayne Lukas has the all-time lead with 20 wins.

=== Friday, November 1 ===
The on-track attendance was 41,243, down slightly from the Friday attendance in 2018 at Churchill Downs. However, all-source wagering was up 5.4%, to a record of $56,517,228.

For the second year in a row, all five Breeders' Cup races on "Future Stars Friday" were for two-year-olds. The day featured several upsets, most notably that of Storm the Court in the Juvenile at odds of 45-1. The favorite, Dennis' Moment, stumbled at the start and was never a factor, ultimately finishing last. Storm the Court took the early lead and turned back a late challenge from Anneau d'Or, another longshot.

The only favorite to win was Four Wheel Drive in the Juvenile Turf Sprint. Four Wheel Drive is from the first crop of horses sired by Grand Slam winner American Pharoah.

Race name	Post time (PDT)	Sponsor	Distance/Surface	Restrictions	Purse	Winner (Bred)	Odds	Margin
Juvenile Turf Sprint	1:12 PM		5 furlongs (Turf)	2-year-olds	$1 million	Four Wheel Drive (KY)	1.50*	3/4 lengths
Juvenile Turf	1:52 PM		1 mile (Turf)	2-year-old colts and geldings	$1 million	Structor (KY)	5.30	3/4 lengths
Juvenile Fillies	2:32 PM		1 1/16 miles	2-year-old fillies	$2 million	British Idiom (KY)	2.70	Neck
Juvenile Fillies Turf	3:12 PM		1 mile (Turf)	2-year-old fillies	$1 million	Sharing (MD)	13.80	1 1/4 lengths
Juvenile	4:03 PM	TVG	1 1/16 miles	2-year-old colts and geldings	$2 million	Storm the Court (KY)	45.90	Neck

An asterisk after the odds means the horse was the betting favorite.

Source: Equibase Charts

=== Saturday, November 2 ===
Saturday attendance was 67,811. Betting handle for the 14 Breeders' Cup races on Friday and Saturday was a record $154 million, up 12% from 2018.

Only two favorites won on the Saturday card, Covfefe in the Filly and Mare Sprint and Bricks and Mortar in the Turf. Both horses were then expected to win their respective divisions at the Eclipse Awards, which they did, and Bricks and Mortar was the leading candidate for horse of the year, which he also won. Mitole, second choice in the Sprint, won that race and was expected to win the champion sprinter title, which he did. Despite being upset in the Distaff, Midnight Bisou was seen as likely to be named the Champion Older Female Horse, which she was. The female turf division was considered likely to be a tossup between Uni, who won the Mile, and Sistercharlie, who finished third in the Filly and Mare Turf, though Uni ultimately won by a wide margin.

Iridessa was the only European-trained horse to win at the event. Her trainer Joseph O'Brien became the youngest trainer, at age 26, to ever win a Breeders' Cup race. The son of Aidan O'Brien also became just the second person to have Breeders' Cup wins as both a jockey and trainer, Freddy Head being the other.

Race Name	Post time (PDT)	Sponsor	Distance/Surface	Restrictions	Purse	Winner (Bred)	Odds	Margin
Filly & Mare Sprint	11:55 PM		7 furlongs	3 yrs+ fillies & mares	$1 million	Covfefe (KY)	1.50*	3/4 lengths
Turf Sprint	12:33 PM		5 furlongs (Turf)	3 yrs+	$1 million	Belvoir Bay (GB)	14.80	1 1/4 lengths
Dirt Mile	1:10 PM	Big Ass Fans	1 mile	3 yrs+	$1 million	Spun to Run (KY)	9.10	2 3/4 lengths
Filly & Mare Turf	1:54 PM	Maker's Mark	1 1/4 miles (Turf)	3 yrs+ fillies & mares	$2 million	Iridessa (IRE)	13.20	Neck
Sprint	2:36 PM		6 furlongs	3 yrs+	$2 million	Mitole (KY)	1.80	1 1/4 lengths
Mile	3:20 PM	TVG	1 mile (Turf)	3 yrs+	$2 million	Uni (GB)	3.60	1 1/2 lengths
Distaff	4:00 PM	Longines	1 1/8 miles	3 yrs+ fillies & mares	$2 million	Blue Prize (ARG)	8.90	1 1/2 lengths
Turf	4:40 PM	Longines	1 1/2 miles (Turf)	3 yrs+	$4 million	Bricks and Mortar (KY)	1.00*	Head
Classic	5:44 PM	Longines	1 1/4 miles	3 yrs+	$6 million	Vino Rosso (KY)	4.60	4 1/4 lengths

Source: Equibase Charts
