= Annapolis (horse) =

American thoroughbred racehorse

- Sire: War Front
- Grandsire: Danzig
- Dam: My Miss Sophia
- Damsire: Unbridled's Song
- Sex: Colt
- Foaled: 1 April 2019
- Country: United States
- Color: Bay
- Breeder: Bass Stables
- Owner: Bass Racing
- Trainer: Todd A. Pletcher
- Record: 13 : 6-4-0
- Earnings: $1,581,770

Major wins
- Pilgrim Stakes (2021); Saranac Stakes (2022); Coolmore Turf Mile (2022)
- Last updated on 8 October 2023

Annapolis (foaled April 1, 2019) is a multiple Graded stakes turf winning Thoroughbred racehorse. His Grade I wins in 2022 include the Coolmore Turf Mile Stakes at Keeneland and the Grade II Pilgrim Stakes as a two-year-old in 2021.

== Background ==
Annapolis is a bay colt who was bred in Kentucky by Perry Bass's Bass Stables. He was sired by War Front, who became one of the most successful turf sires in the last decade who at one time had a stud fee of $250,000. Annapolis became the 100th black-type winner for his Claiborne Farm sire after his Pilgrim Stakes victory. Annapolis is the second foal out of the Graded stakes winner, GII Gazelle Stakes and GI Kentucky Oaks runner-up My Miss Sophia in 2014. The mare, a daughter of Unbridled's Song, has also produced the stakes-placed runner Nevisian Surprise and a yearling colt, both of whom are full siblings to Annapolis. My Miss Sophia was a $4 million purchase by agent Steve Young from the Lane's End consignment to the 2018 Keeneland November Breeding Stock Sale, where she was carrying Annapolis in utero.

Annapolis is owned by the racing arm of Bass Stable and is trained by U.S. Racing Hall of Fame trainer Todd Pletcher.

== Racing career ==
=== 2021: two-year-old season ===
Annapolis debuted on September 4 in a $100,000 maiden special weight on the inner turf course at Saratoga Race Course over the 1 1/16-mile distance. At odds of 6/5, he closed with a strong rally after tracking eighth behind opening fractions of :24.33 and :49.68 set by I'll Figure It Out, and made the lead outside the furlong marker. He kicked clear outside the sixteenth pole and drew away under steady urging from jockey Irad Ortiz Jr. to win by 4 1/2 lengths in a time of 1:43.47 on a firm course. Nyquest Nix was second, and Ohtwoohthreefive completed the trifecta a length back. Pletcher said, "He had a great turn of foot, kept going to the wire, and galloped out nicely. It was pretty much everything you could hope for in a debut."

A month later, Pletcher entered Annapolis in his first stakes event, the Grade II Pilgrim Stakes at Belmont Park. Breaking from post 2 in a field of four, Annapolis sat second behind pacesetter Portfolio Company, who marked off splits of :24.34 for the quarter-mile and :48.96 to the half-mile. At the half-mile pole, jockey Irad Ortiz Jr. began to inch Annapolis closer to the leader, and the colts met up at the quarter pole after six furlongs in 1:12.22. The leading pair gained separation from their two competitors, Limited Liability and Doctor Jeff, and battled to the wire. Annapolis put his head on the wire in a final time of 1:41.04 for the 1 1/16 miles on the firm turf.

He missed the Grade I Breeders' Cup Juvenile Turf last year when in need of surgery to have chips removed from a hind ankle.

=== 2022: three-year-old season ===
Annapolis's second start of the year was on July 4 in the Listed Manila Stakes over a mile on the Widener turf at Belmont Park. He broke from post 2 with Irad Ortiz Jr. in the irons and settled into fourth while stablemate Chanceux set an even tempo up front, coasting through an opening quarter-mile in 23.41 seconds over the firm turf. A half-mile went in 46.14, with Boston Tea Party leading the field by a head. As the field straightened for the drive to the wire, Annapolis found a seam, with Ortiz guiding him to split rivals, leaving the others to fight for second. Annapolis was in hand at the sixteenth pole and was a 2 3/4-length winner in a time of 1:32.81.

On September 3, Todd Pletcher entered Annapolis in the Grade III Saranac Stakes at Saratoga. Facing a small field with three rivals, Irad Ortiz Jr. led Annapolis through soft opening splits of :25, :49.79, and 1:13.65 over the firm going in the a 1 1/16-mile turf event for sophomores before drawing off to a 5 1/2-length victory in a final time of 1:42.57. Annapolis started as the 3/20 odds-on $2.30 favorite. Pletcher said Annapolis would next face older horses for the first time in the $1 million Grade I Coolmore Turf Mile Stakes on October 8 at Keeneland, which offered a Breeders' Cup Challenge berth to the Grade I Breeders' Cup Mile. He commented, "He's shown up and run well in each start of his life. We just felt like he was a colt that carries plenty of condition. We had thought about training up to the Coolmore Turf Mile at Keeneland but decided he was doing great and probably a race in between would suit him. We (think highly of him) and feel like a mile might suit him perfectly, and so we'll see where we fit, but he's a big, strong colt physically. He seems like the type that would handle that step up in age."

In the GI Coolmore Turf Mile Stakes, Ortiz positioned Annapolis third early, sitting right behind the speed. He then took command after tipping out in the stretch and drew clear by 1 1/2 lengths over the Brazilian-bred Ivar, the 2020 Turf Mile winner. Annapolis, starting at 13/2, ran the mile on a firm course that played quickly in a stakes-record 1:33.29, gaining his fifth win and increasing his earnings to $1,166,100. The last time a three-year-old won the event was Aussie Rules in 2006. Todd Pletcher won the Coolmore Turf Mile for the second time after capturing it in 2005 with Host when the race was sponsored by Shadwell.

== Stud career ==
The first foal by Annapolis, a colt out of Ramona Bass' Grade 1-placed mare Home Cooking, was born on January 26 at Claiborne Farm in Paris, Kentucky.

== Statistics ==
Date	Distance	Race	Grade	Track	Odds	Field	Finish	Winning Time	Winning (Losing) Margin	Jockey	Ref
2021 – two-year-old season
Sep 4, 2021	1 1/16 miles	Maiden Special Weight		Saratoga	1.35*	10	1	1:43.47	4 1/2 lengths	Irad Ortiz Jr.	
Oct 3, 2021	1 1/16 miles	Pilgrim Stakes	II	Belmont Park	0.65*	4	1	1:41.04	head	Irad Ortiz Jr.	
2022 – three-year-old season
Jun 3, 2022	1 mile	Penn Mile Stakes	II	Penn National Race Course	0.50*	8	2	1:34.64	(1 1/4 lengths)	Irad Ortiz Jr.	
Jul 4, 2022	1 mile	Manila Stakes	Listed	Belmont Park	0.65*	7	1	1:32.81	2 3/4 lengths	Irad Ortiz Jr.	
Aug 6, 2022	1 3/16 miles	Saratoga Derby	I	Saratoga	2.90	10	2	1:54.72	(1 3/4 lengths)	Irad Ortiz Jr.	
Sep 3, 2022	1 1/16 miles	Saranac Stakes	III	Saratoga	0.15*	4	1	1:42:57	5 1/2 lengths	Irad Ortiz Jr.	
Oct 8, 2022	1 mile	Coolmore Turf Mile	I	Keeneland	6.35	11	1	1:33.29 (Note: Annapolis set a new stakes record in the Coolmore Turf Mile Stakes eclipsing the old record by 0.43 of a second set by Alibar in 2000)	1 1/2 lengths	Irad Ortiz Jr.	
Nov 5, 2022	1 mile	Breeders' Cup Mile	I	Keeneland	5.85	14	11	1:33.96	(5 1/4 lengths)	Irad Ortiz Jr.	
2023 – four-year-old season
May 4, 2023	1 mile	Opening Verse Stakes	Listed	Churchill Downs	0.83*	11	1	1:35.73	head	Irad Ortiz Jr.	
Jul 15, 2023	1 mile	Kelso Stakes	III	Saratoga	*0.95	7	2	1:35.51	(1 length)	Irad Ortiz Jr.	
Aug 12, 2023	1 mile	Fourstardave Handicap	I	Saratoga	1.25*	7	2	1:34.20	(3/4 length)	Irad Ortiz Jr.	
Sep 2, 2023	1 mile	Mint Millions Stakes	III	Kentucky Downs	1.14*	12	5	1:33.37	(4 1/4 lengths)	Tyler Gaffalione	
Oct 7, 2023	1 mile	Coolmore Turf Mile	I	Keeneland	4.33	9	4	1:34.18	(3 1/2 lengths)	Flavien Prat	

Legend:
Turf Dirt
Notes:
An (*) asterisk after the odds means Annapolis was the post-time favorite.

== Pedigree ==
Pedigree of Annapolis, bay colt, April 1, 2019
Sire War Front (2002)	Danzig (1977)	Northern Dancer (CAN) (1961)	Nearctic (CAN) (1954)
Sire War Front (2002)	Danzig (1977)	Northern Dancer (CAN) (1961)	Natalma (1954)
Sire War Front (2002)	Danzig (1977)	Pas de Nom (1968)	Admiral's Voyage (1959)
Sire War Front (2002)	Danzig (1977)	Pas de Nom (1968)	Petitioner (GB) (1952)
Sire War Front (2002)	Starry Dreamer (1994)	Rubiano (1987)	Fappiano (1977)
Sire War Front (2002)	Starry Dreamer (1994)	Rubiano (1987)	Ruby Slippers (1982)
Sire War Front (2002)	Starry Dreamer (1994)	Lara's Star (1981)	Forli (ARG) (1963)
Sire War Front (2002)	Starry Dreamer (1994)	Lara's Star (1981)	True Reality (1973)
Dam My Miss Sophia (2011)	Unbridled's Song (1993)	Unbridled (1987)	Fappiano (1977)
Dam My Miss Sophia (2011)	Unbridled's Song (1993)	Unbridled (1987)	Gana Facil (1981)
Dam My Miss Sophia (2011)	Unbridled's Song (1993)	Trolley Song (1983)	Caro (IRE) (1967)
Dam My Miss Sophia (2011)	Unbridled's Song (1993)	Trolley Song (1983)	Lucky Spell (1971)
Dam My Miss Sophia (2011)	Wildwood Flower (2001)	Langfuhr (CAN) (1992)	Danzig (1977)
Dam My Miss Sophia (2011)	Wildwood Flower (2001)	Langfuhr (CAN) (1992)	Sweet Briar Too (1986)
Dam My Miss Sophia (2011)	Wildwood Flower (2001)	Dial A Trick (1990)	Phone Trick (1982)
Dam My Miss Sophia (2011)	Wildwood Flower (2001)	Dial A Trick (1990)	Ice Fantasy (1980) (family: A-5)

Annapolis is inbred 2s x 4d to Danzig
Annapolis is inbred 4s x 4d to Fappiano
