= 2025 Breeders' Cup =

- Class: Championship Event Series
- Location: Del Mar Fairgrounds, Del Mar, California
- Race type: Thoroughbred
- Website: www.breederscup.com

Race information
- Distance: See individual races
- Surface: Turf, Dirt
- Purse: Varies by race; from $1 million to $7 million

The 2025 Breeders' Cup World Championships was the 42nd edition of the premier event of the North American Thoroughbred horse racing year. The 14 races, all of which are Grade I, took place on October 31 and November 1 at Del Mar in Del Mar, California.

The Breeders' Cup is generally regarded as the end of the North American racing season, although a few Grade I events take place in later November and December. The event typically determines champions in many of the Eclipse Award divisions.

== Races ==
=== Friday, October 31 ===
Race name	Post time (PDT)	Sponsor	Distance	Restrictions	Purse	Winner (Bred)	Odds	Margin
Juvenile Turf Sprint	2:45 pm		5 furlongs	2-year-olds	$1 million	Cy Fair (USA)	5.00	3/4 length
Juvenile Fillies	3:25 pm	NetJets	1 1/16 miles	2-year-old fillies	$2 million	Super Corredora (USA)	8.80	3/4 length
Juvenile Fillies Turf	4:05 pm	John Deere	1 mile	2-year-old fillies	$1 million	Balantina (IRE)	20.60	1 1/4 lengths
Juvenile	4:45 pm	FanDuel	1 1/16 miles	2-year-old colts and geldings	$2 million	Ted Noffey (USA)	0.80	1 length
Juvenile Turf	5:25 pm		1 mile	2-year-old colts and geldings	$1 million	Gstaad (GB)	1.20	3/4 length

Legend:
Dirt Turf

=== Saturday, November 1 ===
Race name	Post time (PDT)	Sponsor	Distance	Restrictions	Purse	Winner (Bred)	Odds	Margin
Filly & Mare Sprint	12:00 pm	PNC Bank	7 furlongs	3 yrs+ fillies & mares	$1 million	Splendora (USA)	2.90	4 3/4 lengths
Turf Sprint	12:41 pm	Prevagan	5 furlongs	3 yrs+	$1 million	Shisospicy (USA)	5.30	2 1/2 lengths
Sprint	1:21 pm	Cygames	6 furlongs	3 yrs+	$2 million	Bentornato (USA)	1.70	2 1/4 lengths
Distaff	2:01 pm	Longines	1 1/8 miles	3 yrs+ fillies & mares	$2 million	Scylla (USA)	7.60	5 1/2 lengths
Turf	2:41 pm	Longines	1 1/2 miles	3 yrs+	$5 million	Ethical Diamond (IRE)	27.70	1 1/4 lengths
Classic	3:25 pm	Longines	1 1/4 miles	3 yrs+	$7 million	Forever Young (JPN)	3.50	1/2 length
Mile	4:05 pm	FanDuel	1 mile	3 yrs+	$2 million	Notable Speech (GB)	2.60	1 1/2 lengths
Dirt Mile	4:45 pm		1 mile	3 yrs+	$1 million	Nysos (USA)	0.70	head
Filly & Mare Turf	5:25 pm	Maker's Mark	1 3/8 miles	3 yrs+ fillies & mares	$2 million	Gezora (FR)	9.10	1/2 length

Legend:
Dirt Turf

== Broadcast ==
This is the first time FanDuel TV broadcast all Breeders' Cup all 14 races events, including Turf and Classic. Peacock also streamed all events.
