= 2007 Breeders' Cup =

Thoroughbred horse racing event

The 2007 Breeders' Cup World Championships took place on October 26 and 27 at Monmouth Park in Oceanport, the first time the event had been held in New Jersey. The 2007 event included several milestones, with three new races added, a second day added to the program and the introduction of the Breeders' Cup Challenge series.

== Breeders' Cup Challenge series ==
The Breeders' Cup Challenge series was introduced in 2007 as a way to automatically qualify for the Breeders' Cup under a "win and you're in" format. In addition to the automatic entry, the goal was to build brand recognition for the Breeders' Cup and horse racing in general throughout the year, in combination with broadcast partner ESPN. "This is a long race," said ESPN programmer Len DeLuca. "This is a very long race, in terms of making the sport of kings interesting and accessible to the casual fan. But it's the next step in the evolution of horse racing coverage."

The 2007 series consisted of 24 races held at 6 different racetracks in the United States and Canada. Fourteen of the series winners later raced in the Breeders' Cup, with four of them winning: War Pass in the Juvenile, Ginger Punch in the Distaff, English Channel in the Turf and Curlin in the Classic.

== Lead-up ==
The Breeders' Cup was held at Monmouth Park for the first time in 2007. To accommodate the event, more than $25 million was invested in improving the facilities. The event was expected to generate $57.6 million for the state.

The European-contingent was led by Dylan Thomas, who was the top ranked horse in the world after winning the Prix de l'Arc de Triomphe. "He's as good a horse as we've ever had," said trainer Aidan O'Brien. "We think he's a superstar." O'Brien also shipped George Washington over to race in the Classic. George Washington had been retired after finishing sixth in the 2006 Classic but proved sub-fertile and returned to racing.

== Friday: New Races ==
In January, The Breeders' Cup announced the creation of three new $1 million races to be held on Friday, the day before the traditional big day. By rule, the three new races could not be graded until several renewals were completed to evaluate their quality, meaning that these were the first Breeders' Cup Races that were not run under Grade 1 status. (In 1984, an exception was made for the original Breeders' Cup Races to immediately grant them grade 1 status.)

The three New races were:

| Race name | Sponsor | Distance/Surface | Restrictions | Purse | Winner |
| Filly & Mare Sprint | | 6 Furlongs | Fillies & Mares | $1 million | Maryfield |
| Juvenile Turf | | 1 mile Turf | 2-year-old colts & geldings | $1 million | Nownownow |
| Dirt Mile | | 1 mile and 70 Yards | 3 yrs+ | $1 million | Corinthian |

TV: ESPN2 4-6 PM ET
The attendance was 27,803.

== Saturday: Day 2 ==
The following races were run on the next day:

| Race name | Sponsor | Distance/Surface | Restrictions | Purse | Winner |
| Juvenile Fillies | Grey Goose Vodka | 1 1/16 miles (1.7 km) - dirt | 2-year-old fillies | $2 million | Indian Blessing |
| Juvenile | Bessemer Trust | 1 1/16 miles (1.7 km) - dirt | 2-year-old colts & geldings | $2 million | War Pass |
| Filly & Mare Turf | Emirates | 1 3/8 miles (2.2 km) - turf | Fillies & Mares | $2 million | Lahudood |
| Sprint | TVG Network | 6 furlongs - dirt | 3 yrs+ | $2 million | Midnight Lute |
| Mile | NetJets | 1 mile - turf | 3 yrs+ | $2 million | Kip Deville |
| Distaff | Emirates | 1 1/8 miles (1.8 km) - dirt | Fillies and mares 3 yrs+ | $2 million | Ginger Punch |
| Turf | John Deere | 1 1/2 miles (2.4 km) - turf | 3 yrs+ | $3 million | English Channel |
| Classic | Dodge | 1 1/4 miles (2.0 km) - dirt | 3 yrs+ | $5 million | Curlin |

The Classic was marred by a fatal injury suffered by George Washington, the 2006 European 3-year-old champion who had returned to training when his stud career was scuttled by fertility problems. He suffered a dislocated fracture of his right front ankle and was euthanized on the track.

TV:ESPN 12-7 PM
