= Catholic Boy (horse) =

American Thoroughbred racehorse

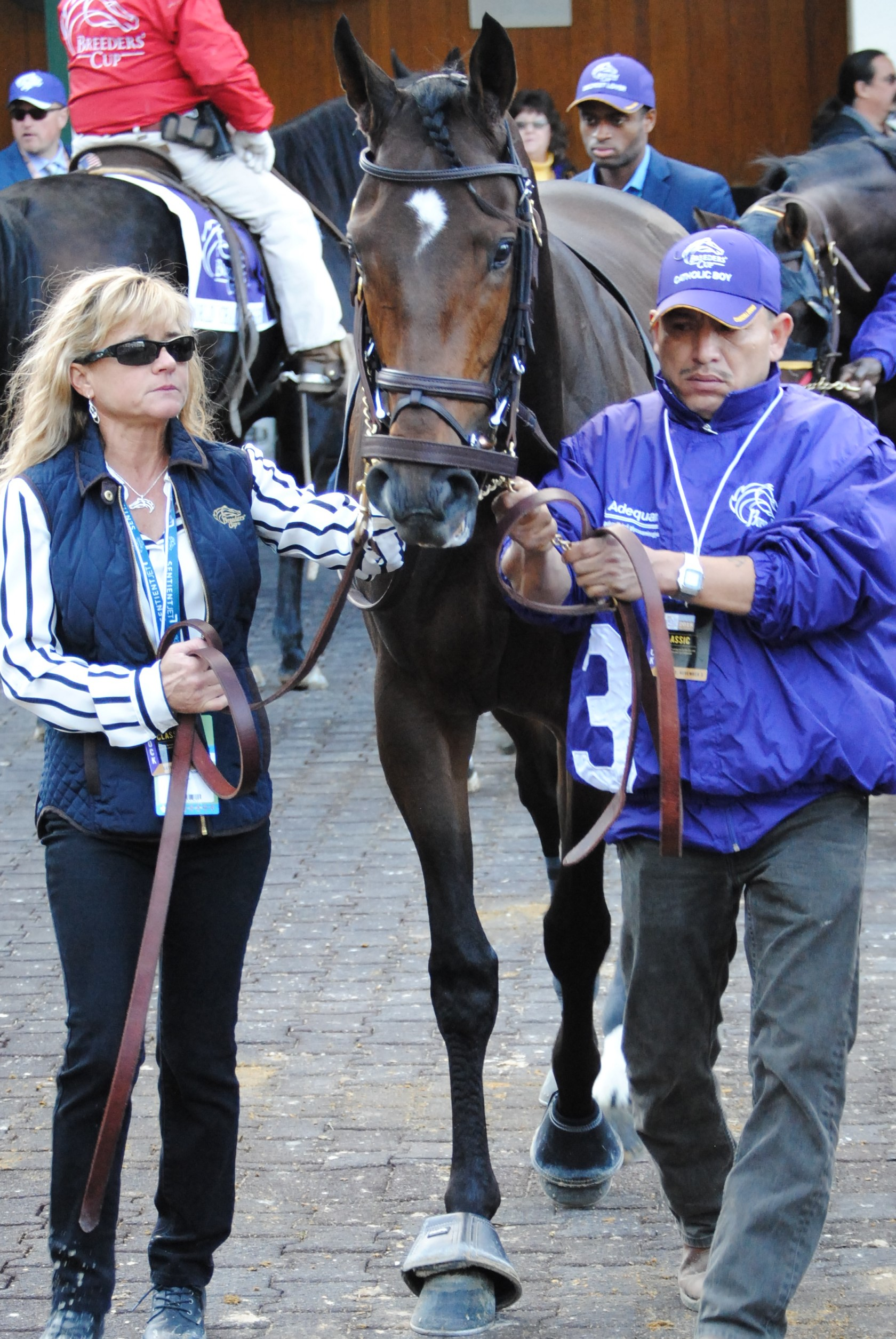
- Catholic Boy at the 2018 Breeders' Cup
- Sire: More Than Ready
- Grandsire: Southern Halo
- Dam: Song of Bernadette
- Damsire: Bernardini
- Sex: Stallion
- Foaled: April 12, 2015
- Country: United States
- Colour: Bay
- Breeder: Fred W. Hertrich III & John D. Fielding
- Owner: Robert LaPenta, Madaket Stables, Siena Farm, Twin Creeks Stables
- Trainer: Jonathan Thomas
- Record: 13: 7-2-0
- Earnings: $2,134,000

Major wins
- With Anticipation Stakes (2017); Remsen Stakes (2017); Pennine Ridge Stakes (2018); Belmont Derby (2018); Travers Stakes (2018); Dixie Stakes (2019)

Catholic Boy (foaled April 12, 2015), is an American Thoroughbred racehorse who won major races on both turf and dirt. As a juvenile in 2017 he won three of his four races including the With Anticipation Stakes and the Remsen Stakes. In the following year he was one of the best colts of his generation in America, winning the Pennine Ridge Stakes and Belmont Derby on turf before switching to dirt to take the Travers Stakes. As a four-year-old in 2019 he won the Dixie Stakes.

== Background ==
Catholic Boy is a bay horse with a white star bred in Kentucky by Fred W. Hertrich III & John D. Fielding. As a yearling in January 2016 he was put up for auction at Keeneland but failed to reach his reserve price of $170,000. He subsequently entered the ownership of a partnership headed by Robert LaPenta which also included Madaket Stables, Siena Farm and Twin Creeks Racing Stables. He was sent into training with Jonathan Thomas.

He was sired by More Than Ready, a top-class American sprinter who won the King's Bishop Stakes in 2000. His other progeny have included Roy H and Verrazano. Catholic Boy's dam Song of Bernadette showed negligible ability on the track, failing to win in five starts. She was a female-line descendant of the Argentinian mare La Sevillana, making her a relative of La Lorgnette and Hawk Wing.

== Racing career ==
=== 2017: two-year-old season ===
Catholic Boy made his track debut in a maiden race over seven and a half furlongs on turf at Gulfstream Park on July 20, 2017. Ridden by Carlos Monsalvo he started at odds of 4.1/1 and won by two lengths from Discovered. The colt was then stepped up in class and distance for the Grade III With Anticipation Stakes on turf at Saratoga Race Course on August 30. After being repeatedly hampered he accelerated through a gap in the closing stages and won by a length at odds of 11.2/1. His rider Manny Franco commented "I had a lot of horse under me and I was trying to find my way out. I had to wait a little longer than I wanted, but the hole opened, and I had a lot of horse left and we won".

In the Grade I Breeders' Cup Juvenile Turf at Del Mar Racetrack on November 3 Catholic Boy finished fourth behind Mendelssohn, Untamed Domain and Voting Control with Masar and Sands of Mali among those running unplaced. The colt was then switched to the dirt for the Grade II Remsen Stakes over nine furlongs at Aqueduct Racetrack on December 2. With Franco in the saddle he tracked the leaders before moving up to take the lead on the final turn and drawing away to win by four and three quarter lengths from the favourite Avery Island. After the race Jonathan Thomas said "We came over quietly confident he would show us a little something, but we never expected that".

=== 2018: three-year-old season ===
On his three-year-old debut Catholic Boy started odds-on favourite for the Grade III Sam F. Davis Stakes on dirt at Tampa Bay Downs in February but was beaten half a length by the Mark Casse-trained Flameaway. Irad Ortiz took over the ride from Franco when the colt contested the Grade I Florida Derby at Gulfstream on March 31 and came home fourth of the nine runners, twelve lengths behind the winner Audible. The colt returned to the turf at Belmont on June 2 for the Grade III Pennine Ridge Stakes and started second favourite behind the Transylvania Stakes winner Analyze It. Ridden by Javier Castellano he led soon after the start and after being headed by the favourite in the stretch he rallied to regain the advantage and won by a neck. Thomas commented "He's been nothing but reliable. We have asked him a lot of questions. I'm proud of his effort and his tenacity".

On 9 July Catholic Boy again faced Analyze It in the Grade I Belmont Derby and started at odds of 5.1/1 in a nine-runner field which also included Hunting Horn (Hampton Court Stakes) from Ireland, Kingstar from France, My Boy Jack (Southwest Stakes) and Hawkish (Penn Mile Stakes). In a near replica of the Pennine Ridge Stakes he led for most of the way and after being overtaken by Analyze It he regained the lead in the final strides to win by a head. After the race Thomas, who was winning his first Grade I race said "It was a hell of a horse race. He really has a lot of heart. I didn't expect him to fight back this time. I thought we were going to finish a real good second... somehow he got it done."

At Saratoga Race Course on August 25, with Castellano again in the saddle, Catholic Boy was one of ten three-year-olds to contest the 149th edition of the Grade I Travers Stakes over ten furlongs on dirt. He started the 7.1/1 third choice in the betting behind Good Magic and Gronkowski while the other contenders included Vino Rosso (Wood Memorial), Mendelssohn, Bravazo (second in the Preakness Stakes), Tenfold (Jim Dandy Stakes) and the Canadian filly Wonder Gadot. After tracking the front-running Mendelssohn Catholic Boy went to the front inside the last quarter mile and drew away in the final furlong to win "readily" by four lengths. Robert LaPenta commented "They should make a movie about this... I've been coming to Saratoga since I was 18. This race has always been my dream. Even more than the Kentucky Derby."

For his final run of 2018, Catholic Boy was matched against older horses in the Breeders' Cup Classic at Churchill Downs on November 2. He was made the 6/1 third choice in the betting but never looked likely to win and came home thirteenth of the fourteen runners behind Accelerate.

In the 2018 World's Best Racehorse Rankings Catholic Boy was rated the third best three-year-old colt in the world behind Roaring Lion and Justify and the twentieth best horse of any age or sex.

=== 2019: four-year-old season ===
Catholic Boy began his third campaign in the Dixie Stakes over 8 1/2 furlongs on turf at Pimlico Race Course on May 18 and went off 1.4/1 favourite against nine opponents. He settled in second place behind Real Story before taking the lead a furlong out and held off the late challenge of Admission Office to win by half a length. Castellano commented "He's a super horse. You can do whatever you want. He can be on pace, he can come from behind. I like the way he did it". On 6 July the colt started favourite for the Suburban Handicap over ten furlongs on dirt and finished second to the six-year-old Preservationist, to whom he was conceding six pounds in weight. He was retired from racing after running fourth when favorite for the Knickerbocker Stakes at Belmont in October.

== Stud record ==
Catholic Boy began his career as a breeding stallion at Claiborne Farm, at a stud fee of $25,000. Catholic Boy's first graded stakes victory for an offspring was El Catolico, who on February 11, 2024, won the Grade 3 Clasico Jorge Washington Stakes at Hipódromo Camarero in Puerto Rico. Catholic Boy stud fee for 2024 was stated at US$10,000.

== Pedigree ==
Pedigree of Catholic Boy (USA), bay colt, 2015
Sire More Than Ready (USA) 1997	Southern Halo (USA); 1983	Halo	Hail to Reason
Sire More Than Ready (USA) 1997	Southern Halo (USA); 1983	Halo	Cosmah
Sire More Than Ready (USA) 1997	Southern Halo (USA); 1983	Northern Sea	Northern Dancer
Sire More Than Ready (USA) 1997	Southern Halo (USA); 1983	Northern Sea	Sea Saga
Sire More Than Ready (USA) 1997	Woodman's Girl (USA); 1990	Woodman	Mr. Prospector*
Sire More Than Ready (USA) 1997	Woodman's Girl (USA); 1990	Woodman	Playmate
Sire More Than Ready (USA) 1997	Woodman's Girl (USA); 1990	Becky be Good	Naskra
Sire More Than Ready (USA) 1997	Woodman's Girl (USA); 1990	Becky be Good	Good Landing
Dam Song of Bernadette (USA) 2009	Bernardini (USA); 2003	A.P. Indy	Seattle Slew
Dam Song of Bernadette (USA) 2009	Bernardini (USA); 2003	A.P. Indy	Weekend Surprise
Dam Song of Bernadette (USA) 2009	Bernardini (USA); 2003	Cara Rafaela	Quiet American
Dam Song of Bernadette (USA) 2009	Bernardini (USA); 2003	Cara Rafaela	Oil Fable
Dam Song of Bernadette (USA) 2009	Winner's Edge (USA); 1992	Seeking The Gold	Mr. Prospector*
Dam Song of Bernadette (USA) 2009	Winner's Edge (USA); 1992	Seeking The Gold	Con Game
Dam Song of Bernadette (USA) 2009	Winner's Edge (USA); 1992	Lucky Us	Nijinsky (CAN)
Dam Song of Bernadette (USA) 2009	Winner's Edge (USA); 1992	Lucky Us	La Sevillana (ARG) (Family: 9-g)

- Catholic Boy is inbred 4S × 4D to Mr. Prospector, meaning that this stallion appears twice in the fourth generation of his pedigree, once on the sire side and once on the dam side.
