= With Anticipation Stakes =

- Class: Grade III
- Location: Saratoga Race Course; Saratoga Springs, New York, United States
- Inaugurated: 2005
- Race type: Thoroughbred – Flat racing
- Website: NYRA

Race information
- Distance: 1 1/16 miles
- Surface: Turf
- Track: Left-handed
- Qualification: Two-year-olds
- Weight: 122 lbs with allowances
- Purse: US$175,000 (2022)

The With Anticipation Stakes is a Grade III American Thoroughbred horse race for two-year-olds over a distance of 1 1/16 miles on the turf track scheduled annually in end of August or early September at Saratoga Race Course in Saratoga Springs, New York.

== History ==
The race is named in honor of George W. Strawbridge Jr.'s outstanding turf runner, With Anticipation who won the Grade I Sword Dancer Stakes twice at Saratoga.

The event was inaugurated on 3 September 2005 with the second favorite Stream Cat, ridden by US Hall of Fame jockey Gary Stevens winning by 1 1/2 lengths in a time of 1:45 1/5.

The event was classified as a Grade III race in 2009, the American Graded Stakes Committee upgraded it to Grade II for 2011. In 2017 the event was downgraded to Grade III. The 2020 running was taken off the turf and run on a sloppy dirt track with four starters which resulted in an automatic downgrade to a Listed event.

The race is currently part of the Breeders' Cup Challenge series. The winner will automatically qualify for the Breeders' Cup Juvenile Turf.

The 2007 winner Nownownow went on to win the inaugural Breeders' Cup Juvenile Turf at Monmouth Park.

In 2023, Gala Brand became the first filly to win the With Anticipation Stakes.

== Records ==
Speed record:

- 1:40.94 – Catholic Boy (2017)

Margins:

- 4 1/2 lengths – Startup Nation (2014), Final Score (2025)

Most wins by an owner:

- 2 – Fab Oak Stable (2005, 2007)
- 2 – Klaravich Stables & William Lawrence (2012, 2014)
- 2 – Three Chimneys Farm (2016, 2020)

Most wins by a jockey:

- 3 – Javier Castellano (2013, 2016, 2018)

Most wins by a trainer:

- 8 – Todd A. Pletcher (2008, 2009, 2013, 2015, 2016, 2018, 2025, 2026)

== Winners ==
Year	Winner	Jockey	Trainer	Owner	Distance	Time	Purse	Grade	Ref
2026	Liam's Law	Ricardo Santana Jr.	Todd A. Pletcher	Lawana L. Low and Robert E. Low	1 1/16 miles	1:42.59	$225,000	III	
2025	Final Score	Kendrick Carmouche	Todd A. Pletcher	Repole Stable	1 1/16 miles	1:41.75	$175,000	III	
2024	Zulu Kingdom (IRE)	Flavien Prat	Chad C. Brown	Madaket Stables, Michael Dubb, William Strauss & Michael J. Caruso	1 1/16 miles	1:41.79	$175,000	III	
2023	Gala Brand	José Ortiz	William I. Mott	Arnmore Thoroughbreds LLC & Even Keel Thoroughbreds LLC	1 1/16 miles	1:45.93	$175,000	III	
2022	Boppy O	Dylan Davis	Mark E. Casse	John C. Oxley & Breeze Easy	1 1/16 miles	1:46.13	$175,000	III	
2021	Coinage	Junior Alvarado	Mark E. Casse	D. J. Stable, Mary & Chester Broman Sr.	1 1/16 miles	1:43.69	$150,000	III	
2020	Fire At Will	Irad Ortiz Jr.	Michael J. Maker	Three Chimneys Farm	7 furlongs	1:23.14	$93,000	Listed	Off turf
2019	Fighting Seabee	Brian Hernandez Jr.	Kenneth G. McPeek	Walking L Thoroughbreds	1 1/16 miles	1:43.34	$150,000	III	
2018	Opry	Javier Castellano	Todd A. Pletcher	Cheyenne Stables & Gaillardia Racing	1 1/16 miles	1:42.00	$150,000	III	
2017	Catholic Boy	Manuel Franco	Jonathan Thomas	Robert V. LaPenta	1 1/16 miles	1:40.94	$150,000	III	
2016	Made You Look	Javier Castellano	Todd A. Pletcher	Let's Go Stable & Three Chimneys Farm	1 1/16 miles	1:43.12	$200,000	II	
2015	Azar	John R. Velazquez	Todd A. Pletcher	Alto Racing	1 1/16 miles	1:41.68	$200,000	II	
2014	Startup Nation	Joel Rosario	Chad C. Brown	Klaravich Stables & William Lawrence	1 1/16 miles	1:41.63	$200,000	II	
2013	Bashart	Javier Castellano	Todd A. Pletcher	Rosedown Racing	1 1/16 miles	1:41.97	$200,000	II	
2012	Balance the Books	Julien R. Leparoux	Chad C. Brown	Klaravich Stables & William Lawrence	1 1/16 miles	1:42.30	$200,000	II	
2011	State of Play	Ramon A. Dominguez	H. Graham Motion	Team Valor International	1 1/16 miles	1:43.97	$151,000	II	
2010	Soldat	Alan Garcia	Kiaran P. McLaughlin	Harvey A. Clarke & Craig W. Robertson III	1 1/16 miles	1:41.37	$100,000	III	
2009	Interactif	Kent J. Desormeaux	Todd A. Pletcher	Wertheimer et Frère	1 1/16 miles	1:41.41	$109,500	III	
2008	Bittel Road	John R. Velazquez	Todd A. Pletcher	James T. Scatuorchio & John Iracane	1 1/16 miles	1:42.30	$82,400	Listed	
2007	Nownownow	Julien R. Leparoux	Patrick L. Biancone	Fab Oak Stable	1 1/16 miles	1:41.26	$83,250	Listed	
2006	Fernando Po	Edgar S. Prado	Michael E. Hushion	Barry K. Schwartz	1 1/16 miles	1:44.47	$72,700		
2005	Stream Cat	Gary L. Stevens	Patrick L. Biancone	Fab Oak Stable, Robert M. Hurley & Team Derby Dreams Stable	1 1/16 miles	1:45.40	$67,200		

Legend:
Dirt Turf

== See also ==
List of American and Canadian Graded races
