= Manila Stakes =

Grade III Thoroughbred horse race

- Class: Grade III
- Location: Belmont Park; Elmont, New York, United States
- Inaugurated: 2014
- Race type: Thoroughbred – Flat racing
- Website: NYRA

Race information
- Distance: 1 mile
- Surface: Turf
- Track: left-handed
- Qualification: Three-year-olds
- Weight: 122 lbs. with allowances
- Purse: US$250,000 (since 2023)

The Manila Stakes is a Grade III American Thoroughbred horse race for three-year-olds over a distance of one mile on the turf scheduled annually in early July at Belmont Park in Elmont, New York. The current purse is $250,000.

== History ==
The event is named after the US Hall of Famer Manila, the 1986 U.S. Champion Older Male Horse who won the 1986 Breeders' Cup Turf at Churchill Downs.

The event was inaugurated on June 28, 2014, and run over a distance of one mile and was won by R. Lee Lewis's Cabo Cat. Cabo Cat started at odds of 8/1 was ridden by jockey Joe Bravo who settled near the rear from the gate, was four-wide into the lane, rallied down the stretch while widest and held off Long On Value in the final stages to win by a length in a time of 1:33.57.

In 2020 due to the COVID-19 pandemic in the United States, NYRA did not schedule the event in their updated and shortened spring-summer meeting.

Three winners of this event have gone on and have won Grade I events. In 2023 the event was upgraded by the Thoroughbred Owners and Breeders Association to a Grade III.

In 2024 the event was moved to Aqueduct Racetrack due to infield tunnel and redevelopment work at Belmont Park.

== Records ==
Speed record

- 1 mile: 1:31.56 – Win Win Win (2019)

Margins

- 3 1/2 lengths – Up the Ante (2018)

Most wins by a jockey

- 2 – John R. Velazquez (2016, 2023)

Most wins by a trainer

- 2 – Chad C. Brown (2017, 2025)

Most wins by an owner

- No owner has won the event more than once

== Winners ==
Year	Winner	Jockey	Trainer	Owner	Distance	Time	Purse	Grade	Ref
At Saratoga
2025	Zulu Kingdom (IRE)	Flavien Prat	Chad C. Brown	Madaket Stables, Michael Dubb, William Strauss & Michael J. Caruso	1 mile	1:33.11	$200,000	III	
At Aqueduct
2024	Neat	Junior Alvarado	Robert Atras	Red White & Blue Racing	1 mile	1:36.27	$242,500	III	
At Belmont Park
2023	More Than Looks	John R. Velazquez	Cherie DeVaux	Victory Racing Partners	1 mile	1:33.19	$250,000	III	
2022	Annapolis	Irad Ortiz Jr.	Todd A. Pletcher	Bass Racing	1 mile	1:32.81	$100,000	Listed	
2021	Original	James Graham	John P. Terranova	Eric Fein	1 mile	1:37.75	$100,000	Listed	
2020	Race not held								
2019	Win Win Win	Julian Pimentel	Michael J. Trombetta	Live Oak Plantation	1 mile	1:31.56	$100,000		
2018	Up the Ante	Javier Castellano	Christophe Clement	Castleton Lyons	1 mile	1:35.42	$100,000		
2017	Bricks and Mortar	Joel Rosario	Chad C. Brown	Klaravich Stables & William H. Lawrence	1 mile	1:33.12	$100,000		
2016	Giant Run	John R. Velazquez	Thomas Albertrani	Robert C. Baker & William L. Mack	1 mile	1:32.85	$100,000		
2015	Gallery	Jose Lezcano	Michael Dini	Ballybrit Stable	1 mile	1:35.35	$95,000		
2014	Cabo Cat	Joe Bravo	Mark Hennig	R. Lee Lewis	1 mile	1:33.57	$100,000		

== See also ==
- List of American and Canadian Graded races
