= Pennine Ridge Stakes =

- Class: Grade III
- Location: Belmont Park; Elmont, New York, United States
- Inaugurated: 2014
- Race type: Thoroughbred – Flat racing – Inner Turf
- Website: nyra.com

Race information
- Distance: 1 1/8 miles
- Surface: Turf
- Track: Left-handed
- Qualification: Three-years-olds
- Weight: 124 lbs with allowances
- Purse: $300,000 (since 2025)
- Bonuses: First three placegetters invited to Belmont Derby

The Pennine Ridge Stakes is a Grade III American Thoroughbred horse race for horses aged three years old over a distance of one and one-eighth miles on the inner turf held annually in late May or early June at Belmont Park in Elmont, New York. The event currently carries a purse of $300,000.

== History ==
The race was inaugurated in 2014 with a stakes purse of $200,000.

In 2016 the event was classified as Grade III.

The race is named after the Graded stakes winner Pennine Ridge who in 1994 won the Jamaica Handicap, Hill Prince Stakes and Choice Handicap.

The event is considered a preparatory race for the Belmont Derby which is held in July.

In 2020 due to the COVID-19 pandemic in the United States, NYRA schedule the event at a shorter distance of one mile.

In 2021 the event was moved off the turf due to the inclement weather which affected the turf course. Subsequently the event was downgraded to Grade III.

In 2024 the event was moved to Aqueduct Racetrack due to infield tunnel and redevelopment work at Belmont Park.

The race was moved to Saratoga Racecourse in 2025 and was downgraded by the Thoroughbred Owners and Breeders Association to Grade III status and was downgraded one more level as a consequence of being moved off the turf and held on the dirt track.

== Records ==
Speed record:

- 1:45.78 – Catholic Boy (2018)

Largest margin of victory:

- 4 1/2 lengths – Decorated Invader (2020)

Most wins by a jockey:

- 3 – Irad Ortiz Jr. (2016, 2022, 2023)
- 3 – Joel Rosario (2020, 2021, 2024)

Most wins by a trainer:

- 4 – Todd A. Pletcher (2014, 2021, 2022, 2025)

Most wins by an owner:

- 2 – WinStar Farm (2021, 2022)
- 2 – Siena Farm (2018, 2022)
- 2 – Robert LaPenta (2018, 2023)
- 2 – Madaket Stables (2018, 2023)

== Winners ==
Year	Winner	Jockey	Trainer	Owner	Distance	Time	Purse	Grade	Ref
At Saratoga
2026	West End Kid	Tyler Gaffalione	William Walden	Mo Speed Racing	1 1/16 miles	1:40.94	$300,000	III	
2025	A. P. Kid	John R. Velazquez	Todd A. Pletcher	Donegal Racing	1 mile	1:36.83	$300,000	Listed	Off turf
At Aqueduct
2024	Legend of Time (GB)	Joel Rosario	Charlie Appleby	Godolphin Racing	1 1/8 miles	1:47.73	$200,000	II	
At Belmont Park
2023	Kalik	Irad Ortiz Jr.	Chad C. Brown	Robert LaPenta, eFive Racing Thoroughbreds and Madaket Stables	1 1/8 miles	1:47.85	$200,000	II	
2022	Emmanuel	Irad Ortiz Jr.	Todd A. Pletcher	WinStar Farm & Siena Farm	1 1/8 miles	1:51.11	$200,000	II	
2021	Sainthood	Joel Rosario	Todd A. Pletcher	WinStar Farm & China Horse Club	1 1/8 miles	1:50.57	$194,000	III	Off turf
2020	Decorated Invader	Joel Rosario	Christophe Clement	West Point Thoroughbreds	1 mile	1:33.66	$150,000	II	
2019	Demarchelier (GB)	Javier Castellano	Chad C. Brown	Peter M. Brant	1 1/8 miles	1:48.20	$200,000	III	
2018	Catholic Boy	Javier Castellano	Jonathan Thomas	Robert LaPenta, Madaket Stables, Siena Farm, Twin Creeks Racing Stable	1 1/8 miles	1:45.78	$196,000	III	
2017	Oscar Performance	José L. Ortiz	Brian A. Lynch	Amerman Racing Stables (Jerry & Joan Amerman)	1 1/8 miles	1:48.44	$200,000	III	
2016	Camelot Kitten	Irad Ortiz Jr.	Chad C. Brown	Kenneth and Sarah Ramsey	1 1/8 miles	1:47.49	$200,000	III	
2015	Divisidero	Rafael Manuel Hernandez	William B. Bradley	Gunpowder Farms	abt. 1 1/8 miles	1:48.03	$200,000		
2014	Gala Award	John R. Velazquez	Todd A. Pletcher	Derrick Smith, Mrs. John Magnier & Michael Tabor	1 1/8 miles	1:49.73	$200,000		

Legend:
Dirt Turf

== See also ==
- List of American and Canadian Graded races
