= Pilgrim Stakes =

- Class: Grade II
- Location: Belmont Park; Elmont, New York, United States
- Inaugurated: 1979 (at Aqueduct Racetrack)
- Race type: Thoroughbred – Flat racing
- Website: NYRA

Race information
- Distance: 1 1/16 miles
- Surface: Turf
- Track: Left-handed
- Qualification: Two-year-olds
- Weight: 122 lbs with allowances
- Purse: $200,000 (2021)
- Bonuses: Winner receives automatic entrance to the Breeders' Cup Juvenile Turf

The Pilgrim Stakes is a Grade II American Thoroughbred horse race for two-year-olds over a distance of 1 1/16 miles on the turf track scheduled annually in late September at Belmont Park in Elmont, New York. The event currently offers a purse of $200,000.

== History ==
The event was inaugurated on 29 October 1979 at Aqueduct Racetrack and was run over the 1 1/8 mile distance in split divisions as the sixth and eighth race on the card that day.

The race is named for Joseph E. Widener's horse, Pilgrim, winner of the 1919 Remsen Stakes.

In 1982 the event was classified as Grade III, upgraded to Grade II in 1988 for two runnings before being downgraded to Grade III. From 2001–2007 the race was not graded as in 2009 when the event was moved off the turf track due to the inclement weather and held over a shorter one mile distance.

The event was run in two divisions in the above mentioned inaugural 1979 and again in 1983.

The distance of the event has been changed several times but since 2010 the event has been run over the current distance of 1 1/16 miles.

The race was part of the Breeders' Cup Challenge series from 2008 to 2010, when the winner automatically qualified for the Breeders' Cup Juvenile Turf.

The event was upgraded to a Grade III event in 2020.

In 2022 the event was moved to Aqueduct Racetrack due to infield tunnel and redevelopment work at Belmont Park.

== Records ==
Speed record:

- 1 1/16 miles: 1:41.04 – Annapolis (2021)
- 1 1/8 miles: 1:48.02 – Volponi (2000)

Margins:

- 12 lengths – Diplomatic Jet (1994)

Most wins by an owner:

- 2 – Live Oak Racing (1981, 2001)

Most wins by a jockey:

- 5 – John Velazquez (1998, 1999, 2000, 2003, 2007)

Most wins by a trainer:

- 6 – Todd A. Pletcher (2007, 2009, 2017, 2021, 2022, 2023)

== Winners ==
Year	Winner	Jockey	Trainer	Owner	Distance	Time	Purse	Grade	Ref
At Belmont - Pilgrim Stakes
2026	Let Em Know	Edgard J. Zayas	D. Whitworth Beckman	Anthony Tate, Robert J. Ogilvie, Joe Pickerrell and Diamond T Racing	1 1/16 miles	1:42.15	$250,000	II	
At Aqueduct
2025	Bottas	Manuel Franco	Miguel Clement	Dahman	1 1/16 miles	1:42.63	$200,000	II	
2024	Zulu Kingdom (IRE)	Joel Rosario	Chad C. Brown	Michael Dubb, Madaket Stables, William Strauss & Michael J. Caruso	1 1/16 miles	1:48.67	$200,000	II	
2023	Agate Road	Irad Ortiz Jr.	Todd A. Pletcher	Repole Stable & St. Elias Stable	1 1/16 miles	1:42.83	$200,000	II	
2022	Major Dude	Irad Ortiz Jr.	Todd A. Pletcher	Spendthrift Farm	1 1/16 miles	1:46.60	$200,000	II	
At Belmont Park
2021	Annapolis	Irad Ortiz Jr.	Todd A. Pletcher	Bass Racing	1 1/16 miles	1:41.04	$186,000	II	
2020	Fire At Will	Kendrick Carmouche	Michael J. Maker	Three Diamonds Farm	1 1/16 miles	1:43.46	$150,000	II	
2019	Structor	Irad Ortiz Jr.	Chad C. Brown	Jeff Drown & Don Rachel	1 1/16 miles	1:41.46	$200,000	III	
2018	Forty Under	Manuel Franco	Jeremiah C. Englehart	August Dawn Farm	1 1/16 miles	1:44.37	$200,000	III	
2017	Seabhac	Luis Saez	Todd A. Pletcher	Donegal Racing	1 1/16 miles	1:43.48	$200,000	III	
2016	Oscar Performance	José L. Ortiz	Brian A. Lynch	Amerman Racing (Jerry & Joan Amerman)	1 1/16 miles	1:42.88	$200,000	III	
2015	Isotherm	Jose Lezcano	George Weaver	Matthew Schera	1 1/16 miles	1:41.98	$200,000	III	
2014	Imperia	Javier Castellano	Kiaran P. McLaughlin	Godolphin Racing	1 1/16 miles	1:41.36	$200,000	III	
2013	Bobby's Kitten	Javier Castellano	Chad C. Brown	Kenneth and Sarah Ramsey	1 1/16 miles	1:42.37	$200,000	III	
2012	Noble Tune	Ramon A. Dominguez	Chad C. Brown	Martin S. Schwartz & Dell Ridge Farm	1 1/16 miles	1:47.81	$150,000	III	
2011	Shkspeare Shaliyah	Alex O. Solis	Doodnauth Shivmangal	Shivmangal Racing Stable	1 1/16 miles	1:51.59	$100,000	III	
2010	Air Support	Rajiv Maragh	Claude R. McGaughey III	Stuart S. Janney III	1 1/16 miles	1:47.87	$147,500	III	
2009	Eskendereya	Javier Castellano	Todd A. Pletcher	Zayat Stables	1 mile	1:37.85	$152,500	Listed	Off turf
2008	Elusive Bluff	Michael C. Baze	Eric J. Guillot	Southern Equine Stable	1 1/16 miles	1:47.91	$156,800	III	
2007	The Leopard	John R. Velazquez	Todd A. Pletcher	Derrick Smith, Mrs. John Magnier & Michael Tabor	1 1/16 miles	1:41.61	$81,000	Listed	
2006	Pickapocket	Eibar Coa	Frank A. Alexander	Martin Cherry	1 1/8 miles	1:52.62	$85,925	Listed	
2005	Fagan's Legacy	Joe Bravo	Kelly J. Breen	George & Lori Hall	1 1/8 miles	1:52.11	$82,575	Listed	Off turf
2004	Crown Point	Jose L. Espinoza	David G. Donk	Drumlanrig Farm	1 1/8 miles	1:50.31	$82,875	Listed	
2003	Timo	John R. Velazquez	William Badgett Jr.	C. K. Woods Stable	1 1/8 miles	1:57.46	$82,525	Listed	
At Aqueduct
2002	One Colony	Aaron Gryder	Mark A. Hennig	Edward P. Evans	1 1/8 miles	1:51.00	$82,950	Listed	Off turf
2001	Miesque's Approval	Jerry D. Bailey	William I. Mott	Live Oak Racing	1 1/8 miles	1:50.80	$83,475	Listed	
At Belmont Park
2000	Volponi	John R. Velazquez	Philip G. Johnson	Amherst & Spruce Pond	1 1/8 miles	1:48.02	$113,300	III	
1999	Kachemak Bay	John R. Velazquez	John P. Campo Jr.	Evelyn M. Pollard	1 1/8 miles	1:54.67	$111,600	III	
1998	Incurable Optimist	John R. Velazquez	David G. Donk	John T. & Theresa E. Behrendt	1 1/8 miles	1:48.05	$108,100	III	
At Aqueduct
1997	§ Cryptic Rascal	Mike E. Smith	William Badgett Jr.	Landon Knight	1 1/8 miles	1:50.83	$115,700	III	
At Belmont Park
1996	Accelerator	Mike E. Smith	Claude R. McGaughey III	Ogden Mills Phipps	1 1/16 miles	1:41.80	$113,800	III	Off turf
At Aqueduct
1995	Play It Again Stan	Herb McCauley	Frank A. Generazio Jr.	Sybil Lauren	1 1/16 miles	1:50.20	$115,900	III	
At Belmont Park
1994	Diplomatic Jet	Jerry D. Bailey	Philip M. Serpe	Fred W. Hooper	1 1/16 miles	1:46.67	$82,076	III	
1993	§ Dove Hunt	Jerry D. Bailey	Neil J. Howard	William S. Farish III	1 1/16 miles	1:44.60	$122,600	III	
1992	§ Awad	Julie Krone	David G. Donk	Ryehill Stable	1 1/16 miles	1:42.60	$127,000	III	
1991	Smiling and Dancin	Richard Migliore	Stephen L. DiMauro	Robert J. Sullivan	1 1/16 miles	1:41.20	$122,800	III	
At Aqueduct
1990	Fourstars Allstar	Mike E. Smith	Leo O'Brien	Richard Bromze	1 1/8 miles	1:51.60	$90,000	III	
1989	Super Mario	Richard Migliore	D. Wayne Lukas	H. Joseph Allen	1 1/8 miles	1:56.00	$126,800	II	
1988	Tuneful Tip	Carl Gambardella	Ronald J. Dandy	Frank Generazio	1 1/8 miles	1:59.00	$132,200	II	
1987	Blew by Em	Chris Antley	Michael H. Daggett	Joseph B. Singer	1 1/8 miles	1:53.60	$92,850	III	
1986	§ David's Bird	Jean-Luc Samyn	Philip G. Johnson	Sugar Maple Farm	1 1/8 miles	1:53.00	$97,950	III	
1985	Pillaster	Ángel Cordero Jr.	LeRoy Jolley	Peter M. Brant	1 1/8 miles	1:54.40	$89,550	III	
1984	Tent Up	Vincent Bracciale Jr.	John W. Hicks	Geoffrey A. Huguely	1 1/8 miles	1:53.20	$94,500	III	
1983	Pied A' Tierre	Larry Saumell	Ronald L. Benshoff	Blanche P. Levy	1 1/8 miles	1:51.40	$54,700	III	†Division 1
1983	Vision	Eddie Maple	Woodford C. Stephens	Claiborne Farm	1 1/8 miles	1:50.20	$54,700	III	†Division 2
1982	Fortnightly	Ángel Cordero Jr.	Edward I. Kelly Jr.	Bwamazon Farm	1 1/8 miles	1:57.60	$85,800	III	
1981	Gnome's Gold	Jean-Luc Samyn	Patrick J. Kelly	Live Oak Racing	1 1/8 miles	1:57.20	$84,300		
1980	Akureyri	Eddie Maple	Woodford C. Stephens	Hickory Tree Stable	1 1/8 miles	1:54.80	$58,400		
1979	Freeo	Sam Maple	Joseph B. Cantey	Loblolly Stable	1 1/8 miles	1:53.00	$42,850		Division 1
1979	I Take All	Ángel Cordero Jr.	Edward I. Kelly Sr.	Brookfield Farm	1 1/8 miles	1:52.40	$43,050		Division 2

Legend:
Dirt Turf
Notes:
§ Ran as an entry
† Both divisions of the event were moved off the turf and onto the main track due to the inclement weather

== See also ==
List of American and Canadian Graded races
