= Oscar Performance =

American-bred Thoroughbred racehorse

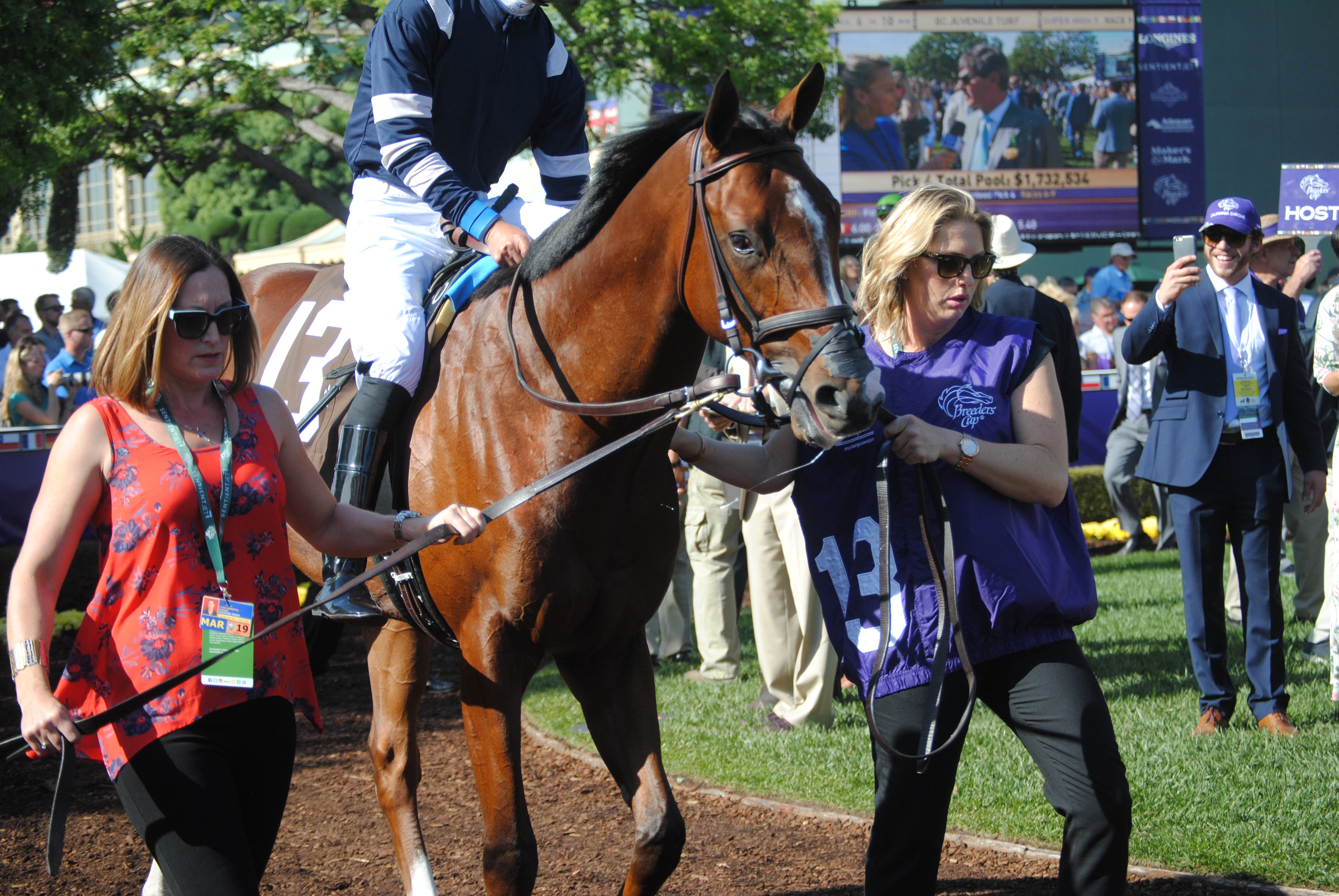
- Oscar Performance before the 2016 Breeders' Cup Juvenile Turf
- Sire: Kitten's Joy
- Grandsire: El Prado
- Dam: Devine Actress
- Damsire: Theatrical
- Sex: Stallion
- Foaled: April 6, 2014
- Country: United States
- Colour: Bay
- Breeder: Joan Amerman
- Owner: Amerman Racing, LLC
- Trainer: Brian A. Lynch
- Record: 15: 8–0–1
- Earnings: $2,345,696

Major wins
- Pilgrim Stakes (2016); Breeders' Cup Juvenile Turf (2016); Pennine Ridge Stakes (2017); Belmont Derby (2017); Secretariat Stakes (2017); Poker Stakes (2018); Woodbine Mile (2018)
- Last updated on November 20, 2018

Oscar Performance (foaled April 6, 2014) is a retired American Thoroughbred racehorse and sire who won the Breeders' Cup Juvenile Turf at age two. After losing his first two starts at age three, he rebounded to win the next three, including the Grade I Belmont Derby and Secretariat Stakes. He then finished third in the Joe Hirsch Turf Classic before finishing ninth in the Breeders' Cup Turf. After recovering from a bout of colic, he made his four-year-old debut in June 2018 in the Poker Stakes, winning in track-record time. In his next start as the favorite in the Arlington Million, he was pulled up after taking a bad step, but he rebounded to win the Woodbine Mile in September.

== Background ==
Oscar Performance was foaled in Kentucky at Mill Ridge Farm. He was bred by Mrs. Jerry Amerman and races for Amerman Racing, owned by Amerman and her husband John. Oscar Performance was sired by Kitten's Joy, the U.S. Champion Male Turf Horse of 2004 whose wins included the Secretariat Stakes and Joe Hirsch Turf Classic, plus a second place in the Breeders' Cup Turf. Unusually for a leading North American sire, his best offspring are also turf specialists, including Big Blue Kitten, Bobby's Kitten, Real Solution and Stephanie's Kitten. Oscar Performance's dam, Devine Actress, was a stakes winner for Amerman Racing who had previously produced a stakes winning full brother to Oscar Performance named Oscar Nominated.

"I remember him as a very attractive foal, the kind that you hope for", said Headley Bell of Mill Ridge Farm. "He continued to go that way as he grew. He was more of an alpha, but he stayed out of trouble."

Oscar Performance was trained by Brian A. Lynch.

== Racing career ==
=== 2016: two-year-old season ===
Oscar Performance made his first start on the turf course at Saratoga in a maiden special weight race on July 23, 2016, finishing fifth after trailing the field early and making a mild rally in the stretch. In his second start on August 20, he instead went to the early lead and continued to draw away from the field, eventually winning by 10 1/4 lengths. The performance caught the attention of many turf writers, earning him the "TDN Rising Star" designation from the Thoroughbred Daily News.

Oscar Performance made his graded stakes debut at Belmont Park on October 1 in the Grade III Pilgrim Stakes. Over a yielding turf course, he went to the lead and set a comfortable pace before kicking clear in the stretch to win by six lengths. The win earned Oscar Performance a berth in the Breeders' Cup Juvenile Turf, where he was made the 6–1 third choice in the betting. He settled in second behind a strong early pace set by Wellabled, then moved to the lead on the far turn. Down the stretch, he opened up a comfortable lead then withstood a late run by Lancaster Bomber to win by 1 1/4 lengths. It was the first win at the Breeders' Cup for Lynch and jockey José Ortiz.

=== 2017: three-year-old season ===
Oscar Performance was given some time off then resumed workouts in February 2017. He made his first start as a three-year-old on April 7 in the Transylvania Stakes at Keeneland. He tracked the early pace in third place but lacked his usual response when asked to run in the stretch and finished third. In his next start in the American Stakes at Churchill Downs, he faded to last after setting the early pace. Lynch later attributed the losses to the soft turf courses in Kentucky that spring. John Amerman also thought that the colt did not respond well to the raceday medication Lasix (furosemide), which was administered for the first and only time before the American Stakes.

Oscar Performance returned to form on June 3 in the Pennine Ridge Stakes at Belmont Park, where he took the lead soon after the start and won by 1 1/2 lengths. He put in a similar performance when winning the Belmont Derby on July 8 by two lengths in front running fashion. In his next start in the Secretariat Stakes at Arlington Park on August 12, he faced a strong field including three European challengers and several local stakes winners. This time, he stalked the early pace set by Sonic Boom and then drew off in the stretch to win by 2 1/4 lengths. "You're never confident until the finish line, but they were very good horses", said John Amerman. "We're delighted Jose [Ortiz] could ride so well and beat them."

On September 30, he faced older horses for the first time in the Joe Hirsch Turf Classic at a distance of 1 1/2 miles. He raced close to the early pace set by Converge but could not match the finishing kick of Beach Patrol and finished third. He faced even more daunting competition in the Breeders' Cup Turf on November 4, where the European contingent included defending champion Highland Reel. Oscar Performance's best strategy was summed up by sportswriter Steve Haskin as "go to the front and let him run." Oscar Performance set a moderate pace for the first mile, tracked by Beach Patrol and Highland Reel. Turning for home, Beach Patrol launched his bid and passed Oscar Performance in mid stretch, only to be passed near the wire by longshot Talismanic. Oscar Performance weakened in the last furlong to finish ninth.

=== 2018: four-year-old season ===
Oscar Performance's return to the track was delayed by a bout of colic. He made his four-year-old debut on June 17, 2018, in the Poker Stakes at Belmont Park, where he stalked the early pace, started his move on the final turn, and pulled away down the stretch to win by 1 1/2 lengths. His time for the one-mile race was 1:31.23, breaking the track record set by Elusive Quality in 1998. "Absolutely thrilled with his comeback effort," said Lynch. "He did it with authority and came back with a very fast time. That's a long-standing track record to break, so to have him do that off the layoff makes you look forward to the rest of the year." The time also tied the North American record set by Mandurah at Monmouth Park in 2010.

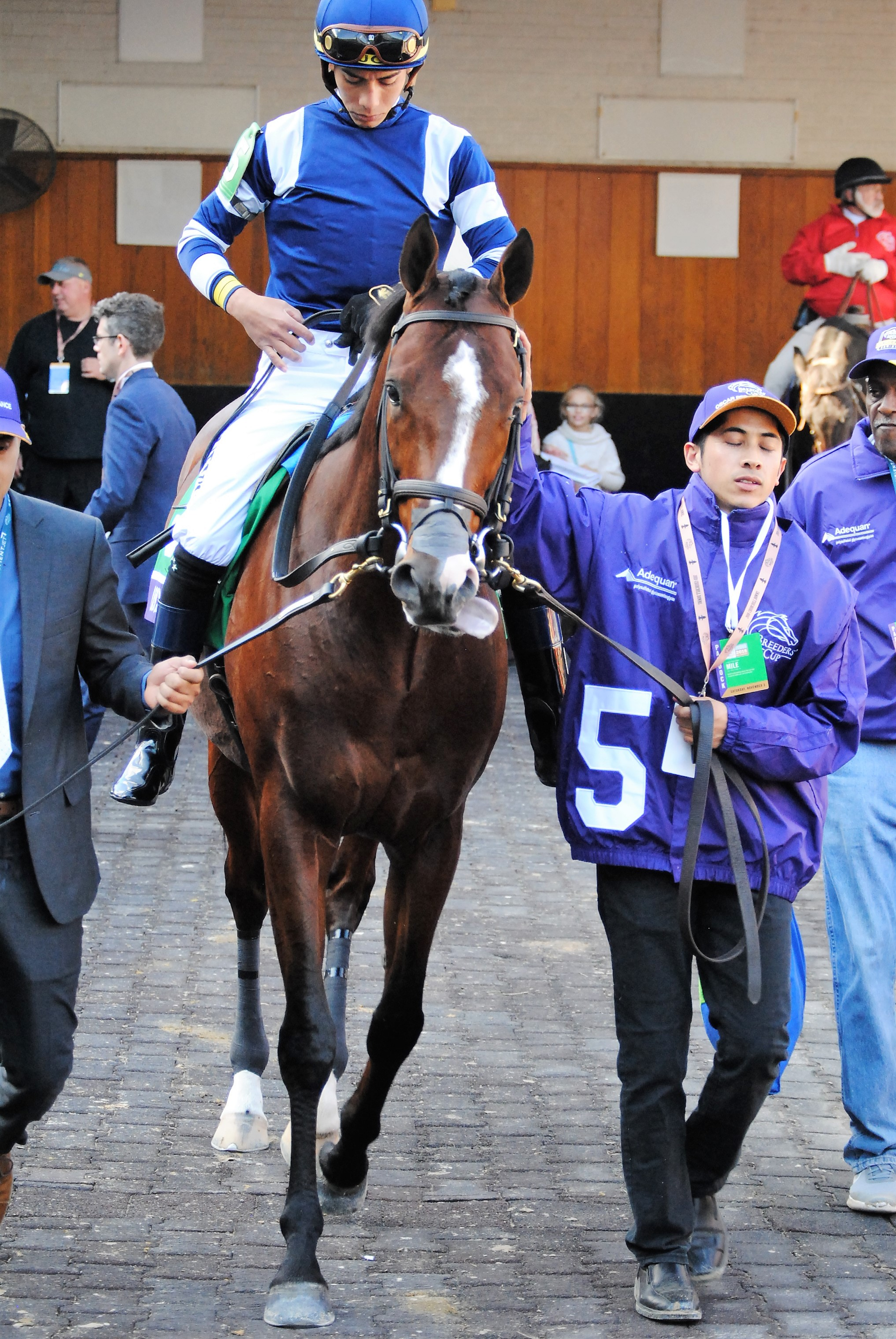
Oscar Performance at the 2018 Breeders' Cup

Oscar Performance made his next step on August 11 in the Arlington Million, going off as the 2-1 favorite. He broke slowly and settled into third place during the early running. Around the far turn, he was bumped by Robert Bruce, the eventual race winner, then recovered his stride and started to make up ground. However, he slowed during the stretch drive after taking a bad step and was pulled up by Ortiz. He walked into the track ambulance without evident distress and subsequently checked out sound.

On September 15, Oscar Performance entered the Woodbine Mile in Toronto. The field included several well-regarded shippers from across North America and Europe, but Oscar Performance was left as the sole speed horse in the field when La Sardane scratched. After breaking slowly, Ortiz urged him to the lead, then slowed down the pace, completing the first half mile in 48.78 seconds. Ortiz then released Oscar Performance, who ran the second half mile in 44.44 seconds on his way to victory. "I was really emotional past the wire because this is one of my favorite horses," said Ortiz. "He gave me my first Breeders' Cup win and to see him last time loading up back to the barn was painful for me. I'm just very happy he's back and back on form that is at the highest level."

The Woodbine Mile provided a "Win and You're In" berth in the Breeders' Cup Mile, held November 3 at Churchill Downs. Oscar Performance broke slowly and was never a factor in the race, finishing last in the field of fourteen.

== Stud ==
Oscar Performance was retired to stud at Mill Ridge Farm, where he stood in the 2019 season for $20,000. For 2024 the stud fee for Oscar Performance was increased to $25,000.

=== Notable progeny ===
c = colt, f = filly, g = gelding

Foaled	Name	Sex	Major Wins
2021	Trikari	c	Belmont Derby
2021	Endlessly	c	Jeff Ruby Steaks
2022	World Beater	c	Saratoga Derby

== Pedigree ==
Pedigree of Oscar Performance, bay colt, 2014
Sire Kitten's Joy 2001	El Prado (IRE); 1989	Sadler's Wells	Northern Dancer
Sire Kitten's Joy 2001	El Prado (IRE); 1989	Sadler's Wells	Fairy Bridge
Sire Kitten's Joy 2001	El Prado (IRE); 1989	Lady Capulet	Sir Ivor
Sire Kitten's Joy 2001	El Prado (IRE); 1989	Lady Capulet	Cap and Bells
Sire Kitten's Joy 2001	Kitten's First (USA); 1991	Lear Fan	Roberto
Sire Kitten's Joy 2001	Kitten's First (USA); 1991	Lear Fan	Wac
Sire Kitten's Joy 2001	Kitten's First (USA); 1991	That's My Hon	L'Enjoleur
Sire Kitten's Joy 2001	Kitten's First (USA); 1991	That's My Hon	One Lane
Dam Devine Actress 2005	Theatrical (IRE); 1982	Nureyev	Northern Dancer
Dam Devine Actress 2005	Theatrical (IRE); 1982	Nureyev	Special
Dam Devine Actress 2005	Theatrical (IRE); 1982	Tree of Knowledge	Sassafras
Dam Devine Actress 2005	Theatrical (IRE); 1982	Tree of Knowledge	Sensibility
Dam Devine Actress 2005	Devine Beauty; 1996	Mr. Prospector	Raise a Native
Dam Devine Actress 2005	Devine Beauty; 1996	Mr. Prospector	Gold Digger
Dam Devine Actress 2005	Devine Beauty; 1996	Magical Holiday	Slew o' Gold
Dam Devine Actress 2005	Devine Beauty; 1996	Magical Holiday	American Drama (Family: 20-b)

- Oscar Performance is inbred 4 × 4 to Northern Dancer, meaning that this stallion appears twice in the fourth generation of his pedigree.
