= Nownownow =

American-bred Thoroughbred racehorse

- Sire: Whywhywhy
- Grandsire: Mr. Greeley
- Dam: Here And Now
- Damsire: Exit To Nowhere
- Sex: Stallion
- Foaled: 2005
- Country: United States
- Color: Bay
- Breeder: Fab Oak Stable
- Owner: Fab Oak Stable
- Trainer: 1) Patrick Biancone (2007); 2) Francois Parisel (2007); 3) David Wachman (2008); 4) Jason Orman (2008); 5) Patrick Biancone (2009)
- Record: 20: 3-4-4
- Earnings: $903,329

Major wins
- With Anticipation Stakes (2007); San Fernando Stakes (2009) Breeders' Cup wins: Breeders' Cup Juvenile Turf (2007)

Nownownow (foaled April 20, 2005 in Kentucky) is an American Thoroughbred racehorse who won the inaugural running of the Breeders' Cup Juvenile Turf in 2007.

== Background ==
Owned and bred by French clothing retailer Fabien Ouaki through his Fab Oak Stable, Nownownow was sired by Ouaki's Grade 1 winner Whywhywhy, a descendant of the American Champion sire, Mr. Prospector. He is out of the French mare Here And Now, a descendant of the French Champion sire, Riverman.

Nownownow was trained by Francois Parisel, who took over conditioning duties after trainer Patrick Biancone was suspended by racing authorities for medication violations.

== Racing career ==
=== 2007: two-year-old season ===
The colt did not get his first win until his fourth start when he won the ungraded With Anticipation Stakes on grass at Saratoga Race Course on August 31, 2007. He entered the Breeders Cup race with that one win from five starts and was made a more than 13-1 longshot by bettors. Racing on a rainy day on a soggy Monmouth Park turf course, Nownownow was ridden by Julien Leparoux. As they headed down the homestretch, Leparoux had Nownownow on the outside and made a powerful run to defeat the betting favorite Achill Island by half a length to capture the $1 million race. The victory gave jockey Leparoux the first Breeders' Cup win of his career.

=== 2008: three-year-old season ===
Nownownow was sent to race on the grass in Europe for 2008 under the care of trainer David Wachman. On May 24, the colt made his three-year-old debut at Ireland's famous Curragh Racecourse in the one mile Group One Irish 2,000 Guineas. Ridden by French jockey Olivier Peslier, Nownownow finished a distant fifth in a five-horse field to Henrythenavigator. Back in the United States with trainer Jason Orman, he then went winless in the La Jolla Handicap (5th), the Del Mar Derby (4th), an Allowance Optional Claiming race (3rd), the Oak Tree Derby (8th), and the Malibu Stakes (6th). In the last race, he rejoined Patrick Biancone, who returned from the suspension.

=== 2009: four-year-old season ===
After adding blinkers that helped him concentrate more in races, Nownownow finally broke his losing streak by winning the San Fernando Stakes at Santa Anita Racetrack on January 17, 2009.

=== Sale for breeding ===
Nownownow was sold for $130,000 at the Novovember 17, 2010 Keeneland breeding stock sale to Richard Giacopelli.
