= Soldat (horse) =

American-bred Thoroughbred racehorse

- Sire: War Front
- Grandsire: Danzig
- Dam: Le Relais
- Damsire: Coronado's Quest
- Sex: Colt
- Foaled: 2008
- Country: United States
- Colour: Bay
- Breeder: Brookfield Stud
- Owner: Harvey Clarke & W. Craig Robertson III
- Trainer: Kiaran McLaughlin
- Record: 12: 4-4-0
- Earnings: US$$622,760

Major wins
- With Anticipation Stakes (2010); Fountain of Youth Stakes (2011)

Soldat (foaled April 19, 2008 in Kentucky) is a dark bay or brown colt by the sire War Front out of a Coronado's Quest mare, Le Relais., and one of the contenders for the 2011 Kentucky Derby.

== Racing career ==
Soldat, meaning "soldier" in French, moved to the forefront of the Kentucky Derby scene after his dominating two-length victory in the Fountain of Youth Stakes G2 on Feb 26, 2011. Before the Fountain of Youth, Soldat had been known for his ability on turf courses and wet tracks, but had never run on a dry dirt track like the one typically run at the Kentucky Derby. He completed the 1 1/8 mile race in a solid time of 1:50 1/5 and defeated two other highly regarded Derby prospects, Gourmet Dinner and To Honor and Serve. Soldat began his three-year-old season with a 10 3/4 length win in an allowance win at Gulfstream Park. The race was originally scheduled to run over the turf, but due to heavy rain it was moved to run over a sloppy dirt track.

Soldat completed a successful juvenile campaign culminating with a solid second in the Breeder's Cup Juvenile Turf Stakes. He also won the With Anticipation Stakes over the Saratoga turf course and placed second in the Pilgrim Stakes over a yielding Belmont turf course. He started his career with back-to-back second-place finishes in New York going very short, 5, and 5 ½ furlongs.

Soldat is trained by Kiaran McLaughlin, ridden by jockey Alan Garcia (with the exception of his first two career races in which he was ridden by Rajiv Maragh), and owned by Harvey Clarke.

Soldat, bred by Brookfield Stud, LLC was foaled in Kentucky in 2008 and sold at the 2009 Keeneland September Yearling Sale for $180,000. He was then pointed to the Florida Derby at Gulfstream Park as his final preparation for the Kentucky Derby. He finished fifth.
