= Breeders' Cup =

World championships of Thoroughbred horse racing

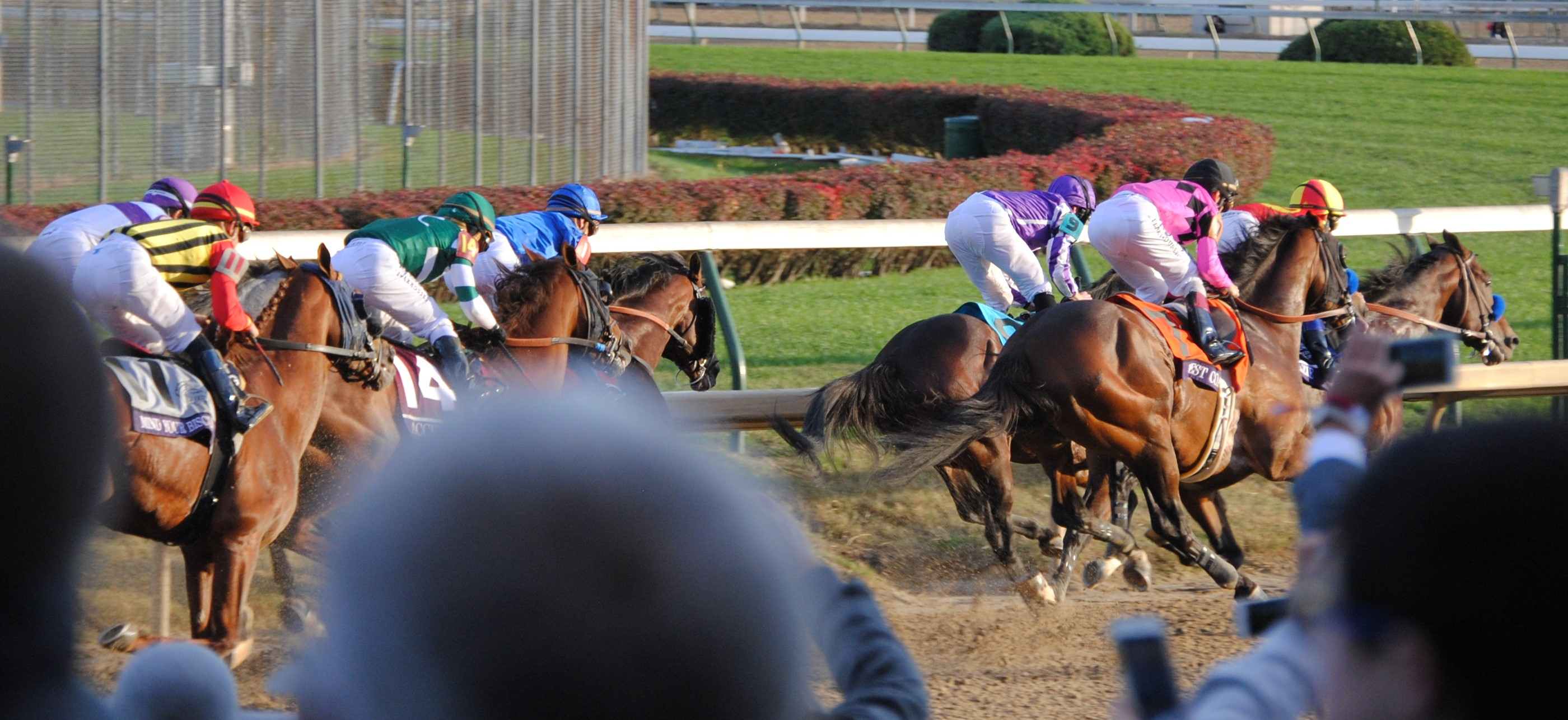
- The 2018 Breeders' Cup Classic at Churchill Downs
- Class: Championship Event Series
- Location: Changes yearly
- Inaugurated: 1984
- Race type: Thoroughbred
- Website: www.breederscup.com

Race information
- Distance: See individual races
- Surface: Turf, Dirt
- Track: Left-handed
- Qualification: See individual races
- Weight: See individual races
- Purse: Varies by race; between $1 million – $7 million

The Breeders' Cup World Championships is an annual series of Grade I Thoroughbred horse races, operated by Breeders' Cup Limited, a company formed in 1982. From its inception in 1984 through 2006, it was a single-day event; starting in 2007, it expanded to two days. All sites have been in the United States, except in 1996, when the races were at the Woodbine Racetrack in Canada.

The attendance at the Breeders' Cup varies. Santa Anita Park set the highest two-day attendance figure of 118,484 in 2016. The lowest two-day attendance was 65,232 in 2025 at Del Mar Thoroughbred Club, aside from the years 2020 and 2021 when the COVID-19 pandemic restricted events in public.

With the addition of three races for 2008, a total of $25.5 million was awarded over the two days, up from $23 million in 2007. With the subsequent removal of two races, the purses for the remaining thirteen races totaled $24.5 million in 2014, plus awards for foal and stallion nominators. Prior to the 2016 running, the total purses were raised from $26 million to $28 million. The purse of the Classic was raised from $5 million to $6 million, and the purse of the Longines Turf was increased from $3 million to $4 million. In 2018, total prizes and awards were increased to over $30 million after another race, the Juvenile Turf Sprint, was added and the purse for the Sprint was increased to $2 million.

Each Breeders' Cup race presents four Breeders' Cup trophies to the connections of the winner and a garland of flowers draped over the withers of the winning horse. Many Breeders' Cup winners will go on to win the Eclipse Award in their respective division. For example, of the eleven flat racehorse categories, seven of the Eclipse winners in 2015 had also won a Breeders' Cup race, while three others were in the money.

In the 2015 listing of the International Federation of Horseracing Authorities (IFHA), three Breeders' Cup races are ranked among the top Grade 1 races in the world: the Classic (4th), the Turf (10th) and the Mile (12th). The Distaff is ranked second among the top Grade 1 races for fillies and mares.

== History ==
=== 1980s-1990s: Founding, early races ===
The event was created as a year-end championship for North American Thoroughbred racing, and also attracts top horses from other parts of the world, especially Europe. The idea for the Breeders' Cup was proposed at the 1982 awards luncheon for the Kentucky Derby Festival by pet food heir John R. Gaines (1928–2005), a leading Thoroughbred owner and breeder who wanted to clean up the sport's image. The Cup was initially faced with much skepticism in the racing community, but with the vocal support of legendary trainer John Nerud and others, the Breeders' Cup was carried out, and subsequently experienced tremendous popularity domestically and abroad.

The prize money is largely supported by nomination fees paid by breeders for stallions and the resultant foals. In North America, participating stud farms pay an annual nomination fee for a given stallions that is equal to the stallion's advertised stud fee, plus an additional amount if the stallion has more than 50 foals in a given year. The cost to nominate a European stallion is 50% of their stud fee, while the nomination fee for a South American stallion is 25% of their stud fee. In North America, the breeders of the resultant foals must also pay a one-time nomination fee (currently $400) by October 15 of the year of birth.

The races are operated by Breeders' Cup Limited, a company formed in 1982. The first event was in 1984. From its inception in 1984 through 2006, it was a single-day event; starting in 2007, it expanded to two days. All sites have been in the United States, except in 1996, when the races were at the Woodbine Racetrack in Canada.

=== 2000–09: Expansion ===
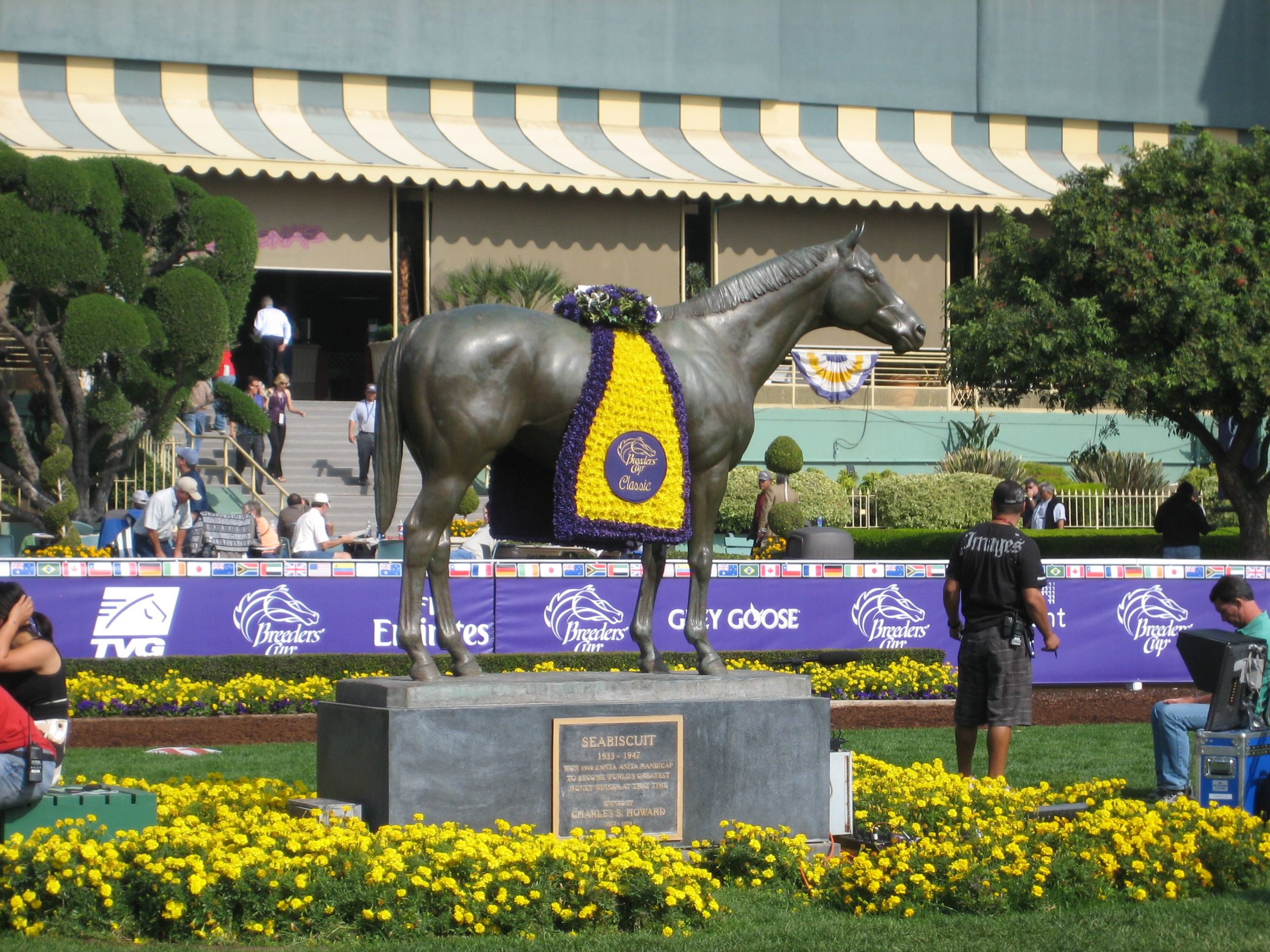
The saddling paddock, decorated for the Breeders' Cup

In 2006 Greg Avioli began serving as interim President and CEO of the Breeders' Cup, and he became the official CEO in April 2007. "This is an exciting time for the Breeders' Cup", said Avioli. "We will continue to focus on growing the international market for our championships, creating a successful two-day event and promoting the Breeders' Cup brand with both our television and sponsorship partners." In 2007, the event was expanded from one to two days and in 2008, the first day was devoted to female horses and the overall purse increased to over $25 million, making it what the New York Post called "the richest turf festival in the world." Before the Breeders' Cup expanded to two days, it was generally considered to be the richest day in sports. Beginning in 2008, the second day of the Breeders' Cup became the second-richest. In 2008, a total of $17 million was awarded on that day, down from $20 million in 2007 (two races were moved from Day 2 to Day 1). The richest single day in sports is now another Thoroughbred racing event, Dubai World Cup Night. It features six races with a combined purse of $21 million in 2008. In 2008, the Breeders' Cup Marathon was added but was dropped in April 2014. 2008 also marked the first time most of the races were run on an artificial surface, instead of the traditional dirt.

On August 11, 2009, the Breeders' Cup announced that it would use the standard colored saddle towel system starting with the 2009 event. The new color-coded system (which has been used at many North American racetracks since the mid-1990s) replaces the standard purple saddle towels which had been used since 1985. The first Breeders' Cup in 1984 used yellow saddle towels.

On October 22, 2009, the Breeders' Cup announced it had signed simulcasting and licensing agreements with Betfair, a company which in turn had purchased the horse-racing network TVG in January of that year. The agreement brought in Betfair's customer base of over 2.5 million, many of whom had legal access to common-pool betting. Betfair handled common-pool wagering at the organization's November 2009 championships, also streaming the events live to both national and international wagerers for the first time. At that point, the World Championship event was being telecast in over 140 countries, through various networks.

The Breeders' Cup also introduced the Breeders' Cup Challenge "Win and You're In" qualifying system, a policy wherein winners of major races throughout the year, from North America, England, Ireland, France, Hong Kong, Japan, South Africa, Australia would gain automatic access to the Breeders' Cup Championships races. Profits for 2010 were the highest in the organization's history, with wagering (both pari-mutuel and non-pari-mutuel) in 2010 nearing $200 million, or $21 million more than the previous year. Over $23 million of the non-pari-mutuel was wagered over Betfair.

=== 2010–19 ===
In 2011, the organization appointed Craig R. Fravel as CEO and President, a role he left after the 2019 event to head the racing operations of the Stronach Group. Also in 2011, the Juvenile Sprint was added, only to be dropped after the 2012 running. Organizers had originally planned to ban raceday use of the anti-bleeding medication furosemide (Lasix) for more consistency with European standards, but reversed the decision due to concerns from horsemen and many handicappers.

From 2008 to 2014, the Breeders' Cup was held at either Churchill Downs or Santa Anita Park, both major tracks with a demonstrated record of success in hosting the event. In 2015 however, Keeneland was selected as the host track for the first time, in large part because of Lexington's position as the center of the North American thoroughbred breeding industry. Although concerns were raised over Keeneland's limited amount of permanent seating, the 2015 event was considered a success, with record Friday attendance and a sell-out on Saturday.

2015 marked the first time a Triple Crown had been won since the inception of the Breeders' Cup, and thus the first opportunity to win the so-called Grand Slam of Thoroughbred racing, consisting of the Triple Crown and Breeders' Cup Classic. American Pharoah completed the feat in a decisive wire to wire victory.

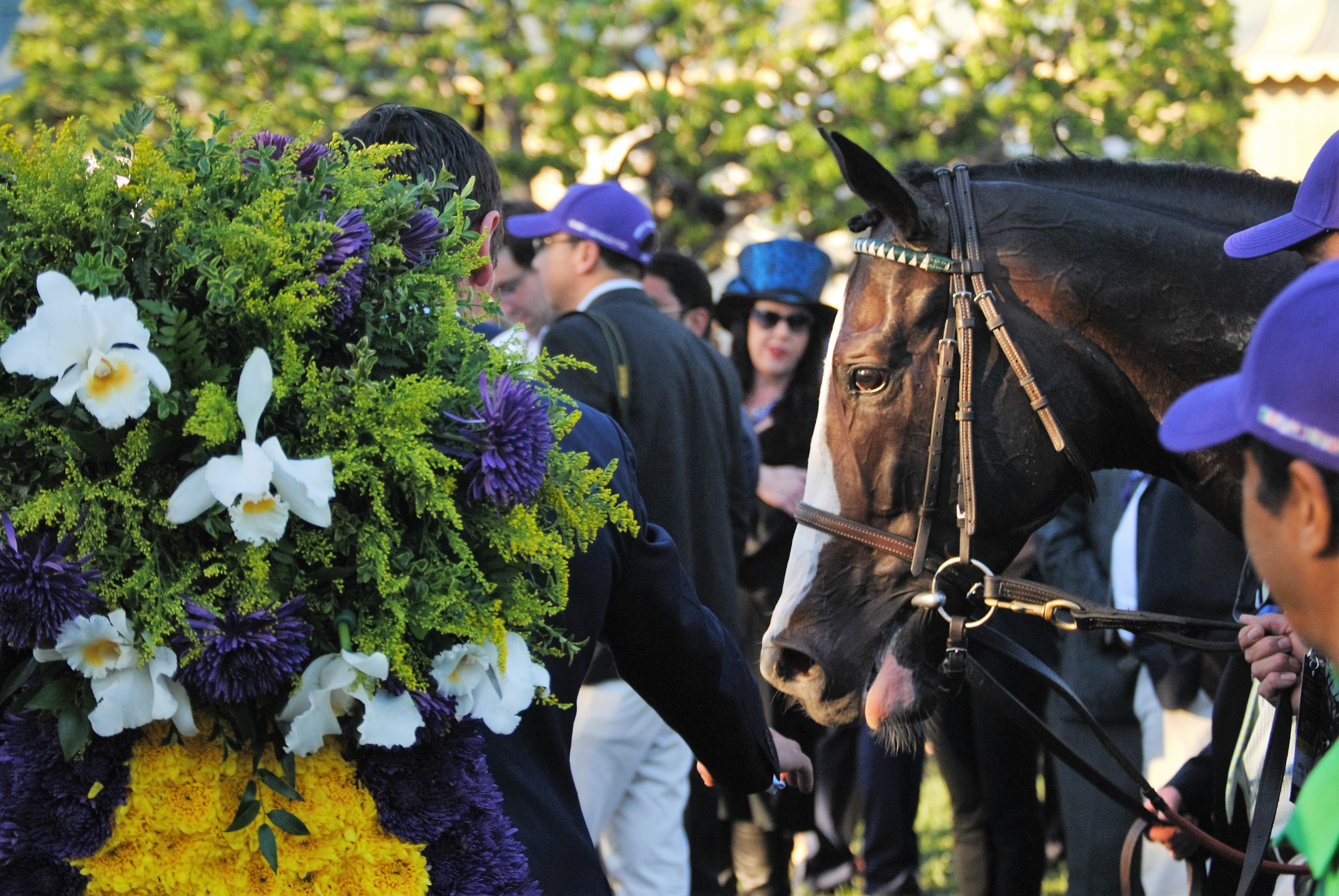
Tourist with the winner's bouquet from the 2016 Breeders' Cup Mile

In 2016, Santa Anita had the record upon hosting the Breeders' Cup for a record ninth time. The 2017 event was held at Del Mar for the first time.

The 2018 event was held at Churchill Downs. For the 2018 event, the Friday card was known as "Future Stars Friday" and featured five races for two-year-olds, including the new Breeders' Cup Juvenile Turf Sprint. The Distaff moved back to the Saturday card. Additional Breeders' Cup changes arrived with the Breeders' Cup Future Wager, similar to the Kentucky Derby Future Wager, and the first time the Equestrian event which was intermingled with Breeders' Cup and Churchill Downs activities.

The 2019 event at Santa Anita Park ended in the death of a popular horse, Mongolian Groom, in the Breeders' Cup Classic. Mongolian Groom suffered a broken lower cannon bone as well as an upper portion of pastern during the race and was euthanized. The accident came after 37 other deaths at Santa Anita Park in less than a year.

== Races ==
=== Current ===
The races currently run are:

- $1 million Breeders' Cup Juvenile Turf (gr. IT)
- $1 million Breeders' Cup Juvenile Fillies Turf (gr. IT)
- $1 million Breeders' Cup Juvenile Turf Sprint (gr. IT)
- $1 million Breeders' Cup Dirt Mile (gr. I)
- $1 million Breeders' Cup Filly & Mare Sprint (gr. I)
- $1 million Breeders' Cup Turf Sprint (gr. IT)
- $2 million Breeders' Cup Sprint (gr. I)
- $2 million Breeders' Cup Mile (gr. IT)
- $2 million Breeders' Cup Distaff (gr. I)
- $2 million Breeders' Cup Juvenile Fillies (gr. I)
- $2 million Breeders' Cup Filly & Mare Turf (gr. IT)
- $2 million Breeders' Cup Juvenile (gr. I)
- $5 million Breeders' Cup Turf (gr. IT)
- $7 million Breeders' Cup Classic (gr. I)

=== Past ===
The following races have been discontinued by the Breeders' Cup:

- Breeders' Cup Marathon** (2008–2013)
- Breeders' Cup Juvenile Sprint (2011–2012)

**The Breeders' Cup Marathon, while no longer run as such, has actually continued to be raced every year as part of the first day of the Breeders' Cup undercard. It was run for several years as the Las Vegas Marathon and in 2022 is being run as the Thoroughbred Aftercare Alliance Stakes. Even as a Breeders' Cup event, the race was never a Grade I race: it was a Grade II event when last run as part of the official Breeders' Cup program in 2013, and has remained a Grade II in its subsequent runnings as a non-Breeders' Cup race.

== Selection process ==
A maximum of 14 starters are allowed in each of the Breeders' Cup Championships races (depending on track dimensions, some races such as the Turf Sprint or Dirt Mile may be limited to 12 starters). Breeders' Cup Limited has adopted a field selection system to select runners in the event that fields are oversubscribed. Winners of the "Win and You're In" Breeders' Cup Challenge races automatically qualify. Other pre-entries are ranked by (1) a point system for graded stakes performance during the year, and (2) the judgment of a panel of racing experts. After pre-entries are taken approximately two weeks before the Breeders' Cup, the ranking determines eligibility in oversubscribed races. After pre-entry, any vacancies in the fields are filled by horses in order of panel preference.

== Details ==
Through 2006, there were eight races on the Breeders' Cup card, all classified as Grade I races. In 2007, three races – the Dirt Mile, Filly and Mare Sprint, and Juvenile Turf – were added, all of them run the Friday before the remaining eight races. Three more new races – a Turf Sprint, Juvenile Filly Turf and Marathon – were added for 2008. A Juvenile Sprint was added for 2011.

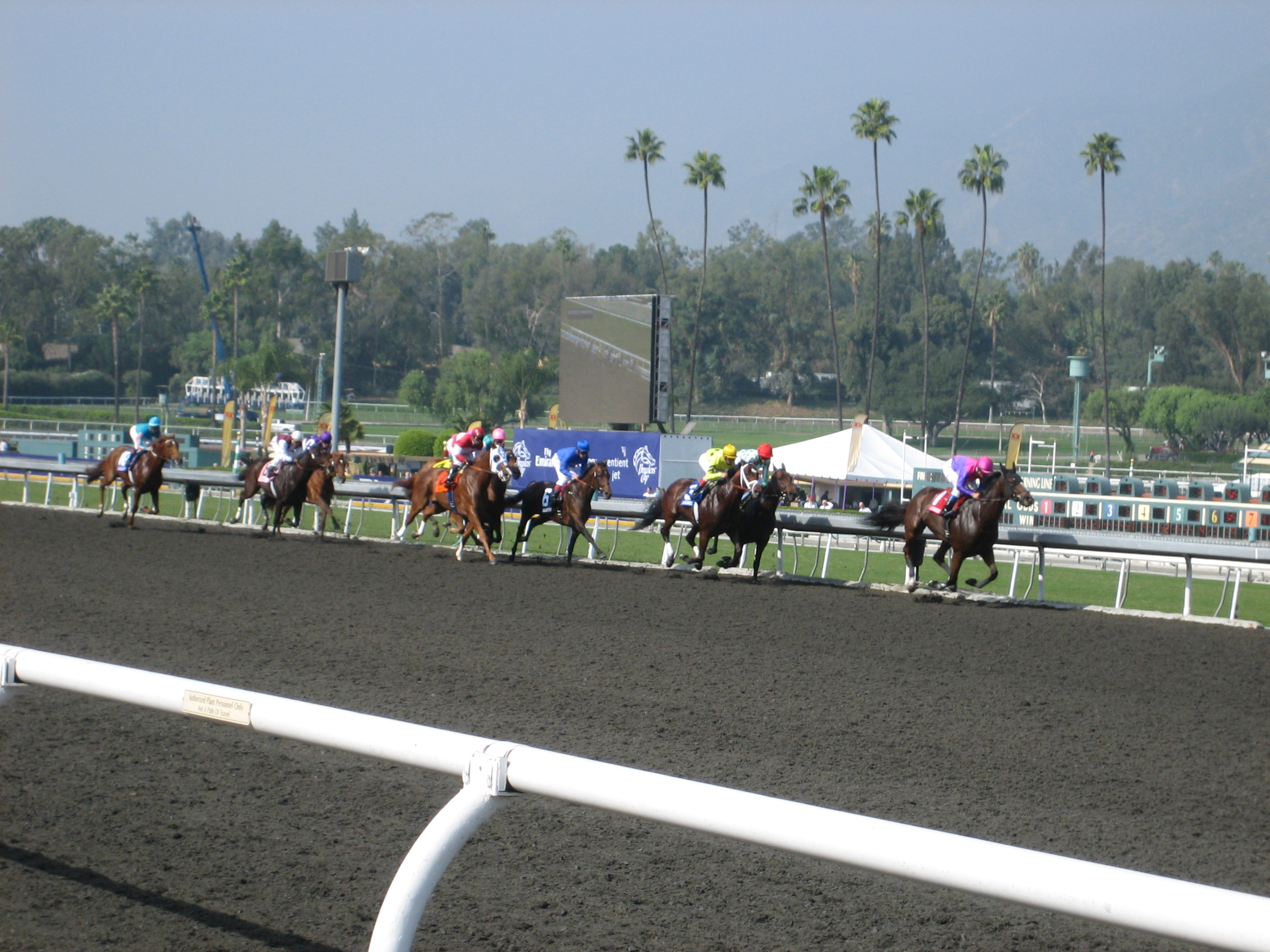
The championship races in 2009 (pictured) were the second year to have a day devoted to female horses. Since 2013, the gender on both days is mixed between races.

The order of the races on the card has changed many times throughout the event's history, but the Turf and Classic are traditionally the last two races. The 2008 event was the first in which Day 1 of the event was dedicated to races for fillies and mares, with Day 2 featuring all other races. For 2009, the Marathon, open to runners of both sexes, was moved from Day 2 to be the opening race on Day 1, but all other races stayed on the day they had been run in 2008. In 2011, the Marathon was moved from Day 1 to Day 2, with the Juvenile Sprint becoming the first race overall (and also the only one on Day 1 open to males). The Marathon returned to Day 1 in 2012. Since 2013, the first day was no longer primarily devoted to races for fillies and mares, with the Dirt Mile and Juvenile Turf moving to Day 1 and the Filly & Mare Sprint and Filly & Mare Turf moving to Day 2.

Two other significant changes were made in 2013. First, the Juvenile Sprint (on dirt) was discontinued after only two runnings. That race had been widely perceived as a consolation prize for horses not good enough to run in the Juvenile. Second, the Ladies' Classic returned to its original name of Distaff. When the latter announcement was made, Breeders' Cup president Craig Fravel said,

We restored the Ladies' Classic to its original name due to feedback from our loyal fans who have a strong affinity for the Distaff. In recognition of our 30th year, the Distaff has provided us with some of racing's most remarkable moments, personified by such outstanding thoroughbreds as Lady's Secret, Personal Ensign, Azeri, Zenyatta, and our two-time defending champion, Royal Delta. It is a fitting tribute to bring back the name Distaff to honor the rich history of the championships.

For 2018, the sprint race for two-year-olds was revived, now on turf as the Juvenile Turf Sprint. According to officials, the turf races for two-year-old horses have more entries than can fit within the Breeders' Cup limit of 12 to 14 horses, so they needed to add the third turf race for two-year-old horses at 5.5 or six furlongs, depending on the track.

== Winners and records ==
=== Most wins and earnings ===
Breeders' Cup wins – jockey:

- Mike Smith – 27
- John R. Velazquez – 20
- Irad Ortiz Jr. – 18
- Ryan Moore - 16
- Jerry Bailey & Joel Rosario Each - 15
- Frankie Dettori – 15

Breeders' Cup wins – trainer:

- Aidan O'Brien – 21
- Bob Baffert - 21
- D. Wayne Lukas – 20
- Chad Brown – 16
- Todd A. Pletcher – 15

Breeders' Cup earnings – owner:

- Juddmonte Farms – $17,135,820
- Godolphin – $15,061,735
- Magnier, Mrs. John, Tabor, Michael and Smith, Derrick – $14,145,725
- Stronach Stables – $8,492,400
- Allen E. Paulson – $6,670,000

Breeders' Cup earnings – breeder:

- Adena Springs – $10,112,400
- Juddmonte Farms – $8,273,820
- Allen E. Paulson – $7,854,800
- Wertheimer et Frère – $6,117,545
- H. H. The Aga Khan – $5,380,400

Breeders' Cup earnings – horse:

- Sierra Leone – $4,830,000
- Zenyatta – $4,680,000
- Tiznow – $4,560,400
- Forever Young (JPN) – $4,270,000
- Authentic – $4,120,000

Breeders' Cup earnings – sire:

- Galileo (IRE) – $13,876,287
- Unbridled's Song – $10,922,400
- Storm Cat – $8,866,300
- Smart Strike – $8,860,160
- Street Cry (IRE) – $7,728,000

Breeders' Cup earnings – dam:

- Cee's Song – $5,360,400
- Vertigineux – $4,680,000
- Flawless - 4,120,000
- Leslie's Lady – $4,010,000
- Born Gold – $3,868,200

=== Repeat winners ===
The following horses have won the same Breeders' Cup race at least twice:

- Classic: Tiznow (2000, 2001)
- Distaff: Bayakoa (1989, 1990), Royal Delta (2011, 2012), Beholder (2013, 2016), Monomoy Girl (2018, 2020)
  - From 2008 to 2012, this race was known as the Ladies' Classic.
- Turf: High Chaparral (2002, 2003), Conduit (2008, 2009)
- Filly & Mare Turf: Ouija Board (2004, 2006)
- Mile: Miesque (1987, 1988), Lure (1992, 1993), Da Hoss (1996, 1998), Goldikova (2008, 2009, 2010), Wise Dan (2012, 2013)
- Dirt Mile: Goldencents (2013, 2014), Cody's Wish (2022, 2023)
- Sprint: Midnight Lute (2007, 2008), Roy H (2017, 2018), Elite Power (2022, 2023)
- Turf Sprint: Mizdirection (2012, 2013), Stormy Liberal (2017, 2018)
- Filly & Mare Sprint: Groupie Doll (2012, 2013), Goodnight Olive (2022, 2023)

The following horses have won two different Breeders' Cup races:

- Zenyatta, Distaff in 2008, Classic in 2009
- Beholder, Juvenile Fillies in 2012, Distaff in 2013 and 2016
- Secret Circle, Juvenile Sprint in 2011, Sprint in 2013
- Stephanie's Kitten, Juvenile Fillies Turf in 2011, Filly and Mare Turf in 2015
- Knicks Go, Dirt Mile in 2020, Classic in 2021
- Golden Pal, Juvenile Turf Sprint in 2020, Turf Sprint in 2021
- Modern Games, Juvenile Turf in 2021, Mile in 2022

The following horses have won three Breeders' Cup races:

- Goldikova, Mile 2008, 2009 and 2010
- Beholder, Juvenile Fillies 2012, Distaff 2013 and 2016

=== Miscellaneous ===
Largest margins of victory:

- 13.5 lengths – Inside Information: 1995 Distaff
- 10 lengths – Street Sense: 2006 Juvenile

As of 2025, the following countries have produced Breeders' Cup winners:

- United States – 323
- Ireland – 49
- Great Britain – 32
- France – 9
- Argentina – 7
- Canada – 7
- Japan – 4
- Germany – 1

Oldest horse to win a Breeders’ Cup race: Calidoscopio (Arg) 9 Years Old (2012 Marathon)

Oldest trainer to win a Breeders’ Cup race: D. Wayne Lukas (79) Take Charge Brandi (2014 Juvenile Fillies)

Youngest trainer to win a Breeders’ Cup race: Joseph O’Brien (26) Iridessa (2019 Filly & Mare Turf)

Oldest jockey to win a Breeders’ Cup race: Bill Shoemaker (56) Ferdinand (1987 Classic)

Youngest jockey to win a Breeders’ Cup race: Joseph O’Brien (18) St Nicholas Abbey (IRE) (2011 Turf)

As of 2019, favorites have won 107 of 346 Breeders' Cup races, a 31 percent strike rate. Of the 346 favorites, 65 were odds-on choices with 28 of them winning.

The biggest longshot to win a Breeders' Cup race was Arcangues at 133.60-1, in the 1993 Classic.

== Women in the Breeders' Cup ==
=== Jockeys ===
The 1988 Breeders' Cup marked the first time a woman jockey competed, as American Julie Krone rode in three races that day; the Juvenile Fillies, the Juvenile and the Classic finishing 2nd, 6th and 4th respectively. Krone also became the first woman to win when she guided Halfbridled to a historic victory in the 2003 edition of the Juvenile Fillies. Rosie Napravnik became the second woman jockey to win a Breeders' Cup race, winning the Juvenile in 2012 on Shanghai Bobby and the Distaff in 2014 on Untapable.

=== Trainers ===
Six women trainers have won Breeders' Cup races, the first in 1996 when Jenine Sahadi won the Breeders' Cup Sprint with Lit de Justice. In 2009, Carla Gaines also won the Sprint with Dancing in Silks and in 2013 Kathy Ritvo became the first woman to train a Classic winner, Mucho Macho Man. Jo Hughes became the first woman trainer from Britain to win a race at the Breeders' Cup with London Bridge in 2013. Most recently, Maria Borell saddled 2015 Sprint winner Runhappy.

== Television ==
NBC broadcast the Breeders' Cup from its inception in 1984 through 2005. In 2006, ESPN took over the television contract for eight years through 2013. However, in January 2012 the Breeders' Cup announced a new contract with NBC Sports, superseding the final two years of the ESPN contract. Beginning in 2012, the Breeders' Cup would be broadcast in its entirety on NBCSN, except for the Classic which would be televised by NBC. In 2014, NBC announced a 10-year extension of their media rights to the Breeders' Cup. In 2015, NBC Sports announced a 3-year extension of their partnership to broadcast events from the Breeders' Cup Challenge series.

The Breeders' Cup races were called by Tom Durkin from 1984 through 2005, and by Trevor Denman from 2006 to 2012. The Breeders' Cup has used two announcers in recent years, with Larry Collmus calling the races for the network shows, and the host track's announcer calling for the regular in-house and simulcast feeds.

== Race tracks ==
The Breeders' Cup is held at different racetracks. Santa Anita Park has hosted the event more than any other track — it hosted its 11th Breeders' Cup in 2023. Churchill Downs has hosted nine times. Belmont Park and Keeneland have hosted the series four times, and Gulfstream Park and Hollywood Park each hosted the meet three times. Woodbine Racetrack, in Toronto, hosted the only Breeders Cup that has been held outside the U.S.

Since 2008 the Breeders' Cup has rotated exclusively between two tracks in California (Santa Anita and Del Mar) and two in Kentucky (Churchill Downs and Keeneland). Del Mar hosted the Breeders' Cup in 2024 and 2025, marking the first time the event had been held in consecutive years at a single location since Santa Anita held the event in 2012, 2013 and 2014.

Past and future Breeders' Cup sites:

- 2027 – Belmont Park
- 2026 − Keeneland
- 2025 − Del Mar Thoroughbred Club
- 2024 − Del Mar Thoroughbred Club
- 2023 − Santa Anita Park
- 2022 − Keeneland
- 2021 − Del Mar Thoroughbred Club
- 2020 − Keeneland
- 2019 – Santa Anita Park
- 2018 – Churchill Downs
- 2017 − Del Mar Thoroughbred Club
- 2016 − Santa Anita Park
- 2015 − Keeneland
- 2014 – Santa Anita Park
- 2013 – Santa Anita Park
- 2012 – Santa Anita Park
- 2011 – Churchill Downs
- 2010 – Churchill Downs
- 2009 – Santa Anita Park
- 2008 – Santa Anita Park
- 2007 – Monmouth Park
- 2006 – Churchill Downs
- 2005 – Belmont Park
- 2004 – Lone Star Park
- 2003 – Santa Anita Park
- 2002 – Arlington Park
- 2001 – Belmont Park
- 2000 – Churchill Downs
- 1999 – Gulfstream Park
- 1998 – Churchill Downs
- 1997 – Hollywood Park
- 1996 – Woodbine
- 1995 – Belmont Park
- 1994 – Churchill Downs
- 1993 – Santa Anita Park
- 1992 – Gulfstream Park
- 1991 – Churchill Downs
- 1990 – Belmont Park
- 1989 – Gulfstream Park
- 1988 – Churchill Downs
- 1987 – Hollywood Park
- 1986 – Santa Anita Park
- 1985 – Aqueduct
- 1984 – Hollywood Park

== Steeplechase ==
For several years, the "Grand National Steeplechase" (now run as the Grand National Hurdle Stakes) was known as the Breeders' Cup Grand National Steeplechase under a licensing agreement between the National Steeplechase Association and Breeders' Cup. However, the Grand National was never an official part of the Breeders' Cup series.

== See also ==
- Breeders' Cup Challenge
- Breeders Crown
- Breeders' Stakes
- List of horse races
- Thoroughbred Owners and Breeders Association
- Triple Crown of Thoroughbred Racing
