= Pounced =

American-bred Thoroughbred racehorse

- Sire: Rahy
- Grandsire: Blushing Groom
- Dam: Golden Cat
- Damsire: Storm Cat
- Sex: Colt
- Foaled: 2007
- Country: United States
- Colour: Bay
- Breeder: Carwell Equities Ltd
- Owner: Serena Rothschild
- Trainer: John Gosden
- Record: 4:2-2-0
- Earnings: US$$668,504

Major wins
- Breeders' Cup Juvenile Turf (2009)

Pounced is a Breeders' Cup Juvenile Turf-winning thoroughbred racehorse owned by Lady Rothschild. He was retired to stud in 2010.

He is a son of Rahy who stands in Kentucky and the Storm Cat mare Golden Cat.

On November 7, 2009, at Santa Anita Park, Pounced stalked the front-running Bridgetown for much of the race before blowing past the Florida-bred Summer Stakes winner in the closing.
