= Breeders' Cup Juvenile Turf =

American Thoroughbred horse race

- Class: Grade I
- Location: United States, United States
- Inaugurated: 2007
- Race type: Thoroughbred – Flat racing
- Website: Official Breeders' Cup website

Race information
- Distance: One mile (8 furlongs)
- Surface: Turf
- Track: Left-handed
- Qualification: Two-year-olds
- Weight: Assigned
- Purse: US$1,000,000

The Breeders' Cup Juvenile Turf is an American Thoroughbred horse race for two-year-old horses, run on a grass course at a distance of one mile. It is part of the Breeders' Cup World Championships, the de facto year-end championship for North American thoroughbred racing. All Breeders' Cups to date have been conducted in the United States, with the exception of the 1996 event in Canada.

The race was run for the first time in 2007 during the first day of the expanded Breeders' Cup at host track, Monmouth Park Racetrack in Oceanport, New Jersey. The race received Grade II status in 2009. The American Graded Stakes Committee further upgraded the race to Grade I status for 2011.

== Automatic berths ==
Beginning in 2007, the Breeders' Cup developed the Breeders' Cup Challenge, a series of "Win and You're In" races that allot automatic qualifying bids to winners of defined races. Each of the fourteen divisions has multiple qualifying races. Note that one horse may win multiple challenge races, while other challenge winners will not be entered in the Breeders' Cup for a variety of reasons such as injury or travel considerations.

In the Juvenile Turf division, runners are limited to 14. The 2022 "Win and You're In" races were:

1. the Juvenile Stakes, a Group 2 race run in September at Leopardstown Racecourse in Dublin, Ireland
2. the Summer Stakes, a Grade 1 race run in September at Woodbine Racetrack in Toronto, Ontario, Canada
3. the Royal Lodge Stakes, a Group 2 race run in September at Rowley Mile in Newmarket, England
4. the Prix Jean-Luc Lagardère, a Group 1 race at Longchamp Racecourse in Paris, France
5. the Pilgrim Stakes, a Grade 2 race run in October at Aqueduct Racetrack in New York
6. the Bourbon Stakes, a Grade 2 race run in October at Keeneland in Lexington, Kentucky

== Records ==
Most wins by a jockey:

- 8 – Ryan Moore (2011, 2012, 2015, 2017, 2022, 2023, 2024, 2026)

Most wins by a trainer:

- 9 – Aidan O'Brien (2011, 2012, 2015, 2017, 2022, 2023, 2024, 2025, 2026)

Most wins by an owner:

- 9 – Mrs. John Magnier, Michael Tabor, Derrick Smith (2011, 2012, 2015, 2017, 2022, 2023, 2024, 2025, 2026)

== Winners ==
Year	Winner	Jockey	Trainer	Owner	Time	Purse	Grade
2026	Haffner	Ryan Moore	Aidan O'Brien	Peter M. Brant, Mrs. John Magnier, Michael Tabor & Derrick Smith	1:35.19	$1,000,000	I
2025	Gstaad (GB)	Christophe Soumillon	Aiden O’Brien	Mrs. John Magnier, Michael Tabor & Derrick Smith	1:34.93	$1,000,000	I
2024	Henri Matisse (IRE)	Ryan Moore	Aidan O'Brien	Mrs. John Magnier, Michael Tabor, Derrick Smith & Merriebelle Irish Farm	1:34.48	$1,000,000	I
2023	Unquestionable (FR)	Ryan Moore	Aidan O'Brien	Mrs. John Magnier, Michael Tabor, Derrick Smith, Westerburg & Al Shaqab Racing	1:33.65	$1,000,000	I
2022	Victoria Road (IRE)	Ryan Moore	Aidan O'Brien	Mrs. John Magnier, Michael Tabor, Derrick Smith & Westerburg	1:35.99	$1,000,000	I
2021	Modern Games (IRE)	William Buick	Charlie Appleby	Godolphin	1:34.72	$1,000,000	I
2020	Fire At Will	Ricardo Santana Jr.	Michael J. Maker	Three Diamonds Farm (Kirk & Debra Wycoff)	1:35.81	$1,000,000	I
2019	Structor	José Ortiz	Chad C. Brown	Jeff Drown & Don Rachel	1:35.11	$1,000,000	I
2018	Line of Duty (IRE)	William Buick	Charlie Appleby	Godolphin	1:40.60	$1,000,000	I
2017	Mendelssohn	Ryan Moore	Aidan O'Brien	Mrs. John Magnier, Michael Tabor, Derrick Smith	1:35.97	$1,000,000	I
2016	Oscar Performance	José Ortiz	Brian A. Lynch	Amerman Racing Stables LLC	1:33.28	$1,000,000	I
2015	Hit It A Bomb	Ryan Moore	Aidan O'Brien	Evie Stockwell	1:38.86	$1,000,000	I
2014	Hootenanny	Frankie Dettori	Wesley A. Ward	Mrs. John Magnier, Michael Tabor, Derrick Smith	1:34.79	$1,000,000	I
2013	Outstrip (GB)	Mike Smith	Charlie Appleby	Godolphin	1:33.20	$1,000,000	I
2012	George Vancouver	Ryan Moore	Aidan O'Brien	Mrs. John Magnier, Michael Tabor, Derrick Smith	1:33.78	$1,000,000	I
2011	Wrote (IRE)	Ryan Moore	Aidan O'Brien	Mrs. John Magnier, Michael Tabor, Derrick Smith	1:37.41	$1,000,000	I
2010	Pluck	Garrett K. Gomez	Todd A. Pletcher	Team Valor International	1:36.98	$1,000,000	II
2009	Pounced	Frankie Dettori	John Gosden	Serena Rothschild	1:35.47	$1,000,000	II
2008	Donativum (GB)	Frankie Dettori	John Gosden	Jordan Princess Haya & Darley Racing	1:34.68	$1,000,000	
2007	Nownownow	Julien Leparoux	François Parisel	Fab Oak Stable (Fabien Ouak)	1:40.48	$1,000,000	

== See also ==
- Breeders' Cup Juvenile Turf "top three finishers" and starters
- Breeders' Cup World Thoroughbred Championships
- American thoroughbred racing top attended events
