= Jack Christopher =

American racehorse

- Sire: Munnings
- Grandsire: Speightstown
- Dam: Rushin No Blushin
- Damsire: Half Ours
- Sex: Stallion
- Foaled: 30 January 2019 (age 6)
- Country: United States
- Colour: Chestnut
- Breeder: Castleton Lyons & Kilboy Estate
- Owner: Jim Bakke, Gerry Isbister, Coolmore Stud & Peter Brant
- Trainer: Chad C. Brown
- Record: 6:5-0-1
- Earnings: $1,216,400

Major wins
- Champagne Stakes (2021); Pat Day Mile Stakes (2022); Woody Stephens Stakes (2022); H. Allen Jerkens Memorial Stakes (2022)
- Last updated on 28 August 2022

Jack Christopher (foaled 30 January 2019) is a multiple Grade I-winning American Thoroughbred racehorse who won the Grade I Champagne Stakes as a two-year-old and the Woody Stephens Stakes and H. Allen Jerkens Memorial Stakes in 2022.

== Background ==
Jack Christopher is a chestnut stallion that was bred in Kentucky by Castleton Lyons & Kilboy Estate. His sire is Munnings who ran second in the 2008 renewal of Champagne Stakes and stands at Ashford Stud and his dam is Rushin No Blushin who was sired by Half Ours. Rushin No Blushin is a half sister to multiple Grade I winner and sire Street Boss.

Jack Christopher was bought for $135,000 from Paramount Sales' consignment to the 2020 Fasig-Tipton Kentucky October Yearlings Sale.

== Racing career ==
=== 2021: Two-year-old season ===
Jack Christopher began his racing career on 28 August in a Maiden Special Weight event over 6 furlongs at Saratoga Race Course. Starting as the 11/10 favorite in a field of 7, he began sharply and forged three wide on the turn entering the straight, where he kicked clear, winning by 8 3/4 lengths. Trainer Chad Brown then entered the colt in the Grade I Champagne Stakes at Belmont Park. Nearly five weeks later, Jack Christopher was made the heavy favorite over Gunite and Wit. The latter had won the Grade III Sanford Stakes and was the only other stakes winner in the field. Gunite shook free in the early going to take the lead, but Jack Christopher moved quickly into a stalking position. He pulled away and never faced a serious challenge, winning by 2 3/4 lengths in a time of 1:36.72. Jack Christopher earned points for the Kentucky Derby as well as automatic entry for the Breeders' Cup Juvenile held at Del Mar.

However, Jack Christopher was scratched the day before the Breeders' Cup Juvenile on the advice of Breeders' Cup veterinarians. Due to a couple of areas lighting up on a bone scan, mainly the left shin, he had a screw inserted in that shin by orthopedic surgeon Dr. Larry Bramlage and was sidelined for two months.

=== 2022: Three-year-old season ===
Jack Christopher resumed training after his operation on 27 February in Florida, which was deemed too late for preparations for the Kentucky Derby. After gradual training of ten spaced works, connections entered Jack Christopher in the Pat Day Mile Stakes over a distance of one mile on the Kentucky Derby undercard. Jack Christopher was made the 7/10 favorite in a field of eleven three-year-olds. After pressing the pace of early leader Pappacap, he pulled away to score by 3 3/4 lengths in a time of 1:34.81. Trainer Chad Brown commented, "It's a little bittersweet that we did get him to the first Saturday in May, which we had been thinking about since he debuted up at Saratoga, that unbelievable performance. To get him to the first Saturday in May and have him roar down the stretch and get to the winner's circle but not be in the race that's a few races later, will always be in the back of my mind if he could have done it."

On 11 June, Belmont Stakes Day, Jack Christopher was entered in the Grade I Woody Stephens Stakes, a sprinting event for three-year-olds. Once again he dominated the field, winning his fourth straight event and second Grade I with a ten-length victory. Jack Christopher pressed leader Provocateur through a half-mile in :45.38 before being pushed for more in early stretch. He then drew off under a hand-ride in the last 100 yards, completing the seven furlongs in 1:21.18. Trainer Chad Brown commented after the event, "I felt really good when Jose (Ortiz Jr.) slipped to the outside of the speed horse. The only thing I was worried about was Provocateur potentially really hounding us the whole race; potentially softening us up from a tricky post. Once Jose got him out in the clear, I didn't see any possible way this horse could lose." After the win, connections indicated that Jack Christopher would attempt to run at a longer distance and challenge the premier three-year-olds.

He was then entered in the Grade I Haskell Stakes at Monmouth Park in his first attempt in an event with two turns and at a distance of 1 1/8 miles. Jack Christopher was installed as the 7/10 favorite in a field that included GI Arkansas Derby winner Cyberknife and Bob Baffert-trained Grade I Santa Anita Derby winner Taiba. Jack Christopher began well, rated off of longshot Jesus Cruz-trained Benevengo entering the clubhouse turn. He stalked close up two wide, then pressed the pace, bid two wide entering the far turn, dueled on the turn, put a head in front at the quarter pole, and was overtaken by Cyberknife and Taiba to finish third, beaten by two lengths. Winner Cyberknife set a track-record of 1:46.24 for the 1 1/8 miles distance. Chad Brown was positive after the race, saying, "I felt very, very good turning for home. I thought it was a beautiful trip, but at the end of the day, I thought he (pushed) fair fractions. It's pretty simple we have to cut him back. Hats off to the winner. He looked the part of a real threat the entire race."

On August 27, Jack Christopher returned to a sprinting event, the seven-furlong Grade I H. Allen Jerkens Memorial at Saratoga. Starting as the overwhelming favorite at 11/20, he bounced in front but then conceded the lead to Conagher. With three furlongs to run, Ortiz guided Jack Christopher guided to the front and held Gunite off for a 1 1/4 lengths victory in a time of 1:21.15. Brown said, "I'm just so proud of the horse. He's been a very consistent horse. He's never disappointed us in a workout or a race." He was noncommittal regarding what might be next for his trainee, but the Grade I Breeders' Cup Sprint and Grade I Breeders' Cup Dirt Mile appeared to be options that fall at Keeneland.

== Statistics ==
Date	Distance	Race	Grade	Track	Odds	Field	Finish	Winning Time	Winning (Losing) Margin	Jockey	Ref
2021 – Two-year-old season
Aug 28, 2021	6 furlongs	Maiden Special Weight		Saratoga	1.10*	7	1	1:09.85	8 3/4 lengths	Jose L. Ortiz	
Oct 2, 2021	1 mile	Champagne Stakes	I	Belmont Park	1.70*	6	1	1:36.72	2 3/4 lengths	Jose L. Ortiz	
2022 – Three-year-old season
May 7, 2022	1 mile	Pat Day Mile Stakes	II	Churchill Downs	0.70*	11	1	1:34.81	3 3/4 lengths	Jose L. Ortiz	
Jun 11, 2022	7 furlongs	Woody Stephens Stakes	I	Belmont Park	0.35*	6	1	1:21.18	10 lengths	Jose L. Ortiz	
Jul 23, 2022	1 1/8 miles	Haskell Stakes	I	Monmouth Park	0.70*	8	3	1:46.24	(2 lengths)	Jose L. Ortiz	
Aug 27, 2022	7 furlongs	H. Allen Jerkens Memorial Stakes	I	Saratoga	0.55*	8	1	1:21.35	1 1/4 lengths	Joel Rosario	

Notes:
An (*) asterisk after the odds means Jack Christopher was the post-time favourite.

== Pedigree ==
Pedigree of Jack Christopher, chestnut colt, 30 January 2019
Sire Munnings 2006	Speightstown; 1998	Gone West; 1984	Mr. Prospector 1970
Sire Munnings 2006	Speightstown; 1998	Gone West; 1984	Secrettame 1978
Sire Munnings 2006	Speightstown; 1998	Silken Cat (CAN); 1993	Storm Cat 1983
Sire Munnings 2006	Speightstown; 1998	Silken Cat (CAN); 1993	Silken Doll 1980
Sire Munnings 2006	La Comete; 1996	Holy Bull; 1991	Great Above 1972
Sire Munnings 2006	La Comete; 1996	Holy Bull; 1991	Sharon Brown 1980
Sire Munnings 2006	La Comete; 1996	La Guiriere; 1988	Lord At War (ARG) 1980
Sire Munnings 2006	La Comete; 1996	La Guiriere; 1988	Lady Winborne 1976
Dam Rushin No Blushin 2009	Half Ours; 2003	Unbridled's Song; 1993	Unbridled 1997
Dam Rushin No Blushin 2009	Half Ours; 2003	Unbridled's Song; 1993	Trolley Song 1983
Dam Rushin No Blushin 2009	Half Ours; 2003	Zing; 1997	Storm Cat 1983
Dam Rushin No Blushin 2009	Half Ours; 2003	Zing; 1997	Key Phrase 1991
Dam Rushin No Blushin 2009	Blushing Ogygian; 1994	Ogygian; 1983	Damascus 1964
Dam Rushin No Blushin 2009	Blushing Ogygian; 1994	Ogygian; 1983	Gonfalon 1975
Dam Rushin No Blushin 2009	Blushing Ogygian; 1994	Fruhlingshochzeit; 1984	Blushing Groom (FR) 1975
Dam Rushin No Blushin 2009	Blushing Ogygian; 1994	Fruhlingshochzeit; 1984	Fruhlingstag (FR) 1975 (family 1-e)

Jack Christopher is inbred 4s × 4d to Storm Cat.
