= Jackie's Warrior =

American racehorse

- Sire: Maclean's Music
- Grandsire: Distorted Humor
- Dam: Unicorn Girl
- Damsire: A. P. Five Hundred
- Sex: Stallion
- Foaled: 13 February 2018 (age 7)
- Country: United States
- Colour: Bay
- Breeder: J & J Stables
- Owner: J. Kirk & Judy Robison
- Trainer: Steven M. Asmussen
- Record: 18: 12-2-2
- Earnings: $2,959,164

Major wins
- Saratoga Special Stakes (2020); Hopeful Stakes (2020); Champagne Stakes (2020); Pat Day Mile Stakes (2021); Amsterdam Stakes (2021); H. Allen Jerkens Memorial Stakes (2021); Gallant Bob Stakes (2021); Count Fleet Sprint Handicap (2022); Churchill Downs Stakes (2022); True North Stakes (2022); Alfred G. Vanderbilt Handicap (2022)

Awards
- American Champion Sprint Horse (2021)
- Last updated on 10 December 2022

Jackie's Warrior (foaled February 13, 2018) is a Champion American Thoroughbred racehorse who has won five Grade I events including the Hopeful Stakes at Saratoga, the Champagne Stakes at Belmont Park in 2020 and the H. Allen Jerkens Memorial Stakes at Saratoga (2021). Jackie's Warrior was awarded as Eclipse Award as American Champion Sprint Horse in 2021. In 2022 won the Grade I Churchill Downs Stakes and Alfred G. Vanderbilt Handicap at Saratoga.

== Background ==
Jackie's Warrior is a bay stallion that was bred in Kentucky by J & J Stables. His sire is Maclean's Music and his dam is Unicorn Girl, who won 19 races out of 54 starts and earned a grand total of $483,508. Jackie's Warrior was her third foal and first stakes winner. He was bought for $95,000 by J. Kirk Robison out of Taylor Made Sales Agency's consignment at the 2019 Keeneland September Yearling Sale. Jackie's Warrior was named by his breeders, Jennie and John Williams of J and J Stables in Florida, to honor Jennie's sister, Jackie Ross, a brain cancer survivor in remission. Jackie's Warrior was trained by Steven M. Asmussen and his regular jockey was Joel Rosario.

== Racing career ==
=== 2020: Two-year-old season ===
Jackie's Warrior began his career on 19 June at Churchill Downs in a maiden event for two-year-olds over a distance of five furlongs facing six other non-winners, of which only one had raced before. The more experienced Petit Verdot bounced out in front and from the 2 post Jackie's Warrior tracked the leader, then switch to the outside on the turn and in the straight a furlong from home cleared away to win by 2 1/2 lengths in a time of 57.49 seconds.

Trainer Steve Asmussen then pointed Jackie's Warrior towards the two-year-old stakes races at Saratoga. In his next start on 7 August, Jackie's Warrior led throughout, winning the Grade II Saratoga Special Stakes by three lengths. Jockey Joel Rosario commented after the race, "When they came to him, he wanted to go, and I felt even more confident at that point. I knew he had something left." After his second race J. Kirk Robison added his wife as part owner of Jackie's Warrior.

Four weeks later, Jackie's Warrior faced seven rivals in the Grade I Hopeful Stakes. Again he went to the lead and opened up a five-length lead over even-money favorite Reinvestment Risk in the straight before finishing over 2 lengths in front at the wire. Jackie's Warrior as the 9/5 second choice finished in a time of 1:21.29, which was a stakes record.

Jackie's Warrior's next start was on 10 October in the Champagne Stakes at Belmont Park, where he faced five other entrants. Starting as the 17/20 odds-on favorite, he led Reinvestment Risk throughout and extended his lead in the straight to win his fourth straight race by 5 1/2 lengths in a time of 1:35.42. Regular jockey Rosario said, “I was very confident that he could get the mile. He just enjoyed what he was doing." Jackie's Warrior earned 10 points in qualification in the Road to the Kentucky Derby and emerged as the favorite for the Breeders' Cup Juvenile.

The Breeders' Cup Juvenile, held at Keeneland attracted a full field of 14, and Jackie's Warrior started as the 9/10 odds-on favorite.

From barrier 2, jockey Joel Rosario was not able to get to the lead from the start but had to settle and trail longshot Dreamer's Disease. Jackie's Warrior forged a path to the outside of Dreamer's Disease leaving the backstretch and hit the front to lead a by half-length. However, second favorite from midfield Essential Quality also moved four-wide towards the lead outside of Jackie's Warrior, passing the other leaders and winning. Jackie's Warrior finished fourth, beaten 3 1/4 lengths.

Jackie's Warrior finished a distant second to Essential Quality in the Eclipse Award for US Champion Two-Year-Olds.

=== 2021: Three-year-old season ===
After a break of over three months, Jackie's Warrior resumed his career with the plan to qualify for the Kentucky Derby as an entrant in the Grade III Southwest Stakes at Oaklawn Park over 1 1/16 miles. Leading early, he tired in the straight, finishing a distant third to Essential Quality and Spielberg. Soon after, connections informed that Jackie's Warrior would be off the Kentucky Derby trail.

On Kentucky Derby Day, he started as the 23/10 favorite in an undercard event, the Grade II Pat Day Mile Stakes for three-year-olds over a mile. After leading, Jackie's Warrior held on strongly to hold off Dream Shake to win by a neck. Jockey Rosario commented after the race, "He likes when a horse comes up to him, and he really digs in. I was not worried about the fast early pace because he fights very hard down the stretch."

Jackie's Warrior's third start of the year was at Belmont Park in the Grade I Woody Stephens Stakes over seven furlongs where he faced five other three-year-olds. Again starting well and leading with fast fractions of 22.09 and 44.19, he seemed to have the race in hand but was beaten by Drain The Clock by a neck. According to his jockey, he stumbled out of the starting gate, which may have cost him the race.

After a two-month break, Jackie's Warrior returned to Saratoga, where he had success the previous season. Starting as the 1/2 odds-on favorite in the Grade II Amsterdam Stakes he defeated Drain the Clock by 7 1/4 lengths on a sloppy track.

Four weeks later in the Grade I H. Allen Jerkens Memorial Stakes, Jackie's Warrior met Life Is Good. Jackie's Warrior came from off the lead to win by a neck in a fast time of 1:21.39. Life Is Good was making his first start after a 171-day layoff that included an operation.

On 25 September, Jackie's Warrior started in the Grade II Gallant Bob Stakes at Parx Racing in Bensalem. He was the 1/20 favorite and won by nearly seven length in a time of 1:08.64 for the six-furlong distance.

Jackie's Warrior's last start of the year was in the Breeders' Cup Sprint at Del Mar on 6 November. Installed as the 1/2 favorite, he was quick out of the gate and clocked fractions of 21.91 and 44.11 while being pressed by Special Reserve and Matera Sky. In the straight, Jackie's Warrior tired to finish sixth in the field of nine.

The NTRA awarded him an Eclipse Award as American Champion Sprint Horse for 2021.

=== 2022: Four-year-old season ===
Jackie's Warrior began his four-year-old campaign on 16 April in the Grade III Count Fleet Sprint Handicap at Oaklawn Park. On a sloppy sealed track Jackie's Warrior defeated five other foes in a time of 1:09.09.

On 7 May Jackie's Warrior ran in the Grade I Churchill Downs Stakes on Kentucky Derby Day. Starting brilliantly as the even-money favorite he led all the way in the seven horse field extending in the straight to a comfortable four-length victory in a time of 1:21.95.

On 10 June Jackie's Warrior faced five other entrants in the Grade II True North Stakes at Belmont Park. Starting as the overwhelming 1/4 odds on favorite Jackie's Warrior was bumped in the hindquarters at the start but was able to move forward and get to the lead and easily dispatched his foes winning by five lengths in a time of 1:15.09 with jockey Joel Rosario never asking him for his best and easing him up in the final 70 yards of the race.

In the Alfred G. Vanderbilt Handicap at Saratoga on July 30, Jackie's Warrior was assigned 127 pounds. Facing five other entrants Jackie's Warrior started as the overwhelming 1/4 odds-on favorite by the crowd of 37,476, made his opponents feeble as jockey Joel Rosario never moved a muscle cruised to the easiest of two-length wins in a time of 1:09.74. The margin could have been more had Rosario asked him for more.

Jackie's Warrior attempted his sixth career win at Saratoga in the Grade I Forego Stakes on August 27. Starting as the 3/20 odds-on favorite was upset by the 8/1 second favorite Cody's Wish by 1 1/4 lengths in a time of 1:20.95. Trainer Steven Asmussen said, "There's a little sadness that it's his last time to run at Saratoga because he's brought us so much fun and joy here. He'll be sharp for the (Grade I Breeders' Cup Sprint), which will be his next and last race."

On November 5, Jackie's Warrior ran his final career race in the Breeders' Cup Sprint at Keeneland. Starting as the 0.77 favorite Jackie's Warrior finished third to Elite Power.

== Statistics ==
| Date | Distance | Race | Grade | Track | Odds | Field | Finish | Winning Time | Winning (Losing) Margin | Jockey | Ref |
|---|---|---|---|---|---|---|---|---|---|---|---|
2020 – Two-year-old season
| Jun 19, 2020 | 5 furlongs | Maiden Special Weight | | Churchill Downs | 2.10 | 7 | 1 | 0:57.49 | 2 1/2 lengths | Ricardo Santana Jr. | |
| Aug 7, 2020 | 6 furlongs | Saratoga Special Stakes | II | Saratoga | 3.10 | 9 | 1 | 1:09.62 | 3 lengths | Joel Rosario | |
| Sep 7, 2020 | 7 furlongs | Hopeful Stakes | I | Saratoga | 1.85 | 7 | 1 | 1:21.29 | 2 1/4 lengths | Joel Rosario | |
| Oct 10, 2020 | 1 mile | Champagne Stakes | I | Belmont Park | 0.85* | 6 | 1 | 1:35.42 | 5 1/2 lengths | Joel Rosario | |
| Nov 6, 2020 | 1 1/16 miles | Breeders' Cup Juvenile | I | Keeneland | 0.90* | 14 | 4 | 1:42.09 | (3 1/4 lengths) | Joel Rosario | |
2021 – Three-year-old season
| Feb 27, 2021 | 1 1/16 miles | Southwest Stakes | III | Oaklawn Park | 1.20 | 7 | 3 | 1:45.48 | (8 1/2 lengths) | Joel Rosario | |
| May 1, 2021 | 1 mile | Pat Day Mile Stakes | II | Churchill Downs | 2.30* | 11 | 1 | 1:34.39 | head | Joel Rosario | |
| Jun 5, 2021 | 7 furlongs | Woody Stephens Stakes | I | Belmont Park | 1.05* | 6 | 2 | 1:22.27 | (neck) | Joel Rosario | |
| Aug 1, 2021 | 6 1/2 furlongs | Amsterdam Stakes | II | Saratoga | 0.50* | 6 | 1 | 1:15.46 | 7 1/4 lengths | Joel Rosario | |
| Aug 28, 2021 | 7 furlongs | H. Allen Jerkens Memorial Stakes | I | Saratoga | 1.55 | 6 | 1 | 1:21.39 | neck | Joel Rosario | |
| Sep 25, 2021 | 6 furlongs | Gallant Bob Stakes | II | Parx Racing | 0.05* | 5 | 1 | 1:08.64 | 6 3/4 lengths | Joel Rosario | |
| Nov 6, 2021 | 6 furlongs | Breeders' Cup Sprint | I | Del Mar | 0.50* | 9 | 6 | 1:08.49 | (4 1/2 lengths) | Joel Rosario | |
2022 – Four-year-old season
| Apr 16, 2022 | 6 furlongs | Count Fleet Sprint Handicap | III | Oaklawn Park | 0.50* | 6 | 1 | 1:09.09 | 3/4 length | Joel Rosario | |
| May 7, 2022 | 7 furlongs | Churchill Downs Stakes | I | Churchill Downs | 1.00* | 7 | 1 | 1:21.95 | 4 lengths | Joel Rosario | |
| Jun 10, 2022 | 6 1/2 furlongs | True North Stakes | II | Belmont Park | 0.25* | 6 | 1 | 1:15.09 | 5 lengths | Joel Rosario | |
| Jul 30, 2022 | 6 furlongs | Alfred G. Vanderbilt Handicap | I | Saratoga | 0.25* | 6 | 1 | 1:09.74 | 2 lengths | Joel Rosario | |
| Aug 27, 2022 | 7 furlongs | Forego Stakes | I | Saratoga | 0.15* | 7 | 2 | 1:20.95 | (1 1/4 lengths) | Joel Rosario | |
| Nov 5, 2022 | 6 furlongs | Breeders' Cup Sprint | I | Keeneland | 0.77* | 11 | 3 | 1:09.11 | (1 3/4 lengths) | Joel Rosario | |

Notes:
An (*) asterisk after the odds means Jackie's Warrior was the post-time favourite.

== Stud career ==
On retirement will begin his stud career at Spendthrift Farm in 2023. It was announced that Jackie's Warrior would stand his first season for a fee of $50,000.

== Pedigree ==
Pedigree of Jackie's Warrior, bay colt, 13 February 2018
| Sire Maclean's Music 2008 | Distorted Humor; 1993 | Forty Niner; 1985 | Mr Prospector 1970 |
| Sire Maclean's Music 2008 | Distorted Humor; 1993 | Forty Niner; 1985 | File 1976 |
| Sire Maclean's Music 2008 | Distorted Humor; 1993 | Danzig's Beauty; 1987 | Danzig* 1977 |
| Sire Maclean's Music 2008 | Distorted Humor; 1993 | Danzig's Beauty; 1987 | Sweetest Chant 1978 |
| Sire Maclean's Music 2008 | Forest Music; 2001 | Unbridled's Song; 1993 | Unbridled 1987 |
| Sire Maclean's Music 2008 | Forest Music; 2001 | Unbridled's Song; 1993 | Trolley Song 1983 |
| Sire Maclean's Music 2008 | Forest Music; 2001 | Defer West; 1991 | Gone West 1984 |
| Sire Maclean's Music 2008 | Forest Music; 2001 | Defer West; 1991 | Defer 1983 |
| Dam Unicorn Girl 2005 | A.P. Five Hundred; 1999 | A.P. Indy; 1989 | Seattle Slew 1974 |
| Dam Unicorn Girl 2005 | A.P. Five Hundred; 1999 | A.P. Indy; 1989 | Weekend Surprise 1980 |
| Dam Unicorn Girl 2005 | A.P. Five Hundred; 1999 | Banner Dancer; 1989 | Danzig* 1977 |
| Dam Unicorn Girl 2005 | A.P. Five Hundred; 1999 | Banner Dancer; 1989 | Nalees Flying Flag 1975 |
| Dam Unicorn Girl 2005 | Horah for Bailey; 2001 | Doneraile Court; 1996 | Seattle Slew 1974 |
| Dam Unicorn Girl 2005 | Horah for Bailey; 2001 | Doneraile Court; 1996 | Sophisticated Girl 1980 |
| Dam Unicorn Girl 2005 | Horah for Bailey; 2001 | Horah for the Lady; 1993 | Rahy 1985 |
| Dam Unicorn Girl 2005 | Horah for Bailey; 2001 | Horah for the Lady; 1993 | Istria (GB) 1977 (family 4-n) |

* Jackie's Warrior is inbred 4S x 4D to the stallion Danzig, meaning that he appears fourth generation on the sire side of his pedigree and fourth on the dam side of his pedigree.
