= 2022 Road to the Kentucky Derby =

The 2022 Road to the Kentucky Derby is a series of races through which horses qualified for the 2022 Kentucky Derby, which was held on May 7.

== Background ==
The field for the Derby is limited to 20 horses, with up to four 'also eligibles' in case of a late withdrawal from the field. There are three separate paths for horses to take to qualify for the Derby: the main Road consisting of races in North America (plus one in Dubai), the Japan Road consisting of four races in Japan, and the European road consisting of seven races in England, Ireland and France. The top four finishers in the specified races receive points, with higher points awarded in the major prep races in March and April. Earnings in non-restricted stakes races act as a tie breaker.

For 2022, the main Road to the Kentucky Derby resembled the 2021 Road to the Kentucky Derby, consisting of 37 races, one more event than in 2021, with 21 races for the Kentucky Derby Prep Season and 16 races for the Kentucky Derby Championship Season with the following changes: (Note: See the following list for details)

- The inaugural Gun Runner Stakes at the Fair Grounds was added as part of the Prep season
- Qualification points were not awarded to any horse trained by any individual who was suspended from racing in the 2022 Kentucky Derby or any trainer directly or indirectly employed, supervised, or advised by a suspended trainer. This rule was introduced in response to Churchill Down's suspension of trainer Bob Baffert following a positive drug test by one of his horses in the 2021 Kentucky Derby.

== Standings ==
The following table shows the points earned in the eligible races for the main series. As none of the offers on the Japan Road or European Road were accepted, all twenty positions in the Derby starting gate will qualify via the main series. The rankings are from the April 25 update of the Kentucky Derby leaderboard, updated for the May 1 announcement that Early Voting would bypass the race.

Rank	Horse	Points	Earnings (Note: Earnings from non-restricted stakes prior to the running of the Kentucky Derby serve as a tie-breaker.)	Trainer	Owner	Ref
1	Epicenter	164	$940,000	Steven Asmussen	Winchell Thoroughbreds	
2	Zandon	114	$663,500	Chad C. Brown	Jeff Drown	
3	White Abarrio	112	$769,650	Saffie Joseph Jr.	Racing Stable & La Milagrosa Stable	
4	Mo Donegal	112	$561,500	Todd A. Pletcher	Donegal Racing	
5	Tiz the Bomb	110	$1,012,210	Kenneth G. McPeek	Magdelena Racing	
6	Cyberknife	100	$752,000	Brad H. Cox	Gold Square	
7	Crown Pride (JPN)	100	$671,544	Koichi Shintani	Teruya Yoshida	
8	Taiba	100	$450,000	Tim Yakteen	Zedan Racing	
9	Simplification	74	$482,150	Antonio Sano	Tami Bobo	
10	Smile Happy	70	$499,410	Kenneth G. McPeek	Lucky Seven Stable	
11 (Note: Classic Causeway's connections were originally thinking of bypassing the Derby but decided on April 25 to enter after training well.)	Classic Causeway	66	$466,100	Brian A. Lynch	Kentucky West Racing & Clarke M. Cooper	
ill	Slow Down Andy	60	$475,000	Doug F. O'Neill	Reddam Racing	
12	Tawny Port	60	$351,400	Brad H. Cox	Peachtree Stable	
13	Barber Road	58	$589,700	John Ortiz	WSS Racing	
injured	Un Ojo	54	$661,250	Ricky Courville (Note: Un Ojo was temporarily trained by Anthony Dutrow when he was shipped to New York for the Withers Stakes)	Cypress Creek Equine	
withdrawn (Note: Forbidden Kingdom was withdrawn from consideration after finishing last in the Santa Anita Derby. He is being evaluated for a trapped epiglottis, a condition that constricts a horse's breathing.)	Forbidden Kingdom	50	$392,000	Richard E. Mandella	MyRacehorse & Spendthrift Farm	
bypass	Early Voting	50	$277,500	Chad C. Brown	Klaravich Stables	
injured	Morello	50	$242,500	Steven Asmussen	Blue Lion Thoroughbreds, Craig Taylor & Diamond T Racing	
14	Messier	40 (Note: Before the Santa Anita Derby, Messier was trained by Bob Baffert and thus did not earn any points for his earlier starts.)	$390,000	Tim Yakteen	SF Racing, Starlight Racing, Madaket Stables et al.	
15	Zozos	40	$200,000	Brad H. Cox	Barry & Joni Butzow	
16	Summer Is Tomorrow (Note: Summer Is Tomorrow was a late nominee. He is ranked behind Zozos based on career earnings, the third tie-breaker.)	40	$200,000	Bhupat Seemar	Michael Hilary & Negar Burke	
17	Charge It	40	$188,000	Todd A. Pletcher	Whisper Hill Farm	
18	Happy Jack	30	$142,000	Doug F. O'Neill	Calumet Farm	
19	Pioneer of Medina	25	$116,000	Todd A. Pletcher	Sumaya U.S. Stable	
bypass	Emmanuel	25	$111,700	Todd A. Pletcher	WinStar Farm & Siena Farm	
bypass	Pappacap	24	$609,000	Mark E. Casse	Rustlewood Farm	
bypass	In Due Time	24	$113,800	Kelly Breen	Edge Racing, Medallion Racing & Parkland Thoroughbreds	
20	Ethereal Road	22	$231,000	D. Wayne Lukas	Aaron Sones	
bypass	Grantham	21	$85,000	Michael J. Maker	Three Diamonds Farm	
21	Rich Strike	21	$74,500	Eric Reed	RED TR-Racing	
bypass	ƒ Secret Oath	20	$436,707	D. Wayne Lukas	Briland Farm	
22	Rattle N Roll	20	$344,000	Kenneth G. McPeek	Lucky Seven Stable	
23	Bye Bye Bobby	20	$176,700	Todd Fincher	B4 Farms	
bypass	Island Falcon (IRE)	20	$100,000	Saeed bin Suroor	Godolphin	
24	Skippylongstocking	20	$86,350	Saffie Joseph Jr.	Daniel Alonso	
bypass	Dean's List	20	$72,000	Todd A. Pletcher	WinStar Farm & Siena Farm	
25	Major General	18	$251,525	Todd A. Pletcher	WinStar Farm & Siena Farm	
26	Golden Glider	15	$87,250	Mark E. Casse	Gary Barber, Penny & Manfred Conrad	
inactive	Shipsational	14	$75,000	Edward Barker	Iris Smith Stable	
inactive	Jack Christopher	10	$275,000	Chad C. Brown	Jim Bakke, Gerald Isbister, Coolmore Stud & Peter M. Brant	
inactive (Note: Make It Big has not had any workouts and seems to be off the Kentucky Derby trail)	Make It Big	10	$240,000	Saffie Joseph Jr.	Red Oak Stable	
bypass	Dash Attack	10	$180,834	Kenneth G. McPeek	Catalyst Stable, Magdalena Racing, Kevin J. Pollard & Patty Slevin	
bypass	Doppelganger	10	$154,500	Tim Yakteen	SF Racing, Starlight Racing, Madaket Stables, et al.	
not nominated	Pepper Spray	10	$144,956	Edward J. Kereluk	Roys Mansur	
bypass	Call Me Midnight	10	$138,500	J. Keith Desormeaux	Peter L. Cantrell	
bypass	Courvoisier	10	$93,750	Kelly Breen	Hill 'n' Dale & James Spry	
bypass	Dowagiac Chief	10	$93,150	Thomas M. Amoss	Michael McLoughlin	
bypass	O Captain	10	$76,500	Gustavo Delgado	OGMA Investments & Towell & Jack Hardin Jr.	
not nominated	Bendoog	10	$74,500	Bhupat Seemar	Mohammed Khaleel Ahmed	
bypass	Golden Code	10	$36,000	Todd A. Pletcher	Calumet Farm	
bypass	Kavod	7	$286,500	Chris Hartman	James Rogers & Michael Robinson	
bypass	Commandperformance	6	$200,000	Todd A. Pletcher	Repole Stable & St. Elias Stable	
inactive (Note: Mackinnon has not had any workouts and seems to be off the Kentucky Derby trail)	Mackinnon	5	$296,000	Doug F. O'Neill	ERJ Racing, Madaket Stables & Dave Kenney	
bypass	Life Is Great	5	$48,000	Robert Klesaris	E.V. Racing Stable	
bypass	Fowler Blue	5	$29,250	Luis Mendez	William A. Branch & Arnold R. Hill	
not nominated	Beautiful Art	5	$24,000	Simon Callaghan	Kaleem Shah	
not nominated	Double Thunder	4	$320,350	Todd A. Pletcher	Phoenix Thoroughbred	
bypassing	Giant Game	4	$180,000	Dale L. Romans	West Point Thoroughbreds & Albaugh Family Stables	
not nominated	Tejano Twist	4	$177,070	W. Bret Calhoun	Tom R. Durant	
bypassing	Cabo Spirit	4	$125,300	George Papaprodromou	Kretz Racing	
bypassing	Stolen Base	4	$101,400	Michael J. Maker	Three Diamonds Farm & Duece Greathouse	
not nominated	Oviatt Class	4	$98,000	J. Keith Desormeaux	James E. Downe	
not nominated	Osbourne	4	$82,143	Ron Moquett	Southern Springs Stables, The Estate of Floyd Sagely, Mark Tauber & Keith Johnston	
bypassing	Tough to Tame	4	$57,750	Christopher Davis	Rittdiculous Gazmanian Stables	
bypassing	Smarten Up	4	$31,250	Alfredo Velazquez	Happy Tenth Stable	
bypassing	Ben Diesel	3	$104,233	Dallas Stewart	Willis Horton Racing	
inactive (Note: Wit has not had any workouts and seems to be off the Kentucky Derby trail)	Wit	2	$312,500	Todd A. Pletcher	Repole Stable, St. Elias Stable & Gainesway Stable	
inactive (Note: Cooke Creek has not had any workouts and seems to be off the Kentucky Derby trail)	Cooke Creek	2	$79,250	Jeremiah O'Dwyer	Cheyenne Stable	
bypassing	Red Knobs	2	$53,075	Dale L. Romans	Jim Bakke & Gerald Isbister	
bypassing	Midnight Chrome	2	$32,500	Tyler Servis	Alexandria Stable	
bypassing	Gilded Age	2	$30,000	William I. Mott	Grandview Equine & Don Alberto Stable	
bypassing	Ignitis	2	$29,643	D. Wayne Lukas	Holy Cow Stable	
bypassing	Volcanic	2	$34,000	Mark E. Casse	Breeze Easy	
not nominated	Grael	2	$13,465	Brendan Walsh	Godolphin	
not nominated	Surfer Dude	2	$12,000	Dallas Stewart	Mark H. & Nancy W. Stanley	
not nominated	Del Mo	2	$12,000	Doug F. O'Neill	Glenn Sorgenstein, WC Racing, Train Wreck Al Racing Stables & William Strauss	
bypassing	My Prankster	1	$121,380	Todd A. Pletcher	Lawana L. & Robert E. Low	
bypassing	American Sanctuary	1	$104,600	Christopher Davis	Dare To Dream Stable	
bypassing	Strike Hard	1	$42,500	Matthew Williams	Miracle's International Trading	
not nominated	Kevin's Folly	1	$41,250	Thomas M. Amoss	Michael McLoughlin	
bypassing	Galt	1	$32,000	William I. Mott	OXO Equine	
not nominated	Durante	1	$24,000	Doug F. O'Neill	Roadrunner Racing & William Strauss	
not nominated	Mr Jefferson	1	$17,750	Michael J. Trombetta	R. Larry Johnson	
bypassing	Bourbon Heist	1	$14,438	Ian R. Wilkes	Bourbon Lane Stable	
bypassing	Trafalgar (Note: Trafalgar is ahead of Sir London and Galt in the standings due to higher stakes earned from non-restricted stakes)	1	$12,000	Albert Stall Jr.	Columbine Stable	
inactive (Note: Sir London has not had any workouts and seems to be off the Kentucky Derby trail)	Sir London	1	$12,000	Simon Callaghan	AMO Racing USA & Qatar Racing Limited	
bypassing	Unbridled Bomber	1	$10,250	Jim Ryerson	Edward C. Potash, Brad Yankanich & James T. Ryerson	
bypassing	Il Bellator	1	$6,000	Jose Bautista	Edward A. & Theresa DeNike	

Legend:
Nominated
May bypass the Derby
Injured/Bypassing/Inactive/Not nominated
ƒ – Filly

== Prep season ==
Note: 1st=10 points; 2nd=4 points; 3rd=2 points; 4th=1 point (except the Breeders' Cup Juvenile: 1st=20 points; 2nd=8 points; 3rd=4 points; 4th=2 points)

Race	Distance	Purse	Track	Date	1st	2nd	3rd	4th	Ref
Iroquois	1 1/16 miles	$300,000	Churchill Downs	Sep 18 2021	Major General	Tough to Tame	Red Knobs	Bourbon Heist	
American Pharoah	1 1/16 miles	$301,000	Santa Anita	Oct 1 2021	Corniche (Note: Horse trained by an individual suspended from the 2022 Kentucky Derby does not receive any qualification points. Corniche and Rockefeller are trained by Bob Baffert who is suspended by Churchill Downs Inc. through 2023.)	Pappacap	Oviatt Class	Rockefeller	
Champagne	1 mile	$500,000	Belmont	Oct 2 2021	Jack Christopher	Commandperformance	Wit	My Prankster	
Breeders' Futurity	1 1/16 miles	$500,000	Keeneland	Oct 9 2021	Rattle N Roll	Double Thunder	Classic Causeway	American Sanctuary	
Breeders' Cup Juvenile	1 1/16 miles	$2,000,000	Del Mar	Nov 5 2021	Corniche (Note: Horse trained by an individual suspended from the 2022 Kentucky Derby does not receive any qualification points. Corniche is trained by Bob Baffert who is suspended by Churchill Downs Inc. through 2023.)	Pappacap	Giant Game	Commandperformance	
Kentucky Jockey Club	1 1/16 miles	$400,000	Churchill Downs	Nov 27 2021	Smile Happy	Classic Causeway	White Abarrio	Ben Diesel	
Remsen	1 1/8 miles	$250,000	Aqueduct	Dec 4 2021	Mo Donegal	Zandon	Midnight Chrome	Mr Jefferson	
Los Alamitos Futurity	1 1/16 miles	$300,000	Los Alamitos	Dec 11 2021	Slow Down Andy	Messier (Note: Horse trained by an individual suspended from the 2022 Kentucky Derby does not receive any qualification points. Messier and Barossa are trained by Bob Baffert who is suspended by Churchill Downs Inc. through 2023. Messier was transferred before the Santa Anita Derby to Tim Yaskteen.)	Barossa	Durante	
Springboard Mile	1 mile	$401,200	Remington	Dec 17 2021	Make It Big	Osbourne	Concept (Note: Horses that ran with medication (Lasix) do not receive any points towards qualification. Concept and Classic Moment received no points from the Springboard Mile.)	Classic Moment	
Gun Runner Stakes	1 1/16 miles	$98,000	Fair Grounds	Dec 26 2021	Epicenter	Tejano Twist	Surfer Dude	Kevin's Folly	
Jerome	1 mile	$150,000	Aqueduct	Jan 1 2022	Courvoisier	Smarten Up	Cooke Creek	Unbridled Bomber	
Smarty Jones	1 mile	$250,000	Oaklawn	Jan 1 2022	Dash Attack	Barber Road	Ignitis	Kavod	
Sham	1 mile	$100,000	Santa Anita	Jan 1 2022	Newgrange (Note: Horse trained by an individual suspended from the 2022 Kentucky Derby does not receive any qualification points. Newgrange and Rockefeller are trained by Bob Baffert who is suspended by Churchill Downs Inc. through 2023.)	Rockefeller	Oviatt Class	Mackinnon	
Lecomte	1 1/16 miles	$200,000	Fair Grounds	Jan 22 2022	Call Me Midnight	Epicenter	Pappacap	Trafalgar	
Southwest	1 1/16 miles	$750,000	Oaklawn	Jan 29 2022	Newgrange (Note: Horse trained by an individual suspended from the 2022 Kentucky Derby does not receive any qualification points. Newgrange is trained by Bob Baffert who is suspended by Churchill Downs Inc. through 2023.)	Barber Road	Ben Diesel	Kavod	
Withers	1 1/8 miles	$250,000	Aqueduct	Feb 5 2022	Early Voting	Un Ojo	Gilded Age	Grantham	
Holy Bull	1 1/16 miles	$250,000	Gulfstream	Feb 5 2022	White Abarrio	Simplification	Mo Donegal	Galt	
Robert B. Lewis	1 1/16 miles	$200,000	Santa Anita	Feb 6 2022	Messier (Note: Horse trained by an individual suspended from the 2022 Kentucky Derby does not receive any qualification points. Messier and Wharton are trained by Bob Baffert who is suspended by Churchill Downs Inc. through 2023. After this win, Messier and fellow Baffert-trained horse Taiba were transferred to Tim Yakteen in order to earn points.)	Cabo Spirit	Wharton	Sir London	
Sam F. Davis Stakes	1 1/16 miles	$200,000	Tampa Bay	Feb 12 2022	Classic Causeway	Shipsational	Volcanic	Strike Hard	
El Camino Real Derby	1 1/8 miles	$102,700	Golden Gate	Feb 12 2022	Blackadder (Note: Horse trained by an individual suspended from the 2022 Kentucky Derby does not receive any qualification points. Blackadder is trained by Bob Baffert who is suspended by Churchill Downs Inc. through 2023.)	Mackinnon	Del Mo	Il Bellator	
John Battaglia Memorial Stakes	1 1/16 miles	$125,000	Turfway Park	Mar 5 2022	Tiz the Bomb	Stolen Base	Grael	Rich Strike	

== Championship series events ==
=== First leg of series ===
Note: 1st=50 points; 2nd=20 points; 3rd=10 points; 4th=5 points

Race	Distance	Purse	Grade	Track	Date	1st	2nd	3rd	4th	Ref
Risen Star	1 1/8 miles	$400,000	2	Fair Grounds	Feb 19 2022	Epicenter	Smile Happy	Zandon	Pioneer of Medina	
Rebel	1 1/16 miles	$1,000,000	2	Oaklawn	Feb 26 2022	Un Ojo	Ethereal Road	Barber Road	Kavod	
Gotham	1 mile	$300,000	3	Aqueduct	Mar 5 2022	Morello	Dean's List	Golden Code	Life Is Great	
San Felipe	1 1/16 miles	$401,000	2	Santa Anita	Mar 5 2022	Forbidden Kingdom	Doppelganger	Happy Jack	Beautiful Art	
Fountain of Youth	1 1/16 miles	$400,000	2	Gulfstream	Mar 5 2022	Simplification	In Due Time	O Captain	Emmanuel	
Tampa Bay Derby	1 1/16 miles	$350,000	2	Tampa Bay	Mar 12 2022	Classic Causeway	Grantham	Shipsational	Golden Glider	
Sunland Derby	1 1/8 miles	$500,000	3	Sunland Park	Mar 27 2022	Slow Down Andy	Bye Bye Bobby	Pepper Spray	Fowler Blue	

=== Second leg of series ===
Theses races are the major preps for the Kentucky Derby, and are thus weighted more heavily. Note: 1st=100 points; 2nd=40 points; 3rd=20 points; 4th=10 points

Race	Distance	Purse	Grade	Track	Date	1st	2nd	3rd	4th	Ref
Louisiana Derby	1 3/16 miles	$1,000,000	2	Fair Grounds	Mar 26 2022	Epicenter	Zozos	Pioneer Of Medina	Rattle N Roll	
UAE Derby	1,900 metres (~1 3/16 miles)	$2,000,000	2	Meydan	Mar 26 2022	Crown Pride	Summer Is Tomorrow	Island Falcon	Bendoog	
Florida Derby	1 1/8 miles	$1,000,000	1	Gulfstream	Apr 2 2022	White Abbarrio	Charge It	Simplification	Pappacap	
Arkansas Derby	1 1/8 miles	$1,250,000	1	Oaklawn Park	Apr 2 2022	Cyberknife	Barber Road	Secret Oath	Doppelganger	
Jeff Ruby	1 1/8 miles	$600,000	3	Turfway	Apr 2 2022	Tiz The Bomb	Tawny Port	Rich Strike	Dowagiac Chief	
Blue Grass Stakes	1 1/8 miles	$1,000,000	1	Keeneland	Apr 9 2022	Zandon	Smile Happy	Emmanuel	Golden Glider	
Santa Anita Derby	1 1/8 miles	$750,000	1	Santa Anita	Apr 9 2022	Taiba (Note: In order to be eligible for Road to the Kentucky Derby points, Taiba and Messier were transferred to Tim Yakteen.)	Messier	Happy Jack	Armagnac	
Wood Memorial	1 1/8 miles	$750,000	2	Aqueduct	Apr 9 2022	Mo Donegal	Early Voting	Skippylongstocking	A.P.'s Secret	

=== "Wild Card" events ===
Note: 1st=20 points; 2nd=8 points; 3rd=4 points; 4th=2 points

Race	Distance	Purse	Grade	Track	Date	1st	2nd	3rd	4th	Ref
Lexington	1 1/16 miles	$398,750	3	Keeneland	Apr 16 2022	Tawny Port	Major General	In Due Time	Ethereal Road	

== Japan Road to the Kentucky Derby ==
The Japan Road to the Kentucky Derby is intended to provide a place in the Derby starting gate to the top finisher in the series. If the connections of that horse decline the invitation, their place is offered to the second-place finisher and so on through the top four finishers. As none of the offers were accepted, this place in the starting gate reverts to the horses on the main road to the Derby.

Race	Distance	Track	Date	1st	2nd	3rd	4th	Ref
Cattleya Sho	1,600 metres (~1 mile)	Tokyo Racecourse	Nov 27 2021	Consigliere	Café Karma	Geraldo Barows	World Connector	
Zen-Nippon Nisai Yushun	1,600 metres (~1 mile)	Kawasaki Racecourse	Dec 15 2021	Dry Stout	Combustion	Praelude	Sekifu	
Hyacinth	1,600 metres (~1 mile)	Tokyo Racecourse	Feb 20 2022	Combustion	Geraldo Barows	ƒ Sea Vixen	El Paso	
Fukuryu	1,800 metres (~1 1/8 miles)	Nakayama Racecourse	Mar 26 2022	ƒ Delicada	Notturno	Peisha Es	Odilon	

Note: Cattleya Sho: 1st=10 points; 2nd=4 points; 3rd=2 points; 4th=1 point
Zen-Nippon Nisai Yushun: 1st=20 points; 2nd=8 points; 3rd=4 points; 4th=2 points
Hyacinth: 1st=30 points; 2nd=12 points; 3rd=6 points; 4th=3 points
Fukuyru : 1st=40 points; 2nd=16 points; 3rd=8 points; 4th=4 points
ƒ Filly

Qualification table

The top four horses (colored brown within the standings) are eligible to participate in the Kentucky Derby provided the horse is nominated.

Rank	Horse	Points	Eligible Earnings	Trainer	Owner	Ref
1	Delicada	40	$273,623	Naohiro Yoshida	Teruya Yoshida	
2	Combustion	38	$557,666	Keizo Ito	Godolphin	
3	Dry Scout	20	$524,096	Mitsunori Makiura		
4	Notturno	16	$179,305	Hidetaka Otonashi	Kaneko Makoto Holdings Co. Ltd.	
5	Geraldo Barows	14	$191,039	Ryo Terashima	Hirotsugu Inokuma	
6	Consigliere	10	$357,738	Yukio Inagaki	Kazumi Yoshida	
7	Piesha Es	8	$157,855	Kazuo Konishi	Naoto Kitajo	
8	Sea Vixon	6	$150,509	Kazuo Fujisawa	Yuji Hasegawa	
9	Praelude	4	$191,189			
10	Odilon	4	$170,109	Tamio Hamada	Yuki Hashimoto	
11	Café Karma	6	$150,470	Masaaki Koga	Koichi Nishikawa	
12	El Paso	3	$111,006	Ryo Takei	Isonami Isamu F Co., Ltd.	
13	Sekifu	2	$755,881			
14	World Connector	1	$86,152	Kazuo Fujisawa	Mataichiro Yamamoto	

Notes:

- brown highlight – qualified
- grey highlight – did not qualify

== European Road to the Kentucky Derby ==
The European Road to the Kentucky Derby is designed on a similar basis to the Japan Road and is intended to provide a place in the Derby starting gate to the top finisher in the series. If the connections of that horse decline the invitation, their place is offered to the second-place finisher and so on. As none of the offers were accepted, this place in the starting gate reverts to the horses on the main road to the Derby.

The series consists of seven races – four run on the turf in late 2021 when the horses are age two, plus three races run on a synthetic surface in early 2022.

Race	Distance	Track	Date	1st	2nd	3rd	4th	Ref
Royal Lodge Stakes	1 mile	Newmarket	Sep 25 2021	Royal Patronage	Coroebus	Unconquerable	Masekela	
Beresford Stakes	1 mile	The Curragh	Sep 25 2021	Luxembourg	Manu Et Corde	Tuwaiq	Swan Bay	
Prix Jean-Luc Lagardère	1400 metres (6 furlongs & 211 yards)	Longchamp	Oct 3 2021	Angel Bleu	Noble Truth	Ancient Rome	Accakaba	
Vertem Futurity Trophy	1 mile	Doncaster	Oct 23 2021	Luxembourg	Sissoko	Bayside Boy	Hannibal Barca	
Road to the Kentucky Derby Conditions Stakes	1 mile	Kempton Park	Mar 2 2022	Blue Trail	Harrow	Find	Havana Goldrush	
Patton Stakes	1 mile	Dundalk	Mar 4 2022	Juncture	Morning Soldier	Sister Bridget	In Ecstasy	
Cardinal Stakes	1 mile	Chelmsford City	Mar 31 2022	Dark Moon Rising	Harrow	Find	Blue Trail	

Note:

- the four races in 2021 for two-year-olds: 1st=10 points; 2nd=4 points; 3rd=2 points; 4th=1 point
- the first two races in 2022: 1st=20 points; 2nd=8 points; 3rd=4 points; 4th=2 points
- The Cardinal Condition Stakes: 1st=30 points; 2nd=12 points; 3rd=6 points; 4th=3 points

Qualification table

The top four horses (colored brown within the standings) are eligible to participate in the Kentucky Derby provided the horse is nominated.

Rank	Horse	Points	Eligible Earnings	Trainer	Owner	Ref
1	Dark Moon Rising	30	$7,536	Kevin Ryan	Angie Bailey	
2	Blue Trail	23	$0	Charlie Appleby	Godolphin	
3	Luxembourg	20	$232,082	Aidan O'Brien	Westerberg, J Magnier, M Tabor & D Smith	
4	Harrow	20	$8,792	Andrew Balding	Highclere Thoroughbred Racing – Wisteria	
5	Angel Bleu	10	$572,160	Ralph Beckett	Marc Chan	
6	Royal Patronage	10	$155,467	Mark Johnston	Highclere T'Bred Racing – Woodland Walk	
7	Find	10	$0	John & Thady Gosden	Prince A. A. Faisal	
8	Noble Truth	4	$148,484	Charlie Appleby	Godolphin	
9	Coroebus	4	$75,735	Charlie Appleby	Godolphin	
10	Sissoko	4	$61,621	Aidan O'Brien	J Carthy	
11	Manu Et Corde	4	$29,903	Jim Bolger	J.S. Bolger	
12	Bayside Boy	2	$220,755	Roger Varian	Teme Valley & Ballylinch Stu	
13	Ancient Rome	2	$166,830	Andre Fabre	Michael Tabor	
14	Unconquerable	2	$45,914	Aidan O'Brien	Atlantic Thoroughbreds	
15	Tuwaiq	2	$20,665	Ger Lyons	Dr. Ali Al Mutairi	
16	Havana Goldrush	2	$0	Stan Moore	J S Moore & B Galloway	
17	Accakaba	1	$86,152	Christophe Ferland	Wertheimer & Frere	
18	Masekela	1	$86,252	Andrew Balding	Mick & Janice Mariscotti	
19	Hannibal Barca	1	$15,385	Joseph O'Brien	Ecurie Ama Zingteam	
20	Swan Bay	1	$5,240	Joseph O'Brien	Lloyd J Williams Syndicate	

Notes:

- brown highlight – qualified
- grey highlight – did not qualify
