= Smarty Jones Stakes =

Smarty Jones Stakes may refer to:

- Smarty Jones Stakes (Oaklawn Park), a thoroughbred horse race at Oaklawn Park Race Track in Hot Springs, Arkansas
- Smarty Jones Stakes (Parx), a Grade III thoroughbred horse race at Parx Casino and Racing in Bensalem, Pennsylvania
