= Jose Flores (jockey) =

Peruvian jockey (1960–2018)

Personal information
- Born: August 4, 1960 Peru
- Died: March 22, 2018 (aged 57) Philadelphia, Pennsylvania
- Occupation: Jockey

Horse racing career
- Sport: Horse racing
- Career wins: 4,650

Major racing wins
- Donald Le Vine Memorial Stakes (1999); Philadelphia Park Breeders' Cup Handicap (1999); Gallant Bob Handicap (2001, 2002); My Juliet Stakes (2001, 2003); Turf Monster Handicap (2006); Lyman Sprint Championship (2006, 2007); Pistol Packer Handicap (2006); Pennsylvania Nursery (2010); Auld Lang Syne Stakes (2012); Chick Lang Stakes (2012)

Racing awards
- Parx Racing Leading Jockey (2004)

Honors
- Parx Racing Hall of Fame (2013)
- Updated on June 5, 2020

Jose Luis Flores (August 4, 1960 – March 22, 2018) was a Peruvian jockey who spent most of his career in the United States, where he was a leading rider at race tracks in Pennsylvania.

== Life and career ==
Flores was born and apprenticed as a rider in Peru, where his father was also a jockey.

Starting in 1983 he raced in Panama at the Hipódromo Presidente Remón, winning 211 races. He moved to the United States in 1987, first to Miami and then to Pennsylvania, where he was the leading rider at Penn National Race Course in Grantville, Pennsylvania four times before changing in the late 1990s to Philadelphia Park, now Parx Casino and Racing, where he became the highest-earning jockey in the history of the track. In 2013 he was inducted into the Parx Hall of Fame.

He won 4,650 races out of 28,684, among the 42 winningest careers in North America, and placed in 7,975. In 1999 he won the Philadelphia Park Breeders' Cup Handicap on Loaded Gun. In his most successful year, 1987, he won 380 races out of 1,694. Since the mid-2010s his career had been slowed by injuries; his last win was on March 13, 2018.

== Death ==
On March 19, 2018, Flores was in the lead in a race at Parx when his mount, Love Rules, fell with a suspected shoulder fracture and he was thrown. Two other horses and their riders also fell but were not seriously injured; one horse may have fallen on Flores, who incurred grave head and spinal injuries and died on March 22 after being taken off life support. It was the first death known to the Jockeys' Guild of a jockey in Pennsylvania caused by a racing accident.

"He's been a mentor to other riders and a professional gentleman at all times. He's the epitome of what a jockey should be" is what Sam Elliott, Director of Racing at Parx, said about Jose Flores.

== Personal life ==
Flores was married to Joanne McDaid-Flores, herself a jockey from 2004 to 2016, and had three sons.
