= Cyberknife (horse) =

American-bred Thoroughbred racehorse

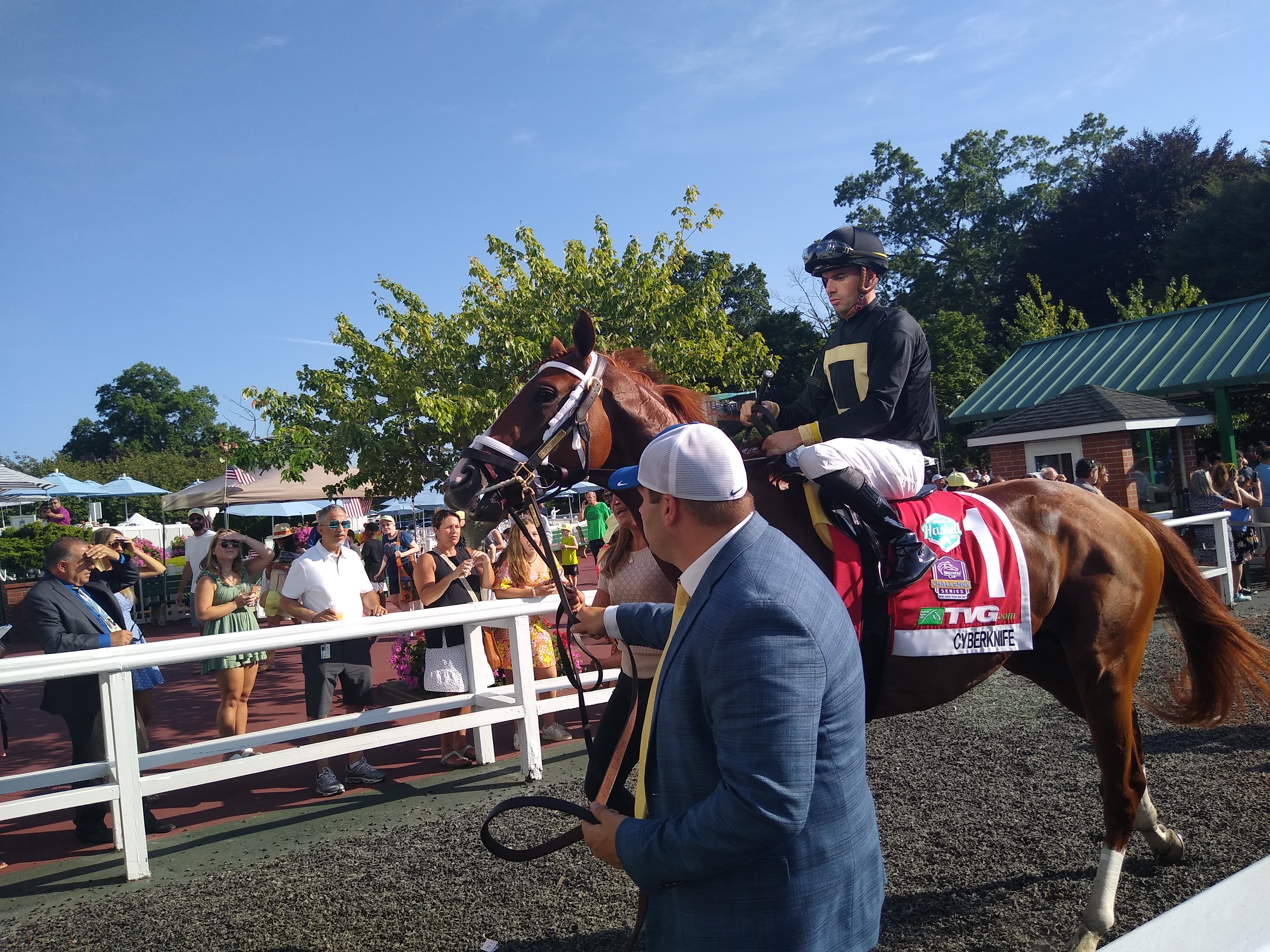
- Cyberknife walking out of the paddock before winning the 2022 Haskell.
- Sire: Gun Runner
- Grandsire: Candy Ride (ARG)
- Dam: Awesome Flower
- Damsire: Flower Alley
- Sex: Stallion
- Foaled: 14 March 2019
- Country: United States
- Color: Chestnut
- Breeder: Kenneth L. and Sarah K. Ramsey
- Owner: Gold Square
- Trainer: Brad H. Cox
- Record: 13: 5-4-1
- Earnings: $2,137,520

Major wins
- Arkansas Derby (2022); Matt Winn Stakes (2022); Haskell Stakes (2022)
- Last updated on 28 January 2023

Cyberknife (foaled 14 March 2019) is a retired American Thoroughbred racehorse who has won multiple Grade I events as a three-year-old in 2022 including the Arkansas Derby and Haskell Stakes.

== Background ==
Cyberknife is a chestnut stallion that was bred in Kentucky by Kenneth L. and Sarah K. Ramsey. His sire is Gun Runner, the 2017 American Horse of the Year and stands at Three Chimneys Farm and his dam is Awesome Flower who was sired by the 2005 Travers Stakes winner Flower Alley.

He was bought by Joe Hardoon on behalf of Al Gold's Gold Square, for US$400,000 from the Kenneth L. and Sarah K. Ramsey's Ramsey Farm consignment at the 2020 Fasig-Tipton Selected Yearlings Showcase. He is the fourth foal and first stakes winner for Awesome Flower.

== Racing career ==
=== 2021: Two-year-old season ===
Cyberknife began his racing career on 25 September in a Maiden Special Weight event over 6 furlongs at Churchill Downs. Starting as the 6/5 favorite in a field of nine, he began awkwardly, recovering to stalk the leader, then forging ahead three wide while shifting inwards and bumping Hoist the Gold in upper stretch. He dueled that rival while maintaining a narrow margin through the lane and prevailed. However, after a stewards’ inquiry into the incident in the stretch, Cyberknife was disqualified and placed second.

On 5 November, he returned to the track at Churchill Downs in a Maiden Special Weight event over 6 1/2 furlongs. Starting as the 2/5 favorite, Cyberknife tracked the pace early, was in the four path into the lane, made a bid down the lane, drifted out a bit, then lugged in and did not have enough in the final stages to defeat Classic Moment.

For his third attempt to break his maiden, Cyberknife was moved to the Fair Grounds in New Orleans where he on 26 December broke his maiden over the 1 1/16 miles distance, holding off Jeeper by 1/2 length.

=== 2022: Three-year-old season ===
On 22 January, Cyberknife faced eight rivals in his first run in a graded event, the Grade III Lecomte Stakes at the Fair Grounds. He settled off of the pace four wide, inched closer in the five path and outside of rivals around the far turn to attempt a bid approaching the lane but flattened out in upper stretch to finish sixth, beaten by over 10 lengths.

On 19 February, Cyberknife dropped in class to an Allowance Optional Claiming event over 1 1/16 miles and dispatched his 9 foes as the 9/5 favorite, winning by three lengths.

In his next start on 2 April, Cyberknife at odds of nearly 6/1 won the Grade I Arkansas Derby at Oaklawn Park by 2 3/4 lengths over Barber Road and the filly Secret Oath, securing 100 points for the Kentucky Derby and qualifying for the event. Trainer Brad Cox commented, "This is a good colt. We've liked him for a long, long, time. I was a little taken back by his Lecomte but he ran very well in the allowance race. He's not polished mentally but he's getting there all the time. The more he races, the better he'll get. He's starting to put it all together."

In the Kentucky Derby Cyberknife failed to fire, finishing well back in eighteenth place after being fanned eight wide into the first turn.

One month later, he was entered in the Grade III Matt Winn Stakes and as the 1/2 favorite prevailed by a nose over Howling Time. Jockey Florent Geroux commented, "He was traveling well and (Howling Time) was really game on my inside. We were battling the whole stretch. I couldn’t tell which one of us won, but I’m glad it was Cyberknife."

Six weeks later, Cyberknife travelled to the Jersey Shore track of Monmouth Park for the Grade I Haskell Stakes. Facing a field including undefeated Jack Christopher, he was made 8/1 fourth pick in a field of eight. With a patient ride by regular rider Florent Geroux, he surged to a head victory in a track-record time of 1:46.24 for 1 1/8 miles over the Bob Baffert-trained Taiba with Jack Christopher (3/5on) in third place. Al Gold, whose Gold Square owns Cyberknife and who calls Monmouth Park his home away from home, commented, "I have a lot of great memories here, and this is the best horse I've ever had. It's his second grade 1. It's a special feeling. There are no words to describe it."

The Travers Stakes on 27 August attracted the top three finishers in the Kentucky Derby: (Rich Strike, Epicenter, and Zandon). Other entries included Preakness winner Early Voting and Cyberknife. Cyberknife started as the 9/2-second favorite and set moderate fractions for the first three-quarters of a mile. Epicenter then began his move on the outside, taking the lead at the quarter-pole. He continued to draw away down the stretch to win by 5 1/4 lengths with Cyberknife finishing second, Zandon third, and Rich Strike fourth.

== Statistics ==
Date	Distance	Race	Grade	Track	Odds	Field	Finish	Winning Time	Winning (Losing) Margin	Jockey	Ref
2021 – Two-year-old season
25 Sep 2021	6 furlongs	Maiden Special Weight		Churchill Downs	1.20*	9	2 (Note: Cyberknife was first past the post but was disqualified for interference in the upper stretch and was placed second)	1:09.64	1/2 length	Martin Garcia	
5 Nov 2021	6 1/2 furlongs	Maiden Special Weight		Churchill Downs	0.40*	10	2	1:16.68	(1/2 length)	Martin Garcia	
26 Dec 2021	1 1/16 miles	Maiden Special Weight		Fair Grounds	0.50*	9	1	1:44.90	1/2 length	Florent Geroux	
2022 – Three-year-old season
22 Jan 2022	1 1/16 miles	Lecomte Stakes	III	Fair Grounds	5.20	9	6	1:44.36	(10 1/2 lengths)	Florent Geroux	
19 Feb 2022	1 1/16 miles	Allowance Optional Claiming		Fair Grounds	1.80*	10	1	1:42.53	3 lengths	Florent Geroux	
2 Apr 2022	1 1/8 miles	Arkansas Derby	I	Oaklawn Park	5.80	9	1	1:50.42	2 3/4 lengths	Florent Geroux	
7 May 2022	1 1/4 miles	Kentucky Derby	I	Churchill Downs	14.90	20	18	2:02.61	(42 3/4 lengths)	Florent Geroux	
12 Jun 2022	1 1/16 miles	Matt Winn Stakes	III	Churchill Downs	0.50*	7	1	1:41.98	nose	Florent Geroux	
23 Jul 2022	1 1/8 miles	Haskell Stakes	I	Monmouth Park	7.80	8	1	1:46.24 (Note: Cyberknife set a new track record for the 1 1/8 miles distance at Monmouth Park)	head	Florent Geroux	
27 Aug 2022	1 1/4 miles	Travers Stakes	I	Saratoga	4.50	8	2	2:00.72	(5 1/4 lengths)	Florent Geroux	
24 Sep 2022	1 1/8 miles	Pennsylvania Derby	I	Parx Racing	4.10	11	3	1:48.67	(6 3/4 lengths)	Florent Geroux	
5 Nov 2022	1 mile	Breeders' Cup Dirt Mile	I	Keeneland	3.26	9	2	1:35.33	(head)	Florent Geroux	
2023 – Four-year-old season
29 Jan 2023	1 1/8 miles	Pegasus World Cup	I	Gulfstream Park	2.10*	12	6	1:49.44	(9 3/4 lengths)	Florent Geroux	

An (*) asterisk after the odds means Cyberknife was the post-time favorite.

== Breeding ==
On 7 August 2022 that Cyberknife's breeding rights had been acquired by Spendthrift Farm. Owner Gold commented "I'm excited about teaming with Spendthrift on Cyberknife, and I look forward to watching him have a productive stallion career." In 2023 Cyberknife would stand for a fee of $30,000.

== Pedigree ==
Pedigree of Cyberknife, chestnut colt, 14 March 2019
Sire Gun Runner (2013)	Candy Ride (ARG) (1999)	Ride the Rails (1991)	Cryptoclearance (1984)
Sire Gun Runner (2013)	Candy Ride (ARG) (1999)	Ride the Rails (1991)	Herbalesian (1969)
Sire Gun Runner (2013)	Candy Ride (ARG) (1999)	Candy Girl (ARG) (1990	Candy Stripes (1982)
Sire Gun Runner (2013)	Candy Ride (ARG) (1999)	Candy Girl (ARG) (1990	City Girl (ARG) (1982)
Sire Gun Runner (2013)	Quiet Giant (2007)	Giant's Causeway (1997)	Storm Cat (1983)
Sire Gun Runner (2013)	Quiet Giant (2007)	Giant's Causeway (1997)	Mariah's Storm (1991)
Sire Gun Runner (2013)	Quiet Giant (2007)	Quiet Dance (1993)	Quiet American (1986)
Sire Gun Runner (2013)	Quiet Giant (2007)	Quiet Dance (1993)	Misty Dancer (1988)
Dam Awesome Flower (2009)	Flower Alley (2002)	Distorted Humor (1993)	Forty Niner (1985)
Dam Awesome Flower (2009)	Flower Alley (2002)	Distorted Humor (1993)	Danzig's Beauty (1987)
Dam Awesome Flower (2009)	Flower Alley (2002)	Princess Olivia (1995)	Lycius (1988)
Dam Awesome Flower (2009)	Flower Alley (2002)	Princess Olivia (1995)	Dance Image (IRE) (1990)
Dam Awesome Flower (2009)	Formalities Aside (2002)	Awesome Again (Canada) (1994)	Deputy Minister (Canada) (1979)
Dam Awesome Flower (2009)	Formalities Aside (2002)	Awesome Again (Canada) (1994)	Primal Force (1987)
Dam Awesome Flower (2009)	Formalities Aside (2002)	Well Dressed (1997)	Notebook (1985)
Dam Awesome Flower (2009)	Formalities Aside (2002)	Well Dressed (1997)	Trithenia (1992)(family 8h)
