= Taiba =

American-bred Thoroughbred racehorse

- Sire: Gun Runner
- Grandsire: Candy Ride (ARG)
- Dam: Needmore Flattery
- Damsire: Flatter
- Sex: Stallion
- Foaled: April 13, 2019 (age 6)
- Country: United States
- Color: Chestnut
- Breeder: Bruce C. Ryan
- Owner: Zedan Racing Stables
- Trainer: 1. Bob Baffert (March 2022); 2. Tim Yakteen (Apr–Jun 2022); 3. Bob Baffert (July 2022–)
- Record: 8: 4-1-1
- Earnings: $2,356,200

Major wins
- Santa Anita Derby (2022); Pennsylvania Derby (2022); Malibu Stakes (2022)
- Last updated on 26 February 2023

Taiba (foaled April 13, 2019) is a retired American Thoroughbred racehorse who has won multiple Grade I events as a three-year-old in 2022 including the Santa Anita Derby and Malibu Stakes at Santa Anita Park and Pennsylvania Derby at Parx Racing.

== Background ==
Taiba is a chestnut stallion that was bred in Kentucky by Bruce Ryan who has been breeding and raising horses for more than 30 years. The founder of Ryan's All-Glass, a commercial custom glass company in Cincinnati, started out with Quarter Horses but soon discovered he had better opportunities to make money with Thoroughbreds.

His sire is Gun Runner, the 2017 American Horse of the Year and stands at Three Chimneys Farm and his dam is Needmore Flattery, a daughter of Flatter that won nine black-type stakes on her way to earning $732,103. Her granddam Kiosk, was from Eutrophia Farms at the 2001 Ohio Thoroughbred Breeders and Owners Fall Mixed Sale after she was bought back on a final bid of $6,700. Kiosk became a five-time stakes-placed winner of $115,649. She has produced eight winners from eight to race including Needmore Flattery.

Zach Madden consigned the colt as a yearling for Bruce Ryan at the 2020 Fasig-Tipton Kentucky October Yearling Sale where longtime partners Randy Hartley and Dean De Renzo bought him for $140,000. Hartley and De Renzo then pinhooked Taiba to the 2021 Fasig-Tipton Gulfstream Sale of select two-year-olds in training, selling him for $1.7 million to agent Gary Young for Zedan Racing Stables.

Taiba was initially trained by Bob Baffert but after his maiden win his owners considered the horse a possibility to run in the Kentucky Derby they moved the horse to Tim Yakteen for his second start in the Santa Anita Derby so as to obtain qualification points to garner a start in the event. Yakteen took over the training of Taiba, not long before their previous trainer, Bob Baffert, began serving a 90-day suspension stemming from Medina Spirit's positive test after last year's Kentucky Derby. Churchill Downs in 2021 announced that no horses in Baffert's care would be eligible to earn points on the Road to the Kentucky Derby.

After completing in the Kentucky Derby, in June Taiba returned to Bob Baffert's stable.

== Career ==
=== 2022: Three-year-old season ===
Taiba made his debut on March 5 in a Maiden Special Weight event over 6 furlongs at Santa Anita. Starting as the 1/2 odds-on favorite, he dueled for command up the backstretch, vying with Mauritius and Magicnthemoonlight while along the rail on the turn, then inched ahead with a quarter-mile remaining, shaking free at the top of the stretch and powering away to a 7 1/2-length victory in a fast time of 1:09.97.

One month later, owner Amr Zedan, jumped the colt from his six-furlong maiden victory to the Grade 1 Santa Anita Derby event over the 1 1/8-mile distance. Trainer Tim Yakteen said a few days before the race that it was "going to be a bit of an ask" for the chestnut colt to win. Yakteen also said that Taiba had been training forwardly and that "he has impressed very much in the morning." Veteran jockey Mike Smith picked up the mount after John Velazquez chose to ride stablemate Messier. Taiba started well and was in range of leaders Forbidden Kingdom and Messier early, then ranged up three wide to challenge in the stretch. Taiba caught Messier approaching the final sixteenth and drew off for the win, stopping the timer in 1:48.46. With the win, Taiba gained enough qualification points to start in the Kentucky Derby.

In the Kentucky Derby, Taiba was no factor and finished twelfth in a field of twenty, beaten by nearly 18 lengths to longshot Rich Strike.

After a ten-week break, Taiba started in the Grade 1 Haskell Stakes at Monmouth Park. He battled with Arkansas Derby winner Cyberknife through the straight to come up short by a head in a track-record time of 1:46.24 for the 1 1/8-mile distance. Trainer Bob Baffert said, "Mike (Smith) had him in a spot to win and we just came up short. Cyberknife got a great trip. (Taiba) was stuck down there and he was not happy being stuck behind horses. I was really worried at about the three-eighths pole. Mike said that when he got him out in the clear, he just kicked in."

After resting the colt on the West Coast, Baffert brought him out on September 24 to Parx Racing near Philadelphia for the Grade 1 Pennsylvania Derby against a field of three-year-olds that included Cyberknife, GI Blue Grass Stakes winner Zandon, and recently third in the GI Travers Stakes and GII West Virginia Derby winner Skippylongstockin. As the 7/5 favorite, Taiba posted a three-length victory over Zandon with Cyberknife in third, nearly four more lengths away, in a time of 1:48.67. After winning the event for the fourth time, Baffert said, "It was a tough race, a good field. The main thing is that he ran his race. Lately he has been very willing. I can see the improvement. Today was his day. I really think he is starting to figure it out."

Taiba finished third to Flightline in the 2022 Breeders' Cup Classic at Keeneland Racecourse.

On opening day of the Santa Anita Park's 2022–23 Winter-Sprint meeting, Taiba ran in the Grade 1 Malibu Stakes. Starting as the 2/5 odds-on favorite in the seven furlong sprint for three-year-olds, Taiba ridden by jockey Mike E. Smith started well and followed leader Forbidden Kingdom. When Taiba reached the top of the stretch, it appeared that maybe he wouldn't have the punch he needed, but that was an illusion. Taiba kicked in, pulling alongside Forbidden Kingdom, and then drew away to score by 4 1/4 lengths in 1:21.75. Forbidden Kingdom finished three-quarters of a length in front of third-place Hoist the Gold.

== Retirement ==
On September 18, 2023, connections announced that Taiba was retired from racing and would stand at Spendthrift Farm for an introductory fee of $35,000.

=== Stud career ===
The first foal by Taiba, a chestnut colt out of multiple grade 2 winner Exaggerator mare Wecallherqueenmary, was born on January 6 at Castleton Lyons near Lexington, Kentucky.

== Statistics ==
Date	Distance	Race	Grade	Track	Odds	Field	Finish	Winning Time	Winning (Losing) Margin	Jockey	Ref
2022 – Three-year-old season
Mar 5, 2022	6 furlongs	Maiden Special Weight		Santa Anita	0.50*	7	1	1:09.97	7 1/2 lengths	John Velazquez	
Apr 9, 2022	1 1/8 miles	Santa Anita Derby	I	Santa Anita	4.30	6	1	1:48.46	2 1/4 lengths	Mike E. Smith	
May 7, 2022	1 1/4 miles	Kentucky Derby	I	Churchill Downs	5.80	20	12	2:02.61	(17 3/4 lengths)	Mike E. Smith	
Jul 23, 2022	1 1/8 miles	Haskell Stakes	I	Monmouth Park	2.10	8	2	1:46.24 (Note: Winner of the event Cyberknife set a new track record for the 1 1/8 miles distance at Monmouth Park)	(head)	Mike E. Smith	
Sep 24, 2022	1 1/8 miles	Pennsylvania Derby	I	Parx Racing	1.40*	11	1	1:48.67	3 lengths	Mike E. Smith	
Nov 5, 2022	1 1/4 miles	Breeders' Cup Classic	I	Keeneland	8.26	8	3	2:00.05	(8 3/4 lengths)	Mike E. Smith	
Dec 26, 2022	7 furlongs	Malibu Stakes	I	Santa Anita	0.40*	8	1	1:21.75	4 1/4 lengths	Mike E. Smith	
2023 – Four-year-old season
Feb 25, 2023	1800 metres	Saudi Cup	I	King Abdulaziz Racetrack	N/A (Note: Wagering is not allowed in Saudi Arabia. In British wagering, Taiba was the 15/8 favorite.)	13	8	1:50.79	(7 3/4 lengths)	Mike E. Smith	

An (*) asterisk after the odds means Taiba was the post-time favorite.

== Pedigree ==
Pedigree of Taiba, chestnut colt, April 13, 2019
Sire Gun Runner (2013)	Candy Ride (ARG) (1999)	Ride the Rails (1991)	Cryptoclearance (1984)
Sire Gun Runner (2013)	Candy Ride (ARG) (1999)	Ride the Rails (1991)	Herbalesian (1969)
Sire Gun Runner (2013)	Candy Ride (ARG) (1999)	Candy Girl (ARG) (1990)	Candy Stripes (1982)
Sire Gun Runner (2013)	Candy Ride (ARG) (1999)	Candy Girl (ARG) (1990)	City Girl (ARG) (1982)
Sire Gun Runner (2013)	Quiet Giant (2007)	Giant's Causeway (1997)	Storm Cat (1983)
Sire Gun Runner (2013)	Quiet Giant (2007)	Giant's Causeway (1997)	Mariah's Storm (1991)
Sire Gun Runner (2013)	Quiet Giant (2007)	Quiet Dance (1993)	Quiet American (1986)
Sire Gun Runner (2013)	Quiet Giant (2007)	Quiet Dance (1993)	Misty Dancer (1988)
Dam Needmore Flattery (2011)	Flatter (1999)	A. P. Indy (1989)	Seattle Slew (1974)
Dam Needmore Flattery (2011)	Flatter (1999)	A. P. Indy (1989)	Weekend Surprise (1980)
Dam Needmore Flattery (2011)	Flatter (1999)	Praise (1994)	Mr. Prospector (1970)
Dam Needmore Flattery (2011)	Flatter (1999)	Praise (1994)	Wild Applause (1981)
Dam Needmore Flattery (2011)	Kiosk (2000)	Left Banker (1993)	Afleet (Canada) (1984)
Dam Needmore Flattery (2011)	Kiosk (2000)	Left Banker (1993)	Du Marche (1978)
Dam Needmore Flattery (2011)	Kiosk (2000)	Phone Switch (1993)	Phone Trick (1982)
Dam Needmore Flattery (2011)	Kiosk (2000)	Phone Switch (1993)	Grand Glory (1982)(family 8j)
