= Dr. James Penny Memorial Stakes =

- Class: Listed
- Location: Parx Casino and Racing; Bensalem, Pennsylvania, United States
- Inaugurated: 2000 (as Dr. James Penny Memorial Handicap)
- Race type: Thoroughbred – Flat racing
- Website: www.parxracing.com

Race information
- Distance: 1 1/16 miles
- Surface: Turf
- Track: left-handed
- Qualification: fillies and mares, three years old and older
- Weight: Base weights with allowances: Older: 126 lbs 3YOs: 122 lbs
- Purse: $200,000 (since 2014)

The Dr. James Penny Memorial Stakes is a Listed American Thoroughbred horse race for fillies and mares that are three years old or older, over a distance of 1 1/16 miles on the turf held annually in July at Parx Casino and Racing racetrack in Bensalem, Pennsylvania. The event currently carries a purse of $200,000.

== History ==
The race was inaugurated in 2000 with an attractive purse offered of $100,000 as the Dr. James Penny Memorial Handicap. The event was named in honor of Dr. James Penny V.M.D. (1921–1999), the track veterinarian for over 25 years at Liberty Bell and stayed on when thoroughbred racing moved to Keystone Race Track.

In 2012 the event was upgraded to a Grade III.

The 2018 running was moved off the turf track due to the conditions and run on a sloppy track.

In 2023 the event was downgraded to Listed was not scheduled by Parx Racing.

== Records ==
Speed record:

- 1 1/16 miles – 1:40.74 – Assateague (2014)

Margins:

- 7 1/4 lengths – Divine Miss Grey (2018)

Most Wins:

- 2 – Princess Grace (2021, 2022)

Most wins by a jockey:

- 2 – Heberto Castillo Jr. (2001, 2003)
- 2 – Harry Vega (2004, 2007)
- 2 – Joel Rosario (2013, 2014)
- 2 – Joe Bravo (2017, 2021)

Most wins by a trainer:

- 4 – William I. Mott (2001, 2003, 2006, 2008)

Most wins by an owner:

- 2 – WinStar Farm (2000, 2008)
- 2 – John and Susan Moore (2021, 2022)

== Winners ==
Year	Winner	Age	Jockey	Trainer	Owner	Distance	Time	Purse	Grade	Ref
Dr. James Penny Memorial Stakes
2023	Race not held									
2022	Princess Grace	5	Florent Geroux	Michael Stidham	John and Susan Moore	1 1/16 miles	1:43.70	$200,000	III	
2021	Princess Grace	4	Joe Bravo	Michael Stidham	John and Susan Moore	1 1/16 miles	1:41.18	$200,000	III	
2020	Race not held									
2019	Notapradaprice	5	Frankie Pennington	John C. Servis	Main Line Racing Stable	abt. 1 1/16 miles	1:45.49	$202,000	III	
2018	Divine Miss Grey	4	Junior Alvarado	Danny Gargan	Corms Racing Stable & R.A. Hill Stable	1 1/16 miles	1:43.49	$182,000	Listed	On dirt
2017	Fourstar Crook	5	Joe Bravo	Chad C. Brown	Michael Dubb, Bethlehem Stables & Gary Aisquith	1 1/16 miles	1:42.78	$200,000	III	
2016	Zipessa	4	Florent Geroux	Michael Stidham	Empyrean Stables	1 1/16 miles	1:41.42	$200,000	III	
Dr. James Penny Memorial Handicap
2015	Coffee Clique	5	Manuel Franco	Brian A. Lynch	Amerman Racing (Jerry & Joan Amerman)	1 1/16 miles	1:42.64	$200,000	III	
2014	Assateague	5	Joel Rosario	Michael R. Matz	Helen Alexander, Dorothy Matz & Helen Groves	1 1/16 miles	1:40.74	$200,000	III	
2013	Somali Lemonade	4	Joel Rosario	Michael R. Matz	Caroline A. Forgason	1 1/16 miles	1:47.83	$250,000	III	
2012	Gitchee Goomie	5	Alan Garcia	Richard A. Violette Jr.	Patsy C. Symons	1 1/16 miles	1:41.23	$250,000	III	
2011	Daveron (GER)	6	Eddie Castro	H. Graham Motion	Team Valor International	abt. 1 1/16 miles	1:43.34	$200,000	Listed	
2010	Cherokee Queen	5	Julien R. Leparoux	Martin D. Wolfson	Farnsworth Stables	1 1/16 miles	1:41.33	$200,000	Listed	
2009	Carribean Sunset (IRE)	4	Ramon A. Dominguez	Christophe Clement	Don & Joan Cimpl, Jon & Sara Kelly	1 1/16 miles	1:44.59	$200,000	Listed	
2008	Sharp Susan	4	Kent J. Desormeaux	William I. Mott	IEAH Stables, WinStar Farm & Pegasus Holdings Group Stable	1 1/16 miles	1:42.50	$200,000	Listed	
2007	High Moment	4	Harry Vega	Rodney Jenkins	Richard W. Brown, Mr. & Mrs. D.R. Palmer	1 1/16 miles	1:42.87	$100,000	Listed	
2006	Pommes Frites	4	José A. Santos	William I. Mott	Haras Santa Maria de Arara	1 1/16 miles	1:44.93	$100,000	Listed	
2005	Spring Season	6	Victor H. Molina	Jonathan E. Sheppard	Augustin Stable	1 1/16 miles	1:46.20	$100,000	Listed	
2004	Lady of the Future	6	Harry Vega	Thomas M. Greene	Max H. Pearson	1 1/16 miles	1:43.80	$100,000	Listed	
2003	Delta Princess	4	Heberto Castillo Jr.	William I. Mott	Saud bin Khaled	1 1/16 miles	1:42.48	$100,000	Listed	
2002	Babae (CHI)	6	Michael J. Luzzi	Frank A. Alexander	Joseph P. Platt Jr.	1 1/16 miles	1:46.86	$100,000	Listed	
2001	Iftiraas (GB)	4	Heberto Castillo Jr.	William I. Mott	Gary A. Tanaka	1 1/16 miles	1:44.41	$100,000	Listed	
2000	License Fee	5	Larry Melancon	W. Elliott Walden	WinStar Farm	1 1/16 miles	1:44.93	$100,000	Listed	

Turf Dirt

== See also ==
- List of American and Canadian Graded races
