= Gallant Bob Stakes =

- Class: Grade II
- Location: Parx Casino and Racing; Bensalem, Pennsylvania, United States
- Inaugurated: 1979
- Race type: Thoroughbred - Flat racing
- Website: Parx

Race information
- Distance: 6 furlongs
- Surface: Dirt
- Track: left-handed
- Qualification: Three years old
- Weight: 124 lbs. with allowances GI winners 2 lbs. added
- Purse: $400,000 (2023)

The Gallant Bob Stakes is a Grade II American Thoroughbred horse race for three years olds, over a distance of six furlongs on the dirt held annually in September at Parx Casino and Racing racetrack in Bensalem, Pennsylvania. The event currently carries a purse of $400,000.

== History ==
The race was inaugurated in 1979 as the Gallant Bob Handicap after the horse Gallant Bob who was the first Pennsylvania based horse to earn an Eclipse Award in 1975. The inaugural even was run with conditions of four year olds and older and was held in January.

The event had a lengthy absence of 11 years of twelve years between 1987 and 1998 and when the event resumed in 1999 conditions were changed that the event was only for three year olds.

In 2013 the event was upgraded to a Grade III and in 2019 the event was upgraded to a Grade II.

== Records ==
Speed record:

- 6 furlongs – 1:07.51 - Royal Currier (2011)
- 7 furlongs – 1:22.40 - Georgeandthedragon (1981)

Margins:

- 3 3/4 lengths – Royal Currier (2011)

Most wins by a jockey

- 2 – Eibar Coa (2004, 2009)
- 2 – Stewart Elliott (2010, 2011)
- 2 – Jose Luis Flores (2001, 2002)
- 2 – John Neid Jr. (1979, 1984)
- 2 – Joel Rosario (2019, 2021)
- 2 – John R. Velazquez (2017, 2022)
- 2 – Irad Ortiz Jr. (2018, 2024)

Most wins by a trainer

- 3 – Guadalupe Preciado (2014, 2022, 2024)

Most wins by an owner

- 2 – Nicholas Cammarano Jr. (2022, 2024)

== Winners ==
Year	Winner	Age	Jockey	Trainer	Owner	Distance	Time	Purse	Grade	Ref
Gallant Bob Stakes
2026	Stradale	3	Jose L. Ortiz	Steven M. Asmussen	Kaleem Shah	6 furlongs	1:09.83	$400,000	II	
2025	Mad House	3	Paco Lopez	David Vanwinkle	James Thares	6 furlongs	1:08.77	$400,000	II	
2024	Bentornato	3	Irad Ortiz Jr.	Guadalupe Preciado	Nicholas Cammarano Jr.	6 furlongs	1:09.92	$400,000	II	
2023	Damon's Mound	3	Junior Alvarado	Michelle Lovell	Michele Love & Cliff Love	6 furlongs	1:10.24	$400,000	II	
2022	Scaramouche	3	John R. Velazquez	Guadalupe Preciado	Nicholas Cammarano Jr.	6 furlongs	1:10.38	$300,000	II	
2021	Jackie's Warrior	3	Joel Rosario	Steve Asmussen	J.Kirk & Judy Robison	6 furlongs	1:08.64	$300,000	II	
2020	Race not held									
2019	King Jack	3	Joel Rosario	Jerry Hollendorfer	Michael C. Stinson	6 furlongs	1:08.89	$300,000	II	
2018	Firenze Fire	3	Irad Ortiz Jr.	Jason Servis	Mr. Amore Stable	6 furlongs	1:11.27	$300,000	III	
2017	Coal Front	3	John R. Velazquez	Todd A. Pletcher	Robert V. LaPenta & Head of Plains Partners	6 furlongs	1:08.94	$300,000	III	
2016	Noholdingback Bear	3	Eurico Rosa Da Silva	Michael P. De Paulo	Bear Stables	6 furlongs	1:09.61	$300,000	III	
2015	Trouble Kid	3	Joshua Navarro	Ramon Preciado	Barbara Hopkins	6 furlongs	1:10.56	$300,000	III	
2014	Favorite Tale	3	John Bisono	Guadalupe Preciado	PJG Stable	6 furlongs	1:08.16	$300,000	III	
2013	City of Weston	3	Paco Lopez	Antonio Sano	Cloud Nine Lumoni	6 furlongs	1:09.63	$300,000	III	
2012	Well Spelled	3	Pablo Fragoso	Benjamin W. Perkins Jr.	GSP Racing Stable	6 furlongs	1:09.88	$300,000	Listed	
2011	Royal Currier	3	Stewart Elliott	Patricia Farro	MAT Stables	6 furlongs	1:07.51	$250,000	Listed	
2010	Bank Merger	3	Stewart Elliott	Kiaran P. McLaughlin	Darley Stable	6 furlongs	1:09.31	$250,000	Listed	
Gallant Bob Handicap
2009	Pashito the Che	3	Eibar Coa	Scott A. Lake	Tuna Stables and Off The Hook Racing	6 furlongs	1:08.42	$250,000	Listed	
2008	Rollers	3	Michael J. Luzzi	Barclay Tagg	Lael Stables	6 furlongs	1:09.48	$250,000	Listed	
2007	Premium Wine	3	Harry Vega	Anthony W. Dutrow	Zayat Stables	6 furlongs	1:09.93	$250,000	Listed	
2006	Diabolical	3	Mario G. Pino	Steve Klesaris	Puglisi Racing & Steve Klesaris	6 furlongs	1:08.40	$97,000	Listed	
2005	Joey Carson	3	Anthony S. Black	Timothy F. Ritchey	Big Daddy Stables	6 furlongs	1:10.29	$100,000	Listed	
2004	Abbondanza	3	Eibar Coa	Timothy J. Tullock Jr.	Germania Farms	6 furlongs	1:08.11	$100,000	Listed	
2003	Northern Air	3	Joseph Rocco	Mark Shuman	Michael J. Gill	6 furlongs	1:10.16	$150,000	Listed	
2002	Thunderello	3	Jose Flores	Scott A. Lake	Charles G. Mady	6 furlongs	1:09.83	$150,000	Listed	
2001	Sea of Green	3	Jose Flores	Janis L. Gerace	Janis L. Gerace	6 furlongs	1:11.14	$150,000	Listed	
2000	Ultimate Warrior	3	Roberto Alvarado Jr.	Bernard S. Flint	Bernard S. Flint & James Ryan	6 furlongs	1:09.41	$150,000	Listed	
1999	Valid Trefaire	3	Jorge F. Chavez	Emanuel Tortora	James R. Lewis Jr.	6 furlongs	1:08.93	$140,000	Listed	
1987–1998		Race not held								
1986	Berngoo	4	Danny Wright	James P. Simpson	A. Rettaliata	6 furlongs	1:09.60	$42,830		
1985	Rocky Knave	4	Danny Nied	Robert Camac	Appleton & Nix	7 furlongs	1:23.00	$29,075		
1984	Two Davids	4	John Neid Jr.	Dennis Heimer	Stanley Joselson	6 furlongs	1:09.60	$28,350		
1983	Race not held									
1982	Main Stem	4	Rochelle F. Lee	Mark J. Reid	Tresvant Stable	7 furlongs	1:23.20	$28,975		
1981	Georgeandthedragon	4	Jorge Tejeira	Mark Perlsweig	SKS Stable	7 furlongs	1:22.40	$28,200		
1980	Our Gary	4	Herb McCauley	Daniel Perlsweig	Edgehill Farm	7 furlongs	1:23.60	$27,750		
1979	Al Battah	4	John Neid Jr.	William Pricket	William Pricket	7 furlongs	1:22.60	$27,075		

== See also ==
- List of American and Canadian Graded races
