= Woody Stephens Stakes =

- Class: Grade I
- Location: Belmont Park; Elmont, New York, United States
- Inaugurated: 1985
- Race type: Thoroughbred – Flat racing
- Website: www.nyra.com/index_belmont.html

Race information
- Distance: 7 Furlongs
- Surface: Dirt
- Track: left-handed
- Qualification: Three-year-olds
- Weight: 124 lbs. with allowances
- Purse: US$500,000 (2024)

The Woody Stephens Stakes is a Grade I American Thoroughbred horse race for three-year-olds run over a distance of seven furlongs on dirt held annually in early June at Belmont Park in Elmont, New York.

== History ==
Inaugurated in 1985 as the Riva Ridge Stakes, it was named in honor of the Hall of Fame inductee and Kentucky Derby winner, Riva Ridge. In 2006, it was renamed in memory of Hall of Fame trainer Woody Stephens, who won eight U.S. Triple Crown races including a record five consecutive editions of the Belmont Stakes.

The event was classified as a Grade III in 1988, upgraded to a Grade II event in 1998, and in 2019 it was upgraded to Grade I.

The race is part of the undercard for the Belmont Stakes and often includes horses that are cutting back in distance after attempting to qualify on the Road to the Kentucky Derby.

The event has been won by champions including Lost in the Fog in 2005 who that year was the American Champion Sprint Horse, and the 1990 Champion 2YO Fly So Free. Also the 2014 winner Bayern would later that year win the Breeders' Cup Classic.

In 2024 the event was moved to Saratoga Racetrack due to infield tunnel and redevelopment work at Belmont Park.

== Records ==
Speed record:

- 1:20.33 – You And I (1994)

Margins:

- 10 lengths – Jack Christopher (2022)

Most wins by a jockey:

- 3 – Jerry Bailey (1991, 1999, 2000)
- 3 – Mike E. Smith (1996, 1998, 2017)
- 3 – Edgar Prado (2005, 2006, 2010)
- 3 – Joel Rosario (2013, 2016, 2018)

Most wins by a trainer:

- 4 – D. Wayne Lukas (1987, 1989, 1995, 1999)

Most wins by an owner:

- 2 – Zayat Stables (2008, 2011)
- 2 – WinStar Farm & China Horse Club (2017, 2025)

== Winners ==
Year	Winner	Jockey	Trainer	Owner	Distance	Time	Purse	Grade	Ref
At Saratoga – Woody Stephens Stakes
2026	Englishman	Jose L. Ortiz	Cherie DeVaux	C R K Stable	7 furlongs	1:20.40	$500,000	I	
2025	Patch Adams	Luis Saez	Brad H. Cox	WinStar Farm & China Horse Club	7 furlongs	1:21:36	$500,000	I	
2024	Book'em Danno	Irad Ortiz Jr.	Derek Ryan	Atlantic Six Racing	7 furlongs	1:21.30	$500,000	I	
At Belmont Park
2023	Arabian Lion	John R. Velazquez	Bob Baffert	Zedan Racing Stables	7 furlongs	1:21.70	$400,000	I	
2022	Jack Christopher	José Ortiz	Chad C. Brown	Peter M. Brant, Gerry Isbister, Jim Bakke, & Coolmore Stud	7 furlongs	1:21.18	$392,000	I	
2021	Drain the Clock	Jose Ortiz	Saffie Joseph Jr	Slam Dunk Racing, Madaket Stables, Wonder Stables & Michael Nentwig	7 furlongs	1:22.27	$392,000	I	
2020	No Parole	Luis Saez	Thomas Amoss	Maggi Moss & Greg Tramontin	7 furlongs	1:21.41	$242,500	I	
2019	Hog Creek Hustle	Corey J. Lanerie	Vickie L. Foley	Something Special Racing	7 furlongs	1:21.12	$400,000	I	
2018	Still Having Fun	Joel Rosario	Timothy L. Keefe	Gary Barber, Wachtel Stable and Terp Racing LLC	7 furlongs	1:21.45	$400,000	II	
2017	American Anthem	Mike E. Smith	Bob Baffert	WinStar Farm, Head of Plains Partners, China Horse Club, SF Racing	7 furlongs	1:22.14	$500,000	II	
2016	Tom's Ready	Joel Rosario	Dallas Stewart	G M B Racing	7 furlongs	1:21.38	$500,000	II	
2015	March	Irad Ortiz Jr.	Chad C. Brown	Robert V. LaPenta	7 furlongs	1:21.37	$490,000	II	
2014	Bayern	Gary L. Stevens	Bob Baffert	Kaleem Shah	7 furlongs	1:20.75	$500,000	II	
2013	Forty Tales	Joel Rosario	Todd A. Pletcher	Perretti Racing Stable	7 furlongs	1:22.47	$400,000	II	
2012	Trinniberg	Willie Martinez	Bisnath Parboo	Shivananda Racing	7 furlongs	1:22.26	$400,000	II	
2011	Justin Phillip	Ramon A. Dominguez	Steven M. Asmussen	Zayat Stables	7 furlongs	1:23.56	$245,000	II	
2010	D' Funnybone	Edgar S. Prado	Richard E. Dutrow Jr.	Paul Pompa Jr.	7 furlongs	1:22.64	$245,000	II	
2009	Munnings	John R. Velazquez	Todd A. Pletcher	Michael Tabor, Mrs. John Magnier, Derrick Smith	7 furlongs	1:20.63	$250,000	II	
2008	J Be K	Garrett K. Gomez	Steven M. Asmussen	Zayat Stables	7 furlongs	1:21.85	$250,000	II	
2007	Teuflesberg	Robby Albarado	Jamie Sanders	Jeff Singer, Jamie Sanders, Donnie Kelly & Gary Logsdon	7 furlongs	1:21.49	$247,166	II	
2006	Songster	Edgar S. Prado	Thomas Albertrani	Darley Stable	7 furlongs	1:21.45	$250,000	II	
Riva Ridge Stakes
2005	Lost in the Fog	Edgar S. Prado	Greg Gilchrist	Harry J. Aleo	7 furlongs	1:21.54	$170,000	II	
2004	Fire Slam	Pat Day	David M. Carroll	Stan Fulton	7 furlongs	1:20.94	$200,000	II	
2003	Posse	Corey J. Lanerie	Steven M. Asmussen	Heiligbrodt Racing Stable	7 furlongs	1:22.03	$200,000	II	
2002	Gygistar	Pat Day	Mark A. Hennig	Edward P. Evans	7 furlongs	1:22.61	$190,000	II	
2001	Put It Back	Noel A. Wynter	H. Allen Jerkens	Hobeau Farm	7 furlongs	1:21.76	$150,000	II	
2000	Trippi	Jerry D. Bailey	Todd A. Pletcher	Dogwood Stable	7 furlongs	1:23.68	$150,000	II	
1999	Yes It's True	Jerry D. Bailey	D. Wayne Lukas	Padua Stable	7 furlongs	1:22.35	$150,000	II	
1998	Coronado's Quest	Mike E. Smith	Claude R. McGaughey III	Stuart S. Janney III	7 furlongs	1:22.50	$136,750	II	
1997	Smoke Glacken	Craig Perret	Henry L. Carroll	William B. Roberts	7 furlongs	1:20.98	$110,100	III	
1996	Gold Fever	Mike E. Smith	Claude R. McGaughey III	Cynthia Phipps	7 furlongs	1:23.30	$112,700	III	
1995	Western Larla	Gary L. Stevens	D. Wayne Lukas	Fares Farm Inc.	7 furlongs	1:24.24	$111,600	III	
1994	You and I	Chris McCarron	Robert J. Frankel	Edmund A. Gann	7 furlongs	1:20.33	$111,800	III	
1993	Montbrook	Clarence Joseph Ladner III	Dean Gaudet	Israel Cohen	7 furlongs	1:23.34	$123,600	III	
1992	Superstrike (GB)	José A. Santos	Bruce L. Jackson	David R. Kruse	7 furlongs	1:22.41	$117,600	III	
1991	Fly So Free	Jerry D. Bailey	Flint S. Schulhofer	Thomas F. Valando	7 furlongs	1:23.13	$123,400	III	
1990	Adjudicating	Jacinto Vásquez	Claude R. McGaughey III	Ogden Phipps	7 furlongs	1:23.90	$113,400	III	
1989	Is It True	Chris Antley	D. Wayne Lukas	Eugene V. Klein	7 furlongs	1:22.29	$117,000	III	
1988	Evening Kris	Laffit Pincay Jr.	Philip A. Gleaves	Robert E. Brennan	7 furlongs	1:22.80	$115,000	III	
1987	Jazzing Around	José A. Santos	D. Wayne Lukas	D. Wayne Lukas	7 furlongs	1:22.40	$80,400	Listed	
1986	Ogygian	Walter Guerra	Jan H. Nerud	Tartan Farms	7 furlongs	1:23.40	$81,500		
1985	Ziggy's Boy	Ángel Cordero Jr.	Walter Kelley	John B. Singer	7 furlongs	1:22.20	$81,600		

== See also ==
- List of American and Canadian Graded races
