= Ogygian =

American-bred Thoroughbred racehorse (1983–2015)

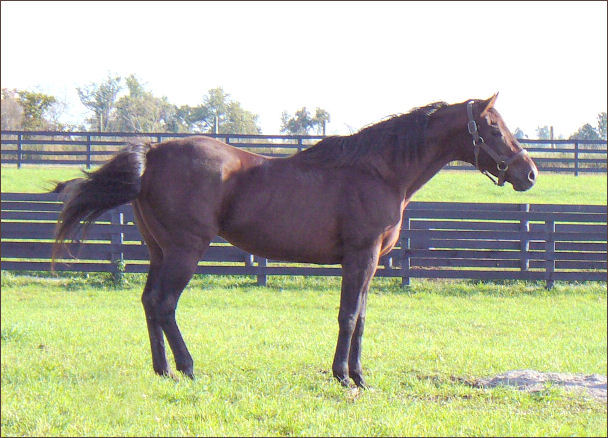
- Ogygian in retirement at Old Friends Equine in Georgetown, Kentucky
- Sire: Damascus
- Grandsire: Sword Dancer
- Dam: Gonfalon
- Damsire: Francis S.
- Sex: Stallion
- Foaled: 1983
- Country: United States
- Colour: Bay
- Breeder: Tartan Farms
- Owner: Tartan Stable
- Trainer: Jan H. Nerud
- Record: 10: 7–1–1
- Earnings: $455,520

Major wins
- Futurity Stakes (1985); Dwyer Stakes (1986); Jerome Handicap (1986); Riva Ridge Stakes (1986)

Ogygian (foaled March 17, 1983 – March 14, 2015) was a multiple Grade 1 stakes (G1) winning Thoroughbred race horse and an important broodmare sire.

== On the track ==
Bred by Tartan Farms, the muscular bay Ogygian left his mark on 1980s racing as the "swift but star-crossed" fastest son of Damascus. His dam, Gonfalon (by Francis S.), from the Cequillo female line, is also second dam (maternal grandmother) to millionaire Honour and Glory. Named after Ogygia, the island of the nymph Calypso in Homer's Odyssey, Ogygian was raced as a homebred by Tartan Farms. His trainer was Jan Nerud, son of John Nerud, who had trained Damascus' fiercest rival, Dr. Fager. Remembered as "the nation's fastest 2-year-old of 1985", Ogygian won the 1985 Belmont Futurity Stakes (G1) but a shin injury prematurely ended his two-year-old campaign. Back in training that December, he kicked the rail, receiving the injury that he was to battle through the rest of his race career. For the first time, bone chips were removed from his right hind ankle. Though the expected winter-book favorite for the 1986 Kentucky Derby, he did not heal in time to embark on the Triple Crown trail.

Ogygian began his three-year-old season with a second in an overnight handicap at Aqueduct, then followed this effort with wins in an allowance race and the Riva Ridge Stakes on Belmont day, 1986. Next, he won the Dwyer (G1) in front-running style over John's Treasure and Personal Flag, then stalked sprint-champion-to-be Groovy in the Jerome Handicap (G1) before running past him to win. Though Ogygian proved his merits at distances shorter than the classic mile-and-a quarter, his pedigree suggested classic distance ability. His sire, Damascus, had won the Belmont at a mile and a half and the Jockey Club Gold Cup, then two miles. His damsire, Francis S, won at classic distance in the Dwyer while that race was still run at a mile and a quarter. Nerud trained Ogygian toward the mile-and-a-quarter Travers Stakes (G1) but scratched him from that race due to a muddy track. Some sports columnists criticized his withdrawal from the race. Few were aware until later that throughout his three-year-old campaign, Ogygian battled chronic trouble from his ankle injury. After he finished third in the Pegasus Stakes (G2), seven more chips were discovered in the colt's ankle. He raced once as a four-year-old, for the first time in his life failing to place. Ogygian was retired in early May 1987. In all, Ogygian raced 10 times, with 7 wins (4 stakes wins, 3 Grade 1 wins), 1 second place (G2) and 1 third place (G2). Though two other sons of Damascus, Desert Wine and Highland Blade, earned more on the track, and Highland Blade equaled Ogygian's three Grade 1 wins, neither had the distinction of earning them in only ten races.

== At Stud ==
Retired in 1987, Ogygian stood at Claiborne Farm in Paris, Kentucky, until 1995, where he sired two dozen stakes winners, including Denim Yenem, D'hallevant, Dice Dancer, Digital Dan, Flyn J Bryan, and the speedy but ill-fated Ramblin Guy, among others. While at Claiborne, he lost his left eye in a breeding shed accident. Though a useful sire, he never replicated his own brilliance. In 1995, Ogygian went to East Stud in Japan, where he enjoyed success. His son Eishin Washington (out of a daughter of Sham) is a well-regarded stallion in Japan. In 2005, Ogygian was retired from breeding. Old Friends Equine returned him to the United States, and he resided at Dream Chase Farm in Georgetown, Kentucky.

== As a broodmare sire ==
While Ogygian's accomplishments on the track remain noteworthy two decades later, perhaps he will be best remembered as a broodmare sire. Among his daughters' foals are the 2001 Breeders' Cup Juvenile winner, Eclipse American Juvenile Champion and juvenile champion in Ireland, England and France, Johannesburg; multiple Grade 1 winning sprinter Street Boss; Grade 1 winning gelding Gygistar, who replicated Ogygian's Riva Ridge Stakes and Dwyer Stakes sequence; and multiple Grade 2 winner Friendly Island. While Johannesburg, is bred on a cross with Storm Cat (Northern Dancer sire line), more of Ogygian's stakes-level progeny seem to come from crosses with Raise A Native's descendants—and Johannesburg also carries Raise A Native ancestry. This strain was intensified in Johannesburg's son, leading sire Scat Daddy (2004-2015), who in turn sired 2018 Triple Crown winner Justify.

== Death ==
Ogygian was euthanized March 14, 2015, at Old Friends, due to complications from colic. He had become the facility's oldest living horse following the death of 32-year-old Clever Allemont on May 26, 2014.
