= Smarty Jones Stakes (Parx) =

- Class: Listed
- Location: Parx Casino and Racing; Bensalem, Pennsylvania, United States
- Inaugurated: 2010
- Race type: Thoroughbred - Flat racing
- Website: www.parxracing.com

Race information
- Distance: 1 1/16 miles
- Surface: Dirt
- Track: left-handed
- Qualification: Three years old
- Weight: 124 lbs. with allowances & 2 lbs added for stakes winners
- Purse: $200,000 (2024)
- Bonuses: First three finishers received automatic entry to Grade I Pennsylvania Derby

The Smarty Jones Stakes is a Listed American Thoroughbred horse race for three years olds, over a distance of one and one-sixteenth miles on the dirt track held annually in early September at Parx Casino and Racing racetrack in Bensalem, Pennsylvania. The event currently carries a purse of $200,000.

== History ==
The race was inaugurated in 2010 with an attractive purse offered of $300,000 as a preparatory race for the Grade I Pennsylvania Derby where the winner was given automatic entry.

The event is named in honor of the 2004 Kentucky Derby and Preakness Stakes winner, and hometown Pennsylvania hero Smarty Jones.

Originally the distance of the event was set as 1 mile and 70 yards but was extended in 2016 to the current distance of 1 1/16 miles.

In 2020 due to the COVID-19 pandemic in the United States, Parx Racing did not schedule the event.

In 2024 the event was downgraded by the Thoroughbred Owners and Breeders Association to Listed status.

== Records ==
Speed record:

- 1 1/16 miles – 1:42.27 - Pavel (2017)
- 1 mile and 70 yards – 1:40.89 - Wilburn (2011)

Margins:

- 7 lengths – Awesome Slew (2016)

Most wins by a jockey

- 2 – Paco Lopez: (2016, 2019)
- 2 – Joe Bravo: (2014, 2018)
- 2 – Florent Geroux: (2021, 2022)

Most wins by a trainer:

- 2 – Steven M. Asmussen: (2010, 2011)
- 2 – Brad H. Cox: (2021, 2022)
- 2 – Todd A. Pletcher: (2014, 2025)

Most wins by an owner

- No owner won this race more than once

== Winners ==
Year	Winner	Jockey	Trainer	Owner	Distance	Time	Purse	Grade	Ref
2025	Tip Top Thomas	John R. Velazquez	Todd A. Pletcher	James J. Bakke & Gerald Isbister	1 1/16 miles	1:42.50	$200,000	Listed	
2024	Gould's Gold	Emmanuel Esquivel	Kenneth G. McPeek	Four G Racing, Lance Gasaway & Magdalena Racing	1 1/16 miles	1:45.55	$200,000	Listed	
2023	Il Miracolo	Luis Saez	Antonio Sano	Eduardo Soto	1 1/16 miles	1:48.59	$300,000	III	
2022	Best Actor	Florent Geroux	Brad H. Cox	Gary West & Mary West	1 1/16 miles	1:44.14	$300,000	III	
2021	Fulsome	Florent Geroux	Brad H. Cox	Juddmonte	1 1/16 miles	1:45.57	$300,000	III	
2020	Race not held								
2019	Spun to Run	Paco Lopez	Juan Carlos Guerrero	Robert P. Donaldson	1 1/16 miles	1:44.14	$300,000	III	
2018	Axelrod	Joe Bravo	Michael W. McCarthy	Slam Dunk Racing	1 1/16 miles	1:45.34	$300,000	III	
2017	Pavel	Mario Gutierrez	Doug F. O'Neill	Reddam Racing	1 1/16 miles	1:42.27	$300,000	III	
2016	Awesome Slew	Paco Lopez	Edward Plesa Jr.	Live Oak Plantation	1 1/16 miles	1:42.92	$300,000	III	
2015	Island Town	Brian Hernandez Jr.	Ian R. Wilkes	Six Column Stables, Randell L. Bloch, John Seiler and David Hall	1 mile and 70 yards	1:44.10	$300,000	III	
2014	Protonico	Joe Bravo	Todd A. Pletcher	International Equities Holding	1 mile and 70 yards	1:41.17	$300,000	III	
2013	Edge of Reality	Stewart Elliott	Anthony W. Dutrow	The Elkstone Group	1 mile and 70 yards	1:42.20	$350,000	III	
2012	Easter Gift	Kendrick Carmouche	Nicholas P. Zito	Robert V. LaPenta	1 mile and 70 yards	1:42.05	$350,000	III	
2011	Wilburn	Corey Nakatani	Steven M. Asmussen	Stonestreet Stables	1 mile and 70 yards	1:40.89	$300,000	Listed	
2010	Thiskyhasnolimit	Jamie Theriot	Steven M. Asmussen	Mark Zollars, Bob Wagner, and Cathy Wagner	1 mile and 70 yards	1:40.49	$300,000	Listed	
