= Parx Casino and Racing =

Horse racing venue and casino in Pennsylvania, US

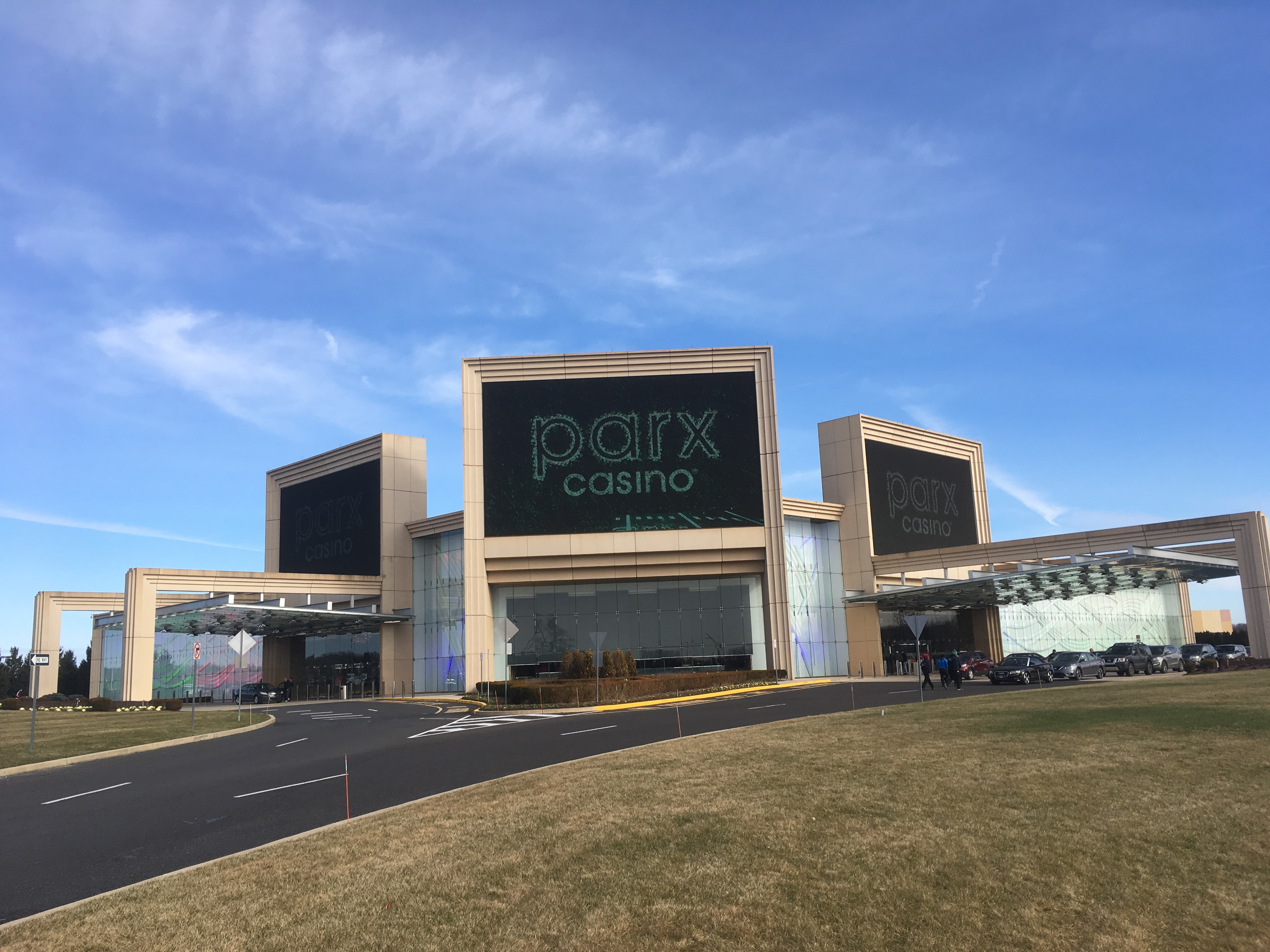

- Parx Casino & Racing in Pennsylvania Parx Casino and Racing (the United States)
- Interactive map of Parx Casino and Racing
- Location: Bensalem, Pennsylvania; 2999 Street Road Bensalem, PA 19020; 40.1186°N 74.9530°W
- Opened: Racetrack: November 4, 1974; Casino: December 18, 2009
- Gaming space: 150,000 square feet (14,000 m^{2})
- Signature attractions: Xcite Center
- Notable restaurants: Bambu Noodle House; Beer Garden; Chickie's & Pete's; Liberty Bell Gastropub; Oliveto; Parxgrill; Xlounge
- Casino type: Racino
- Owner: Greenwood Gaming and Entertainment, Inc.
- Previous names: Keystone Racetrack (1974–1984); Philadelphia Park (1984–2010)
- Website: Casino; Racetrack

Parx Casino and Racing (formerly Philadelphia Park Racetrack and Casino) is a Thoroughbred horse racing venue and the largest casino gaming complex in Pennsylvania. Parx is located in Bensalem Township in Bucks County, northeast of the city of Philadelphia. Owned and operated by Greenwood Gaming and Entertainment, Inc., Parx features 24-hour gaming with over 3,200 slot machines, 188 live table games, a poker room with 48 poker tables, live racing and simulcast action, sports betting, several dining options and bars, the Xcite Center, and a hotel called the Parxview Hotel. Parx also offers online gambling and online sports betting along with off-track betting at two locations.

== History ==
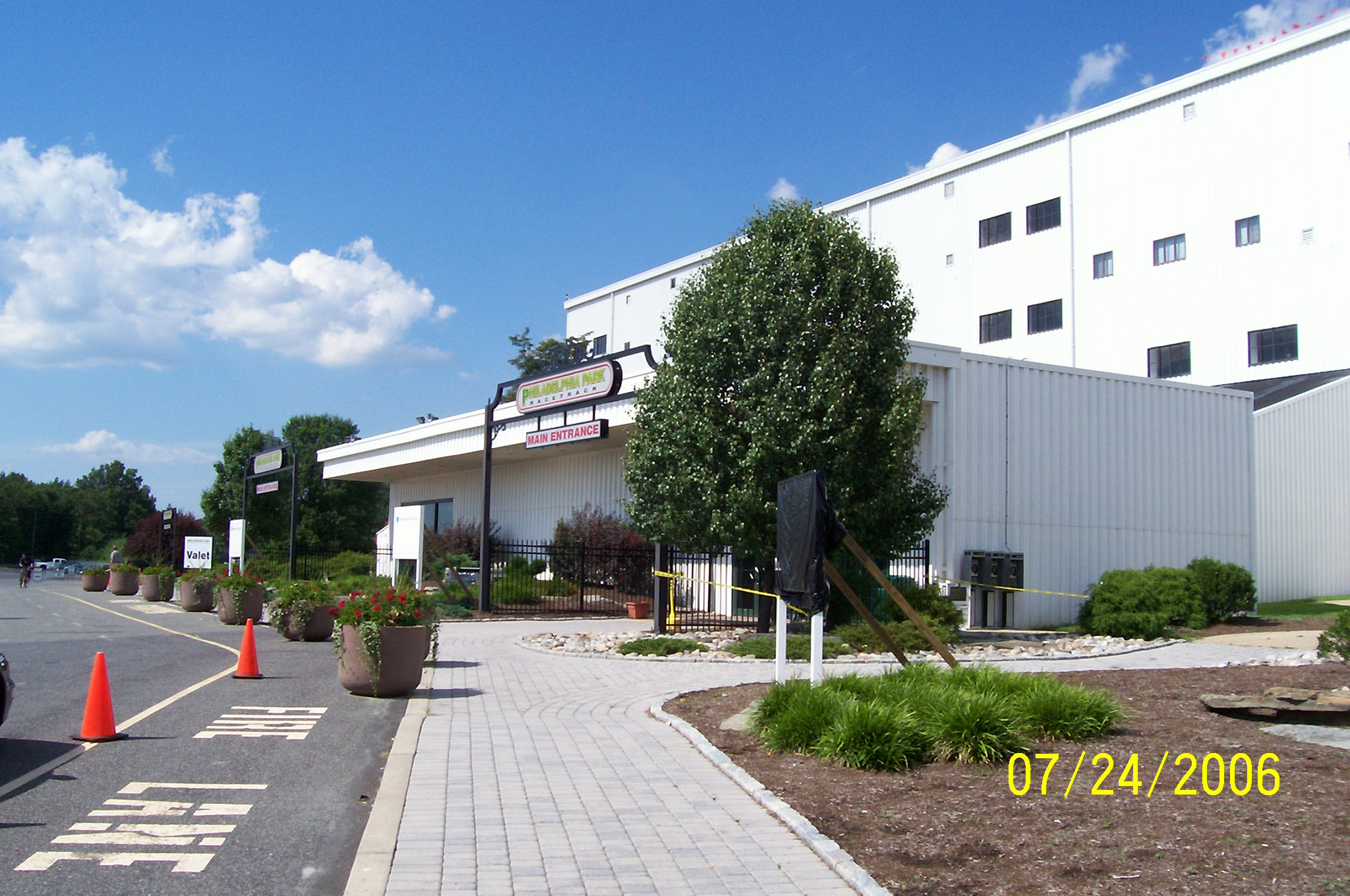
Philadelphia Park (now Parx East) July 2006

Originally called Keystone Racetrack, it opened in November 1974 in Bensalem, Pennsylvania, replacing the Liberty Bell Park Racetrack in Northeast Philadelphia as the area's Thoroughbred track. When the track was purchased in 1984 by ITB, the racetrack received a new name, Philadelphia Park, a new turf course, and an innovative new way to wager called Phonebet.

In December 1990, the racetrack again changed hands when Greenwood Racing, Inc., a corporation founded in 1989 by British bookmaking veterans Bob Green and Bill Hogwood, purchased the oval from ITB. Full card simulcasting was added, as well as six off-track locations called Turf Clubs, allowing race fans to watch and wager seven days a week.

Late in 1998, Greenwood joined with fellow Pennsylvania corporation, Penn National Gaming, Inc., in expanding into New Jersey with the purchase of Freehold Raceway in Freehold Borough and the operating lease of Garden State Park in Cherry Hill. The new partnership, called Pennwood, was expected to pursue off-track and account wagering in New Jersey. Garden State Park closed in 2002, and was razed shortly thereafter. Simulcasting on cable broadcasting systems (notably those owned by Comcast) was discontinued in March 2010, and shortly replaced by Comcast with TVG Network, who later joined with Harrah's Chester to bring their own simulcasting betting accounts in October 2010.

On August 30, 2010, the track was rechristened as Parx Racing and Casino.

Over the years, such notable horses as Shuvee, My Juliet, Spectacular Bid, Revidere, Summer Squall, and Broad Brush found their way to the winner's circle at Parx Racing and Casino. The track became famous as the original home of 2004 Kentucky Derby and Preakness Stakes champion Smarty Jones, who placed second in the Belmont Stakes, narrowly missing the Triple Crown.

In November 2014, it was revealed that Parx was requiring jockeys to sign a waiver as a condition of riding there. It is believed that the waiver stemmed from a court judgement against Parx in favor of the family of Mario Calderon, an exercise rider who suffered fatal injuries in an incident on the Parx backstretch in 2010. The judgement required Parx to pay Calderon's family $7.8 million in damages. The Jockeys' Guild said that the waiver contained language "inconsistent with the laws of Pennsylvania" and it would instruct its members against signing it.

In 2017, Parx hosted the fourth annual Jockeys and Jeans fundraiser for the Permanently Disabled Jockeys Fund. The fundraiser has raised more than $650,000 with the goal of raising $200,000 in 2017. The event was previously held in Tampa Bay Downs, Indiana Grand, and Gulfstream Park.

On March 19, 2018, a major accident occurred during the 9th race, in which hall of fame jockey Jose Flores was sent to a hospital following the incident. It was announced that he would be placed on life support a day later. The horse however had to undergo animal euthanasia. Flores was pronounced dead on March 22, 2018, at 12:42 pm.

Track announcers

- Keith Jones (1987–2020)
  - Third Longest Tenured Announcer In America
- Chris Griffin (2021–2022)
- Jessica Paquette (2022–Present)

== Pennsylvania Derby and Cotillion Handicap ==
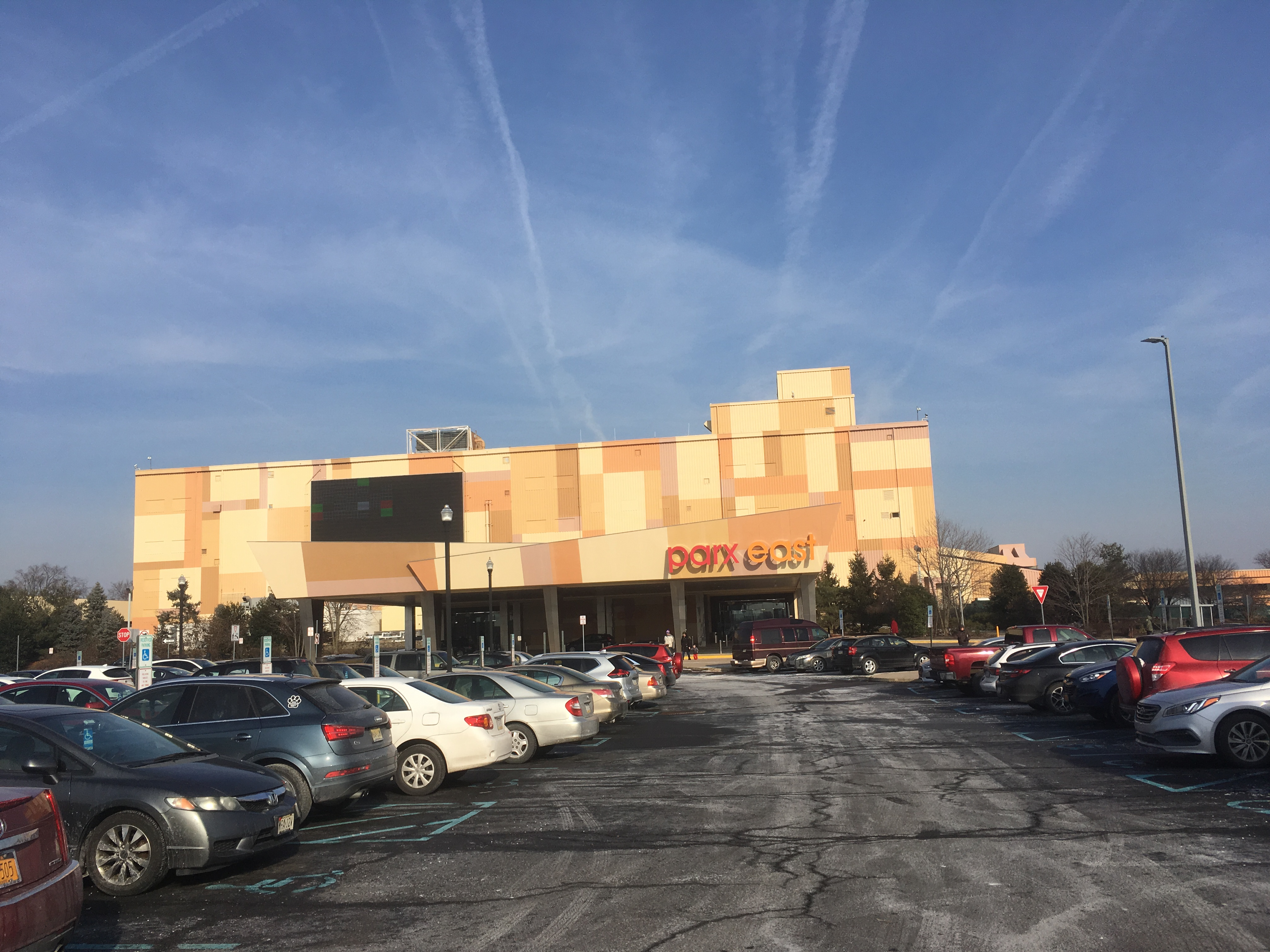
Parx East, located in the grandstand of the racetrack

Parx Racing and Casino is the home of Pennsylvania's two premier Thoroughbred races, the $1 million (as of 2019) Grade I Pennsylvania Derby and the $1 Million Grade I Cotillion Handicap. The Pennsylvania Derby (which first served as a Memorial Day replacement for the Jersey Derby after the original grandstand at Garden State Park was destroyed by a fire in 1977), was held on Labor Day until 2010 when the race was moved to the last Saturday in September. This brought it closer to the Breeders' Cup World Championships. The Pennsylvania Derby is a 1.125 miles (1.811 km) (nine furlongs) race for three-year-olds that has consistently attracted quality fields and large crowds. Over the past few years, it has evolved into a three-day festival that lasts all of Labor Day weekend at the racetrack, culminating with the running of the Derby. The festival has now become a month-long event that features the annual "Owners and Pennsylvania Day at the Races" the Saturday after Labor Day, and a new US$300,000 preliminary event on Labor Day named the "Smarty Jones." (This race was not run in 2006 because of the rebuilding of the main grandstand as a "racino".)

The Cotillion, which has been run since Thoroughbred racing began in Pennsylvania in 1969 at the old Liberty Bell Park in Northeast Philadelphia, is a 1.0625 miles (1.7099 km) (Eight and a half furlong) race. It is held (as of 2010) on the first Saturday in October as part of a fundraiser for the Susan G. Komen for the Cure breast cancer charity with races featuring female jockeys called "Parx Racing Ladies Day at the Races."

The main grandstand's lower floor was reconstructed back into a horse racing facility in September 2010.

The track's announcer was Keith Jones. Mr. Jones began his announcing career at Garden State Park as an assistant in the summer of 1985. He took over the full-time duties at Philadelphia Park in 1987. He also spent 13 years as the public address announcer for the Philadelphia Phantoms of the American Hockey League and has had the chance to call a handful of games for the parent club, the Philadelphia Flyers. In addition, Mr. Jones serves as host of the TV program, "Let's Go Racing," a 30-minute show featuring highlights of local racing and major, national stakes. He is a member of the track's Hall of Fame, inducted with the inaugural class in September 2011. Jones retired on December 30, 2020.

The Pennsylvania State Fair was held at the racetrack annually from 1987 to 2006. In 2002, the track hosted the Claiming Crown of horse racing.

The movie Safe, starring Jason Statham, filmed at Parx Racing and Casino.

== Casino ==
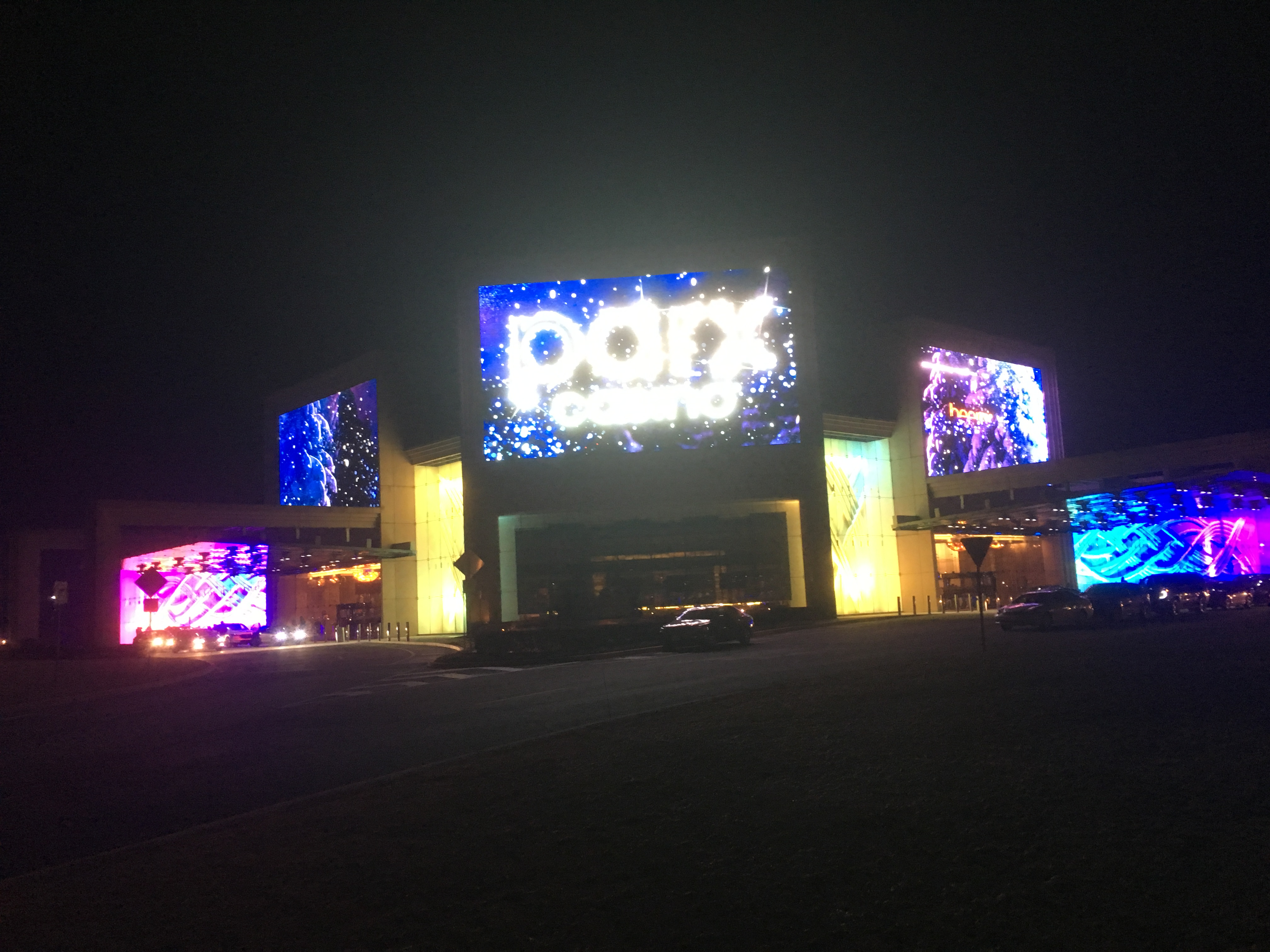
Parx Casino at night

On September 27, 2006, the racetrack was awarded a conditional slots license by the Pennsylvania Gaming Control Board, allowing construction to begin on the casino. Final approval of a permanent license came on December 20, 2006, and the following day the casino opened on in temporary space on the first and third floors of the racetrack. Bally's was chosen as the casino management system. The name of the casino - "Parx" - a modified spelling of the racetrack name - was unveiled following a fireworks display on July 4, 2009.

The plan for the 430-acre (170 ha) site:

- Phase 1: Renovation of the Grandstand, building of the Parx Casino. (Complete; opened December 18, 2009)
- Last Phase: Renovation of paddock. (Complete; opened in May 2010)

Parx has over 3,200 slot machines. Electronic table games, such as roulette and blackjack, and video poker are also available. On December 18, 2009, the casino building opened, with 3,300 slot machines. On July 18, 2010, the casino began operating table games. Parx has 188 tables, offering games including blackjack, craps, roulette, and baccarat.

Parx East, featuring card games, held its ribbon cutting ceremony on December 22, 2010. Parx East became the new name of the grandstand with gambling returning to that building. Gaming was now divided between two buildings on the Parx complex.

In January 2018, the Xcite Center and adjacent brand new poker room featuring over 48 tables opened in the main casino building as part of a $50 million expansion; poker was previously in the Parx East building. The poker room opened on January 11, 2018, while the Xcite Center opened on January 13, 2018.

The Pennsylvania Gaming Control Board approved a sports betting license for Parx on October 3, 2018. On November 2, 2018, Parx announced plans for a $10 million project that constructed a sportsbook called Parx Sportsbook, with a planned opening date of 2019. In the meantime, the casino operated a temporary sportsbook in the space of the Club 360 bar. Sports betting at Parx began on January 8, 2019, with a soft opening; the formal grand opening occurred on January 10, 2019. The permanent 7,400-square-foot (690 m^{2}) sportsbook opened on August 8, 2019, which consists of a 156-foot (48 m) HD media wall that can show 36 games at once, 200 seats, a bar, 3 VIP areas, 6 teller windows, and 18 automated kiosks. Sports betting is available on multiple sports including NFL, NBA, MLB, NHL, college football, college basketball, golf, soccer, and MMA. Parx launched an online sports betting app on June 24, 2019.

On July 15, 2019, Parx conducted a soft launch for online gambling, with the full launch occurring on July 18, 2019, after a testing period. Online gambling offered by Parx consists of slot machines, table games, and online poker. On March 15, 2022, Parx launched the betPARX app for online gambling and online sports betting. The betPARX app is available in Pennsylvania, New Jersey, Maryland, Michigan, and Ohio.

Parx is planning to construct Parx Casino Hotel, a 13-story hotel with 300 rooms, two restaurants, a coffee shop, banquet hall, spa, and fitness center, adjacent to the casino. Plans for the hotel were approved by Bensalem Township Council on March 13, 2023. As of October 2023, construction on the Parx Casino Hotel is on hold. On June 24, 2024, Parx announced that it has purchased the Inn at Fox Chase, a 167-room hotel adjacent to the casino, which it plans to renovate and rebrand. The Parxview Hotel opened on March 26, 2026, with a ribbon-cutting ceremony held.

== Dining and entertainment ==
Parx Casino and Racing currently has the following dining and entertainment venues:

- Foodies
- BurgerVana
- Bambu Noodle House
- Parxgrill
- Liberty Bell Gastropub
- Oliveto
- Xlounge
- Chickie's & Pete's
- Club 360
- Jax
- Liberty Bell Beer Garden
- Paddock Grill (at Parx East)
- Circle Bar (at Parx East)

== Xcite Center ==
The Xcite Center is an event center at Parx that hosts concerts, entertainment performances, comedy acts, and boxing and MMA matches. All shows require audience members to be age 21 or older. The event center has an area of 30,000 square feet (2,800 m^{2}) and seats over 1,500 people. The Xcite Center opened on January 13, 2018, with a sold-out concert by Chicago.

== Physical attributes ==
The track has a 1 mile (1.6 km) dirt oval and a 7 furlong - .875 miles (1.408 km) - turf oval.

== Stakes races ==
The following stakes are run at Parx Racing and Casino :

Grade I

- Pennsylvania Derby (last Saturday in September)
- Cotillion Stakes (Run on Pennsylvania Derby Day)

Grade II

- Gallant Bob Stakes

Grade III

- Dr. James Penny Memorial Stakes (not scheduled in 2023)
- Greenwood Cup Stakes
- Turf Monster Stakes (not scheduled in 2025)

Other Stakes

- Ambassador of Luck Handicap
- Captain My Captain Handicap
- Devil's Honor Handicap
- Mr. Jenney Handicap
- Mrs. Penny Stakes
- Northern Fling Handicap
- Parx Dash Stakes
- Parx Dirt Mile Stakes
- Peppy Addy Stakes
- PTHA President's Cup
- Smarty Jones Stakes
- Turf Amazon Handicap
- My Juliet Stakes
- Jostle Stakes

Discontinued stakes

- Philadelphia Handicap

== Off-track betting ==
Parx Racing offers off-track betting at two locations, which offer betting on horse races from around the world along with sports betting. The South Philadelphia Race & Sportsbook is located in South Philadelphia near the South Philadelphia Sports Complex.

== Parx Casino Shippensburg ==
Parx Casino Shippensburg is a mini-casino located in Shippensburg in Cumberland County. The mini-casino is located at the site of a former Lowe's store. The 73,000-square-foot (6,800 m^{2}) casino has 500 slot machines, 48 electric table games, and the Liberty Bar and Grill. Parx Casino Shippensburg opened on January 26, 2023. A grand opening ceremony was held on February 3, 2023.

== See also ==
- List of casinos in Pennsylvania
- Pennsylvania Gaming Control Board
