= 2025 Road to the Kentucky Derby =

Thoroughbred horse racing series

The 2025 Road to the Kentucky Derby was a series of races in 2024–2025 through which horses qualified for the 2025 Kentucky Derby, which was held on May 3.

The field for the Derby was limited to 20 horses, with up to four 'also eligibles' in case of a late withdrawal from the field. There were three separate paths for horses to take to qualify for the Derby: the main Road consisting of races in North America, the Japan Road consisting of four races in Japan, and the Euro/MidEast road consisting of seven races in England, Ireland, United Arab Emirates and France. The top five finishers in the specified races received points, with higher points awarded in the major prep races in March and April. Earnings in non-restricted stakes races acted as a tie breaker.

For 2025, the main Road to the Kentucky Derby resembled the 2024 Road to the Kentucky Derby, consisting of 36 races, with 21 races for the Kentucky Derby Prep Season and 15 races for the Kentucky Derby Championship Season with the following changes: (Note: See the following list for details)

- The Virginia Derby, a new event introduced by Churchill Downs Inc, was held on March 15 at Colonial Downs on the dirt and has been added to the Championship Season
- The Listed Sunland Park Derby was moved from the Kentucky Derby Championship Season to the Kentucky Derby Prep Season
- The UAE Derby was moved from the main North American road and placed in the rebranded Euro/Mideast road
- The Cardinal Stakes was removed from the Euro/Mideast road

Also there was an adjustment of points in Championship Series races on the Road to the Kentucky Derby. A minimum of six horses was required for full points to be awarded. Reduced points were offered if fewer than six horses started. Three-fourth points were available when five horses started, and half points if four or fewer horses started.

== Standings ==
The following table shows the points earned in the eligible races for the main series. Entrants that have been nominated are ranked in the standings.

As of May 2, 2025

| Rank | Horse | Points | Earnings (Note: Earnings from non-restricted stakes prior to the running of the Kentucky Derby serve as a tie-breaker.) | Trainer | Owner | Ref |
|---|---|---|---|---|---|---|
| 1 | Burnham Square | 130 | $927,425 | Ian R. Wilkes | Whitham Thoroughbreds | |
| 2 | Sandman | 129 | $1,117,995 | Mark E. Casse | D. J. Stable, St. Elias Stable, West Point Thoroughbreds & CJ Stables | |
| 3 | Journalism (Note: On March 31, 2025 Derrick Smith, Mrs. John Magnier and Michael Tabor were added to the ownership list as lessees.) | 122.5 | $600,000 | Michael W. McCarthy | Bridlewood Farm, Don Alberto Stable, Eclipse Thoroughbred Partners, Elayne Stables 5, Robert V. LaPenta; as lessees Derrick Smith, Mrs. John Magnier and Michael Tabor | |
| 4–scratched (Note: Rodriguez drew into the starting field but was scratched after training when he was diagnosed with a small but slightly sensitive foot bruise that will need a few more days off".) | Rodriguez | 121.25 | $476,000 | Bob Baffert | SF Racing, Starlight Racing, Madaket Stables, Robert E. Masterson, Stonestreet Stables, Dianne Bashor, Determined Stables, Tom J. Ryan, Waves Edge Capital & Catherine Donovan | |
| 5 | Tiztastic | 119 | $1,395,800 | Steven M. Asmussen | Winchell Thoroughbreds, Derrick Smith, Mrs. John Magnier & Michael Tabor | |
| injured (Note: Tappan Street Out of KY Derby With Condylar Fracture) | Tappan Street | 110 | $619,400 | Brad H. Cox | China Horse Club, WinStar Farm & Cold Press Racing | |
| 6 | Sovereignty | 110 | $548,800 | William I. Mott | Godolphin | |
| 7 | Final Gambit | 100 | $446,400 | Brad H. Cox | Juddmonte Farms | |
| 8 | Coal Battle | 95 | $1,169,500 | Lonnie Briley | Norman Stables | |
| 9 | Chunk of Gold | 75 | $324,400 | Ethan West | Terry L. Stephens | |
| 10 | Citizen Bull | 71.25 | $1,436,000 | Bob Baffert | SF Racing, Starlight Racing, Madaket Stables, Robert E. Masterson, Stonestreet Stables, Dianne Bashor, Determined Stables, Tom J. Ryan, Waves Edge Capital & Catherine Donovan | |
| 11 | Owen Almighty (Note: Originally, connections of Owen Almight indicated that the horse would bypass the Kentucky Derby. However, after considerations that horse recovered well from the Blue Grass Stakes and would enter the Kentucky Derby.) | 65 | $430,935 | Brian A. Lynch | Flying Dutchmen | |
| 12 | East Avenue | 60 | $612,500 | Brendan P. Walsh | Godolphin | |
| 13 | Publisher | 60 | $355,000 | Steven M. Asmussen | Gus King & Estate of Brereton C. Jones | |
| 14 | American Promise | 55 | $335,000 | D. Wayne Lukas | BC Stables | |
| injured | Magnitude | 55 | $325,005 | Steven M. Asmussen | Winchell Thoroughbreds | |
| bypassing (Note: Connections of River Thames have indicated that the horse need to recover more from his run in the Blue Grass Stakes and will bypass the Kentucky Derby and will point to the Preakness) | River Thames (Note: After the Fountain of Youth Stakes, Pantofel Stable & Wachtel Stable were added to the ownership list) | 50 | $176,700 | Todd A. Pletcher | WinStar Farm, China Horse Club, Pantofel Stable & Wachtel Stable | |
| bypassing (Note: Connections of Flood Zone have indicated that the horse will bypass the Kentucky Derby after his poor performance in the UAE Derby) | Flood Zone | 50 | $174,993 | Brad H. Cox | Wathnan Racing | |
| 15 | Flying Mohawk | 50 | $156,800 | Whit Beckman | Two Eight Racing, Berry Family Racing & Kaleta Racing | |
| 16–scratched (Note: Grande drew into the starting field but was scratched after Regulatory veterinarians visited trainer Todd Pletcher's barn one day before the event and announced the scratching due to a cracked heel.) | Grande | 50 | $140,000 | Todd A. Pletcher | Repole Stable | |
| bypassing | Getaway Car | 46 | $578,000 | Bob Baffert | SF Racing, Starlight Racing, Madaket Stables, Robert E. Masterson, Stonestreet Stables, Dianne Bashor, Determined Stables, Tom J. Ryan, Waves Edge Capital & Catherine Donovan | |
| bypassing (Note: Trainer Bob Baffert of Madaket Road removed him for consideration to the Kentucky Derby and has entered him in the Pat Day Mile Stakes on the same day) | Madaket Road | 46 | $290,000 | Bob Baffert | SF Racing, Starlight Racing, Madaket Stables, Robert E. Masterson, Stonestreet Stables, Dianne Bashor, Determined Stables, Tom J. Ryan, Waves Edge Capital & Catherine Donovan | |
| bypassing (Note: Connections of Built decided to bypass the Kentucky Derby and has entered him in the Pat Day Mile Stakes on the same day) | Built | 45 | $180,000 | Wayne M. Catalano | Eclipse Thoroughbreds Partners | |
| 17 | Neoequos | 40 | $153,250 | Saffie Joseph Jr. | Ian Parsard, Shining Stables & Stefania Farms | |
| 18 | Render Judgment | 39 | $163,172 | Kenneth G. McPeek | Baccari Racing Stable, Dream Walkin Farms, MJM Racing & Rocket Ship Racing | |
| 19 | Luxor Cafe | Japan | $257,209 | Noriyuki Hori | Koichi Nishikawa | |
| 20 | Admire Daytona (JPN) | E/ME (Note: European/Middle East qualifier) | $599,044 | Yukihiro Kato | Junko Kondo | |
| bypassing (Note: Connections of Heart of Honor have indicated that the horse will bypass the Kentucky Derby and will prepare him for the Preakness Stakes and possibly the Belmont Stakes) | Heart of Honor (GB) | E/ME (Note: European/Middle East qualifier) | $281,558 | Jamie Osbourne | Jim & Claire Limited | |
| 21 | Baeza (Note: Baeza entered the Kentucky Derby field as an also eligible, but after the scratching of Rodriguez enters the Kentucky Derby as a starter) | 37.5 | $100,000 | John Shirreffs | C R K Stable & Grandview Estate | |
| bypassing | Chancer McPatrick | 35 | $565,625 | Chad C. Brown | Flanagan Racing | |
| bypassing | Captain Cook | 35 | $187,500 | Richard Dutrow Jr. | St. Elias Stable | |
| bypassing | John Hancock | 35 | $160,000 | Brad H. Cox | China Horse Club & WinStar Farm | |
| bypassing | Maximum Promise | 33 | $96,150 | Kenneth G. McPeek | Back Racing & Run for LaRoses | |
| bypassing | Poster | 31 | $194,700 | Eoin G. Harty | Godolphin | |
| bypassing | Barnes | 26.25 | $180,000 | Bob Baffert | Zedan Racing Stables | |
| bypassing | Omaha Omaha | 26 | $142,500 | Michael Gorham | Nathan J. Nelson, Gary T. Carlson and Shawn M. Sullivan | |
| bypassing | Speed King | 25 | $668,750 | Ron Moquett | Triton Thoroughbreds | |
| not nominated | Instant Replay | 25 | $217,000 | Brad H. Cox | Gary & Mary West | |
| bypassing | Sand Devil | 25 | $82,500 | Linda L. Rice | Chester Broman Sr. | |
| bypassing | Passion Rules | 25 | $75,000 | Brad H. Cox | Calumet Farm | |
| injured | Hill Road | 24 | $215,000 | Adrian Murray | Arno Racing | |
| bypassing | Gosger | 20 | $241,800 | Brenden P. Walsh | Harvey A. Clarke Racing Stables | |
| injured | Disco Time | 20 | $150,000 | Brad H. Cox | Juddmonte Farms | |
| bypassing | California Burrito | 20 | $109,208 | Tommy Drury Jr. | Aaron & Victoria Haberman | |
| not nominated | Westwood | 18.75 | $30,000 | John Shirreffs | C R K Stable | |
| bypassing | Gaming | 18 | $608,000 | Bob Baffert | Karl Watson, Michael E. Pegram & Paul Weitman | |
| bypassing | Admiral Dennis | 17 | $96,188 | Brad H. Cox | Albaugh Family Stables | |
| injured | Jonathan's Way | 15 | $213,530 | Philip Bauer | Rigney Racing | |
| bypassing | Cornucopian | 15 | $81,000 | Bob Baffert | SF Racing, Starlight Racing, Madaket Stables, Robert E. Masterson, Stonestreet Stables, Dianne Bashor, Determined Stables, Tom J. Ryan, Waves Edge Capital & Catherine Donovan | |
| not nominated | McAfee | 15 | $42,000 | Richard Dutrow Jr. | Black Type Thoroughbreds, Swinbank Stables, Judy B. Hicks & Scott C. Rice | |
| bypassing | Garamond | 15 | $36,000 | Chad C. Brown | Juddmonte Farms | |
| bypassing | Patch Adams | 14 | $71,500 | Brad H. Cox | China Horse Club & WinStar Farm | |
| bypassing | Giocoso | 13 | $55,345 | J. Keith Desormeaux | Rocker O Ranch | |
| deceased (Note: Ferocious was injured after running in the Holy Bull Stakes. However, he was not able to recover and succumbed to laminitis.) | Ferocious | 12 | $244,500 | Gustavo Delgado | JR Ranch, Ramiro Restrepo, High Step Racing & OGMA Investments | |
| bypassing | Studlydoright | 11 | $272,275 | John Robb | David R. Hughes | |
| bypassing | Bracket Buster | 11 | $83,820 | Victoria Oliver | BBN Racing | |
| injured | First Resort | 10 | $296,776 | Eoin G. Harty | Godolphin | |
| bypassing | Caldera | 10 | $134,360 | D. Wayne Lukas | MyRacehorse | |
| bypassing | Baby Max | 10 | $114,776 | Kelsey Danner | J S Stables | |
| not nominated | Brereton's Baytown | 10 | $85,250 | Paul McEntee | Baytown Partnerships & Trawitzki Thoroughbreds | |
| bypassing | Cyclone State | 10 | $82,500 | Chad Summers | Gold Square, George Messina & Michael Lee | |
| injured | Surfside Moon | 10 | $71,000 | James Lawrence II | Manor Stable & Mair Lee Stables | |
| bypassing | Disruptor | 10 | $27,600 | Todd A. Pletcher | Repole Stable, Spendthrift Farm, Big Easy Racing, Titletown Racing, Winners Win, Golconda Stable, Ali Goodrich & Mark Parkinson | |
| bypassing | Vassimo | 10 | $30,000 | Todd A. Pletcher | Team Penney Racing | |
| not nominated | My Mitole | 10 | $18,000 | Carlos Martin | Half Hollow Stable | |
| injured | Mo Quality | 9 | $63,750 | Christopher Davis | Walmac Farm | |
| bypassing | Mellencamp | 8.75 | $22,000 | Bob Baffert | SF Racing, Starlight Racing, Madaket Stables, Robert E. Masterson, Stonestreet Stables, Dianne Bashor, Determined Stables, Tom J. Ryan, Waves Edge Capital & Catherine Donovan | |
| bypassing | Touchy | 6 | $145,000 | Wesley A. Ward | Three Chimneys Farm | |
| bypassing | Innovator | 6 | $103,658 | D. Wayne Lukas | BC Stables | |
| bypassing | Dapper Moon | 6 | $46,238 | Dallas Stewart | Valene Farms | |
| bypassing | Praetor | 6 | $30,000 | Chad C. Brown | William H. Lawrence, CHP Racing & Gainesway Stable | |
| injured | Burning Glory | 6 | $24,500 | William I. Mott | Juddmonte Farms | |
| bypassing | Gate To Wire | 5 | $148,950 | Todd A. Pletcher | Donegal Racing | |
| bypassing | Tip Top Thomas | 5 | $100,000 | Todd A. Pletcher | James J. Bakke & Gerald Isbister | |
| injured | Aviator Gui | 5 | $59,000 | Chad C. Brown | Three Chimneys Farm | |
| bypassing | Brodeur | 5 | $10,500 | Mark E. Casse | D. J. Stable | |
| bypassing | Take Charge Tom | 4 | $200,500 | Robertino Diodoro | Randy Howg | |
| not nominated | Banks | 4 | $159,753 | Joe Sharp | Tom Lambro | |
| bypassing | Clock Tower | 4 | $111,438 | Wesley A. Ward | Mrs. Fitriani Hay | |
| bypassing | Golden Afternoon | 4 | $73,875 | Nicholas Vaccarezza | Pat & Eddie Greco, Scott Jaffe, Michael P. Cloonan & Vaccarezza Racing | |
| bypassing | Hypnus | 4 | $60,750 | Kenneth G. McPeek | Brookdale Racing | |
| bypassing | Camp Hale | 4 | $10,000 | Ian R. Wilkes | Whitham Thoroughbreds | |
| bypassing | Smooth Cruisein | 3.75 | $18,000 | Karen Headley | Matson Racing, Sandra L. Brown, Elise & Marsha Naify | |
| injured | Kale's Angel | 3 | $355,265 | Pete Miller | Tom Kagele & Ernest Marchosky | |
| bypassing | Mo Plex | 3 | $238,750 | Jeremiah C. Englehart | R and H Stable | |
| not nominated (Note: Originally, McKinzie Street was trained by Tim Yakteen, but was moved to Justin Evans in early 2025) | McKinzie Street | 3 | $112,000 | Justin Evans | Leslie A. & Pierre Jean Amestoy Jr. & Roger K. Beasley | |
| bypassing | Filoso | 3 | $59,875 | Chad Summers | Gold Square | |
| not nominated | Dominant Spirit | 3 | $48,000 | W. Bret Calhoun | Martin Racing Stable, Bob Gorsky, Circustown Racing Stables, D and B Racing & Luke Brown | |
| not nominated | Mesero | 3 | $31,200 | Dale L. Romans | CJ Thoroughbreds & Delia Nash | |
| injured | Tux | 3 | $30,000 | William I. Mott | LNJ Foxwoods | |
| not nominated | Ican | 3 | $25,500 | Richard Dutrow Jr. | FMQ Stables | |
| bypassing | Smoken Wicked | 2 | $200,450 | Dallas Stewart | Valene Farms | |
| bypassing | Bullard | 2 | $95,700 | Michael W. McCarthy | By Talla Racing, St. Elias Stables, Three Chimneys Farm & West Point Thoroughbreds | |
| bypassing | He's Not Joking | 2 | $86,259 | Josie Carroll | Gianni Di Scola | |
| bypassing | Monet's Magic | 2 | $73,500 | Ben Colebrook | Midway Racing | |
| bypassing | Bon Temps | 2 | $39,625 | D. Wayne Lukas | Calumet Farm | |
| bypassing | Itsmybirthday | 2 | $23,640 | Robertino Diodoro | Arnold Bennewith, Clayton & Rick Wiest | |
| injured | Very Bold | 2 | $21,000 | Eoin G. Harty | Calumet Farm | |
| bypassing (Note: Emerald Bay is ahead of Dr Ruben M in the standings due to higher stakes earned from non-restricted stakes) | Emerald Bay | 2 | $18,000 | Bob Baffert | Karl Watson, Michael E. Pegram & Paul Weitman | |
| not nominated | Dr Ruben M | 2 | $18,000 | Doug F. O'Neill | The Del Mar Group | |
| bypassing | Rank | 2 | $14,500 | Doug F. O'Neill | Calumet Farm | |
| bypassing | Uncle Jim | 2 | $10,000 | Linda L. Rice | Linda Rice | |
| not nominated | Valentines Candy | 2 | $4,000 | Jesus Mendoza | Dale Brewer | |
| not nominated | Jolly Samurai | 1 | $106,500 | Danny Pish | Jake Brown | |
| not nominated | Vekoma Rides | 1 | $20,000 | John C. Kimmel | Nedlaw Stable, Denholtz Stables, Dennis A. Drazin & Jerold L. Zaro | |
| not nominated | Keewaydin | 1 | $10,000 | Chad C. Brown | OXO Equine | |
| not nominated | Hot Property | 1 | $9,750 | Brad H. Cox | Gary & Mary West | |
| not nominated | Show of Force | 1 | $8,000 | Todd W. Fincher | Triple V Racing | |
| not nominated | Mansetti | 1 | $7,100 | Kevin Attard | Al & Bill Ulwelling | |
| not nominated | Chris's Revenge | 1 | $2,000 | Brittany Russell | Nice Guys Stables | |

Legend:
Qualified for the Derby
Also eligible
Scratched
Injured/Bypassing/Inactive/Not nominated

== Prep season ==
=== Initial prep events ===
Note: 1st=10 points; 2nd=5 points; 3rd=3 points; 4th=2 points; 5th=1 point (except the Breeders' Cup Juvenile: 1st=30 points; 2nd=15 points; 3rd=9 points; 4th=6 points; 5th=3 points)

The dates for most races shown below are based on the placement in the racing calendar from 2023/2024. Similarly, the purses shown below are based on the amounts from the previous year and will be updated when finalized.

| Race | Distance | Purse | Track | Date | 1st | 2nd | 3rd | 4th | 5th | Ref |
|---|---|---|---|---|---|---|---|---|---|---|
| Iroquois | 1 mile | $254,745 | Churchill Downs | Sep 14 2024 | Jonathan's Way | Owen Almighty | Giocoso | Mesero | Sandman | |
| Champagne | 1 mile | $500,000 | Aqueduct | Oct 5 2024 | Chancer McPatrick | Tip Top Thomas | Mo Plex | Smoken Wicked | Vekoma Rides | |
| American Pharoah | 1 1/16 miles | $301,000 | Santa Anita | Oct 5 2024 | Citizen Bull | Getaway Car | McKinzie Street | Emerald Bay | Show of Force | |
| Breeders' Futurity | 1 1/16 miles | $594,063 | Keeneland | Oct 5 2024 | East Avenue | Ferocious | Filoso | Dapper Moon | Mesero | |
| Street Sense | 1 1/16 miles | $197,500 | Churchill Downs | Oct 27 2024 | Sovereignty | Tiztastic | Sandman | Dapper Moon | Bracket Buster | |
| Breeders' Cup Juvenile | 1 1/16 miles | $2,000,000 | Del Mar | Nov 1 2024 | Citizen Bull | Gaming | Hill Road | Getaway Car | Ferocious | |
| Kentucky Jockey Club | 1 1/16 miles | $381,250 | Churchill Downs | Nov 30 2024 | First Resort | Jonathan's Way | Tiztastic | Dapper Moon | Render Judgment | |
| Remsen | 1 1/8 miles | $250,000 | Aqueduct | Dec 7 2024 | Poster | Aviator Gui | Tux | Studlydoright | Keewaydin | |
| Springboard Mile | 1 mile | $300,000 | Remington | Dec 13 2024 | Coal Battle | Speed King | Dominant Spirit | Dr Ruben M | Jolly Samurai | |
| Los Alamitos Futurity | 1 1/16 miles | $200,000 | Los Alamitos | Dec 14 2024 | Journalism | Getaway Car | Gaming | Rank | Mellencamp | |
| Gun Runner Stakes | 1 1/16 miles | $96,000 | Fair Grounds | Dec 21 2024 | Built | Magnitude | Render Judgment | Admiral Dennis | Chris's Revenge | |
| Smarty Jones | 1 mile | $250,000 | Oaklawn | Jan 4 2025 | Coal Battle | Mo Quality | Kale's Angel | Bon Temps | Hot Property | |
| Jerome | 1 mile | $150,000 | Aqueduct | Jan 4 2025 | Cyclone State | Omaha Omaha | Ican | Studlydoright | Mansetti | |

=== Select prep events ===
Note: 1st=20 points; 2nd=10 points; 3rd=6 points; 4th=4 points; 5th=2 points

| Race | Distance | Purse | Track | Date | 1st | 2nd | 3rd | 4th | 5th | Ref |
|---|---|---|---|---|---|---|---|---|---|---|
| Lecomte | 1 1/16 miles | $250,000 | Fair Grounds | Jan 18 2025 | Disco Time | Built | Innovator | Golden Afternoon | Maximum Promise | |
| Southwest | 1 1/16 miles | $1,000,000 | Oaklawn | Jan 25 2025 | Speed King | Sandman | Tiztastic | Patch Adams | Monet's Magic | |
| Holy Bull | 1 mile | $250,000 | Gulfstream | Feb 1 2025 | Burnham Square | Tappan Street | Burning Glory | Ferocious | He's Not Joking | |
| Robert B. Lewis | 1 mile | $200,000 | Santa Anita | Feb 1 2025 | Citizen Bull | Rodriguez | Madaket Road | Clock Tower | Valentines Candy | |
| Withers (Note: The Withers Stakes was downgraded from Grade III to Listed status in 2025) | 1 1/8 miles | $250,000 | Aqueduct | Feb 1 2025 | Captain Cook | Surfside Moon | Omaha Omaha | Mo Quality | Uncle Jim | |
| Sam F. Davis Stakes (Note: The Sam F. Davis Stakes was downgraded from Grade III to Listed status in 2025) | 1 1/16 miles | $200,000 | Tampa Bay | Feb 8 2025 | John Hancock | Owen Almighty | Poster | Camp Hale | Very Bold | |
| Sunland Park Derby (Note: The Sunland Park Derby was downgraded from Grade III to Listed status in 2025) | 1 1/16 miles | $400,000 | Sunland Park | Feb 16 2025 | Getaway Car | Caldera | Touchy | Take Charge Tom | Itsmybirthday | |
| John Battaglia Memorial Stakes | 1 1/16 miles | $173,000 | Turfway | Feb 22 2025 | California Burrito | Baby Max | Maximum Promise | Banks | Studlydoright | |

== Championship series events ==
=== First leg of series ===
Note: 1st=50 points; 2nd=25 points; 3rd=15 points; 4th=10 points; 5th=5 points
San Felipe Stakes: (Note: Since only 5 horses started in the San Felipe Stakes the qualification points offered is three-quarters) 1st=37.5 points; 2nd=18.75 points; 3rd=11.25 points; 4th=7.5 points; 5th=3.75 points

| Race | Distance | Purse | Grade | Track | Date | 1st | 2nd | 3rd | 4th | 5th | Ref |
|---|---|---|---|---|---|---|---|---|---|---|---|
| Risen Star | 1 1/8 miles | $500,000 | 2 | Fair Grounds | Feb 15 2025 | Magnitude | Chunk Of Gold | Built | Vassimo | American Promise | |
| Rebel (Note: Originally, the Rebel Stakes was scheduled to be held on Saturday, February 22, 2025, but was rescheduled to the following day due to the impending cold weather that was forecasted) | 1 1/16 miles | $1,250,000 | 2 | Oaklawn | Feb 23 2025 | Coal Battle | Madaket Road | Sandman | Publisher | Tiztastic | |
| Gotham | 1 mile | $300,000 | 3 | Aqueduct | Mar 1 2025 | Flood Zone | Sand Devil | Garamond | My Mitole | McAfee | |
| Fountain of Youth | 1 1/16 miles | $401,650 | 2 | Gulfstream | Mar 1 2025 | Sovereignty | River Thames | Neoequos | Burnham Square | Gate to Wire | |
| San Felipe | 1 1/16 miles | $300,000 | 2 | Santa Anita | Mar 1 2025 | Journalism | Barnes | Rodriguez | Mellencamp | Smooth Cruisein | |
| Tampa Bay Derby | 1 1/16 miles | $350,000 | 3 | Tampa Bay | Mar 8 2025 | Owen Almighty | Chancer McPatrick | Hill Road | Patch Adams | Brodeur | |
| Virginia Derby (Note: The inaugural running of the Virginia Derby as an ungraded Road to the Kentucky Derby event.) | 1 1/8 miles | $527,500 | | Colonial Downs | Mar 15 2025 | American Promise | Render Judgment | Omaha Omaha | Getaway Car | Studlydoright | |

=== Second leg of series ===
These races are the major preps for the Kentucky Derby, and are thus weighted more heavily.
Note: 1st=100 points; 2nd=50 points; 3rd=25 points; 4th=15 points; 5th=10 points
with the exception of the following events:
Santa Anita Derby: (Note: Since only 5 horses entered in the Santa Anita Derby the qualification points offered are three-quarters) 1st=75 points; 2nd=37.5 points; 3rd=18.75 points; 4th=11.25 points; 5th=7.5 points
Lexington Stakes; 1st=20 points; 2nd=10 points; 3rd=6 points; 4th=4 points; 5th=2 points

| Race | Distance | Purse | Grade | Track | Date | 1st | 2nd | 3rd | 4th | 5th | Ref |
|---|---|---|---|---|---|---|---|---|---|---|---|
| Louisiana Derby | 1 3/16 miles | $1,000,000 | 2 | Fair Grounds | Mar 22 | Tiztastic | Chunk Of Gold | Instant Replay | John Hancock | Built | |
| Jeff Ruby | 1 1/8 miles | $776,364 | 3 | Turfway | Mar 22 | Final Gambit | Flying Mohawk | Maximum Promise | Poster | Giocoso | |
| Florida Derby | 1 1/8 miles | $1,020,000 | 1 | Gulfstream | Mar 29 | Tappan Street | Sovereignty | Neoequos | Madaket Road | Disruptor | |
| Arkansas Derby | 1 1/8 miles | $1,500,000 | 1 | Oaklawn Park | Mar 29 | Sandman | Publisher | Coal Battle | Cornucopian | Brereton's Baytown | |
| Wood Memorial | 1 1/8 miles | $750,000 | 2 | Aqueduct | Apr 5 | Rodriguez | Grande | Passion Rules | Captain Cook | McAfee | |
| Santa Anita Derby | 1 1/8 miles | $500,000 | 1 | Santa Anita | Apr 5 | Journalism | Baeza | Westwood | Citizen Bull | Barnes | |
| Blue Grass Stakes | 1 1/8 miles | $1,250,000 | 1 | Keeneland | Apr 8 (Note: Due to the impending extreme weather conditions Keeneland moved the original scheduled racecard from April 5, 2025 to April 8, 2025) | Burnham Square | East Avenue | River Thames | Admiral Dennis | Render Judgment | |
| Lexington | 1 1/8 miles | $400,000 | 3 | Keeneland | Apr 12 | Gosger | Bracket Buster | Praetor | Hypnus | Bullard | |

== Euro/Mideast Road to the Kentucky Derby ==
The Euro/Mideast Road to the Kentucky Derby is designed on a similar basis to the Japan Road and is intended to provide a place in the Derby starting gate to the top finisher in the series. If the connections of that horse decline the invitation, their place is offered to the second-place finisher and so on. If neither of the top four accept, this place in the starting gate reverts to the horses on the main road to the Derby.

The series consists of seven races – four run on the turf in late 2024 when the horses are age two, plus two races run on a synthetic surface in early 2025 and the UAE Derby which has been moved to this rebranded Road to the Kentucky Derby for the first time.

| Race | Distance | Track | Date | 1st | 2nd | 3rd | 4th | 5th | Ref |
|---|---|---|---|---|---|---|---|---|---|
| Beresford Stakes | 1 mile | The Curragh | Sep 28 2024 | Hotazhell | Tennessee Stud | Windlord | Trinity College | Lambourn | |
| Royal Lodge Stakes | 1 mile | Newmarket | Sep 28 2024 | Wimbledon Hawkeye | Royal Playwright | Angelo Buonarroti | Puppet Master | Luther | |
| Prix Jean-Luc Lagardère | 1,400 metres (about 7 furlongs) | Longchamp | Oct 6 2024 | Camille Pissarro | Rashabar | Misunderstood | Field Of Gold | Henri Matisse | |
| William Hill Futurity Trophy | 1 mile | Doncaster | Oct 26 2024 | Hotazhell | Delacroix | Wimbledon Hawkeye | Seaplane | Anno Domini | |
| European Road to the Kentucky Derby; Conditions Stakes | 1 mile | Kempton Park | Feb 26 2025 | Opera Ballo | Hott Shott | Saddadd | Quai De Bethune | Molveno | |
| Patton Stakes | 1 mile | Dundalk | Mar 7 2025 | Titanium Emperor | Spicy Margarita | Mount Kilimanjaro | Powerful Lady | Glinka | |
| UAE Derby | 1,900 metres (about 1 3/16 miles) | Meydan | Apr 5 2025 | Admire Daytona | Heart of Honor | Don In The Mood | Shin Forever | ƒ Queen Azteca | |

Note:

- the four races in 2024 for two-year-olds: 1st=10 points; 2nd=5 points; 3rd=3 points; 4th=2 points; 5th=1 point
- the first two races in 2025: 1st=20 points; 2nd=10 points; 3rd=6 points; 4th=4 points; 5th=2 points
- The UAE Derby: 1st=100 points; 2nd=50 points; 3rd=25 points; 4th=15 points; 5th=10 points

ƒ Filly

Qualification Table

The top four horses (colored brown within the standings) are eligible to participate in the Kentucky Derby provided the horse is nominated.

| Rank | Horse | Points | Eligible Earnings | Trainer | Owner | Ref |
|---|---|---|---|---|---|---|
| 1 | Admire Daytona (Note: On March 31, 2025 connections of Admire Daytona paid the late nomination fee of $6,000 thus being eligible to start in the event) | 100 | $599,044 | Yukihiro Kato | Junko Kondo | |
| 2 | Heart of Honor (Note: On March 31, 2025 connections of Heart of Honor paid the late nomination fee of $6,000 thus being eligible to start in the event) | 50 | $281,558 | Jamie Osborne | Jim & Claire Limited | |
| not nominated | Don in the Mood | 25 | $132,315 | Teiichi Konno | Koichi Yamada | |
| not nominated | Hotazhell | 20 | $298,904 | Jessica Harrington | Silverton Hill Partnership | |
| not nominated | Opera Ballo | 20 | $0 | Charlie Appleby | Godolphin | |
| not nominated | Titanium Emperor | 20 | $0 | Adrian Murray | AMO Racing | |
| 3 | Shin Forever | 15 | $421,980 | Hideyuki Mori | Susumu Fujita | |
| not nominated | Wimbledon Hawkeye | 13 | $181,305 | James Owen | The Gredley Family | |
| not nominated | Camille Pissarro | 10 | $275,403 | Aidan O'Brien | Derrick Smith, Mrs. John Magnier, Michael Tabor & Peter M. Brant | |
| not nominated | ƒ Queen Azteca | 10 | $160,684 | Niels Petersen | Glaesner Racing APS | |
| not nominated | Hott Shott | 10 | $2,240 | Richard Hughes | P. Cook, P. Merritt & T. Verrier | |
| not nominated | Spicy Margarita | 10 | $0 | Adrian Murray | AMO Racing Limited & Giselle De Aguiar | |

Legend:
ƒ Filly
qualified
did not qualify

== Japan Road to the Kentucky Derby ==
The Japan Road to the Kentucky Derby is intended to provide a place in the Derby starting gate to the top finisher in the series. If the connections of that horse decline the invitation, their place is offered to the second-place finisher and so on through the top five finishers.

| Race | Distance | Track | Date | 1st | 2nd | 3rd | 4th | 5th | Ref |
|---|---|---|---|---|---|---|---|---|---|
| Cattleya Stakes | 1,600 metres (~1 mile) | Tokyo Racecourse | Nov 23 | Natural Rise | Clay King | T O Elvis | Snappy Dresser | Kanreiski | |
| Zen-Nippon Nisai Yushun | 1,600 metres (~1 mile) | Kawasaki Racecourse | Dec 11 | ƒ Myriad Love | Happy Man | Soldier Field | Natural Rise | Jugemoon | |
| Hyacinth | 1,600 metres (~1 mile) | Tokyo Racecourse | Feb 23 | Luxor Cafe | ƒ Promised Gene | Don in the Mood | Admire Daytona | Dragon | |
| Fukuryu | 1,800 metres (~1 1/8 miles) | Nakayama Racecourse | Mar 29 | Luxor Cafe | Meisho Zuiun | Golden Cloud | Levant Univers | Slazak | |

Note:

ƒ Filly
Cattleya Sho: 1st=10 points; 2nd=5 points; 3rd=3 points; 4th=2 points; 5th=1 point
Zen-Nippon Nisai Yushun: 1st=20 points; 2nd=10 points; 3rd=6 points; 4th=4 points; 5th=2 points
Hyacinth: 1st=30 points; 2nd=15 points; 3rd=9 points; 4th=6 points; 5th=3 points
Fukuryu: 1st=40 points; 2nd=20 points; 3rd=12 points; 4th=8 points; 5th=4 points

Qualification Table

The top four horses (colored brown within the standings) are eligible to participate in the Kentucky Derby provided the horse is nominated.

| Rank | Horse | Points | Trainer | Owner | Eligible Earnings | Ref |
|---|---|---|---|---|---|---|
| 1 | Luxor Cafe | 70 | Noriyuki Hori | Koichi Nishikawa | $257,209 | |
| not nominated | ƒ Myriad Love | 20 | Koichi Shintani | Shiraishi Asuka | $453,714 | |
| not nominated | Meisho Zuiun | 20 | Masaru Honda | Yoshio Matsumoto | $125,428 | |
| 2 | ƒ Promised Gene | 15 | Yuki Uehara | Silk Racing | $168,306 | |
| 3 | Natural Rise | 14 | Keizo Ito | Hiroyuki Yoshioka | $177,999 | |
| 4 | Golden Cloud | 12 | Shinya Kobayashi | Silk Racing | $80,906 | |
| 5 | Happy Man | 10 | Ryo Terashima | Shigehisa Tanabe | $345,430 | |
| not nominated | Don in the Mood | 9 | Teiichi Konno | Koichi Yamada | $128,028 | |

Legend:
ƒ Filly
qualified
did not qualify
