= Tappan Street =

Tappan Street may refer to:

- Tappan Street (horse), an American Thoroughbred race horse
- Tappan Street station, a light rail station in Brookline, Massachusetts, USA.
