= 2025 Kentucky Derby =

Horse race

151st Kentucky Derby
- Kentucky Derby
- Grade I stakes race
- Location: Churchill Downs; Louisville, Kentucky, United States
- Date: May 3, 2025
- Distance: 1 1/4 mi (10 furlongs; 2,012 m)
- Winning horse: Sovereignty
- Winning time: 2:02.31
- Final odds: 7-1
- Jockey: Junior Alvarado
- Trainer: Bill Mott
- Owner: Godolphin
- Conditions: Sloppy
- Surface: Dirt
- Attendance: 147,406

The 2025 Kentucky Derby (branded as the 151st Running of the Kentucky Derby presented by Woodford Reserve for sponsorship reasons) was the 151st running of the Kentucky Derby. It took place on May 3, 2025, at Churchill Downs in Louisville, Kentucky.

The 2025 Derby was won by Sovereignty, who entered the race off of a win in the Fountain of Youth Stakes and a second-place finish in the Florida Derby. Sovereignty was trained by Bill Mott, who won his second Derby—the first since he trained Country House, who was elevated to first place following the disqualification of Maximum Security in the 2019 Kentucky Derby. It was the first Derby victory for Venezuelan jockey Junior Alvarado, and the first win in the race for Sheikh Mohammed bin Rashid Al Maktoum's Godolphin racing. Godolphin won the Kentucky Oaks the previous day with Good Cheer, marking the first sweep by an owner of both the Oaks and Derby since Sol Kumin's Head of Plains Partners with Monomoy Girl and eventual Triple Crown champion Justify, respectively, in 2018. Godolphin is also the first sole ownership to win both races in the same year since 1952, when Calumet Farm won with Real Delight in the Oaks and Hill Gail in the Derby.

Despite poor weather conditions and a sloppy racing surface, Churchill Downs reported an attendance of 147,406 for the 2025 Derby. The all-sources betting handle on the Derby and the entire racing card set records of $234.4 million and $349 million, respectively. NBC Sports reported an average of 17.7 million viewers across NBC and Peacock for their 25th Kentucky Derby broadcast, the largest television audience for the race since 1989.

== Entries ==
The field was drawn on April 26 during the race meeting at Churchill Downs. A field of twenty was drawn to start with one also eligible being no. 21 Baeza. Journalism was installed as the morning line favorite at 3–1 as he drew post no. 8 for the derby. Sovereignty was installed as the 5–1 second choice out of post no. 18. Sandman drew post 17 at odds of 6–1. Burnham Square drew post no. 9 for the derby at odds of 12–1.

On May 1, the connections of Rodriguez announced that their horse would be scratched from the Kentucky Derby. Co-owner Tom Ryan announced in a post on X that the Wood Memorial winner had "a small but slightly sensitive foot bruise" and that he would be withdrawn from the race "out of an abundance of caution." The defection allowed Baeza, runner-up to Journalism in the Santa Anita Derby, to draw in to the race. With Flavien Prat named as the primary jockey for Baeza, Luis Saez picked up the mount on Neoequos.

On May 2, veterinarians with the Kentucky Horse Racing and Gaming Corporation scratched Wood Memorial runner-up Grande due to a cracked heel. Owner Mike Repole expressed his displeasure at the decision in a social media post on X. While stating that Grande was recovering from a slight cracked heel during the week, Repole said that follow up X-rays and PET scans on the horse were clean. He added that the team was "baffled and confused" as to the criteria used by the veterinarians to determine who scratches. In an interview with FanDuel TV later that day, Repole suggested that the decision to scratch Grande was made "24 hours too early." The scratch left trainer Todd Pletcher without a Kentucky Derby starter for the first time since 2003.

All 19 participants can be traced back through their lineage to 1973 Kentucky Derby winner and Triple Crown champion Secretariat.

== Results ==
The start of the Kentucky Derby saw some crowding among horses that broke closer to the rail after Citizen Bull bore out from his inside post position. Sovereignty, who broke from post 16, bobbled after the gate break as Chunk Of Gold came in on him slightly from post 17. As the field settled down going past the stands for the first time, Citizen Bull was ahead of Neoequos, Owen Almighty, American Promise and Japanese invader Admire Daytona. Sovereignty settled in along the rail and was running in 16th, 13 1/2 lengths behind Citizen Bull, as the 19 horses entered the backstretch. Journalism was ahead of Sovereignty in 10th place down the backstretch, and both he and Sovereignty made sustained bids as the field entered the final turn. Citizen Bull yielded the lead around the far turn, and Owen Almighty and Neoequos were briefly ahead at the top of the stretch before Sovereignty and Journalism passed them to their outside. Sovereignty and Journalism dueled together until inside the final furlong, when Sovereignty began to draw away. Sovereignty's final margin over Journalism was 1 1/2 lengths. Baeza, who drew in from the also eligible list, closed from 15th down the backstretch to finish third. Final Gambit, who ran last until the end of the backstretch, finished in fourth, and Owen Almighty held on to finish fifth.

Almost one week after the Derby was run, jockey Junior Alvarado was issued a $62,000 fine and a two-day suspension by Churchill Downs stewards for striking Sovereignty's hind quarters with the riding crop two times over the six-strike limit imposed by the Horseracing Integrity and Safety Authority. Alvarado has appealed the ruling.

Finish	Program Number	Horse	Qualifying Points	Trainer	Jockey	Morning Line Odds	Final Odds	Margin (Lengths)	Winnings
1	18	Sovereignty	110	William I. Mott	Junior Alvarado	5–1	7.98		$3,100,000
2	8	Journalism	122.5	Michael W. McCarthy	Umberto Rispoli	3–1	3.42	1 1/2	$1,000,000
3	21	Baeza	37.5	John Shirreffs	Flavien Prat	12–1	13.86	1 3/4	$500,000
4	3	Final Gambit	100	Brad H. Cox	Luan Machado	30–1	17.55	4 1/4	$250,000
5	20	Owen Almighty	65	Brian A. Lynch	Javier Castellano	30–1	40.27	9	$150,000
6	9	Burnham Square	130	Ian R. Wilkes	Brian Hernandez Jr.	12–1	19.65	10 1/2	
7	17	Sandman	129	Mark E. Casse	José Ortiz	6–1	5.77	12 1/2	
8	12	East Avenue	60	Brendan P. Walsh	Manuel Franco	20–1	41.97	13 1/4	
9	19	Chunk Of Gold	75	Ethan West	Jareth Loveberry	30–1	29.06	15 3/4	
10	14	Tiztastic	119	Steven M. Asmussen	Joel Rosario	20–1	24.80	16 1/2	
11	16	Coal Battle	95	Lonnie Briley	Juan Vargas	30–1	28.40	17	
12	7	Luxor Cafe	70	Noriyuki Hori	João Moreira	30–1	8.24	18 3/4	
13	2	Neoequos	40	Saffie Joseph Jr.	Luis Saez (Note: Flavien Prat was originally listed as the jockey of #2 Neoequos and #21 Baeza. Prat elected to ride Baeza, which was listed as his first preference.)	30–1	42.58	27	
14	13	Publisher	60	Steven M. Asmussen	Irad Ortiz Jr.	20–1	33.39	32 1/4	
15	1	Citizen Bull	71.25	Bob Baffert	Martin Garcia	20–1	13.98	33 1/2	
16	5	American Promise	55	D. Wayne Lukas	Nik Juarez	30–1	12.51	38 1/2	
17	15	Render Judgment	39	Kenneth G. McPeek	Julien Leparoux	30–1	20.57	39 3/4	
18	11	Flying Mohawk	50	Whit Beckman	Joseph Ramos	30–1	28.39	42 1/4	
19	6	Admire Daytona (JPN)	100	Yukihiro Kato	Christophe Lemaire	30–1	42.85	54 3/4	
scratched	~~4~~	~~Rodriguez~~	~~121.25~~	~~Bob Baffert~~	~~Mike E. Smith~~	~~12–1~~			
scratched	~~10~~	~~Grande~~	~~50~~	~~Todd A. Pletcher~~	~~John R. Velazquez~~	~~20–1~~			

Track condition: sloppy (sealed)

Times: 1/4 mile – 22.81; 1/2 mile – 46.23; 3/4 mile – 1:10.78; mile – 1:36.84; final – 2:02.31.
Splits for each quarter-mile: (22.81) (23.42) (24.55) (26.06) (25.47)

Note:

Source: Equibase chart

=== Payouts ===
The table below provides the Kentucky Derby payout schedule for a $2 stake.

Program number	Horse name	Win	Place	Show
18	Sovereignty	$17.96	$7.50	$5.58
8	Journalism		$4.94	$3.70
21	Baeza			$8.38

- $2 Exacta (18–8): $48.32
- $0.50 Trifecta (18–8–21): $115.56
- $1 Superfecta (18–8–21–3): $1,682.27
- $1 Super High Five (18–8–21–3–20): $38,405.96
