= Louisville Stakes =

- Class: Grade IIIT
- Location: Churchill Downs; Louisville, Kentucky, United States
- Inaugurated: 1895
- Race type: Thoroughbred – Flat racing
- Website: www.churchilldowns.com

Race information
- Distance: 1 1/2 miles (12 furlongs)
- Surface: Turf
- Track: Left-handed
- Qualification: Four-years-old and older
- Weight: 123 lbs with allowances
- Purse: $250,000 (2023)

The Louisville Stakes is Grade III American Thoroughbred horse race for horses age four years and older run over a distance of one and one half miles (12 furlongs) on the Turf scheduled annually in late May or early June at Churchill Downs in Louisville, Kentucky. The event offers a purse of $200,000.

== History ==
The event is named in honor of the city of Louisville where the Churchill Downs racetrack is located.

The event has a long and inconsistent history since its first running in 1895 as the Louisville Handicap. The inaugural event was held at a distance of 1 1/4 miles on the dirt on 15 May 1895 as the third event on a six race card attracting four runners which was won by the favorite Henry Young. The event was shortened for the next running in 1896 but was not held in 1897.

Between 1900 and 1906 the event was not held and when it was resumed in 1907 it was held at the shorter distance of six furlongs.

Between World War I and World War II the event was only held once in 1938 at the longer distance of 1 1/16 miles. In 1946 the event once again resumed in the late fall, initially as the Churchill Downs Special and then back to the original name in 1947 at the distance of 1 1/8 miles. After being idle between 1953 and 1956, the event was rescheduled back to the spring at the shorter distance of 1 1/16 miles.

In 1987 the event was carded for the turf course for the first time at a distance of one mile. The distance has been increased three times with current distance set in 2007. The event was run in divisions in 1991.

The event was classified as a Grade III in 2002 and has held that grading since.

Six fillies or mares have won this event with Keertana the only mare to win this race at the current distance.

Since its inauguration in 1895, two horses have won this race three times, both accomplishing the rare feet in consecutive years.

== Records ==
Speed record

- 1 1/2 miles: 2:26.70 – Utah Beach (2025)
- 1 3/8 miles: 2:14.09 – Kim Loves Bucky (2013)
- 1 1/8 miles: 1:47.69 – Lotus Pool (1992)

Margins

- 8 lengths – Tiger Rebel (1946)

Most wins

- 3 – Silverfoot (2004, 2005, 2006)
- 3 – Chorwon (1997, 1998, 1999)

Most wins by an owner

- 7 – Mrs. Joe (Dorothy Dorsett) Brown (1959, 1966, 1967, 1968, 1969, 1972, 1974)

Most wins by a jockey

- 4 – Robby Albarado (2002, 2004, 2005, 2008)
- 4 – Larry Melancon (1977, 1978, 1989, 1994)
- 4 – Jimmy Combest (1959, 1967, 1968, 1969)
- 4 – Steve Brooks (1946, 1947, 1948, 1952)

Most wins by a trainer

- 6 – Alcee Richard (1959, 1966, 1967, 1968, 1969, 1972)

== Winners ==
| Year | Winner | Age | Jockey | Trainer | Owner | Distance | Time | Purse | Grade | Ref |
|---|---|---|---|---|---|---|---|---|---|---|
Louisville Stakes
| 2026 | Burnham Square | 4 | Brian J. Hernandez Jr. | Ian R. Wilkes | Whithams Thoroughbreds | 1 1/2 miles | 2:26.80 | $235,000 | III | |
| 2025 | Utah Beach | 5 | Vincent Cheminaud | Ignacio Correas IV | Jeffrey S. Amling & Merriebelle Stable | 1 1/2 miles | 2:26.70 | $250,000 | III | |
| 2024 | Sugoi | 7 | Julien Leparoux | Conor Murphy | Paradise Farms & David Staudacher | 1 1/2 miles | 2:30.37 | $241,250 | III | |
| 2023 | Foreign Relations | 5 | Declan Cannon | Conor Murphy | Double O Racing | 1 1/2 miles | 2:32.47 | $222,300 | III | |
| 2022 | Cellist | 4 | Julien R. Leparoux | George R. Arnold II | Calumet Farm | 1 1/2 miles | 2:32.12 | $199,777 | III | |
| 2021 | Arklow | 7 | Florent Geroux | Brad H. Cox | Donegal Racing, Joseph Bulger & Estate of Peter Coneway | 1 1/2 miles | 2:27.13 | $150,000 | III | |
| 2020 | Admission Office | 5 | Julien R. Leparoux | Bryan Lynch | Amerman Racing (Jerry & Joan Amerman) | 1 1/2 miles | 2:27.25 | $100,000 | III | |
| 2019 | Tiz a Slam (CAN) | 4 | Steven Ronald Bahen | Roger L. Attfield | Chiefswood Stable | 1 1/2 miles | 2:27.48 | $100,000 | III | |
Louisville Handicap
| 2018 | Vettori Kin (BRZ) | 5 | Julien R. Leparoux | Kenneth G. McPeek | Fern Circle Stables, Old Friends, Stud TNT | 1 1/2 miles | 2:30.14 | $100,000 | III | |
| 2017 | Some in Tieme (BRZ) | 5 | Manoel R. Cruz | Kenneth G. McPeek | Some in Tieme, Inc. | 1 1/2 miles | 2:27.25 | $100,000 | III | |
| 2016 | Bullards Alley | 4 | Francisco C. Torres | Tim Glyshaw | Wayne Spalding & Faron McCubbins | 1 1/2 miles | 2:36.01 | $100,000 | III | |
| 2015 | Xtra Luck | 4 | Brian J. Hernandez Jr. | Neil J. Howard | Michele & Cliff Love | 1 1/2 miles | 2:28.24 | $100,000 | III | |
| 2014 | War Dancer | 4 | Alan Garcia | Kenneth G. McPeek | Diamond M Stable | 1 1/2 miles | 2:28.23 | $110,200 | III | |
| 2013 | Dark Cove | 6 | Rosie Napravnik | Michael J. Maker | Kenneth & Sarah Ramsey | 1 1/2 miles | 2:27.29 | $111,800 | III | |
| 2012 | Simmard | 7 | Gabriel Saez | Roger L. Attfield | Roger L. Attfield & Werner | 1 1/2 miles | 2:27.16 | $115,200 | III | |
| 2011 | ‡ Keertana | 5 | Jose Lezcano | Thomas F. Proctor | Barbara Hunter | 1 1/2 miles | 2:33.61 | $111,200 | III | |
| 2010 | Free Fighter | 5 | Francisco C. Torres | Chris M. Block | Thomas Fedro | 1 1/2 miles | 2:31.30 | $113,800 | III | |
| 2009 | Brass Hat | 8 | Calvin H. Borel | William B. Bradley | Fred F. Bradley | 1 1/2 miles | 2:28.44 | $111,800 | III | |
| 2008 | Lattice | 4 | Robby Albarado | Albert Stall Jr. | Claiborne Farm & Adele Dilschneider | 1 1/2 miles | 2:31.13 | $170,100 | III | |
| 2007 | Drilling for Oil | 4 | Kent J. Desormeaux | Kenneth G. McPeek | Bruce Lunsford & Lansdon B. Robbins III | 1 1/2 miles | 2:28.35 | $170,400 | III | |
| 2006 | Silverfoot | 6 | Mark Guidry | Dallas Stewart | Chrysalis Stables | 1 3/8 miles | 2:16.90 | $108,400 | III | |
| 2005 | Silverfoot | 5 | Robby Albarado | Dallas Stewart | Chrysalis Stables | 1 3/8 miles | 2:18.77 | $110,400 | III | |
| 2004 | Silverfoot | 4 | Robby Albarado | Dallas Stewart | Chrysalis Stables | 1 3/8 miles | 2:17.63 | $112,400 | III | |
| 2003 | Kim Loves Bucky | 6 | Shane Sellers | John Glenney | Kim & John Glenney | 1 3/8 miles | 2:14.09 | $112,000 | III | |
| 2002 | Pisces | 4 | Robby Albarado | Kenneth G. McPeek | Diamond C Stable | 1 3/8 miles | 2:15.82 | $115,500 | III | † Dead heat |
| 2002 | Classic Par | 4 | Donnie Meche | Merrill R. Scherer | Centaur Farms | 1 3/8 miles | 2:15.82 | $115,500 | III | † Dead heat |
| 2001 | With Anticipation | 6 | Jon Court | Jonathan E. Sheppard | Augustin Stable | 1 3/8 miles | 2:16.28 | $109,900 | Listed | |
| 2000 | Buff | 5 | Francisco C. Torres | Frank L. Brothers | Claiborne Farm & Adele Dilschneider | 1 3/8 miles | 2:14.31 | $115,700 | Listed | |
| 1999 | Chorwon | 6 | Calvin H. Borel | Hal R. Wiggins | Thomas C. Mueller | 1 3/8 miles | 2:14.15 | $112,600 | Listed | |
| 1998 | Chorwon | 5 | Pat Day | Hal R. Wiggins | Thomas C. Mueller | 1 3/8 miles | 2:17.10 | $109,500 | Listed | |
| 1997 | Chorwon | 4 | Calvin H. Borel | Hal R. Wiggins | Thomas C. Mueller | 1 3/8 miles | 2:19.45 | $109,600 | Listed | |
| 1996 | Nash Terrace (IRE) | 6 | Donna M. Barton | W. Elliott Walden | Frank Mansell | 1 3/8 miles | 2:18.82 | $110,400 | Listed | |
| 1995 | Lindon Lime | 5 | Craig Perret | W. Elliott Walden | Frank Mansell | 1 1/8 miles | 1:48.12 | $112,000 | Listed | |
| 1994 | L'Hermine (GB) | 5 | Larry Melancon | W. Elliott Walden | Four Fifths Stable | 1 1/8 miles | 1:48.36 | $108,500 | Listed | |
| 1993 | Stark South | 5 | Randy Romero | John W. Russell | Patricia Elia (Lessee) | 1 1/8 miles | 1:48.88 | $110,700 | Listed | |
| 1992 | Lotus Pool | 5 | Charles R. Woods Jr. | Burk Kessinger Jr. | Yoshiki Akazawa | 1 1/8 miles | 1:47.69 | $114,200 | Listed | |
| 1991 | Chenin Blanc | 5 | Julie Krone | William I. Mott | Bert Firestone | 1 1/8 miles | 1:51.59 | $84,800 | Listed | Division 1 |
| 1991 | Allijeba | 5 | Dean Kutz | Larry Robideaux Jr. | Robert Allenswort | 1 1/8 miles | 1:52.21 | $85,800 | Listed | Division 2 |
| 1990 | Silver Medallion | 4 | Patrick A. Johnson | Philip M. Hauswald | Brereton C. Jones | 1 1/8 miles | 1:50.40 | $112,500 | Listed | |
| 1989 | El Clipper | 5 | Larry Melancon | Gary G. Hartlage | Charles Nash, Marti Dozier & Gary Hartlage | 1 1/8 miles | 1:50.00 | $85,350 | Listed | |
| 1988 | First Patriot | 4 | Earlie Fires | John M. Gerbas Jr. | Kip Knelman & Steve Hayden | 1 1/8 miles | 1:51.80 | $84,150 | Listed | |
| 1987 | Icy Groom | 4 | Michael McDowell | Kelly Weir | William Fleming | 1 mile | 1:37.80 | $56,300 | Listed | |
Louisville Stakes
| 1986 | Ten Times Ten | 4 | K. Keith Allen | Carl Bowman | Leighton H. Dunham Jr. | 1 1/16 miles | 1:43.60 | $38,830 | | |
| 1985 | Big Pistol | 4 | Pat Day | Lynn S. Whiting | W. Cal Partee | 1 1/8 miles | 1:48.60 | $54,000 | | |
| 1984 | Le Cou Cou | 4 | Donald Lee Howard | James G. Arnett | Duane B. Clark | 1 1/8 miles | 1:50.80 | $53,650 | | |
| 1983 | Big Mav | 5 | Patrick A. Johnson | Gary W. Sanders | Kenneth Buckles | 1 1/8 miles | 1:53.80 | $54,450 | | |
| 1982 | Bobrobbery | 4 | Randy Romero | Thad D. Ackel | Flo-Dia Stable | 1 1/8 miles | 1:51.40 | $59,450 | | |
Louisville Handicap
| 1981 | Dreadnought | 4 | Tommy Meyers | James A. Padgett | Centurion Stable | 1 1/16 miles | 1:44.60 | $35,400 | | |
| 1980 | Dr. Riddick | 6 | Don Brumfield | Frank L. Brothers | Albert M. Stall Sr. | 1 1/16 miles | 1:44.00 | $32,750 | | |
| 1979 | Hot Words | 4 | James McKnight | Joseph M. Bollero | Russell L. Reineman Stable | 1 1/16 miles | 1:45.00 | $34,700 | | |
| 1978 | It's Freezing | 6 | Larry Melancon | Anthony Basile | Bwamazon Farm | 1 1/16 miles | 1:45.40 | $21,700 | | |
| 1977 | Amano | 4 | Larry Melancon | James A. Padgett | James Irvin | 1 1/16 miles | 1:43.80 | $22,125 | | |
| 1976 | § Ski Run | 4 | Garth Patterson | George T. Poole III | Cornelius V. Whitney | 1 1/16 miles | 1:44.00 | $21,850 | | |
| 1975 | Navajo | 5 | Jimmy Nichols | James Keefer | Joe Stevenson & Ray Stump | 1 1/16 miles | 1:43.20 | $22,250 | | |
| 1974 | List | 6 | Robert Breen | Forrest Kaelin | Dorothy D. Brown | 1 1/16 miles | 1:44.40 | $23,275 | | |
| 1973 | Knight Counter | 5 | Don Brumfield | Whitey Doleski | Brumfield & Huffman | 1 1/16 miles | 1:43.00 | $22,725 | | |
| 1972 | List | 5 | Jimmy Nichols | Alcee Richard | Dorothy D. Brown | 1 1/16 miles | 1:46.60 | $22,725 | | |
| 1971 | Great Mystery | 4 | Phil Grimm | Lynn S. Whiting | Dario Anthony Bacchiocchi | 1 1/16 miles | 1:44.80 | $21,800 | | |
| 1970 | Gallant Moment | 6 | David Kassen | Jack Long | Circle M Farm | 1 1/16 miles | 1:45.20 | $16,700 | | |
| 1969 | Tartan Man | 8 | Jimmy Combest | Alcee Richard | Dorothy D. Brown | 1 1/16 miles | 1:45.60 | $16,575 | | |
| 1968 | Cabildo | 5 | Jimmy Combest | Alcee Richard | Dorothy D. Brown | 1 1/16 miles | 1:47.80 | $16,350 | | |
| 1967 | Cabildo | 4 | Jimmy Combest | Alcee Richard | Dorothy D. Brown | 1 1/16 miles | 1:43.00 | $17,025 | | |
| 1966 | Tartan Man | 5 | Robert Gallimore | Alcee Richard | Dorothy D. Brown | 1 1/16 miles | 1:43.80 | $16,475 | | |
| 1965 | Big Brigade | 4 | Billy Phelps | Edgar Brumfield | Mr. & Mrs. S. F. R. Roberts | 1 1/16 miles | 1:43.80 | $16,375 | | |
| 1964 | Shoot Luke | 4 | Jimmy Nichols | Otis Clelland | Mrs. John Branhams | 1 1/16 miles | 1:44.20 | $16,375 | | |
| 1963 | Times Roman | 4 | Billy Phelps | Samuel B. Ott | Fourth Estate Stable | 1 1/16 miles | 1:44.20 | $10,975 | | |
| 1962 | Rev-Up | 4 | Jacinto Vásquez | Leslie G. Joffrion | Reverie Knoll Farm | 1 1/16 miles | 1:43.00 | $11,125 | | |
| 1961 | Little Fitz | 6 | Johnny Heckmann | James P. Watts | John C. Hauer Stable | 1 1/16 miles | 1:43.20 | $11,550 | | |
| 1960 | Little Fitz | 5 | William A. Peake | Robert C. Steele | John C. Hauer Stable | 1 1/16 miles | 1:42.40 | $11,275 | | |
| 1959 | Ekaba | 5 | Jimmy Combest | Alcee Richard | Dorothy D. Brown | 1 1/16 miles | 1:45.60 | $16,575 | | |
| 1958 | Cardinal Sin | 4 | Larry Grubb | Thomas H. Stevens Sr. | W. J. (Sonny) Sprow Jr. | 1 1/16 miles | 1:44.00 | $11,275 | | |
| 1957 | Munchausen | 4 | Lois C. Cook | E. C. Roth Jr. | Rothmore Farm | 1 1/16 miles | 1:44.00 | $11,625 | | |
| 1953–1956 | | Race not held | | | | | | | | |
| 1952 | Adams Off Ox | 4 | Steve Brooks | Howard Wells | Walmac Farm | 1 1/8 miles | 1:51.60 | $8,475 | | |
| 1951 | ‡ Our Request | 5 | Tommy Barrow | George White | E. W. Thomas & George White | 1 1/8 miles | 1:51.60 | $9,325 | | |
| 1950 | Mount Marcy | 5 | E. J. Knapp | Sylvester Veitch | Cornelius V. Whitney | 1 1/8 miles | 1:51.40 | $8,950 | | |
| 1949 | Inseparable | 4 | Robert L. Baird | Harry Trotsek | Hasty House Farm | 1 1/8 miles | 1:52.00 | $9,300 | | |
| 1948 | Shy Guy | 3 | Steve Brooks | Jack Hodgins | Dixiana | 1 1/8 miles | 1:51.20 | $12,600 | | |
| 1947 | Star Reward | 3 | Steve Brooks | Jack Hodgins | Dixiana | 1 1/8 miles | 1:52.40 | $28,350 | | |
Churchill Downs Special
| 1946 | Tiger Rebel | 4 | Steve Brooks | John M. Goode | Brent & Talbot | 1 1/8 miles | 1:52.80 | $30,200 | | |
| 1939–1945 | | Race not held | | | | | | | | |
Louisville Handicap
| 1938 | Arab's Arrow | 4 | Willie Lee Johnson | Gilbert Hardy | Louise Hickman | 1 1/16 miles | 1:46.40 | $3,000 | | |
| 1914–1937 | | Race not held | | | | | | | | |
| 1913 | Royal Tea | 4 | John Callahan | William Huntley Baker | Adair & Baker | 6 furlongs | 1:14.40 | $1,000 | | |
| 1912 | Granite | 4 | Johnny Loftus | W. O. Joplin | P. Hyams | 6 furlongs | 1:11.40 | $2,100 | | |
| 1911 | ‡ Ocean Bound | 4 | Ted Rice | French Brooks | Clay Brothers | 6 furlongs | 1:12.80 | $2,500 | | |
| 1910 | Ben Double | 6 | Carl Ganz | W. C. Westmoreland | F. J. Pons | 6 furlongs | 1:13.60 | $1,820 | | |
| 1909 | ‡ Crystal Maid | 3 | Stanley Page | Auval John Baker | R. K. Lewis | 6 furlongs | 1:14.20 | $1,850 | | |
| 1908 | ‡ Altuda | 4 | Sam Heidel | Peter W. Coyne | George J. Long | 6 furlongs | 1:12.20 | $2,140 | | |
| 1907 | ‡ Dainty Dame | 3 | Jimmie Lee | A. Lee Darnaby | J. W. Ferguson | 6 furlongs | 1:12.20 | $2,150 | | |
| 1900–1906 | | Race not held | | | | | | | | |
| 1899 | Bangle | 4 | Nash Turner | L. C. Davis | E. S. Gardner Jr. | 1 1/16 miles | 1:51.75 | $1,500 | | |
| 1898 | Estaca | 4 | Beauchamp | Pat Dunne | Pat Dunne | 1 1/16 miles | 1:52.50 | $1,500 | | |
| 1897 | Race not held | | | | | | | | | |
| 1896 | Loki | 3 | C. Reiff | E. T. McLean | W. McLean | 1 1/16 miles | 1:47.75 | $1,370 | | |
| 1895 | Henry Young | 3 | Alonzo Clayton | Unknown | Pastime Stable | 1 1/4 miles | 1:54.00 | $1,940 | | |

Legend:
Turf Dirt
Notes:
† In 2002, Two Point Two Mill won but was disqualified after an incident in the stretch and was set back to eighth place. The disqualification resulted in the declaration of Pisces and Classic Par as winners who had dead heated.
§ Ran as part of an entry
‡ Filly or Mare
