= European Road to the Kentucky Derby Conditions Stakes =

Flat horse race in Britain

Road to the Kentucky Derby
2022
Blue Trail	Harrow	Find

Previous years
2021
Highland Avenue	Sergeant Tibbs	Oo De Lally

2020-2018
2020
Chares	Berlin Tango	New World Tapestry
2019
Jahbath	Getchagetchagetcha	Target Zone
2018
Gronkowski	Court House	Fortune's Pearl

The European Road to the Kentucky Derby Conditions Stakes is a flat horse race in Great Britain open to three-year-old horses. It is run at Kempton Park over a distance of 1 mile (1,609 meters) and is scheduled to take place in February.

The race was first run in 2018 as part of the Road to the Kentucky Derby series through which horses earn points to qualify for a place in the Kentucky Derby. Prior to 2024 it was run in March.

== Winners ==
Year	Winner	Jockey	Trainer	Time	Reference
2018	Gronkowski	Jamie Spencer	Jeremy Noseda	1:37.74
2019	Jahbath	Jim Crowley	William Haggas	1:38.78
2020	Chares	J. F. Egan	Jane Chapple-Hyam	1:39.47
2021	Highland Avenue	Hollie Doyle	Charlie Appleby	1:38.12
2022	Blue Trail	James Doyle	Charlie Appleby	1:39.11
2023	Brave Emperor	Luke Morris	Archie Watson	1:39.76
2024	Notable Speech	William Buick	Charlie Appleby	1:39.23
2025	Opera Ballo	William Buick	Charlie Appleby	1:38.16
2026	Hidden Force	William Buick	Charlie Appleby	1:39.44

== See also ==
- Horse racing in Great Britain
- List of British flat horse races
- Cardinal Stakes
