= Road to the Kentucky Derby =

Points system by which horses qualify

The Road to the Kentucky Derby is a points system used to determine which horses qualify for a position in the starting gate for the Kentucky Derby. It features dozens of stakes races for 2 and 3-year-old Thoroughbreds – the number and specific races have changed slightly over the years. The points system replaced a previous qualifying system that looked at earnings from all graded stakes races worldwide.

There are 20 positions available in the starting gate for the Kentucky Derby. Starting in 2017, one of those spots is reserved for the winner of the separate Japan Road to the Kentucky Derby. If the winner of the Japan Road declines the offer, their position is offered to the next ranked Japanese horse. If none of the top four finishers accepts the offer, this position in the starting gate reverts to qualifiers on the regular Road to the Kentucky Derby. Starting in 2018, Churchill Downs developed a similar European Road to the Kentucky Derby.

The remaining 18 spots in the starting gate (or up to 20 if the European and Japanese offers are declined) are offered to the top finishers on the main Road to the Kentucky Derby. If one of those horses does not enter the Derby, their position is given to the next ranked horses on the list. Up to 24 horses may enter the race, with the bottom four point-earners listed as "also eligible". If any of the top 20 is scratched after entries are taken but before betting begins, the next ranked horse on the also eligible list will be eligible to run.

If two or more horses have the same number of points, the tiebreaker to get into the Kentucky Derby will be earnings in non-restricted stakes races, whether or not they are graded. In the event of a tie, those horses will divide equally the points they would have received jointly had one beaten the other. If an owner wants to run a filly in the Derby, she will have to earn points in the same races as the colts and geldings – points earned of the Road to the Kentucky Oaks are not transferable to the Derby.

== History ==
The Road to the Kentucky Derby point system was created in 2012 to establish a "clear, practical and understandable path" to the first leg of horse racing's Triple Crown, according to the official website of Churchill Downs. A poll conducted by Churchill Downs prior to the changes showed 83% of respondents did not understand how horses became starters for the Kentucky Derby. The previous system was based on earnings from all graded stakes races, which essentially gave equal weight to earnings from juvenile races, sprints and even races on the turf as to the traditional Derby prep races. The new system completely disregards sprint races, and places heavy weight on later races, thus putting a premium on recent results. The points system has changed the way horses are prepared for the Derby, the composition of the field and how the race itself is run given the absence of pure sprinters to ensure a fast early pace.

The series is divided into two phases, the Kentucky Derby Prep Season and the Kentucky Derby Championship Series. The prep season consists of early races on dirt or synthetic surfaces over distances of at least one mile that typically are run between late September and late February. Points are awarded to the top 4 finishers in each race on a 10-4-2-1 scale, except for the Breeders' Cup Juvenile, which has been awarded points on a 20-8-4-2 scale since 2016. The championship season consists of two legs and a "wild card" round. The first leg includes minor prep races, usually Grade II, with a 50-20-10-5 scale. The second leg consists of the Super Six Prep races, each worth 100 points to the winner. They include such historic races as the Florida Derby (G1) at Gulfstream Park, the Santa Anita Derby (G1) at Santa Anita Park, the Arkansas Derby (G1) at Oaklawn Park, the Louisiana Derby (G2) at Fair Ground Race Course, the Blue Grass Stakes (currently G2) at Keeneland Race Course and the Wood Memorial Stakes (currently G2) at Aqueduct Racetrack. There are two wild card races with points offered on a 20-8-4-2 basis.

The series originally consisted of 36 races in 2013 and has since changed over the years to include 46 races with the addition of the Japan Road to the Kentucky Derby (beginning in 2017) and European Road to the Kentucky Derby (beginning in 2018) series.

In addition to qualifying via the Road to the Kentucky Derby, various fees are required to start in the Derby: a nomination fee, an entry fee and a starter fee. For example, in 2013 horses born in 2010 were eligible and the nomination fee was $600 which was to be paid by January 26, 2013. If the January date was missed, a late nomination fee of $6,000 could be paid by March 23, 2013. In addition, owners with qualifying horses were required to pay $25,000 to enter the Derby by May 1, 2013, and an additional $25,000 to start. If a qualifying horse was not nominated in either January or March, it could be supplemented to the Derby for $200,000.

=== 2013 season ===
The 2013 season consisted of 36 races (19 races for the Kentucky Derby Prep Season and 17 races for the Kentucky Derby Championship Season).

=== 2014 season ===
The 2014 season consisted of 34 races (18 races for the Kentucky Derby Prep Season and 16 races for the Kentucky Derby Championship Season).

- Race changes: Added two races (Iroquois Stakes; Jerome Stakes) and removed four others (Royal Lodge Stakes; CashCall Futurity; Sam F. Davis Stakes; Derby Trial Stakes).
- Points system changes: Reduced the points for the wild card from 20–8–4–2 to 10–4–2–1.

=== 2015 season ===
The 2015 season consisted of 35 races (19 races for the Kentucky Derby Prep Season and 16 races for the Kentucky Derby Championship Season).

- Race changes: Added one race (Los Alamitos Futurity).

=== 2016 season ===
The 2016 season consisted of 35 races (19 races for the Kentucky Derby Prep Season and 16 races for the Kentucky Derby Championship Season).

- Points system changes: Increased the points for the Breeders' Cup Juvenile from 10–4–2–1 to 20–8–4–2.

=== 2017 season ===
The 2017 season consisted of 37 races (19 races for the Kentucky Derby Prep Season, 16 races for the Kentucky Derby Championship Season, and 2 races for the Japan Road to the Kentucky Derby).

- Race changes: Added one race (Sam F. Davis Stakes) and removed another (Grey Stakes).
- Rules changes: Added a separate Japan Road to the Kentucky Derby, which will consist of two races: the Cattleya Sho (points awarded: 40–16–8–4) for 2-year-olds in 2016 and the Hyacinth Stakes (points awarded: 50–20–10–5) to be run in early 2017. The winner of this series will be offered one of the 20 positions available in the Kentucky Derby starting gate. If the top finisher declines or is not able to participate in the Kentucky Derby, the second-place finisher will be offered a spot in the Kentucky Derby. If the second-place finisher declines or is unable to participate, then the third-place finisher will be offered a spot in the Kentucky Derby. No invitation will be offered for the Derby beyond the top three points earners.

=== 2018 season ===
The 2018 season consisted of 46 races (20 races for the Kentucky Derby Prep Season, 16 races for the Kentucky Derby Championship Season, 7 races for the European Road to the Kentucky Derby, and 3 races for the Japan Road to the Kentucky Derby).

- Race changes: Added one race (Springboard Mile) to the main series. Added one race to the Japan series (Zen-Nippon Nisai Yushun).
- Points system changes: Spiral Stakes moved to a "Wild Card" race, along with the Lexington Stakes. Points for these races will be awarded on 20-8-4-2 basis, which is a decrease for the Spiral and an increase for the Lexington. Japan Road to the Kentucky Derby races Hyacinth Stakes (30-12-6-3 basis) and Cattleya Sho (10-4-2-1 basis) had a reduction in points value from the previous season.
- Rules changes: European Road to the Kentucky Derby introduced on a similar basis to the Japan Road. Consists of seven races, four of them on turf and three on synthetic surfaces. Four races were run in Great Britain (Royal Lodge Stakes/Racing Post Trophy/Conditions Stakes/Burradon Stakes), two in Ireland (Beresford Stakes/Patton Stakes), and one in France (Prix Jean-Luc Lagardère).

=== 2019 season ===
The 2019 season consisted of 46 races (35 races in North America and Dubai on the main Road, 7 races for the European Road and 4 races for the Japan Road to the Kentucky Derby).

- Race changes: Added one race (Cardinal Stakes) to the European series and removed one other (Burradon Stakes). Added one race Fukuryu Stakes to the Japan series. Removed two races from the main series (Delta Jackpot Stakes and San Felipe Stakes).
- Points system changes: Japan Road: Fukuryu Stakes will be awarded on a 40-16-8-4 basis. Zen-Nippon Nisai Yushun points will be awarded on a 20-8-4-2 basis, which is an increase from the prior year. Due to the cancellation of the San Felipe Stakes, the Rebel Stakes points were allocated at seventy-five percent of original points value as it became a two-division race (points awarded on a 37.5-15-7.5-3.75 basis).

=== 2020 season ===
Originally, the 2020 season consisted of 46 races (35 races in North America and Dubai on the main Road, 7 races for the European Road and 4 races for the Japan Road), with only minor changes from 2019. However, the season was heavily disrupted by the COVID-19 pandemic, which caused the cancellation or rescheduling of most of the major prep races.

- Race changes: The San Felipe Stakes returned after a one-year break caused by investigations into Santa Anita Park equine fatalities during the 2019 season. The Risen Star Stakes split into two divisions and was awarded on a 50-20-10-5 points format for each division. The Sunland Derby, UAE Derby, Wood Memorial Stakes, and Lexington Stakes were cancelled for the main road and the Cardinal Stakes was suspended for the European road. The Arkansas Derby was rescheduled to May 2 and split into two divisions.
- Extended season changes: The Blue Grass Stakes and Santa Anita Derby were moved to an extended season due to the pandemic. Also, several races were added to the extended season including Pegasus Stakes, Indiana Derby, Los Alamitos Derby, and Ohio Derby awarded on a 20-8-4-2 points format, and Matt Winn Stakes, Ellis Park Derby, Shared Belief Stakes, and Peter Pan Stakes awarded on a 50-20-10-5 points format. Additionally, other high-profile races were added to the series including Haskell Invitational Stakes and Travers Stakes awarded on a 100-40-20-10 points format and Belmont Stakes awarded on a 150-60-30-15 points format. Furthermore, the Japan road added Unicorn Stakes and Japan Dirt Derby awarded on a 40-16-8-4 points format.

=== 2021 season ===
The 2021 road consisted of 36 races, 20 races for the Kentucky Derby Prep Season and 16 races for the Kentucky Derby Championship Season.

- Race changes: The race format reverted to the format utilized in 2019, except with the addition of the John Battaglia Memorial Stakes to the prep season to be awarded by a 10-4-2-1 points format.
- Points system changes: The Jeff Ruby Steaks was promoted to the championship season, with points awarded on a 100-40-20-10 format.
- Rules changes: Horses that run in Road to the Kentucky Derby races using the medication Furosemide will not qualify for earning points.

=== 2022 season ===
The 2022 road consisted of 37 races, 21 races for the Kentucky Derby Prep Season and 16 races for the Kentucky Derby Championship Season.

- Race changes: Added one race to the Kentucky Derby Prep Season with the addition of the Gun Runner Stakes.
- Rules changes: Points will not be awarded to any horse trained by any individual who is suspended from racing in the 2022 Kentucky Derby or any trainer directly or indirectly employed, supervised, or advised by a suspended trainer.

=== 2023 season ===
The 2023 road consisted of 37 races, 21 races for the Kentucky Derby Prep Season and 16 races for the Kentucky Derby Championship Season.

- Point system changes: Races will award points to the top five finishers. Previously, races were awarded points to the top four finishers. Most prep season races will award points changing from 10-4-2-1 to 10-4-3-2-1. Select prep season races will be increased from 10-4-2-1 to 20-8-6-4-2. These include Lecomte Stakes, Southwest Stakes, Withers Stakes, Holy Bull Stakes, Robert B. Lewis Stakes, Sam F. Davis Stakes and the John Battaglia Memorial Stakes. Points awarded in the Breeders' Cup Juvenile will be increased from 20-8-4-2 to 30-12-9-6-3. The first leg of the championship series races will award points changing from 50-20-10-5 to 50-20–15-10-5. The second leg of the championship series will award points changing from 100-40-20-10 to 100-40-30-20-10. The wild card race will award points changing from 20-8-4-2 to 20-8-6-4-2. Similarly, the Japan Road and European Road will follow the top five finisher format of the primary Road to the Kentucky Derby.

=== 2024 season ===
The 2024 road consisted of 36 races, 21 races for the Kentucky Derby Prep Season and 15 races for the Kentucky Derby Championship Season.

For 2024, the main Road to the Kentucky Derby resembled the 2023 Road to the Kentucky Derby, originally intended to consist of 37 races (revised down to 36 races with the cancellation of the Sham Stakes), with 22 races for the Kentucky Derby Prep Season and 15 races for the Kentucky Derby Championship Season with the following changes:

- Second-place points in all qualifying races have been increased to create added separation from second and third-place finishers
- Third- and fourth-place points in races that award 100 points to winner have been decreased from 100-40-30-20-10 to 100-50-25-15-10
- The Grade III Street Sense Stakes to be held on October 29 at Churchill Downs has been added to the Early Prep Season
- The El Camino Real Derby has been removed from the Early Prep Season
- The Sunland Derby at Sunland Park has been decreased in value from 50-20-15-10-5 to 20-10-6-4-2

=== 2025 season ===
The 2025 road consists of 36 races, 21 races for the Kentucky Derby Prep Season and 15 races for the Kentucky Derby Championship Season.

Race changes: The Virginia Derby will be added to the championship season with a points scale of 50-25-15-10-5.

Points changes: For races with a points scale of 100-50-25-15-10, 50-25-15-10-5, Sunland Derby, and Lexington Stakes, fewer points will be offered if the starting field is too small. If exactly five horses participate in these races, points will be allocated at 75% of the value. If four or fewer horses participate in these races, then points will be allocated at 50% of the value.

International road changes: There will be a Euro/Mideast Road to the Kentucky Derby which is rebranded from the European Road to the Kentucky Derby used in previous seasons. This series will consist of races from England, Ireland, France, and Unites Arab Emirates. The UAE Derby, which previously was part of the main road, has been moved to this series. The UAE Derby will retain the same points allocation as the previous season. The Cardinal Stakes has been removed from the Euro/Mideast road.

=== 2026 season ===
The 2026 road consists of 36 races, 21 races for the Kentucky Derby Prep Season and 15 races for the Kentucky Derby Championship Season.

== See also ==
- Breeders' Cup Challenge
- Road to the Kentucky Oaks
