= Cattleya Stakes =

Japanese horse race

Cattleya Stakes カトレアステークス
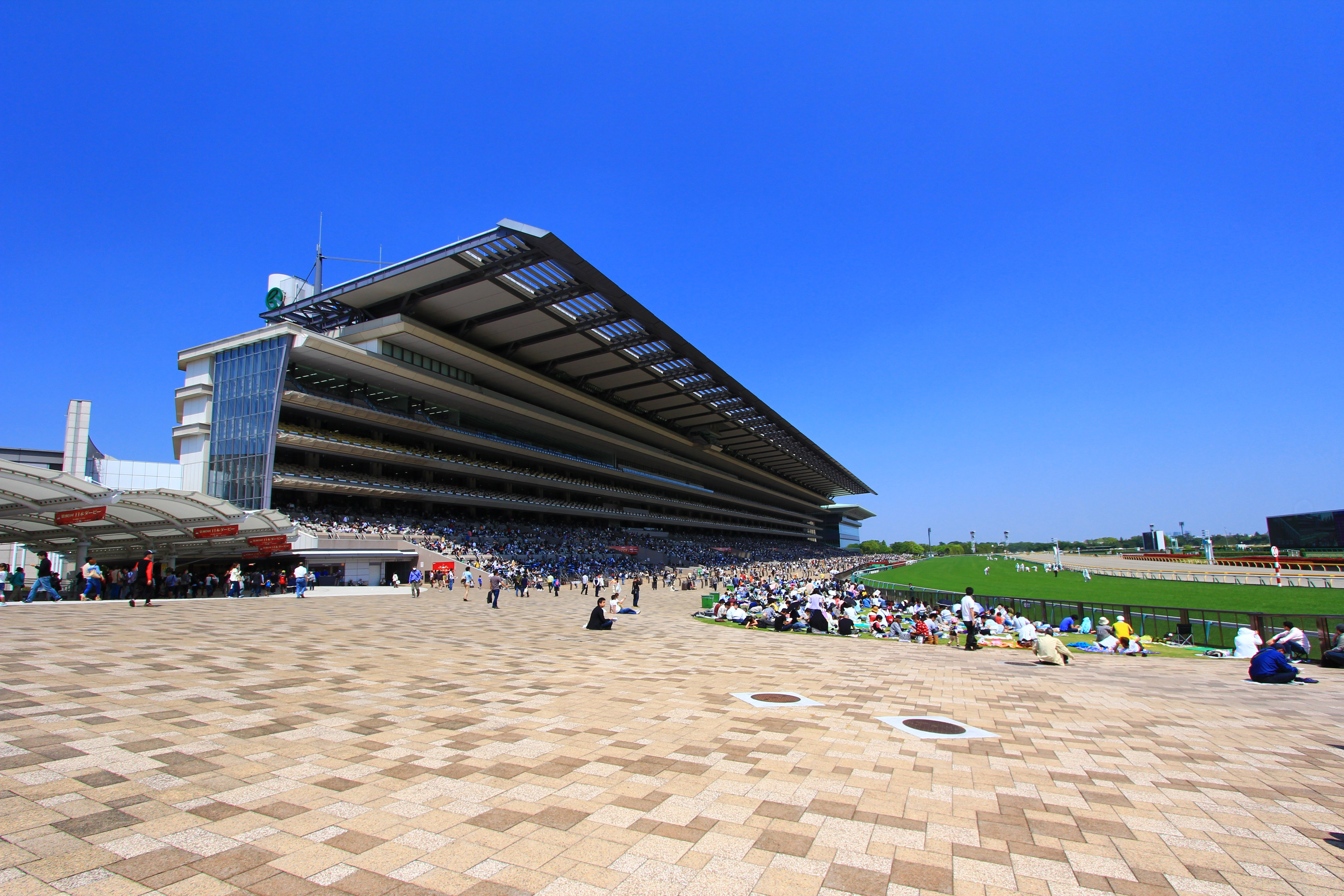
- Tokyo Racecourse
- Class: Open
- Location: Tokyo Racecourse, Fuchū, Tokyo, Japan
- Inaugurated: 1975
- Race type: Thoroughbred
- Website: japanracing.jp/

Race information
- Distance: 1,600 meters
- Surface: Dirt
- Track: Left-handed
- Qualification: 2-y-o Thoroughbreds
- Weight: 2-y-o 56 kg Allowance: Fillies 1 kg
- Purse: ¥ 34,560,000 (as of 2024): 1st: ¥ 16,000,000; 2nd: ¥ 6,400,000; 3rd: ¥ 4,000,000

The Cattleya Stakes is a flat horse race in Japan open to two-year-old horses. It is run at Tokyo Racecourse over a distance of 1,600 metres.

The race was first run as Cattleya Sho in 1975 and then discontinued from 2008 to 2014. The race was reintroduced in 2015. In 2016, the race began to be included as part of the Road to the Kentucky Derby series. It was renamed to Cattleya Stakes in 2020.

The inaugural race in 1975 was run at 1,600 metres. The next year it was run at 1,700 metres on turf, but was brought back to 1,600 meters on dirt the year after. It has since run at 1,600 metres except for 2003 when it was run at 1,800 metres at Nakayama Racecourse.

== Winners ==
Year	Winner	Jockey	Trainer	Owner	Time
2025	Satono Voyage	Keita Tosaki	Hiroyasu Tanaka	Hajime Satomi	1:37.4
2024	Natural Rise	Takeshi Yokoyama	Keizo Ito	Hiroyuki Yoshioka	1:36.4
2023	Amante Bianco	Christophe Lemaire	Keisuke Miyata	Silk Racing Co Ltd	1:37.5
2022	Continuar	Damian Lane	Yoshito Yahagi	Lion Race Horse Co Ltd	1:36.6
2021	Consigliere	Christophe Lemaire	Yukio Inagaki	Kazumi Yoshida	1:38.0
2020	Lemon Pop	Keita Tosaki	Hiroyasu Tanaka	Godolphin	1:36.4
2019	Dieu du Vin	Frankie Dettori	Yukihiro Kato	Three H Racing Co Ltd	1:36.2
2018	Make Happy	Christophe Lemaire	Koichi Shinkai	Kazuko Yoshida	1.38.3
2017	Ruggero	Keita Tosaki	Yuichi Shikato	Takashi Muraki	1.38.2
2016	Mont Saint Legame	Takuya Kowata	Koji Maki	Shinichi Yamashita	1:37.8
2015	Lani	Hiroyuki Uchida	Mikio Matsunaga	Yoko Maeda	1:37.4
Discontinued from 2008 to 2014
2007	Domingo City	Hiroki Goto	Yasuhito Tamura	Yushun Horse Co Ltd	1:38.8
2006	Red Bar Spin	Hiroki Goto	Masanori Sakaguchi	Yoshio Fujita	1:40.1
2005	Daiwa King Con	Hiroshi Kitamura	Sueo Masuzawa	Keizo Oshiro	1:40.0
2004	Gaily Snowman	Eiji Nakadate	Akio Tsurudome	Hiroaki Nakamura	1:39.1
2003	Dantsu Energy	Shinji Fujita	Kenji Yamauchi	Tetsuji Yamamoto	1:54.7

== See also ==
- Horse racing in Japan
- List of Japanese flat horse races
