= Fukuryu Stakes =

Japanese thoroughbred race

Fukuryu Stakes 伏竜ステークス
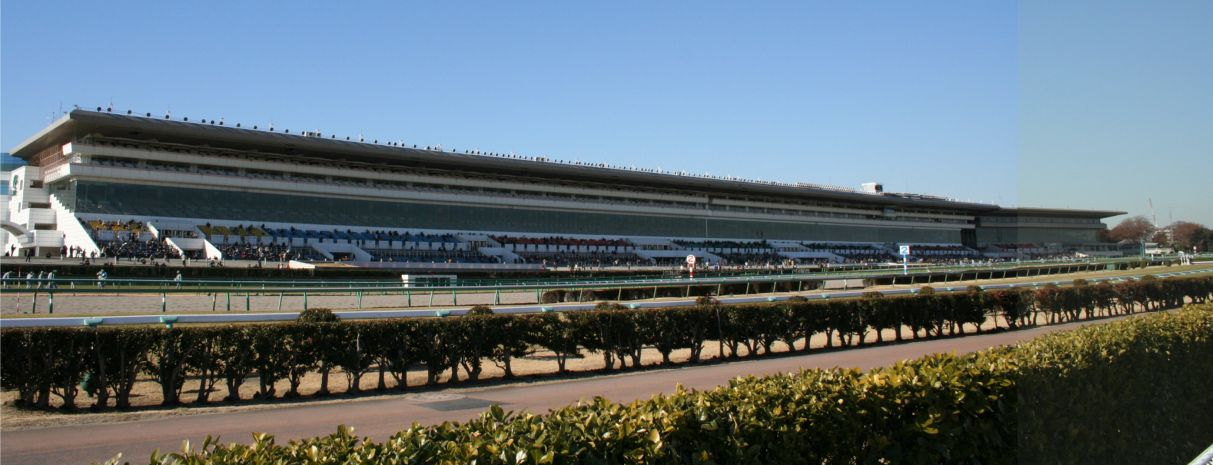
- Nakayama Racecourse
- Class: Open
- Location: Nakayama Racecourse, Funabashi, Chiba
- Inaugurated: 2000
- Race type: Thoroughbred - Flat racing

Race information
- Distance: 1,800 meters
- Surface: Dirt
- Track: Right-handed
- Qualification: Three-year-olds
- Weight: 56kg-57kg
- Purse: ¥ 41,140,000 (as of 2026): 1st: ¥ 19,000,000; 2nd: ¥ 7,600,000; 3rd: ¥ 4,800,000

The Fukuryu Stakes (in Japanese: 伏竜ステークス), is a race for three-year-old Thoroughbred colts and fillies in Japan. It is run over a distance of 1800 metres at Nakayama Racecourse.

== Race details ==
The race was first held in 2000. It is usually held at the end of March or the first week of April. There was no race held in 2011.

The race is a qualifier for the Kentucky Derby and is part of the Road to the Kentucky Derby.

It has always been held at Nakayama Racecourse.

== Winners ==
| Year | Winner | Jockey | Trainer | Owner | Time |
|---|---|---|---|---|---|
| 2026 | Danon Bourbon | Atsuya Nishimura | Manabu Ikezoe | Danox Co.,Ltd. | 1:50.9 |
| 2025 | Luxor Cafe | João Moreira | Noriyuki Hori | Koichi Nishikawa | 1:52.1 |
| 2024 | T O Password | Katsuma Sameshima | Daisuke Takayanagi | Tomoya Ozasa | 1:54.1 |
| 2023 | Mitono O | Takuya Kowata | Koji Maki | Royal Park | 1:51.9 |
| 2022 | Delicada | Ryuji Wada | Naohiro Yoshida | Teruya Yoshida | 1:52.1 |
| 2021 | God Selection | Yuji Nakai | Teiichi Konno | Hiroyuki Kawakatsu | 1:52.1 |
| 2020 | Herrschaft | Yusuke Fujioka | Kenji Nonaka | Kanayama Holdings Co Ltd | 1:53.4 |
| 2019 | Der Flug | Akihide Tsumura | Nobuhiro Suzuki | Isao Nishimori | 1:53.2 |
| 2018 | Don Fortis | Shu Ishibashi | Mitsunori Makiura | Koichi Yamada | 1:54.7 |
| 2017 | Resonator | Takuya Kohata | Koji Maki | Silk Racing Co Ltd | 1:52.6 |
| 2016 | Strong Barows | Christophe Lemaire | Noriyuki Hori | Hirotsugu Inokuma | 1:52.4 |
| 2015 | Cross Krieger | Yasunari Iwata | Yasushi Shono | Takashi Tsuji | 1:53.0 |
| 2014 | Runway Waltz | Keita Tosaki | Hidetaka Otonashi | Shimokobe Farm | 1:53.0 |
| 2013 | Copano Rickey | Yuichi Fukunaga | Akira Murayama | Sachiaki Kobayashi | 1:53.6 |
| 2012 | Hatano Vainqueur | Hirofumi Shii | Mitsugu Kon | Good Luck Farm Co Ltd | 1:53.5 |
No race was held
| 2010 | Tosen Ares | Norihiro Yokoyama | Yasuhiro Suzuki | Takaya Shimakawa | 1:53.4 |
| 2009 | Suni | Hiroyuki Uchida | Naohiro Yoshida | Kazumi Yoshida | 1:53.8 |
| 2008 | Nanyo River | Yoshitomi Shibata | Masahiro Ikegami | Tokuya Nakamura | 1:53.0 |
| 2007 | Meisho Aigle | Kenichi Ikezoe | Kaneo Ikezoe | Yoshio Matsumoto | 1:53.8 |
| 2006 | Friendship | Hirofumi Shii | Katsuhiko Sumii | Teruya Yoshida | 1:54.3 |
| 2005 | Daiwa King Con | Hiroshi Kitamura | Sueo Masuzawa | Keizo Oshiro | 1:54.3 |
| 2004 | Meisho Munemori | Hiroyuki Uchida | Futoshi Kojima | Yoshio Matsumoto | 1:55.2 |
| 2003 | Big Wolf | Mirco Demuro | Tadashi Nakao | U.Big | 1:54.1 |
| 2002 | D S Thunder | Masaki Katsura | Tatsuo Fujiwara | Toshiyuki Akiya | 1:53.0 |
| 2001 | Tagano Forty | Yoshitomi Shibata | Toshimasa Hashimoto | Ryoji Yagi | 1:51.0 |
| 2000 | Meiner Brian | Hiroshi Kitamura | Toru Miya | Thoroughbred Club Ruffian Co Ltd | 1:54.0 |

== See also ==
- Horse racing in Japan
- List of Japanese flat horse races
