= Chancer McPatrick =

American racehorse

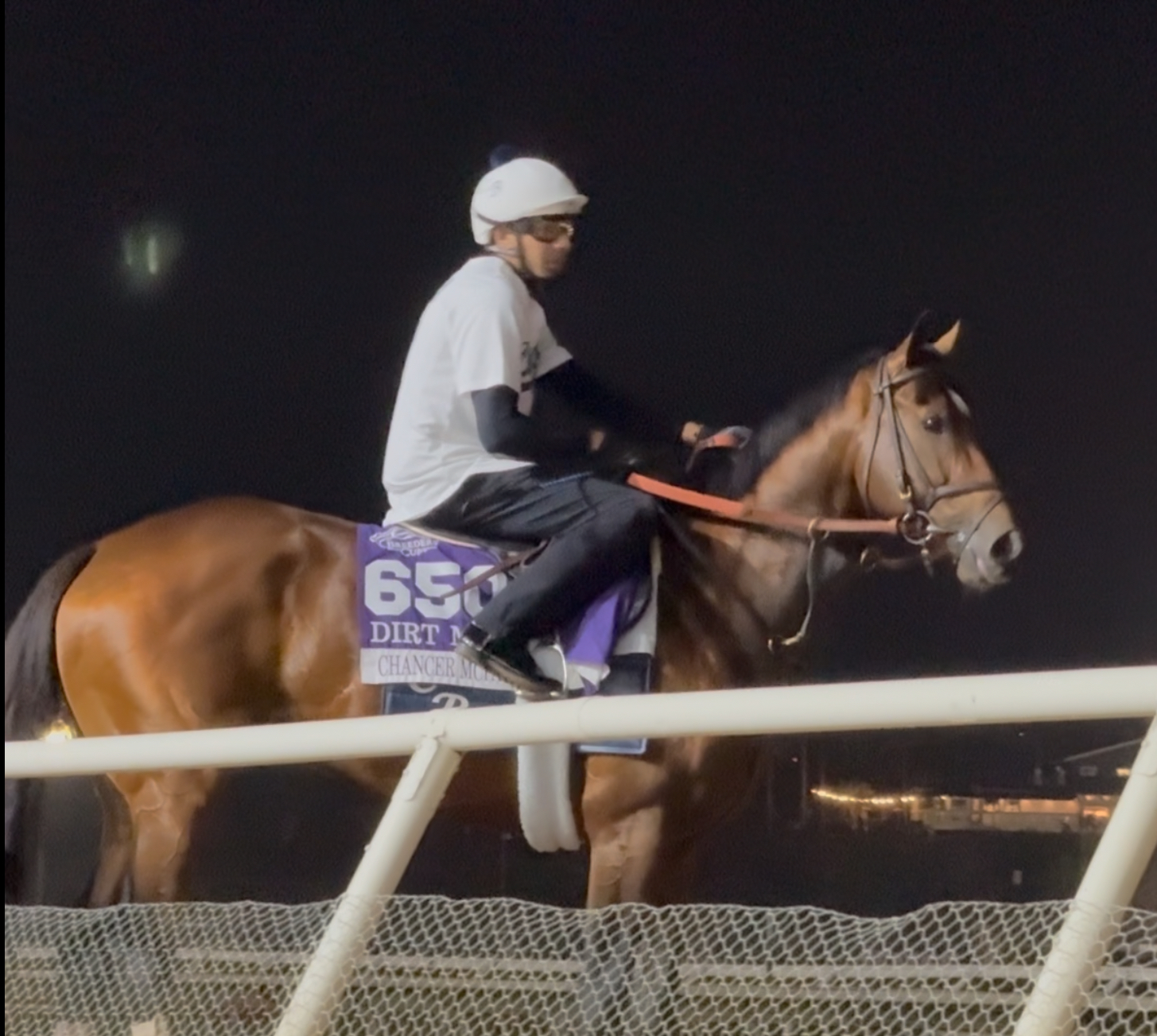
- Sire: McKinzie
- Grandsire: Street Sense
- Dam: Bernadreamy
- Damsire: Bernardini
- Sex: Colt
- Foaled: February 24, 2022
- Country: United States
- Color: Bay
- Breeder: Rigney Racing, LLC
- Owner: Flanagan Racing
- Trainer: Chad C. Brown
- Record: 10: 4 - 1 - 1
- Earnings: $817,875

Major wins
- Hopeful Stakes (2024); Champagne Stakes (2024)
- Last updated on September 15, 2025

Chancer McPatrick (foaled February 24, 2022) is a retired multiple Grade I winning American thoroughbred racehorse. As a two-year-old in 2024, he captured major victories in the Hopeful Stakes and the Champagne Stakes, establishing himself as one of the most promising juveniles of his generation.

== Background ==
Chancer McPatrick was bred in Kentucky by Rigney Racing, LLC. He is a bay colt by McKinzie, a multiple Grade 1-winning son of Street Sense, and out of the mare Bernadreamy, who is by Bernardini. Chancer McPatrick was sold as a yearling for $260,000 at the Fasig-Tipton Kentucky July Sale. He was then sold for $725,000 at the Ocala Breeders' Sales (OBS) Spring Sale of 2-Year-Olds in Training. Chancer McPatrick was trained by Chad C. Brown.

== Racing career ==
=== 2024: Two-year-old season ===
On September 2, 2024, Chancer McPatrick scored his first major victory in the Grade 1 Hopeful Stakes at Saratoga Race Course, showcasing a powerful closing kick to secure the win. On October 7, 2024, he followed up with a dominant performance in the Champagne Stakes at Belmont Park (held at Aqueduct due to renovations). His victory solidified his standing as a top contender for the Breeders' Cup Juvenile. On November 1, 2024, he made the trip to Del Mar to compete in the Breeders' Cup Juvenile, finishing 6th.

=== 2025: Three-year-old season ===
On March 8, 2025, Chancer McPatrick made his three-year-old debut in the Tampa Bay Derby. He finished second behind Owen Almighty.

== Statistics ==
Date	Distance	Race	Grade	Track	Odds	Field	Finish	Winning Time	Winning (Losing) Margin	Jockey	Ref
2024 – Two-year-old season
Jul 27, 2024	6 1/2 furlongs	Maiden Special Weight		Saratoga	2.35*	10	1	1:16.80	1 length	Flavien Prat	
Sep 2, 2024	7 furlongs	Hopeful Stakes	I	Saratoga	4.40	9	1	1:23.44	1 1/2 lengths	Flavien Prat	
Oct 5, 2024	1 mile	Champagne Stakes	I	Aqueduct	0.55*	9	1	1:36.51	2 3/4 lengths	Flavien Prat	
Nov 1, 2024	1 1/16 miles	Breeders' Cup Juvenile	I	Del Mar	2.20	10	6	1:43.07	(5 lengths)	Flavien Prat	
2025 – Three-year-old season
Mar 8, 2025	1 1/16 miles	Tampa Bay Derby	III	Tampa Bay Downs	2.10*	7	2	1:42.30	(2 3/4 lengths)	Flavien Prat	
Apr 8, 2025	1 1/8 miles	Blue Grass Stakes	I	Keeneland	2.58*	7	6 (Note: Chancer McPatrick dead-heated with Owen Almighty for 6th place)	1:51.33	(4 1/4 lengths)	Flavien Prat	
June 7, 2025	7 furlongs	Woody Stephens Stakes	I	Saratoga	3.80	11	7 (Note: Chancer McPatrick finished in a dead heat with Macho Music for seventh place)	1:21.36	(6 1/4 lengths)	Flavien Prat	
July 24, 2025	1 1/8 miles	Curlin Stakes	Listed	Saratoga	4.30	6	1	1:49.71	head	Irad Ortiz Jr.	
Aug 23, 2025	7 furlongs	H. Allen Jerkens Memorial Stakes	I	Saratoga	6.90	8	4	1:21.61	(3 1/2 lengths)	Irad Ortiz Jr.	
Nov 2, 2025	1 Mile	Breeders' Cup Dirt Mile	I	Del Mar	22.20	8	3	1:34.71	(3 1/4 lengths)	José Ortiz	

Notes:
An (*) asterisk after the odds means Chancer McPatrick was the post-time favorite.

== Stud ==
Chancer McPatrick will stand at Spendthrift Farm in 2026 for a fee of $25,000

== Pedigree ==
Pedigree of Chancer McPatrick, Bay Colt, foaled February 24, 2022
Sire McKinzie (2015)	Street Sense (2004)	Street Cry (IRE) (1998)	Machiavellian (1987)
Sire McKinzie (2015)	Street Sense (2004)	Street Cry (IRE) (1998)	Helen Street (1982)
Sire McKinzie (2015)	Street Sense (2004)	Bedazzle (1997)	Dixieland Band (1980)
Sire McKinzie (2015)	Street Sense (2004)	Bedazzle (1997)	Majestic Legend (1985)
Sire McKinzie (2015)	Runway Model (2002)	Petionville (1992)	Seeking the Gold (1985)
Sire McKinzie (2015)	Runway Model (2002)	Petionville (1992)	Vana Turns (1982)
Sire McKinzie (2015)	Runway Model (2002)	Ticket to Houston (1993)	Houston (1986)
Sire McKinzie (2015)	Runway Model (2002)	Ticket to Houston (1993)	Stave (1981)
Dam Bernadreamy (2012)	Bernardini (2003)	A. P. Indy (1989)	Seattle Slew (1974)
Dam Bernadreamy (2012)	Bernardini (2003)	A. P. Indy (1989)	Weekend Surprise (1980)
Dam Bernadreamy (2012)	Bernardini (2003)	Cara Rafaela (1993)	Quiet American (1986)
Dam Bernadreamy (2012)	Bernardini (2003)	Cara Rafaela (1993)	Oil Fable (1983)
Dam Bernadreamy (2012)	Dream Empress (2006)	Bernstein (1997)	Storm Cat (1983)
Dam Bernadreamy (2012)	Dream Empress (2006)	Bernstein (1997)	La Affirmed (1983)
Dam Bernadreamy (2012)	Dream Empress (2006)	Chinese Empress (1996)	Nijinsky II (1967)
Dam Bernadreamy (2012)	Dream Empress (2006)	Chinese Empress (1996)	Lazy One (1971)(family 4-r)
