= Burnham Square =

American racehorse

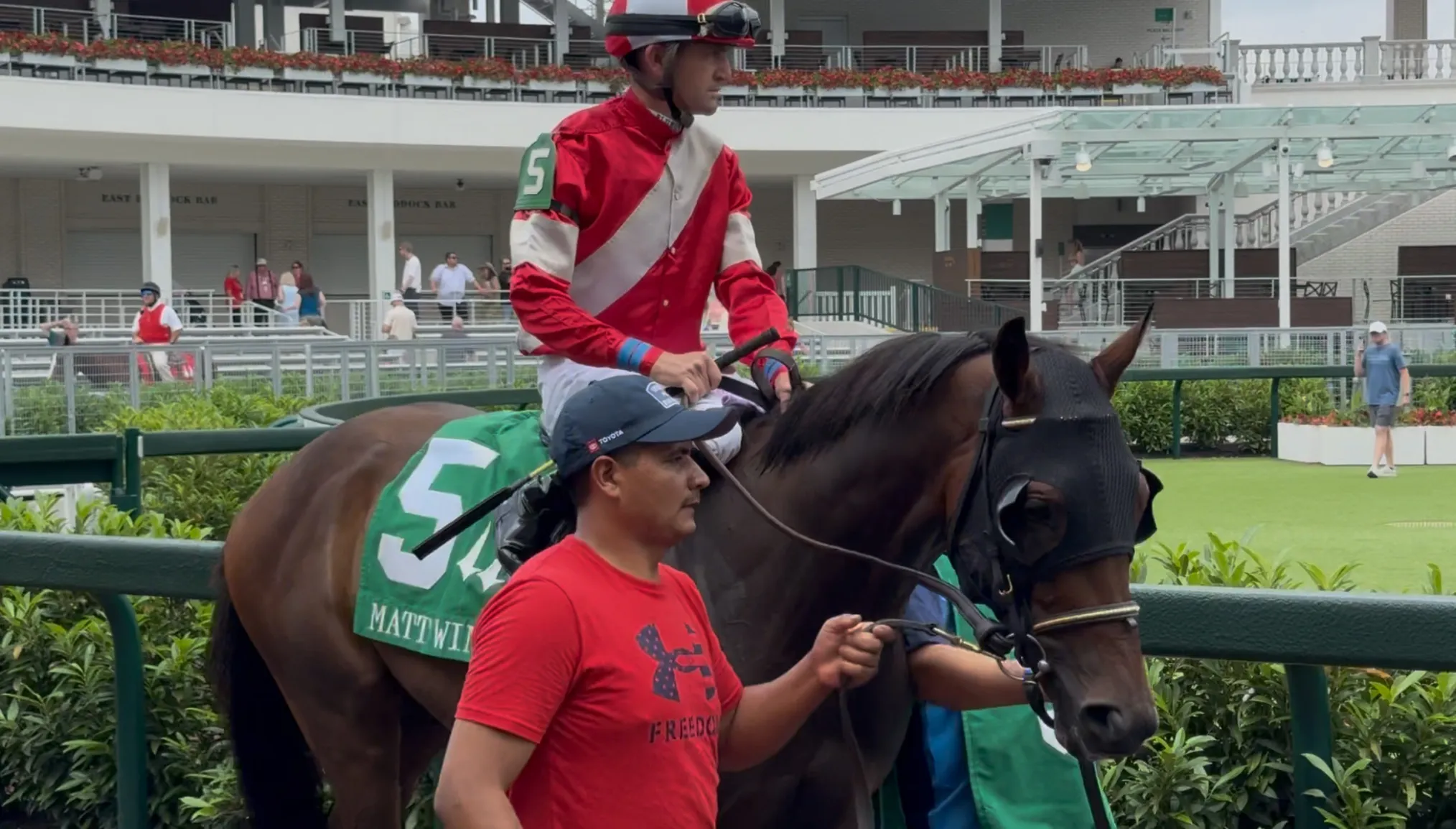
- Burnham Square parading in the Matt Winn
- Sire: Liam's Map
- Grandsire: Unbridled's Song
- Dam: Linda
- Damsire: Scat Daddy
- Sex: Gelding
- Foaled: April 9, 2022
- Country: United States
- Colour: Bay
- Breeder: Whitham Thoroughbreds
- Owner: Whitham Thoroughbreds
- Trainer: Ian R. Wilkes
- Record: 15: 7 - 4 - 1
- Earnings: US$2,884,244

Major wins
- Holy Bull Stakes (2025); Blue Grass Stakes (2025); Elkhorn Stakes (2026); Louisville Stakes (2026); Arlington Million Stakes (2026)
- Last updated on Aug 2, 2026

Burnham Square (foaled April 9, 2022) is a multiple Graded stakes-winning American Thoroughbred racehorse who won the Grade I Blue Grass Stakes at Keeneland in 2025 as a three-year-old and won the Grade I Arlington Million at Colonial Downs as four-year-old in 2026 after changed to Turf races.

== Background ==
Burnham Square is a bay gelding bred and owned by Whitham Thoroughbreds. His sire is Liam's Map and his dam is Linda who was sired by Scat Daddy. His dam Linda was also owned by Whitham Thoroughbreds and trained by Ian R. Wilkes won the 2016 Grade III Mrs. Revere Stakes at Churchill Downs winning $407,310 with a record of 3-4-5 in 15 starts. Second dam, Beautiful Noise was also a graded winner winning the 2001 Grade II Santa Ana Stakes at Santa Anita Park for Janis Whitham and the third dam, Listen Well was a winner at Belmont Park from champion Secretariat.

Burnham Square became the fifth Grade I winner for sire Liam's Map, who stands at Lane's End Farm in Versailles, Kentucky for an advertised fee of $40,000.

Burnham Square accrued the most qualification points in the 2025 Road to the Kentucky Derby.

== Statistics ==
Date	Distance	Race	Grade	Track	Odds	Field	Finish	Winning Time	Winning (Losing) Margin	Jockey	Ref
2024 – Two-year-old season
Oct 26, 2024	6 furlongs	Maiden Claiming		Keeneland	30.92	11	2nd	1:12.33	(1/2 length)	Francisco Arrieta	
Nov 30, 2024	1 1/16 miles	Maiden Special Weight		Churchill Downs	18.09	11	3rd	1:43.52	(3/4 length)	Francisco Arrieta	
Dec 28, 2024	1 1/16 miles	Maiden Special Weight		Gulfstream Park	1.30*	7	1st	1:44.31	9 lengths	Edgard Zayas	
2025 – Three-year-old season
Feb 1, 2025	1 1/16 miles	Holy Bull Stakes	III	Gulfstream Park	4.30	7	1st	1:43.60	1 3/4 lengths	Edgard Zayas	
Mar 2, 2024	1 1/16 miles	Fountain of Youth Stakes	II	Gulfstream Park	1.90*	6	4th	1:43.12	(3 lengths)	Edgard Zayas	
Apr 8, 2025	1 1/8 miles	Blue Grass Stakes	I	Keeneland	4.24	7	1st	1:51.33	nose	Brian Hernandez Jr.	
May 3, 2025	1 1/4 miles	Kentucky Derby	I	Churchill Downs	19.65	19	6th	2:02.31	(10 1/2 lengths)	Brian Hernandez Jr.	
Jun 8, 2025	1 1/16 miles	Matt Winn Stakes	III	Churchill Downs	2.65	4	2nd	1:42.12	(1/2 length)	Brian Hernandez Jr.	
Jul 19, 2025	1 1/8 miles	Haskell Stakes	I	Monmouth Park	10.20	8	5th	1:48.15	(8 1/2 lengths)	Brian Hernandez Jr.	
Aug 30, 2025	1 5/16 miles	Nashville Derby	III	Kentucky Downs	13.54	12	2nd	2:06.76	(head)	Brian Hernandez Jr.	
2026 – Four-year-old season
Feb 28, 2026	1 1/8 miles	Allowance Optional Claiming		Gulfstream Park	3.20	12	2nd	1:38.88	(2 1/4 lengths)	Edgar Zayas	
Apr 18, 2026	1 1/2 miles	Elkhorn Stakes	II	Keeneland	1.28*	11	1st	2:32.55	9 3/4 lengths	Brian Hernandez Jr.	
May 16, 2026	1 1/2 miles	Louisville Stakes	III	Churchill Downs	0.23*	6	1st	2:26.80	4 3/4 lengths	Brian Hernandez Jr.	
Jun 13, 2026	1 3/8 miles	Chorleywood Stakes	Listed	Churchill Downs	0.12*	8	1st	2:13.96	neck	Brian Hernandez Jr.	
Aug 1, 2026	1 1/4 miles	Arlington Million Stakes	I	Colonial Downs	0.80*	7	1st	2:00.80	1/2 length	Brian Hernandez Jr.	

Legend:
Dirt Turf

Notes:
An (*) asterisk after the odds means Burnham Square was the post-time favorite.

== Pedigree ==
Pedigree of Burnham Square, bay gelding, April 9, 2022
Sire Liam's Map (2013)	Unbridled's Song (1993)	Unbridled (1987)	Fappiano (1977)
Sire Liam's Map (2013)	Unbridled's Song (1993)	Unbridled (1987)	Gana Facil (1981)
Sire Liam's Map (2013)	Unbridled's Song (1993)	Trolley Song (1983)	Caro (IRE) (1967)
Sire Liam's Map (2013)	Unbridled's Song (1993)	Trolley Song (1983)	Lucky Spell (1971)
Sire Liam's Map (2013)	Miss Macy Sue (2003)	Trippi (1997)	End Sweep (1991)
Sire Liam's Map (2013)	Miss Macy Sue (2003)	Trippi (1997)	Jealous Appeal (1983)
Sire Liam's Map (2013)	Miss Macy Sue (2003)	Yada Yada (1996)	Great Above (1972)
Sire Liam's Map (2013)	Miss Macy Sue (2003)	Yada Yada (1996)	Stem (1982)
Dam Linda (2013)	Scat Daddy (2004)	Johannesburg (1999)	Hennessy (1993)
Dam Linda (2013)	Scat Daddy (2004)	Johannesburg (1999)	Myth (1993)
Dam Linda (2013)	Scat Daddy (2004)	Love Style (1999)	Mr. Prospector (1970)
Dam Linda (2013)	Scat Daddy (2004)	Love Style (1999)	Likeable Style (1990)
Dam Linda (2013)	Beautiful Noise (1996)	Sunny's Halo (CAN) (1980)	Halo (1969)
Dam Linda (2013)	Beautiful Noise (1996)	Sunny's Halo (CAN) (1980)	Mostly Sunny (CAN) (1971)
Dam Linda (2013)	Beautiful Noise (1996)	Listen Wall (1987)	Secretariat (1970)
Dam Linda (2013)	Beautiful Noise (1996)	Listen Wall (1987)	Margaret's Number (1970)(family 19-b)
