= Gun Runner Stakes =

- Location: Fair Grounds Race Course; New Orleans, Louisiana
- Inaugurated: 2021
- Race type: Thoroughbred - Flat racing

Race information
- Distance: 1-1/16 miles
- Surface: Dirt
- Track: Left-handed
- Qualification: Two-year-olds
- Purse: $100,000

The Gun Runner Stakes at Fair Grounds Race Course in New Orleans, Louisiana is a Thoroughbred horse race inaugurated on December 26, 2021, by track owner Churchill Downs Incorporated as the first race of their ongoing permanent series known as the Road to the Kentucky Derby.

The event is named in honor of Gun Runner, the 2017 American Horse of the Year and a 2024 U.S. Racing Hall of Fame inductee owned by Winchell Thoroughbreds LLC and Three Chimneys Farm. This race is contested annually in December at a distance of a mile and one-sixteenth on dirt and is open to two-year-old horses of either sex. It awards the first five finishers diminishing points with a minimum of one point to all participants which are used towards entry into the following year's Kentucky Derby run on the first Saturday in May.

The Gun Runner Stakes is currently followed in the series by the Grade 3 Lecomte Stakes which is held at the same New Orleans racetrack in mid-January.

== Points awarded the participants towards a starting place in the Kentucky Derby ==
- 1st: 10
- 2nd: 5
- 3rd: 3
- 4th: 2
- 5th: 1

== Winners ==
Year	Winner	Age	Jockey	Trainer	Owner	Dist. (Miles)	Time	Win$
2025	Chip Honcho	2	Paco Lopez	Steve Asmussen	Leland Ackerley Racing, LLC	1-1/16 m	1:44.76	$60,000
2024	Built	2	Jareth Loveberry	Wayne M. Catalano	Eclipse Thoroughbred Partners (Aaron Wellman)	1-1/16 m	1:43.53	$60,000
2023	Track Phantom	2	Christian Torres	Steve Asmussen	L and N Racing LLC, Clark O. Brewster, Jerry Caroom, Breeze Easy LLC	1-1/16 m	1:44.42	$60,000
2022	Jace's Road	2	Florent Geroux	Brad H. Cox	West Point Thoroughbreds/Albaugh Family Stables LLC	1-1/16 m	1:44.85	$60,000
2021	Epicenter	2	Brian Hernandez Jr.	Steven M. Asmussen	Winchell Thoroughbreds LLC	1-1/16 m	1:44.19	$60,000
