= Sandman (horse) =

American-bred Thoroughbred racehorse

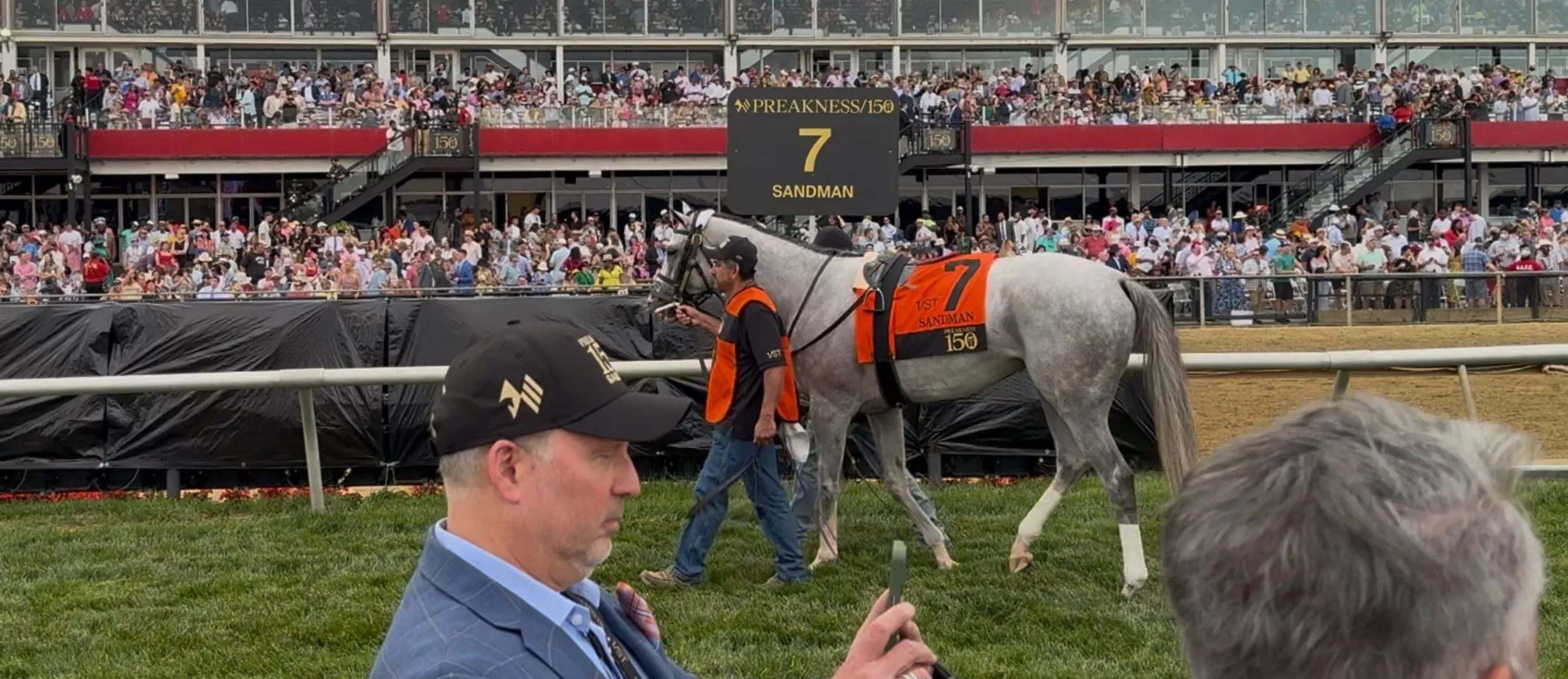
- Sandman parading before the Preakness Stakes
- Sire: Tapit
- Grandsire: Pulpit
- Dam: Distorted Music
- Damsire: Distorted Humor
- Sex: Colt
- Foaled: February 27, 2022 (age 4)
- Country: United States
- Color: Gray
- Breeder: Lothenbach Stables at Chesapeake Farm(Drew Nardiello)
- Owner: D. J. Stable, St. Elias Stable, West Point Thoroughbreds & CJ Stables
- Trainer: Mark E. Casse
- Record: 15: 3 - 1 - 3
- Earnings: US$1,547,831

Major wins
- Arkansas Derby (2025)
- Last updated on October 24, 2026

Sandman (foaled February 27, 2022) is an American Thoroughbred former racehorse who won the Grade I Arkansas Derby at Oaklawn Park in 2025 as a three-year-old.

== Background ==
Sandman is a gray colt that was bred in Kentucky by Robert Lothenbach of Lothenbach Stables. He was sired by Tapit, the leading sire in the US in 2014, 2015 and 2016. Tapit stands at Gainesway Farm for $185,000 as of 2025. Sandman is out of the Distorted Humor mare Distorted Music and is owned by D. J. Stable, St Elias Stable, West Point Thoroughbreds, and CJ Stables. He is also partially owned by social media influencer Griffin Johnson. Sandman's dam Distorted Music has produced three winners including She Can't Sing, who won the Grade III Chilukki Stakes at Churchill Downs in 2022.

Sandman was sold for $1,200,000 at the 2024 Ocala Breeders' Sales March Sale of 2-Year-Olds in Training on consignment as part of a complete dispersal for his breeder, Lothenbach Stables. The dispersal followed Bob Lothenbach of Lothenbach Stables' death in November 2023 at age 64.

A recent dispute over the naming of Sandman may prove that Sandman was named after a common advert slogan used in a commercial for the Waterbed Emporium–"Tell 'em the Sandman sent ya!". The Waterbed Emporium is a famous furniture retailer based in Cleveland, Ohio, which has links to the family of former Guns N' Roses drummer, Steven Adler. Social media influencers claim Sandman was named for the 1991 Metallica song "Enter Sandman" as a nod to Hall of Fame closer Mariano Rivera's entrance song.

Plans for Sandman's retirement were announced in September 2026, where the statement also published that he was slated to stand as a breeding stallion at Rockridge Stud in 2027, commanding a fee of $10,000. Sandman's retirement was officially announced in early October, after he finished as the trailing, or second-to-last horse in every race of his four-year-old season.

== Statistics ==
Date	Distance	Race	Grade	Track	Odds	Field	Finish	Winning Time	Winning (Losing) Margin	Jockey	Ref
2024 – Two-year-old season
Jun 27, 2024	6 furlongs	Maiden Special Weight		Churchill Downs	1.04*	7	5	1:09.97	(11 1/2 lengths)	Jose Ortiz	
Aug 10, 2024	7 furlongs	Maiden Special Weight		Saratoga	2.05	7	1	1:23.62	1 3/4 lengths	Dylan Davis	
Sep 14, 2024	1 mile	Iroquois Stakes	III	Churchill Downs	5.21	11	5	1:36.08	(10 lengths)	Jose Ortiz	
Oct 27, 2024	1 1/16 miles	Street Sense Stakes	III	Churchill Downs	2.70	9	3	1:43.86	(5 1/4 lengths)	Brian Hernandez Jr.	
Dec 13, 2024	1 mile	Allowance Optional Claiming		Oaklawn Park	1.60*	9	1	1:38.71	1 3/4 lengths	Cristian Torres	
2025 – Three-year-old season
Jan 25, 2025	1 1/16 miles	Southwest Stakes	III	Oaklawn Park	6.40	9	2	1:45.86	(1 length)	Cristian Torres	
Feb 23, 2025	1 1/16 miles	Rebel Stakes	II	Oaklawn Park	2.50*	13	3	1:43.01	(1 3/4 lengths)	Cristian Torres	
Mar 29, 2025	1 1/8 miles	Arkansas Derby	I	Oaklawn Park	3.70	9	1	1:50.08	2 1/2 lengths	Jose Ortiz	
May 3, 2025	1 1/4 miles	Kentucky Derby	I	Churchill Downs	5.77	19	7	2:02.31	(12 lengths)	Jose Ortiz	
May 17, 2025	1 3/16 miles	Preakness Stakes	I	Pimlico	6.40	9	3	1:55.47	(2 3/4 lengths)	John R. Velazquez	
July 26, 2025	1 1/8 miles	Jim Dandy Stakes	II	Saratoga	6.70	5	5	1:49.52	(10 3/4 lengths)	Jose Ortiz	
August 8, 2025	1 5/16 miles	Nashville Derby	III	Kentucky Downs	7.53	12	9	2:06.76	(13 lengths)	Jose Ortiz	
2026 – Four-year-old season
February 7, 2026	1 1/16 miles	Allowance Optional Claiming		Oaklawn Park	7.30	1	5	1:44.04	(2 1/4 Lengths)	Jose Ortiz	
February 28. 2026	1 1/16 miles	Razorback Handicap	III	Oaklawn Park	3.20	6	6	1:42.1	(18 Lengths)	Cristian Torres	
October 4, 2026	1 1/16 miles	Allowance Optional Claiming		Belmont Park	3.66	6	6	1:40.75	(15 1/4 Lengths)	Dylan Davis	

Notes:
An (*) asterisk after the odds means Sandman was the post-time favorite.

== Pedigree ==
Pedigree of Sandman, Gray colt, February 27, 2023
Sire Tapit (2001)	Pulpit (1994)	A.P. Indy (1989)	Seattle Slew (1974)
Sire Tapit (2001)	Pulpit (1994)	A.P. Indy (1989)	Weekend Surprise (1980)
Sire Tapit (2001)	Pulpit (1994)	Preach (1989)	Mr. Prospector* (1970)
Sire Tapit (2001)	Pulpit (1994)	Preach (1989)	Narrate (1980)
Sire Tapit (2001)	Tap Your Heels (1996)	Unbridled* (1987)	Fappiano* (1977)
Sire Tapit (2001)	Tap Your Heels (1996)	Unbridled* (1987)	Gana Facil (1981)
Sire Tapit (2001)	Tap Your Heels (1996)	Ruby Slippers (1982)	Nijinsky II (CAN) (1967)
Sire Tapit (2001)	Tap Your Heels (1996)	Ruby Slippers (1982)	Moon Glitter (1972)
Dam Distorted Music (2010)	Distorted Humor (1993)	Forty Niner (1985)	Mr. Prospector* (1970)
Dam Distorted Music (2010)	Distorted Humor (1993)	Forty Niner (1985)	File (1976)
Dam Distorted Music (2010)	Distorted Humor (1993)	Danzig's Beauty (1987)	Danzig (1977)
Dam Distorted Music (2010)	Distorted Humor (1993)	Danzig's Beauty (1987)	Sweetest Chant (1978)
Dam Distorted Music (2010)	Music Room (2003)	Unbridled's Song (1993)	Unbridled* (1987)
Dam Distorted Music (2010)	Music Room (2003)	Unbridled's Song (1993)	Trolley Song (1983)
Dam Distorted Music (2010)	Music Room (2003)	Note Musicale (GB) (1995)	Sadler's Wells (1981)
Dam Distorted Music (2010)	Music Room (2003)	Note Musicale (GB) (1995)	It's In The Air* (1976) (family 4-k)

*Sandman is inbred 3S x 4D to the stallion Unbridled, meaning that he appears third generation on the sire side of his pedigree and fourth generation on the dam side of his pedigree.

* Sandman is inbred 4S x 5S x 4D x 5D to the stallion Mr. Prospector, meaning that he appears in the fourth and fifth generation (via Fappiano) on the sire side of his pedigree and the fourth and fifth generation (via It's In The Air) on the dam side of his pedigree.
