= Cardinal Stakes (Great Britain) =

Flat horse race in England

- Class: Conditions
- Location: Chelmsford City Racecourse; Great Leighs, England
- Inaugurated: 2019
- Race type: Flat / Thoroughbred
- Sponsor: bet365
- Website: Chelmsford City

Race information
- Distance: 1 mile (1,609 metres)
- Surface: Polytrack
- Track: Left-handed
- Qualification: Three-year-olds
- Weight: 9 st 5 lb Allowances; 5 lb for fillies
- Purse: £100,000 (2025); 1st: £51,540

This article is about an English horse race. For the American horse race with the same name, see Cardinal Stakes (USA).

Cardinal Stakes
2025
Detain	Luther	Port Light

Previous years
2024
Bracken's Laugh	Orne	Capulet
2023
Bold Act	Brave Emperor	Killybegs Warrior
2022
Dark Moon Rising	Harrow	Find
2021
Fundamental	Qaader	Moraaheq

2020-2019
2019
Bye Bye Hong Kong	Antilles	Dark Vision

The Cardinal Stakes is a flat horse race in Great Britain open to three-year-old horses. It is run at Chelmsford City over a distance of 1 mile.

The race was run for the first time in 2019 as the last of seven races in the European Road to the Kentucky Derby series, through which horses earn points and the chance to qualify for the Kentucky Derby. It replaced Newcastle's Burradon Stakes in the European series. From 2025 the race will no longer be part of the Road to the Kentucky Derby series but the winner will receive an entry to the American Turf Stakes on the Kentucky Derby card.

== Winners ==
Year	Winner	Jockey	Trainer	Time
2019	Bye Bye Hong Kong	Silvestre de Sousa	Andrew Balding	1:36.90
2020	no race (Note: The 2020 running was cancelled because of the COVID-19 pandemic in the United Kingdom)
2021	Fundamental	Robert Havlin	John & Thady Gosden	1:37.40
2022	Dark Moon Rising	Kevin Stott	Kevin Ryan	1:37.99
2023	Bold Act	Harry Davies	Charlie Appleby	1:37.23
2024	Bracken's Laugh	Finley Marsh	Richard Hughes	1:38.26
2025	Detain	Kieran Shoemark	John & Thady Gosden	1:34.73
2026 (Note: The 2026 race was run at Southwell due to Chelmsford City losing its BHA licence)	Yazin	Ryan Moore	John & Thady Gosden	1:45.07

== See also ==
- Horse racing in Great Britain
- List of British flat horse races
- Road to the Kentucky Derby Conditions Stakes
