= Citizen Bull =

American racehorse

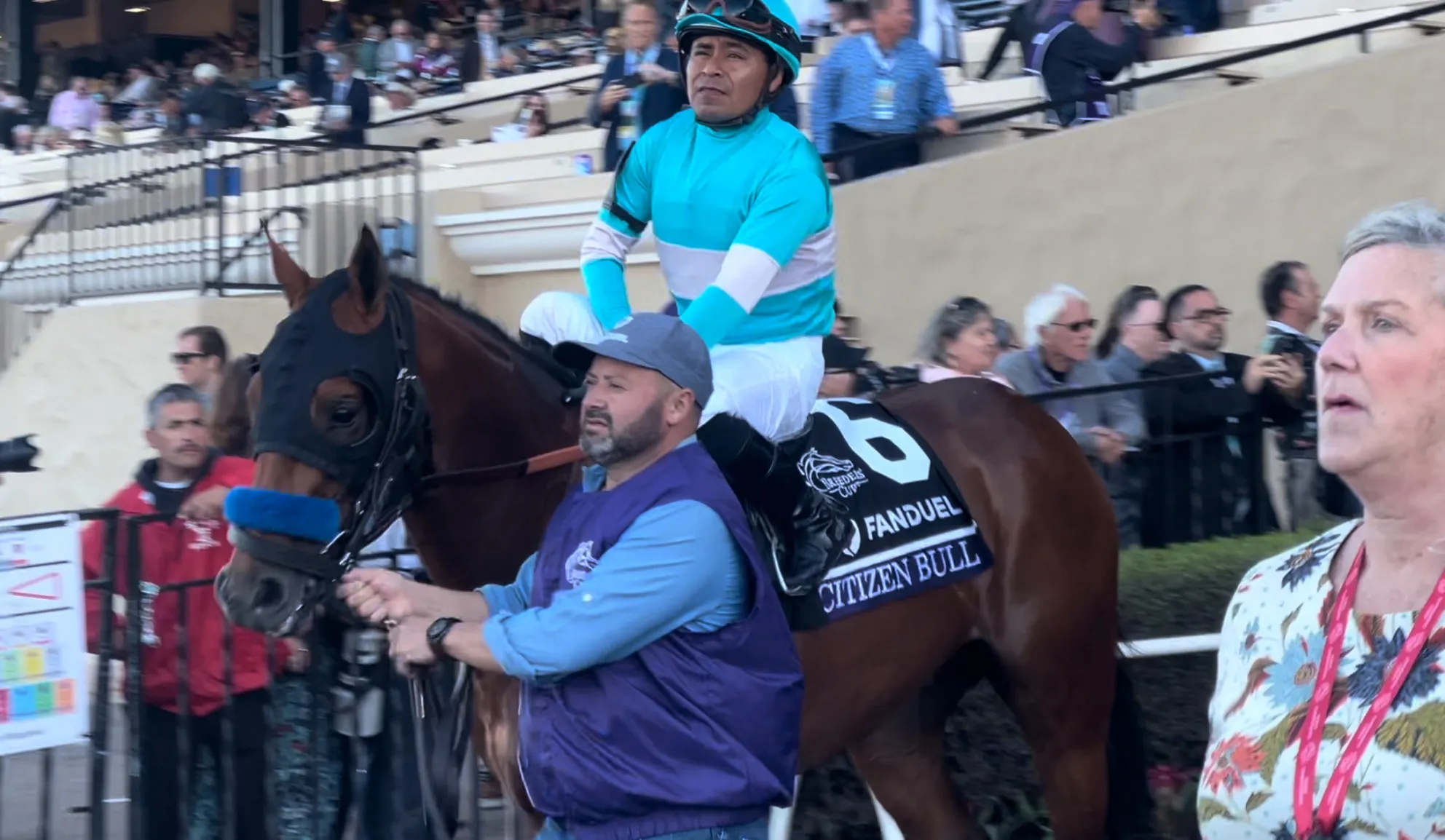
- Citizen Bull before the Breeders Cup Juvenile
- Sire: Into Mischief
- Grandsire: Harlan's Holiday
- Dam: No Joke
- Damsire: Distorted Humor
- Sex: Colt
- Foaled: 2 April 2022
- Country: United States
- Colour: Bay
- Breeder: Robert & Lawana Low
- Owner: SF Racing, Starlight Racing, Madaket Stables, Robert E. Masterson, Stonestreet Stables, Dianne Bashor, Determined Stables, Tom J. Ryan, Waves Edge Capital & Catherine Donovan
- Trainer: Bob Baffert
- Record: 10: 5 - 1 - 1
- Earnings: US$1,726,000

Major wins
- American Pharoah Stakes (2024); Robert B. Lewis Stakes (2025); Shared Belief Stakes (2025); Breeders' Cup; Breeders' Cup Juvenile (2024)

Awards
- American Champion Two-Year-Old Male Horse (2024)
- Last updated on November 5, 2025

Citizen Bull (foaled 2 April 2022) is a champion American Thoroughbred racehorse. As a two-year-old, won the Grade I American Pharoah Stakes and Breeders' Cup Juvenile.

== Background ==
Citizen Bull is a bay colt bred in Kentucky by Robert and Lawana Low. His sire is Into Mischief and his dam is No Joke who was sired by Distorted Humor.

Citizen Bull is owned by SF Racing, Starlight Racing, Sol Kumin's Madaket Stables, Stonestreet Stables, Dianne Bashor, Determined Stables, Robert Masterson, Tom J. Ryan, Waves Edge Capital, and Catherine Donovan. Citizen Bull was purchased for $675,000 from the Taylor Made Sales Agency consignment at the 2023 Keeneland September Yearling Sale.

== Statistics ==
Date	Distance	Race	Grade	Track	Odds	Field	Finish	Winning Time	Winning (Losing) Margin	Jockey	Ref
2024 – two-year-old season
Aug 17, 2024	5 1/2 furlongs	Maiden Special Weight		Del Mar	2.60	6	1	1:03.42	3/4 length	Martin Garcia	
Sep 8, 2024	7 furlongs	Del Mar Futurity	I	Del Mar	1.30*	7	3	1:23.02	(5 3/4 lengths)	Mike E. Smith	
Oct 5, 2024	1 1/16 miles	American Pharoah Stakes	I	Santa Anita	3.30	7	1	1:44.30	2 lengths	Martin Garcia	
Nov 1, 2024	1 1/16 miles	Breeders' Cup Juvenile	I	Del Mar	15.90	10	1	1:43.07	1 1/2 lengths	Martin Garcia	
2025 – three-year-old season
Feb 1, 2025	1 mile	Robert B. Lewis Stakes	III	Santa Anita	0.90*	5	1	1:36.71	3 3/4 lengths	Martin Garcia	
Apr 5, 2025	1 1/8 miles	Santa Anita Derby	I	Santa Anita	2.10	5	4	1:49.56	(9 3/4 lengths)	Martin Garcia	
May 3, 2025	1 1/4 miles	Kentucky Derby	I	Churchill Downs	13.98	19	15	2:02.31	(33 1/2 lengths)	Martin Garcia	
June 7, 2025	7 furlongs	Woody Stephens Stakes	I	Saratoga	4.60	11	4	1:21.36	(5 3/4 lengths)	Mike E. Smith	
Aug 23, 2025	1 mile	Shared Belief Stakes	Listed	Del Mar	0.40*	3	1	1:35.12	5 1/2 lengths	Juan J. Hernandez	
Nov 1, 2025	1 mile	Breeders' Cup Dirt Mile	I	Del Mar	5.60	8	2	1:34.71	(head)	Juan J. Hernandez	

Notes:
An (*) asterisk after the odds means Citizen Bull was the post-time favourite.

== Pedigree ==
Pedigree of Citizen Bull, bay colt, 2 April 2022
Sire Into Mischief (2005)	Harlan's Holiday (1999)	Harlan (1989)	Storm Cat (1983)
Sire Into Mischief (2005)	Harlan's Holiday (1999)	Harlan (1989)	Country Romance (1976)
Sire Into Mischief (2005)	Harlan's Holiday (1999)	Christmas in Aiken (1992)	Affirmed (1975)
Sire Into Mischief (2005)	Harlan's Holiday (1999)	Christmas in Aiken (1992)	Dowager (1980)
Sire Into Mischief (2005)	Leslie's Lady (1996)	Tricky Creek (1986)	Clever Trick (1976)
Sire Into Mischief (2005)	Leslie's Lady (1996)	Tricky Creek (1986)	Battle Creek Girl (1977)
Sire Into Mischief (2005)	Leslie's Lady (1996)	Crystal Lady (CAN) (1990)	Stop The Music (1970)
Sire Into Mischief (2005)	Leslie's Lady (1996)	Crystal Lady (CAN) (1990)	One Last Bird (1980)
Dam No Joke (2016)	Distorted Humor (1993)	Forty Niner (1985)	Mr. Prospector (1970)
Dam No Joke (2016)	Distorted Humor (1993)	Forty Niner (1985)	File (1976)
Dam No Joke (2016)	Distorted Humor (1993)	Danzig's Beauty (1987)	Danzig (1977)
Dam No Joke (2016)	Distorted Humor (1993)	Danzig's Beauty (1987)	Sweetest Chant (1978)
Dam No Joke (2016)	Unenchantedevening (2004)	Unbridled's Song (1993)	Unbridled (1987)
Dam No Joke (2016)	Unenchantedevening (2004)	Unbridled's Song (1993)	Trolley Song (1983)
Dam No Joke (2016)	Unenchantedevening (2004)	Evil Elaine (1984)	Medieval Man (1976)
Dam No Joke (2016)	Unenchantedevening (2004)	Evil Elaine (1984)	Distinctive Elaine (1972) (family 9-e)
