= Street Sense Stakes =

Grade III Thoroughbred horse race

- Class: Grade III
- Location: Churchill Downs; Louisville, Kentucky, United States
- Inaugurated: 2013
- Race type: Thoroughbred – Flat racing
- Website: Churchill Downs

Race information
- Distance: 1 1/16 miles
- Surface: Dirt
- Track: left-handed
- Qualification: Two-year-olds
- Weight: 122lbs
- Purse: US$200,000 (since 2021)

The Street Sense Stakes is a Grade III American Thoroughbred horse race for two-year-olds over a distance of 1 1/16 miles on the dirt scheduled annually in late October or early November at Churchill Downs in Louisville, Kentucky. The event currently offers a purse of $200,000.

== History ==
The event is named after Street Sense the 2006 U.S. Champion Two-Year-Old Colt who won the Breeders' Cup Juvenile at Churchill Downs and won the 2007 Kentucky Derby.

The event was inaugurated on 27 October 2013 and run over a distance of one mile and was won by John C. Oxley's Coastline. Coastline starting at odds of 4/1 was ridden by jockey Shaun Bridgmohan who pressed the pace three wide, gained a short lead with a furlong to go and drew clear to win by three lengths over Ichiban Warrior in a time of 1:36.77.

One of the most impressive of the winners of the event was the 2018 winner Improbable who dominated the field, winning by 7 1/4 lengths. As a four-year-old, Improbable won three Grade I events and was second in the 2020 GI Breeders' Cup Classic. His performance earned him U.S. Champion Older Male Horse honors.

In 2020, the distance for the event was increased to 1 1/16 mile.

In 2022 the event was upgraded by the Thoroughbred Owners and Breeders Association to a Grade III.

In 2023 the event was included in the qualification process for the Kentucky Derby as an event in the prep season in the Road to the Kentucky Derby. The 2024 winner Sovereignty, confirmed the quality of this event by winning the 2025 Kentucky Derby and the 2025 Belmont Stakes.

== Records ==
Speed record

- 1 1/16 miles: 1:41.31 – Two Phil's (2022)
- 1 mile: 1:35.55 – McCraken (2016)

Margins

- 7 1/4 lengths – Improbable (2018)

Most wins by a jockey

- 2 – Shaun Bridgmohan (2013, 2014)
- 2 – Brian Hernandez Jr. (2016, 2020)

Most wins by a trainer

- 2 – Mark E. Casse (2013, 2014)
- 2 – Ian R. Wilkes (2016, 2017)

Most wins by an owner

- No owner has won the event more than once

== Winners ==
Year	Winner	Jockey	Trainer	Owner	Distance	Time	Purse	Grade	Ref
2026	Jas	Keith Asmussen	Steven M. Asmussen	Red Lane Thoroughbreds	1 1/16 miles	1:43.99	$195,000	III	
2025	Incredibolt	Jaime Torres	Riley Mott	Pin Oak Stud	1 1/16 miles	1:44.67	$200,000	III	
2024	Sovereignty	Junior Alvarado	William I. Mott	Godolphin	1 1/16 miles	1:43.86	$197,500	III	
2023	Liberal Arts	Cristian A. Torres	Robert Medina	Stephen Ferraro & Evan Ferraro	1 1/16 miles	1:46.50	$199,000	III	
2022	Two Phil's	Jareth Loveberry	Larry Rivelli	Patricia's Hope & Phillip Segan	1 1/16 miles	1:41.31	$199,800	III	
2021	Howling Time	Joseph Talamo	Dale L. Romans	Albaugh Family Stables	1 1/16 miles	1:44.68	$200,000	Listed	
2020	King Fury	Brian Hernandez Jr.	Kenneth G. McPeek	Fern Circle Stables & Three Chimneys Farm	1 1/16 miles	1:44.30	$98,000	Listed	
2019	South Bend	Julien R. Leparoux	Stanley Hough	Sagamore Farm	1 mile	1:35.56	$123,664		
2018	Improbable	Drayden Van Dyke	Bob Baffert	WinStar Farm, China Horse Club & SF Racing	1 mile	1:35.61	$100,000		
2017	Gotta Go	Chris Landeros	Ian R. Wilkes	Lothenbach Stables	1 mile	1:37.48	$83,001		
2016	McCraken	Brian Hernandez Jr.	Ian R. Wilkes	Whitham Thoroughbreds	1 mile	1:35.55	$83,470		
2015	Mo Tom	Corey J. Lanerie	Chris Richard	G M B Racing	1 mile	1:36.78	$81,750		
2014	Conquest Tsunami	Shaun Bridgmohan	Mark E. Casse	Conquest Stables	1 mile	1:37.00	$55,221		
2013	Coastline	Shaun Bridgmohan	Mark E. Casse	John C. Oxley	1 mile	1:36.77	$61,800		

== See also ==
- List of American and Canadian Graded races
