= Tappan Street (horse) =

American racehorse

- Sire: Into Mischief
- Grandsire: Harlan's Holiday
- Dam: Virginia Key
- Damsire: Distorted Humor
- Sex: Colt
- Foaled: February 24, 2022
- Country: United States
- Colour: Bay
- Breeder: Blue Heaven Farm
- Owner: 1. China Horse Club, WinStar Farm & Siena Farm (until Dec. 31, 2024); 2. China Horse Club, WinStar Farm & Cold Press Racing (Since Jan. 2025)
- Trainer: Brad H. Cox
- Record: 6: 3 - 1 - 0
- Earnings: US$677,900

Major wins
- Florida Derby (2025)
- Last updated on May 2, 2026

Tappan Street (foaled February 24, 2022) is an American Thoroughbred racehorse who won the Grade I Florida Derby at Gulfstream Park in 2025 as a three-year-old.

== Background ==
Tappan Street is a bay colt bred in Kentucky by Blue Heaven Farm. His sire is Into Mischief and his dam is Virginia Key who was sired by Distorted Humor.

Tappan Street was purchased as a yearling for $1 million at the 2023 edition of Fasig-Tipton's The Saratoga Sale by China Horse Club, Siena Farm, and Maverick Racing. The colt was to be named after Siena Farm's owner Anthony Manganaro, who died in August 2023, just two weeks after the colt was purchased, but the name had been taken, and the connections chose to name the colt after the street on which Manganaro grew up.

Tappan Street became the 23rd Grade I winner for six-time leading sire Into Mischief, who stands at Spendthrift Farm near Lexington, Kentucky, for an advertised fee of $250,000.

== Career ==
One week before the Kentucky Derby while training suffered a condylar fracture and was not entered in the event.

== Statistics ==
Date	Distance	Race	Grade	Track	Odds	Field	Finish	Winning Time	Winning (Losing) Margin	Jockey	Ref
2024 – Two-year-old season
Dec 28, 2024	7 furlongs	Maiden Special Weight		Gulfstream Park	2.30*	12	1	1:23.46	1 3/4 lengths	Luis Saez	
2025 – Three-year-old season
Feb 1, 2025	1 1/16 miles	Holy Bull Stakes	III	Gulfstream Park	1.70*	7	2	1:43.60	(1 3/4 lengths)	Luis Saez	
Mar 29, 2025	1 1/8 miles	Florida Derby	I	Gulfstream Park	2.40	10	1	1:49.27	1 1/4 lengths	Luis Saez	
Dec 19, 2025	1 mile	Allowance Optional Claiming		Gulfstream Park	0.10*	6	1	1:36.59	1 length	Irad Ortiz Jr.	
2026 – Four-year-old season
Jan 24, 2026	1 1/8 miles	Pegasus World Cup	I	Gulfstream Park	3.30	12	12	1:48.67	(22 1/2 lengths)	Luis Saez	
May 1, 2026	1 1/16 miles	Alysheba Stakes	II	Churchill Downs	5.65	7	7	1:41.82	(8 3/4 lengths)	Luis Saez	

Notes:
An (*) asterisk after the odds means Tappan Street was the post-time favorite.

== Pedigree ==
Pedigree of Tappan Street, bay colt, February 24, 2022
Sire Into Mischief (2005)	Harlan's Holiday (1999)	Harlan (1989)	Storm Cat (1983)
Sire Into Mischief (2005)	Harlan's Holiday (1999)	Harlan (1989)	Country Romance (1976)
Sire Into Mischief (2005)	Harlan's Holiday (1999)	Christmas in Aiken (1992)	Affirmed (1975)
Sire Into Mischief (2005)	Harlan's Holiday (1999)	Christmas in Aiken (1992)	Dowager (1980)
Sire Into Mischief (2005)	Leslie's Lady (1996)	Tricky Creek (1986)	Clever Trick (1976)
Sire Into Mischief (2005)	Leslie's Lady (1996)	Tricky Creek (1986)	Battle Creek Girl (1977)
Sire Into Mischief (2005)	Leslie's Lady (1996)	Crystal Lady (CAN) (1990)	Stop The Music (1970)
Sire Into Mischief (2005)	Leslie's Lady (1996)	Crystal Lady (CAN) (1990)	One Last Bird (1980)
Dam Virginia Key (2015)	Distorted Humor (1993)	Forty Niner (1985)	Mr. Prospector (1970)
Dam Virginia Key (2015)	Distorted Humor (1993)	Forty Niner (1985)	File (1976)
Dam Virginia Key (2015)	Distorted Humor (1993)	Danzig's Beauty (1987)	Danzig (1977)
Dam Virginia Key (2015)	Distorted Humor (1993)	Danzig's Beauty (1987)	Sweetest Chant (1978)
Dam Virginia Key (2015)	Our Khrysty (2006)	Newfoundland (2000)	Storm Cat (1983)
Dam Virginia Key (2015)	Our Khrysty (2006)	Newfoundland (2000)	Clear Mandate (1992)
Dam Virginia Key (2015)	Our Khrysty (2006)	The Hess Express (1998)	Lord Carson (1992)
Dam Virginia Key (2015)	Our Khrysty (2006)	The Hess Express (1998)	Turcomedy (1990) (family 13-c)

* Tappan Street is inbred 4S x 4D to the stallion Storm Cat, meaning that he appears fourth generation on the sire side of his pedigree and fourth generation on the dam side of his pedigree.
