= Sovereignty (horse) =

Thoroughbred race horse, winner of the 2025 Kentucky Derby and Belmont Stakes

- Sovereignty before the 2026 Stephen Foster Stakes.
- Breed: Thoroughbred
- Sire: Into Mischief
- Grandsire: Harlan's Holiday
- Dam: Crowned
- Damsire: Bernardini
- Sex: Colt
- Foaled: February 22, 2022 (age 4); Kentucky, U.S.
- Country: United States
- Color: Bay
- Breeder: Godolphin
- Owner: Godolphin
- Trainer: William I. Mott
- Record: 13: 8–3–1
- Earnings: $10,476,550

Major wins
- Street Sense Stakes (2024); Fountain of Youth Stakes (2025); Jim Dandy Stakes (2025); Travers Stakes (2025); Whitney Stakes (2026); American Triple Crown wins: Kentucky Derby (2025); Belmont Stakes (2025); Breeders' Cup wins: Breeders' Cup Classic (2026)

Awards
- American Champion 3-Year-Old Male (2025); American Horse of the Year (2025)
- Last updated on November 1st, 2026

Sovereignty (foaled February 22, 2022) is an American retired Thoroughbred racehorse. He won multiple graded stakes races, most notable the 2025 Kentucky Derby, Belmont Stakes, Travers Stakes, and the 2026 Breeders' Cup Classic.

Sovereignty became the first horse to win two legs of the American Triple Crown (the Kentucky Derby and the Belmont Stakes) since Justify swept all three Triple Crown races in 2018.

== Background ==
Sovereignty is owned by Godolphin, the thoroughbred stables whose proprietor is Sheikh Mohammed bin Rashid Al Maktoum, the Emir of Dubai.

Sovereignty's sire is Into Mischief, a Grade I winner at the age of two who has been North America's leading sire by purse winnings in multiple years since 2018. Sovereignty's dam is Crowned, an unraced mare whose sire is Bernardini (2003–2021), the American champion three-year-old of 2006 with victories in the Preakness Stakes, Travers Stakes, and Jockey Club Gold Cup. Sovereignty's maternal grandmother, Mushka, is a winner of three graded races, including the Grade I Spinster Stakes. Sovereignty's pedigree includes three Triple Crown winners in Secretariat, Seattle Slew, and Affirmed.

== Racing career ==
=== 2024: two-year-old season ===
Sovereignty lost his first race against maiden company at Saratoga in August 2024.

In his second start at Aqueduct in September, he was beaten by a neck.

At the end of October, trainer Bill Mott sent Sovereignty into stakes company at Churchill Downs in the Grade III Street Sense Stakes over a distance of 1 1/16 miles. Leaving the gate a step slow and spotting the field in last place, Sovereignty rallied on the outside through the Churchill stretch and drew away to win by five lengths.

=== 2025: three-year-old season ===
Sovereignty was rested until March, when Godolphin and Mott entered him in the three-year-old Kentucky Derby prep races at Gulfstream Park in Florida.

His first race of 2025 was the Grade II Fountain of Youth Stakes, in which he again trailed the field before moving up around the turn and down the short stretch of Gulfstream's 1 1/16-mile racing configuration, defeating River Thames by a neck. The win gave Sovereignty 50 points in the 2025 Road to the Kentucky Derby.

Sovereignty then entered the Grade I Florida Derby with jockey Manuel Franco, who was substituting for regular rider Junior Alvarado after Alvarado was sidelined with a shoulder injury. He settled eighth out of the ten runners early and began to pass horses as the race progressed, but in the stretch he could not overtake eventual winner Tappan Street (also sired by Into Mischief). Sovereignty finished second, beaten by 1 1/4 lengths, but earned another 50 points, which was enough for him to qualify to enter "The Run for the Roses".

==== Kentucky Derby ====
Sovereignty drew post 18 in the 20-horse field for the Kentucky Derby and was made the 5–1 second choice on the morning line behind Santa Anita Derby winner Journalism. Junior Alvarado was aboard for the race.

On account of two scratches, Sovereignty broke from post 16. He bobbled after the gate break after Chunk Of Gold came in on him slightly from the adjacent starting position. Alvarado then settled Sovereignty down on the rail, where he was 16th as he and the 18 other horses ran through the stretch for the first time and into the clubhouse turn. Charted in 17th place with 1/2 mile remaining, Sovereignty began to pass horses while drifting five and six wide turning for home. He followed Journalism into the stretch and dueled with him until the final furlong, when he pulled away. Sovereignty won the Derby by 1 1/2 lengths in a time of 2:02.31 over the sloppy going. The Derby win was the first for Godolphin after twelve unsuccessful tries in the past and the first for jockey Alvarado. It was the second Derby victory for trainer Bill Mott, whose Country House was placed first in the 2019 Kentucky Derby after the disqualification of Maximum Security.

After the Derby, Alvarado acknowledged to the horse racing publication The Blood-Horse that he went over the limit of using his riding crop on Sovereignty's hindquarters, which is set by the Horseracing Integrity and Safety Authority (HISA) at six strikes. "I couldn't keep track of that... It's such a big race, there's so much that you've got on your mind," he said. "I wasn't galloping by 10 (lengths). When the extra whip happened, I was right next to the favorite (referring to Journalism) and I needed to do what I needed to do at the time," he added. "I just wanted to win the biggest race in America." About a week later, Churchill Downs stewards issued Alvarado a two-day suspension and fined him $62,000 (20% of his $310,000 purse winnings) for violating the HISA crop rule by striking eight times. The sanctions were double the usual penalty of a one-day suspension and the greater of 10% of the jockey's winnings or $250 because it was his second crop violation in the last 180 days. Alvarado appealed the ruling, which was stayed pending a hearing. It was later reported that the assessed penalties could be reduced due to a rule amendment that was awaiting approval by the Federal Trade Commission.

On May 6, it was reported that Bill Mott informed Preakness Stakes organizers that Sovereignty would not compete in the race in order to focus on the Belmont Stakes (June 7), thereby giving up the horse's chance at the Triple Crown.

==== Belmont Stakes ====
On June 7, 2025, Sovereignty won the Belmont Stakes, which had been moved to Saratoga Race Course because of construction at Belmont Park. With the victory, he became the first horse since Justify in 2018 to win at least two legs of the Triple Crown. He also became the first horse to win the Kentucky Derby and Belmont Stakes, but not the Preakness Stakes since Thunder Gulch in 1995. This feat would be repeated the following year with Golden Tempo.

==== Post-Triple Crown ====
Sovereignty followed his Belmont Stakes victory with two more graded stakes wins at Saratoga. In the Jim Dandy Stakes, he briefly lost the lead entering the stretch before rallying for a one-length victory. He followed this with a ten-length score against four other runners in the Grade I Travers Stakes, becoming the fifth horse in history to win the Kentucky Derby, Belmont Stakes, and Travers.

Sovereignty was established as the 6-5 morning line favorite for the Breeders' Cup Classic at Del Mar but was scratched three days before the race after he developed a fever.

=== 2026: four-year-old season ===
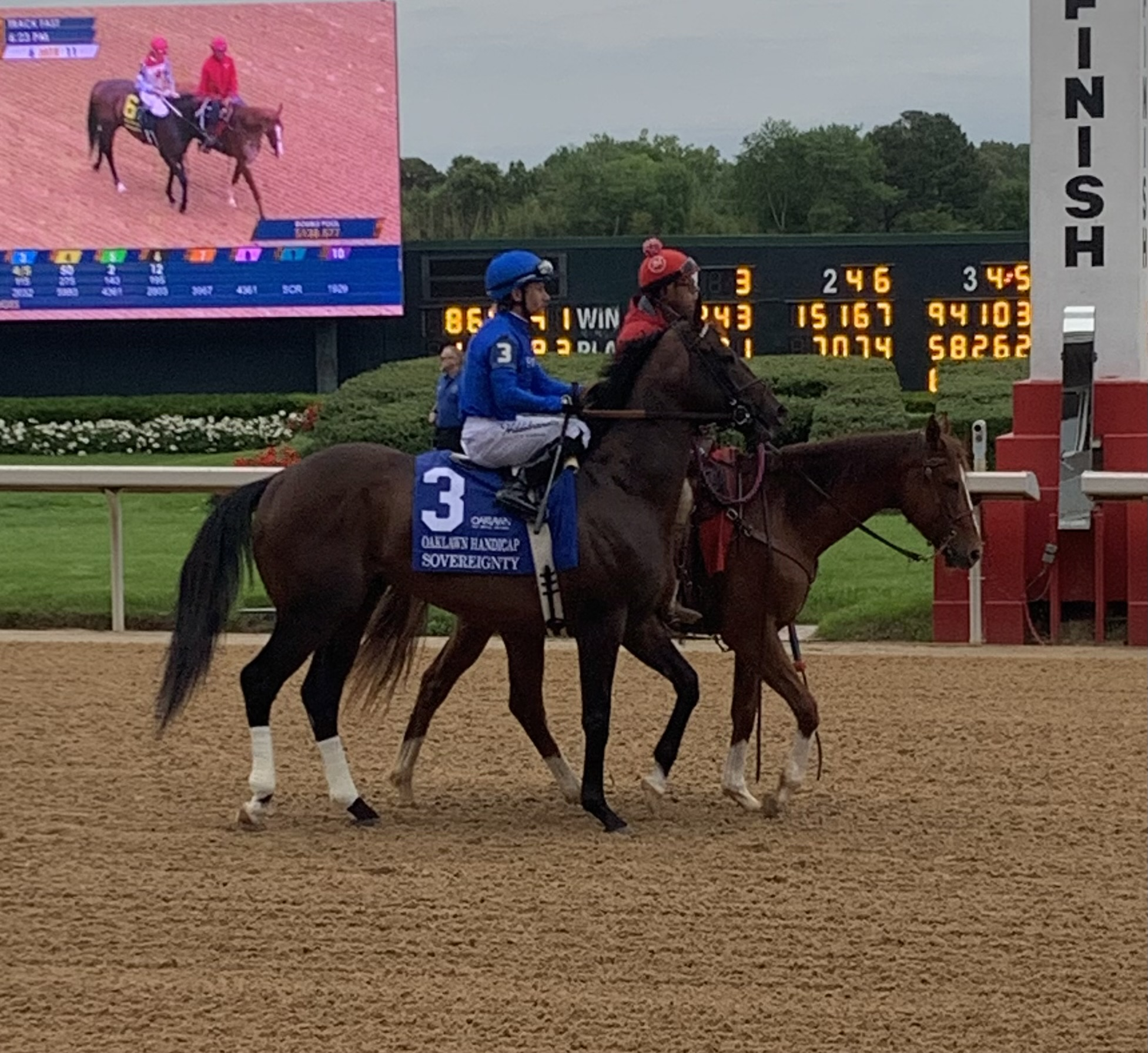
Sovereignty before the 2026 Oaklawn Handicap

Sovereignty's team aimed for the Grade II Oaklawn Handicap as his season debut. On April 18, 2026, the race was held at Oaklawn Park, with Sovereignty as the favorite. Uncharacteristically, he went to the front in the first turn, with Journalism and White Abarrio stalking him. On the final turn, White Abarrio overtook Sovereignty and Journalism, winning by 2 lengths. Sovereignty came in 2nd, with Journalism in 3rd.

After Sovereignty's defeat in the Oaklawn Handicap, the next race he aimed for was the Grade I Stephen Foster Stakes. He met Magnitude and Baeza there, two horses he had previously defeated. White Abarrio was there as well. Before the start of the race, Magnitude broke from the gate but was kept hold of by an assistant. He was examined, then quickly reloaded into the gate. At the start, Magnitude went to the front and led for the entire race. Sovereignty was not able to catch up and finished 3rd, behind Baeza and ahead of White Abarrio.

In August 2026, Sovereignty returned to the winner's circle in the Whitney Stakes at Saratoga, coming from off the pace in a seven-horse field to win by 4 3/4 lengths before a crowd of over 40,000.

It was then announced that he would be pointed towards the Jockey Club Gold Cup at Belmont Park in September. However, he was taken out of consideration one week prior to the race after developing a foot abscess. Mott said he would attempt to train the horse up to the Breeders' Cup Classic.

On October 31, he would make his final start in the Breeders' Cup Classic, which saw him defeat defending Classic winner Forever Young, 2026 Kentucky Derby/Belmont Stakes winner Golden Tempo, 2026 Preakness winner Napoleon Solo. With his victory in the Classic, he became the first horse to win two of the three legs of the American Triple Crown and then the Breeders' Cup Classic since Sunday Silence in 1989. He is also the first horse to do so in different years since Alysheba in 1987/1988.

After the race, Sovereignty retired to stud.

== Statistics ==
Date	Distance	Race	Grade / Group	Track	Odds	Field	Finish	Winning Time	Winning (Losing) Margin	Jockey	Reference
Aug 24, 2024	6 furlongs	Maiden Special Weight		Saratoga	11.20	10	4	1:10.46	(3 1/4 lengths)	Junior Alvarado	
Sep 27, 2024	1 mile	Maiden Special Weight		Aqueduct	2.45	6	2	1:36.14	(neck)	Junior Alvarado	
Oct 27, 2024	1 1/16 miles	Street Sense Stakes	III	Churchill Downs	1.43*	9	1	1:43.86	5 lengths	Junior Alvarado	
Mar 1, 2025	1 1/16 miles	Fountain of Youth Stakes	II	Gulfstream Park	3.20	6	1	1:43.12	neck	Junior Alvarado	
Mar 29, 2025	1 1/8 miles	Florida Derby	I	Gulfstream Park	1.70*	10	2	1:49.27	(1 1/4 lengths)	Manuel Franco	
May 3, 2025	1 1/4 miles	Kentucky Derby	I	Churchill Downs	7.98	19	1	2:02.31	1 1/2 lengths	Junior Alvarado	
June 7, 2025	1 1/4 miles	Belmont Stakes	I	Saratoga	2.50	8	1	2:00.69	3 lengths	Junior Alvarado	
July 26, 2025	1 1/8 miles	Jim Dandy Stakes	II	Saratoga	0.50*	5	1	1:49.52	1 length	Junior Alvarado	
Aug 23, 2025	1 1/4 miles	Travers Stakes	I	Saratoga	0.30*	5	1	2:00.84	10 lengths	Junior Alvarado	
Apr 18, 2026	1 1/8 miles	Oaklawn Handicap	II	Oaklawn Park	0.90*	6	2	1:47.49	(2 lengths)	Junior Alvarado	
Jun 27, 2026	1 1/8 miles	Stephen Foster Stakes	I	Churchill Downs	0.89*	5	3	1:48.03	(5 1/4 lengths)	Junior Alvarado	
Aug 8, 2026	1 1/8 miles	Whitney Stakes	I	Saratoga	2.26	7	1	1:47.91	4 3/4 lengths	Junior Alvarado	
Oct 31, 2026	1 1/4 miles	Breeders' Cup Classic	I	Keeneland	1.97	7	1	2:00.36	1 3/4 lengths	Junior Alvarado	

An (*) asterisk after the odds means Sovereignty was the post-time favorite.

== Stud career ==
Following the Breeders' Cup, Darley announced that Sovereignty's stud fee for 2027 will be $150,000.

== Pedigree ==
Pedigree of Sovereignty, bay colt, February 22, 2022
Sire Into Mischief (2005)	Harlan's Holiday (1999)	Harlan (1989)	Storm Cat (1983)
Sire Into Mischief (2005)	Harlan's Holiday (1999)	Harlan (1989)	Country Romance (1976)
Sire Into Mischief (2005)	Harlan's Holiday (1999)	Christmas in Aiken (1992)	Affirmed (1975)
Sire Into Mischief (2005)	Harlan's Holiday (1999)	Christmas in Aiken (1992)	Dowager (1980)
Sire Into Mischief (2005)	Leslie's Lady (1996)	Tricky Creek (1986)	Clever Trick (1976)
Sire Into Mischief (2005)	Leslie's Lady (1996)	Tricky Creek (1986)	Battle Creek Girl (1977)
Sire Into Mischief (2005)	Leslie's Lady (1996)	Crystal Lady (1990)	Stop the Music (1970)
Sire Into Mischief (2005)	Leslie's Lady (1996)	Crystal Lady (1990)	One Last Bird (1980)
Dam Crowned (2013)	Bernardini (2003)	A.P. Indy (1989)	Seattle Slew* (1974)
Dam Crowned (2013)	Bernardini (2003)	A.P. Indy (1989)	Weekend Surprise (1980)
Dam Crowned (2013)	Bernardini (2003)	Cara Rafaela (1993)	Quiet American (1986)
Dam Crowned (2013)	Bernardini (2003)	Cara Rafaela (1993)	Oil Fable (1986)
Dam Crowned (2013)	Mushka (2005)	Empire Maker (2000)	Unbridled (1987)
Dam Crowned (2013)	Mushka (2005)	Empire Maker (2000)	Toussaud (1989)
Dam Crowned (2013)	Mushka (2005)	Sluice (1998)	Seeking The Gold (1985)
Dam Crowned (2013)	Mushka (2005)	Sluice (1998)	Lakeway* (1991)(family: 9-f)

- Sovereignty is inbred 4D x 5D to Seattle Slew, meaning he appears twice in the fourth and fifth generation (via Lakeway) on the dam side of his pedigree.
