= Practical Joke (horse) =

American-bred Thoroughbred racehorse

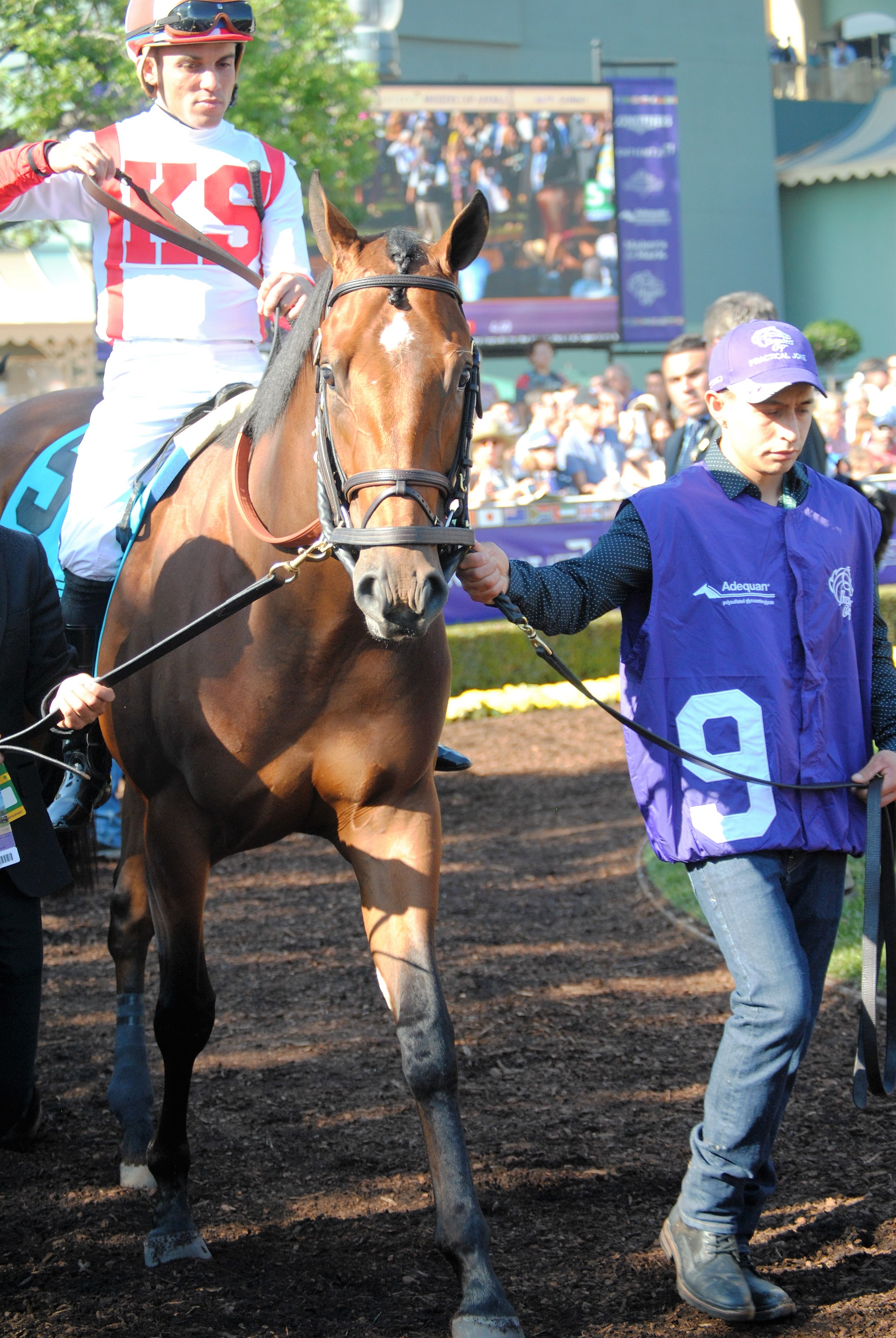
- Practical Joke at the 2016 Breeders' Cup Juvenile
- Sire: Into Mischief
- Grandsire: Harlan's Holiday
- Dam: Halo Humor
- Damsire: Distorted Humor
- Sex: Stallion
- Foaled: April 15, 2014 (age 11)
- Country: United States
- Color: Bay
- Breeder: Whispering Oaks
- Owner: Klaravich Stables and William Lawrence
- Trainer: Chad C. Brown
- Record: 12: 5–2–3
- Earnings: $1,795,800

Major wins
- Hopeful Stakes (2016); Champagne Stakes (2016); Dwyer Stakes (2017); H. Allen Jerkens Memorial Stakes (2017)

Practical Joke (foaled April 15, 2014 in Kentucky) is a retired multiple Grade I-winning American Thoroughbred racehorse whose wins included the Hopeful, Champagne and H. Allen Jerkens Memorial Stakes.

== Background ==
Practical Joke is a bay stallion with a star and no other white markings who was bred in Kentucky by Whispering Oaks. He is from the fifth crop of foals by Into Mischief, a stakes winning son of Harlan's Holiday and out of Leslie's Lady, who later produced champion Beholder. Into Mischief originally stood for only $12,500, but his profile increased when he sired two-time Breeders' Cup Dirt Mile winner Goldencents. Practical Joke is the fourth foal out of the stakes placed mare Halo Humor, by Distorted Humor. He was sold twice as a yearling in 2015, first in the Keeneland January mixed sale for $135,000 and then at the Keeneland September sale for $240,000.

== Racing career ==
=== 2016: two-year-old season ===
Practical Joke started his career in a 6-furlong Maiden Special Weight at Saratoga on August 6. He was sent off as the 12/5 favorite ridden by Irad Ortiz Jr. Leaving the gate, he bumped with another horse and was near the back of the pack down the backstretch. He went wide on the turn and started to close quickly on the early leaders, then drew away in the stretch to win by 5 lengths.

He then entered the Hopeful Stakes on September 9 where he was the 2-1 second choice in a field of six behind Classic Empire. Ridden by José Ortiz, he settled at the back of the pack behind a slow early pace, then swung wide around the turn. In the stretch, he battled with Royal Copy and Pretty Boy Flash but inched away late in the final furlong to win by a neck. Ortiz said after the race, "He was running the whole way. He gave me a great turn of foot when I got him in the clear but the other two horses were in front and they kept fighting a little bit. As soon as he put a head in front, he kept going."

The win was particularly satisfying for trainer Chad Brown, a trainer with a good reputation with fillies and turf horses, but who had never won a Grade I race with a colt on the dirt. "It's really a dream come true", said Brown. "I'm just so happy. What a great moment for me and my staff... It's been a pleasure to train him. That first race I thought he ran well and his second time here he also came back to run a huge race."

Practical Joke's final prep for the Breeders' Cup Juvenile was the Champagne Stakes at Belmont Park on October 8. He was the 5-2 second choice behind Syndergaard at 9–5. Now ridden by Joel Rosario, he broke awkwardly and ducked in toward the rail, then settled into mid-pack. He made his move around the turn and in the stretch he got even with Syndergaard and dueled down to the wire to win a head bobbing finish by a nose in a time of 1:34.68. It was the fourth fastest Champagne Stakes in the history of the race. Rosario stated after the race, "He kind of broke awkward on the inside and I had to use him a little through the chute. He was looking around and it took him a little time to get back in the race but he was fine after that. They were going really fast up front but it looks like the more distance he gets to run into the better he gets. For a second when I got to the other horse (Syndergaard) he waited a little bit. He's still a young horse if anything but looks good going forward."

The Breeders' Cup Juvenile was held at Santa Anita race track on November 5. Practical Joke was one of several horses at 7-1 odds in a highly competitive field of thirteen that included Grade I winners Klimt (Del Mar Futurity), Gormley (FrontRunner) and Classic Empire (Breeders' Futurity). At the break, Practical Joke bumped with Not This Time, then settled into mid pack. On the far turn, he angled to the outside and pulled into third place but finished over seven lengths behind Classic Empire and Not This Time.

=== 2017: three-year-old season ===
Practical Joke began the year as one of the top-ranked colts for the 2017 Kentucky Derby, although concerns were expressed about the lack of stamina influences in his pedigree. He made his first start of 2017 in the Fountain of Youth Stakes on March 4 at Gulfstream Park. After settling in the middle of the pack during the early running, Practical Joke moved to the lead around the far turn but was passed in the stretch by Gunnevera. Brown was happy with the performance, believing Practical Joke needed the race.

Practical Joke made his next start in the Blue Grass Stakes on April 8 at Keeneland racetrack. He made a sustained drive down the stretch and finished three-quarters of a length behind longshot Irap, with highly regarded McCraken three lengths behind in third. Despite concerns over Practical Joke's stamina, Brown was cautiously optimistic about the colt's prospects in the Derby. "Maybe this is a year that we want to take a shot because we have a horse that has the points [earned in the 2017 Road to the Kentucky Derby], and he did sustain his run."

The Kentucky Derby was held on May 6 over a wet-fast track at Churchill Downs. Practical Joke drew post position 19, and Rosario guided him over to the rail to save ground around the first turn. In the final turn, Practical Joke moved to the outside and made a strong run to advance to fourth in mid-stretch before tiring slightly and finishing fifth. Brown was pleased by the effort, saying, "He got a great trip from that post...He's a very fine racehorse. He just can't go that far. But he was fighting and trying."

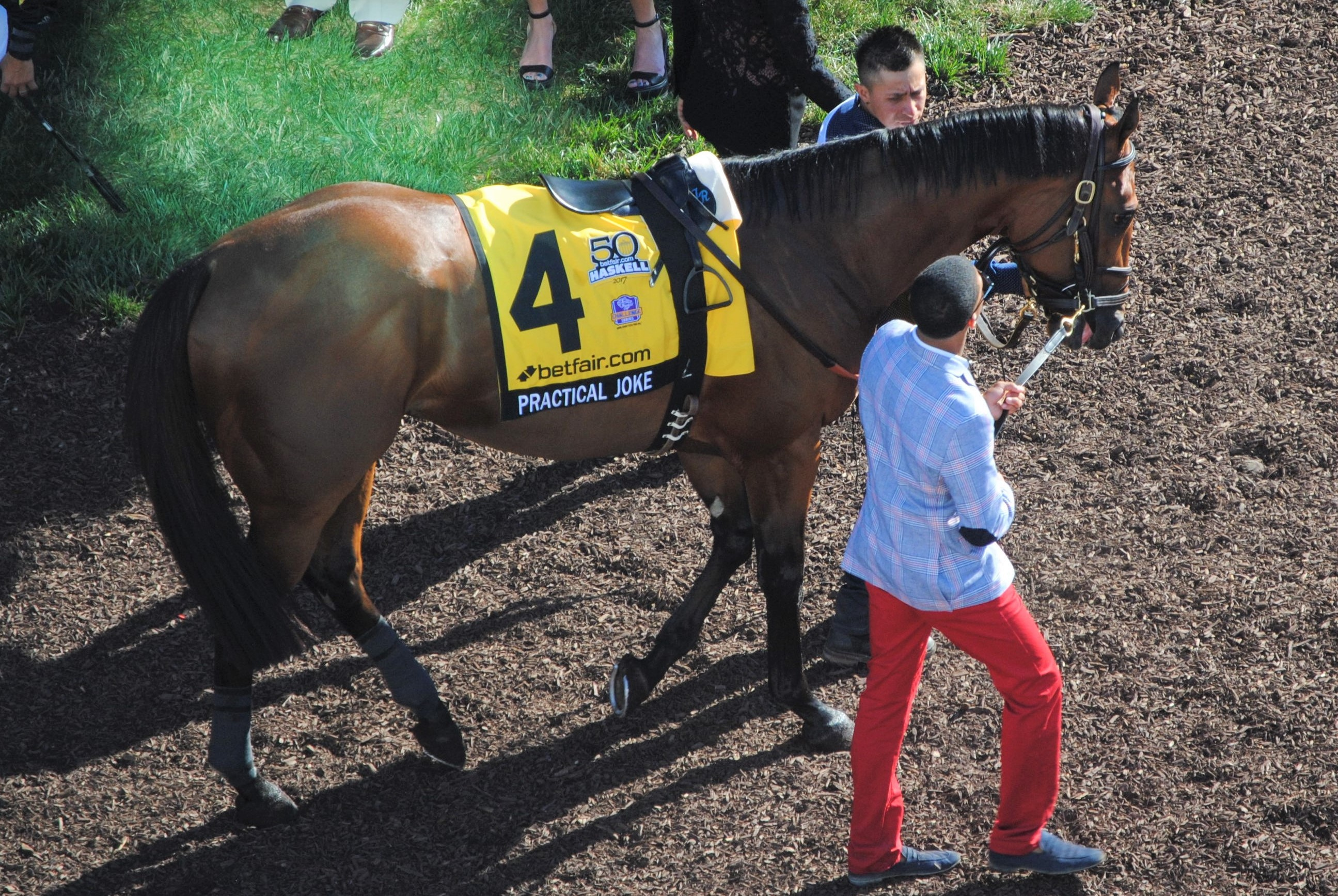
Practical Joke in the walking ring before the 2017 Haskell Invitational at Monmouth Park

Brown gave the colt a layoff, then entered him in the Dwyer Stakes at Belmont Park on July 8, where he was made the 4-5 favorite. Practical Joke rated in fourth behind the early pacemakers but was trapped on the inside as they entered the stretch. Swung wide by Rosario, he found racing room and quickly pulled away to win by two lengths. Brown was pleased. "He really ran well today. I certainly think it's the best race he's ever won."

On July 30, Practical Joke made his next start in the Haskell Invitational at Monmouth Park where he faced a field that included old rival McCraken, Belmont Stakes runner-up Irish War Cry, and Santa Anita Derby winner Girvin. After being bumped at the start, he rated in the middle of the pack trailed by McCraken and Girvin. Turning into the stretch, McCraken made his move and opened a one-length lead while Practical Joke and Girvin started closing ground on the outside. In a photo finish, Girvin prevailed over McCraken by a nose with Practical Joke half a length behind in third.

On August 26, Practical Joke started in the H. Allen Jerkens Memorial Stakes at Saratoga Race Course. He drew post 1 and again was ridden by Rosario. He broke well and settled towards the rear of the field as Takaful set the pace. Rosario started asking Practical Joke to go around the final turn, and he unleashed a sustained rally, winning by 1 1/4 lengths with a time of 1:21.96 for seven furlongs. With the win, Practical Joke earned the third grade one victory of his career. Brown stated after the race: "To cut back all the way to seven-eighths after a tough race in the Haskell, I'm so proud of this horse. It was his third race in seven weeks. He's our iron horse."

Practical Joke made his next start in the Breeders' Cup Dirt Mile at Del Mar on November 3, where he drew the outside post position, a major disadvantage in a two-turn mile. He broke slowly and was angled sharply over to the rail to save ground on the first turn. Down the backstretch, he raced near the back of the field, then started to make up position around the second turn. With a quarter of a mile remaining, he was swung wide and closed down the stretch, finishing fourth.

Practical Joke's final start was in the Cigar Mile on December 2 at Aqueduct. He settled at the back of the pack, over 12 lengths behind a fast early pace. Around the far turn, he moved wide and circled the field to make up ground and finish well back in third behind Sharp Azteca and Mind Your Biscuits. "It was hard to make up ground today on this track," commented Brown. "That said, the winner was very impressive, and I don't think it would have mattered how the track was playing; it looked like nobody was going to beat him today."

== Statistics ==
Date	Distance	Race	Grade	Track	Odds	Field	Finish	Winning Time	Winning (Losing) Margin	Jockey	Ref
2016 – Two-year-old season
Aug 6, 2016	6 1/2 furlongs	Maiden Special Weight		Saratoga	2.40*	10	1	1:10.02	5 lengths	Irad Ortiz Jr.	
Sep 5, 2016	7 furlongs	Hopeful Stakes	I	Saratoga	2.10	7	1	1:23.39	neck	Irad Ortiz Jr.	
Oct 8, 2016	1 mile	Champagne Stakes	I	Belmont Park	2.95	6	1	1:34.68	nose	Joel Rosario	
Nov 5, 2016	1 1/16 miles	Breeders' Cup Juvenile	I	Santa Anita	7.80	11	3	1:42.60	(7 1/2 lengths)	Joel Rosario	
2017 – Three-year-old season
Mar 4, 2017	1 1/16 miles	Fountain of Youth Stakes	II	Gulfstream Park	3.40	10	2	1:44.25	(5 3/4 lengths)	Jose Ortiz	
Apr 8, 2017	1 1/8 miles	Blue Grass Stakes	II	Keeneland	3.60	7	2	1:50.39	(3/4 length)	Joel Rosario	
May 6, 2017	1 1/4 miles	Kentucky Derby	I	Churchill Downs	27.80	20	5	2:03.59	(9 1/2 lengths)	Joel Rosario	
Jul 7, 2017	1 mile	Dwyer Stakes	III	Belmont Park	0.75*	5	1	1:35.16	2 lengths	Joel Rosario	
Jul 30, 2017	1 1/8 miles	Haskell Invitational	I	Monmouth Park	4.40	7	3	1:48.35	(1/2 length)	Joel Rosario	
Aug 27, 2017	7 furlongs	H. Allen Jerkens Stakes	I	Saratoga	2.00*	9	1	1:21.96	1 1/4 lengths	Joel Rosario	
Nov 3, 2017	1 mile	Breeders' Cup Dirt Mile	I	Del Mar	5.80	10	4	1:35.20	(5 1/4 lengths)	Joel Rosario	
Dec 2, 2017	1 mile	Cigar Mile Handicap	I	Aqueduct	2.85	10	3	1:35.17	(8 lengths)	Joel Rosario	

Source: Equibase Charts

== Retirement ==
After his win in the Allen Jerkens, it was announced that his breeding rights were purchased by Ashford Stud (a division of the international operation Coolmore Stud). He was retired after the Cigar Mile, and his stud fee for 2018 was set at $30,000. In 2022, his stud fee was set at $35,000 and that year his first offspring won a Grade I event in the United States when Chocolate Gelato was victorious in the Frizette Stakes at Aqueduct Racetrack.

=== Notable progeny ===
His major stakes winners include: c = colt, f = filly, g = gelding

Foaled	Name	Sex	Major Wins
2019	Berberisca (CHI)	f	Alberto Solari Magnasco (Chile) (CHI)
2019	El Oriante (CHI)	c	Tanteo de Potrillos (CHI)
2019	Joke Sisi (CHI)	f	Clásico Mil Guineas (CHI)
2019	Mbagnick (CHI)	c	Gran Criterium (Chile) (CHI)
2020	Chocolate Gelato	f	Frizette Stakes
2020	Practical Move	c	Santa Anita Derby
2020	Richi (CHI)	f	Tanteo de Potrancas (Chile) (CHI)
2020	Soqui (CHI)	c	Tanteo de Potrillos (Chile) (CHI)
2021	Domestic Product	c	H. Allen Jerkens Memorial Stakes
2021	Ways and Means	f	Test Stakes, Ballerina Stakes, Breeders' Cup Filly & Mare Sprint

== Pedigree ==
Pedigree of Practical Joke, bay colt, 2014
Sire Into Mischief 2005	Harlan's Holiday; 1999	Harlan	Storm Cat
Sire Into Mischief 2005	Harlan's Holiday; 1999	Harlan	Country Romance
Sire Into Mischief 2005	Harlan's Holiday; 1999	Christmas In Aiken	Affirmed
Sire Into Mischief 2005	Harlan's Holiday; 1999	Christmas In Aiken	Dowager
Sire Into Mischief 2005	Leslie's Lady; 1996	Tricky Creek	Clever Trick
Sire Into Mischief 2005	Leslie's Lady; 1996	Tricky Creek	Battle Creek Girl
Sire Into Mischief 2005	Leslie's Lady; 1996	Crystal Lady	Stop the Music
Sire Into Mischief 2005	Leslie's Lady; 1996	Crystal Lady	One Last Bird
Dam Halo Humor 2003	Distorted Humor; 1993	Forty Niner	Mr. Prospector
Dam Halo Humor 2003	Distorted Humor; 1993	Forty Niner	File
Dam Halo Humor 2003	Distorted Humor; 1993	Danzig's Beauty	Danzig
Dam Halo Humor 2003	Distorted Humor; 1993	Danzig's Beauty	Sweetest Chant
Dam Halo Humor 2003	Gilded Halo; 1996	Gilded Time	Timeless Moment
Dam Halo Humor 2003	Gilded Halo; 1996	Gilded Time	Gilded Lilly
Dam Halo Humor 2003	Gilded Halo; 1996	Careless Halo	Sunny's Halo
Dam Halo Humor 2003	Gilded Halo; 1996	Careless Halo	Careless Moment (family: A4)

Practical Joke is inbred 5 x 5 to Halo, meaning Halo appears twice in the fifth generation of Practical Joke's pedigree.
