= Into Mischief =

American Thoroughbred racehorse and sire

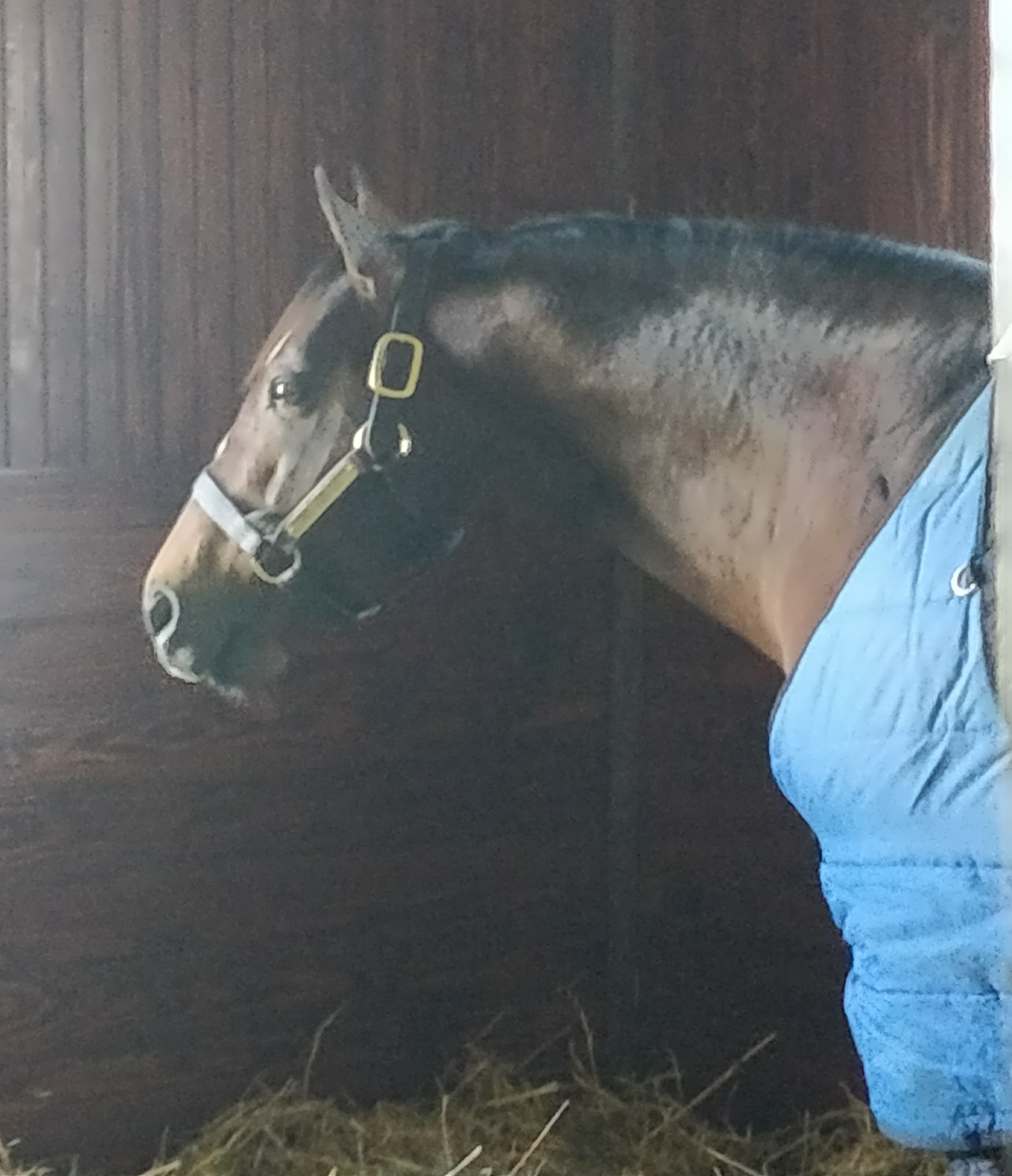
- Into Mischief at Spendthrift Farm
- Sire: Harlan's Holiday
- Grandsire: Harlan
- Dam: Leslie's Lady
- Damsire: Tricky Creek
- Sex: Stallion
- Foaled: March 28, 2005 (age 21)
- Country: United States
- Color: Bay
- Breeder: James T. Hines Jr.
- Owner: B. Wayne Hughes
- Trainer: Richard Mandella
- Record: 6: 3-3-0
- Earnings: $597,080

Major wins
- CashCall Futurity (2007); Damascus Stakes (2008)

Awards
- Leading sire in North America (2019, 2020, 2021, 2022, 2023, 2024, 2025)

Into Mischief (foaled March 28, 2005) is a retired American Thoroughbred racehorse and active sire. During his racing career, he won three of six starts including the CashCall Futurity. Since his retirement, he has developed into an outstanding sire, leading the North American sire list in 2019, 2020, 2021, 2022, 2023, 2024 and 2025. His offspring include Authentic (2020 American Horse of the Year), Mandaloun (2021 Kentucky Derby), Life Is Good (Breeders' Cup Dirt Mile), Covfefe (female sprint Champion) and Sovereignty (2025 Kentucky Derby and Belmont Stakes).

== Background ==
Into Mischief was bred in Kentucky by James T. Hines Jr. He was from the first crop of Harlan's Holiday, a Grade I-winning grandson of Storm Cat. Into Mischief was one of the first foals out of Leslie's Lady, a stakes-winning daughter of Tricky Creek. Leslie's Lady later produced multiple Eclipse Award winner Beholder and Grade I winner Mendelssohn, and was named the 2016 Kentucky Broodmare of the Year. She comes from a distinguished female family that also produced dual Classic winner I'll Have Another.

Into Mischief was sold as a yearling at the Fasig-Tipton Fall Sale for $80,000 to Gage Hill Stable. He was re-sold as a two-year-old in training at the Ocala Breeders' Sale for $180,000 to B. Wayne Hughes, the owner of Spendthrift Farm. He was trained by Richard Mandella.

== Racing career ==
=== 2007: two-year-old season ===
Into Mischief made his first start on October 21, 2007, in a 6 1/2-furlong maiden race at the Oak Tree meeting at Santa Anita. He dueled for the early lead with Bazzoom, running a fast opening quarter mile of 21.87 seconds. Bazoom dropped back on the turn, eventually finishing eleventh. Into Mischief continued to open up his lead under mild urging and won by 2 1/2 lengths. He finished second in his next start, the Hollywood Prevue Stakes at Hollywood Park on November 22. He got involved in a three-way duel for the lead on the outside of Massive Drama and Sky Cape, who tired after a half mile and finished tenth. Into Mischief got to within a head of Massive Drama in midstretch, but the latter rallied to win by 1 3/4 lengths.

Into Mischief finished his two-year-old campaign by winning the CashCall Futurity at Hollywood Park on December 22. In his first "two-turn" race at a distance of 1 1/16 miles, his main rivals were Colonel John, favored at 2–1, and Massive Drama at 3–1. Into Mischief was a relative longshot at 14–1. He raced just off the early pace set by Eaton's Gift, who tired on the far turn and finished seventh. Into Mischief took over the lead at the head of the stretch and won comfortably by 1 1/2 over a late-closing Colonel John. Mandella said that the colt "put it all together today", and Hughes had thoughts of winning his first Kentucky Derby. "Maybe this horse will be the one."

=== 2008: three-year-old season ===
Into Mischief started his three-year-old campaign in the San Vicente Stakes at Santa Anita on February 10, 2008, dropping back in distance to seven furlongs. His training for the race had been interrupted when Santa Anita was shut down several times because a newly installed synthetic dirt surface failed to drain properly after heavy rains. Despite this, he went off as the 7-5 favorite in a four horse field that also included Massive Drama and Georgie Boy, winner of the Del Mar Futurity. Into Mischief and Massive Drama vied for the early lead, running the first half mile in :45.27. Into Mischief started to edge away in the stretch but shied when jockey Victor Espinoza went to the whip, briefly shifting leads. He was caught by Georgie Boy, who drew off to win by 3 1/4 lengths. "I was lucky to get him to the races," said Mandella, referring to the interrupted training, "but we got through that and at least we're still in the game."

Despite the loss, Into Mischief was still a highly ranked contender for the 2008 Kentucky Derby. Sportswriter Steve Haskin noted the colt's athleticism and said, "the race served as a good comeback performance that should set him up well for a return to two-turn races." However, Into Mischief developed an abscess in his left hind hoof and missed several weeks of training, taking him off the Triple Crown trail.

He returned to racing on October 25 in the 7-furlong Damascus Stakes, part of the undercard for the 2008 Breeders' Cup held at Santa Anita. The favorite was Georgie Boy at 7–5 with Into Mischief the second choice at 3–1. Into Mischief broke slowly and settled in fifth place along the rail. Rounding the turn he shifted to the outside and began to make up ground. Under a hand ride, he drew off to win by two lengths over Dancing in Silks (who would win the Breeders' Cup Sprint in 2009) with Georgie Boy well back in fourth.

Into Mischief made his final start in the seven furlong Malibu Stakes on December 26 at Santa Anita. He was the favorite in a seven-horse field that also included Colonel John (Santa Anita Derby, Travers Stakes), Bob Black Jack (Sunshine Millions Dash), Nownownow (Breeders' Cup Juvenile Turf) and Georgie Boy. Bob Black Jack, who had set a world record for six furlongs earlier in the year, went to the early lead and was never headed, winning by 2 1/4 lengths. Into Mischief sat back in fifth place during the first half mile, then maneuvered for position and closed late to finish second.

Into Mischief finished his career with three wins and three seconds from six starts, and earnings of $597,080.

=== Racing statistics ===
Date	Age	Distance	Race	Grade	Track	Odds	Field	Finish	Winning time	Winning (losing) margin	Jockey	Ref
Oct 21, 2007	2	6 1/2 furlongs	Maiden Special Weight	Maiden	Oak Tree at Santa Anita	4.20	13	1	1:14.36	2 1/2 lengths	Victor Espinoza	
Nov 22, 2007	2	7 furlongs	Hollywood Prevue Stakes	III	Hollywood Park	2.20*	11	2	1:21.48	(1 3/4 lengths)	Victor Espinoza	
Dec 22, 2007	2	1 1/16 miles	CashCall Futurity	I	Hollywood Park	13.80	12	1	1:40.82	1 1/4 lengths	Victor Espinoza	
Feb 10, 2008	3	7 furlongs	San Vicente Stakes	II	Santa Anita	1.10*	4	2	1:20.01	(3 1/4 lengths)	Victor Espinoza	
Oct 25, 2008	3	7 furlongs	Damascus Stakes	listed	Oak Tree at Santa Anita	3.40	11	1	1:20.38	2 lengths	Victor Espinoza	
Dec 26, 2008	3	7 furlongs	Malibu Stakes	I	Santa Anita	2.20*	7	2	1:20.20	(2 1/4 lengths)	Victor Espinoza	

An asterisk after the odds means Into Mischief was the post-time favorite.

== Retirement ==
Into Mischief was retired to stud at Spendthrift Farm for a fee of $12,500 for the 2009 season. In order to build support, Hughes offered a lifetime breeding right to breeders who completed "stands and nurses" contracts in each of his first two years at stud. Interest in him was moderate, and his stud fee dropped to $7,500 by 2012.

Into Mischief's first crop reached racing age in 2012. His first winner was Avalon Rose, who won a five-furlong maiden race on July 5. His first stakes winner was Goldencents, who won the Delta Downs Jackpot Stakes. From a small crop that contained just 21 starters, Into Mischief finished third on the North American first-crop sire list. Two members of his first crop, Goldencents and Vyjack, were starters in the 2013 Kentucky Derby. Commenting on Into Mischief's unexpected success at stud, Hughes said "We don't really know what we have. We might have Mr. Prospector; it's not knowing."

With the on-track success of that first crop, Into Mischief began to attract more recognition. The crop he sired in 2013 reached racing age in 2016 and started to move Into Mischief steadily up the North American stallion ranks. In 2018, Audible became his first offspring to be in the money in a Triple Crown race, finishing third in the Kentucky Derby. In 2019, Into Mischief was the leading sire in North America, with Eclipse Award-winning filly Covfefe being his leading performer. His offspring are generally known as sprinters, although his more recent crops contain horses who are able to contend at longer distances. Authentic became his first Classic winner in the 2020 Kentucky Derby. Into Mischief was again the leading sire in North America in 2020 with record progeny earnings of over $22 million.

In 2021, his offspring Mandaloun finished second in the 2021 Kentucky Derby and was later declared the winner after Medina Spirit was disqualified in February 2022 due to a positive drug test. Into Mischief led the North American sire list for the third straight year, breaking his own progeny earnings record in the process. His stud fee for 2022 was set at $250,000. He earned his fourth straight earnings title in 2022, again breaking his earnings record. As of the 2026 breeding season, his stud fee remained at $250,000.

=== Stallion statistics ===
By Racing Year
Year	North American rank	Runners	Winners	Black-type winners	Graded stakes winners	Chief earner	Earnings
2012	#3 first-crop	21	8	3	1	Goldencents	$1,171,578
2013	#4 second-crop	48	27	7	2	Goldencents	$3,383,675
2014	#4 third-crop	65	41	9	4	Vicar's In Trouble	$4,517,318
2015	#105	79	45	5	3	Strict Compliance	$2,781,698
2016	#34	166	85	8	3	Practical Joke	$5,620,800
2017	#11	274	158	18	4	Practical Joke	$10,669,719
2018	#4	330	180	18	8	Audible	$13,881,207
2019	#1	379	218	23	6	Covfefe	$18,916,923
2020	#1	413	189	29	12	Authentic	$22,071,223 (Note: New record for North American sires)
2021	#1	444	259	29	13	Mandaloun	$24,411,267 (Note: Broke own earnings record. The amount shown, using The Blood-Horse's earnings data on January 1, 2022, does not include any purse redistribution resulting from Mandaloun being declared the winner of the 2021 Kentucky Derby in February 2022)
2022	#1	473	235	27	17	Life Is Good	$28,568,753
2023	#1	460	210	27	14	Pretty Mischievous	$25,658,000
2024	#1	476	251	36	17	Laurel River	$34,607,042 (Note: New earnings record.)
2025	#1	449	222	27	17	Sovereignty	$31,863,395

=== Notable progeny ===
His Grade I stakes winners include:

c = colt, f = filly, g = gelding

Foaled	Name	Sex	Major wins
2010	Goldencents	c	2013 Santa Anita Derby, Breeders' Cup Dirt Mile, 2014 Breeders' Cup Dirt Mile
2014	Practical Joke	c	2016 Champagne Stakes, Hopeful Stakes, 2017 H. Allen Jerkens Memorial Stakes
2015	Audible	c	2018 Florida Derby. Third in 2018 Kentucky Derby
2015	Mia Mischief	f	2019 Derby City Distaff
2016	Covfefe	f	2019 Champion three-year-old filly and Champion female sprinter. Test Stakes, Breeders' Cup Filly & Mare Sprint
2017	Gamine	f	2020 Champion female sprinter. Acorn Stakes, Test Stakes, Breeders' Cup Filly & Mare Sprint. 2021 Derby City Distaff, Ballerina Stakes
2017	Authentic	c	2020 Horse of the Year and Champion three-year-old colt. 2020 Kentucky Derby, Haskell Invitational Stakes, Breeders' Cup Classic. Second in 2020 Preakness Stakes
2017	Mischevious Alex	c	2021 Carter Handicap
2017	Atone	g	2023 Pegasus World Cup Turf Invitational
2018	Dayoutoftheoffice	f	2020 Frizette Stakes. Second in Breeders' Cup Juvenile Fillies
2018	Life Is Good	c	2021 Breeders' Cup Dirt Mile, 2022 Pegasus World Cup, Whitney Stakes, Woodward Stakes
2018	Mandaloun	c	2021 Haskell Stakes, 2021 Kentucky Derby
2018	Played Hard	f	2023 La Troienne Stakes
2018	Laurel River	c	2024 Dubai World Cup
2019	Doppelganger	c	2023 Carter Handicap
2019	Gina Romantica	f	2022 Queen Elizabeth II Challenge Cup, 2023 & 2024 First Lady Stakes
2020	Wonder Wheel	f	2022 Champion two-year-old filly. Alcibiades Stakes, Breeders' Cup Juvenile Fillies
2020	Pretty Mischievous	f	2023 Champion three-year-old filly. Kentucky Oaks, Acorn Stakes, Test Stakes
2020	Newgate	c	2024 Santa Anita Handicap
2021	Leslie's Rose	f	2024 Ashland Stakes, 2025 Shuvee Stakes
2021	Timberlake	c	2023 Champagne Stakes
2022	Citizen Bull	c	2024 Champion two-year-old colt. American Pharoah Stakes, Breeders' Cup Juvenile. Second in 2025 Breeders' Cup Dirt Mile
2022	Tappan Street	c	2025 Florida Derby
2022	Sovereignty	c	2025 Horse of the Year and Champion three-year-old colt. Travers Stakes, 2025 Kentucky Derby, 2025 Belmont Stakes, 2026 Whitney Stakes, 2026 Breeders' Cup Classic
2022	Patch Adams	c	2025 Woody Stephens Stakes, H. Allen Jerkens Memorial Stakes
2022	Eclatant	f	2026 Madison Stakes
2022	Shred the Gnar	f	2026 La Troienne Stakes
2023	Tommy Jo	f	2025 Spinaway Stakes, Alcibiades Stakes
2023	Ted Noffey	c	2025 Champion two-year-old colt. Hopeful Stakes, Breeders' Futurity Stakes, Breeders' Cup Juvenile
2023	Commandment	c	2026 Florida Derby. Second in 2026 Belmont Stakes
2023	Renegade	c	2026 Arkansas Derby. Second in 2026 Kentucky Derby, third in 2026 Belmont Stakes
2024	Hughes	c	2026 Del Mar Futurity, American Pharoah Stakes, Breeders' Cup Juvenile

Into Mischief is the grandsire/damsire of Grade I winners and millionaires:

Name	Foaled	Sex	Sire	Damsire	Major wins
By My Standards	2016	c	Goldencents	Muqtarib	2019 Louisiana Derby, 2020 Alysheba Stakes, New Orleans Classic Stakes, Oaklawn Handicap, 2021 Oaklawn Mile Stakes
Mr. Money	2016	c	Goldencents	Tiznow	2019 West Virginia Derby, Indiana Derby, Pat Day Mile Stakes, Matt Winn Stakes, 2020 Ack Ack Stakes
Going To Vegas	2017	f	Goldencents	Johannesburg	2021, 2022 Rodeo Drive Stakes
White Abarrio	2019	c	Race Day	Into Mischief	2022 Florida Derby, 2023 Breeders' Cup Classic, Whitney Stakes, 2025 Pegasus World Cup Invitational Stakes
Joke Sisi (CHI)	2019	f	Practical Joke	Lookin At Lucky	2022 Mil Guineas Maria Luisa Solari Falabella (Gr. I)
Mbagnick (CHI)	2019	c	Practical Joke	Powerscourt	2022 Gran Criterium Mauricio Serrano P. (Gr. I)
El Oriente (CHI)	2019	g	Practical Joke	Scat Daddy	2022 Tanteo de Potrillos (Gr. I)
Berberisca (CHI)	2019	f	Practical Joke	Scat Daddy	Gr. I win in South America
Practical Move	2020	c	Practical Joke	Afleet Alex	2023 Santa Anita Derby
Chocolate Gelato	2020	f	Practical Joke	Candy Ride	2022 Frizette Stakes
Richi (CHI)	2020	f	Practical Joke	Scat Daddy	2023 Tanteo de Potrancas (Gr. I), Alberto Solari Magnasco (Gr. I)
Ionosfera (CHI)	2020	f	Practical Joke	Galileo	Gr. I win in South America
Soqui	2020	c	Practical Joke	Scat Daddy	Gr. I win in South America
Alva Starr	2020	f	Lord Nelson	Into Mischief	2024 Madison Stakes
Positano Sunset	2020	f	Goldencents	Consolidator	2025 Madison Stakes
Mystik Dan	2021	c	Goldencents	Colonel John	2024 Kentucky Derby
Ways and Means	2021	f	Practical Joke	Warrior's Reward	2024 Test Stakes, 2026 Breeders' Cup Filly & Mare Sprint, Ballerina StakesBallerina Stakes
Domestic Product	2021	c	Practical Joke	Paynter	2024 H. Allen Jerkens Memorial Stakes
Splendora	2021	f	Audible	Frost Giant	2025 Breeders' Cup Filly & Mare Sprint, 2026 Beholder Mile Stakes
My Mane Squeeze	2021	f	Audible	Speightstown	2024 Eight Belles Stakes, Dogwood Stakes
Raging Torrent	2021	c	Maximus Mischief	Violence	2024 Malibu Stakes, 2025 Metropolitan Handicap
Combativa (PR)	2021	f	Maximus Mischief	Tiznow	2024 Derby Puertorriqueno Stakes (Gr. I)
Shisospicy	2022	f	Mitole	Into Mischief	2025 Mamzelle Stakes, Music City Stakes, Breeders' Cup Turf Sprint
Troubleshooting	2022	c	Not This Time	Into Mischief	2025 Franklin-Simpson Stakes
Corsia Veloce (CAN)	2023	f	Practical Joke	City Zip	2025 Natalma Stakes
Intrepido	2023	c	Maximus Mischief	Pleasantly Perfect	2025 American Pharoah Stakes
Iron Orchard	2023	f	Authentic	Bethren	2025 Frizette Stakes
The Good Life	2024	c	Life Is Good	Speightstown	2026 Hopeful Stakes

== Pedigree ==
Pedigree of Into Mischief, bay horse, March 28, 2005
Sire Harlan's Holiday 1999	Harlan; 1989	Storm Cat	Storm Bird
Sire Harlan's Holiday 1999	Harlan; 1989	Storm Cat	Terlingua
Sire Harlan's Holiday 1999	Harlan; 1989	Country Romance	Halo
Sire Harlan's Holiday 1999	Harlan; 1989	Country Romance	Sweet Romance
Sire Harlan's Holiday 1999	Christmas in Aiken; 1992	Affirmed	Exclusive Native
Sire Harlan's Holiday 1999	Christmas in Aiken; 1992	Affirmed	Won't Tell You
Sire Harlan's Holiday 1999	Christmas in Aiken; 1992	Dowager	Honest Pleasure
Sire Harlan's Holiday 1999	Christmas in Aiken; 1992	Dowager	Princenesian
Dam Leslie's Lady 1996	Tricky Creek; 1986	Clever Trick	Icecapade
Dam Leslie's Lady 1996	Tricky Creek; 1986	Clever Trick	Kankakee Miss
Dam Leslie's Lady 1996	Tricky Creek; 1986	Battle Creek Girl	His Majesty
Dam Leslie's Lady 1996	Tricky Creek; 1986	Battle Creek Girl	Far Beyond
Dam Leslie's Lady 1996	Crystal Lady; 1990	Stop the Music	Hail To Reason
Dam Leslie's Lady 1996	Crystal Lady; 1990	Stop the Music	Bebopper
Dam Leslie's Lady 1996	Crystal Lady; 1990	One Last Bird	One for All
Dam Leslie's Lady 1996	Crystal Lady; 1990	One Last Bird	Last Bird (family: 23-b)
