= By My Standards =

American thoroughbred racehorse

- Sire: Goldencents
- Grandsire: Into Mischief
- Dam: A Jealous Woman
- Damsire: Muqtarib
- Sex: Colt
- Foaled: March 22, 2016
- Country: USA
- Breeder: Don Ladd
- Owner: Allied Racing Stable LLC
- Trainer: W. Bret Calhoun
- Jockey: Jose L. Ortiz
- Record: 15:7-4-1
- Earnings: $1,378,910

Major wins
- Louisiana Derby (2019); New Orleans Classic Stakes (2020); Oaklawn Handicap (2020); Alysheba Stakes (2020); Oaklawn Mile Stakes (2021)
- Last updated on July 29th, 2020

By My Standards (foaled March 22, 2016) is an American Thoroughbred racehorse and the winner of the 2019 Louisiana Derby and the 2020 Alysheba Stakes.

== Career ==
=== 2018: Two-year-old season ===
By My Standards's first race was on November 24, 2018, at Churchill Downs, where he came in second.

=== 2019: Three-year-old season ===
He did not pick up his first win until four races into his career, when he won a Maiden Special Weight race on February 16 at Fair Grounds Race Course.

On March 23, 2019, he scored an upset win at the 2019 Louisiana Derby. He came in at 22:1 odds and rallied in the stretch against Spinoff. The upset win gained him entry into the 2019 Kentucky Derby.

On May 4, 2019, he competed in the 2019 Kentucky Derby. He was placed at 18:1 odds going into the race, coming a disappointing 11th place. This was his final race of the 2019 season as he had hoof wall separation.

=== 2020: Four-year-old season ===
He returned on February 9, winning an Allowance Optional Claiming race at Fair Grounds.

On March 21, he won the Grade 2 New Orleans Handicap, defeating Warrior's Charge and Mr. Freeze.

He picked up another victory on May 2, winning the Grade 2 Oaklawn Handicap. He passed Warrior's Charge near the end of the race to win.

On June 27, he ran well but only came 2nd behind Tom's D'Etat in the Grade 2 Stephen Foster Stakes. W. Bret Calhoun, his trainer, said that Tom's d'Etat had surprised them with his performance and was not going to be beaten.

By My Standards returned on August 1 in the 2020 Whitney Stakes against Code of Honor, Improbable, and Tom's d'Etat. The favorite Tom's d'Etat stumbled coming out of the starting gate, and Improbable won the race and By My Standards came second.

He then won the 2020 Alysheba Stakes over McKinzie, Mr. Freeze, and Owendale. This was his third Grade 2 win of the year.

His next start is likely to be the 2020 Breeders' Cup Classic.

== Pedigree ==
Pedigree of By My Standards (USA), 2016
Sire Goldencents (USA) b. 2010	Into Mischief (USA) b. 2005	Harlan's Holiday	Harlan
Sire Goldencents (USA) b. 2010	Into Mischief (USA) b. 2005	Harlan's Holiday	Christmas in Aiken
Sire Goldencents (USA) b. 2010	Into Mischief (USA) b. 2005	Leslie's Lady	Tricky Creek
Sire Goldencents (USA) b. 2010	Into Mischief (USA) b. 2005	Leslie's Lady	Crystal Lady
Sire Goldencents (USA) b. 2010	Golden Works (CAN) b. 2000	Banker's Gold	Forty Niner
Sire Goldencents (USA) b. 2010	Golden Works (CAN) b. 2000	Banker's Gold	Bankers Lady
Sire Goldencents (USA) b. 2010	Golden Works (CAN) b. 2000	Body Works	Bold Ruckus
Sire Goldencents (USA) b. 2010	Golden Works (CAN) b. 2000	Body Works	Kinto
Dam A Jealous Woman (USA) b. 2006	Muqtarib (USA) b. 1996	Gone West	Mr. Prospector
Dam A Jealous Woman (USA) b. 2006	Muqtarib (USA) b. 1996	Gone West	Secrettame
Dam A Jealous Woman (USA) b. 2006	Muqtarib (USA) b. 1996	Shicklah	The Minstrel
Dam A Jealous Woman (USA) b. 2006	Muqtarib (USA) b. 1996	Shicklah	Logette
Dam A Jealous Woman (USA) b. 2006	Miss Free Bird (USA) b. 1998	Fly So Free	Time for a Change
Dam A Jealous Woman (USA) b. 2006	Miss Free Bird (USA) b. 1998	Fly So Free	Free to Fly
Dam A Jealous Woman (USA) b. 2006	Miss Free Bird (USA) b. 1998	Stormfeather	Storm Bird
Dam A Jealous Woman (USA) b. 2006	Miss Free Bird (USA) b. 1998	Stormfeather	Mazama
