= Improbable (horse) =

American thoroughbred racehorse

- Breed: Thoroughbred
- Sire: City Zip
- Grandsire: Carson City
- Dam: Rare Event
- Damsire: A.P. Indy
- Sex: Stallion
- Foaled: February 11, 2016
- Died: March 16, 2024
- Country: USA
- Colour: Chestnut
- Breeder: St. George Farm LLC & G. Watts Humphrey Jr.
- Owner: WinStar Farm LLC, China Horse Club's CHC Inc. and SF Racing LLC
- Trainer: Bob Baffert
- Record: 15: 7-4-0
- Earnings: $2,729,520

Major wins
- Los Alamitos Futurity (2018); Shared Belief Stakes (2019); Hollywood Gold Cup Stakes (2020); Whitney Stakes (2020); Awesome Again Stakes (2020)

Awards
- American Champion Older Male Horse (2020)
- Last updated on March 18, 2024

Improbable (February 11, 2016 – March 16, 2024) was a champion American Thoroughbred racehorse who was the 2020 Champion Older Dirt Male after winning three Grade One races; the Hollywood Gold Cup, Whitney Stakes, and Awesome Again Stakes. He also came second in the 2020 Breeders' Cup Classic, won the 2018 Los Alamitos Futurity, and came fourth in the 2019 Kentucky Derby as the favorite.

== Background ==
Improbable was a big powerful chestnut with a large white blaze and stockings. He was bred in Kentucky by G. Watts Humphrey Jr. and St. George Farm, owned by Ian Banwell. Improbable was sired by City Zip, a stakes-winning son of Carson City and a half-brother to champion Ghostzapper. Humphrey and Banwell had purchased Improbable's dam, Rare Event, for $400,000 as a yearling in 2010, a reflection of her excellent pedigree as a daughter of Belmont Stakes and Breeders' Cup Classic winner A.P. Indy. Improbable was her first live foal. He likely suffered oxygen deprivation during the delivery, resulting in a failure to thrive in the days after birth (sometimes called dummy foal syndrome). He required intensive medical care and developed a strong attachment to his handlers.

Improbable was sold as a weanling in 2016 for $110,000 to Taylor Made Agency, which resold him as a yearling in 2017 for $200,000 to WinStar Farm's Maverick Racing and China Horse Club. When he was later put into training with Bob Baffert in 2018, he was placed in the stall of the recently retired Triple Crown winner Justify, who looked very similar to Improbable as they were both big powerful chestnut colts with a white blaze.

== Racing career ==
=== 2018: Two-year-old season ===
Improbable's first race was on September 29, 2018, at Santa Anita Park where he went 3 wide in the final turn. After that it turned into a two horse race where he and Stretford End opened up 4 1/2 lengths on the rest of the field. But with 100 yards to go, Improbable put his head in front under urging, and prevailed to win by a neck. He then picked up his first stakes win in his second race, the Street Sense Stakes on November 2 at Churchill Downs. There he stayed in mid-pack for most of the race, then took over the lead in the stretch and drew off to win by 7 1/4 lengths.

He picked up his first Grade 1 win a month later when he won the Los Alamitos Futurity on December 8. In the race he mimicked his win in the Street Sense by staying off the pace before passing Mucho Gusto and drawing away to win by five lengths.

=== 2019: Three-year-old season ===
Improbable started off the 2019 season with a second-place finish in the Rebel Stakes on March 16, followed by a second-place finish in the Arkansas Derby on April 13. On May 4 he competed in the 2019 Kentucky Derby, where he came in as the 4-1 favorite but finished in fifth. Due to Maximum Security's disqualification, he was moved up to fourth place. On May 18, he was the favorite in the 2019 Preakness Stakes, but finished sixth after being unruly at the start.

After a layoff, Improbable gained his first win of the 2019 season on August 25 by winning the Shared Belief Stakes. Baffert had added blinkers to keep the colt focused and told jockey Drayden Van Dyke to "just let him go." Going off as the 5-2 favorite, Improbable stalked the early pace, then took the lead on the far turn and easily held off a late run from King Jack to win by 2 3/4 lengths. He then competed in the Pennsylvania Derby on September 21, where he came in fourth. To end the 2019 season, he finished fifth in the Breeders' Cup Dirt Mile on November 2.

=== 2020: Four-year-old season ===
Improbable started off the 2020 season on April 11 in the Oaklawn Mile Stakes. The Oaklawn Mile, an ungraded stakes race, attracted a strong field of older horses due to the COVID-19 related closures of many racetracks in the spring. It was the strongest field of older males so far that year. Improbable went off as the second betting choice behind Tom's d'Etat, who was making his first start of the year after finishing his 2019 campaign with wins in the Fayette Stakes and Clark Handicap. Improbable settled just off the early leaders while carried four wide through both turns. He briefly took the lead at the head of the stretch but was no match for Tom's d'Etat, who pulled away late to win by three-quarters of a length.

==== Hollywood Gold Cup ====
On June 6, Improbable went off as the 3-2 favorite in the Hollywood Gold Cup Stakes. He stalked the early pace, then kicked clear on the far turn to win by 3 1/4 lengths over Higher Power. Baffert and Van Dyke had both been confident going into the race. "It was how he has been working in the mornings," said Van Dyke. "I worked him several times going seven furlongs, and these gallop outs that he would give me, it was just unbelievable... He was sitting on a big one, and he ran a big one."

==== Whitney Stakes ====
On August 1, he faced a strong field of five in the Grade I Whitney Stakes at Saratoga Race Course. He went off at odds of 3-1, third choice behind Grade I winners Tom's d'Etat and Code of Honor, with multiple graded stakes winner By My Standards going off at 11–2. Despite acting up again in the starting gate, Improbable broke well and pressed the early pace set by long shot Mr. Buff. He went to the lead on the far turn and held off By My Standards to win by two lengths, with Tom's d'Etat a further half length back in third after stumbling out of the gate and overcoming an extremely slow early pace. Baffert, watching the race from California, noted that he'd recently seen a big change in Improbable. "We called him Little Justify last year," he said. "He was a kid. He's a man now. The distance helps."

==== Awesome Again Stakes ====
On September 26, he raced in the Awesome Again Stakes, which was a highly anticipated match up between Improbable and Maximum Security, who was the champion three-year-old male in 2019 and leading older male for most of 2020. Maximum Security became another member of the Baffert stable after his original trainer was indicted in March 2020 for doping-related charges. This time, Improbable settled at the back of the pack, as much as six lengths behind the early pace set by Take the One O One. Maximum Security was in third, pressed by the other horses in the field through a relatively brisk pace. Around the far turn, Improbable launched from dead last and circled the field to take the lead. Maximum Security tried to match the move but lacked his normal kick. The new running style seemed to work and Improbable opened up a lead and was geared down at the wire to win impressively by 4 1/2 lengths over Maximum Security in a final time of 1:49.01. This was his third straight Grade 1 and it gave him an automatic berth into the Breeders' Cup Classic.

==== Breeders' Cup Classic ====
After his three Grade 1 triumphs, Improbable was made the favorite for the 2020 Breeders' Cup Classic on 7 November. Improbable made a huge rally at the leader, Kentucky Derby and Haskell Invitational winner Authentic, but couldn't catch him, finishing second. But because he ran on the outside and Authentic on the rail, Improbable actually ran a lot of lengths further than Authentic.

== Stud career ==
The day after the Breeders' Cup Classic, Improbable was retired to stand at stud at WinStar Farm in 2021.

Improbable was euthanized on March 16, 2024, after suffering from ataxia. His death was announced by WinStar Farm the following day.

== Racing statistics ==
Date	Race	Racecourse	Grade	Distance	Finish	Margin	Time	Weight	Odds	Jockey	Ref
Sep 29, 2018	Maiden special weight	Santa Anita Park		6 Furlongs	1	Neck	1:10.44	122 lbs	0.40*	Drayden Van Dyke	
Nov 2, 2018	Street Sense Stakes	Churchill Downs		1 mile	1	7 1/4 lengths	1:35.61	122 lbs	0.90*	Drayden Van Dyke	
Dec 8, 2018	Los Alamitos Futurity	Los Alamitos Race Course	I	1 1/16 miles	1	5 lengths	1:41.18	120 lb	0.20*	Drayden Van Dyke	
Mar 16, 2019	Rebel Stakes	Oaklawn Park	II	1 1/16 miles	2	(Neck)	1:42.49	119 lbs	0.40*	Drayden Van Dyke	
Apr 13, 2019	Arkansas Derby	Oaklawn Park	I	1 1/8 miles	2	(1 length)	1:49.91	122 lbs	1.90	José Ortiz	
May 4, 2019	Kentucky Derby	Churchill Downs	1	1 1/4 miles	4 (Note: Improbable crossed the finish line in fifth but was promoted to fourth due to the disqualification of Maximum Security)	(3 1/2 lengths) (Note: The official margins in the chart were measured from Maximum Security, as was the winning time. Improbable was 1 1/2 lengths behind Country House, who became the winner after Maximum Security's disqualification.)	2:03.93	126 lbs	4.00*	Irad Ortiz Jr.	
May 18, 2019	Preakness Stakes	Pimlico Race Course	I	1 3/16 miles	6	(4 lengths)	1:54.34	126 lbs	2.50*	Mike E. Smith	
Aug 25, 2019	Shared Belief Stakes	Del Mar Racetrack	listed	1 mile	1	2 3/4 lengths	1:37.53	124 lbs	0.70*	Drayden Van Dyke	
Sep 21, 2019	Pennsylvania Derby	Parx Casino and Racing	I	1 1/8 miles	4	(1 1/4 lengths)	1:50.94	119 lbs	1.20*	Mike E. Smith	
Nov 2, 2019	Breeders' Cup Dirt Mile	Santa Anita Park	I	1 mile	5	(9 Lengths)	1:36.58	123 lbs	4.70	Rafael Bejarano	
Apr 11, 2020	Oaklawn Mile Stakes	Oaklawn Park		1 mile	2	(3/4 length)	1:35.83	122 lbs	3.40	Drayden Van Dyke	
Jun 6, 2020	Hollywood Gold Cup Stakes	Santa Anita Park	I	1 1/4 miles	1	3 1/4 lengths	2:01.69	122 lbs	1.30*	Drayden Van Dyke	
Aug 1, 2020	Whitney Stakes	Saratoga Race Course	I	1 1/8 miles	1	2 lengths	1:48.65	124 lbs	3.25	Irad Ortiz Jr.	
Sep 26, 2020	Awesome Again Stakes	Santa Anita Park	I	1 1/8 miles	1	4 1/2 lengths	1:49.01	126 lbs	1.80	Drayden Van Dyke	
Nov 7, 2020	Breeders' Cup Classic	Keeneland	I	1 1/4 miles	2	(2 1/4 lengths)	1:59.60	126 lbs	3.70	Irad Ortiz Jr.	

An asterisk after the odds means Improbable was the post-time favorite.

== Pedigree ==
Pedigree of Improbable (USA), 2016
Sire City Zip (USA) b. 1998	Carson City (USA) b. 1987	Mr. Prospector	Raise a Native
Sire City Zip (USA) b. 1998	Carson City (USA) b. 1987	Mr. Prospector	Gold Digger
Sire City Zip (USA) b. 1998	Carson City (USA) b. 1987	Blushing Promise	Blushing Groom
Sire City Zip (USA) b. 1998	Carson City (USA) b. 1987	Blushing Promise	Summertime Promise
Sire City Zip (USA) b. 1998	Baby Zip (USA) b. 1991	Relaunch	In Reality
Sire City Zip (USA) b. 1998	Baby Zip (USA) b. 1991	Relaunch	Foggy Note
Sire City Zip (USA) b. 1998	Baby Zip (USA) b. 1991	Thirty Zip	Tri Jet
Sire City Zip (USA) b. 1998	Baby Zip (USA) b. 1991	Thirty Zip	Sailaway
Dam Rare Event (USA) b. 2009	A.P. Indy (USA) b. 1989	Seattle Slew	Bold Reasoning
Dam Rare Event (USA) b. 2009	A.P. Indy (USA) b. 1989	Seattle Slew	My Charmer
Dam Rare Event (USA) b. 2009	A.P. Indy (USA) b. 1989	Weekend Surprise	Secretariat
Dam Rare Event (USA) b. 2009	A.P. Indy (USA) b. 1989	Weekend Surprise	Lassie Dear
Dam Rare Event (USA) b. 2009	Our Rite of Spring (USA) b. 2001	Stravinsky	Nureyev
Dam Rare Event (USA) b. 2009	Our Rite of Spring (USA) b. 2001	Stravinsky	Fire the Groom
Dam Rare Event (USA) b. 2009	Our Rite of Spring (USA) b. 2001	Turkish Tryst	Turkoman
Dam Rare Event (USA) b. 2009	Our Rite of Spring (USA) b. 2001	Turkish Tryst	Darbyvail, out of Luiana (family 16-h)
