= 2026 Breeders' Cup Classic =

43rd Breeders' Cup Classic
- Breeders' Cup Classic
- Location: Keeneland
- Date: October 31, 2026
- Winning horse: Sovereignty
- Winning time: 2:00.36
- Final odds: 1.97
- Jockey: Junior Alvarado
- Trainer: William I. Mott
- Owner: Godolphin
- Conditions: Fast
- Surface: Dirt
- Attendance: 45,775

The 2026 Breeder's Cup Classic was the 43rd running of the Breeder's Cup Classic, part of the 2026 Breeder's Cup World Championship program, and the fourth race in the so-called Grand Slam of Thoroughbred racing in North America.

The race was won by Sovereignty, the winner of the 2025 Kentucky Derby. The winner of the previous year's Breeders' Cup Classic, Forever Young, was also entered to defend the title, but ultimately lost and finished fifth.

== Results ==
Finish	Program Number	Horse	Jockey	Trainer	Morning Line Odds	Final Odds	Winnings	Margin
1	2	Sovereignty	Junior Alvarado	William I. Mott	5/2	1.97	$3,640,000	–
2	4	The Puma	Javier Castellano	Gustavo Delgado	10/1	17.13	$1,190,000	1 3/4 lengths
3	7	Knightsbridge	Luis Saez	William I. Mott	9/2	3.90	$630,000	2 1/4 lengths
4	1	T O Password	Kazushi Kimura	Daisuke Takayanagi	30/1	40.37	$350,000	3 lengths
5	5	Forever Young	Ryusei Sakai	Yoshito Yahagi	2/1	1.73	$210,000	3 lengths
6	3	Golden Tempo	José Ortiz	Cherie DeVaux	5/1	5.70	$70,000	9 lengths
7	8	Napoleon Solo	John Velazquez	Chad Summers	15/1	16.52	$70,000	21 lengths
SCR	6	Magnitude	José Ortiz	Steve Asmussen	6/1	-	-	-

Times: 1/4 - 23.54; 1/2 - 47.64; 3/4 - 1:11.43; mile - 1:36.26; final - 2:00.36
Splits for each quarter-mile: (23.54)(24.10)(23.79)(24.83)(24.10)
