= 2025 Belmont Stakes =

American horse race

157th Belmont Stakes
- Belmont Stakes
- Grade I stakes race
- Location: Saratoga Race Course; Saratoga Springs, New York, US
- Date: June 7, 2025
- Distance: 1 1/4 mi (10 furlongs; 2,012 m)
- Winning horse: Sovereignty
- Winning time: 2:00.69
- Final odds: 2.50
- Jockey: Junior Alvarado
- Trainer: William I. Mott
- Owner: Godolphin
- Conditions: Good
- Surface: Dirt
- Attendance: 46,243

The 2025 Belmont Stakes was the 157th running of the Belmont Stakes. It took place on Saturday, June 7, for the second year in a row at Saratoga Race Course. The race was won by 2025 Kentucky Derby winner Sovereignty, making him the first colt since Triple Crown winner Justify in 2018 to win at least two legs of the Triple Crown. The stakes race had a $2 million purse. The race was run without the Triple Crown at stake as Kentucky Derby winner Sovereignty did not run in the Preakness, thus forsaking the chance at the title.

== Background ==
The 157th running of the Belmont Stakes was held on Saturday June 7, 2025 at 6:50 p.m. EDT and was shorter than the usual 1 1/2 miles (12 furlongs; 2,414 meters) due to Saratoga's smaller main dirt track.

Television coverage was broadcast by Fox Sports.

On December 8, 2023, New York Governor Kathy Hochul announced a US$455 million renovation plan for Belmont Park in Elmont, New York which would move the Belmont Stakes to Saratoga Race Course in Saratoga Springs, New York for the interim, with construction expected to last into 2025. The prize purse had been increased from $1.5 million to $2 million.

This was the second time the Belmont was at Saratoga Race Course. The most recent time a Belmont Stakes was held elsewhere was from 1963 to 1967 at Aqueduct Race Track in Ozone Park, Queens, the last time Belmont Park was under construction.

== Post positions & results ==
On May 8, 2025 Kentucky Derby champion Sovereignty arrived at Saratoga Race Course. Preakness Stakes champion Journalism was also in the field. The post position draw took place on June 2. A total of eight horses made up the field for the Belmont Stakes. Journalism was installed as the 8-5 morning line favorite, drawing post no. 7. Sovereignty was the second choice pick, drawing post 2 at 2-1.

Sovereignty won the race by three lengths, with Journalism finishing second and Baeza finishing third, a repeat of the top three finishers from the Kentucky Derby, in the same order.

| Finish | Program Number | Horse | Jockey | Trainer | Morning Line Odds | Final Odds |
|---|---|---|---|---|---|---|
| 1 | 2 | Sovereignty | Junior Alvarado | William I. Mott | 2-1 | 2.50 |
| 2 | 7 | Journalism | Umberto Rispoli | Michael W. McCarthy | 8-5 | 2.05 |
| 3 | 6 | Baeza | Flavien Prat | John Shirreffs | 4-1 | 3.50 |
| 4 | 3 | Rodriguez | Mike Smith | Bob Baffert | 6-1 | 7.10 |
| 5 | 1 | Hill Road | Irad Ortiz Jr. | Chad C. Brown | 10-1 | 14.20 |
| 6 | 8 | Heart of Honor (GB) | Saffie Osborne | Jamie Osborne | 30-1 | 20.50 |
| 7 | 4 | Uncaged | Luis Saez | Todd A. Pletcher | 30-1 | 19.00 |
| 8 | 5 | Crudo | John R. Velazquez | Todd A. Pletcher | 15-1 | 11.80 |

== Payout ==
| Pgm | Horse | Win | Place | Show |
|---|---|---|---|---|
| 2 | Sovereignty | 7.00 | 3.20 | 2.30 |
| 7 | Journalism | | 3.20 | 2.30 |
| 6 | Baeza | | | 2.60 |

- $1.00 Exacta (2-7) $6.60
- $0.50 Trifecta (2-7-6) $6.90
- $0.10 Superfecta (2-7-6-3) $4.05

Times: 1/4 mile – 0:23.42; 1/2 mile – 0:47.60; 3/4 mile – 1:12.20; mile – 1:36.70; final – 2:00.69.

Splits for each quarter-mile: (:23.42) (:24.18) (:24.60) (:24.50) (:23.99)

| Preceded by 2025 Preakness Stakes | Triple Crown | Succeeded by 2026 Kentucky Derby |
