= Tom's d'Etat =

American thoroughbred racehorse (2013–2026)

- Sire: Smart Strike
- Grandsire: Mr. Prospector
- Dam: Julia Tuttle
- Damsire: Giants Causeway
- Sex: Stallion
- Foaled: March 7, 2013; Kentucky, U.S.
- Died: October 2026 (aged 13)
- Country: United States
- Color: Bay
- Breeder: SF Bloodstock LLC
- Owner: G M B Racing (Gayle Benson)
- Trainer: Albert Stall Jr.
- Record: 19:11-2-2
- Earnings: $1,627,272

Major wins
- Tenacious Stakes (2018); Alydar Stakes (2019); Clark Handicap (2019); Fayette Stakes (2019); Oaklawn Mile Stakes (2020); Stephen Foster Stakes (2020)

Tom's d'Etat (March 7, 2013 – October 2026) was an American Thoroughbred racehorse and the winner of the 2019 Clark Handicap and 2020 Stephen Foster Stakes.

== Career ==
Tom's d'Etat's first race was on May 6, 2016, at Churchill Downs, where he came in 11th. He picked up his first win on August 5, 2016, at Saratoga.

He spent 2017 and 2018 mostly competing in Allowance Optional Claiming races, picking up 4 wins in 5 races. He fractured his leg during the 2017 season, missing over a year.

On December 22, 2018, he competed in and won his first stakes race at the age of 6, the Tenacious Stakes at Fair Grounds Race Course. He was the favorite in the race at 7:10 odds.

=== 6-year-old season ===
Tom's d'Etat started off the 2019 season by competing in the Grade 1 Pegasus World Cup Invitational Stakes, but placed 9th. He did not pick up his first win for the 2019 season until he captured the 2019 Alydar Stakes. He beat Wooderson by a length.

He finished the 2019 season with two wins. He captured the Fayette Stakes on October 26, beating Mr Freeze by over four lengths in a sloppy race. Tom's d'Etat then captured the biggest win of his career on November 29, 2019, by winning the Grade 1 Clark Handicap. He entered the race as a 9:10 favorite and defeated Owendale and Mr Freeze.

=== 7-year-old season ===
Tom's d'Etat started off the 2020 season on April 11, when he captured the Oaklawn Mile Stakes, beating multiple Grade 1 winner Improbable by three-quarters of a length on a sloppy track.

He then followed this victory up with a Grade 2 victory in the Stephen Foster Stakes on June 27, defeating another multiple graded stakes winner By My Standards.

Statistics
Date	Race	Racecourse	Grade	Distance	Finish	Margin	Time	Weight	Odds	Jockey	Ref
May 6, 2016	Maiden	Churchill Downs		1 mile	11	(13 1/4 Lengths)	1:37.70	116 lbs	16.40	Luis Saez	
May 30, 2016	Maiden	Churchill Downs		1 1/4 miles	2	(2 3/4 Lengths)	2:02.84	116 lbs	9.30	Ricardo Santana Jr.	
Aug 5, 2016	Maiden	Saratoga Race Course		1 1/8 miles	1	4 Lengths	1:49.66	118 lbs	4.80	Ricardo Santana Jr.	
Mar 20, 2017	Allowance	Fair Grounds Race Course		1 mile 70 yards	1	3 3/4 Lengths	1:41.51	119 lbs	1.50	David R. Flores	
May 5, 2017	Allowance	Churchill Downs		1 1/16 miles	4	(2 1/4 Lengths)	1:46.19	123 lbs	2.30*	David R. Flores	
Jun 10, 2017	Allowance	Churchill Downs		1 1/16 miles	1	2 1/4 Lengths	1:42.46	122 lbs	1.00*	Shaun Bridgmohan	
Jul 27, 2017	Allowance	Saratoga Race Course		1 1/8 miles	1	9 Lengths	1:51.33	124 lbs	0.85*	Joel Rosario	
Nov 4, 2018	Allowance	Churchill Downs		1 mile	1	7 1/4 Lengths	1:34.85	121 lbs	1.00	Shaun Bridgmohan	
Dec 22, 2018	Tenacious Stakes	Fair Grounds Race Course		1 mile 70 yards	1	3 1/2 Lengths	1:42.49	124 lbs	0.70*	Shaun Bridgmohan	
Jan 26, 2019	Pegasus World Cup Invitational Stakes	Gulfstream Park	|	1 1/8 miles	9	(26 1/4 Lengths)	1:47.71	124 lbs	19.50	Shaun Bridgmohan	
May 3, 2019	Alysheba Stakes	Churchill Downs	||	1 1/16 miles	2	(4 3/4 Lengths)	1:41.10	118 lbs	6.00	Shaun Bridgmohan	
Jun 15, 2019	Stephen Foster Stakes	Churchill Downs	||	1 1/8 miles	3	(2 1/4 Lengths)	1:49.27	121 lbs	4.50	Shaun Bridgmohan	
Aug 2, 2019	Alydar Stakes	Saratoga Race Course		1 1/8 miles	1	1 Length	1:47.25	122 lbs	1.00*	Joel Rosario	
Aug 31, 2019	Woodward Stakes	Saratoga Race Course	|	1 1/8 miles	4	1 3/4 Lengths	1:48.11	118 lbs	2.25	Irad Ortiz Jr.	
Oct 26, 2019	Fayette Stakes	Keeneland	||	1 1/8 miles	1	4 1/4 Lengths	1:49.17	121 lbs	1.50*	Joel Rosario	
Nov 29, 2019	Clark Handicap	Churchill Downs	|	1 1/8 miles	1	3 1/4 Lengths	1:48.84	123 lbs	0.90*	Joel Rosario	
Apr 11, 2020	Oaklawn Mile Stakes	Oaklawn Park		1 mile	1	3/4 Length	1:35.83	122 lbs	0.80*	Joel Rosario	
Jun 27, 2020	Stephen Foster Stakes	Churchill Downs	||	1 1/8 miles	1	4 1/4 Lengths	1:47.30	124 lbs	1.30*	Miguel Mena	
Aug 1, 2020	Whitney Stakes	Saratoga Race Course	|	1 1/8 miles	3	(2 1/2 Lengths)	1:48.65	124 lbs	1.00*	Joel Rosario	
Nov 7, 2020	Breeders' Cup Classic	Keeneland	I	1 1/4 miles	9	(14 1/4 Lengths)	1:59.60	126 lbs	4.20	Joel Rosario	

== Pedigree ==
Pedigree of Tom's d'Etat (USA), 2013
Sire Smart Strike (CAN) b. 1992	Mr. Prospector (USA) b. 1970	Raise a Native	Native Dancer
Sire Smart Strike (CAN) b. 1992	Mr. Prospector (USA) b. 1970	Raise a Native	Raise You
Sire Smart Strike (CAN) b. 1992	Mr. Prospector (USA) b. 1970	Gold Digger	Nashua
Sire Smart Strike (CAN) b. 1992	Mr. Prospector (USA) b. 1970	Gold Digger	Sequence
Sire Smart Strike (CAN) b. 1992	Classy 'n Smart (CAN) b. 1981	Smarten	Cyane
Sire Smart Strike (CAN) b. 1992	Classy 'n Smart (CAN) b. 1981	Smarten	Smataire
Sire Smart Strike (CAN) b. 1992	Classy 'n Smart (CAN) b. 1981	No Class	Nodouble
Sire Smart Strike (CAN) b. 1992	Classy 'n Smart (CAN) b. 1981	No Class	Classy Quillo
Dam Julia Tuttle (USA) b. 2005	Giant's Causeway (USA) b. 1997	Storm Cat	Storm Bird
Dam Julia Tuttle (USA) b. 2005	Giant's Causeway (USA) b. 1997	Storm Cat	Terlingua
Dam Julia Tuttle (USA) b. 2005	Giant's Causeway (USA) b. 1997	Mariah's Storm	Rahy
Dam Julia Tuttle (USA) b. 2005	Giant's Causeway (USA) b. 1997	Mariah's Storm	Immense
Dam Julia Tuttle (USA) b. 2005	Candy Cane (ARG) b. 1997	Ride the Rails	Cryptoclearance
Dam Julia Tuttle (USA) b. 2005	Candy Cane (ARG) b. 1997	Ride the Rails	Herbalesian
Dam Julia Tuttle (USA) b. 2005	Candy Cane (ARG) b. 1997	Candy Girl	Candy Stripes
Dam Julia Tuttle (USA) b. 2005	Candy Cane (ARG) b. 1997	Candy Girl	City Girl

== Death ==
Tom's d'Etat died in October 2026, at the age of 13.
