= Journalism (horse) =

American racehorse, winner of the 2025 Preakness Stakes

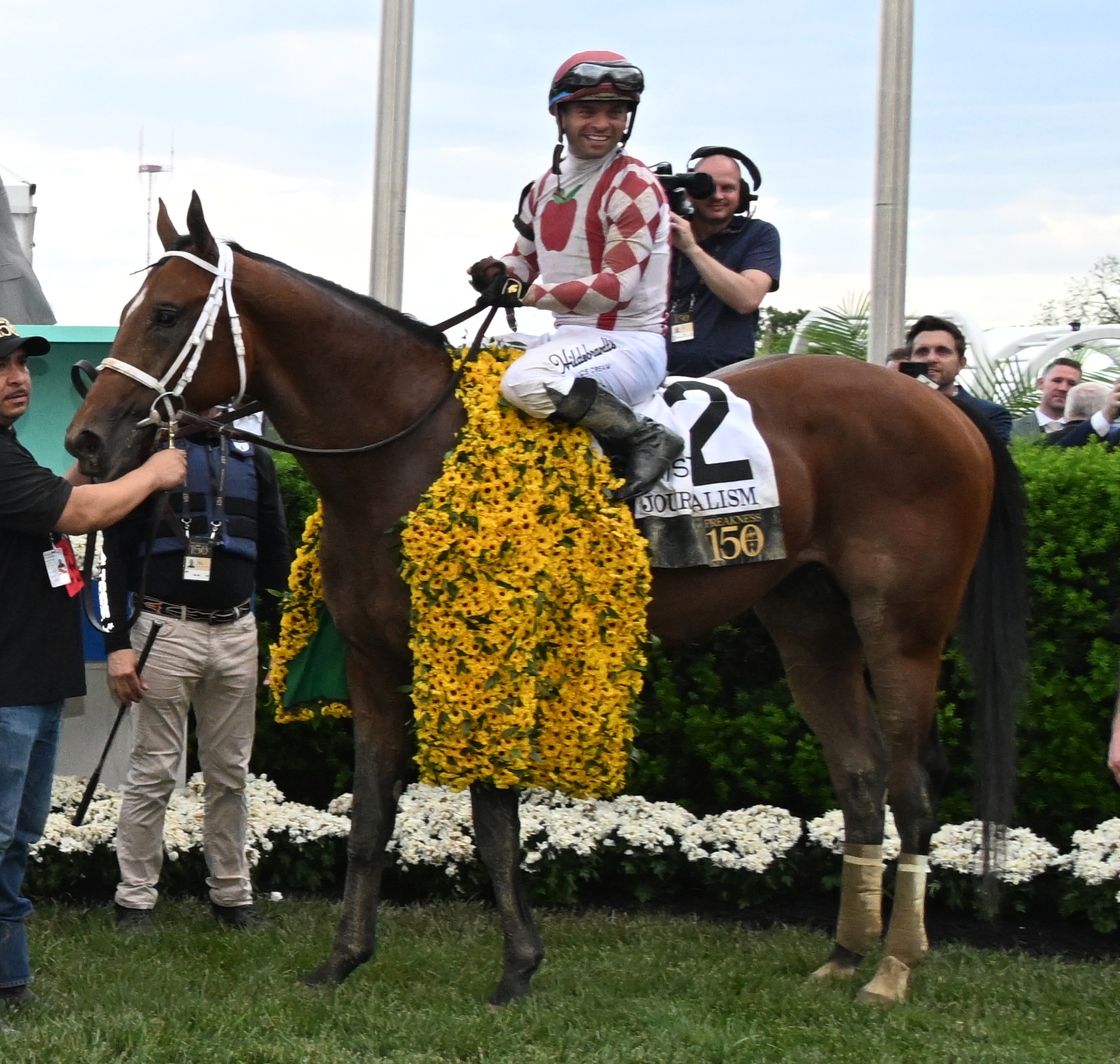
- Journalism at Preakness Stakes
- Sire: Curlin
- Grandsire: Smart Strike
- Dam: Mopotism
- Damsire: Uncle Mo
- Sex: Colt
- Foaled: February 6, 2022
- Country: United States
- Color: Bay
- Breeder: Don Alberto Corporation
- Owner: Bridlewood Farm, Don Alberto Stable, Eclipse Thoroughbred Partners, Elayne Stables 5 & Robert V. LaPenta - added as lessees on March 31, 2025: Derrick Smith, Mrs. John Magnier and Michael Tabor
- Trainer: Michael W. McCarthy
- Record: 14: 7 - 3 - 3
- Earnings: $4,770,755

Major wins
- Los Alamitos Futurity (2024); San Felipe Stakes (2025); Santa Anita Derby (2025); Haskell Stakes (2025); San Diego Handicap (2026); American Classics win: Preakness Stakes (2025)

Journalism (foaled February 6, 2022) is a retired multiple-Grade winning American Thoroughbred racehorse. As a three-year-old, he won the 2025 Grade I Santa Anita Derby, Preakness Stakes, and Haskell Stakes, and finished second in the 2025 Kentucky Derby, Belmont Stakes, and the Pacific Classic.

In his four-year-old season, he won the 2026 San Diego Handicap, and finished third in both the Oaklawn Handicap and the Metropolitan Mile. After winning the San Diego Handicap, he retired due to an injury. He finished unplaced only once in his career, finishing fourth in the 2025 Breeders' Cup Classic.

== Background ==
Journalism is a bay stallion who was bred in Kentucky by Don Alberto Corporation out of the multiple Grade I-placed, graded stakes winner Mopotism. The daughter of Uncle Mo won the 2018 Grade II La Canada Stakes and placed in four Grade I stakes—the 2016 Starlet Stakes, 2017 La Brea Stakes, 2018 Santa Margarita Stakes, and 2019 Ogden Phipps Stakes. She was retired with a 3–5–6 record from 26 starts that included six other graded stakes performances with Earning of $876,090. Don Alberto bought Mopotism for $1.05 million during Fasig-Tipton's 2019 The November Sale out of Kingwood Farm's consignment. Journalism is the mare's first foal. Mopotism is out of the Bernardini daughter Peppy Rafaela, who is a half sister to multiple graded stakes winner Songster (Songandaprayer).

Journalism's sire is Curlin, the 2007 and 2008 American Horse of the Year who stands in 2025 at Hill 'n' Dale Farms for $225,000.

Eclipse purchased Journalism for $825,000 at Fasig-Tipton's The Saratoga Sale in 2023 out of the Denali Stud consignment. The Eclipse portion of the ownership group includes breeder Don Alberto, Bridlewood Farm, Elayne Stables 5, and Robert LaPenta. On March 31, 2025, prior to the running of the Santa Anita Derby the Coolmore group after an agreement to stand Journalism at Ashford Stud upon his retirement, that the ownership also includes Derrick Smith, Mrs. John Magnier and Michael Tabor, and that they are listed as lessees.

Journalism's name came from co-owner Aron Wellman, who was a sports editor for the Beverly Hills High School student newspaper.

== Statistics ==
Date	Distance	Race	Grade	Track	Odds	Field	Finish	Winning Time	Winning (Losing) Margin	Jockey	Ref
2024 – Two-year-old season
Oct 27, 2024	6 furlongs	Maiden Special Weight		Santa Anita	4.60	5	3	1:10.71	(2 3/4 lengths)	Umberto Rispoli	
Nov 17, 2024	6 furlongs	Maiden Special Weight		Del Mar	4.90	10	1	1:10.71	2 1/2 lengths	Ricardo Gonzalez	
Dec 14, 2024	1 1/16 miles	Los Alamitos Futurity	II	Los Alamitos	2.80	5	1	1:43.04	3 1/2 lengths	Umberto Rispoli	
2025 – Three-year-old season
Mar 1, 2025	1 1/16 miles	San Felipe Stakes	II	Santa Anita	3.10*	5	1	1:42.24	1 3/4 lengths	Umberto Rispoli	
Apr 5, 2025	1 1/8 miles	Santa Anita Derby	I	Santa Anita	1.00*	5	1	1:49.56	3/4 length	Umberto Rispoli	
May 3, 2025	1 1/4 miles	Kentucky Derby	I	Churchill Downs	3.42*	19	2	2:02.31	(1 1/2 lengths)	Umberto Rispoli	
May 17, 2025	1 3/16 miles	Preakness Stakes	I	Pimlico	1.00*	9	1	1:55.47	1/2 length	Umberto Rispoli	
June 7, 2025	1 1/4 miles	Belmont Stakes	I	Saratoga	2.05*	8	2	2:00.69	(3 lengths)	Umberto Rispoli	
Jul 19, 2025	1 1/8 miles	Haskell Stakes	I	Monmouth Park	0.40*	8	1	1:48.15	1/2 length	Umberto Rispoli	
Aug 30, 2025	1 1/4 miles	Pacific Classic Stakes	I	Del Mar	0.40*	7	2	2:01.00	(3 1/2 lengths)	Umberto Rispoli	
Nov 1, 2025	1 1/4 miles	Breeders' Cup Classic	I	Del Mar	4.80	9	4	2:00.19	(3 3/4 lengths)	José Ortiz	
2026 – Four-year-old season
Apr 18, 2026	1 1/8 miles	Oaklawn Handicap	II	Oaklawn Park	1.70	6	3	1:47.49	(3 3/4 lengths)	José Ortiz	
Jun 6, 2026	1 mile	Metropolitan Handicap	I	Saratoga	2.03	7	3	1:34.85	(4 3/4 lengths)	José Ortiz	
Jul 18, 2026	1 1/16 miles	San Diego Handicap	II	Del Mar	0.20*	5	1	1:42.65	3/4 length	Umberto Rispoli	

Notes:
An (*) asterisk after the odds means Journalism was the post-time favorite.

== Pedigree ==
Pedigree of Journalism, bay colt, February 6, 2022
Sire Curlin (2004)	Smart Strike (1992)	Mr. Prospector (1970)	Raise A Native (1961)
Sire Curlin (2004)	Smart Strike (1992)	Mr. Prospector (1970)	Gold Digger (1962)
Sire Curlin (2004)	Smart Strike (1992)	Classy 'n Smart (1981)	Smarten (1976)
Sire Curlin (2004)	Smart Strike (1992)	Classy 'n Smart (1981)	No Class (CAN) (1974)
Sire Curlin (2004)	Sherriff's Deputy (1994)	Deputy Minister* (CAN) (1979)	Vice Regent (CAN) (1967)
Sire Curlin (2004)	Sherriff's Deputy (1994)	Deputy Minister* (CAN) (1979)	Mint Copy (CAN) (1970)
Sire Curlin (2004)	Sherriff's Deputy (1994)	Barbarika (1985)	Bates Motel (1979)
Sire Curlin (2004)	Sherriff's Deputy (1994)	Barbarika (1985)	War Exchange (1972)
Dam Mopotism (2014)	Uncle Mo (2008)	Indian Charlie (1995)	In Excess (1987)
Dam Mopotism (2014)	Uncle Mo (2008)	Indian Charlie (1995)	Soviet Sojourn (1989)
Dam Mopotism (2014)	Uncle Mo (2008)	Playa Maya (2000)	Arch (1995)
Dam Mopotism (2014)	Uncle Mo (2008)	Playa Maya (2000)	Dixie Slippers (1995)
Dam Mopotism (2014)	Peppy Rafaela (2009)	Bernardini (2003)	A.P. Indy (1989)
Dam Mopotism (2014)	Peppy Rafaela (2009)	Bernardini (2003)	Cara Rafaela (1993)
Dam Mopotism (2014)	Peppy Rafaela (2009)	Peppy Lapeau (1998)	French Deputy* (1977)
Dam Mopotism (2014)	Peppy Rafaela (2009)	Peppy Lapeau (1998)	Peppy Raja (1985) (family 19)

- Journalism is inbred 3S x 5D to the stallion Deputy Minister, meaning that he appears in the third generation on the sire side and in the fifth generation (via French Deputy) on the dam side of his pedigree.
