= Mushka (horse) =

American-bred Thoroughbred racehorse

- Sire: Empire Maker
- Grandsire: Unbridled
- Dam: Sluice
- Damsire: Seeking the Gold
- Sex: Filly
- Foaled: 2005
- Country: United States
- Colour: Dark bay
- Breeder: Diane Snowden
- Owner: Brushwood Stables
- Trainer: William I. Mott
- Record: 15:5-2-3
- Earnings: $$723,625

Major wins
- Demoiselle Stakes (2007); Glens Falls Handicap (2009); Spinster Stakes (2009)
- Last updated on October 17, 2009

Mushka was born in 2005 and was owned by Brushwood Stable, and was bred by Diane Snowden. She was trained by William I. Mott and is most recognized for winning the Grade one Juddmonte Spinster Stakes in 2009. Following this win, Mushka traveled to Santa Anita Park, California for the 26th running of the Breeders' Cup Ladies' Classic, in which she placed second. She was ridden by jockey Kent J. Desormeaux.

== Auction history ==
She was originally owned and campaign by Zayat Stables, which purchased her at auction as a yearling for $1.6 million. She was later purchased by Abbott Bloodstock, on behalf of Brushwood Stable, for $2.4 million at the 2008 Keeneland November Sales. Brushwood owned Mushka from 10 January 2009 until 26 March 2010 when SF Bloodstock & Newgate Farm then bought her for $650,000.
