= Umberto Rispoli =

Italian jockey

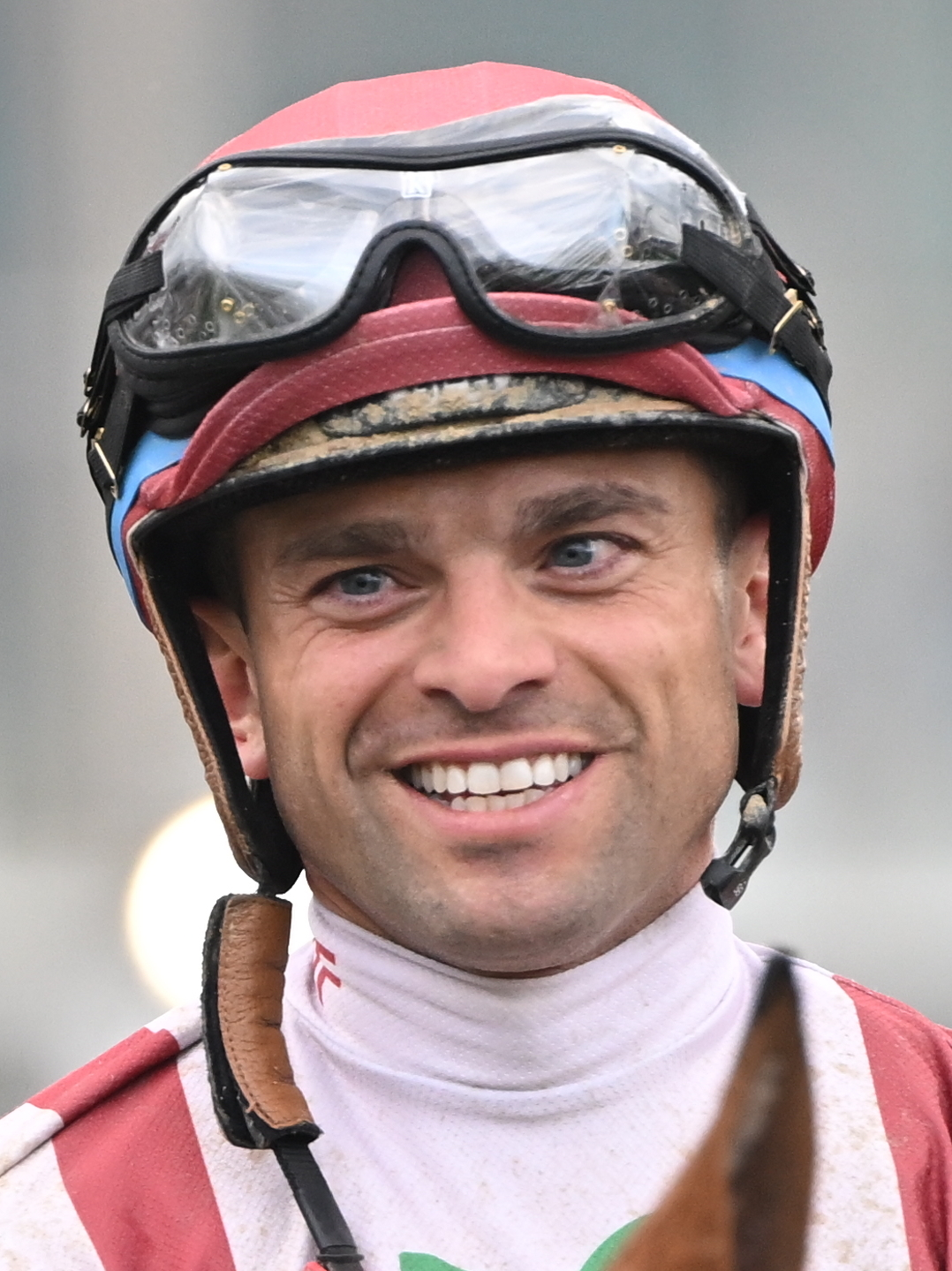
- Rispoli following his victory at the 2025 Preakness Stakes

Personal information
- Nationality: Italian
- Born: 31 August 1988 (age 37) San Severino Marche, Macerata, Italy
- Occupation: Jockey
- Height: 152 cm (60 in)
- Weight: 52 kg (115 lb)
- Spouse: Kimberley Mosse
- Children: 2

Horse racing career
- Sport: Horse racing

Significant horses
- Aoife Alainn, Kinshasa no Kiseki, Rulership, Molly Malone, Rock Your World, Formidable Man, Journalism

Umberto Rispoli (born 31 August 1988) is an Italian horse racing jockey. In 2025, he became the first jockey from Italy to win an American Triple Crown race when he rode the winning horse in the Preakness Stakes. As of May 2025, Rispoli has accrued over $48 million in purses and won 615 races.

Rispoli commenced his apprenticeship in 2005 and graduated to the senior ranks in 2010. He was a member of the Hong Kong Jockey Club until December 2019 when he moved his tack to Southern California.

== Background ==
Rispoli was born 31 August 1988 in San Severino Marche, Italy, but his family is originally from Naples. He grew up in Scampia, the infamous neighborhood later to be used as the set for the Gomorrah (TV series). In the summer of 2002, Rispoli left Naples to reach Luigi Camici's stable, in Cisterna di Latina. Camici saddled the Arc de Triomphe winner Tony Bin in 1988, the same year Rispoli was born. In Autumn 2004, Rispoli got his Jockey Licence in the Italian Racing School in Pisa. On 5 February 2005, he made his debut in Varese for Alduino Botti, who later became his trainer for five years. He rode 82 winners on his first year as apprentice. In 2009, Rispoli was crowned Champion Jockey for the first time, a feat he repeated in 2010. He spent five seasons in France between 2012 and 2016, before moving to Hong Kong, and then in 2019 to Los Angeles, California, where he lives with his wife Kimberley Mosse and their son Hayden.

== Career as a jockey ==
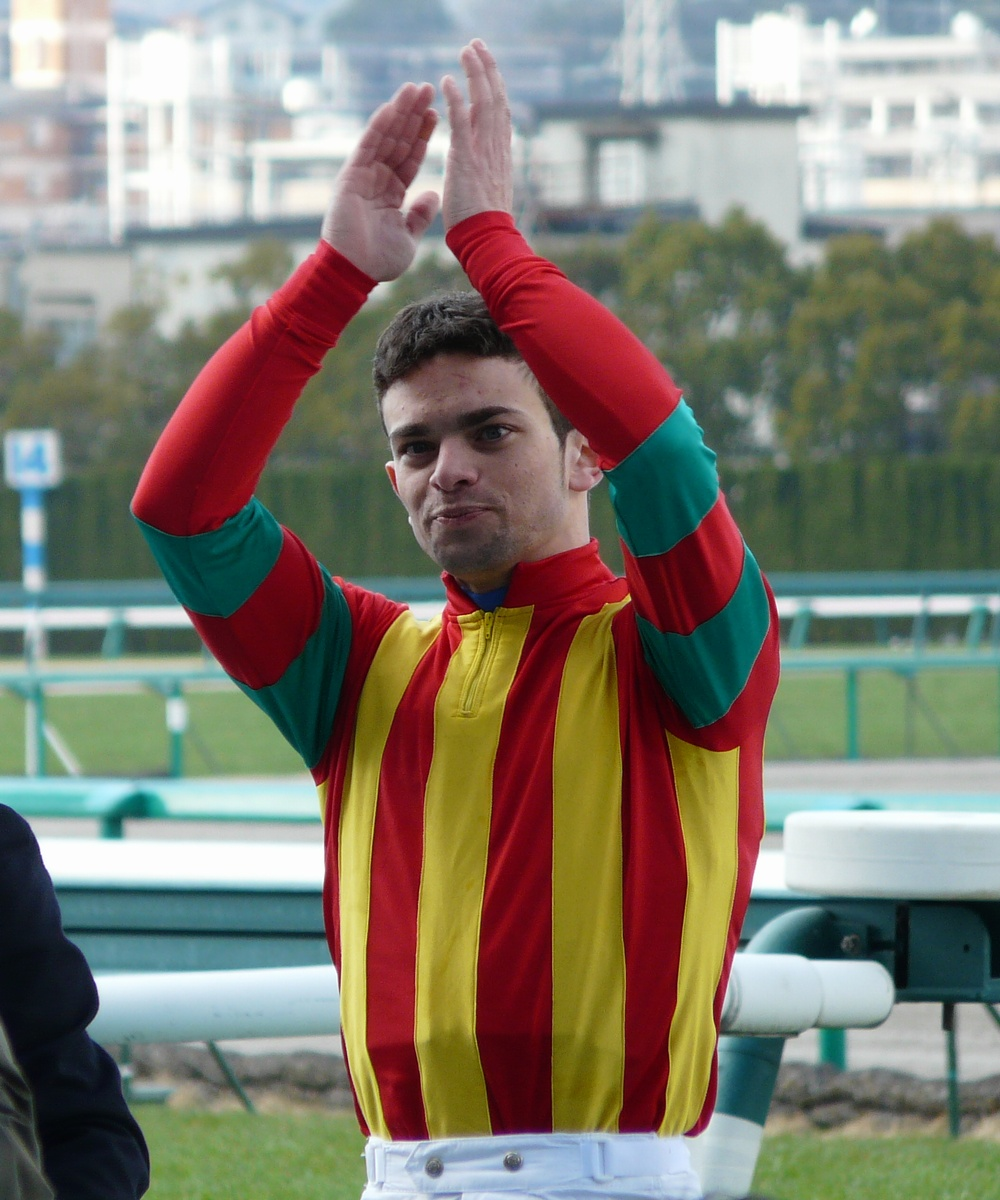
Rispoli following his victory at the 2011 Takamatsunomiya Kinen

In February 2005, Rispoli rode his first race in Varese on Polar Eagle. He finished second. On February 2, 2005 he rode his first winner, Pace Maker. He was crowned Champion Italian Jockey during the 2009 and 2010 racing seasons. In 2009, exactly 20 years later to the day, he broke the Italian record of Gianfranco Dettori's 229 wins. Rispoli did 230 on Sugarland in Pisa, eventually setting the new record at 245. After spending five seasons (2012–2016) in France with few Gr1 success in the bag, he moved to Hong Kong and rode under HKJC. In December 2019, he moved to Southern California where he made quite an impact in the local jockey colony. He has ridden 1492 winners around the world, including Italy, France, England, Germany, Czech Republic, Japan, Hong Kong, South Africa and Mauritius.

== Major wins ==
Twice Italian Champion Jockey: 2009 and 2010

Italy

- Premio Lydia Tesio (Group 1) – Aoife Alainn (2010)
- Premio Presidente della Repubblica (Group 1) – Estejo (2011)
- Premio Gran Criterium (Group 1) – Priore Philip (2013)
- Premio Presidente della Repubblica (Group 1) – Cleo Fan (2015)

Japan

- Takamatsunomiya Kinen (Group 1) – Kinshasa no Kiseki (2011)

Hong Kong

- Queen Elizabeth II Cup (Group 1) – Rulership (2012)

France

- Prix du Cadran (Group 1) – Molly Malone (2012)
- Critérium International (Group 1) – Vert de Grece (2014)

United States

- Santa Anita Derby (Group 1) - Rock Your World (2021)
- Shoemaker Mile Stakes (Group 1) - Smooth Like Strait (2021)
- Rodeo Drive Stakes (Group 1) - Going to Vegas (2021, 2022)
- Gamely Stakes (Group 1) - Ocean Road (2022)
- Frank E. Kilroe Mile Stakes (Group 1) - Formidable Man (2025)
- Preakness Stakes (Group 1) - Journalism (2025)

== Year-end charts ==
| Chart (2019–present) | Year-End Rank by earnings |
|---|---|
| National Earnings List for Jockeys 2019 | 819 |
| National Earnings List for Jockeys 2020 | 19 |
| National Earnings List for Jockeys 2021 | 14 |
