= 2025 Preakness Stakes =

150th Preakness Stakes
- Preakness Stakes
- Grade I stakes race
- Location: Pimlico Race Course; Baltimore, Maryland, U.S.
- Date: May 17, 2025
- Distance: 1 3/16 mi (9.5 furlongs; 1.9 km)
- Winning horse: Journalism
- Winning time: 1:55.37
- Jockey: Umberto Rispoli
- Trainer: Michael W. McCarthy
- Owner: Bridlewood Farm, Don Alberto Stable, Eclipse Thoroughbred Partners, Elayne Stables 5, Robert V. LaPenta, Derrick Smith, Mrs. John Magnier and Michael Tabor
- Conditions: Fast
- Surface: Dirt

The 2025 Preakness Stakes was the 150th Preakness Stakes, a Grade I stakes race for three-year-old Thoroughbreds at a distance of 1 3/16 miles (9 1/2 furlongs; 1,911 meters). The race is the second of the three legs of the American Triple Crown and is held annually at Pimlico Race Course in Baltimore, Maryland. The Preakness Stakes is traditionally held on the third Saturday in May, two weeks after the Kentucky Derby. The 2025 edition occurred on May 17, with a scheduled post time of 7:01 p.m. EDT and television coverage by NBC. The 2025 purse was valued at $2 million. The race was won by Journalism.

== Entries ==
On May 12, a field of nine horses was drawn. Journalism, the 8-5 morning line favorite who finished second in the 2025 Kentucky Derby, drew post 2. Trainer D. Wayne Lukas, who won the 2024 Preakness Stakes, was back with American Promise, who drew post 3. Sandman drew post 7 after finishing seventh in the Derby.

== Results ==
Finish	Program Number	Horse	Jockey	Trainer	Morning Line Odds	Final Odds	Margin (Lengths)	Winnings
1	2	Journalism	Umberto Rispoli	Michael W. McCarthy	8-5	1.00		$1,200,000
2	9	Gosger	Luis Saez	Brendan P. Walsh	20-1	15.50	1/2	$400,000
3	7	Sandman	John R. Velazquez	Mark E. Casse	4-1	6.40	2 3/4	$220,000
4	1	Goal Oriented	Flavien Prat	Bob Baffert	6-1	8.00	6 3/4	$120,000
5	4	Heart of Honor (GB)	Saffie Osborne	Jamie Osborne	12-1	19.70	8 3/4	$60,000
6	6	River Thames	Irad Ortiz Jr.	Todd A. Pletcher	9-2	9.70	10 1/2	
7	5	Pay Billy	Raul E. Mena	Michael E. Gorham	20-1	17.30	15 1/2	
8	3	American Promise	Nik Juarez	D. Wayne Lukas	15-1	12.70	17 1/4	
9	8	Clever Again	José Ortiz	Steven M. Asmussen	5-1	5.50	30 1/2	

Track condition: Fast

Times: 1/4 mile – 23.19; 1/2 mile – 46.66; 3/4 mile – 1:10.23; mile – 1:35.89; final – 1:55.47.
Splits for each quarter-mile: (23.47) (23.57) (25:66) (25.58) (19.58 for final 3/16)

== Payout ==
Pgm	Horse	Win	Place	Show
2	Journalism	$4.00	$2.80	$2.40
9	Gosger	–	$9.00	$5.40
7	Sandman	–	–	$3.60

- $1 Exacta (2–9) $16.90
- $1 Trifecta: (2–9–7) $73.50
- $1 Superfecta: (2-9-7-1) $303.40
- $1 Super High Five (2-9-7-1-4) $1,767.30

Preceded by 2025 Kentucky Derby	Triple Crown	Succeeded by 2025 Belmont Stakes
