= Goldencents =

American-bred Thoroughbred racehorse

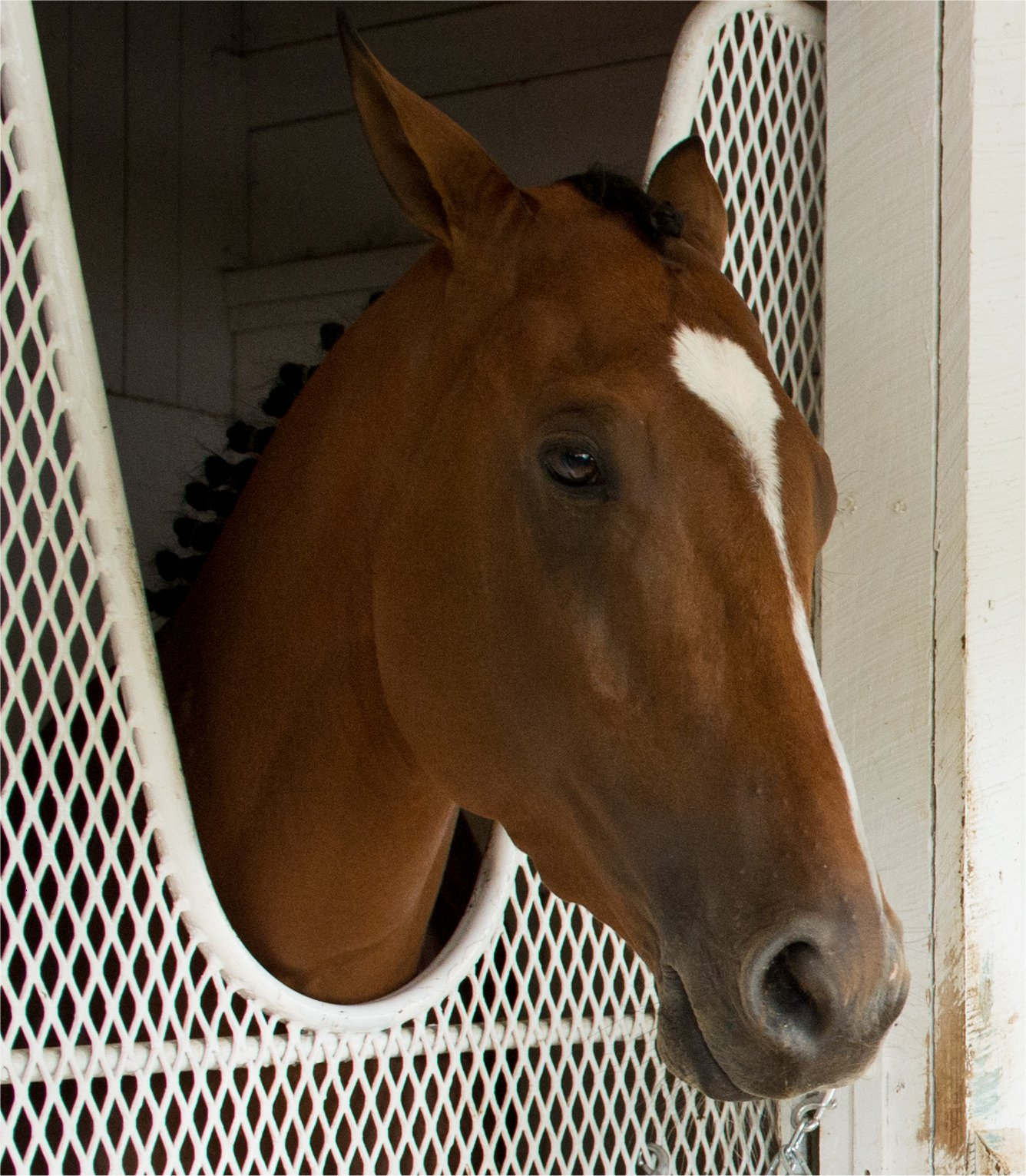
- Goldencents before the 2013 Preakness Stakes.
- Sire: Into Mischief
- Grandsire: Harlan's Holiday
- Dam: Golden Works
- Damsire: Banker's Gold
- Sex: Colt
- Foaled: March 7, 2010
- Country: United States
- Colour: Bay
- Breeder: Rosecrest Farm & Karyn Pirrello
- Owner: WC Racing, Rap Racing, David Kenney
- Trainer: Doug O'Neill; Leandro Mora
- Record: 18: 7-7-0
- Earnings: $3,044,000

Major wins
- Delta Jackpot Stakes (2012); Sham Stakes (2013); Santa Anita Derby (2013); Breeders' Cup Dirt Mile (2013, 2014); Pat O'Brien Stakes (2014)

Goldencents (foaled March 7, 2010) is an American Thoroughbred racehorse best known for winning consecutive runnings of the Breeders' Cup Dirt Mile. As a two-year-old he ran three times, winning the Delta Jackpot Stakes and finishing second in the Champagne Stakes (United States). In the following year he won the Sham Stakes and the Santa Anita Derby before finishing unplaced in the Kentucky Derby and the Preakness Stakes. He was brought back to sprint distances and ran well without winning before taking the Breeders' Cup Dirt Mile. As a four-year-old he won the Pat O'Brien Stakes and finished second three times before winning his second Breeders' Cup Dirt Mile.

== Background ==
Goldencents is a bay horse with a narrow white blaze and white socks on his hind legs bred in Kentucky by Rosecrest Farm & Karyn Pirrello. He is from the first crop of foals sired by Into Mischief, whose biggest win came as a two-year-old in the 2007 Hollywood Futurity. Goldencents' dam, the Canadian-bred Golden Works, was a distant descendant of Doily, the grand-dam of Sunny's Halo.

Goldencents was consigned to the Fasig-Tipton Kentucky Fall 2011 yearling sale and bought for $5,500 by Webb Carroll. The colt was offered for sale again in June 2012 and bought for $62,000 by Dennis O'Neill. During his racing career Goldencents has been trained by Doug O'Neill and owned by Glenn Sorgenstein's W C Racing with a variety of partners.

== Racing career ==
=== 2012: two-year-old season ===
Goldencents made a successful racecourse debut in a five and half furlong maiden race at Del Mar on September 2, winning by more than seven lengths. In this race he was ridden by Kevin Krigger, who partnered the colt in all his early contests. He was immediately stepped up to Grade I level for the Champagne Stakes (United States) at Belmont Park on October 6. He led early but was overtaken by Shanghai Bobby and finished second, beaten five lengths. On his final appearance of the season, the colt started 13/5 second favorite for the Delta Downs Jackpot Stakes on November 17 and recorded his first major success, beating the favored Bern Identity by one and a quarter lengths.

=== 2013: three-year-old season ===
Goldencents won three of his ten races as a three-year-old in 2013. He began the year with three races at Santa Anita Park. In the Grade III Sham Stakes on January 5, he started as the 2/5 favorite and won by one and a half lengths from Den's Legacy. O'Neill described the winner as "a brilliant athlete and so amazing mentally. He's just getting better every day". After finishing fourth in the San Felipe Stakes in March, he started at odds of 13/2 for the Grade I Santa Anita Derby on April 6. After tracking the leader, Super Ninety Nine, for most of the race, he took the lead in the straight and won by one and a quarter lengths from the favored Flashback. Krigger, who was recording his first Grade I success said, “I've started making history with this horse. This is just the start. As long as I can get him to relax, his potential is untapped."

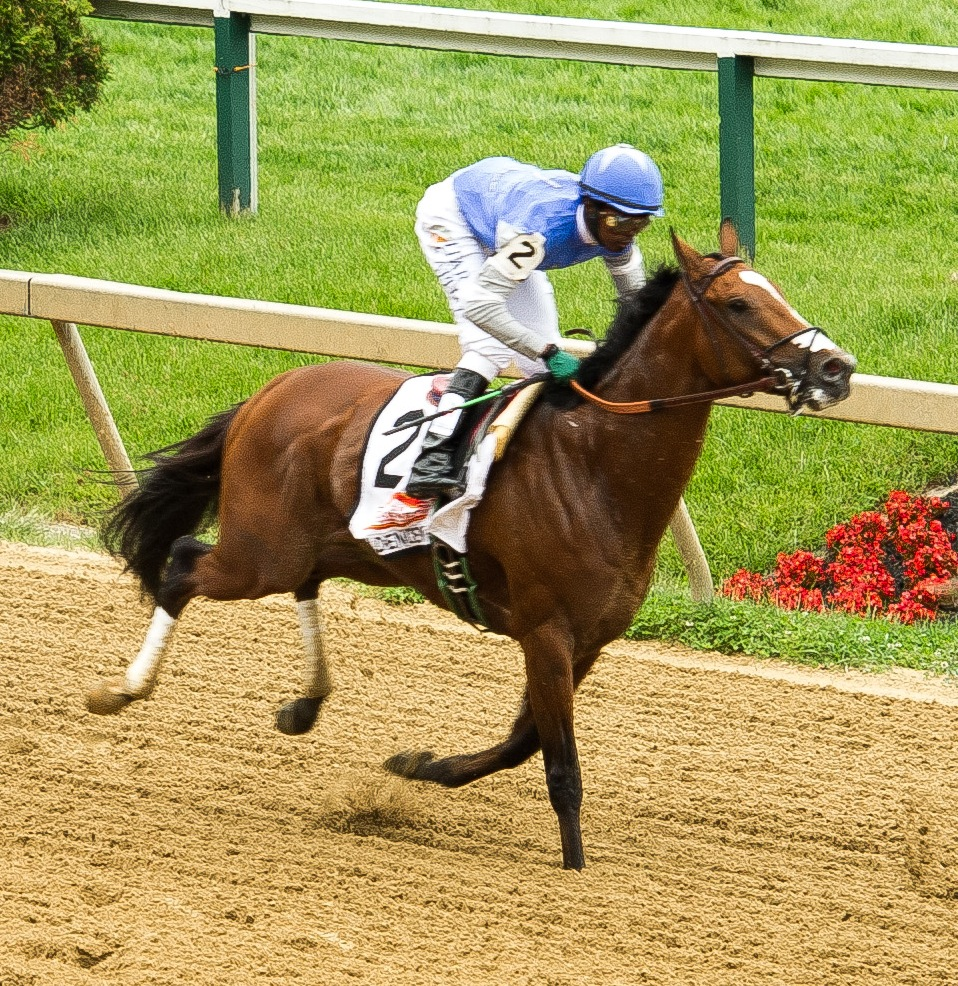
Goldencents at the 2013 Preakness Stakes

In the Kentucky Derby on May 4 at Churchill Downs, the colt started as the 7.9/1 third choice in the betting, but after racing prominently in the early stages he faded badly and finished seventeenth of the nineteen runners behind Orb. Two weeks later, he finished fifth behind Oxbow in the Preakness Stakes.

Goldencents was cut back in distance for the Grade I Bing Crosby Stakes over six furlongs at Del Mar in July and was beaten a head by the four-year-old sprinter Points Offthebench. Pat Valenzuela took over from Krigger when the colt started odds-on favorite for the Grade II Pat O'Brien Stakes over seven furlongs at the same venue a month later. After taking a clear lead in the straight, he was overtaken in the final strides and beaten a length by Fed Biz. Goldencents met Points Offthebench again in the Santa Anita Sprint Championship on October 6. He was favored in the betting but again lost to the older horse, who won by a length.

On November 1 at Santa Anita, Goldencents started at odds of 5/1 for the Breeders' Cup Dirt Mile, in which he was opposed by Verrazano and the 2012 Travers Stakes dead-heaters Alpha and Golden Ticket. Ridden by Rafael Bejarano, he led from the start, set a very fast pace, and won by almost three lengths from Golden Ticket. When asked about his aggressive, front-running tactics, Bejarano said, "It was one of my options to send him right away from the gate. Everything was great. I had a good trip and I had a little pressure in the first turn but it wasn't that bad." Goldencents started favorite for the Cigar Mile Handicap at Aqueduct Racetrack four weeks later but was bumped at the start and failed to reproduce his best form, finishing seventh of the ten runners behind Flat Out.

=== 2014: four-year-old season ===
Goldencents did not reappear as a four-year-old until June 7 when he carried 121 pounds in the Metropolitan Handicap at Belmont. Ridden by Mike Smith, he took the lead a furlong and a half out but was caught 100 yards from the finish and beaten a length into second place by Palace Malice. The colt started 7/10 favourite for the Bing Crosby Handicap, but finished second again, failing by half a length to overhaul the gelding Big Macher after being bumped exiting the gate. Goldencents was then matched against Big Macher and Fed Biz in the Pat O'Brien Stakes. The colt was sent into the lead by Bejarano from the start before accelerating clear of his rivals on the final turn and winning by four and a quarter lengths from the favored Fed Biz. The winning time of 1:20.99 for seven furlongs was a new track record, beating the mark set by Fed Biz in 2013.

For the second year running, Goldencents was the beaten favorite for the Santa Anita Sprint Championship. He proved too good for his American opponents but was caught in the final stride and beaten a nose by the Hong Kong-trained gelding Rich Tapestry. On October 31, Goldencents started 7/10 favorite as he attempted to repeat his 2013 success in the Breeders' Cup Dirt Mile. His official trainer for the race was Doug O'Neill's assistant, Leandro Mora, as O'Neill was serving a suspension under the "convicted trainer's rule" for doping violations. It had already been announced that the race would be Goldencents' last, and that he would begin his stud career at Spendthrift Farm in 2015. As in the previous year, he led from the start and set a strong pace, closely followed by Vicar's in Trouble, with the pair drawing clear of the others. Vicar's in Trouble dropped back soon after and was eased by the 3/4 pole, leaving Goldencents three lengths clear on the final turn. In the straight he held off a challenge from the three-year-old Tapiture to win the race for a second time. Due to the controversy surrounding O'Neill, actress Bo Derek, who is a Commissioner on the California Horse Racing Board, expressed dismay at being trophy presenter for the race. After the race Bejarano said "When Tapiture started coming up, I started to sweat cold again, but then it was all over. But I had so much confidence in this horse this whole week. He's been so kind, so great... so grateful to everything" while Mora commented "it's guts, that's him, he's an old pro."

== Stud career ==
Goldencents stands as a stallion at Spendthrift Farm and has a service fee of US$15,000.

=== Notable progeny ===
Goldencents Grade One winners:

c = colt, f = filly, g = gelding

| Foaled | Name | Sex | Major Wins |
| 2017 | Going To Vegas | f | Rodeo Drive Stakes (2021, 2022) |
| 2020 | Positano Sunset | f | Madison Stakes (2025) |
| 2021 | Mystik Dan | c | 2024 Kentucky Derby |

== Pedigree ==
Pedigree of Goldencents (USA), bay colt, 2010
| Sire Into Mischief (USA) 2005 | Harlan's Holiday (USA); 1999 | Harlan | Storm Cat |
| Sire Into Mischief (USA) 2005 | Harlan's Holiday (USA); 1999 | Harlan | Country Romance |
| Sire Into Mischief (USA) 2005 | Harlan's Holiday (USA); 1999 | Christmas in Aiken | Affirmed |
| Sire Into Mischief (USA) 2005 | Harlan's Holiday (USA); 1999 | Christmas in Aiken | Dowager |
| Sire Into Mischief (USA) 2005 | Leslie's Lady (USA); 1996 | Tricky Creek | Clever Trick |
| Sire Into Mischief (USA) 2005 | Leslie's Lady (USA); 1996 | Tricky Creek | Battle Creek Girl |
| Sire Into Mischief (USA) 2005 | Leslie's Lady (USA); 1996 | Crystal Lady | Stop The Music |
| Sire Into Mischief (USA) 2005 | Leslie's Lady (USA); 1996 | Crystal Lady | One Last Bird |
| Dam Golden Works (CAN) 2000 | Banker's Gold (USA); 1994 | Forty Niner | Mr. Prospector |
| Dam Golden Works (CAN) 2000 | Banker's Gold (USA); 1994 | Forty Niner | File |
| Dam Golden Works (CAN) 2000 | Banker's Gold (USA); 1994 | Bankers Lady | Nijinsky |
| Dam Golden Works (CAN) 2000 | Banker's Gold (USA); 1994 | Bankers Lady | Impetuous Gal |
| Dam Golden Works (CAN) 2000 | Body Works (CAN); 1989 | Bold Ruckus | Boldnesian |
| Dam Golden Works (CAN) 2000 | Body Works (CAN); 1989 | Bold Ruckus | Raise A Ruckus |
| Dam Golden Works (CAN) 2000 | Body Works (CAN); 1989 | Kinto | Kinsman Hope |
| Dam Golden Works (CAN) 2000 | Body Works (CAN); 1989 | Kinto | Where To (Family:4-m) |
