= Oaklawn Mile Stakes =

- Class: Grade III
- Location: Oaklawn Park Race Track; Hot Springs, Arkansas, United States
- Inaugurated: 2019
- Website: Oaklawn Park

Race information
- Distance: 1 mile
- Surface: Dirt
- Track: Left-handed
- Qualification: Four years old and older
- Weight: 124 lbs. with allowances
- Purse: US$500,000 (since 2024)

The Oaklawn Mile Stakes is a Grade III American Thoroughbred horse race for four-year-olds and older at a distance of one mile on the dirt run annually in April at Oaklawn Park Race Track in Hot Springs, Arkansas. The event currently offers a purse of $500,000.

== History ==
The inaugural running of the event was on 3 May 2019 run as the ninth race on the day's card over a distance of one mile on the dirt track. The event was won by Michael M. Hui's Exulting starting at 11/1 winning in a time of 1:36.74.

With increased revenue from the racino the administration of the track in 2019 added stakes events to their racing calendar and created this mile race for older horses.

This event attracted accomplished gallopers such as 2020 Grade I winner Tom's d'Etat and the American Graded Stakes Committee upgraded the status of the event to Grade III for 2022.

== Records ==
Speed record:

- 1:35.83 – Tom's d'Etat (2020)

Margins:

- 1 3/4 length – Hopper (2023)

Most wins by an owner:

- No owner has won the event more than once

Most wins by a jockey:

- No jockey has won the event more than once

Most wins by a trainer:

- 2 – Michael J. Maker (2019, 2024)

== Winners ==
| Year | Winner | Age | Jockey | Trainer | Owner | Distance | Time | Purse | Grade | Ref |
|---|---|---|---|---|---|---|---|---|---|---|
| 2026 | Nu What's New | 4 | Luis Saez | James P. DiVito | Doubledown Stables Inc. | 1 mile | 1:37.34 | $500,000 | III | |
| 2025 | Banishing | 5 | Flavien Prat | David Jacobson | Lawrence P. Roman and David Jacobson | 1 mile | 1:36.77 | $500,000 | III | |
| 2024 | Frosted Grace | 8 | Ramon Vazquez | Michael J. Maker | Flying P Stable | 1 mile | 1:36.61 | $500,000 | III | |
| 2023 | Hopper | 4 | John R. Velazquez | Bob Baffert | Lanni Bloodstock, Madaket Stables & SF Racing | 1 mile | 1:37.63 | $400,000 | III | |
| 2022 | Fulsome | 4 | Florent Geroux | Brad H. Cox | Juddmonte Farms | 1 mile | 1:36.43 | $400,000 | III | |
| 2021 | By My Standards | 5 | Gabriel Saez | W. Bret Calhoun | Allied Racing Stable & Spendthrift Farm | 1 mile | 1:37.82 | $400,000 | Listed | |
| 2020 | Tom's d'Etat | 7 | Joel Rosario | Albert M. Stall Jr. | G M B Racing | 1 mile | 1:35.83 | $150,000 | | |
| 2019 | Exulting | 6 | Richard Eramia | Michael J. Maker | Michael M. Hui | 1 mile | 1:36.74 | $250,000 | | |

== See also ==
- List of American and Canadian Graded races

== External sites ==
Oaklawn Park Media Guide 2020
