= Harlan's Holiday =

American-bred Thoroughbred racehorse

- Sire: Harlan
- Grandsire: Storm Cat
- Dam: Christmas In Aiken
- Damsire: Affirmed
- Sex: Stallion
- Foaled: 1999
- Country: United States
- Color: Bay
- Breeder: Double D Farm Corp.
- Owner: Starlight Stable L.P.
- Trainer: Kenneth McPeek; Todd Pletcher
- Record: 22: 9-6-1
- Earnings: US$ $3,632,664

Major wins
- Cradle Stakes (2001); Iroquois Stakes (2001); Blue Grass Stakes (2002); Florida Derby (2002); Pennsylvania Derby (2002); Donn Handicap (2003)

Honors
- Harlan's Holiday Stakes at Gulfstream Park
- Last updated on 26 April 2020

Harlan's Holiday (April 6, 1999 – November 1, 2013) was an American Thoroughbred racehorse who won three Grade 1 stakes before retiring to stud where he had become a successful sire.

== Background ==
Harlan's Holiday was a bay horse bred by Double D Farm Corp. He was originally sent into training with Kenneth McPeek. He was sired by the Vosburgh Stakes winner Harlan, whose other progeny have included the Haskell Invitational Stakes winner Menifee.

== Racing career ==
=== 2001: two-year-old season ===
As a two-year-old, Harlan's Holiday won the Cradle Stakes at River Downs Racetrack and finished second to Siphonic in the Breeders' Futurity Stakes at Keeneland in October. His most significant performance of 2001 came on 4 November at Churchill Downs when he contested the one-mile Iroquois Stakes. Ridden by A. J. d'Amico, he won the Grade III event by two and three quarter lengths from Request for Parole.

=== 2002: three-year-old season ===
In 2002, Harlan' Holiday established himself as a leading contender for the Triple Crown races. After narrowly losing to Booklet in the Fountain of Youth Stakes, he won the Florida Derby by three and a half lengths and the Blue Grass Stakes by four and a half lengths.

Harlan's Holiday went into the 2002 Kentucky Derby as the betting favorite but finished seventh to winner War Emblem. He then finished fourth to War Emblem in the Preakness Stakes. In early June, 2002, Harlan's Holiday's trainer was changed to Todd Pletcher.

In the autumn, he won the Pennsylvania Derby at Parx and finished third to Evening Attire in the Jockey Club Gold Cup before finishing unplaced in the Breeders' Cup Classic.

=== 2003: four-year-old season ===
Harlan's Holiday began his four-year-old season by winning a nine-furlong allowance race at Gulfstream Park on February 2. He then won the Grade I Donn Handicap over the same course and distance three weeks later, beating Hero's Tribute by two and a half lengths. He was then sent to Nad Al Sheba Racecourse for the Dubai World Cup, in which he lost by five lengths to Moon Ballad.

== Stud record ==
Harlan's Holiday was the Champion juvenile sire of 2012, a year in which he established a North American record for 2-year-old earnings of $2,954,556.

Among Harlan's Holiday's progeny are Shanghai Bobby, the 2012 American Champion Two-Year-Old Colt; Denis of Cork, in 2008 a second-place finisher in the Belmont Stakes and third-place finisher in the Preakness Stakes; Willcox Inn, winner of the 2011 American Derby, Hawthorne Derby, and Arlington Classic; and Into Mischief, seven straight times leading sire in North America (2019–2025).

In late 2010, WinStar Farm became a part-owner of Harlan's Holiday, and he was moved to their breeding operation near Versailles, Kentucky.

Harlan's Holiday's stud career is profiled in the June 22, 2013, issue of The Blood-Horse.

On November 1, 2013, Harlan's Holiday suddenly collapsed after returning to his stall, having lost use of his hind end. His intestine prolapsed from his rectum, and he went into shock. After multiple attempts to repair the prolapse, the horse was euthanized.

== Pedigree ==
Pedigree of Harlan's Holiday (USA), bay stallion, 1999
Sire Harlan (USA) 1989	Storm Cat (USA); 1983	Storm Bird	Northern Dancer
Sire Harlan (USA) 1989	Storm Cat (USA); 1983	Storm Bird	South Ocean
Sire Harlan (USA) 1989	Storm Cat (USA); 1983	Terlingua	Secretariat
Sire Harlan (USA) 1989	Storm Cat (USA); 1983	Terlingua	Crimson Saint
Sire Harlan (USA) 1989	Country Romance (CAN); 1976	Halo	Hail to Reason
Sire Harlan (USA) 1989	Country Romance (CAN); 1976	Halo	Cosmah
Sire Harlan (USA) 1989	Country Romance (CAN); 1976	Sweet Romance	Gun Bow
Sire Harlan (USA) 1989	Country Romance (CAN); 1976	Sweet Romance	Suiti
Dam Christmas in Aiken (USA) 1992	Affirmed (USA); 1975	Exclusive Native	Raise a Native
Dam Christmas in Aiken (USA) 1992	Affirmed (USA); 1975	Exclusive Native	Exclusive
Dam Christmas in Aiken (USA) 1992	Affirmed (USA); 1975	Won't Tell You	Crafty Admiral
Dam Christmas in Aiken (USA) 1992	Affirmed (USA); 1975	Won't Tell You	Scarlet Ribbon
Dam Christmas in Aiken (USA) 1992	Dowager (USA); 1980	Honest Pleasure	What a Pleasure
Dam Christmas in Aiken (USA) 1992	Dowager (USA); 1980	Honest Pleasure	Tularia
Dam Christmas in Aiken (USA) 1992	Dowager (USA); 1980	Princessnesian	Princequillo
Dam Christmas in Aiken (USA) 1992	Dowager (USA); 1980	Princessnesian	Alanesian (Family: 4-m)
