= 2024 Road to the Kentucky Derby =

Thoroughbred horse racing series

The 2024 Road to the Kentucky Derby is a series of races through which horses qualified for the 2024 Kentucky Derby, which was held on May 4. The field for the Derby was limited to 20 horses, with up to four 'also eligibles' in case of a late withdrawal from the field. There were three separate paths for horses to take to qualify for the Derby: the main Road consisting of races in North America (plus one in Dubai), the Japan Road consisting of four races in Japan, and the European road consisting of seven races in England, Ireland and France. The top five finishers in the specified races received points, with higher points awarded in the major prep races in March and April. Earnings in non-restricted stakes races acted as a tie breaker.

For 2024, there are several changes in the Road to the Kentucky Derby. In the 2023 Road to the Kentucky Derby, there were of 37 races, with 22 races for the Kentucky Derby Prep Season and 15 races for the Kentucky Derby Championship Season. In 2024, the following changes were introduced: (Note: See the following list for details)

- Second-place points in all qualifying races have been increased to create added separation from second and third-place finishers
- Third- and fourth-place points in races that award 100 points to winner have been decreased from 100-40-30-20-10 to 100-50-25-15-10
- The Grade III Street Sense Stakes, held on October 29 at Churchill Downs was added to the Early Prep Season
- The Grade III Sham Stakes was included in the original list of events, but Santa Anita Park did not schedule the event in 2024
- Santa Anita Park decreased the distance of the Robert B. Lewis Stakes from 1 1/16 miles to one mile
- The El Camino Real Derby was removed from the Early Prep Season
- For the Sunland Park Derby at Sunland Park, the qualification points were decreased from 50-20-15-10-5 to 20-10-6-4-2 and the distance of the event was decreased from 1 1/8 to 1 1/16 miles

== Standings ==
The following table shows the points earned in the eligible races for the main series. Entrants that have been nominated are ranked in the standings.

As of May 1, 2024

Rank	Horse	Points	Earnings (Note: Earnings from non-restricted stakes prior to the running of the Kentucky Derby serve as a tie-breaker.)	Trainer	Owner	Ref
1	Sierra Leone	155	$871,250	Chad C. Brown	Derrick Smith, Mrs. John Magnier, Michael Tabor, Westerburg, Brook T. Smith & Peter Brant	
2	Fierceness	136	$1,646,100	Todd A. Pletcher	Repole Stable	
3	Catching Freedom	125	$802,000	Brad H. Cox	Albaugh Family Stables	
4	Stronghold	125	$742,800	Philip D'Amato	Eric M. & Sharon Waller	
5	Resilience	110	$416,000	William I. Mott	Emily Bushnell & Ric Waldman	
6	Forever Young (JPN)	100	$1,769,919	Yoshito Yahagi	Susumu Fujita	
7	Endlessly	100	$658,000	Michael McCarthy	Amerman Racing	
bypassing (Note: Connections of Timberlake have declared that the horse will bypass the Kentucky Derby)	Timberlake	81	$1,132,500	Brad H. Cox	WinStar Farm & Siena Farm	
8	Dornoch	75	$472,375	Danny Gargan	West Paces Racing, R. A. Hill Stable, Belmar Racing and Breeding, Two Eight Racing & Pine Racing Stables	
9	Just a Touch	75	$247,500	Brad H. Cox	Qatar Racing, Resolute Racing & Marc Detampel	
10	Track Phantom	70	$300,000	Steven M. Asmussen	L and N Racing, Clark O. Brewster, Jerry Caroom & Breeze Easy	
11	West Saratoga	67	$363,640	Larry Demeritte	Harry L. Veruchi	
12	Just Steel	65	$628,295	D. Wayne Lukas	BC Stables	
13	Honor Marie (Note: Honor Marie was originally owned by Legion Racing who sold the horse to Ribble Farms. After winning the Kentucky Jockey Club Stakes, in 2024 additional part-owners were added.)	65	$448,455	Whitworth D. Beckman	Ribble Farms, Michael H. Eiserman, Earl I. Silver, Kenneth E. & Daniel Fishbein	
14	Domestic Product	60	$260,500	Chad C. Brown	Klaravich Stables	
15	Catalytic	50	$186,000	Saffie Joseph Jr.	Tami Bobo, Julie Davies & George G. Isaacs	
bypassing (Note: Connections of Deterministic have decided that the horse will bypass the Kentucky Derby)	Deterministic	50	$180,000	Christophe Clement	St. Elias Stable, Ken Langone, C. Steven Duncker & Vicarage Stable	
16	Society Man (Note: Originally, Society Man was owned by West Racing, Danny Gargan & GMP Stables, but after the Wood Memorial, Danny Gargan sold his part and West Racing also sold a partial interest to form a new partnership)	50	$141,875	Danny Gargan	West Racing, Dean & Patti Reeves, Carl & Yurie Pascarella & GMP Stables	
17	Mystik Dan	46	$550,050	Kenneth G. McPeek	Lance Gasaway, 4 G Racing & Daniel Hamby	
injured (Note: No More Time after a workout on April 14 suffered an injury and x-rays revealed a condylar fracture of the left front leg)	No More Time	45	$194,380	Jose D'Angelo	Morplay Racing	
18–scratched (Note: Encino drew into the starting field but was scratched after training on April 30 when he was considered "off", and "diagnosed with a soft tissue strain that will require 30 days off".)	Encino	40	$323,880	Brad H. Cox	Godolphin Racing	
19	Grand Mo the First	40	$164,250	Victor Barboza Jr.	Granpollo Stables	
bypassing	Common Defense	37	$253,450	Kenneth G. McPeek	David A. Bernsen, Michael & Tony Holmes & Norevale Farm	
20	T O Password (JPN) (Note: T O Password accepted as Japan Road to the Kentucky Derby qualifier)	Japan	$120,474	Daisuke Takayanagi	Tomoya Ozasa	
21 (Note: Epic Ride entered the Kentucky Derby field as an also eligible, but after the scratching of Encino enters the Kentucky Derby as a starter)	Epic Ride	35	$198,654	John Ennis	Welch Racing	
bypassing	Hades	30	$193,550	Joseph Orseno	D. J. Stable & Robert Cotran	
bypassing	Uncle Heavy	30	$167,500	Robert E. Reid Jr.	Michael Milam	
bypassing	El Grande O	30	$151,000	Linda Rice	Barry K. Schwartz	
bypassing	Seize the Grey	27	$113,163	D. Wayne Lukas	MyRacehorse	
bypassing	Le Dom Bro (Note: Originally Le Dom Bro was not nominated for the Triple Crown, but after his placing in the Fountain Of The Youth Stakes connections paid the late payment fee for nomination to the Triple Crown)	25	$131,000	Eniel Cordero	Vicente Stella Stables	
not nominated	E J Won the Cup	25	$126,000	Doug F. O'Neill	Superfecta King Stable	
bypassing	Pandagate	25	$100,206	Christophe Clement	Adelphi Racing Club, Madaket Stables, Corms Racing Stable & On The Rise	
bypassing	Tuscan Gold	25	$100,000	Chad C. Brown	William H. Lawrence, Walmac Farm & Stonestreet Stables	
bypassing	Protective	25	$75,000	Todd A. Pletcher	Repole Stable	
injured	Locked	19	$538,050	Todd A. Pletcher	Eclipse Thoroughbred Partners & Walmac Farm	
bypassing	Liberal Arts	19	$262,825	Robert Medina	Evan & Stephen Ferraro	
bypassing	Curlin's Kaos	19	$64,400	Antonio Garcia	Zephyr Racing & Alfred Pais	
bypassing	Mc Vay	19	$48,500	John Shirreffs	C R K Stable	
bypassing	Informed Patriot	18	$225,140	Steven M. Asmussen	J. Kirk Robison & Judy Robison	
bypassing	Northern Flame	18	$143,800	Kenneth G. McPeek	John C. Oxley, Harold Lerner & AWC Stables	
bypassing	Lucky Jeremy	16	$124,200	William Morey	Jeremy Ramsland	
bypassing	Scatify	16	$42,000	John W. Sadler	West Point Thoroughbreds	
bypassing	The Wine Steward	15	$276,010	Michael J. Maker	Paradise Farms & David Staudacher	
bypassing	Mendelssohn Bay	15	$164,366	Bhupat Seemar	Suited & Booted Racing Syndicate	
not nominated	Frankie's Empire	15	$163,100	Michael Yates	Frank DeLuca	
bypassing	Lonesome Boy	15	$94,314	Hugo Padilla	Pat Chinn & Mullan Chinn	
bypassing	Triple Espresso	15	$76,600	Todd A. Pletcher	Repole Stable & St. Elias Stables	
bypassing	Conquest Warrior	15	$46,500	Claude R. McGaughey III	Courtlandt Farms	
22 (Note: Mugatu entered the Kentucky Derby field as an also eligible)	Mugatu	14	$30,107	Jeff Engler	Average Joe Racing Stables & Dan Wells	
bypassing	Nash	13	$164,000	Brad H. Cox	Godolphin Racing	
injured	Drum Roll Please	13	$112,500	Brad H. Cox	Gold Square	
bypassing	Agate Road	10	$214,750	Todd A. Pletcher	Repole Stable & St. Elias Stables	
bypassing	Otto the Conqueror	10	$207,500	Steven M. Asmussen	Three Chimneys Farm	
bypassing	Alotaluck	10	$180,360	Ty Garrett	Eleanor Martin	
bypassing	Dancing Groom	10	$88,902	Antonio Sano	Eduardo Soto	
not nominated	Woodcourt	10	$79,275	Cipriano Contreras	Contreras Stable	
bypassing	Maximus Meridius	10	$48,000	Robert Reid Jr.	LC Racing, Cash is King & Robert Reid Jr.	
bypassing	Navy Seal	10	$42,668	Aidan O'Brien	Derrick Smith, Mrs. John Magnier & Michael Tabor	
bypassing	Tapalo	10	$35,000	John W. Sadler	Saratoga Glen Farm	
bypassing	Real Macho	10	$30,000	Rohan Crichton	Reeves Thoroughbred Racing, Rohan Crichton, Daniel L. Walters & Dennis Smith	
bypassing	Good Money	10	$30,000	Chad C. Brown	Calumet Farm	
not nominated	Risk It	8	$83,838	Steven M. Asmussen	Winchell Thoroughbreds & Three Chimneys Farm	
bypassing	Moonlight	7	$59,000	Todd A. Pletcher	Town and Country Racing & Madaket Stables	
bypassing	Lat Long	6	$36,500	Kenneth G. McPeek	Walking L Thoroughbreds	
bypassing	Lightline	6	$31,500	Brad H. Cox	Albaugh Family Stables	
not nominated	Dilger (IRE)	6	$29,400	Saffie Joseph Jr.	Michael J. Ryan	
bypassing	Blue Eyed George	6	$27,740	Michael McCarthy	BG Stables	
not nominated	Glengarry	5	$332,025	Doug Anderson	Aaron Kennedy, Toby Joseph & Doug Anderson	
not nominated	General Partner	5	$140,000	Chad C. Brown	Klaravich Stables	
bypassing	Real Men Violin	5	$82,050	Kenneth G. McPeek	Tilted Shamrock Stables	
bypassing	Dimatic	5	$78,750	Steven M. Asmussen	Winchell Thoroughbreds	
bypassing	Awesome Road	5	$60,008	Brad H. Cox	Albaugh Family Stables	
bypassing	Khanate	5	$28,000	Todd A. Pletcher	Calumet Farm	
inactive (Note: Off the Derby Trail)	Snead	5	$20,000	Brendan Walsh	Imagine Racing & Margaret Fauber	
bypassing	Capital Idea	5	$12,000	Christophe Clement	Reeves Thoroughbred Racing	
bypassing	Heartened	5	$10,500	Todd A. Pletcher	St. Elias Stable, Ken Langone, Steven C. Duncker & Vicarage Stable	
bypassing	Inveigled	4	$72,250	Jane Cibelli	Mark B. Grier	
bypassing	Footprint	4	$63,600	Kenneth G. McPeek	Greg McDonald	
bypassing	Elysian Meadows	4	$32,500	William I. Mott	Team Penney Racing	
bypassing	Secret Chat	4	$27,120	Roderick Rodriguez	Gelfenstein Farm	
bypassing	Gettysburg Address	4	$26,200	Brad H. Cox	WinStar Farm & Siena Farm	
bypassing	Deposition	4	$22,500	Uriah St. Louis	Uriah St. Louis	
injured (Note: Off the Derby Trail)	Ethan Energy	4	$8,000	Brad H. Cox	Stonestreet Stables	
not nominated	Magic Grant	3	$134,250	Eddie Milligan Jr.	Willis Horton Racing	
bypassing	Be You	3	$66,500	Todd A. Pletcher	Repole Stable	
not nominated	Generous Tipper	3	$57,750	Kenneth G. McPeek	Walking L Thoroughbreds	
inactive (Note: Off the Derby Trail)	Stretch Ride	3	$39,025	Dale L. Romans	West Point Thoroughbreds	
not nominated	Gold Sweep	2	$149,300	Steven M. Asmussen	Mike McCarty	
not nominated	Raging Torrent	2	$80,000	Doug F. O'Neill	Great Friends Stables & Mark Davis	
bypassing	Fulmineo	2	$61,000	Arnaud Delacour	Starlight Racing & Mark B. Grier	
not nominated	Third Street	2	$25,380	Shawn H. Davis	Shawn H. Davis & Bill Carnes	
inactive (Note: Off the Derby Trail)	Regalo	2	$10,000	Brittany Russell	Harry Papaleo	
bypassing	Moonlit Sonata	2	$8,000	Tim Yakteen	Soma Racing Stable	
inactive (Note: Off the Derby Trail)	Ode to Balius	2	$6,160	Concepcion Torres	Arnaldo Monge	
bypassing	Tizzy Indy	2	$4,000	J. Keith Desormeaux	Calumet Farm	
not nominated	Sweet Soddy J	1	$165,250	Raymond Ginter Jr.	Built Wright Stables	
euthanized	Where's Chris	1	$110,500	Richard E. Dutrow Jr.	Nice Guys Stable	
inactive (Note: Off the Derby Trail)	Air Cav	1	$33,500	Brad H. Cox	Calumet Farm	
not nominated	Rothschild	1	$26,500	Tim Yakteen	SF Racing, Starlight Racing, Madaket Stables, Dianne Bashor, Robert E. Masterson, Waves Edge Capital, Catherine Donovan & Tom Ryan	
not nominated	My Buddy Mel	1	$24,000	Danny Pish	Heider Racing Stables, Duffy's Racing Stable & Striking Stables	
not nominated	Ace of Clubs	1	$19,500	Doug F. O'Neill	RJ Racing, Fritz Brothers Racing, Pappas Horse Racing & Pablo A. Suarez	
inactive (Note: Off the Derby Trail)	Edified	1	$16,797	Steven M. Asmussen	Courtlandt Farms	

Legend:
Qualified for the Derby
Also eligible
Scratched
Injured/Bypassing/Inactive/Not nominated

== Prep season ==
=== Initial prep events ===
Note: 1st=10 points; 2nd=5 points; 3rd=3 points; 4th=2 points; 5th=1 point (except the Breeders' Cup Juvenile: 1st=30 points; 2nd=15 points; 3rd=9 points; 4th=6 points; 5th=3 points)

Race	Distance	Purse	Track	Date	1st	2nd	3rd	4th	5th	Ref
Iroquois	1 mile	$300,000	Churchill Downs	Sep 16 2023	West Saratoga	Risk It	Liberal Arts	Seize the Grey	Edified	
Champagne	1 mile	$500,000	Aqueduct	Oct 7 2023	Timberlake	General Partner	Dancing Groom	Gold Sweep	Air Cav	
American Pharoah	1 1/16 miles	$301,500	Santa Anita	Oct 7 2023	Muth (Note: Horse trained by an individual suspended from the 2024 Kentucky Derby does not receive any qualification points. Muth and Wine Me Up are trained by Bob Baffert who is suspended by Churchill Downs Inc. through 2024.)	Wine Me Up	Be You	Raging Torrent	Rothschild	
Breeders' Futurity	1 1/16 miles	$580,750	Keeneland	Oct 7 2023	Locked	The Wine Steward	Generous Tipper	Northern Flame	West Saratoga	
Street Sense	1 1/16 miles	$199,000	Churchill Downs	Oct 29 2023	Liberal Arts	Moonlight	Informed Patriot	Gettysburg Address	Northern Flame	
Breeders' Cup Juvenile	1 1/16 miles	$2,000,000	Santa Anita	Nov 3 2023	Fierceness	Muth (Note: Horse trained by an individual suspended from the 2024 Kentucky Derby does not receive any qualification points. Muth and Prince of Monaco are trained by Bob Baffert who is suspended by Churchill Downs Inc. through 2024.)	Locked	Timberlake	Prince of Monaco	
Kentucky Jockey Club	1 1/16 miles	$400,000	Churchill Downs	Nov 25 2023	Honor Marie	Real Men Violin	Stretch Ride	Risk It	Awesome Road	
Remsen	1 1/8 miles	$250,000	Aqueduct	Dec 2 2023	Dornoch	Sierra Leone	Drum Roll Please	Moonlight	Where's Chris	
Springboard Mile	1 mile	$300,000	Remington	Dec 15 2023	Otto the Conqueror	Glengarry	Magic Grant	Third Street	My Buddy Mel	
Los Alamitos Futurity	1 1/16 miles	$200,000	Los Alamitos	Dec 16 2023	Wynstock (Note: Horse trained by an individual suspended from the 2024 Kentucky Derby does not receive any qualification points. Wynstock, Coach Prime and Wine Me Up are trained by Bob Baffert who is suspended by Churchill Downs Inc. through 2024.)	Stronghold	Coach Prime	Wine Me Up	Ace of Clubs	
Gun Runner Stakes	1 1/16 miles	$98,000	Fair Grounds	Dec 23 2023	Track Phantom	Snead	Nash	Footprint	Risk It	
Smarty Jones	1 mile	$300,000	Oaklawn	Jan 1 2024	Catching Freedom	Just Steel	Informed Patriot	Gettysburg Address	Mystik Dan	
Jerome	1 mile	$145,500	Aqueduct	Jan 6 2024	Drum Roll Please	El Grande O	Khanate	Regalo	Sweet Soddy J	
~~Sham~~	~~1 mile~~	~~$100,000~~	~~Santa Anita~~	~~Jan 7 2024~~	Race not scheduled (Note: Originally the Sham Stakes was on the list of qualification event on the Road to the Kentucky Derby, but later Santa Anita Park announced their stakes schedule for the 2023–24 winter season and they did not schedule the Sham Stakes in 2024)					

=== Select prep events ===
Note: 1st=20 points; 2nd=10 points; 3rd=6 points; 4th=4 points; 5th=2 points

Race	Distance	Purse	Grade	Track	Date	1st	2nd	3rd	4th	5th	Ref
Lecomte	1 1/16 miles	$194,000	3	Fair Grounds	Jan 20 2024	Track Phantom	Nash	Lat Long	Ethan Energy	Tizzy Indy	
Southwest	1 1/16 miles	$800,000	3	Oaklawn	Feb 3 2024 (Note: Originally the Southwest Stakes was scheduled for January 27, 2024 but due to a cancellation of racing from January 19–21 at Oaklawn Park, the administration of the track moved all events back one week.)	Mystik Dan	Just Steel	Liberal Arts	Awesome Road	Common Defense	
Holy Bull	1 1/16 miles	$260,000	3	Gulfstream	Feb 3 2024	Hades	Domestic Product	Fierceness	Inveigled	Dancing Groom	
Robert B. Lewis (Note: In 2024 the distance of the Robert B. Lewis Stakes was decreased from 1 1/16 miles to one mile)	1 mile	$201,000	3	Santa Anita	Feb 3 2024	Nysos (Note: Horse trained by an individual suspended from the 2024 Kentucky Derby does not receive any qualification points. Nysos and Wine Me Up are trained by Bob Baffert who is suspended by Churchill Downs Inc. through 2024.)	Wine Me Up	Scatify	Mc Vay	Moonlit Sonata	
Withers	1 1/8 miles	$250,000	3	Aqueduct	Feb 3 2024	Uncle Heavy	El Grande O	Lightline	Deposition	Khanate	
Sam F. Davis Stakes	1 1/16 miles	$200,000	3	Tampa Bay	Feb 10 2024	No More Time	Agate Road	West Saratoga	Elysian Meadows	Fulmineo	
Sunland Park Derby (Note: In 2024 the distance of the Sunland Park Derby was decreased from 1 1/8 miles to 1 1/16 miles)	1 1/16 miles	$400,000	3	Sunland Park	Feb 18 2024	Stronghold	Alotaluck	Lucky Jeremy	Curlin's Kaos	Informed Patriot	
John Battaglia Memorial	1 1/16 miles	$142,500		Turfway	Mar 2 2024	Encino	Epic Ride	Blue Eyed George	Mugatu	Ode to Balius	

== Championship series events ==
=== First leg of series ===
Note: 1st=50 points; 2nd=25 points; 3rd=15 points; 4th=10 points; 5th=5 points

Race	Distance	Purse	Grade	Track	Date	1st	2nd	3rd	4th	5th	Ref
Risen Star	1 1/8 miles	$400,000	2	Fair Grounds	Feb 17 2024	Sierra Leone	Track Phantom	Catching Freedom	Resilience	Honor Marie	
Rebel	1 1/16 miles	$1,250,000	2	Oaklawn	Feb 24 2024	Timberlake	Common Defense	Northern Flame	Woodcourt	Dimatic	
Fountain of Youth	1 1/16 miles	$400,000	2	Gulfstream	Mar 2 2024	Dornoch	Le Dom Bro	Frankie's Empire	Real Macho	Dancing Groom	
Gotham	1 mile	$300,000	3	Aqueduct	Mar 2 2024	Deterministic	Just a Touch	El Grande O	Maximus Meridius	Capital Idea	
San Felipe	1 1/16 miles	$294,000	2	Santa Anita	Mar 3 2024 (Note: Originally, the San Felipe Stakes was scheduled to be held on March 2, 2024, but due to expected inclement weather forecasted for that day the track's administration moved the day's meeting to Sunday, March 3, 2024)	Imagination (Note: Horse trained by an individual suspended from the 2024 Kentucky Derby does not receive any qualification points. Imagination and Wine Me Up are trained by Bob Baffert who is suspended by Churchill Downs Inc. through 2024.)	Wine Me Up	Mc Vay	Scatify	—	
Tampa Bay Derby (Note: The Tampa Bay Derby was held with limited betting due to failure of the totalisator system)	1 1/16 miles	$350,000	2	Tampa Bay	Mar 9 2024	Domestic Product	No More Time	Grand Mo the First	Good Money	Heartened	

=== Second leg of series ===
These races are the major preps for the Kentucky Derby, and are thus weighted more heavily.
Note: 1st=100 points; 2nd=50 points; 3rd=25 points; 4th=15 points; 5th=10 points

Race	Distance	Purse	Grade	Track	Date	1st	2nd	3rd	4th	5th	Ref
Louisiana Derby	1 3/16 miles	$1,000,000	2	Fair Grounds	Mar 23 2024	Catching Freedom	Honor Marie	Tuscan Gold	Track Phantom	Common Defense	
Jeff Ruby	1 1/8 miles	$700,000	3	Turfway	Mar 23 2024	Endlessly	West Saratoga	Seize the Grey	Triple Espresso	Lucky Jeremy	
UAE Derby	1,900 metres (~1 3/16 miles)	$1,000,000	2	Meydan	Mar 30 2024	Forever Young	Auto Bahn (Note: As a four-year-old Southern Hemisphere bred, Auto Bahn is ineligible to enter the Kentucky Derby. Thus he was not awarded any qualification points)	Pandagate	Mendelssohn Bay	Navy Seal	
Florida Derby	1 1/8 miles	$1,000,000	1	Gulfstream	Mar 30 2024	Fierceness	Catalytic	Grand Mo The First	Conquest Warrior	Hades	
Arkansas Derby	1 1/8 miles	$1,500,000	1	Oaklawn Park	Mar 30 2024	Muth (Note: Horse trained by an individual suspended from the 2024 Kentucky Derby does not receive any qualification points. Muth is trained by Bob Baffert who is suspended by Churchill Downs Inc. through 2024.)	Just Steel	Mystik Dan	Timberlake	Informed Patriot	
Blue Grass Stakes	1 1/8 miles	$995,782	1	Keeneland	Apr 6 2024	Sierra Leone	Just a Touch	Epic Ride	Dornoch	Mugatu	
Santa Anita Derby	1 1/8 miles	$750,000	1	Santa Anita	Apr 6 2024	Stronghold	Imagination (Note: Horse trained by an individual suspended from the 2024 Kentucky Derby does not receive any qualification points. Imagination is trained by Bob Baffert who is suspended by Churchill Downs Inc. through 2024.)	E J Won the Cup	Curlin's Kaos	Tapalo	
Wood Memorial	1 1/8 miles	$750,000	2	Aqueduct	Apr 6 2024	Resilience	Society Man	Protective	Lonesome Boy	Uncle Heavy	

=== "Wild Card" events ===
Note: 1st=20 points; 2nd=10 points; 3rd=6 points; 4th=4 points; 5th=2 points

Race	Distance	Purse	Track	Date	1st	2nd	3rd	4th	5th	Ref
Lexington	1 1/8 miles	$365,500	Keeneland	Apr 13 2024	Encino	The Wine Steward	Dilger (IRE)	Secret Chat	Footprint	

== European Road to the Kentucky Derby ==
The European Road to the Kentucky Derby is designed on a similar basis to the Japan Road and is intended to provide a place in the Derby starting gate to the top finisher in the series. If the connections of that horse decline the invitation, their place is offered to the second-place finisher and so on. If neither of the top four accept, this place in the starting gate reverts to the horses on the main road to the Derby.

The series consists of seven races – four run on the turf in late 2023 when the horses are age two, plus three races run on a synthetic surface in early 2024.

Race	Distance	Track	Date	1st	2nd	3rd	4th	5th	Ref
Beresford Stakes	1 mile	The Curragh	Sep 23 2023	Deepone	Chief Little Rock	Grosvenor Square	Navy Seal	Stromberg	
Royal Lodge Stakes	1 mile	Newmarket	Sep 30 2023	Ghostwriter	Al Musmak	Capulet	Macduff	Son	
Prix Jean-Luc Lagardère	1,400 metres (about 7 furlongs)	Longchamp	Oct 1 2023	Rosallion	Unquestionable	Beauvatier	Henry Adams	Zabiari	
Kameko Futurity Trophy	1 mile	Doncaster	Oct 28 2023	Ancient Wisdom	Devil's Point	God's Window	Deira Mile	Dancing Gemini	
European Road to the Kentucky Derby Conditions Stakes	1 mile	Kempton Park	Feb 21 2024	Notable Speech	Cuban Tiger	Solomon	Arctic Thunder	Blown Away	
Patton Stakes (Note: There were only three starters in the Patton Stakes)	1 mile	Dundalk	Mar 1 2024	Bergamasco	Nerano	Navy Seal	—	—	
Cardinal Stakes	1 mile	Chelmsford City	Apr 6 2024	Bracken's Laugh	Orne	Capulet	Under The Sun	Bergamasco	

Note:

- the four races in 2023 for two-year-olds: 1st=10 points; 2nd=5 points; 3rd=3 points; 4th=2 points; 5th=1 point
- the first two races in 2024: 1st=20 points; 2nd=10 points; 3rd=6 points; 4th=4 points; 5th=2 points
- The Cardinal Condition Stakes: 1st=30 points; 2nd=15 points; 3rd=9 points; 4th=6 points 5th=3 points

Qualification Table

The top four horses (colored brown within the standings) are eligible to participate in the Kentucky Derby provided the horse is nominated.

Rank	Horse	Points	Eligible Earnings	Trainer	Owner	Ref
not nominated	Bracken's Laugh	30	$7,577	Richard Hughes	Bernardine & Sean Mulryan	
not nominated	Bergamasco	23	$0	Jack Davison	JPD Partnership	
not nominated	Notable Speech	20	$0	Charlie Appleby	Godolphin	
not nominated	Orne	15	$141,212	John & Thady Gosden	Al Shaqab Racing	
not nominated	Capulet	12	$46,909	Aidan O'Brien	Derrick Smith, Mrs. John Magnier & Michael Tabor	
not nominated	Rosallion	10	$204,855	Richard Hannon	Shiekh Mohammed Obaid Al Maktoum	
not nominated	Ancient Wisdom	10	$202,894	Charlie Appleby	Godolphin	
not nominated	Deepone	10	$91,103	Paddy Tworney	Vimal Khosla	
not nominated	Ghostwriter	10	$86,506	Clive Cox	J. C. Smith	
not nominated	Nerano	10	$0	Joseph O'Brien	R & S Racing	
not nominated	Cuban Tiger	10	$0	Karl Burke	Shiekh Mohammed Obaid Al Maktoum	
1	Navy Seal	8	$12,688	Aidan O'Brien	Derrick Smith, Mrs. John Magnier & Michael Tabor	

Notes:

- brown highlight – qualified
- grey highlight – did not qualify

== Japan Road to the Kentucky Derby ==
The Japan Road to the Kentucky Derby is intended to provide a place in the Derby starting gate to the top finisher in the series. If the connections of that horse decline the invitation, their place is offered to the second-place finisher and so on through the top five finishers.

Race	Distance	Track	Date	1st	2nd	3rd	4th	5th	Ref
Cattleya Stakes	1,600 metres (~1 mile)	Tokyo Racecourse	Nov 25	Amante Bianco	George Tesoro	Unquenchable	Star Turn	ƒ More Than Once	
Zen-Nippon Nisai Yushun	1,600 metres (~1 mile)	Kawasaki Racecourse	Dec 13	Forever Young	Aigle Noir	Saint Honore	Nasty Weather	Satono Phoenix	
Hyacinth	1,600 metres (~1 mile)	Tokyo Racecourse	Feb 18	Ramjet	Unquenchable	Habire	Logi Adelaide	Chikappa	
Fukuryu	1,800 metres (~1 1/8 miles)	Nakayama Racecourse	Mar 23	T O Password	Arare Tabashiru	Amber Doll	La Oracion	Sunrise Soleil	

Note:
ƒ Filly
Cattleya Sho: 1st=10 points; 2nd=5 points; 3rd=3 points; 4th=2 points; 5th=1 point
Zen-Nippon Nisai Yushun: 1st=20 points; 2nd=10 points; 3rd=6 points; 4th=4 points; 5th=2 points
Hyacinth: 1st=30 points; 2nd=15 points; 3rd=9 points; 4th=6 points; 5th=3 points
Fukuryu : 1st=40 points; 2nd=20 points; 3rd=12 points; 4th=8 points; 5th=4 points

Qualification Table

The top five horses (colored brown within the standings) are eligible to participate in the Kentucky Derby provided the horse is nominated.

Rank	Horse	Points	Eligible Earnings	Trainer	Owner	Ref
1	T O Password	40	$120,474	Daisuke Takayanagi	Tomoya Ozasa	qualified
2	Ramjet	30	$273,343	Shozo Sasaki	Koji Maeda	
3	Forever Young	20	$569,451	Yoshito Yahagi	Susumu Fujita	
4	Arare Tabashiru	20	$168,430	Yasuhiro Nemoto	Mitsuhiro Fukuda	
not nominated	Unquenchable	18	$140,848	Mizuki Takayanagi	Godolphin Racing	
not nominated	Amber Doll	12	$73,941	Tatsuya Yoshioka	Yoshizawa Holdings Co. Ltd.	
5	Aigle Noir	10	$422,168	Hidetaka Otonashi	Shadai Race Horse Co.	
6	Amante Bianco	10	$224,966	Keisuke Miyata	Silk Racing Co. Ltd.	
7	Habire	9	$91,421	Ryo Takei	Shinichi Koga	
not nominated	La Oracion	8	$121,858	Makoto Saito	DMM Dream Club Co. Ltd.	

Notes:

- brown highlight – qualified
- grey highlight – did not qualify

== Controversy ==
Owner Amr Zedan of Grade 1 Arkansas Derby winner Muth, on April 3, filed a temporary injunction that would require Churchill Downs to allow his horse into the Grade 1 Kentucky Derby (G1) field. Muth is trained by Hall of Famer Bob Baffert, who is suspended from entering and racing horses at tracks owned by Churchill Downs. The suspension was extended last summer. On April 18, Jefferson Circuit Judge Mitch Perry denied Zedan's temporary injunction motion after three hearings to schedule matters and hear arguments. Perry's ruling was appealed to the Kentucky Court of Appeals on April 24, but the order was upheld.

== See also ==
- 2025 Road to the Kentucky Derby
