= 2025 Breeders' Cup Classic =

42nd Breeders' Cup Classic
- Breeders' Cup Classic
- Location: Del Mar
- Date: November 1, 2025
- Winning horse: Forever Young
- Winning time: 2:00.19
- Final odds: 3.50
- Jockey: Ryusei Sakai
- Trainer: Yoshito Yahagi
- Owner: Susumu Fujita
- Conditions: Fast
- Surface: Dirt
- Attendance: 35,173

The 2025 Breeder's Cup Classic was the 42nd running of the Breeder's Cup Classic, part of the 2025 Breeder's Cup World Championship program, and the fourth race in the so-called Grand Slam of Thoroughbred racing in North America. It was run on November 1, 2025 at Del Mar Racetrack in Del Mar, California. The race featured a strong field of older horses, including Fierceness, Mindframe, Antiquarian, and 2024 champion Sierra Leone, as well as Japan's Forever Young and leading three-year-olds Journalism and Baeza. Morning-line favorite Sovereignty was scratched earlier in the week due to a fever. Forever Young won the race by a half-length, becoming the first Japanese horse to win the Breeders' Cup Classic.

The Classic is run on dirt at one mile and one-quarter (approximately 2000 m). The purse of $7,000,000 was the highest in North America in 2025. The race is run under weight-for-age conditions, with entrants carrying the following weights:

- Northern Hemisphere three-year-olds: 122 lb
- Southern Hemisphere three-year-olds: 117 lb
- Four-year-olds and up: 126 lb
- Any fillies or mares receive a 3 lb allowance

The race was broadcast on NBC.

== Contenders ==
The Breeders' Cup Classic is open to up to 14 starters, with automatic berths for horses that win one of the designated "Win and You're In" races in the 2025 Breeders' Cup Challenge series. Other horses are ranked by their performances in graded stakes races and by the judgement of a panel of racing experts.

Entries were taken and the post-position draw was held on October 27, after which morning-line odds were released. The leading contenders include:

- Fierceness, the 2023 Breeders' Cup Juvenile, 2024 Florida Derby, 2024 Travers Stakes, and 2025 Pacific Classic Stakes winner. He is the runner up for the 2024 Breeders' Cup Classic
- Sierra Leone, the 2024 Breeders' Cup Classic winner, runner up in the 2024 Kentucky Derby, and winner of the 2025 Whitney Stakes.
- Forever Young, the Japanese horse who won the 2025 Saudi Cup, third in the 2024 Kentucky Derby, 2024 Breeders' Cup Classic, and 2025 Dubai World Cup
- Journalism, the 2025 Santa Anita Derby winner, 2025 Preakness Stakes winner, and 2025 Haskell Stakes. He is also the runner up in the 2025 Kentucky Derby and Belmont Stakes
- Mindframe, the 2025 Churchill Down Stakes and 2025 Stephen Forster Stakes winner. He is also the runner up in the 2024 Belmont Stakes and 2024 Haskell Stakes
- Baeza, the 2025 Pennsylvania Derby winner, second in the 2025 Santa Anita Derby third in the 2025 Kentucky Derby and Belmont Stakes
- Antiquarian, the 2025 Jockey Club Gold Cup winner

== Race description ==
The pacemaker Contrary Thinking broke quickly to set a fast early tempo, opening the quarter mile in 0:23.04 with Japan's Forever Young tracking closely in second and Fierceness holding position along the rail. Contrary Thinking maintained the lead through a half mile in 0:47.97 and six furlongs in 1:10.48, with the field remaining tight as the leading and trailing horse is only six lengths apart. Approaching the far turn, Contrary Thinking faded, allowing Forever Young to take the lead after completing the mile in 1:35.70. Mindframe and Journalism launched inside the challenges at the top of the stretch, while Fierceness found room along the inside to challenge for the lead. Forever Young held a 1 1/2 length advantage with a furlong remaining and repelled a late wide surge from last year's winner Sierra Leone to win by 1/2 length in a final time of 2:00.19 over a fast track. Sierra Leone finished second, a length clear of Fierceness in third with Journalism and Mindframe rounding out the top five.

In a post-race interview with Tospo Keiba, jockey Ryusei Sakai revealed the crucial split-second read that won the race, admitting that he scrapped his initial plan once he saw how the pace was unfolding: "That was the image I had first, but when seeing the front-runner's vibe and Fierceness' vibe, I felt during the race that maybe we could take second place and trap Fierceness inside." By adapting on the fly, Sakai effectively hijacked Sierra Leone's intended rabbit, using Contrary Thinking as a target for Forever Young while pinning Fierceness along the rail. Reflecting on the execution, Sakai noted that training preparation had mirror the exact scenario: "I talked with trainer Yahagi with that image and did the workout, and it went so smoothly it was almost scary, so I rode with all my confidence."

The connections of Sierra Leone and Fierceness offered their own perspectives on how the tactical positioning played out. Chad Brown, the trainer of Sierra Leone stated: "Huge run. Look, the winner ran a terrific race. He was up on the pace and kicked. I think the track played against us today. Not to take anything away from the winner, but it’s been speed all day. I’m so proud of my horse’s effort. So courageous to run against the bias and nearly get there. Listen, him and Forever Young are closely related, and they’ve had a wonderful rivalry from the Derby on and today it was Forever Young’s day to find the winner’s circle and hats off to them. They’ve really done a good job of bringing this horse back and he really fought on. Even though the track played against us, Flavien (Prat) thought he had him measured and Forever Young just found a little more late. A deserving winner. Flavien Prat, the jockey of Sierra Leone said: "I thought I was going to get there and the winner just didn't stop... turning for home, I really thought I was going to make a big run, which he did, but I just couldn't get by the winner." Todd Pletcher, the trainer of Fierceness stated: "He was in a difficult position. He's inside the pacemaker, so you either have to commit to try to make the lead and have a pacemaker pushing you or try to settle into a spot. He settled into a comfortable spot. He seemed like he was handling it pretty well. Johnny said the Japanese horse was kind of pushing him around the far turn. He finally, finally got clear when some horses went on the outside. He got a decent run at him. It wasn't an ideal scenario, but when we drew the one-hole we knew that it kind of handcuffed us a bit. That's just kind of the way it worked out." John Velazquez, the jockey of Fierceness said: "It's part of racing, you know the rabbit is there for a reason, and he wants me to put him in the lead. I can't go with a rabbit, head and head with a rabbit, so I sat there. And then, the rabbit cost me, because he stopped in front of me and that was that."

Forever Young made history as the first Japanese horse to win the Breeders' Cup Classic, achieving a breakthrough in American dirt racing that eluded Japanese contenders for nearly three decades. Japan first targeted the Classic in 1996 with Taiki Blizzard, who finished 13th, and returned in 1997 to finish 6th. Other attempts by runners such as Personal Rush (2004, 6th), Casino Drive (2008, 12th), Espoir City (2010, 10th), Ushba Tesoro (2023, 5th & 2024, 10th) also fell short. Japan came closest in 2023 when Derma Sotogake finished second to White Abarrio, losing by a length and again in 2024 when Forever Young finished third behind Sierra Leone and Fierceness, a result that prompted trainer Yoshito Yahagi to declare: "I want to get revenge on the horses that were first and second placers." Returning to fulfill that promise, Forever Young delivered exactly what Yahagi declared by repelling Sierra Leone and Fierceness to win the title. In the emotional aftermath, Yahagi admitted, "I came here to win. But I couldn't imagine what it would be like when we actually did win this race. In that moment, I was speechless." Jockey Ryusei Sakai reflected on his ride, stating, "The horse was in the best condition, so I only thought about winning. Whatever the situation, I just thought about winning, that was it."

== Results ==
| Finish | Program Number | Horse | Jockey | Trainer | Morning Line Odds | Final Odds | Winnings | Margin |
|---|---|---|---|---|---|---|---|---|
| 1 | 5 | Forever Young (JPN) | Ryusei Sakai | Yoshito Yahagi | 5-1 | 3.50 | $3,640,000 | |
| 2 | 7 | Sierra Leone | Flavien Prat | Chad Brown | 8-1 | 3.50 | $1,190,000 | 1/2 length |
| 3 | 1 | Fierceness | John Velazquez | Todd Pletcher | 4-1 | 2.50* | $630,000 | 1 1/2 lengths |
| 4 | 9 | Journalism | Jose Ortiz | Micheal McCarthy | 10-1 | 5.00 | $350,000 | 3 3/4 lengths |
| 5 | 8 | Mindframe | Irad Ortiz Jr. | Todd Pletcher | 10-1 | 6.00 | $210,000 | 5 lengths |
| 6 | 2 | Baeza | Hector Berrios | John Shirreffs | 15-1 | 10.00 | $70,000 | 8 lengths |
| 7 | 3 | Nevada Beach | Mike Smith | Bob Baffert | 20-1 | 20.00 | $70,000 | 9 lengths |
| 8 | 10 | Antiquarian | Luiz Saez | Todd Pletcher | 15-1 | 10.00 | $70,000 | 13 lengths |
| 9 | 4 | Contrary Thinking | Florent Geroux | Chad Brown | 50-1 | 50.00 | $70,000 | 24 lengths |
| SCR | 6 | Sovereignty | Junior Alvarado | William Mott | 6-5 | - | - | - |

Times: 1/4 - 23.04; 1/2 - 47.97; 3/4 - 1:10.48; mile - 1:35.70; final - 2:00.19
Splits for each quarter-mile: (23.04)(24.93)(22.51)(25.22)(24.49)

== Payout ==
Payout schedule

| Program Number | Horse | Win | Place | Show |
|---|---|---|---|---|
| 5 | Forever Young | $9.00 | $4.80 | $3.20 |
| 7 | Sierra Leone | | $4.60 | $2.80 |
| 1 | Fierceness | | | $3.40 |

- $1 Exacta (5-7) Paid $17.30
- $0.50 Trifecta (5-7-1) Paid $30.10
- $0.10 Superfecta (5-7-1-9) Paid $20.74
