= Blame Stakes =

Grade III Thoroughbred horse race

- Class: Grade III
- Location: Churchill Downs; Louisville, Kentucky, United States
- Inaugurated: 2020
- Race type: Thoroughbred – Flat racing
- Website: Churchill Downs

Race information
- Distance: 1 1/8 miles
- Surface: Dirt
- Track: left-handed
- Qualification: Four-year-olds and older
- Weight: 123 lbs with allowances
- Purse: US$300,000 (since 2026)

The Blame Stakes is a Grade III American Thoroughbred horse race for four-year-olds and older over a distance of 1 1/8 miles on the dirt scheduled annually in late May or early June at Churchill Downs in Louisville, Kentucky. The event currently offers a purse of $300,000.

== History ==
The event is named after Blame, the 2010 U.S. Champion Older Male Horse who won the 2010 Breeders' Cup Classic at Churchill Downs. In February 2020, Churchill Downs announced that a race named in Blame's honor would be run beginning in May 2020 — The Blame Stakes, a prep race for the $500,000 Stephen Foster Stakes (G2) June 27 at Churchill Downs.

The event was inaugurated on 23 May 2020 and run over a distance of one mile and was won by Rupp Racing's Owendale. Owendale starting as second favorite at odds of 7/2 was ridden by jockey Florent Geroux who settled last from the gate, was in the seven path into the lane, rallied down the stretch while widest and edged past three wide in the final stages to win by half a length over longshot Everfast in a time of 1:34.74.

In 2021, the distance for the event was increased to 1 1/8 miles.

In 2023 the event was upgraded by the Thoroughbred Owners and Breeders Association to a Grade III.

== Records ==
Speed record

- 1 1/8 miles: 1:48.45 – Mystik Dan (2025)

Margins

- 1 1/4 lengths – Mystik Dan (2025)
- 1 1/4 lengths – Rattle N Roll (2023)

Most wins by a jockey

- 2 – Florent Geroux (2020, 2024)
- 2 – Brian Hernandez Jr. (2023, 2025)
- 2 – Tyler Gaffalione (2022, 2026)

Most wins by a trainer

- 2 – Brad H. Cox (2020, 2024)

Most wins by an owner

- No owner has won the event more than once

== Winners ==
Year	Winner	Age	Jockey	Trainer	Owner	Distance	Time	Purse	Grade	Ref
2026	Original Sin	4	Tyler Gaffalione	Brendan P. Walsh	Calumet Farm	1 1/8 miles	1:49.39	$290,000	III	
2025	Mystik Dan	4	Brian Hernandez Jr.	Kenneth G. McPeek	Lance Gasaway, 4 G Racing, Daniel Hamby III & Valley View Farm	1 1/8 miles	1:48.45	$270,000	III	
2024	Highland Falls	4	Florent Geroux	Brad H. Cox	Godolphin	1 1/8 miles	1:48.51	$270,000	III	
2023	Rattle N Roll	4	Brian Hernandez Jr.	Kenneth G. McPeek	Lucky Seven Stable	1 1/8 miles	1:48.93	$225,000	III	
2022	Dynamic One	4	Tyler Gaffalione	Todd A. Pletcher	Repole Stable, Phipps Stable & St. Elias Stable	1 1/8 miles	1:48.54	$198,750	Listed	
2021	Mighty Heart (CAN)	4	James Graham	Josie Carroll	Lawrence Cordes	1 1/8 miles	1:50.00	$150,000		
2020	Owendale	4	Florent Geroux	Brad H. Cox	Rupp Racing	1 mile	1:34.74	$100,000		

== See also ==
- List of American and Canadian Graded races
