= Sierra Leone (horse) =

American-bred Thoroughbred racehorse

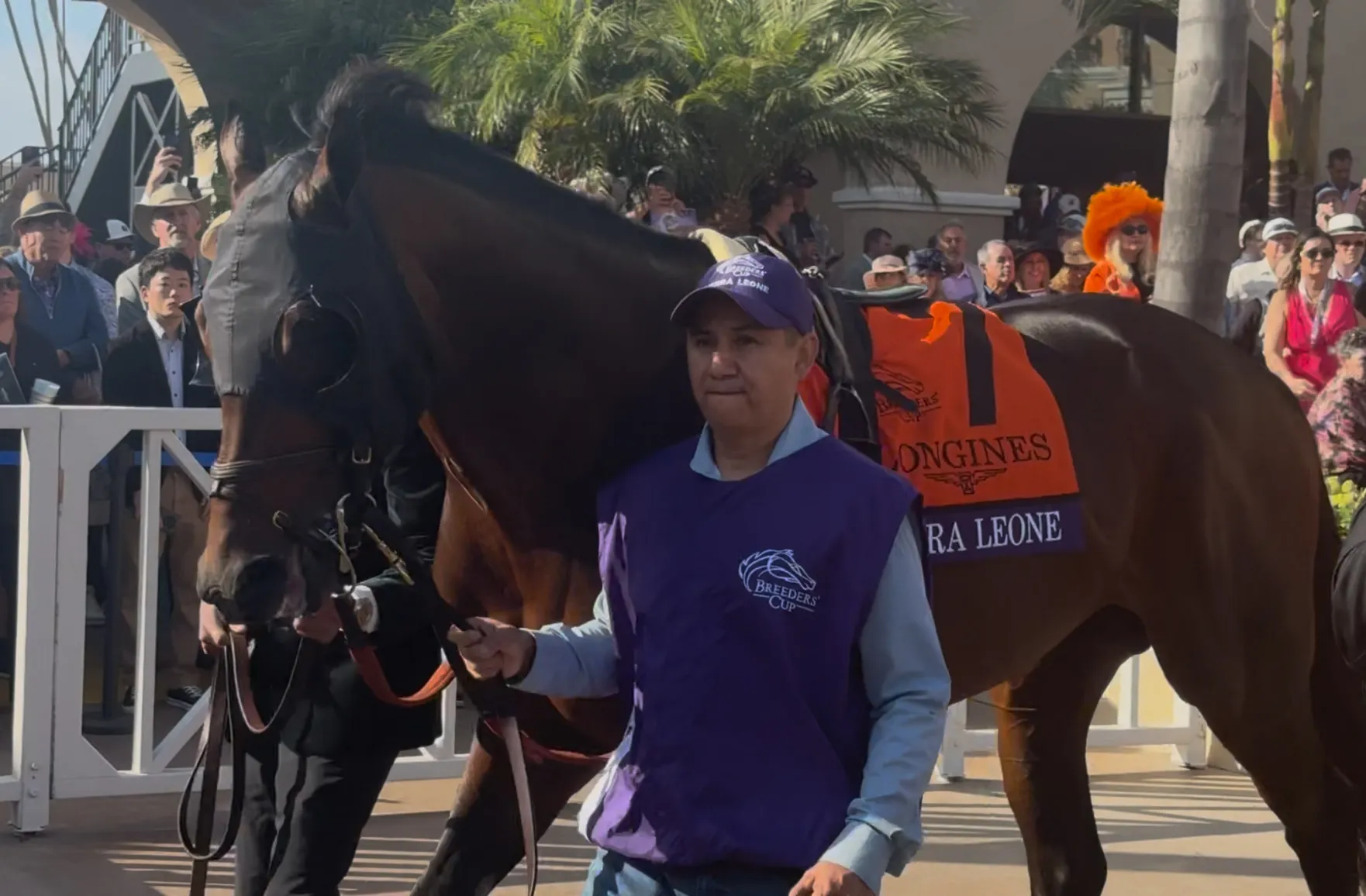
- Sire: Gun Runner
- Grandsire: Candy Ride (ARG)
- Dam: Heavenly Love
- Damsire: Malibu Moon
- Sex: Stallion
- Foaled: March 31, 2021
- Country: United States
- Color: Dark bay or brown
- Breeder: Debby M. Oxley
- Owner: 1. Derrick Smith, Mrs. John Magnier, Michael Tabor, Westerburg, Rocket Ship Racing & Peter Brant (2023); 2. Derrick Smith, Mrs. John Magnier, Michael Tabor, Westerburg, Brook T. Smith & Peter Brant (2024–present)
- Trainer: Chad C. Brown
- Record: 14: 5 - 6 - 3
- Earnings: $8,196,200

Major wins
- Risen Star Stakes (2024); Blue Grass Stakes (2024); Whitney Stakes (2025); Breeders' Cup wins: Breeders' Cup Classic (2024)

Awards
- American Champion Three-Year-Old Male Horse (2024)
- Last updated on November 1, 2025

Sierra Leone (named after the West African country with the same name) (foaled March 31, 2021) is a retired champion American Thoroughbred racehorse. In 2024, as a three-year-old colt, he won the Breeders' Cup Classic.

== Background ==
Sierra Leone is a dark bay or brown stallion who was bred in Kentucky by Debby Oxley. The Oxley family has long been involved with breeding and owner, primarily with John Oxley, Debby's husband.

Oxley family's influence on the breeding of Sierra Leone goes back to the second dam, Darling My Darling, whom John Oxley purchased for $300,000 during the 1998 Keeneland September Yearling Sale. Darling My Darling retired with earnings of $352,359 in 13 efforts with a record of 5–2–1. Darling My Darling went on to produce 14 foals, two of which were graded winning fillies; Forever Darling captured the Grade II Santa Ynez Stakes for her connections, and Heavenly Love, the dam of Sierra Leone won the 2017 Grade I Alcibiades Stakes for the Oxleys and trainer Mark E. Casse. Heavenly Love retired with earnings of $346,200 from 10 starts with a record of 2–0–2.

On August 9, 2022, Sierra Leone, consigned by Gainesway as Hip 202 at the Saratoga Sale, Fasig-Tipton's select yearling sale in Saratoga Springs, N.Y. was sold for US$2.3 million to Coolmore Stud's Michael V. Magnier in partnership with Peter Brant of White Birch Farm. Sierra Leone's sire Gun Runner was the third-ranked sire by both gross ($5,635,000) and average ($704,375) from eight horses sold of nine offered at the sale. In 2023, Gun Runner was the third ranked sire in progeny earnings with $17,532,118. In 2024 Gun Runner stands at Three Chimneys Farm in Kentucky for US$250,000.

In 2023, Coolmore Stud expanded the owner partnership of the horse to include Derrick Smith, Michael Tabor, Westerburg and Rocket Ship Racing. In 2024, Rocket Ship Racing registered back to Brook T. Smith.

Sierra Leone was trained by Chad C. Brown.

== Career ==
=== 2023: two-year-old season ===
Sierra Leone made his debut on November 4 in a maiden special weight event over 1 mile at Aqueduct Racetrack. He broke from post 5, bobbled at the start, was roused three wide on the turn, came five wide into upper stretch, and won with Manuel Franco aboard by one and one-quarter lengths in a time of 1:36.94.

In his next start on December 2, Sierra Leone started in the Grade II Remsen Stakes at Aqueduct Racetrack a Road to the Kentucky Derby prep event over 1 1/8 miles. He dropped back between horses after the start and made a five-wide drive, rallying from last in the field of 10 as the horses entered the stretch. Sierra Leone poked his head in front of leader Dornoch with a furlong to run but the latter fought back and won by a nose in a time of 1:50.30 over a muddy, sealed track.

=== 2024: three-year-old season ===
On February 17, 2024, Sierra Leone began his three-year-old campaign in the Grade II Risen Star Stakes at Fair Grounds Race Course in New Orleans. Starting as the 2/1 favorite, he was unhurried early on and uncorked a winning rally in the stretch, prevailing by a half-length in the 1 1/8-mile event.

In his next start on April 6, in the Grade I Blue Grass Stakes at Keeneland, Sierra Leone did not want to load in the gate, delaying the start by a couple of minutes. He rallied from ninth to overhaul Just a Touch late in the stretch to win by 1 1/2 lengths with his Remsen rival Dornoch finishing fourth. The winning time of 1:50.08 was moderate for the 1 1/8-mile. Jockey Tyler Gaffalione commented after the race,"He has so much ability, and he does things so easily. We haven't even gotten close to the bottom of him yet." He attributed the horse's gate antics to getting worked up as the final horse to load on the far outside in front of a large crowd at Keeneland.

As a result of his wins in the Risen Star Stakes and Blue Grass Stakes, Sierra Leone finished first in the qualification standings in the Road to the Kentucky Derby and entered the Kentucky Derby as one of the favorites. He lost the race by a nose to Mystik Dan in a photo finish.

On June 8, 2024, the Belmont Stakes was held at Saratoga Race Course due to renovations at Belmont Park, with the distance dropped from the usual 1 1/2 miles to 1 1/4 miles. Sierra Leone entered the race as the 9-5 favorite following his narrow second-place finish in the Kentucky Derby. Under jockey Flavien Prat, he finished third, 1½ lengths behind the winner, Dornoch.

Returning to Saratoga Race Course on July 27 for the Grade 2 Jim Dandy Stakes, Sierra Leone trailed in last place early, then made a significant move around the final turn. After a strong inside run, he finished second, one length behind Fierceness.

On August 24, Sierra Leone competed in the Grade 1 Travers Stakes at Saratoga at the 1¼-mile distance. He was far back to start as usual before launching a bid in the stretch. Ultimately, he secured a third-place finish, with Fierceness taking the victory and filly Thorpedo Anna finishing second.

On November 2, 2024, Sierra Leone won the Breeders' Cup Classic, defeating two-year-old champion Fierceness by 1 ½ lengths. After starting near the back of the field, he took advantage of a fast early pace and unleashed a late kick to prevail in a final time of 2:00.78.

=== 2025: four-year-old season ===
In the Grade II New Orleans Classic on March 22, 2025, at Fair Grounds. Sierra Leone, the reigning champion 3-year-old male, finished third. The race was won by Touchuponastar, a Louisiana-bred gelding, who led from start to finish, winning by 2½ lengths over Hall of Fame, with Sierra Leone trailing by 8½ lengths. This unexpected result marked a setback for Sierra Leone in his 4-year-old debut.

On June 28, 2025, Sierra Leone competed in the Grade 1 Stephen Foster Stakes. After settling back early, Sierra Leone unleashed a strong late surge and consistently trailed the front-runners before making up ground in the final furlongs. His effort held off the rest of the field but couldn't quite catch Mindframe down the lane. This performance reaffirmed his elite form and status among America's top older horses.

After a shaky start to his 4-year-old season, Sierra Leone delivered a sensational performance in the Grade I Whitney Stakes on August 2, 2025, at Saratoga. The Chad Brown trainee unleashed his trademark late surge to rally from last and defeat a strong field that included Fierceness and White Abarrio.

He turned in another gutsy performance in the Grade I Jockey Club Gold Cup at Saratoga on August 31, 2025. After the race began with a rough start that saw rider Irad Ortiz Jr. unseated from his mount Mindframe, the field briefly scattered, and Sierra Leone had to hop over the fallen Ortiz Jr. before he found his rhythm at the back of the pack. True to form, he came flying late down the stretch, closing strongly to secure second behind Antiquarian.

Sierra Leone capped off his career with another tremendous effort in the Breeders' Cup Classic at Del Mar. Attempting to become just the second horse ever to capture 2 runnings of the prestigious race, he settled near the rear through the early stages before steadily advancing on the far turn. In deep stretch, he unleashed a determined late rally, cutting into lead with every stride but coming up just short at the wire to Forever Young.

== Stud ==
In November 2025, Coolmore Stud announced that Sierra Leone will stand for $75,000 in 2026.

== Statistics ==
Date	Distance	Race	Grade	Track	Odds	Field	Finish	Winning Time	Winning (Losing) Margin	Winner (Runner-Up)	Jockey	Ref
2023 – Two-year-old season
Nov 4, 2023	1 mile	Maiden Special Weight		Aqueduct	3.20	7	1	1:36.94	1 1/4 lengths	(Change of Command)	Manuel Franco	
Dec 2, 2023	1 1/8 miles	Remsen Stakes	II	Aqueduct	4.00	10	2	1:50.30	(nose)	Dornoch	José Ortiz	
2024 – Three-year-old season
Feb 17, 2024	1 1/8 miles	Risen Star Stakes	II	Fair Grounds	2.70*	12	1	1:52.13	1/2 length	(Track Phantom)	Tyler Gaffalione	
Apr 6, 2024	1 1/8 miles	Blue Grass Stakes	I	Keeneland	1.66*	10	1	1:50.08	1 1/2 lengths	(Just a Touch)	Tyler Gaffalione	
May 4, 2024	1 1/4 miles	Kentucky Derby	I	Churchill Downs	4.79	20	2	2:03.34	(nose)	Mystik Dan	Tyler Gaffalione	
Jun 8, 2024	1 1/4 miles	Belmont Stakes	I	Saratoga	1.70*	10	3	2:27.30	(1 1/2 lengths)	Dornoch	Flavien Prat	
Jul 27, 2024	1 1/8 miles	Jim Dandy Stakes	II	Saratoga	0.80*	6	2	1:49.15	(1 length)	Fierceness	Flavien Prat	
Aug 24, 2024	1 1/4 miles	Travers Stakes	I	Saratoga	1.75*	8	3	2:01.79	(1 3/4 lengths)	Fierceness	Flavien Prat	
Nov 2, 2024	1 1/4 miles	Breeders' Cup Classic	I	Del Mar	6.90	14	1	2:00.78	1 1/2 lengths	(Fierceness)	Flavien Prat	
2025 – Four-year-old season
Mar 22, 2025	1 1/8 miles	New Orleans Classic Stakes	II	Fair Grounds	0.30*	5	3	1:48.10	(4 1/2 lengths)	Touchuponastar	Flavien Prat	
June 28, 2025	1 1/8 miles	Stephen Foster Stakes	I	Churchill Downs	2.06	6	2	1:47.48	(1 length)	Mindframe	Flavien Prat	
Aug 2, 2025	1 1/8 miles	Whitney Stakes	I	Saratoga	1.95	9	1	1:48.92	1 length	(Highland Falls)	Flavien Prat	
Aug 31, 2025	1 1/4 miles	Jockey Club Gold Cup	I	Saratoga	1.15*	8	2	2:02.16	(1 1/2 lengths)	Antiquarian	Flavien Prat	
Nov 1, 2025	1 1/4 miles	Breeders' Cup Classic	I	Del Mar	3.90	9	2	2:00.19	(1/2 length)	Forever Young	Flavien Prat	

Notes:
An (*) asterisk after the odds means Sierra Leone was the post-time favorite.

== Pedigree ==
Pedigree of Sierra Leone, Dark Bay or Brown Colt, foaled March 31, 2021
Sire Gun Runner (2013)	Candy Ride (ARG) (1999)	Ride the Rails (1991)	Cryptoclearance (1984)
Sire Gun Runner (2013)	Candy Ride (ARG) (1999)	Ride the Rails (1991)	Herbalesian (1969)
Sire Gun Runner (2013)	Candy Ride (ARG) (1999)	Candy Girl (ARG) (1990)	Candy Stripes (1982)
Sire Gun Runner (2013)	Candy Ride (ARG) (1999)	Candy Girl (ARG) (1990)	City Girl (ARG) (1982)
Sire Gun Runner (2013)	Quiet Giant (2007)	Giant's Causeway (1997)	Storm Cat (1983)
Sire Gun Runner (2013)	Quiet Giant (2007)	Giant's Causeway (1997)	Mariah's Storm (1991)
Sire Gun Runner (2013)	Quiet Giant (2007)	Quiet Dance (1993)	Quiet American (1986)
Sire Gun Runner (2013)	Quiet Giant (2007)	Quiet Dance (1993)	Misty Dancer (1988)
Dam Heavenly Love (2015)	Malibu Moon (1997)	A. P. Indy (1989)	Seattle Slew (1974)
Dam Heavenly Love (2015)	Malibu Moon (1997)	A. P. Indy (1989)	Weekend Surprise (1980)
Dam Heavenly Love (2015)	Malibu Moon (1997)	Macoumba (1992)	Mr. Prospector (1970)
Dam Heavenly Love (2015)	Malibu Moon (1997)	Macoumba (1992)	Maximova (FR) (1980)
Dam Heavenly Love (2015)	Darling My Darling (1997)	Deputy Minister (CAN) (1979)	Vice Regent (CAN) (1967)
Dam Heavenly Love (2015)	Darling My Darling (1997)	Deputy Minister (CAN) (1979)	Mint Copy (CAN) (1970)
Dam Heavenly Love (2015)	Darling My Darling (1997)	Roamin Rachel (1990)	Mining (1984)
Dam Heavenly Love (2015)	Darling My Darling (1997)	Roamin Rachel (1990)	One Smart Lady (1984)(family 2b)

- Sierra Leone is closely related to Forever Young, who won the 2024 Tokyo Daishōten, 2025 and 2026 Saudi Cup, and 2025 Breeders' Cup Classic, through Darling My Darling. Both have raced each other in the 2024 Kentucky Derby, and the 2024 and 2025 Breeders' Cup Classic
