= Muth (horse) =

American-bred Thoroughbred racehorse

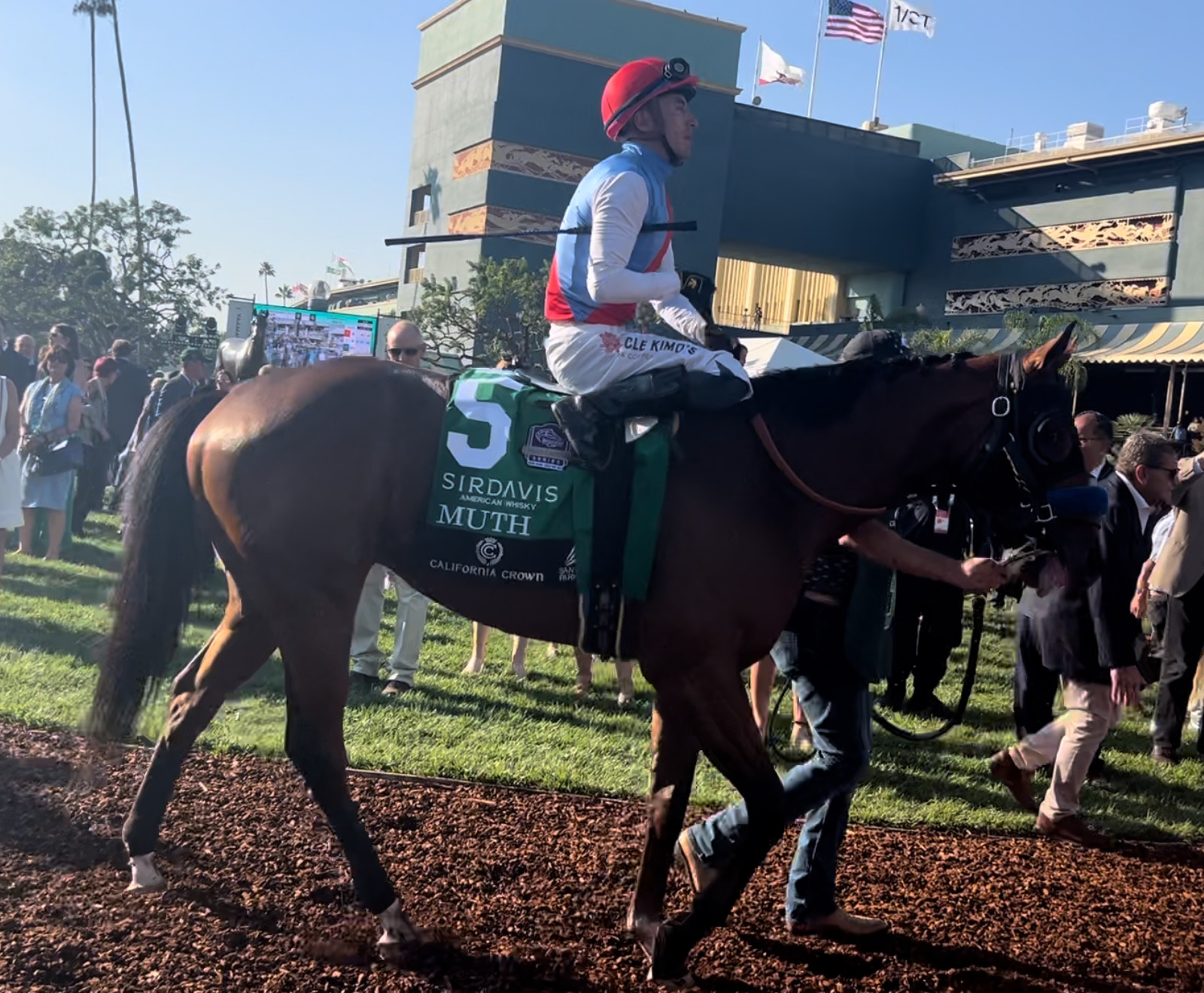
- Sire: Good Magic
- Grandsire: Curlin
- Dam: Hoppa
- Damsire: Uncle Mo
- Sex: colt
- Foaled: April 28, 2021
- Country: United States
- Color: Bay
- Breeder: Don Alberto Corporation
- Owner: Zedan Racing Stables
- Trainer: Bob Baffert
- Record: 9: 5 - 2 - 0
- Earnings: US$1,589,600

Major wins
- American Pharoah Stakes (2023); San Vicente Stakes (2024); Arkansas Derby (2024)
- Last updated on December 28, 2024

Muth (foaled April 28, 2021) is a multiple Grade I winning American Thoroughbred racehorse. In 2023, the two-year-old colt won the Grade I American Pharoah Stakes at Santa Anita Park. In 2024, he won the Grade I Arkansas Derby at Oaklawn Park.

== Background ==
Muth is a bay colt who was bred by the Don Alberto Corporation, out of the winning Uncle Mo mare Hoppa. Muth is the mare's first foal. Muth was first sold in 2022 at the Keeneland September Yearling Sale as part of the Hill 'n' Dale Sales Agency consignment for US$190,000 to the Bishop Bloodstock. The following year Muth was auctioned at the Ocala Breeders' Sales Company's 2023 March Sale of Two-Year-Olds in Training for US$2 million to Amr Zedan and his Zedan Racing Stables.

Muth was named after Aaron Muth, a long time friend and enthusiastic supporter of trainer Bob Baffert and his stable. When it came to naming the horse after owner Amr Zedan purchased him, Baffert asked if the horse could be named after his longtime supporter and Zedan agreed.

== Racing career ==
=== 2023: two-year-old season ===
Muth won his debut race in June 2023 as a two-year-old at Santa Anita Park, beating five others in the five-furlong sprint by 8 3/4 lengths. He then competed in the Best Pal Stakes at Del Mar Racetrack in August, where he finished second after being bumped at the start. Muth returned to Santa Anita in the fall to win the American Pharoah Stakes, before finishing his two-year-old season with a second-place finish in the Breeders' Cup Juvenile.

=== 2024: three-year-old season ===
Muth's first race of 2024 as a three-year-old came in the San Vicente Stakes, which he won to give his trainer Bob Baffert his 13th win in the race. Muth was then shipped to Oaklawn Park to compete in their signature race, the Arkansas Derby. Sent off as the second choice, Muth put away favored Timberlake near the far turn and maintained his lead to the finish, winning by two lengths.

Following Muth's win in Arkansas, Baffert said that the horse would race next in the Preakness Stakes, the second jewel of thoroughbred racing's Triple Crown. Muth is not eligible to compete in the 2024 Kentucky Derby after Churchill Downs extended a ban on Baffert entering horses at its tracks following the positive drug test and subsequent disqualification of 2021 Derby winner Medina Spirit. Legal challenges by Zedan to lift Churchill's ban on Baffert were dismissed by both the Jefferson County Circuit Court and the Kentucky Court of Appeals. Had Muth been eligible, he would have had enough Road to the Kentucky Derby points to compete.

Muth was drawn into the Preakness, but about 12 hours after his arrival at Pimlico it was announced by track officials that he had developed a 103-degree fever and would scratch from the race.

== Statistics ==
Date	Distance	Race	Grade	Track	Odds	Field	Finish	Winning Time	Winning (Losing) Margin	Jockey	Ref
2023 – Two-year-old season
Jun 18, 2023	5 furlongs	Maiden Special Weight		Santa Anita	0.30*	6	1	0:57.29	8 3/4 lengths	Juan J. Hernandez	
Aug 13, 2023	6 furlongs	Best Pal Stakes	III	Del Mar	0.50*	5	2	1:09.19	(4 1/4 lengths)	Juan J. Hernandez	
Oct 7, 2023	1 1/16 miles	American Pharoah Stakes	I	Santa Anita	0.40*	8	1	1:42.45	3 3/4 lengths	Juan J. Hernandez	
Nov 3, 2023	1 1/16 miles	Breeders' Cup Juvenile	I	Santa Anita	2.70	9	2	1:41.90	(6 1/4 lengths)	Juan J. Hernandez	
2024 – Three-year-old season
Jan 6, 2024	7 furlongs	San Vicente Stakes	II	Santa Anita	0.40*	6	1	1:23.01	2 3/4 lengths	Juan J. Hernandez	
Mar 30, 2024	1 1/8 miles	Arkansas Derby	I	Oaklawn Park	2.30	10	1	1:49.54	2 lengths	Juan J. Hernandez	
Sep 1, 2024	1 mile	Shared Belief Stakes	Listed	Del Mar	0.20*	7	1	1:35.64	2 lengths	Juan J. Hernandez	
Sep 28, 2024	1 1/8 miles	California Crown Stakes	I	Santa Anita	1.50*	6	6	1:48.68	(15 3/4 lengths)	Juan J. Hernandez	
Nov 2, 2024	1 mile	Breeders' Cup Dirt Mile	I	Del Mar	4.60	13	7	1:35.48	(6 1/4 lengths)	Juan J. Hernandez	

Notes:
An (*) asterisk after the odds means Muth was the post-time favorite.

== Pedigree ==
Pedigree of Muth (USA), bay colt, April 28, 2021
Sire Good Magic (2015)	Curlin (2004)	Smart Strike (CAN) (1992)	Mr. Prospector (1970)
Sire Good Magic (2015)	Curlin (2004)	Smart Strike (CAN) (1992)	Classy 'n Smart (CAN) (1981)
Sire Good Magic (2015)	Curlin (2004)	Sheriff's Deputy (1994)	Deputy Minister (CAN) (1979)
Sire Good Magic (2015)	Curlin (2004)	Sheriff's Deputy (1994)	Barbarika (1985)
Sire Good Magic (2015)	Glinda the Good (2009)	Hard Spun (2004)	Danzig (1977)
Sire Good Magic (2015)	Glinda the Good (2009)	Hard Spun (2004)	Turkish Tryst (1991)
Sire Good Magic (2015)	Glinda the Good (2009)	Magical Flash (1990)	Miswaki (1978)
Sire Good Magic (2015)	Glinda the Good (2009)	Magical Flash (1990)	Gil's Magic (1983)
Dam Hoppa (2016)	Uncle Mo (2008)	Indian Charlie (1995)	In Excess (IRE) (1987)
Dam Hoppa (2016)	Uncle Mo (2008)	Indian Charlie (1995)	Soviet Sojourn (1989)
Dam Hoppa (2016)	Uncle Mo (2008)	Playa Maya (2000)	Arch (1995)
Dam Hoppa (2016)	Uncle Mo (2008)	Playa Maya (2000)	Dixie Slippers (1995)
Dam Hoppa (2016)	Handoverthecat (2010)	Tale of the Cat (1994)	Storm Cat (1983)
Dam Hoppa (2016)	Handoverthecat (2010)	Tale of the Cat (1994)	Yarn (1987)
Dam Hoppa (2016)	Handoverthecat (2010)	Frayne (1999)	Red Ransom (1987)
Dam Hoppa (2016)	Handoverthecat (2010)	Frayne (1999)	Beautiful Bedouin (1984)
