= 2024 Kentucky Derby =

Horse race

150th Kentucky Derby
- Kentucky Derby
- Grade I stakes race
- Location: Churchill Downs; Louisville, Kentucky, United States
- Date: May 4, 2024
- Distance: 1 1/4 mi (10 furlongs; 2,012 m)
- Winning horse: Mystik Dan
- Winning time: 2:03.34
- Final odds: 18:1
- Jockey: Brian Hernandez Jr.
- Trainer: Kenneth G. McPeek
- Owner: Lance Gasaway, Daniel Hamby, 4G Racing
- Conditions: Fast
- Surface: Dirt
- Attendance: 156,710

The 2024 Kentucky Derby (branded as the 150th Running of the Kentucky Derby presented by Woodford Reserve for sponsorship reasons) was the 150th running of the Kentucky Derby. It took place on May 4, 2024, at Churchill Downs in Louisville, Kentucky. The race was open to 20 horses, who qualified through the 2024 Road to the Kentucky Derby.

Mystik Dan won in a three-way photo finish, at 18:1 odds. He and jockey Brian Hernandez Jr. held off late charges by Sierra Leone and Forever Young to reach the wire first by a nose. It was the first nose margin victory since the 1996 Kentucky Derby won by Grindstone and the first three-horse photo finish since the 1947 Kentucky Derby, which was won by Jet Pilot. One day before the Kentucky Derby, Hernandez and trainer Kenny McPeek teamed up with Thorpedo Anna to win the Kentucky Oaks. McPeek became the first trainer since 1952 to win the Kentucky Oaks and the Kentucky Derby in the same year.

The race was broadcast by NBC. Coverage of undercard events began at noon EDT on USA Network before transitioning to the main NBC network for pre-race activities at 2:30 p.m. The entirety of the day was also streamed on NBC's streaming platform Peacock. FanDuel TV also provided live streaming from 10:30 a.m. to noon and from 7:30 p.m. until the festivities ended.

A record $210.7 million was bet on the 2024 Kentucky Derby. Overall, a record $320.5 million was bet on the races that were run at Churchill Downs on the day of the Kentucky Derby. NBC reported an average of 16.7 million viewers across its platforms and a peak audience of 20.1 million viewers, making it the most watched running of the race since 1989. Prior to the race, NBC and Churchill Downs announced an extension of NBC's broadcasting rights to last through 2032.

== Qualification ==
The field was limited to twenty horses who qualify based on points earned in the 2024 Road to the Kentucky Derby, a series of designated races that was first introduced in 2013. This point system replaced the previous graded stakes race earnings system. The Main Road consists mostly of races in North America and one in Dubai, the Japan Road consists of four races in Japan, and the European Road consists of seven races in Great Britain, Ireland and France. T O Password qualified via the Japan Road to the Kentucky Derby. Horses trained by Hall of Famer Bob Baffert, who is suspended from entering and racing horses at tracks owned by Churchill Downs, did not earn any qualification points.

== Entries ==
The field was drawn on April 27. Fierceness was installed as the 5-to-2 favorite and drew post number 17.

On April 30, Encino was scratched from the entry list after suffering a soft tissue strain, which allowed the John Ennis-trained Epic Ride to qualify from the also-eligible list.

== Results ==
The race was won by Mystik Dan, trained by Ken McPeek, winning a three-way photo finish over Sierra Leone and Japanese contender Forever Young. Mystik Dan came into the race with two wins in six starts, with his most recent victory coming in the Southwest Stakes at Oaklawn Park. Pre-race favorite Fierceness was among the early front runners of the race with Just Steel and Track Phantom, but Fierceness was unable to keep pace in the home stretch and dropped to a 15th-place finish. Track Phantom finished 11th and Just Steel finished 17th. Mystik Dan was brought to the rail by jockey Brian Hernandez Jr. soon after the start and sat mid-pack behind a modest pace before making his bid for the lead around the far turn when he slipped past Track Phantom. He held a short lead turning for home and drew clear by two lengths down the stretch. Sierra Leone and Forever Young closed late, but were not able to catch Mystik Dan, who held on to win the race by a nose in the race's first three-horse photo finish since the 1947 Kentucky Derby. Sierra Leone and Forever Young repeatedly bumped each other down the stretch, but neither horse's jockey claimed a foul. The Kentucky Horse Racing Commission announced that the stewards ordered, Sierra Leone's rider,Tyler Gaffalione's presence at the race's "film review" on May 9. In the final straightaway duel, Gaffalione made multiple contacts with Forever Young with his left hand. Chad Brown, Sierra Leone's trainer, however, defended his jockey. Gaffalione was given a $2,500 fine for the incident.

Finish	Program Numbers	Horse	Qualifying Points	Trainer	Jockey	Morning Line Odds	Final Odds	Margin (Lengths)	Winnings
1	3	Mystik Dan	46	Kenneth G. McPeek	Brian Hernandez Jr.	20:1	18.61		$3,100,000
2	2	Sierra Leone	155	Chad C. Brown	Tyler Gaffalione	3:1	4.79	Nose	$1,000,000
3	11	Forever Young (JPN)	100	Yoshito Yahagi	Ryusei Sakai	10:1	7.03	Head	$500,000
4	4	Catching Freedom	125	Brad H. Cox	Flavien Prat	8:1	8.47	1 3/4	$250,000
5	10	T O Password (JPN)	40	Daisuke Takayanagi	Kazushi Kimura	30:1	48.20	6 1/2	$150,000
6	19	Resilience	110	William I. Mott	Junior Alvarado	20:1	31.85	7 3/4	
7	18	Stronghold	125	Philip D'Amato	Antonio Fresu	20:1	35.55	12 3/4	
8	7	Honor Marie	65	Whitworth D. Beckman	Ben Curtis	20:1	14.90	13 1/2	
9	14	Endlessly	100	Michael McCarthy	Umberto Rispoli	30:1	48.83	13 3/4	
10	1	Dornoch	75	Danny Gargan	Luis Saez	20:1	22.91	18	
11	12	Track Phantom	70	Steven M. Asmussen	Joel Rosario	20:1	41.58	18 1/2	
12	13	West Saratoga	67	Larry Demeritte	Jesús Castañón	50:1	22.93	22 1/2	
13	15	Domestic Product	60	Chad C. Brown	Irad Ortiz Jr.	30:1	24.17	22 3/4	
14	21	Epic Ride	35	John Ennis	Adam Beschizza	50:1	47.57	23 3/4	
15	17	Fierceness	136	Todd A. Pletcher	John R. Velazquez	5:2	3.21	24 1/2	
16	20	Society Man	50	Danny Gargan	Frankie Dettori	50:1	47.41	32 1/2	
17	6	Just Steel	65	D. Wayne Lukas	Keith Asmussen	20:1	21.27	33 3/4	
18	16	Grand Mo the First	40	Victor Barboza Jr.	Emisael Jaramillo	50:1	49.32	37	
19	5	Catalytic	50	Saffie Joseph Jr.	José Ortiz	30:1	34.82	40 3/4	
20	8	Just a Touch	75	Brad H. Cox	Florent Geroux	10:1	11.57	54	
scratched	~~9~~	Encino	40	Brad H. Cox	Axel Concepcion	20:1			
	~~AE~~ (Note: Mugatu was second on the also-eligible list. He did not draw in to the field as there was only one scratch from the original field of 20 before race day.)	Mugatu	14	Jeff Engler	Joseph Talamo	50:1			

Track condition: fast

Times: 1/4 mile – 22.97; 1/2 mile – 46.63; 3/4 mile – 1:11.31; mile – 1:37.46; final – 2:03.34.
Splits for each quarter-mile: (22.97) (23.66) (24.68) (26.15) (25.88)

Source: Equibase chart

=== Payouts ===
The table below provides the Kentucky Derby payout schedule for a $2 stake.

Program number	Horse name	Win	Place	Show
3	Mystik Dan	$39.22	$16.32	$10.00
2	Sierra Leone	—	$6.54	$4.64
11	Forever Young	—	—	$5.58

- $2 Exacta (3–2): $258.56
- $0.50 Trifecta (3–2–11): $556.92
- $1 Superfecta (3–2–11–4): $8,254.07
- $1 Super High Five (3–2–11–4–10): $316,920.10

Preceded by 2023 Belmont Stakes	Triple Crown	Succeeded by 2024 Preakness Stakes
