= Sunland Park Derby =

- Class: Listed
- Location: Sunland Park Racetrack; Sunland Park, New Mexico, United States
- Inaugurated: 2003 (as WinStar Derby)
- Race type: Thoroughbred - Flat racing
- Website: Sunland Park Derby

Race information
- Distance: 1 1/16 miles
- Surface: Dirt
- Track: left-handed
- Qualification: Three-year-olds
- Weight: Fillies: 117 lbs. Colts & Geldings: 122 lbs
- Purse: $500,000 (2026)
- Bonuses: Qualification points – Road to the Kentucky Derby

The Sunland Park Derby is a Listed American Thoroughbred horse race for three-year-olds over a distance of 1 1/16 miles on the dirt scheduled annually in February at Sunland Park Racetrack in Sunland Park, New Mexico. The event currently offers a purse of $500,000.

== History ==
The event was inaugurated on March 30, 2003, as the WinStar Derby after sponsorship by WinStar Farm of Versailles, Kentucky. The purse allotted was $500,000 which was a major attraction to the track. Previously, Sunland Park has hosted an event known as the Riley Allison Derby. However, the purse offered for the event was a fraction of what the new event. Later the Riley Allison Derby was moved to January. Today it is known as the Riley Allison Stakes and it is a preparation event for the Sunland Park Derby.

In 2005 the distance of the event was increased to 1 1/8 miles. In 2009 the event was renamed as the Sunland Derby and the purse was increased to $900,000. The fourth-place finisher in that event, Mine That Bird followed that effort with a stunning victory in the Kentucky Derby.

For the event's 11th running in 2010, it received Grade III status from the American Graded Stakes Committee for the first time. Since 2013 the event is an official Road to the Kentucky Derby prep race with qualification points offered.

The 2016 running of the Sunland Derby was cancelled due to an outbreak of Equine herpesvirus 1.

In 2019 the event was run as the Sunland Park Derby.

The 2020 and 2021 running of the Sunland Park Derby was cancelled due to an outbreak of COVID-19. The purse for the event was decrease substantially in 2022 to $500,000 when the event was resumed.

In 2024 the distance was decreased to 1 1/16 miles and the event was moved in the racing calendar to mid-February.

In 2025 the event was downgraded by the Thoroughbred Owners and Breeders Association to Listed status.

== Records ==
Speed record:

- 1 1/16 miles: 1:42.64 – Stronghold (2024) & Getaway Car (2025)
- 1 1/8 miles: 1:46.94 – Cutting Humor (2019)

Margins

- 14 1/2 lengths – Firing Line (2015)

Most wins by a jockey:

- 2 - Victor Espinoza (2006, 2007)
- 2 - Martin Garcia (2013, 2014)

Most wins by a trainer:

- 4 - Bob Baffert (2006, 2013, 2014, 2025)
- 4 - Doug F. O'Neill (2003, 2005, 2022, 2026)

Most wins by an owner:

- 2 - Michael E. Pegram (2006, 2013)
- 2 - Reddam Racing (2022, 2026)

== Winners ==
Year	Winner	Jockey	Trainer	Owner	Distance	Time	Purse	Grade	Ref
Sunland Park Derby
2026	Pavlovian	Edwin Maldonado	Doug F. O'Neill	Reddam Racing	1 1/16 miles	1:42.22	$500,000	Listed	
2025	Getaway Car	Juan J. Hernandez	Bob Baffert	SF Racing, Starlight Racing, Madaket Stables, Robert E. Masterson, Stonestreet Stables, Dianne Bashor, Determined Stables, Tom J. Ryan, Waves Edge Capital & Catherine Donovan	1 1/16 miles	1:42.64	$400,000	Listed	
2024	Stronghold	Antonio Fresu	Philip D’Amato	Eric M. Waller & Sharon Waller	1 1/16 miles	1:42.64	$400,000	III	
2023	Wild On Ice	Ken S. Tohill	Joel H. Marr	Frank Sumpter Jr.	1 1/8 miles	1:51.39	$600,000	III	
2022	Slow Down Andy	Mario Gutierrez	Doug F. O'Neill	Reddam Racing	1 1/8 miles	1:50.16	$500,000	III	
2021	Not run due to the COVID-19 pandemic								
2020	Not run due to the COVID-19 pandemic								
2019	Cutting Humor	John R. Velazquez	Todd A. Pletcher	Starlight Racing	1 1/8 miles	1:50.16	$800,000	III	
Sunland Derby
2018	Runaway Ghost	Tracy J. Hebert	Todd W. Fincher	Joe Peacock	1 1/8 miles	1:49.20	$800,000	III	
2017	Hence	Alfredo J. Juarez Jr.	Steven M. Asmussen	Calumet Farm	1 1/8 miles	1:48.10	$800,000	III	
2016	Not run due to an outbreak of Equine herpesvirus								
2015	Firing Line	Gary L. Stevens	Simon Callaghan	Arnold Zetcher	1 1/8 miles	1:47.39	$800,000	III	
2014	Chitu	Martin Garcia	Bob Baffert	Tanma Corporation	1 1/8 miles	1:47.88	$800,110	III	
2013	Govenor Charlie	Martin Garcia	Bob Baffert	Michael E. Pegram	1 1/8 miles	1:47.54	$800,000	III	
2012	Daddy Nose Best	Julien Leparoux	Steven M. Asmussen	Cathy & Robert Zollars	1 1/8 miles	1:48.59	$800,000	III	
2011	Twice the Appeal	Christian S. Reyes	Jeffrey L. Bonde	Edward J. Brown Jr., Victor Flores & Henry Hernandez	1 1/8 miles	1:50.91	$800,000	III	
2010	Endorsement	Robby Albarado	Shannon Ritter	WinStar Farm	1 1/8 miles	1:48.46	$800,000	III	
2009	Kelly Leak	Mike E. Smith	Mike Machowsky	Blahut Racing, Dennis Avila & Dave Johnson	1 1/8 miles	1:50.02	$900,000	Listed	
WinStar Derby
2008	Liberty Bull	Gerard Melancon	Thomas M. Amoss	Kenneth Maier	1 1/8 miles	1:49.82	$600,000	Listed	
2007	Song of Navarone	Victor Espinoza	Henry Dominguez	George E. Coleman	1 1/8 miles	1:49.53	$600,000	Listed	
2006	Wanna Runner	Victor Espinoza	Bob Baffert	Michael E. Pegram	1 1/8 miles	1:48.88	$600,000	Listed	
2005	Thor's Echo	Corey Nakatani	Doug F. O'Neill	Suarez Racing Stable	1 1/8 miles	1:49.59	$500,000	Listed	
2004	Hi Teck Man	Ricardo Jaime	Johnnie Nall	Hassel R. & Bonnie V. Spraberry	1 1/16 miles	1:43.20	$500,000	Listed	
2003	Excessivepleasure	Pat Day	Doug F. O'Neill	Lee & Ty Leatherman	1 1/16 miles	1:42.84	$500,000	Listed	

== See also ==
- List of American and Canadian Graded races
