= Stronghold (horse) =

American racehorse

- Sire: Ghostzapper
- Grandsire: Awesome Again
- Dam: Spectator
- Damsire: Jimmy Creed
- Sex: colt
- Foaled: January 24, 2021
- Country: United States
- Colour: Bay
- Breeder: Eric & Sharon Waller
- Owner: Eric & Sharon Waller
- Trainer: Philip D'Amato
- Record: 8: 3 – 4 – 0
- Earnings: $886,000

Major wins
- Sunland Park Derby (2024); Santa Anita Derby (2024)
- Last updated on July 7, 2024

Stronghold (foaled January 24, 2021) is a multiple-Grade winning American Thoroughbred racehorse. In 2024, as a three-year-old colt, he won the Grade 1 Santa Anita Derby at Santa Anita Park.

== Background ==
Stronghold is a bay colt who was bred in Kentucky by Eric and Sharon Waller. They also own the horse. The Waller family have been involved with lineage from the fourth dam One Stop. The third dam, Swiss Diva, died while giving birth to the second dam, Diva's Tribute. Also Stronghold's dam, Spectator, died in 2021 while giving birth to him. Spectator went on to win the Sorrento Stakes and finished second in the Grade 2 Santa Anita Oaks to Midnight Bisou.
Stronghold's sire is Ghostzapper, the 2004 Horse of the Year and a member of the National Museum of Racing and Hall of Fame. In October 2020, Ghostzapper was relocated to Hill 'n' Dale Farms in Kentucky where he stands for $75,000 (2024).

Stronghold is trained by Philip D'Amato.

== Career ==
=== 2023: two-year-old season ===
Stronghold made his debut on August 27, in a maiden special weight event over 6 furlongs at Ellis Park. From post six in a field of eight, he broke well and prompted the speed three wide. He battled with the eventual winner Awesome Road through the midstretch but with about 100 yards to run was turned away to finish 2 3/4 lengths in second place but 10 lengths ahead of the third-place finished.

In his next start on at Churchill Downs on October 1, in maiden special weight event over one mile Stronghold started as the 11/20 odds-on favorite and defeated Resilience and Track Phantom. The quality of the field was commendable as all three place-getters would win Graded stakes and all three would qualify for the Kentucky Derby the following year.

At his first attempt in graded company Stronghold face three other horses in the Grade 3 Bob Hope Stakes at Del Mar Racetrack. Chosen as the 9/2 second favorite Stronghold was soundly defeated by the odds-on favorite Nysos by nearly nine lengths in a time of 1:21.71 for the 7 furlongs.

In his last of the year Stronghold faced four other juveniles in the Grade II Los Alamitos Futurity at Los Alamitos Race Course. Starting as the 4-1 third choice in the field Stronghold jumped out of the gate unhurried. At field approached the second turn Stronghold challenged from the rail and as they entered into the stretch, the race came down to longshot Wynstock and Stronghold. Stronghold got the advantage, but Wynstock wrested the lead back bumping each other before Wynstock pulled away to win by a half-length in 1:43.53. The stewards posted the inquiry sign following the race because of the contact. However, they ruled that there would be no change, determining that both horses contributed to the incident.

=== 2024: three-year-old season ===
Stronghold started his three-year-old campaign away from his base in California traveling to New Mexico and running in the Grade III Sunland Park Derby at Sunland Park on February 18. Stronghold dueled with local hero Lucky Jeremy through a first quarter in :23.69 and a half-mile in :47.45. Putting a head in front at the three-quarter marker, Stronghold then showed his dominance, pushing clear in the stretch despite a valiant effort from Lucky Jeremy for a 2 1/2 lengths victory in a time of 1:42.64 setting a new stakes record for the 1 1/16 miles.

In his next start on April 6, Stronghold returned to California and started as the 11/5 second favorite in the Grade 1 Santa Anita Derby at Santa Anita Park. Facing the Bob Baffert-trained even-money favorite Imagination, jockey Antonio Fresu had Stronghold in fourth behind a first quarter-mile in :22.72 and a half-mile in :46.73. Stronghold didn't get a completely trouble-free trip, lacking room at the quarter pole before splitting rivals at the top of the stretch. From there he took on Imagination for a stretch battle that could have gone either way. Neither colt gave in, and at the wire, Stronghold bravely stuck his neck out in front, in a time of 1:49.98. Antonio Fresu won his first Grade I in the US and Stronghold earned 100 qualification points in the Road to the Kentucky Derby and easily qualified for the first leg of the Triple Crown.

== Statistics ==
Date	Distance	Race	Grade	Track	Odds	Field	Finish	Winning Time	Winning (Losing) Margin	Jockey	Ref
2023 – Two-year-old season
Aug 27, 2023	6 furlongs	Maiden Special Weight		Ellis Park	5.35	8	2	1:10.80	(2 3/4 lengths)	Joseph Talamo	
Oct 1, 2023	1 mile	Maiden Special Weight		Churchill Downs	0.55*	9	1	1:35.99	1 1/2 lengths	Joseph Talamo	
Nov 19, 2023	7 furlongs	Bob Hope Stakes	III	Del Mar	4.50	4	2	1:21.71	(8 3/4 lengths)	Antonio Fresu	
Dec 16, 2023	1 1/16 miles	Los Alamitos Futurity	II	Los Alamitos	4.10	5	2	1:43.53	(1/2 length)	Antonio Fresu	
2024 – Three-year-old season
Feb 18, 2024	1 1/16 miles	Sunland Park Derby	III	Sunland Park	1.20*	8	1	1:42.64 (Note: Stronghold set a new stakes record time for the 1 1/16-mile distance of the Sunland Park Derby)	2 1/2 lengths	Antonio Fresu	
Apr 6, 2024	1 1/8 miles	Santa Anita Derby	I	Santa Anita	2.20	8	1	1:49.98	neck	Antonio Fresu	
May 4, 2024	1 1/4 miles	Kentucky Derby	I	Churchill Downs	35.55	20	7	2:03.34	(12 3/4 lengths)	Antonio Fresu	
Jul 6, 2024	1 1/16 miles	Indiana Derby	III	Indianapolis	1.20*	7	2	1:42.26	(2 1/2 lengths)	Antonio Fresu	

Notes:
An (*) asterisk after the odds means Stronghold was the post-time favorite.

== Pedigree ==
Pedigree of Stronghold, bay Colt, January 24, 2021
Sire Ghostzapper (2000)	Awesome Again (1994)	Deputy Minister (CAN) (1979)	Vice Regent (CAN) (1967)
Sire Ghostzapper (2000)	Awesome Again (1994)	Deputy Minister (CAN) (1979)	Mint Copy (CAN) (1970)
Sire Ghostzapper (2000)	Awesome Again (1994)	Primal Force (1987)	Blushing Groom (FR) (1974)
Sire Ghostzapper (2000)	Awesome Again (1994)	Primal Force (1987)	Prime Prospect (1978)
Sire Ghostzapper (2000)	Baby Zip (1990)	Relaunch (1976)	In Reality (1964)
Sire Ghostzapper (2000)	Baby Zip (1990)	Relaunch (1976)	Foggy Note (1965)
Sire Ghostzapper (2000)	Baby Zip (1990)	Thirty Zip (1983)	Tri Jet (1969)
Sire Ghostzapper (2000)	Baby Zip (1990)	Thirty Zip (1983)	Saliaway (1976)
Dam Spectator (2015)	Jimmy Creed (2009)	Distorted Humor (1993)	Forty Niner (1985)
Dam Spectator (2015)	Jimmy Creed (2009)	Distorted Humor (1993)	Danzig's Beauty (1987)
Dam Spectator (2015)	Jimmy Creed (2009)	Hookedonthefeelin (1996)	Citidancer (1987)
Dam Spectator (2015)	Jimmy Creed (2009)	Hookedonthefeelin (1996)	Prospective Joy (1991)
Dam Spectator (2015)	Diva's Tribute (2010)	Henny Hughes (2003)	Hennessy (1993)
Dam Spectator (2015)	Diva's Tribute (2010)	Henny Hughes (2003)	Meadow Flyer (1989)
Dam Spectator (2015)	Diva's Tribute (2010)	Swiss Diva (2004)	Swiss Yodeler (1994)
Dam Spectator (2015)	Diva's Tribute (2010)	Swiss Diva (2004)	One Stop (1993) (family 9f)
