= Mystik Dan =

American race horse, winner of the 150th Kentucky Derby

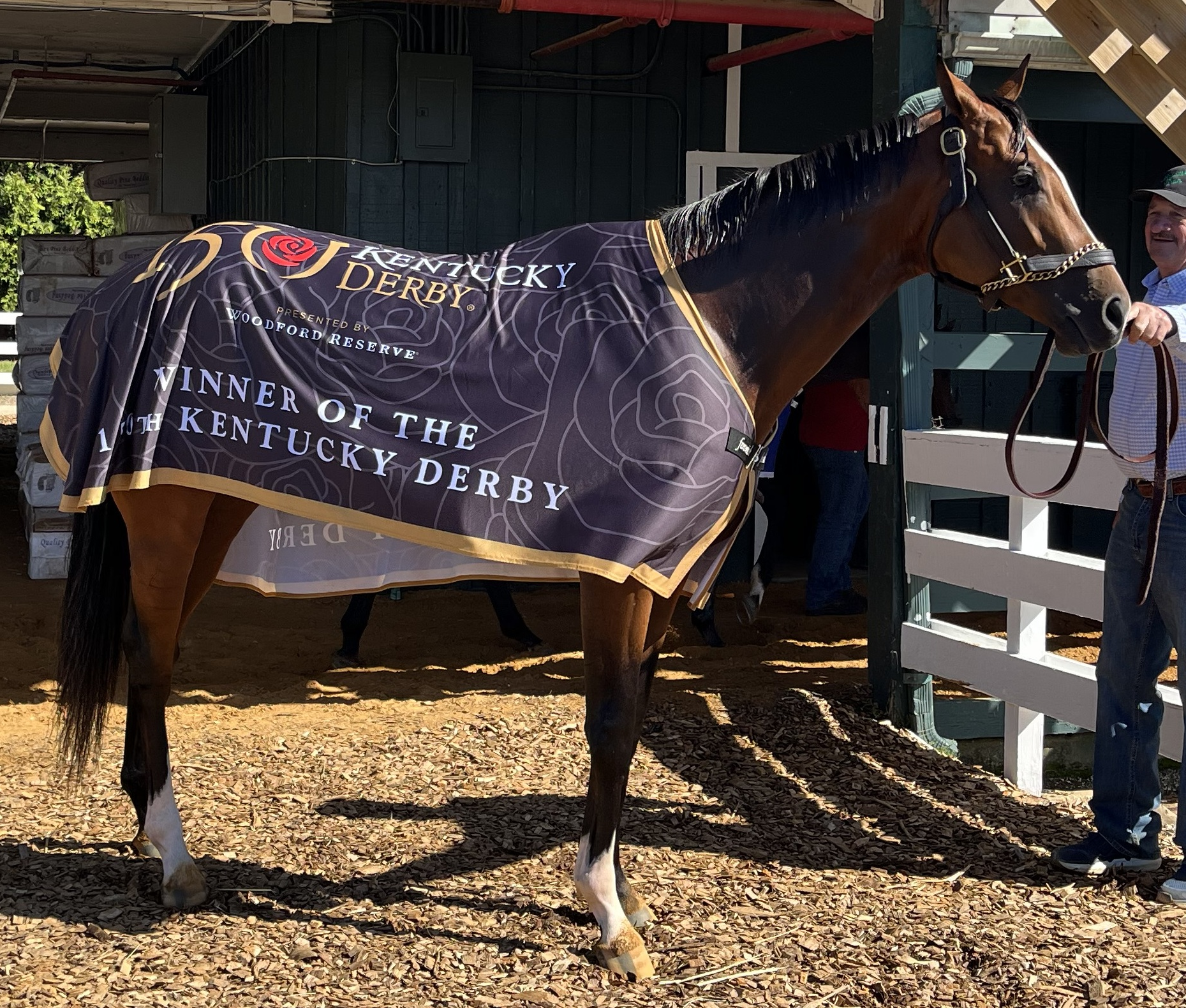
- Mystik Dan in 2024
- Sire: Goldencents
- Grandsire: Into Mischief
- Dam: Ma'am
- Damsire: Colonel John
- Sex: Stallion
- Foaled: March 4, 2021 (age 5); Kentucky, U.S.
- Country: United States
- Color: Bay
- Breeder: Homebred
- Owner: Lance Gasaway, Daniel Hamby, 4G Racing, and Valley View Farm
- Trainer: Kenneth McPeek
- Record: 16: 5 – 3 – 1
- Earnings: US$4,819,160

Major wins
- Southwest Stakes (2024); Blame Stakes (2025); Lukas Classic Stakes (2025); American Triple Crown wins: Kentucky Derby (2024)

Mystik Dan (foaled March 4, 2021) is an American Thoroughbred racehorse. Jockeyed by Brian Hernandez Jr., he won the 2024 Kentucky Derby by a nose, beating Sierra Leone and Forever Young with a time of 2:03.34.

== Background ==
Mystik Dan is a bay stallion bred in Kentucky by Lance Gasaway and Daniel Hamby. His name is derived by a combination of Hamby's father's first name (Dan) with his father's first business venture (Mystik Tape).

Mystik Dan's dam Ma'am was bought by trainer Kenneth McPeek for the owners and he recommended the mating of Goldencents to her. The colt was foaled at his Magdalena Farm near Lexington. Goldencents, a two-time Grade 1 Breeders' Cup Dirt Mile winner, stands for $10,000 at Spendthrift Farm in Kentucky (2024).

== Stud ==
It was announced that the conclusion of Mystik Dan's racing career he would stand at Airdrie Stud in Kentucky. His initial stud fee would be $15,000.

== Statistics ==
Date	Distance	Race	Grade	Track	Odds	Field	Finish	Winning Time	Winning (Losing) Margin	Jockey	Ref
2023 – Two-year-old season
Oct 22, 2023	6 1/2 furlongs	Maiden Special Weight		Keeneland	12.83	11	2	1:18.24	(1 1/4 lengths)	Brian Hernandez Jr.	
Nov 12, 2023	5 1/2 furlongs	Maiden Special Weight		Churchill Downs	0.82*	10	1	1:35.68	7 3/4 lengths	Brian Hernandez Jr.	
Nov 25, 2023	1 mile	Allowance		Churchill Downs	2.14*	11	5	1:37.94	(8 lengths)	Brian Hernandez Jr.	
2024 – Three-year-old season
Jan 1, 2024	1 1/16 miles	Smarty Jones Stakes	Listed	Oaklawn Park	7.90	9	5	1:44.59	(3 1/4 lengths)	Julien Leparoux	
Feb 3, 2024	1 1/16 miles	Southwest Stakes	III	Oaklawn Park	11.40	11	1	1:43.67	8 lengths	Brian Hernandez Jr.	
Mar 30, 2024	1 1/8 miles	Arkansas Derby	I	Oaklawn Park	4.00	10	3	1:49.54	(6 1/4 lengths)	Brian Hernandez Jr.	
May 4, 2024	1 1/4 miles	Kentucky Derby	I	Churchill Downs	18.61	20	1	2:03.34	nose	Brian Hernandez Jr.	
May 18, 2024	1 3/16 miles	Preakness Stakes	I	Pimlico	2.40*	8	2	1:56.82	(2 1/4 lengths)	Brian Hernandez Jr.	
Jun 8, 2024	1 1/4 miles	Belmont Stakes	I	Saratoga	6.40	10	8	2:01.64	(15 4/4 lengths)	Brian Hernandez Jr.	
Dec 26, 2024	7 furlongs	Malibu Stakes	I	Santa Anita	3.10	6	6	1:21.54	(11 1/4 lengths)	Brian Hernandez Jr.	
2025 – Four-year-old season
Jan 25, 2025	1 1/8 miles	Pegasus World Cup	I	Gulfstream Park	12.30	11	9	1:48.05	(20 3/4 lengths)	Brian Hernandez Jr.	
May 3, 2025	1 1/16 miles	Lake Ouachita Stakes		Oaklawn Park	1.60	6	2	1:42.25	(nose)	Francisco Arrieta	
May 31, 2025	1 1/8 miles	Blame Stakes	III	Churchill Downs	3.06	7	1	1:48.45	1 1/4 lengths	Brian Hernandez Jr.	
Jun 28, 2025	1 1/8 miles	Stephen Foster Stakes	I	Churchill Downs	5.30	6	4	1:47.48	(2 1/2 lengths)	Brian Hernandez Jr.	
Aug 9, 2025	1 1/4 miles	Arlington Million	I	Colonial Downs	3.70	7	4	1:59.58	(3 1/2 lengths)	Brian Hernandez Jr.	
Sep 27, 2025	1 1/8 miles	Lukas Classic Stakes	II	Churchill Downs	1.57*	7	1	1:49.25	3/4 length	Francisco Arrieta	

Notes:
An (*) asterisk after the odds means Mystik Dan was the post-time favorite.

== Pedigree ==
Pedigree of Mystik Dan, Bay, foaled March 4, 2021
Sire Goldencents (2010)	Into Mischief (2005)	Harlan's Holiday (1999)	Harlan (1989)
Sire Goldencents (2010)	Into Mischief (2005)	Harlan's Holiday (1999)	Christmas in Aiken (1992)
Sire Goldencents (2010)	Into Mischief (2005)	Leslie's Lady (1996)	Tricky Creek (1986)
Sire Goldencents (2010)	Into Mischief (2005)	Leslie's Lady (1996)	Crystal Lady (1990)
Sire Goldencents (2010)	Golden Works (2000)	Banker's Gold (1994)	Forty Niner (1985)
Sire Goldencents (2010)	Golden Works (2000)	Banker's Gold (1994)	Banker's Lady (1985)
Sire Goldencents (2010)	Golden Works (2000)	Body Works (CAN) (1989)	Bold Ruckus (1976)
Sire Goldencents (2010)	Golden Works (2000)	Body Works (CAN) (1989)	Kinto (1980)
Dam Ma'am (2013)	Colonel John (2005)	Tiznow (1997)	Cee's Tizzy (1987)
Dam Ma'am (2013)	Colonel John (2005)	Tiznow (1997)	Cee's Song (1986)
Dam Ma'am (2013)	Colonel John (2005)	Sweet Damsel (1995)	Turkoman (1982)
Dam Ma'am (2013)	Colonel John (2005)	Sweet Damsel (1995)	Grande Dame (1986)
Dam Ma'am (2013)	Lady Siphonica (2002)	Siphon (BRZ) (1991)	Itajara (BRZ) (1983)
Dam Ma'am (2013)	Lady Siphonica (2002)	Siphon (BRZ) (1991)	Ebrea (1979)
Dam Ma'am (2013)	Lady Siphonica (2002)	Cherokee Crossing (1991)	Cherokee Colony (1985)
Dam Ma'am (2013)	Lady Siphonica (2002)	Cherokee Crossing (1991)	Sky Meadows (1986)
