= Timberlake (horse) =

American-bred Thoroughbred racehorse

- Sire: Into Mischief
- Grandsire: Harlan's Holiday
- Dam: Pin Up (IRE)
- Damsire: Lookin At Lucky
- Sex: colt
- Foaled: April 03, 2021
- Country: United States
- Color: Bay
- Breeder: St. Elias Stables
- Owner: 1. WinStar Farm & Siena Farms (2022 – Dec. 2023); 1. WinStar Farm (Feb. 2024– )
- Trainer: Brad H. Cox
- Record: 9: 3 - 1 - 1
- Earnings: $1,303,100

Major wins
- Champagne Stakes (2023); Rebel Stakes (2024)
- Last updated on 28 August 2024

Timberlake (foaled April 3, 2021) is a multiple-Grade winning American Thoroughbred racehorse. In 2023, as a two-year-old colt, he won the Grade 1 Champagne Stakes at Aqueduct Racetrack.

== Background ==
Timberlake is a bay colt who was bred in Kentucky by Vincent Viola's St. Elias Stable. Timberlake was bought for $350,000 from the Gainesway consignment at the 2022 Keeneland September Yearling Sale to the WinStar Farm & Siena Farms partnership. He is the fourth of six foals from the Irish-bred Pin Up and her first graded stakes winner.

Anthony Manganaro, the founder of Siena Farm, who died in the summer of 2023, and his son Todd sold the farm's interest in the horse to WinStar Farm after the Breeders' Cup Juvenile.

Timberlake is trained by Brad H. Cox.

== Career ==
=== 2023: two-year-old season ===
Timberlake made his debut on June 5 in a maiden special weight event over 5 1/2 furlongs at Ellis Park. From post ten in a field of ten, he broke poorly and was spent after being four-wide to finish sixth as the even-money favorite. On his next start Ellis Park over seven furlongs Timberlake made amends, leading all the way to win by over nine lengths over West Saratoga in 1:23.38.

In the Grade 1 Hopeful Stakes at Saratoga Race Course, Timberlake started at 11/5 odds and hit the front in the stretch run but was beaten by the longshot Nutella Fella by a length-and-a-half in a time of 1:24.41. Jockey Florent Geroux said after the event, "I tried to keep him settled as much as I could. Not an easy job with a big horse like this, being right between horses, but I tried my best to keep him settled. He's not a good gate horse, he's too big. He's always been a little bit sluggish, so it's hard to establish good position with the horse that's not going to break that sharp."

His connections entered Timberlake in the Grade I Champagne Stakes at Aqueduct Racetrack. On October 7 in a field of eight, Timberlake started at odds of 5/1 as the choice in the field. After the start jockey Florent Geroux had moved Timberlake up to third in the field of eight 2-year-olds, then swung about seven paths wide to launch a bid for the lead. Timberlake grabbed the lead before the eighth pole and pulled away in the final sixteenth winning by 4 1/4 lengths in 1:35.90 on a sloppy track.

In a field of nine starters for the Breeders' Cup Juvenile, Timberlake was the second choice at 16/5. Timberlake was rank to place in traffic into the first turn, settled into stride three deep, ranged up to make a mild bid midway through the second turn, but flattened during the drive with the winner Fierceness setting a fast time of 1:41.90. Timberlake finished fourth, eight lengths behind the winner.

=== 2024: three-year-old season ===
On February 24, 2024, Timberlake began his three-year-old in the Grade II Rebel Stakes at Oaklawn Park. Starting as the 4/5 odds-on favorite Timberlake was in the second flight early after the start. He was between horses, three wide into the far turn, asked along by jockey Cristian Torres midway on that bend, four wide bid into the lane, put a head in front soon after. In the stretch run he drifted out a bit, kept to pressure to edge away from Common Defense in the late going. After the race, Elliott Walden, CEO, president, and racing manager of WinStar Farm paid tribute to the late Anthony Manganaro, the founder of Siena Farm and his former co-owner who died last summer.

== Statistics ==
Date	Distance	Race	Grade	Track	Odds	Field	Finish	Winning Time	Winning (Losing) Margin	Jockey	Ref
2023 – Two-year-old season
Jun 15, 2023	5 1/2 furlongs	Maiden Special Weight		Ellis Park	1.02*	10	6	1:02.82	(14 3/4 lengths)	Florent Geroux	
Jul 21, 2023	7 furlongs	Maiden Special Weight		Ellis Park	1.25*	9	1	1:23.38	9 1/4 lengths	Florent Geroux	
Sep 4, 2023	7 furlongs	Hopeful Stakes	I	Saratoga	2.15*	10	2	1:24.41	(1 1/2 lengths)	Florent Geroux	
Oct 7, 2023	1 mile	Champagne Stakes	I	Aqueduct	4.90	8	1	1:35.90	4 1/4 lengths	Florent Geroux	
Nov 3, 2023	1 1/16 miles	Breeders' Cup Juvenile	I	Santa Anita	3.20	9	4	1:41.90	(8 lengths)	Florent Geroux	
2024 – Three-year-old season
Feb 24, 2024	1 1/16 miles	Rebel Stakes	II	Oaklawn Park	0.80*	12	1	1:44.00	2 lengths	Cristian Torres	
Mar 30, 2024	1 1/8 miles	Arkansas Derby	I	Oaklawn Park	1.10*	10	4	1:49.54	(6 3/4 lengths)	Flavien Prat	
Jul 20, 2024	1 1/8 miles	Haskell Stakes	I	Monmouth Park	3.30	7	3	1:50.31	(6 1/4 lengths)	Flavien Prat	
Aug 24, 2024	7 furlongs	H. Allen Jerkens Memorial Stakes	I	Saratoga	9.40	11	4	1:21.71	(8 1/4 lengths)	Florent Geroux	

Notes:
An (*) asterisk after the odds means Timberlake was the post-time favorite.

== Pedigree ==
Pedigree of Timberlake, bay colt, April 03, 2021
Sire Into Mischief (2005)	Harlan's Holiday (1999)	Harlan (1989)	Storm Cat (1983)
Sire Into Mischief (2005)	Harlan's Holiday (1999)	Harlan (1989)	Country Romance (1976)
Sire Into Mischief (2005)	Harlan's Holiday (1999)	Christmas in Aiken (1992)	Affirmed (1975)
Sire Into Mischief (2005)	Harlan's Holiday (1999)	Christmas in Aiken (1992)	Dowager (1980)
Sire Into Mischief (2005)	Leslie's Lady (1996)	Tricky Creek (1986)	Clever Trick (1976)
Sire Into Mischief (2005)	Leslie's Lady (1996)	Tricky Creek (1986)	Battle Creek Girl (1977)
Sire Into Mischief (2005)	Leslie's Lady (1996)	Crystal Lady (CAN) (1990)	Stop The Music (1970)
Sire Into Mischief (2005)	Leslie's Lady (1996)	Crystal Lady (CAN) (1990)	One Last Bird (1980)
Dam Pin Up (IRE) (2012)	Lookin At Lucky (2007)	Smart Strike (1992)	Mr. Prospector (1970)
Dam Pin Up (IRE) (2012)	Lookin At Lucky (2007)	Smart Strike (1992)	Classy 'n Smart (1981)
Dam Pin Up (IRE) (2012)	Lookin At Lucky (2007)	Private Feeling (1999)	Belong To Me (1989)
Dam Pin Up (IRE) (2012)	Lookin At Lucky (2007)	Private Feeling (1999)	Regal Feeling (1986)
Dam Pin Up (IRE) (2012)	Pretty City (1998)	Sadler's Wells (1981)	Northern Dancer (CAN) (1961)
Dam Pin Up (IRE) (2012)	Pretty City (1998)	Sadler's Wells (1981)	Fairy Bridge (1975)
Dam Pin Up (IRE) (2012)	Pretty City (1998)	Jude (GB) (1994)	Darshaan (GB) (1981)
Dam Pin Up (IRE) (2012)	Pretty City (1998)	Jude (GB) (1994)	Alruccaba (IRE) (1983) (family 9-c)
