= Kenneth McPeek =

American racehorse trainer

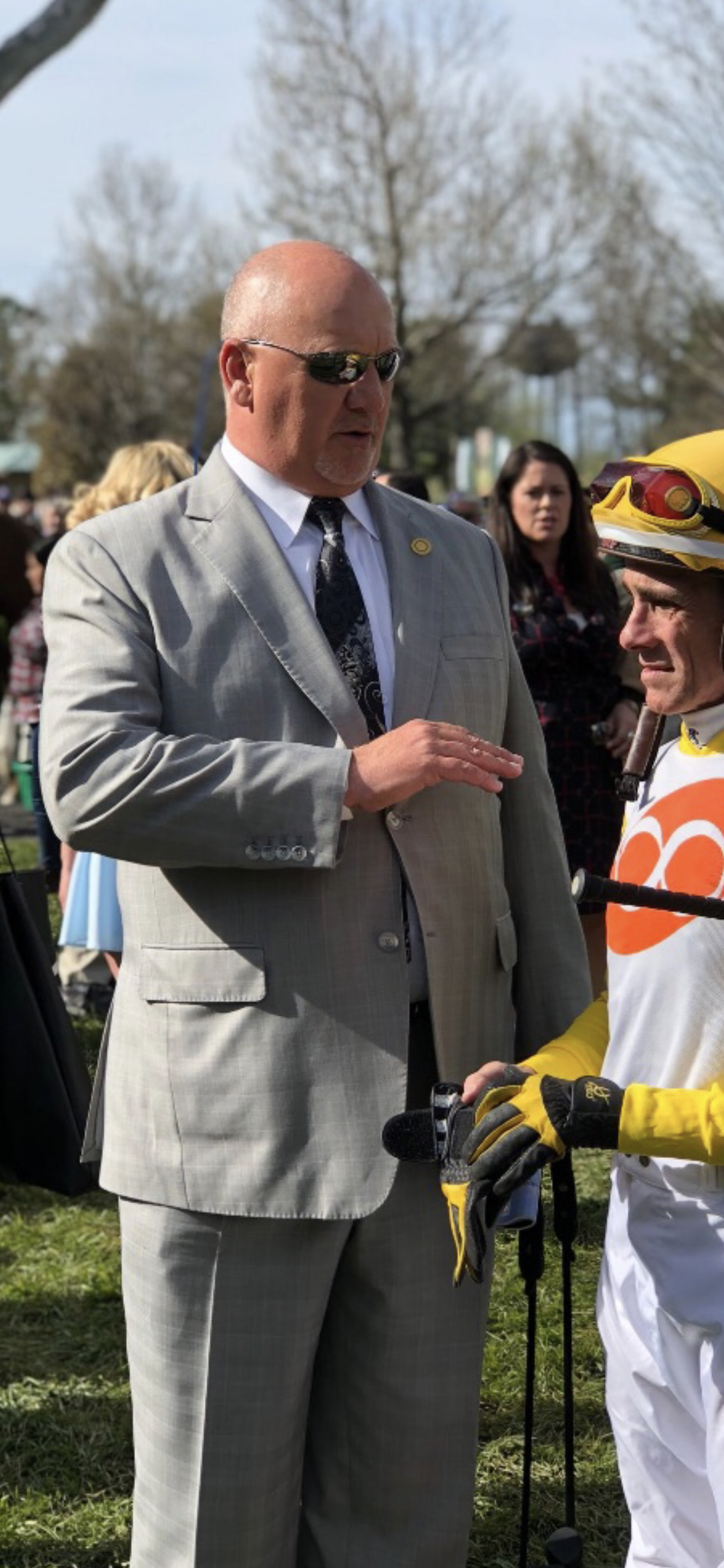
- McPeek in 2018

Personal information
- Born: August 2, 1962 (age 64) Fort Chaffee, Arkansas
- Occupation: Trainer
- Website: www.mcpeekracing.com

Horse racing career
- Sport: Horse racing
- Career wins: 2,050+ (ongoing)

Major racing wins
- Coaching Club American Oaks (2024); Kentucky Oaks (2024); Acorn Stakes (2024); Cotillion Stakes (2024); Southwest Stakes (2024); Fantasy Stakes (2024); Pocahontas Stakes (2015, 2016, 2022, 2023); Ashland Stakes (2002, 2014, 2023); Ben Ali Stakes (2014, 2018, 2023); Alysheba Stakes (2023); Pimlico Special (2023); Blame Stakes (2023); Indiana Oaks (2013, 2022, 2023); Belmont Derby (2022); Jeff Ruby Stakes (2022); Oklahoma Derby (2022); St. Louis Derby (2022); Kentucky Jockey Club Stakes (2001, 2018, 2021); Bourbon Stakes (2010, 2014, 2021); Breeders' Futurity Stakes (1994, 2009, 2021); Falls City Handicap (2020, 2021); Breeders' Futurity Stakes (2009, 2021); Lexington Stakes (2017, 2021); Beholder Mile Stakes (2021); Gulfstream Oaks (2021); Summertime Oaks (2021); Alcibiades Stakes (2000, 2001, 2008, 2018, 2020); Alabama Stakes (2018, 2020); Opening Verse Stakes (2020); Preakness Stakes (2020); Holy Bull Stakes (2019); Louisville Handicap (2007, 2014, 2017, 2018); Iroquois Stakes (2001, 2018); Mrs. Revere Stakes (2018); Modesty Handicap (2018); Bourbonette Oaks (2010, 2016, 2017); Bashford Manor Stakes (2017); American Oaks (2017); Carry Back Stakes(2016); Eclipse Stakes (2014); Sixty Sails Handicap (2014); Commonwealth Stakes (2014); Blue Grass Stakes (2002, 2013); Virginia Derby (2013); Mint Julep Stakes (2011, 2012); Virginia Oaks (2012); Gardenia Stakes (2012); Travers Stakes (2012); Hollywood Starlet Stakes (2012); Dogwood Stakes (2002, 2011); Aristides Stakes (2009, 2011); Rachel Alexandra Stakes (2011); Matt Winn Stakes (2011); Regret Stakes (2011); La Cañada Stakes (2010); Golden Rod Stakes (2010); Beaumont Stakes (1994, 2009); Summer Stakes (2009); Commonwealth Turf Stakes (2008); Delta Jackpot Stakes (2006); Edgewood Stakes (2004, 2005); Gulfstream Park Breeders' Cup Turf Stakes (2004, 2005); Sir Barton Stakes (2003); Ohio Derby (2003); Spinster Stakes (2002, 2003); Fair Grounds Oaks (2002); Florida Derby (2002); Louisiana Derby (2002); Kentucky Cup Juvenile Stakes (1994, 2001); Tropical Park Derby (2000); Tampa Bay Derby (1999); Turfway Championship Handicap (1997); Widener Handicap (1997); Fort Harrod Stakes (1996) American Classic Race wins: Belmont Stakes (2002); Preakness Stakes (2020); Kentucky Derby (2024) Breeders' Cup Wins: Breeders' Cup Distaff (2024)

Racing awards
- Big Sport of Turfdom Award (2002, 2024); Keeneland Training Title Fall Meet (2009, 2011, 2015 tie); Keeneland Training Title Spring Meet (2011)

Significant horses
- Tejano Run, Harlan's Holiday, Sarava, Einstein, Take Charge Lady, Repent, Hard Buck, Noble's Promise, Golden Ticket, Java's War, Daddys Lil Darling, Restless Rider, Swiss Skydiver, Crazy Beautuful, Rattle N Roll, Tiz the Bomb, Envoutante. Smile Happy, Classic Causeway, Defining Purpose, Thorpedo Anna, Mystik Dan
- Updated on May 10, 2024

Kenneth G. McPeek (born August 2, 1962) is an American Thoroughbred racehorse trainer and bloodstock agent. McPeek gained prominence in 2024 by winning the 150th Kentucky Derby in a three-horse photo finish with the 18:1 underdog Mystik Dan and the Kentucky Oaks with Thorpedo Anna. This achievement marked the first time since 1952 that a trainer swept both prestigious races in the same year, making McPeek the third trainer in history to achieve this feat. McPeek expressed that his proudest accomplishment is achieving this success with what he calls "working class horses". The 2024 Derby win also made McPeek one of only five living trainers who have won all three Triple Crown races.

McPeek won his first classic in 2002 with the 70:1 longshot Sarava in the Belmont Stakes. Eighteen years later, he won the 2020 Preakness Stakes with the filly Swiss Skydiver. In 2024, Lexington, Kentucky Mayor Linda Gorton proclaimed July 2 as Kenny McPeek Day in the city, stating "Kenny has accomplished something very few have, and we are excited to honor him and his many achievements. His success and determination are a great example of what's possible here in the Horse Capital of the World."

== Background ==
McPeek was born at the Fort Chafee military base near Fort Smith, Arkansas, while his father, Ron, was stationed with the 101st Airborne Division. His mother went into labor unexpectedly while visiting Ron. Shortly after Kenny's birth, he and his mother returned to their home in Lexington, Kentucky. Since both of his parents grew up in Lexington and McPeek was raised there, he regards himself as a native of the city.

== Life and career ==
McPeek's interest in horses and racing was sparked by his father's ownership of several Thoroughbreds. After earning a degree in business administration from the University of Kentucky, McPeek interviewed for a position as a stockbroker in New York, but decided his career to be in the Thoroughbred racing industry by taking a job as a hot walker for Shug McGaughey.

In 1985 McPeek obtained his training license when his father tasked him with overseeing some of his race horses. McPeek saddled his first winner, Final Destroyer, owned by his father, at River Downs (now known as Belterra Park) in October 1985.

McPeek's first break came in 1991 when he saddled his first First Stakes Winner, Red Wing, at Canterbury Park. Three years later, in 1994, he won his first graded stakes race in the Beaumont Stakes at Keeneland with Her Temper. In 2002, McPeek achieved his first grade 1 win in the Florida Derby at Gulfstream Park with Harlan's Holiday. The following month, he saddled Take Charge Lady to victory in Keeneland's Ashland Stakes. Later that year, with the Triple Crown on the line for War Emblem, McPeek's colt Sarava caused an upset by winning the Belmont Stakes at odds of 70:1. McPeek was also the recipient of Big Sport of Turfdom Award.

By June 2005 McPeek decided to scale back his training operations, feeling that his stable of 160 horses, in six states, had become too large. He chose to focus on being a bloodstock agent, a shift that led to his purchase of the future two-time Horse of the Year, Curlin, at the Keeneland Yearling September Sale for $57,000. McPeek returned to training in the spring of 2006.

In 2006, McPeek purchased the former Pillar Stud Farm, a 115-acre parcel in Lexington, Kentucky, from William du Pont Jr. McPeek renamed the farm to Magdalena Farm in honor of Magdalena Weber Shely (b. 1793), the original matriarch of the land. The office at Magdalena Farm is the home base for McPeek Racing.

McPeek reached significant milestones throughout his career, including his 1,000th career win at Churchill Downs in 2009. In 2012, McPeek won the Travers when Golden Ticket dead-heated with Alpha. McPeek developed the mobile app Horse Racing Now, which provides videos and data to both new and veteran horse players.

In 2018, McPeek purchased Swiss Skydiver for $35,000, who later won the 2020 Preakness Stakes.

By 2024, McPeek had reached 2,000th career wins, with this milestone achieved on February 21, at Turfway Park. On May 4, McPeek's horse Mystik Dan won the 150th Kentucky Derby, giving McPeek individual wins in all three of the American Triple Crown races. As of September 21, McPeek has career earnings of $128,467,789.

== Bloodstock agent ==
McPeek, has built a significant reputation as a bloodstock agent. McPeek's approach to purchasing horses is a system he developed early in his career when working with limited budgets. McPeek's strategy emphasizes the athletic potential of the horse. "I focus on the athlete rather than the pedigree," McPeek has said, underscoring his belief that success on the racetrack outweighs lineage.

One of McPeek's early successes came in 1993 with Tejano Run, a horse he purchased for $6,000 who went on to finish second in the Kentucky Derby and earn $1.1 million in purses throughout his career.

In 2000 McPeek bought a standout horse, Take Charge Lady, for $175,000. Despite her modest pedigree, she won over $2.4 million during her career and became a Blue Hen mare, producing champions like Take Charge Brandi and Omaha Beach.

In 2005, McPeek temporarily stepped away from training to focus more on bloodstock work. This shift led to one of his most famous purchases, Curlin, acquired for a modest sum of $57,000 due to an inflamed ankle. Curlin went on to earn over $10 million and became a leading sire.

In 2022, McPeek purchased a yearling filly by Fast Anna for $40,000, later named Thorpedo Anna. Under his guidance, she went on to earn $2,230,663, with major victories including the Kentucky Oaks, the Acorn Stakes, the Coaching Club American Oaks and lost won the Travers Stakes losing by a head.

== Personal life ==
McPeek has been married twice. His first marriage was to Sue Lustig McPeek, with whom he has a daughter, Jenna McPeek. Jenna graduated with a Bachelor of Science in Biochemistry and Molecular Biology and also majored in Equine Pre-veterinary studies. She was a member of the national championship-winning equestrian team at Otterbein. McPeek's current wife, Sherri, is his primary partner in Magdalena Racing. They married on May 9, 2015, and have a daughter, Annie Franklin McPeek.
