= Fierceness =

American-bred Thoroughbred racehorse

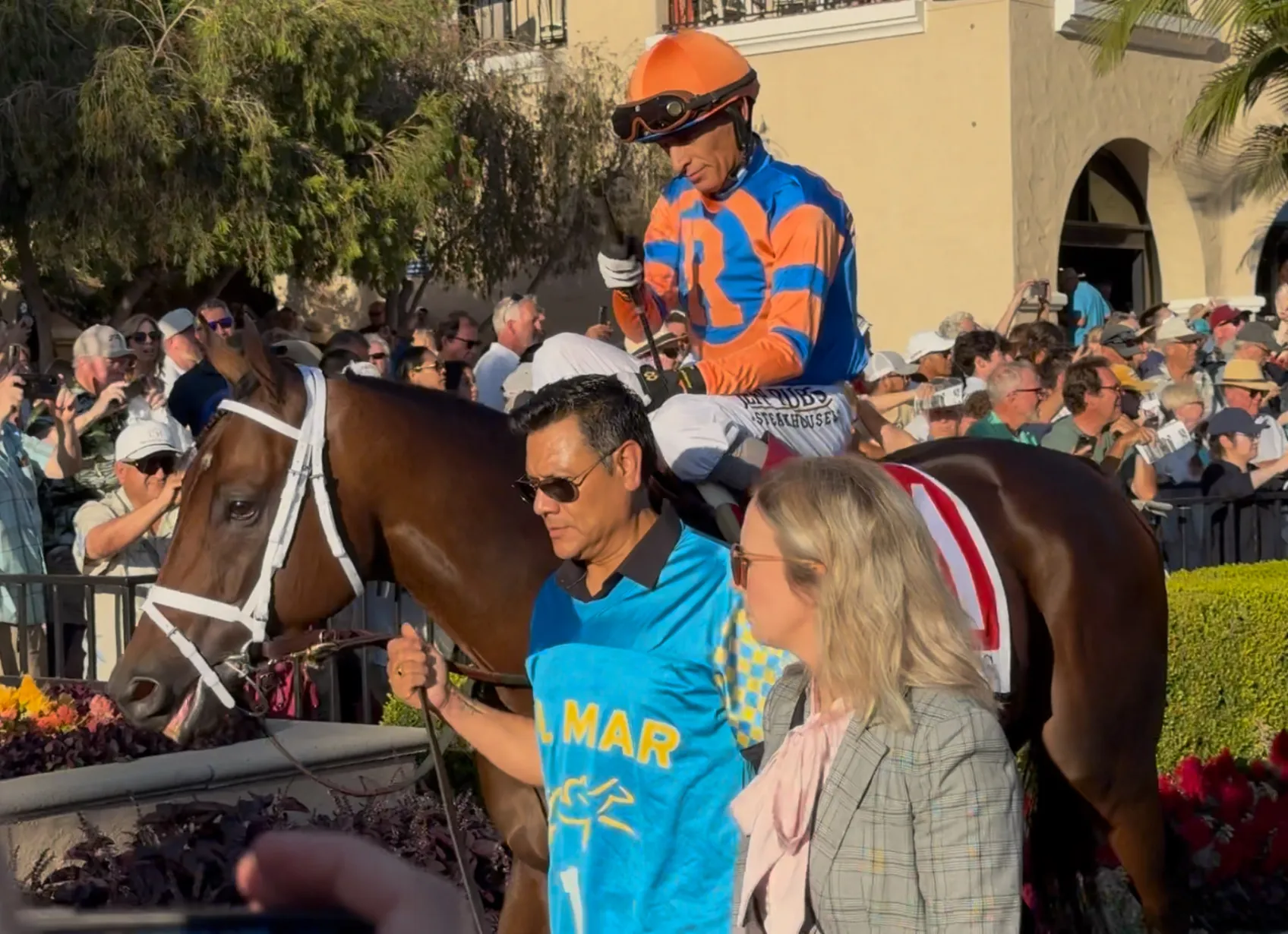
- Fierceness parading before the Pacific Classic in 2025
- Sire: City of Light
- Grandsire: Quality Road
- Dam: Nonna Bella
- Damsire: Stay Thirsty
- Sex: Colt
- Foaled: March 28, 2021
- Country: United States
- Color: Bay
- Breeder: Repole Stables
- Owner: 1. Repole Stables (until 2024); 2. Derrick Smith, Repole Stables, Mrs. John Magnier & Michael Tabor (2025–)
- Trainer: Todd A. Pletcher
- Record: 14: 7–2–3
- Earnings: US$5,785,320

Major wins
- Florida Derby (2024); Jim Dandy Stakes (2024); Travers Stakes (2024); Alysheba Stakes (2025); Pacific Classic Stakes (2025); Breeders' Cup wins: Breeders' Cup Juvenile (2023)

Awards
- American Champion Two-Year-Old Male Horse (2023)
- Last updated on November 2, 2025

Fierceness (foaled March 28, 2021) is a retired champion American Thoroughbred racehorse. In 2023, the two-year-old colt won the Grade 1 Breeders' Cup Juvenile at Santa Anita Park en route to being named Champion Two-Year-Old Male Horse in 2023. In 2024, he won the Grade I Florida Derby by a record 13 1/2 lengths and the Travers Stakes.

== Background ==
Fierceness is a bay colt who was bred and owned by Mike Repole. He was bred in Kentucky. Fierceness is the lone runner and winner of three foals of racing age out of the winning Stay Thirsty mare Nonna Bella. The dam also has a yearling full brother to Fierceness and a Caravaggio filly born in 2023. Repole raced both Nonna Bella and Stay Thirsty and is a shareholder in Fierceness's sire City of Light, who stands stud at Lane's End Farm in Versailles, Kentucky.

Fierceness' full-brother Mentee, in his June 15 debut in the seventh race of a five-furlong maiden special weight at Aqueduct Racetrack bested Colloquial by a nose in the track-record time of 56.97 seconds, standing since 1963.

Fierceness is trained by U.S. Racing Hall of Fame trainer Todd A. Pletcher.

== Career ==
=== 2023: two-year-old season ===
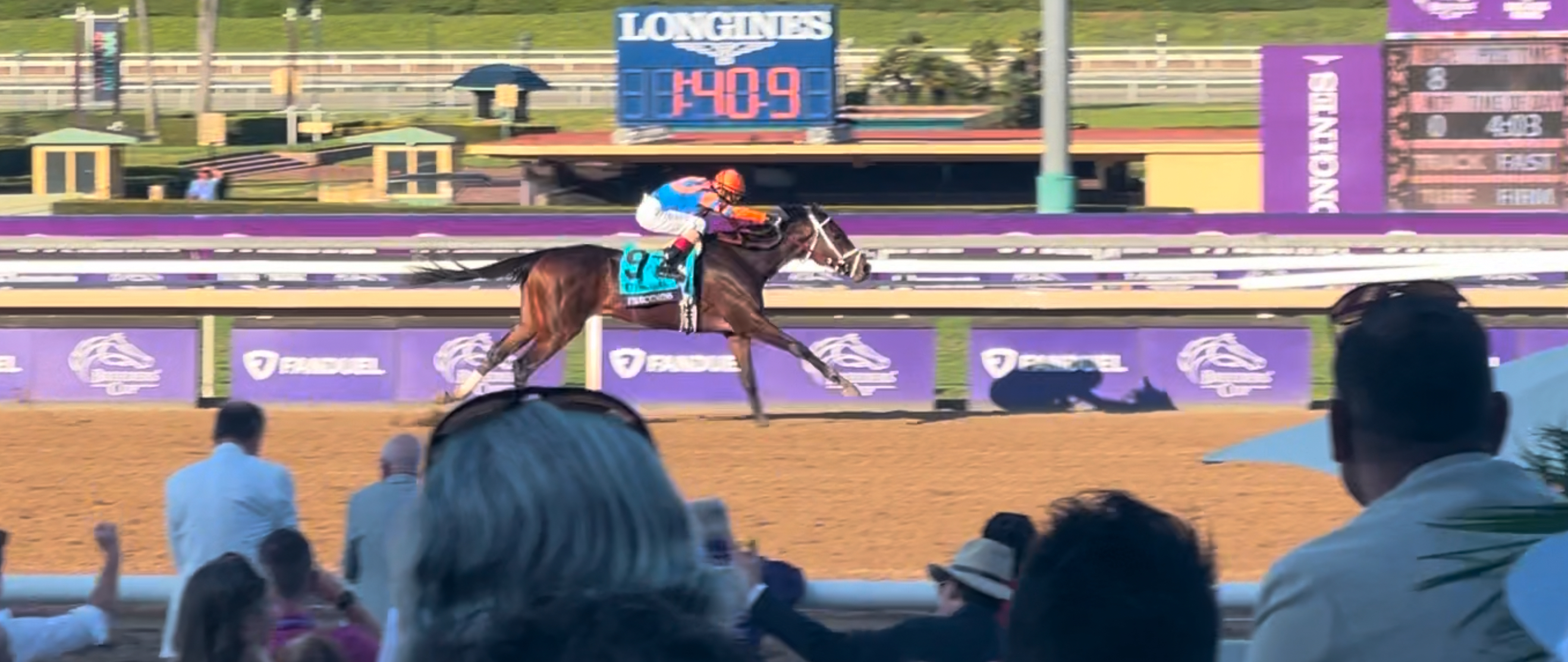
Fierceness at the Breeders Cup Juvenile

Fierceness made his debut on August 25 in a maiden special weight event over six furlongs at Saratoga. From post six in a field of ten, he was sent to the lead in the first quarter-mile. On the sealed, muddy track, he shook off his competition, extending his lead before being geared down by jockey Jose Ortiz to win by 11 1/4 lengths in a time 1:09.56.

His connections then entered Fierceness in the Grade I Champagne Stakes at Aqueduct Racetrack. On October 7 in a field of eight, Fierceness started as the 11-20 favorite. At the start of the race, he lunged out of the gate, unbalancing jockey Jose Ortiz. He finished seventh behind winner Timberlake. A check-up after the race revealed nothing amiss with the colt, so trainer Todd Pletcher and owner Mike Repole decided to consider the Breeders' Cup Juvenile. The horse trained at Keeneland in company with stablemates and was shipped to Santa Anita Park for the Breeders' Cup on October 28.

In a field of nine starters for the Breeders' Cup Juvenile, Fierceness had 16–1 odds. John Velazquez took over as the jockey, and Fierceness started well with him on the outside of leader General Partner, who had finished second in the Champagne Stakes in his previous start, through fractions of :23.25, :47.02, and 1:10.86. Fierceness kicked into gear on the second turn and through the stretch. He opened up a two-length lead ahead of a rallying Muth an eighth of a mile before the finish and continued to extend the margin to a 6 1/4 lengths victory in a fast time of 1:41.90. "I don't think too many people would have run him other than Todd and I," Repole said. "And so we said, let's see how he trains and he's got to sell us on the idea of running, and he did come back with two really good works," Pletcher said. "So we took a shot, and today it worked out; a beautiful trip, and he showed what he's all about."

Fierceness was named the 2023 Champion Two-Year-Old Male Horse during the Eclipse Award ceremony in January 2024. Fierceness was an early favorite for the 2024 Kentucky Derby; he earned 30 qualifying points toward the 2024 Road to the Kentucky Derby, leaving him in first place on the Kentucky Derby Leaderboard.

=== 2024: three-year-old season ===
On February 3, 2024, Fierceness began his three-year-old in the Grade III Holy Bull Stakes at Gulfstream Park. Starting as the 1/5 favorite, he settled for third after locking strides with the winner, Hades, around the final turn. The final time was 1:46.07.

Fierceness’ next start was on March 30 in the Grade I Florida Derby. He started well, and jockey John Velazquez had him settled forward. Soon he was in front setting fractions of :24.06, :47.50, 1:11.31, and 1:35.63. In the stretch run, he pulled away to win by a record margin of thirteen-and-a-half lengths for the event in 1:48.22.

Fierceness earned 100 points in qualification standings in the Road to the Kentucky Derby and entered the Kentucky Derby as one of the probable favorites. The win was the second straight for trainer Todd A. Pletcher and owner Repole Stable, who took the 2023 event with 2022 champion 2-year-old male Forte.

In December 2024, Fierceness underwent a successful elective surgery for treatment of his hind ankle in Kentucky.

== Statistics ==
| Date | Distance | Race | Grade | Track | Odds | Field | Finish | Winning Time | Winning (Losing) Margin | Jockey | Ref |
|---|---|---|---|---|---|---|---|---|---|---|---|
2023 – Two-year-old season
| Aug 25, 2023 | 6 furlongs | Maiden Special Weight | | Saratoga | 1.10* | 8 | 1 | 1:09.56 | 11 1/4 lengths | Jose L. Ortiz | |
| Oct 7, 2023 | 1 mile | Champagne Stakes | I | Aqueduct | 0.55* | 8 | 7 | 1:35.90 | (20 1/4 lengths) | Jose L. Ortiz | |
| Nov 3, 2023 | 1 1/16 miles | Breeders' Cup Juvenile | I | Santa Anita | 16.50 | 9 | 1 | 1:41.90 | 6 1/4 lengths | John R. Velazquez | |
2024 – Three-year-old season
| Feb 3, 2024 | 1 1/16 miles | Holy Bull Stakes | III | Gulfstream Park | 0.20* | 7 | 3 | 1:46.07 | (3 1/2 lengths) | John R. Velazquez | |
| Mar 30, 2024 | 1 1/8 miles | Florida Derby | I | Gulfstream Park | 1.10* | 9 | 1 | 1:48.22 | 13 1/2 lengths | John R. Velazquez | |
| May 4, 2024 | 1 1/4 miles | Kentucky Derby | I | Churchill Downs | 3.21* | 20 | 15 | 2:03.34 | (24 1/2 lengths) | John R. Velazquez | |
| Jul 27, 2024 | 1 1/8 miles | Jim Dandy Stakes | II | Saratoga | 1.80 | 6 | 1 | 1:49.15 | 1 length | John R. Velazquez | |
| Aug 24, 2024 | 1 1/4 miles | Travers Stakes | I | Saratoga | 3.90 | 8 | 1 | 2:01.79 | head | John R. Velazquez | |
| Nov 2, 2024 | 1 1/4 miles | Breeders' Cup Classic | I | Del Mar | 2.80* | 14 | 2 | 2:00.78 | (1 1/2 lengths) | John R. Velazquez | |
2025 – Four-year-old season
| May 2, 2025 | 1 1/16 miles | Alysheba Stakes | II | Churchill Downs | 0.94* | 6 | 1 | 1:40.66 (Note: Fierceness sets new a track record for the 1 1/16 miles distance) | 1 1/2 lengths | John R. Velazquez | |
| Jun 7, 2025 | 1 mile | Metropolitan Handicap | I | Saratoga | 0.75* | 5 | 2 | 1:35.89 | (2 1/2 lengths) | John R. Velazquez | |
| Aug 2, 2025 | 1 1/8 miles | Whitney Stakes | I | Saratoga | 1.20* | 9 | 5 | 1:48.92 | (5 3/4 lengths) | John R. Velazquez | |
| Aug 30, 2025 | 1 1/4 miles | Pacific Classic | I | Del Mar | 1.60 | 7 | 1 | 2:01.00 | 3 1/4 lengths | John R. Velazquez | |
| Nov 1, 2025 | 1 1/4 miles | Breeders' Cup Classic | I | Del Mar | 3.40* | 9 | 3 | 2:00.19 | (1 1/2 lengths) | John R. Velazquez | |

Notes:
An (*) asterisk after the odds means Fierceness was the post-time favorite.

== Pedigree ==
Pedigree of Fierceness, bay colt, March 28, 2021
| Sire City of Light (2014) | Quality Road (2006) | Elusive Quality (1993) | Gone West (1984) |
| Sire City of Light (2014) | Quality Road (2006) | Elusive Quality (1993) | Touch of Greatness (1986) |
| Sire City of Light (2014) | Quality Road (2006) | Kobia (1995) | Strawberry Road (AUS) (1979) |
| Sire City of Light (2014) | Quality Road (2006) | Kobia (1995) | Winglet (1988) |
| Sire City of Light (2014) | Paris Notion (1998) | Dehere (1991) | Deputy Minister (CAN) (1979) |
| Sire City of Light (2014) | Paris Notion (1998) | Dehere (1991) | Sister Dot (1985) |
| Sire City of Light (2014) | Paris Notion (1998) | Fabulous Notion (1980) | Somethingfabulous (1972) |
| Sire City of Light (2014) | Paris Notion (1998) | Fabulous Notion (1980) | Careless Notion (1970) |
| Dam Nonna Belle (2014) | Stay Thirsty (2008) | Bernardini (2003) | A.P. Indy (1989) |
| Dam Nonna Belle (2014) | Stay Thirsty (2008) | Bernardini (2003) | Cara Rafaela (1993) |
| Dam Nonna Belle (2014) | Stay Thirsty (2008) | Marozia (1994) | Storm Bird (1978) |
| Dam Nonna Belle (2014) | Stay Thirsty (2008) | Marozia (1994) | Make Change (1975) |
| Dam Nonna Belle (2014) | Nonna Mia (2007) | Empire Maker (2000) | Unbridled (1987) |
| Dam Nonna Belle (2014) | Nonna Mia (2007) | Empire Maker (2000) | Toussaud (1989) |
| Dam Nonna Belle (2014) | Nonna Mia (2007) | Holy Bubbette (2000) | Holy Bull (1991) |
| Dam Nonna Belle (2014) | Nonna Mia (2007) | Holy Bubbette (2000) | Juliac (1983) (family: 20) |
