= 2017 Breeders' Cup Classic =

Thoroughbred horse race

34th Breeders' Cup Classic
- Breeders' Cup Classic
- Location: Del Mar Racetrack
- Date: November 4, 2017
- Winning horse: Gun Runner
- Winning time: 2:01.29
- Jockey: Florent Geroux
- Trainer: Steve Asmussen
- Owner: Winchell Thoroughbreds & Three Chimneys Farm
- Conditions: Fast
- Surface: Dirt
- Attendance: 37,692

The 2017 Breeders' Cup Classic was the 34th running of the Breeders' Cup Classic, part of the 2017 Breeders' Cup World Thoroughbred Championships program. It was run on November 4, 2017, at Del Mar Racetrack in Del Mar, California with a purse of $6,000,000. It was expected to be a showdown between the top two horses in North America, Gun Runner and Arrogate, with several other Grade/Group 1 winners providing additional depth in an 11 horse field. However, Arrogate broke poorly and was never a factor in the race. Gun Runner led for most of the race and scored a comfortable victory, likely wrapping up Horse of the Year honors.

The Classic is run on dirt at one mile and one-quarter (approximately 2000 m). It is run under weight-for-age conditions, with entrants carrying the following weights:

- Northern Hemisphere three-year-olds: 122 lb
- Southern Hemisphere three-year-olds: 117 lb
- Four-year-olds and up: 126 lb
- Any fillies or mares receive a 3 lb allowance

== Contenders ==
The 2017 Classic was the final encounter between Arrogate, who won the 2016 Classic, and Gun Runner. Arrogate beat Gun Runner in the 2017 Dubai World Cup in an outstanding performance that made him the world's top ranked racehorse. After returning to North America, Arrogate finished a distant fourth in the San Diego Handicap at Del Mar Racetrack, leaving questions about whether he liked the surface or if he was no longer at peak ability. He then finished second in the Pacific Classic and trainer Bob Baffert decided to train the colt up to the Classic – a layoff of over two months.

By contrast, Gun Runner had steadily improved in the summer of 2017, easily winning both the Stephen Foster Handicap and Whitney Stakes. In his final prep for the Classic, he won the Woodward Stakes by 10 1/4 lengths. Based on these strong performances, Gun Runner was made the slight morning-line favorite for the Classic at 9–5, with Arrogate at 2–1. One question mark was that Gun Runner had never won at the distance of 10 furlongs.

Other leading contenders included:

- Collected, who defeated Arrogate in the Pacific Classic at Del Mar while leading wire-to-wire
- West Coast, winner of the Travers Stakes
- Mubtaahij, winner of the Jockey Club Gold Cup

In the post position draw held on October 30, Arrogate drew post 1 on the rail. To avoid getting trapped in traffic, jockey Mike Smith announced that he would ride the colt aggressively from the starting gate. Gun Runner drew the more favorable post position 5.

Trainer Bob Baffert had a record four horses in the field – Arrogate, Collected, West Coast and Mubtaahij – all of whom were given strong chances to win. Baffert said of Gun Runner, "He's the only thing between me and a big, fat check." Baffert had won the Classic three years in a row with Bayern, American Pharoah and Arrogate.

Irish trainer Aidan O'Brien had two entries, Churchill and War Decree, neither of which has previously raced on the dirt. Churchill, a dual classic winner at a mile, was given the best chance of the two. "He is very like Giant's Causeway", said O'Brien. "He is miler that you would like to think will get a mile and a quarter."

== Race Description ==
Gun Runner broke well and quickly moved up to the lead with Collected pressing him on the outside. Gun Runner ran a fast opening quarter, then moved easily around the first turn and down the backstretch as jockey Florent Geroux kept him on a loose rein. Rounding the final turn, Collected closed ground and the two were head-and-head with a quarter of a mile remaining. Entering the stretch, Gun Runner responded to the challenge and pulled away, winning by 2 1/4 lengths. Collected held on for second while West Coast was third.

Gun Runner's win came against an apparent track bias: in most other races that week at Del Mar, races had been won by horses that raced off the rail and came from behind. "My horse was very comfortable right there, and flopping his ear back and forth", said Geroux. "I just tried to keep him as happy as I could."

By contrast, Arrogate ducked in at the start and lost over 11 lengths to Gun Runner during the first quarter mile. Never a factor in the race, he made a mild rally in the stretch to finish in a dead heat for fifth place with Gunnevera. "He just can't find the plate", said Baffert. "I hate to make excuses for the big horse, but he's just not the horse he was."

The performance solidified Gun Runner's bid for American Horse of the Year honors, based on his record of five wins and a second from six starts during 2017.

== Results ==
Finish	Program Number	Horse	Trainer	Jockey	Morning Line Odds	Final Odds	Margin	Winnings
1	5	Gun Runner	Steve Asmussen	Florent Geroux	9-5	2.40	2 1/4 lengths	$3,300,000
2	11	Collected	Bob Baffert	Martin Garcia	6-1	5.90	1 1/4 lengths	$1,020,000
3	8	West Coast	Bob Baffert	Javier Castellano	6-1	4.20	1/2 lengths	$540,000
4	4	War Story	Jorge Navarro	José Ortiz	30-1	56.10	2 1/4 lengths	$300,000
5	1	Arrogate	Bob Baffert	Mike Smith	2-1	2.10	dead heat	$120,000
5	9	Gunnevera	Antonio Sano	Antonio Sano	30-1	15.00	12 1/4 lengths	$120,000
7	7	Churchill (IRE)	Aidan O'Brien	Ryan Moore	15-1	19.80	1/2 length	$60,000
8	6	Mubtaahij (IRE)	Bob Baffert	Drayden Van Dyke	12-1	20.40	4 1/4 lengths	$60,000
9	2	War Decree	Aidan O'Brien	Seamie Heffernan	30-1	44.80	10 3/4 lengths	-
10	10	Pavel	Doug O'Neill	Mario Gutierrez	20-1	28.00	7 lengths	-
11	3	Win the Space	George Papaprodromou	Joe Talamo	30-1	78.70	-	-

Times: 1/4 – 0:22.50; 1/2 – 0:46.31; 3/4 – 1:10.50; mile – 1:35.03; final – 2:01.29.
Fractional Splits: (:22.50) (:23.81) (:24.19) (:24.53) (:26.26)

Source: Equibase Chart

== Payout ==
Payout Schedule:

Program Number	Horse	Win	Place	Show
5	Gun Runner	6.80	4.40	3.20
11	Collected		5.60	4.00
8	West Coast			3.60

- $1 Exacta (5-11) Paid $17.00
- $1 Trifecta (5-11-8) Paid $64.50
- $1 Superfecta (5-11-8-4) Paid $1,433.50
