= 2017 Dubai World Cup =

22nd Dubai World Cup
- Dubai World Cup
- Location: Meydan
- Date: 25 March 2017
- Winning horse: Arrogate (USA)
- Jockey: Mike Smith
- Trainer: Bob Baffert (USA)
- Owner: Juddmonte Farms
- Surface: Dirt

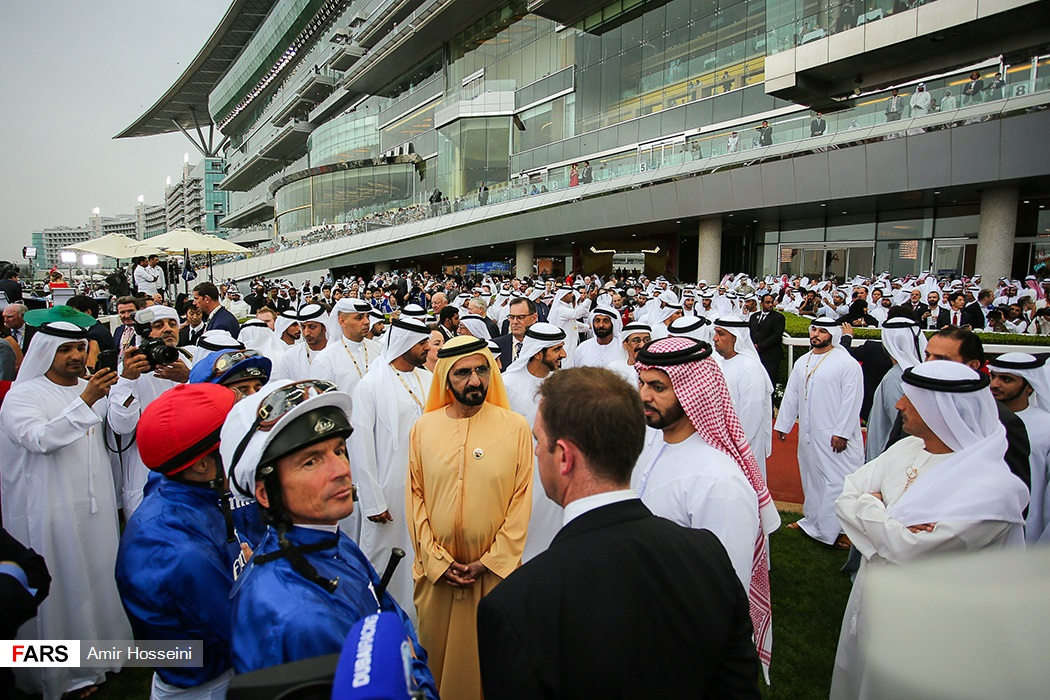

The 2017 Dubai World Cup was a horse race held at Meydan Racecourse on Saturday 25 March 2017. It was the 22nd running of the Dubai World Cup and the third running of the race since the synthetic Tapeta surface was replaced by a dirt track.

The winner was Juddmonte Farm's Arrogate, a four-year-old grey colt trained in the United States by Bob Baffert and ridden by Mike Smith. Arrogate's victory was the third in the race for Baffert after Silver Charm in 1998 and Captain Steve in 2001 and was the first in the race for his jockey and owner.

== The contenders ==
The race had a strong North American challenge headed by Arrogate, who had begun his 2017 campaign by winning the Travers Stakes in record time. The other runners from the United States were Gun Runner, Keen Ice, Hoppertunity (Clark Handicap, Jockey Club Gold Cup) and Neolithic. The United Arab Emirates was represented by Mubtaahij (UAE Derby), Move Up (Bosphorus Cup), Special Fighter (Al Maktoum Challenge, Round 3, 2016), Long River (Al Maktoum Challenge, Round 3, 2017) and the Chilean-bred mare Furia Cruzada (Al Maktoum Challenge, Round 2). The other four runners were the Japanese challengers Gold Dream (February Stakes), Awardee (JBC Classic), Apollo Kentucky (Tokyo Daishoten) and Lani (3rd in the Belmont Stakes).

Betting is illegal in Dubai, but British bookmakers made Arrogate the 1/3 favourite ahead of Gun Runner on 7/1. The only other runners given any chance according to the betting were Hoppertunity, Move Up and Mubtaahij who started at 16/1.

== The race ==
Arrogate was hampered at the start and dropped back to the rear of the field. Long River set the early pace ahead of Gun Runner and Neolithic with Mubtaahij close behind. Few of the other runners were ever in contention. With half a mile left to run Gun Runner went to the front and Long River quickly dropped away. Gun Runner turned for home with a clear advantage but Arrogate produced a sustained run on the outside, took the lead 200 metres from the finish and drew away to win "comfortably" by two and a quarter lengths. Neolithic was five lengths away in third ahead of Mubtaahi, Awardee, Hoppertunity and Keen Ice with the other seven finishers trailing in at long intervals.

== Race details ==
- Sponsor: Emirates
- Purse: £8,130,081; First prize: £4,878,048
- Surface: Dirt
- Going: Muddy
- Distance: 10 furlongs
- Number of runners: 14
- Winner's time: 2:02.15

== Full result ==
Pos.	Marg.	Horse (bred)	Age	Jockey	Trainer (Country)	Odds
1		Arrogate (USA)	4	Mike Smith	Bob Baffert (USA)	1/3 fav
2	2¼	Gun Runner (USA)	4	Florent Geroux	Steve Asmussen (USA)	7/1
3	5	Neolithic (USA)	4	John Velazquez	Todd Pletcher (USA)	25/1
4	1¾	Mubtaahij (IRE)	6	Christophe Soumillon	Mike de Kock (UAE)	16/1
5	1½	Awardee (USA)	7	Yutaka Take	Mikio Matsunaga (JPN)	66/1
6	nk	Hoppertunity (USA)	6	Flavien Prat	Bob Baffert (USA)	16/1
7	1	Keen Ice (USA)	5	Javier Castellano	Todd Pletcher (USA)	33/1
8	4	Lani (USA)	4	Ryan Moore	Mikio Matsunaga (JPN)	100/1
9	5	Apollo Kentucky (USA)	5	Christophe Lemaire	Kenji Yamauchi (JPN)	66/1
10	2¾	Move Up (GB)	4	Adrie de Vries	Saeed bin Suroor (UAE)	50/1
11	8	Long River (USA)	7	Mickael Barzalona	Salem bin Ghadayer (UAE)	50/1
12	15	Special Fighter (IRE)	6	Fernando Jara	Maria Ritchie (UAE)	40/1
13	½	Furia Cruzada (CHI)	5	Antonio Fresu	Erwan Charpy (UAE)	100/1
14	13½	Gold Dream (JPN)	4	João Moreira	Osamu Hirata (JPN)	50/1

- Abbreviations: nse = nose; nk = neck; shd = head; hd = head

== Winner's details ==
Further details of the winner, Arrogate

- Sex: Colt
- Foaled: 11 April 2013
- Country: United States
- Sire: Unbridled's Song; Dam: Bubbler (Distorted Humor)
- Owner: Juddmonte Farms
- Breeder: Clearsky Farms
