= 2017 Breeders' Cup =

Thoroughbred horse racing event

- Class: Championship Event Series
- Location: Del Mar Racetrack
- Race type: Thoroughbred
- Website: www.breederscup.com

Race information
- Distance: See individual races
- Surface: Turf, Dirt
- Purse: Varies by Race; Between $1 million – $6 million

The 2017 Breeders' Cup World Championships was the 34th edition of the premier event of the North American thoroughbred horse racing year. The 13 races, all of which were Grade I, took place on November 3 and 4 at Del Mar Racetrack in Del Mar, California and were telecast by NBC and NBC Sports. The Breeders' Cup is generally regarded as the end of the North America racing season, although a few Grade I events take place in later November and December.

The highlight of the event was Gun Runner's victory in the Classic, likely wrapping up Horse of the Year honors. Forever Unbridled, Roy H and World Approval likely wrapped up divisional Eclipse Awards with victories in the Distaff, Sprint and Mile respectively. The event featured many longshot winners, including Bar of Gold at 66–1, the second largest payout in the event's history.

== Breeders' Cup Challenge series ==
The Breeders' Cup Challenge is a series of races that provide the winners of designated races with automatic "Win and You're In" berths in a specified division of the Breeders' Cup. Fifty pre-entrants in the 2017 Breeders' Cup qualified via the Challenge series, which was particularly important as seven of the Breeders' Cup races were oversubscribed. A maximum of 14 horses (12 in the Turf Sprint) are allowed to start in each race. Winners of the Challenge races are given automatic entries, while other pre-entries are ranked by a points system and the judgement of a panel of experts.

Five winners of Challenge series races went on to win their respective division at the Breeders' Cup:

- Gun Runner, who won the Classic, automatically qualified by winning both the Stephen Foster and Whitney Handicap
- Forever Unbridled won the Distaff after automatically qualifying with victories in both the Fleur de Lis and Personal Ensign
- Rushing Fall qualified in the Jessamine Stakes then went on to win the Juvenile Turf
- Roy H won the Santa Anita Sprint Championship and the Sprint
- World Approval won both the Woodbine Mile and Breeders' Cup Mile

== Event preparation ==
The Breeders' Cup organization announced in 2014 that Del Mar would host the event for the first time in 2017. Del Mar is best known for its prestigious summer meet, highlighted by the Pacific Classic. However, its seating capacity is notably lower than most other tracks at which the Breeders' Cup is run such as Santa Anita and Churchill Downs. As a result, Del Mar limited the attendance to 37,500 for both Friday and Saturday (compared to the 2016 figures of 45,000 on Friday and over 70,000 on Saturday at Santa Anita). Despite this, ticket revenues were higher than in 2016 because Del Mar designed many premium seating options.

To accommodate the event, Del Mar widened its turf course to be able to handle 14 horses. Because of the dimensions of track, the distances for two races were altered: the Turf Sprint was shortened to 5 furlongs (normally 6 1/2) and the Filly & Mare Turf was shortened to 1 1/8 miles (normally 1 1/4). Del Mar built temporary seating areas and upgraded the television monitors and video board. In response to unusually heavy fatalities during its 2016 summer meet, Del Mar revamped the main track to increase the banking on the turns and even out the surface. There were no life-threatening injuries during the 13 Breeders' Cup races.

For 2017, the Breeders' Cup announced that they would be performing out-of-competition testing on roughly 90% of horses (up from 40%-60%), including all North American Breeders' Cup Challenge race winners and at least one horse from each trainer. They also made a rule change that required horses who have been administered anabolic steroids for therapeutic purposes to miss six months of racing. The previous rule required a 60-day delay, with some state-to-state variation in how the rule was administered. This inconsistency had resulted in the disqualification of Masochistic from a second-place finish in the 2016 Sprint.

On October 25, the Breeders' Cup announced that 187 horses had been pre-entered for the event, including nine returning or former champions: Arrogate, Highland Reel, Drefong, Oscar Performance, Lady Eli, Champagne Room, Queen's Trust, Finest City, and Mongolian Saturday. The early entries included a record 46 horses from Europe, 14 of which were trained by Aidan O'Brien.

== Results ==
The configuration of the Del Mar racetrack influenced many races and perhaps contributed to a rash of upsets – just one favorite won on each of Friday and Saturday. In particular, Del Mar has a relatively short homestretch compared to most other major racetracks, which made it difficult for horses to close from far back. According to handicapper Mike Watchmaker, the track had a strong bias towards horses racing on the outside. Only one horse won in front-running fashion: Gun Runner in the Classic.

Javier Castellano earned the Shoemaker Award for outstanding jockey at the Breeders' Cup with one win aboard Rushing Fall, a second and a third. John Velazquez was the only jockey with multiple wins, taking the Distaff with Forever Unbridled and the Mile on World Approval. William Buick and Mickael Barzalona earned their first Breeders' Cup wins, both riding for Godolphin.

Local trainer Peter Miller earned his first Breeders' Cup victory with Stormy Liberal in the Turf Sprint, then earned his second just hours later with Roy H in the Sprint. Chad Brown also trained two Breeders' Cup winners, including Good Magic in the Juvenile.

The total betting handle over two days was $166.1 million, up 5.5% over 2016 at Santa Anita and up 6.8% compared to 2015 at Keeneland. Of this, $25,181,317 was bet at Del Mar itself, up sharply from $20,742,847 in 2016 despite the much lower attendance

=== Friday, November 3 ===
On Friday, November 3, the first four Breeders' Cup races were run before a crowd of 32,278. The highlight of the day was Forever Unbridled's win in the Distaff, in which she defeated a strong contingent of three-year-old fillies led by Abel Tasman. The Juvenile Turf was won by Mendelssohn, a half-brother to champion Beholder who sold at auction for $3 million. Mendelssohn gave trainer Aidan O'Brien his 27th Grade I/Group One victory in 2017, adding to his world record. O'Brien advised that Mendelssohn would be considered for the 2018 Kentucky Derby.

Race name	Post time (Pacific)	Sponsor	Distance/Surface	Restrictions	Purse	Winner (Bred)	Odds	Margin
Juvenile Fillies Turf	2:25 PM		1 mile (Turf)	2-year-old fillies	$1 million	Rushing Fall	3.00	3/4 length
Dirt Mile	3:05 PM	City of Las Vegas	1 mile	3 yrs+	$1 million	Battle of Midway	14.20	1/2 length
Juvenile Turf	3:50 PM		1 mile (Turf)	2-year-old colts and geldings	$1 million	Mendelssohn	4.80	1 1/4 lengths
Distaff	4:35 PM	Longines	1 1/8 miles	3 yrs+ fillies & mares	$2 million	Forever Unbridled	3.70	1/2 length

Source: Equibase Charts

=== Saturday, November 4 ===
The highlight of the day was Gun Runner's commanding victory in the Breeders' Cup Classic, which likely wrapped up Horse of the Year honors. Gun Runner was the only horse to overcome an apparent track bias that favored horses racing from off the pace and on the outside. West Coast's third-place finish was likely good enough to earn him champion three-year-old honors combined with earlier wins in the Travers Stakes and Pennsylvania Derby.

The only favorite to win on Saturday was World Approval in the Mile, solidifying his bid for champion turf horse honors. In the Sprint, Roy H scored a mild upset and moved to the top of his division.

In the Juvenile, Good Magic became the first maiden to ever win a Breeders' Cup race. His clear victory, combined with a strong second-place performance in the Champagne Stakes, moved him to the top of the two-year-old colt division and made him the likely winter book favorite for the 2018 Kentucky Derby.

The day featured several wins by longshots, including Bar of Gold who won the Filly & Mare Sprint by a nose at 66–1, the second largest payout in Breeders' Cup history. Stormy Liberal won by a head at odds of 30–1 in the Turf Sprint.

Race Name	Post time (Pacific)	Sponsor	Distance/Surface	Restrictions	Purse	Winner (Bred)	Odds	Margin
Juvenile Fillies	12:00 PM	14 Hands Winery	1 1/16 miles	2-year-old fillies	$2 million	Caledonia Road	17.30	3 1/4 lengths
Turf Sprint	12:37 PM		5 furlongs (Turf)	3 yrs+	$1 million	Stormy Liberal	30.20	Head
Filly & Mare Sprint	1:14 PM		7 furlongs	3 yrs+ fillies & mares	$1 million	Bar of Gold	66.70	Nose
Filly & Mare Turf	2:00 PM		1 1/8 miles (Turf)	3 yrs+ fillies and mares	$2 million	Wuheida (GB)	11.20	1 length
Sprint	2:37 PM	TwinSpires	6 furlongs	3 yrs+	$1.5 million	Roy H	4.90	1 length
Mile	3:19 PM		1 mile (Turf)	3 yrs+	$2 million	World Approval	2.70	1 1/4 lengths
Juvenile	3:58 PM	Sentient Jet	1 1/16 miles	2-year-old colts and geldings	$2 million	Good Magic	11.50	4 1/4 lengths
Turf	4:37 PM	Longines	1 1/2 miles (Turf)	3 yrs+	$4 million	Talismanic (GB)	14.10	1/2 length
Classic	5:35 PM		1 1/4 miles	3 yrs+	$6 million	Gun Runner	2.40	2 1/4 lengths

Source: Equibase Charts
