= 2016 Breeders' Cup Classic =

Thoroughbred horse race

33rd Breeders' Cup Classic
- Breeders' Cup Classic
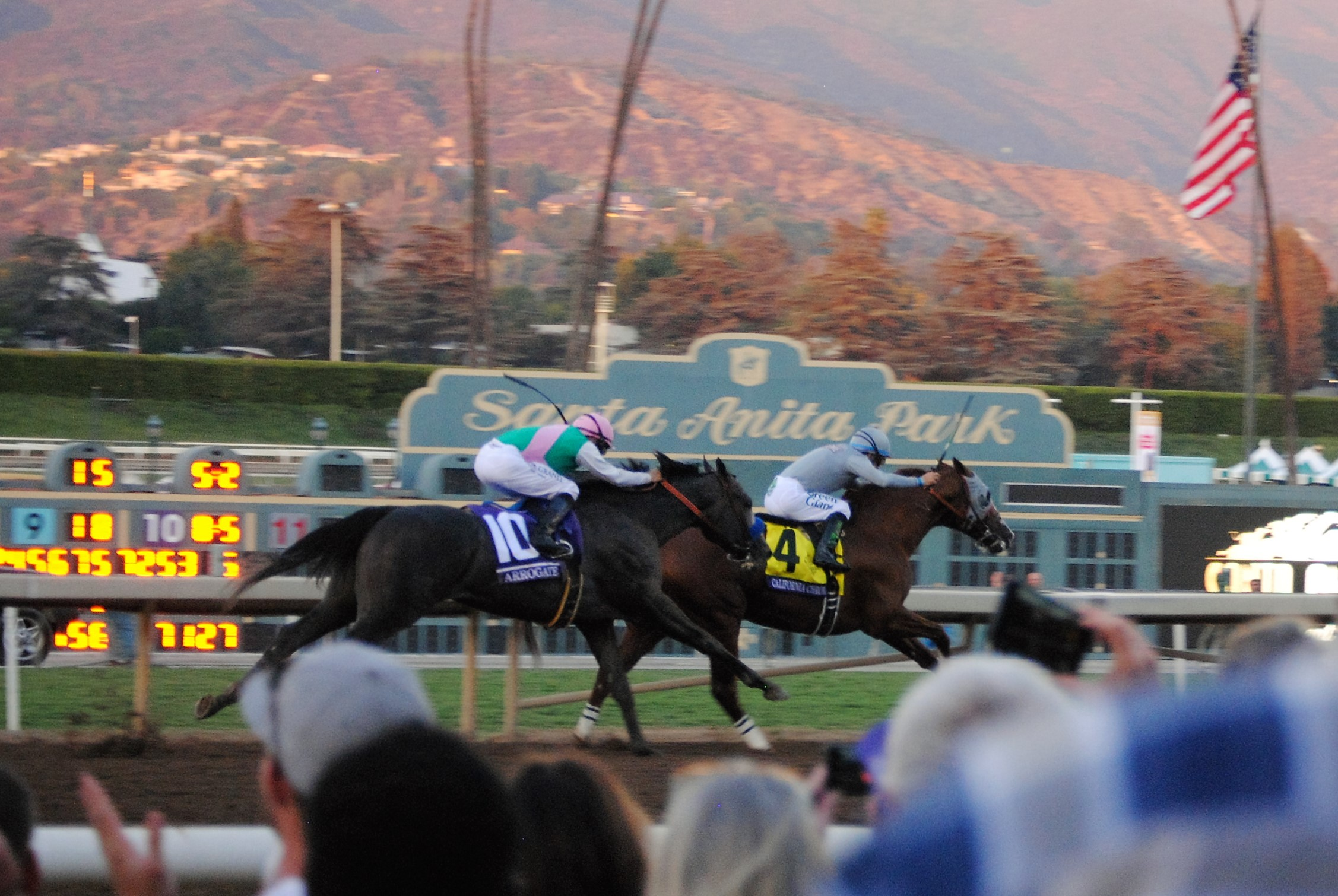
- Arrogate chases down California Chrome in the 2016 Breeders' Cup Classic
- Location: Santa Anita Park
- Date: November 5, 2016
- Winning horse: Arrogate
- Jockey: Mike E. Smith
- Trainer: Bob Baffert
- Owner: Juddmonte Farms
- Conditions: fast
- Surface: Dirt
- Attendance: 72,811

The 2016 Breeders' Cup Classic was the 33rd running of the Breeders' Cup Classic, part of the 2016 Breeders' Cup World Thoroughbred Championships program. It was run on November 5, 2016 at Santa Anita Park in Arcadia, California with a purse of $6,000,000.

California Chrome, who was the top-ranked Thoroughbred racehorse in the world, was the favorite for the race after an undefeated season. He led for most of the race but was caught near the finish line by Arrogate, a late developing three-year-old.

The Classic is run on dirt at one mile and one-quarter (approximately 2000 m). It is run under weight-for-age conditions, with entrants carrying the following weights:

- Northern Hemisphere three-year-olds: 122 lb
- Southern Hemisphere three-year-olds: 117 lb
- Four-year-olds and up: 126 lb
- Any fillies or mares receive a 3 lb allowance

== Contenders ==
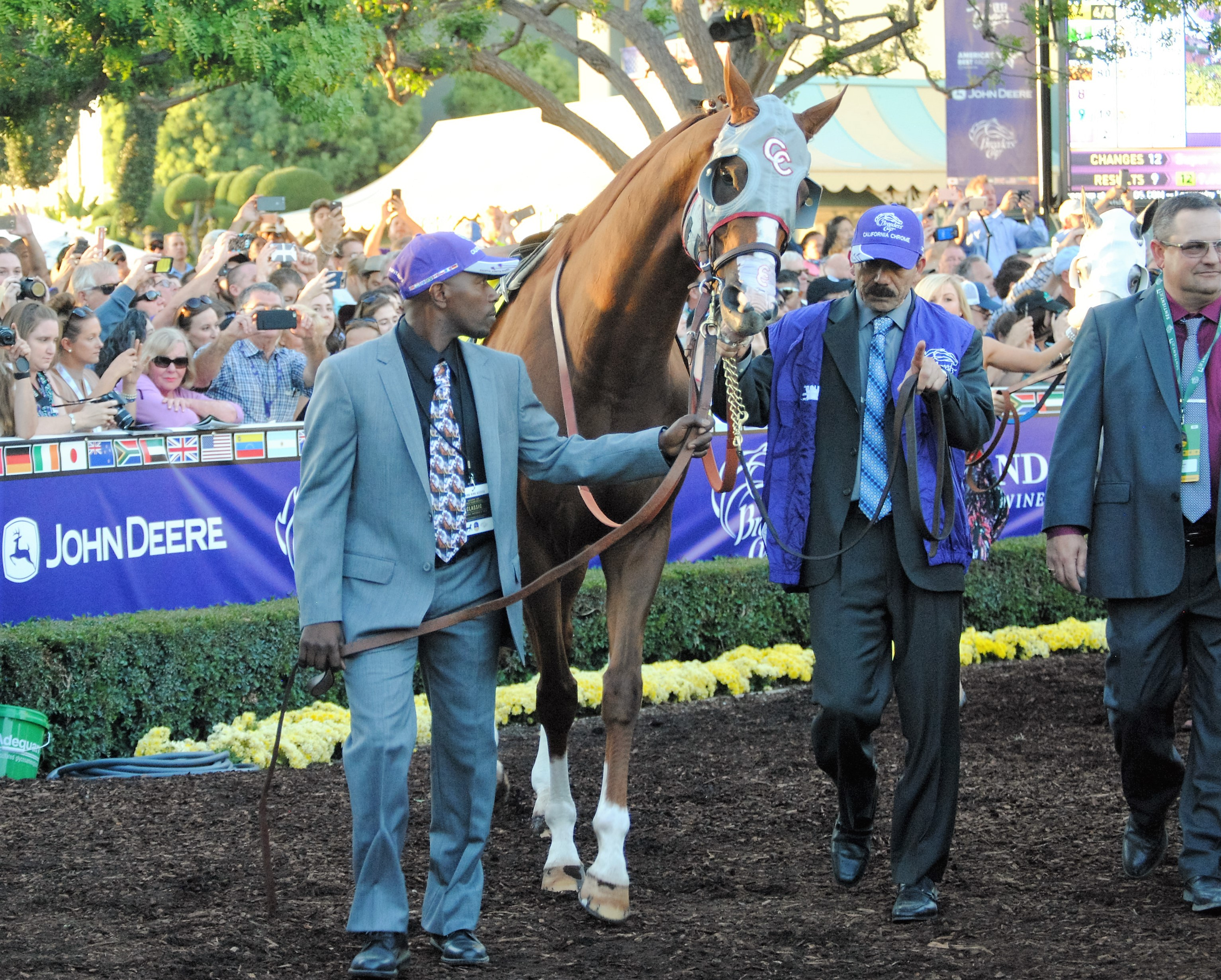
California Chrome before the Classic

California Chrome (program #4) was the even money favorite on the morning line for the Classic after a perfect season of six wins from six starts, including the Dubai World Cup, Pacific Classic and Awesome Again Stakes. He was ranked number one on the Longines World's Best Racehorse Rankings and held the North American earnings record. California Chrome was also the 2014 Horse of the Year after winning the Kentucky Derby and Preakness Stakes. His trainer Art Sherman said, "He's more mature, bigger, stronger, and you can see it in the way he's running. He's pretty well focused. He's kind of awesome to watch, to be honest with you."

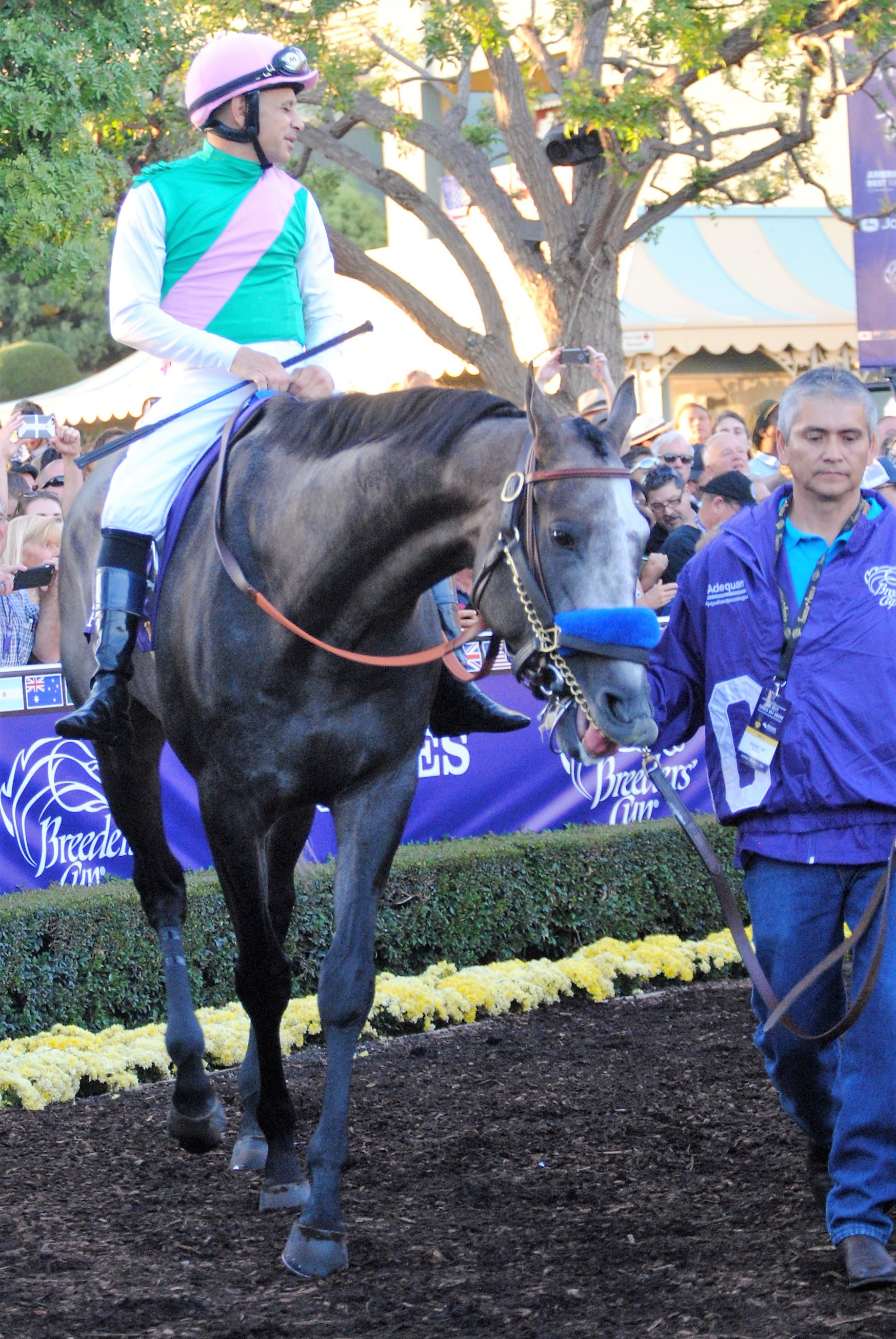
Arrogate before the Classic

Arrogate (p #10) was the second choice at 5-2 on the morning line, based on his record-setting win in the Travers Stakes in late August. The lightly raced three-year-old was trained by Bob Baffert, who won the Classic in 2014 with Bayern and in 2015 with American Pharoah. The Classic was only his second stakes race appearance.

Frosted (p #2) was the third choice at 3-1 on the morning line. Beaten by California Chrome in the Dubai World Cup, Frosted rebounded with noteworthy wins in the Metropolitan Handicap and Whitney before being upset in the Woodward.

The 9-horse field also included:

- Effinex, runner-up in the 2015 Classic to American Pharoah
- Keen Ice, winner of the 2015 Travers
- Win the Space, finished 3rd in the 2016 Awesome Again
- Melatonin, winner of the 2016 Santa Anita Handicap and Gold Cup at Santa Anita but unraced since June 25
- War Story, 2nd in the Pennsylvania Derby Champion Stakes
- Hoppertunity, winner of the Jockey Club Gold Cup

Shaman Ghost, winner of the Brooklyn and Woodward, scratched the day before the race.

== Race Description ==
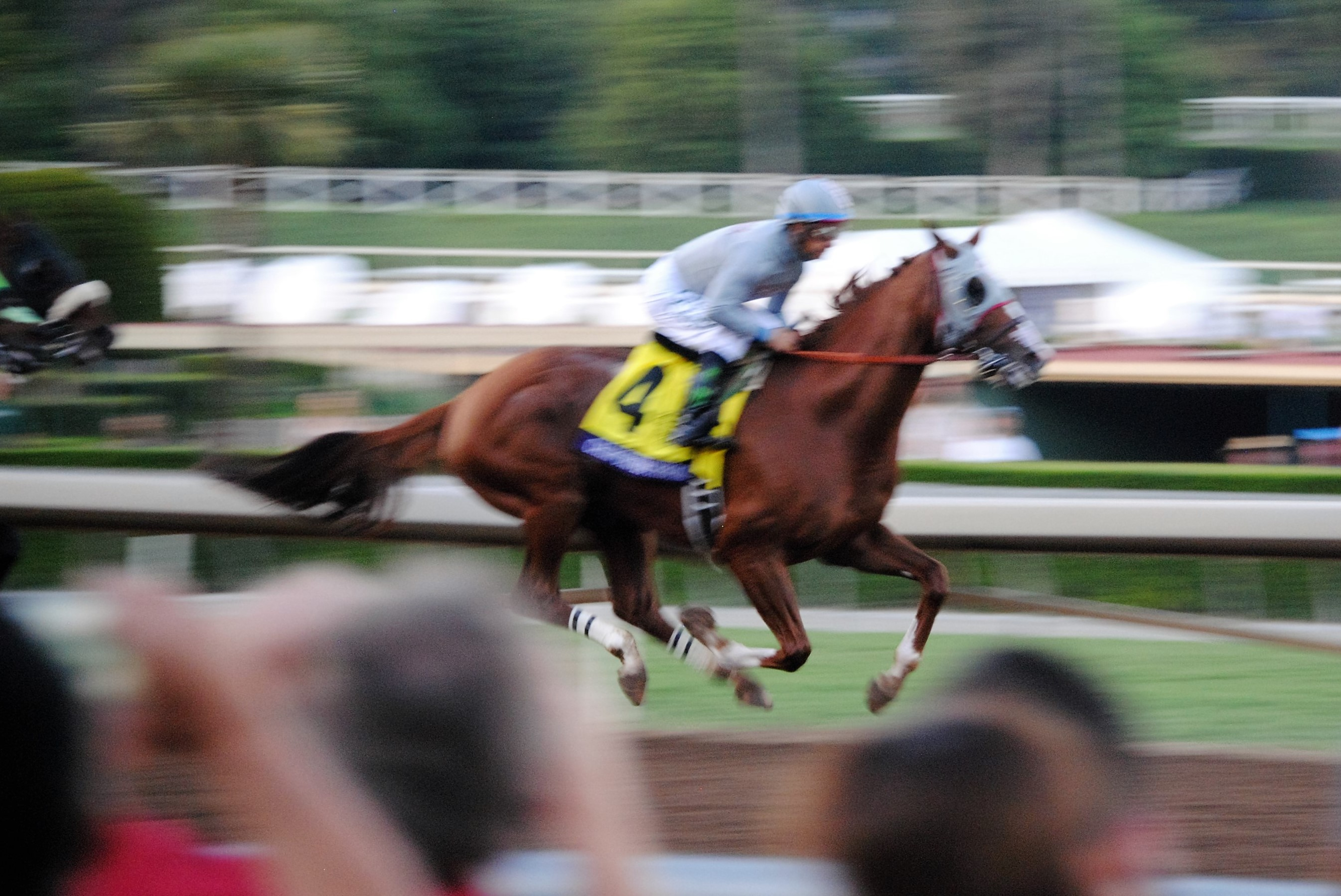
Shortly after the break, California Chrome takes command

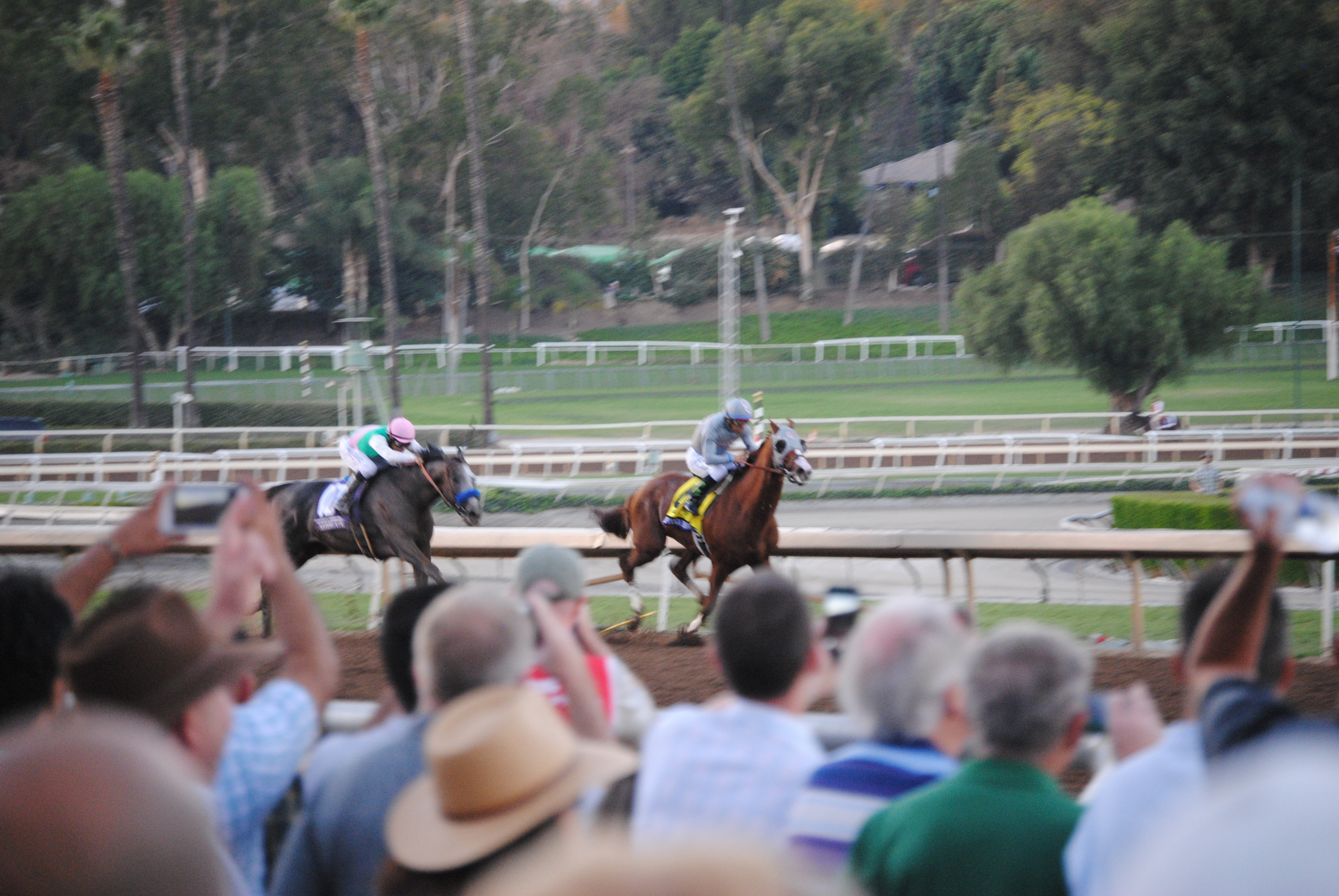
In the stretch, California Chrome leads by 1 1/2 lengths

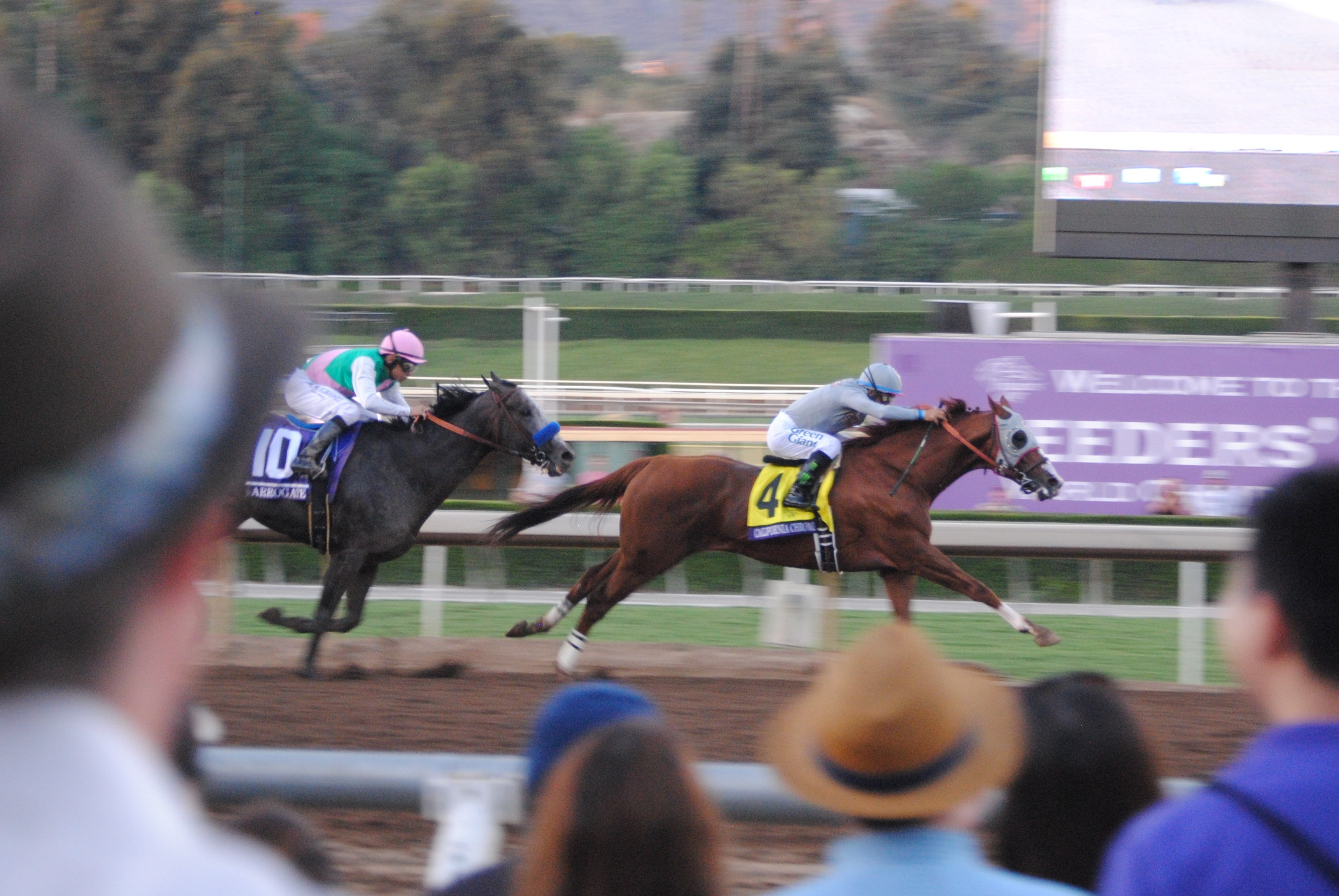
Arrogate starts cutting into the lead

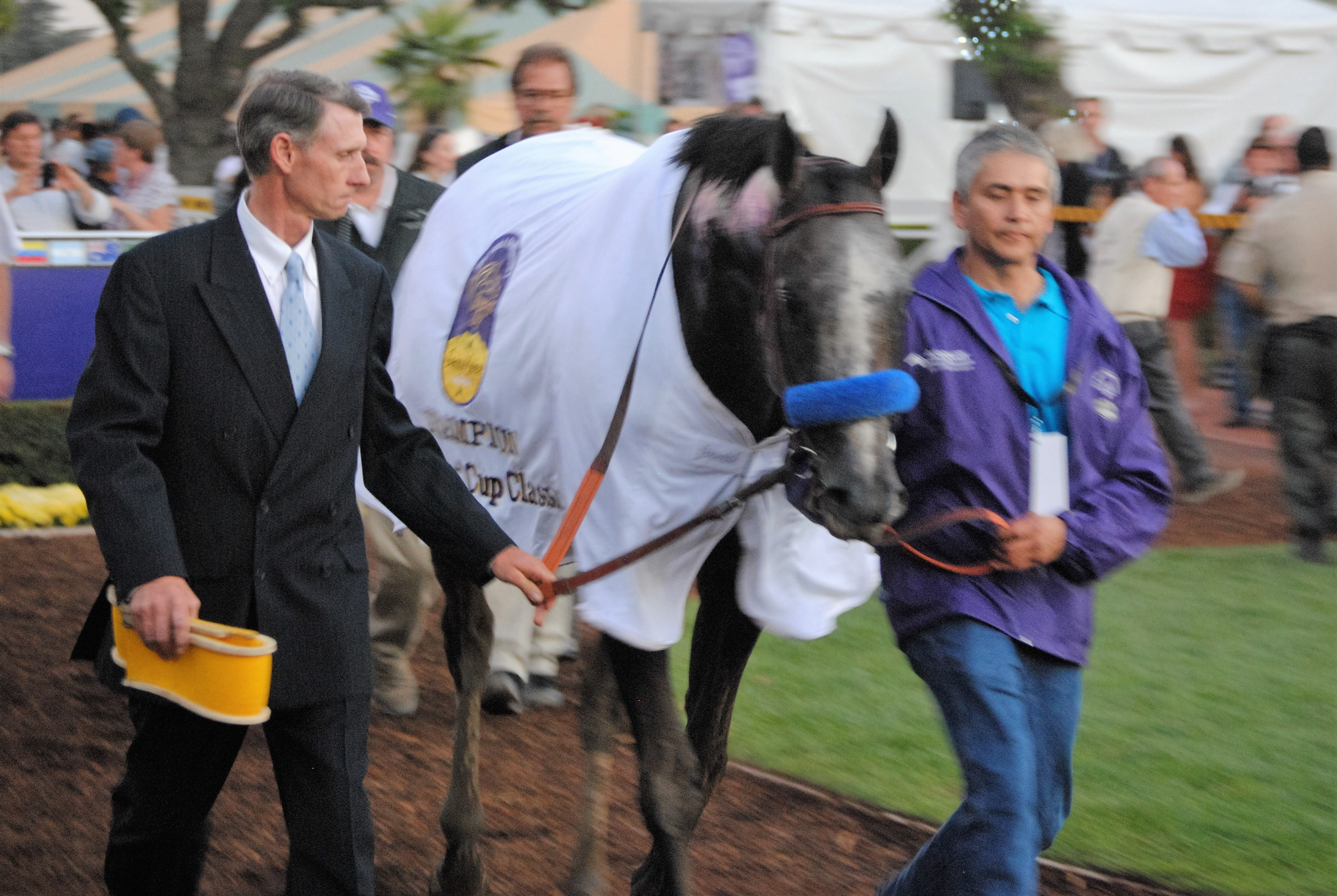
Arrogate being led back to the stable

California Chrome broke well and was urged by jockey Victor Espinoza to the early lead. Arrogate broke poorly from the outside post position but quickly moved to the middle of the pack, then up to third. With a quarter of a mile remaining, Arrogate moved into second, trailing California Chrome by a length and a half. Espinoza looked back at the field then set California Chrome down for the stretch drive. Arrogate was also urged on by his jockey Mike Smith and started to draw clear of the remaining horses, but did not initially make up any ground on the leader. Entering the last sixteenth of a mile, California Chrome still led by about a length but Arrogate had hit his best stride and was gaining. Arrogate finally assumed the lead in the final strides and won by half a length. The time of 2:00.11 was very good on a fast track that was playing slower than normal, earning Arrogate a Beyer Speed Figure of 120.

It was trainer Bob Baffert's third consecutive victory in the Classic, one he doubted Arrogate could pull off turning into the stretch. "I thought there was no way. California Chrome is a great horse. I didn't think we could run him down", he said. "I thought he'd get second. I'm thinking, 'At least he showed up.' But then I saw Mike getting down on him, and that big stride of his. That was an incredible race by two incredible horses."

"That winner is the real McCoy", said Art Sherman, trainer of California Chrome. "I knew he was the one we had to beat, but I didn't know how good he was."

== Results ==
Finish	Program Number	Margin (lengths)	Horse	Jockey	Trainer	Final Odds	Winnings
1st	10	1/2	Arrogate	Mike Smith	Bob Baffert	1.70	3,300,000
2nd	4	10 3/4	California Chrome	Victor Espinoza	Art Sherman	0.90	1,020,000
3rd	3	Neck	Keen Ice	Javier Castellano	Todd Pletcher	32.60	540,000
4th	9	4 1/4	Hoppertunity	John Velazquez	Bob Baffert	18.10	300,000
5th	6	3 1/2	Melatonin	Joe Talamo	David Hofmans	17.50	180,000
6th	2	4 3/4	Frosted	Joel Rosario	Kiaran McLaughlin	8.40	60,000
7th	1	1 1/4	Effinex	Flavien Prat	James Jerkens	34.70	60,000
8th	7		War Story	Scott Speith	Mario Serey Jr.	104.70	60,000
DNF	5		Win the Space	Gary Stevens	George Papaprodromou	74.30	

Source: Equibase

Times: 1/4 – 0:23.28; 1/2 – 0:47.15; 3/4 – 1:10.96; mile – 1:35.72; final – 2:00.11.
Fractional Splits: (:23.28) (:23.87) (:23.81) (:24.76) (:24.39)

== Payout ==
Payout Schedule:

Program Number	Horse	Win	Place	Show
10	Arrogate	5.40	2.80	2.60
4	California Chrome		2.60	2.40
3	Keen Ice			5.80

- $2 Exacta (10-4) Paid $10.00
- $2 Trifecta (10-4-3) Paid $149.20
- $2 Superfecta (10-4-3-9) Paid $592.60
