= Pegasus World Cup Invitational Stakes =

American Thoroughbred horse race

- Class: Grade I
- Location: Gulfstream Park; Hallandale Beach, Florida, United States
- Inaugurated: 2017
- Race type: Thoroughbred – Flat racing
- Website: www.pegasusworldcup.com

Race information
- Distance: 1 1/8 miles (9 furlongs)
- Surface: Dirt
- Track: left-handed
- Qualification: Four-year-olds and up
- Weight: 124 pounds (56 kg) with allowances
- Purse: $2 million (2027)

The Pegasus World Cup Invitational Stakes is an American Thoroughbred horse race whose first running was on January 28, 2017, at Gulfstream Park in Hallandale Beach, Florida. It is run over the dirt at the distance of 1 1/8 miles (9 furlongs) and is open to horses four years old and up. The Grade I rating was assumed from the Donn Handicap.

With a purse of $12 million for its inaugural running, the Pegasus World Cup surpassed the Dubai World Cup as the richest horse race in the world for the year 2017 & 2018. The purse of the event rose to $16 million in 2018, but dropped to $9 million in 2019. The purse was lowered to $3 million in 2020, and to $2 million for 2027. The entry fee structure has also changed over time, from $1 million in 2017 and 2018, to $500,000 in 2019 to free in 2020.

Horses carry 124 pounds (56 kg) with a three-pound allowance for fillies and mares. Between 2017 and 2019, horses that ran without the use of the pre-race medication furosemide (more commonly known as Lasix) received an allowance of five pounds. Starting in 2020, the use of all race-day medications, including Lasix, was prohibited, which the Stronach Group heralded as a "new era" in North American thoroughbred racing. Following this policy change, federal regulations introduced by the Horseracing Integrity and Safety Authority prohibit Lasix usage in all state racing jurisdictions (including Florida) within 48 hours of a stakes race.

The race is named for Pegasus, a Greek mythical horse, a 110-foot statue of which stands at Gulfstream Park. The Pegasus has been described as "Florida's Greatest Horse Race" by Maxim magazine.

== History ==
Frank Stronach first proposed the idea for the race during the Thoroughbred Owners Conference at Gulfstream in January 2016. His original proposal called for an annual 1 1/4-mile (10 furlong) race to be run at either Gulfstream or Santa Anita Park in mid to late January, which would not interfere with the Breeders' Cup or the Dubai World Cup. The timing also makes it possible for a horse to run one last race before retiring to stud, as the North American breeding season begins in mid-February. "I think racing usually has a little lull this time of year – we have to wait for spring for something to happen", said trainer Bob Baffert in January 2017. "When I heard about the idea last year, I thought wow, American Pharoah probably would have been in there for one more try at it."

The Stronach Group officially announced plans for the race in May 2016, with the distance shortened to 1 1/8 miles (9 furlongs). Under the original format, 12 shareholders each paid $1 million to purchase a position in the gate for a then unspecified horse. The shareholder then had the right to race, lease, contract or share a starter, or sell their place in the gate, and had the first right of refusal for subsequent races. Shareholders also had an equal share in the net income from the race. Each shareholder was permitted to pre-enter two horses. A pre-entered horse that did not draw into the Pegasus World Cup was eligible to compete in the newly created Poseidon Stakes, which was run under similar conditions but offered a $400,000 purse and required a $20,000 entry fee.

The second Pegasus World Cup in 2018 was contested for a higher purse of $16 million, with $1 million from each of the 12 starting positions and an additional $4 million contributed by the Stronach Group.

With the addition of a race on turf, the total prize money for the 2019 event was increased to $17 million. The purse for the original dirt race was reduced to $9 million, with the other $7 million in purse money was allocated to the new Pegasus World Cup Turf race (formerly the Gulfstream Park Turf Handicap), and another $1 million available as bonus money if an owner won both races. The entry fee was reduced to $500,000, with 24 entries available — 12 in each of the dirt and turf races.

The fourth Pegasus World Cup in 2020 carried a purse of $3 million and required that horses be free of all race-day medications. There were no longer entry or starting fees, as was the case with the previous runnings, and two percent of all purse winnings would be donated to thoroughbred aftercare.

In November 2026, it was announced that the purse of the Pegasus World Cup would be reduced to $2 million for its 2027 running.

== Records ==
Speed Record

- 1:46.83 – Arrogate (2017)

Most wins by a Jockey

- 3 – Irad Ortiz Jr. (2020, 2022, 2025)

Most wins by a trainer

- 3 – Bob Baffert (2017, 2020, 2024)

Most wins by an owner

- 2 – Faisal bin Khalid bin Abdulaziz Al Saud (2020, 2025)

== Winners ==
Year	Winner	Jockey	Trainer	Owner	Distance	Time	Purse	Ref
2026	Skippylongstocking	Tyler Gaffalione	Saffie A. Joseph Jr.	Daniel Alonso	1 1/8 miles	1:48.49	$2,903,800	
2025	White Abarrio	Irad Ortiz Jr.	Saffie A. Joseph Jr.	C2 Racing, Faisal bin Khalid bin Abdulaziz Al Saud, & Antonio Pagnano	1 1/8 miles	1:48.05	$2,925,400	
2024	National Treasure	Flavien Prat	Bob Baffert	SF Racing, Starlight Racing, Madaket Stables, Robert E. Masterson, Stonestreet Stables, Jay A. Schoenfarber, Waves Edge Capital & Catherine Donovan	1 1/8 miles	1:50.51	$2,932,700	
2023	Art Collector	Junior Alvarado	William I. Mott	Bruce Lunsford	1 1/8 miles	1:49.44	$2,944,000	
2022	Life Is Good	Irad Ortiz Jr.	Todd A. Pletcher	WinStar Farm & China Horse Club	1 1/8 miles	1:48.91	$3,000,000	
2021	Knicks Go	Joel Rosario	Brad H. Cox	Korea Racing Authority	1 1/8 miles	1:47.89	$3,000,000	
2020	Mucho Gusto	Irad Ortiz Jr.	Bob Baffert	Faisal bin Khalid bin Abdulaziz Al Saud	1 1/8 miles	1:48.85	$3,000,000	
2019	City of Light	Javier Castellano	Michael W. McCarthy	William K. Warren Jr. & Suzanne Warren	1 1/8 miles	1:47.71	$9,000,000	
2018	Gun Runner	Florent Geroux	Steven M. Asmussen	Winchell Thoroughbreds & Three Chimneys Farm	1 1/8 miles	1:47.41	$16,000,000	
2017	Arrogate	Mike E. Smith	Bob Baffert	Juddmonte Farms	1 1/8 miles	1:46.83	$12,000,000	
