= Seize the Grey =

Thoroughbred race horse

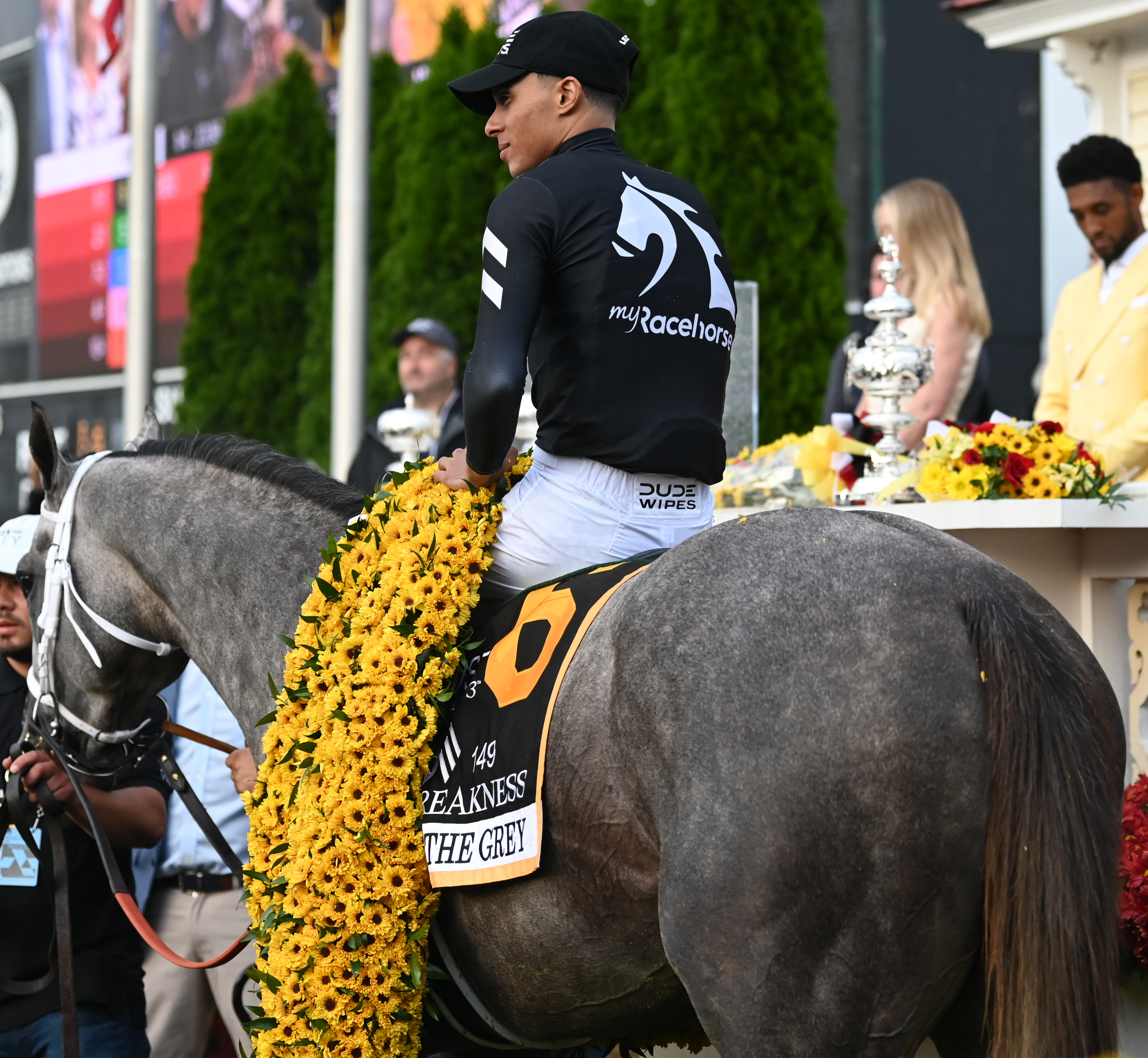
- Seize the Grey at Preakness Stakes
- Sire: Arrogate
- Grandsire: Unbridled's Song
- Dam: Smart Shopping
- Damsire: Smart Strike
- Sex: Stallion
- Foaled: April 20, 2021 (age 5); Kentucky, U.S.
- Country: United States
- Color: Gray
- Breeder: Jamm, LTD
- Owner: MyRacehorse
- Trainer: D. Wayne Lukas
- Record: 14: 5 – 0 – 3
- Earnings: US$2,425,938

Major wins
- Pat Day Mile Stakes (2024); Pennsylvania Derby (2024); American Triple Crown wins: Preakness Stakes (2024)
- Last updated on December 28, 2024

Seize the Grey (foaled April 20, 2021) is a multiple Grade I American thoroughbred racehorse who won the 2024 Preakness Stakes, the second leg of the American Triple Crown.

== Background ==
The sire (father) of Seize the Grey, a gray stallion is the champion horse Arrogate; he was bred by the late Audrey Otto as Jamm Ltd. His dam (mother) is Smart Shopping whose sire was the Canadian Hall of Famer Smart Strike. Seize the Grey was bought for $300,000 from the Mill Ridge Sales consignment at The Saratoga Sale, Fasig Tipton's select yearling sale in 2022.

Seize the Grey is owned by the MyRacehorse microsyndicate founded by Michael Behrens. The syndicate has 2,570 different owners who bought up 5,000 shares of the colt at US$127 a share. His name was submitted in a contest administered by MyRacehorse and chosen by his shareholders.

Seize the Grey was trained by U.S. Racing Hall of Famer D. Wayne Lukas.

Seize the Grey was retired to stud on November 7, 2024. He is standing at Gainesway Farm in Lexington, KY.

== Career ==
On September 21, 2024, Seize the Grey, steered by Jaime Torres, won the $1 million Pennsylvania Derby by 3 3/4 lengths in a distance of 1 1/8 miles in 1:51.89 at Parx Racing. Seize the Grey started at odds of 4-1 as the third choice in the field of 11 3-year-olds.

== Statistics ==
Date	Distance	Race	Grade	Track	Odds	Field	Finish	Winning Time	Winning (Losing) Margin	Jockey	Ref
2023 – Two-year-old season
Jul 1, 2023	6 furlongs	Maiden Special Weight		Ellis Park	4.87	9	8	1:10.97	(17 1/4 lengths)	Luis Saez	
Jul 29, 2023	6 1/2 furlongs	Maiden Special Weight		Saratoga	16.40	10	1	1:17.95	1 3/4 lengths	Jamie Torres	
Aug 18, 2023	5 1/2 furlongs	Skidmore Stakes		Saratoga	1.85*	9	3	1:05.30	(2 3/4 lengths)	Joel Rosario	
Sep 16, 2023	1 mile	Iroquois Stakes	III	Churchill Downs	4.96	8	4	1:37.28	(2 1/4 lengths)	Jamie Torres	
Oct 14, 2023	1 1/16 miles	Allowance		Keeneland	2.66	7	3	1:46.34	(10 1/2 lengths)	Jamie Torres	
2024 – Three-year-old season
Feb 24, 2024	1 1/16 miles	Allowance		Oaklawn Park	5.80	7	1	1:44.75	1 length	Nik Juarez	
Mar 23, 2024	1 1/8 miles	Jeff Ruby Steaks	III	Turfway Park	6.60	10	3	1:50.15	(4 lengths)	Nik Juarez	
Apr 6, 2024	1 1/8 miles	Blue Grass Stakes	I	Keeneland	19.90	10	7	1:50.08	(10 3/4 lengths)	Nik Juarez	
May 4, 2024	1 mile	Pat Day Mile Stakes	II	Churchill Downs	9.42	12	1	1:35.96	1 1/4 lengths	Jamie Torres	
May 18, 2024	1 3/16 miles	Preakness Stakes	I	Pimlico	9.80	8	1	1:56.82	2 1/4 lengths	Jamie Torres	
Jun 8, 2024	1 1/4 miles	Belmont Stakes	I	Saratoga	5.30	10	7	2:01.64	(12 3/4 lengths)	Jamie Torres	
Jul 27, 2024	1 1/8 miles	Jim Dandy Stakes	II	Saratoga	6.20	6	4	1:49.15	(12 lengths)	Jamie Torres	
Sep 21, 2024	1 1/8 miles	Pennsylvania Derby	I	Parx Racing	4.30	11	1	1:51.89	3 3/4 lengths	Jamie Torres	
Nov 2, 2024	1 mile	Breeders' Cup Dirt Mile	I	Del Mar	5.60	13	8	1:35.48	(7 1/2 lengths)	Jamie Torres	

Notes:
An (*) asterisk after the odds means Seize the Grey was the post-time favorite.

== Pedigree ==
Pedigree of Seize the Grey (USA), gray colt, April 20, 2021
Sire Arrogate (2013)	Unbridled's Song (1993)	Unbridled (1987)	Fappiano* (1977)
Sire Arrogate (2013)	Unbridled's Song (1993)	Unbridled (1987)	Gana Facil (1981)
Sire Arrogate (2013)	Unbridled's Song (1993)	Trolley Song (1983)	Caro (IRE) (1967)
Sire Arrogate (2013)	Unbridled's Song (1993)	Trolley Song (1983)	Lucky Spell (1971)
Sire Arrogate (2013)	Bubbler (2006)	Distorted Humor (1993)	Forty Niner* (1985)
Sire Arrogate (2013)	Bubbler (2006)	Distorted Humor (1993)	Danzig's Beauty (1979)
Sire Arrogate (2013)	Bubbler (2006)	Grechelle (1995)	Deputy Minister (CAN) (1979)
Sire Arrogate (2013)	Bubbler (2006)	Grechelle (1995)	Meadow Star (1988)
Dam Smart Shopping (2013)	Smart Strike (CAN) (1992)	Mr. Prospector* (1970)	Raise a Native (1961)
Dam Smart Shopping (2013)	Smart Strike (CAN) (1992)	Mr. Prospector* (1970)	Gold Digger (1962)
Dam Smart Shopping (2013)	Smart Strike (CAN) (1992)	Classy 'n Smart (CAN) (1981)	Smarten (1976)
Dam Smart Shopping (2013)	Smart Strike (CAN) (1992)	Classy 'n Smart (CAN) (1981)	No Class (CAN) (1976)
Dam Smart Shopping (2013)	Shop Again (2002)	Wild Again (1980)	Icecapade (1969)
Dam Smart Shopping (2013)	Shop Again (2002)	Wild Again (1980)	Bushel-n-Peck (1958)
Dam Smart Shopping (2013)	Shop Again (2002)	Shopping (1988)	Private Account (1976)
Dam Smart Shopping (2013)	Shop Again (2002)	Shopping (1988)	Impish (1972) (Family 8-h)

- Seize the Grey is inbred 5S x 5S x 3D to the stallion Mr. Prospector, meaning he appears in the fifth generation twice (via Fappiano and Forty Niner) on the sire side and in the third generation on dam side of his pedigree.
