= 2024 Preakness Stakes =

149th running of the Preakness Stakes

149th Preakness Stakes
- Preakness Stakes
- Grade I stakes race
- Location: Pimlico Race Course; Baltimore, Maryland, U.S.
- Date: May 18, 2024
- Distance: 1 3/16 mi (9.5 furlongs; 1.9 km)
- Winning horse: Seize the Grey
- Winning time: 1:56.82
- Final odds: 9.80
- Jockey: Jaime Torres
- Trainer: D. Wayne Lukas
- Owner: MyRacehorse
- Conditions: Muddy (sealed)
- Surface: Dirt
- Attendance: 46,999

The 2024 Preakness Stakes was the 149th Preakness Stakes, a Grade I stakes race for three-year-old Thoroughbreds at a distance of 1 3/16 miles (9 1/2 furlongs; 1,911 meters). The race is one leg of the American Triple Crown and is held annually at Pimlico Race Course in Baltimore, Maryland. The Preakness Stakes is traditionally held on the third Saturday in May, two weeks after the Kentucky Derby. The 2024 edition was scheduled for May 18, Race 13, with a post time of 7:01 p.m. EDT and television coverage by NBC and Peacock from 4:30 to 7:30 p.m. ET. The purse for the 2024 stakes was valued at $2 million. The race was won by Seize the Grey.

== Entries ==
A field of 9 was drawn on May 13. Muth drew post 4 as the 8-5 morning line favorite. Mystik Dan drew post 5 as the 5-2 second choice, for an expected wet running of the Preakness. Two days after the draw, Pimlico officials announced that Muth had developed a 103 °F (39 °C) fever and would scratch from the race.

== Result ==
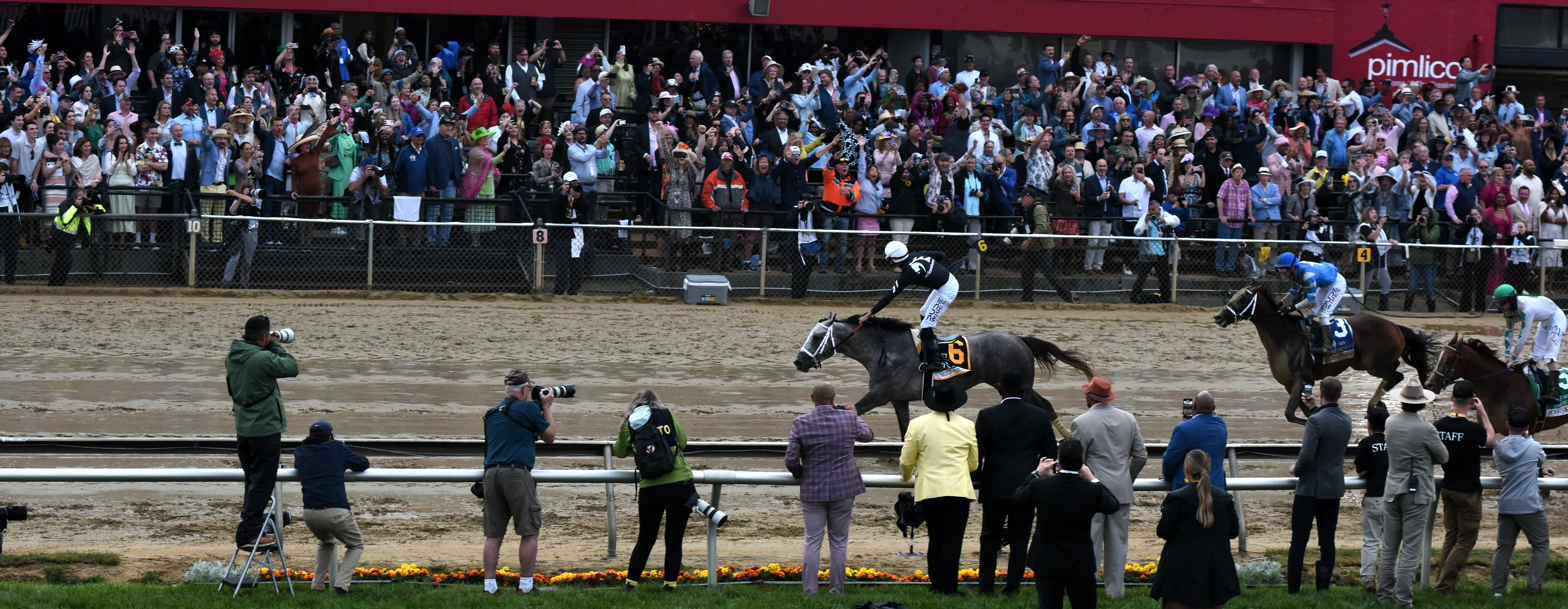
Seize the Grey crosses the finish line, followed by Mystik Dan and Catching Freedom

With rain falling throughout the day, the track was declared as muddy for the race, the first time since 1939 that the race was run in such conditions. Seize the Grey won the race after leading wire-to-wire, finishing 2 1/4 lengths ahead of Mystik Dan. Seize the Grey's victory was considered an upset victory, with the horse having the third-worst odds at post-time of the nine starters. The victory was the seventh Preakness victory for trainer D. Wayne Lukas.

Finish	Program Number	Horse	Jockey	Trainer	Morning Line Odds	Final Odds	Margin (Lengths)	Winnings
1	6	Seize the Grey	Jaime Torres	D. Wayne Lukas	15-1	9.80		$1,200,000
2	5	Mystik Dan	Brian Hernandez Jr.	Kenneth G. McPeek	5-2	2.40	2 1/4	$400,000
3	3	Catching Freedom	Flavien Prat	Brad H. Cox	6-1	3.70	2 1/4	$220,000
4	8	Tuscan Gold	Tyler Gaffalione	Chad C. Brown	8-1	4.40	8 1/4	$120,000
5	7	Just Steel	Joel Rosario	D. Wayne Lukas	15-1	10.40	10 1/2	$60,000
6	2	Uncle Heavy	Irad Ortiz Jr.	Robert E. Reid Jr.	20-1	7.80	13	
7	9	Imagination	Frankie Dettori	Bob Baffert	6-1	4.20	15 1/2	
8	1	Mugatu	Joe Bravo	Jeff Engler	20-1	17.80	40 1/2	
SCR	4	Muth	Juan J. Hernandez	Bob Baffert				

Track condition: Muddy (sealed)

Times: 1/4 mile – 23.98; 1/2 mile – 47.33; 3/4 mile – 1:11.95; mile – 1:37.53; final – 1:56.82.
Splits for each quarter-mile: (23.98) (23.35) (24.62) (25.58) (19.29)

== Payout ==
Pgm	Horse	Win	Place	Show
1	Seize the Grey	$21.60	$8.40	$4.40
7	Mystik Dan	–	$4.20	$2.80
3	Catching Freedom	–	–	$3.20

- $1 Exacta (6-5) $59.70
- $1 Trifecta: (6-5-3) $183.70
- $1 Superfecta: (6-5-3-8) $749.00
- $1 Super High Five (6-5-3-8-7) $2,986.80

Preceded by 2024 Kentucky Derby	Triple Crown	Succeeded by 2024 Belmont Stakes
