= Gun Runner (horse) =

American Thoroughbred racehorse

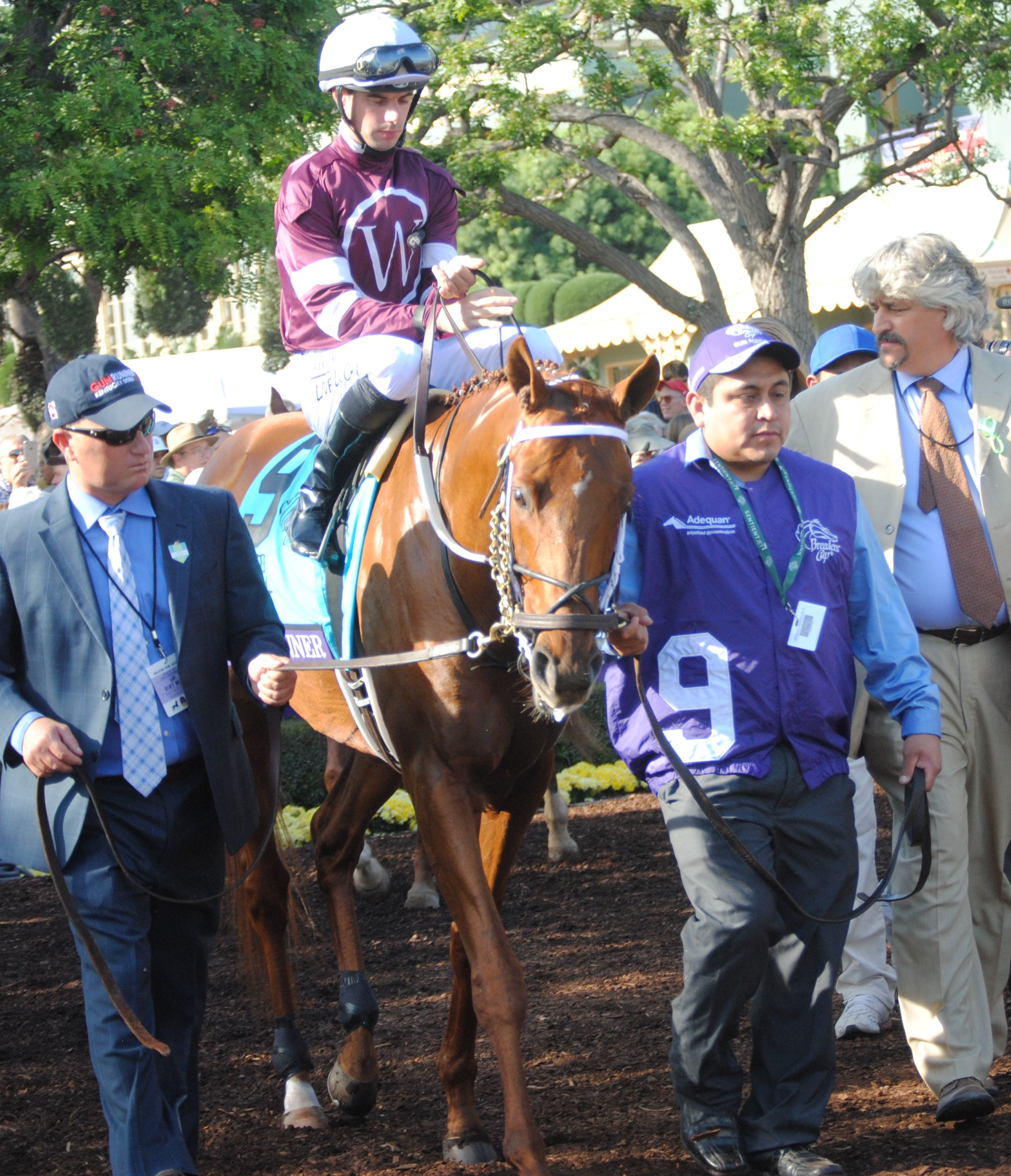
- Gun Runner at the 2016 Breeders' Cup
- Sire: Candy Ride
- Grandsire: Ride The Rails
- Dam: Quiet Giant
- Damsire: Giant’s Causeway
- Sex: Stallion
- Foaled: March 8, 2013 (age 13)
- Country: United States
- Color: Chestnut
- Breeder: Besilu Stables LLC
- Owner: Winchell Thoroughbreds LLC and Three Chimneys Farm
- Trainer: Steve Asmussen
- Record: 19: 12–3–2
- Earnings: US$15,988,500

Major wins
- Risen Star Stakes (2016); Louisiana Derby (2016); Matt Winn Stakes (2016); Clark Handicap (2016); Razorback Handicap (2017); Stephen Foster Handicap (2017); Whitney Handicap (2017); Woodward Stakes (2017); Pegasus World Cup (2018); Breeders' Cup wins: Breeders' Cup Classic (2017)

Awards
- American Horse of the Year (2017); American Champion Older Dirt Male Horse (2017); Timeform US rating: 142

Honors
- National Museum of Racing and Hall of Fame (2024)

Gun Runner (foaled March 8, 2013) is a US Hall of Fame Thoroughbred racehorse who was the 2017 American Horse of the Year after winning four Grade I races at age four. He retired with earnings of nearly $16 million.

As a three-year-old, he became one of the early favorites for the 2016 Kentucky Derby after winning both the Risen Star Stakes and Louisiana Derby. Following a third-place finish in the Kentucky Derby, he won the Matt Winn Stakes and Clark Handicap, and was second in the Breeders' Cup Dirt Mile and Pennsylvania Derby.

As a four-year-old in 2017, he finished second in the Dubai World Cup, then went on to win the Stephen Foster Handicap, Whitney Stakes, Woodward Stakes, and Breeders' Cup Classic. His performance in the Whitney earned him a rating of 127 in the August 2017 update of the World's Best Racehorse Rankings, ranking him in third place worldwide. Prior to retiring to stud as a five-year-old, he also won the 2018 Pegasus World Cup.

== Background ==
Gun Runner is a chestnut stallion with a small white star and one white sock bred in Kentucky by Benjamin Leon Jr.'s Besilu Stables. His sire is Candy Ride, an Argentinian-bred horse who was undefeated in a six race career that included four Grade I wins in Argentina and the United States. Although expectations for Candy Ride at stud were initially low, he proved himself a successful sire whose offspring include champion Shared Belief. Candy Ride was among the top five sires in North America four times, including a second-place finish in 2017.

Gun Runner is the first foal out of Quiet Giant, a multiple stakes winner from a distinguished female family that traces to Hall of Fame inductee Gallorette. Quiet Giant is by three-time leading sire in North America Giant's Causeway out of the broodmare Quiet Dance, the dam of Horse of the Year Saint Liam and Grade 1 winner Funtastic. Quiet Giant was owned by Edward P. "Ned" Evans during the early part of her racing career. Following Evans' death in 2010, she finished her racing career under the ownership of his estate and was bought by Besilu Stables as a broodmare prospect at the Keeneland November sale in 2011 for $3 million. Quiet Giant was officially retired from racing and was bred to Candy Ride in 2012, resulting in the birth of Gun Runner at WinStar Farm on March 8, 2013. "He was bright and inquisitive as a young horse, never much trouble and never sick or injured", according to Chris Baker, who was then the general manager of WinStar Farm. Donnie Preston, another WinStar employee, noted that the young Gun Runner had "a little bit of fire to him."

Gun Runner was purchased in 2014 by Three Chimneys Farm as part of a package deal where Three Chimneys bought majority interests in Besilu's breeding stock, weanlings and yearlings. Three Chimneys originally planned to re-sell Gun Runner at auction as a two-year-old but instead sold a half interest in the colt to Ron Winchell for an undisclosed price upon recommendation by his bloodstock advisor Dr. David Lambert and Equine Analysis Systems.

Physically, Gun Runner is slightly taller than average, standing just under 16.2 hands high. Chris Baker, the chief operating officer of Three Chimneys, summarized Gun Runner's main assets: "Pedigree. Conformation. Athleticism. Just the way he always carried himself, just very smart, intelligent, classy. Easy-moving horse, kind of scopey and light, but in a good way — just an athlete... We've got a stallion barn that we want to fill. He was the kind that had enough of the attributes on paper, that if he did what we thought he could do, he'd be in our stallion barn. And he hasn't proven us wrong yet."

== Racing history ==
=== 2015: two-year-old season ===
Gun Runner won two of three starts at age two. On September 11, 2015, he made his career debut at Churchill Downs, winning a maiden special weight race over one mile by three-quarters of a length. He followed up with a win in an allowance race at Keeneland on October 17. He made his graded stakes race debut on November 28 in the Kentucky Jockey Club Stakes at Churchill Downs. On a muddy track, Gun Runner overcame some traffic problems to take the lead at the head of the stretch but was then overtaken and finished fourth.

=== 2016: three-year-old season ===
Gun Runner won four of nine starts at age three, also finishing second twice and third twice. He was part of a competitive three-year-old crop that included Kentucky Derby winner Nyquist, Preakness winner Exaggerator, and the late-developing Arrogate, winner of the Travers and Breeders’ Cup Classic.

Gun Runner began his three-year-old campaign on February 20, 2016, in the Grade II Risen Star Stakes at the Fair Grounds Race Course. With new jockey Florent Geroux, he settled in fourth, then started his move around the final turn. He hit the lead at the head of the stretch, then held off a late run from Forevamo to win by half a length. "He's a very nice horse. We're very lucky to have him," said trainer Steve Asmussen. "I thought Florent gave him a beautiful trip with how the track was playing. He's shown talent the whole time and it's definitely good to see him in the winner's circle in a race like this."

On March 26, Gun Runner returned in the $1 million Louisiana Derby, also at the Fair Grounds, where he was the third betting choice at odds of just under 4–1. He was close behind a slow early pace, then drew away in the stretch to win by 4 1/2 lengths. "The good thing is he's very easy to manage,” said Geroux. "He has so many gears. He settles really nicely, and when you ask him to go, he has a nice turn of foot."

Gun Runner earned 151 points and ranked first on the 2016 Road to the Kentucky Derby, a series of races through which horses qualified for the 2016 Kentucky Derby. In the Derby, he was the third betting choice behind the two-year-old champion Nyquist, who had also won the Florida Derby, and Exaggerator, who had won the Santa Anita Derby. Gun Runner broke well and raced with Nyquist just behind a fast early pace set by Dazzling Candy. As they rounded into the stretch, Gun Runner took the lead. Nyquist then responded and started to draw away. From far behind, Exaggerator made a strong run down the stretch to finish second, with Gun Runner holding on for third.

With his connections opting to pass the final two legs of the Triple Crown, Gun Runner returned to action on June 18 in the Matt Winn Stakes at Churchill Downs. He led from wire to wire, winning by 5 1/4 lengths while setting a stakes record. His time of 1:41.12 for 1 1/16 miles was 0.02 seconds off the track record.

His next start saw him face Nyquist and Exaggerator again in the 2016 Haskell Invitational Stakes. On a sloppy track, he ran an uncharacteristically off-the-board race, finishing fifth. He rebounded with a third-place finish in the Travers Stakes, though well behind the winner, Arrogate, who set a track record for 10 furlongs with a final time of 1:59.36. "We ran into a freak today," Asmussen said. "I thought 2:02 would win it."

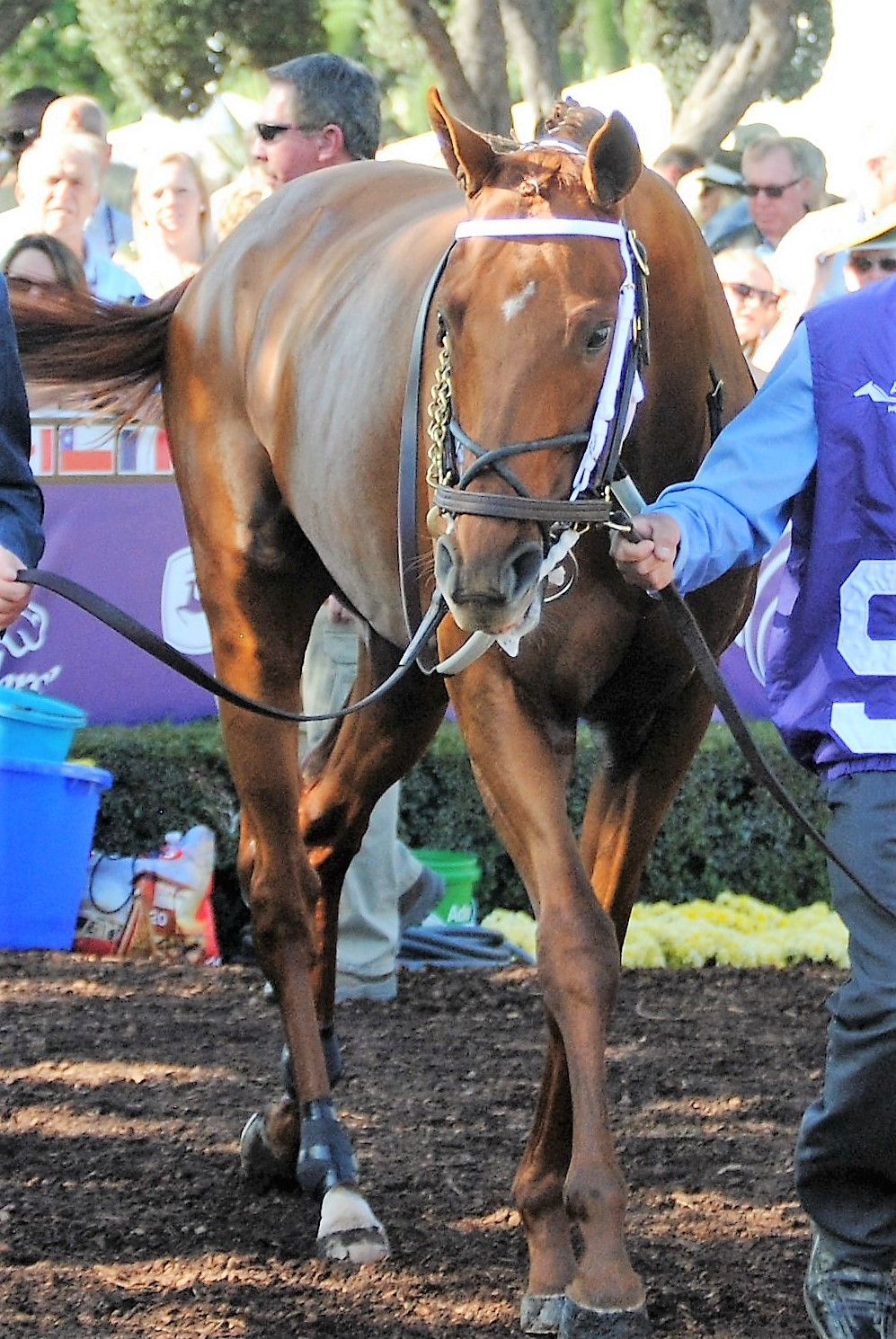
Gun Runner before the 2016 Breeders' Cup

On September 24, Gun Runner again faced off with Nyquist and Exaggerator in the $1.25 million Pennsylvania Derby at Parx Racing. He settled into fourth behind a fast early pace, then swung wide around the far turn to move into second. Meanwhile, Connect made his move along the rail and reached the lead in mid-stretch, then stood off Gun Runner's rally to win by half a length.

After finishing second in the Breeders' Cup Dirt Mile, Gun Runner ended his three-year-old season on November 25 against a strong field of older horses in the Clark Handicap at Churchill Downs. When expected pacemaker Noble Bird broke poorly, Gun Runner took control of the race and led from wire to wire for the first Grade I win of his career. "I'm so proud of him," said Asmussen. "Walking him over, the horse has such confidence about him. He's kept his strength and his weight with the thousands of miles he's traveled this year on the stages that he's been on."

=== 2017: four-year-old season ===
Gun Runner won five of six races at age four. His only loss was a second-place finish behind Arrogate in the Dubai World Cup. He turned the tables on Arrogate in the 2017 Breeders' Cup Classic, which helped him earn Horse of the Year honors.

==== Winter and Spring ====
Gun Runner was stabled over the winter at the Fair Grounds, which was quarantined in January after two horses tested positive for the neuropathogenic strain of the equine herpesvirus. The connections of Gun Runner arranged to enter the horse in the inaugural running of the $12 million Pegasus World Cup on January 28 in what would have been his seasonal debut, but Gulfstream Park officials refused to allow him to travel to the track despite a negative blood test for the virus, as the horse had not been tested using a nasal swab.

Instead, Gun Runner's 2017 seasonal debut came in the Grade III Razorback Handicap on February 20 at Oaklawn Park. Sent off as the 1–5 favorite in a field of six older horses, Gun Runner took the lead out of the gate and was never seriously challenged to win as he went 1 1/16 miles in 1:40.97, two-fifths of a second off the stakes record of 1:40 2/5. The win cemented Gun Runner's reputation for durability, reliability, and "consistent class" and encouraged his connections to run him in the $10 million Dubai World Cup. "He's getting better and better and (the Razorback) was an extremely pleasant performance, even better than anticipated,” said Doug Cauthen of Three Chimneys Farm. "He's a heck of a nice horse and he's proven it."

On March 25, Gun Runner entered the Dubai World Cup at Meydan Racecourse in Dubai as part of a field of fourteen that was headlined by Arrogate, who had won the Breeders' Cup Classic and Pegasus World Cup after defeating Gun Runner in the Travers. On a muddy track, Gun Runner tracked the early leaders, then took the lead as the field turned for home. He continued to stride out well but succumbed to Arrogate, who overcame a terrible start to win. Gun Runner's second-place finish earned him $2 million. After the Dubai World Cup, his connections announced that Gun Runner would run against Arrogate at least once more, in the 2017 Breeders' Cup Classic.

==== Summer ====
On May 1, it was announced that Gun Runner's next start would be in the Grade 1 Stephen Foster Handicap at Churchill Downs on June 17. The Stephen Foster is a "Win and You're In" race, part of the Breeders' Cup Challenge series. The winner of each "Win and You're In" race gets an automatic berth into a specific Breeders' Cup race, which for the Stephen Foster is the Breeders' Cup Classic. Highweighted at 124 pounds, Gun Runner drew post 3 in the Stephen Foster and was installed as the 4–5 morning line favorite. By post time, his odds had dropped to 1–2. Sent out to the lead early, Gun Runner set the pace and led the field into the first turn and onto the backstretch. On the second turn, 10–1 shot Stanford attempted to make a bid for the lead, but Gun Runner drew away to win by 7 lengths, a record margin of victory for the Stephen Foster. His final time of 1:47.56 was 0.28 seconds off of Victory Gallop's track record set in the 1999 Stephen Foster. He was given a Timeform US rating of 139 for his performance, tied with Arrogate in the Pegasus World Cup for the highest Timeform rating achieved within the US in 2017 until that point.

Asmussen was relieved that Gun Runner had earned his spot in the Breeders' Cup Classic early. "There's not more I can say than this horse is simply the real deal,” he said following Gun Runner's Stephen Foster win. Jockey Florent Geroux was also very impressed with Gun Runner's performance. "You know, going back and thinking about the race, it's very rare as a jockey that you can feel a horse never getting tired in a 1 1/8-mile Grade 1,” he remarked.

Gun Runner made his next start in the Whitney Stakes on August 5 at Saratoga, going off as the heavy 3–5 favorite. After a good start, he settled into second place behind Cautious Giant, who had been entered as a "rabbit" for his stablemate War Story. Entering the far turn, Geroux decided the pace was too slow and let Gun Runner assume control of the race. In the stretch, he continued to draw away to a 5 1/4 length victory, despite a strong late run from Keen Ice.

The win attracted further attention on social media because Gun Runner ran the final half mile with a horseshoe caught in his tail; a shoe from Cautious Giant flew loose just as Gun Runner was starting his move. "We watched the tape repeatedly, repeatedly,” said Asmussen, "and if you never seen anything before, just wait around. Can you believe that? I mean, if we tried to throw one and stick in one's tail as he was standing, still we'd go 0-for-1,000 – let alone at a run, let alone Gun Runner, let alone in the Whitney – and it stayed. [With] how fast he was going [during the race], it was held out from him. When he slowed down to walk, then it came into him. We were obviously unaware of it until he came back to the winner's circle, but not a nick on him. I mean, there's still nails in it." The shoe was originally thrown out by Asmussen's assistant trainer Scott Blasi, but after realizing the rarity of the situation Blasi paid $100 to a fan to get it back. It was eventually given to Asmussen's children. The race improved Gun Runner's rating to 127 in the Longines World's Best Racehorse Rankings August update, third place worldwide.

==== Autumn ====
On September 2, Gun Runner made his next start in the Woodward Stakes at Saratoga, going off as the prohibitive favorite in a field of five. Trainer Todd Pletcher entered two horses, with Neolithic assigned to set a fast early pace in the hopes of tiring Gun Runner, while Rally Cry was intended to close from behind. The race went much as expected, with Gun Runner stalking Neolithic for the first 6 furlongs before swinging to the lead on the far turn. Gun Runner maintained his momentum and won by 10 1/4 lengths over the late-closing Rally Cry. His time of 1:47.43 was the fastest Woodward Stakes since the race was moved to Saratoga in 2006 and earned Gun Runner a Beyer Speed Figure of 115. He was also given a Timeform US rating of 142, the highest rating that the organization had ever assigned. "That was better than the Whitney, just stronger, faster overall,” said Geroux. "I don't think he's 100-percent cranked up yet. I really do think we have another step forward with him. We're going to need one against Arrogate."

A few weeks after the Woodward, Asmussen sent Gun Runner to California with Blasi, exercise rider Angel Garcia, and groom Gabino Gutierrez, allowing the horse time to acclimatize. The 2017 Breeders' Cup Classic was help on November 4 at Del Mar Racetrack. Going into the race, handicappers were divided over who was the best horse in North America. Arrogate's victory in the Dubai World Cup over Gun Runner had been ranked as the best performance of the year up to that point in the World's Best Racehorse rankings, but Arrogate had suffered two losses after returning to the United States. By contrast, Gun Runner had won three straight Grade I races and appeared to be getting stronger. Gun Runner was made the 9–5 morning-line favorite over Arrogate at 2–1 in a field of eleven. By post time, the odds on Gun Runner had drifted out slightly to 2.4–1, making him the second betting choice. Collected, who had beaten Arrogate in the Pacific Classic earlier in the year, was the third choice.

Gun Runner broke well and quickly moved up to the lead with Collected pressing him on the outside. They ran the opening quarter in a rapid 22.50 seconds, then Gun Runner opened a slight lead as he moved around the first turn and down the backstretch. Geroux kept him on a light rein, later saying that the horse was relaxed and happy, "flopping his ear back and forth." Rounding the final turn, Collected closed ground and the two were head-and-head with a quarter of a mile remaining. Entering the stretch, Gun Runner responded to the challenge and again pulled away, winning by 2 1/4 lengths. Arrogate was never a factor in the race after breaking poorly, finishing in a dead heat for fifth.

Gun Runner earned a career-high Beyer Speed Figure of 117 while earning his first win at a distance of 1 1/4 miles, coming in his first start at Del Mar. He also won despite an apparent track bias where front runners on the inside of the track seemed to be at a disadvantage. "Things you’re scared of allow you to prove yourself,” said Asmussen. "This was the stage where you need to be at your best, and he was at his best."

In the final edition of the World rankings for 2017, Gun Runner was given a rating on 130, making him the third-best horse in the world, four pounds behind Arrogate, three behind Winx, and level with Cracksman.

=== 2018: Pegasus World Cup ===
On January 25, 2018, Gun Runner was voted American Champion Older Dirt Male Horse and Horse of the Year for 2017. He became the third Horse of the Year winner for trainer Steve Asmussen.

Two nights later, Gun Runner entered his last race, the Pegasus World Cup. He drew an outside post position, which was cause for concern in a race of 1 1/8 miles at Gulfstream Park, where the start is very close to the first turn. However, Geroux used Gun Runner's early speed to get racing room and moved quickly towards the rail, settling in second place just to the outside of Collected. The two set a brisk early pace, then Gun Runner made his move on the far turn. Collected dropped back but West Coast started to close, getting to within a length in mid-stretch before Gun Runner responded by pulling away to a 2 1/2 length win. Gun Runner ended his career on a five-race winning streak – all of them Grade 1 tests. The $7,000,000 winner's purse brought his lifetime earnings to $15,988,500, which ranks second all-time among North American-based thoroughbreds.

== Racing statistics ==
Date	Age	Distance	Race	Grade	Track	Odds	Field	Finish	Winning time	Winning (Losing) margin	Jockey	Ref
Sep 11, 2015	2	1 mile	Maiden Special Weight	Maiden	Churchill Downs	5.10	8	1	1:37.83	3/4 lengths	Ricardo Santana Jr.	
Oct 17, 2015	2	1 1/16 miles	Allowance	Allowance	Keeneland	3.50	8	1	1:44.69	2 lengths	Ricardo Santana Jr.	
Nov 28, 2015	2	1 1/16 miles	Kentucky Jockey Club Stakes	II	Churchill Downs	4.90	13	4	1:45.48	(3 1/4 lengths)	Julien Leparoux	
Feb 20, 2016	3	1 1/16 miles	Risen Star Stakes	II	Fair Grounds	5.10	11	1	1:43.94	1/2 length	Florent Geroux	
Mar 26, 2016	3	1 1/8 miles	Louisiana Derby	II	Fair Grounds	3.90	10	1	1:51.06	4 1/2 lengths	Florent Geroux	
May 7, 2016	3	1 1/4 miles	Kentucky Derby	I	Churchill Downs	10.30	20	3	2:01.31	(4 1/2 lengths)	Florent Geroux	
Jun 18, 2016	3	1 1/16 miles	Matt Winn Stakes	III	Churchill Downs	0.10*	6	1	1:41.12	5 1/4 lengths	Florent Geroux	
Jul 31, 2016	3	1 1/8 miles	Haskell Invitational	I	Monmouth Park	3.30	6	5	1:48.70	(6 1/4 lengths)	Florent Geroux	
Aug 27, 2016	3	1 1/4 miles	Travers Stakes	I	Saratoga	9.70	13	3	1:59.36	(15 lengths)	Florent Geroux	
Sep 24, 2016	3	1 1/8 miles	Pennsylvania Derby	II	Parx Racing	5.20	12	2	1:50.20	(1/2 length)	Florent Geroux	
Nov 4, 2016	3	1 mile	Breeders' Cup Dirt Mile	I	Santa Anita	4.00	9	2	1:35.72	(3 1/2 lengths)	Florent Geroux	
Nov 25, 2016	3	1 1/8 miles	Clark Handicap	I	Churchill Downs	2.10*	10	1	1:48.50	2 3/4 lengths	Florent Geroux	
Feb 20, 2017	4	1 1/16 miles	Razorback Handicap	III	Oaklawn Park	0.20*	6	1	1:40.97	5 3/4 lengths	Florent Geroux	
Mar 25, 2017	4	1 1/4 miles	Dubai World Cup	I	Meydan Racecourse	7.00	14	2	2:02.15	(2 1/4 lengths)	Florent Geroux	
Jun 17, 2017	4	1 1/8 miles	Stephen Foster Handicap	I	Churchill Downs	0.50*	8	1	1:47.56	7 lengths	Florent Geroux	
Aug 5, 2017	4	1 1/8 miles	Whitney Stakes	I	Saratoga	0.60*	7	1	1:47.71	5 1/4 lengths	Florent Geroux	
Sep 2, 2017	4	1 1/8 miles	Woodward Stakes	I	Saratoga	0.35*	5	1	1:47.43	10 1/4 lengths	Florent Geroux	
Nov 4, 2017	4	1 1/4 miles	Breeders' Cup Classic	I	Del Mar	2.40	11	1	2:01.29	2 1/4 lengths	Florent Geroux	
Jan 27, 2018	5	1 1/8 miles	Pegasus World Cup	I	Gulfstream Park	1.10*	12	1	1:47.41	2 1/2 lengths	Florent Geroux	

An asterisk after the odds means Gun Runner was the post time favorite.

== Awards ==
In 2024 Gun Runner was elected to the National Museum of Racing and Hall of Fame in his first year of eligibility. His formal induction took place in Saratoga Springs, New York on August 2, 2024.

== Stud career ==
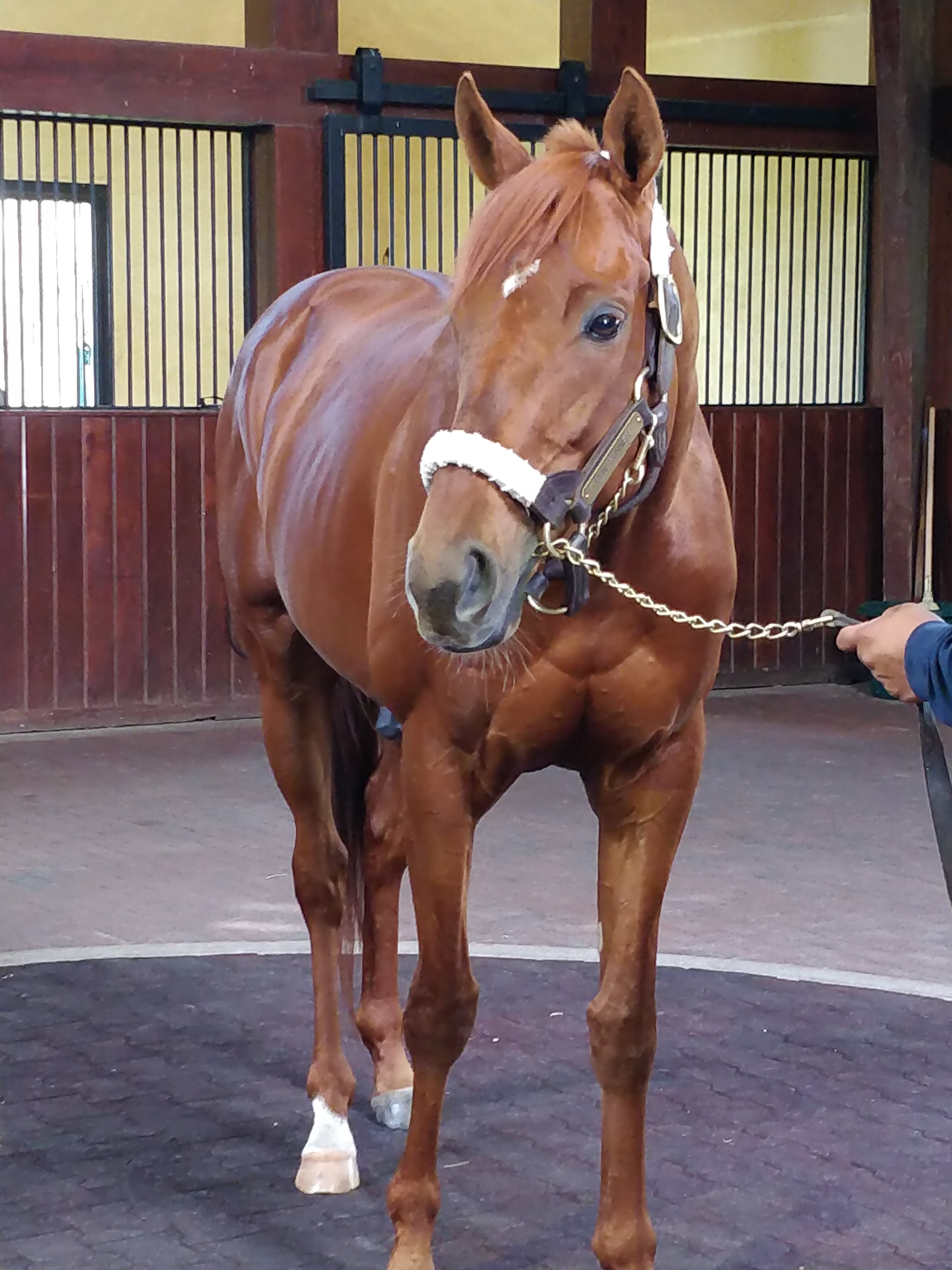
Gun Runner in retirement at Three Chimneys Farm

After the Pegasus World Cup, Gun Runner was retired to stud at Three Chimneys for an advertised fee of $70,000 in his first season. During the 2018 breeding season, he covered 172 mares. Gun Runner's first reported foal was born on January 17, 2019, when Argentinean Group 1 winner Giuliet Seattle foaled a filly at Shadai Farm in Japan.

Gun Runner was the leading first-crop sire of 2021, setting a freshman earnings record of $4.3 million. His leading performer was Echo Zulu, the American Champion Two-Year-Old Filly and winner of the Breeders' Cup Juvenile Fillies.

In 2022, Early Voting provided Gun Runner with a classic winner (Preakness Stakes) in his first crop. In 2022, Gun Runner stood for $125,000. On September 24, 2022, Gun Runner's progeny won both Grade 1 events at Parx Racing and three stakes events at Churchill Downs. Also during the September Yearling Sale at Keeneland five of his offspring were sold for over $1 million, with one filly dropping the hammer at $1.5 million.

In 2024 Gun Runner will stand for a fee of $250,000. The leading freshman sire of 2021, top second-crop sire of 2022, and current leading third-crop sire (as of October 13, 2023) is the first stallion in history to have sired nine individual millionaires with just two full crops.

In October 2026 Three Chimneys announced that Gun Runner would stand for a private fee in 2027.

=== Notable progeny ===
c = colt, f = filly, g = gelding

Foaled	Name	Sex	Major Wins
2019	Cyberknife	c	Arkansas Derby, Haskell Stakes
2019	Early Voting	c	Preakness Stakes
2019	Echo Zulu	f	Spinaway Stakes, Frizette Stakes, Breeders' Cup Juvenile Fillies, Ballerina Handicap
2019	Gunite	c	Hopeful Stakes, Forego Stakes
2019	Society	f	Cotillion Stakes, Ballerina Handicap
2019	Taiba	c	Santa Anita Derby, Pennsylvania Derby, Malibu Stakes
2020	Vahva	f	Derby City Distaff Stakes
2021	Locked	c	Breeders' Futurity Stakes, Santa Anita Handicap
2021	Sierra Leone	c	Blue Grass Stakes, Breeders' Cup Classic, Whitney Stakes
2023	Super Corredora	f	Breeders' Cup Juvenile Fillies, Zenyatta Stakes
2023	Further Ado	c	Blue Grass Stakes, Breeders' Cup Dirt Mile
2023	Always a Runner	f	Kentucky Oaks
2023	Finger	c	Haneda Hai, Tokyo Derby
2023	My Gun's Loaded	f	Alabama Stakes
2023	Leading Change	c	Travers Stakes

== Pedigree ==
Pedigree of Gun Runner (USA), chestnut stallion, foaled March 8, 2013
Sire Candy Ride (ARG) 1999	Ride the Rails; 1991	Cryptoclearance	Fappiano
Sire Candy Ride (ARG) 1999	Ride the Rails; 1991	Cryptoclearance	Naval Orange
Sire Candy Ride (ARG) 1999	Ride the Rails; 1991	Herbalesian	Herbager (FR)
Sire Candy Ride (ARG) 1999	Ride the Rails; 1991	Herbalesian	Alanesian
Sire Candy Ride (ARG) 1999	Candy Girl (ARG); 1990	Candy Stripes	Blushing Groom (FR)
Sire Candy Ride (ARG) 1999	Candy Girl (ARG); 1990	Candy Stripes	Bubble Company (FR)
Sire Candy Ride (ARG) 1999	Candy Girl (ARG); 1990	City Girl (ARG)	Farnesio (ARG)
Sire Candy Ride (ARG) 1999	Candy Girl (ARG); 1990	City Girl (ARG)	Cithara
Dam Quiet Giant 2007	Giant's Causeway; 1997	Storm Cat	Storm Bird (CAN)
Dam Quiet Giant 2007	Giant's Causeway; 1997	Storm Cat	Terlingua
Dam Quiet Giant 2007	Giant's Causeway; 1997	Mariah's Storm	Rahy
Dam Quiet Giant 2007	Giant's Causeway; 1997	Mariah's Storm	Immense
Dam Quiet Giant 2007	Quiet Dance; 1993	Quiet American	Fappiano
Dam Quiet Giant 2007	Quiet Dance; 1993	Quiet American	Demure
Dam Quiet Giant 2007	Quiet Dance; 1993	Misty Dancer	Lyphard
Dam Quiet Giant 2007	Quiet Dance; 1993	Misty Dancer	Flight Dancer (Family: 17-b)

Gun Runner is inbred 4S × 4D to Fappiano, meaning Fappiano appears in the fourth generation on both the sire and dam's side of the pedigree. Gun Runner is also inbred to Blushing Groom 4S × 5D and Lyphard 5S × 4D.

== See also ==
- List of leading Thoroughbred racehorses
