= Florent Geroux =

French jockey

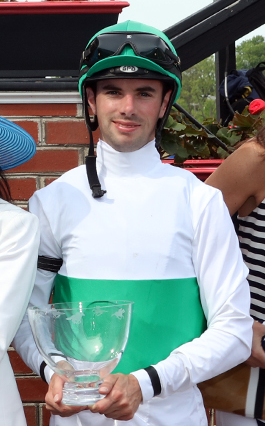
- Geroux in 2016

Personal information
- Born: July 16, 1986 (age 40) Argentan, France
- Occupation: Jockey

Horse racing career
- Sport: Horse racing
- Career wins: 2,182+

Major racing wins
- Stars and Stripes Handicap (2014, 2015); Arlington Million (2015, 2023); Queen Elizabeth II Challenge Cup (2015); Cotillion Stakes (2015, 2022); Opening Verse Stakes (2015); Louisiana Derby (2016); United Nations Stakes (2016); Ogden Phipps Stakes (2016); Belmont Oaks (2016); Beverly D. Stakes (2016); Secretariat Stakes (2016); Natalma Stakes (2016); Spinster Stakes (2016); E.P. Taylor Stakes (2016); Delaware Handicap (2016); Edgewood Stakes (2016, 2017); Clark Handicap (2016, 2018); La Troienne Stakes (2017, 2020, 2021); Stephen Foster Handicap (2017); Whitney Stakes (2017); Woodward Stakes (2017); Pegasus World Cup (2018); Ashland Stakes (2018); Kentucky Oaks (2018, 2020); Acorn Stakes (2018); Ashland Stakes (2018); Coaching Club American Oaks (2018); Highlander Stakes (2018); Shoemaker Mile Stakes (2019); Frank E. Kilroe Mile Stakes (2021); St. Louis Derby (2025) American Classics wins: Kentucky Derby (2021); Breeders' Cup wins: Breeders' Cup Sprint (2014); Breeders' Cup Juvenile Fillies Turf (2015, 2020); Breeders' Cup Turf Sprint (2015); Breeders' Cup Classic (2017); Breeders' Cup Distaff (2018, 2020)

Significant horses
- Gun Runner, Monomoy Girl, Catch A Glimpse, I'm a Chatterbox, The Pizza Man, Work All Week, Mongolian Saturday, Shedaresthedevil, Set Piece
- Updated on November 7, 2020

Florent Geroux (born July 16, 1986) is a French jockey who has earned over 1,700 wins in American thoroughbred horse racing, including the 2017 Breeders' Cup Classic on Gun Runner, two Breeders' Cup Distaff wins with Monomoy Girl, and the 2021 Kentucky Derby on Mandaloun.

== Background ==
Geroux was born in 1986 Argentan, France. His father Dominique was a jockey and later a trainer in France. At age 13, Geroux was accepted into the French riding academy, Afasec. He later started riding in France and became a leading apprentice. He secured his first win on May 6, 2004, at Longchamp on Chopyluz.

Geroux married Kasey Spindler, whose father was a Chicago-based jockey, Louis Spindler. The couple have two children, Olivia and Celine.

On May 23, 2018, Geroux became a U.S. citizen, taking the Oath of Allegiance at the naturalization ceremony in Louisville, Kentucky.

== North American career ==
Geroux came to the United States for the first time in early 2007, working with trainer Patrick Biancone for a few months before returning briefly to France.

In the fall of 2007, Geroux returned to the United States with the intention of joining the Kentucky racing circuit. On the opening day at Keeneland, he suffered a serious fall, suffering a broken wrist and two fractured vertebrae. He recuperated in France for several months then returned to the States with Chicago as his home base. He enjoyed some success over the next years, finishing tenth in the Arlington jockey standings in 2010 and winning the 2011 Hawthorne meet. He earned his first stakes wins on Zoeling in the 2010 Leemat Stakes at Presque Isle Downs.

In 2010, Geroux changed agents to Doug Bredar and gradually climbed the jockey ranks in the Chicago area. In 2014, Geroux scored his first Grade I victory in the Breeders' Cup Sprint aboard Chicago-based Work All Week.

In 2015, Geroux relocated to Kentucky and was the leading rider at Kentucky Downs, where he won five races on two different days, and also led the Fair Grounds 2015-6 meet. He won the Arlington Million with The Pizza Man and the Breeders' Cup Juvenile Fillies Turf with Catch a Glimpse and the Breeders' Cup Turf Sprint with Mongolian Saturday.

Geroux had a career best year in 2016, with earnings of $17,690,013 and 217 wins, including two Grade I wins on I'm a Chatterbox. He picked up the mount on Gun Runner at the start of the year and rode him to a win in the Louisiana Derby and a third-place finish in the Kentucky Derby. After the pair finished second in the Breeders' Cup Dirt Mile, they capped the year with a win in the Clark Handicap. Another highlight was winning four graded races on Arlington Million Day: the Beverly D, Secretariat, American St. Leger and Pucker Up. He earned his 1,000th North American win on December 29 aboard Mr. Misunderstood at the Fair Grounds.

In 2017, Geroux was ranked in the top ten of North American jockeys. With Gun Runner, he won the Breeders' Cup Classic and four other stakes race, plus a second-place finish in the Dubai World Cup. "You ride a thousand horses a year, and this one, there's just something special," said Geroux of his connection in Gun Runner. "I'm not a true believer in that, but I do believe now."

In 2021, Geroux rode Mandaloun to a second-place finish in the Kentucky Derby. However, Mandaloun was later elevated to winner after Medina Spirit was disqualified for a positive betamethasone test post-race.

=== Year-end charts ===
Chart (2007–present)	Rank by earnings
National Earnings List for Jockeys 2007	1105
National Earnings List for Jockeys 2008	595
National Earnings List for Jockeys 2009	260
National Earnings List for Jockeys 2010	212
National Earnings List for Jockeys 2011	78
National Earnings List for Jockeys 2012	126
National Earnings List for Jockeys 2013	96
National Earnings List for Jockeys 2014	35
National Earnings List for Jockeys 2015	13
National Earnings List for Jockeys 2016	5
National Earnings List for Jockeys 2017	7
National Earnings List for Jockeys 2018	5
National Earnings List for Jockeys 2019	13
National Earnings List for Jockeys 2020	6
National Earnings List for Jockeys 2021	7
