= Arrogate =

American-bred Thoroughbred racehorse

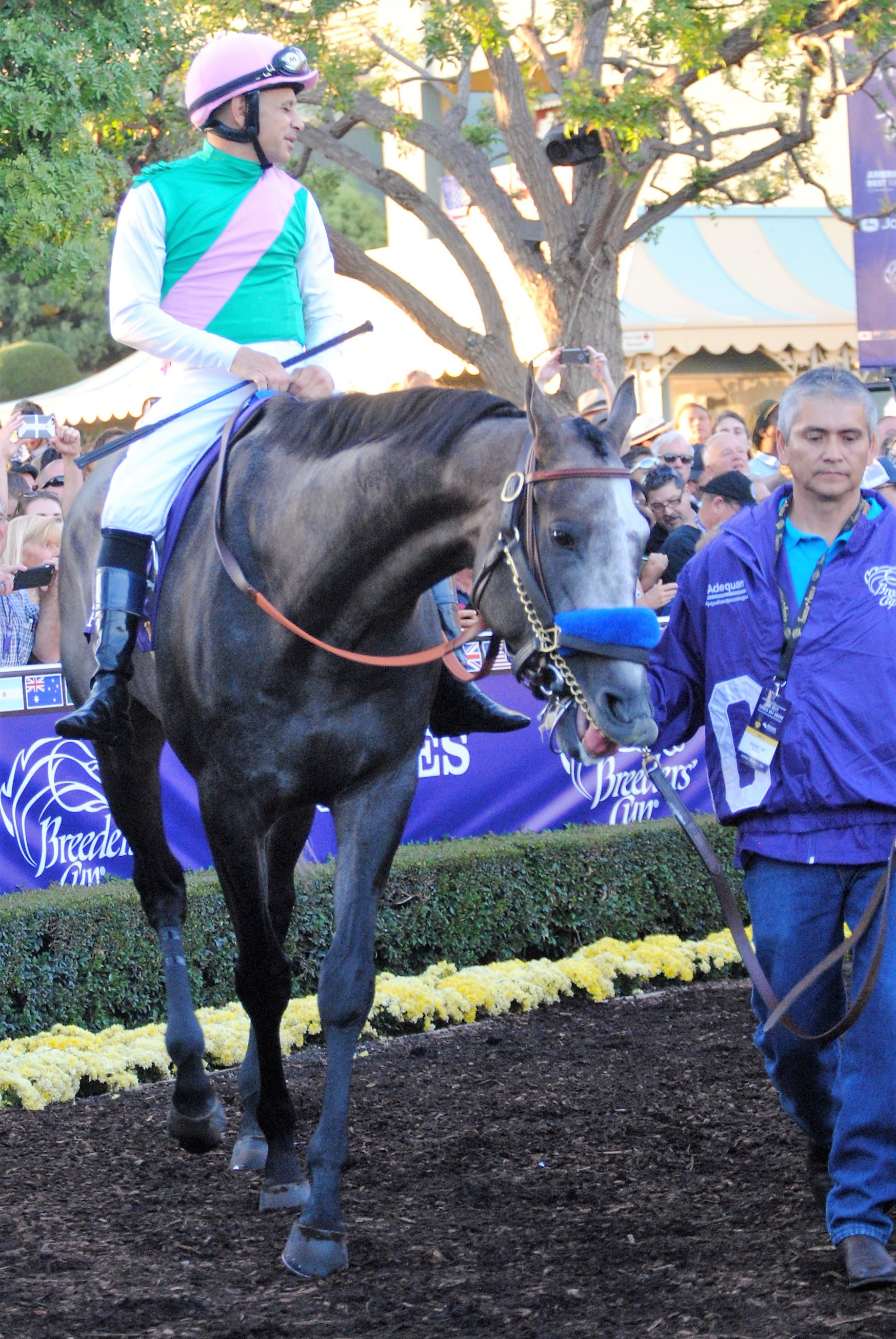
- Arrogate with Mike Smith prior to the 2016 Breeders' Cup Classic
- Sire: Unbridled's Song
- Grandsire: Unbridled
- Dam: Bubbler
- Damsire: Distorted Humor
- Sex: Stallion
- Foaled: April 11, 2013
- Died: June 2, 2020 (aged 7)
- Country: United States
- Color: Gray
- Breeder: Clearsky Farms
- Owner: Juddmonte Farms
- Trainer: Bob Baffert
- Record: 11: 7–1–1
- Earnings: $17,422,600

Major wins
- Travers Stakes (2016); Breeders' Cup Classic (2016); Pegasus World Cup (2017); Dubai World Cup (2017)

Awards
- American Champion Three-Year-Old Male Horse (2016); IFHA World's Best Racehorse (2016, 2017); Timeform rating: 139

Honors
- National Museum of Racing and Hall of Fame (2023)
- Last updated on July 23, 2017

Arrogate (April 11, 2013 – June 2, 2020) was a Thoroughbred racehorse. He was notable as the all-time leading North American-based runner by earnings.

Arrogate won the 2016 Travers Stakes in a record time in his first stakes appearance. He won the Breeders' Cup Classic, by defeating California Chrome and was named the American Champion Three-Year-Old Male Horse and World's Best Racehorse of 2016. As a four-year old, Arrogate won the 2017 Pegasus World Cup and the Dubai World Cup.

Upon returning to the United States, however, Arrogate suffered three straight defeats. He retired with a record of seven wins from eleven starts. Despite having only four stakes race wins, the large purses made him the all-time leading money earner in North America.

Arrogate was euthanized at age seven.

In 2023, Arrogate was inducted into the National Museum of Racing and Hall of Fame.

== Background ==
Arrogate was a gray horse bred in Kentucky by Clearsky Farms. As a yearling, the colt was consigned to the Keeneland September sale and was bought for $560,000 by Juddmonte Farms, the racing operation of Khalid ibn Abdullah. Arrogate was sent into training with Bob Baffert in California. Arrogate's front teeth were knocked out as a yearling, probably due to being kicked by another horse. One tooth became infected and was removed, which slowed down his eating but otherwise had no impact.

Arrogate was sired by the Breeders' Cup Juvenile winner Unbridled's Song, whose other major winners have included Will Take Charge, the sprinter Zensational and Breeders' Cup winners Unrivaled Belle and Unbridled Elaine. Arrogate's dam Bubbler was a successful racehorse who won six of her nine races.

== Racing career ==
=== 2016: three-year-old season ===
Arrogate made his track debut in a six-furlong maiden race at Los Alamitos Race Course on April 17, 2016. Ridden by Martin Garcia, he started the odds-on favorite and finished third behind Westbrook and Accelerate. On June 5, he was moved up in distance and recorded his first victory in a maiden race over 1 1/16 miles (1.7 km) at Santa Anita Park, leading from the start and winning by two and a half lengths from Giant Expectations. He was partnered in this race by Rafael Bejarano, who rode him in his next two races. Nineteen days later, at the same track, Arrogate contested an allowance race against older horses and won again, beating Fusaichi Samurai by five and a quarter lengths after leading from the start. On August 4, the colt appeared in an allowance race at Del Mar and started odd-on favorite against two older opponents. After racing in third place in the early running, he took the lead in the straight and won by one and three quarter lengths.

On August 27, Arrogate was moved up sharply in class to contest the Grade I Travers Stakes at Saratoga Race Course in which his rivals included Exaggerator and Creator, winners respectively of the Preakness Stakes and the Belmont Stakes. Bejarano elected to ride another of Baffert's horses, American Freedom, so veteran jockey Mike Smith picked up the ride. Having drawn post position 1 in a large field, Arrogate was ridden hard from the starting gate and set fast opening fractions. As they turned into the stretch, he broke clear of his rivals, winning by thirteen and a half lengths over his stablemate American Freedom, with Creator finishing seventh and Exaggerator eleventh.

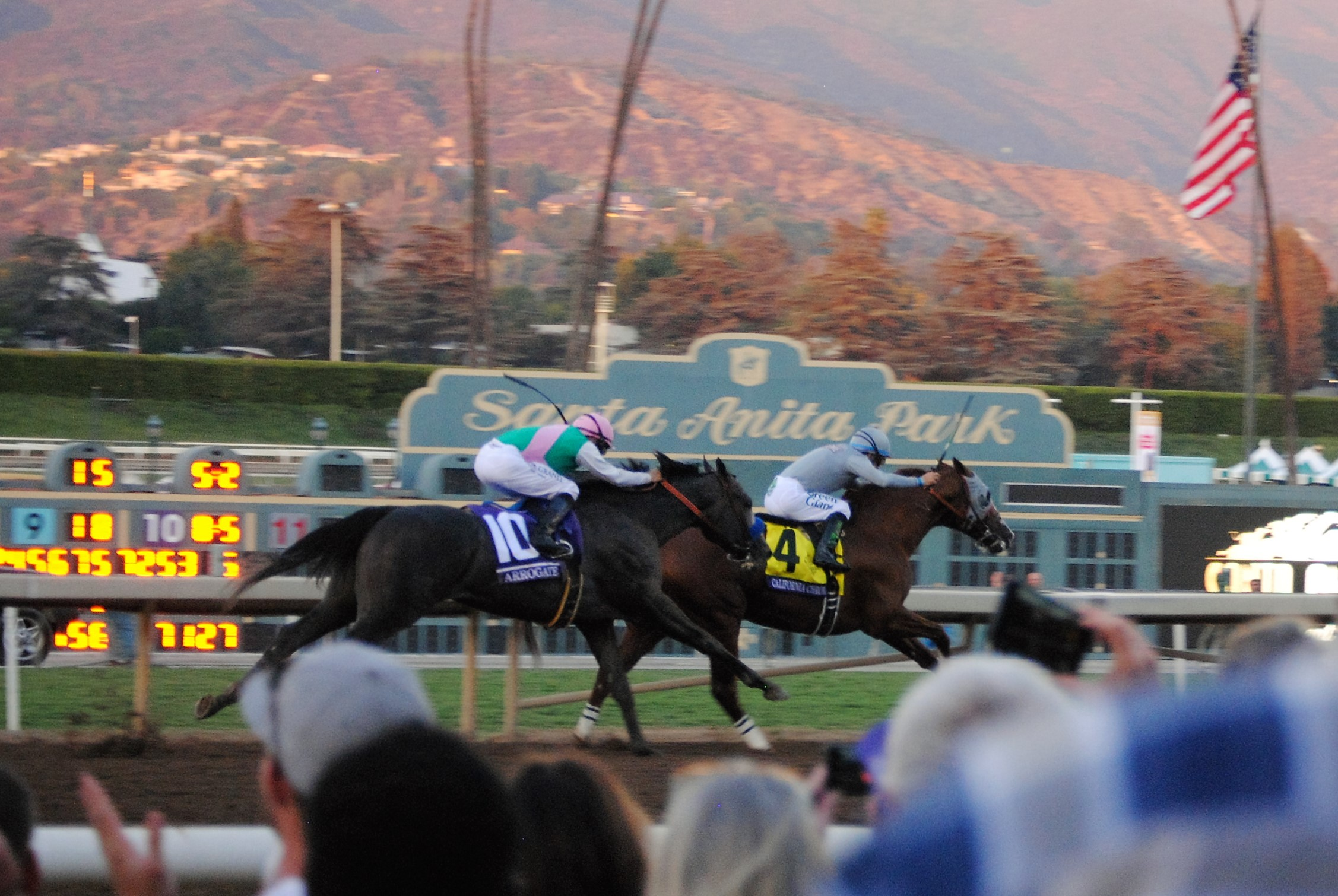
Arrogate (#10) overtook California Chrome (#4) in the final yards of the race to win the Breeders' Cup Classic

His final time of 1:59.36 for the 1 1/4 miles (2.0 km) distance eclipsed General Assembly's Travers and track record of 2:00 that had stood for 37 years. Baffert said, "You're always hoping that they're that good. I knew he was good, but I didn't know he was really, really that kind of good." The horse earned a Beyer Speed Figure of 122 for his effort and became a contender for the year end Eclipse award.

On November 5, Arrogate entered the Breeders' Cup Classic as the second favorite behind 5-year-old California Chrome. California Chrome led from the outset, while Arrogate tracked in third. The horses engaged in the homestretch and in the final yards, Arrogate surged ahead to defeat California Chrome by half a length. The two dominated the remainder of the field by over 10 lengths. Art Sherman said of Arrogate, "That winner is the real McCoy, I knew he was the one we had to beat, but I didn't know how good he was." Post-race analysis gave California Chrome a Beyer Speed Figure of 119, the highest of his career, but Arrogate topped it with a 120.

The race earned Arrogate the top position in the World's Best Racehorse Rankings published by the International Federation of Horseracing Authorities on November 10 with a rating of 134, one point ahead of California Chrome. Arrogate was voted the Eclipse Award as American Champion Three-Year-Old Male Horse.

=== 2017: four-year-old season ===
Arrogate was originally scheduled to begin his four-year-old campaign in the San Pasqual Stakes but heavy rains at Santa Anita caused Baffert to scratch him from the race. Instead, he trained Arrogate up to the $12 million Pegasus World Cup at Gulfstream Park on January 28, 2017. The race was promoted as a final match-up with California Chrome, who was retiring to stud after the race. Both horses were compromised by the post position draw. Arrogate drew post position one and risked getting trapped along the rail in traffic. California Chrome drew the outside post, which caused him to be carried wide in the first turn. He eventually settled behind the early leaders alongside Arrogate but did not respond when the latter made his move, possibly having wrenched his leg early in the race. He was eased to prevent the possibility of further injury and finished ninth. Meanwhile, Arrogate swept to the lead and drew off to win by nearly five lengths over longshot Shaman Ghost. The timing of the race proved controversial. The original time, measured by Trakus based on transmitters in the horses' saddle cloths, was 1:47.61. However, clocking experts hand-timed the race faster, at around 1:46.9. The timing controversy caused the Beyer Speed Figure for Arrogate to be increased from 116 to 119. Gulfstream did a frame-by-frame video analysis and determined that the correct time was 1:46.83, a track record.

Arrogate made his next start on March 25 in the Dubai World Cup at Meydan Racecourse. He broke poorly and was then squeezed between other horses, causing him to drop to the back of the fourteen horse field. Baffert feared that the colt had lost all chance but Mike Smith reacted calmly, saying later that he rode him like Zenyatta, who was famous for her closing kick. Once Arrogate recovered his stride, Smith took him to the outside of the field and started to steadily make up ground. When they entered the stretch, Arrogate started to close rapidly and moved by Gun Runner to win by 2 1/4 lengths. On a track labeled as muddy, he completed the 2,000 metres (6,600 ft) (roughly 10 furlongs) in 2:02.23. His share of the $10 million purse took his career prize-winning to $17,084,600, a North American record. "Everybody who was here tonight is going to say, 'I'm glad I was here to see that,'" said Baffert. "If anybody wasn't super impressed with that, they just don't like horse racing. I still can't believe he won the race."

After returning to the United States, Arrogate was given some time off, then was entered in the San Diego Handicap at Del Mar on July 22, where he carried the top weight of 126 pounds. He was heavily favored at odds of 1–20, with his main rival in a field of five being Accelerate, whose main claim to fame at the time was finishing second ahead of Arrogate in their April 2016 maiden race. However, Arrogate unexpectedly finished fourth, over fifteen lengths behind Accelerate. Mike Watchmaker, a handicapper writing for the Daily Racing Form commented, "He lacked any interest in getting involved in the run to or around the first turn, and the little move he made on the far turn was actually an optical illusion." Another writer called it the biggest upset in the history of Del Mar. "He gallops and works faster than that," said Smith. "I'm dumbfounded."

Arrogate was next entered in the Pacific Classic on August 19, also at Del Mar. Facing off against six other horses, he stalked the pace set by his stablemate Collected for much of the race, then began to close in on him in the stretch. However, it was not enough to catch Collected, who won by half a length. Following the race, Baffert said it felt "weird" that Collected had won and not Arrogate. "I feel like my older son was beaten by my younger son," he told the Daily Racing Form.

Baffert trained Arrogate up to the 2017 Breeders' Cup Classic on November 4, a layoff of over two months. The horse put in several good workouts at his training base in Santa Anita, but handicappers were still concerned about his ability to handle the Del Mar track at which the Classic would be held. Arrogate drew post position one for the race, and Smith announced his intention to be aggressive out of the starting gate in order to avoid being trapped on the rail. Arrogate was made the 2–1 second choice on the morning line behind Gun Runner, who had won three straight Grade I races since returning from Dubai. However, Arrogate ducked in at the start and lost ground to the rest of the field. He was never a factor and finished in a dead heat for fifth, 7 1/2 lengths behind Gun Runner.

Smith blamed the loss on Arrogate's dislike for the Del Mar surface. "He just won't run over here. I've tried to talk myself into thinking he would. He has just showed me time and time again that he wouldn't." Baffert said that Arrogate was "like a pitcher who can't find the plate...He's just not the horse he was."

== Race record ==
Date	Race	Grade	Track	Distance	Odds	Finish	Time	Margin	Jockey	Ref
2016 – Three-year-old season
April 17, 2016	Maiden Special Weight		Los Alamitos	6 furlongs	0.50	3	1:09.14	(3/4 length)	Martin Garcia	
June 5, 2016	Maiden Special Weight		Santa Anita Park	1 1/16 miles	0.90*	1	1:41.80	4 1/2 lengths	Rafael Bejarano	
June 24, 2016	Allowance Optional Claiming		Santa Anita Park	1 1/16 miles	0.60*	1	1:41.14	5 1/4 lengths	Rafael Bejarano	
August 4, 2016	Allowance Optional Claiming		Del Mar	1 1/16 miles	0.10*	1	1:41.76	1 3/4 lengths	Rafael Bejarano	
August 27, 2016	Travers Stakes	I	Saratoga	1 1/4 miles	11.70	1	1:59.36 (Note: New track record at Saratoga for the 1 1/4 miles distance)	13 1/2 lengths	Mike Smith	
November 5, 2016	Breeders' Cup Classic	I	Santa Anita Park	1 1/4 miles	1.70*	1	2:00.11	1/2 length	Mike Smith	
2017 – Four-year-old season
January 28, 2017	Pegasus World Cup	I	Gulfstream Park	1 1/8 miles	0.90*	1	1:46.83 (Note: New track record at Gulfstream Park for the 1 1/8 miles distance)	4 3/4 lengths	Mike Smith	
March 25, 2017	Dubai World Cup	I	Meydan (UAE)	2000 metres (Note: Distance for the event was approximately 1 1/4 miles)	N/A (Note: Arrogate's final odds with British Bookmakers were 1/3 odds-on since gambling is prohibited in the United Arab Emirates)	1	2:02.15	2 1/4 lengths	Mike Smith	
July 22, 2017	San Diego Handicap	II	Del Mar	1 1/16 miles	0.05*	4	1:42.15	(15 3/4 lengths)	Mike Smith	
August 19, 2017	Pacific Classic	I	Del Mar	1 1/4 miles	0.70*	2	2:00.70	(1/2 length)	Mike Smith	
November 4, 2017	Breeders' Cup Classic	I	Del Mar	1 1/4 miles	2.10*	5 (Note: Dead heat for fifth place with Gunnevera)	2:01.29	(6 1/4 lengths)	Mike Smith	

Notes:
An (*) asterisk after the odds means Arrogate was the post-time favorite.

== Retirement, death, and legacy ==
Arrogate was retired following the 2017 Breeder's Cup Classic. Juddmonte Farm announced his fee for 2018 would be $75,000.

In the last week of May 2020, Arrogate's stud schedule was suspended when he appeared to be suffering from soreness in his neck. In early June 2020, Juddmonte Farm reported that Arrogate had been euthanized . A statement from the farm said Arrogate "was transported to the Hagyard Clinic under the care of Dr. Bob Hunt and Dr. Nathan Slovis with Dr. Steve Reed representing the insurance company." The exact nature of the ailment was not diagnosed despite diagnostic testing including MRI, CT, bloodwork, and X-rays. Arrogate's death increased news focus on trainer Bob Baffert.

Arrogate's first wins as a sire came on September 7, 2021, when his daughter Adversity broke her maiden at Saratoga. Less than an hour later, his son Affable Monarch won his maiden race. In 2023, Arcangelo, from Arrogate's penultimate crop, won the Belmont Stakes and Travers Stakes. Arcangelo was withdrawn from the 2023 Breeder's Cup Classic and was retired to stand at stud at Lane's End Farm. Arrogate's posthumous son Seize the Grey won the 2024 Preakness Stakes.

=== Notable progeny ===
c = colt, f = filly, g = gelding

Foaled	Name	Sex	Major Wins
2019	Fun To Dream	f	La Brea Stakes
2019	Secret Oath	f	Kentucky Oaks
2020	And Tell Me Nolies	f	Del Mar Debutante Stakes
2020	Arcangelo	c	Belmont Stakes, Travers Stakes
2020	Cave Rock	c	Del Mar Futurity, American Pharoah Stakes
2021	Seize the Grey	c	Preakness Stakes, Pennsylvania Derby

== Pedigree ==
Pedigree of Arrogate (USA), gray, 2013
Sire Unbridled's Song (USA) 1993	Unbridled (USA); 1987	Fappiano	Mr. Prospector
Sire Unbridled's Song (USA) 1993	Unbridled (USA); 1987	Fappiano	Killaloe
Sire Unbridled's Song (USA) 1993	Unbridled (USA); 1987	Gana Facil	Le Fabuleux
Sire Unbridled's Song (USA) 1993	Unbridled (USA); 1987	Gana Facil	Charedi
Sire Unbridled's Song (USA) 1993	Trolley Song (USA); 1983	Caro	Fortino
Sire Unbridled's Song (USA) 1993	Trolley Song (USA); 1983	Caro	Chambord
Sire Unbridled's Song (USA) 1993	Trolley Song (USA); 1983	Lucky Spell	Lucky Mel
Sire Unbridled's Song (USA) 1993	Trolley Song (USA); 1983	Lucky Spell	Incantation
Dam Bubbler (USA) 2006	Distorted Humor (USA); 1993	Forty Niner	Mr. Prospector
Dam Bubbler (USA) 2006	Distorted Humor (USA); 1993	Forty Niner	File
Dam Bubbler (USA) 2006	Distorted Humor (USA); 1993	Danzig's Beauty	Danzig
Dam Bubbler (USA) 2006	Distorted Humor (USA); 1993	Danzig's Beauty	Sweetest Chant
Dam Bubbler (USA) 2006	Grechelle (USA); 1995	Deputy Minister	Vice Regent
Dam Bubbler (USA) 2006	Grechelle (USA); 1995	Deputy Minister	Mint Copy
Dam Bubbler (USA) 2006	Grechelle (USA); 1995	Meadow Star	Meadowlake
Dam Bubbler (USA) 2006	Grechelle (USA); 1995	Meadow Star	Inreality Star (Family: 16-g)

- Arrogate is linebred 4 × 4 to Mr. Prospector, meaning that this stallion appears twice in the fourth generation of his pedigree.

== See also ==
- List of leading Thoroughbred racehorses
- List of racehorses
