= Breeders' Cup Juvenile top three finishers =

Horse racing rankings

This is a listing of the horses that finished in either first, second, or third place in the Breeders' Cup Juvenile, a grade one race run on dirt held on Saturday of the Breeders' Cup World Thoroughbred Championships.

Year	Winner	Second	Third	Starters
2026	Hughes	American History	Salahudin	6
2025	Ted Noffey	Mr. A. P.	Brant	6
2024	Citizen Bull	Gaming	Hill Road	10
2023	Fierceness	Muth	Locked	9
2022	Forte	Cave Rock	National Treasure	10
2021	Corniche	Pappacap	Giant Game	11
2020	Essential Quality	Hot Rod Charlie	Keepmeinmind	14
2019	Storm the Court	Anneau d'Or	Wrecking Crew	8
2018	Game Winner	Knicks Go	Signalman	13
2017	Good Magic	Solomini	Bolt d'Oro	12
2016	Classic Empire	Not This Time	Practical Joke	11
2015	Nyquist	Swipe	Brody's Cause	14
2014	Texas Red	Carpe Diem	Upstart	11
2013	New Year's Day	Havana	Strong Mandate	13
2012	Shanghai Bobby	He's Had Enough	Capo Bastone	9
2011	Hansen	Union Rags	Creative Cause	13
2010	Uncle Mo	Boys at Toscanova	Rogue Romance	11
2009	Vale of York	Lookin at Lucky	Noble's Promise	13
2008	Midshipman	Square Eddie	Street Hero	12
2007	War Pass	Pyro	Kodiak Kowboy	11
2006	Street Sense	Circular Quay	Great Hunter	14
2005	Stevie Wonderboy	Henny Hughes	First Samurai	14
2004	Wilko	Afleet Alex	Sun King	8
2003	Action This Day	Minister Eric	Chapel Royal	12
2002	Vindication	Kafwain	Hold That Tiger	13
2001	Johannesburg	Repent	Siphonic	12
2000	Macho Uno	Point Given	Street Cry	14
1999	Anees	Chief Seattle	High Yield	14
1998	Answer Lively	Aly's Alley	Cat Thief	13
1997	Favorite Trick	Dawson's Legacy	Nationalore	8
1996	Boston Harbor	Acceptable	Ordway	10
1995	Unbridled's Song	Hennessy	Editor's Note	13
1994	Timber Country	Eltish	Tejano Run	13
1993	Brocco	Blumin Affair	Tabasco Cat	11
1992	Gilded Time	It'sali'lknownfact	River Special	13
1991	Arazi	Bertrando	Snappy Landing	14
1990	Fly So Free	Take Me Out	Lost Mountain	11
1989	Rhythm	Grand Canyon	Slavic	12
1988	Is It True	Easy Goer	Tagel	10
1987	Success Express	Regal Classic	Tejano	13
1986	Capote	Qualify	Alysheba	13
1985	Tasso	Storm Cat	Scat Dancer	13
1984	Chief's Crown	Tank's Prospect	Spend A Buck	10

== See also ==
- Breeders' Cup Juvenile
- Breeders' Cup World Thoroughbred Championships
