= 2027 Road to the Kentucky Derby =

Thoroughbred horse racing series

The 2027 Road to the Kentucky Derby is a series of races through which horses qualified for the 2027 Kentucky Derby, which will be held on May 1. The field for the Derby was limited to 20 horses, with up to four 'also eligibles' in case of a late withdrawal from the field. There were three separate paths for horses to take to qualify for the Derby: the main Road consisting of races in North America, the Japan Road consisting of four races in Japan, and the Euro/MidEast road consisting of seven races in England, Ireland, United Arab Emirates and France. The top five finishers in the specified races received points, with higher points awarded in the major prep races in March and April. Earnings in non-restricted stakes races acted as a tie breaker.

For 2027, the main Road to the Kentucky Derby consists of 36 races, with 20 races for the Kentucky Derby Prep Season and 16 races for the Kentucky Derby Championship Season, the same number as the 2026 Road to the Kentucky Derby with the following changes: (Note: See the following list for details)

- With the closing of Aqueduct Racetrack events that were held at that track are scheduled to be held at Belmont Park. These include all NYRA events.
- the Jerome Stakes at Belmont Park was not scheduled in 2027 and was removed from the Road to the Kentucky Derby.
- the distance of the Withers Stakes was shortened from 1 1/8 miles to 1 1/16 miles and moved to Belmont's Tapeta surface.
- the distance of the Gotham Stakes was lengthened from 1 mile to 1 1/8 miles and moved to Belmont's Tapeta surface.
- The Leonatus Stakes over a distance of 1 mile over the Tapeta synthetic track at Turfway Park was added as an initial prep event with 10-5-3-2-1 points awarded to the first five finishers.

== Standings ==
The following table shows the points earned in the eligible races for the main series.

As of 30 October 2026

Rank	Horse	Points	Earnings (Note: Earnings from non-restricted stakes prior to the running of the Kentucky Derby serve as a tie-breaker.)	Trainer	Owner	Ref
1	Hughes	40	$1,490,000	Bob Baffert	Front Row Club, Starlight Racing, Madaket Stables, Stonestreet Stables, Bashor Racing, Albaugh Family Stables, Robert E. Masterson, Golconda Stable, Waves Edge Capital & Catherine Donovan	
2	American History	25	$737,963	Todd A. Pletcher	WinStar Farm, First Go Racing & China Horse Club	
3	Salahudin	19	$512,660	Bob Baffert	Zedan Racing Stables	
4	Coach Pope	11	$228,375	Kenneth G. McPeek	Gainesway Stable, Shamrock Stables & Michael J. Mackin	
5	U. S. S. Valor	10	$275,000	Claude R. McGaughey III	Team Valor International	
6	Jas	10	$263,265	Steven M. Asmussen	Red Lane Thoroughbreds	
7	He Is No Lie	5	$152,050	Doug F. O'Neill	Purple Rein Racing & Mark D. Davis	
8	Gaudreau	5	$100,000	Chad C. Brown	Tanglewood Thoroughbreds, Thirty Year Racing, Bradley Thoroughbreds, Rodeo Creek Racing, Laura Leigh Stable & Swift Thoroughbreds	
9	Net Par	5	$60,000	Antonio Garcia	Reddam Racing	
10	Staunch	5	$39,400	Brendan P. Walsh	Bourbon Fueled Racing	
11	Q B Rocket	3	$64,188	Brad H. Cox	Spendthrift Farm & Frank Fletcher Racing Operations	
12	Damavand (Note: Damavand is ahead of Club Reign in the standings due to higher stakes earned from non-restricted stakes)	3	$60,000	Todd A. Pletcher	Amo Racing USA	
13	Club Reign	3	$60,000	D. Whitworth Beckman	Ribble Farms, Three Brand Racing & Walmac Farm	
14	Imperial Honor	3	$36,000	Bob Baffert	Karl Watson, Michael E. Pegram & Paul Weitman	
15	Caribbean Life	3	$29,550	William Walden	China Horse Club	
16	Mystik Bayou	3	$14,700	Kenneth G. McPeek	Four G Racing, Lance Gasaway & Daniel Hamby III	
17	Real Goodbar	2	$195,650	Kenneth G. McPeek	Bayview Stables, Mark Edwards & Mike Trout	
18	Blessed Flyer	2	$145,095	Michael Tomlinson	Patricia's Hope & Mike Farrar	
19	Domus	2	$36,000	Bob Baffert	Baoma Corporation	
20	Title Worthy	2	$32,093	Dallas Stewart	Commonwealth Stable, Rivers Thoroughbreds, On Our Own Stable & Dallas Stewart	
21	Earth Song	2	$30,000	Jorge Delgado	Amo Racing USA	
22	Johnny Hockey	1	$28,000	Antonio Arriaga	Conover Stable	
23	Jaded	1	$19,256	Mark E. Casse	D. J. Stable	
24	Real Gone	1	$8,865	Patrick Biancone	KMN Racing	
25	Emancipate	1	$6,000	Doug F. O'Neill	Cicero Farms	
26	Card Man	1	$5,910	Chad C. Brown	Jeffrey Drown	

Legend:

== Prep season ==
=== Initial prep events ===
Note: 1st=10 points; 2nd=5 points; 3rd=3 points; 4th=2 points; 5th=1 point (except the Breeders' Cup Juvenile: 1st=30 points; 2nd=15 points; 3rd=9 points; 4th=6 points; 5th=3 points)

The dates for most races shown below are based on the placement in the racing calendar from 2025/2026. Similarly, the purses shown below are based on the amounts from the previous year and will be updated when finalized.

Race	Distance	Purse	Grade	Track	Date	1st	2nd	3rd	4th	5th	Ref
Iroquois	1 mile	$300,000	3	Churchill Downs	Sep 12 2026	Salahudin	He Is No Lie	Caribbean Life	Real Goodbar	Real Gone	
Champagne	1 mile	$500,000	1	Belmont Park	Oct 3 2026	U.S.S. Valor	Gaudreau	Club Reign	Earth Song	Johnny Hockey	
Breeders' Futurity	1 1/16 miles	$648,125	1	Keeneland	Oct 3 2026	American History	Coach Pope	Q B Rocket	Title Worthy	Jaded	
American Pharoah	1 1/16 miles	$300,500	1	Santa Anita Park	Oct 3 2026	Hughes	Net Par	Imperial Honor	Domus	Emancipate	
Street Sense	1 1/16 miles	$195,000	3	Churchill Downs	Oct 25 2026	Jas	Staunch	Mystik Bayou	Blessed Flyer	Card Man	
Breeders' Cup Juvenile	1 1/16 miles	$1,760,000	1	Keeneland	Oct 30 2026	Hughes	American History	Salahudin	Coach Pope	Damavand	
Kentucky Jockey Club	1 1/16 miles	$400,000	2	Churchill Downs	Nov 28 2026						
Remsen	1 1/8 miles	$250,000	2	Belmont Park	Dec 5 2026						
Los Alamitos Futurity	1 1/16 miles	$200,000	2	Los Alamitos	Dec 12 2026						
Springboard Mile	1 mile	$300,000	Listed	Remington Park	Dec 19 2026						
Gun Runner Stakes	1 1/16 miles	$100,000	Listed	Fair Grounds	Dec 19 2026						
Smarty Jones	1 mile	$300,000	3	Oaklawn Park	Jan 2 2027						
Leonatus Stakes	1 mile	$125,000	Black-Type	Turfway Park	Jan 16 2027						

=== Select prep events ===
Note: 1st=20 points; 2nd=10 points; 3rd=6 points; 4th=4 points; 5th=2 points

Race	Distance	Purse	Grade	Track	Date	1st	2nd	3rd	4th	5th	Ref
Withers	1 1/16 miles (Note: Withers Stakes run on the Tapeta track surface)	$200,000	Listed	Belmont Park	Jan 16 2027						
Lecomte	1 1/16 miles	$250,000	3	Fair Grounds	Jan 16 2027						
Holy Bull	1 mile	$300,000	3	Gulfstream Park	Jan 30 2027						
Robert B. Lewis	1 mile	$100,000	3	Santa Anita Park	Jan 30 2027						
Southwest	1 1/16 miles	$1,000,000	3	Oaklawn Park	Feb 6 2027						
Sam F. Davis Stakes	1 1/16 miles	$200,000	Listed	Tampa Bay Downs	Feb 6 2027						
Sunland Park Derby	1 1/16 miles	$500,000	Listed	Sunland Park	Feb 14 2027						
John Battaglia Memorial Stakes	1 1/16 miles	$175,000	Listed	Turfway Park	Feb 27 2027						

== Championship series events ==
=== First leg of series ===
Note: 1st=50 points; 2nd=25 points; 3rd=15 points; 4th=10 points; 5th=5 points

Race	Distance	Purse	Grade	Track	Date	1st	2nd	3rd	4th	5th	Ref
Risen Star	1 1/8 miles	$500,000	2	Fair Grounds	Feb 13 2027						
Gotham	1 1/8 miles	$300,000	3	Belmont Park	Feb 20 2027						
Fountain of Youth	1 1/16 miles	$400,000	2	Gulfstream	Feb 27 2027						
Tampa Bay Derby	1 1/16 miles	$350,000	3	Tampa Bay	Mar 6 2027						
San Felipe	1 1/16 miles	$200,000	2	Santa Anita	Mar 6 2027						
Rebel	1 1/16 miles	$1,000,000	2	Oaklawn	Mar 13 2027						
Virginia Derby	1 1/8 miles	$500,000		Colonial Downs	Mar 13 2027						

=== Second leg of series ===
These races are the major preps for the Kentucky Derby, and are thus weighted more heavily.
Note: 1st=100 points; 2nd=50 points; 3rd=25 points; 4th=15 points; 5th=10 points
with the exception of the Lexington Stakes; 1st=20 points; 2nd=10 points; 3rd=6 points; 4th=4 points; 5th=2 points

Race	Distance	Purse	Grade	Track	Date	1st	2nd	3rd	4th	5th	Ref
Jeff Ruby	1 1/8 miles	$700,000	3	Turfway	Mar 20 2027						
Louisiana Derby	1 3/16 miles	$1,000,000	2	Fair Grounds	Mar 20 2027						
Florida Derby	1 1/8 miles	$1,000,000	1	Gulfstream	Mar 27 2027						
Blue Grass Stakes	1 1/8 miles	$1,000,000	1	Keeneland	Apr 3 2027						
Santa Anita Derby	1 1/8 miles	$750,000	1	Santa Anita	Apr 3 2027						
Wood Memorial	1 1/8 miles	$750,000	2	Belmont Park	Apr 3 2027						
Arkansas Derby	1 1/8 miles	$1,500,000	1	Oaklawn Park	Apr 10 2027						
Lexington	1 1/8 miles	$400,000	3	Keeneland	Apr 10 2027						

== Euro/Mideast Road to the Kentucky Derby ==
The Euro/Mideast Road to the Kentucky Derby is designed on a similar basis to the Japan Road and is intended to provide a place in the Derby starting gate to the top two finishers in the series. If the connections of that horse decline the invitation, their place is offered to the second-place finisher and so on. If none of the top four accept, this place in the starting gate reverts to the horses on the main road to the Derby.

The series consists of ten races – In Europe four events run on the turf in late 2026 when the horses are age two, plus two races run on a synthetic surface in early 2027. The last four events are in the Middle East including the Group 2 UAE Derby.

Race	Distance	Track	Date	1st	2nd	3rd	4th	5th	Ref
Royal Lodge Stakes	1 mile	Newmarket	Sep 25 2026	Haffner	Burning Up	Quicken Away	First Law	Quest For Stars	
Beresford Stakes	1 mile	The Curragh	Sep 26 2026	Noble Exhibit	City Of Dubai	Drumbeat	Shakespeare	Tommy Quick	
Prix Jean-Luc Lagardère	1,400 metres (about 7 furlongs)	Longchamp	Oct 4 2026	Amusingly	Folsom Blues	Man's Best Friend	Florida Bay	Aix La Chapelle	
Futurity Trophy	1 mile	Doncaster	Oct 24 2026	Giant Sequoia	Gran Dia	Noble Exhibit	Burning Up	Sergei Diaghilev	
UAE 2000 Guineas	1,600 metres (about 1 mile)	Meydan	Jan 22 2027						
Saudi Derby	1,600 metres (about 1 mile)	King Abdulaziz; Racetrack	Feb 6 2027						
Dubai Road to the Kentucky Derby Stakes	1,900 metres (about 1 3/16 miles)	Meydan	Feb 19 2027						
European Road to the Kentucky Derby; Conditions Stakes	1 mile	Kempton Park	Feb 24 2027						
Patton Stakes	1 mile	Dundalk	Feb 26 2027						
UAE Derby	1,900 metres (about 1 3/16 miles)	Meydan	Mar 27 2027						

Note:

- the four races in 2025 for two-year-olds: 1st=10 points; 2nd=5 points; 3rd=3 points; 4th=2 points; 5th=1 point
- the European Road to the Kentucky Derby Conditions Stakes, Patton Stakes, UAE Two Thousand Guineas, Dubai Road to the Kentucky Derby Stakes: 1st=20 points; 2nd=10 points; 3rd=6 points; 4th=4 points; 5th=2 points
- the Saudi Derby: 1st=30 points; 2nd=15 points; 3rd=9 points; 4th=6 points; 5th=3 points
- the UAE Derby: 1st=100 points; 2nd=50 points; 3rd=25 points; 4th=15 points; 5th=10 points

ƒ Filly

== Japan Road to the Kentucky Derby ==
The Japan Road to the Kentucky Derby is intended to provide a place in the Derby starting gate to the top finisher in the series. If the connections of that horse decline the invitation, their place is offered to the second-place finisher and so on through the top five finishers.

Race	Distance	Track	Date	1st	2nd	3rd	4th	5th	Ref
Cattleya Stakes	1,600 metres (~1 mile)	Tokyo Racecourse	Nov 28 2026						
Zen-Nippon Nisai Yushun	1,600 metres (~1 mile)	Kawasaki Racecourse	Dec 16 2026						
Hyacinth	1,600 metres (~1 mile)	Tokyo Racecourse	Feb 21 2027						
Fukuryu	1,800 metres (~1 1/8 miles)	Nakayama Racecourse	Mar 27 2027						

Note:

ƒ Filly
Cattleya Sho: 1st=10 points; 2nd=5 points; 3rd=3 points; 4th=2 points; 5th=1 point
Zen-Nippon Nisai Yushun: 1st=20 points; 2nd=10 points; 3rd=6 points; 4th=4 points; 5th=2 points
Hyacinth: 1st=30 points; 2nd=15 points; 3rd=9 points; 4th=6 points; 5th=3 points
Fukuyru: 1st=40 points; 2nd=20 points; 3rd=12 points; 4th=8 points; 5th=4 points
