= Best Pal Stakes =

- Class: Grade III
- Location: Del Mar Racetrack; Del Mar, California, United States
- Inaugurated: 1967 (as Balboa Stakes)
- Race type: Thoroughbred - Flat racing
- Website: Del Mar

Race information
- Distance: 6 furlongs
- Surface: dirt
- Track: left-handed
- Qualification: Two-year-olds
- Weight: 123 lbs with allowances
- Purse: $150,000 (2024)

The Best Pal Stakes is a Grade III American Thoroughbred horse race for two-year-olds over a distance of six furlongs on the dirt track scheduled annually in August at Del Mar Racetrack in Del Mar, California. The event currently carries a purse of $150,000.

== History ==
The event was inaugurated on 30 October 1967 as the Balboa Stakes with split divisions on the final day of the Del Mar 62 day racing season which went into the deep autumn. The event was for three-year-olds and older, and held on the turf over a distance of nine furlongs. The name reflected several area locations — Balboa Park near San Diego, Balboa Peninsula up the coast in Newport Beach, and Balboa Avenue in Del Mar which is located adjacent to the Del Mar Fairgrounds — all named in honor of the Spanish explorer Vasco Núñez de Balboa.

The event was not run again until 1972 when conditions changed so that two-year-olds would run over a distance of 7 1/2 furlongs. In 1974, the event was moved to the dirt track and run over a one-mile distance.

In 1983 the event was classified as Grade III and was upgraded to Grade II in 2003.

In 1995 the event was renamed to honor Best Pal, a three time California Horse of the Year who won the Balboa Stakes in 1990 and whose career earnings totaled more than $5.6 million for his owner-breeder, Golden Eagle Farm.

The event has had several distance changes with last being in 2018 when the journey was set at six furlongs.

The event's position in the racing calendar at Del Mar has led to the race being a preparatory race for the Del Mar Futurity, which is scheduled usually several weeks later.

Other notable winners of this event include the 1994 winner Timber Country who went on that year to win the Breeders' Cup Juvenile and was crowned US Champion Two-Year-Old Horse who the following year became the first horse to ever win the Breeders' Cup Juvenile and American Triple Crown Classic Race when he won the 1995 Preakness Stakes. The 2009 winner, Lookin at Lucky, was crowned US Champion Two-Year-Old Horse and the following year also won the 2010 Preakness Stakes. The 2015 winner Nyquist followed up by winning the Del Mar Futurity and the Breeders' Cup Juvenile, along with being crowned the US Champion Two-Year-Old Horse and the following year winning the 2016 Kentucky Derby.

In 2022 the event's classification was downgraded from Grade II to Grade III.

== Records ==
Speed record:

- 6 furlongs: 1:09.19 – Prince of Monaco (2023)
- 6 1/2 furlongs: 1:15.08 – Officer (2001)
- 7 furlongs: 1:22.20 – Best Pal (1990)
- 1 mile: 1:35.40 – Doonesbury (1979) and Roving Boy (1982)

Margins:

- 10 1/4 lengths – Instagrand (2018)

Most wins by a jockey:

- 5 - Alex Solis (1994, 1996, 1997, 1999, 2006)

Most wins by a trainer:

- 13 - Bob Baffert (1998, 2000, 2001, 2002, 2004, 2005, 2009, 2016, 2022, 2023, 2024, 2025, 2026)

Most wins by an owner:

- 3 - Golden Eagle Farm (1990, 1992, 1998)
- 3 - Karl Watson, Michael E. Pegram & Paul Weitman (2009, 2022, 2025)
- 3 - Starlight Racing, Madaket Stables, Stonestreet Stables, Bashor Racing, Determined Stables, Robert E. Masterson, Tom J. Ryan, Waves Edge Capital & Catherine Donovan (2023, 2024, 2026)

Best Pal Stakes – Del Mar Futurity double:

- Diabolo (1974), Visible (1976), Flying Paster (1978), Bold and Gold (1980), Saratoga Six (1984), Best Pal (1990), Worldly Manner (1998), Flame Thrower (2000), Officer (2001), Lookin At Lucky (2009), J P's Gusto (2010), Nyquist (2015), Klimt (2016), Prince of Monaco (2023), Hughes (2026)

== Winners ==
Year	Winner	Jockey	Trainer	Owner	Distance	Time	Purse	Grade	Ref
Best Pal Stakes
2026	Hughes	Juan J. Hernandez	Bob Baffert	Front Row Club, Starlight Racing, Madaket Stables, Stonestreet Stables, Bashor Racing, Albaugh Family Stables, Robert E. Masterson, Golconda Stable, Waves Edge Capital & Catherine Donovan	6 furlongs	1:09.61	$150,000	III	
2025	Desert Gate	Juan J. Hernandez	Bob Baffert	Karl Watson, Michael E. Pegram & Paul Weitman	6 furlongs	1:10.37	$150,000	III	
2024	Getaway Car	Juan J. Hernandez	Bob Baffert	SF Racing, Starlight Racing, Madaket Stables, Stonestreet Stables, Dianne Bashor, Determined Stables, Robert E. Masterson, Tom J. Ryan, Waves Edge Capital & Catherine Donovan	6 furlongs	1:10.73	$147,000	III	
2023	Prince of Monaco	Flavien Prat	Bob Baffert	SF Racing, Starlight Racing, Madaket Stables, Stonestreet Stables, Dianne Bashor, Robert E. Masterson, Waves Edge Capital, Catherine Donovan & Tom Ryan	6 furlongs	1:09.19	$200,000	III	
2022	Havnameltdown	Juan J. Hernandez	Bob Baffert	Karl Watson, Michael E. Pegram & Paul Weitman	6 furlongs	1:10.22	$202,500	III	
2021	Pappacap	Joe Bravo	Mark E. Casse	Rustlewood Farm	6 furlongs	1:11.66	$200,500	II	
2020	Weston	Drayden Van Dyke	Ryan Hanson	Chris Drakos & Ryan Hanson	6 furlongs	1:12.72	$151,000	II	
2019	Collusion Illusion	Joseph Talamo	Mark Glatt	Dan J. Agnew, Rodney E. Orr, Jerry Schneider & John V. Xitco	6 furlongs	1:11.34	$200,351	II	
2018	Instagrand	Drayden Van Dyke	Jerry Hollendorfer	OXO Equine	6 furlongs	1:10.27	$200,000	II	
2017	Run Away	Flavien Prat	Simon Callaghan	Kaleem Shah	6 1/2 furlongs	1:17.91	$201,035	II	
2016	Klimt	Rafael Bejarano	Bob Baffert	Kaleem Shah	6 1/2 furlongs	1:16.11	$200,345	II	
2015	Nyquist	Mario Gutierrez	Doug F. O'Neill	Reddam Racing	6 1/2 furlongs	1:16.84	$200,250	II	
2014	Skyway	Stewart Elliott	Mark E. Casse	John C. Oxley	6 1/2 furlongs	1:16.67	$200,250	II	
2013	Alberts Hope	Alonso Quinonez	Mike Puype	Jaam Racing	6 1/2 furlongs	1:16.71	$150,250	II	
2012	Know More	Garrett K. Gomez	Doug F. O'Neill	Reddam Racing	6 1/2 furlongs	1:16.14	$150,000	II	
2011	Creative Cause	Rafael Bejarano	Mike Harrington	Heinz Steinmann	6 1/2 furlongs	1:15.62	$150,000	II	
2010	J P's Gusto	Pat Valenzuela	David E. Hofmans	Gem Inc.	6 1/2 furlongs	1:16.61	$150,000	II	
2009	Lookin At Lucky	Garrett K. Gomez	Bob Baffert	Michael E. Pegram, Karl Watson & Paul Weitman	6 1/2 furlongs	1:16.06	$150,000	II	
2008	† Azul Leon	Rafael Bejarano	Doug F. O'Neill	Joseph LaCombe Stable	6 1/2 furlongs	1:16.73	$150,000	II	
2007	Salute the Sarge	Michael C. Baze	Eric J. Guillot	Southern Equine Stable	6 1/2 furlongs	1:19.43	$147,000	II	
2006	Principle Secret	Alex O. Solis	Christopher S. Paasch	Charles R. Cono	6 1/2 furlongs	1:16.15	$150,000	II	
2005	What a Song	Victor Espinoza	Bob Baffert	Bob & Beverly Lewis	6 1/2 furlongs	1:15.64	$147,000	II	
2004	Roman Ruler	Corey Nakatani	Bob Baffert	Fog City Stable	6 1/2 furlongs	1:15.93	$147,000	II	
2003	Perfect Moon	Pat Valenzuela	Melvin F. Stute	Annabelle Stute & The Hat Ranch	6 1/2 furlongs	1:16.90	$150,000	II	
2002	Kafwain	Victor Espinoza	Bob Baffert	The Thoroughbred Corporation	6 1/2 furlongs	1:17.00	$150,000	III	
2001	Officer	Victor Espinoza	Bob Baffert	The Thoroughbred Corporation	6 1/2 furlongs	1:15.08	$138,000	III	
2000	Flame Thrower	Corey Nakatani	Bob Baffert	Gary M. Garber	6 1/2 furlongs	1:16.51	$150,000	III	
1999	Dixie Union	Alex O. Solis	Richard E. Mandella	Diamond A Racing Corp. & Herman Sarkowsky	6 1/2 furlongs	1:16.40	$150,000	III	
1998	Worldly Manner	Gary L. Stevens	Bob Baffert	Golden Eagle Farm	6 1/2 furlongs	1:16.60	$109,300	III	
1997	Old Topper	Alex O. Solis	Noble Threewitt	Barbara Hunter	6 1/2 furlongs	1:16.40	$108,825	III	
1996	Swiss Yodeler	Alex O. Solis	Mike Harrington	Heinz Steinmann	6 1/2 furlongs	1:16.00	$105,550	III	
Balboa Stakes
1995	Cobra King	Russell Baze	Mike Puype	Frances B. Biszantz	6 1/2 furlongs	1:15.80	$105,350	III	
1994	Timber Country	Alex O. Solis	D. Wayne Lukas	Overbrook Farm, Gainesway Stable, Robert & Beverly Lewis, et al.	6 1/2 furlongs	1:16.60	$80,325	III	
1993	Creston	Corey Black	Jenine Sahadi	Evergreen Farm	6 1/2 furlongs	1:16.20	$79,650	III	
1992	Devil Diamond	Kent J. Desormeaux	Gary F. Jones	Golden Eagle Farm	7 furlongs	1:22.60	$79,650	III	
1991	Scherando	Francisco Mena	Richard W. Mulhall	Chase Mishkin	7 furlongs	1:22.40	$81,375	III	
1990	Best Pal	Pat Valenzuela	Ian P. D. Jory	Golden Eagle Farm	7 furlongs	1:22.20	$80,325	III	
1989	A. Sir Dancer	Eddie Delahoussaye	Charles M. Marikian	G. Arakelian Farms	7 furlongs	1:23.00	$81,300	III	
1988	Rob an Plunder	Chris McCarron	Craig Anthony Lewis	Diamond Jim, et al.	7 furlongs	1:23.00	$81,800	III	
1987	Purdue King	Chris McCarron	Irv Guiney	John Valpredo	7 furlongs	1:23.20	$65,500	III	
1986	Temperate Sil	Bill Shoemaker	Charles E. Whittingham	Frankfurt Stable	7 furlongs	1:23.00	$54,750	III	
1985	Swear	Eddie Delahoussaye	Willard L. Proctor	Claiborne Farm	1 mile	1:36.60	$55,250	III	
1984	Saratoga Six	Angel Cordero Jr.	D. Wayne Lukas	D. Wayne Lukas, Eaton Farms, L. R. French Jr., Eugene Klein, Mel Hatley, & Samuel Lyon	1 mile	1:36.80	$54,150	III	
1983	Party Leader	Ray Sibille	Gary F. Jones	Elmendorf Farm	1 mile	1:37.20	$54,050	III	
1982	Roving Boy	Eddie Delahoussaye	Joseph Manzi	Robert E. Hibbert	1 mile	1:35.40	$53,150	Listed	
1981	The Captain	Laffit Pincay Jr.	Laz Barrera	Harbor View Farm	1 mile	1:36.80	$44,400	Listed	
1980	Bold and Gold	Dean C. Hall	William A. Reavis	Ted Rexius	1 mile	1:37.40	$38,300	Listed	
1979	Doonesbury	Sandy Hawley	Barney Willis	Fletcher Jones, Sam Roffe & Barney Willis	1 mile	1:35.40	$32,800	Listed	
1978	Flying Paster	Donald Pierce	Gordon C. Campbell	Bernard J. Ridder	1 mile	1:35.60	$33,000	Listed	
1977	Spanish Way	Laffit Pincay Jr.	Laz Barrera	Harbor View Farm	1 mile	1:36.00	$27,950	Listed	
1976	§ Visible	Laffit Pincay Jr.	Vincent Clyne	Elmendorf Farm	1 mile	1:35.80	$22,450	Listed	
1975	Crazy Channon	Donald Pierce	Harold C. McBride	Colvin, Engelson & Nadel	1 mile	1:37.20	$22,700	Listed	
1974	Diabolo	Bill Shoemaker	Sidney Martin	Frank M. McMahon	1 mile	1:35.60	$22,050	Listed	
1973	Battery E.	Wayne Harris	Dennis W. Sparks	Diamond M Ranch	7 1/2 furlongs	1:30.60	$21,750	Listed	
1972	Brave Dance	Fernando Toro	Wayne B. Stucki	J. Kel Houssels	7 1/2 furlongs	1:29.80	$21,625		
1968–1971		Race not held							
1967	Acknowledge	William Harmatz	Gordon C. Campbell	Vicgray Farm	1 1/8 miles	1:49.40	$17,575	‡3YO & older	Division 1
1967	Het's Cadet	Miguel Yanez	Linwood J. Brooks	Wallace F. Zager	1 1/8 miles	1:49.60	$17,575	‡3YO & older	Division 2

Legend:
All Weather Track Dirt Turf
Notes:
‡ The inaugural running of the event in 1967 was for three year olds and older and was split into two divisions. The First Division winner Acknowledge was a six year old. The Second Division winner Het's Cadet was a four year old.
† In the 2008 Kelly Leak was first past the post but caused interference in the straight by drifting in and was disqualified and placed fourth. Azul Leon was declared the winner.
§ Ran as part of an entry

== See also ==
List of American and Canadian Graded races
