= Wilko (horse) =

American-bred Thoroughbred racehorse

- Wilko at Thailand in 2026
- Sire: Awesome Again
- Grandsire: Deputy Minister
- Dam: Native Roots
- Damsire: Indian Ridge
- Sex: Stallion
- Foaled: 2002
- Country: United States
- Colour: Chestnut
- Breeder: Rosendo Parra
- Owner: J. Paul Reddam & Mrs. Susan Roy
- Trainer: Jeremy Noseda
- Record: 29: 3-3-10
- Earnings: $2,435,133

Major wins
- Breeders' Cup Juvenile (2004)
- Last updated on September 9, 2007

Wilko (foaled January 13, 2002 in Kentucky) is a Thoroughbred racehorse who competed in the United Kingdom and in the United States. He is one of four European-trained colts to have won the Breeders' Cup Juvenile.

== Background ==
Wilko was a chestnut horse bred by Rosendo Parra. He was sired by Awesome Again, winner of the 1998 Breeders' Cup Classic, and he was out of the mare, Native Roots. His damsire was the British horse Indian Ridge, a sire of Breeders' Cup Mile winners Domedriver and Ridgewood Pearl, the latter also voted the 1995 European Horse of the Year. Wilko was purchased by Mrs. Susan Roy at the September 2003 Keeneland Sales for $75,000. The colt was sent into training with Jeremy Noseda in the United Kingdom.

== Racing career ==
=== 2004: two-year-old season ===
Susan Roy raced Wilko as a two-year-old in the United Kingdom, where he won two races and had his best result in a stakes race with a second-place finish in the Vintage Stakes to Shamardal who would become that year's European Two-Year-Old Champion. Wilko also ran third in the Superlative, Royal Lodge and Chesham Stakes. At the beginning of October 2004, American businessman J. Paul Reddam purchased a 75% interest in the colt.

Wilko was then sent to the United States to run in the Breeders' Cup Juvenile, held that year at Lone Star Park in Grand Prairie, Texas. Racing on dirt for the first time in his career, Wilko was ridden by British-based jockey Frankie Dettori. The field included the betting favorite Roman Ruler who had won the Best Pal and Norfolk Stakes, plus Afleet Alex who had won the Sanford Stakes and the Grade I Hopeful Stakes. Given little consideration by bettors, Wilko was sent off as a 28-1 long shot but won by a length over Afleet Alex. He was the first British-trained colt to win the race, and the third European after Arazi and Johannesburg.

On his next start, and the last of 2004, he ran third in the Hollywood Futurity behind runner-up Giacomo and winner Declan's Moon who would be voted that year's American Champion Two-Year-Old Colt.

=== Later career ===
In 2005, Wilko made six starts without a win then in 2006 went winless again but finished a solid second to Electrocutionist in the Dubai World Cup. He returned to racing in 2007 but fared poorly and was retired in August. In September, Wilko was acquired by Frank Stronach's Adena Springs breeding operation and will stand at stud at their Ocala, Florida facility where his sire Awesome Again is also located.
