= Brother Derek =

American Thoroughbred racehorse

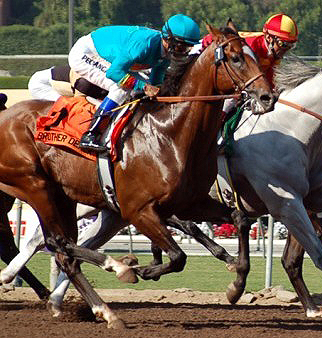
- Sire: Benchmark
- Grandsire: Alydar
- Dam: Miss Soft Sell
- Damsire: Siyah Kalem
- Sex: Stallion
- Foaled: 2003
- Country: United States
- Colour: Bay
- Breeder: Mary H. Caldwell
- Owner: Cecil N. Peacock
- Trainer: Dan L. Hendricks
- Record: 16: 6-1-3
- Earnings: $1,593,458

Major wins
- Norfolk Stakes (2005); Hollywood Futurity (2005); San Rafael Stakes (2006); Santa Catalina Stakes (2006); Santa Anita Derby (2006)

Brother Derek (foaled March 31, 2003 in California) is a thoroughbred horse. He was bred by Mary H. Caldwell and owned by Cecil N. Peacock.

Trained by Dan Hendricks, Brother Derek began racing at age two in California. He won his 2005 debut race as well as the Norfolk Stakes before finishing fourth to winner Stevie Wonderboy in the Breeders' Cup Juvenile.

Family: Son Fred Peacock, grand daughters Lindsay Reiling, Tammy Peacock and Janelle Ivey

== Three-year-old season ==
In 2006, following three straight stakes wins in California including the Grade I Santa Anita Derby, Brother Derek was regarded as a leading contender for the Triple Crown. He was made the pre-race betting favorite for the Kentucky Derby but as a horse who traditionally is a front runner, after drawing the very difficult outside post position #18 his odds dropped sharply. In the Derby, he finished in a dead heat for fourth place with Jazil.

Then two weeks later in the Preakness Stakes in Baltimore, Maryland Brother Derek broke slow and had to be steadied by his jockey Alex Solis after being bumped. Then he checked off the heals of Barbaro and as they passed the stands for the first time, Brother Derek was four lengths back. Going into the club house turn he altered course way out in the five path rushed up to within a head of the leader Like Now down the back stretch in :46-3/5 for a half mile. At the beginning of the final turn eventual runner-up Sweetnorthernsaint passed Brother Derek and then Like Now to take the lead. Brother Derek continued to chase the leaders drifting out four wide on this turn. At the quarter poll Eclipse Award Champion Bernardini passed Brother Derek and the others and to win while Brother Derek faded to fourth earning his second straight check in a classic race, this one for $60,000.

== Four-year-old season ==
In 2007 Brother Derek finished third in both the San Fernando Stakes and the Strub Stakes after which he underwent surgery to have a bone chip removed from an ankle. He did not race again until 2008 but after one start, in late July his owner announced that Brother Derek was being retired from racing and would enter stud in 2009 at Airdrie Stud in Midway, Kentucky.
