= Chief Seattle (disambiguation) =

Chief Seattle (c. 1786–1866) was a Suquamish and Duwamish chief.

Chief Seattle may also refer to:

- Chief Seattle (fireboat), a fireboat
- Chief of the Suquamish – Chief Seattle
- Statue of Chief Seattle
- Chief Seattle, a book by Eva Greenslit Anderson
- "Chief Seattle", a song by jazz saxophonist Chris Potter from the 2007 album Song for Anyone
- A horse that finished second in the 1999 Breeders' Cup Juvenile
