= Ryan Fogelsonger =

American jockey

Personal information
- Born: May 26, 1981 (age 45) Portsmouth, Virginia, United States
- Occupation: Jockey

Horse racing career
- Sport: Horse racing
- Career wins: 1,100+ (ongoing)

Major racing wins
- Sonny Hine Stakes (2002); Challedon Stakes (2002); Federico Tesio Stakes (2003, 2004, 2006); Paumonok Handicap (2003); California Cup Distance Handicap (2003); California Cup Mile (2003); Barbara Fritchie Handicap (2004); Virginia Oaks (2004); Maryland Million Classic (2005); Allaire duPont Distaff Stakes (2005); Safely Kept Breeders' Cup Stakes (2006)

Racing awards
- Eclipse Award for Outstanding Apprentice Jockey (2002)

Significant horses
- Silmaril

Ryan Fogelsonger (born May 26, 1981) is an American jockey in the sport of Thoroughbred horse racing.

Based in Maryland, Fogelsonger began riding in 2002 but was late getting started, earning his first win on May 1 at Pimlico Race Course in Baltimore, Maryland. He immediately became a consistent winner and on September 18 he rode five winners on a ten-race card at Pimlico Race Course then won five races there again on the October 2nd racecard. At the end of the year, he was voted the Eclipse Award for Outstanding Apprentice Jockey.

Fogelsonger appeared on MTV's True Life on an episode titled "I Want the Perfect Body".

== Year-end charts ==
Chart (2002–present)	Peak position
National Earnings List for Jockeys 2002	51
National Earnings List for Jockeys 2003	34
National Earnings List for Jockeys 2004	44
National Earnings List for Jockeys 2005	69
National Earnings List for Jockeys 2006	55
National Earnings List for Jockeys 2007	86
