= Los Alamitos Futurity =

- Class: Grade II
- Location: Los Alamitos Race Course; Cypress, California
- Inaugurated: 1981 (at Hollywood Park Racetrack as Hollywood Futurity)
- Race type: Thoroughbred – Flat racing
- Website: Los Alamitos

Race information
- Distance: 1 1/16 miles
- Surface: Dirt
- Track: left-handed
- Qualification: Two-year-olds
- Weight: 120 lbs.
- Purse: $200,000 (since 2022)

The Los Alamitos Futurity is a Grade II American Thoroughbred horse race for two-year-olds run over a distance of one and one sixteenth miles (8 1/2 furlongs) on the dirt held annually in early December at Los Alamitos Race Course in Cypress, California. The event currently offers a purse of $200,000.

== History ==
The inaugural running of the event was on 29 November 1981 as the Hollywood Futurity and was won by Stalwart whose $365,805 winner's share was one of the largest in the history of American racing.

The event was upgrade to the highest classification of Grade I event in 1983. That year, the race had a total purse of $1,049,725, making it the first million-dollar race for two-year-olds and the richest Thoroughbred horse race at the time.

Between 1985 and 1990 the event was run at a shorter distance of one mile.

With his win in 1987, Tejano became the first two-year-old to achieve career earnings of $1 million.

The 1989 winner Grand Canyon won his fourth straight event and was undefeated winning by 6 1/2 lengths in a fastest time ever set by a two-year-old of 1:33 flat.

In 2006 the event was run on a new synthetic Cushion Track which was installed at Hollywood Park.

In 2007 the race name was changed to the CashCall Futurity under a sponsorship arrangement with the racing stable owner and founder of the CashCall consumer lending company, J. Paul Reddam. Reddam's Slow Down Andy won the 2021 edition of the event.

With the closure of Hollywood Park Racetrack in late 2013 the event was moved to the Los Alamitos Race Course and renamed to the Los Alamitos Futurity and held on the dirt track. The winner of the event in 2014 the 3/5 odds-on favorite Dortmund broke the Los Alamitos track record for the 1 1/16 miles distance.

In 2019 the event was downgraded by the American Graded Stakes Committee to Grade II status.

Six Futurity starters have gone on to win the Kentucky Derby: Gato Del Sol (1982), Ferdinand (1986), Alysheba (1987), Thunder Gulch (1995), Real Quiet (1998), and Giacomo (2005). Preakness winners include Snow Chief (1986), Lookin at Lucky (2010), and Belmont winner A. P. Indy (1992). Real Quiet won the Derby and Preakness and Point Given won the 2001 Preakness & Belmont. Oxbow, who was fourth in the 2012 Futurity, won the Preakness. The race is also regarded as an important preparatory event on the Road to the Kentucky Derby, having produced numerous Triple Crown contenders.

Colts that won this event and went on to take US Champion Two-Year-Old Male Horse honors include Roving Boy (1982), Declan's Moon (2004) and Shared Belief (2013).

Colts that won this event and went later in their careers to take awards include Snow Chief, 1986 US Champion Three-Year-Old Male Horse, A. P. Indy, 1992 US Champion Three-Year-Old Male Horse and US Horse of the Year, Real Quiet, 1999 US Champion Three-Year-Old Male Horse, Point Given, 2001 US Champion Three-Year-Old Male Horse, Lookin at Lucky, 2010 US Champion Three-Year-Old Male Horse. Alysheba finished second to Temperate Sil by a neck in the 1986 Hollywood Futurity but the following year after a sensational season was also honored with US Champion Three-Year-Old Male Horse honors and in 1988 was US Champion Older Dirt Male Horse and US Horse of the Year.

2018 winner Improbable captured US Champion Older Dirt Male Horse honors in 2020. In 1985 Ferdinand finished 3rd to Snow Chief in the event. After an outstanding season as a four-year-old, Ferdinand was voted US Horse of the Year.

US Hall of Fame trainer Bob Baffert has saddled 15 winners in this event, which includes seven winners in row between 2014 and 2020.

== Records ==
Speed records:

- 1 1/16 miles (dirt): 1:40.74 – Afternoon Deelites (1994)
- 1 1/16 miles (synthetic): 1:40.82 – Into Mischief (2007)
- 1 mile: 1:33.00 – Grand Canyon (1989)

Margins:

- 7 1/4 lengths – Mastery (2017)
- 7 lengths - Matty G (1995)

Most wins by a jockey:

- 4 – Alex Solis (1985, 1995, 1996, 2005)
- 4 – Laffit Pincay Jr. (1987, 1992, 1993, 1998)

Most wins by a trainer:

- 15 – Bob Baffert (1997, 1999, 2000, 2008, 2009, 2011, 2014, 2015, 2016, 2017, 2018, 2019, 2020, 2023, 2025)

Most wins by an owner:

- 4 – Michael E. Pegram (1997, 1999, 2009, 2017)

== Winners ==
Year	Winner	Jockey	Trainer	Owner	Distance	Time	Purse	Grade	Ref
At Los Alamitos – Los Alamitos Futurity
2025	Litmus Test	Juan J. Hernandez	Bob Baffert	SF Racing, Starlight Racing, Madaket Stables, Stonestreet Stables, Dianne Bashor, Determined Stables, Golconda Stable, Waves Edge Capital & Catherine Donovan	1 1/16 miles	1:42.38	$200,500	II	
2024	Journalism	Umberto Rispoli	Michael W. McCarthy	Bridlewood Farm, Don Alberto Stable, Eclipse Thoroughbred Partners, Elayne Stables 5 & Robert V. LaPenta	1 1/16 miles	1:43.53	$200,000	II	
2023	Wynstock	Kyle Frey	Bob Baffert	Edward C. Allred & Jack Liebau	1 1/16 miles	1:43.04	$200,000	II	
2022	Practical Move	Ramon A. Vazquez	Tim Yakteen	Pierre J. Amestoy, Leslie A. Amestoy & Roger K. Beasley	1 1/16 miles	1:41.65	$200,000	II	
2021	Slow Down Andy	Mario Gutierrez	Doug O'Neill	Reddam Racing	1 1/16 miles	1:42.33	$300,000	II	
2020	Spielberg	Flavien Prat	Bob Baffert	SF Racing, Starlight Racing, Madaket Stables, Golconda Stables, Siena Farm & Robert E. Masterson	1 1/16 miles	1:43.56	$200,500	II	
2019	Thousand Words	Flavien Prat	Bob Baffert	Albaugh Family Stable, Spendthrift Farm	1 1/16 miles	1:43.19	$200,000	II	
2018	Improbable	Drayden Van Dyke	Bob Baffert	WinStar Farm, China Horse Club & Starlight Racing	1 1/16 miles	1:41.18	$300,345	I	
2017	†McKinzie	Mike E. Smith	Bob Baffert	Karl Watson, Michael E. Pegram, Paul Weitman	1 1/16 miles	1:42.57	$300,000	I	
2016	Mastery	Mike E. Smith	Bob Baffert	Cheyenne Stable	1 1/16 miles	1:41.56	$300,000	I	
2015	Mor Spirit	Gary L. Stevens	Bob Baffert	Michael Lund Petersen	1 1/16 miles	1:43.54	$350,500	I	
2014	Dortmund	Martin Garcia	Bob Baffert	Kaleem Shah	1 1/16 miles	1:40.86	$500,000	I	
At Hollywood Park – CashCall Futurity
2013	Shared Belief	Corey Nakatani	Jerry Hollendorfer	Jungle Racing, Jerry Hollendorfer, George Todaro, Jason Litt & Alex Solis II	1 1/16 miles	1:42.16	$751,500	I	
2012	Violence	Javier Castellano	Todd A. Pletcher	Black Rock Thoroughbreds	1 1/16 miles	1:43.50	$750,000	I	
2011	Liaison	Rafael Bejarano	Bob Baffert	Arnold Zetcher	1 1/16 miles	1:42.86	$750,000	I	
2010	Comma to the Top	Corey Nakatani	Peter L. Miller	Gary Barber, Roger Birnbaum, Kevin Tsujihara	1 1/16 miles	1:44.72	$750,000	I	
2009	Lookin At Lucky	Garrett K. Gomez	Bob Baffert	Karl Watson, Michael E. Pegram & Paul Weitman	1 1/16 miles	1:43.30	$750,000	I	
2008	Pioneerof the Nile	Garrett K. Gomez	Bob Baffert	Zayat Stables	1 1/16 miles	1:41.95	$750,000	I	
2007	Into Mischief	Victor Espinoza	Richard E. Mandella	B. Wayne Hughes	1 1/16 miles	1:40.82	$753,000	I	
Hollywood Futurity
2006	Stormello	Kent J. Desormeaux	William L. Currin	William L. Currin & Alvin Eisman	1 1/16 miles	1:42.19	$441,500	I	
2005	Brother Derek	Alex O. Solis	Dan L. Hendricks	Cecil N. Peacock	1 1/16 miles	1:42.02	$407,250	I	
2004	Declan's Moon	Victor Espinoza	Ronald W. Ellis	Jay Em Ess Stable	1 1/16 miles	1:41.63	$446,500	I	
2003	Lion Heart	Mike E. Smith	Patrick L. Biancone	Derrick Smith & Michael B. Tabor	1 1/16 miles	1:42.80	$376,000	I	
2002	Toccet	Jorge F. Chavez	John F. Scanlan	Daniel M. Borislow	1 1/16 miles	1:41.26	$406,500	I	
2001	Siphonic	Jerry D. Bailey	David E. Hofmans	Amerman Racing Stables	1 1/16 miles	1:42.09	$456,750	I	
2000	Point Given	Gary L. Stevens	Bob Baffert	The Thoroughbred Corporation	1 1/16 miles	1:42.21	$333,690	I	
1999	Captain Steve	Robby Albarado	Bob Baffert	Michael E. Pegram	1 1/16 miles	1:43.27	$419,000	I	
1998	Tactical Cat	Laffit Pincay Jr.	D. Wayne Lukas	Overbrook Farm	1 1/16 miles	1:42.63	$393,000	I	
1997	Real Quiet	Kent J. Desormeaux	Bob Baffert	Michael E. Pegram	1 1/16 miles	1:41.34	$470,200	I	
1996	Swiss Yodeler	Alex O. Solis	Mike Harrington	Heinz J. Steinmann	1 1/16 miles	1:42.70	$580,850	I	
1995	Matty G	Alex O. Solis	Ron McAnally	Double J Farm	1 1/16 miles	1:41.75	$500,000	I	
1994	Afternoon Deelites	Kent J. Desormeaux	Richard E. Mandella	Burt Bacharach	1 1/16 miles	1:40.74	$500,000	I	
1993	Valiant Nature	Laffit Pincay Jr.	Ron McAnally	V H W Stable	1 1/16 miles	1:40.78	$500,000	I	
1992	River Special	Laffit Pincay Jr.	Robert B. Hess Jr.	Golden Eagle Farm	1 1/16 miles	1:43.27	$500,000	I	
1991	A.P. Indy	Eddie Delahoussaye	Neil D. Drysdale	Tomonori Tsurumaki	1 1/16 miles	1:42.85	$599,600	I	
1990	§Best Pal	Jose A. Santos	Ian P. D. Jory	Golden Eagle Farm	1 mile	1:35.40	$1,000,000	I	
1989	Grand Canyon	Angel Cordero Jr.	D. Wayne Lukas	Overbrook Farm	1 mile	1:33.00	$1,000,000	I	
1988	King Glorious	Chris McCarron	Jerry Hollendorfer	Four M Stable & Halo Farms	1 mile	1:35.60	$1,000,000	I	
1987	Tejano	Laffit Pincay Jr.	D. Wayne Lukas	Lloyd R. French Jr.	1 mile	1:34.60	$1,000,000	I	
1986	Temperate Sil	Bill Shoemaker	Charles E. Whittingham	Frankfurt Stables & Charles E. Whittingham	1 mile	1:36.10	$1,000,000	I	
1985	Snow Chief	Alex O. Solis	Melvin F. Stute	Carl Grinstead & Ben Rochelle	1 mile	1:34.20	$1,172,000	I	
1984	Stephan's Odyssey	Eddie Maple	Woodford C. Stephens	Henryk de Kwiatkowski	1 1/16 miles	1:43.40	$1,140,000	I	
1983	Fali Time	Sandy Hawley	Gary F. Jones	James Mamakos & Mark Stubrin	1 1/16 miles	1:41.60	$1,049,725	I	
1982	Roving Boy	Eddie Delahoussaye	Joseph Manzi	Robert E. Hibbert	1 1/16 miles	1:41.80	$811,400		
1981	Stalwart	Chris McCarron	D. Wayne Lukas	Marvin L. Warner & John C. Oxley	1 1/16 miles	1:47.80	$715,100		

Legend:
All Weather Track Dirt
Notes:
§ Ran as an entry
† In the 2017 running of the event Solomini finished was first past the finishing line but was disqualified and placed third for interference in the deep stretch drive and placed third. McKinzie was declared the winner and Instilled Regard placed second.

== See also ==
- List of American and Canadian Graded races
- Road to the Kentucky Derby
