= Best Pal =

American-bred Thoroughbred racehorse

- Sire: Habitony
- Grandsire: Habitat
- Dam: Ubetshedid
- Damsire: King Pellinore
- Sex: Gelding
- Foaled: February 12, 1988
- Country: United States
- Colour: Brown
- Breeder: John & Betty Mabee
- Owner: Golden Eagle Farm
- Trainer: Gary F. Jones
- Record: 47: 18-11-4
- Earnings: $5,668,245

Major wins
- Hollywood Futurity (1990); Del Mar Futurity (1990); Norfolk Stakes (1990); Balboa Stakes (1990); Pacific Classic Stakes (1991); Swaps Stakes (1991); Santa Anita Handicap (1992); Charles H. Strub Stakes (1992); Oaklawn Handicap (1992); San Fernando Stakes (1992); Hollywood Gold Cup (1993); California Cup Classic (1993); Native Diver Handicap (1994); San Antonio Handicap (1995)

Awards
- California Horse of the Year (1990, 1991, 1992)

Honours
- United States Racing Hall of Fame inductee (2010); Best Pal Stakes at Del Mar Racetrack

Best Pal (February 12, 1988 – November 24, 1998) was an American Hall of Fame champion racehorse, who retired with the all-time record for purses (since surpassed) of any California-bred, earning for his owners, the Golden Eagle Farm, US$5.6 million over his lifetime.

== Background ==
Best Pal was a brown gelding bred by John & Betty Mabee. Best Pal was a descendant of Princequillo on both his sire's and dam's line. He was gelded at an early age due to being "studdish and unmanageable".

== Racing career ==
Best Pal won the first running of the Pacific Classic at Del Mar, and finished second in the 1991 Kentucky Derby. He won the Hollywood Gold Cup and the Santa Anita Handicap, thus capturing all three of California's premier handicap races. In all, Best Pal won 18 races—17 of them stakes—nearly all in California.

== Retirement ==
Retired in 1996, Best Pal had a massive heart attack while on his way to a training track at Golden Eagle Farm. He was buried at the farm, and a large boulder with a plaque covers his grave. Best Pal was voted into the National Museum of Racing and Hall of Fame in 2010.

== Pedigree ==
Pedigree of Best Pal (USA), bay gelding, 1988
Sire Habitony (IRE) 1974	Habitat (USA); 1966	Sir Gaylord	Turn-To
Sire Habitony (IRE) 1974	Habitat (USA); 1966	Sir Gaylord	Somethingroyal
Sire Habitony (IRE) 1974	Habitat (USA); 1966	Little Hut	Occupy
Sire Habitony (IRE) 1974	Habitat (USA); 1966	Little Hut	Savage Beauty
Sire Habitony (IRE) 1974	Courteous Lady (USA); 1960	Gallant Man	Migoli
Sire Habitony (IRE) 1974	Courteous Lady (USA); 1960	Gallant Man	Majideh
Sire Habitony (IRE) 1974	Courteous Lady (USA); 1960	Fleurlea	Bull Lea
Sire Habitony (IRE) 1974	Courteous Lady (USA); 1960	Fleurlea	Blue Lily
Dam Ubetshedid (USA) 1980	King Pellinore (USA); 1972	Round Table	Princequillo
Dam Ubetshedid (USA) 1980	King Pellinore (USA); 1972	Round Table	Knights Daughter
Dam Ubetshedid (USA) 1980	King Pellinore (USA); 1972	Thong	Nantallah
Dam Ubetshedid (USA) 1980	King Pellinore (USA); 1972	Thong	Rough Shod
Dam Ubetshedid (USA) 1980	Ubetido (USA); 1975	Sir Wiggle	Sadair
Dam Ubetshedid (USA) 1980	Ubetido (USA); 1975	Sir Wiggle	Wiggle
Dam Ubetshedid (USA) 1980	Ubetido (USA); 1975	Udontmeanit	Gray Phantom
Dam Ubetshedid (USA) 1980	Ubetido (USA); 1975	Udontmeanit	Lady Bourbon (Family:2-h)
