= Roving Boy =

American-bred Thoroughbred racehorse

- Sire: Olden Times
- Grandsire: Relic
- Dam: Black Eyed Lucy
- Damsire: Prince Royal
- Sex: Stallion
- Foaled: 1980
- Country: United States
- Colour: Bay
- Breeder: Robert E. Hibbert
- Owner: Robert E. Hibbert
- Record: 9: 6-2-0
- Earnings: $843,675

Major wins
- Del Mar Futurity (1982); Hollywood Futurity (1982); Balboa Stakes (1982); Norfolk Stakes (1982); Alibhai Handicap (1983)

Awards
- American Champion Two-Year-Old Colt (1982)
- Last updated on August 15, 2008

Roving Boy (1980–1983) was an American Champion Thoroughbred racehorse. Bred and raced by Robert E. Hibbert, Roving Boy was a descendant of Man o' War on his sire's side. His dam's grandsire was the undefeated Italian racing superstar, Ribot.

Trained by Joseph Manzi, Roving Boy was the dominant juvenile in California whose earnings in 1982 of $800,425 set a world record for a two-year-old. He was a winner of four important West Coast races including the Grade I Norfolk Stakes at Santa Anita Park and both the Del Mar and Hollywood Futuritys. His 1982 performances earned Roving Boy U.S. Champion Two-Year-Old Colt honors.

A winterbook favorite for the 1983 U.S. Triple Crown series, in late January 1983 Roving Boy suffered a cannon-bone fracture in his left front leg that kept him out of racing until the fall. Upon his return to the racetrack, Roving Boy won the Alibhai Handicap at Santa Anita but, similar to what happened to Eight Belles in the 2008 Kentucky Derby, after crossing the finish line he broke both hind legs. Surgery was not successful and the colt had to be euthanized.
