= Anees (horse) =

American-bred Thoroughbred racehorse

- Sire: Unbridled
- Grandsire: Fappiano
- Dam: Ivory Idol
- Damsire: Alydar
- Sex: Stallion
- Foaled: 1997
- Country: United States
- Colour: Brown
- Breeder: Farfellow Farms
- Owner: The Thoroughbred Corp.
- Trainer: Alex L. Hassinger, Jr.
- Record: 7: 2-0-2
- Earnings: $699,200

Major wins
- Breeders' Cup Juvenile (1999)

Awards
- American Champion Two-Year-Old Colt (1999)
- Last updated on October 6, 2007

Anees (1997–2003) was an American Thoroughbred racehorse. In 1999 he was voted American Champion Two-Year-Old Colt after winning the Breeders' Cup Juvenile.

== Background ==
Bred by Kip and Suzanne Knelman's Farfellow Farms near Paris, Kentucky, he was out of the unraced mare Ivory Idol, a daughter of U.S. Racing Hall of Fame inductee, Alydar. He was sired by Unbridled, the 1990 American Champion Three-Year-Old Male Horse who won the Kentucky Derby and the Breeders' Cup Classic. He was acquired by The Thoroughbred Corp., the racing stable owned by Prince Ahmed bin Salman of Saudi Arabia and named for the 19th century Indian poet Mir Babar Ali Anis. Anees was trained by Alex Hassinger, Jr.

== Racing career ==
Anees and sent to the track in 1999 at age two. Of his four starts he notably won a maiden race and finished third behind winner Dixie Union and runner-up Forest Camp in the Norfolk Stakes at Santa Anita Park. A late developer, the colt had matured considerably by the time he was entered in November's Breeders' Cup Juvenile. Up against thirteen colts that included the two who had beaten him in the Norfolk Stakes, Anees was sent off by pari-mutuel bettors at odds of 30:1. Under jockey Gary Stevens, Anees put on a powerful show of running, coming from last to first in winning the Juvenile by 2½ lengths. His performance was sufficient to earn him the 1999 Eclipse Award for American Champion Two-Year-Old Colt.

Sent back to the track at age three, Anees finished thirteenth behind winner Fusaichi Pegasus in the 2000 Kentucky Derby. Of his three starts that year, his best result was a third-place finish in the early spring to winner Fusaichi Pegasus in the San Felipe Stakes.

== Stud record ==
Anees was retired to stud duty at Mill Ridge Farm near Lexington, Kentucky in 2000. There, Anees sired a number of horses and appeared to have excellent stallion potential until a paddock accident on March 31, 2003. Anees fractured his left front pastern and underwent emergency surgery at the renowned Hagyard Equine Medical Institute. The operation left him in a body sling with a full cast on his left pastern that went all the way up to the shoulder. The extensive efforts to save him came to naught and Anees had to be euthanized on April 5, 2003.
