= Del Mar Futurity =

Annual California horse race

- Class: Grade I
- Location: Del Mar Racetrack; Del Mar, California, United States
- Inaugurated: 1948
- Race type: Thoroughbred – Flat racing

Race information
- Distance: 7 furlongs
- Surface: Dirt
- Track: left-handed
- Qualification: Two-year-olds
- Weight: Colts & Geldings, 123 lbs. Fillies, 120 lbs. Allowances
- Purse: $300,000 since 2012

The Del Mar Futurity is a seven-furlong American Thoroughbred horse race held annually at Del Mar Racetrack in Del Mar, California. A Grade I event since 2007, the race is open to two-year-old horses and offers a purse of $300,000.

In 1971, it was run in two divisions on Turf. From 2007 to 2014, it was run on Polytrack synthetic dirt.

Bob Baffert has trained a record 14 horses to wins in the race, including seven straight from 1996 to 2002 and four straight from 2021 to 2024.

== Records ==
Speed record:

- 1:20.99 – Cave Rock (2022) (Dirt)
- 1:21.48 – American Pharoah (2014) (Polytrack)

Most wins by a jockey:

- 6 – Bill Shoemaker (1954, 1958, 1971–1974)

Most wins by a trainer:

- 20 - Bob Baffert (1996–2002, 2008, 2009, 2011, 2012, 2014, 2016, 2018, 2021, 2022, 2023, 2024, 2025, 2026)

Most wins by an owner:

- 5 – Golden Eagle Farm (1990, 1992, 1993, 1997, 1998)

== Winners ==
| Year | Winner | Jockey | Trainer | Owner | Time |
|---|---|---|---|---|---|
| 2026 | Hughes | Juan J. Hernandez | Bob Baffert | Front Row Club, Starlight Racing, Madaket Stables, Stonestreet Stables, Bashor Racing, Albaugh Family Racing, Robert E. Masterson, Golconda Stable, Waves Edge Capital and Catherine Donovan | 1:22.57 |
| 2025 | Brant | Flavien Prat | Bob Baffert | Zedan Racing Stables, Inc. | 1:21.92 |
| 2024 | Gaming | Flavien Prat | Bob Baffert | Karl Watson, Michael E. Pegram & Paul Weitman | 1:23.02 |
| 2023 | Prince of Monaco | Flavien Prat | Bob Baffert | SF Racing, Starlight Racing, Madaket Stables, Stonestreet Stables, Dianne Bashor, Robert E. Masterson, Waves Edge Capital, Catherine Donovan and Tom Ryan | 1:22.65 |
| 2022 | Cave Rock | Juan Hernandez | Bob Baffert | Karl Watson, Michael E. Pegram & Paul Weitman | 1:20.99 |
| 2021 | Pinehurst | Mike E. Smith | Bob Baffert | SF Racing, Starlight Racing, Madaket Stables, Robert E. Masterson, Stonestreet Stables, Jay Schoenfarber, Waves Edge Capital and Donovan Farm | 1:23.55 |
| 2020 | Dr. Schivel | Flavien Prat | Luis Mendez | Red Baron's Barn LLC, Rancho Temescal LLC Et Al | 1:24.16 |
| 2019 | Nucky | Norberto Arroyo Jr. | Peter Miller | Rockingham Ranch | 1:25.52 |
| 2018 | Game Winner | Mario Gutierrez | Bob Baffert | Gary & Mary West | 1:23.18 |
| 2017 | Bolt d'Oro | Corey Nakatani | Mick Ruis | Ruis Racing | 1:22.91 |
| 2016 | Klimt | Rafael Bejarano | Bob Baffert | Kaleem Shah | 1:21.80 |
| 2015 | Nyquist | Mario Gutierrez | Doug F. O'Neill | Reddam Racing | 1:23.28 |
| 2014 | American Pharoah | Victor Espinoza | Bob Baffert | Zayat Stables | 1:21.48 |
| 2013 | Tamarando | Julien Leparoux | Jerry Hollendorfer | Mr. & Mrs. Larry Williams | 1:23.07 |
| 2012 | Rolling Fog | Rafael Bejarano | Bob Baffert | Arnold Zetcher LLC | 1:22.96 |
| 2011 | Drill | Martin Garcia | Bob Baffert | Mike Pegram, Karl Watson, Paul Weitman | 1:22.16 |
| 2010 | J P's Gusto | Patrick Valenzuela | David Hofmans | Gem Stable | 1:22.95 |
| 2009 | Lookin at Lucky | Garrett Gomez | Bob Baffert | Mike Pegram, Karl Watson, Paul Weitman | 1:22.85 |
| 2008 | Midshipman | Tyler Baze | Bob Baffert | Stonerside Stable | 1:23.35 |
| 2007 | Georgie Boy | Garrett K. Gomez | Kathy Walsh | George Schwary | 1:25.34 |
| 2006 | Horse Greeley | Victor Espinoza | Richard Mandella | Ray & Martha Parfet | 1:22.93 |
| 2005 | Stevie Wonderboy | Garrett Gomez | Doug O'Neill | Merv Griffin | 1:22.43 |
| 2004 | Declan's Moon | Victor Espinoza | Ronald W. Ellis | Mace & Samantha Siegel | 1:21.29 |
| 2003 | Siphonizer | Julie Krone | Richard Mandella | B. Wayne Hughes | 1:23.10 |
| 2002 | Icecoldbeeratreds | David Flores | Bob Baffert | Mike Pegram | 1:22.94 |
| 2001 | Officer | Victor Espinoza | Bob Baffert | The Thoroughbred Corp. | 1:22.33 |
| 2000 | Flame Thrower | Jerry Bailey | Bob Baffert | Gary Garber | 1:22.00 |
| 1999 | Forest Camp | David Flores | Bob Baffert | Aaron U. Jones | 1:21.67 |
| 1998 | Worldly Manner | Kent Desormeaux | Bob Baffert | Golden Eagle Farm | 1:23.05 |
| 1997 | Souvenir Copy | Chris McCarron | Bob Baffert | Golden Eagle Farm | 1:23.10 |
| 1996 | Silver Charm | David Flores | Bob Baffert | Bob & Beverly Lewis | 1:22.88 |
| 1995 | Future Quest | Kent Desormeaux | Ron McAnally | VHW Stables | 1:22.81 |
| 1994 | On Target | Alex Solis | Ron McAnally | VHW Stables | 1:22.37 |
| 1993 | Winning Pact | Corey Nakatani | Gary F. Jones | Golden Eagle Farm | 1:22.04 |
| 1992 | River Special | Chris McCarron | Robert Hess Jr. | Golden Eagle Farm | 1:36.64 |
| 1991 | Bertrando | Alex Solis | Bruce Headley | Gus Headley | 1:36.45 |
| 1990 | Best Pal | Pat Valenzuela | Ian Jory | Golden Eagle Farm | 1:35.40 |
| 1989 | Drag Race | Frank Olivares | Steve Miyadi | Kazumasa Yano | 1:35.40 |
| 1988 | Music Merci | Chris McCarron | Craig A. Lewis | Royal T. Stable/Pendleton | 1:35.40 |
| 1987 | Lost Kitty | Laffit Pincay Jr. | D. Wayne Lukas | Klein & Lukas | 1:36.20 |
| 1986 | Qualify | Gary Stevens | Laz Barrera | Ethel D. Jacobs | 1:35.60 |
| 1985 | Tasso | Laffit Pincay Jr. | Neil Drysdale | G. Robins/Waldemar Farms | 1:36.00 |
| 1984 | Saratoga Six | Ángel Cordero Jr. | D. Wayne Lukas | French/Klein/Lyon | 1:36.00 |
| 1983 | Althea | Laffit Pincay Jr. | D. Wayne Lukas | D. Aykroyd/H. Alexander | 1:34.80 |
| 1982 | Roving Boy | Ed Delahoussaye | Joseph Manzi | Robert E. Hibbert | 1:38.80 |
| 1981 | Gato Del Sol | Ed Delahoussaye | Edwin J. Gregson | A. Hancock III/L. Peters | 1:37.40 |
| 1980 | Bold and Gold | Dean Hall | Willis A. Reavis | Ted Rexius | 1:36.20 |
| 1979 | The Carpenter | Chris McCarron | Willard L. Proctor | Cardiff Stud Farm | 1:35.20 |
| 1978 | Flying Paster | Don Pierce | Gordon C. Campbell | Bernard J. Ridder | 1:34.80 |
| 1977 | Go West Young Man | Frank Olivares | Loren Rettele | Wild Plum Farm | 1:35.60 |
| 1976 | Visible | Laffit Pincay Jr. | Vincent Clyne | Elmendorf | 1:35.60 |
| 1975 | Telly's Pop | Francisco Mena | Melvin F. Stute | H. Koch & T. Savalas | 1:36.00 |
| 1974 | Diabolo | Bill Shoemaker | Sidney Martin | Frank M. McMahon | 1:35.40 |
| 1973 | Such A Rush | Bill Shoemaker | Dale Landers | Hubert J. Miller | 1:29.80 |
| 1972 | Groshawk | Bill Shoemaker | Charlie Whittingham | M/M Quinn Martin | 1:28.60 |
| 1971 | MacArthur Park | Bill Shoemaker | Tommy Doyle | Mark III Stable | 1:29.00 |
| 1971 | D.B. Carm | Fernando Toro | John G. Canty | M/M S. N. Simmons | 1:29.00 |
| 1970 | June Darling | William Mahorney | Warren Stute | Clement L. Hirsch | 1:08.80 |
| 1969 | George Lewis | Bill Hartack | Buster Millerick | Alan Magerman | 1:08.20 |
| 1968 | Fleet Allied | Jerry Lambert | Harold C. McBride | M/M Vincent Kanowsky | 1:08.20 |
| 1967 | Baffle | Walter Blum | Johnny Longden | Frank M. McMahon | 1:09.60 |
| 1966 | Ruken | Fernando Alvarez | Clyde Turk | Louis R. Rowan | 1:09.60 |
| 1965 | Coursing | Kenneth Church | Clyde Turk | Louis R. Rowan | 1:08.80 |
| 1964 | Terry's Secret | Alex Maese | Carl A. Roles | Poltex Stable | 1:10.20 |
| 1963 | Perris | Alex Maese | Carl A. Roles | M/M Mel M. Burns | 1:09.40 |
| 1962 | Slipped Disc | Roy Yaka | Max H. Britt | W. E. Britt | 1:09.80 |
| 1961 | Weldy | Raymond York | Frank E. Childs | M/M Fred Turner Jr. | 1:09.20 |
| 1960 | Short Jacket | Ralph Neves | Hurst Philpot | Middle Ranch | 1:09.00 |
| 1959 | Azure's Orphan | Eddie Burns | Paul Meredith | M/M L. F. Saunders | 1:09.60 |
| 1958 | Tomy Lee | Bill Shoemaker | Frank E. Childs | M/M Fred Turner Jr. | 1:09.20 |
| 1957 | Old Pueblo | Eddie Arcaro | Robert L. Wheeler | Jelks & P. McBean | 1:09.00 |
| 1956 | Swirling Abbey | Don Lewis | Reggie Cornell | T. Ross/P. Klipstein | 1:08.80 |
| 1955 | Blen Host | Raymond York | Bob R. Roberts | Wilson et al. | 1:10.60 |
| 1954 | Blue Ruler | Bill Shoemaker | William Finnegan | Murcain Stable | 1:09.80 |
| 1953 | Double Speed | Joe Phillippi | Monte S. Parke | Fannie Hertz | 1:10.40 |
| 1952 | Hour Regards | Euclid LeBlanc | C. Ralph West | Archie J. Sneed | 1:09.80 |
| 1951 | Big Noise | Ralph Neves | Hack Ross | Harry James/Betty Grable | 1:10.40 |
| 1950 | Patch | Johnny Longden | Walter W. Taylor | J. Thomas Taylor | 1:10.60 |
| 1949 | Your Host | Frank Chojnacki | Harry L. Daniels | William Goetz | 1:10.40 |
| 1948 | Star Fiddle | Hubert Trent | Edward H. Wright | White Star Stable | 1:11.80 |
