= Midshipman (horse) =

American-bred Thoroughbred racehorse

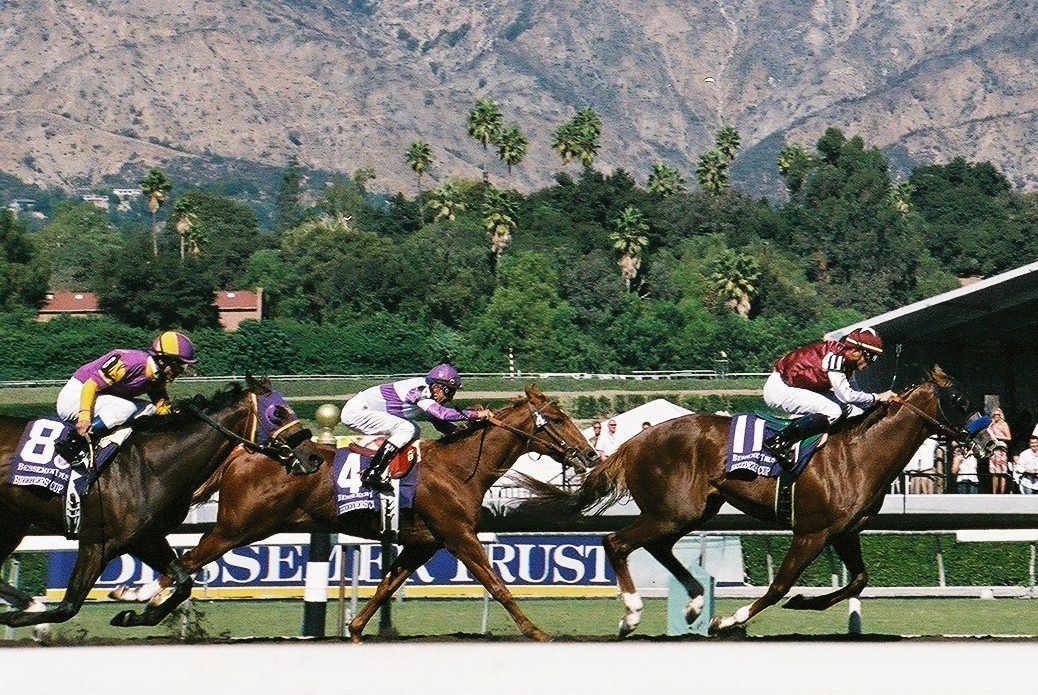
- Midshipman wins the 2008 BC Juvenile
- Sire: Unbridled's Song
- Grandsire: Unbridled
- Dam: Fleet Lady
- Damsire: Avenue of Flags
- Sex: Stallion
- Foaled: 2006
- Country: United States
- Colour: Chestnut
- Breeder: Stonerside Stable
- Owner: Godolphin Racing
- Trainer: Bob Baffert (2008); Saeed bin Suroor (2009)
- Record: 8: 5-1-1
- Earnings: $1,409,600

Major wins
- Del Mar Futurity (2008) Breeders' Cup wins: Breeders' Cup Juvenile (2008)

Awards
- American Champion Two-Year-Old Colt for 2008

Midshipman (foaled March 26, 2006, in Kentucky) is an American Thoroughbred racehorse.

Owned by Stonerside Stable and trained by Hall of Famer Bob Baffert, as a two-year-old Midshipman won 3 of 4 starts, including the Breeders' Cup Juvenile and Del Mar Futurity.

Two weeks before his run in the Breeders' Cup, Midshipman was sold to Darley Stable and as part of the sales agreement was transferred to trainer Saeed bin Suroor after the race.

The colt was a leading contender for the 2009 Triple Crown but fell off due to a 'soft tissue injury.'

Midshipman made his 3-year-old debut in an allowance optional claiming race on September 18 at Belmont Park, which marked his first start on traditional dirt. He won by 3 1/2 lengths over co-favorite Just Ben.

Midshipman also ran in 2009's Breeders' Cup Dirt Mile, where he finished 3rd to the longest shot in the race, Farthest Land.

== Race record ==
Date	Track	Race	Distance	Finish
8/17/2008	Del Mar	Maiden	5 1/2 furlongs	1
9/3/2008	Del Mar	Del Mar Futurity	7 furlongs	1
9/28/2008	Santa Anita Park	Norfolk Stakes	1 1/16 miles	2
10/25/2008	Santa Anita Park	Breeders' Cup Juvenile	1 1/16 miles	1
9/18/2009	Belmont Park	Allowance	6 1/2 furlongs	1
11/7/2009	Santa Anita Park	Breeders' Cup Dirt Mile	1 mile	3
1/28/2010	Meydan Racecourse	Maktoum Challenge (Round 1)	1 mile	4
2/25/2010	Meydan Racecourse	Meydan Metropolis	7 furlongs	1
