= California Cup Distance Handicap =

American Thoroughbred horse race

- Thoroughbred – Flat
- Location: Santa Anita Park, Arcadia, California
- Date: Autumn (during Oak Tree Racing Association meet)
- Distance: 1¼ miles (10 furlongs)
- Conditions: Fillies and mares, three years old and up, bred in California
- Surface: Turf

The California Cup Distance Handicap is an American Thoroughbred horse race run annually during the autumn Oak Tree Racing Association meet at Santa Anita Park in Arcadia, California. The race covers a distance of 1¼ miles on turf, and is open to fillies and mares at least three years old and bred in the state of California. The event winnings currently include a purse of $100,000 and a trophy.

The California Cup Distance Handicap is part of the "California Cup Day" series of races, intended to call attention to and honor the California Thoroughbred racing and breeding industry.

== Past winners ==
- 2008 – Distant Victory (Victor Espinoza)
- 2007 – Imagine (Corey Nakatani)
- 2006 – Special Heather
- 2005 – Moscow Burning
- 2004 – Test The Waters
- 2003 – Moscow Burning
- 2002 – Nicole's Pursuit

(Moscow Burning is the all-time leading earner among Cal-bred females and a two-time winner of the California Cup Distance Handicap.)
