= Corniche (horse) =

American racehorse

- Sire: Quality Road
- Grandsire: Elusive Quality
- Dam: Wasted Tears
- Damsire: Najran
- Sex: Stallion
- Foaled: 17 February 2019 (age 6)
- Country: United States
- Colour: Bay
- Breeder: Bart Evans & Stonehaven Steadings
- Owner: Speedway Stables
- Trainer: Bob Baffert (2021); Todd A. Pletcher (2022– )
- Record: 4: 3-0-0
- Earnings: $1,263,500

Major wins
- American Pharoah Stakes (2021); Breeders' Cup; Breeders' Cup Juvenile (2021)

Awards
- American Champion Two-Year-Old Male Horse (2021)
- Last updated on 1 August 2022

Corniche (foaled February 17, 2019) is a retired Champion American thoroughbred racehorse who, as a two-year-old, won the American Pharoah Stakes and Breeders' Cup Juvenile.

== Background ==
Corniche is a bay stallion that was bred in Kentucky by Bart Evans and Stonehaven Steadings. His sire is Quality Road and his dam is Wasted Tears who was sired by Najran. He is the second black-type horse out of his dam, a multiple graded stakes winner who excelled in routes on turf. Her first black-type performer is the stakes-placed Coffee Crush (by Medaglia d'Oro), who died in 2019. All six of the dam's foals to start are winners.

Initially, Corniche was placed in the 2020 Keeneland Association September Yearling Sale but his reserve price of $350,000 was not met. Later he was bought for $1,500,000 by Speedway Stables, a partnership of Peter Fluor and Kane C. Weiner at the 2021 Ocala Breeders' Sales Spring Sale of Two-Year-Olds in Training. Corniche was trained by Bob Baffert and his jockey is Mike E. Smith in 2021. However, his owners sent the colt to trainer Todd Pletcher in 2022 after Bob Baffert was suspended.

== Racing career ==
=== 2021: two-year-old season ===
Corniche began his career on 4 September 2021 at Del Mar Racetrack in a Maiden Special Weight event for two-year-olds over a distance of 5 1/2 furlongs facing nine other first-starters. As the 1/2 favorite, he drew the outside barrier, crossed over from the wide barrier, took the lead throughout with Mike E. Smith giving an energetic hand ride inside the last furlong, and drew off to win by 4 1/2 lengths in a time of 1:03.01.

Bob Baffert then entered Corniche in the Grade I American Pharoah Stakes at Santa Anita Park over a distance of one and one-sixteenth miles. On 1 October 2021, Corniche was sent off as the 2/5 favorite against six other entrants, took control early from the inside draw, led to the far turn when stablemate Rockefeller pursued into the straight bend, and drew away under Mike E. Smith's strong handling to defeat Pappacap by 3 1/4 lengths in a time of 1:44.75. Smith commented after the race, "There's just so much upside to this horse. This is what's really exciting about him. When he broke his maiden as impressive as he did, he just gave me that feeling that we weren't even close to his full potential ... He's a big colt and he carries a lot of flesh. As he starts to get even fitter and harder inside, he's gonna be a force to reckon with." By winning the American Pharoah Stakes, Corniche qualified to the Breeders' Cup since the event is a "Win and You're In" race for the GI Breeders' Cup Juvenile.

On 5 November 2021, Corniche started as the 7/5 favorite in the GI Breeders' Cup Juvenile at Del Mar Racetrack. Facing ten other entrants, he showed his usual speed to jump out in front. In the straight, Corniche dug in, winning by 1 3/4 lengths in a time of 1:42.50. Jockey Mike E. Smith won his 27th Breeders' Cup victory and third in the Breeders' Cup Juvenile while trainer Bob Baffert won his 18th Breeders' Cup event and fifth Breeders' Cup Juvenile. However, Corniche did not receive any qualification points for the Road to the Kentucky Derby since his trainer Bob Baffert is suspended by Churchill Downs Inc. through 2023.

=== 2022: three-year-old season ===
Corniche was given time off after his two-year-old campaign. He didn't prepare for training until mid-April at the WinStar Farm in Kentucky and missed the Triple Crown. With his original trainer, Bob Baffert, facing a suspension at NYRA tracks, his owners opted to send the colt to trainer Todd Pletcher for a New York campaign at Saratoga. Corniche made his first start in the Grade 2 Amsterdam Stakes on July 31. He started as the 8/5 favorite and stumbled at the start, recovering inwards while brushing Runninsonofagun. Then he chased four then three wide just off the top pair under coaxing from the half-mile pole, faded through the turn, went four wide into upper stretch, folded, and was eased home to finish last in the nine-horse field. Pletcher said, "He didn't get away cleanly and found himself in a position he's never been in before." Through his jockey Luis Saez, Pletcher said, "When he came to the three-eighths pole, he kind of came off the bridle. We'll scope him and see if anything is revealed, but it's disappointing." It was found that Corniche shed the frog on his right front foot in the event, which likely was the cause of his last-place finish. Pletcher said that the injury would need time to heal on its own before a protective plate could be placed on it and training could resume. After a month, it was announced on 28 August that Corniche was retired and would stand at Ashland Stud in 2023.

== Statistics ==
Date	Distance	Race	Grade	Track	Odds	Field	Finish	Winning Time	Winning (Losing) Margin	Jockey	Ref
2021 – two-year-old season
Sep 4, 2021	5 1/2 furlongs	Maiden		Del Mar	0.50*	10	1	1:03.01	4 1/2 lengths	Mike E. Smith	
Oct 1, 2021	1 1/16 miles	American Pharoah Stakes	I	Santa Anita	0.40*	7	1	1:44.75	3 1/4 lengths	Mike E. Smith	
Nov 5, 2021	1 1/16 miles	Breeders' Cup Juvenile	I	Del Mar	1.40*	11	1	1:42.50	1 1/4 lengths	Mike E. Smith	
2022 – three-year-old season
Jul 31, 2022	6 1/2 furlongs	Amsterdam Stakes	II	Saratoga	1.65*	9	9	1:15.75	(33 1/4 lengths)	Luis Saez	

Notes:
An (*) asterisk after the odds means Corniche was the post-time favourite.

== Pedigree ==
Pedigree of Corniche, bay colt, 17 February 2019
Sire Quality Road 2006	Elusive Quality; 1993	Gone West; 1984	Mr. Prospector 1970
Sire Quality Road 2006	Elusive Quality; 1993	Gone West; 1984	Secrettame 1978
Sire Quality Road 2006	Elusive Quality; 1993	Touch of Greatness; 1986	Hero's Honor 1980
Sire Quality Road 2006	Elusive Quality; 1993	Touch of Greatness; 1986	Ivory Wand 1973
Sire Quality Road 2006	Kobla; 1995	Strawberry Road (AUS); 1979	Whiskey Road 1972
Sire Quality Road 2006	Kobla; 1995	Strawberry Road (AUS); 1979	Giftisa (NZ) 1974
Sire Quality Road 2006	Kobla; 1995	Winglet; 1988	Alydar 1975
Sire Quality Road 2006	Kobla; 1995	Winglet; 1988	Highest Trump 1972
Dam Wasted Tears 2005	Najran; 1999	Runaway Groom (Canada); 1979	Blushing Groom (FR) 1974
Dam Wasted Tears 2005	Najran; 1999	Runaway Groom (Canada); 1979	Yonnie Girl 1966
Dam Wasted Tears 2005	Najran; 1999	Line Command; 1995	Capote 1984
Dam Wasted Tears 2005	Najran; 1999	Line Command; 1995	Circle Command 1990
Dam Wasted Tears 2005	Wishes and Roses; 1991	Greinton (GB); 1981	Green Dancer 1972
Dam Wasted Tears 2005	Wishes and Roses; 1991	Greinton (GB); 1981	Crystal Queen (GB) 1976
Dam Wasted Tears 2005	Wishes and Roses; 1991	Anniversary Wish; 1985	Beau's Eagle 1976
Dam Wasted Tears 2005	Wishes and Roses; 1991	Anniversary Wish; 1985	Dinner Music 1976 (family 1-x)
