= Hughes (horse) =

American racehorse

- Sire: Into Mischief
- Grandsire: Harlan's Holiday
- Dam: K P Dreamin'
- Damsire: Union Rags
- Sex: Colt
- Foaled: February 23, 2024; Kentucky, U.S.
- Country: United States
- Color: Bay
- Breeder: Breffni Farm
- Owner: Front Row Club, Starlight Racing, Madaket Stables, Stonestreet Stables, Bashor Racing, Albaugh Family Stables, Robert E. Masterson, Golconda Stable, Waves Edge Capital & Catherine Donovan
- Trainer: Bob Baffert
- Record: 5: 5 - 0 - 0
- Earnings: $1,520,000

Major wins
- Best Pal Stakes (2026); Del Mar Futurity (2026); American Pharoah Stakes (2026); Breeders' Cup Juvenile (2026)

Hughes (foaled February 23, 2024) is an undefeated multiple Grade I–winning American Thoroughbred racehorse who won the Grade I American Pharoah Stakes, Del Mar Futurity, and Breeders' Cup Juvenile as a two-year-old.

== Background ==
Hughes is a bay colt that was bred in Kentucky by Breffni Farm.

Hughes's sire is Into Mischief, a Grade I winner at the age of two who has been North America's leading sire by purse winnings in multiple years since 2018. Into Mischief stood the 2026 season for a fee of $250,000 at Spendthrift Farm near Lexington.

His dam K P Dreamin, ran third in the 2019 Grade I Chandelier Stakes (G1) and Grade I Starlet Stakes in California. Many in Hughes' pedigree did some or all of their racing in California, including the Baffert-trained 2001 Horse of the Year Point Given, sire of second dam Litigating including Go Between, a full brother to Litigating and winner of the 2008 Grade I Pacific Classic Stakes.

Hughes was bought for US$675,000 at the 2025 Keeneland September yearling sales for Front Row Club, Starlight Racing, Madaket Stables, Stonestreet Stables, Bashor Racing, Albaugh Family Stables, Robert E. Masterson, Golconda Stable, Waves Edge Capital, and Catherine Donovan by agent Donato Lanni on consignment from Blandford Stud.

Owner Tom Ryan from Front Row Club indicated that his name was inspired by the tenacity that ice hockey playerJack Hughes showed while leading America to Olympic gold in hockey earlier in 2026. Ryan said after Hughes won his debut June 21 at Los Alamitos Race Course. "I also have a personal connection to the name Hughes. My wife's father, Pat Hughes, won three Stanley Cups, and Into Mischief was the brainchild of B. Wayne Hughes."

Hughes is trained by US Hall of Fame trainer Bob Baffert.

== Racing career ==
=== 2026: two-year-old season ===
Hughes began his career on August 8 at Los Alamitos Racetrack in a Maiden Special Weight event for two-year-olds over a distance of five furlongs facing five other first-starters. Hughes started as the 3/5 odds-on favorite and moved to the front battling High Pronto from the start and setting the pace up the backstretch. He kicked clear midstretch extending his lead by jockey Joel Rosario winning easily by six lengths in a time of 57.22 seconds.

In his second start on August 8, trainer Bob Baffert entered Hughes in the Grade III Best Pal Stakes at Del Mar over a distance of six furlongs. Hughes broke like a well at the start of and was quickly challenged from the outside by Kennyten, second choice in the field of five. At the top of the stretch, Kennyten produced one last burst, then watched as Hughes and jockey Juan Hernandez race away through a final furlong in :11.74 to win by 7 3/4 lengths in a time of 1:09.61.

Hughes 's next start was on September 10 in the Grade I Del Mar Futurity at Del Mar over a distance of seven furlongs. Hughes raced between High Pronto and Domus down the long backstretch straightaway and into the far turn before one peeled away and then the other. Jockey Juan Hernandez took full command in the final stages to draw off by 4 3/4 lengths in a time 1:22.57. The Hall of Fame trainer Bob Baffert won his 20th Del Mar Futurity.

With such a commanding performance Bob Baffert entered Hughes in the Grade I American Pharoah Stakes at Santa Anita Park over a distance of one and one-sixteenth miles. On October 3, 2026, Hughes was sent off as the 3/10 odds-on faced five other entrants including three other Bob Baffert trainees. Net Par took the early lead and did his best to hold on, getting away with the first quarter-mile in :23.37 and a half-mile in :46.86. Juan Hernandez let Hughes settle into third, swung him three wide to make his bid on the second turn, and took the lead at the quarter pole. Hughes increased his margin to six lengths at the wire winning in a time of 1:43.22. By winning the American Pharoah Stakes, Hughes qualified to the GI Breeders' Cup Juvenile.

In the Breeders' Cup Juvenile, Hughes took on a field of 6 rivals in his first start outside of California at Keeneland in Kentucky, going off as an odds-on favorite at a touch over 4/5. Getting to the front quickly, he vied for the early lead and pressed the front-running Damavand the whole way, seizing the lead three-eighths of a mile from the finish. He then repelled the charge of Coach Pope, the runner up of the Breeders' Futurity held earlier in the month at Keeneland, and pulled away from the field to win by 2 1/4 lengths on the wire in a final time of 1:42.27 for the 1 1/16 mile race. With five wins, four consecutive graded stakes wins, and three straight GI victories, Hughes is a heavy favorite to win the Eclipse Award for American Champion Two-Year-Old Male Horse. If he does eventually do so, he will be his sire, Into Mischief's third consecutive winner of the award.

== Statistics ==
Date	Distance	Race	Grade	Track	Odds	Field	Finish	Winning Time	Winning (Losing) Margin	Jockey	Ref
2026 – two-year-old season
Jun 6, 2026	5 furlongs	Maiden Special Weight		Los Alamitos	0.60*	6	1	0.57.22	6 lengths	Joel Rosario	
Aug 8, 2026	6 furlongs	Best Pal Stakes	III	Del Mar	1.50*	5	1	1:09.61	7 3/4 lengths	Juan Hernandez	
Sep 6, 2026	7 furlongs	Del Mar Futurity	I	Del Mar	0.20*	5	1	1:22.57	4 3/4 lengths	Juan Hernandez	
Oct 3, 2026	1 1/16 miles	American Pharoah Stakes	I	Santa Anita	0.30*	6	1	1:43.22	6 lengths	Juan Hernandez	
Oct 30, 2026	1 1/16 miles	Breeders' Cup Juvenile	I	Keeneland	0.82*	6	1	1:42.27	2 1/4 lengths	Flavien Prat	

Notes:
An (*) asterisk after the odds means Hughes was the post-time favourite.

== Pedigree ==
Pedigree of Hughes, Bay Colt, February 23, 2024
Sire Into Mischief (2005)	Harlan's Holiday (1999)	Harlan (1989)	Storm Cat (1983)
Sire Into Mischief (2005)	Harlan's Holiday (1999)	Harlan (1989)	Country Romance (1976)
Sire Into Mischief (2005)	Harlan's Holiday (1999)	Christmas in Aiken (1992)	Affirmed (1975)
Sire Into Mischief (2005)	Harlan's Holiday (1999)	Christmas in Aiken (1992)	Dowager (1980)
Sire Into Mischief (2005)	Leslie's Lady (1996)	Tricky Creek (1986)	Clever Trick (1976)
Sire Into Mischief (2005)	Leslie's Lady (1996)	Tricky Creek (1986)	Battle Creek Girl (1977)
Sire Into Mischief (2005)	Leslie's Lady (1996)	Crystal Lady (1990)	Stop the Music (1970)
Sire Into Mischief (2005)	Leslie's Lady (1996)	Crystal Lady (1990)	One Last Bird (1980)
Dam K P Dreamin (2017)	Union Rags (2009)	Dixie Union (1997)	Dixieland Band (1980)
Dam K P Dreamin (2017)	Union Rags (2009)	Dixie Union (1997)	She's Tops (1989)
Dam K P Dreamin (2017)	Union Rags (2009)	Tempo (1992)	Gone West (1984)
Dam K P Dreamin (2017)	Union Rags (2009)	Tempo (1992)	Terpsichorist (1975)
Dam K P Dreamin (2017)	Litigating (2008)	Point Given (1997)	Thunder Gulch (1992)
Dam K P Dreamin (2017)	Litigating (2008)	Point Given (1997)	Turko's Turn (1992)
Dam K P Dreamin (2017)	Litigating (2008)	Mediation (IRE) (1992)	Caerleon (1980)
Dam K P Dreamin (2017)	Litigating (2008)	Mediation (IRE) (1992)	Redeem Herself (1982) (Family: 9-e)
