= Victor Espinoza =

Mexican jockey (born 1972)

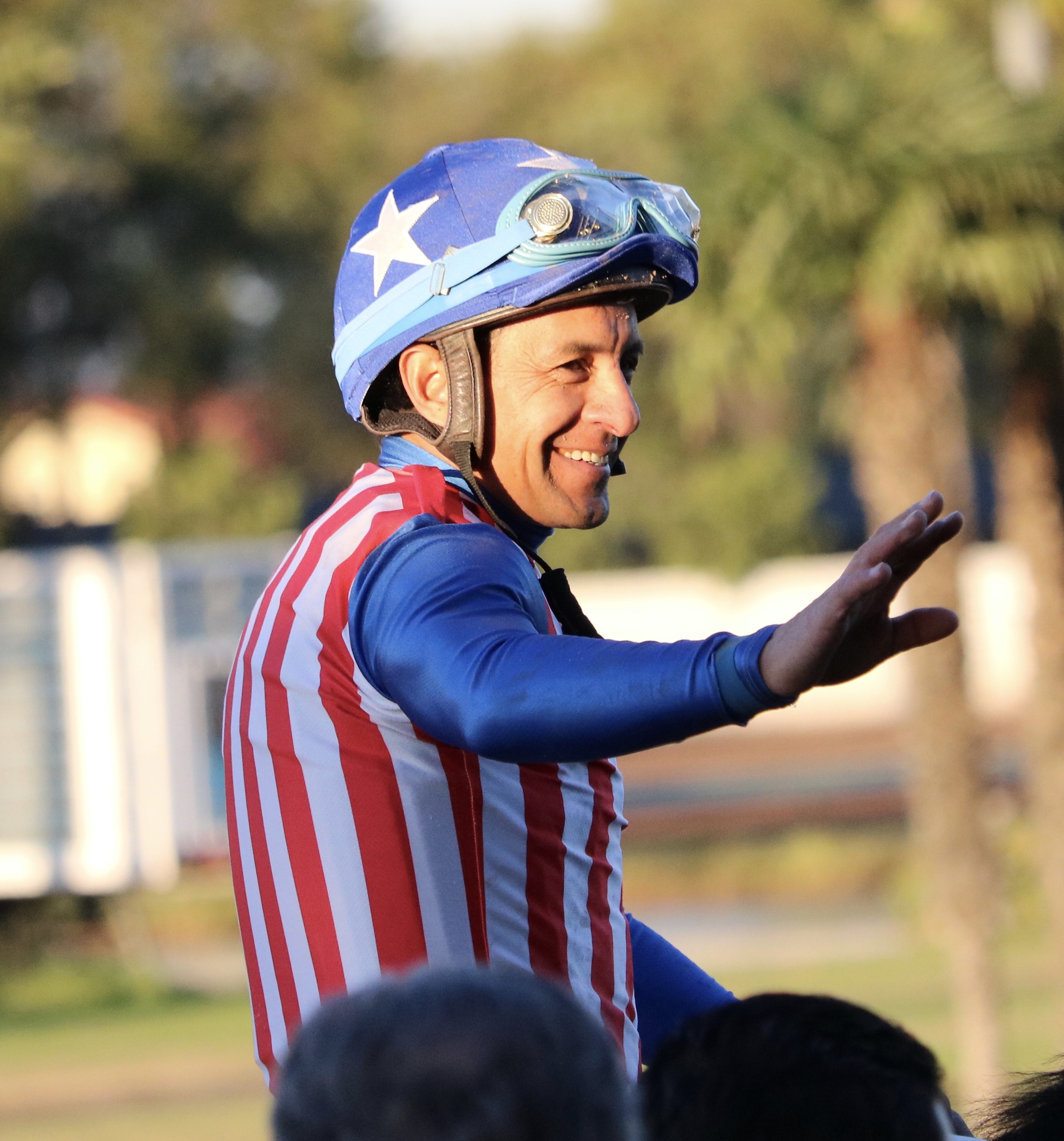
- Victor Espinoza in 2016

Personal information
- Born: August 24, 1972 (age 53) Tulancingo, Hidalgo, Mexico
- Occupation: Jockey

Horse racing career
- Sport: Horse racing
- Career wins: 3,200+ (ongoing)

Major racing wins
- Moccasin Stakes (1996, 2000); Shadwell Turf Mile Stakes (1999); Hollywood Gold Cup (2000, 2015); Del Mar Breeders' Cup Handicap (2000, 2001, 2004); Del Mar Futurity (2001, 2004, 2006, 2014); Sham Stakes (2001, 2005, 2006, 2017); Wood Memorial Stakes (2001); Providencia Stakes (2001, 2008, 2009); Haskell Invitational Handicap (2002, 2015); San Diego Handicap (2003, 2004, 2005, 2013, 2016, 2017); Delta Jackpot Stakes (2004); Hawthorne Handicap (2004, 2005); Pimlico Special (2004); Sunshine Millions Classic (2004); Thunder Road Handicap (2004, 2006, 2015); Hawthorne Gold Cup Handicap (2005); Arlington Million (2006); CashCall Mile Invitational Stakes (2006); C. L. Hirsch Memorial Turf Championship (2006); Gamely Stakes (2006, 2015); Lane's End Breeders' Futurity (2006); WinStar Derby (2006, 2007); Las Flores Handicap (2006, 2008); La Cañada Stakes (2001, 2007, 2014); San Felipe Stakes (2007, 2014); Sunland Park Oaks (2006, 2007, 2009, 2015); A Gleam Invitational Handicap (2003, 2006, 2007, 2010); Potrero Grande Breeders' Cup Handicap (2008); California Cup Distance Handicap (2008); Tuzla Handicap (2008); Hollywood Derby (2009, 2014); Lazaro Barrera Memorial Stakes (2010); Del Mar Handicap (2011, 2013); Santa Anita Derby (2011, 2014, 2017); FrontRunner Stakes (2014, 2016); Arkansas Derby (2015); Rebel Stakes (2015); Remington Springboard Mile Stakes (2017) American Classics wins Kentucky Derby (2002, 2014, 2015); Preakness Stakes (2002, 2014, 2015); Belmont Stakes (2015); United States Triple Crown (2015) Breeders' Cup wins Breeders' Cup Distaff (2000); Breeders' Cup Juvenile Fillies (2014); Breeders' Cup Classic (2015); Breeders' Cup Filly & Mare Sprint (2021); International wins Dubai Golden Shaheen (2015); Windsor Castle Stakes (UK, 2014); Dubai World Cup (2016)

Racing awards
- ESPY Award for Best Jockey (2002, 2014, 2015); George Woolf Memorial Jockey Award (2016)

Honors
- National Museum of Racing and Hall of Fame (2017)

Significant horses
- War Emblem, Peace Rules, Behaving Badly, California Chrome, Congaree; Declan's Moon, The Tin Man, American Pharoah, Bob and John, Secret Circle, Take Charge Brandi, Stellar Wind, Gormley, Bolt d'Oro
- Updated on Apr. 11, 2018

Victor Espinoza (born May 23, 1972) is a Mexican jockey in American Thoroughbred horse racing who won the Triple Crown in 2015 on American Pharoah. He began riding in his native Mexico and went on to compete at racetracks in California. He has won the Kentucky Derby three times, riding War Emblem in 2002, California Chrome in 2014, and American Pharoah in 2015. He also won the Preakness Stakes three times, in those same years and with the same horses. He was the first jockey in history to enter the Belmont Stakes with a third opportunity to win the Triple Crown; his 2015 victory made him the oldest jockey and first Hispanic jockey to accomplish the feat. He joined Ron Turcotte as the only jockeys to win five of the six jewels of the Triple Crown spread over two consecutive years.

== Background and early career ==
Espinoza was born on a dairy farm in Hidalgo, Mexico, the eleventh of twelve children. He and his brother Jose L. Espinoza, his senior by three years, rode horses on the farm; when he was 15 he left home and traveled to Cancún to assist his brother as a Quarter Horse trainer. He paid for jockey school by driving a bus in Mexico City at age 17. Within a few years, Espinoza was racing Thoroughbreds at Mexico City's track, Hipódromo de las Américas.

Espinoza did not speak English when he came to the United States in 1990. He moved to Northern California in 1992, where by 1994 he was the leading apprentice rider at the Bay Meadows and Golden Gate Fields racetracks. At the Bay area tracks, he started out very poor and lived in a tack room at the stables. Espinoza was described as "just a hardworking kid who was out there every day...But he kept getting better and better, and soon people started seeing the talent he had."

A year later, he moved to Los Angeles. His big break came in 2000 when he won the Breeders' Cup Distaff aboard Spain. He rode his first Kentucky Derby in 2001, placing third on Congaree, and in 2002, he won both the Kentucky Derby and the Preakness Stakes atop War Emblem. Between 2000 and 2006 he averaged 193 wins a year and twice finished third in total earnings among jockeys. However, his career entered a slump until he decided to refocus. As he explained, "One day, I woke up and I said 'This is not how I'm going to end up my career." He hired a new agent in January 2013, Brian Beach, and with a change in motivation went on to obtain his 3,000th career win, aboard Flashy Delight, on May 31, 2013, at Betfair Hollywood Park in Inglewood, California. After winning the 2014 Kentucky Derby and Preakness Stakes on California Chrome, in June 2014 Espinoza traveled to Britain to win the Windsor Castle Stakes at the Royal Ascot meeting on the Wesley A. Ward-trained colt Hootenanny.

== California Chrome and American Pharoah ==
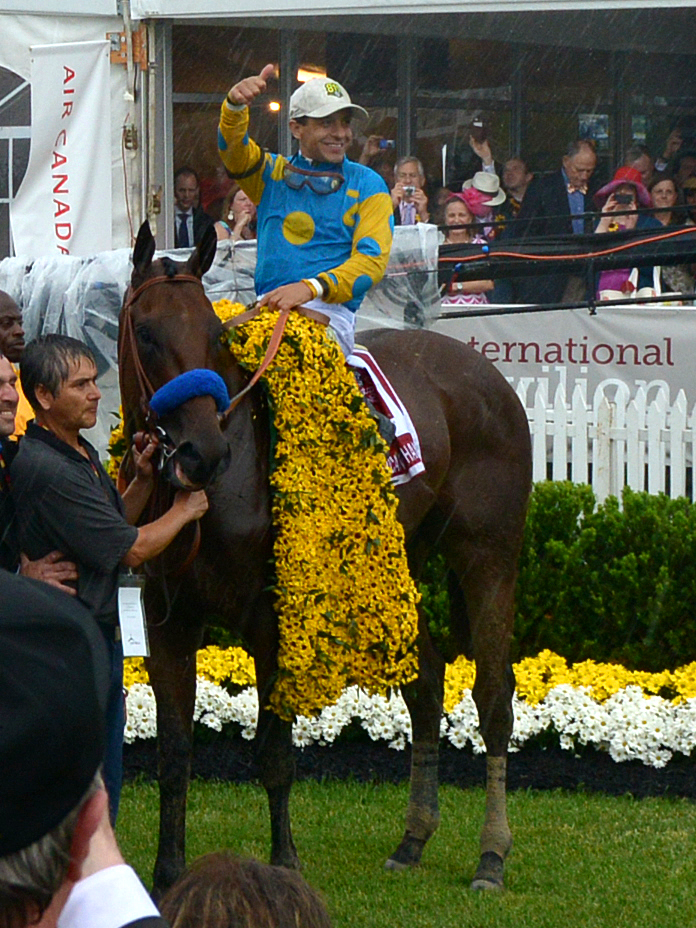
American Pharoah with Victor Espinoza up

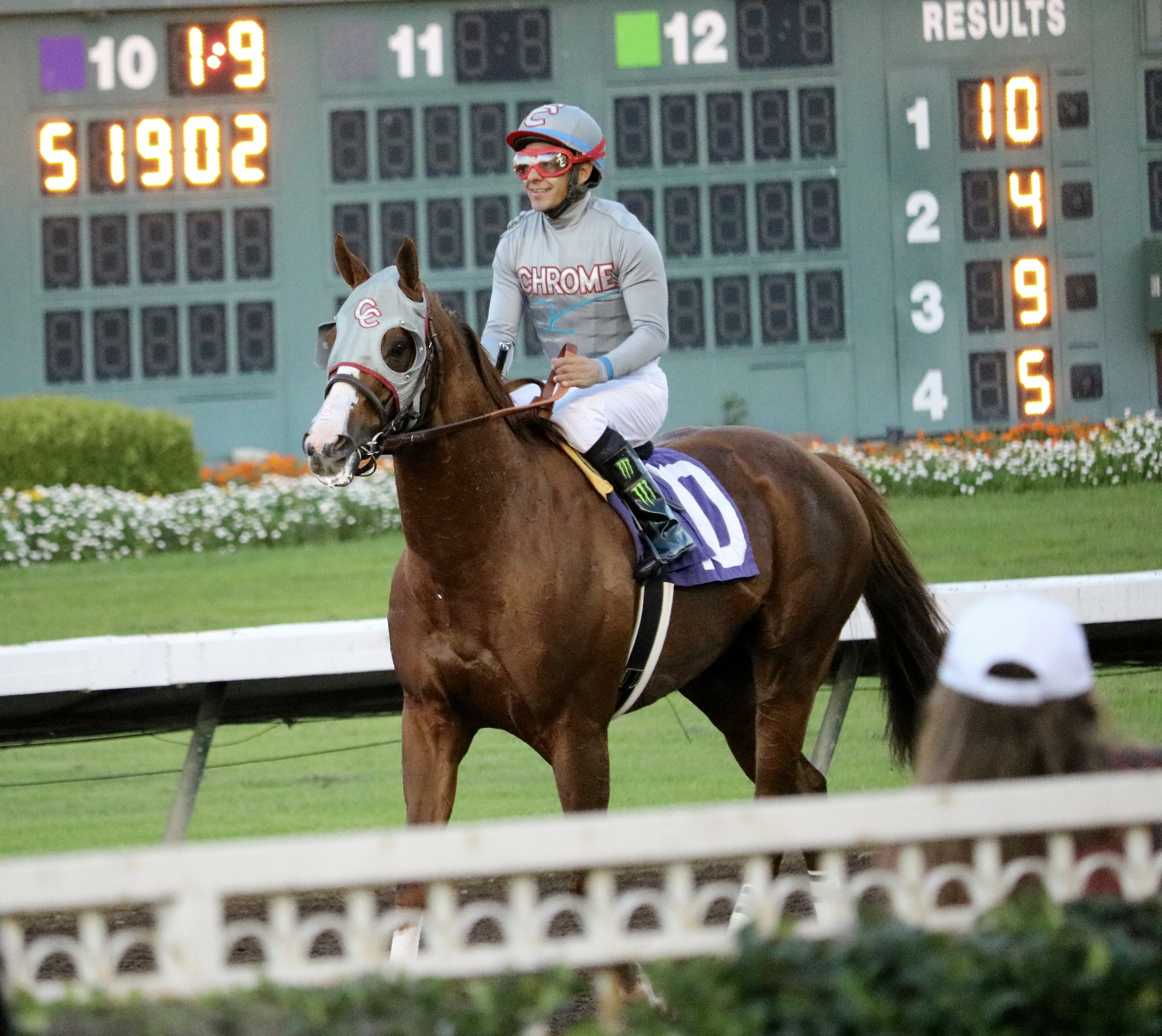
Espinoza on California Chrome after winning the 2016 Winter Challenge Stakes at Los Alamitos

Espinoza became the first jockey in history to get three opportunities to win the Triple Crown and earned back-to-back wins with California Chrome and American Pharoah in both the Kentucky Derby and Preakness Stakes, only the sixth jockey in history to do so.

In December 2013 Espinoza was selected as the jockey for California Chrome by veteran horse trainer Art Sherman, who had used him as a jockey during Espinoza's years in Northern California. Up to that point, California Chrome had won only 2 of his 6 starts. Espinoza rode California Chrome to consecutive victories in the King Glorious Stakes on December 22, the California Cup Derby on January 25, 2014, the San Felipe Stakes on March 8, and the Santa Anita Derby on April 5. On May 3, 2014, Espinoza lengthened the winning streak as he rode California Chrome to victory in the Kentucky Derby, marking the jockey's second Kentucky Derby win. On May 17, California Chrome placed first in the Preakness Stakes, also Espinoza's second Preakness win. On June 7, Espinoza's 6 for 6 streak aboard California Chrome came to an end when, due to an injury sustained right out of the starting gate, the Triple Crown contender finished in a dead heat for fourth place in the Belmont Stakes.

In the fall of 2014, Espinoza also became the regular rider of American Pharoah, trained by Bob Baffert and owned by Ahmed Zayat. Espinoza started with the colt's second race, the Grade I Del Mar Futurity on September 4. The pair went on to win the FrontRunner Stakes. The colt was scratched from the Breeders' Cup Juvenile, but the pair reunited in 2015 with wins in the Rebel Stakes and Arkansas Derby. American Pharoah and Espinoza then won the 2015 Kentucky Derby. After the win, Espinoza said, "I feel like the luckiest Mexican on Earth." However, his performance attracted some scrutiny as he struck the horse 32 times with his whip during the race. Kentucky racing stewards reviewed Espinoza's ride and ruled that his whip use did not violate state regulations. On May 16, 2015, Espinoza and American Pharoah won the 2015 Preakness Stakes on a sloppy track, setting up Espinoza's third attempt at the Triple Crown. His June 6, 2015, victory at the 2015 Belmont Stakes made him the oldest jockey to win the Triple Crown, as well as the first Latino jockey to do so. For 3 years, he held the distinction of being the last jockey, and the oldest, to sweep the Triple Crown until Mike Smith did it aboard Justify in 2018. On October 31, 2015, Espinoza rode American Pharoah to victory in the Breeder's Cup Classic, becoming the first jockey in history to win horse racing's Grand Slam—the Triple Crown and the Breeder's Cup Classic.

== Other ventures ==
On August 25, 2015, it was announced that Espinoza would compete on the 21st season of Dancing with the Stars. He was paired with professional dancer Karina Smirnoff. The couple was eliminated on Week 2 of competition and finished in 12th place.

== Accident ==
On July 22, 2018, Espinoza was injured when riding Bobby Abu Dhabi at the Del Mar racetrack. Espinoza suffered a fractured vertebra but was initially expected to make a full recovery. Several weeks after the accident, he continued to have trouble shaving, walking and getting out of bed, and lacked feeling in his left arm. On January 5, 2019, Espinoza returned to riding at the Santa Anita Park.

== Personal life ==
Espinoza is single and has no children. He donates ten percent of his winnings to the City of Hope to support pediatric cancer research. Following his Triple Crown win, he announced that he would be donating 100% of his Belmont Stakes earnings to the City of Hope. Espinoza has a nephew, Assael Espinoza, who is following in his uncle's footsteps and is an apprentice jockey who is riding at Santa Anita Park, in Arcadia, California.

== Year-end charts ==
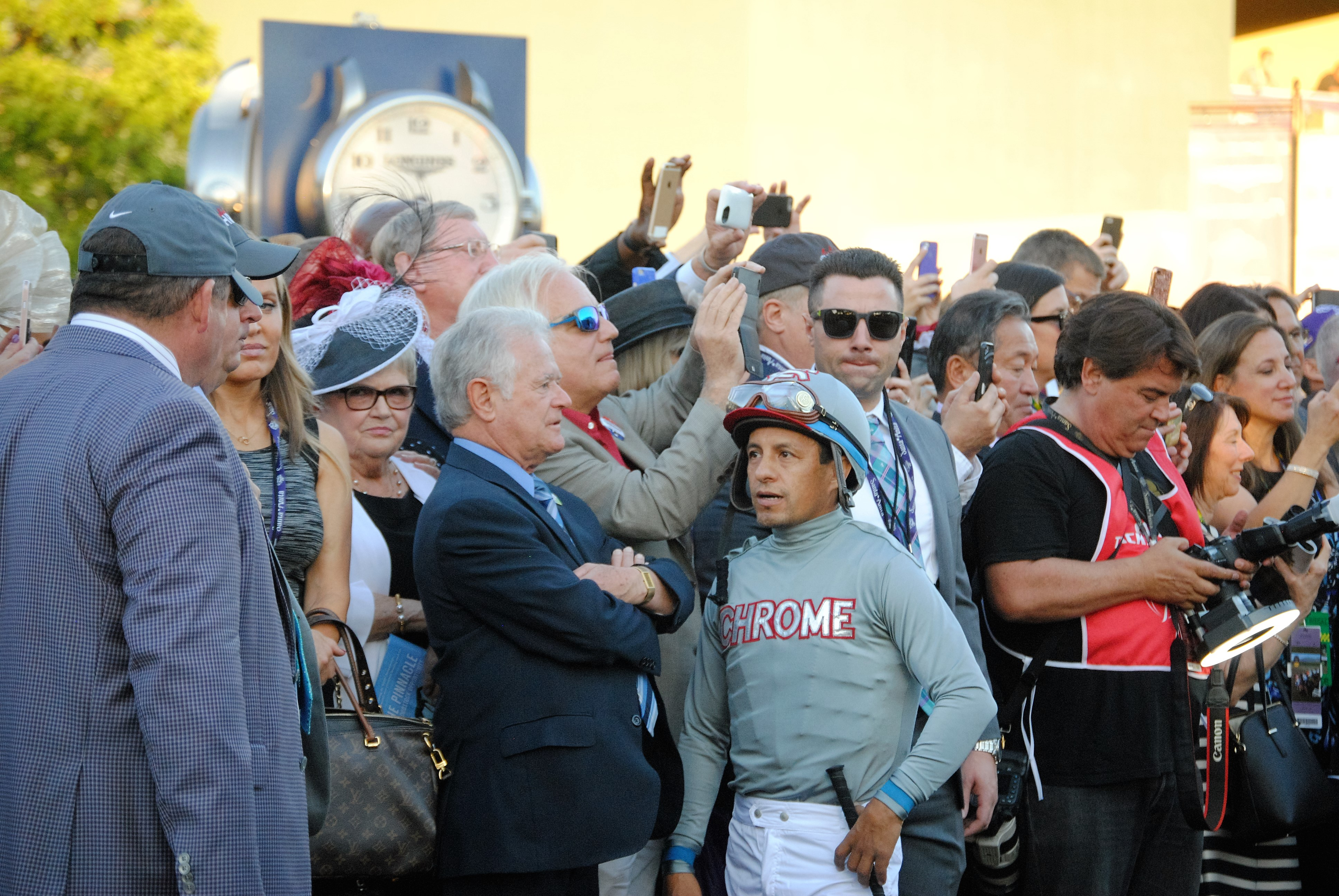
Espinoza (in gray silks) with Art Sherman before the 2016 Breeders' Cup Classic

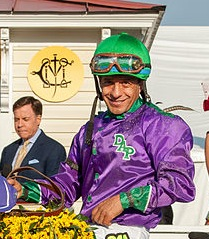
Espinoza in the winner's circle of the 2014 Preakness Stakes

Chart (2000–present)	Peak position
National Earnings List for Jockeys 2000	5
National Earnings List for Jockeys 2001	11
National Earnings List for Jockeys 2002	6
National Earnings List for Jockeys 2003	14
National Earnings List for Jockeys 2004	3
National Earnings List for Jockeys 2005	9
National Earnings List for Jockeys 2006	3
National Earnings List for Jockeys 2007	12
National Earnings List for Jockeys 2008	27
National Earnings List for Jockeys 2009	20
National Earnings List for Jockeys 2010	27
National Earnings List for Jockeys 2011	19
National Earnings List for Jockeys 2012	49
National Earnings List for Jockeys 2013	24
National Earnings List for Jockeys 2014	8
National Earnings List for Jockeys 2015	6
National Earnings List for Jockeys 2016	34
National Earnings List for Jockeys 2017	44
National Earnings List for Jockeys 2018	128
National Earnings List for Jockeys 2019	84
National Earnings List for Jockeys 2020	59
