= Stevie Wonderboy =

American-bred Thoroughbred racehorse

- Sire: Stephen Got Even
- Grandsire: A.P. Indy
- Dam: Heat Lightning
- Damsire: Summer Squall
- Sex: Stallion
- Foaled: 2003
- Country: United States
- Colour: Chestnut
- Breeder: John Gunther, Tony Holmes, Walter Zent
- Owner: Merv Griffin Ranch Company
- Trainer: Doug O'Neill
- Record: 6: 3-2-1
- Earnings: $1,058,940

Major wins
- Del Mar Futurity (2005); Breeders' Cup Juvenile (2005)

Awards
- United States Champion 2-Yr-Old Colt (2005)
- Last updated on June 11, 2007

Stevie Wonderboy (foaled 2003 in Kentucky) is a retired Thoroughbred race horse.

== Background ==
Stevie Wonderboy is owned by the Merv Griffin Ranch Company. He was bred in Kentucky by John Gunther, Tony Holmes and Walter Zent. He was trained by Doug O'Neill, in all of his lifetime starts and was ridden by Garrett Gomez. Stevie Wonderboy is the son of Stephen Got Even out of the mare Heat Lightning, a daughter of the Storm Bird colt, Summer Squall. His grandsire is U.S. Racing Hall of Fame inductee, A.P. Indy.

His breeding line includes such notable horses as Secretariat, Seattle Slew, Bold Ruler and Northern Dancer.

== Racing career ==
Competing in 2005, his performances that year, capped off by a win in the fall's Breeders' Cup Juvenile, earned him the Eclipse Award for Outstanding 2-Year-Old Male Horse. Going into the 2006 racing season he was expected to be a contender for the U.S. Triple Crown. However, on February 7, 2006, it was announced that Stevie Wonderboy had suffered a hairline fracture in his ankle. On February 8, a screw was inserted into his leg to correct the fracture. The announcement was made that he would not race in the Kentucky Derby or any of the Triple Crown races. In July 2007, it was announced that Stevie Wonderboy had retired.

== Races ==
=== 2006 ===
- 2nd, San Rafael Stakes, Grade II, Santa Anita Park, January 14, 2006

=== 2005 ===
- 1st, Breeders' Cup Juvenile, Grade I, Belmont Park, October 29, 2005.
- 1st, Del Mar Futurity, Grade II, Del Mar Racetrack, September 7, 2005.
- 1st, Maiden, Del Mar Racetrack, August 6, 2005.
- 3rd, Hollywood Juvenile Championship Stakes, Grade III, Hollywood Park Racetrack, July 16, 2005.
- 2nd, Maiden, Hollywood Park Racetrack, June 18, 2005.
