= Flavien Prat =

French-American jockey (b. 1992)

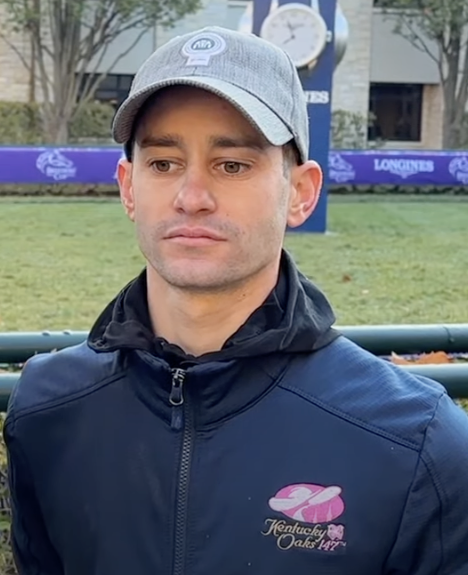
- Prat in 2022

Personal information
- Born: 4 August 1992 (age 34) Melun, Seine-et-Marne, France

Horse racing career
- Sport: Horse racing
- Career wins: 2,112+ (ongoing); As of November 2, 2025

Major racing wins
- Group 1 Wins in France: Prix Marcel Boussac (2013) Grade 1 Wins in United States: Bing Crosby Stakes (2015, 2016, 2017, 2018, 2020, 2021); Santa Anita Sprint Championship (2016, 2021); Gamely Stakes (2016, 2019); Derby City Distaff Stakes (2016, 2023); La Brea Stakes (2016, 2018); Rodeo Drive Stakes (2016, 2017, 2018); Debutante Stakes (2017, 2018, 2021); Chandelier Stakes (2017, 2018); Zenyatta Stakes (2017, 2020, 2021); Rodeo Drive Stakes (2017, 2019, 2021, 2023); Shoemaker Mile Stakes (2018, 2025); Shadwell Turf Mile Stakes (2019); Pacific Classic Stakes (2019, 2022, 2023); Del Mar Futurity (2020, 2023, 2024); American Pharoah Stakes (2020); American Oaks (2020); Del Mar Oaks (2021); Hollywood Gold Cup Stakes (2021); Malibu Stakes (2021, 2023); First Lady Stakes (2021); Queen Elizabeth II Challenge Cup Stakes (2021, 2022); United Nations Stakes (2021, 2022); Manhattan Stakes (2021); Pennsylvania Derby (2021); Turf Classic Stakes (2021, 2024); American Turf Stakes (2021, 2022, 2025, 2026); Starlet Stakes (2022); Matriarch Stakes (2022); Madison Stakes (2022); Acorn Stakes (2022); Beholder Mile Stakes (2022, 2023, 2024); Frank E. Kilroe Mile Stakes (2022, 2024); Champagne Stakes (2022, 2024); Blue Grass Stakes (2022); Metropolitan Handicap (2022, 2024); Hollywood Derby (2023); Diana Stakes (2023, 2024); Coaching Club American Oaks (2023); Maker's Mark Mile Stakes (2023); Saratoga Derby (2023); Stephen Foster Stakes (2023); Arkansas Derby (2023); Hopeful Stakes (2024); Personal Ensign Stakes (2024); Forego Stakes (2024); H. Allen Jerkens Memorial Stakes (2024); Test Stakes (2024); Jockey Club Gold Cup Stakes (2024); Pegasus World Cup Invitational Stakes (2024); Remsen Stakes (2024, 2025) Grade 1 Wins in Canada: Northern Dancer Turf Stakes (2016) Breeders' Cup wins: Breeders' Cup Classic (2022, 2024); Breeders' Cup Filly & Mare Turf (2024); Breeders' Cup Juvenile (2019); Breeders' Cup Dirt Mile (2017, 2025); Breeders' Cup Turf Sprint (2016); Breeders' Cup Filly & Mare Sprint (2025) Canadian Triple Crown wins: Queen's Plate (2019) U.S. Triple Crown series: Kentucky Derby (2019); Preakness Stakes (2021)

Racing awards
- French Champion Apprentice Jockey (2009)

Significant horses
- Bal a Bali, Battle of Midway, Country House, Flightline, Hoppertunity, Indonésienne, Obviously, Sierra Leone, The Pizza Man, West Coast
- Updated on May 2, 2026

Flavien Prat (born August 4, 1992, in Melun, Seine-et-Marne, France) is a French jockey in Thoroughbred racing who was a Champion Apprentice Jockey and Group 1 race winner in France before moving full-time to the United States in 2015. Prat has won several jockey titles and numerous graded stakes races, including four Breeders' Cup races, the 2019 Kentucky Derby, and the 2021 Preakness Stakes.

In November 2025, the day after winning two races at the Breeders' Cup at Del Mar in California, Prat rode at Aqueduct Racetrack in New York where he finished with seven wins, including six in a row. He became the first jockey ever to ride seven winners in one day at a New York racetrack.

== Year-end charts ==
Chart (2003–present)	Rank by earnings
National Earnings List for Jockeys 2009	1747
National Earnings List for Jockeys 2010	982
National Earnings List for Jockeys 2011	-
National Earnings List for Jockeys 2012	1522
National Earnings List for Jockeys 2013	1031
National Earnings List for Jockeys 2014	664
National Earnings List for Jockeys 2015	43
National Earnings List for Jockeys 2016	11
National Earnings List for Jockeys 2017	11
National Earnings List for Jockeys 2018	10
National Earnings List for Jockeys 2019	5
National Earnings List for Jockeys 2020	11
National Earnings List for Jockeys 2021	5
