= American Pharoah Stakes =

American Thoroughbred horse race

- Class: Grade I
- Location: Santa Anita Park; Arcadia, California, United States
- Inaugurated: 1970
- Race type: Thoroughbred - Flat racing
- Website: www.oaktreeracing.com

Race information
- Distance: 1 1/16 miles (8.5 furlongs)
- Surface: dirt
- Track: left-handed
- Qualification: Two-year-olds
- Weight: 122 pounds (55 kg)
- Purse: $300,000 (since 2014)

The American Pharoah Stakes is an American Thoroughbred horse race run annually near the end of September during the fall meet at Santa Anita Park in Arcadia, California. A Grade I event, it is open to two-year-old horses and is held at a distance of one and one-sixteenth miles on the dirt.

The American Pharoah Stakes was run as the Norfolk Stakes through 2011. In 2012, it was renamed to the FrontRunner Stakes after the lease with Oak Tree, the organization that formerly operated Santa Anita's fall meet, ended in 2010. It was renamed again in 2018 in honor of its 2014 winner, American Pharoah, who went on to win the U.S. Triple Crown in 2015.

This race is a Road to the Kentucky Derby Prep Season qualifying race. The winner receives 10 points toward qualifying for the Kentucky Derby. It is also currently part of the Breeders' Cup Challenge series. The winner automatically qualifies for the Breeders' Cup Juvenile.

First run in 1970, it became a Grade I event in 1980 but was downgraded to Grade II status in 1993. However, the American Graded Stakes Committee announced its return to Grade I status for 2007.

The race was run over a distance of 1 mile from 1997 through 2001. It was run in two divisions in 1980.

== Records ==
Speed record: (at current distance of 11/16 miles)

- 1:41.27 - Ruler's Court (2003)

Most wins by a jockey:

- 7 - Alex Solis (1985, 1991, 1999, 2001, 2003, 2005, 2008)

Most wins by a trainer:

- 14 - Bob Baffert (1997, 2000, 2002, 2004, 2009, 2012, 2014, 2018, 2019, 2021, 2023, 2024, 2026)

Most wins by an owner:

- 3 - Golden Eagle Farm (1990, 1992, 1997)

== Winners ==
| Year | Winner | Jockey | Trainer | Owner | Distance | Time | Win$ | Gr. |
|---|---|---|---|---|---|---|---|---|
| 2026 | Hughes | Juan J. Hernandez | Bob Baffert | Front Row Club, Starlight Racing, Madaket Stables, Stonestreet Stables, Bashor Racing, Albaugh Family Stables, Robert E. Masterson, Golconda Stable, Waves Edge Capital & Catherine Donovan | 1 1/16M | 1:43.22 | $180,000 | G1 |
| 2025 | Intrepido | Hector Isaac Berrios | Jeff Mullins | Dutch Girl Holdings LLC & Irving Ventures LLC | 1 1/16M | 1:43.67 | $180,000 | G1 |
| 2024 | Citizen Bull | Martin Garcia | Bob Baffert | SF Racing et al. (Note: The complete ownership list of Citizen Bull is as follow: SF Racing, Starlight Racing, Madaket Stables, Robert E. Masterson, Stonestreet Stables, Dianne Bashor, Determined Stables, Tom J. Ryan, Waves Edge Capital & Catherine Donovan) | 11/16 M | 1:43.07 | $180,000 | G1 |
| 2023 | Muth | Juan Hernandez | Bob Baffert | Zedan Racing | 11/16 M | 1:42.45 | $180,000 | G1 |
| 2022 | Cave Rock | Juan Hernandez | Bob Baffert | Mike Pegram, Karl Watson, Paul Weitman | 11/16 M | 1:43.05 | $180,000 | G1 |
| 2021 | Corniche | Mike E. Smith | Bob Baffert | Speedway Stables | 11/16 M | 1:44.75 | $180,000 | G1 |
| 2020 | Get Her Number | Flavien Prat | Peter Miller | Gary Barber | 11/16 M | 1:44.92 | $180,000 | G1 |
| 2019 | Eight Rings | John Velazquez | Bob Baffert | SF Racing LLC et al. | 11/16 M | 1:45.41 | $180,000 | G1 |
| 2018 | Game Winner | Joel Rosario | Bob Baffert | Gary & Mary West | 11/16 M | 1:43.77 | $180,000 | G1 |
FrontRunner Stakes (2011–2017)
| 2017 | Bolt d'Oro | Corey Nakatani | Mick Ruis | Ruis Racing | 11/16 M | 1:43.54 | $180,000 | G1 |
| 2016 | Gormley | Victor Espinoza | John Shirreffs | Jerry & Ann Moss | 11/16 M | 1:43.57 | $180,000 | G1 |
| 2015 | Nyquist | Mario Gutierrez | Doug F. O'Neill | Reddam Racing | 11/16 M | 1:44.89 | $180,000 | G1 |
| 2014 | American Pharoah | Victor Espinoza | Bob Baffert | Zayat Stables | 11/16 M | 1:41.95 | $180,000 | G1 |
| 2013 | Bond Holder | Mario Gutierrez | Doug F. O'Neill | Reddam Racing | 11/16 M | 1:45.02 | $150,000 | G1 |
| 2012 | Power Broker | Rafael Bejarano | Bob Baffert | Gary & Mary West | 11/16 M | 1:44.44 | $150,000 | G1 |
Norfolk Stakes (1970–2011)
| 2011 | Creative Cause | Joel Rosario | Mike Harrington | Heinz Steinman | 11/16 M | 1:42.66 | $150,000 | G1 |
| 2010‡ | Jaycito | Mike E. Smith | Mike Mitchell | Zayat Stables | 11/16 M | 1:44.17 | $150,000 | G1 |
| 2009 | Lookin at Lucky | Garrett Gomez | Bob Baffert | Mike Pegram, Karl Watson, Paul Weitman | 11/16 M | 1:43.11 | $180,000 | G1 |
| 2008 | Street Hero | Alex Solis | Myung Kwon Cho | Myung Kwon Cho | 11/16 M | 1:42.12 | $150,000 | G1 |
| 2007 | Dixie Chatter | Richard Migliore | Richard E. Mandella | Herman Sarkowsky | 11/16 M | 1:42.64 | $150,000 | G1 |
| 2006 | Stormello | Kent Desormeaux | William L. Currin | William L. Currin & Al Eisman | 11/16 M | 1:43.10 | $150,000 | G2 |
| 2005 | Brother Derek | Alex Solis | Dan L. Hendricks | Cecil N. Peacock | 11/16 M | 1:44.38 | $120,000 | G2 |
| 2004 | Roman Ruler | Corey Nakatani | Bob Baffert | Fog City Stable | 11/16 M | 1:44.27 | $120,000 | G2 |
| 2003 | Ruler's Court | Alex Solis | Eoin G. Harty | Darley Stable | 11/16 M | 1:41.27 | $150,000 | G2 |
| 2002 | Kafwain | Victor Espinoza | Bob Baffert | The Thoroughbred Corp. | 11/16 M | 1:42.75 | $120,000 | G2 |
| 2001 | Essence of Dubai | Alex Solis | Eoin G. Harty | Godolphin Racing | 1 M | 1:37.16 | $150,000 | G2 |
| 2000 | Flame Thrower | Victor Espinoza | Bob Baffert | Gary M. Garber | 1 M | 1:34.86 | $120,000 | G2 |
| 1999 | Dixie Union | Alex Solis | Richard E. Mandella | Diamond A Racing & Herman Sarkowsky | 1 M | 1:35.79 | $120,000 | G2 |
| 1998 | Buck Trout | Eddie Delahoussaye | Mike Harrington | Heinz Steinmann | 1 M | 1:37.55 | $120,000 | G2 |
| 1997 | Souvenir Copy | Gary Stevens | Bob Baffert | Golden Eagle Farm | 1 M | 1:36.00 | $120,000 | G2 |
| 1996 | Free House | Kent Desormeaux | J. Paco Gonzalez | Trudy McCaffery & John Toffan | 11/16 M | 1:43.54 | $120,000 | G2 |
| 1995 | Future Quest | Kent Desormeaux | Ron McAnally | VHW Stables | 11/16 M | 1:43.31 | $120,000 | G2 |
| 1994 | Supremo | Gary Stevens | Richard W. Mulhall | The Thoroughbred Corp. | 11/16 M | 1:43.48 | $120,000 | G2 |
| 1993 | Shepherd's Field | Chris McCarron | Brad MacDonald | Camptown Stable | 11/16 M | 1:43.11 | $120,000 | G2 |
| 1992 | River Special | Kent Desormeaux | Robert B. Hess Jr. | Golden Eagle Farm | 11/16 M | 1:43.58 | $120,000 | G1 |
| 1991 | Bertrando | Alex Solis | Bruce Headley | 505 Farms | 11/16 M | 1:42.87 | $164,820 | G1 |
| 1990 | Best Pal | Pat Valenzuela | Ian P. D. Jory | Golden Eagle Farm | 11/16 M | 1:42.80 | $178,620 | G1 |
| 1989 | Grand Canyon | Chris McCarron | D. Wayne Lukas | D. Wayne Lukas & Overbrook Farm | 11/16 M | 1:43.20 | $166,440 | G1 |
| 1988 | Hawkster | Pat Valenzuela | Ron McAnally | J. Shelton Meredith | 11/16 M | 1:43.40 | $187,740 | G1 |
| 1987 | Saratoga Passage | Joe Steiner | Robert W. Leonard | Saratoga I Stable | 11/16 M | 1:45.00 | $181,140 | G1 |
| 1986 | Capote | Laffit Pincay Jr. | D. Wayne Lukas | Barry Beal, L. R. French Jr. & Gene Klein | 11/16 M | 1:45.20 | $193,680 | G1 |
| 1985 | Snow Chief | Alex Solis | Melvin F. Stute | Grinstead & Rochelle | 11/16 M | 1:44.60 | $167,340 | G1 |
| 1984 | Chief's Crown | Don MacBeth | Roger Laurin | Star Crown Stable | 11/16 M | 1:42.40 | $201,960 | G1 |
| 1983 | Fali Time | Sandy Hawley | Gary F. Jones | James L. Mamakos & Marc Stubrin | 11/16 M | 1:44.20 | $168,930 | G1 |
| 1982 | Roving Boy | Eddie Delahoussaye | Joseph Manzi | Robert E. Hibbert | 11/16 M | 1:41.60 | $181,110 | G1 |
| 1981 | Stalwart | Chris McCarron | D. Wayne Lukas | Marvin L. Warner | 11/16 M | 1:42.20 | $140,790 | G1 |
| 1980-1 | Sir Dancer | Frank Olivares | Charles M. Marikian | George Arakelian Farms | 11/16 M | 1:43.80 | $100,980 | G1 |
| 1980-2 | High Counsel | Larry Gilligan | Charles Whittingham | Nelson Bunker Hunt | 11/16 M | 1:42.80 | $99,780 | G1 |
| 1979 | The Carpenter | Chris McCarron | Willard L. Proctor | Cardiff Stud Farm | 11/16 M | 1:41.80 | $119,280 | G2 |
| 1978 | Flying Paster | Don Pierce | Gordon C. Campbell | Bernard J. Ridder | 11/16 M | 1:42.20 | $118,860 | G2 |
| 1977 | Balzac | Bill Shoemaker | Charles Whittingham | Elizabeth A. Keck | 11/16 M | 1:45.40 | $157,230 | G2 |
| 1976 | Habitony | Bill Shoemaker | Tommy Doyle | Anton W. Pejsa | 11/16 M | 1:42.00 | $79,290 | G2 |
| 1975 | Telly's Pop | Francisco Mena | Melvin F. Stute | Howard W. Koch & Telly Savalas | 11/16 M | 1:43.60 | $74,295 | G2 |
| 1974 | George Navonod | Don Pierce | Gordon C. Campbell | Navonod Stables | 11/16 M | 1:42.20 | $77,370 | G2 |
| 1973 | Money Lender | Jerry Lambert | Johnny Longden | Hazel Longden | 11/16 M | 1:42.60 | $58,050 | G2 |
| 1972 | Groshawk | Bill Shoemaker | Charles Whittingham | Quinn & Muffett Martin | 11/16 M | 1:42.20 | $59,025 | |
| 1971 | MacArthur Park | Bill Shoemaker | Tommy Doyle | Mark Three Stable | 11/16 M | 1:41.80 | $59,445 | |
| 1970 | June Darling | William Mahorney | Warren Stute | Clement L. Hirsch | 11/16 M | 1:43.00 | $45,765 | |

‡ In 2010 run at Hollywood Park.

== See also ==
- Road to the Kentucky Derby
