= John C. Mabee =

American racehorse owner and breeder (1921–2002)

John Mabee
- Born: August 21, 1921; Seymour, Iowa, U.S.
- Died: April 24, 2002 (aged 80); Ramona, California, U.S.
- Occupations: Businessman: Supermarkets; Sports team owner Racehorse owner/breeder
- Awards: Eclipse Award for Outstanding Breeder (1991, 1997, 1998)

John C. Mabee (August 21, 1921 – April 24, 2002) was an American Thoroughbred racehorse owner and breeder whom About.com called "a California racing icon."

A native of Seymour, Iowa, as a young man of twenty, John Mabee moved to San Diego, California, where the climate more suited his health, having had pneumonia and bronchitis. There, he established Johnny's Market on 43rd Street. He turned that corner grocery store into the highly successful Big Bear Markets chain in San Diego County, selling it in 1994 to Albertsons and Fleming Companies.

== Thoroughbred racing ==
In 1957, he entered Thoroughbred horse racing, purchasing three yearlings at the Del Mar auction. His involvement led to him and wife, Betty establishing a breeding farm Golden Eagle Farm in Ramona, California, that the NTRA says became one of the most important in that state's history. They bred more than 170 stakes winners and seven millionaire horses, the most famous of which was Best Pal. The Mabees earned the Eclipse Award for Outstanding Breeder in 1991, 1997, and 1998. John Mabee served as a director of the California Thoroughbred Breeders Association and was a member of The Jockey Club from 1985 to his death in 2002. In addition, he was a founding member of the board of directors of Del Mar Thoroughbred Club. He served as the racing facility's president and then its chairman for close to twenty-five years. Mabee was also one of the original members of the board of directors of Breeders' Cup Limited.

For a time, John Mabee owned a 20 percent interest in the San Diego Chargers of the National Football League.

John Mabee died of a stroke in 2002. The John C. Mabee Handicap at Del Mar Racetrack is named in his honor.
