= Breeders' Cup Juvenile =

American Thoroughbred horse race

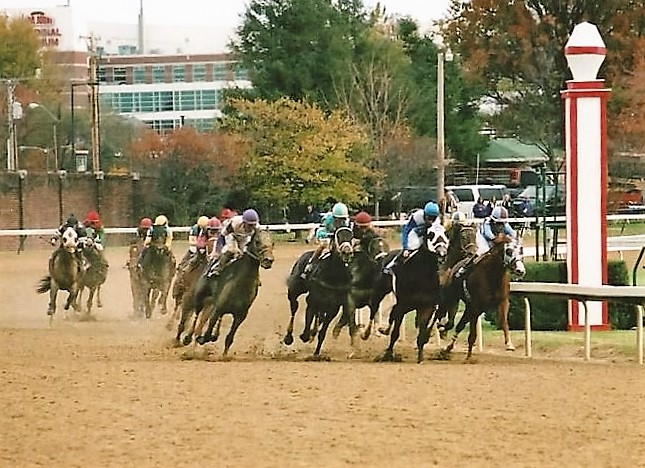
- The 2006 Breeders' Cup Juvenile
- Class: Grade I
- Location: North America
- Inaugurated: 1984
- Race type: Thoroughbred – Flat racing
- Website: www.breederscup.com

Race information
- Distance: 1 1/16 miles (8.5 furlongs)
- Surface: Dirt
- Track: left-handed
- Qualification: Two-year-old Colts and geldings
- Weight: Assigned
- Purse: US$2,000,000

The Breeders' Cup Juvenile is a Thoroughbred horse race for 2-year-old colts and geldings raced on dirt. It is held annually in late October or early November at a different racetrack in the United States or Canada as part of the Breeders' Cup World Championships. The current purse is US$2,000,000 making it the most valuable race for two-year-olds in North America. It is normally run at a distance of 1 1/16 miles.

The Breeders' Cup Juvenile is typically the first time that the best colts from the various racing circuits across North America (in New York, Kentucky and California in particular) meet up with each other. The winner often earns the Eclipse Award for Champion Two-Year-Old Male Horse, and becomes one of the early favorites for the next year's Kentucky Derby.

In 2006, the National Thoroughbred Racing Association (NTRA) wrote in Part 2 of their special series titled Spiraling To The Breeders' Cup that "Arazi turned in what many still consider to be the single-most spectacular performance in Breeders' Cup history."

Timber Country was the first Breeders' Cup Juvenile winner to win an American Triple Crown race when he went on to win the 1995 Preakness Stakes. The 2006 winner, Street Sense, became the first to capture the Kentucky Derby. In 2016, Nyquist won the Kentucky Derby as well.

== Automatic berths ==
Beginning in 2007, the Breeders' Cup developed the Breeders' Cup Challenge, a series of "Win and You're In" races that allot automatic qualifying bids to winners of defined races. Each of the fourteen divisions has multiple qualifying races, which change somewhat from year to year. Note that one horse may win multiple challenge races, while other challenge winners will not be entered in the Breeders' Cup for a variety of reasons such as injury or travel considerations.

In the Juvenile division, the number of runners is limited to 14. The 2025 "Win and You're In" races were:

1. the American Pharoah Stakes, a Grade 1 race run in October at Santa Anita Park in California
2. the Champagne Stakes, a Grade 1 race run in October at Aqueduct Racetrack in New York
3. the Breeders' Futurity, a Grade 1 race at Keeneland in Kentucky

== Records ==
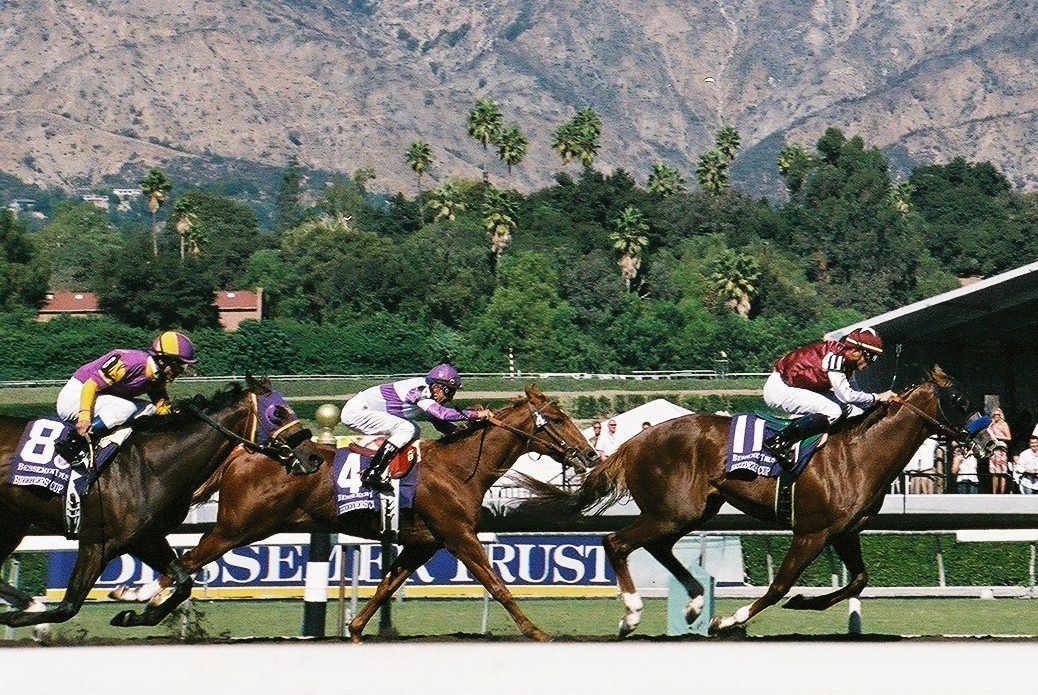
Midshipman in the 2008 Juvenile

Most wins by a jockey:

- 3 – Laffit Pincay Jr. (1985, 1986, 1988)
- 3 – Jerry Bailey (1996, 1998, 2000)
- 3 – Mike E. Smith (1995, 2002, 2021)
- 3 – John R. Velazquez (2010, 2023, 2025)

Most wins by a trainer:

- 7 - Bob Baffert (2002, 2008, 2013, 2018, 2021, 2024, 2026)

Most wins by an owner:

- 3 – Repole Stable (2010 with partners, 2022, 2023)
- 2 – Eugene V. Klein (1987, 1988)
- 2 – Overbrook Farm (with partners in 1994, 1996)
- 2 – Michael Tabor & Susan Magnier (2001, with partners in 2012)
- 2 – Gary & Mary West (2013, 2018)
- 2 – Godolphin (2009, 2020)

== Winners ==
Year	Winner	Jockey	Trainer	Owner	Time	Distance	Purse	Grade
2026	Hughes	Flavien Prat	Bob Baffert	Front Row Club, Starlight Racing, Madaket Stakes, et al.	1:42.27	1 1/16 miles	$2,000,000	I
2025	Ted Noffey	John R. Velazquez	Todd A. Pletcher	Spendthrift Farm	1:42.25	1 1/16 miles	$2,000,000	I
2024	Citizen Bull	Martin Garcia	Bob Baffert	SF Racing, Starlight Racing et al.	1:43.07	1 1/16 miles	$2,000,000	I
2023	Fierceness	John R. Velazquez	Todd A. Pletcher	Repole Stable	1:41.90	1 1/16 miles	$2,000,000	I
2022	Forte	Irad Ortiz Jr.	Todd A. Pletcher	Repole Stable & St. Elias Stables	1:43.06	1 1/16 miles	$2,000,000	I
2021	Corniche	Mike E. Smith	Bob Baffert	Speedway Stables LLC	1:42.50	1 1/16 miles	$2,000,000	I
2020	Essential Quality	Luis Saez	Brad H. Cox	Godolphin Stables	1:42.09	1 1/16 miles	$2,000,000	I
2019	Storm the Court	Flavien Prat	Peter Eurton	Exline-Border Racing LLC et al.	1:44.93	1 1/16 miles	$2,000,000	I
2018	Game Winner	Joel Rosario	Bob Baffert	Gary and Mary West	1:43.67	1 1/16 miles	$2,000,000	I
2017	Good Magic	José L. Ortiz	Chad C. Brown	e Five Racing & Stonestreet Stables	1:43.34	1 1/16 miles	$2,000,000	I
2016	Classic Empire	Julien Leparoux	Mark E. Casse	John C. Oxley	1:42.60	1 1/16 miles	$2,000,000	I
2015	Nyquist	Mario Gutierrez	Doug O'Neill	Reddam Racing	1:43.79	1 1/16 miles	$2,000,000	I
2014	Texas Red	Kent Desormeaux	Keith Desormeaux	Erich Brehm, Wayne Detmar et al.	1:41.91	1 1/16 miles	$2,000,000	I
2013	New Year's Day	Martin Garcia	Bob Baffert	Gary and Mary West	1:43.52	1 1/16 miles	$2,000,000	I
2012	Shanghai Bobby	Rosie Napravnik	Todd A. Pletcher	Starlight Racing, John Magnier, Michael Tabor & Derrick Smith	1:44.58	1 1/16 miles	$2,000,000	I
2011	Hansen	Ramon Domínguez	Michael Maker	Kendall Hansen, MD & Sky Chai Racing	1:44.44	1 1/16 miles	$2,000,000	I
2010	Uncle Mo	John R. Velazquez	Todd A. Pletcher	Repole Stable	1:42.60	1 1/16 miles	$2,000,000	I
2009	Vale of York (IRE)	Ahmed Ajtebi	Saeed bin Suroor	Godolphin	1:43.48	1 1/16 miles	$2,000,000	I
2008	Midshipman	Garrett Gomez	Bob Baffert	Darley Stable	1:40.94	1 1/16 miles	$2,000,000	I
2007	War Pass	Cornelio Velásquez	Nick Zito	Robert V. LaPenta	1:42.76	1 1/16 miles	$2,000,000	I
2006	Street Sense	Calvin Borel	Carl Nafzger	James B. Tafel	1:42.59	1 1/16 miles	$2,000,000	I
2005	Stevie Wonderboy	Garrett Gomez	Doug O'Neill	Merv Griffin Ranch Company	1:41.64	1 1/16 miles	$1,500,000	I
2004	Wilko	Frankie Dettori	Jeremy Noseda	J. Paul Reddam	1:42.09	1 1/16 miles	$1,500,000	I
2003	Action This Day	David R. Flores	Richard Mandella	B. Wayne Hughes	1:43.62	1 1/16 miles	$1,500,000	I
2002	Vindication	Mike E. Smith	Bob Baffert	Padua Stables	1:49.61	1 1/8 miles	$1,000,000	I
2001	Johannesburg	Michael Kinane	Aidan O'Brien	Michael Tabor & Susan Magnier	1:42.27	1 1/16 miles	$1,000,000	I
2000	Macho Uno	Jerry Bailey	Joseph Orseno	Stronach Stables	1:42.05	1 1/16 miles	$1,000,000	I
1999	Anees	Gary Stevens	Alex Hassinger Jr.	The Thoroughbred Corp.	1:42.29	1 1/16 miles	$1,000,000	I
1998	Answer Lively	Jerry Bailey	Bobby C. Barnett	John A. Franks	1:44.00	1 1/16 miles	$1,000,000	I
1997	Favorite Trick	Pat Day	Patrick B. Byrne	Joseph LaCombe Stable	1:41.47	1 1/16 miles	$1,000,000	I
1996	Boston Harbor	Jerry Bailey	D. Wayne Lukas	Overbrook Farm	1:43.40	1 1/16 miles	$1,000,000	I
1995	Unbridled's Song	Mike E. Smith	James T. Ryerson	Paraneck Stable (Ernie Paragallo)	1:41.60	1 1/16 miles	$1,000,000	I
1994	Timber Country	Pat Day	D. Wayne Lukas	Overbrook Farm, Gainsway Farm & Robert B. Lewis	1:44.55	1 1/16 miles	$1,000,000	I
1993	Brocco	Gary Stevens	Randy Winick	Albert R. Broccoli	1:42.99	1 1/16 miles	$1,000,000	I
1992	Gilded Time	Chris McCarron	Darrell Vienna	David Milch, Jack Silverman & Mark Silverman	1:43.43	1 1/16 miles	$1,000,000	I
1991	Arazi	Pat Valenzuela	François Boutin	Allen E. Paulson	1:44.78	1 1/16 miles	$1,000,000	I
1990	Fly So Free	José A. Santos	Scotty Schulhofer	Tommy Valando	1:43.40	1 1/16 miles	$1,000,000	I
1989	Rhythm	Craig Perret	Claude R. McGaughey III	Ogden Mills Phipps	1:43.60	1 1/16 miles	$1,000,000	I
1988	Is It True	Laffit Pincay Jr.	D. Wayne Lukas	Eugene V. Klein	1:46.60	1 1/16 miles	$1,000,000	I
1987	Success Express	José A. Santos	D. Wayne Lukas	Eugene V. Klein	1:35.20	1 mile	$1,000,000	I
1986	Capote	Laffit Pincay Jr.	D. Wayne Lukas	Barry A. Beal, Lloyd R. French Jr. & Eugene V. Klein	1:43.80	1 1/16 miles	$1,000,000	I
1985	Tasso	Laffit Pincay Jr.	Neil Drysdale	Gerald Robins	1:36.20	1 mile	$1,000,000	I
1984	Chief's Crown	Don MacBeth	Roger Laurin	Star Crown Stable (Andrew Rosen, et al.)	1:36.20	1 mile	$1,000,000	I

== See also ==
- Breeders' Cup Juvenile "top three finishers" and starters
- Breeders' Cup World Thoroughbred Championships
- American thoroughbred racing top attended events
- Road to the Kentucky Derby
