= 2017 Belmont Stakes =

American horse race

149th Belmont Stakes
- Belmont Stakes
- "The Test of the Champion"
- Location: Belmont Park; Elmont, New York, United States
- Date: June 10, 2017
- Distance: 1 1/2 mi (12 furlongs; 2,414 m)
- Winning horse: Tapwrit
- Winning time: 2:30.02
- Final odds: 5.30 (to 1)
- Jockey: José Ortiz
- Trainer: Todd Pletcher
- Owner: Bridlewood Farm, Eclipse Thoroughbred Partners & Robert LaPenta
- Conditions: Fast
- Surface: Dirt
- Attendance: 57,729

The 2017 Belmont Stakes was the 149th running of the Belmont Stakes and the 106th time the event took place at Belmont Park. The 1 1/2-mile (2,400 m) race, known as the "test of the champion", is the final jewel in Thoroughbred horse racing's American Triple Crown series. The race was on June 10, 2017, and was broadcast by NBC starting at 5 PM EDT. For the second straight year, the Belmont did not have a Triple Crown at stake, as 2017 Kentucky Derby winner Always Dreaming had lost in the Preakness Stakes. The race was won by Tapwrit.

== Field ==
The connections of both Always Dreaming, the 2017 Kentucky Derby winner, and Cloud Computing, the winner of the 2017 Preakness Stakes, decided to bypass the Belmont. Classic Empire would have been the favorite of the remaining contenders for the race, but was withdrawn on June 7 because of a recurrent foot abscess. Classic Empire, the champion two-year-old colt of 2016, finished fourth in the Derby and second in the Preakness.

Another leading contender was Epicharis, a Japanese-bred horse who qualified on the 2017 Road to the Kentucky Derby but who bypassed that race to focus on the Belmont. The New York Racing Association offers a $1-million bonus to any Japan-based horse who wins the Belmont. Epicharis entered a one-week isolation protocol on May 25 and shipped to Belmont Park on June 1. Unfortunately, Epicharis went lame on June 7 and was scratched on June 10 by the state veterinarian. "He had foot soreness – heel soreness – earlier in the week and he just wasn’t sound", said Scott Palmer, NYRA's equine medical director. "In a week maybe he could be ready, but we ran out of time. The right decision was made. The top priority is the horse."

In their absence, Irish War Cry was made the morning line favorite at odds of 7–2. Irish War Cry won the Wood Memorial Stakes in April and finished tenth in the Kentucky Derby.

Other confirmed contenders include Tapwrit (Tampa Bay Derby); Gormley (Santa Anita Derby); J Boys Echo (Gotham Stakes); Lookin At Lee (2nd Kentucky Derby); Multiplier (Illinois Derby); Senior Investment (Lexington Stakes); Twisted Tom (Federico Tesio Stakes); Meantime (2nd Peter Pan Stakes); Patch (2nd Louisiana Derby); and Hollywood Handsome (5th Illinois Derby).

The post position draw was held on June 7.

== Race description ==
Even though a Triple Crown was not at stake, the race drew a good crowd of 57,729. The start was good, but the field was tightly bunched going into the first turn. At the back of the pack, longshot Hollywood Handsome checked sharply after almost clipping heels with the horses in front of him, causing jockey Florent Geroux to lose his stirrups. Hollywood Handsome raced out of control for nearly a quarter of a mile before Geroux was able to pull him up. The horse was vanned off the racetrack as a safety precaution but suffered only a laceration below the left knee.

With no true speed horses in the race, Irish War Cry went to the lead and set a moderate pace. Tapwrit and Gormley raced together just off the pace and made their moves rounding the far turn. Tapwrit had the better acceleration and started closing ground on Irish War Cry down the stretch. As the gap narrowed, Tapwrit drifted out to the center of the track then drifted back towards the rail, brushing lightly with Irish War Cry. In the final strides, Tapwrit pulled clear, ultimately winning by two lengths. Patch closed ground late to beat out Gormley for third.

"Tapwrit was getting a beautiful trip", said Pletcher. "It was everything we talked about in the paddock before the race. We were hoping he had enough when it came to crunch time. It looked like Irish War Cry still had something left, but the last sixteenth, [Tapwrit] dug down deep."

"It actually wasn't our plan to be on the lead", said Graham Motion, the trainer of Irish War Cry. "We kind of hoped that somebody else would go for it, but he had to go to Plan B and [jockey] Rajiv [Maragh] did a great job."

The first four finishers had all run in the Derby, then skipped the Preakness. "We felt like with the five weeks in between, and with the way this horse had trained, that he had a legitimate chance", said Pletcher, who is based at Belmont Park. "I think that's always an advantage."

== Chart ==
Finish	Number	Horse	Jockey	Trainer	Opening Odds	Post Time Odds	Winnings
1	2	Tapwrit	José Ortiz	Todd Pletcher	6-1	5.30	$800,000
2	7	Irish War Cry	Rajiv Maragh	H. Graham Motion	7-2	2.70	$280,000
3	12	Patch	John Velazquez	Todd Pletcher	12-1	12.40	$150,000
4	3	Gormley	Victor Espinoza	John Shirreffs	8-1	9.10	$100,000
5	8	Senior Investment	Channing Hill	Kenneth McPeek	12-1	8.40	$60,000
6	1	Twisted Tom	Javier Castellano	Chad Brown	20-1	9.80	$45,000
7	6	Lookin At Lee	Irad Ortiz Jr.	Steve Asmussen	5-1	6.20	$35,000
8	9	Meantime	Mike E. Smith	Brian Lynch	15-1	13.40	$30,000
9	4	J Boys Echo	Robby Albarado	Dale Romans	15-1	11.50	
10	10	Multiplier	Joel Rosario	Brendan Walsh	15-1	14.10	
DNF	5	Hollywood Handsome	Florent Geroux	Dallas Stewart	30-1	23.10	

- Margins: 2 lengths, 6 3/4 lengths
- Track: Fast

Times: 1/4 mile – 0:23.88; 1/2 mile – 0:48.86; 3/4 mile – 1:14.01; mile – 1:38.95; 1 1/4 miles – 2:04.10; final – 2:30.02.
Splits for each quarter-mile: (:23.88) (:24.78) (:25.35) (:24.94) (:25.15) (:25.92)

Epicharis (#11) was scratched.

== Payout ==
The payouts for the Belmont Stakes were as follows:

Program number	Horse Name	Win	Place	Show
2	Tapwrit	$12.80	$6.50	$5.00
7	Irish War Cry	–	$4.70	$3.90
12	Patch	–	–	$6.50

- $2 Exacta: (2-7) $45.20
- $2 Trifecta: (2-7-12) $624.00
- $2 Superfecta: (2-7-12-3) $4,486.00

== See also ==
- 2017 Kentucky Derby
- 2017 Preakness Stakes
