= 2017 Preakness Stakes =

142nd running of the Preakness Stakes

142nd Preakness Stakes
- Preakness Stakes
- "The Middle Jewel of the Triple Crown" "The Run for the Black-Eyed Susans"
- Location: Pimlico Race Course; Baltimore, United States
- Date: May 20, 2017
- Distance: 1 3/16 mi (9.5 furlongs; 1,911.1 m)
- Winning horse: Cloud Computing
- Winning time: 1:55.98
- Final odds: 13.40–1
- Jockey: Javier Castellano
- Trainer: Chad C. Brown
- Owner: Klaravich Stables, Inc. and William H. Lawrence
- Conditions: Fast
- Surface: Dirt
- Attendance: ▲140,327 (record crowd)

The 2017 Preakness Stakes was the 142nd running of the Preakness Stakes, the second leg of the American Triple Crown. It is a Grade I stakes race for three-year-old Thoroughbreds at a distance of 1 3/16 miles (1.9 km) and was held on May 20, 2017, at Pimlico Race Course in Baltimore, Maryland. The race went off at 6:51 pm ET and was broadcast by NBC. It was won by Cloud Computing, upsetting Always Dreaming's chances of a Triple Crown. Classic Empire was second, and Senior Investment finished third.

The Maryland Jockey Club reported a track record total attendance of 140,327, the second highest attendance for American thoroughbred racing events in North America during 2017.

== Field ==
The field for the race included ten horses, led by Always Dreaming, the winner of the 2017 Kentucky Derby. Always Dreaming arrived at Pimlico on May 9 and was put in Stall 40 of the Preakness Stakes Barn, which is traditionally reserved for the Derby winner. His main challenger was expected to be Classic Empire, who finished fourth in the Derby despite being heavily bumped at the start. Other leading entries include Lookin at Lee (2nd in the Derby), Gunnevera (7th) and Hence (11th). Cloud Computing had qualified for the Derby in the 2017 Road to the Kentucky Derby point system, but his connections decided to bypass that race to focus on the Preakness.

The field also included several horses who did not qualify for the Derby, including Conquest Mo Money, who had to be supplemented to the Preakness at a cost of $150,000 as he had not been nominated to the Triple Crown series earlier in the year. Royal Mo was originally scheduled to enter the Preakness but injured himself during a workout and was retired.

The draw for post positions was held on May 17. Rivals Always Dreaming and Classic Empire drew posts 4 and 5, setting up a head-to-head matchup of the two morning line favorites.

== Race description ==
Despite rain the night before the race, the track dried out over the course of the day and was listed as fast for the Preakness. The race drew a record crowd of 140,327, beating the previous year's record of 135,256. The pari-mutuel take of $97,168,658 for the entire day's races also broke the previous record of $94,127,424 from 2016.

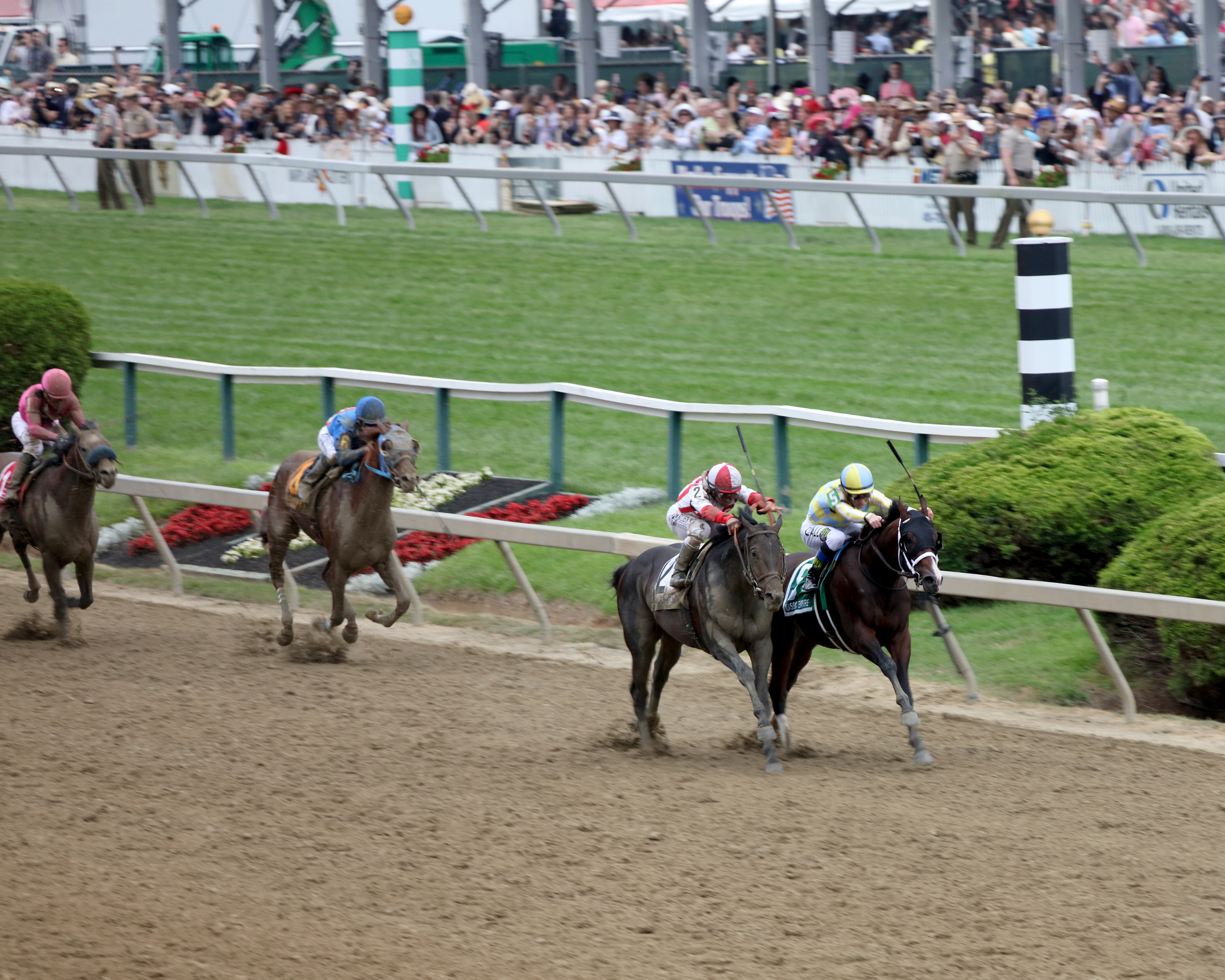
Cloud Computing (on the outside) closes ground on Classic Empire (on the rail) as they near the finish line.

Always Dreaming and Classic Empire went to the early lead and set a solid pace while Cloud Computing rated a few lengths behind in third. Around the final turn, Classic Empire surged to the lead, but Always Dreaming tired and dropped back. In mid-stretch, Classic Empire had a three-length lead and looked the likely winner before Cloud Computing angled out from traffic and started closing ground rapidly. Classic Empire tried to rally but could not hold off Cloud Computing, who won by a head.

Cloud Computing became just the fourth horse in the last 34 years to win the Preakness after not having raced in the Derby. The last horse to do so was the filly Rachel Alexandra in 2009. It was the first win of a Triple Crown race for his trainer Chad Brown and the second for jockey Javier Castellano, who was riding the colt for the first time. It was also the first Preakness win for owners Seth Klarman of Klaravich Stables and William Lawrence. Having grown up in Baltimore just a few blocks away from Pimlico, Klarman called the win incredibly special. "I think possibly some of the reason we won today was because we were patient and didn't throw an inexperienced horse against a 20-horse field in the Derby on a very difficult track", he said.

"I'm not going to dispute the fact that I brought in a fresh horse as part of our strategy", said Brown. "Classic Empire and Always Dreaming are two outstanding horses and our strategy was, if we were going to ever beat them, let's take them on two weeks' rest when we have six, and it worked."

== Result ==
The results of the race were as follows:

Finish	Post	Horse	Jockey	Trainer	Morning line odds	Final odds	Winnings
1	2	Cloud Computing	Javier Castellano	Chad C. Brown	12-1	13.40	$900,000
2	5	Classic Empire	Julien Leparoux	Mark Casse	3-1	2.20	$300,000
3	8	Senior Investment	Channing Hill	Ken McPeek	30-1	31.70	$165,000
4	9	Lookin At Lee	Corey Lanerie	Steve Asmussen	10-1	9.50	$90,000
5	6	Gunnevera	Mike E. Smith	Antonio Sano	15-1	11.20	$45,000
6	1	Multiplier	Joel Rosario	Brendan Walsh	30-1	19.60	
7	10	Conquest Mo Money	Jorge Carreno	Miguel Hernandez	15-1	10.70	
8	4	Always Dreaming	John Velazquez	Todd Pletcher	4-5	1.20	
9	3	Hence	Florent Geroux	Steve Asmussen	20-1	22.40	
10	7	Term of Art	José Ortiz	Doug O'Neill	30-1	46.70	

- Winning owner: Klaravich Stables, Inc. and Lawrence, William
- Winning breeder: Hill 'n' Dale Equine Holdings & Stretch Run Ventures
- Margins: Head, 4 3/4 lengths
- Track: Fast

Times: 1/4 mile – 0:23.16; 1/2 mile – 0:46.81; 3/4 mile – 1:11.00; mile – 1:36.63; final – 1:55.98.
Splits for each quarter-mile: (:23.16) (:23.65) (:24.19) (:25.63) (:19.35 for final 3/16)

== Payout ==
The 142nd Preakness payout schedule:

Pgm	Horse	Win	Place	Show
2	Cloud Computing	$28.80	$8.60	$6.00
5	Classic Empire	–	$4.40	$4.00
8	Senior Investment	–	–	$10.20

- $2 Exacta (2–5) $98.40
- $1 Trifecta (2–5–8) $1,097.30
- $1 Superfecta (2–5–8–9) $8,162.80
- $1 Super High Five (2–5–8–9–6) $283,223.40

== See also ==
- 2017 Kentucky Derby
- 2017 Belmont Stakes
