= Gunnevera =

American-bred Thoroughbred racehorse

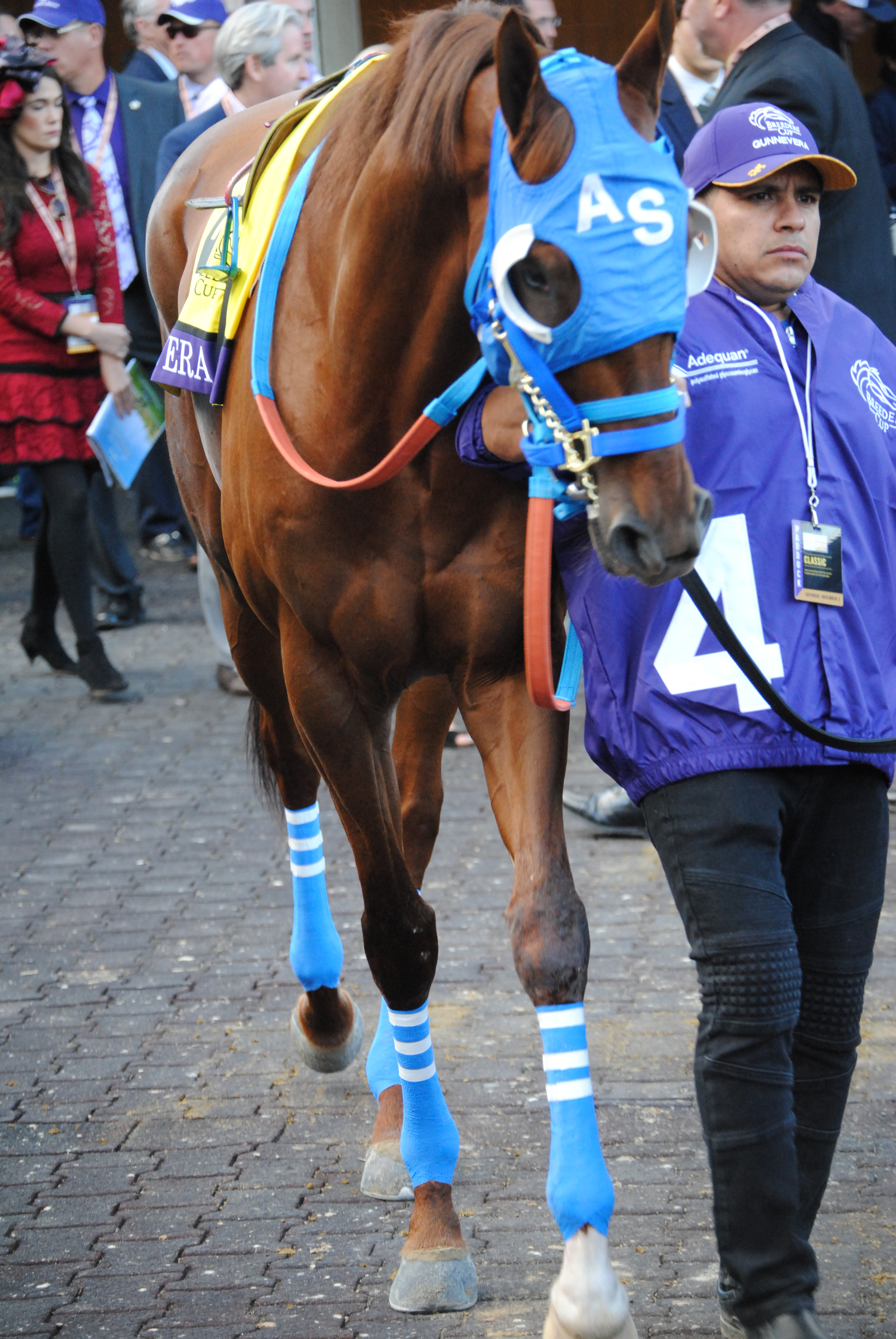
- Gunnevera at the 2018 Breeders' Cup
- Breed: Thoroughbred
- Sire: Dialed In
- Grandsire: Mineshaft
- Dam: Unbridled Rage
- Damsire: Unbridled
- Sex: Colt
- Foaled: February 28, 2014
- Country: United States
- Colour: Chestnut
- Breeder: Brandywine Farm
- Owner: Jaime Diaz-Mengotti/Peacock Stables
- Trainer: Antonio Sano
- Record: 21: 6–5–3
- Earnings: $5,561,800

Major wins
- Saratoga Special Stakes (2016); Delta Downs Jackpot Stakes (2016); Fountain of Youth Stakes (2017); Tangelo Stakes (2017)
- Last updated on August 26, 2017

Gunnevera (foaled February 28, 2014) is an American Thoroughbred racehorse. Orphaned from an early age, he became the leading juvenile earner from the first crop of Dialed In. He was a contender on the 2017 Road to the Kentucky Derby, winning the Delta Downs Jackpot Stakes as a two-year-old and the Fountain of Youth Stakes at Gulfstream Park during his three-year-old season. Given a layoff after finishing seventh in the Derby and fifth in the Preakness Stakes, he returned in August to win the Tangelo Stakes before finishing second in the Travers Stakes.

== Background ==
Gunnevera is a chestnut colt bred in Kentucky by Brandywine Farm in partnership with Stephen Upchurch. Gunnevera was sired by 2016 leading first-crop sire Dialed In, who won the Holy Bull Stakes and Florida Derby in 2011 before off-the-board finishes in both the Kentucky Derby and Preakness Stakes. Dialed In entered stud in 2013 at Darby Dan Farm and initially stood for $7,500. His stud fee has risen to $15,000 as of 2017.

Gunnevera's dam Unbridled Rage, a daughter of 1990 Kentucky Derby winner Unbridled, made only one career start, finishing eleventh in a maiden claimer at Churchill Downs. She was bought in 2005 by Brandywine as a ten-year-old broodmare for a mere $13,000, the low price due to the lack of success of her first four foals on the racetrack.

On February 28, 2014, the 19-year-old Unbridled Rage gave birth to Gunnevera, who was to be her final foal. Soon after Gunnevera's birth, Unbridled Rage began to hemorrhage. Over the next few days, her condition improved, but she died of a heart attack when Gunnevera was 10 days old. As a result, Gunnevera was raised by a nurse mare, a Paint Horse named Jenny.

As a yearling, Gunnevera was sold at the 2015 Keeneland September Yearling Sale for $16,000 to the Italian Venezuelan trainer Antonio Sano on behalf of Peacock Stables LLC. After the Preakness Stakes, Venezuelan business Salomon del Valle bought out the other partners in Peacock Stables to become the horse's sole owner, running him in the name of Sano Racing Stables. Sano was a highly successful horse trainer in Venezuela who fled to United States after having been kidnapped twice. During his second ordeal, he was held captive for 36 days. Sano's family and friends gathered money to pay for the ransom, which included everything Sano's family had. He and his family moved to Florida in 2009, leaving behind a 160-horse barn in Venezuela to start all over again. Sano re-established himself as a trainer in the United States, saddling 565 winners out by the end of 2017.

Following the sale, Gunnevera was sent to Julio Rada's Altamira Stable in Ocala, Florida to be broken in, and was sent back to Sano's barn when it came time for him to make his racing debut.

== Racing career ==
=== 2016: two-year-old season ===
Gunnevera made his racing debut on June 10, 2016, in a maiden race at Gulfstream Park, finishing second behind future stakes winner Three Rules. He finished fourth in his next start, again behind Three Rules, in the Birdonthewire Stakes. On July 16, he broke his maiden by making a late rally in a maiden special weight race at Gulfstream. Sano then moved him up to graded stakes company in the Saratoga Special Stakes on August 14, which he won with a last-to-first move. "Everything worked out great, we had a perfect trip," said jockey Javier Castellano. "Long term, he is going to be a really nice horse.".

Gunnevera finished fifth behind eventual two-year-old champion Classic Empire in the Gr.I Breeders' Futurity Stakes. In his final start as a juvenile, he found the winner's circle in the Delta Downs Jackpot Stakes.

=== 2017: three-year-old season ===
Gunnevera made his three-year-old debut in the Grade II Holy Bull Stakes on February 4, 2017, finishing second behind Irish War Cry but ahead of favorite Classic Empire, who finished third. Gunnevera then won the Fountain of Youth in his next start, defeating multiple Gr.I winner Practical Joke, Three Rules, and Irish War Cry. The win marked Gunnevera as one of the early favorites on the 2017 Road to the Kentucky Derby. In his final prep race for the Derby, he finished a distant third behind rising star Always Dreaming in the Florida Derby, despite a closing drive.

For the 2017 Kentucky Derby, Gunnevera was installed at 15-1 odds in a field of 20 horses. With Javier Castellano aboard, he finished seventh after getting caught in traffic at several points in the race. In his next start, the 2017 Preakness Stakes, Gunnevera was ridden by Mike E. Smith after Castellano opted to ride Cloud Computing, who won the race. Gunnevera finished fifth but came out of the race with bleeding in his left hind leg and did not start in the Belmont Stakes.

Given a brief layoff to recover, Gunnevera returned on August 6 in the Tangelo Stakes at Gulfstream Park. He rated behind a slow early pace, then moved to the lead as they moved into the far turn. Under a hand ride, he drew away to win by five lengths. "My horse is back 100%," said Sano. "The race was very easy for him today. He's gained weight, he's very happy, and now we'll go to the Travers."

On August 26, Gunnevera made his next start in the Grade I Travers Stakes at Saratoga. He was widely dismissed at odds of 20-1 on the morning line in a field of nine graded stakes winners, including the winners of the three Triple Crown races. After being bumped hard at the start, Gunnevera dropped well back for the first half mile before beginning a sustained run on the backstretch. He circled wide on the final turn and moved into contention in mid-stretch while bearing in and bumping with Irap, who finished third. Gunnevera finished second behind West Coast, then withstood a stewards' inquiry into the interference with Irap.

In the Breeders' Cup Classic held at Del Mar on November 5, Gunnevera faced older horses for the first time in a field that featured Horse of the Year candidates Gun Runner and Arrogate. He raced far back for the first three-quarters of a mile, then closed to finish in a dead-heat with Arrogate for fifth place.

=== 2018: four-year-old season ===
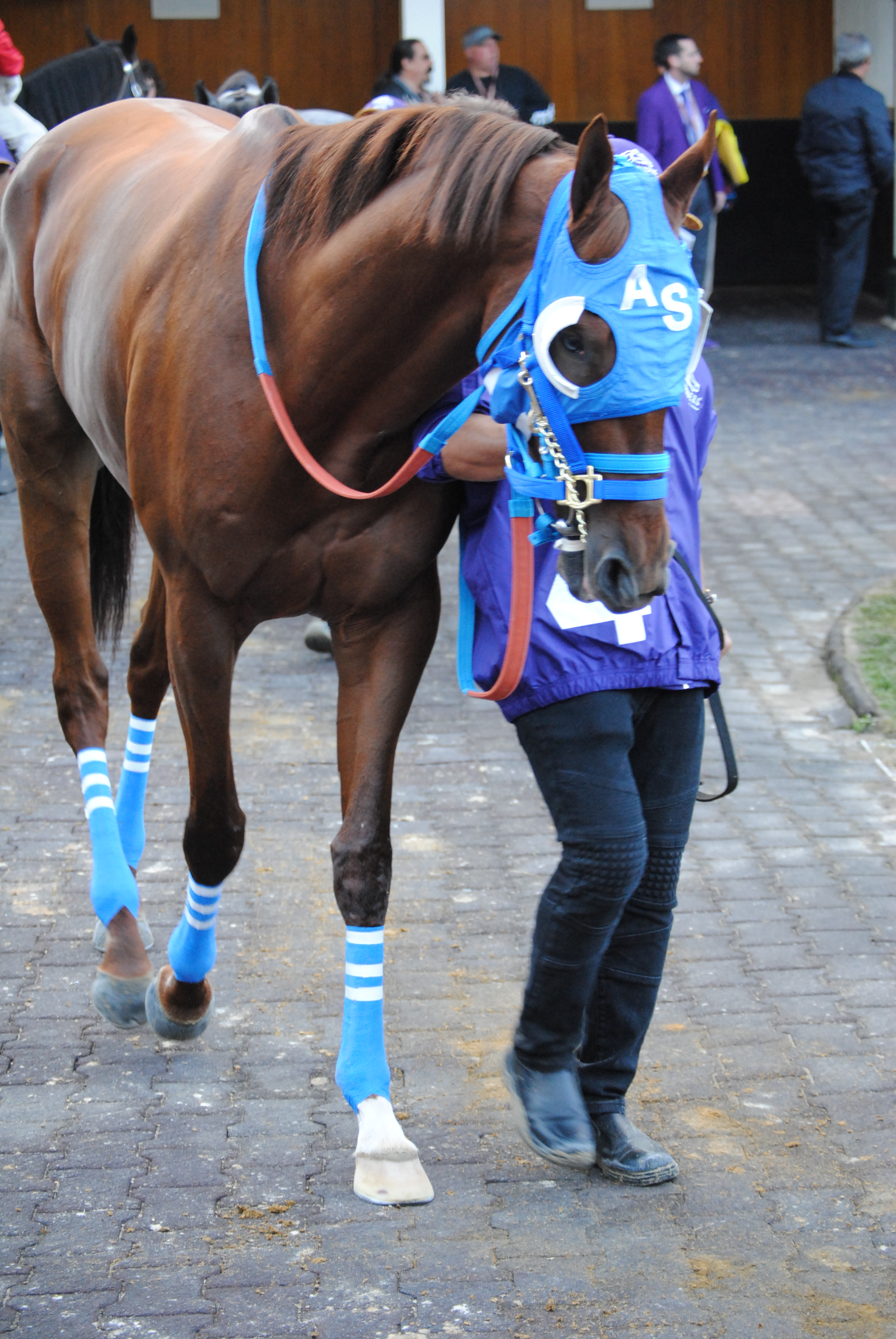
Gunnevera at the 2018 Breeders' Cup

== Stud Career ==
Gunnevera entered his stud career in 2021 at Pleasant Acres Stallions in Florida. His stud fee in 2024 was $6,000.

== Pedigree ==
Pedigree of Gunnevera, chestnut colt, 2014
Sire Dialed In 2008	Mineshaft; 1999	A.P. Indy	Seattle Slew
Sire Dialed In 2008	Mineshaft; 1999	A.P. Indy	Weekend Surprise
Sire Dialed In 2008	Mineshaft; 1999	Prospector's Delite	Mr. Prospector
Sire Dialed In 2008	Mineshaft; 1999	Prospector's Delite	Up the Flagpole
Sire Dialed In 2008	Miss Doolittle; 1998	Storm Cat	Storm Bird
Sire Dialed In 2008	Miss Doolittle; 1998	Storm Cat	Terlingua
Sire Dialed In 2008	Miss Doolittle; 1998	Eliza	Mt. Livermore
Sire Dialed In 2008	Miss Doolittle; 1998	Eliza	Daring Bidder
Dam Unbridled Rage 1995	Unbridled; 1987	Fappiano	Mr. Prospector
Dam Unbridled Rage 1995	Unbridled; 1987	Fappiano	Killaloe
Dam Unbridled Rage 1995	Unbridled; 1987	Gana Facil	Le Fabuleux
Dam Unbridled Rage 1995	Unbridled; 1987	Gana Facil	Charedi
Dam Unbridled Rage 1995	Suite; 1987	Graustark	Ribot
Dam Unbridled Rage 1995	Suite; 1987	Graustark	Flower Bowl
Dam Unbridled Rage 1995	Suite; 1987	Minstrel Princess	The Minstrel
Dam Unbridled Rage 1995	Suite; 1987	Minstrel Princess	Lucy Grey (family: 16-h)

Gunnevera is inbred 4 x 4 to Mr. Prospector, meaning Mr. Prospector appears twice in the fourth generation of his pedigree. Gunnevera is also inbred 5 x 5 to both Secretariat and Northern Dancer.
