= Saudi Crown =

American-bred thoroughbred racehorse

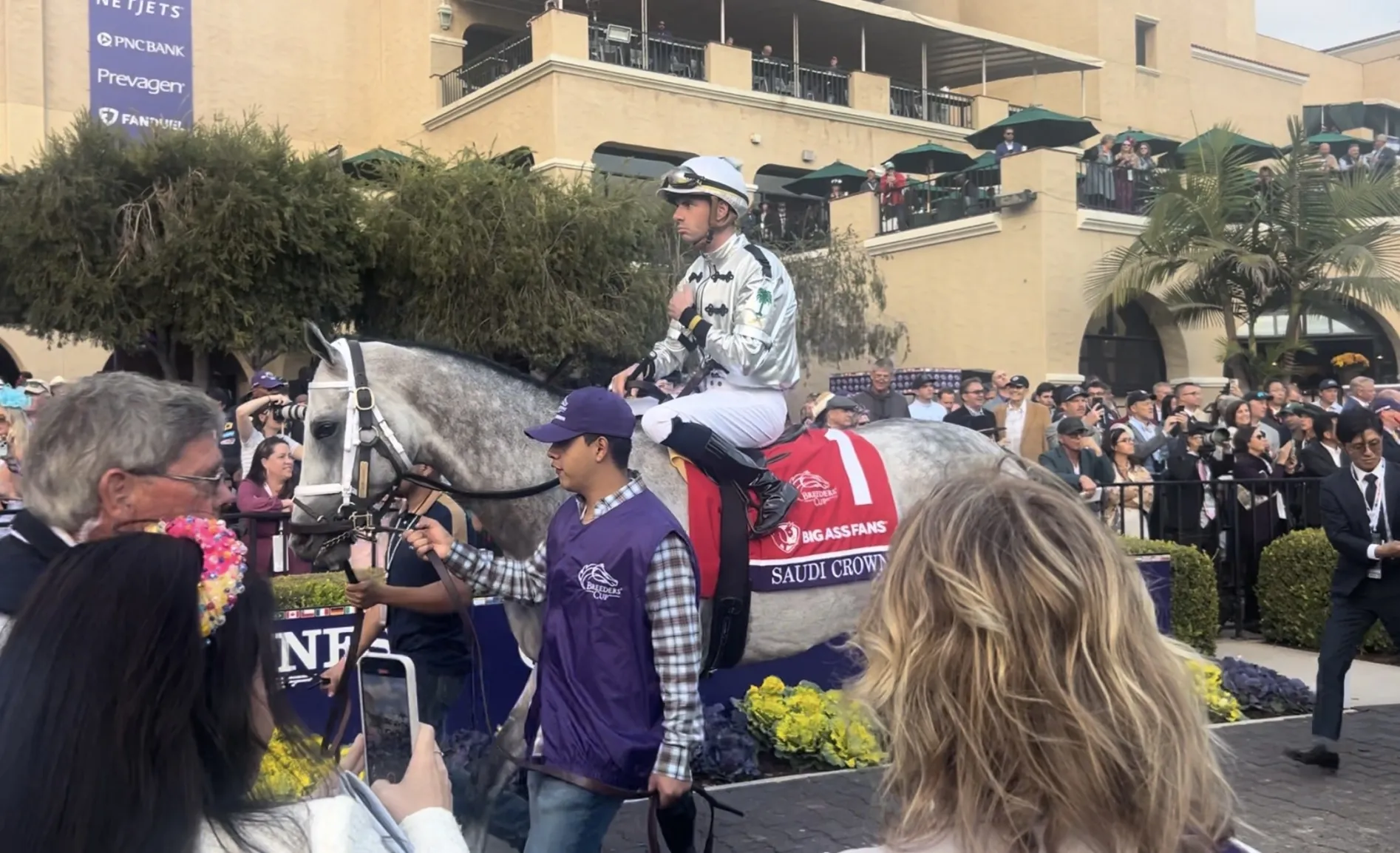
- Saudi Crown before the Breeders Cup Dirt Mile
- Sire: Always Dreaming
- Grandsire: Bodemeister
- Dam: New Narration
- Damsire: Tapit
- Sex: Colt
- Foaled: February 20, 2020
- Country: United States
- Color: Gray or roan colt
- Breeder: China Horse Club
- Owner: FMQ Stables
- Trainer: Brad H. Cox
- Record: 18: 9 - 3 - 1
- Earnings: US$$3,686,508

Major wins
- Pennsylvania Derby (2023); Louisiana Stakes (2024); Commonwealth Stakes (2026)
- Last updated on April 14, 2026

Saudi Crown (foaled February 20, 2020) is an American Thoroughbred racehorse who won the Grade I Pennsylvania Derby as a three-year-old in 2023.

== Background ==
Saudi Crown is a gray or roan colt that was bred in Kentucky by China Horse Club. Saudi Crown is the progeny of Always Dreaming, the 2017 Kentucky Derby who entered stud in 2019 and has two crops of racing age. Saudi Crown is Always Dreaming's first graded winner. In 2023 Always Dreaming was standing for $10,000 at WinStar Farm in Versailles, Kentucky. Saudi Crown is out from an unraced Tapit mare New Narration. He is one of two winners from as many foals of racing age from his dam, the other being Westphal (Exaggerator).

Saudi Crown has twice been through auctions. As a yearling he was sold at the 2021 Keeneland January Mixed Sale for $45,000. At the 2022 Ocala Breeders' Sales Company's Spring Sale of Two-Year-Olds in Training. Pedro Lanz, agent for Faisal Mohammed Alqahtani of FMQ Stables, acquired him there for $240,000 when consigned by Top Line Sales.

Saudi Crown is trained by Brad H. Cox.

== Career highlights ==
Saudi Crown did not race as a two-year-old and had his first start as a three-year-old in April at Keeneland winning a Maiden Special Weight event over six furlongs. Due to his late development Saudi Crown did not start in any of the Triple Crown events.

On July 1, 2023, Saudi Crown was a nose short in a defeat to Fort Bragg in the G3 Dwyer Stakes over a mile at Belmont Park.

On July 29, 2023, on a sloppy track, Saudi Crown was defeated by a nose by Forte in the G2 Jim Dandy Stakes at Saratoga Race Course.

On September 23, 2023, Saudi Crown led throughout on a sloppy track at Parx Racing to win the Grade I Pennsylvania Derby by 1/2 length defeating Dreamlike with Il Miracolo in third place.

== Statistics ==
Date	Distance	Race	Grade / Group	Track	Odds	Field	Finish	Winning Time	Winning (Losing) Margin	Jockey	Ref
2023 – three-year-old season
Apr 16, 2023	6 furlongs	Maiden Special Weight		Keeneland	5.88	10	1	1:10.01	4 1/4 lengths	Florent Geroux	
May 21, 2023	6 1/2 furlongs	Allowance		Churchill Downs	0.56*	8	1	1:15.88	1 3/4 lengths	Florent Geroux	
Jul 1, 2023	1 mile	Dwyer Stakes	III	Belmont Park	1.60	6	2	1:35.37	(nose)	Javier Castellano	
Jul 29, 2023	1 1/8 miles	Jim Dandy Stakes	II	Saratoga	3.50	5	2	1:49.61	(nose)	Florent Geroux	
Sep 23, 2023	1 1/8 miles	Pennsylvania Derby	I	Parx	1.10*	11	1	1:50.62	1/2 length	Florent Geroux	
Nov 4, 2023	1 1/4 miles	Breeders' Cup Classic	I	Santa Anita	7.30	12	10	2:02.87	(12 3/4 lengths)	Florent Geroux	
2023 – four-year-old season
Jan 20, 2024	1 1/16 miles	Louisiana Stakes	III	Fair Grounds	0.70*	6	1	1:43.20	5 3/4 lengths	Florent Geroux	
Feb 24, 2024	1800 metres	Saudi Cup	I	King Abdulaziz Racetrack	N/A (Note: Wagering is not allowed in Saudi Arabia. In British wagering, Saudi Crown started at 25/1 odds)	14	3	1:49.50	(1 length)	Florent Geroux	
Mar 30, 2024	1600 metres	Godolphin Mile	II	Meydan	N/A (Note: Wagering is not allowed in the United Arab Emirates. In British wagering, Saudi Crown started at 5/6 odds-on)	13	12	1:49.50	(21 3/4 lengths)	Florent Geroux	
Aug 11, 2024	1 mile	R.A. "Cowboy" Jones Stakes		Ellis Park	0.68*	10	1	1:36.57	1 3/4 lengths	Florent Geroux	
Nov 2, 2024	1 mile	Breeders' Cup Dirt Mile	I	Del Mar	7.10	13	13	1:35.48	(58 lengths)	Florent Geroux	
Dec 21, 2024	1 1/16 miles	Tenacious Stakes	Listed	Fair Grounds	1.10*	8	1	1:42.35	2 lengths	Florent Geroux	
2025 – five-year-old season
Jan 25, 2025	1 1/8 miles	Pegasus World Cup	I	Gulfstream Park	4.00	11	5	1:48.05	(8 3/4 lengths)	Florent Geroux	
Mar 29, 2025	1 mile	Oaklawn Mile Stakes	III	Oaklawn Park	1.00*	6	2	1:36.77	(1 length)	Florent Geroux	
May 3, 2025	1 1/16 miles	Lake Ouachita Stakes		Oaklawn Park	0.50*	6	1	1:42.25	nose	Abel Cedillo	
Jun 29, 2025	1 mile	Hanshin Stakes	Listed	Churchill Downs	1.59*	8	7	1:34.10	(10 1/4 lengths)	Florent Geroux	
2026 – six-year-old season
Mar 5, 2026	1 1/16 miles	Ratings Handicap		Oaklawn Park	0.40*	4	1	1:42.88	1 length	Luis Saez	
Apr 16, 2026	7 furlongs	Commonwealth Stakes	III	Keeneland	1.01*	6	1	1:22.56	2 3/4 lengths	Flavien Prat	

Notes:
An (*) asterisk after the odds means Saudi Crown was the post-time favorite.

== Pedigree ==
Pedigree of Saudi Crown, gray or roan colt, February 9, 2020
Sire Always Dreaming (2014)	Bodemeister (2009)	Empire Maker (2000)	Unbridled (1987)
Sire Always Dreaming (2014)	Bodemeister (2009)	Empire Maker (2000)	Toussaud (1989)
Sire Always Dreaming (2014)	Bodemeister (2009)	Untouched Talent (2004)	Storm Cat (1983)
Sire Always Dreaming (2014)	Bodemeister (2009)	Untouched Talent (2004)	Parade Queen (1994)
Sire Always Dreaming (2014)	Above Perfection (1998)	In Excess (IRE) (1987)	Siberian Express (1981)
Sire Always Dreaming (2014)	Above Perfection (1998)	In Excess (IRE) (1987)	Kantado (1976)
Sire Always Dreaming (2014)	Above Perfection (1998)	Something Perfect (1980)	Somethingfabulous (1972)
Sire Always Dreaming (2014)	Above Perfection (1998)	Something Perfect (1980)	Happening (1967)
Dam New Narration (2015)	Tapit (2001)	Pulpit (1994)	A.P. Indy (1989)
Dam New Narration (2015)	Tapit (2001)	Pulpit (1994)	Preach (1989)
Dam New Narration (2015)	Tapit (2001)	Tap Your Heels (1996)	Unbridled (1987)
Dam New Narration (2015)	Tapit (2001)	Tap Your Heels (1996)	Ruby Slippers (1982)
Dam New Narration (2015)	New Normal (2008)	Forestry (1998)	Storm Cat (1983)
Dam New Narration (2015)	New Normal (2008)	Forestry (1998)	Shared Interest (1988)
Dam New Narration (2015)	New Normal (2008)	New Economy (1998)	Red Ransom (1987)
Dam New Narration (2015)	New Normal (2008)	New Economy (1998)	Sunyata (1989) (family 12-c)

- Saudi Crown is inbred 4s x 4d to Unbridled and 4s x 4d to Storm Cat.
