= 2017 Road to the Kentucky Derby =

Preliminary races prior to 2017 Kentucky Derby

The 2017 Road to the Kentucky Derby was a series of races through which horses qualified for the 2017 Kentucky Derby, which was held on May 6. The field for the Derby was limited to 20 horses, with up to four 'also eligibles' in case of a late withdrawal from the field.

The Road to the Kentucky Derby gives points to the top four finishers in specified races. The 2017 season consisted of 35 races, 19 races for the Kentucky Derby Prep Season and 16 races for the Kentucky Derby Championship Season. Earnings in non-restricted stakes acted as a tie breaker. The races for the 2017 series were mostly the same as in the 2016 series, except that the Sam F. Davis stakes replaced the Iroquois Stakes.

On September 12, 2016, Churchill Downs announced the introduction of a separate Japan Road to the Kentucky Derby, which consisted of two races: the Cattleya Sho on November 26, 2016, and the Hyacinth on February 19, 2017. The winner of this series was offered one of the 20 positions available in the Kentucky Derby starting gate. However, the offer was declined by the connections of the winner, Epicharis, and those of the two runners-up. Therefore, all 20 positions and the 'also eligibles' were determined through the regular Road to the Kentucky Derby.

== Standings ==
The following table shows the points earned in the eligible races. Entries for the Kentucky Derby were taken on May 3. The race was won by Always Dreaming.

As of May 3, 2017

Rank	Horse	Points	Earnings (Note: Earnings from non-restricted stakes prior to the running of the Kentucky Derby serve as a tie-breaker.)	Trainer	Owner	Ref
1	Girvin	150	$849,800	Joe Sharp	Brad Grady	
2	Classic Empire	132	$2,093,820	Mark Casse	John C. Oxley	
3	Gormley	125	$884,000	John Shirreffs	Jerry and Ann Moss	
4	Irap	113	$760,000	Doug O'Neill	Reddam Racing	
5	Irish War Cry	110	$676,660	H. Graham Motion	Isabelle de Tomaso	
6	Thunder Snow (IRE)	100	$1,621,063	Saeed bin Suroor	Godolphin Racing	
**7**	**Always Dreaming**	**100**	**$589,000**	**Todd Pletcher**	**Brooklyn Boyz Stables, MeB Racing, St Elias Stables et al.**	
8	Gunnevera	84	$1,137,800	Antonio Sano	Peacock Racing	
9	Practical Joke	74	$966,000	Chad Brown	Klaravich Stables & William Lawrence	
10	J Boys Echo	63	$305,000	Dale Romans	Albaugh Family Stables	
11	State of Honor	62	$310,564	Mark Casse	Conrad Farms	
injured	Mastery	60	$480,000	Bob Baffert	Cheyenne Stables	
not nominated	Conquest Mo Money	60	$370,000	Miguel Hernandez	Judge Lanier Racing	
12	Tapwrit	54	$325,570	Todd Pletcher	Bridlewood Farm, Eclipse Thoroughbred & Robert LaPenta	
bypass	Malagacy	50	$570,000	Todd Pletcher	Sumaya U.S. Stable	
13	Hence	50	$401,129	Steve Asmussen	Calumet Farm	
14 (Note: Although not Triple Crown nominated, the owner of Fast and Accurate paid a late supplement fee of $200,000)	Fast and Accurate	50	$320,712	Michael Maker	Kendall Hansen	
declined (Note: Although Epicharis also automatically qualified via the separate Japan Road to the Kentucky Derby, the horse returned to Japan)	Epicharis (JPN)	40	$851,195	Kiyoshi Hagiwara	U Carrot Farm	
15	McCraken	40	$385,048	Ian Wilkes	Whitham Thoroughbreds	
16	Battle of Midway	40	$224,000	Jerry Hollendorfer	Fox Hill Farms	
17	Patch	40	$200,000	Todd Pletcher	Calumet Farm	
bypass	Battalion Runner	40	$140,000	Todd Pletcher	St. Elias Stable	
bypass	Cloud Computing	40	$115,000	Chad Brown	Klaravich Stables & William Lawrence	
18	Untrapped	34	$210,000	Steve Asmussen	Michael Langford	
19	Lookin At Lee	32	$428,600	Steve Asmussen	L and N Racing	
injured	El Areeb	30	$330,000	Cathal Lynch	M M G Stables	
20	Sonneteer	30	$236,000	J. Keith Desormeaux	Calumet Farm	
21	Royal Mo	30	$213,000	John Shirreffs	Jerry & Ann Moss	
-	Local Hero	30	$140,000	Steven M. Asmussen	e Five Racing Thoroughbreds	
-	Iliad	20	$220,000	Doug O'Neill	Kaleem Shah	
22	Master Plan	20	$214,700	Todd Pletcher	Al Shaqab Racing, Winstar Farm & China Horse Club	
-	Blueridge Traveler	20	$95,000	Kenneth McPeek	Horizon Stables	
injured	Not This Time	18	$430,210	Dale Romans	Albaugh Family	
-	Wild Shot	17	$132,200	George Arnold	Calumet Farm	
-	True Timber	16	$124,000	Kiaran McLaughlin	Calumet Farm	
-	Guest Suite	15	$144,040	Neil Howard	Farish and Kilroy	
-	Petrov	13	$195,000	Ron Moquett	Rialto Racing & Southern Springs Stables	
-	No Dozing	12	$126,500	Arnaud Delacour	Lael Stables	
-	Term of Art	11	$119,000	Doug O'Neill	Calumet Farm	
-	Uncontested	11	$99,300	Wayne Catalano	Lapenta & Rosenblum	
-	Lancaster Bomber	10	$417,430	Aidan O'Brien	Tabor, Smith & Magnier	
	One Liner	10	$300,000	Todd Pletcher	WinStar Farm, China Horse Club & SF Racing	
-	Mo Town	10	$188,000	Anthony W. Dutrow	Magnier, Tabor, Smith, Team D	
-	Senior Investment	10	$130,000	Kenneth McPeek	Fern Circle Stables	
-	Zakaroff	10	$120,000	Steven Specht	Antone Metaxas	
-	Three Rules	10	$142,240	Jose Pinchin	Shade Tree Thoroughbreds	
euthanized	Reach the World	10	$50,000	Bob Baffert	Don Alberto Stable	
-	Convict Pike	10	$47,500	George R. Arnold	Ashbrook Farm	
-	Hollywood Handsome	10	$40,000	Dallas Stewart	Mark H. Stanley	
-	Talk Logistics	6	$60,100	Edward Plesa Jr.	Hardway Stables	
	Bonus Points	5	$52,500	Todd Pletcher	Three Diamonds Farm	
-	Action Everyday	5	$15,000	St. Elias Stable	Todd Pletcher	
bypass	Klimt	4	$380,000	Bob Baffert	Kaleem Shah	
-	Hot Sean	4	$180,000	Bob Baffert	Watson, Pegram & Weilman	
-	Dangerfield	4	$171,500	Doug O'Neill	WC Racing & Zayat Stables	
-	Syndergaard	4	$160,000	Todd Pletcher	Fein, McKenna, et al.	
-	More Power to Him	4	$40,000	Faith Taylor	Brett Mason	
-	American Anthem	4	$23,000	Bob Baffert	WinStar Farm, S F Bloodstock & China Horse Club	
-	Warrior's Club	3	$27,528	Wayne Catalano	Churchill Downs Racing Club	
-	Straight Fire	2	$96,000	J. Keith Desormeaux	Jungle Racing et al.	
-	Recruiting Ready	2	$52,025	Horacio DePaz	Sagamore Farm	
-	Favorable Outcome	2	$50,345	Chad Brown	Klaravich Stables & William Lawrence	
-	Rowdy the Warrior	2	$34,429	Donnie Von Hemel	Robert Zoellner	
-	Takaful	2	$31,500	Kiaran McLaughlin	Shadwell Stable	
-	Tribal Storm	2	$24,000	Ed Moger Jr.	Curt and Lila Lanning	
-	Win With Pride	2	$22,500	Todd Pletcher	Repole & St Elias Stables	
-	Takeoff	2	$20,000	Mark Casse	John Oxley	
-	Sheer Flattery	2	$18,000	Jerry Hollendorfer	Barrow, Robertson & Hollendorfer	
-	Big Hit	2	$12,000	Philip D'Amato	Gary & Mary West	
-	Midnight Pleasure	1	$54,000	Shelbe Ruis	Ruis Racing	
	Silver Dust	1	$54,857	Randy L. Morse	Tom Durant	
-	Big Gray Rocket	1	$25,000	Bob Baffert	Frank Fletcher Racing	
-	Ann Arbor Eddie	1	$32,000	Doug O'Neill	Reddam Racing	
-	Bobby Abu Dhabi	1	$18,000	Peter Miler	Rockingham Ranch	
-	Arklow	1	$8,000	Brad H. Cox	Donegal Racing	

- Winner of Kentucky Derby in **bold**
- Entrants for Kentucky Derby in blue
- "Also eligible" for Kentucky Derby in green
- Sidelined/Inactive/No longer under Derby Consideration/Not nominated in gray

== Prep season ==
Note: 1st=10 points; 2nd=4 points; 3rd=2 points; 4th=1 point (except the Breeders' Cup Juvenile: 1st=20 points; 2nd=8 points; 3rd=4 points; 4th=2 point)

Race	Distance	Purse	Track	Date	1st	2nd	3rd	4th	Ref
Iroquois	1-1/16 miles	$150,000	Churchill Downs	Sep 17 2016	Not This Time	Lookin At Lee	Recruiting Ready	Honor Thy Father	
FrontRunner	1-1/16 miles	$300,000	Santa Anita	Oct 1 2016	Gormley	Klimt	Straight Fire	Midnight Pleasure	
Champagne	1-mile	$300,000	Belmont	Oct 8 2016	Practical Joke	Syndergaard	Favorable Outcome	Big Gray Rocket	
Breeders' Futurity	1-1/16 miles	$400,000	Keeneland	Oct 8 2016	Classic Empire	Lookin at Lee	Wild Shot	No Dozing	
Breeders' Cup Juvenile	1-1/16 miles	$2,000,000	Santa Anita	Nov 5 2016	Classic Empire	Not This Time	Practical Joke	Lookin at Lee	
Delta Downs Jackpot	1-1/16 miles	$1,000,000	Delta Downs	Nov 19 2016	Gunnevera	Hot Sean	Dangerfield	J Boys Echo	
Remsen	1-1/8 miles	$300,000	Aqueduct	Nov 26 2016	Mo Town	No Dozing	Takaful	Win With Pride	
Kentucky Jockey Club	1-1/16 miles	$150,000	Churchill Downs	Nov 26 2016	McCraken	Wild Shot	Warrior's Club	Uncontested	
Los Alamitos Futurity	1-1/16 miles	$500,000	Los Alamitos	Dec 10 2016	Mastery	Irap	Dangerfield	Bobby Abu Dhai	
Jerome	1-mile 70 yards	$200,000	Aqueduct	Jan 2 2017	El Areeb	Bonus Points	True Timber	Win With Pride	
Sham	1-mile	$100,000	Santa Anita	Jan 7 2017	Gormley	American Anthem	Big Hit	Bird Is The Word	
Smarty Jones	1-mile	$150,000	Oaklawn	Jan 16 2017	Uncontested	Petrov	Rowdy the Warrior	Warrior's Club	
Lecomte	1-mile 70 yards	$200,000	Fair Grounds	Jan 21 2017	Guest Suite	Untrapped	Takeoff	Arklow	
Holy Bull	1-1/16 miles	$350,000	Gulfstream	Feb 4 2017	Irish War Cry	Gunnevera	Classic Empire	Talk Logistics	
Withers	1-1/16 miles	$200,000	Aqueduct	Feb 4 2017	El Areeb	True Timber	J Boys Echo	Bonus Points	
Robert B. Lewis	1-1/16 miles	$150,000	Santa Anita	Feb 4 2017	Royal Mo	Irap	Sheer Flattery	Term of Art	
Sam F. Davis Stakes	1-1/16 miles	$150,000	Tampa Bay	Feb 11 2017	McCraken	Tapwrit	State of Honor	Wild Shot	
El Camino Real Derby	1-1/8 miles	$200,000	Golden Gate	Feb 18 2017	Zakaroff	More Power to Him	Tribal Storm	Ann Arbor Eddie (Note: Disqualified from 2nd to 4th)	
Southwest	1-1/16 miles	$500,000	Oaklawn	Feb 20 2017	One Liner	Petrov	Lookin At Lee	Silver Dust	

== Championship series ==
=== First leg of series ===
Note: 1st=50 points; 2nd=20 points; 3rd=10 points; 4th=5 points

Race	Distance	Purse	Track	Date	1st	2nd	3rd	4th	Ref
Risen Star	1-1/16 miles	$400,000	Fair Grounds	Feb 25 2017	Girvin	Untrapped	Local Hero	Guest Suite	
Fountain of Youth	1-1/16 miles	$400,000	Gulfstream	Mar 4 2017	Gunnevera	Practical Joke	Three Rules	Talk Logistics	
Gotham	1-1/16 miles	$500,000	Aqueduct	Mar 4 2017	J Boys Echo	Cloud Computing	El Areeb	Action Everyday	
Tampa Bay Derby	1-1/16 miles	$350,000	Tampa Bay	Mar 11 2017	Tapwrit	State of Honor	Wild Shot	No Dozing	
San Felipe	1-1/16 miles	$300,000	Santa Anita	Mar 11 2017	Mastery	Iliad	Term of Art	Gormley	
Rebel	1-1/16 miles	$900,000	Oaklawn	Mar 18 2017	Malagacy	Sonneteer	Untrapped	Petrov	
Spiral	1-1/8 miles	$500,000	Turfway	Mar 25 2017	Fast and Accurate	Blueridge Traveler	Convict Pike	Kitten's Cat	
Sunland Derby	1-1/8 miles	$800,000	Sunland Park	Mar 26 2017	Hence	Conquest Mo Money	Hedge Fund	Irap	

=== Second leg of series ===
These races are the major preps for the Kentucky Derby, and are thus weighted more heavily. Note: 1st=100 points; 2nd=40 points; 3rd=20 points; 4th=10 points

Race	Distance	Purse	Track	Date	1st	2nd	3rd	4th	Ref
UAE Derby	1,900 metres ~1-3/16 miles	$2,000,000	Meydan	Mar 25 2017	Thunder Snow (IRE)	Epicharis (JPN)	Master Plan	Lancaster Bomber	
Louisiana Derby	1-1/8 miles	$1,000,000	Fair Grounds	Apr 1 2017	Girvin	Patch	Local Hero	Hollywood Handsome	
Florida Derby	1-1/8 miles	$1,000,000	Gulfstream	Apr 1 2017	Always Dreaming	State of Honor	Gunnevera	Impressive Edge	
Wood Memorial	1-1/8 miles	$750,000	Aqueduct	Apr 8 2017	Irish War Cry	Battalion Runner	Cloud Computing	True Timber	
Blue Grass Stakes	1-1/8 miles	$1,000,000	Keeneland	Apr 8 2017	Irap	Practical Joke	McCraken	J Boys Echo	
Santa Anita Derby	1-1/8 miles	$1,000,000	Santa Anita	Apr 8 2017	Gormley	Battle of Midway	Royal Mo	Reach the World	
Arkansas Derby	1-1/8 miles	$1,000,000	Oaklawn Park	Apr 15 2017	Classic Empire	Conquest Mo Money	Lookin At Lee	Sonneteer	

"Wild Card"

Note: 1st=10 points; 2nd=4 points; 3rd=2 points; 4th=1 point

Race	Distance	Purse	Track	Date	1st	2nd	3rd	4th	Ref
Lexington	1-1/8 miles	$200,000	Keeneland	Apr 15 2017	Senior Investment	West Coast	No Dozing	Time to Travel	

== Japan Road to the Kentucky Derby ==
The Japan Road to the Kentucky Derby is intended to provide a place in the Derby starting gate to the top finisher in the series. If the connections of that horse decline the invitation, their place is offered to the second-place finisher and if necessary to the third-place finisher. If neither of the top three accept, this place in the starting gate reverts to the 20th-place finisher on the regular road to the Derby. For 2017, the top three-finishers in the Japan Road declined the offer.

Rank	Horse	Points	Trainer	Owner	Ref
1	Epicharis	50	Kiyoshi Hagiwara	U Carrot Farm	
2	Mont Saint Legame	40	Koji Maki	Shinichi Yamashita	
3	Adirato	20	Naosuke Sugai	Koji Yasuhara	
4	Caucus	16	Hideaki Fujiwara	Sheikh Mohammed bin Rashid Al Maktoum	
5	Hypernova	10	Hiroyuki Oneda	Junzo Miyakawa	
6	Blanc Eclat	8	Ryo Takei	KT Racing	
7	Foggy Night	5	Noriyuki Hori	Kaneko Makoto Holdings	
8	Lavapies	4	Ryuki Okubo	Silk Racing	

Race	Distance	Track	Date	1st	2nd	3rd	4th	Ref
Cattleya Sho	1,600 m (about 1 mile)	Tokyo Racecourse	Nov 26 2016	Mont Saint Legame	Caucus	Blanc Eclat	Lavapies	
Hyacinth	1,600 m (about 1 mile)	Tokyo Racecourse	Feb 19, 2017	Epicharis	Adirato	Hyper Nova	Foggy Night	

Note: Cattleya Sho: 1st=40 points; 2nd=16 points; 3rd=8 points; 4th=4 points Note: Hyacinth: 1st=50 points; 2nd=20 points; 3rd=10 points; 4th=5 points

== See also ==
- 2017 Road to the Kentucky Oaks
