= Jorge Carreño Luengas =

Colombian jurist (1929–2022)

Jorge Carreño Luengas (1929 – 13 April 2022) was a Colombian jurist who served as President of the Supreme Court.
