= Gormley (horse) =

American-bred Thoroughbred racehorse

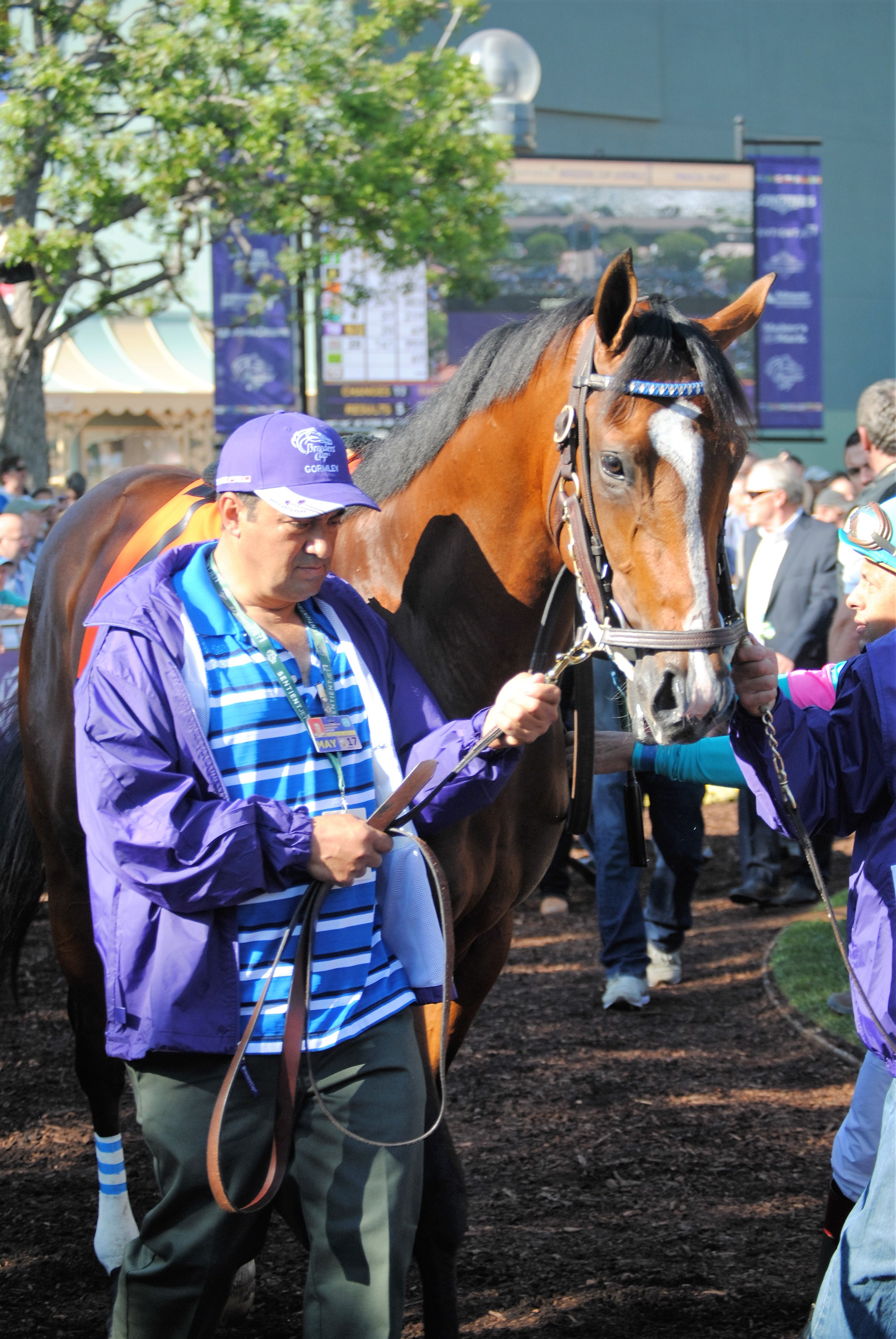
- Gormley at the 2016 Breeders' Cup Juvenile
- Sire: Malibu Moon
- Grandsire: A.P. Indy
- Dam: Race to Urga
- Damsire: Bernstein
- Sex: Stallion
- Foaled: March 20, 2014
- Country: United States
- Colour: Bay
- Breeder: Castleton Lyons & Kilboy Estate
- Owner: Jerry and Ann Moss
- Trainer: John Shirreffs
- Record: 9: 4-0-0
- Earnings: $1,026,000

Major wins
- FrontRunner Stakes (2016); Sham Stakes (2017); Santa Anita Derby (2017)
- Last updated on September 23, 2017

Gormley (foaled March 20, 2014, in Kentucky) is a two-time Grade I winning-American Thoroughbred racehorse. One of the leading contenders on the 2017 Road to the Kentucky Derby, Gormley finished ninth in the Derby and fourth in the Belmont Stakes. He was retired in October 2017 to Spendthrift Farm, where his sire, Malibu Moon also stood.

== Background ==
Gormley is a bay stallion with a thin blaze and a sock on his left-hind leg. His sire is Malibu Moon, best known as the sire of Kentucky Derby winner Orb. He is the first foal out of Race to Urga, a stakes winner by Bernstein. Gormley was bred by Castleton Lyons & Kilboy Estate and was entered in the Keeneland September Sale as a yearling, but did not reach his reserve price of $150,000. He was then purchased privately after the sale by Jerry and Ann Moss.

Gormley is named after British sculptor Antony Gormley. "It was a name I was familiar with from my many trips to England," said Ann Moss. "I've tried to buy a few of his sculptures, but I couldn't get it done."

== 2016: two-year-old season ==
Gormley made his debut in a Maiden Special Weight on September 9, and won impressively by 4 1/4 lengths. He was ridden by jockey Victor Espinoza, who had worked with him through the summer. His trainer, John Shirreffs, was so impressed with him that he entered him in the Grade I FrontRunner Stakes off his maiden victory, where he was sent off at odds of 10.80-1. Gormley broke well, went to the lead on the first turn, and led the rest of the way. His winning margin was three lengths over the well-regarded Klimt, winner of the Del Mar Futurity. After the race, Shirreffs stated: "He looks like a million bucks, he's a beautiful horse and he's doing really well. I like that when he got into that big gear he has, he didn't get too excited for a young horse and today he was all business."

On November 5, Gormley ran in the Breeders' Cup Juvenile at Santa Anita, as third choice in a field of eleven that was considered fairly evenly matched. He bobbled at the break, then moved into fifth while racing four wide. Rounding the final turn, he started to drop back, eventually finishing seventh.

== 2017: three-year-old season ==
Gormley began his three-year-old campaign on January 7, 2017, by winning the one-mile Sham Stakes at Santa Anita Park, where he was the second choice behind the highly regarded colt American Anthem, who was making his second career start. On a sloppy track, Gormley broke quickly and took the early lead, but then settled and let American Anthem take the lead. Gormley raced in second, about a length behind. Down the backstretch, Gormley moved alongside and the two horses fought for the lead around the far turn. Gormley started to pull ahead a little in mid-stretch, but American Anthem battled back, and the two dueled to the wire, with Gormley prevailing to win by a short head. After the race, Shirreffs said: "He's quick. He starts quick and he gets away quickly, but then he checks himself as he gets into the race and he relaxes. It was great to see him pick it back up again and get it done."

After his win in the Sham Stakes, Gormley was entered in the San Felipe Stakes, also at Santa Anita, on March 11. After stalking most of the race, he faded during the homestretch, finishing fourth behind Term of Art, Iliad, and winner Mastery. Gormley raced in the Santa Anita Derby, one of the major Kentucky Derby preps. Despite his San Felipe run, he was liked by the bettors and was installed at 9/2 odds for the morning line. With American Anthem, Battle of Midway, and stablemate Royal Mo engaged in a speed duel in front, Espinoza altered his tactics and had Gormley stalk from behind. As they entered the stretch, Gormley started to rally past his tiring rivals, winning by a half-length. Espinoza noted: "He works really hard and that's what it takes."

After his win, B. Wayne Hughes announced that he had purchased Gormley's breeding rights, and that he will stand Gormley at his Spendthrift Farm when he retires from racing. Spendthrift Farm also owns Gormley's sire, Malibu Moon, who is the sire of Kentucky Derby winner Orb.

On May 6, Gormley started in the 2017 Kentucky Derby where he was largely dismissed by the bettors at odds of 20-1. Starting from post position in 18 in a field of 20, he was carried four wide around both turns. He started to make a run at the top of the stretch but was bumped slightly and forced to switch paths by Practical Joke, then faded to ninth. Espinoza stated: "I had a great trip, but not enough horse. He never really picked up the bridle."

Gormley made his next start in the Belmont Stakes, and was made 8-1 on morning line odds. Gormley raced near the early pace and mounted a challenge around the far turn but tired down the stretch to finish fourth, four lengths behind third-place runner Patch, and eight lengths in front of fifth-place finisher Senior Investment.

On August 26, Gormley raced in the ungraded Shared Belief Stakes at Del Mar. He broke well, stayed in fourth position on the backstretch and far turn, but never threatened the leaders, finishing a flat fourth, beaten 10 3/4 lengths by winner Battle of Midway. Espinoza said: "He ran all right. I think he needed it. He'll be better next time."

== Race record ==
Date	Track	Race	Grade	Distance	Finish	Margin	Time	Odds	Ref
9/4/2016	Del Mar Racetrack	Maiden Special Weight	x	6 1/2 furlongs	1st	4 1/4 lengths	1:17.79	6.70	
10/1/2016	Santa Anita Park	FrontRunner Stakes	I	1 1/16 miles	1st	3 lengths	1:43.57	10.80	
11/5/2016	Santa Anita Park	Breeders' Cup Juvenile	I	1 1/16 miles	7th	(16 1/4) lengths	1:42.60	5.20	
1/7/2017	Santa Anita Park	Sham Stakes	III	1 mile	1st	head	1:35.89	1.60	
3/11/2017	Santa Anita Park	San Felipe Stakes	II	1 1/16 miles	4th	(9 3/4 lengths)	1:42:28	2.10	
4/8/2017	Santa Anita Park	Santa Anita Derby	I	1 1/8 miles	1st	1/2 length	1:51.16	6.20	
5/6/2017	Churchill Downs	Kentucky Derby	I	1 1/4 miles	9th	(14 1/4 lengths)	2:03.59	22.30	
6/10/2017	Belmont Park	Belmont Stakes	I	1 1/2 miles	4th	(12 lengths)	2:30.02	9.10	
8/26/17	Del Mar Racetrack	Shared Belief Stakes	x	1 mile	4th	(10 3/4)	1:35.94	3.20	

== Pedigree ==
Pedigree of Gormley, bay stallion, foaled March 20, 2014
Sire Malibu Moon b. 1997	A. P. Indy dkb/br. 1989	Seattle Slew dkb/br. 1974	Bold Reasoning
Sire Malibu Moon b. 1997	A. P. Indy dkb/br. 1989	Seattle Slew dkb/br. 1974	My Charmer
Sire Malibu Moon b. 1997	A. P. Indy dkb/br. 1989	Weekend Surprise b. 1980	Secretariat
Sire Malibu Moon b. 1997	A. P. Indy dkb/br. 1989	Weekend Surprise b. 1980	Lassie Dear
Sire Malibu Moon b. 1997	Macoumba b. 1992	Mr. Prospector b. 1970	Raise a Native
Sire Malibu Moon b. 1997	Macoumba b. 1992	Mr. Prospector b. 1970	Gold Digger
Sire Malibu Moon b. 1997	Macoumba b. 1992	Maximova (FR) b. 1980	Green Dancer
Sire Malibu Moon b. 1997	Macoumba b. 1992	Maximova (FR) b. 1980	Baracala
Dam Race to Urga b. 2008	Bernstein b. 1997	Storm Cat dkb/br. 1983	Storm Bird
Dam Race to Urga b. 2008	Bernstein b. 1997	Storm Cat dkb/br. 1983	Terlingua
Dam Race to Urga b. 2008	Bernstein b. 1997	La Affirmed b. 1983	Affirmed
Dam Race to Urga b. 2008	Bernstein b. 1997	La Affirmed b. 1983	La Mesa
Dam Race to Urga b. 2008	Miss Mambo dkb/br. 2001	Kingmambo b. 1990	Mr. Prospector
Dam Race to Urga b. 2008	Miss Mambo dkb/br. 2001	Kingmambo b. 1990	Miesque
Dam Race to Urga b. 2008	Miss Mambo dkb/br. 2001	Troika ch. 1994	Strawberry Road (AUS)
Dam Race to Urga b. 2008	Miss Mambo dkb/br. 2001	Troika ch. 1994	Estrapade (Family 23-b)

Gormley is inbred 3x4 to Mr. Prospector, meaning that Mr. Prospector appears once in the third generation and once in the fourth generation of his pedigree.
