= Always Dreaming =

American-bred Thoroughbred racehorse (2014–2024)

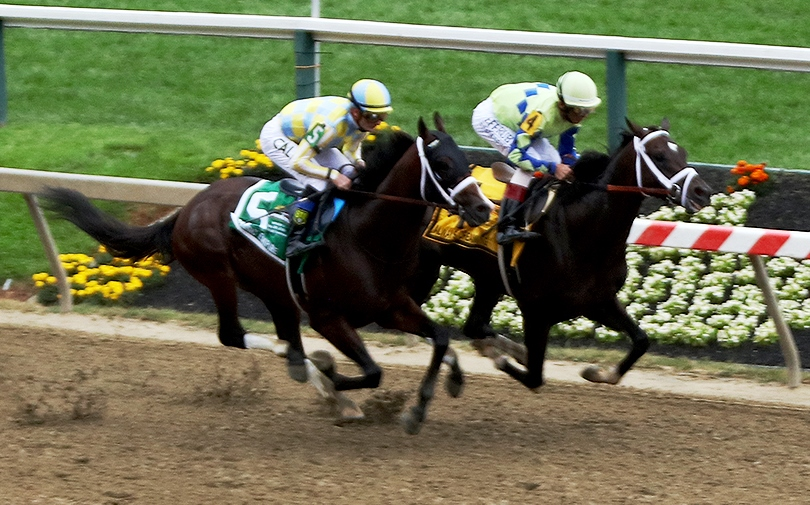
- Always Dreaming (right) next to rival Classic Empire in the Preakness
- Sire: Bodemeister
- Grandsire: Empire Maker
- Dam: Above Perfection
- Damsire: In Excess (IRE)
- Sex: Colt
- Foaled: February 25, 2014
- Died: December 10, 2024 (aged 10)
- Country: United States
- Colour: Dark bay or brown
- Breeder: Santa Rosa Partners
- Owner: MeB Racing, Brooklyn Boyz, Teresa Viola, St. Elias (Vincent Viola), Siena Farm and West Point
- Trainer: Todd Pletcher
- Record: 11: 4-2-2
- Earnings: $2,415,860

Major wins
- Florida Derby (2017); American Triple Crown wins: Kentucky Derby (2017)

Always Dreaming (February 25, 2014 – December 10, 2024) was an American Thoroughbred racehorse who won the 2017 Kentucky Derby and Florida Derby. He had four wins from eleven starts, and earnings of $2,415,860.

== Background ==
Always Dreaming was a dark bay colt who was bred in Kentucky by Santa Rosa Partners (Gerry Dilger and Mike Ryan). He was from the first crop of foals sired by Bodemeister, the runner-up in both the 2012 Kentucky Derby and Preakness Stakes. The dam of Always Dreaming, Above Perfection, was an exceptional sprinter who won the Las Flores Handicap in 2002. Above Perfection's earlier foals include Grade I winner Hot Dixie Chick. Although both Bodemeister and Above Perfection were known for their speed, there are multiple stamina influences further back in the pedigree.

Always Dreaming was sold at the Keeneland September 2015 Yearling Sale for $350,000. He was bought by Anthony Bonomo's Brooklyn Boyz Stables and his wife Mary Ellen's MeB Stables. "My son (Anthony Jr.) was doing the bidding. I was working. I gave him the budget and thank God he went over it," said Bonomo. "I could tell you that two years ago, on the day we bought the horse, I was really upset. You flash forward two years and I can't kiss him enough. He has a keen eye."

In the summer of 2016, Bonomo and Vincent Viola, both long-time racing fans from Brooklyn, decided to join forces, a move that affected the ownership of Always Dreaming. Viola owns St. Elias Stable and his wife is the owner of Teresa Viola Racing Stable. "I'm a couple of years older (than Bonomo), but we played baseball together and, you know each other from the neighborhood," said Viola before the 2017 Kentucky Derby. "When I got back into the Thoroughbreds, I called Anthony. We were doing the same thing separately, so we decided to do it together, and that's exactly what you see here."

In early 2017, the Bonomos and Violas sold a minority interest in Always Dreaming to West Point Thoroughbreds and Siena Farm.

Originally trained by Dominick Schettino, Always Dreaming was transferred to the barn of Todd Pletcher in September 2016.

Always Dreaming died from colic on December 10, 2024, at the age of 10.

== Racing career ==
=== 2016: two-year-old season ===
Always Dreaming raced twice at age two, finishing third in his debut on July 1, 2016, at Belmont Park and second in his next start at Saratoga on August 20.

In September, Always Dreaming was transferred to the barn of Todd Pletcher, who decided the colt would benefit from some time off. When Always Dreaming returned to training, Pletcher could see an improvement. "We could see right away," he said, "as soon as we were breezing him, that he had extra special talent."

=== 2017: three-year-old season ===
Always Dreaming made his three-year-old debut on January 25, 2017, at Tampa Bay Downs as the 1:5 favorite in a maiden special weight race. Pletcher chose the race from among several other maiden races being run on that date based on the distance of 1 1/16 miles, feeling 7 furlongs was too short for the colt but 1 1/8 miles would be too long after such a long layoff. Pletcher also felt lucky to secure the services of jockey John Velazquez, with whom he had a long-term association, for the ride. Always Dreaming raced just off the early pace then drew away from the field to win by 11 1/2 lengths.

His next start was on March 4 in an Allowance Optional Claiming race at Gulfstream Park over a distance of 1 1/8 miles. Pletcher chose this race rather than the Fountain of Youth Stakes held on the same day as part of a plan to keep the colt from peaking too early in the Derby prep season. Starting at odds of 1:10, Always Dreaming set an "almost unbelievably slow pace", then pulled away to win by four lengths.

The lightly raced colt then stepped up to face Grade I company in the Florida Derby on April 1 at Gulfstream. He was the second betting choice at nearly 3:1 behind Kentucky Derby hopeful Gunnevera. Always Dreaming vied for the early lead with Three Rules and State of Honor, then settled into second place down the backstretch. Rounding into the stretch, Always Dreaming kicked away from the rest of the field and won by 5 lengths. His time for the distance of 1 1/8 miles was 1:47.47.

==== Kentucky Derby ====
The Florida Derby win made Always Dreaming one of the leading contenders for the 2017 Kentucky Derby. He shipped to Churchill Downs to train for the race, but attracted concern by his headstrong behavior in his morning workouts. Pletcher changed his exercise rider and added draw reins in an attempt to get the horse to settle. After the second workout with the new equipment, Always Dreaming learned to stop fighting his rider. "The horse is moving fantastic. We want to be able to control that energy and I think we've made big strides in doing that overnight," said Pletcher. "I would much rather be in this position than to come in with a horse not feeling good or hanging his head."

The finish of the 2017 Kentucky Derby.

The 2017 Kentucky Derby was held on May 6 at Churchill Downs over a track that was officially labelled as wet fast. After drawing post position five in a full field of 20 horses, Always Dreaming was made the 5:1 second choice on the morning line by track handicapper Mike Battaglia. When wagering opened, his odds shortened slightly to 9:2, making him the post-time favorite. Always Dreaming broke well and settled just behind the early leader State of Honor with good position on the rail. After half a mile, jockey John R. Velazquez moved him to the outside of State of Honor and the two raced together into the far turn. When other horses then started to challenge for the lead, Always Dreaming quickly responded by drawing away and opening a lead of several lengths in the stretch. Longshot Lookin At Lee made a late run to finish second, but Always Dreaming was never threatened, winning by 2 3/4 lengths. His time was 2:03.59 for the distance of 1 1/4 miles. After the race, Velazquez said, "I got a good position with him early and then he relaxed. When we hit the quarter pole, I asked him and he responded. He did it himself from there."

Always Dreaming became the first horse in 84 years (since Brokers Tip in 1933) to win the Derby having not won a race as a two-year-old; it was late January at age three when he won his first race. Pletcher and Velazquez had worked together many times, and this was the first Kentucky Derby they won together. Velazquez said, "This is the best horse Todd and I have ever come to the Kentucky Derby with. Being behind me for 24 years together, a long time for him to still trust in me and give me the opportunity, it's not very often it happens in this business."

After the race, Mary Ellen Bonomo explained the horse's name. "I just always daydreamed," she said. "And I said, 'Why don’t we just name it Dreaming?' Everybody dreams of something, whether it's a big event or special day, the birth of their child, winning the Kentucky Derby... When this horse has its first baby, we will name it Keep On Dreaming."

==== Remainder of 2017 season ====
Always Dreaming came out of the Derby in good condition and made his next start in the 2017 Preakness Stakes on May 20, with hopes of winning the second jewel of the Triple Crown. In the Preakness, he led from the outset, challenged by Derby rival Classic Empire with Cloud Computing stalking the leading pair. On the final turn, Classic Empire moved to the front and appeared set up to win until Cloud Computing swung wide, brushing Always Dreaming, and in a stretch run, defeated Classic Empire by a head. Always Dreaming tired, ultimately finishing 8th.

The connections of Always Dreaming elected to bypass the 2017 Belmont Stakes in June to give the colt time to recover for the remainder of the racing season. On July 29, he returned in the Jim Dandy Stakes, where he finished third after setting the early pace. On August 26, he finished ninth in the Travers Stakes after pressing the early pace set by the winner West Coast.

Following the race, Always Dreaming was found to be suffering from stomach ulcers and was turned out at WinStar Farm to recuperate.

=== 2018: four-year-old season ===
Always Dreaming made two starts in 2018, finishing second in the Gulfstream Park Hardacre Mile and fifth in the Alysheba Stakes at Churchill Downs. His retirement was announced by Elliott Walden on September 5, 2018.

== Stud career ==
Always Dreaming remained at WinStar Farm where he stood for the 2019 breeding season for a stud fee of $25,000.

In 2023 his son Saudi Crown won the Grade 1 Pennsylvania Derby for his first major success. In 2023 Always Dreaming was standing for $10,000.

On 10 December 2024, Always Dreaming died at River Oaks Farm in Oklahoma, from colic-related complications.

=== Notable progeny ===
c = colt, f = filly, g = gelding

Foaled	Name	Sex	Major Wins
2020	Saudi Crown	c	Pennsylvania Derby (2023)

== Pedigree ==
Pedigree of Always Dreaming, dark bay or brown colt, February 25, 2014
Sire Bodemeister 2009	Empire Maker; 2000	Unbridled	Fappiano
Sire Bodemeister 2009	Empire Maker; 2000	Unbridled	Gana Facil
Sire Bodemeister 2009	Empire Maker; 2000	Toussaud	El Gran Senor
Sire Bodemeister 2009	Empire Maker; 2000	Toussaud	Image of Reality
Sire Bodemeister 2009	Untouched Talent; 2004	Storm Cat	Storm Bird
Sire Bodemeister 2009	Untouched Talent; 2004	Storm Cat	Terlingua
Sire Bodemeister 2009	Untouched Talent; 2004	Parade Queen	A.P. Indy
Sire Bodemeister 2009	Untouched Talent; 2004	Parade Queen	Spanish Parade
Dam Above Perfection 1998	In Excess (IRE); 1987	Siberian Express	Caro (IRE)
Dam Above Perfection 1998	In Excess (IRE); 1987	Siberian Express	Indian Call
Dam Above Perfection 1998	In Excess (IRE); 1987	Kantado	Saulingo (GB)
Dam Above Perfection 1998	In Excess (IRE); 1987	Kantado	Vi
Dam Above Perfection 1998	Something Perfect; 1980	Somethingfabulous	Northern Dancer
Dam Above Perfection 1998	Something Perfect; 1980	Somethingfabulous	Somethingroyal
Dam Above Perfection 1998	Something Perfect; 1980	Happening	Terrang
Dam Above Perfection 1998	Something Perfect; 1980	Happening	Lazy Mary†

Always Dreaming is inbred 5 × 5 × 4 to Northern Dancer, meaning Northern Dancer appears twice in the fifth generation of his pedigree (as the sire of both El Gran Senor and Storm Bird) and once in the fourth generation.

† Lazy Mary's third dam is Pin Up Girl, from family 4-p.
