= Cloud Computing (horse) =

American-bred Thoroughbred racehorse (foaled 2014)

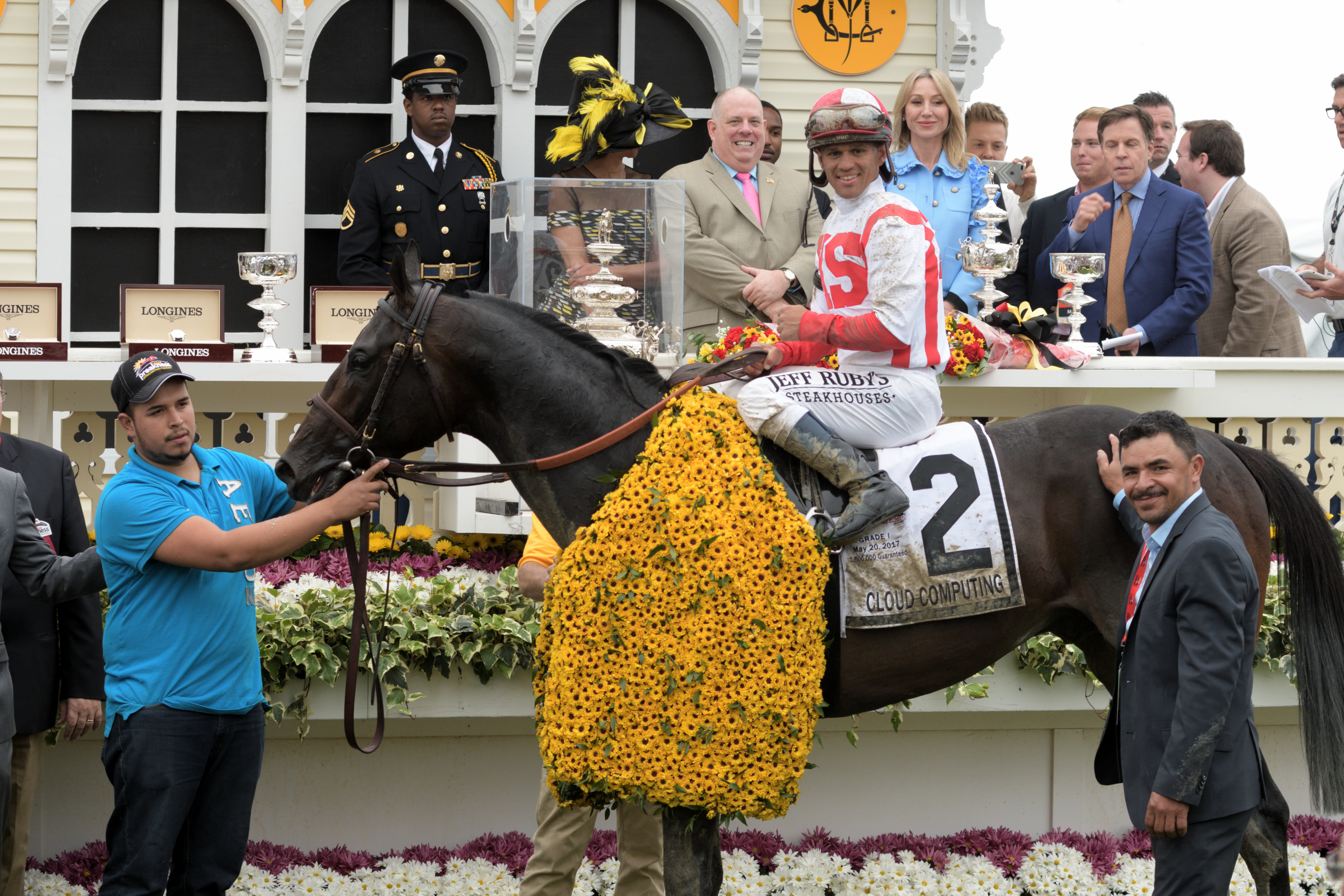
- Cloud Computing with jockey Javier Castellano after winning the 2017 Preakness Stakes.
- Sire: Maclean's Music
- Grandsire: Distorted Humor
- Dam: Quick Temper
- Damsire: A.P. Indy
- Sex: Colt
- Foaled: April 29, 2014
- Country: United States
- Colour: dark bay/brown
- Breeder: Hill 'n' Dale Equine Holdings & Stretch Run Ventures
- Owner: Klaravich Stables & William Lawrence
- Trainer: Chad C. Brown
- Record: 6: 2-1-1
- Earnings: $1,114,000

Major wins
- Triple Crown Race wins: Preakness Stakes (2017)

Cloud Computing (foaled April 29, 2014) is an American Thoroughbred racehorse who won the 2017 Preakness Stakes in only his fourth start.

== Background ==
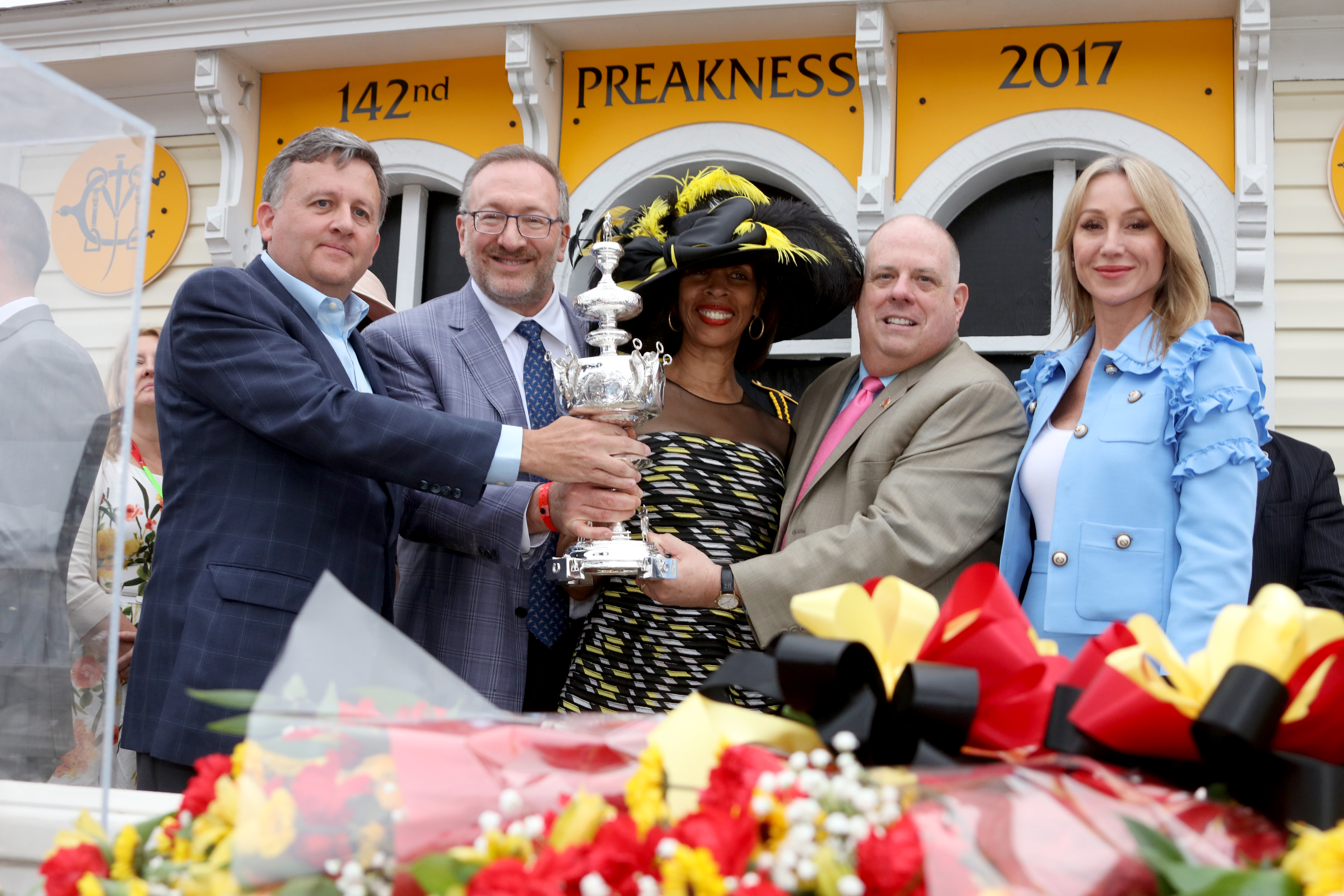
The owners of Cloud Computing pose with the Governor of Maryland and the Woodlawn Vase after winning the Preakness Stakes.

Cloud Computing was bred in Kentucky by Hill 'n' Dale Equine Holdings and Stretch Run Ventures. He is from the first foal crop sired by Maclean's Music, a son of Distorted Humor. Maclean's Music was an impressive winner by 7 1/2 lengths in his only start, a 2011 race for three-year-old maiden horses. and based upon the performances of his first crop of foals, exceeded expectations as a sire. Cloud Computing's dam is Quick Temper, a multiple stakes-placed daughter of A.P. Indy.

Cloud Computing was purchased as a yearling at the 2015 Keeneland Sales for $200,000 by Seth Klarman, the owner of Klaravich Stables, and William Lawrence. Introduced by mutual friends in 2004, the two typically buy about 50–60 horses a year. Both hedge fund managers, they chose his name based upon their pattern of using terms from the finance industry to name their horses, other examples being graded stakes winners Takeover Target and Currency Swap.

He is trained by Chad C. Brown.

== Racing career ==
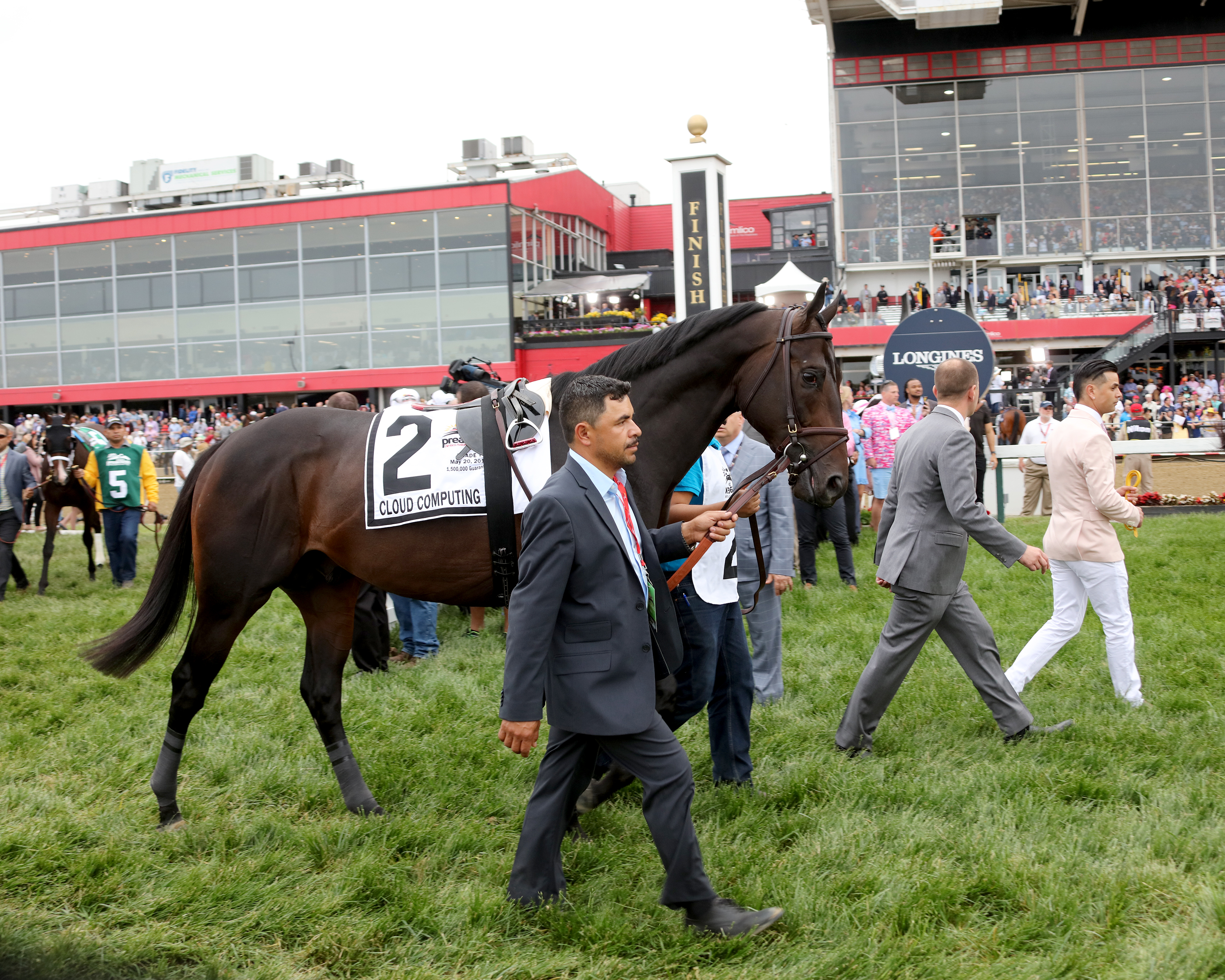
Cloud Computing prior to the Preakness

Cloud Computing did not make his racing debut until February 11, 2017, when, as a three-year-old, he won a maiden special weight at Aqueduct Racetrack. He then finished second to J Boys Echo in the Gotham Stakes and third behind winner Irish War Cry in the Wood Memorial. He earned enough points from these races to qualify on the 2017 Road to the Kentucky Derby. However, his connections elected to bypass the race, instead starting their Champagne Stakes winner, Practical Joke, who finished fifth.

Cloud Computing was one of the more highly regarded "new shooters" for the Preakness Stakes, a race which is typically won by horses who had earlier raced in the Kentucky Derby. The two favorites in the Preakness, Always Dreaming and Classic Empire, had finished first and fourth respectively in the Derby. These two went to an early lead and set a solid pace while Cloud Computing rated a few lengths behind in third. Around the final turn, Classic Empire surged to the front and Always Dreaming dropped back. In mid-stretch, Classic Empire had a three-length lead and looked the likely winner before Cloud Computing angled out from traffic and started closing ground rapidly. Classic Empire tried to rally but could not hold off Cloud Computing, who won by a head.

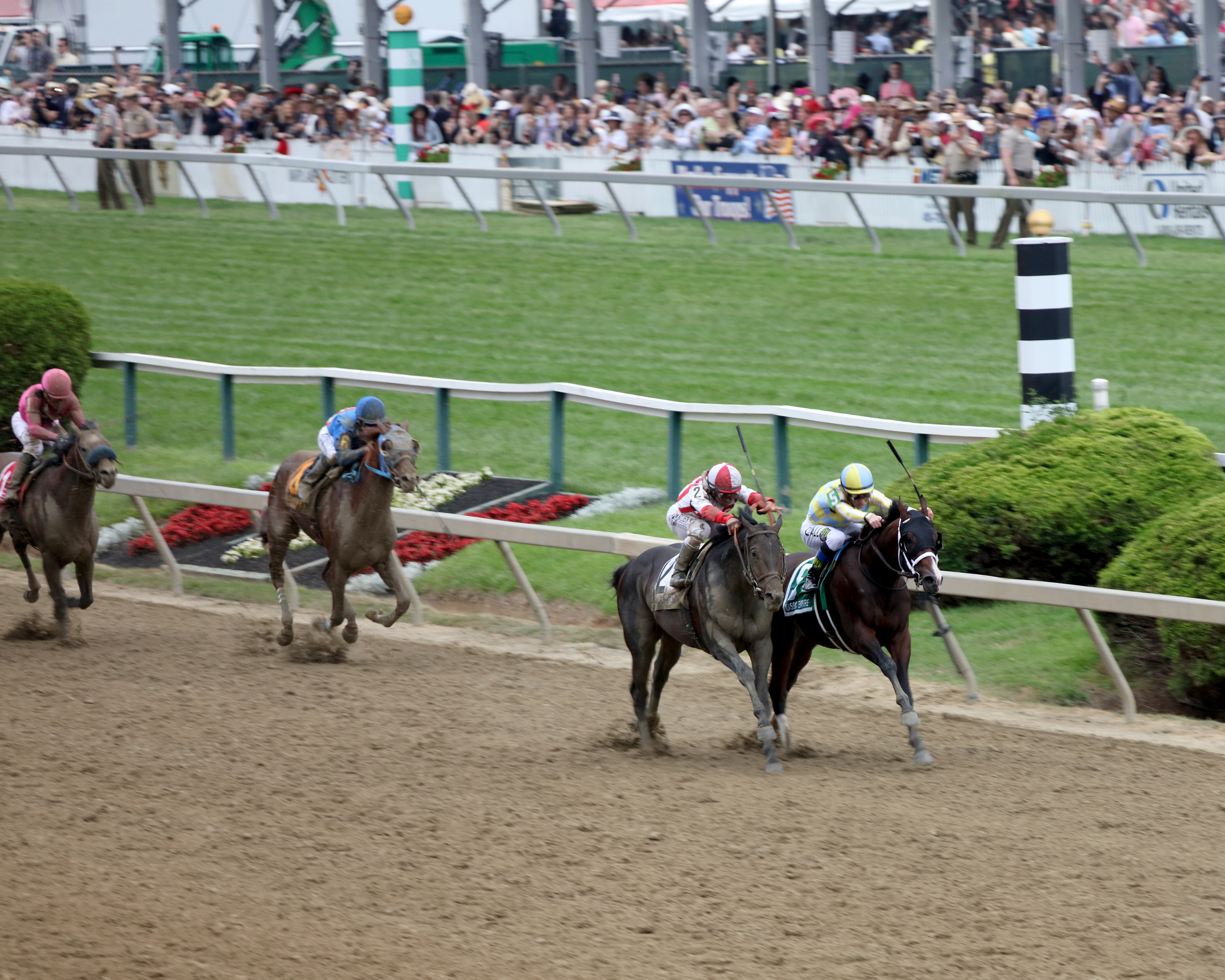
Cloud Computing (on the outside) closes ground on Classic Empire as they near the finish line

Cloud Computing became just the fourth horse in the last 34 years to win the Preakness after not having raced in the Derby. The last horse to do so was the filly Rachel Alexandra in 2009. It was the first win of a Triple Crown race for his trainer Chad Brown and the second for jockey Javier Castellano, who was riding the colt for the first time.

"I'm not going to dispute the fact that I brought in a fresh horse as part of our strategy", said Brown. "Classic Empire and Always Dreaming are two outstanding horses and our strategy was, if we were going to ever beat them, let's take them on two weeks' rest when we have six, and it worked."

"It's incredibly special", said Klarman. "He's a great horse. I have the best trainer and the best jockey going for me. I never imagined it, but I'm thrilled." Klarman had grown up in Baltimore just a few blocks away from Pimlico and attended many runnings of the Preakness including Secretariat's win in 1973.

Cloud Computing was then given some time off before finishing fifth in the Jim Dandy Stakes at Saratoga on July 29. He followed up with an eighth-place finish in the Travers Stakes on August 26.

In his first start as a four-year-old in the 2018 Westchester Stakes at Belmont Park, Cloud Computing was well beaten as the favorite. Trainer Chad Brown announced after the race that the horse would undergo surgery for an ankle chip. Towards the end of the year, in what would end up being his final career race, Cloud Computing finished last in an allowance field at Aqueduct.

== Breeding career ==
Cloud Computing retired to stud in 2019 at Spendthrift Farm for a stud fee of $7,500. In 2022 Spendthrift relocated Cloud Computing to Pin Oak Lane Farm in New Freedom, Pennsylvania. In May 2026 Cloud Computing was purchased by Rodney and Sharon Eckenrode's Equistar Training and Breeding in Annville, Pennsylvania, shortly after the death of Pin Oak Lane Farm owner Dr. William Solomon.

Among Cloud Computing's best racers are I'm Very Busy, a 2020 colt out of Two Kisses that won the Grade II Muniz Memorial Classic Stakes in 2024, and Zajarova, a Group 1 winner in Chile.

== Statistics ==
Date	Age	Distance	Race	Grade	Track	Odds	Field	Finish	Winning Time	Margin Win/(Loss)	Jockey	Ref
Feb 11, 2017	3	6 furlongs	Maiden Special Weight	Maiden	Aqueduct Racetrack	1.15	5	1	1:11.31	1 3/4 lengths	Manuel Franco	
Mar 4, 2017	3	1 1/16 miles	Gotham Stakes	III	Aqueduct Racetrack	7.90	7	2	1:46.34	(3 1/2 lengths)	Manuel Franco	
Apr 8, 2017	3	1 1/8 miles	Wood Memorial	II	Aqueduct Racetrack	2.40	8	3	1:50.91	(7 lengths)	Irad Ortiz Jr.	
May 20, 2017	3	1 3/16 miles	Preakness Stakes	I	Pimlico Racetrack	13.40	10	1	1:55.98	Head	Javier Castellano	
July 29, 2017	3	1 1/8 miles	Jim Dandy Stakes	II	Saratoga	1.20	5	5	1:50.69	(5 1/2 lengths)	Javier Castellano	
Aug 26, 2017	3	1 1/4 miles	Travers Stakes	I	Saratoga	10.90	12	8	2:01.19	(11 1/4 lengths)	Javier Castellano	
May 5, 2018	4	1 mile	Westchester Stakes	III	Belmont	1.15	5	4	1:36.14	(12 1/2 lengths)	Manuel Franco	
Nov 3, 2018	4	1 mile	Allowance Optional Claiming	Allowance	Aqueduct	1.85	7	7	1:37.78	(40 1/4 lengths)	Eric Cancel	

== Pedigree ==
Pedigree of Cloud Computing, dark bay or brown colt, 2014
Sire Maclean's Music (USA) 2008	Distorted Humor (USA); 1993	Forty Niner	Mr. Prospector
Sire Maclean's Music (USA) 2008	Distorted Humor (USA); 1993	Forty Niner	File
Sire Maclean's Music (USA) 2008	Distorted Humor (USA); 1993	Danzig's Beauty	Danzig
Sire Maclean's Music (USA) 2008	Distorted Humor (USA); 1993	Danzig's Beauty	Sweetest Chant
Sire Maclean's Music (USA) 2008	Forest Music (USA); 2001	Unbridled's Song	Unbridled
Sire Maclean's Music (USA) 2008	Forest Music (USA); 2001	Unbridled's Song	Trolley Song
Sire Maclean's Music (USA) 2008	Forest Music (USA); 2001	Defer West	Gone West
Sire Maclean's Music (USA) 2008	Forest Music (USA); 2001	Defer West	Defer
Dam Quick Temper (USA) 2001	A.P. Indy (USA); 1989	Seattle Slew	Bold Reasoning
Dam Quick Temper (USA) 2001	A.P. Indy (USA); 1989	Seattle Slew	My Charmer
Dam Quick Temper (USA) 2001	A.P. Indy (USA); 1989	Weekend Surprise	Secretariat
Dam Quick Temper (USA) 2001	A.P. Indy (USA); 1989	Weekend Surprise	Lassie Dear
Dam Quick Temper (USA) 2001	Halo America (USA); 1990	Waquoit	Relaunch
Dam Quick Temper (USA) 2001	Halo America (USA); 1990	Waquoit	Grey Parlo
Dam Quick Temper (USA) 2001	Halo America (USA); 1990	Ameriangel	Halo
Dam Quick Temper (USA) 2001	Halo America (USA); 1990	Ameriangel	Ameriturn (family: 8-g)
