= John R. Velazquez =

Puerto Rican jockey (born 1971)

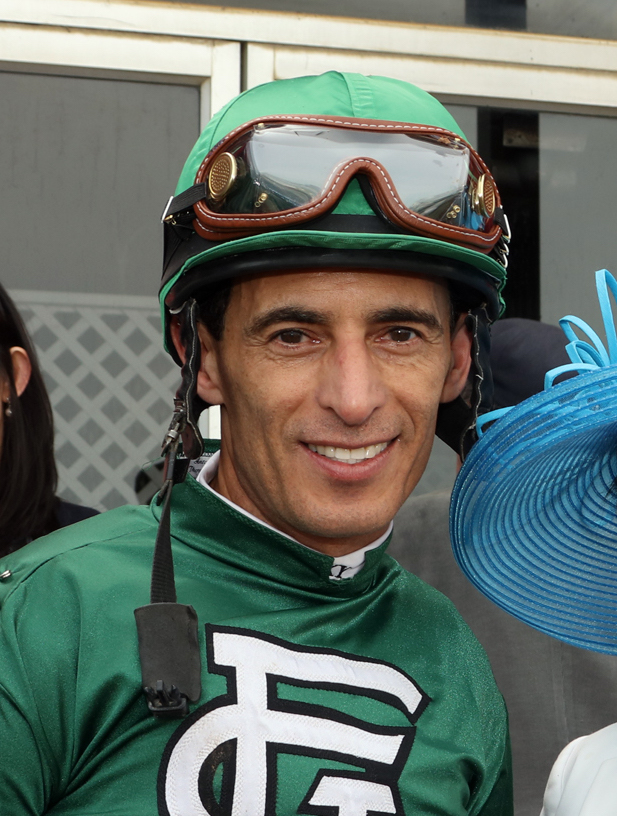
- Velazquez in 2016

Personal information
- Born: November 24, 1971 (age 54) Carolina, Puerto Rico
- Occupation: Jockey
- Height: 1.68 m (5 ft 6 in)
- Weight: 112 lb (51 kg; 8 st 0 lb)

Horse racing career
- Sport: Horse racing
- Career wins: 6,704 in North America As of 26 May 2025

Major racing wins
- American Classic wins: Kentucky Derby (2011, 2017, 2020); Belmont Stakes (2007, 2012); Preakness Stakes (2023); Breeders' Cup wins: Breeders' Cup Juvenile Fillies Turf (2011); Breeders' Cup Marathon (2010); Breeders' Cup Filly & Mare Sprint (2020); Breeders' Cup Sprint (2004); Breeders' Cup Mile (1998, 2012, 2017); Breeders' Cup Distaff (2004, 2017, 2022); Breeders' Cup Juvenile Fillies (2000, 2002); Breeders' Cup Filly & Mare Turf (2002, 2011, 2018); Breeders' Cup Juvenile (2010, 2023); Breeders' Cup Turf (2007, 2014); Breeders' Cup Classic (2020); International race wins: Woodbine Mile (2000, 2005, 2012, 2013, 2017); E. P. Taylor Stakes (2004, 2005, 2011); Dubai World Cup (2005); King's Stand Stakes (2017); King's Plate (2018, 2026); Woodbine Oaks (2026); Grade I stakes wins: Queen Elizabeth II Challenge Cup Stakes (1995, 2005, 2008, 2014, 2016) Joe Hirsch Turf Classic Invitational Handicap (1995, 2004, 2006, 2007, 2012) Futurity Stakes (1996, 1998) Test Stakes (1996, 1999, 2008, 2020) Mother Goose Stakes (1996, 2001, 2007, 2010, 2011, 2014) Ruffian Invitational Handicap (1996, 2004, 2006, 2010) Alabama Stakes (1996, 2003, 2014, 2021) Beldame Stakes (1996, 2005, 2010) Metropolitan Handicap (1996, 1999, 2010, 2012, 2014) Champagne Stakes (1996, 2004, 2006, 2010) Hollywood Derby (1996, 1998, 2017) Sword Dancer Invitational Stakes (1998, 2012, 2023) Flower Bowl Invitational Stakes (1998, 2006, 2012, 2014, 2019) Meadowlands Cup Handicap (1998) Spinaway Stakes (1999, 2015) Acorn Stakes (2000, 2007, 2008, 2015, 2020) Woodbine Mile Stakes (2000, 2005, 2012, 2013, 2017) Vosburgh Stakes (2001, 2006, 2012) Cigar Mile Handicap (2001, 2015) Coaching Club American Oaks (2001, 2004, 2007, 2010, 2015) Matriarch Stakes (2001, 2003) Ashland Stakes (2001) King's Bishop Stakes (2002, 2006, 2010) I’m Matron Stakes (2002) Prioress Stakes (2002, 2008) Ogden Phipps Handicap (2002, 2005, 2010, 2011) Personal Ensign Handicap (2002, 2004, 2012) Frizette Stakes (2002, 2005, 2009, 2012) Whitney Handicap (2002, 2007, 2008, 2013) Donn Handicap (2003, 2010, 2012, 2016) Kentucky Oaks (2004, 2021) E. P. Taylor Stakes (2004, 2005, 2011) Ballerina Stakes (2005, 2012, 2015, 2016) Go for Wand Handicap (2005) Garden City Stakes (2005, 2013) Diana Stakes (2005, 2015, 2018) Blue Grass Stakes (2005, 2015) Travers Stakes (2005, 2019) Forego Stakes (2006, 2009) United Nations Stakes (2006, 2007) Haskell Invitational (2006, 2013, 2020) Woodward Stakes (2007, 2010, 2012, 2013) Copa Velocidad (2008) La Brea Stakes (2008) Clement L. Hirsch Memorial Turf Championship Stakes (2008) Yellow Ribbon Stakes (2008) Carter Handicap (2009, 2011) Madison Stakes (2009, 2014) Florida Derby (2009, 2013, 2015, 2017, 2018, 2024) Wood Memorial Stakes (2010, 2013, 2016) Alcibiades Stakes (2011) Clark Handicap (2011, 2017) Spinster Stakes (2012) Gulfstream Park Turf Handicap (2013) Breeders' Futurity (2013, 2014) Alfred G. Vanderbilt Handicap (2013) Manhattan Handicap (2013) Just a Game Stakes (2013) Man o' War Stakes (2013, 2016, 2017) Maker's 46 Mile Stakes (2014) Hopeful Stakes (2014, 2018) First Lady Stakes (2014, 2018) Turf Classic Stakes (2014) Shadwell Turf Mile Stakes (2014) Apple Blossom Handicap (2015, 2016) Jockey Club Gold Cup (2015, 2016, 2019, 2025) La Troienne Stakes (2016) Jenny Wiley Stakes (2018) Secretariat Stakes (2018) Beverly D. Stakes (2018) Saratoga Derby Invitational Stakes (2021) Pacific Classic Stakes (2025)

Racing awards
- United States Champion Jockey by earnings (2004, 2005); Eclipse Award for Outstanding Jockey (2004, 2005); George Woolf Memorial Jockey Award (2009)

Honours
- National Museum of Racing and Hall of Fame (2012)

Significant horses
- Authentic (racehorse), Da Hoss, Storm Flag Flying, Lemon Drop Kid, Ashado, Kitten's Joy, Flower Alley, Lawyer Ron, Roses in May, Bluegrass Cat, Circular Quay, Scat Daddy, Rags to Riches, Commentator, Indian Blessing, Uncle Mo, Animal Kingdom, Wise Dan, Curalina, Always Dreaming,
- Updated on November 11, 2023

John R. Velazquez (born November 24, 1971) is a Puerto Rican jockey in Thoroughbred horse racing. He pointed out in a 2026 interview that his legal first name is actually "Johnny," which is what is printed on his birth certificate.

He began his career in Puerto Rico and moved to New York in 1990. In 2004 and 2005 he was the United States Champion Jockey by earnings and both years was given the Eclipse Award for Outstanding Jockey. He was inducted into the Horse Racing Hall of Fame in 2012, rode his 5,000th winner in 2013, and became the leading money-earning jockey in the history of the sport in 2014.

A winner of fifteen Breeders' Cup and six Triple Crown races including 2011, 2017, and 2020 Kentucky Derbies, Velázquez has also won major graded stakes races such as the Kentucky Oaks, Metropolitan Handicap, Whitney Handicap, Pacific Classic Stakes, Dubai World Cup, and Woodbine Mile.

== Background ==
Velazquez was born in Carolina, Puerto Rico and learned to ride there, attending a jockey school for a year and a half. On January 3, 1990, he won his first race, aboard Rodas at El Nuevo Comandante racetrack in Canóvanas, Puerto Rico. That same year, he moved to New York State and obtained guidance from leading jockey Angel Cordero Jr. Richie Allen was his first agent, followed in 1992 by Ralph Theroux.

Velazquez initially lived with Cordero and later said that he learned to speak English by watching The Little Mermaid with Cordero's daughter for 2 1/2 months. In 1998, Cordero became his agent. "Without Angel, I wouldn't be here", said Velazquez in 2005. "I learned from him, not just about riding, but everything you need to survive. Since I've been here, he's always been behind me 100%, even when he was still riding."

Velazquez is married to Leona O'Brien, the daughter of trainer Leo O'Brien. Residing in New York, they have two children, a daughter, Lerina, and a son, Michael Patrick.

Velazquez is the chairman of the board of the Jockeys' Guild and on the board of the Permanently Disabled Jockeys Fund. He is known for his cool riding manner and "nerves-of-steel".

== Racing career ==
Soon after moving to the United States in 1990, Velazquez won his first stakes race, the Ticonderoga at Aqueduct Racetrack. His first graded stakes win came the next year in the Ohio Derby aboard Private Man. In 1995, he won his first Grade I stakes race, the Turf Classic Invitational at Belmont. In 1996, he won his first riding title at Aqueduct and also rode his first Eclipse Award winner, Yank's Music, trained by his father-in-law, to Championship Three-Year-Old Filly honors.

In 1998, Velazquez won the first of five riding titles at Saratoga. Later that year, he picked up a ride in the Breeders' Cup Mile on Da Hoss, who had won the 1996 Mile but had only raced once in the intervening years. Da Hoss hit the front of the field with 3/16 of a mile to go but then was passed in mid-stretch. He fought back and won by a head. Track announcer Tom Durkin called it "the greatest comeback since Lazarus." It was Velazquez's first Breeders' Cup victory. Velazquez set a Saratoga record with six wins in one day on September 3, 2001.

In 2004, Velazquez earned his 3,000th win aboard Runningforpresident on July 29 at Saratoga, the same date that Saratoga was holding "John Velazquez Bobblehead Doll Day". He was the leading rider at the Saratoga meet that year with a record 65 winners. Later that year, he won the Bill Shoemaker Award for top Breeders' Cup performance by a jockey, winning the Breeders' Cup Distaff with Ashado and the Breeders' Cup Sprint with Speightstown. He won the Shoemaker Award again in 2011 and 2014. Velazquez finished 2004 with 335 wins from 1,327 races, a "remarkable" win rate of 25%. He was the 2004 leading jockey by earnings in North America and won the 2004 Eclipse Award for Outstanding Jockey.

In 2005, Velazquez broke the national earnings record set in 2003 by Jerry Bailey. He went on to a second leading jockey title and second Eclipse Award. He won 65 stakes races with 34 horses, including champions Ashado and Leroidesanimaux. He won at 15 tracks in the U.S., Canada, and Dubai.

On April 20, 2006, Velazquez was seriously injured in a fall at Keeneland racetrack, suffering a fractured shoulder blade, two broken ribs, a bruised sternum, and a slightly injured right lung. He was originally expected to miss five months but was able to return for the Belmont Stakes in June, in which he finished second. Later that year, he was elected to the Puerto Rico Horse Racing Hall of Fame.

Going into the 2007 Belmont Stakes, Velazquez was 0 for 21 in American Triple Crown races. He picked up the mount on Rags to Riches at the last moment and rode her for the first time in the Belmont. Rags to Riches stumbled at the start, then was taken wide by another horse around the first turn before Velazquez guided her to better position. In a prolonged stretch duel with Curlin, he hit the filly twice for a little encouragement. They withstood several bumps from the colt and prevailed by a head. It was the first win for a filly in the Belmont since 1905. It was also the first Classic victory for trainer Todd Pletcher, Velazquez's most important client. "There were drinks flying everywhere," said Lauren Robson, the exercise rider of Rags to Riches. "Leona (Velazquez) was in tears right away and she put me in tears. It was so great because Todd and Johnny have been together for so long."

In 2009, Velazquez, nicknamed "Johnny V", was awarded the Santa Anita George Woolf Memorial Jockey Award by his fellow jockeys in recognition of his career and personal character. At that time, he had already earned 24 racing titles at Aqueduct, Belmont Park, and Saratoga. That year, he rode Quality Road to a win at the Florida Derby, knocking off the previously unbeaten Dunkirk. He later rode Dunkirk to a second-place finish in the Belmont Stakes.

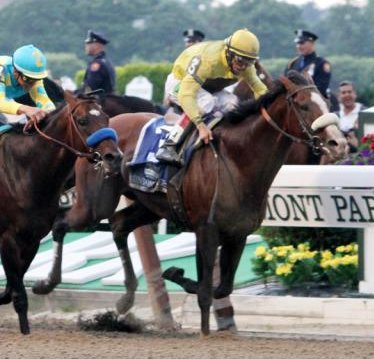
Winning the Belmont on Union Rags

On May 7, 2011, Velazquez won his first Kentucky Derby, riding Animal Kingdom. He was supposed to ride Uncle Mo, but his horse was scratched from the race due to stomach problems. Then, due to an injury to Robby Albarado, Animal Kingdom's regular rider, Velazquez got the mount and won the race. He rode Animal Kingdom again in the 136th Preakness Stakes and almost repeated the Kentucky Derby feat, coming from behind. However, Animal Kingdom finished second to Shackleford. Velázquez said about the loss, "It's a tough one. It's a real tough one ... I thought this horse had a really good chance to make it. Things didn't go our way today. He ran great, but he didn't quite get there."

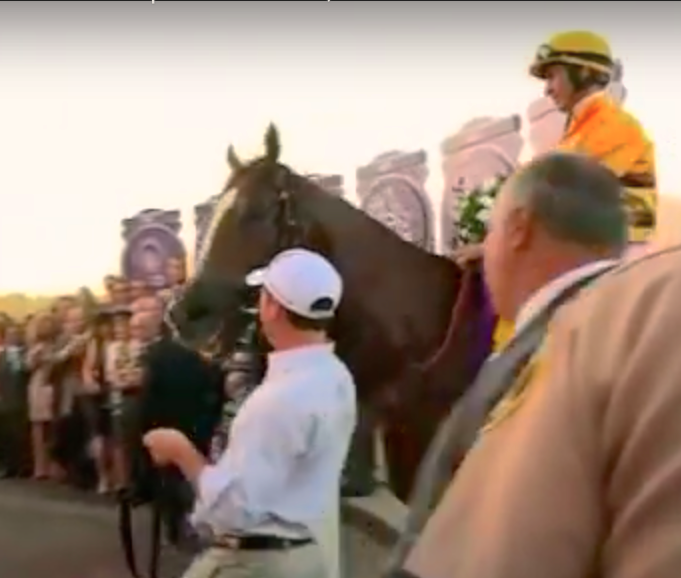
Velazquez and Wise Dan in the winners' circle after the 2012 Breeders' Cup Mile

In the 2012 Belmont Stakes, Velazquez won his third Triple Crown Race aboard Union Rags. Later in the year, he won the Breeders' Cup Mile on the gelding Wise Dan, who became a two-time American Horse of the Year in 2012 and 2013 with Velazquez as his regular rider. Also in 2012, Velazquez was inducted into the National Museum of Racing and Hall of Fame. He was introduced by Pletcher, whom Velazquez thanked, saying: "Todd's been my number one supporter for many, many years ... The marriage is still going, right, Todd? Almost as long as my marriage with Leona."

Velazquez reached several milestones in 2013. On June 14, he won his 5,000th race at Belmont Park aboard Galloping Giraffe. He became Saratoga's all-time winningest rider on July 27, with his 694th victory at that track aboard Unitarian. On October 13, he became the all-time leading money winner among North American jockeys, surpassing Pat Day in the ninth race at Belmont aboard the filly Bit Bustin. After that race, his earnings reached $297,922,320 in career purses. His year ended abruptly during the Breeders' Cup weekend at Santa Anita on November 2 when his mount in the Juvenile Fillies fractured her leg and fell, throwing Velazquez, who was struck by one of the trailing horses. He was taken to hospital and had his spleen removed.

Velazquez returned to the track in late January 2014 at Gulfstream Park in Florida. Later that year, he became the all-time leading money winner in the history of jockeying and the first whose earnings surpassed $300 million.

Velazquez won the 2017 Kentucky Derby riding Always Dreaming. At the 2017 Breeders' Cup, he won both the Distaff with Forever Unbridled and the Mile with World Approval. This brought his lifetime total to fifteen, tying him for the second-most wins in Breeders' Cup history with Jerry Bailey, behind only Mike Smith.

On November 30, 2018, Velazquez earned win number 6000 aboard Singapore Trader, trained by Todd Pletcher.

On May 18, 2019, in the Preakness Stakes he was thrown off at the start of the race by Bodexpress, with the horse running riderless for the duration of the race.

On September 5, 2020, Velazquez won his third Kentucky Derby after riding Authentic to victory. On May 1, 2021, he rode Medina Spirit, trained by two-time Triple Crown winner Bob Baffert, to victory in the 147th Kentucky Derby at Churchill Downs. However, Medina Spirit tested positive for betamethasone after the race and was disqualified by the Kentucky Horse Racing Commission on February 21, 2022.

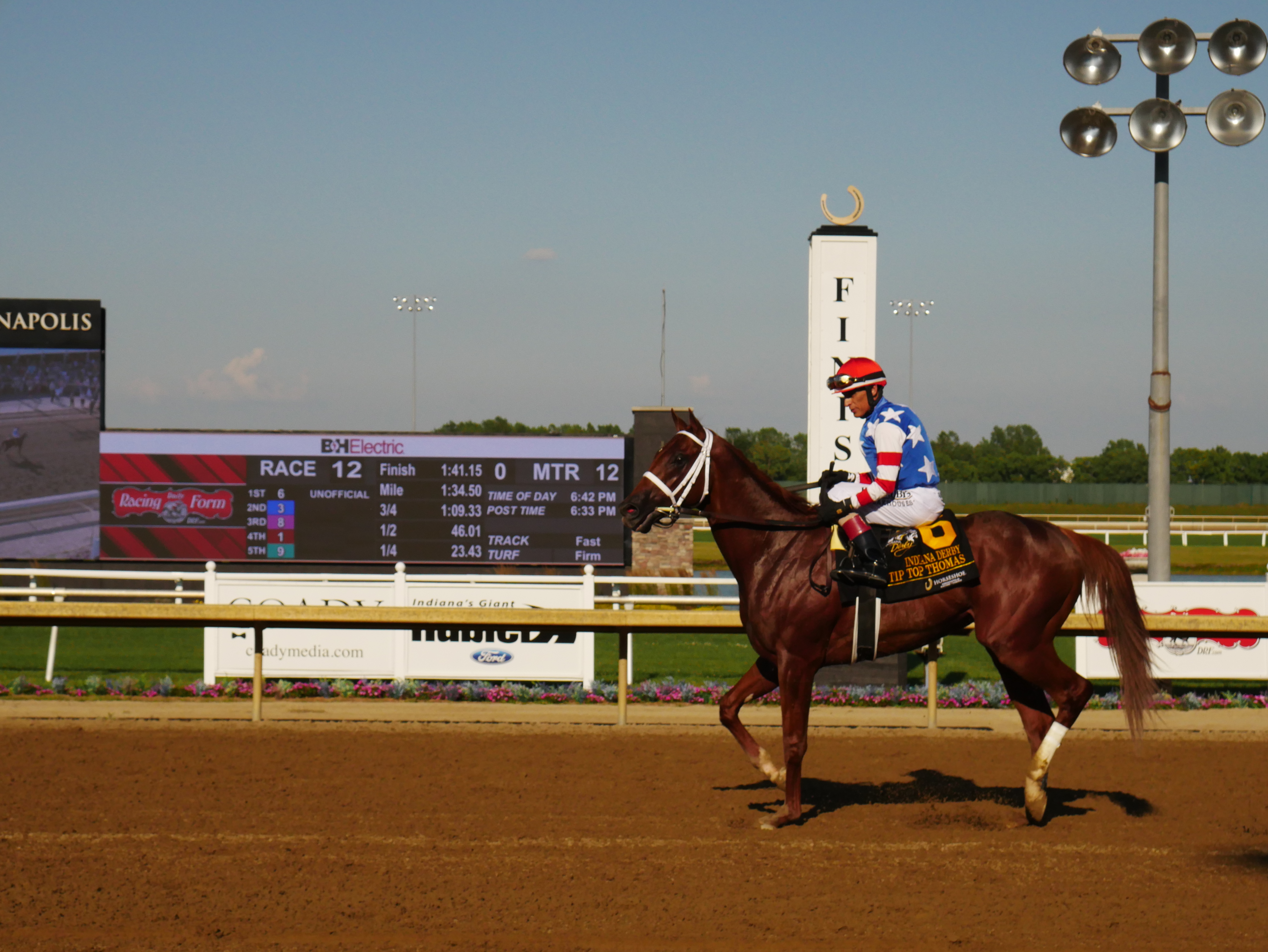
Tip Top Thomas and Velazquez at the 2025 Indiana Derby

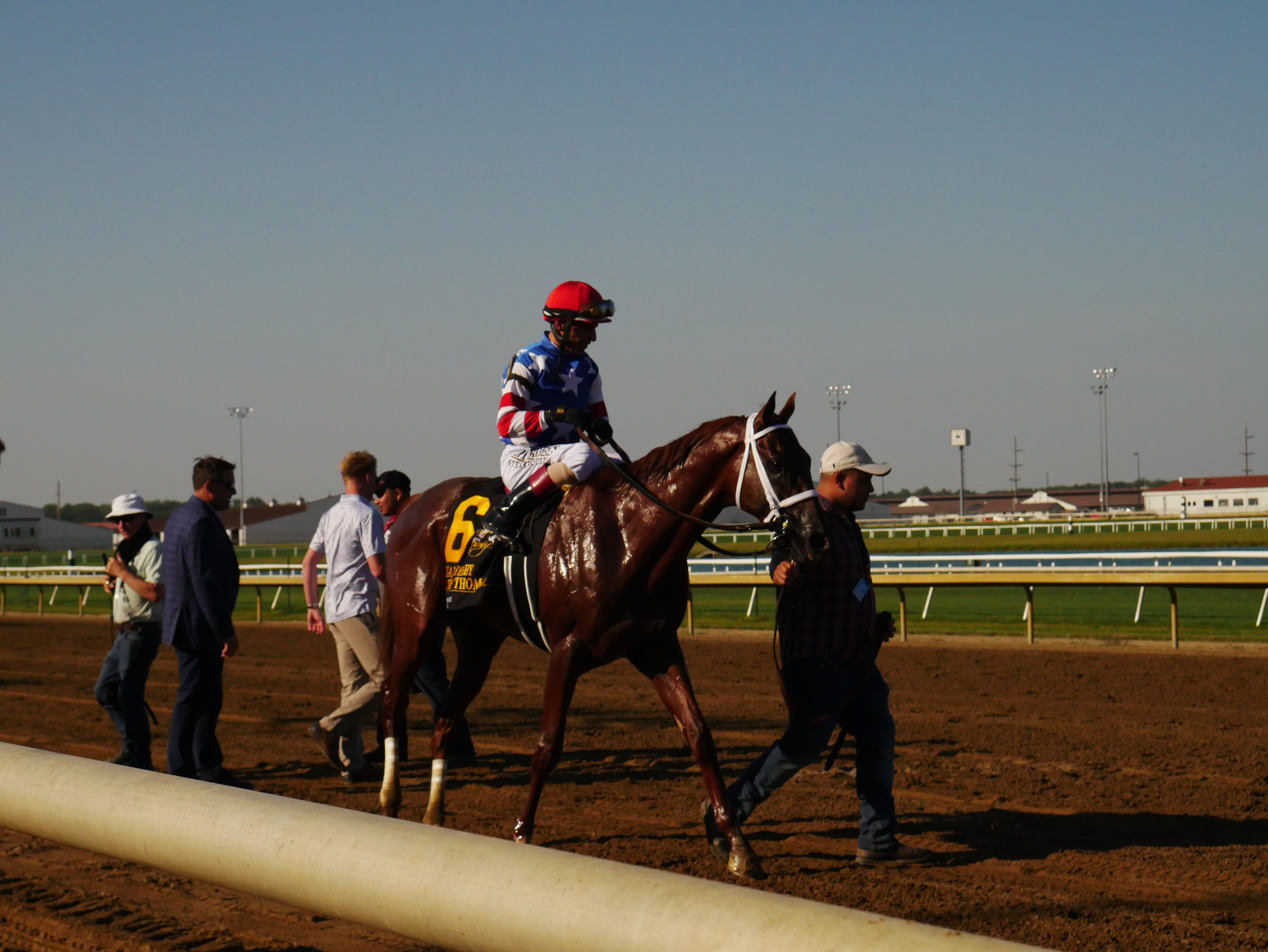
Tip Top Thomas and Velazquez at the 2025 Indiana Derby

On July 5, 2025, Velazquez won the 2025 Indiana Derby riding Tip Top Thomas.

=== Year-end charts ===
Chart (2000–present)	Rank by earnings
National Earnings List for Jockeys 2000	10
National Earnings List for Jockeys 2001	2
National Earnings List for Jockeys 2002	3
National Earnings List for Jockeys 2003	3
National Earnings List for Jockeys 2004	1
National Earnings List for Jockeys 2005	1
National Earnings List for Jockeys 2006	4
National Earnings List for Jockeys 2007	3
National Earnings List for Jockeys 2008	7
National Earnings List for Jockeys 2009	6
National Earnings List for Jockeys 2010	3
National Earnings List for Jockeys 2011	2
National Earnings List for Jockeys 2012	3
National Earnings List for Jockeys 2013	3
National Earnings List for Jockeys 2014	4
National Earnings List for Jockeys 2015	3
National Earnings List for Jockeys 2016	4
National Earnings List for Jockeys 2017	4
National Earnings List for Jockeys 2018	6
National Earnings List for Jockeys 2019	6
National Earnings List for Jockeys 2020	5
National Earnings List for Jockeys 2021	8
