= 2017 Kentucky Derby =

Horse race

143rd Kentucky Derby
- Kentucky Derby
- The 143rd "Run for the Roses"
- Location: Churchill Downs; Louisville, Kentucky, United States
- Date: May 6, 2017
- Winning horse: Always Dreaming
- Winning time: 2:03.59
- Jockey: John Velazquez
- Trainer: Todd Pletcher
- Owner: MeB Racing Stables, Brooklyn Boyz, Teresa Viola Racing Stable, St. Elias Stable, Siena Farm & West Point Thoroughbreds
- Conditions: Wet Fast (sealed)
- Surface: Dirt
- Attendance: 158,070

The 2017 Kentucky Derby (branded as the 143rd Running of the Kentucky Derby presented by Yum! Brands for sponsorship reasons) was the 143rd running of the Kentucky Derby, and took place on Saturday, May 6, 2017. The Kentucky Derby is a horse race held each year in Louisville, Kentucky, on the first Saturday in May, at the end of the two-week-long Kentucky Derby Festival. It is a Grade I stakes race for three-year-old Thoroughbreds at a distance of 1 1/4 miles (2.0 km), and has been run at Churchill Downs racetrack since its inception in 1875.

The race was broadcast by NBC with a scheduled post time of 6:34 PM ET. The race went off at 6:52 PM ET before a crowd of 158,070 and a television audience of 16.5 million viewers, the race's largest since 1989. The winner was the post-time favorite, Always Dreaming.

== Qualification ==
The field for the Kentucky Derby was limited to twenty horses who qualified based on points earned in the Road to the Kentucky Derby, a series of races that was first introduced in 2013. Girvin was the top point-earner in 2017 after winning both the Risen Star Stakes and the Louisiana Derby. Classic Empire, who was the early Derby favorite after winning the Breeders' Cup Juvenile in 2016, finished second in the qualifying series after overcoming several setbacks to win the Arkansas Derby. The other major prep race winners were Gormley (Santa Anita Derby), Irap (Blue Grass Stakes), Irish War Cry (Wood Memorial), Always Dreaming (Florida Derby) and Thunder Snow (UAE Derby). Several other contenders did not enter due to injuries or because they raced inconsistently. For example, Not This Time was an early favorite for the Derby but was injured shortly after finishing second in the Breeders' Cup Juvenile and was retired from racing. After an impressive win in the San Felipe Stakes, Mastery was pulled up by his jockey and was found to have a condylar fracture requiring several months to heal.

For the first time, a spot in the starting gate was set aside for a horse from Japan through the separate Japan Road to the Kentucky Derby. Epicharis, a grandson of 1989 Kentucky Derby winner Sunday Silence, qualified by winning the Hyacinth Stakes at Tokyo Racecourse on February 19. However, the connections of Epicharis declined the invitation.

== Field ==
On May 3, entries for the Derby were taken and the post position draw was streamed live by Churchill Downs. After drawing post position 14, Classic Empire was installed as the lukewarm favorite on the morning line at 4–1 by Mike Battaglia. Always Dreaming in post position 5 and McCraken in post position 15 were both given odds of 5–1.

The entry fee is normally $25,000, but Fast and Accurate was required to pay a supplemental entry fee of $200,000 as he was not nominated to the Triple Crown earlier in the year. The two "also eligible" entries were scratched when none of the qualified horses opted to withdraw before the 9 a.m. Friday deadline.

== Race description ==
When betting opened, the odds for morning line favorite Classic Empire drifted up to 6.80/1 while those for Always Dreaming drifted down to 4.70/1, making Always Dreaming the post time favorite. The track was labelled as "Wet Fast (sealed)" with some standing water due to persistent rain over the course of several days. In spite of the weather, 158,070 people attended the Derby, the seventh-highest turnout in the history of the race. The television broadcast drew 16.5 million viewers, the most since 18.5 million watched Sunday Silence win the 1989 Derby.

The Kentucky Derby was won by Always Dreaming.

The race had a difficult start for several horses. The most striking aspect of the start was the shocking refusal of Thunder Snow to run. When the gates flew open Thunder Snow inexplicably begin to buck and writhe, refusing to proceed and immediately getting pulled up. The start for several other horses was disastrous due to a "chain reaction" caused by Irish War Cry who, in the 17th position, ducked to the inside at the start, pushing over number 16 Tapwrit, and as a result, the 15 horse, McCracken, bumped heavily with number 14, Classic Empire. "Classic Empire really got clobbered", said his trainer Mark Casse. "The track is impossible. Our horse ran extremely well, considering."

From post position five, Always Dreaming avoided traffic problems with a burst of early speed, then settled into second place behind long shot State of Honor. In the first turn, jockey John R. Velazquez kept the colt along the rail then moved him to the outside of State of Honor down the backstretch. The two raced together into the far turn, where State of Honor started to fade while Battle of Midway and Irish War Cry moved up to challenge for the lead. Always Dreaming quickly responded by drawing away, opening up a lead of several lengths. Lookin At Lee, who had run along the rail for most of the race, found racing room and made a late run, but never threatened Always Dreaming, who won by 2 3/4 lengths. Battle of Midway was five lengths behind in third with Classic Empire finishing fourth.

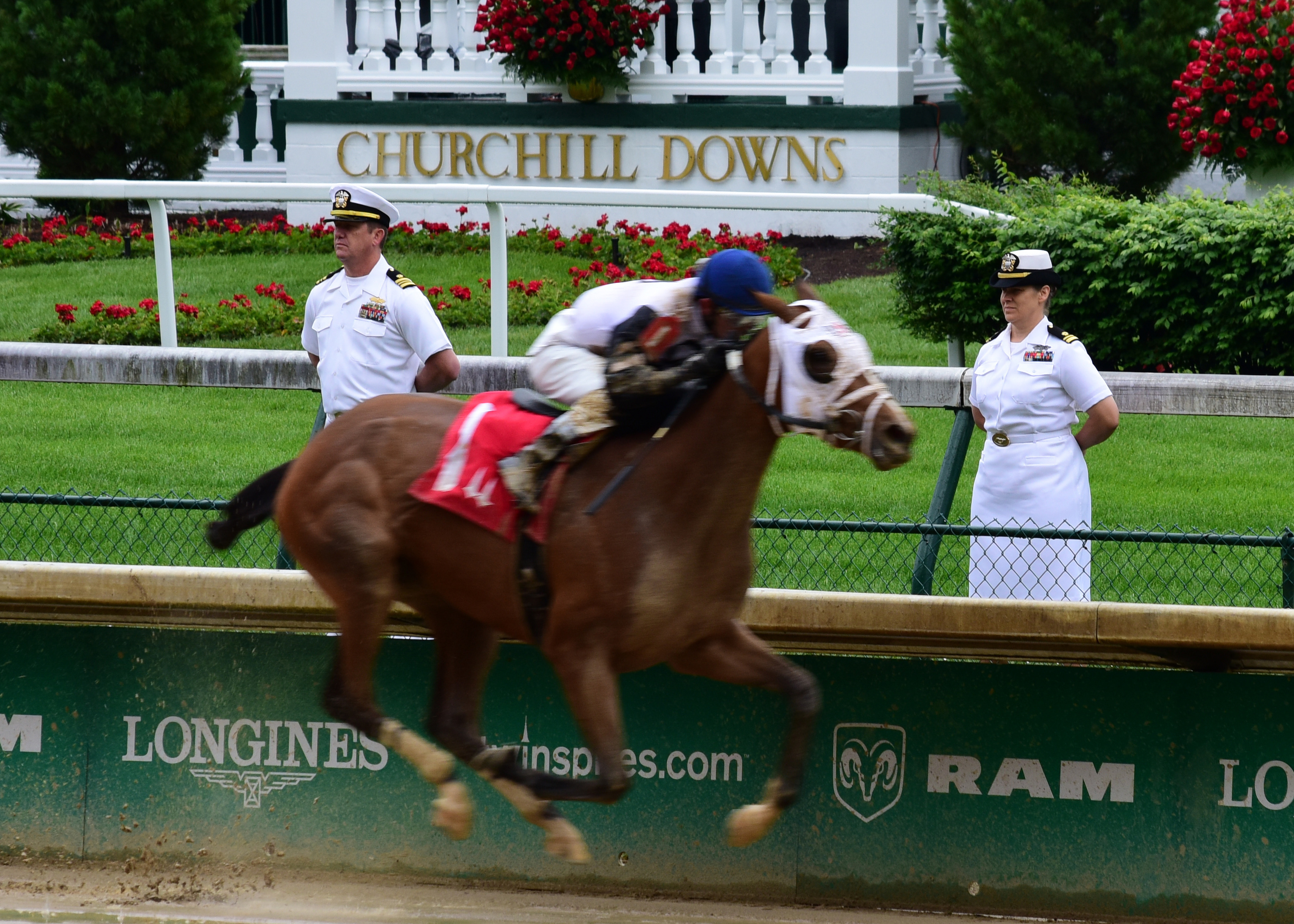
Second-place finisher Lookin At Lee nearing the finish.

Trainer Todd Pletcher had entered the race with one win (Super Saver in 2010) from forty-five starters over the years. Although one of the most successful trainers in the history of the sport, Pletcher was relieved to get another Derby win with Always Dreaming. "To me", Pletcher said, "I felt I really needed that second one, you know?"

It was also the second Derby win for Velazquez, who had previously won in 2011 with Animal Kingdom. "This is the best horse Todd and I have ever come to the Kentucky Derby with", he said. "I got a good position early and then he relaxed. When we hit the quarter pole, I asked him and he responded. He did it himself from there."

It was the first Derby win for the ownership group that included Anthony Bonomo (who owns Brooklyn Boyz Stable), his wife Mary Ellen (MeB Racing), Vincent Viola (St Elias Stable) and his wife Teresa (Teresa Viola Racing). Mary Ellen Bonomo named the horse because of her tendency to daydream. "Everybody dreams of something, whether it's a big event or special day, the birth of their child, winning the Kentucky Derby. So I just said, 'Always Dreaming.' It just took off."

This was the fifth consecutive Derby in which the post-time favorite won. The only other time this happened was in the late 1890s.

== Result ==
Finish	Post	Horse	Jockey	Trainer	Morning Line Odds	Final Odds	Margin (lengths)	Winnings	Points
1	5	Always Dreaming	John Velazquez	Todd Pletcher	5–1	4.70	+2 3/4	$1,635,800	100
2	1	Lookin At Lee	Corey Lanerie	Steve Asmussen	20–1	33.20	2 3/4	$400,000	32
3	11	Battle of Midway	Flavien Prat	Jerry Hollendorfer	30–1	40.00	7 3/4	$200,000	40
4	14	Classic Empire	Julien Leparoux	Mark Casse	4–1	6.80	8 3/4	$100,000	132
5	19	Practical Joke	Joel Rosario	Chad Brown	20–1	27.80	9 1/2	$60,000	74
6	16	Tapwrit	José Ortiz	Todd Pletcher	20–1	27.10	10 1/4		54
7	10	Gunnevera	Javier Castellano	Antonio Sano	15–1	10.00	13 1/4		84
8	15	McCraken	Brian Hernandez Jr.	Ian Wilkes	5–1	6.90	13 1/4		40
9	18	Gormley	Victor Espinoza	John Shirreffs	15–1	22.30	14 1/4		125
10	17	Irish War Cry	Rajiv Maragh	H. Graham Motion	6–1	4.80	16 1/2		110
11	8	Hence	Florent Geroux	Steve Asmussen	15–1	15.00	18 1/2		50
12	4	Untrapped	Ricardo Santana Jr.	Steve Asmussen	30–1	58.00	19 1/4		34
13	7	Girvin	Mike E. Smith	Joe Sharp	15–1	22.10	19 1/2		150
14	20	Patch	Tyler Gaffalione	Todd Pletcher	30–1	14.10	21		40
15	13	J Boys Echo	Luis Saez	Dale Romans	20–1	47.30	23		63
16	12	Sonneteer	Kent Desormeaux	J. Keith Desormeaux	50–1	39.70	26 1/4		30
17	3	Fast and Accurate	Channing Hill	Michael Maker	50–1	41.80	28 3/4		50
18	9	Irap	Mario Gutierrez	Doug O'Neill	20–1	41.40	40 3/4		113
19	6	State of Honor	Jose Lezcano	Mark Casse	30–1	54.00	45 3/4		62
DNF	2	Thunder Snow	Christophe Soumillon	Saeed bin Suroor	20–1	16.40			100
—N/a	also eligible	~~Royal Mo~~	~~Gary Stevens~~	~~John Shirreffs~~	SCR				30
—N/a	also eligible	~~Master Plan~~	~~John Velazquez~~	~~Todd Pletcher~~	SCR				30

- Track: Wet Fast (sealed)

Times: 1/4 mile – 0:22.70; 1/2 mile – 0:46.53; 3/4 mile – 1:11.12; mile – 1:37.27; final – 2:03.59.
Splits for each quarter-mile: (:22.70) (:23.83) (:24.59) (:26.15) (:26.32)

Source: Equibase chart

== Payout ==
The Kentucky Derby payout schedule

Program number	Horse Name	Win	Place	Show
5	Always Dreaming	$11.40	$7.20	$5.80
1	Lookin At Lee	—	$26.60	$15.20
11	Battle of Midway	—	—	$20.80

- $2 Exacta: (5–1) $336.20
- $1 Trifecta: (5–1–11) $8,297.20
- $1 Superfecta: (5–1–11–14) $75,974.50
- $1 Super Hi 5 (Pentafecta): (5–1–11–14–19) $493,348.70

== Subsequent Grade I wins ==
After winning the Derby, Always Dreaming never won another race. Several of the runners up went on to achieve Grade I success:

- Battle of Midway – Breeders' Cup Dirt Mile
- Practical Joke – H. Allen Jerkens Stakes
- Tapwrit – Belmont Stakes
- Girvin – Haskell Invitational
- Thunder Snow – Prix Jean Prat, 2018 & 2019 Dubai World Cup
