= Breeders' Cup Dirt Mile top three finishers =

This is a listing of the horses that finished in either first, second, or third place and the number of starters in the Breeders' Cup Dirt Mile, a grade one race run on dirt held on Saturday of the Breeders' Cup World Thoroughbred Championships.

Year	Winner	Second	Third	Starters
2026	Further Ado	Owen Almighty	Full Serrano (ARG)	10
2025	Nysos	Citizen Bull	Chancer McPatrick	8
2024	Full Serrano (ARG)	Post Time	Domestic Product	13
2023	Cody's Wish	National Treasure	Skippylongstocking	7
2022	Cody's Wish	Cyberknife	Slow Down Andy	9
2020	Knicks Go	Jesus' Team	Sharp Samurai	12
2019	Spun to Run	Omaha Beach	Blue Chipper	10
2018	City of Light	Seeking the Soul	Bravazo	9
2017	Battle of Midway	Sharp Azteca	Awesome Slew	10
2016	Tamarkuz	Gun Runner	Accelerate	9
2015	Liam's Map	Lea	Red Vine	11
2014	Goldencents	Tapiture	Pants On Fire	9
2013	Goldencents	Golden Ticket	Brujo De Olleros	11
2012	Tapizar	Rail Trip	Delegation	9
2011	Caleb's Posse	Shackleford	Tres Borrachos	9
2010	Dakota Phone	Morning Line	Gayego	12
2009	Furthest Land	Ready's Echo	Midshipman	10
2008	Albertus Maximus	Rebellion	Two Step Salsa	12
2007	Corinthian	Gottcha Gold	Discreet Cat	8
