= 2023 Breeders' Cup =

Thoroughbred horse racing event

- 2023 Breeders' Cup logo
- Class: Championship Event Series
- Location: Santa Anita Park, Arcadia, California
- Race type: Thoroughbred
- Website: www.breederscup.com

Race information
- Distance: See individual races
- Surface: Turf, Dirt
- Purse: Varies by Race; from $1 million to $6 million

The 2023 Breeders' Cup World Championships was the 40th edition of the premier event of the North American Thoroughbred horse racing year. The 14 races, all of which were Grade I, took place on November 3 and 4 at Santa Anita Park in Arcadia, California. In the United States, the two-day championship event was shown live across NBC, Peacock, USA Network, and FanDuel TV on Friday and Saturday, and on ITV in the UK.

The Breeders' Cup is generally regarded as the end of the North American racing season, although a few Grade I events take place in later November and December. The event typically determines champions in many of the Eclipse Award divisions.

== Races ==
=== Friday, November 3 ===
Race name	Post time (PDT)	Sponsor	Distance	Restrictions	Purse	Winner (Bred)	Odds	Margin
Juvenile Turf Sprint	2:00pm		5 furlongs	2-year-olds	$1 million	Big Evs (IRE)	3.20	1/2 length
Juvenile Fillies	2:40pm	NetJets	1 1/16 miles	2-year-old fillies	$2 million	Just F Y I	7.00	neck
Juvenile Fillies Turf	3:20pm		1 mile	2-year-old fillies	$1 million	Hard to Justify	9.10	1/2 length
Juvenile	4:00pm	FanDuel	1 1/16 miles	2-year-old colts and geldings	$2 million	Fierceness	16.50	6 1/4 lengths
Juvenile Turf	4:40pm	Prevagen	1 mile	2-year-old colts and geldings	$1 million	Unquestionable (FR)	1.50*	1 1/2 lengths

An asterisk after the odds means the winner was the post-time favorite

Source: Equibase charts for Friday, November 3

Legend:
Dirt Turf

=== Saturday, November 4 ===
Due to NBC broadcast college football event, this year marks the first time that Breeders' Cup races were held after the Breeders' Cup Classic. The race 12 finale had a post time of 5:00 p.m. PDT.

Race name	Post time (PDT)	Sponsor	Distance	Restrictions	Purse	Winner (Bred)	Odds	Margin
Dirt Mile	11:30am	Big Ass Fans	1 mile	3 yrs+	$2 million	Cody's Wish	0.80*	nose
Filly & Mare Turf	12:10pm	Maker's Mark	1 1/4 miles	3 yrs+ fillies & mares	$2 million	Inspiral (GB)	2.50*	neck
Filly & Mare Sprint	12:50pm	PNC Bank	7 furlongs	3 yrs+ fillies & mares	$1 million	Goodnight Olive	1.10*	2 3/4 lengths
Mile	1:30pm	FanDuel	1 mile	3 yrs+	$2 million	Master of The Seas (IRE)	3.30	nose
Distaff	2:10pm	Longines	1 1/8 miles	3 yrs+ fillies & mares	$2 million	Idiomatic	1.80*	1/2 length
Turf	2:50pm	Longines	1 1/2 miles	3 yrs+	$4 million	Auguste Rodin (IRE)	2.50*	3/4 length
Classic	3:40pm	Longines	1 1/4 miles	3 yrs+	$6 million	White Abarrio	2.60*	1 length
Turf Sprint	4:25pm		5 furlongs	3 yrs+	$1 million	Nobals	12.00	neck
Sprint	5:00pm	Qatar Racing	6 furlongs	3 yrs+	$2 million	Elite Power	1.70*	1 1/2 lengths

An asterisk after the odds means the winner was the post-time favorite

Source: Equibase charts for Saturday, November 4

Legend:
Dirt Turf
