= Kay Army =

Chilean thoroughbred racehorse

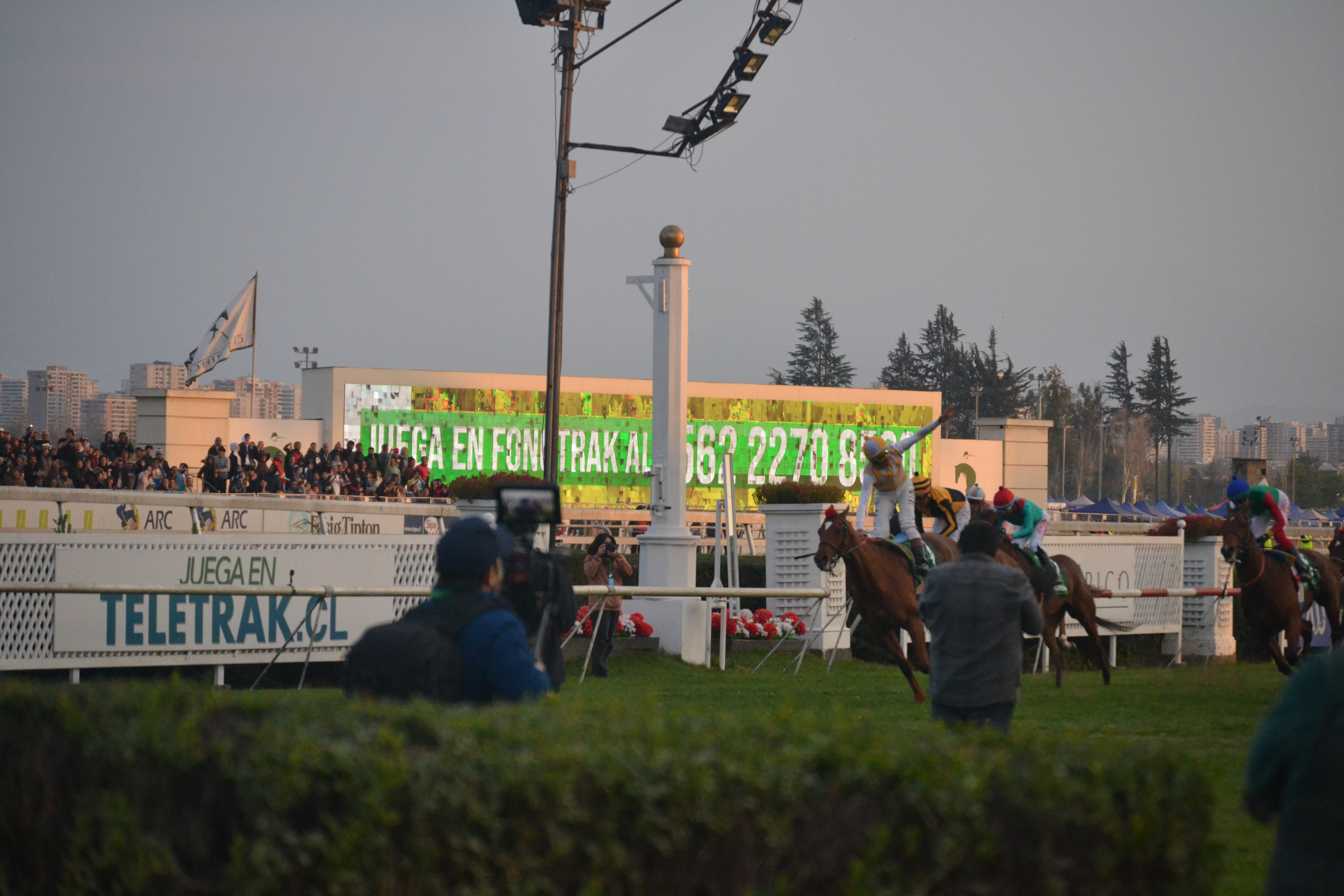
- Kay Army winning the 2023 El Ensayo
- Sire: Katmai
- Grandsire: Scat Daddy
- Dam: Soviet Army
- Damsire: Pure Prize
- Sex: Stallion
- Foaled: August 27, 2020
- Died: August 20, 2025 (aged 4)
- Country: Chile
- Colour: Chestnut
- Breeder: Haras Taomina (Agrícola Taomina Ltd.)
- Owner: Stud Identic (Ignacio Hurtado and Ignacio Hurtado Jr.)
- Record: 12: 10-0-1
- Earnings: $445,708

Major wins
- Clásico Cotejo de Potrillos (2023) Clásico Álvaro Covarrubias P. (2023); Clásico Criadores Machos Marcel Zarour A. (2023); Clásico Alberto Vial Infante (2023); Clásico Polla de Potrillos (2023); Clásico Nacioanl Ricardo Lyon (2023); Clásico El Ensayo (2023); Clásico St. Leger (2023) El Derby (2023)

Kay Army (27 August 2020–20 August 2025) was a champion Chilean Thoroughbred racehorse who won the Chilean Triple Crown while undefeated, winning ten races in a row in Chile, including six consecutive Group One races. He raced briefly in the United States before dying from pneumonia.

== Background ==
Kay Army was a well-balanced chestnut stallion with a large star, bred by Haras Taomina.

In Chile, Kay Army was trained by Patricio Baeza. In the United States, he was trained by Bill Mott.

== Racing career ==
=== Chilean campaign ===
Kay Army debuted at the Club Hípico de Santiago at the age of two. He won two Group Three racess (Clásico Cotejo de Potrillos, Clásico Álvaro Covarrubias P.), a Group Two race (Clásico Criadores Machos Marcel Zarour A.), and a Group One race (Clásico Alberto Vial Infante) as a two-year-old.

At age three, Kay Army won the Group One Polla de Potrillos and Group One Clásico Nacional Ricardo Lyon before contesting the Group One Clásico El Ensayo, the first leg of the Chilean Triple Crown. After winning El Ensayo, Kay Army raced outside Club Hípico de Santiago for the first time in winning the Group One Clásico St. Leger at Hipódromo Chile and Group One El Derby at Valparaíso Sporting Club, winning the national Chilean Triple Crown.

Kay Army was dominant in all his starts in Chile.

=== American campaign ===
During early training in the United States, Kay Army was injured and took several months off for recovery. He finished third in the Grade 2 Fort Marcy Stakes in his first American start. In his next start, the Cape Henlopen Stakes, Kay Army was pulled up at the three-sixteenth pole and was walked off.

== Race record ==
Date	Age	Distance	Surface	Race	Grade	Track	Odds	Field	Finish	Time	Winning (losing) magrin	Jockey	Ref
Mar 17, 2023	2	1300 meters	Turf	Condicional	Maiden	Club Hípico de Santiago	3.1*	16	1	1:14.98	6 1/4 lengths	Jaime Medina	
Apr 6, 2023	2	1300 meters	Turf	Clásico Cotejo de Potrillos	III	Club Hípico de Santiago	1.4*	7	1	1:14.24	2 3/4 lengths	Jaime Medina	
Apr 30, 2023	2	1600 meters	Turf	Clásico Alvaro Covarrubias P.	III	Club Hípico de Santiago	1.3*	6	1	1:35.61	8 lengths	Oscar Ulloa	
June 2, 2023	2	1600 meters	Turf	Clásico Criadores Machos Marcel Zarour A.	II	Club Hípico de Santiago	1.2*	8	1	1:32.46	4 1/4 lengths	Oscar Ulloa	
June 25, 2023	2	1600 meters	Turf	Clásico Alberto Vial Infante	I	Club Hípico de Santiago	1.2*	9	1	1:37.23	7 lengths	Oscar Ulloa	
Aug 6, 2023	3	1700 meters	Turf	Clásico Polla de Potrillos	I	Club Hípico de Santiago	1.1*	9	1	1:40.18	5 1/4 lengths	Oscar Ulloa	
Oct 1, 2023	3	2000 meters	Turf	Clásico Nacional Ricardo Lyon	I	Club Hípico de Santiago	1.2*	8	1	1:59.29	3 1/2 lengths	Oscar Ulloa	
Oct 27, 2023	3	2400 meters	Turf	Clásico El Ensayo	I	Club Hípico de Santiago	1.2*	8	1	2:29.46	1 1/2 lengths	Oscar Ulloa	
Dec 2, 2023	3	2200 meters	Dirt	Clásico St. Leger	I	Hipodromo Chile	2.00*	16	1	2:15.41	6 lengths	Oscar Ulloa	
Mar 17, 2024	3	2400 meters	Turf	Clásico El Derby	I	Valparaiso Sporting Club	1.4*	11	1	2:25.10	6 1/4 lengths	Oscar Ulloa	
May 3, 2025	4	9 furlongs	Turf	Fort Marcy Stakes	II	Belmont at the Big A	2.20	5	3	1:45.70	(7 3/4 lengths)	Jose Lezacno	
June 14, 2025	4	12 furlongs	Turf	Cape Henlopen Stakes	Listed	Delaware Park	2.50	10	DNF	2:27.61	Na	Junior Alvarado	

An asterisk after the odds means Kay Army was the post time favorite.

== Death ==
After failing to finish his last race, Kay Army was rested. Towards the end of the summer of 2025, he resumed mostly normal training, recording a workout on August 5th. Later that month, he developed a case of pneumonia. He received intensive care at Rood & Riddle Equine Hospital for a week, but died the morning of August 20, 2025.

== Pedigree ==
Pedigree of Kay Army (CHI), chestnut stallion, foaled August 27, 2020
Sire Katmai (CHI) 2011	Scat Daddy (USA); 2004	Johannesburg (USA)	Hennessy (USA)
Sire Katmai (CHI) 2011	Scat Daddy (USA); 2004	Johannesburg (USA)	Myth (USA)
Sire Katmai (CHI) 2011	Scat Daddy (USA); 2004	Love Style (USA)	Mr. Prospector (USA)
Sire Katmai (CHI) 2011	Scat Daddy (USA); 2004	Love Style (USA)	Likeable Style (USA)
Sire Katmai (CHI) 2011	Kossanova (USA); 1997	Fly So Free (USA)	Time For A Change (USA)
Sire Katmai (CHI) 2011	Kossanova (USA); 1997	Fly So Free (USA)	Free To Fly (USA)
Sire Katmai (CHI) 2011	Kossanova (USA); 1997	Kossakowna (USA)	Mr. Prospector (USA)
Sire Katmai (CHI) 2011	Kossanova (USA); 1997	Kossakowna (USA)	Lotka (USA)
Dam Soviet Army (ARG) 2011	Pure Prize (USA); 1998	Storm Cat (USA)	Storm Bird (CAN)
Dam Soviet Army (ARG) 2011	Pure Prize (USA); 1998	Storm Cat (USA)	Terlingua (USA)
Dam Soviet Army (ARG) 2011	Pure Prize (USA); 1998	Heavenly Prize (USA)	Seeking The Gold (USA)
Dam Soviet Army (ARG) 2011	Pure Prize (USA); 1998	Heavenly Prize (USA)	Oh What a Dance (USA)
Dam Soviet Army (ARG) 2011	Soviet Filly (ARG); 2005	Orpen (USA)	Lure (USA)
Dam Soviet Army (ARG) 2011	Soviet Filly (ARG); 2005	Orpen (USA)	Bonita Francita (CAN)
Dam Soviet Army (ARG) 2011	Soviet Filly (ARG); 2005	Slew Briosa (ARG)	Slewsville (USA)
Dam Soviet Army (ARG) 2011	Soviet Filly (ARG); 2005	Slew Briosa (ARG)	Evolución (ARG)

Kay Army is inbred 4S x 4S x 5D to Mr. Prospector, meaning Mr. Prospector appears twice in the fourth generation on the sire's side of the pedigree and once in the fifth generation on the dam's side of the pedigree. Kay Army is also inbred 3D x 5S to Storm Cat, 5S x 5D to Nijinsky, and 5S x 5D to Danzig.

== See also ==
- Triple Crown of Thoroughbred Racing
- List of leading Thoroughbred racehorses
