= Freire (horse) =

Chilean thoroughbred racehorse

- Sire: El Tango
- Grandsire: Olascoaga
- Dam: Filibus
- Damsire: Eclair
- Sex: Stallion
- Foaled: 1927
- Died: 1932
- Country: Chile
- Colour: Chestnut
- Breeder: Haras Los Cipreses (Héctor Anguita)
- Owner: Armando Valdés
- Trainer: Juan Cavieres Mella
- Record: 10: 10-0-0

Major wins
- Clásico El Ensayo (1930) Gran Premio Nacional (1930); Polla de Potrillos (1930); Clásico Comparación (1930); Clásico El Derby (1931); Clásico St. Leger (1931) Copa Juan S. Jackson (1931)

Freire (1927–1932) was an undefeated Chilean-bred Thoroughbred racehorse who won the Chilean Triple Crown. He also won the three classic races of Club Hípico de Santiago: the Clásico El Ensayo, the Polla de Potrillos, and the Gran Premio Nacional. He died shortly after retiring to stud without producing any surviving offspring.

== Background ==
Freire's sire El Tango was considered the greatest horse of his generation in Chile and the greatest horse produced by his sire, Olascoaga, winning six stakes races. El Tango led the Chilean sire list in 1930, with Freire as his principle earner.

Filibus, Freire's dam, ran once and failed to win. Her sire, Eclair, was a noted sire of classic winners, and her dam, Heráldica, is considered one of the founding mares of Chilean breeding. Freire was Filibus's second foal. Her first foal, the 1926 filly Filleule, also by El Tango, won the Cotejo de Potrancas and El Tanteo. Filibus would go on to produce Filibustero, considered one of the greatest racehorses in the history of the Chilean turf.

Freire was bred by Héctor Anguita at Haras Los Cipreses.

Freire was a chestnut with a front left sock and hind left stocking, and he was considered good looking, but with steep pasterns that negatively affected his soundness. He was trained throughout his career by Juan Cavieres Mella, who considered Freire the best he ever trained.

== Racing career ==
Freire debuted at age two on February 12, 1930, in the 800-meter Premio Campanzo at Club Hípico de Santiago, facing five others. The field was grouped together for the first half of the race, after which two horses started to pull ahead. Freire's jockey, Eduardo Rebolledo, asked Freire to move, and he accelerated suddenly, overtaking the leaders in two strides. He drew away to win by three lengths in a final time of :47 2/5.

Freire followed this with a two-and-half length win in a 1100-meter race on May 18. He next contested his first stakes race, the Clásico Comparación, also run over 1100 meters, only a week later. Freire won by one and a half lengths, defeating well-regarded racers such as Big Notice, Weimar, and Bodas de Oro.

Freire was then rested until August 3, when he ran in a 1500-meter handicap for his three-year-old debut. He won by six lengths, again defeated multiple good racehorses. In the Chilean Polla de Potrillos, run over 1400 meters on August 24, Freire took the lead at the head of the stretch and pulled away to win by eight lengths.

Leading up to the 2000-meter Gran Premio Nacional, rival jockeys planned to defeat Freire by boxing him in. Freire's jockey, Emilio Cáceres, on the instructions of trainer Juan Cavieres Mella, kept Freire in the clear in the middle of the track, to avoid being in contact with any of the other horses. Freire won by a length and a half.

Only five other horses came to face Freire in the 2400-meter Clásico El Ensayo, first leg of the Chilean Triple Crown, on a rainy October 19, 1930. Freire ran in second for much of the race behind the frontrunning Salar. When asked to extend by Cáceres, Freire quickly took the lead and won by five lengths in an easy gallop.

Freire was brought to Viña del Mar and the Valparaíso Sporting Club for the Clásico El Derby, second leg of the Chilean Triple Crown, which he won by two and a half lengths. Freire then ran in the Copa Juan S. Jackson on February 8, where only two others faced him. Cáceres let Freire run freely, and he won by 10 lengths in a time of 1:35 1/5 for the 1600 meters, breaking the previous record set by the noted racehorse Old Boy that had stood for 16 years by 2/5.

After the Copa Jackson, Freire's soundness was less than ideal, so Cavieres prepared him for the final leg of the Chilean Triple Crown, the 3000-meter Clásico St. Leger, with gentle trotting and long walks. Tantehue, second to Freire in El Derby, was the only other horse entered in the race. Tantehue was also in poor condition, and unable to work before the St. Leger. Freire's ability to put in a work prior to the race was also in doubt, so Cavieres had Freire trotted and then treated as if he had a full workout early in the morning to trick Tantehue's trainer into thinking that Freire had been able to work. The ruse succeeded, and Tantehue was withdrawn from the race, leaving Freire to walk over for the win and the Triple Crown.

== Retirement and stud career ==
Freire was retired to stand stud and covered a few mares, but all the foals were either aborted or died shortly after birth, leaving Freire with no offspring. He died in 1932.

== Pedigree ==
Pedigree of Freire (CHI), chestnut stallion, foaled 1927
Sire El Tango (CHI) 1911	Olascoaga (ARG); 1904	Orbit (IRE)	Bend Or (GB)
Sire El Tango (CHI) 1911	Olascoaga (ARG); 1904	Orbit (IRE)	Fair Alice (GB)
Sire El Tango (CHI) 1911	Olascoaga (ARG); 1904	Isolina (ARG)	Acheron (FR)
Sire El Tango (CHI) 1911	Olascoaga (ARG); 1904	Isolina (ARG)	Isology (GB)
Sire El Tango (CHI) 1911	Delice (ARG); 1897	St Mirin (GB)	Hermit (GB)
Sire El Tango (CHI) 1911	Delice (ARG); 1897	St Mirin (GB)	Lady Paramount (GB)
Sire El Tango (CHI) 1911	Delice (ARG); 1897	Darling (GB)	Bend Or (GB)
Sire El Tango (CHI) 1911	Delice (ARG); 1897	Darling (GB)	Periwig (GB)
Dam Filibus (CHI) 1915	Eclair (ARG); 1906	Orange (ARG)	Orbit (IRE)
Dam Filibus (CHI) 1915	Eclair (ARG); 1906	Orange (ARG)	Courbature (FR)
Dam Filibus (CHI) 1915	Eclair (ARG); 1906	La Fronde (ARG)	Neapolis (GB)
Dam Filibus (CHI) 1915	Eclair (ARG); 1906	La Fronde (ARG)	Loberia (ARG)
Dam Filibus (CHI) 1915	Heráldica (GB); 1908	Volodyovski (GB)	Florizel (GB)
Dam Filibus (CHI) 1915	Heráldica (GB); 1908	Volodyovski (GB)	La Reine (GB)
Dam Filibus (CHI) 1915	Heráldica (GB); 1908	Musetta (GB)	Bunbury (GB)
Dam Filibus (CHI) 1915	Heráldica (GB); 1908	Musetta (GB)	Tavira (GB)

Freire is inbred 3S × 4D to Orbit, meaning Orbit appears in the third generation on the sire's side of the pedigree and in the fourth generation on the dam's side of the pedigree. Freire is also inbred 4S x 4S x 5D to Bend Or and 5S x 5D to Isonomy.
