= Wolf (horse) =

Chilean Thoroughbred racehorse

- Sire: Domineau
- Grandsire: Never Bend
- Dam: Luna Fría
- Damsire: Rigel
- Sex: Stallion
- Foaled: August 19, 1987
- Died: 2002
- Country: Chile
- Colour: Dark Bay or Brown
- Breeder: Haras Santa Amelia
- Owner: Haras Santa Amelia; A. Allende W. S. Farish & Jamail Jr.
- Record: 15: 10-1-1
- Earnings: USD$428,297

Major wins
- Clásico Raimundo Valdés C. (1990) Clásico Alberto Vial Infante (1990); Clásico Nacional Ricardo Lyon (1990); Clásico El Ensayo (1990); Clásico St. Leger (1990); Gran Clásico Coronación (1990) Clásico El Derby(1991)

Awards
- Chilean Horse of the Year (1990, 1991) Chilean Champion Turf Two-Year-Old (1989/1990); Chilean Champion Turf Three-Year-Old (1990/1991); Chilean Champion Dirt Three-Year-Old (1990/1991) Chilean Triple Crown (1990/1991)

Wolf (19 August 1987–2002) was a champion Chilean Thoroughbred racehorse who won the Chilean Triple Crown while undefeated, compiling a win streak of ten races, including six consecutive Group 1 wins, and was named the Chilean Horse of the Year in 1990 and 1991. According to articles by El Turf and Textual, Wolf is considered to be one of the best Chilean racehorses ever. Along with Gran Ducato, he was voted the Chilean Horse of the Decade of 1990. Wolf became known as the 'turf champion' of his home track, Club Hípico de Santiago.

== Background ==
Wolf was a dark bay or brown horse with no markings, bred by Haras Santa Amelia.

Wolf's sire Domineau was bred in the United States, where he spent his racing career, winning only 3 of 51 starts and $97,615, never advancing beyond the allowance level. Exported to Chile, Domineau found more success as a sire, becoming the leading sire in Chile in 1988 and 1990.

Wolf was sold at auction and purchased by trainer Hernán Miranda for the "Stud Panamá", who found some physical issues with Wolf's feet and returned him to his breeder. Haras Santa Amelia campaigned Wolf, with José Tomás Allende Fernández as his trainer.

== Racing career ==
=== In Chile (1990-1991) ===
Wolf debuted as a two-year-old on April 29, 1990, in a 1300-meter maiden race at Club Hípico de Santiago, which he won by five and a half lengths. A month later, he easily won the Group 3 Clásico Raimundo Valdés C. over 1600 meters, with a winning margin of nine lengths.

Wolf's third race was the Group 1 Clásico Alberto Vial Infante, also 1600 meters long. Along with being his first start at the highest level of racing, it was his first start on a yielding track, since all of this other starts were run under firm conditions. He didn't handle the yielding track well, with his trainer José Tomás Allende Fernández saying that he dropped in level on the surface. Wolf struggled in the race, but managed to defeat Mayfair by one and a quarter lengths.

Wolf returned to the races as a three-year-old in the Group 1 Clásico Nacional Ricardo Lyon, run over 2000 meters. He ran in fifth place in the early parts of the race before moving to the lead 400 meters from the finish, pulling away to win by an authoritative eight and a quarter lengths.

A month later, Wolf ran in the Group 1 Clásico El Ensayo, one of the most important races on the Chilean calendar and the first leg of the Chilean Triple Crown. Ten rivals faced Wolf, including Mayfair, who took the early lead in the 2400-meter race. Wolf ran the same way he did in the Clásico Nacional Ricardo Lyon, waiting in fifth place before making his move around the final turn. Once again, Wolf pulled away easily, winning by seven and a quarter lengths and setting a new track record of 2:23.1.

The Group 1 Clásico St. Leger, second leg of the Triple Crown, was Wolf's next race, run on December 1, 1990. It was his first race at a different track, Hipódromo Chile, and his first race on the dirt. The favorite for the race was Memo, then considered the best horse in training at Hipódromo Chile. The confrontation between the two colts was built up as the 'race of the century', with nearly one hundred thousand people attending the race.

As per his usual, Memo took the lead right out of the gates, but Wolf's jockey Luis Muñoz Ibáñez rode him much closer to the pace than usual, in third place, to avoid giving Memo too much of an advantage early on. Wolf moved into second place a little over 900 meters from the finish, and Luis Muñoz Ibáñez pushed him to stay on Memo's heels, despite so much of the 2200 meter race still being left to run. Coming into the homestretch, Wolf drew up next to Memo, and the two dug in for the final 400 meters. The two drew away from the rest of the field, by over twenty lengths. The two remained neck-and-neck until the final 150 meters, when Wolf began to open up on Memo, eventually winning by a length and three quarters. Afterwards, Wolf's trainer José Tomás Allende Fernández said "This is the loveliest race I have ever seen in my life."

Wolf returned to Club Hípico de Santiago later that month to run in the Group 1 Gran Clásico Coronación, run over a distance of 2000 meters. He won the race by nine lengths in a "walk".

The third and final leg of the Chilean Triple Crown, the Group 1 Clásico El Derby, a 2400-meter long race at Valparaiso Sporting Club, was run February 3, 1991. Wolf was a strong favorite to become the first horse since Prólogo in 1966 to win the Triple Crown, despite the return presence of Memo. Wolf performed as expected, and the race unfolded much like the St. Leger, although this time Wolf crossed the finish line five lengths ahead of Memo.

For his campaign in 1990 and 1991, Wolf was named the Chilean Champion Turf Two-Year-Old, Champion Turf Three-Year-Old, Champion Dirt Three-Year-Old, and Horse of the Year.

=== In the United States (1991-1992) ===
A half share in Wolf was sold by Haras Santa Amelia to William Farish III, owner of Lane's End Farm, after which he was sent to the United States. Wolf's American campaign began July 29, 1991, in a mile long allowance race run over the Del Mar turf. Neil Drysdale had taken over training, and jockey Gary Stevens rode Wolf. Wolf was fractious and trailed the field for most of the race before rallying to finish second by two lengths. After this race, he began to run in the colors of Lane's End Farm instead of those of Haras Santa Amelia. On October 4, he ran in a mile and one-eighth allowance at Santa Anita and won by three-quarters of a length. Among the horses he defeated in this race was Golden Pheasant, winner of the Arlington Million and future winner of the Japan Cup.

Wolf then progressed to stakes races, running in the Grade 2 Citation Handicap, run over one and one-eighth miles on the turf at Hollywood Park, on November 30. Assigned 119 pounds, he was the co-highweight with Best Pal and two other entrants. Wolf ran third, just under two lengths from the winner. Wolf was then pointed towards the Grade 1 Hollywood Turf Cup, although some consideration was given towards running him in the Japan Cup. The day before the Hollywood Turf Cup, Wolf suffered a nearly-fatal colic and underwent emergency surgery that removed a meter and a half of intestine.

Due to his recovery, Wolf didn't race again until September 10, 1992, when he contested a mile and one-eighth allowance race on the turf at Woodbine. He won handily by a half length. On October 4, he ran in the Grade 2 Niagara Handicap, one and one-quarter miles on the turf, as the favorite and highweight, assigned 117 pounds. He ran at the back of the field before making up ground late, but only managed to finish fourth. Two weeks later, he ran in the Grade 1 Rothmans Ltd. International Stakes over one and one-half miles on the turf. He made a bid, but hung in the late stretch to finish fourth.

Twelve days later, Wolf ran again, this time in the listed Prized Handicap, run over one and three-eighths miles at Gulfstream Park. He was the favorite and 117-pound highweight, but only managed a mild rally in the stretch, finishing fifth of ten. In this race, Wolf suffered an injury, leading to his retirement.

== Race record ==
Date	Age	Distance	Surface	Race	Grade	Track	Finish	Winning (losing) margin
April 29, 1990	2	1300 meters	Turf	Premio Trevero	Maiden	Club Hípico de Santiago	1	5 1/2 lengths
May 27, 1990	2	1600 meters	Turf	Clásico Raimundo Valdés C.	III	Club Hípico de Santiago	1	9 lengths
June 24,1990	2	1600 meters	Turf	Clásico Alberto Vial Infante	I	Club Hípico de Santiago	1	1 1/4 lengths
September 30, 1990	3	2000 meters	Turf	Clásico Nacional Ricardo Lyon	I	Club Hípico de Santiago	1	8 lengths
October 28, 1990	3	2400 meters	Turf	Clásico El Ensayo	I	Club Hípico de Santiago	1	7 1/4 lengths
December 1, 1990	3	2200 meters	Dirt	Clásico St. Leger	I	Hipódromo Chile	1	1 3/4 lengths
December 30, 1990	3	2000 meters	Turf	Gran Clásico Coronación	I	Club Hípico de Santiago	1	9 lengths
February 3, 1991	3	2400 meters	Turf	Clásico El Derby	I	Valparaiso Sporting Club	1	5 1/2 lengths
July 29, 1991	4	1 mile	Turf	Allowance	Allowance	Del Mar	2	(2 lengths)
October 4, 1991	4	1 1/8 mile	Turf	Allowance	Allowance	Santa Anita	1	3/4 length
November 30, 1991	4	1 1/8 mile	Turf	Citation Handicap	II	Hollywood Park	3	(2 lengths)
September 10, 1992	5	1 1/8 mile	Turf	Allowance	Allowance	Woodbine	1	1/2 length
October 4, 1992	5	1 1/4 mile	Turf	Niagara Handicap	III	Woodbine	4	(1/2 length)
October 18, 1992	5	1 1/2 mile	Turf	Rothmans Ltd. International Stakes	I	Woodbine	4	(3 1/2 lengths)
October 30,1992	5	1 3/8 mile	Turf	Prized Handicap	Listed	Gulfstream Park	5	(4 1/2 lengths)

== Stud career ==
After retiring from racing, Wolf remained in the United States, where he entered stud at Lane's End Farm. There, he struggled to attract quality mares. In 1996, Wolf was acquired by the Turkish National Stud, where he died in 2002. He sired a few stakes winners in Turkey, but had limited success at stud.

== Pedigree ==
Pedigree of Wolf (CHI), dark bay or brown stallion, foaled August 19, 1987
Sire Domineau (USA) 1976	Never Bend (USA); 1960	Nasrullah (GB)	Nearco (ITY)
Sire Domineau (USA) 1976	Never Bend (USA); 1960	Nasrullah (GB)	Mumtaz Begum (FR)
Sire Domineau (USA) 1976	Never Bend (USA); 1960	Lalun (USA)	Djeddah (FR)
Sire Domineau (USA) 1976	Never Bend (USA); 1960	Lalun (USA)	Be Faithful (USA)
Sire Domineau (USA) 1976	Pop's Pick (USA); 1969	Ways and Means (USA)	Ambiorix (FR)
Sire Domineau (USA) 1976	Pop's Pick (USA); 1969	Ways and Means (USA)	Stepping Stone (USA)
Sire Domineau (USA) 1976	Pop's Pick (USA); 1969	Just a Chance (USA)	Jester (USA)
Sire Domineau (USA) 1976	Pop's Pick (USA); 1969	Just a Chance (USA)	Chanced (USA)
Dam Luna Fría (CHI) 1977	Rigel (ARG); 1967	Court Harwell (GB)	Prince Chevalier (FR)
Dam Luna Fría (CHI) 1977	Rigel (ARG); 1967	Court Harwell (GB)	Neutron (GB)
Dam Luna Fría (CHI) 1977	Rigel (ARG); 1967	Rheita (ARG)	Sideral (ARG)
Dam Luna Fría (CHI) 1977	Rigel (ARG); 1967	Rheita (ARG)	Crescent (ARG)
Dam Luna Fría (CHI) 1977	Lunarella (CHI); 1972	Silver Moon (ARG)	Seductor (ARG)
Dam Luna Fría (CHI) 1977	Lunarella (CHI); 1972	Silver Moon (ARG)	Crescent (ARG)
Dam Luna Fría (CHI) 1977	Lunarella (CHI); 1972	Ninarella (CHI)	Naucide (ITY)
Dam Luna Fría (CHI) 1977	Lunarella (CHI); 1972	Ninarella (CHI)	Anatuya (ARG)

Wolf is inbred 4D × 4D to Crescent, meaning Crescent appears twice in the fourth generation on the dam's side of the pedigree. Wolf is also inbred 4D x 5D to Seductor and 5S x 5D to Nogara.

== See also ==
- Triple Crown of Thoroughbred Racing
- List of leading Thoroughbred racehorses
