= Without Further Ado =

Without Further Ado may refer to:

- "Without Further Ado" (Queer Eye), a 2019 episode of the American reality television series
- Without Further Ado, Vol 1, 2025 album by Christian McBride

== See also ==
- Further Ado
