= Clásico El Derby =

Group 1 Chilean horse race

- Class: Group 1
- Location: Valparaiso Sporting Club; Viña del Mar, Chile
- Inaugurated: 1885
- Race type: Flat / Thoroughbred
- Sponsor: Mega

Race information
- Distance: 2400m
- Surface: Turf
- Track: Left-handed
- Qualification: Three-year-olds
- Weight: 57 kg
- Purse: CLP$94,500,000 (2026); 1st: CLP$70,000,000

The Clásico El Derby is a Group 1 flat horse race in Chile open to three-year-olds, run at Valparaiso Sporting Club in Santiago, run over a distance of 2400 metres (1.5 mi). The race was first run in 1885 and makes up the third leg of the Chilean Triple Crown. El Derby is considered one of the most prestigious races in Chilean horse racing.

== History ==
When Valparaíso Sporting Club began operation, an imitation of the English Epsom Derby was one of the first races to be established. Purse money would only be distributed if the final time for the race didn't exceed 2:51.

The first edition of El Derby was run on October 22, 1885, won by Cachapoal II. The final time was 2:52 1/2, exceeding that of the threshold for the race to be considered valid and prize money distributed. However, the officials of the racetrack eventually decided to distribute the purse anyway.

In 1892, the race was closed to non-breeding animals, meaning geldings were no longer eligible.

Ever since its inauguration, El Derby has been run over the same distance of 2400 meters, and is generally run in February. Originally, the race was run in December, switching over in the early 20th-century.

El Derby was also originally open to mixed-breed or "mestizo" horses. They were later excluded at some point after 1906.

Priority entry is given to graded stakes winners. Horses that place in the important prep race the Group 2 Copa Jackson also receive priority entry, although below that of stakes winners.

== Records ==
Speed Record:

- 2:23.34 – Solaria (2014)

Greatest winning margin:

- 10 lengths – Rebeca (1903)

Most wins by a jockey:

- 7 – Sergio Vásquez (1979, 1980, 1981, 1982, 1988, 1990, 1992)
- 6 – E. Araya (1957, 1959, 1961, 1964, 1965, 1968)
- 5 – J.M. Baeza (1916, 1927, 1933, 1934, 1935)
- 5 – O. Ulloa (1939, 1940, 1942, 1943, 1948)
- 5 – Ányelo Rivera (1998, 2001, 2002, 2003, 2004)
- 4 – S. Ibarra (1893, 1895, 1898, 1899)
- 4 – Héctor I. Berríos (2009, 2010, 2015, 2018)

Most wins by a trainer:

- 7 – Juan Pablo Baeza (2009, 2010, 2012, 2014, 2016, 2017, 2020)
- 5 – Augusto Breque Espinoza (1957, 1963, 1965, 1969, 1970)
- 4 – Juan Cavieres M. (1954, 1955, 1961, 1962)
- 4 – Juan Cavieres A. (1982, 1999, 2003, 2022)

Most wins by an owner (since 1954):

- 4 – Haras Matancilla (1981, 1982, 1989, 1990)
- 4 – Stud Haras Don Alberto (2022, 2023, 2025, 2026)

Most wins by a breeder:

- 8 – Haras Santa Isabela (1920, 1928, 1933, 1934, 1959, 1962, 1966, 1975)
- 8 – Haras Matancilla (1981, 1982, 1989, 1990, 2001, 2002, 2005, 2012)
- 7 – Stud Haras Don Alberto (1995, 2009, 2019, 2022, 2023, 2025, 2026)
- 5 – Haras Curiche (1961, 1964, 1972, 1979, 1984)
- 4 – Haras Cunaco (1917, 1923, 1936, 1937)

== Winners ==
Year	Winner	Jockey	Trainer	Owner	Breeder	Time	Margin	Ref
2026	Teao	Luis Torres	Julio Orellana	Stud El Tata	Stud Haras Don Alberto	2:25.42	1/2 head	
2025	Lucky Red	Joaquin Herrera	Julio Orellana	Stud Haras Don Alberto	Stud Haras Don Alberto	2:26.04	1 1/4 lengths	
2024	Kay Army	Oscar Ulloa	Juan Baeza	Stud Identic	Haras Agricola Taomina Ltda.	2:25.10	6 1/4 lengths	
2023	Fortino	Oscar Ulloa	Juan Baeza	Stud Haras Don Alberto	Stud Haras Don Alberto	2:26.22	2 1/4 lengths	
2022	Nenúfar Azul	Jaime Medina	Juan Cavieres A.	Stud Haras Don Alberto	Stud Haras Don Alberto	2:27.02	1/2 head	
2021	Preparante	Guillermo Pontigo	Oscar Silva	Stud Jujuy	Haras Matriarca	2:25.29	4 1/4 lengths	
2020	War Breeze	Gonzalo Ulloa	Juan Pablo Baeza	Stud Identic	Agrícola Taomina Ltda.	2:26.01	1 3/4 lengths	
2019	Ya Primo	Jeremy Laprida	Guillermo Aguirre A.	Stud La Pacitca	Stud Haras Don Alberto	2:24.13	4 1/2 lengths	
2018	Leitone	Héctor I. Berríos	John Pinochet	Stud Ferro	Haras Sumaya	2:25.74	1 1/4 lengths	
2017	Full of Luck	Jorge A. González	Juan Pablo Baeza	Stud Quinchao	Haras Paso Nevado	2:26.41	1 length	
2016	Rio Allipen	Hernán E. Ulloa	Juan Pablo Baeza	Stud R. T.	Patricio Baeza A.	2:25.13	1 1/2 lengths	
2015	Il Campione	Héctor I. Berríos	Sergio Inda	Stud Alvidal	Haras Paso Nevado	2:24.05	9 1/4 lengths	
2014	Solaria ƒ	Gonzalo Ulloa	Juan Pablo Baeza	Stud Vendaval	Haras Paso Nevado	2:23.34	7 lengths	
2013	Don Dionisio	Elías Toledo C.	Carlos Bagú R.	Stud D'Sanfuent	Haras Dadinco	2:26.31	Neck	
2012	Quick Casablanca	Gonzalo Ulloa	Juan Pablo Baeza	Stud Carillanca	Haras Matancilla	2:25.16	3 3/4 lengths	
2011	Ashtar	Jaime Medina	Fernando Solar	Stud Monin	Haras Carloca	2:25.50	1 1/4 lengths	
2010	Casablanca Smile ƒ	Héctor I. Berríos	Juan Pablo Baeza	Stud Carillanca	Haras El Sheik	2:24.98	6 lengths	
2009	Amor de Pobre	Héctor I. Berríos	Juan Pablo Baeza	Stud Haras Don Alberto	Stud Haras Don Alberto	2:27.36	2 1/4 lengths	
2008	Paloma Infiel ƒ	Rafael Cisternas	Héctor Castillo	Haras El Sheik	Haras El Sheik	2:26.62	1/2 head	
2007	Hush Money ƒ	Hernán E. Ulloa	Guillermo Aguirre A.	Stud Fe Grande	Haras De Pirque	2:27.17	1 1/2 lengths	
2006	Porfido	Luis Torres	Jorge Inda M.	Haras Sumaya	Haras Sumaya	2:24.78	2 3/4 lengths	
2005	Cefalú	Manuel Martínez	Alfredo Bagú	Stud Milán	Haras Matancilla	2:25.05	4 1/4 lengths	
2004	Mocito Frescolín	Ányelo Rivera	Emilio Quiroga	Stud Guzo	Haras Santa Olga	2:26.25		
2003	Showbiz	Ányelo Rivera	Juan Cavieres A.	Stud El Cedro	Haras Santa Mariana	2:23.35	3/4 length	
2002	Mister Acpen	Ányelo Rivera	Jorge Inda G.	Doña Juanita	Haras Matancilla	2:26.6	1 length	
2001	Millalonco	Ányelo Rivera	Javier Conejeros	Stud Colo Colo	Haras Matancilla	2:26 2/5	3 1/4 lengths	
2000	El Aragonés	Joao Castillo	Pedro Melej	Stud Elenita	Haras Santa Eladia	2:26 2/5	1 length	
1999	Val Gardena ƒ	Luis Torres	Juan Cavieres A.	Doña Sofia	Haras Figurón	2:26 1/5	Head	
1998	Mash One	Ányelo Rivera	Domingo Mette	Haras Trafalgar	Haras Santa Eladia	2:26	2 lengths	
1997	Mete Bulla	Óscar Escobar	Manuel Velarde	Stud Joih	Haras Santa Olga	2:26 3/5	2 3/4 lengths	
1996	Rue Cambon ƒ	Pedro Santos	Alfredo Bagú	Arícola Aboughazaleh	Haras Figurón	2:26 1/5	1 3/4 lengths	
1995	Pradilla ƒ	Pedro Santos	Oscar González	Stud Trily	Stud Haras Don Alberto	2:26 1/5	4 1/4 lengths	
1994	Enfático*	Pedro Santos	Alfredo Bagú	Stud Tres Mosqueteros	Haras Cullinhue	2:26 2/5	DQ	
1993	Doy La Guerra	Gustavo Barrera	Francisco Castro	Stud Azul y Blanco	Haras Scelto	2:26 3/5	3/4 length	
1992	Falling	Sergio Vásquez	Samuel Fuentes	Stud Eni	Argentine breeder	2:25 2/5	2 3/4 lengths	
1991	Wolf	Luis Muñoz	José Tomás Allende	Haras Santa Amelia	Haras Santa Amelia	2:25 1/5	5 1/2 lengths	
1990	Chango	Sergio Vásquez	Antonio Bullezú M.	Haras Matancilla	Haras Matancilla	2:25	1 1/2 lengths	
1989	María Candela ƒ	Gustavo Barrera	Pedro Medina	Haras Matancilla	Haras Matancilla	2:27 4/5	1 1/4 lengths	
1988	Dorticós	Sergio Vásquez	Jorge Inda M.	Stud Cinco Estresllas	Haras Santa Amelia	2:26	V. Perc.	
1987	Par Ten	Luis Muñoz	Teófilo Jacial	Stud Castilla	Haras Figurón	2:26 2/5	Neck	
1986	Baalbek	Manuel Santos	Francisco Castro	Stud Jockey	Haras Siete Estrellas	2:28 1/5	3/4 length	
1985	Chasco	Alberto Poblete	Pedro Melej.	Stud Doña Cristina	Haras Tarapacá	2:26 2/5	Neck	
1984	Semillero	Gustavo Barrera	Antonio Bullezú M.	Helen Hoch	Haras Curiche	2:29	1/2 neck	
1983	Músico Brok	Jaime Díaz	Jorge Inda	Stud Francisca	Benjamín Lagos S.	2:27	1 1/4 lengths	
1982	Marínbula ƒ	Sergio Vásquez	Juan Cavieres A.	Haras Matancilla	Haras Matancilla	2:24 4/5	2 3/4 lengths	
1981	Premio Nobel	Sergio Vásquez	Pedro Medina	Haras Matancilla	Haras Matancilla	2:27 1/5	1 1/4 lengths	
1980	El Barril	Sergio Vásquez	Alvaro Breque	Bruno Ferrari	Haras Dadinco	2:27 3/5	8 lengths	
1979	Moduño	Sergio Vásquez	Antonio Bullezú N.	Stud R. F.	Haras Curiche	2:26 2/5	8 lengths	
1978	Awake	Juan Barraza	Enrique Carreño	Stud Forestal	Haras Las Primas	2:26 2/5	1 3/4 lengths	
1977	Enrique	Juan Barraza	Alvaro Breque	Stud La Muñeca	Haras Los Lagos	2:28 1/5	1/2 length	
1976	Royal Champion	José M. Aravena	Fernando Jacial A.	Stud Champion	Haras Santa Eladia	2:28 3/5	Head	
1975	Proteísa ƒ	Luis González	Carlos Bagú	Sergio Kohon V.	Haras Santa Isabel	2:27 4/5	1 1/2 lengths	
1974	Jarrow	Carlos Sepúlveda	Juan Silva	Stud Kennedy	Haras Santa Teresa	2:28 3/5	Neck	
1973	Grand Slam	Ernesto Guajardo	Carlos Bagú	Stud Ruta	Haras Agrícola Santere S.A.	2:29 1/5	1/2 length	
1972	Baquiano	Jorge Salinas	Juan Melero	Nelson García Huidobro	Haras Curiche	2:30 2/5	Neck	
1971	El Tirol	Pedro Ulloa	Oscar Silva	Stud Cristal	Haras Santa Amelia	2:28 4/5	1/2 length	
1970	Exótico	Gabriel Meneses	Augusto Breque E.	Stud Tarapacá	Haras Los Lagos	2:29	4 1/2 lengths	
1969	El Vital	C. Astorga	Augusto Breque E.	Stud La Gloria	Haras Llenquehue	2:29 3/5	3/4 length	
1968	Contratodos	E. Araya	Pedro Medina	Stud Ovalle	Haras Alfalfares	2:28 2/5	2 1/2 lengths	
1967	Rayita ƒ	S. Azócar	Luis Romero	Stud Montecarlo	José Abogabir G.	2:27	1/2 lengths	
1966	Prólogo	C. Astorga	César Covarrubias	Stud Santa Isabel	Haras Santa Isabel	2:27 3/5	3 lengths	
1965	Extremado†	C. Pezoa	César Covarrubias	Stud Gatico	Haras Los Lagos	2:30	Dead heat (2 1/2 lengths)	
1965	Malhoa† ƒ	E. Araya	Augusto Breque E.	Alicia Castro A.	Haras Tarapacá	2:30	Dead heat (2 1/2 lengths)	
1964	Kuriñanco	E. Araya	Jorge Inda	Stud Huañuñe	Haras Curiche	2:27	1/2 head	
1963	Cencerro	Héctor Pilar	Augusto Breque	Stud Coapa	Haras San Juan	2:26	1 1/4 lengths	
1962	Rosaleen ƒ	R. Parodi	Juan Cavieres	Stud La Candelaria	Haras Santa Isabel	2:29 4/5	1 length	
1961	La Sexta ƒ	E. Araya	Juan Cavieres	Stud La Bastille	Haras Curiche	2:28	3 lengths	
1960	Relevo	O. Saavedra	Raúl Allen	Stud Santa Olga	Eduardo Ruiz-Tagle H.	2:28 3/5	2 lengths	
1959	Victory	E. Araya	P. Valderrama	Stud Anita	Haras Santa Isabel	2:29 3/5	1 length	
1958	Copihual	O. Olivares	Raúl Allen	Stud Copihual	José Caravia P.	2:30 3/5	1/2 length	
1957	Bristol	E. Araya	Augusto Breque	Stud El Bosque	Haras El Bosque	2:29 3/5	5 lengths	
1956	Eugenia ƒ	L. Espinoza	Valentín Ramírez	Germán Reckmann	Haras Chile	2:29 2/5	3 lengths	
1955	Boabdil	R. Madariaga	Juan Cavieres	Constancio Silva	Haras Las Ortigas	2:28 4/5	1/32 lengths	
1954	Vlasov	A. Poblete	Juan Cavieres	Santiago Lyon S.	Haras La Isla	2:29 4/5	7 lengths	
1953	Intención ƒ	P. Flores			Haras El Huertón	2:29	Neck	
1952	Fascinado	J.F. Marchant			Argentine breeder	2:29 3/5	3 lengths	
1951	Empire	J.F. Marchant			Haras El Candelaria	2:28 1/5	1 length	
1950	Tatai	C. Cruz			Haras San José de Bío Bío	2:29 3/5	6 lengths	
1949	Bálsamo	J. Araya			Haras Ñipaco	2:30	Head	
1948	El Colchagüino	O. Ulloa			Haras El Bosque	2:32 3/5	1 length	
1947	Bromazo	J.F. Marchant			Saturnino J. Unzué	2:31 2/5	1 length	
1946	Tábano	C. Cruz			Luis Alamos B.	2:29 1/5	2 1/2 lengths	
1945	Bufón	A. Gutiérrez			Haras El Bosque	2:29 1/5	Head	
1944	La Bastille II ƒ	F. Santander			Haras Ojo de Agua	2:29	1 length	
1943	Corinto	O. Ulloa			A. Beconi and Suc. L. Beconi	2:38 4/5	1/2 length	
1942	Rival	O. Ulloa			Haras La Isla	2:28	1 1/2 lengths	
1941	Pilcaniyén	M. Quezada			Argentine breeder	2:29 2/5	1 length	
1940	Esperanto	O. Ulloa			Carlos Poudensan	2:32 2/5	1/2 neck	
1939	Grimsby	O. Ulloa			Haras San Juan	2:30 2/5	2 1/2 lengths	
1938	Mister Lee	J. Morales			Haras Los Cipreses	2:32	2 lengths	
1937	Maratón	A. Gutiérrez			Haras Cunaco	2:32 2/5	Neck	
1936	Palais Royal	J. Zuñiga			Haras Cunaco	2:31 1/5	1 length	
1935	Iturbide	J.M. Baeza			Haras Los Cipreses	2:31 4/5	1 1/2 lengths	
1934	Pillería ƒ	J.M. Baeza			Haras Santa Isabel	2:31 4/5	1/2 length	
1933	Rococó	J.M. Baeza			Haras Santa Isabel	2:43 3/5	2 1/2 lengths	
1932	Statuto	A. Gutiérrez			Argentine breeder	2:31 3/5	1 length	
1931	Freire	E. Cáceres			Haras Los Cipreses	2:31 4/5	2 1/2 lengths	
1930	Caloría ƒ	E. Rebolledo			O. y G. Tejeda	2:32 2/5	3/4 length	
1929	Ovieto	V. Jara			Haras Kangaroo	2:31 4/5	2 lengths	
1928	Tutti Frutti	E. Rebolledo			Haras Santa Isabel	2:31 3/5	2 lengths	
1927	El Peral	J.M. Baeza			Ramón Nieto	2:33	2 lengths	
1926	Anastasio	E. Robelledo			Argentina breeder	2:30 2/5	2 1/2 lengths	
1925	Urbión	A. Molina			Haras Pirque	2:35	3/4 length	
1924	Almodóvar	A. Molina			E. Serrano y Cía.	2:32 3/5	3 lengths	
1923	Malakoff	V. Jara			Haras Cunaco	2:32	2 1/2 lengths	
1922	Falkland	J. Salfate			Haras Index	2:34 2/5	1 1/2 lengths	
1921	Bambalina ƒ	A. Molina			Abraham Gatica	2:32 2/5	Neck	
1920	Salpicón	J. Salfate			Haras Santa Isabel	2:32 2/5	1 length	
1919	Calais	V. Jara			Haras Index	2:34 1/5	1 1/4 lengths	
1918	Epsom	J. Salfate			Haras Loreto	2:34 4/5	1 length	
1917	Polonia ƒ	R. Díaz			Haras Cunaco	2:35	1 length	
1916	Dorama ƒ	J.M. Baeza			Samuel Larraín B.	2:32 3/5	2 1/2 lengths	
1915	Pimponia ƒ	H. Michaels			Haras Pirque	2:34 2/5	Head	
1914	Fim	P.P. Cancino			Argentine breeder	2:35	3/4 length	
1913	Huechún	E. Carrillo			Haras Limited	2:39 3/5	1 1/2 lengths	
1912	Brasil II	P. Rebolledo			Haras Ojo de Agua	2:37 3/5	1 1/2 lengths	
1911†	Reverie ƒ	A. Cavieres			Raúl Edwards	2:39 4/5	1/2 length	
1909†	Turín	M. Soto			Enrique Concha S.	2:42	1/2 neck	
1908	Jou Jou	L. Anaya			Haras Pirque	2:39	1 length	
1907	Gallardete ‡	C. Gray			Fundo Collanco	2:36 4/5	1 1/2 lengths	
1906†	Alanés	C. Gray			Roberto Sproat	2:44	6 lengths	
1905	Petrarque ‡	H. Mockridge			H. Anselme	2:44 1/5	1/2 length	
1904	Normandie ƒ	A. Venegas			Haras Ñipaco	2:40 2/5	1 1/2 lengths	
1903	Sybarite ‡	H. Herrera			Julio Aninat	2:42	Neck	
1902	Rebeca ƒ	G. Casanueva			Haras Macul	2:44	10 lengths	
1901	Avellano ‡	P. Rebolledo			Haras Ñipaco	2:45 4/5	1 1/2 lengths	
1900	Cruz Lila ƒ‡	A. Albornoz			Fundo Collanco	2:44	1 1/2 lengths	
1899	Game	G. Pérez				2:47 1/2	1 length	
1898	Fama ƒ	S. Ibarra			Juan Pardo Correa	3:11	3 lengths	
1897	Fátima ƒ‡	S. Ibarra				2:46 4/5	1 1/2 lengths	
1896	Anarquista ‡	A. Albornoz			Justo L. Saxton	2:47 1/2	1/2 length	
1895	Toldería ƒ	F. Cerda			Haras San Jacinto	2:58 1/4		
1894	Triunfo†	S. Ibarra			P. Nolasco Polloni	2:45		
1893	Thunder	F. Cubillos			Agustín R. Ewards	2:46 1/2		
1892	Palmita ƒ‡	S. Ibarra			Fundo Collanco	2:50 1/5		
1891	Valparaíso	F. Moraga			José R. Echevarría	2:46 1/4		
1890	Solong ‡	A. Hernández				2:54		
1889	Orompello ‡	S. Ramírez					Walkover	
1888	Mafra ƒ‡	G. Cubillos			Funco Collanco	2:45		
1887	Wanderer	C.M. Zavala			Agustín R. Edwards	2:48		
1886	Genovés	G. Cubillos			José R. Echevarría	2:51	Long distance	
1885	Cachapoal II	C.M. Zavala			G.S. Porter	2:52 1/2	Multiple lengths	

*Win awarded to Enfático after disqualification of Early Gray

† The 1906 edition was actually run in January of 1907. The 1909 edition was actually run in January of 1910, and the 1911 edition was actually run in January of 1912.

ƒ indicates a filly winner

‡ indicates a mestizo winner
