= Clásico El Ensayo =

Group 1 Chilean horse race

- Class: Group 1
- Location: Club Hípico de Santiago; Santiago, Chile
- Inaugurated: 1873
- Race type: Flat / Thoroughbred
- Sponsor: Mega

Race information
- Distance: 2400m
- Surface: Turf
- Track: Right-handed
- Qualification: Three-year-olds
- Weight: 57 kg
- Purse: CLP$94,500,000 (2025); 1st: CLP$70,000,000

The Clásico El Ensayo, also known as the Clásico El Ensayo Mega for sponsorship reasons, is a Group 1 flat horse race in Chile open to three-year-olds, run at Club Hípico de Santiago in Santiago, run over a distance of 2,400 metres (1.5 mi). The race was first held in 1873, making it the fourth oldest horse race in the Americas (after the Queen's Plate, Travers Stakes, and Belmont Stakes), and the oldest in Latin America.

It is generally considered the most important horse race in Chile, on par with the Epsom Derby, the American classics, the Prix de l'Arc de Triomphe in France and the Gran Premio Carlos Pellegrini in Argentina. It is the first race in the Chilean Triple Crown.

El Ensayo is restricted to only horses that have won at least one race.

== History ==
The Clásico El Ensayo was first run at a distance of 1200 meters, and has been contested at a variety of distances:

- 1200 meters: 1873–1880
- 1500 meters: 1881–1883
- 1600 meters: 1884–1892
- 1800 meters: 1893–1904, 1908
- 1900 meters: 1905–1907, 1909
- 2000 meters: 1910–1920
- 2300 meters: 1921–1925
- 2400 meters: 1926 to present

Of the first eight editions contested, six were won by horses sired by Fanfarrón.

The greatest upsets were the 104-1 victory of Parral in 1947 and the 98-1 victory of Cambridge in 2018.

In the early twentieth century, imported horses could run in the race, but by the 1950s, the race was restricted to Chilean-bred horses only, a restriction which lasted until 1984.

Starting gates were first used in the 1971 edition.

The running of 1999 was considered the 'feast of fillies', with fillies coming in first, second, third, and fourth.

Since 2004, the race has been consistently timed to one-hundredth of a second.

In 2020, due to the COVID-19 pandemic, the race was run in December instead of its usual date in late October or early November.

== Records ==
Speed Record:

- 2:23.21 – Wolf (1990)
- 2:23 2/5 – Monroe (1986)

Most wins by a jockey:

- 7 – Carlos M. Zavala (1877, 1881, 1882, 1883, 185, 1887, 1891, 1895)
- 6 – Luis Torres (1995, 1999, 2000, 2003, 2005, 2013)
- 5 – Oscar Ulloa (2021, 2022, 2023, 2024, 2025)

Most wins by a trainer:

- 11 – Patricio Baeza (2006, 2009, 2012, 2017, 2019, 2020, 2021, 2022, 2023, 2024, 2025)
- 7 – Juan Cavieres Mella (1922, 1930, 1934, 1938, 1945, 1954, 1960)
- 6 – Juan Cavieres A. (1982, 1983, 1995, 1999, 2000, 2004)

Most wins by an owner (since 1954):

- 5 – Stud Don Alberto (2006, 2008, 2016, 2021, 2022)
- 4 – Stud Matancilla (1980, 1983, 1989, 1992)

Most wins by a breeder:

- 10 – Haras Don Alberto (1994, 2006, 2008, 2016, 2018, 2020, 2021, 2022, 2024, 2025)
- 8 – Haras Santa Isabel (1927, 1963, 1965, 1972, 1974, 1978)
- 8 – Haras Matancilla (1976, 1980, 1983, 1989, 1992, 1999, 2001, 2009)
- 7 – Haras de Pirque (1988, 1998, 2000)
- 7 – Haras Santa Amelia (1968, 1971, 1982, 1990, 1996, 1997, 2004)

== Winners since 1954 ==
Year	Winner	Jockey	Trainer	Owner	Breeder	Time	Ref
2025	Created	Oscar Ulloa	Patricio Baeza A.	Stud Marenga	Stud Haras Don Alberto	2:27.92	
2024	Doña Clota ƒ	Oscar Ulloa	Patricio Baeza A.	Doña Lili	Stud Haras Don Alberto	2:27.20	
2023	Kay Army	Oscar Ulloa	Patricio Baeza A.	Stud Identic	Agricola Taomina Ltda.	2:29.46	
2022	Fortino	Oscar Ulloa	Patricio Baeza A.	Stud Haras Don Alberto	Stud Haras Don Alberto	2:26.87	
2021	Y Nada Másƒ	Oscar Ulloa	Patricio Baeza A.	Stud Haras Don Alberto	Stud Haras Don Alberto	2:27.41	
2020	Breakpoint	Kevin Espina	Patricio Baeza A.	Stud R.T.	Stud Haras Don Alberto	2:29.14	
2019	Look Pen (Note: The 2019 winner Look Pen was later exported to Hong Kong and renamed Panfield)	Gonzalo Ulloa	Patricio Baeza A.	Stud Identic	Agricola Taomina Ltda.	2:26.18	
2018	Cambridge	Pedro Robles	Jorge A. Inda de la C.	Stud Doña Eliana	Stud Haras Don Alberto	2:26.48	
2017	Robert Bruce	Jorge A. Gonzalez	Patricio Baeza A.	Haras Convento Viejo	Haras Convento Viejo	2:26.14	
2016	Color Rosa ƒ	Hernan E. Ulloa	Jorge Inda M.	Stud Haras Don Alberto	Stud Haras Don Alberto	2:25.64	
2015	Wapi ƒ	Gonzalo Ulloa	Juan C. Silva S.	Stud Vendaval	Haras Paso Nevado	2:24.22	
2014	Il Campione	Héctor I. Berríos	Sergio Inda M.	Stud Alvidal	Haras Paso Nevado	2:23.56	
2013	Sposito	Luis Torres	Guillermo Aguirre A.	Haras Curiche	Haras Curiche	2:25.60	
2012	Giant's Steps	Héctor I. Berríos	Patricio Baeza A.	Los Tanderos	Haras Puerta de Hierro	2:27.11	
2011	Dime Que	Elías Toledo	Miguel Medina T.	Haras Porta Pía	Haras Porta Pía	2:25.03	
2010	El Farrero	Fernando Díaz	Jorge Inda M.	Stud Masaiva	Haras Paso Nevado	2:25.60	
2009	Belle Watling ƒ	Héctor I. Berríos	Patricio Baeza A.	Stud Don Theo	Haras Matancilla	2:24.54	
2008	Stolen Heart ƒ	Victor Miranda	Gerardo Silva B.	Stud Haras Don Alberto	Stud Haras Don Alberto	2:27.33	
2007	Paloma Infiel ƒ	Rafael Cisternas	Héctor Castillo S.	Haras El Sheik	Haras El Sheik	2:26.84	
2006	Eres Magica ƒ	Fernando Díaz	Patricio Baeza A.	Stud Haras Don Alberto	Stud Haras Don Alberto	2:24.95	
2005	Porfido	Luis Torres	Jorge Inda M.	Haras Sumaya	Haras Sumaya	2:26.09	
2004	Pecoiquen	Claudio Acevedo	Juan Cavieres A.	Stanamelino	Haras Santa Amelia	2:24.94	
2003	Pel	Luis Torres	Pedro Polanco B.	Kokekil	Haras Casablanca	2:26.20	
2002	Veedor	Gonzalo Ulloa	Juan Silva G.	Stud Vendaval	Haras Paso Nevado	2:27.60	
2001	Crisantemo	Gustavo Barrera	Emilio Quiroga I.	Stud Guzo	Haras Matancilla	2:24.60	
2000	Penamacor	Luis Torres	Juan Cavieres A.	Stud Guha	Haras de Pirque	2:26.00	
1999	Crystal House ƒ	Luis Torres	Juan Cavieres A.	Stud El Cedro	Haras Matancilla	2:26.1	
1998	Perssonet	Johann Albornoz	Samuel Fuentes P.	Haras Rio Enco	Haras de Pirque	2:27.0	
1997	Pompeyo	Héctor Barrera	José T. Allende F.	Stud Panguipulli	Haras Santa Amelia	2:24.1	
1996	Dancing Place	Luis Muñoz	José T. Allende F.	Stud Santa Amelia	Haras Santa Amelia	2:25.3	
1995	Husares	Luis Torres	Juan Cavieres A.	Stud Soledad	Haras Villa Rosa	2:27.3	
1994	Pradilla ƒ	Pedro Santos	Oscar Gonzalez G.	Stud Trily	Stud Haras Don Alberto	2:26.0	
1993	Early Gray	Héctor Salazar	Jorge Inda G.	Stud Cinzia	Haras Picoltue	2:25.1	
1992	Penumbra ƒ	Luis Muñoz	Alvaro Breque V.	Stud Matancilla	Haras Matancilla	2:28.3	
1991	Porta Pia ƒ	Héctor Salazar	Alfredo Bagu R.	Stud Don Cotto	Haras Figuron	2:26.0	
1990	Wolf	Luis Muñoz	José T. Allende F.	Haras Santa Amelia	Haras Santa Amelia	2:23.21	
1989	Chango	Sergio Vásquez	Antonio Bullezú M.	Stud Matancilla	Haras Matancilla	2:24.4	
1988	Charlatán	Sergio Vásquez	Teófilo Jacial A.	Teófilo Jacial A.	Haras Blackie	2:23.4	
1987	Warrior	Oscar Escobar	Alfonso Zamorano B.	Stud Martino	Haras Martino	2:25.0	
1986	Monroe	Juan Barraza	José Melero B.	Stud SUR	Haras Villa Rosa	2:23.2	
1985	Lamentado	Gustavo Barrera	Alvaro Breque V.	Stud Cimera	Haras Dadinco	2:26.2	
1984	Punch	Roberto Pérez	Antonio Bullezú N.	Stud El Bosque	Haras Pucudegua	2:25 4/5	
1983	Lonquimay	Sergio Vásquez	Juan Cavieres A.	Stud Matancilla	Haras Matancilla	2:24	
1982	Chesterton	Sergio Vásquez	Juan Cavieres A.	Patricio Baeza A.	Haras Santa Amelia	2:25 2/5	
1981	Saint Mesme	Claudio Leighton	Pedro Bagú H.	Stud Ibiza	Haras La Capilla	2:25	
1980	Premio Nobel	Elías Silva	Pedro Medina Ch.	Stud Matancilla	Haras Matancilla	2:25 1/5	
1979	Songe Bleu ƒ	Claudio Leighton	Aquiles E. Martínez	Stud Titi		2:30	
1978	Person	Alberto Poblete	Teófilo Jacial A.	Stud Castilla	Haras Santa Isabel	2:26 3/5	
1977	Clear Song	Alberto Poblete	Oscar Silva G.	Stud Max Val	Haras Santa Cecilia	2:27 2/5	
1976	Galeno	Rodrigo Cea	Pedro Medina Ch.	Stud Sonia	Haras Matancilla	2:29	
1975	Royal Champion	José M. Aravena	Fernando Jacial A.	Stud Champion	Haras Santa Eladia	2:28 1/5	
1974	Strong	José M. Aravena	Antonio Bullezú N.	Stud Chimbarongo	Haras Santa Isabel	2:28 3/5	
1973	Espadaña ƒ	Carlos Rivera	Victorino Romo	Stud Macul	Haras El Bosque	2:28 2/5	
1972	Protectora ƒ	Valentín Ubilla	Delfin Bernal	Sergio Kohon	Haras Santa Isabel	2:26 2/5	
1971	El Tirón	Carlos A. Pezoa	Ernesto Inda G.	Stud Los Conejitos	Haras Santa Amelia	2:27	
1970	Naspur	Carlos Sepúlveda	César Covarrubias V.	Haras El Bosque	Haras El Bosque	2:26 4/5	
1969	Vagabundo	Carlos Astorga	Alvaro Breque V.	Haras Dadinco	Haras Scelto	2:26 1/5	
1968	Zenith	Aurelio Nuñez	Luis Gajardo	Stud Zenit	Haras Santa Amelia	2:28 1/5	
1967	Quilche	Héctor Pilar	Alvaro Breque V.	Stud Arizcún	Haras Scelto	2:26 4/5	
1966	Rayita ƒ	Aurelio Nuñez	Luis Romero	Stud Montecarlo	Haras Los Helechos	2:26	
1965	Prólogo	Carlos Astorga	César Covarrubias V.	Stud Santa Isabel	Haras Santa Isabel	2:27 4/5	
1964	Maporal	Sergio Vera	Jorge Inda G.	Stud Capri		2:28 3/5	
1963	Par de Ases	Enrique Araya	Osvaldo Jara	Stud L. O. S. O.	Haras Santa Isabel	2:28	
1962	Curiche	Luis Espinoza	Luis Espinoza	Estanislao Anguita A.	Haras Curiche	2:27	
1961	Miss Therese ƒ	Rogelio Parodi	Jorge Inda G.	Stud Capri		2:27	
1960	La Sexta ƒ	Enrique Araya	Juan Cavieres M.	Stud La Bastille	Haras Curiche	2:26	
1959	Maritain	Pedro Ulloa	Antonio Bullezú N.	Stud Anita		2:30 3/5	
1958	Tolpán	Omar Olivares	Fernando León F.	Stud Haras Victoria	Haras Victoria	2:27 2/5	
1957	Babú	Enrique Araya	Alvaro Breque V.	Stud La Candelaria	Haras La Soledad	2:28	
1956	Aysha ƒ	A. Salazar	Carlos Rodríguez	Stud Effie	Haras San Juan	2:28 1/5	
1955	Eugenia ƒ	Luis Espinoza	Valentín Ramírez	Germán Reckman		2:28 2/5	
1954	Provita ƒ	Alfonso Poblete	Juan Cavieres M.	Santiago Lyon S.	Haras La Isla	2:28 3/5	

ƒ indicates a filly winner

== Earlier winners ==
- 1873: Dinorah* ƒ
- 1874: Pensamiento* ƒ
- 1875: Gavilán*
- 1876: Reina Mora* ƒ
- 1877: Danubio
- 1878: Pilpilco*
- 1879: Moro*
- 1880: Godolphin*
- 1881: Liguria*
- 1882: Pisco
- 1883: Miraflores ƒ
- 1884: Esperanza† ƒ
- 1885: Cachaporal
- 1886: Genovés
- 1887: Wanderer
- 1888: Querelema* ƒ
- 1889: Orompello*
- 1890: Rosicler*
- 1891: Sky ƒ
- 1892: Floriana* ƒ
- 1893: Thunder*
- 1894: Triunfo*
- 1895: Toldería ƒ
- 1896: Gibelet
- 1897: Oro
- 1898: Orbetello*
- 1899: Game*
- 1900: Paulette* ƒ
- 1901: Nanette ƒ
- 1902: Rebeca ƒ
- 1903: Yolanda* ƒ
- 1904: Nutmeg* ƒ
- 1905: Petrarque*
- 1906: Hasard
- 1907: Pehuenco*
- 1908: Jongleur
- 1909: Turín
- 1910: Jaque Mate*
- 1911: Belle Etoile* ƒ
- 1912: Iscariote
- 1913: Sándalo*
- 1914: Rochela ƒ
- 1915: Dorama ƒ
- 1916: Captain*
- 1917: Epsom
- 1918: Cervantes
- 1919: Ugolin
- 1920: Auvernia
- 1921: Flapper
- 1922: Greenock
- 1923: Almodovar
- 1924: Urbión
- 1925: El Ocho
- 1926: Decurión
- 1927: Tutti Frutti
- 1928: Melchor
- 1929: Pierre Loti
- 1930: Freire
- 1931: Trampiato
- 1932: Kashmir ƒ
- 1933: Chansonnier
- 1934: Quemazón ƒ
- 1935: Rokof
- 1936: El Mago
- 1937: Rosarina ƒ
- 1938: Grimsby‡
- 1939: Fouché
- 1940: Filibustero
- 1941: Rival
- 1942: Figaro
- 1943: Quemarropa
- 1944: Barranco
- 1945: Tábano
- 1946: Florete
- 1947: Parral
- 1948: Taimado
- 1949: Olimpo
- 1950: Empire
- 1951: Liberty
- 1952: Antar
- 1953: Saint Oregon

* "Mestizo"; not a pure Thoroughbred. Many early Chilean races, including El Ensayo, were open to "mestizo" horses who weren't full Thoroughbred.

ƒ indicates a filly winner

†Esperanza was declared the winner after the disqualification of Stockwell.

‡Dead-heat between Grimsby and Valeriano, with the win awarded to Grimsby.
