= Further Ado =

Further Ado may refer to:

- Further Ado (horse), American racehorse
- Further Ado, 1997 album by Greg Osby

== See also ==
- Without Further Ado
