= Haras Don Alberto =

Thoroughbred racehorse breeding stables in Chile

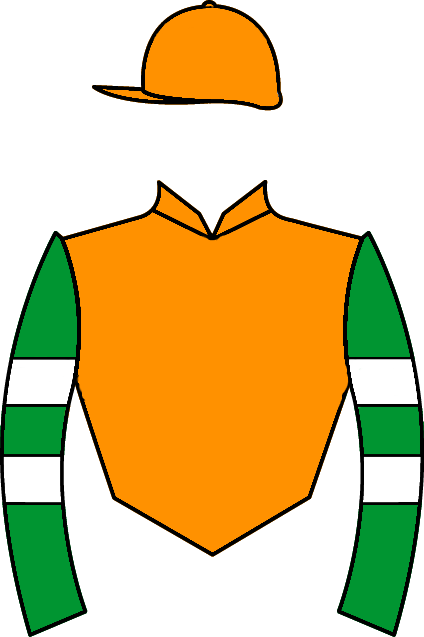
- Racing silks of Haras Don Alberto
- Type: Horse breeding farm and Thoroughbred racing stable
- Industry: Thoroughbred horse racing
- Founded: 1987

Haras Don Alberto (also Stud Haras Don Alberto, Don Alberto Stables) is a thoroughbred racehorse breeding and training farm from Chile that has expanded to include operations in Argentina, England, and the United States. It is a subsidiary of Bethia Holding.

== History ==
Alberto Solari Magnasco founded Haras Tarapacá, which went on to become a successful and notable racehorse farm in Chile. Haras Tarapacá produced notable Chilean racehorses including descendants of the stallion Monterey who was frequently on the leading sire list. Among these were Malhoa, winner of the Tanteo de Potrancas, Clásico El Derby, and Clásico St. Leger, and Megere, winner of the Clásico Arturo Lyon Peña and Clásico Nacional Ricardo Lyon.

In 1987, Alberto's daughter Liliana Solari Falabella, with her sons Andrea and Carlos Heller Solari, purchased land near Los Ángeles, Chile, to found Haras Don Alberto. The farm was named after Alberto Solari Magnasco. The land is low in selenium, requiring the horses to be supplemented.

By 1990, the farm made the list of leading Chilean breeders, ranking at 26th.

In 1994, farming, dairy, and cargo transportation were added to operations and the overall operation became The Bethia Group, named after the farm's first winning racehorse, with Haras Don Alberto as a subsidiary. In 2001, The Bethia Group became a limited public company named Bethia Holding.

Don Alberto purchased the notable Chilean stud farm Haras Matancilla, doubling its holdings in Chile. By 2013, the farm had 300 mares.

On October 11, 2013, Haras Don Alberto paid $13.82 million for Dr. Tom Simon's 417-acre Vinery Stud in Lexington, Kentucky. The purchase increased the farm's American holdings to 1300 acres. Later that year, Haras Don Alberto was the leading buyer by expenditures at the Keeneland November Bloodstock Sale, purchasing 32 horses for $10.64 million. Five more mares were purchased for $2.95 million at Fasig-Tipton. At Tattersalls, 6 horses were purchased for 1.77 million guineas, with the mare Chrysanthemum (in foal to Frankel) being purchased afterward in a private treaty.

In 2016, the farm expanded into Argentina. Three years later, after disappointing results, they withdrew from Argentina moving the horses there to Chile.

The farm had its first Grade 1 win in the United States in 2017, when Unique Bella won the La Brea Stakes.

When Haras La Biznaga was liquidated in 2018, Haras Don Alberto purchased 6 of the 10 highest-selling lots, including record-setting Argentine purchases of Giant Remex and Giant Marked for $260,000 each.

By 2019, the Chilean farm had 400 mares and was producing about 300 foals a year, and the Lexington farm had 125 mares.

Haras Don Alberto purchased the most expensive yearling in the United States in 2021, a $2.6 million colt by Into Mischief out of Paola Queen, by Flatter.

The farm had its first US-bred G1 winner in 2023 when Arcangelo won the Belmont Stakes. That year, the farm was fifth on the American list of leading breeders and led the Chilean breeders list.

== Notable horses ==
=== Stallions ===
- Seeking the Dia – Leading sire in Chile in 2016 and 2022, 3rd in 2015 and 2023, 4th in 2017, 2020, and 2021, 5th in 2014 and 2018; 5th on the Chilean broodmare sire list in 2020
- Constitution – Leading sire in Chile in 2021, and 2023, 2nd in 2020
- Lookin at Lucky – 2009 American Champion Two-Year-Old Male and 2010 American Champion Three-Year-Old Male; leading sire in Chile in 2017 and 2018, 2nd in 2019 and 2022, 3rd in 2020, 4th in 2023
- Mastercraftsman – Leading sire in Chile in 2019, 4th in 2018, 5th in 2020
- Stuka – Leading sire in Chile in 2007, 2nd in 2008 and 2009, 3rd in 2006 and 2011; 2nd on Chilean broodmare sire list in 2013 and 2019, 3rd in 2014–2018 and 2020, and 4th in 2012 and 2022
- Fusaichi Pegasus – Winner of the 2000 Kentucky Derby, 10th on the Chilean general sire list in 2014, 5th on the Chilean broodmare sire list in 2022 and 2023
- Bluegrass Cat – G1 winner in the United States
- Dylan Thomas – Winner of the 2007 Prix de l'Arc de Triomphe, Irish Champion Stakes, and King George VI and Queen Elizabeth Stakes, etc.
- Henrythenavigator – Winner of the 2008 Irish 2000 Guineas and 2000 Guineas
- Holy Roman Emperor – G1 winner in Ireland and France
- Rock of Gibraltar – 2nd on Chilean general sire list in 2016
- Proud Citizen – 4th on Chilean broodmare sire list in 2019
- Stevie Wonderboy – Winner of the 2005 Breeders' Cup Juvenile
- Tourist – Winner of the 2016 Breeders' Cup Mile

=== As a breeder ===
- Pradilla (1991) – Winner of the 1994 Polla de Potrancas and Clásico El Ensayo and 1995 Clásico El Derby
- Total Impact (1998) – Winner of the 2001 Tanteo de Potrillos
- Trotamondo (2001) – 2005 Chilean co-Horse of the Year and co-Champion Three-Year-Old Male, winner of the Dos Mil Guineas, Gran Criterium, and Clásico St. Leger
- Last Impact (2002) – 2007/08 Chilean Champion Grass Horse, 2008/09 Chilean Horse of the Year, Champion Older Male Horse, and Champion Grass Horse, winner of the 2009 Gran Premio Hipódromo Chile and Clásico Club Hípico de Santiago
- Top Casablanca (2011) – 2016/17 Chilean Champion Older Male Horse, winner of the 2014 Dos Mil Guineas and 2017 Clásico Club Hípico de Santiago
- Marie Madelaine (2013) – 2016/17 Chilean Champion Three-Year-Old Female, winner of the 2016 Clásico Las Oaks
- Penn Rose (2014) – 2017/18 and 2018/19 Chilean Champion Older Female Horse, winner of the 2017 Clásico Las Oaks
- Tamburo Di Oro (2014) – Winner of 2019 Clásico Club Hípico de Santiago
- Ya Primo (2015) – 2018/19 Chilean Horse of the Year and Champion Three-Year-Old Male, winner of the 2019 Clásico El Derby and Gran Premio Latinoamericano, etc.
- Breakpoint (2017) – 2020/21 Chilean Champion Three-Year-Old Male, winner of the 2020 Polla de Potrillos, Clásico Nacional Ricardo Lyon, Clásico El Ensayo and 2022 San Juan Capistrano Stakes
- Y Nada Mas (2018) – 2021/22 Chilean Champion Three-Year-Old Female, winner of the 2023 Clásico Nacional Ricardo Lyon, Clásico Las Oaks, Clásico El Ensayo
- Fortino (2019) – Chilean Triple Crown winner, 2022/23 Chilean Horse of the Year and Champion Three-Year-Old Male, winner of the 2022 Clásico El Derby, Clásico El Ensayo, Clásico St. Leger, and Clásico Alberto Vial Infante
- Lukka (2019) – 2022/23 Chilean Champion Older Male Horse, winner of the 2023 Gran Premio Hipódromo Chile and Clásico Club Hípico de Santiago
- Arcangelo (2020) – 2023 American Champion Three-Year-Old Male, winner of the 2023 Belmont Stakes and Travers Stakes, etc.
- Muth (2021) – Winner of the 2023 American Pharoah Stakes and 2024 Arkansas Derby
- Journalism (2022) – Winner of the 2025 Santa Anita Derby, Preakness Stakes and Haskell Stakes, etc.

=== As an owner ===
(excluding horses also bred)

- Battle of Midway (2014) – Winner of the 2017 Breeders' Cup Dirt Mile; owned in partnership with WinStar Farm
- Unique Bella (2014) – 2017 American Champion Female Sprint Horse and 2018 American Champion Older Dirt Female Horse, winner of the 2017 La Brea Stakes, 2018 Beholder Mile Stakes and Clement L. Hirsch Stakes, etc.

== Awards and rankings ==
- Haras Don Alberto led the Chilean breeders list (ordered by number of wins) in 2004–2006 and 2011–2023. In addition, they were 2nd in 1998–1999 and 2007–2010, 3rd in 1994, 1996, and 2000–2002, and 4th in 2003.
- Stud Haras Don Alberto led the Chilean owners list (order by number of wins) in 2007–2016 and 2023. In addition, they were 2nd in 2017, 3rd in 2018–2019, and 4th in 2006 and 2021.
