= Furthest Land =

American-bred Thoroughbred racehorse

- Sire: Smart Strike
- Grandsire: Mr. Prospector
- Dam: Flagrant
- Damsire: Rahy
- Sex: Gelding
- Foaled: 2005
- Country: United States
- Colour: Bay
- Breeder: Catherine Wills
- Owner: Ken & Sarah Ramsey
- Trainer: Michael J. Maker
- Record: 16: 8-2-1
- Earnings: US$$869,689

Major wins
- Kentucky Cup Classic Stakes (2009) Breeders' Cup wins: Breeders' Cup Dirt Mile (2009)
- Last updated on April 11, 2010

Furthest Land (foaled 2005 in Kentucky) is an American Thoroughbred racehorse. Bred by Catherine Wills, Furthest Land is the first registered foal from the unraced mare, Flagrant, a daughter of Rahy. He was a former claimer for $35,000 who, under the ownership of Ken and Sarah Ramsey, won the 2009 Breeders' Cup Dirt Mile by 3/4 length over Ready's Echo and heavily favored Midshipman.
