= Cody's Wish =

American-bred Thoroughbred racehorse

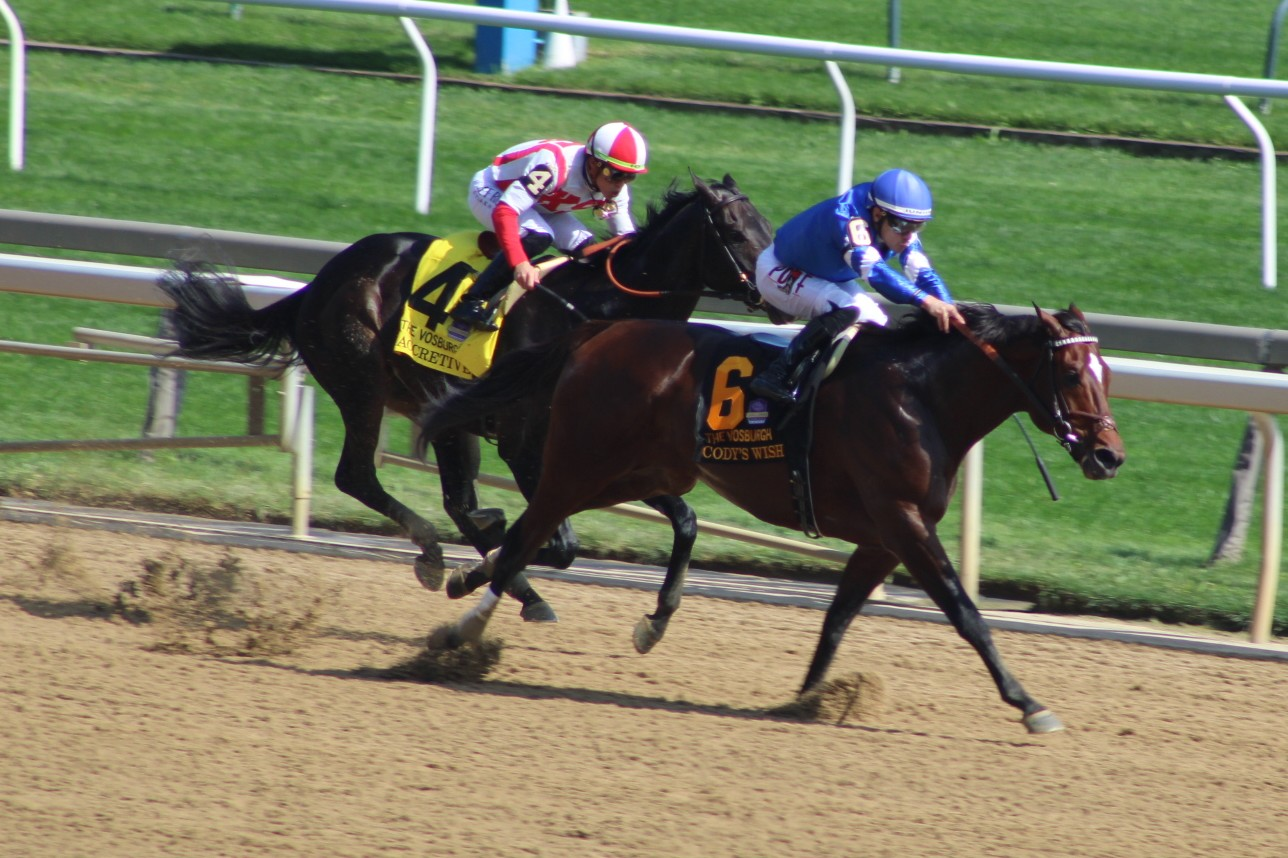
- Cody's Wish running past Accretive to win the Vosburgh Stakes
- Breed: Thoroughbred
- Sire: Curlin
- Grandsire: Smart Strike
- Dam: Dance Card
- Damsire: Tapit
- Sex: Stallion
- Foaled: May 3, 2018 (age 7)
- Country: United States
- Colour: Bay
- Breeder: Godolphin
- Owner: Godolphin
- Trainer: William I. Mott
- Record: 16: 11-1-4
- Earnings: US$3,106,030

Major wins
- Forego Stakes (2022); Westchester Stakes (2022); Churchill Downs Stakes (2023); Metropolitan Handicap (2023); Vosburgh Stakes (2023); Breeders' Cup wins: Breeders' Cup Dirt Mile (2022, 2023)

Awards
- American Horse of the Year (2023); American Champion Older Dirt Male Horse (2023); Secretariat Vox Populi Award (2022, 2023)
- Last updated on January 25, 2024

Cody's Wish (born 3 May 2018) is a retired multiple Grade I winning American Thoroughbred racehorse and the American Horse of the Year for 2023. He is a two-time winner of the Breeders' Cup Dirt Mile. In 2022 he was a winner in four of his five starts–all stakes races–including two Grade I victories in the Forego Stakes at Saratoga and the Breeders' Cup Dirt Mile at Keeneland. In 2023 he again won four of his five starts, winning the Grade I Metropolitan Handicap, Grade I Churchill Downs Stakes and Grade II Vosburgh Stakes before defending his title in the Breeders' Cup Dirt Mile at Santa Anita Park. Named after the late Cody Dorman, a native of Richmond, Kentucky who was born with Wolf–Hirschhorn syndrome and had attended several races throughout the horse's career, Cody's Wish was the winner of the Secretariat Vox Populi Award in 2022 and 2023.

== Background ==
Cody's Wish's sire is Curlin, recipient of American Horse of the Year honors in 2007 and 2008. The damsire of Cody's Wish is Tapit, consistently among the leading sires in North America, having sired such champions as Untapable, Frosted, Essential Quality, and Flightline. He was bred in Kentucky by owner Godolphin Racing.

Trained by Bill Mott, Cody's Wish is named after the late Cody Dorman, a native of Richmond, Kentucky who was born with Wolf–Hirschhorn syndrome. As a result of the syndrome, Dorman used a wheelchair and communicated with a tablet. In 2018, while on a visit to Godolphin's Gainsborough Farm in Versailles sponsored by the Make-A-Wish Foundation and Keeneland, he met a young foal by Curlin who immediately interacted with him and laid his head on Dorman's lap. The weanling was later named Cody's Wish in Cody's honor. On November 5, 2023, one day after Cody's Wish's repeat victory at the Breeders' Cup, Cody Dorman suffered a medical event while returning home to Kentucky and died at the age of 17. His death was announced by his family the following day.

== Racing career ==
=== 2021: three-year-old season ===
Cody's Wish began his racing career at the age of three. After three third-place finishes at Belmont Park and Saratoga, Cody's Wish broke his maiden in October at Churchill Downs going one mile, with his namesake Cody Dorman in attendance.

Cody's Wish finished the season with two more victories at Churchill in allowance company.

=== 2022: four-year-old season ===
Cody's Wish's 2022 campaign began with a second-place finish in the Challenger Stakes at Tampa Bay Downs. He was then sent to Belmont Park's Westchester Stakes in May, beating the short 5-horse field by five lengths.

After returning to Churchill to narrowly win the Hanshin Stakes, Cody's Wish was entered in the Grade I Forego Stakes at Saratoga going seven furlongs. After misbehaving in the starting gate, he settled toward the back of the seven-horse field, eventually roused by Junior Alvarado around the turn. He entered the stretch seven wide off the rail and rallied to upset champion Jackie's Warrior, who was softened up after being pressed for the lead, by 1 1/2 lengths.

News of Cody Dorman and the horse named after him became more prominent in the period leading up to Cody's Wish's next start in the Breeders' Cup Dirt Mile at Keeneland. When asked about the horse's chances before the race, Cody replied, "He will win." Cody's Wish started from post 6 in the nine-horse Dirt Mile field, with Dorman allowed to watch the race from the winner's circle. Again breaking slowly and traveling at the rear of the field, Cody's Wish rallied while wide on the final turn, passing Cyberknife in the stretch and winning by a head. NBC Sports race caller Larry Collmus summed up the finish with these words: "Oh, the wish has come true! That one's for you, Cody!"

Cody's Wish was named the 2022 winner of the Secretariat Vox Populi Award, which recognizes horses whose racing excellence best resounded with the public. Dorman was awarded with the Big Sport of Turfdom Award by the Thoroughbred Publicists of America, which is given annually to those that enhance coverage of Thoroughbred racing through cooperation with media and racing publicists.

Michael Banahan, director of bloodstock for Godolphin's U.S. operations, confirmed after the Breeders' Cup that Cody's Wish would remain in training for a 2023 campaign.

=== 2023: five-year-old season ===
In his first race as a five-year-old, the favorite Cody's Wish won the 2023 Churchill Downs Stakes for his fifth victory in a row. The NBC broadcast included a feature on Cody's Wish and Dorman, who attended the race.

On June 10, Cody's Wish was the 13/20 odds-on favorite in the GI Metropolitan Handicap at Belmont Park. Jockey Junior Alvarado quickly settled him as they raced eighth early while Dr. Schivel, Slow Down Andy, and Hoist the Gold dueled through a quarter-mile in :22.76. Hoist the Gold opened a half-length advantage through :45.86 when Cody's Wish rallied, sweeping by rivals five-wide on his way to the wire with a 3 1/4-lengths victory in a time of 1:34.36.

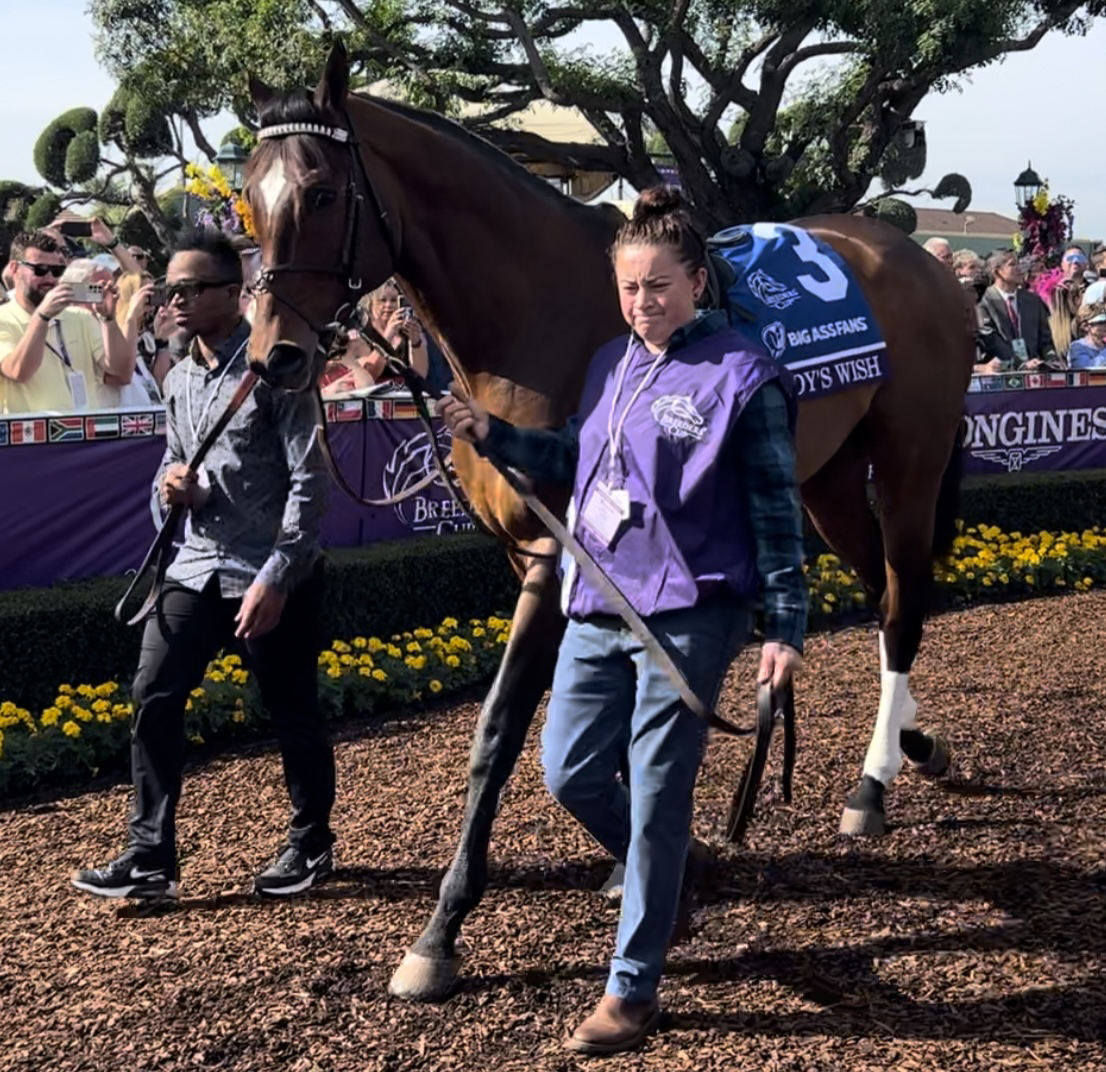
2023 Breeders' Cup Dirt Mile

Cody's Wish was then pointed to the Whitney Stakes at Saratoga Race Course, his first race at the 1 1/8-mile distance in two years, on August 5. With Dorman again in attendance, Cody's Wish broke last in the six-horse field and closed to within four lengths of the lead down the backstretch. Although he moved again on the far turn, it was not enough, according to Mott, who said that "it wasn't the same acceleration that you saw at shorter distances. It was a totally different type of run." Cody's Wish finished third, beaten ten lengths by the Richard Dutrow-trained White Abarrio. Mott said he had no regrets about how Cody's Wish ran, and later in the month Michael Banahan of Godolphin also said that the horse came out of the race well, adding that the distance of the Whitney was "a good opportunity, though we will not do that again." Banahan said that Cody's Wish would be pointed toward the seven-furlong Vosburgh Stakes at Aqueduct on September 30, followed by a defense of his Breeders' Cup Dirt Mile title at Santa Anita Park in November. A win in the Vosburgh would earn Cody's Wish a guaranteed spot in the shorter Breeders' Cup Sprint, although the horse had already earned a spot in the Dirt Mile by winning the Metropolitan Handicap. In the Vosburgh, which was moved ahead one day to October 1 because of heavy rains at Aqueduct, Cody's Wish again broke slowly but rallied three wide around the turn and won by 1 1/2 lengths. After the Vosburgh, Banahan said that Cody's Wish would probably be retired to stud after the Breeders' Cup Dirt Mile.

One month later, Cody's Wish sought to defend his title in the Breeders' Cup Dirt Mile, with Cody Dorman and his family in attendance. Again breaking toward the back of the pack, he advanced and dueled in the closing stages with 2023 Preakness winner National Treasure to cross the line first by a nose. The successful title defense was confirmed after stewards investigated contact between the two horses down the stretch. After the race, Banahan noted that it was "a Hollywood ending to a Hollywood story. You could not have scripted it to end it any better." Mott said he believed Cody's Wish should be on the ballot for Horse of the Year. In December 2023, Cody's Wish was again voted the winner of the Secretariat Vox Populi Award, becoming the first to win the award in consecutive years and joining California Chrome (2014 and 2016) as a two-time award recipient.

For his accomplishments in 2023, Cody's Wish won the Eclipse Award as American Horse of the Year and Champion Older Dirt Male. He received 61% of the first-place votes cast for Horse of the Year, far ahead of runner-up White Abarrio with close to 17%.

== Stud career ==
The day after the 2023 Breeders' Cup Dirt Mile, Darley America announced that Cody's Wish would stand his first breeding season in 2024 at Jonabell Farm in Lexington, Kentucky for a stud fee of $75,000.

The first foal by Cody's Wish, a colt out of multiple grade 2 winner Hotshot Anna, was born on January 6, 2025, at Ramiro Salazar's Phoenix Farm and Racing in Georgetown, Kentucky.

== Statistics ==
Date	Distance	Race	Grade	Track	Odds	Field	Finish	Winning Time	Winning (Losing) Margin	Jockey	Ref
Jun 4, 2021	7 furlongs	Maiden Special Weight		Belmont Park	3.20	8	3	1:22.46	(3 3/4 lengths)	Junior Alvarado	
Jul 28, 2021	1 1/8 miles	Maiden Special Weight		Saratoga	0.65*	9	3	1:49.51	(5 3/4 lengths)	Joel Rosario	
Sep 4, 2021	7 furlongs	Maiden Special Weight		Saratoga	0.90*	7	3	1:22.08	(3 1/4 lengths)	Joel Rosario	
Oct 2, 2021	1 mile	Maiden Special Weight		Churchill Downs	0.30*	6	1 (Note: Cody's Wish ran as an entry with Crump who finished third due to common ownership)	1:33.88	2 lengths	Joel Rosario	
Nov 6, 2021	1 mile	Allowance		Churchill Downs	1.00*	11	1	1:35.06	5 1/4 lengths	Martin Garcia	
Nov 27, 2021	1 mile	Allowance		Churchill Downs	0.90*	8	1	1:34.94	1 length	Joel Rosario	
Mar 12, 2022	1 1/16 miles	Challenger Stakes	III	Tampa Bay Downs	2.10*	7	2	1:43.53	(neck)	Luis Saez	
May 7, 2022	1 mile	Westchester Stakes	III	Belmont Park	0.85*	5	1	1:34.68	5 lengths	Junior Alvarado	
Jul 4, 2022	1 mile	Hanshin Stakes	Listed	Churchill Downs	0.70*	6	1	1:34.10	neck	Junior Alvarado	
Aug 27, 2022	7 furlongs	Forego Stakes	I	Saratoga	8.00	7	1	1:20.95	1 1/4 lengths	Junior Alvarado	
Nov 5, 2022	1 mile	Breeders' Cup Dirt Mile	I	Keeneland	2.16*	9	1	1:35.33	head	Junior Alvarado	
May 6, 2023	7 furlongs	Churchill Downs Stakes	I	Churchill Downs	0.72*	9	1	1:21.17	4 3/4 lengths	Junior Alvarado	
Jun 10, 2023	1 mile	Metropolitan Handicap	I	Belmont Park	0.65*	9	1	1:34.36	3 1/4 lengths	Junior Alvarado	
Aug 5, 2023	1 1/8 miles	Whitney Stakes	I	Saratoga	0.45*	6	3	1:48.45	(10 lengths)	Junior Alvarado	
Oct 1, 2023	7 furlongs	Vosburgh Stakes	II	Aqueduct	0.15*	6	1	1:21.83	1 1/2 lengths	Junior Alvarado	
Nov 4, 2023	1 mile	Breeders' Cup Dirt Mile	I	Santa Anita	0.80*	7	1	1:35.97	nose	Junior Alvarado	

Notes:
An (*) asterisk after the odds means Cody's Wish was the post-time favorite.

== Pedigree ==
Pedigree of Cody's Wish, bay colt, May 3, 2018
Sire Curlin (2004)	Smart Strike (1992)	Mr. Prospector (1970)	Raise A Native (1961)
Sire Curlin (2004)	Smart Strike (1992)	Mr. Prospector (1970)	Gold Digger (1962)
Sire Curlin (2004)	Smart Strike (1992)	Classy 'n Smart (1981)	Smarten (1976)
Sire Curlin (2004)	Smart Strike (1992)	Classy 'n Smart (1981)	No Class (CAN) (1974)
Sire Curlin (2004)	Sherriff's Deputy (1994)	Deputy Minister (CAN) (1979)	Vice Regent (CAN) (1967)
Sire Curlin (2004)	Sherriff's Deputy (1994)	Deputy Minister (CAN) (1979)	Mint Copy (CAN) (1970)
Sire Curlin (2004)	Sherriff's Deputy (1994)	Barbarika (1985)	Bates Motel (1979)
Sire Curlin (2004)	Sherriff's Deputy (1994)	Barbarika (1985)	War Exchange (1972)
Dam Dance Card (2009)	Tapit (2001)	Pulpit (1994)	A.P. Indy (1989)
Dam Dance Card (2009)	Tapit (2001)	Pulpit (1994)	Preach (1989)
Dam Dance Card (2009)	Tapit (2001)	Tap Your Heels (1996)	Unbridled (1987)
Dam Dance Card (2009)	Tapit (2001)	Tap Your Heels (1996)	Ruby Slippers (1982)
Dam Dance Card (2009)	Tempting Note (2001)	Editor's Note (1993)	Forty Niner (1985)
Dam Dance Card (2009)	Tempting Note (2001)	Editor's Note (1993)	Beware of the Cat (1986)
Dam Dance Card (2009)	Tempting Note (2001)	Tempt (1988)	Devil's Bag (1981)
Dam Dance Card (2009)	Tempting Note (2001)	Tempt (1988)	Thinghatab (1980) (family 1-x)
