= Breeders' Cup Dirt Mile =

American Thoroughbred horse race

- The 2008 Breeders' Cup Dirt Mile
- Class: Grade I
- Location: United States
- Inaugurated: 2007
- Race type: Thoroughbred – Flat racing
- Website: breederscup.com/worldchampionships.aspx

Race information
- Distance: One mile (8 furlongs)
- Surface: Dirt
- Track: left-handed
- Qualification: Three-years-old & up
- Weight: Weight for Age
- Purse: US$1,000,000

The Breeders' Cup Dirt Mile is a 1-mile (1.6 km) Weight for Age stakes race for thoroughbred racehorses three years old and up. As its name implies, it is part of the Breeders' Cup World Championships, the de facto year-end championship for North American thoroughbred racing, and is run on a dirt course (either natural dirt or a synthetic surface such as Polytrack). This contrasts with the similar Breeders' Cup Mile, run on grass. All Breeders' Cups so far have been conducted in the United States, with the exception of the 1996 event in Canada.

The race was run for the first time in 2007 during the first day of the expanded Breeders' Cup at that year's host track, Monmouth Park Racetrack in Oceanport, New Jersey. It became a Grade I event in 2009.

Occasionally, various track configurations require minor changes in the distance of the race. The 2007 race at Monmouth Park was held at a distance of 1 mile 70 yards (1673 m) instead of the normal distance of 1-mile (1.6 km). The 2015 Breeders' Cup was held at Keeneland, which does not regularly hold 1–mile dirt races. To get the proper distance, the starting gate was set 70 yards (64 m) in front of the one-mile pole, where the timer would start, and the finishing line was set at the track's alternate finish line at the 1/16 mile pole. Thus the race was slightly longer than a mile for the horses.

== Automatic berths ==
In 2007, the Breeders' Cup has developed the Breeders' Cup Challenge, a series of races in each division that allotted automatic qualifying bids to winners of defined races. Each of the fourteen divisions has multiple qualifying races. Note though that one horse may win multiple challenge races, while other challenge winners will not be entered in the Breeders' Cup for a variety of reasons such as injury or travel considerations.

In the Dirt Mile division, runners are limited to 12 and there are three automatic berths. The 2025 "Win and You're In" races were:

1. the Metropolitan Handicap, a Grade 1 race run in June at Belmont Park in New York
2. the Pat O'Brien Stakes, a Grade 2 race run in August at Del Mar Racetrack in California
3. the Korea Cup, a Grade 2 race run in September at Seoul Race Course in Gwacheon city

== Records ==
Most wins:

- 2 – Goldencents (2013, 2014)
- 2 – Cody's Wish (2022, 2023)

Most wins by a jockey:

- 3 – Joel Rosario (2010, 2020, 2024)
- 3 - Flavien Prat (2017, 2025, 2026)

Most wins by a trainer:

- 2 – Jerry Hollendorfer (2010, 2017)
- 2 – Todd A. Pletcher (2015, 2021)
- 2 – William I. Mott (2022, 2023)
- 2 - Brad H. Cox (2020, 2026)

Most wins by an owner:

- 2 – W. C. Racing (2013, 2014)
- 2 – WinStar Farm (2017, 2021)
- 2 – Godolphin (2022, 2023)

== Winners ==
Year	Winner	Age	Jockey	Trainer	Owner	Time	Purse	Grade
2026	Further Ado	3	Flavien Prat	Brad H. Cox	Spendthrift Farm	1:34.50	$1,000,000	I
2025	Nysos	4	Flavien Prat	Bob Baffert	Baoma Corp.	1:34.71	$1,000,000	I
2024	Full Serrano (ARG)	5	Joel Rosario	John W. Sadler	Stephanie Kosta, Pete Hronis & Hronis Racing	1:35.48	$1,000,000	I
2023	Cody's Wish	5	Junior Alvarado	William I. Mott	Godolphin	1:35.97	$1,000,000	I
2022	Cody's Wish	4	Junior Alvarado	William I. Mott	Godolphin	1:35.33	$1,000,000	I
2021	Life Is Good	3	Irad Ortiz Jr.	Todd A. Pletcher	WinStar Farm & China Horse Club	1:34.12	$1,000,000	I
2020	Knicks Go	4	Joel Rosario	Brad H. Cox	Korea Racing Authority	1:33.85	$1,000,000	I
2019	Spun to Run	3	Irad Ortiz Jr.	Juan Carlos Guerrero	Robert P. Donaldson	1:36.58	$1,000,000	I
2018	City of Light	4	Javier Castellano	Michael W. McCarthy	William K. & Suzanne Warren Jr.	1:33.83	$1,000,000	I
2017	Battle Of Midway	3	Flavien Prat	Jerry Hollendorfer	Don Alberto Stable & WinStar Farm	1:35.20	$1,000,000	I
2016	Tamarkuz	6	Mike Smith	Kiaran McLaughlin	Shadwell Stable	1:35.72	$1,000,000	I
2015	Liam's Map	4	Javier Castellano	Todd A. Pletcher	Teresa Viola Racing Stables	1:34.54	$1,000,000	I
2014	Goldencents	4	Rafael Bejarano	Leandro Mora	W. C. Racing Inc.	1:35.19	$1,000,000	I
2013	Goldencents	3	Rafael Bejarano	Doug O'Neill	W. C. Racing Inc., RAP Racing & Dave Kenney	1:35.12	$1,000,000	I
2012	Tapizar	4	Corey Nakatani	Steven M. Asmussen	Winchell Thoroughbreds	1:35.34	$1,000,000	I
2011	Caleb's Posse	3	Rajiv Maragh	Donnie K. Von Hemel	McNeil Stables & Cheyenne Stables	1:34.59	$1,000,000	I
2010	Dakota Phone	5	Joel Rosario	Jerry Hollendorfer	Halo Farms, Jerry Hollendorfer, John Carver & George Todaro	1:35.29	$1,000,000	I
2009	Furthest Land	4	Julien Leparoux	Michael J. Maker	Kenneth & Sarah Ramsey	1:35.50	$1,000,000	I
2008	Albertus Maximus	4	Garrett Gomez	Vladimir Cerin	Brandon Chase & Marianne Chase	1:33.41	$1,000,000	
2007	Corinthian	4	Kent Desormeaux	James A. Jerkens	Centennial Farms	1:39.06	$1,000,000	

== See also ==
- Breeders' Cup Dirt Mile "top three finishers" and starters
- American thoroughbred racing top attended events
