= Battle of Midway (horse) =

American-bred Thoroughbred racehorse

- Sire: Smart Strike
- Grandsire: Mr. Prospector
- Dam: Rigoletta
- Damsire: Concerto
- Sex: Colt
- Foaled: January 30, 2014
- Died: February 23, 2019
- Country: United States
- Colour: Bay
- Breeder: Thor-Bred Stables
- Owner: Fox Hill Farms; Don Alberto Stable and WinStar Farm (2017-9)
- Trainer: Jerry Hollendorfer
- Record: 16: 8-4-2
- Earnings: $1,589,049

Major wins
- Affirmed Stakes (2017); Shared Belief Stakes (2017); Native Diver Stakes (2018); San Pasqual Stakes (2019) Breeders' Cup wins: Breeders' Cup Dirt Mile (2017) Triple Crown highlights: 3rd Kentucky Derby (2017)
- Last updated on February 23, 2019

Battle of Midway (January 30, 2014 – February 23, 2019) was an American Thoroughbred racehorse best known for his upset victory in the 2017 Breeders' Cup Dirt Mile. He also finished third in the 2017 Kentucky Derby before winning the Affirmed Stakes and Shared Belief Stakes that year. Briefly retired to stud in 2018, he proved sub-fertile and was returned to racing that summer. In his second career, he won several stakes races including the Native Diver and San Pasqual. He was euthanized on February 23, 2019, after suffering a severe fracture to the hind pastern while in training for his next race.

== Background ==
Battle of Midway was a bay horse bred by Thor-Bred Stables, owned by Erik and Pavla Nygaard, and was foaled at Chesapeake Farm in Kentucky. His sire Smart Strike was a Canadian Hall Of Fame racehorse and notable sire who also sired Preakness Stakes winner Lookin at Lucky, Hall of Fame inductee Curlin, and Breeders Cup Turf winner English Channel. Battle of Midway's dam Rigoletta won the G1 Oak Leaf Stakes as a two-year-old. While in foal with Battle of Midway, Rigoletta developed a foot abscess that led to a serious coffin bone infection. Rigoletta eventually recovered and Battle of Midway thrived, developing a reputation as "the biggest and the strongest" foal at the farm.

He was bought at the 2015 Fasig-Tipton New York Saratoga Sale for $410,000 on behalf of Rick Porter's Fox Hill Farm. Porter named the colt after the Battle of Midway in World War II. Battle of Midway was privately sold in 2017 to Don Alberto Stable and WinStar Farm after his second-place finish in the Santa Anita Derby. He was trained by Jerry Hollendorfer.

== Racing career ==
=== 2017: three-year-old season ===
Battle of Midway was unraced as a two-year-old, instead making his debut in a six furlong maiden special weight race for three-year-olds at Santa Anita Park on January 21, 2017. Sent off as the 7-2 third choice, he dueled with Bronze Age before that rival weakened in the stretch run. Battle of Midway then drew away to a 3 1/4 length victory under jockey Drayden van Dyke. In his next race, Battle of Midway stepped up sharply in class for the Grade 2 San Vicente Stakes, also at Santa Anita, ultimately finishing third to Iliad.

With that loss, he made his next start in an allowance optional claiming race at Santa Anita on March 9. Similar to the San Vicente, he started fifth and was almost three lengths behind at the end of the first quarter-mile while being carried wide around the first turn. He rated in fourth down the backstretch, then started his move on the final turn, again carried wide. He took over the lead at the head of the stretch, then held of a late run by Reach the World to win by a neck.

Battle of Midway returned to stakes company in the Grade I Santa Anita Derby on April 8, part of a field of thirteen that included stakes winners Iliad (San Vincente), Gormley (FrontRunner) and Royal Mo (Robert B. Lewis). Battle of Midway broke well and battled for the lead with American Anthem and Royal Mo. Around the far turn, American Anthem faded while Battle of Midway moved to the lead. Gormley started closing ground from further pack and gradually moved by Battle of Midway, who lost by half a length.

The second-place finish gave the colt 40 points on the Road to the Kentucky Derby, enough to qualify for the race. He trained well at Santa Anita in the weeks leading up to the 2017 Kentucky Derby, then was shipped to Churchill Downs shortly before the race. The highly competitive field of 20 included Always Dreaming (Florida Derby), Thunder Snow (UAE Derby), Girvin (Louisiana Derby), Gunnevera, Classic Empire (Breeders' Cup Juvenile), Tapwrit, Irish War Cry (Wood Memorial) and Gormley. Battle of Midway was widely dismissed at odds of 40–1. On a muddy track, Battle of Midway broke well and avoided traffic problems that took out several leading contenders. He rated behind State of Honor and Always Dreaming with Irish War Cry to his outside. Moving around the final turn, Always Dreaming took control of the race while Battle of Midway also made his move while being pushed wide. In the stretch, Lookin at Lee made a late run to move into second, with Battle of Midway finishing third.

His connections opted to skip the rest of the Triple Crown series, instead returning Battle of Midway to California and giving him some time off. On June 24, he entered the Affirmed Stakes as the 1-9 favorite. He broke sharply and took the lead by half a length. Around the turn, B Squared moved alongside but Battle of Midway powered back and opened up to win by 4 1/4 lengths. "We didn't go super fast the first part," said jockey Flavien Prat. "I think it's better (for him) to run at a target and a good pace, but we were comfortable on the lead and he did a great job."

Battle of Midway was then shipped across the country for the Haskell Invitational Stakes at Monmouth Park on July 30. He hesitated at the break and brushed against the gate, then rushed up to the lead with Irish War Cry and Timeline. However, he flattened off in the stretch and finished sixth behind Girvin.

He made his debut at Del Mar in his next start, the Shared Belief Stakes on August 26. Under the allowance conditions of the race, he carried top weight of 124 pounds along with Gormley and Cistron. Wearing blinkers for the first time, he stalked the early pace set by Cistron and Gato Del Oro. Moving around the far turn, he made a strong move to take the lead, then continued to draw away down the stretch to win by 6 1/4 lengths.

In his next start, he headed to Remington Park in Oklahoma for the Oklahoma Derby on September 24. Battle of Midway started in between horses and was "pin balled around", dropping back to fifth. He made a huge move turning into the stretch to take the lead but tired and was passed by Untrapped to finish second.

Despite the loss, Battle of Midway made his fourth attempt at a Grade 1 in the Breeders Cup Dirt Mile on November 3. He faced a deep field that included three horses who were already Grade I winners – H Allen Jerkins winner Practical Joke, Met Mile winner Mor Spirit, and Gold Cup Winner Cupid. Multiple graded stakes winners Accelerate and Sharp Azteca were also given serious consideration by the bettors. The odds on Battle of Midway drifted out from 10–1 on the morning line to 14–1 at post time.

At the start, Battle of Midway settled a few lengths behind the early leaders while moving four wide around the first turn. Jockey Flavien Prat noted that the colt was relaxed moving down the backstretch and kept him out of traffic problems, moving five wide around the final turn. He started his closing drive on the turn and by the top of the stretch had moved into second behind pacesetter Sharp Azteca. Battle of Midway had the momentum but Sharp Azteca continued to fight back. Battle of Midway also dug in and prevailed by half a length at the wire.

He finished the year with a record of five wins, two seconds and two thirds from 10 starts.

=== 2018: Brief retirement and four-year-old season ===
Battle of Midway was retired to stud at WinStar Farm for the 2018 breeding season for a fee of $20,000 live foal. Despite covering 60 (or 61 depending on the source) mares during the 2018 season, he was only able to get five of them in foal because he is missing a gene that impacts his sperm's ability to fertilize eggs. Battle of Midway's owners elected to take a subfertility insurance payout and put him back into race training, sending him temporarily to the barn of Rodolphe Brisset at Keeneland. He eventually returned to the care of Jerry Hollendorfer, his original trainer.

Battle of Midway returned to racing in the Grade II Pat O'Brien Stakes at Del Mar on August 25 over a distance of seven furlongs. He bobbled at the start and then settled into fourth place. He closed ground late to finish second, but was well beaten by heavy favorite Catalina Cruiser. Based on that performance, Battle of Midway went off as the even money favorite in the Kelso Handicap at Belmont Park on September 22. Starting from post position one, he rated in third place and then swung wide turning into the stretch, bumping lightly with another horse. He lacked his normal closing kick and finished fifth.

Hollendorfer then dropped Battle of Midway down in class by entering him in the listed Comma to the Top Stakes at Santa Anita on October 28 at his best distance of one mile. His jockey, Flavien Prat, placed him on the outside of the pack, then released him with two furlongs remaining. Battle of Midway drew away to win by 4 1/2 lengths. "He's got a lot of natural speed, and he settled very nice," said Prat. "He's a very classy horse, and the two turns probably helped him today."

On November 25, Battle of Midway was entered in the Native Diver Stakes at Del Mar. In a field of three, Isotherm fought his rider and eventually dropped out of competition, turning the contest into a match race between Battle of Midway and Dabster. The two battled around the track, never separated by more than half a length, with Dabster taking the lead briefly after half a mile. Battle of Midway responded to the challenge and prevailed by a neck. Hollendorfer remarked, "[Dabster's jockey] rode a good tactic trying to beat us, but he showed some guts. Sometimes they have to. In the end we were a neck ahead, and that worked out for us."

Battle of Midway made his final start of 2018 in the San Antonio Stakes on December 26, opening day of Santa Anita's winter spring meet. He and Dabster once again vied for the early lead and were still in command at the top of stretch before being passed by Gift Box. Battle of Midway held on for second, 3/4 lengths clear of Dabster. He finished the season with a record of two wins and two seconds from five starts.

=== 2019: Five-year-old season ===
Battle of Midway kicked off his 2019 campaign with a win in the San Pasqual Stakes on February 2 over a distance of 1 1/8 miles. Breaking from the outside post in a field of five, he rated behind his main rival, Grade I winner McKinzie. As they exited the backstretch, McKinzie started his move and joined early pace setter Giant Expectations. Battle of Midway, under mild urging from Flavien Prat, followed suit and the three horses dueled around the final turn. At the head of the stretch, Giant Expectations gave way and Battle of Midway moved to the lead. McKinzie continued to battle down the stretch with Battle of Midway prevailing by half a length. "I think the key was being outside," said Prat. "I don't think either horse likes to get pressure inside, and I was able to stay just outside of McKinzie the whole way. My horse likes to play around a little when he makes the lead, but he still finished good."

Seven days later, Battle of Midway became a father as his first foal (sired before he went back from breeding to racing in 2018) was born, a filly out of La Bohème, by Giant's Causeway.

On February 23, Battle of Midway shattered his pastern in a hind leg during training for an upcoming race. The injuries were so severe that he had to be euthanized. At the time of Battle of Midway's death, three of his five foals had been born, with the fourth coming one day later.

== Pedigree ==
Pedigree of Battle of Midway, bay colt, foaled January 30, 2014
Sire Smart Strike bay 1992	Mr. Prospector b. 1970	Raise a Native ch. 1961	Native Dancer
Sire Smart Strike bay 1992	Mr. Prospector b. 1970	Raise a Native ch. 1961	Raise You
Sire Smart Strike bay 1992	Mr. Prospector b. 1970	Gold Digger b. 1962	Nashua
Sire Smart Strike bay 1992	Mr. Prospector b. 1970	Gold Digger b. 1962	Sequence
Sire Smart Strike bay 1992	Classy 'n Smart b. 1981	Smarten dkb/br. 1976	Cyane
Sire Smart Strike bay 1992	Classy 'n Smart b. 1981	Smarten dkb/br. 1976	Smartaire
Sire Smart Strike bay 1992	Classy 'n Smart b. 1981	No Class b. 1974	Nodouble
Sire Smart Strike bay 1992	Classy 'n Smart b. 1981	No Class b. 1974	Classy Quillo
Dam Rigoletta bay 2008	Concerto ch. 1994	Chief's Crown b. 1982	Danzig
Dam Rigoletta bay 2008	Concerto ch. 1994	Chief's Crown b. 1982	Six Crowns
Dam Rigoletta bay 2008	Concerto ch. 1994	Undeniably ch. 1987	In Reality
Dam Rigoletta bay 2008	Concerto ch. 1994	Undeniably ch. 1987	Past Forgetting
Dam Rigoletta bay 2008	Almost Aprom Queen dkb/br. 2000	Montbrook dkb/br. 1990	Buckaroo
Dam Rigoletta bay 2008	Almost Aprom Queen dkb/br. 2000	Montbrook dkb/br. 1990	Secret Papers
Dam Rigoletta bay 2008	Almost Aprom Queen dkb/br. 2000	Romantic Dinner dkb/br. 1989	Who's For Dinner
Dam Rigoletta bay 2008	Almost Aprom Queen dkb/br. 2000	Romantic Dinner dkb/br. 1989	Victorious Meg (Family 10-a)
