= Further Ado (horse) =

American racehorse

- Sire: Gun Runner
- Grandsire: Candy Ride (ARG)
- Dam: Sky Dreamer
- Damsire: Sky Mesa
- Sex: Colt
- Foaled: March 15, 2023
- Country: United States
- Color: Chestnut
- Breeder: John C. Oxley
- Owner: Spendthrift Farm
- Trainer: Brad H. Cox
- Record: 11: 5 - 2 - 1
- Earnings: US$1,661,958

Major wins
- Kentucky Jockey Club Stakes (2025); Blue Grass Stakes (2026); Matt Winn Stakes (2026); Breeders' Cup wins: Breeders' Cup Dirt Mile (2026)
- Last updated on October 7, 2026

Further Ado (foaled March 15, 2023) is a Grade I winning American Thoroughbred racehorse who won the 2026 Blue Grass Stakes and Breeders' Cup Dirt Mile at Keeneland.

== Background ==
Further Ado is a chestnut colt who was bred in Kentucky by John Oxley out of the Grade III-placed Sky Mesa mare Sky Dreamer. John Oxley had bought Sky Mesa as a yearling at the 2001 Keeneland's September Yearling Sale. As a two-year-old Sky Mesa won the 2002 Grade I Hopeful Stakes at Saratoga Racetrack. The dam, Sky Dreamer (foaled January 23, 2009) was also bred by John Oxley and ran all of races in Woodbine except for the one start in the US, at Arlington Park in the Grade III Arlington Oaks where she finished second to La Tia.

Further Ado was initially purchased by George Mellon in the fall of 2024 at Keeneland's September Yearling Sale for $275,000. He in turn sent the juvenile to the 2025 Ocala Breeders' Sales Spring Sale of Two-Year-Olds in Training on consignment to Six K's Training & Sales who sold him to Spendthrift Farm for US$550,000.

Further Ado's sire is Gun Runner who stands at Three Chimneys Farm for US$250,000 in 2026.

Further Ado is trained by US Champion trainer Brad H. Cox.

== Statistics ==
Date	Distance	Race	Grade	Track	Odds	Field	Finish	Winning Time	Winning (Losing) Margin	Jockey	Ref
2025 – Two-year-old season
Jul 26, 2025	6 furlongs	Maiden Special Weight		Saratoga	2.45	8	5	1:11.87	(3 1/2 lengths)	Irad Ortiz Jr.	
Aug 30, 2025	7 furlongs	Maiden Special Weight		Saratoga	4.60	8	3	1:23.63	(6 1/4 lengths)	Luan Machado	
Oct 10, 2025	1 1/16 miles	Maiden Special Weight		Keeneland	2.24	7	1	1:43.52	20 lengths	Irad Ortiz Jr.	
Dec 6, 2025	1 1/16 miles	Kentucky Jockey Club Stakes	II	Churchill Downs	0.71*	7	1	1:43.33	1 3/4 lengths	Irad Ortiz Jr.	
2026 – Three-year-old season
Mar 7, 2026	1 1/16 miles	Tampa Bay Derby	III	Tampa Bay Downs	2.00	9	2	1:43.23	(3/4 length)	Irad Ortiz Jr.	
Apr 6, 2026	1 1/8 miles	Blue Grass Stakes	I	Keeneland	0.85*	7	1	1:49.58	11 lengths	Irad Ortiz Jr.	
May 2, 2026	1 1/4 miles	Kentucky Derby	I	Churchill Downs	5.05*	18	11	2:02.27	(7 3/4 lengths)	John R. Velazquez	
Jun 7, 2026	1 1/16 miles	Matt Winn Stakes	III	Churchill Downs	0.69*	8	1	1:41.26	2 lengths	Irad Ortiz Jr.	
Jul 18, 2026	1 1/8 miles	Haskell Stakes	I	Monmouth Park	1.10*	7	5	1:50.18	(5 3/4 lengths)	Irad Ortiz Jr.	
Sep 18, 2026	1 1/8 miles	Pennsylvania Derby	I	Parx	2.00*	11	2	1:49.10	(1/2 lengths)	Flavien Prat	
Oct 31, 2026	1 mile	Breeders' Cup Dirt Mile	I	Keeneland	1.01*	10	1	1:34.50	nose	Flavien Prat	

Notes:
An (*) asterisk after the odds means Further Ado was the post-time favourite.

== Pedigree ==
Pedigree of Further Ado, chestnut, foaled March 15, 2023
Sire Gun Runner (2013)	Candy Ride (ARG) (1999)	Ride the Rails (1991)	Cryptoclearance (1984)
Sire Gun Runner (2013)	Candy Ride (ARG) (1999)	Ride the Rails (1991)	Herbalesian (1969)
Sire Gun Runner (2013)	Candy Ride (ARG) (1999)	Candy Girl (ARG) (1990)	Candy Stripes (1982)
Sire Gun Runner (2013)	Candy Ride (ARG) (1999)	Candy Girl (ARG) (1990)	City Girl (ARG) (1982)
Sire Gun Runner (2013)	Quiet Giant (2007)	Giant's Causeway (1997)	Storm Cat (1983)
Sire Gun Runner (2013)	Quiet Giant (2007)	Giant's Causeway (1997)	Mariah's Storm (1991)
Sire Gun Runner (2013)	Quiet Giant (2007)	Quiet Dance (1993)	Quiet American (1986)
Sire Gun Runner (2013)	Quiet Giant (2007)	Quiet Dance (1993)	Misty Dancer (1988)
Dam Sky Dreamer (2009)	Sky Mesa (2000)	Pulpit (1994)	A.P. Indy (1989)
Dam Sky Dreamer (2009)	Sky Mesa (2000)	Pulpit (1994)	Preach (1989)
Dam Sky Dreamer (2009)	Sky Mesa (2000)	Caress (1991)	Storm Cat (1983)
Dam Sky Dreamer (2009)	Sky Mesa (2000)	Caress (1991)	La Affirmed (1983)
Dam Sky Dreamer (2009)	To Dream About (2004)	Monarchos (1998)	Maria's Mon (1993)
Dam Sky Dreamer (2009)	To Dream About (2004)	Monarchos (1998)	Regal Band (1987)
Dam Sky Dreamer (2009)	To Dream About (2004)	Beautiful Pleasure (1995)	Maudlin (1978)
Dam Sky Dreamer (2009)	To Dream About (2004)	Beautiful Pleasure (1995)	Beautiful Bid (1984) (family 19-b)
