= Club Hípico de Santiago =

Horse racing track in Santiago, Chile

Coordinates: 33°27′51″S 70°40′6″W

- Interactive map of Club Hípico de Santiago
- Location: Santiago, Chile
- Date opened: 1870
- Race type: Thoroughbred
- Notable races: Premio El Ensayo (Chi-G1); Chilean Oaks (Chi-G1); Polla de Potrillos (Chi-G1); Polla de Potrancas (Chi-G1)

Club Hípico de Santiago is a thoroughbred horse race track in Santiago, Chile.

== History ==
The Club Hípico de Santiago, opened in 1870, is Chile's oldest racetrack and home to South America's oldest stakes race, the Clásico El Ensayo. It is one of Chile's three main tracks, the others being Hipodromo Chile and Valparaiso Sporting Club.

== Physical attributes ==
Club Hípico features a wide right-handed turf course, approximately 2400 m (12 furlongs) long, and is landscaped with gardens, fountains and ponds.

== Concerts ==
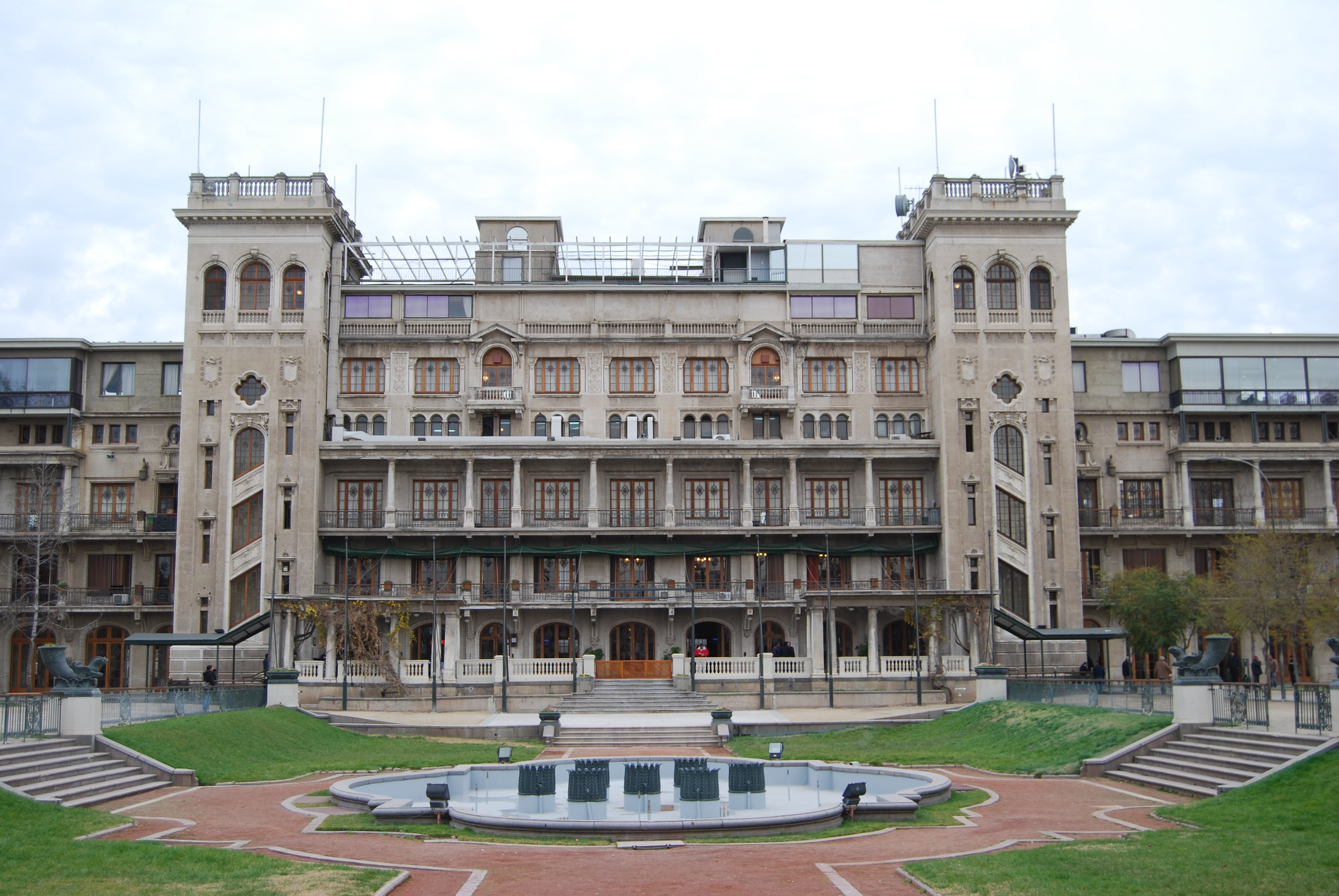
Racecourse façade

Concerts at Club Hípico de Santiago
Date	Artist	Tour	Attendance
April 15, 2007	Festival	Vive Latino	30,079
9 March 2008	Iron Maiden	Somewhere Back in Time World Tour	65,000
January 11, 2009	Festival	La Cumbre Del Rock Chileno	—
May 20, 2009	Jonas Brothers	Jonas Brothers World Tour 2009	33,376
October 11, 2009	Los Fabulosos Cadillacs	Satanico Pop Tour	50,000
October 15, 2009	Depeche Mode	Tour of the Universe (tour)	50,280
January 26, 2010	Metallica	World Magnetic Tour	55,080
October 9, 2010	Linkin Park	A Thousand Suns World Tour	45,000
April 27, 2022	Metallica	Metallica 2021–2022 Tour	62,681

== Racing ==
Live racing takes place every Friday, every other Monday and on some Sundays. Race days are extremely long by international standards, usually featuring around 18 races per card.

=== 2007 Major Stakes Schedule ===
Date	Race (Premio ...)	Distance	Age/Sex	Grade
Fri Feb 16	Verano - Arturo Cousino	2000 m	3+	G2
Fri May 4	Carlos Campino	1800 m	3+	G2
Sun May 20	Club Hípico de Santiago - Falabella	2000 m	3+	G1
Fri Jun 22	Alberto Vial Infante	1600 m	2M	G1
Fri Jun 29	Francisco Baeza	2000 m	3+ F&M	G2
Fri Jun 29	Arturo Lyon Pena	1600 m	2F	G1
Fri Aug 10	Criadores	1600 m	3M	G2
Fri Aug 10	Criadores - Dorana	1600 m	3F	G2
Fri Aug 24	Copa de Oro	2000 m	3+	G2
Fri Aug 31	Polla de Potrillos	1700 m	3M	G1
Fri Sep 7	Polla de Potrancas	1700 m	3F	G1
Fri Oct 5	Nacional Ricardo Lyon	2000 m	3yo	G1
Sun Nov 4	El Ensayo	2400 m	3yo	G1
Sun Dec 2	Las Oaks	2000 m	3F	G1
Mon Dec 10	Velocidad	1000 m	3+	G2
Fri Dec 28	Gran Clásico Coronación - Entel	2000 m	3+	G2
