= 2023 Road to the Kentucky Derby =

Thoroughbred horse racing series

The 2023 Road to the Kentucky Derby is a series of races through which horses qualified for the 2023 Kentucky Derby, which was held on May 6. The field for the Derby was limited to 20 horses, with up to four 'also eligibles' in case of a late withdrawal from the field. There were three separate paths for horses to take to qualify for the Derby: the main Road consisting of races in North America (plus one in Dubai), the Japan Road consisting of four races in Japan, and the European road consisting of seven races in England, Ireland and France. The top five finishers in the specified races received points, with higher points awarded in the major prep races in March and April. Earnings in non-restricted stakes races acted as a tie breaker.

For 2023, the main Road to the Kentucky Derby resembled the 2022 Road to the Kentucky Derby, consisting of 37 races, one more event than in 2021, with 21 races for the Kentucky Derby Prep Season and 16 races for the Kentucky Derby Championship Season with the following changes: (Note: See the following list for details)

- Points were now awarded to the top-five finishing positions in qualifying races, and the significance of the G1 Breeders' Cup Juvenile and select races traditionally run in late January have been increased. Prep season races now awarded points on a sliding scale of 10-4-3-2-1.
- Points awarded in the Breeders' Cup Juvenile were increased from 20-8-4-2 to 30-12-9-6-3 in order to differentiate what has historically been a high-quality grade 1 race from others during the prep season.
- Select prep season races that traditionally serve as steppingstones to the Kentucky Derby Championship Series have been elevated from 10-4-2-1 to 20-8-6-4-2. These include G3 Lecomte Stakes, G3 Southwest Stakes, G3 Withers Stakes, G3 Holy Bull Stakes, G3 Robert B. Lewis Stakes, G3 Sam F. Davis Stakes and the Listed John Battaglia Memorial Stakes.

== Standings ==
The following table shows the points earned in the eligible races for the main series.

Rank	Horse	Points	Earnings (Note: Earnings from non-restricted stakes prior to the running of the Kentucky Derby serve as a tie-breaker.)	Trainer	Owner	Ref
1—scratched (Note: Derby favorite Forte was scratched on the day of the event after the regulatory veterinarian had concerns relating to a mending foot bruise in his right front leg)	Forte	190	$2,359,730	Todd A. Pletcher	Repole Stable & St. Elias Stable	
2—scratched (Note: Practical Move was drawn into the event but showed an elevated temperature on Thursday, May 4th and trainer Tim Yakteen indicated that he plans to scratch the entry)	Practical Move	160	$822,000	Tim Yakteen	Pierre Jean Amestoy Jr., Leslie A. Amestoy & Roger K. Bersley	
3	Angel of Empire	154	$1,026,375	Brad H. Cox	Albaugh Family Stables	
4	Tapit Trice	150	$783,500	Todd A. Pletcher	Whisper Hill Farm & Gainesway Stable	
5	Two Phil's	123	$643,850	Larry Rivelli	Patricia's Hope & Phillip Sagan	
6—scratched	Lord Miles (Note: Lord Miles was scratched by order of the Kentucky Horse Racing Commission, which announced that all horses trained by Saffie Joseph Jr. would be scratched until further notice after two of them collapsed and died following races run at Churchill on April 29 and May 2. The scratch of Lord Miles allowed Japanese horse Mandarin Hero to draw in to the race.)	105	$427,100	Saffie Joseph Jr.	Vegso Racing Stable	
7	Derma Sotogake (JPN)	100	$1,112,319	Hidetaka Otonashi	Hiroyuki Asanuma	
8	Kingsbarns	100	$600,000	Todd A. Pletcher	Spendthrift Farm	
9	Raise Cain	64	$232,500	Ben Colbrook	Andrew N. Warren & Rania Warren	
10	Rocket Can	60	$284,025	William I. Mott	Frank Fletcher Racing	
11	Hit Show	60	$277,500	Brad H. Cox	Gary & Mary West	
12	Confidence Game	57	$610,480	J. Keith Desormeaux	Don't Tell My Wife Stables	
13	Verifying	54	$369,750	Brad H. Cox	Jonathan Poulin, Westerberg, Derrick Smith, Mrs. John Magnier & Michael Tabor	
14	Sun Thunder	54	$181,500	Kenneth G. McPeek	R.T Racing Stable & Cypress Creek Equine	
euthanized	Wild On Ice (Note: Originally Wild On Ice was not nominated for the Triple Crown events, but after his victory in the Sunland Derby connections paid the late nomination fee and hence, he is eligible for the Kentucky Derby.)	50	$366,400	Joel Marr	Frank Sumpter	
15	Mage	50	$205,200	Gustavo Delgado	OGMA Investments, Ramiro Restrepo, Sterling Racing & CMNWLTH	
bypassing	Blazing Sevens	46	$507,600	Chad C. Brown	Rodeo Creek Racing	
16	Disarm	46	$237,500	Steven M. Asmussen	Winchell Thoroughbreds	
17	Reincarnate	45	$263,250	Tim Yakteen	SF Racing, Starlight Racing, Madaket Stables, Robert E. Masterson, Stonestreet Stables, Jay A. Schoenfarber, Waves Edge Capital & Catherine Donovan	
18	Jace's Road	45	$200,350	Brad H. Cox	West Point Thoroughbreds & Albaugh Family Stables	
19—scratched (Note: On the day before the Derby, John Shirreffs scratched Skinner after that horse developed a temperature.)	Skinner	45	$174,500	John Shirreffs	C R K Stable	
20—scratched (Note: Continuar was scratched by trainer Yoshito Yahagi who regarded that the horse did not reach peak fitness for the race)	Continuar (JPN) (Note: Originally, Continuar (JPN) qualified and was drawn into the starting field after accepting an invitation to compete in the Kentucky Derby for accruing 40 points in the Japan Road to the Kentucky Derby series.)	30	$289,954	Yoshito Yahagi	Lion Race Horse	
21	Cyclone Mischief (Note: Cyclone Mischief was drawn as an also eligible into the event, but with the scratching of Practical Move he was moved into the starting field.)	45	$137,525	Dale L. Romans	Albaugh Family Stables & Castleton Lyons	
22	Mandarin Hero (JPN) (Note: Mandarin Hero (JPN) was drawn as an also eligible into the event, but with the scratching of Lord Miles he was moved into the starting field.)	40	$339,041	Terunobu Fujita	Hiroaki Arai	
bypassing (Note: Connections of Major Dude did not enter the horse for the event, instead they entered him in the G2 American Turf Stakes on the same racecard as the Kentucky Derby)	Major Dude	40	$401,595	Todd A. Pletcher	Spendthrift Farm	
23	King Russell (Note: Originally King Russell was not nominated for the Triple Crown events, but connections paid the late nomination fee and hence, he is eligible for the Kentucky Derby King Russell was drawn as an also eligible into the event, but with the scratching of Continuar (JPN) he was moved into the starting field.)	40	$227,500	Ron Moquett	Brereton C. Jones & Naber Racing	
bypassing	Dura Erede (JPN)	40	$774,897	Manabu Ikezoe	Three H Racing	
bypassing	Arctic Arrogance	36	$180,000	Linda L. Rice	Chester Broman Sr. & Mary Broman	
bypassing	Red Route One	33	$417,125	Steven M. Asmussen	Winchell Thoroughbreds	
bypassing	Instant Coffee	32	$395,065	Brad H. Cox	Gold Square	
bypassing	Funtastic Again	30	$150,116	Wesley A. Ward	Three Chimneys Farm	
bypassing	Dreamlike	30	$75,000	Todd A. Pletcher	Repole Stable & St. Elias Stable	
bypassing	Classic Car Wash	26	$100,000	Mark E. Casse	Gary Barber	
bypassing	General Banker	24	$84,000	James W. Ferraro	Seacoast Thoroughbreds of New England	
bypassing	Perriere (JPN)	20	$332,805	Yoichi Kuroiwa	Yuji Hasegawa	
bypassing	National Treasure	20	$297,000	Tim Yakteen	SF Racing, Starlight Racing, Madaket Stables, Robert E. Masterson, Stonestreet Stables, Jay A. Schoenfarber, Waves Edge Capital & Catherine Donovan	
bypassing	First Mission	20	$232,500	Brad H. Cox	Godolphin	
bypassing	Congruent	20	$221,585	Antonio Sano	Tami Bobo & Lugamo Racing Stable	
bypassing	Low Expectations	20	$130,680	Antonio Garcia	Reddam Racing	
injured	Litigate	20	$120,000	Todd A. Pletcher	Centennial Farms	
bypassing	Slip Mahoney	20	$82,500	Brad H. Cox	Gold Square	
bypassing	Geaux Rocket Ride	20	$80,000	Richard E. Mandella	Pin Oak Stud	
bypassing	Mr. Ripple	20	$46,500	Saffie Joseph Jr.	Legacy Racing	
bypassing	Shopper's Revenge	20	$40,000	Steven M. Asmussen	Whisper Hill Farm & Three Chimneys Farm	
bypassing	Wadsworth	20	$34,000	Brad H. Cox	Godolphin	
bypassing	Classic Legacy	19	$45,000	William I. Mott	Bruce Lunsford	
bypassing	Curly Jack	17	$348,120	Thomas M. Amoss	Michael McLoughlin	
bypassing	One in Vermillion	15	$178,143	Esteban Martinez	Jonathan Kalman	
bypassing	Henry Q	15	$119,400	Todd Fincher	The Del Mar Group	
bypassing	Fort Bragg	15	$59,900	Tim Yakteen	SF Racing, Starlight Racing, Madaket Stables, Robert E. Masterson, Stonestreet Stables, Jay A. Schoenfarber, Waves Edge Capital & Catherine Donovan	
bypassing	Shadow Dragon	13	$77,520	William I. Mott	Peachtree Stable	
bypassing	Denington	12	$61,860	Kenneth G. McPeek	Fern Circle Stables & Magdalena Racing	
not nominated	How Did He Do That	11	$100,100	Steven M. Asmussen	J. Kirk & Judy Robison	
bypassing	Victory Formation	10	$156,750	Brad H. Cox	Spendthrift Farm & Frank Fletcher Racing Operations Inc.	
bypassing	Dubyuhnell	10	$137,500	Danny Gargan	West Paces Racing & Stonestreet Stables	
bypassing	Go Soldier Go	10	$132,062	Fawzi Abdulla	Victorious	
injured	Hejazi	10	$118,500	Tim Yakteen	Zedan Racing Stables	
bypassing	Lugan Knight	10	$83,625	Michael J. McCarthy	BG Stables	
bypassing	Chase the Chaos	10	$81,500	Ed Moger Jr.	Adam Ference & Bill Dory	
bypassing	Classic Catch	10	$30,000	Todd A. Pletcher	Whisper Hill Farm	
bypassing	Tapit's Conquest	10	$26,000	Brad H. Cox	Robert V. LaPenta, e Five Racing Thor. & Madaket Stables	
not nominated	Airtime	10	$18,750	Robertino Diodoro	Randy Howg	
injured	Eyeing Clover	10	$18,000	Brad H. Cox	Ten Strike Racing, Michael E. Kisber & Colin Reed	
bypassing	Prairie Hawk	10	$17,500	Saffie Joseph Jr.	Peachtree Stable & WinStar Farm	
not nominated	Maker's Candy	10	$14,400	Michael J. Maker	Paradise Farms, David Staudacher, Maxis Stable & Gata Racing Stable	
bypassing	Scoobie Quando	8	$117,700	Ben Colebrook	Andrew N. & Rania Warren	
not nominated	Groveland	8	$40,000	Eoin Harty	Godolphin	
not nominated	Bromley	8	$18,300	Paulo Lobo	OXO Equine	
bypassing	Hayes Strike	7	$168,250	Kenneth G. McPeek	Dixiana Farm	
bypassing	Andiamo a Firenze	7	$72,000	Kelly J. Breen	Mr. Amore Stable	
injured	Frosted Departure	6	$222,112	Kenneth G. McPeek	C&H Diamond Racing & Magdalena Racing	
bypassing	West Coast Cowboy	6	$34,250	Saffie Joseph Jr.	Gentry Farms	
bypassing	Bourbon Bash	5	$33,750	D. Wayne Lukas	BC Stables	
bypassing	Clear the Air	5	$24,500	Will Walden	Cypress Creek Equine	
bypassing	Single Ruler	5	$8,000	Keith Desormeaux	Rocker O Ranch	
injured	Loggins	4	$106,500	Brad H. Cox	Spendthrift Farm, Steve Landers Racing, Martin S. Schwartz, Michael Dubb, Ten Strike Racing, Jim Bakke, Titletown Racing Stables, Kueber Racing, Big Easy Racing & Winners Win	
injured	Honed	4	$65,700	Kenneth G. McPeek	Three Chimneys Farm & Magdalena Racing	
injured	Legacy Isle	4	$44,325	Rohan Crichton	Daniel L. Walters, Dennis G. Smith, Anthony Smith & Rohan Crichton	
injured	Moon Landing	4	$6,150	Kevin Attard	Robert V. LaPenta, e Five Racing Thoroughbreds & Madaket Stables	
injured	Gulfport	3	$267,070	Steven M. Asmussen	William L. & Corinne Heiligbrodt, Jackpot Farm, Whispering Oaks Farm & Coolmore Stud	
injured	Tuskegee Airmen	3	$90,000	John C. Servis	Cash Is King & LC Racing	
not nominated	Echo Again	3	$48,625	Steven M. Asmussen	Winchell Thoroughbreds	
bypassing	Determinedly	3	$20,500	Mark E. Casse	John C. Oxley	
not nominated	Harcyn	3	$12,000	Steve Sherman	Jerry Moss	
not nominated	Packs a Wahlop	2	$196,000	Jeff Mullins	Red Baron's Barn & Rancho Temescal	
not nominated	Zydeceaux	2	$111,000	Ramon Minguet	Stud Carmen Cristina	
not nominated	Passarando	2	$64,450	Steven Specht	Larry D. & Marianne Williams	
not nominated	Prove Right	2	$37,375	James K. Chapman	James K. Chapman & Stuart Tsujimoto	
bypassing	Western Ghent	2	$37,325	D. Wayne Lukas	Bob & Ann Ghent, Laurie & D. Wayne Lukas	
bypassing	Il Miracolo	2	$26,535	Antonio Sano	Alexandres	
not nominated	Gunflash	2	$24,000	Karl Broberg	Jerry Namy	
not nominated	Quick To Accuse	2	$15,000	Horacio De Paz	Rupp Racing	
injured	Tall Boy	2	$12,000	Leandro Mora	Calumet Farm	
bypassing	Demolition Duke	2	$11,250	Brad H. Cox	Thrash & Payne	
injured	Neural Network	2	$9,000	Chad C. Brown	Klaravich Stables	
bypassing	Miranda Rights	2	$4,290	Mark E. Casse	D. J. Stable	
not nominated	Andthewinneris	1	$248,363	Wayne Catalano	Susan Moulton	
not nominated	Campfire Creed	1	$77,000	Danny Pish	Dennis E. Foster	
not nominated	Midnight Trouble	1	$35,000	Peter R. Walder	Paradise Farm Corp., David Staudacher & Peter R. Walder	
not nominated	Man Child	1	$30,000	Ryan Hanson	California Racing Partners, Ciaglia Racing, Michelle Hanson, Richard C. Pearson, Timothy J. Husted & Robert Drenk	
bypassing	Champions Dream	1	$20,000	Danny Gargan	Rosedown Racing Stables	

Legend:

Qualified for the Derby
Injured/Bypassing/Inactive/Not nominated

== Prep season ==
=== Initial prep events ===
Note: 1st=10 points; 2nd=4 points; 3rd=3 points; 4th=2 points; 5th=1 point (except the Breeders' Cup Juvenile: 1st=30 points; 2nd=12 points; 3rd=9 points; 4th=6 points; 5th=3 points)

The dates for most races shown below are based on the placement in the racing calendar from 2021/2022. Similarly, the purses shown below are based on the amounts from the previous year and will be updated when finalized.

Race	Distance	Purse	Track	Date	1st	2nd	3rd	4th	5th	Ref
Iroquois	1 1/16 miles	$299,250	Churchill Downs	Sep 17 2022	Curly Jack	Honed	Jace's Road	Hayes Strike	Confidence Game	
Champagne (Note: In 2022 the Champagne Stakes was moved to Aqueduct due to track construction at Belmont Park)	1 mile	$500,000	Aqueduct	Oct 1 2022	Blazing Sevens	Verifying	Gulfport	Andiamo a Firenze	Champions Dream	
American Pharoah	1 1/16 miles	$301,500	Santa Anita	Oct 8 2022	Cave Rock (Note: Horse trained by an individual suspended from the 2022 Kentucky Derby does not receive any qualification points. Cave Rock, National Treasure, Hejazi, Gandolfini and Newgate are trained by Bob Baffert who is suspended by Churchill Downs Inc. through 2023.)	National Treasure	Hejazi	Gandolfini	Man Child	
Breeders' Futurity	1 1/16 miles	$600,000	Keeneland	Oct 8 2022	Forte	Loggins	Red Route One	Instant Coffee	Newgate	
Breeders' Cup Juvenile	1 1/16 miles	$2,000,000	Keeneland	Nov 4 2022	Forte	Cave Rock	National Treasure	Blazing Sevens	Curly Jack	
Kentucky Jockey Club	1 1/16 miles	$399,625	Churchill Downs	Nov 26 2022	Instant Coffee	Curly Jack	Haynes Strike	Red Route One	Denington	
Remsen	1 1/8 miles	$250,000	Aqueduct	Dec 3 2022	Dubyuhnell	Arctic Arrogance	Tuskegee Airmen	Quick to Accuse	Midnight Trouble	
Los Alamitos Futurity	1 1/16 miles	$200,000	Los Alamitos	Dec 17 2022	Practical Move	Carmel Road (Note: Horse trained by an individual suspended from the 2022 Kentucky Derby does not receive any qualification points. Carmel Road, Fort Bragg and Arabian Lion are trained by Bob Baffert who is suspended by Churchill Downs Inc. through 2023.)	Fort Bragg	Tall Boy	Arabian Lion	
Springboard Mile	1 mile	$400,000	Remington	Dec 17 2022	Wildatlanticstorm (Note: Horses that ran with medication (Lasix) do not receive any points towards qualification. Wildatlanticstorm and Giant Mischief received no points from the Springboard Mile.)	Giant Mischief	Echo Again	Gunflash	Campfire Creed	
Gun Runner Stakes	1 1/16 miles	$98,000	Fair Grounds	Dec 26 2022	Jace's Road	Raise Cain	Determinedly	Hayes Strike	Andthewinneris	
Smarty Jones	1 mile	$250,000	Oaklawn	Jan 1 2023	Victory Formation	Angel of Empire	Denington	Western Ghent	How Did He Do That	
Jerome	1 mile	$150,000	Aqueduct	Jan 7 2023	Lugan Knight	Arctic Arrogance	General Banker	Neural Network	Andiamo a Firenze	
Sham	1 mile	$100,000	Santa Anita	Jan 8 2023	Reincarnate (Note: Horse trained by an individual suspended from the 2022 Kentucky Derby does not receive any qualification points. Reincarnate, Newgate and National Treasure are trained by Bob Baffert who is suspended by Churchill Downs Inc. through 2023.)	Newgate	National Treasure	Packs a Wahlop	— (Note: Spun Intended the fifth starter in the Sham Stakes was pulled up during the event and was vanned off not completing the race)	
El Camino Real Derby	1 1/8 miles	$101,350	Golden Gate	Feb 11 2023	Chase the Chaos	Gilmore (Note: Horse trained by an individual suspended from the 2022 Kentucky Derby does not receive any qualification points. Gilmore and Nullarbor are trained by Bob Baffert who is suspended by Churchill Downs Inc. through 2023.)	Harcyn	Passarando	Nullarbor	

=== Select prep events ===
Note: 1st=20 points; 2nd=8 points; 3rd=6 points; 4th=4 points; 5th=2 points

Race	Distance	Purse	Track	Date	1st	2nd	3rd	4th	5th	Ref
Lecomte	1 1/16 miles	$194,000	Fair Grounds	Jan 21 2023	Instant Coffee	Two Phil's	Confidence Game	Denington	Bromley	
Southwest	1 1/16 miles	$750,000	Oaklawn	Jan 28 2023	Arabian Knight (Note: Horse trained by an individual suspended from the 2022 Kentucky Derby does not receive any qualification points. Arabian Knight is trained by Bob Baffert who is suspended by Churchill Downs Inc. through 2023.)	Red Route One	Frosted Departure	Sun Thunder	Jace's Road	
Holy Bull	1 1/16 miles	$250,000	Gulfstream	Feb 4 2023	Rocket Can	Shadow Dragon	West Coast Cowboy	Legacy Isle	Il Miracolo	
Robert B. Lewis (Note: All the entries in the Robert B. Lewis Stakes were trained by Bob Baffert who is suspended by Churchill Downs Inc. through 2023. Hence, none of the finishers earned any qualification points.)	1 1/16 miles	$196,000	Santa Anita	Feb 4 2023	Newgate	Hard To Figure	Worcester	Arabian Lion	—	
Withers (Note: Originally the Withers Stakes was scheduled for February 4, 2023 but NYRA canceled the meeting due to high winds and frigid temperatures forecast to impact the New York metropolitan area)	1 1/8 miles	$250,000	Aqueduct	Feb 11 2023	Hit Show	Arctic Arrogance	General Banker	Andiamo a Firenze	Prove Right	
Sam F. Davis Stakes	1 1/16 miles	$200,000	Tampa Bay	Feb 11 2023	Litigate	Groveland	Classic Car Wash	Classic Legacy	Zydeceaux	
John Battaglia Memorial Stakes	1 1/16 miles	$147,500	Turfway	Mar 4 2023	Congruent	Scoobie Quando	Bromley	Moon Landing	Miranda Rights	

== Championship series events ==
=== First leg of series ===
Note: 1st=50 points; 2nd=20 points; 3rd=15 points; 4th=10 points; 5th=5 points

Race	Distance	Purse	Grade	Track	Date	1st	2nd	3rd	4th	5th	Ref
Risen Star	1 1/8 miles	$400,000	2	Fair Grounds	Feb 18 2023	Angel of Empire	Sun Thunder	Two Phil's	Tapit's Conquest	Single Ruler	
Rebel	1 1/16 miles	$1,000,000	2	Oaklawn	Feb 25 2023	Confidence Game	Red Route One	Reincarnate	Verifying	Bourbon Bash	
Fountain of Youth	1 1/16 miles	$400,000	2	Gulfstream	Mar 4 2023	Forte	Rocket Can	Cyclone Mischief	Mage	Shadow Dragon	
Gotham	1 mile	$300,000	3	Aqueduct	Mar 4 2023	Raise Cain	Slip Mahoney	General Banker	Eyeing Clover	Clear the Air	
San Felipe	1 1/16 miles	$402,000	2	Santa Anita	Mar 4 2023	Practical Move	Geaux Rocket Ride	Skinner	Hejazi	Fort Bragg	
Tampa Bay Derby	1 1/16 miles	$360,000	3	Tampa Bay	Mar 11 2023	Tapit Trice	Classic Car Wash	Classic Legacy	Prairie Hawk	Lord Miles	
Sunland Derby	1 1/8 miles	$600,000	3	Sunland Park	Mar 26 2023	Wild On Ice	Low Expectations	Henry Q	How Did He Do That	One In Vermillion	

=== Second leg of series ===
These races are the major preps for the Kentucky Derby, and are thus weighted more heavily. Note: 1st=100 points; 2nd=40 points; 3rd=30 points; 4th=20 points; 5th=10 points

Race	Distance	Purse	Grade	Track	Date	1st	2nd	3rd	4th	5th	Ref
UAE Derby	1,900 metres (~1 3/16 miles)	$1,000,000	2	Meydan	Mar 25 2023	Derma Sotogake	Dura Erede	Continuar	Perriere	Go Soldier Go	
Louisiana Derby	1 3/16 miles	$1,000,000	2	Fair Grounds	Mar 25 2023	Kingsbarns	Disarm	Jace's Road	Shopper's Revenge	Sun Thunder	
Jeff Ruby	1 1/8 miles	$694,000	3	Turfway	Mar 25 2023	Two Phil's	Major Dude	Funtastic Again	Wadsworth	Maker's Candy	
Florida Derby	1 1/8 miles	$1,000,000	1	Gulfstream	Apr 1 2023	Forte	Mage	Cyclone Mischief	Mr. Ripple	Fort Bragg	
Arkansas Derby	1 1/8 miles	$1,250,000	1	Oaklawn Park	Apr 1 2023	Angel of Empire	King Russell	Reincarnate	Rocket Can	Airtime	
Blue Grass Stakes	1 1/8 miles	$998,125	1	Keeneland	Apr 8 2023	Tapit Trice	Verifying	Blazing Sevens	Sun Thunder	Raise Cain	
Santa Anita Derby	1 1/8 miles	$751,500	1	Santa Anita	Apr 8 2023	Practical Move	Mandarin Hero	Skinner	National Treasure	One In Vermillion	
Wood Memorial	1 1/8 miles	$750,000	2	Aqueduct	Apr 8 2023	Lord Miles	Hit Show	Dreamlike	Arctic Arrogance	Classic Catch	

=== "Wild Card" events ===
Note: 1st=20 points; 2nd=8 points; 3rd=6 points; 4th=4 points; 5th=2 points

Race	Distance	Purse	Track	Date	1st	2nd	3rd	4th	5th	Ref
Lexington	1 1/8 miles	$200,000	Keeneland	Apr 15 2023	First Mission	Arabian Lion	Disarm	Denington	Demolition Duke	

== Japan Road to the Kentucky Derby ==
The Japan Road to the Kentucky Derby was intended to provide a place in the Derby starting gate to the top finisher in the series. If the connections of that horse declined the invitation, their place was offered to the second-place finisher and so on through the top five finishers.

Race	Distance	Track	Date	1st	2nd	3rd	4th	5th	Ref
Cattleya Sho	1,600 metres (~1 mile)	Tokyo Racecourse	Nov 26	Continuar	Mirror of Mind	Jasri	Plavi	Froncorchamps	
Zen-Nippon Nisai Yushun	1,600 metres (~1 mile)	Kawasaki Racecourse	Dec 14	Derma Sotogake	Omatsuri Otoko	Perriere	Hero Call	Maruka Rapid	
Hyacinth	1,600 metres (~1 mile)	Tokyo Racecourse	Feb 19	Perriere	Z Lien	Eclogite	Great Sand Sea	Goraiko	
Fukuryu	1,800 metres (~1 1/8 miles)	Nakayama Racecourse	Mar 25	Mitono O	Mokku Mokku	Hero Call	Eifer Teio	Oro y Plata	

Note:
Cattleya Sho: 1st=10 points; 2nd=4 points; 3rd=3 points; 4th=2 points; 5th=1 point
Zen-Nippon Nisai Yushun: 1st=20 points; 2nd=8 points; 3rd=6 points; 4th=4 points; 5th=2 points
Hyacinth: 1st=30 points; 2nd=12 points; 3rd=9 points; 4th=6 points; 5th=3 points
Fukuyru : 1st=40 points; 2nd=16 points; 3rd=12 points; 4th=8 points; 5th=4 points
ƒ Filly

Qualification Table

The top four horses (colored brown within the standings) are eligible to participate in the Kentucky Derby provided the horse is nominated.

Rank	Horse	Points	Eligible Earnings	Trainer	Owner	Ref
1	Derma Sotogake (JPN)	120	$1,163,361	Hidetaka Otonashi	Hiroyuki Asanuma	
2	Perriere (JPN)	56	$383,704	Yoichi Kuroiwa	Yuji Hasegawa	
3	Continuar (JPN)	40	$338,095	Yoshito Yahagi	Lion Race Horse Co. Ltd.	Qualified (Note: Continuar (JPN) has accepted an invitation to compete in the Kentucky Derby accruing 40 points in the Japan Road to the Kentucky Derby series.)
not nominated	Mitono O (JPN)	40	$273,281	Koji Maki	Royal Park	
not nominated	Hero Call (JPN)	16	$367,641	Satoshi Kokubo	Yusuke Yamaguchi	
4	Mokku Mokku (JPN)	16	$165,530	Ryo Terashima	Masayuki Yamaguchi	
not nominated	Z Lien (JPN)	12	$172,038	Naohiro Yoshida	Forest Co. Ltd.	
5	Eclogite (JPN)	9	$146,056	Takayuki Yusada	Sunday Racing Co.	
not nominated	Omatsuri Otoko (JPN)	8	$504,449	Keizo Ito	Kohei Koreeda	
not nominated	Eifer Teio (JPN)	8	$124,570	Ippo Sameshima	Minoru Nakashima	
not nominated	Great Sand Sea	6	$207,727	Mitsumasa Nakauchida	Sanshisuimei	
not nominated	Oro Oro y Plata (JPN)	4	$112,788	Hiroshi Miyamoto	Katsumi Yoshida	
not nominated	Mirror of Mind (JPN)	4	$112,662	Koichi Shinkai	Shadai Race Horse	
6	Goraiko (JPN)	3	$307,588	Koichi Shintani	Koji Oka	
not nominated	Jasri (JPN)	3	$109,039	Toshiaki Tajima	Yoko Koshimura	
not nominated	Maruka Rapid (JPN)	2	$217,526	Keizo Ito	Takeshi Kusakabe	
7	Plavi (JPN)	2	$90,138	Haruki Sugiyama	Yuji Hasegawa	
not nominated	Francorchamps (JPN)	1	$48,551	Noboru Takagi	La Mere	

Notes:

- brown highlight – qualified
- grey highlight – did not qualify

== European Road to the Kentucky Derby ==
The European Road to the Kentucky Derby was designed on a similar basis to the Japan Road and was intended to provide a place in the Derby starting gate to the top finisher in the series. If the connections of that horse declined the invitation, their place was offered to the second-place finisher and so on. If none of the top four accept, this place in the starting gate reverted to the horses on the main road to the Derby.

The series consisted of seven races – four run on the turf in late 2022 when the horses are age two, plus three races run on a synthetic surface in early 2023.

Race	Distance	Track	Date	1st	2nd	3rd	4th	5th	Ref
Royal Lodge Stakes (Note: There were only four starters in the Royal Lodge Stakes)	1 mile	Newmarket	Sep 24 2022	The Foxes	Dubai Mile	Flying Honours	Greenland	—	
Beresford Stakes	1 mile	The Curragh	Sep 24 2022	Crypto Force	Adelaide River	Young Ireland	Roaring Gallagher	Lakota Seven	
Prix Jean-Luc Lagardère	1,400 metres (about 7 furlongs)	Longchamp	Oct 2 2022	Belbek	Gamestop	Breizh Sky	Shartash	Vicious Harry	
Vertem Futurity Trophy	1 mile	Doncaster	Oct 22 2022	Auguste Rodin	Epictetus	Holloway Boy	Dancing Magic	Salt Lake City	
Patton Stakes	1 mile	Dundalk	Mar 3 2023	Cairo	News At Ten	Stormy Entry	Cash Out	Miss Caruso	
Road to the Kentucky Derby Conditions Stakes	1 mile	Kempton Park	Mar 15 2023	Brave Emperor	Alzahir	Tenjin	Killybegs Warrior	Coco Jack	
Cardinal Stakes	1 mile	Chelmsford City	Apr 1 2023	Bold Act	Brave Emperor	Killybegs Warrior	Iconic Moment	Alzahir	

Note:

- the four races in 2022 for two-year-olds: 1st=10 points; 2nd=4 points; 3rd=3 points; 4th=2 points; 5th=1 point
- the first two races in 2023: 1st=20 points; 2nd=8 points; 3rd=6 points; 4th=4 points; 5th=2 points
- The Cardinal Condition Stakes: 1st=30 points; 2nd=12 points; 3rd=9 points; 4th=6 points 5th=3 points

Qualification Table

The top four horses (colored brown within the standings) were eligible to participate in the Kentucky Derby provided the horse was nominated.

Rank	Horse	Points	Eligible Earnings	Trainer	Owner	Ref
1	Brave Emperor	32	$29,379	Archie Watson	Middleham Park Racing	
not nominated	Bold Act	30	$0	Charlie Appleby	Godolphin	
2	Cairo	20	$62,984	Aidan O'Brien	Derrick Smith, Mrs. John Magnier, Michael Tabor & Westerburg	
not nominated	Killybegs Warrior	13	$1,791	Charlie Johnston	Mr. M. Doyle	
not nominated	Alzahir	11	$228,000	John & Thady Gosden	Al Wasmiyah Stud, G. Bailey, N. Wrigley	
not nominated	Belbek	10	$279,323	Andre Fabre	Nurlan Bizakov	
not nominated	Auguste Rodin	10	$222,687	Aidan O'Brien	Derrick Smith, Mrs. John Magnier, Michael Tabor & Westerburg	
not nominated	The Foxes	10	$76,913	Andrew Balding	King Power Racing	
not nominated	Crypto Force	10	$69,768	Michael O’Callaghan	Amo Racing	
not nominated	News At Ten	8	$8,478	Michael O’Callaghan	Michael O’Callaghan	
not nominated	Iconic Moment	6	$31,154	James Tate	Sultan Ali	
not nominated	Tenjin	6	$5,914	John Ryan	Mr. Jon A. Thompson	
3	Stormy Entry	6	$4,239	W.P. Browne	Charles E. Fipke	
not nominated	Gamestop	4	$101,588	Christophe Ferland	Wertheimer et Frère	
not nominated	Epictetus	4	$64,909	John & Thady Gosden	George Strawbridge	
not nominated	Adelaide River	4	$39,267	Aidan O'Brien	Derrick Smith, Mrs. John Magnier, Michael Tabor & Westerburg	
not nominated	Dubai Mile	4	$29,159	Charlie Johnston	Ahmad Al Shaikh	
not nominated	Cash Out	4	$2,120	Joseph O'Brien	R. Scarborough	
not nominated	Holloway Boy	3	$158,185	Karl Burke	Nick White & Mrs. E. Burke	
not nominated	Breizh Sky	3	$91,301	Alessandro & Giusppe Botti	Alain Jathiere & Ecurie Elag	
not nominated	Flying Honours	3	$39,968	Charlie Appleby	Godolphin	
not nominated	Young Ireland	3	$12,833	Jim Bolger	Mrs. Jim S. Bolger	
not nominated	Shartash	2	$160,989	Johnny Murtagh	Aga Khan	
not nominated	Dancing Magic	2	$26,226	Roger Teal	Fishdance	
4	Greenland	2	$9,011	Aidan O'Brien	Derrick Smith, Mrs. John Magnier, Michael Tabor & Westerburg	

Notes:

- brown highlight – qualified
- grey highlight – did not qualify
