= Geaux Rocket Ride =

American-bred Thoroughbred racehorse (2020–2023)

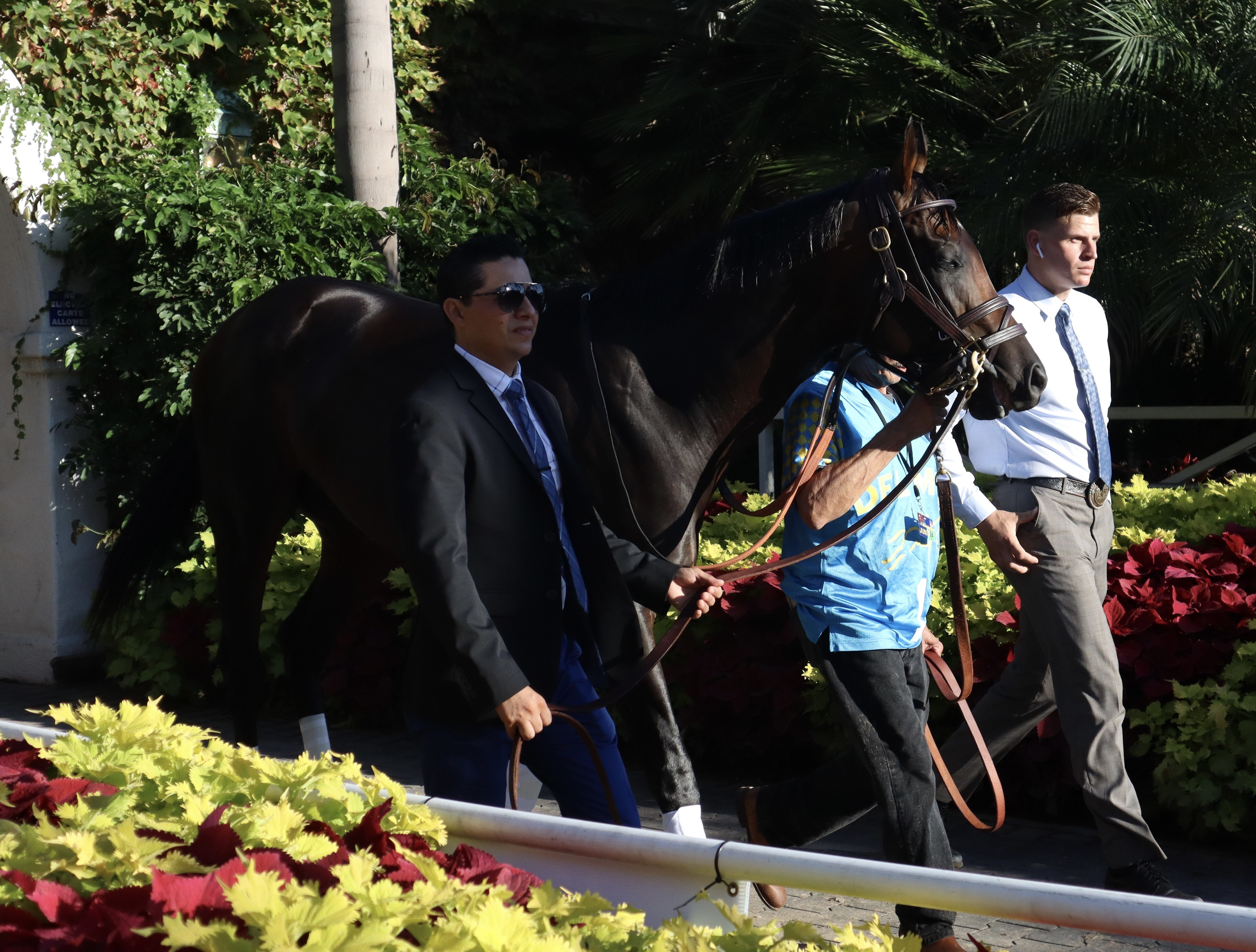
- Geaux Rocket Ride being led to the paddock before the 2023 Pacific Classic
- Sire: Candy Ride (ARG)
- Grandsire: Ride the Rails
- Dam: Beyond Grace
- Damsire: Uncle Mo
- Sex: Colt
- Foaled: April 4, 2020
- Died: November 1, 2023 (aged 3)
- Country: United States
- Color: Bay
- Breeder: OXO Equine
- Owner: Pin Oak Stud (James Bernhard)
- Trainer: Richard E. Mandella
- Record: 5: 3-2-0
- Earnings: $980,200

Major wins
- Haskell Stakes (2023)
- Last updated on September 3, 2023

Geaux Rocket Ride (April 4, 2020 – November 1, 2023) was an American Thoroughbred racehorse who won the Grade I Haskell Stakes at Monmouth Park in 2023 as a three-year-old.

== Background ==
Geaux Rocket Ride was a bay colt that was bred in Kentucky, United States by OXO Equine in 2020. He was sired by Argentine-bred Candy Ride, winner of the 2003 Grade I Pacific Classic Stakes. Geaux Rocket Ride earned Candy Ride his 18th Group 1/Grade I victory. Candy Ride stands at Lane's End Farm for $75,000. Out of the Uncle Mo mare Beyond Grace, Geaux Rocket Ride was purchased from the Taylor Made Sales Agency consignment at the 2021 Fasig-Tipton Kentucky Select Yearling Sale by James Bernhard for $350,000 under the advisement of Matthew Weinmann. James Bernhard later bought the historic Pin Oak Stud in Kentucky in November 2022 and registered the horse under the stud's ownership.

Beyond Grace was a full-sister to SP Mighty Mo, and was out of Flowers Athefinish, a half to Grade III winner Lotus Pool and Grade I placed Golden Larch. In 2023 the mare produced a filly by Rowayton earlier this season and was bred back to Instilled Regard.

== Career ==
Geaux Rocket Ride debuted with an eye-catching 5 3/4-length victory going six furlongs at Santa Anita on January 29, 2023, before coming home a respectable second to Practical Move in the 8 1/2-furlong GII San Felipe Stakes on March 4. Geaux Rocket Ride missed the GI Santa Anita Derby because of a fever with Practical Move winning the Santa Anita Derby. Geaux Rocket Ride once again found the winner's circle in the Santa Anita's Listed Affirmed Stakes on June 4.

His next start would be his grade 1 debut in the Haskell Stakes. It was the first time his trainer Richard Mandella had run a horse in the Haskell since the year 2000 when he ran that years winner Dixie Union. Among his rivals were the 2023 Kentucky Derby Mage and Arabian Knight who despite not racing since February was the post time favorite. Arabian Knight broke the fastest with Salute the Soldier while Geaux Rocket Ride rested a few lengths behind them. He got on even terms when they reached the far turn and past him at the top of the stretch. Mage would mount a challenge on the outside but Geaux Rocket successfully held him off to win his first Grade 1.

Geaux Rocket Ride did not stay on the east coast for the Travers Stakes and the plan was always to bring him back to California for his next race. The Pacific Classic would be a new challenge for Geaux Rocket Ride as it was the first time he would go the classic distance of 1 1/4 and the first time he would face against older horses.

He would have another match against Arabian Knight where the race initially started the same way as the Haskell. Arabian Knight took the lead but this time had no one to challenge him early and Geaux Rocket Ride stalked in third. Geaux Rocket Ride would charge late on the outside but this time was unable to catch Arabian Knight and lost by a neck.

== Injury and death ==
In preparation for the Breeders' Cup, Geaux Rocket Ride sustained a serious condylar fracture during a morning run at Santa Anita Park. On November 1, 2023, Pin Oak Stud announced that Geaux Rocket Ride had been euthanized. He was 3.

== Statistics ==
Date	Distance	Race	Grade	Track	Odds	Field	Finish	Winning Time	Winning (Losing) Margin	Jockey	Ref
2023 – Three-year-old season
Jan 29, 2023	6 furlongs	Maiden Special Weight		Santa Anita	6.10	6	1	1:09.52	5 3/4 lengths	Flavien Prat	
Mar 4, 2023	1 1/16 miles	San Felipe Stakes	II	Santa Anita	2.70*	9	2	1:42.01	(2 1/2 lengths)	Flavien Prat	
Jun 4, 2023	1 1/16 miles	Affirmed Stakes	Listed	Santa Anita	0.50*	5	1	1:43.75	1 3/4 lengths	Ramon Vazquez	
Jul 22, 2023	1 1/8 miles	Haskell Stakes	I	Monmouth Park	12.70	8	1	1:49.52	1 3/4 lengths	Mike E. Smith	
Sep 2, 2023	1 1/4 miles	Pacific Classic Stakes	I	Del Mar	2.20	10	2	2:03.19	(neck)	Mike E. Smith	

Notes:
An (*) asterisk after the odds means Geaux Rocket Ride was the post-time favorite.

== Pedigree ==
Pedigree of Geaux Rocket Ride (USA), bay colt, foaled April 4, 2020
Sire Candy Ride (ARG) (1999)	Ride the Rails (1991)	Cryptoclearance (1984)	Fappiano (1977)
Sire Candy Ride (ARG) (1999)	Ride the Rails (1991)	Cryptoclearance (1984)	Naval Orange (1975)
Sire Candy Ride (ARG) (1999)	Ride the Rails (1991)	Herbalesian (1969)	Herbager (FR) (1956)
Sire Candy Ride (ARG) (1999)	Ride the Rails (1991)	Herbalesian (1969)	Alanesian (1954)
Sire Candy Ride (ARG) (1999)	Candy Girl (ARG) (2008)	Candy Stripes (1982)	Blushing Groom (FR) (1974)
Sire Candy Ride (ARG) (1999)	Candy Girl (ARG) (2008)	Candy Stripes (1982)	Bubble Company (FR) (1977)
Sire Candy Ride (ARG) (1999)	Candy Girl (ARG) (2008)	City Girl (ARG) (1982)	Farnesio (ARG) (1974)
Sire Candy Ride (ARG) (1999)	Candy Girl (ARG) (2008)	City Girl (ARG) (1982)	Cithara (1975)
Dam Beyond Grace (2015)	Uncle Mo (1997)	Indian Charlie (1995)	In Excess (IRE) (1987)
Dam Beyond Grace (2015)	Uncle Mo (1997)	Indian Charlie (1995)	Soviet Sojourn (1989)
Dam Beyond Grace (2015)	Uncle Mo (1997)	Playa Maya (2000)	Arch (1995)
Dam Beyond Grace (2015)	Uncle Mo (1997)	Playa Maya (2000)	Dixie Slippers (1995)
Dam Beyond Grace (2015)	Flowers Athefinish (2007)	Grand Reward (2001)	Storm Cat (1983)
Dam Beyond Grace (2015)	Flowers Athefinish (2007)	Grand Reward (2001)	Serena's Song (1992)
Dam Beyond Grace (2015)	Flowers Athefinish (2007)	Golden Petal (1981)	Mr. Prospector (1970)
Dam Beyond Grace (2015)	Flowers Athefinish (2007)	Golden Petal (1981)	Hatton's Rose (1973) (Family: 1-n)
