= Cave Rock (horse) =

American-bred Thoroughbred racehorse (2020–2023)

- Sire: Arrogate
- Grandsire: Unbridled's Song
- Dam: Georgie's Angel
- Damsire: Bellamy Road
- Sex: Colt
- Foaled: March 12, 2020; Louisville, Kentucky, U.S.
- Died: August 18, 2023 (aged 3); Bonsall, California, U.S.
- Country: United States
- Color: Dark Bay or Brown
- Breeder: Anne and Ronnie Sheffer Racing
- Owner: Karl Watson, Michael E. Pegram, and Paul Weitman
- Trainer: Bob Baffert
- Record: 4: 3-1-0
- Earnings: $748,000

Major wins
- Del Mar Futurity (2022); American Pharoah Stakes (2022)
- Last updated on November 5, 2022

Cave Rock (March 12, 2020 – August 18, 2023) was an American multiple Grade I–winning Thoroughbred racehorse who won the Grade I American Pharoah Stakes and Del Mar Futurity as a two-year-old.

== Background ==
Cave Rock was a dark bay or brown colt that was bred in Kentucky by Anne and Ronnie Sheffer Racing. He was sired by Arrogate, the 2016 American Champion three-year-old colt. Cave Rock was trained by trainer Bob Baffert who with bloodstock agent Donato Lanni selected Cave Rock for the partnership, which buys horses in the name of Three Amigos – Karl Watson, Michael E. Pegram & Paul Weitman. They purchased the colt from Gainesway for $550,000 at the 2021 Keeneland September yearling sale. His dam Georgie's Angel, won the 2011 Schuylerville Stakes at Saratoga for the breeders of Cave Rock, Anne and Ronnie Sheffer Racing who were part owners of mare. Georgie's Angel has produced four winners from five starters, including three-time winner Take Charge Angel, an earner of $166,055. The mare has a yearling colt by Arrogate and a weanling filly by Improbable. She was bred to Connect this year.

The name Cave Rock comes from a historic large rock formation above Lake Tahoe in Nevada. Cave Rock is sacred to Native American tribes. Highway 50 from Carson City, Nevada, to South Lake Tahoe, California, goes into a dual road tunnel, and through Cave Rock.

== Racing career ==
=== 2022: two-year-old season ===
Cave Rock began his career on August 13 at Del Mar Racetrack in a Maiden Special Weight event for two-year-olds over a distance of 6 1/2 furlongs facing eight other first-starters. Cave Rock started as the 6/5 favorite Cave Rock got bumped from outside at the start by Alexander Helios. He moved to the front and set the pace up the backstretch extending his lead around the turn and was coaxed lightly in upper stretch by jockey Juan Hernandez winning easily by six lengths in a time of 1:15.81.

Cave Rock's next start was on September 11 in the Grade I Del Mar Futurity at Del Mar over a distance of seven furlongs. From the start Cave Rock verged to the lead with Havnameltdown posting fractions for the first quarter-mile in :21.56 and the half-mile in :43.56. In the stretch, Cave Rock drew away from Havnameltdown winning by 5 1/4 lengths in stakes record time of 1:20.99, surpassing the previous record by Declan's Moon of 1:21.29 in 2004. The Hall of Fame trainer Bob Baffert won his 16th Del Mar Futurity.

With such a commanding performance Bob Baffert entered Cave Rock in the Grade I American Pharoah Stakes at Santa Anita Park over a distance of one and one-sixteenth miles. On October 8, 2022, Cave Rock was sent off as the 2/5 odds-on faced seven other entrants including three other Bob Baffert trainees. Cave Rock broke nicely set fractions of :22.96, :46.82, and 1:11.07 while the other Baffert runners ran behind him. Hejazi raced outside of National Treasure, and Gandolfini, who broke from the rail, remained on the inside. Cave Rock's early 1 1/2-length margin became 2 1/2 lengths after six furlongs, and then Cave Rock's lead continued to increase winning by 5 1/2 lengths in a time of 1:43.05, the fastest time since 2014 when American Pharoah won the event. By winning the American Pharoah Stakes, Cave Rock qualified to the GI Breeders' Cup Juvenile, in which he started as the betting favorite but was defeated by Forte.

== Death ==
Cave Rock had been in contention for the 2023 Kentucky Derby with strong workouts between February and April, but never returned to the races. In late July 2023 Cave Rock was hospitalized and was eventually diagnosed with a hernia, requiring immediate surgery. After showing signs of improvement during recovery, Cave Rock developed laminitis and was euthanized on August 18, 2023.

== Statistics ==
Date	Distance	Race	Grade	Track	Odds	Field	Finish	Winning Time	Winning (Losing) Margin	Jockey	Ref
2022 – two-year-old season
Aug 13, 2022	6 1/2 furlongs	Maiden Special Weight		Del Mar	1.20*	9	1	1:15.81	6 lengths	Juan Hernandez	
Sep 11, 2022	7 furlongs	Del Mar Futurity	I	Del Mar	0.40*	9	1	1:20.99	5 1/4 lengths	Juan Hernandez	
Oct 8, 2022	1 1/16 miles	American Pharoah Stakes	I	Santa Anita	0.40*	8	1	1:43.05	5 1/4 lengths	Juan Hernandez	
Nov 4, 2022	1 1/16 miles	Breeders' Cup Juvenile	I	Keeneland	0.47*	10	2	1:43.06	(1 1/2 lengths)	Juan Hernandez	

Notes:
An (*) asterisk after the odds means Cave Rock was the post-time favourite.

== Pedigree ==
Pedigree of Cave Rock, Dark Bay or Brown Colt, March 12, 2020
Sire Arrogate (2013)	Unbridled's Song (1993)	Unbridled (1987)	Fappiano (1977)
Sire Arrogate (2013)	Unbridled's Song (1993)	Unbridled (1987)	Gana Facil (1981)
Sire Arrogate (2013)	Unbridled's Song (1993)	Trolley Song (1983)	Caro (IRE) (1967)
Sire Arrogate (2013)	Unbridled's Song (1993)	Trolley Song (1983)	Lucky Spell (1971)
Sire Arrogate (2013)	Bubbler (2006)	Distorted Humor (1993)	Forty Niner (1985)
Sire Arrogate (2013)	Bubbler (2006)	Distorted Humor (1993)	Danzig's Beauty (1987)
Sire Arrogate (2013)	Bubbler (2006)	Grechelle (1995)	Deputy Minister (Canada) (1979)
Sire Arrogate (2013)	Bubbler (2006)	Grechelle (1995)	Meadow Star (1988)
Dam Georgie's Angel (2009)	Bellamy Road (2002)	Concerto (1994)	Chief's Crown (1982)
Dam Georgie's Angel (2009)	Bellamy Road (2002)	Concerto (1994)	Undeniably (1987)
Dam Georgie's Angel (2009)	Bellamy Road (2002)	Hurry Home Hillary (1995)	Deputed Testamony (1980)
Dam Georgie's Angel (2009)	Bellamy Road (2002)	Hurry Home Hillary (1995)	Ten Cents a Turn (1990)
Dam Georgie's Angel (2009)	Lalka (Canada) (1999)	Dynaformer (1985)	Roberto (1969)
Dam Georgie's Angel (2009)	Lalka (Canada) (1999)	Dynaformer (1985)	Andover Way (1978)
Dam Georgie's Angel (2009)	Lalka (Canada) (1999)	Celmis (Canada) (1991)	Bold Ruckus (1976)
Dam Georgie's Angel (2009)	Lalka (Canada) (1999)	Celmis (Canada) (1991)	Ada Prospect (Canada) (1981) (family 8h)
