= Angel of Empire =

American-bred Thoroughbred racehorse

- Sire: Classic Empire
- Grandsire: Pioneerof the Nile
- Dam: Armony's Angel
- Damsire: Sambuca Classica
- Sex: Stallion
- Foaled: April 9, 2020 (age 6)
- Country: United States
- Color: Dark Bay
- Breeder: Forgotten Land Investment Inc & Black Diamond Equine
- Owner: Albaugh Family Stables
- Trainer: Brad H. Cox
- Record: 9: 4-2-1
- Earnings: $1,489,375

Major wins
- Risen Star Stakes (2023); Arkansas Derby (2023)
- Last updated on 30 July 2023

Angel of Empire (foaled April 9, 2020) is an American retired Thoroughbred racehorse who won the Grade I Arkansas Derby at Oaklawn Park and Grade II Risen Star Stakes at the Fair Grounds in 2023 as a three-year-old.

== Background ==
Angel of Empire is a dark bay stallion that was bred in Pennsylvania by Forgotten Land Investment and Black Diamond Equine and bought by the Albaugh family for $70,000 from the Warrendale consignment at the 2021 Keeneland September Yearling Sale. He is the first foal from the To Honor and Serve mare Armony's Angel. Angel of Empire was also a $32,000 (Reserve Not Attained) at the 2020 Keeneland November Mixed Sale when consigned by agent St. George Sales.

He was sired by Classic Empire, winner of the 2016 Grade I Breeders' Cup Juvenile at Santa Anita Park and also won the Arkansas Derby in 2017. Classic Empire stands at Ashford Stud for $15,000 in 2023. His dam Armony's Angel was winless in eight start but she is a daughter of sire To Honor and Serve who won of the Grade II Nashua Stakes and Grade II Remsen Stakes running long distances as a juvenile.

Angel of Empire is trained by Brad H. Cox.

== Racing career ==
=== 2022: two-year-old season ===
Angel of Empire ran three times in 2022 for two wins at Horseshoe Indianapolis. His lone defeat was on the turf track at Kentucky Downs

=== 2023: three-year-old season ===
Angel of Empire began his three-year-old campaign on New Year's Day at Oaklawn Park in the one mile Listed Smarty Jones Stakes finishing second by three lengths to odds-on favorite Victory Formation.

Trainer Bad Cox sent Angel of Empire to New Orleans when he stunned a full field of fourteen in the Risen Star Stakes winning by one length at odds of nearly 14/1.

Angel of Empire returned to Oaklawn Park where he finished strongly to win the Grade I Arkansas Derby, a Road to the Kentucky Derby event by 4 1/4 lengths in a time of 1:49.68 and easily qualifying for the 2023 Kentucky Derby.

== Retirement ==
In October 2024, it was announced that Angel of Empire had been retired and would stand at stud at Taylor Made Stallions from the upcoming breeding season, joining their other stallion Not This Time.

== Statistics ==
Date	Distance	Race	Grade	Track	Odds	Field	Finish	Winning Time	Winning (Losing) Margin	Jockey	Ref
2022 – Two-year-old season
Aug 9, 2022	1 mile	Maiden Special Weight		Indianapolis	1.90*	7	1	1:41.40	1 1/2 lengths	Marcelino Pedroza Jr.	
Sep 8, 2022	6 1/2 furlongs	Allowance		Kentucky Downs	3.80	8	6	1:17.94	(8 3/4 lengths)	Florent Geroux	
Nov 14, 2022	1 mile	Allowance		Indianapolis	2.50*	8	1	1:38.69	6 1/4 lengths	Marcelino Pedroza Jr.	
2023 – Three-year-old season
Jan 1, 2023	1 mile	Smarty Jones Stakes	Listed	Oaklawn Park	18.10	8	2	1:38.14	(3 lengths)	Joe Talamo	
Feb 18, 2023	1 1/8 miles	Risen Star Stakes	II	Fair Grounds	13.70	14	1	1:51.47	1 length	Luis Saez	
Apr 1, 2023	1 1/8 miles	Arkansas Derby	I	Oaklawn Park	4.70	10	1	1:49.68	4 1/4 lengths	Flavien Prat	
May 6, 2023	1 1/4 miles	Kentucky Derby	I	Churchill Downs	4.06*	18	3	2:01.57	(1 1/2 lengths)	Flavien Prat	
Jun 10, 2023	1 1/2 miles	Belmont Stakes	I	Belmont Park	5.30	9	4 (Note: Dead heat for fourth place with Hit Show)	2:29.23	(2 1/4 lengths)	Flavien Prat	
Jul 29, 2023	1 1/8 miles	Jim Dandy Stakes	II	Saratoga	5.70	5	3	1:49.61	(1/2 length)	Flavien Prat	

Legend:
Turf Dirt
Notes:
An (*) asterisk after the odds means Angel of Empire was the post-time favorite.

== Pedigree ==
Pedigree of Angel of Empire, Bay colt, April 9, 2020
Sire Classic Empire (2014)	Pioneerof the Nile (2006)	Empire Maker (2000)	Unbridled (1987)
Sire Classic Empire (2014)	Pioneerof the Nile (2006)	Empire Maker (2000)	Toussaud (1989)
Sire Classic Empire (2014)	Pioneerof the Nile (2006)	Star Of Goshen (1994)	Lord At War (ARG) (1980)
Sire Classic Empire (2014)	Pioneerof the Nile (2006)	Star Of Goshen (1994)	Castle Eight (1984)
Sire Classic Empire (2014)	Sambuca Classica (2004)	Cat Thief (1996)	Storm Cat (1983)
Sire Classic Empire (2014)	Sambuca Classica (2004)	Cat Thief (1996)	Train Robbery (1987)
Sire Classic Empire (2014)	Sambuca Classica (2004)	In Her Glory (1990)	Miswaki (1978)
Sire Classic Empire (2014)	Sambuca Classica (2004)	In Her Glory (1990)	Forever Waving (1980)
Dam Armony's Angel (2016)	To Honor and Serve (2008)	Bernardini (2003)	A.P. Indy (1989)
Dam Armony's Angel (2016)	To Honor and Serve (2008)	Bernardini (2003)	Cara Rafaela (1993)
Dam Armony's Angel (2016)	To Honor and Serve (2008)	Pilfer (2001)	Deputy Minister (CAN) (1979)
Dam Armony's Angel (2016)	To Honor and Serve (2008)	Pilfer (2001)	Misty Hour (1995)
Dam Armony's Angel (2016)	Seeinsbelieven (2002)	Carson City (1987)	Mr. Prospector (1970)
Dam Armony's Angel (2016)	Seeinsbelieven (2002)	Carson City (1987)	Blushing Promise (1982)
Dam Armony's Angel (2016)	Seeinsbelieven (2002)	Coragil (1993)	Metfeld (1982)
Dam Armony's Angel (2016)	Seeinsbelieven (2002)	Coragil (1993)	White Jasmine (1977) (family 26)
