= Tapit Trice =

American-bred Thoroughbred racehorse

- Sire: Tapit
- Grandsire: Pulpit
- Dam: Danzatrice
- Damsire: Dunkirk
- Sex: Stallion
- Foaled: February 17, 2020 (age 6)
- Country: United States
- Color: Gray or roan
- Breeder: Gainesway Thoroughbreds
- Owner: Whisper Hill Farm & Gainesway Stable
- Trainer: Todd A. Pletcher
- Record: 13: 6 - 0 - 3
- Earnings: US$1,873,650

Major wins
- Tampa Bay Derby (2023); Blue Grass Stakes (2023); Monmouth Cup (2024); Woodward Stakes (2024)
- Last updated on November 3, 2024

Tapit Trice (foaled February 17, 2020) is an American Thoroughbred racehorse who won the Grade I Blue Grass Stakes at Keeneland in 2023 as a three-year-old.

== Background ==
Tapit Trice is a gray or roan stallion that was bred in Kentucky by Gainesway Thoroughbreds. He was sired by Tapit, the leading sire in the US in 2014, 2015 and 2016. Tapit stands at Gainesway Farm for $185,000 in 2023. Tapit Trice was sold for $1,300,000 at the 2021 Keeneland September Yearling Sale to Amanda Pope's Whisper Hill Farm from the consignment of breeder Antony Beck's Gainesway Farm, which subsequently bought back in as a partner.

Tapit Trice is out of the Grade III-placed (2017 Groupie Doll Stakes) multiple stakes winner Danzatrice, a daughter of 2009 Belmont Stakes runner-up Dunkirk. Danzatrice is a half sister to 2018 US champion two-year-old filly Jaywalk, a two-time grade 1 winner.

Tapit Trice was trained by US Hall of Fame trainer Todd A. Pletcher.

== Racing career ==
=== 2022: two-year-old season ===
Tapit Trice ran two times in late 2022 in Maiden events at Aqueduct Racetrack winning on his second start.

=== 2023: three-year-old season ===
Tapit Trice has run seven times in 2023 winning three of his races. Two of his victories were in major qualification events on the Road to the Kentucky Derby, the Grade III Tampa Bay Derby and then a grinding win in the Grade I Blue Grass Stakes by a neck thus easily qualifying for the 2023 Kentucky Derby. He finished 7th in the Kentucky Derby. He subsequently finished third in the 2023 Belmont Stakes, behind Arcangelo and his stablemate Forte. After managing only fifth place in the Haskell Stakes, Todd Pletcher decided to equip him with blinkers for his next start, the Grade I Travers Stakes. Tapit Trice finished third once again, this time behind Disarm and Arcangelo.

=== 2024: four-year-old season ===
Tapit Trice made only four starts as a four-year-old. After nearly a year on the sidelines, he dominated the Grade III Monmouth Cup, scoring by 5¼ lengths. In September, he finished fourth in the Grade I Jockey Club Gold Cup and captured the Grade II Woodward Stakes by three-quarters of a length over Skippylongstocking. He concluded his career with a sixth-place finish in the 2024 Breeders’ Cup Classic. Following that race, he entered stud at Gainesway.

== Statistics ==
Date	Distance	Race	Grade	Track	Odds	Field	Finish	Winning Time	Winning (Losing) Margin	Jockey	Ref
2022 – Two-year-old season
Nov 13, 2022	1 mile	Maiden Special Weight		Aqueduct	2.00	9	2	1:38.38	(2 1/2 lengths)	Flavien Prat	
Dec 17, 2022	1 mile	Maiden Special Weight		Aqueduct	1.70*	8	1	1:39.05	neck	Kendrick Carmouche	
2023 – Three-year-old season
Feb 4, 2023	1 mile	Allowance		Gulfstream Park	1.30	6	1	1:36.44	8 lengths	Luis Saez	
Mar 11, 2023	1 1/16 miles	Tampa Bay Derby	III	Tampa Bay Downs	0.50*	12	1	1:43.37	2 lengths	Luis Saez	
Apr 8, 2023	1 1/8 miles	Blue Grass Stakes	I	Keeneland	1.64*	11	1	1:50.00	neck	Luis Saez	
May 6, 2023	1 1/4 miles	Kentucky Derby	I	Churchill Downs	4.53	18	7	2:01.57	(9 1/4 lengths)	Luis Saez	
Jun 10, 2023	1 1/2 miles	Belmont Stakes	I	Belmont Park	5.30	9	3	2:29.23	(1 1/2 lengths)	Luis Saez	
Jul 22, 2023	1 1/8 miles	Haskell Stakes	I	Monmouth Park	4.80	8	5	1:49.52	(8 3/4 lengths)	Luis Saez	
Aug 26, 2023	1 1/4 miles	Travers Stakes	I	Saratoga	13.50	7	3	2:02.23	(3 1/2 lengths)	Jose Ortiz	
2024 – Four-year-old season|-
Jul 20, 2024	1 1/8 miles	Monmouth Cup	III	Monmouth Park	2.80	8	1	1:50.46	5 1/4 lengths	Irad Ortiz Jr.	
Sep 1, 2024	1 1/4 miles	Jockey Club Gold Cup	I	Saratoga	2.35	7	4	2:03.25	(6 3/4 lengths)	Irad Ortiz Jr.	
Sep 28, 2024	1 1/8 miles	Woodward Stakes	II	Aqueduct	2.40	4	1	1:50.09	3/4 length	Dylan Davis	
Nov 2, 2024	1 1/4 miles	Breeders' Cup Classic	I	Del Mar	31.30	14	6	2:00.78	(10 3/4 lengths)	Irad Ortiz Jr.	

Notes:
An (*) asterisk after the odds means Tapit Trice was the post-time favorite.

== Pedigree ==
Pedigree of Tapit Trice, Gray or roan colt, February 17, 2020
Sire Tapit (2001)	Pulpit (1994)	A.P. Indy* (1989)	Seattle Slew (1974)
Sire Tapit (2001)	Pulpit (1994)	A.P. Indy* (1989)	Weekend Surprise (1980)
Sire Tapit (2001)	Pulpit (1994)	Preach (1989)	Mr Prospector (1970)
Sire Tapit (2001)	Pulpit (1994)	Preach (1989)	Narrate (1980)
Sire Tapit (2001)	Tap Your Heels (1996)	Unbridled* (1987)	Fappiano (1977)
Sire Tapit (2001)	Tap Your Heels (1996)	Unbridled* (1987)	Gana Facil (1981)
Sire Tapit (2001)	Tap Your Heels (1996)	Ruby Slippers (1982)	Nijinsky II (CAN) (1967)
Sire Tapit (2001)	Tap Your Heels (1996)	Ruby Slippers (1982)	Moon Glitter (1972)
Dam Danzatrice (2012)	Dunkirk (2001)	Unbridled's Song (1993)	Unbridled* (1987)
Dam Danzatrice (2012)	Dunkirk (2001)	Unbridled's Song (1993)	Trolley Song (1983)
Dam Danzatrice (2012)	Dunkirk (2001)	Secret Status (1997)	A.P. Indy* (1989)
Dam Danzatrice (2012)	Dunkirk (2001)	Secret Status (1997)	Private Status (1991)
Dam Danzatrice (2012)	Lady Pewitt (2004)	Orientate (1998)	Mt. Livermore (1981)
Dam Danzatrice (2012)	Lady Pewitt (2004)	Orientate (1998)	Dream Team (1985)
Dam Danzatrice (2012)	Lady Pewitt (2004)	Spin Room (1999)	Spinning World (1993)
Dam Danzatrice (2012)	Lady Pewitt (2004)	Spin Room (1999)	La Paz (1988) (family 19-b)

* Tapit Trice is inbred 3S x 4D to the stallion A. P. Indy, meaning that he appears third generation on the sire side of his pedigree and fourth generation on the dam side of his pedigree.

* Tapit Trice is inbred 3S x 4D to the stallion Unbridled, meaning that he appears third generation on the sire side of his pedigree and fourth generation on the dam side of his pedigree.
