= Classic Empire =

American-bred Thoroughbred racehorse

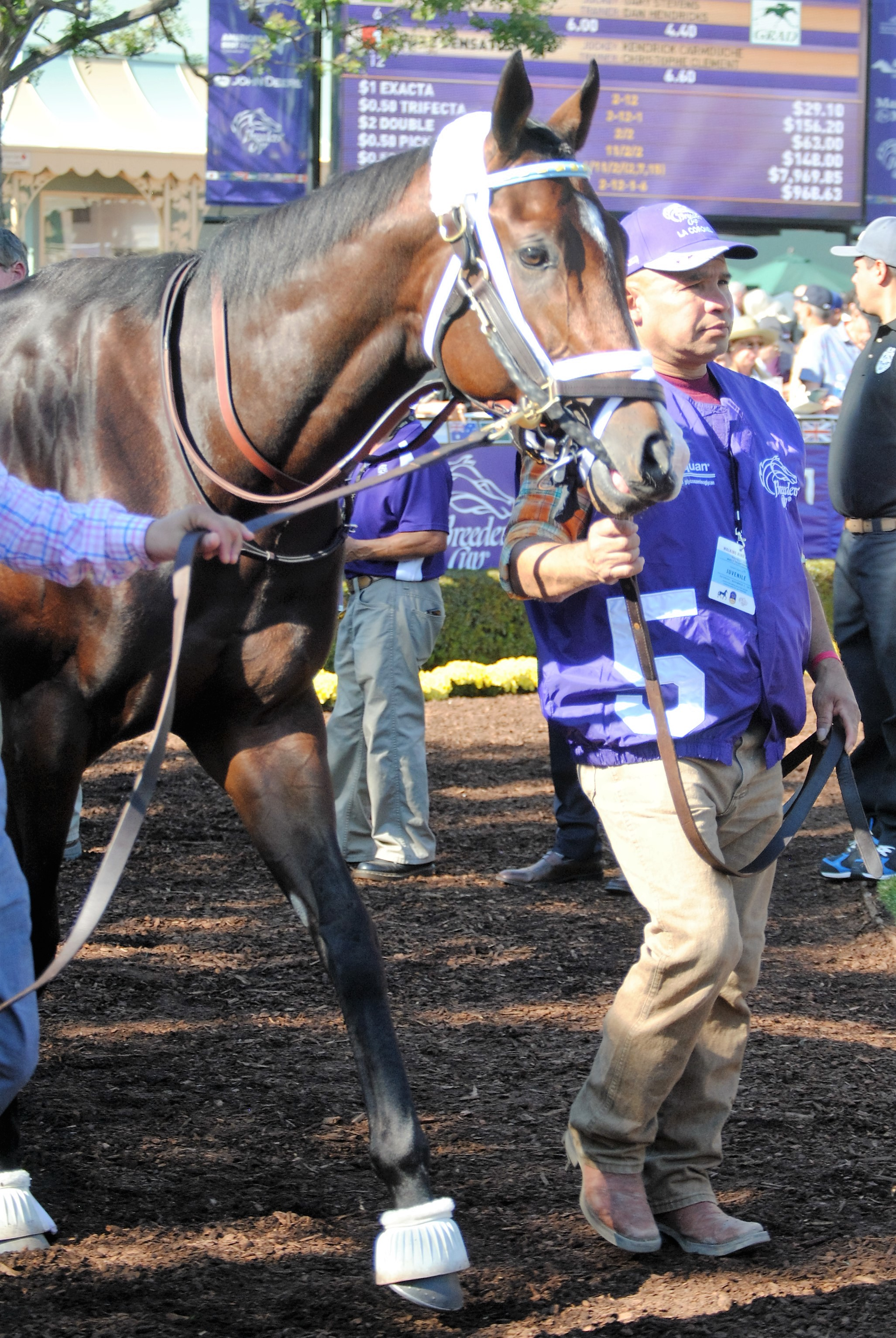
- Classic Empire before the 2016 Breeders' Cup Juvenile
- Sire: Pioneerof the Nile
- Grandsire: Empire Maker
- Dam: Sambuca Classica
- Damsire: Cat Thief
- Sex: Stallion
- Foaled: March 21, 2014 (age 11)
- Country: United States
- Color: Bay
- Breeder: Steven & Brandi Nicholson
- Owner: John C. Oxley
- Trainer: Mark Casse
- Record: 9: 5–1–1
- Earnings: $2,520,220

Major wins
- Bashford Manor Stakes (2016); Breeders' Futurity Stakes (2016); Arkansas Derby (2017); Breeders' Cup wins: Breeders' Cup Juvenile (2016)

Awards
- American Champion Two-Year-Old Male Horse (2016)

Classic Empire (foaled March 21, 2014) is a retired American Thoroughbred race horse who was named the American Champion Two-Year-Old Male Horse of 2016 after winning the Breeders' Futurity Stakes and Breeders' Cup Juvenile. After several setbacks at the start of his three-year-old campaign, he won the Arkansas Derby, finished a troubled fourth in the Kentucky Derby, then second by a head in the Preakness Stakes. Classic Empire was retired due to multiple setbacks from an abscess on his right front hoof, as well as slight back problems which plagued him throughout his career. He stands stud at Ashford Stud, in Kentucky.

== Background ==
Classic Empire is a bay stallion with a white star, stripe, and snip, and a white sock on his left hind leg. He was bred by Steven and Brandi Nicholson in Kentucky. He is by Pioneerof the Nile, best known as the sire of Triple Crown winner American Pharoah. Classic Empire's dam, Sambuca Classica, was winless on the racetrack but came from distinguished bloodlines. She had already produced two stakes winners before foaling Classic Empire.

As a yearling being prepared for sale, Classic Empire was described by his handlers as a "very well-bodied, medium-sized horse, he kind of stood out for folks." He was purchased for $475,000 at the Keeneland September 2015 sale as a yearling by John C. Oxley. He is trained by Mark Casse, who says that despite the colt's athleticism, his most compelling aspect is the way his mind works. "He's extremely, extremely smart. He sees things other horses don't see. We were saying this early on. It can get him in trouble sometimes."

Classic Empire gained a reputation as being a bit of a "bad-boy" in his racing career, after unseating his rider in the Hopeful Stakes and refusing to breeze on several occasions. But Casse said that he didn't merit such a reputation, stating: "Everyone wants to make him out to be this bad boy, but he's not. He doesn't have a mean bone in his body...." Jockey Florent Geroux, who had fallen off the horse during a workout early on in his two-year-old year, commented, "it's not like he wants to hurt you or anything. He doesn't even go anywhere. After I was thrown, I just got back on him and finished the breeze."

== Racing career ==
=== 2016: two-year-old season ===
Classic Empire debuted on May 4 in a Maiden Special Weight race at Churchill Downs. Sent off as the 1-2 favorite and ridden by jockey Julien Leparoux, he broke slowly and rallied from the back of the field to win by 1 1/2 lengths under a hand ride on a track rated as sloppy.

He then started in the Grade III Bashford Manor Stakes on July 2. He was the second choice behind the 1-2 favorite, Recruiting Ready. After another poor start, he stayed at the back for most of the race and moved into contention at the head of the stretch. He then steadily closed ground on Recruiting Ready and won by 3/4 of a length. Recruiting Ready was nine lengths ahead of the third place-finisher. Classic Empire's assistant trainer, Norman Casse, (son of trainer Mark Casse) stated after the race: "I think he's definitely going to be much more effective around two turns."

Due to his previous win, he was made the favorite for the Grade I Hopeful Stakes on September 5. He was ridden by Irad Ortiz Jr., as Leparoux was sidelined with a broken wrist. Classic Empire again broke slowly, then moved sharply to the right, unseating Ortiz. He pulled himself up at the outside rail, then was vanned off the track showing mild lameness. He was reported to be in good shape shortly after the race, but he had hit himself with a hoof while running.

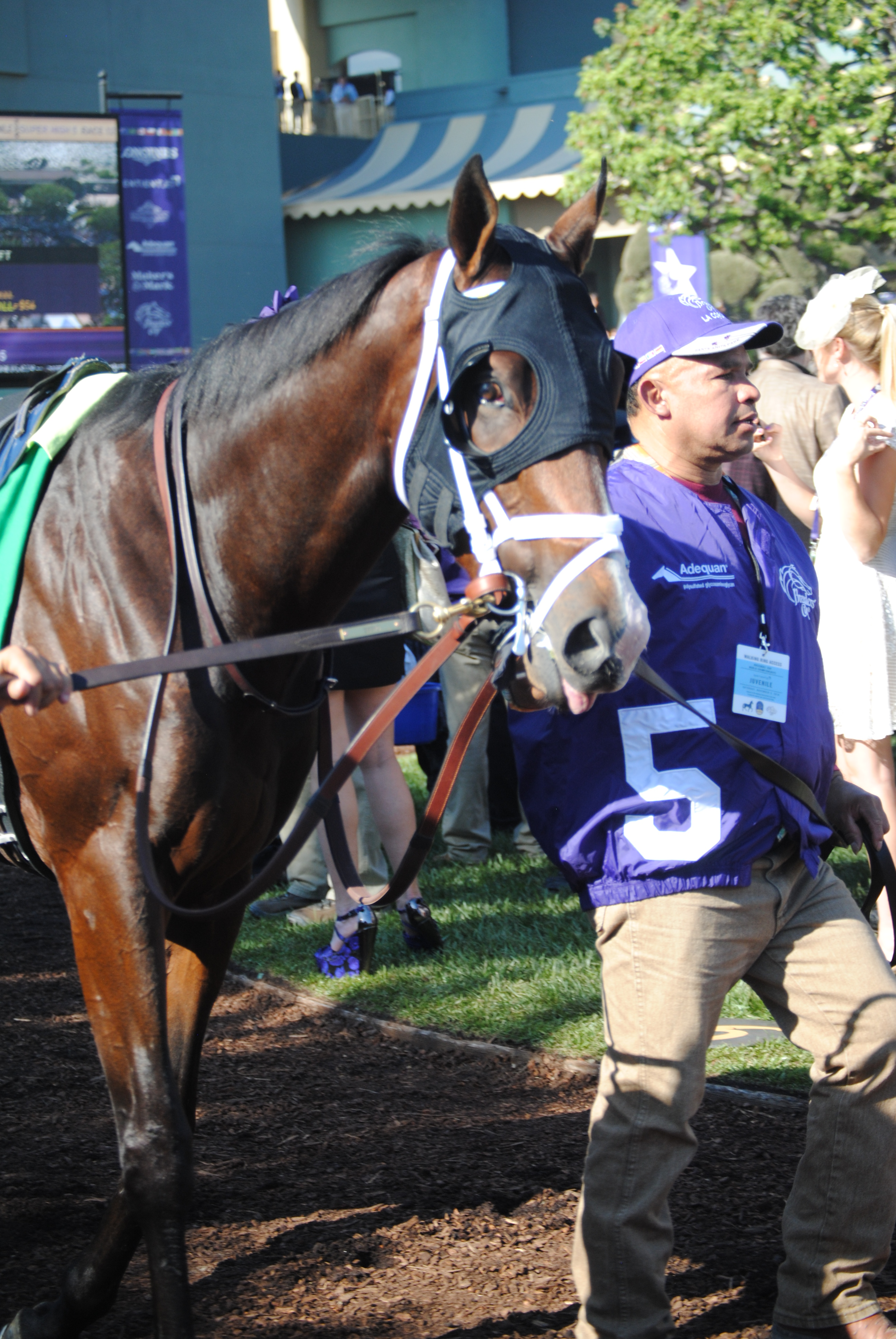
Classic Empire wearing blinkers for the Breeders' Cup Juvenile

His connections then announced that he would start in the Breeders' Futurity Stakes at Keeneland on October 10, where he would wear blinkers for the first time. Classic Empire was made the favorite, and Leparoux was back aboard. Classic Empire broke quickly and stalked the early front runners before making a strong move around the turn, pulling away to win by three lengths. After the win, Leparoux said; "Today he broke sharp and was all business. He ran a big race."

He's an extremely, extremely smart horse, and he tends to see things that maybe others don't, and you never know what he's going to do.

— Mark Casse

Classic Empire was then entered in the Breeders' Cup Juvenile on November 5, which was run at Santa Anita Park, in a race that was considered wide open. He was ridden by Leparoux again and was the second choice behind Not This Time, who had won the Iroquois Stakes by over eight lengths. The field also included Grade I winners Klimt (Del Mar Futurity), Gormley (FrontRunner Stakes), and Practical Joke (Hopeful Stakes and Champagne Stakes). Classic Empire broke cleanly and settled half a length behind Syndergaard, who set a fast pace, and continued to press the pace until the far turn, when he took the lead and pulled clear to lead by three lengths. As they entered the stretch, Classic Empire withstood a late charge from Not This Time, but he prevailed to win by a neck, with a time of 1:42.60. Practical Joke was more than seven lengths back in third. Casse said: "I have been doing this for 37 years and I thought his race in the Bashford Manor was as good as any two-year-old I've ever trained."

The close finish made Classic Empire and Not This Time the early co-favorites in the Kentucky Derby future wagering. Two weeks after the Breeders' Cup, it was announced that Not This Time would be retired due to an injury, which made Classic Empire the sole early Kentucky Derby favorite.

On January 21, 2017, Classic Empire was named the American Champion Two-Year-Old Male Horse of 2016, receiving all of the 248 votes. This made him one of three Eclipse Award winners that night to be named unanimously, along with California Chrome (Champion Older Dirt Horse), and Songbird (Champion Three-Year-Old Filly).

=== 2017: three-year-old season ===
Classic Empire began serious training at Palm Meadows Training Center in early January, with the February 4th Holy Bull Stakes being his early target. Classic Empire entered the race with a relatively short work tab, with only four workouts in a span of twenty days. He started as the 0.50 favorite in a field of seven, which also included Gunnevera and Irish War Cry. Classic Empire was noticeably washy before the race and was reluctant to load into the starting gate. He broke a step inward and moved up into third place on the first turn. He moved into second with strong urging from Leparoux but flattened out in the stretch to finish a non-threatening third, 5 lengths behind Gunnevera and 8 3/4 lengths behind Irish War Cry. Leparoux said of the race: "we got a good trip and every chance and he just didn't kick at the end."

Although Classic Empire seemed to come out of the race in good order, Casse subsequently discovered an abscess on the right front hoof. Casse noted that the problem most likely had been brewing for some time and wondered if it was the cause of his troubles in the Holy Bull. The abscess was slow to heal, and he missed his next planned start. Then, on the morning of March 3, he also refused to breeze, showing signs of discomfort in his back. Casse had an equine massage therapist brought in to examine and treat him. By March 5, he was showing no signs of soreness, but was tack-walked a few more days to be safe. Casse theorized that his back problem was caused by Classic Empire changing his gait because of his foot abscess, which led to the back issue, saying, "He's a work in progress. But the good news is we still have a lot of time and I wouldn't count us out yet."

Classic Empire's next goal was supposed to have been the Blue Grass Stakes on April 8, but on March 19 at Palm Meadows Training Center, he refused to break off and breeze, for no apparent reason. He was then shipped to Winding Oaks Farm, (Note: formerly known as Tartan Farm, where Dr Fager was born, raised, stood at stud, and is buried) near Ocala, Florida, to see if the change of scenery would help him. Classic Empire responded to the change very well, breezing five furlongs within the next few days.

After a workout on March 28 (5 furlongs in 59:3/5), it was announced that Classic Empire would target the April 15 Arkansas Derby. Winding Oaks Farm manager Phil Hronec was impressed with the work, stating: "It gave me goosebumps." In the race, he faced a field of 11 other three-year-olds, including undefeated Rebel Stakes winner Malagacy. Classic Empire stayed calm and relaxed throughout the post-parade, unlike before the Holy Bull, and loaded into the starting gate quietly. Starting from post 2, he bobbled slightly at the start, then moved up and had to be checked between two runners while passing the wire for the first time. He then raced keenly while running mid-pack, was stuck in traffic before the far turn, swung about six wide on the turn, and was fourth with about four lengths to make up entering the home stretch. He then unleashed a sustained rally, and, despite switching to the wrong lead near the wire, got up to beat Conquest Mo Money by half a length, with a time of 1:48.93. Leparoux stated: "today I knew I was loaded." Oxley commented that a new exercise rider, Martin Rivera, may have helped: "I think he was the wild card. The horse respected him, he trained so well with him and so here we are." The day after the race, Classic Empire appeared to be in great shape, with Casse saying: "I know what happened at Gulfstream was because of his foot abscess because he was an entirely different horse yesterday."

==== Kentucky Derby ====
Classic Empire was one of the favorites for the 2017 Kentucky Derby, held at Churchill Downs on May 6. The track was labelled as "Wet Fast (sealed)", with some standing water due to persistent rain over the course of several days. The start for several horses was poor, with Classic Empire being hit by McCraken, who was slammed into Classic Empire by Irish War Cry, who broke inwardly. More than a dozen lengths behind in 13th in the early part of the race, Classic Empire started closing ground around the far turn and into the stretch, only to be bumped again by McCraken. Classic Empire still finished fourth, 8 3/4 lengths behind winner Always Dreaming and 3/4 of a length behind third-place finisher Battle of Midway. "We got wiped out at the start", said trainer Mark Casse. "Classic Empire really got clobbered...Our horse ran extremely well, considering everything."

Classic Empire came out of the race with some superficial cuts and a swollen right eye; The day after the Derby, he was barely able to open it due to swelling. "I think if he ever showed how great he was, it was yesterday", said Casse. A few days after the Derby, Mark Casse announced that Classic Empire's eye was "100% better" but was being monitored hourly. He added that the horse had "about four or five abrasions, but none needed stitches.

==== Remainder of 2017 ====
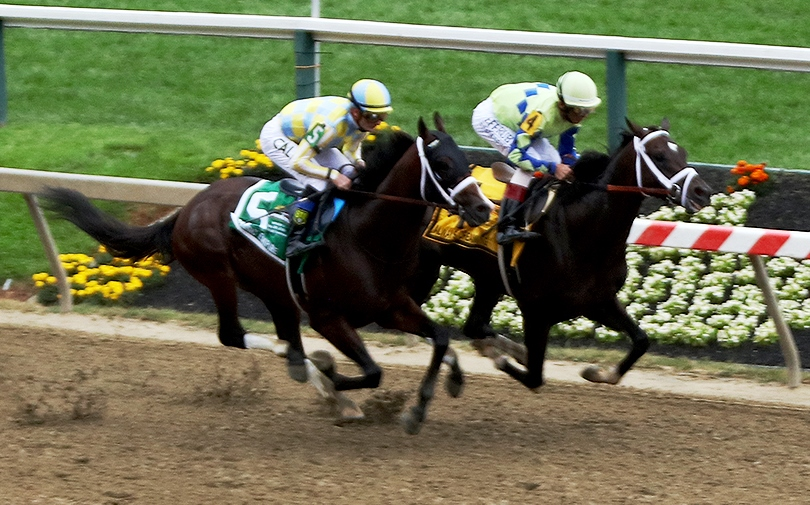
Classic Empire (5) next to Always Dreaming in the Preakness

Classic Empire went on to run in the 2017 Preakness Stakes at Pimlico Race Course on May 20. He drew post 5 in a 10-horse field and was the second choice in the betting at post time, going off at odds of 2.20. At the start, he bobbled slightly but went out to the lead, pressured the favorite, Always Dreaming, as they went through a moderately fast half mile of 46.81 seconds. Going into the far turn, Classic Empire began closing the gap, then moved past him to open a clear lead as they turned into the stretch. Classic Empire maintained his advantage until the final furlong, when Cloud Computing came up. Classic Empire battled back, but Cloud Computing surged by to win by a head, while Always Dreaming dropped back to finish eighth. "He ran his heart out and I'm just proud of him", said Mark Casse. Chad Brown, the trainer of Cloud Computing, praised Classic Empire after the race, stating: "I'm not going to dispute the fact that I brought in a fresh horse as part of our strategy. Classic Empire and Always Dreaming are two outstanding horses and our strategy was, if we were going to ever beat them, let's take them on two weeks' rest when we have six, and it worked." Casse also considered running him without blinkers in future races. "If I could do it all over again, the only thing I would do differently is I would take the blinkers off him. I'm not sure how much he saw Cloud Computing coming."

Oxley confirmed on May 23 that Classic Empire would point towards the Belmont Stakes as his next race. It was also announced that day that Classic Empire would stand at Ashford Stud in Kentucky upon his retirement from racing. Ashford Stud, part of the larger Coolmore racing and breeding organization, made one of "five or six" offers to Oxley in 2016. Oxley said "American Pharoah is there and he is by Pioneerof the Nile, as is Classic Empire, so I think it is a good fit there."

On June 7, it was announced that Classic Empire's hoof abscess had returned and that the colt would not start in the Belmont. His connections instead began preparing him for a summer campaign, with the Haskell Invitational as a possible next start. Classic Empire began conditioning but only had one unrecorded breeze before being sidelined again with his hoof and back bothering him. Mark Casse then said they would train up to the Travers Stakes. At Saratoga, Classic Empire was fine physically, but he was not enthusiastic about training, which Mark Casse attributed to the humidity.| His connections decided to skip the Travers and wait for the Pennsylvania Derby, where he would have more time to prepare and the weather would be cooler. After refusing to breeze on August 14, Classic Empire was sent back to Winding Oaks Farm to train, where his back problem, which was flaring up again, could be monitored daily by his veterinarian. Mark Casse then announced that Classic Empire would also skip the Pennsylvania Derby but stay in training with no particular race being targeted. Casse stated, "I'm not going to push it anymore... once we get him back in a regular routine, then we'll come up with a target."

==== Retirement ====
On October 18, 2017, it was announced that Classic Empire has been retired from racing. His foot abscess took longer to heal than initially expected, and the colt ran out of time to return to form for his intended year-end start, the Breeders' Cup Classic. "The problem is he had to come back at the top of his game to compete with the very best", Mark Casse said. "The foot took a lot longer to get right than I thought it would."

== Stud career ==
Classic Empire began stallion duties at Ashford Stud in 2018 for a stud fee of $35,000. On January 15, 2019, his first foal was born, a bay filly out of the Bernardini mare Sky My Sky bred by John Oxley.

=== Notable progeny ===
c = colt, f = filly, g = gelding

| Foaled | Name | Sex | Major wins |
| 2020 | Angel of Empire | c | Arkansas Derby |
| 2022 | Classic Q | f | Just A Game Stakes, First Lady Stakes |

== Race record ==
| Date | Track | Race | Grade | Distance | Finish | Margin | Time | Odds | Ref |
|---|---|---|---|---|---|---|---|---|---|
| 05/20/2017 | Pimlico Race Course | Preakness Stakes | I | 1 3/16 miles | 2nd | (Head) | 1:55.98 | 2.20 | |
| 05/06/2017 | Churchill Downs | Kentucky Derby | I | 1 1/4 miles | 4th | (8 3/4 lengths) | 2:03.59 | 6.80 | |
| 04/15/2017 | Oaklawn Park | Arkansas Derby | I | 1 1/8 miles | 1st | 1/2 length | 1:48.93 | *1.90 | |
| 02/04/2017 | Gulfstream Park | Holy Bull Stakes | II | 1 1/16 miles | 3rd | (8 3/4 lengths) | 1:42.52 | *0.50 | |
| 11/05/2016 | Santa Anita | Breeders' Cup Juvenile | I | 1 1/16 miles | 1st | Neck | 1:42.60 | 4.50 | |
| 10/08/2016 | Keeneland | Breeders' Futurity Stakes | I | 1 1/16 miles | 1st | 3 lengths | 1:43.41 | *1.60 | |
| 09/05/2016 | Saratoga | Hopeful Stakes | I | 7 furlongs | DNF | x | 1:23.39 | *1.65 | |
| 07/02/2016 | Churchill Downs | Bashford Manor Stakes | III | 6 furlongs | 1st | 3/4 lengths | 1:09.39 | 4.70 | |
| 05/04/2016 | Churchill Downs | Maiden Special Weight | x | 4 1/2 furlongs | 1st | 1 1/2 lengths | :52.68 | *0.50 | |

An asterisk before the odds means Classic Empire was the post-time favorite. DNF stands for Did Not Finish.

== Pedigree ==
Pedigree of Classic Empire, bay colt, March 21, 2014
| Sire Pioneerof the Nile 2006 | Empire Maker; 2000 | Unbridled | Fappiano |
| Sire Pioneerof the Nile 2006 | Empire Maker; 2000 | Unbridled | Gana Facil |
| Sire Pioneerof the Nile 2006 | Empire Maker; 2000 | Toussaud | El Gran Senor |
| Sire Pioneerof the Nile 2006 | Empire Maker; 2000 | Toussaud | Image Of Reality |
| Sire Pioneerof the Nile 2006 | Star Of Goshen; 1994 | Lord At War | General |
| Sire Pioneerof the Nile 2006 | Star Of Goshen; 1994 | Lord At War | Luna de Miel |
| Sire Pioneerof the Nile 2006 | Star Of Goshen; 1994 | Castle Eight | Key To The Kingdom |
| Sire Pioneerof the Nile 2006 | Star Of Goshen; 1994 | Castle Eight | Her Native |
| Dam Sambuca Classica 2004 | Cat Thief; 1996 | Storm Cat | Storm Bird |
| Dam Sambuca Classica 2004 | Cat Thief; 1996 | Storm Cat | Terlingua |
| Dam Sambuca Classica 2004 | Cat Thief; 1996 | Train Robbery | Alydar |
| Dam Sambuca Classica 2004 | Cat Thief; 1996 | Train Robbery | Track Robbery |
| Dam Sambuca Classica 2004 | In Her Glory; 1990 | Miswaki | Mr. Prospector |
| Dam Sambuca Classica 2004 | In Her Glory; 1990 | Miswaki | Hopespringseternal |
| Dam Sambuca Classica 2004 | In Her Glory; 1990 | Forever Waving | Hoist The Flag |
| Dam Sambuca Classica 2004 | In Her Glory; 1990 | Forever Waving | Quillesian (family 4-m) |

Classic Empire is inbred 5 x 4 to Mr. Prospector, meaning Mr. Prospector appears once in the fifth generation as the sire of Fappiano and once in the fourth generation of Classic Empire's pedigree. He is also inbred 5 x 5 to Raise a Native, and 5 x 5 to Northern Dancer.
