= Practical Move =

American-bred Thoroughbred racehorse

- Sire: Practical Joke
- Grandsire: Into Mischief
- Dam: Ack Naughty
- Damsire: Afleet Alex
- Sex: Colt
- Foaled: April 30, 2020
- Died: October 31, 2023 (aged 3); Santa Anita Park, Arcadia, California, U.S.
- Country: United States
- Color: Bay
- Breeder: Chad C. Brown & Head of Plains Partners
- Owner: Pierre Jean & Leslie A. Amestoy & Roger K. Beasley
- Trainer: Tim Yakteen
- Record: 8: 5-1-2
- Earnings: $923,200

Major wins
- Los Alamitos Futurity (2022); San Felipe Stakes (2023); Santa Anita Derby (2023)
- Last updated on 31 October 2023

Practical Move (April 30, 2020 – October 31, 2023) was an American Thoroughbred racehorse who won the Grade I Santa Anita Derby and Grade II San Felipe Stakes at Santa Anita Park in 2023 as a three-year-old.

== Background ==
Practical Move was a bay colt that was bred in Kentucky by Chad C. Brown & Head of Plains Partners. He was sired by Practical Joke, winner of the 2016 Grade I Champagne Stakes at Belmont Park. Trainer Chad Brown also trained Practical Joke. Out of the Afleet Alex mare Ack Naughty, Practical Move was a $90,000 (Reserve Not Attained) at the 2021 Keeneland September Yearling Sale before Eisaman Equine consigned him at Ocala Breeders' Sale. Pierre Jean & Leslie A. Amestoy bought Practical Move for $230,000 at the 2022 Ocala Breeders' Sales Spring Sale of two-year-olds in Training.

Practical Joke stands at Ashford Stud in Versailles, Kentucky for $25,000 in 2023. Through 2023 Practical Joke is the sire of 20 black-type stakes winners.

Practical Move was trained by Tim Yakteen.

== Racing career ==
=== 2022: two-year-old season ===
Practical Move ran five times in 2022 for two wins including the GII Los Alamitos Futurity at Los Alamitos Race Course.

=== 2023: three-year-old season ===
Practical Move has run twice for two victories and easily qualified for the 2023 Kentucky Derby winning major qualification events on the Road to the Kentucky Derby, the Grade II San Felipe Stakes and then the Grade I Santa Anita Derby by a nose.

Practical Move was drawn in the 2023 Kentucky Derby, but two days before the race trainer Tim Yakteen scratched the horse after he spiked a temperature. This allowed the Dale Romans-trained Cyclone Mischief to draw in from the also-eligible list.

== Death ==
Practical Move collapsed and died at Santa Anita Park in preparation for the Breeders' Cup Dirt Mile on October 31, 2023. He was three years old. The horse's preliminary cause of death is a heart attack.

== Statistics ==
Date	Distance	Race	Grade	Track	Odds	Field	Finish	Winning Time	Winning (Losing) Margin	Jockey	Ref
2022 – Two-year-old season
Aug 13, 2022	6 1/2 furlongs	Maiden Special Weight		Del Mar	24.60	9	2	1:15.81	(6 lengths)	Drayden Van Dyke	
Sep 3, 2022	6 1/2 furlongs	Maiden Special Weight		Del Mar	3.80	10	3	1:16.62	(3 3/4 lengths)	Drayden Van Dyke	
Oct 10, 2022	1 mile	Maiden Special Weight		Santa Anita	2.20	9	1 (Note: Practical Move finished second in the event to Fort Bragg who was disqualified and placed second for lugging out into the path of Practical Move at the top of the lane then lugging in and making contact midstretch)	1:38.82	(1 1/2 lengths)	Drayden Van Dyke	
Nov 20, 2022	7 furlongs	Bob Hope Stakes	III	Del Mar	9.30	5	3	1:21.68	(3 3/4 lengths)	Drayden Van Dyke	
Dec 17, 2022	1 1/16 miles	Los Alamitos Futurity	II	Los Alamitos	10.60	5	1	1:41.65	3 1/4 lengths	Ramon Vazquez	
2023 – Three-year-old season
Mar 4, 2023	1 1/16 miles	San Felipe Stakes	II	Santa Anita	4.20	9	1	1:42.01	2 1/2 lengths	Ramon Vazquez	
Apr 8, 2023	1 1/8 miles	Santa Anita Derby	I	Santa Anita	1.00*	8	1	1:48.69	nose	Ramon Vazquez	
Oct 6, 2023	1 mile	Allowance Optional Claiming		Santa Anita	0.40*	4	1	1:35.14	4 lengths	Ramon Vazquez	

Notes:
An (*) asterisk after the odds means Practical Move was the post-time favorite.

== Pedigree ==
Pedigree of Practical Move, Bay colt, April 30, 2020
Sire Practical Joke (2004)	Into Mischief (2005)	Harlan's Holiday (1999)	Harlan (1989)
Sire Practical Joke (2004)	Into Mischief (2005)	Harlan's Holiday (1999)	Christmas In Aiken (1993)
Sire Practical Joke (2004)	Into Mischief (2005)	Leslie's Lady (1996)	Tricky Creek (1986)
Sire Practical Joke (2004)	Into Mischief (2005)	Leslie's Lady (1996)	Crystal Lady (CAN) (1990)
Sire Practical Joke (2004)	Halo Humor (2003)	Distorted Humor (1993)	Forty Niner (1985)
Sire Practical Joke (2004)	Halo Humor (2003)	Distorted Humor (1993)	Danzig's Beauty (1987)
Sire Practical Joke (2004)	Halo Humor (2003)	Gilded Halo (1996)	Gilded Time (1990)
Sire Practical Joke (2004)	Halo Humor (2003)	Gilded Halo (1996)	Careless Halo (1989)
Dam Ack Naughty (2012)	Afleet Alex (2002)	Northern Afleet (1993)	Afleet (CAN) (1984)
Dam Ack Naughty (2012)	Afleet Alex (2002)	Northern Afleet (1993)	Nuryette (1986)
Dam Ack Naughty (2012)	Afleet Alex (2002)	Maggy Hawk (1994)	Hawkster (1986)
Dam Ack Naughty (2012)	Afleet Alex (2002)	Maggy Hawk (1994)	Qualique (1981)
Dam Ack Naughty (2012)	Dash for Money (2000)	General Meeting (1988)	Seattle Slew (1974)
Dam Ack Naughty (2012)	Dash for Money (2000)	General Meeting (1988)	Alydar's Promise (1983)
Dam Ack Naughty (2012)	Dash for Money (2000)	Hot Lear (1995)	Lear Fan (1981)
Dam Ack Naughty (2012)	Dash for Money (2000)	Hot Lear (1995)	Medicine Woman (1985) (family 2f)
