= Sambuca Classica =

American-bred Thoroughbred racehorse

- Sire: Cat Thief
- Grandsire: Storm Cat
- Dam: In Her Glory
- Damsire: Miswaki
- Sex: Mare
- Foaled: February 21, 2004
- Country: United States
- Color: Chestnut
- Breeder: Anstu Farm
- Owner: Steven and Brandi Nicholson
- Trainer: Justin Nixon
- Record: 8: 0–0–3
- Earnings: $13,896
- Last updated on 8/21/18

Sambuca Classica (foaled February 21, 2004, in New York) is a Thoroughbred mare best known as the dam of 2016 Champion Two-Year-Old Colt Classic Empire. She was an unsuccessful race mare, not winning in eight career starts and even starting once in a Maiden Claiming, but has proven to be more successful as a broodmare, with all five of her foals to race to date being winners.

== Background ==
Sambuca Classica is a small chestnut mare with a star, strip, a sock on her right front and left rear leg, and a coronet mark on her right rear. She was raced by her breeders, Anstu Farm, for her three career starts in 2006, with her best finish being fourth-place. She was purchased by Steven and Brandi Nicholson, but did not race again until August of her three-year-old season. She failed to finish higher than third-place in her five subsequent starts. She was retired in 2008 to become a broodmare.

== Progeny Record ==
- 2009: Song Girl, a bay filly by Songandaprayer. She won 3 of 13 races for earnings of $84,644, with her best win being a Starter Allowance.
- 2010: Anytime Magic, a chestnut gelding by Fusaichi Pegasus. He won 15 of 64 races for earnings of $202,945, with wins in the Lost in the Fog Stakes and the Everett Nevin Stakes at two.
- 2011: bred to Afleet Alex but did not produce a foal.
- 2012: bred to Warrior's Reward but did not produce a foal.
- 2013: Uptown Twirl, a bay filly by Twirling Candy. She won 4 of 9 races for earnings of $170,714, with wins in the Surfside Stakes and the Pleasanton Oaks at three.
- 2014: Classic Empire, a bay colt by Pioneerof the Nile. He won 5 of 9 races for earnings of $2,520,220, with wins in the Bashford Manor Stakes, Breeders' Futurity Stakes, and Breeders' Cup Juvenile at two, and was named Champion Two-Year-Old Colt. He won the Arkansas Derby and finished second in the Preakness Stakes at three.
- 2015: Exclamation Point, a chestnut colt by Concord Point. He has won 3 of 4 races so far in his career.
- 2016: aborted foal by Uncle Mo.
- 2017: Classic Girl, a chestnut filly by Candy Ride. Two starts.
- 2018: Harvard, a bay colt by Pioneerof the Nile. Winner of two events.
- 2019: bred to Pioneerof the Nile but did not produce a foal.
- 2020: bred to Justify.

== Pedigree ==
Pedigree of Sambuca Clasica, chestnut mare, February 21, 2004
Sire Cat Thief 1996	Storm Cat; 1983	Storm Bird	Northern Dancer
Sire Cat Thief 1996	Storm Cat; 1983	Storm Bird	South Ocean
Sire Cat Thief 1996	Storm Cat; 1983	Terlingua	Secretariat
Sire Cat Thief 1996	Storm Cat; 1983	Terlingua	Crimson Saint
Sire Cat Thief 1996	Train Robbery; 1987	Alydar	Raise a Native
Sire Cat Thief 1996	Train Robbery; 1987	Alydar	Sweet Tooth
Sire Cat Thief 1996	Train Robbery; 1987	Track Robbery	No Robbery
Sire Cat Thief 1996	Train Robbery; 1987	Track Robbery	Left at Home
Dam In Her Glory 1990	Miswaki; 1978	Mr. Prospector	Raise a Native
Dam In Her Glory 1990	Miswaki; 1978	Mr. Prospector	Gold Digger
Dam In Her Glory 1990	Miswaki; 1978	Hopespringseternal	Buckpasser
Dam In Her Glory 1990	Miswaki; 1978	Hopespringseternal	Rose Bower
Dam In Her Glory 1990	Forever Waving; 1980	Hoist The Flag	Tom Rolfe
Dam In Her Glory 1990	Forever Waving; 1980	Hoist The Flag	Wavy Navy
Dam In Her Glory 1990	Forever Waving; 1980	Quillesian	Princequillo
Dam In Her Glory 1990	Forever Waving; 1980	Quillesian	Alanesian (family 4-m)
