= 2023 Kentucky Derby =

Horse race

149th Kentucky Derby
- Kentucky Derby
- Grade I stakes race
- Location: Churchill Downs; Louisville, Kentucky, United States
- Date: May 6, 2023
- Distance: 1 1/4 mi (10 furlongs; 2,012 m)
- Winning horse: Mage
- Winning time: 2:01.57
- Final odds: 15–1
- Jockey: Javier Castellano
- Trainer: Gustavo Delgado
- Owner: OGMA Investments, Ramiro Restrepo, Sterling Racing and Commonwealth Thoroughbreds
- Conditions: Fast
- Surface: Dirt
- Attendance: 150,335

The 2023 Kentucky Derby (branded as the 149th Running of the Kentucky Derby presented by Woodford Reserve for sponsorship reasons) was the 149th running of the Kentucky Derby. It took place on May 6, 2023, the first Saturday in May, in Louisville, Kentucky. The race was open to 20 horses, who qualified for the race by earning points on the 2023 Road to the Kentucky Derby. The Kentucky Derby is a Grade I stakes race at a distance of 1 1/4 miles (2.0 km) and has been run at Churchill Downs racetrack since its inception in 1875. The purse for 2023 was US$3 million. The race was won by Mage.

The race was broadcast by NBC, with coverage of undercard races beginning at 10:30 am EDT on USA Network and main network coverage of pre-race activities starting at 12:30 pm EDT. It was also livestreamed on NBCSports.com. According to The Blood-Horse, NBC's broadcast "averaged a Total Audience Delivery (TAD) of 14.8 million viewers—making it the most-watched sporting event and second most watched show (behind only the Academy Awards) since Super Bowl LVII in February."

During the week of the 2023 Derby, seven horses died at Churchill Downs, including two who were euthanized prior to the signature race on Saturday.

== Qualification ==
The field is limited to twenty horses who qualify based on points earned in the 2023 Road to the Kentucky Derby, a series of designated races that was first introduced in 2013. This point system replaced the previous graded stakes race earnings system. The Main Road consists mostly of races in North America and one in Dubai, the Japan Road consists of four races in Japan, and the European Road consists of seven races in Great Britain, Ireland and France.

== Entries ==
The draw for the event was held at Churchill Downs at 2:00 p.m. on May 1, 2023. Forte was installed as the 3-to-1 favorite and drew post number 15.

Three horses were withdrawn from the Derby two days before the race. On May 4, trainer Tim Yakteen withdrew Practical Move after the horse developed a fever, which allowed the Dale Romans-trained Cyclone Mischief to qualify from the also-eligible list. Later that day, Wood Memorial winner Lord Miles was withdrawn by order of the Kentucky Horse Racing Commission, which announced that all horses trained by Saffie Joseph Jr. could not race until further notice after two of them collapsed and died following races run at Churchill on April 29 and May 2. The withdrawal of Lord Miles allowed Japanese horse Mandarin Hero to take part in the race. The third and final also-eligible, the Ron Moquett-trained King Russell, qualified for the Derby on the evening of May 4 after another Japanese contender, Continuar, was withdrawn by trainer Yoshito Yahagi. On the day before the Derby, John Shirreffs withdrew Skinner after that horse developed a temperature. On May 6, just hours before the Derby was scheduled to start, Forte was withdrawn from the race. Mike Repole, the co-owner of Forte, cited the cause as a bruised right foot.

== Horse deaths ==
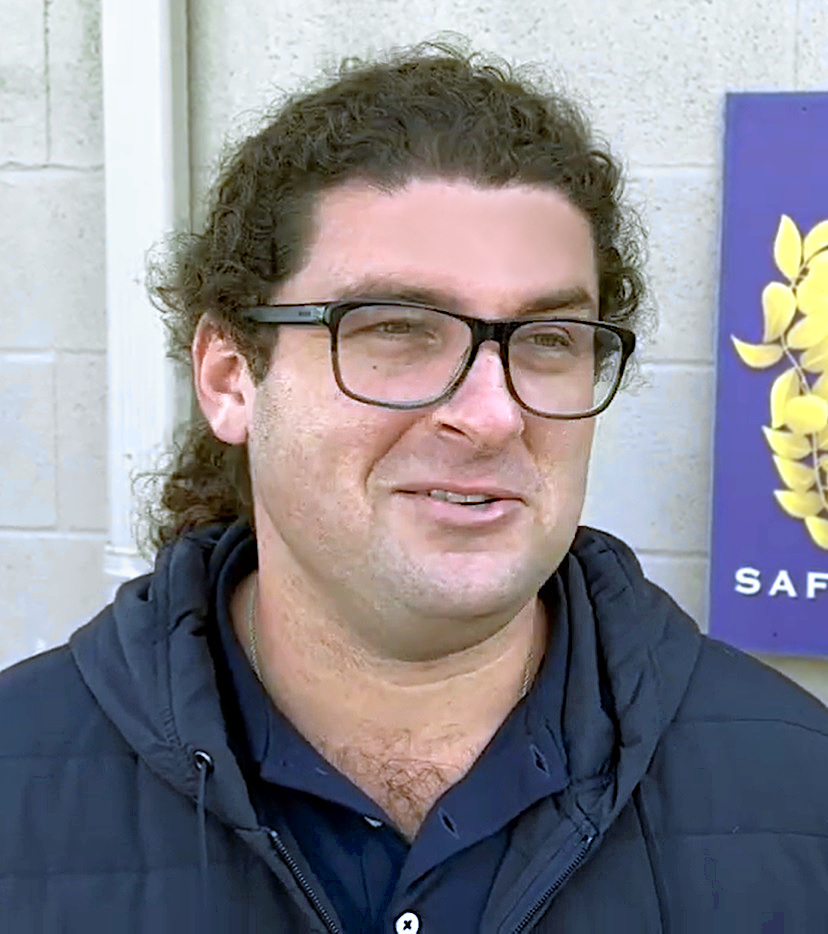
Saffie Joseph Jr. in 2022

Seven horses died at Churchill Downs during the week of the Kentucky Derby, including two horses that died in undercard races on the day of the Derby. Wild on Ice, a Derby contender, was hurt while training on April 27 and was euthanized. On April 29, Code of Kings died after flipping and breaking his neck. Take Charge Briana was injured in a race on May 2 and was euthanized. On May 4, trainer Saffie Joseph Jr. was suspended indefinitely by Churchill Downs after two of his horses, Parents Pride and Chasing Artie, died. Parents Pride suddenly died on April 29 and Chasing Artie collapsed and died following a race on May 2. Following a two-month investigation, Joseph was reinstated on June 30.

Chloe's Dream and Freezing Point were euthanized on May 6 after being injured in undercard races. Chloe's Dream injured his right front knee in the second race and went into an equine ambulance; he was euthanized after. In the eighth race, Freezing Point was injured after being bumped in the backstretch and went into an equine ambulance. His injured left front ankle was reportedly put in a splint, but he was eventually euthanized.

== Result ==
Mage won by a length with a time of 2:01.57. Initially, he broke slowly and was near the back of the pack. Verifying, Kingsbarns and Reincarnate set a fast pace with fractions of :22.35, :45.73 and 1:10.11. Mage was in sixth place by the mile marker. He charged to the outside of Two Phil's, overtook Two Phil's down the stretch and held off Two Phil's and Angel of Empire for the win.

Mage had only one win before the Kentucky Derby. Mage became the fourth horse to win the Kentucky Derby after having only three previous starts, joining Justify, Big Brown and Regret. He also became the fourth horse to win the Kentucky Derby without racing as a two-year old, joining Justify and Apollo. It is the first Kentucky Derby win for jockey Javier Castellano and trainer Gustavo Delgado.

Mage is owned by OGMA Investments, Ramiro Restrepo, Sterling Racing and Commonwealth Thoroughbreds, a micro-shares company that sells shares to back the career of an athlete or horse. They banded together after Restrepo and Delgado bought Mage for $290,000, which was above their initial budget.

Finish	Program Numbers	Horse	Qualifying Points	Trainer	Jockey	Morning Line Odds	Final Odds	Margin (Lengths)	Winnings
1	8	Mage	50	Gustavo Delgado	Javier Castellano	15-1	15.21		$1,860,000
2	3	Two Phil's	123	Larry Rivelli	Jareth Loveberry	12-1	9.87	1	$600,000
3	14	Angel of Empire	154	Brad H. Cox	Flavien Prat	8-1	4.06	1 1/2	$300,000
4	11	Disarm	46	Steven M. Asmussen	Joel Rosario	30-1	27.12	4 1/2	$150,000
5	1	Hit Show	60	Brad H. Cox	Manuel Franco	30-1	24.02	6 1/2	$90,000
6	17	Derma Sotogake (JPN)	100	Hidetaka Otonashi	Christophe Lemaire	10-1	7.80	8	
7	5	Tapit Trice	150	Todd A. Pletcher	Luis Saez	5-1	4.53	9 1/4	
8	16	Raise Cain	64	Ben Colbrook	Gerardo Corrales	50-1	33.04	10	
9	18	Rocket Can	60	William I. Mott	Junior Alvarado	15-1	28.81	11	
10	4	Confidence Game	57	J. Keith Desormeaux	James Graham	20-1	21.03	14 1/2	
11	13	Sun Thunder	54	Kenneth G. McPeek	Brian Hernandez Jr.	50-1	33.06	16 3/4	
12	22	Mandarin Hero (JPN)	40	Terunobu Fujita	Kazushi Kimura	20-1	17.47	20 1/2	
13	7	Reincarnate	45	Tim Yakteen	John Velazquez	50-1	14.76	24 1/2	
14	6	Kingsbarns	100	Todd A. Pletcher	José Ortiz	12-1	11.72	25 1/4	
15	23	King Russell	40	Ron Moquett	Rafael Bejarano	50-1	32.27	25 1/2	
16	2	Verifying	54	Brad H. Cox	Tyler Gaffalione	15-1	14.30	54 3/4	
17	12	Jace's Road	45	Brad H. Cox	Florent Geroux	15-1	33.47	55 1/4	
18	21	Cyclone Mischief	45	Dale L. Romans	Irad Ortiz Jr. (Note: Irad Ortiz Jr. was supposed to ride Forte, but after Forte was scratched, Ortiz was named as the rider of Cyclone Mischief)	30-1	29.02	55 1/2	
Scratched	9	Skinner (Note: Skinner was scratched after spiking a temperature)	45	John Shirreffs	Juan Hernandez	20-1			
Scratched	10	Practical Move (Note: Practical Move was scratched after having an elevated temperature on May 4)	160	Tim Yakteen	Ramon Vasquez	10-1			
Scratched	15	Forte (Note: Derby favorite Forte was scratched after regulatory veterinarian concerns related to a mending foot bruise in his right front leg)	190	Todd A. Pletcher	Irad Ortiz Jr.	3-1			
Scratched	19	Lord Miles (Note: Lord Miles was scratched by order of the Kentucky Horse Racing Commission)	104	Saffie Joseph Jr.	Paco Lopez	30-1			
Scratched	20	Continuar (JPN) (Note: Continuar was scratched by trainer Yoshito Yahagi, who said that the horse did not reach peak fitness for the race)	30	Yoshito Yahagi	Ryusei Sakai	50-1			

Track condition: fast

Times: 1/4 mile – 22.35; 1/2 mile – 45.73; 3/4 mile – 1:10.11; mile – 1:36.06; final – 2:01.57.
Splits for each quarter-mile: (22.35) (23:38) (24:38) (25:95) (25:51)

Source: Equibase chart

=== Payouts ===
The table below provides the Kentucky Derby payout schedule for a $2 stake.

Program number	Horse name	Win	Place	Show
8	Mage	$32.42	$14.58	$9.08
3	Two Phil's	—	$10.44	$6.52
14	Angel of Empire	—	—	$4.70

- $2 exacta (8–3): $330.44
- $0.50 trifecta (8–3–14): $491.18
- $1 superfecta (8–3–14–11): $15,643.65
- $1 Super High Five (8–3–14–11–1): $194,923.09

== Notes ==
Preceded by 2022 Belmont Stakes	Triple Crown	Succeeded by 2023 Preakness Stakes
