= Forte (horse) =

American-bred Thoroughbred racehorse

- Sire: Violence
- Grandsire: Medaglia d'Oro
- Dam: Queen Caroline
- Damsire: Blame
- Sex: Stallion
- Foaled: February 3, 2020 (age 6)
- Country: United States
- Color: Dark Bay or Brown
- Breeder: South Gate Farm
- Owner: Repole Stable & St. Elias Stable
- Trainer: Todd A. Pletcher
- Record: 10: 7–1–0
- Earnings: $3,029,830

Major wins
- Breeders' Futurity (2022); Hopeful Stakes (2022); Fountain of Youth Stakes (2023); Florida Derby (2023); Jim Dandy Stakes (2023); Breeders' Cup; Breeders' Cup Juvenile (2022)

Awards
- American Champion Two-Year-Old Male Horse (2022)
- Last updated on 26 August 2023

Forte (foaled February 3, 2020) is a retired champion American Thoroughbred racehorse. As a two-year-old, he won the Grade I Hopeful Stakes, Breeders' Futurity and Breeders' Cup Juvenile en route to being named champion juvenile of 2022. At the age of three, he won the Florida Derby and Jim Dandy Stakes.

== Background ==
Forte is a dark bay or brown colt that was bred in Clarke County, Virginia by South Gate Farm. He was sired by Violence, winner of the 2012 Grade I CashCall Futurity at Hollywood Park. Forte is from the sixth Northern Hemisphere crop sired by Violence and is his 28th stakes winner, and follows Dr. Schivel, No Parole, and Volatile as his fourth Grade 1 winner. Violence stands at Hill 'n' Dale Farms for $25,000 in 2022.

Forte is out of the Blame mare Queen Caroline, winner of four black-type events on the turf, including the 2016 Indiana Grand Stakes with $401,608 stakes earned in a 20 race career. She is out of a daughter of Forestry, Queens Plaza, winner of the 2004 Sorority Stakes at Monmouth Park. Fourth dam Jeano is out of the 1985 Grade 1 Delaware Handicap winner Basie, whose dam, Stolen Base, also appears as third dam of Champion Smarty Jones. Stolen Base is from a branch of the La Troienne family. Forte was sold originally as a weanling for $80,000 at the 2020 Keeneland November Sale to Silver Hill Farm. Later Forte was sold for $110,000 from the Eaton Sales consignment at the 2021 Keeneland September Yearling Sale to Mike Repole's Repole Stable and Vincent Viola of St. Elias Stable. Forte is trained by U.S. Racing Hall of Fame trainer Todd Pletcher.

== Racing career ==
=== 2022: two-year-old season ===
Forte began his career on May 27 at Belmont Park in a Maiden Special Weight event for two-year-olds over a distance of five furlongs in a field of 5, of which four were first-starters. He started as the 1/5 odds-on favorite and settled from the start, chasing leaders Wasabi Boy and Gotta Like Him. Jockey Irad Ortiz Jr. moved Forte inside into the two path early on the turn, then angled four wide at the five-sixteenths marker. He moved to the lead in the upper stretch, then moved in some while passing Wasabi Boy, powering away under strong urging to win by 7 3/4 lengths in 58.21 seconds.

Forte's next start was on July 16 in the Grade III Sanford Stakes at Saratoga Race Course over a distance of six furlongs. The event attracted twelve starters of which eleven had won their last start with Forte starting the 7/5 favorite. He settled off the pace, was roused three wide on the turn and into upper stretch under a drive by Irad Ortiz Jr., lacked the needed response, and finished fourth to Mo Strike, beaten by nearly six lengths.

His next start came in the Grade I Hopeful Stakes at Saratoga on Labor Day weekend. On a rainy day that created a sloppy track, Forte started as the 13/2 fourth choice and was unhurried early as Gulfport and Mo Strike pushed the lead. Approaching the eighth pole, Forte grabbed the lead and pulled away, winning by three lengths while covering the seven furlongs in 1:22.58. He was later disqualified due to a finding of the drug meloxicam in a post-race test, which was a medication violation under then-New York State rules. Forte's connections appealed the decision, saying that Forte was never administered or prescribed the drug, adding that it had been prescribed to Forte's co-owner Vinnie Viola. In December 2023 the New York State Gaming Commission unanimously accepted a hearing officer's recommendation that the disqualification be upheld. Mike Repole said after the decision that he intended to appeal the ruling through the New York State Court System, and later that month a temporary restraining order against the ruling was issued pending the outcome of litigation.

Forte's connections opted to pass the Grade I Champagne Stakes for the Grade I Breeders' Futurity at Keeneland, which was scheduled a week later. The connections later stated that Forte's drug test result from the Hopeful was returned the day that entries for the Champagne were taken, which prevented Forte from entering the Champagne. In the Breeders' Futurity, Forte was again unhurried in the early stages, settling in seventh place in a field of fourteen behind the 3/2 favorite, Loggins. Forte tipped four-wide on the turn, moving into contention at the quarter pole. He moved his head in front of Loggins with two furlongs left to run, and the colts battled the length of the stretch. At the wire, Forte was the narrow victor in a time of 1:44.74 on a fast main track. Both runners made contact down the stretch, with the winner placing the runner-up in tight quarters with about a sixteenth of a mile remaining. A long inquiry ensued, though the stewards ultimately made no change to the order of finish. By winning the Breeders' Futurity, Forte qualified to the Breeders' Cup since the event is a "Win and You're In" race for the GI Breeders' Cup Juvenile.

=== 2023: three-year-old season ===
Forte's first start as a three-year-old was in the Grade II Fountain of Youth Stakes at Gulfstream Park. Starting as the 1/2 odds-on favorite, he won by 4 1/2 lengths in a time of 1:43.12 for the 1 1/16 miles contest. Forte solidified his place in the Road to the Kentucky Derby with an additional 50 qualification points and confirmed his early favoritism for the main event.

His next start was in the Florida Derby. He was sent off at odds of 1-5 from post 11–a disadvantageous starting position at Gulfstream's 1 1/8-mile distance. Entering the final turn five wide, Forte closed and passed eventual Kentucky Derby winner Mage in deep stretch to win by one length. The victory earned Forte 100 qualification points, moving him to the top of the Kentucky Derby leaderboard with 190 points. The final time of the race was 1:49.37, which had been corrected by Equibase from the original time of 1:48.51.

Forte was installed as the 3-1 favorite for the Kentucky Derby, but on the morning of the race he was scratched by a veterinarian representing the Kentucky Horse Racing Commission (KHRC). Mike Repole, the co-owner of Forte, cited the cause of the scratch as a bruised right foot. Forte galloped around the Churchill Downs track two days after the Derby was run, with Todd Pletcher indicating that the colt appeared to have recovered from the foot bruise. Pletcher had planned to work Forte at the end of that week and then ship the horse to Baltimore to run in the Preakness Stakes. However, later that day the KHRC announced that Forte would be placed on the vet's list for 14 days pursuant to state and federal (Horseracing Integrity and Safety Authority) rules, after which he would be required to complete a satisfactory workout and pass a blood test. The action effectively took Forte out of consideration for the Preakness.

On the same day that Forte was placed on the KHRC vet's list, The New York Times reported that the horse failed a post-race drug test following his victory in the 2022 Hopeful Stakes. A formal hearing on the matter was held on May 10. According to a spokesperson for the New York State Gaming Commission, the hearing was delayed repeatedly at the request of counsel representing trainer Todd Pletcher and because of difficulties obtaining split-sample drug test results. On May 11, Pletcher's legal team told media outlets, including Daily Racing Form, that New York stewards had disqualified Forte from his win in the Hopeful for the post-race presence of meloxicam. Additionally, Pletcher was issued a 10-day suspension and fined $1,000. The connections of Forte appealed the ruling, with Pletcher's legal team disputing statements made by the State Gaming Commission about the delays in the proceedings. Co-owner Mike Repole said that he would file a lawsuit if the disqualification was not overturned, saying that the regulatory action "defines epic incompetence." He was also considering legal action against the Times for reporting the positive test as "doping." In June 2026 Pletcher's appeal was denied by the Appellate Division of the New York Supreme Court, and he served the 10-day suspension.

On May 21, Pletcher worked Forte on the Belmont Park training track. Following the workout, Repole said that the colt would be pointed to the Belmont Stakes on June 10. Forte got up to finish second after running five wide on the far turn and entering the stretch seven wide. Pletcher said that it was a "tough six weeks," referring to Forte's scratch from the Kentucky Derby, but said that he was proud of how the horse ran in the Belmont.

Forte was then pointed to a summer campaign beginning with the Jim Dandy Stakes at Saratoga, a stakes race that is the local prep for the Travers Stakes. Starting from post two in a short field of five, the 3-4 favorite sat third behind Saudi Crown and Angel of Empire for much of the race before closing in the stretch to nip Saudi Crown by a nose at the wire. There was an inquiry by the stewards into the stretch run investigating contact among the top finishers, but the results were allowed to stand. Forte then went to the Travers and finished fourth as the 8-5 favorite, beaten eight lengths by Belmont Stakes winner Arcangelo. Repole said that Forte didn't have his usual powerful stretch run, noting that he was in the spot Repole wanted him to be in but that he "just kind of leveled off."

==== Retirement ====
In October 2023, Forte was in training in Kentucky for a possible start in the Breeders' Cup Classic. It was disclosed that he was recovering from a quarter crack in his left front foot, which was patched up prior to galloping at Churchill Downs on October 1. At the time, Pletcher was optimistic that Forte would still have time to get to the race if things continued to go smoothly.

On October 19, 2023, following a gallop at Keeneland, Mike Repole announced Forte's retirement. He elaborated that the horse had developed the hoof crack after running in the Travers and said that trainer Todd Pletcher told him they had "run out of time" to prepare for the Breeders' Cup. Forte will enter stud in 2024 at Spendthrift Farm in Kentucky for a fee of $50,000.

The first foal by Forte, a bay filly out of the Collected mare's Gravy, was born on January 8 at Darby Dan Farm near Lexington, Kentucky.

== Statistics ==
Date	Distance	Race	Grade	Track	Odds	Field	Finish	Winning Time	Winning (Losing) Margin	Jockey	Ref
2022 – Two-year-old season
May 27, 2022	5 furlongs	Maiden Special Weight		Belmont Park	0.20*	5	1	0:58.21	7 3/4 lengths	Irad Ortiz Jr.	
Jul 16, 2022	6 furlongs	Sanford Stakes	III	Saratoga	1.45*	12	4	1:11.35	(5 3/4 lengths)	Irad Ortiz Jr.	
Sep 5, 2022	7 furlongs	Hopeful Stakes	I	Saratoga	6.90	6	1 (Note: Forte was disqualified from his win in the Hopeful Stakes due to a medication violation. The connections are appealing through the New York State Courts. As of the latest ruling in December 2023, Equibase still lists Forte as the winner.)	1:22.58	3 lengths	Irad Ortiz Jr.	
Oct 8, 2022	1 1/16 miles	Breeders' Futurity	I	Keeneland	4.43	14	1	1:44.74	neck	Irad Ortiz Jr.	
Nov 4, 2022	1 1/16 miles	Breeders' Cup Juvenile	I	Keeneland	5.02	10	1	1:43.06	1 1/2 lengths	Irad Ortiz Jr.	
2023 – Three-year-old season
Mar 4, 2023	1 1/16 miles	Fountain of Youth Stakes	II	Gulfstream Park	0.50*	9	1	1:43.12	4 1/2 lengths	Irad Ortiz Jr.	
Apr 1, 2023	1 1/8 miles	Florida Derby	I	Gulfstream Park	0.30*	12	1	1:49.37	1 length	Irad Ortiz Jr.	
Jun 10, 2023	1 1/2 miles	Belmont Stakes	I	Belmont Park	2.25*	9	2	2:29.23	(1 1/2 lengths)	Irad Ortiz Jr.	
Jul 29, 2023	1 1/8 miles	Jim Dandy Stakes	II	Saratoga	0.75*	5	1	1:49.61	nose	Irad Ortiz Jr.	
Aug 26, 2023	1 1/4 miles	Travers Stakes	I	Saratoga	1.75*	7	4	2:02.23	(8 lengths)	Irad Ortiz Jr.	

Notes:
An (*) asterisk after the odds means Forte was the post-time favourite.

== Pedigree ==
Pedigree of Forte, Dark Bay or Brown colt, February 3, 2020
Sire Violence (2010)	Medaglia d'Oro (1999)	El Prado (IRE) (1989)	Sadler's Wells (1981)
Sire Violence (2010)	Medaglia d'Oro (1999)	El Prado (IRE) (1989)	Lady Capulet (1974)
Sire Violence (2010)	Medaglia d'Oro (1999)	Cappucino Bay (1989)	Bailjumper (1974)
Sire Violence (2010)	Medaglia d'Oro (1999)	Cappucino Bay (1989)	Dubbed In (1973)
Sire Violence (2010)	Violent Beauty (2003)	Gone West (1984)	Mr. Prospector* (1970)
Sire Violence (2010)	Violent Beauty (2003)	Gone West (1984)	Secrettame (1978)
Sire Violence (2010)	Violent Beauty (2003)	Storming Beauty (1998)	Storm Cat* (1983)
Sire Violence (2010)	Violent Beauty (2003)	Storming Beauty (1998)	Sky Beauty (1990)
Dam Queen Caroline (2013)	Blame (2006)	Arch (1995)	Kris S (1982)
Dam Queen Caroline (2013)	Blame (2006)	Arch (1995)	Aurora (1988)
Dam Queen Caroline (2013)	Blame (2006)	Liable (1995)	Seeking The Gold* (1985)
Dam Queen Caroline (2013)	Blame (2006)	Liable (1995)	Bound (1984)
Dam Queen Caroline (2013)	Queen Plaza (2002)	Forestry (1985)	Storm Cat* (1983)
Dam Queen Caroline (2013)	Queen Plaza (2002)	Forestry (1985)	Shared Interest (1988)
Dam Queen Caroline (2013)	Queen Plaza (2002)	Kew Garden (1997)	Seattle Slew (1974)
Dam Queen Caroline (2013)	Queen Plaza (2002)	Kew Garden (1997)	Jeano (1988) (family 1-x)

* Forte is inbred 4S x 4D to the stallion Storm Cat, meaning that he appears in the fourth generation on the sire side of his pedigree and fourth generation on the dam side of his pedigree.

* Forte is inbred 4S x 5D to the stallion Mr. Prospector, meaning that he appears in the fourth generation on the sire side and in the fifth generation (via Seeking The Gold) on the dam side of his pedigree.
