= 2019 Belmont Stakes =

American horse race

151st Belmont Stakes
- Belmont Stakes
- Grade I stakes race
- "The Test of the Champion"
- Location: Belmont Park; Elmont, New York, United States
- Date: June 8, 2019
- Distance: 1 1/2 mi (12 furlongs; 2,414 m)
- Winning horse: Sir Winston
- Winning time: 2:28.30
- Final odds: 10.20 (to 1)
- Jockey: Joel Rosario
- Trainer: Mark E. Casse
- Owner: Tracy Farmer
- Conditions: Fast
- Surface: Dirt
- Attendance: 56,217

The 2019 Belmont Stakes was the 151st running of the Belmont Stakes and the 108th time the event took place at Belmont Park. The 1 1/2-mile (2,400 m) race, known as the "test of the champion", is the final leg in the American Triple Crown, open to three-year-old Thoroughbreds. Sir Winston won the race, with a time of 2:28.30.

The race took place on June 8, 2019, in Elmont, New York, with post time scheduled for 6:37 p.m. ET. It was a Grade I stakes race with a purse of $1.5 million, broadcast on NBC with coverage of the undercard on NBCSN. There was no chance of a Triple Crown winner, as Kentucky Derby winner Country House did not run in the Preakness Stakes, due to his trainer detecting a virus.

== Field ==
Following the Preakness, likely contenders for the Belmont were:

- War of Will – winner of the Preakness, seventh in the Kentucky Derby
- Tacitus – third in the Kentucky Derby, winner of the Tampa Bay Derby and Wood Memorial Stakes
- Everfast – second in the Preakness
- Bourbon War – eighth in the Preakness
- Sir Winston – second in the Peter Pan Stakes
- Intrepid Heart – third in the Peter Pan
- Master Fencer – sixth in the Kentucky Derby
- Tax – 14th in the Kentucky Derby, second in the Wood Memorial
- Spinoff – 18th in the Kentucky Derby
- Joevia – winner of the Long Branch Stakes

== Results ==
The post position draw was held on June 4 at Citi Field, prior to that day's New York Mets game.

Finish	PP	Horse	Jockey	Trainer	Record†	Morning line odds	Final odds	Margin (lengths)	Winnings
1	7	Sir Winston	Joel Rosario	Mark E. Casse	9–2–1–1	12–1	10.20	—	$800,000
2	10	Tacitus	José Ortiz	William I. Mott	5–3–0–1	9–5	1.95	1	$280,000
3	1	Joevia	Jose Lezcano	Greg Sacco	5–2–2–0	30–1	21.60	4 3/4	$150,000
4	4	Tax	Irad Ortiz Jr.	Danny Gargan	6–2–2–1	15–1	11.70	5 3/4	$100,000
5	3	Master Fencer	Julien Leparoux	Koichi Tsunoda	7–2–2–0	8–1	13.30	5 3/4	$60,000
6	6	Spinoff	Javier Castellano	Todd Pletcher	5–2–1–1	15–1	10.40	6	$45,000
7	2	Everfast	Luis Saez	Dale Romans	11–1–2–1	12–1	16.50	6	$35,000
8	8	Intrepid Heart	John R. Velazquez	Todd Pletcher	3–2–0–1	10–1	6.90	7 3/4	$30,000
9	9	War of Will	Tyler Gaffalione	Mark E. Casse	10–4–1–1	2–1	3.65	10	
10	5	Bourbon War	Mike E. Smith	Mark Hennig	6–2–1–0	12–1	10.00	14 3/4	

† Starts–Wins–Places–Shows, prior to the Belmont

Track: Fast

Times: 1/4 mile – 23.92; 1/2 mile – 48.79; 3/4 mile – 1:13.54; mile – 1:38.27; 1 1/4 miles – 2:02.72; final – 2:28.30.
Splits for each quarter-mile: (23.92) (24.87) (24.75) (24.73) (24.45) (25.58)

Source: Equibase Chart

=== Payouts ===
Program number	Horse name	Win	Place	Show
7	Sir Winston	$22.40	$8.80	$6.10
10	Tacitus	–	$3.90	$3.20
1	Joevia	–	–	$8.70

- $1 Exacta: (7-10) $48.00
- $1 Trifecta: (7-10-1) $1,244.00
- $1 Superfecta: (7-10-1-4) $10,428.00

=== Wagering ===
Wagering on the Belmont Stakes day totaled US$102.2 million, including US$53.2 million on the Belmont Stakes race, and the three-day Belmont Stakes Racing Festival had a total wagering handle of US$131.9 million. NYRA said it was the highest for an edition with no Triple Crown candidate; the 2018 Belmont Stakes day had a wagering handle of US$138.0 million.
