= 2019 Road to the Kentucky Derby =

The 2019 Road to the Kentucky Derby was a series of races through which horses qualified for the 2019 Kentucky Derby, which was held on May 4, 2019. The field for the Derby is limited to 20 horses, with up to four 'also eligibles' in case of a late withdrawal from the field. There are three separate paths for horses to take to qualify for the Derby: the main Road consisting of races in North America (plus one in Dubai), the Japan Road consisting of four races in Japan, and a European Road consisting of seven races in England, Ireland and France.

The main Road to the Kentucky Derby gives points to the top four finishers in specified races. The 2019 season was supposed to remain the same as the 2018 Road to the Kentucky Derby, consisting of 35 races broken down into 19 races for the Kentucky Derby Prep Season and 16 races for the Kentucky Derby Championship Season. Earnings in non-restricted stakes act as a tie breaker. However, the San Felipe Stakes was not run in 2019 due to difficulties with the track surface at Santa Anita Park in the wake of heavy winter rains, while the Rebel Stakes was run in two divisions with the posts adjusted to 37.5-15-7.5-3.75 for each division.

For 2019, some small changes were made from 2018 for the other series:

- Race changes: In the European Road, the Cardinal Stakes replaced the Burradon Stakes. Added a fourth race to the Japan series – the Fukuryu Stakes.
- Points system changes: Fukuryu Stakes in Japan was set at 40-16-8-4 points to the top four placings. The Zen-Nippon Nisai Yushun points were doubled to 20-8-4-2.

== Main Road to the Kentucky Derby ==
=== Standings ===
The following table shows the points earned in the eligible races for the main series. Entries for the 2019 Kentucky Derby were taken on April 30. Omaha Beach was originally entered but was scratched on May 1 due to an entrapped epiglottis. Haikal subsequently scratched as well. As a result, Bodexpress drew into the race.

Country House, who qualified by finishing second in the Risen Star and third in the Arkansas Derby, was declared the winner after Maximum Security was disqualified for interference.

Rank	Horse	Points	Earnings (Note: Earnings from non-restricted stakes prior to the running of the Kentucky Derby serve as a tie-breaker.)	Trainer	Owner	Ref
1	Tacitus	150	$610,000	William I. Mott	Juddmonte Farms	
scratched	Omaha Beach	137.5	$1,050,000	Richard E. Mandella	Fox Hill Farm	
2	Vekoma	110	$747,600	George Weaver	R.A. Hill Stable and Gatsas Stables	
3	Plus Que Parfait	104	$1,540,400	Brendan Walsh	Imperial Racing	
4	Roadster	100	$636,000	Bob Baffert	Speedway Stable LLC	
5	By My Standards	100	$600,000	Bret Calhoun	Allied Racing Stable	
6	Maximum Security	100	$582,800	Jason Servis	Gary & Mary West	
7	Game Winner	85	$1,810,000	Bob Baffert	Gary & Mary West	
8	Code of Honor	74	$432,070	Claude R. McGaughey	William Farish	
scratched	Haikal	70	$322,500	Kiaran McLaughlin	Shadwell Stable	
9	Improbable	65	$589,520	Bob Baffert	WinStar Farm, China Horse Club and Starlight Racing	
10	War of Will	60	$450,840	Mark Casse	Gary Barber	
11	Long Range Toddy	53.5	$830,000	Steven Asmussen	Willis Horton Racing LLC	
12	Tax	52	$307,500	Danny Gargan	Hugh Lynch and Corms Racing Stable, R.A. Hill Stable, Reeves Thoroughbred Racing	
13	Cutting Humor	50	$462,467	Todd Pletcher	Starlight Racing	
14	Win Win Win	50	$316,000	Michael Trombetta	Live Oak Plantation	
**15**	**Country House**	**50**	**$220,000**	**William Mott**	**Mrs. J. V. Shields, E. J. M. McFadden and LNJ Foxwoods**	
16	Gray Magician	41	$526,000	Peter Miller	Wachtel Stable, Eclipse Thoroughbred Partners, Gary Barber	
17	Spinoff	40	$224,000	Todd Pletcher	Wertheimer et Frère	
18	Master Fencer qualified for the then 20th position through the Japan Road to the Kentucky Derby (below)					
19 (Note: Bodexpress, originally listed as also eligible, drew into the field when Omaha Beach was scratched)	Bodexpress	40	$188,000	Gustavo Delgado	Top Racing, Global Thoroughbred & GDS Racing Stable	
	Signalman	38	$492,840	Kenneth McPeek	Tommie M. Lewis & Magdalena Racing	
bypassing (Note: Anothertwistafate is bypassing the Derby to focus on the Preakness)	Anothertwistafate	38	$268,960	Blaine Wright	Peter Redekop	
	Sueno	32	$285,000	Keith Desormeaux	Silverton Hill	
	Bourbon War	31	$137,200	Mark Hennig	Bourbon Lane Stable & Lake Star Stable	
bypassing (Note: Connections of Mind Control have removed the horse off the Kentucky Derby trail and are considering one turn races)	Mind Control	30	$492,500	Gregory Sacco	Red Oak Stable & Madaket Stables	
bypassing	Somelikeithotbrown	30	$371,665	Mike Maker	Skychai Racing and Sand Dollar Stable	
	Instagrand	30	$276,000	Jerry Hollendorfer	OXO Equine	
	Mucho Gusto	24	$286,800	Bob Baffert	Michael Lund Petersen	
injured (Note: Gunmetal Gray underwent surgery to repair a condylar fracture and is doubtful to participate in the Kentucky Derby)	Gunmetal Gray	21.75	$247,500	Jerry Hollendorfer	Hollendorfer & West Point Thoroughbreds	
	Knicks Go	20	$675,085	Ben Colebrook	Korea Racing Authority Stud Farm	
not nominated	Manguzi	20	$280,000	Ali Rashid Al Rayhi	Ahmad Al Shaikh	
	Owendale	20	$124,000	Brad H. Cox	Rupp Racing	
	Outshine	20	$74,500	Todd Pletcher	Let's Go Stable and Richard Schibell	
injured (Note: Maximus Mischief sustained an undisclosed injury in preparations for the Fountain of Youth Stakes and connections indicated that the horse would be sidelined indefinitely)	Maximus Mischief	12	$171,100	Robert E. Reid Jr	Cash is King LLC and LC Racing	
bypassing	Derma Lourve (Note: Derma Lourve is also in the Japan Road to the Kentucky Derby)	10	$616,402	Hiroyuki Asanuma	Hirofumi Toda	
injured (Note: Super Steed sustained a bone bruise during training and connections indicated that the horse would not be ready for the Kentucky Derby)	Super Steed	10	$304,000	Mike Pressley	Mike Pressley and Steed Jackson	
not nominated	Complexity	10	$275,000	Chad C. Brown	Klaravich Stables	
	Harvey Wallbanger	10	$218,320	Kenneth McPeek	Harold Lerner, AWC Stables, Nehoc Stables, Scott Akman & Pa Braverman	
	Gray Attempt	10	$211,666	William H. Fires	Dwight Pruett	
bypassing	Well Defined	10	$172,970	Kathleen O'Connell	Stonehedge	
bypassing (Note: Connections of Cairo Cat decided not to contend for the Kentucky Derby due to a setback in preparation)	Cairo Cat	10	$86,490	Kenneth McPeek	Walking L Thoroughbreds	
	Nolo Contesto	10	$60,000	John Sadler	Hronis Racing	
bypassing	Roiland	10	$57,460	Thomas Amoss	James and Mary Durlacher	
	Laughing Fox	10	$53,000	Steven M. Asmussen	Lieblong, Alex and JoAnn	
not nominated	Math Wizard	10	$50,000	Saffie Joseph Jr.	John Fanelli, Collarmele Vitelli Stables, Bassett Stables, Ioannis Zoumas, Wynwood Thoroughbreds & Saffie A. Joseph Jr.	
bypassing	Hog Creek Hustle	9	$75,000	Vickie Foley	Something Special Racing	
not nominated	Dynamic Racer	8	$52,150	Ronald Kahles	Lou Dunn Diekemper Trust	
	Market King	7.5	$77,222	D. Wayne Lukas	Robert C. Baker & William L. Mack	
	Galilean	7.5	$75,000	Jerry Hollendorfer	West Point Thoroughbreds, Denise Barker, William Sandbrook	
bypassing	Much Better	7	$50,000	Bob Baffert	Three Chimneys Farm	
bypassing	Our Braintrust (Note: Originally the horse was owned by Cathal Lynch and Stanton Smith Jr. and trained by Cathal Lynch but was sold in a private purchase)	6	$147,000	Mark Casse	Gary Barber	
bypassing	Wicked Indeed	6	$46,400	Steven Asmussen	Winchell Thoroughbreds	
bypassing	Extra Hope	5.75	$79,500	Richard E. Mandella	Jay Em Ess Stable	
	Zenden	5	$91,270	Victor Barboza Jr.	Pichi Investments	
bypassing	Hidden Scroll	5	$28,800	William Mott	Juddmonte Farms	
bypassing	Bankit	4	$106,000	Steven Asmussen	Winchell Thoroughbreds & Willis Horton Racing	
bypassing (Note: Network Effect suffered a minor setback and connections are not considering entering the Kentucky Derby)	Network Effect	4	$90,000	Chad C. Brown	Klaravich Stables	
bypassing	Everfast	4	$88,635	Dale Romans	Calumet Farm	
not nominated	Tight Ten	4	$67,900	Steve Asmussen	Winchell Thoroughbreds	
	Not That Brady	4	$52,500	Rudy Rodriguez	Michael Imperio, Rudy Rodriguez and Lianna Stables	
injured (Note: Kentucky Wildcat suffered a condylar fracture in the Sam F. Davis Stakes and underwent surgery and connections are not considering entering the Kentucky Derby)	Kentucky Wildcat	4	$40,000	Thomas Albertrani	Godolphin	
	Moonster	4	$23,272	Dale Romans	Calumet Farms	
bypassing	Kingly	4	$20,000	Bob Baffert	Clearview Stables	
not nominated	Call Paul	2	$311,420	Jason Servis	Michael Dubb, David Simon, Bethlehem Stables and Bruce Irom	
bypassing	Mr. Money	2	$124,000	W. Bret Calhoun	Allied Racing Stable	
bypassing	Rowayton	2	$96,000	Jerry Hollendorfer	OXO Equine	
	Six Shooter	2	$77,500	Paul E. Holthus	Dundalk 5, NPH Stable and Wes Herek	
bypassing	Five Star General	2	$68,400	Arnaud Delacour	WinStar Farm, China Horse Club & SF Racing	
bypassing	Dunph	2	$53,000	Michael J. Maker	Three Diamonds Farm	
bypassing	Manny Wah	2	$52,425	Wayne M. Catalano	Susan Moulton	
bypassing	Standard Deviation	2	$50,000	Chad C. Brown	Klaravich Stables	
bypassing	Easy Shot	2	$42,500	Keith Desormeaux	Calumet Farm	
bypassing	Family Biz	2	$41,475	Edward Barker	Danny Chen, James Cestaro & Campbell Road Stables	
bypassing	Limonite	2	$26,200	Steven Asmussen	Winchell Thoroughbreds & Willis Horton Racing	
	So Alive	2	$22,223	Todd Pletcher	Robert LaPenta	
	More Ice	2	$21,984	Jerry Hollendorfer	Jerry Hollendorfer, Kenwood Racing and Richard Robertson	
not nominated	Pole Setter	2	$17,950	Brad Cox	Steve Landers Racing	
bypassing	Boldor	2	$16,667	Steven Asmussen	Susie and Ed Orr	
not nominated	Sombeyay	1	$158,500	Todd Pletcher	Starlight Racing	
	Sir Winston	1	$80,081	Mark Casse	Tracy Farmer	
not nominated	Tobacco Road	1	$63,400	Steven Asmussen	L and N Racing	
not nominated	Dueling	1	$38,000	Jerry Hollendorfer	Michael Stinson	
not nominated	Aurelius Maximus	1	$30,000	Chad C. Brown	Stonestreet Stables, G. Bolton, P. Leidel	
bypassing	Tone Broke	1	$24,000	Steven Asmussen	L and N Racing	
bypassing	Epic Dreamer	1	$20,800	Kelly Breen	Epic Racing	
not nominated	Jefe	1	$18,000	Keith Desormeaux	Big Chief Racing, Madaket Stables, Rocker O Ranch, Keith Desormeaux	
bypassing	Counter Offer	1	$12,000	Ian Wilkes	Six Column Stables	
bypassing	King for a Day	1	$9,100	Todd Pletcher	Red Oak Stable	
bypassing	Magnificent McCool	1	$9,000	Doug O'Neill	Phoenix Thoroughbred III	
bypassing	Gates of Dawn	1	$9,000	John Servis	Leonard Green	
bypassing	Angelo's Pride	1	$6,000	William Delia	William Delia, Anthony George & Mike Stone	

- Winner of Kentucky Derby in **bold**
- Entrants for Kentucky Derby in blue
- "Also eligible" for Kentucky Derby in green
- Did not qualify/Not nominated/No longer under Derby consideration/Sidelined in gray-->

=== Prep season results ===
Note: 1st=10 points; 2nd=4 points; 3rd=2 points; 4th=1 point (except the Breeders' Cup Juvenile: 1st=20 points; 2nd=8 points; 3rd=4 points; 4th=2 point)

Race	Distance	Purse	Track	Date	1st	2nd	3rd	4th	Ref
Iroquois	1 1/16 miles	$150,000	Churchill Downs	Sep 15 2018	Cairo Cat	Tight Ten	Pole Setter	Tobacco Road	
American Pharoah (Note: The event was renamed in 2018 from the FrontRunner Stakes in honor of its 2014 winner, American Pharoah, who also won the U.S. Triple Crown in 2015.)	1 1/16 miles	$300,000	Santa Anita	Sep 29 2018	Game Winner	Gunmetal Gray	Rowayton	Jefe	
Champagne	1 mile	$500,000	Belmont	Oct 6 2018	Complexity	Code of Honor	Call Paul	Aurelius Maximus	
Breeders' Futurity	1 1/16 miles	$500,000	Keeneland	Oct 6 2018	Knicks Go	Signalman	Standard Deviation	Sombeyay	
Breeders' Cup Juvenile	1 1/16 miles	$2,000,000	Churchill Downs	Nov 2 2018	Game Winner	Knicks Go	Signalman	Mr. Money	
Kentucky Jockey Club	1 1/16 miles	$200,000	Churchill Downs	Nov 24 2018	Signalman	Plus Que Parfait	Limonite	King for a Day	
Remsen	1 1/8 miles	$250,000	Aqueduct	Dec 1 2018	Maximus Mischief	Network Effect	Tax	Bourbon War	
Los Alamitos Futurity	1 1/16 miles	$300,345	Los Alamitos	Dec 8 2018	Improbable	Mucho Gusto	Extra Hope	Dueling	
Springboard Mile	1 mile	$400,000	Remington	Dec 16 2018	Long Range Toddy	Bankit	Dunph	Tone Broke	
Jerome	1 mile	$150,900	Aqueduct	Jan 1 2019	Mind Control	Our Braintrust	Family Biz	Gates of Dawn	
Sham	1 mile	$100,702	Santa Anita	Jan 5 2019	Gunmetal Gray	Sueno	Much Better	Gray Magician	
Lecomte	1 mile & 70 yards	$200,000	Fair Grounds	Jan 19 2018	War of Will	Hog Creek Hustle	Manny Wah	Wicked Indeed	
Smarty Jones	1 mile	$150,000	Oaklawn	Jan 25 2018	Gray Attempt	Long Range Toddy	Boldor	Six Shooter	
Holy Bull	1 1/16 miles	$350,000	Gulfstream	Feb 2 2019	Harvey Wallbanger	Everfast	Maximus Mischief	Epic Dreamer	
Withers	1 1/8 miles	$250,000	Aqueduct	Feb 2 2019	Tax	Not That Brady	Our Braintrust	Sir Winston	
Robert B. Lewis	1 1/16 miles	$147,351	Santa Anita	Feb 2 2019	Mucho Gusto	Gunmetal Gray	Easy Shot	Magnificent McCool	
Sam F. Davis Stakes	1 1/16 miles	$250,000	Tampa Bay	Feb 9 2019	Well Defined	Kentucky Wildcat	So Alive	Counter Offer	
El Camino Real Derby	1 1/8 miles	$101,800	Golden Gate	Feb 16 2019	Anothertwistafate	Kingly	More Ice	Angelo's Pride	
Southwest	1 1/16 miles	$500,000	Oaklawn	Feb 18 2019	Super Steed	Sueno	Long Range Toddy	Six Shooter	

=== Championship series results ===
==== First leg of series ====
Note: 1st=50 points; 2nd=20 points; 3rd=10 points; 4th=5 points except for the Rebel Stakes
Rebel Stakes (both divisions) 1st=37.5 points; 2nd=15 points; 3rd=7.5 points; 4th=3.75 points

Race	Distance	Purse	Grade	Track	Date	1st	2nd	3rd	4th	Ref
Risen Star	1 1/16 miles	$400,000	2	Fair Grounds	Feb 16 2019	War of Will	Country House	Roiland	Hog Creek Hustle	
Fountain of Youth	1 1/16 miles	$400,000	2	Gulfstream	Mar 2 2019	Code of Honor	Bourbon War	Vekoma	Hidden Scroll	
Gotham	1 mile	$300,900	3	Aqueduct	Mar 9 2019	Haikal	Mind Control	Instagrand	Much Better	
Tampa Bay Derby	1 1/16 miles	$355,000	2	Tampa Bay	Mar 9 2019	Tacitus	Outshine	Win Win Win	Zenden	
San Felipe	1 1/16 miles	$400,000	2	Santa Anita	Event not held (Note: Originally the San Felipe Stakes was scheduled to be held on Saturday, 9th March but the track administrators cancelled racing at the track indefinitely due to the number of equine fatalities and the state of the track which had been affected by the winter rains. The administrators of Santa Anita Park decided not to reschedule the race indicating that there would be not enough time when the track reopens.)					
Rebel (Division 1) (Note: The event was split into two division after Oaklawn president Louis Cella presented a sporting gesture after the San Felipe Stakes was abandoned. Each division would carry a purse of $750,000 as the track was prepared to commit an additional $500,000 to the initial $1 million purse. Additionally, 20 entries were to be entered so that the split into divisions would occur. Qualification points for the first four finishers would be adjusted.)	1 1/16 miles	$750,000	2	Oaklawn	Mar 16 2019	Long Range Toddy	Improbable	Galilean	Extra Hope	
Rebel (Division 2)	1 1/16 miles	$750,000	2	Oaklawn	Mar 16 2019	Omaha Beach	Game Winner	Market King	Gunmental Grey	
Sunland Derby	1 1/8 miles	$800,000	3	Sunland Park	Mar 24 2019	Cutting Humor	Anothertwistafate	Mucho Gusto	Wicked Indeed	

==== Second leg of series ====
These races are the major preps for the Kentucky Derby, and are thus weighted more heavily.
Note: 1st=100 points; 2nd=40 points; 3rd=20 points; 4th=10 points

Race	Distance	Purse	Grade	Track	Date	1st	2nd	3rd	4th	Ref
Louisiana Derby	1 1/8 miles	$1,000,000	2	Fair Grounds	Mar 23 2019	By My Standards	Spinoff	Sueno	Country House	
UAE Derby	1,900 metres (~1 3/16 miles)	$2,500,000	2	Meydan	Mar 30 2019	Plus Que Parfait	Gray Magician	Manguzi	Derma Louvre	
Florida Derby	1 1/8 miles	$1,000,000	1	Gulfstream	Mar 30 2019	Maximum Security	Bodexpress	Code of Honor	Bourbon War	
Wood Memorial	1 1/8 miles	$750,000	2	Aqueduct	Apr 6 2019	Tacitus	Tax	Haikal	Math Wizard	
Blue Grass Stakes	1 1/8 miles	$1,000,000	2	Keeneland	Apr 6 2019	Vekoma	Win Win Win	Signalman	Somelikeithotbrown	
Santa Anita Derby	1 1/8 miles	$1,000,351	1	Santa Anita	Apr 6 2019	Roadster	Game Winner	Instagrand	Nolo Contesto	
Arkansas Derby	1 1/8 miles	$1,000,000	1	Oaklawn Park	Apr 13 2019	Omaha Beach	Improbable	Country House	Laughing Fox	

==== "Wild Card" events ====
Note: 1st=20 points; 2nd=8 points; 3rd=4 points; 4th=2 points

Race	Distance	Purse	Track	Date	1st	2nd	3rd	4th	Ref
Jeff Ruby	1 1/8 miles	$200,000	Turfway	Mar 9 2019	Somelikeithotbrown	Dynamic Racer	Moonster	Five Star General	
Lexington	1 1/16 miles	$200,000	Keeneland	Apr 13 2019	Owendale	Anothertwistafate	Sueno	Knicks Go	

== Japan Road to the Kentucky Derby ==
The Japan Road to the Kentucky Derby is intended to provide a place in the Derby starting gate to the top finisher in the series. If the connections of that horse decline the invitation, their place is offered to the second-place finisher and so on through the top four finishers. If none of the top four accept, this place in the starting gate reverts to the horses on the main road to the Derby.

In 2019, the top three finishers in the Japan Road declined the invitation as they had not been nominated to the Derby. The connections of the fourth-place finisher, Master Fencer, decided to accept the offer, marking the first time that a Japanese-bred horse will enter the Derby.

=== Qualification table ===
The top four horses (colored brown within the standings) are eligible to participate in the Kentucky Derby provided the horse is nominated.

Rank	Horse	Points	Eligible Earnings	Trainer	Owner	Ref
not nominated	Der Flug	40	$157,187	Nobuiro Suzuki	Tsuru Nishimori	
not nominated	Oval Ace	30	$326,720	Takagi Noboru	Tsuru Nishimori	
not nominated	Nova Lenda	20	$446,285	Takashi Saito	U Carrot Farm	
1	Master Fencer (Note: Connections of Master Fencer accepted the invitation to the Kentucky Derby having qualified in one of the four qualification positions)	19	$168,979	Koichi Tsunoda	Katsumi Yoshizawa	
2	Derma Louvre	14	$616,402	Toda Hirofumi	Hiroyuki Asanuma	
not nominated	Weitblick	12	$195,593	Shoichiro Wada	U Carrot Farm	
not nominated	Make Happy	12	$184,181	Koichi Shinka	Kazuko Yoshida	
not nominated	Rhein Carina	8	$22,813	Yoshinori Muto	Shigemasa Osawa	
not nominated	Black Warrior	4	$216,271	Masayuki Nishimura	Norio Sato	
not nominated	Gal Vihara	4	$216,271	Kiyoshi Hagiwara	U Carrot Farm	
not nominated	Kingen	4	$179,479	Kunihide Matsuda	Godolphin	
not nominated	Johann	2	$72,900	Yasuyuki Takahashi	Cypress Holdings LLC	
3	Romanitco	1	$101,200	Kazuo Fujisawa	Nobutaka Tada	

Notes:

- blue highlight – accepted offer to enter the Kentucky Derby
- brown highlight – qualified on points but declined offer
- grey highlight – did not qualify

=== Events ===
Race	Distance	Track	Date	1st	2nd	3rd	4th	Ref
Cattleya Sho	1,600 metres (~1 mile)	Tokyo Racecourse	Nov 24 2018	Make Happy	Kingen	Johann	Romantico	
Zen-Nippon Nisai Yushun	1,600 metres (~1 mile)	Kawasaki Racecourse	Dec 19 2018	Nova Lenda	Derma Louvre	Gal Vihara	Make Happy	
Hyacinth	1,600 metres (~1 mile)	Tokyo Racecourse	Feb 17 2019	Oval Ace	Weitblick	Derma Louvre	Master Fencer	
Fukuryu	1,800 metres (~1 1/8 miles)	Nakayama Racecourse	Mar 31 2019	Der Flug	Master Fencer	Rhein Carina	Black Warrior	

Notes:
Cattleya Sho: 1st=10 points; 2nd=4 points; 3rd=2 points; 4th=1 point
Zen-Nippon Nisai Yushun: 1st=20 points; 2nd=8 points; 3rd=4 points; 4th=2 points
Hyacinth: 1st=30 points; 2nd=12 points; 3rd=6 points; 4th=3 points
Fukuryu : 1st=40 points; 2nd=16 points; 3rd=8 points; 4th=4 points

== European Road to the Kentucky Derby ==
The European Road to the Kentucky Derby is designed on a similar basis to the Japan Road and is intended to provide a place in the Derby starting gate to the top finisher in the series. If the connections of that horse decline the invitation, their place is offered to the second-place finisher and so on. If none of the top four accept, this place in the starting gate reverts to the horses on the main road to the Derby.

The series consists of seven races – four run on the turf in late 2018 when the horses are age two, plus three races run on a synthetic surface in early 2018.

=== Qualification Table ===
The top four horses (colored brown within the standings) were eligible to participate in the Kentucky Derby provided the horse is nominated. However, none of the connections accepted the invitation, so this position in the starting gate reverted to horses on the main Road.

Rank	Horse	Points	Eligible Earnings	Trainer	Owner	Ref
1	Bye Bye Hong Kong	30	$16,792	Andrew Balding	King Power Racing	
2	Playa Del Puente	20	$50,047	Michael Halford	Huang Kai Wen	
3	Jahbath	20	$0	William Haggas	Hamdan bin Rashid Al Maktoum	
4	Antilles	12	$0	Aidan O'Brien	Tabor, Smith, Magnier & Flaxman Stables	
	Royal Marine	10	$264,968	Saeed bin Suroor	Godolphin	
	Magna Grecia	10	$185,000	Aidan O'Brien	Derrick Smith, Mrs. John Magnier, Michael Tabor & Flaxman Stables	
	Mohawk	10	$129,702	Aidan O'Brien	Derrick Smith, Mrs. John Magnier & Michael Tabor	
	Japan	10	$75,316	Aidan O'Brien	Derrick Smith, Mrs. John Magnier & Michael Tabor	
	Western Australia	10	$43,084	Aidan O'Brien	Derrick Smith, Mrs. John Magnier & Michael Tabor	
	Getchagetchagetcha	8	$14,079	Clive Cox	Paul & Clare Rooney	
	Phoenix of Spain	4	$157,944	Charlie Hills	Tony Wechsler & Ann Plummer	
	Broome	4	$140,871	Aidan O'Brien	Derrick Smith, Mrs. John Magnier & Michael Tabor	
	Sydney Opera House	4	$40,956	Aidan O'Brien	Derrick Smith, Mrs. John Magnier & Michael Tabor	
	Mount Everest	4	$25,254	Aidan O'Brien	Derrick Smith, Mrs. John Magnier, Michael Tabor & Flaxman Stables	
	Numerian	4	$7,634	Joseph O'Brien	Long Wait Two Partnership	
	Target Zone	4	$0	David Elsworth	G B Partnership	
	Anodor	2	$99,215	Freddie Head	Ecurie Jean-Louis Bouchard	
	Cape Of Good Hope	2	$41,515	Aidan O'Brien	Derrick Smith, Mrs. John Magnier & Michael Tabor	
	Power Of Now	2	$11,489	Michael O'Callaghan	Michael O'Callaghan	
	Van Beethoven	2	$114,655	Aidan O'Brien	Derrick Smith, Mrs John Magnier & Michael Tabor	
	Chairmanoftheboard	2	$693	Mick Channon	David Kilburn, David Hudd & Chris Wright	
	Boitron	1	$44,917	Richard Hannon	Augustin-Normand & Middleham Park	
	Victory Command	1	$35,108	Mark Johnston	Kingsley Park	
	Circus Maximus	1	$24,368	Aidan O'Brien	Derrick Smith, Mrs. John Magnier, Michael Tabor & Flaxman Stables	
	Sovereign	1	$5,106	Aidan O'Brien	Derrick Smith, Mrs. John Magnier & Michael Tabor	

=== Events ===
Race	Distance	Track	Date	1st	2nd	3rd	4th	Ref
Royal Lodge Stakes	1 mile	Newmarket	Sep 29 2018	Mohawk	Sydney Opera House	Cape Of Good Hope	Victory Command	
Beresford Stakes	1 mile	Naas	Sep 30 2018	Japan	Mount Everest	Power Of Now	Sovereign	
Prix Jean-Luc Lagardère	1,600 m (about 1 mile)	ParisLongchamp	Oct 7 2018	Royal Marine	Broome	Anodor	Biotron	
Vertem Futurity Trophy (Note: Formerly known as the Racing Post Trophy)	1 mile	Doncaster	Oct 27 2018	Magna Grecia	Phoenix of Spain	Western Australia	Circus Maximus	
Road to the Kentucky Derby Conditions Stakes	1 mile	Kempton Park	Mar 6 2019	Jahbath	Getchagetchagetcha	Target Zone	Chairmanoftheboard	
Patton Stakes	1 mile	Dundalk	Mar 6 2019 (Note: Originally the Patton Stakes was scheduled to be held on Friday, 1st March but the meeting was abandoned due to a medical emergency at the track after the second race. The event was rescheduled for Wednesday, 6th March.)	Playa Del Puente	Western Australia	Numerian	Van Beethoven	
Cardinal Stakes	1 mile	Chelmsford City	Apr 11 2019	Bye Bye Hong Kong	Antilles	Dark Vision	U S S Michigan	

Note:

- the four races in 2018 for two-year-olds: 1st=10 points; 2nd=4 points; 3rd=2 points; 4th=1 point
- the first two races in 2019: 1st=20 points; 2nd=8 points; 3rd=4 points; 4th=2 points
- The Cardinal Stakes: 1st=30 points; 2nd=12 points; 3rd=6 points; 4th=3 points

== See also ==
- 2019 Road to the Kentucky Oaks
