= Justin Casse =

American bloodstock agent

Justin Casse is a bloodstock agent based in Ocala, Florida. He is the son of Norman Casse, one of the founders of OBS (Ocala Breeders Sale) and brother to the trainer Mark Casse. He graduated from Florida State University in 2002 with a bachelor's degree in International Affairs.

== Career ==
Casse's first job post-college was as working as a groom and assistant trainer for his brother, Mark. He followed that up with a stint at the consignment agency Paramount Sales in Lexington, Kentucky.

Casse started Casse Sales LLC, a sales consignment agency, at the age of 24, and gradually built the business to include clients such as Eugene Melnyk, John C. Oxley, Zayat Stables, Coolmore Stud, Kinsman Farm, Gary Barber, Earle I. Mack, Stonerside Stable, and Vincent Viola. The first 2-year-old he ever sold, a Rahy filly for George Steinbrenner's Kinsman Farm, brought $500,000. Jim Rome's two-time Breeders' Cup winner Mizdirection was also sold via Casse Sales LLC in 2010 and later achieved $2.7 million at Fasig-Tipton's November 2013 sale.

Casse is active as a buyer's agent, pinhooker and consignor. He has been involved in the winners of no less than nine Grade One stakes races. In October 2016, Dancing Rags, sold by Casse on behalf of Kinsman Stud, won the Alcibiades Stakes at Keeneland. Only a day later, Gary Barber's Keep Quiet, bought by Casse for €37,000 ($45,455) at the 2014 Arqana December sale in France, won the Dixiana Bourbon Stakes. He also purchased an interest in Haveyougoneaway on behalf of Barber and the mare later won the Ballerina Stakes. Barber's 2013 private purchase, Jack Milton, eventually won the Maker's Mark Mile Stakes. Negligee, consigned by Casse, also won the Alcibiades Stakes in 2009. She later sold for $625,000 as a broodmare prospect at the 2011 Keeneland January sale. Lear's Princess, co-pinhooked by Casse with his father, won the Gazelle Stakes at Belmont Park. In November 2013, Casse purchased a weanling by Zensational for Ahmed Zayat, the owner of American Pharoah, for $130,000. The colt was named Justin Squared, for both Casse and Justin Zayat. Justin Squared won the Chick Lang Stakes on the Preakness Stakes undercard in 2016. As a pinhooker, Casse sold the mare Gamay Noir in November 2015 for $1.1 million in foal to Tapit after being purchased for $375,000 nine months earlier. He also purchased a daughter of More Than Ready in September 2016 for $390,000, who achieved $1 million as a two-year-old in training seven months later.

In January 2017, Casse visited Gold Coast, Australia to attend the Magic Millions yearling sale and purchased approximately $1.1million Australian dollars in yearlings with Gai Waterhouse. Ten days later while at Cape Town he purchased the highest-priced yearling filly in the sale, sired by Frankel (horse), for 4 million South African rand. The filly was also Frankel's 3rd highest priced filly in the Southern Hemisphere. Casse's affinity for Frankel was on display later in the year, when he purchased the highest priced yearling to be sold in Ireland at the Goffs Orby sale. That yearling, named Old Glory, was revealed to be trained by Aidan O'Brien in County Tipperary at Ballydoyle. In February 2017, Casse was brought to Sydney, Australia by Inglis Sales company, founded by William Inglis (auctioneer), to advise investors and to develop their two-year-old in training sales. Later in 2017, after a second-place finish in the Preakness Stakes, it was announced that Coolmore Stud had purchased the stallion breeding rights to Breeders' Cup Juvenile winner and Eclipse Award for Outstanding 2-Year-Old Male Horse winner Classic Empire in a deal brokered by Justin Casse.

In May 2018 in Deauville, France, Casse purchased a 2-Year-Old Colt for Gary Barber by American stallion War Front, later named War of Will (horse). That year War of Will would run second in the Summer Stakes (Canada) and fifth in the Breeders' Cup Juvenile Turf, but eventually found his best running on dirt surfaces, despite that his pedigree suggests he would have an affinity for turf racing through the War Front and Sadler's Wells lineage. In early 2019, War of Will would be stabled at Fair Grounds Race Course and eventually win the Lecomte Stakes and the Risen Star Stakes. These victories would place him amongst the best 3-Year-Old Colts in America and make him an early favorite for the 2019 Kentucky Derby. In the Kentucky Derby, drawing post position one, War of Will lost any chance of victory after tangling with winner Maximum Security (horse). Maximum Security was disqualified, and his jockey, Luis Saez, was suspended for 15 days. In the days following, the owners of Maximum Security, Gary and Mary West, filed a lawsuit in federal court asking that the disqualification be reversed. Two weeks later at Pimlico Race Course, War of Will hugged the rail for most of the mile-and-three-sixteenths distance, before scooting to the middle of the track and holding off a challenge from a long shot named Everfast to win the Preakness Stakes, the second leg of the Triple Crown of Thoroughbred Racing.
