= 2019 Preakness Stakes =

144th running of the Preakness Stakes

144th Preakness Stakes
- Preakness Stakes
- Grade I stakes race
- "The Middle Jewel of the Triple Crown" "The Run for the Black-Eyed Susans"
- Location: Pimlico Race Course; Baltimore, United States
- Date: May 18, 2019
- Distance: 1 3/16 mi (9.5 furlongs; 1,900 m)
- Winning horse: War of Will
- Winning time: 1:54.34
- Final odds: 6.10–1
- Jockey: Tyler Gaffalione
- Trainer: Mark E. Casse
- Owner: Gary Barber
- Conditions: Fast
- Surface: Dirt
- Attendance: ▼131,256

The 2019 Preakness Stakes was the 144th running of the Preakness Stakes, the second leg of the American Triple Crown. It was held on May 18, 2019, at Pimlico Race Course in Baltimore, Maryland. The Preakness is a Grade I stakes race for three-year-old Thoroughbreds at a distance of 1 3/16 miles (1.9 km) with a record high purse of $1,650,000. The race was broadcast on NBC from 5:00 pm to 7:15 pm EDT with coverage of the undercard on NBCSN starting at 2:30 pm. The race was won by War of Will, who had finished seventh in the Kentucky Derby. The Maryland Jockey Club reported a total attendance of 131,256, the second highest attendance for American thoroughbred racing events in North America during 2019.

== Field ==
The Preakness traditionally features the winner of the Kentucky Derby competing against other runners from that race as well as some "new shooters" – horses that either bypassed the Derby or did not qualify. However, Country House – the winner of the 2019 Kentucky Derby (by disqualification) – was withdrawn from consideration for the Preakness on May 7 when his trainer detected a virus; this marked the first time the Kentucky Derby winner did not race in the Preakness Stakes since 1996. Due to his absence, there was no possibility of a Triple Crown winner for 2019. The field also did not include Maximum Security, who crossed the finish line first in the Kentucky Derby but was disqualified for impeding other horses. His owner indicated that without a chance of winning the Triple Crown, he felt that the two week gap between the Derby and Preakness was too short. In addition, Code of Honor and Tacitus, respectively the second- and third-place finishers in the Derby, skipped the Preakness. This meant that for the first time since 1951, the Preakness was missing the first four horses to cross the finish line in the Derby.

In their absence, thirteen horses were entered in the Preakness in what was considered a wide-open race. Contenders included:

- Improbable – fourth in the Derby, winner of the Los Alamitos Futurity, and second in the Rebel Stakes and Arkansas Derby
- War of Will – seventh in the Derby and winner of the Lecomte Stakes and Risen Star Stakes
- Win Win Win – ninth in the Kentucky Derby and second in the Blue Grass Stakes
- Bodexpress – thirteenth in the Derby and second in the Florida Derby
- Anothertwistafate – automatically qualified by winning the El Camino Real Derby
- Alwaysmining – automatically qualified by winning the Federico Tesio Stakes
- Laughing Fox – automatically qualified by winning the Oaklawn Stakes
- Signalman – winner of the Kentucky Jockey Club Stakes
- Owendale – winner of the Lexington Stakes
- Bourbon War – second in the Fountain of Youth Stakes

After the post position draw on May 15, Improbable was made the 5-2 morning-line favorite after also being the favorite in the Kentucky Derby.

== Race description ==
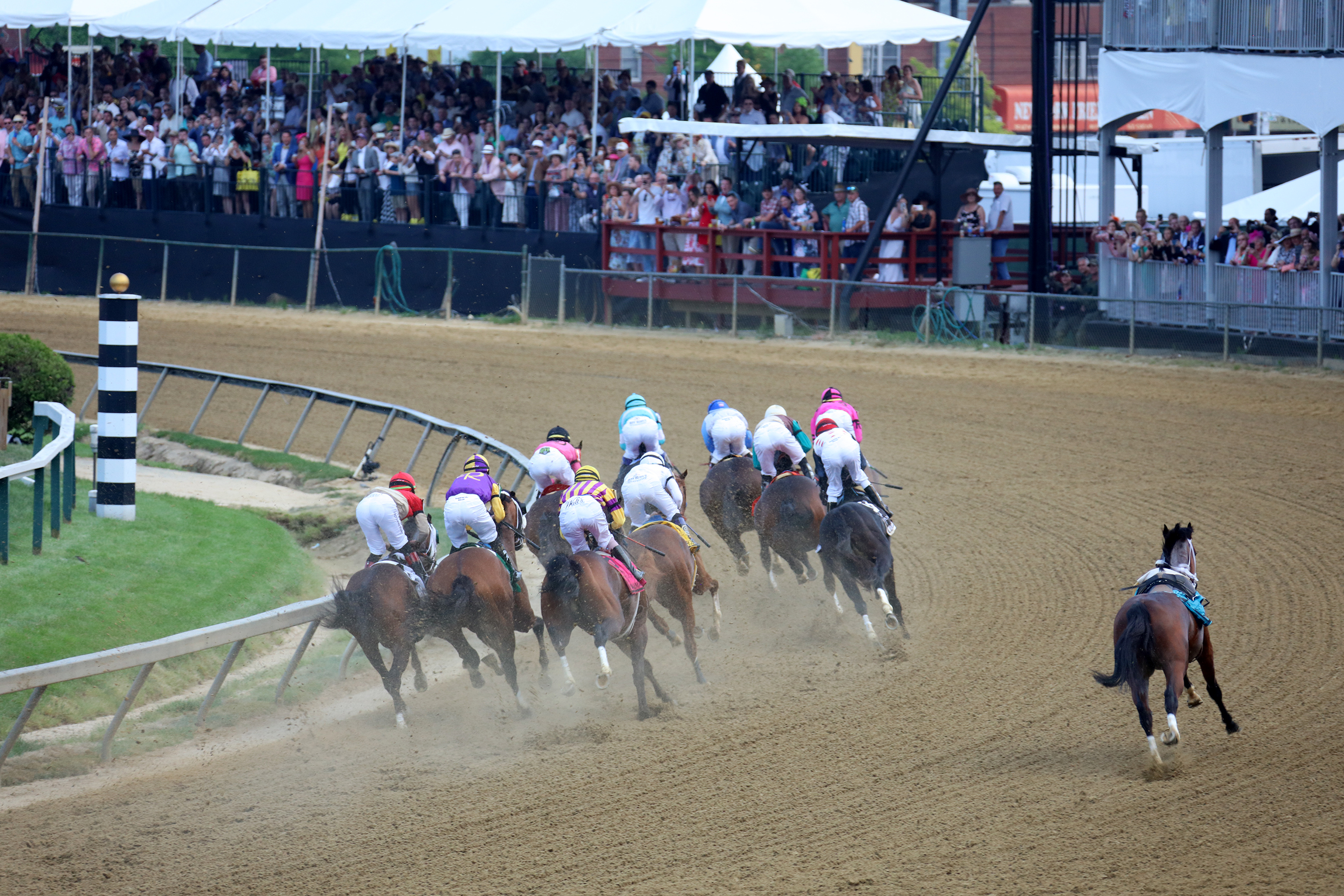
Going into the first turn, a riderless Bodexpress is on the outside of the field

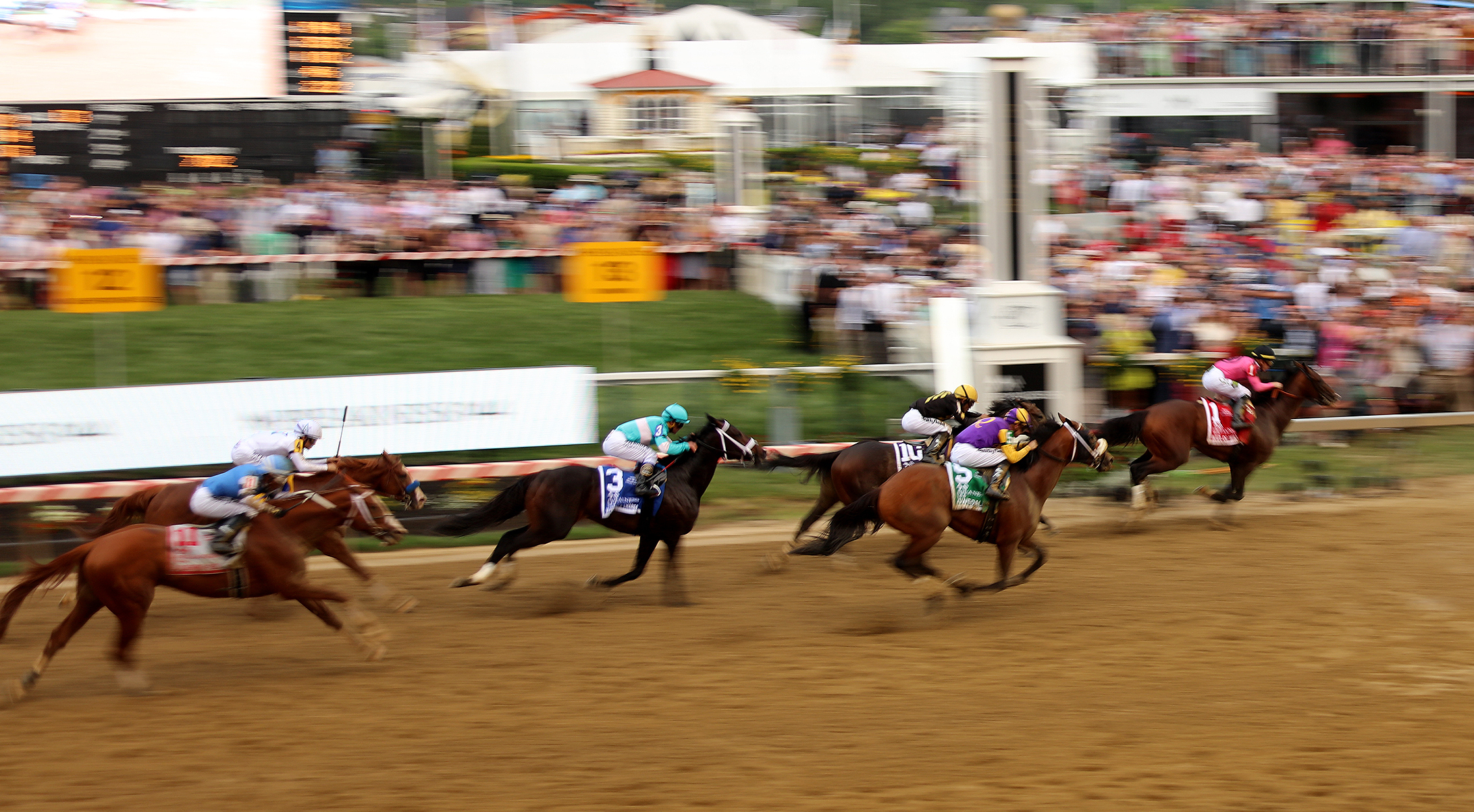
War of Will wins the Preakness

At the start, Bodexpress dislodged his jockey, John R. Velazquez, who was not injured. Warrior's Charge set the pace, followed by Market King, Anothertwistafate, and War of Will. Warrior's Charge had the lead through three-quarters of a mile, then started to fade at the top of the stretch. War of Will, on the rail, then took the lead, winning by 1 1/4 lengths. Everfast came from 11th place to finish in second by a nose, edging out Owendale who came from ninth to finish in third. Warrior's Charge finished fourth. Improbable, the favorite, finished sixth.

Bodexpress, who ran the entire course without his rider—officially a "did not finish"—captured public attention, with his name trending on Twitter. He was finally caught and brought under control by an outrider after the race.

== Records ==
Although the attendance was 2.4% less than 2018, wagering of $99,852,653 on the Preakness fourteen race card set a new record.

== Results ==
Finish	PP	Horse	Jockey	Trainer	Morning line odds	Final odds	Margin (lengths)	Winnings
1st	1	War of Will	Tyler Gaffalione	Mark E. Casse	4-1	6.10	—	$990,000
2nd	10	Everfast	Joel Rosario	Dale Romans	50-1	29.30	1 1/4	$330,000
3rd	5	Owendale	Florent Geroux	Brad Cox	10-1	7.90	1 1/4	$181,500
4th	3	Warrior's Charge	Javier Castellano	Brad Cox	12-1	12.60	2 1/2	$99,000
5th	11	Laughing Fox	Ricardo Santana Jr.	Steve Asmussen	20-1	21.60	3 3/4	$49,500
6th	4	Improbable	Mike E. Smith	Bob Baffert	5-2	2.50	3 3/4	
7th	13	Win Win Win	Julian Pimentel	Michael J. Trombetta	15-1	13.80	5 1/2	
8th	2	Bourbon War	Irad Ortiz Jr.	Mark A. Hennig	12-1	5.60	9 1/2	
9th	8	Signalman	Brian Hernandez Jr.	Kenneth McPeek	30-1	20.70	10 1/2	
10th	12	Anothertwistafate	José Ortiz	Blaine Wright	6-1	14.50	10 3/4	
11th	7	Alwaysmining	Daniel Centeno	Kelly Rubley	8-1	6.60	13 1/2	
12th	6	Market King	Jon Court	D. Wayne Lukas	30-1	31.90	23 3/4	
DNF†	9	Bodexpress	John R. Velazquez	Gustavo Delgado	20-1	20.10	N/A	

† Bodexpress dislodged his jockey at the start.

- Winning owner: Gary Barber
- Winning breeder: Flaxman Holdings Limited
- Track: Fast

Times: 1/4 mile – 0:22.50; 1/2 mile – 0:46.16; 3/4 mile – 1:10.56; mile – 1:35.48; final – 1:54.34.
Splits for each quarter-mile: (:23.66) (:24.40) (:24.23) (:24.92) (:18.86 for final 3/16)

Reference: Equibase Chart

== Payout ==
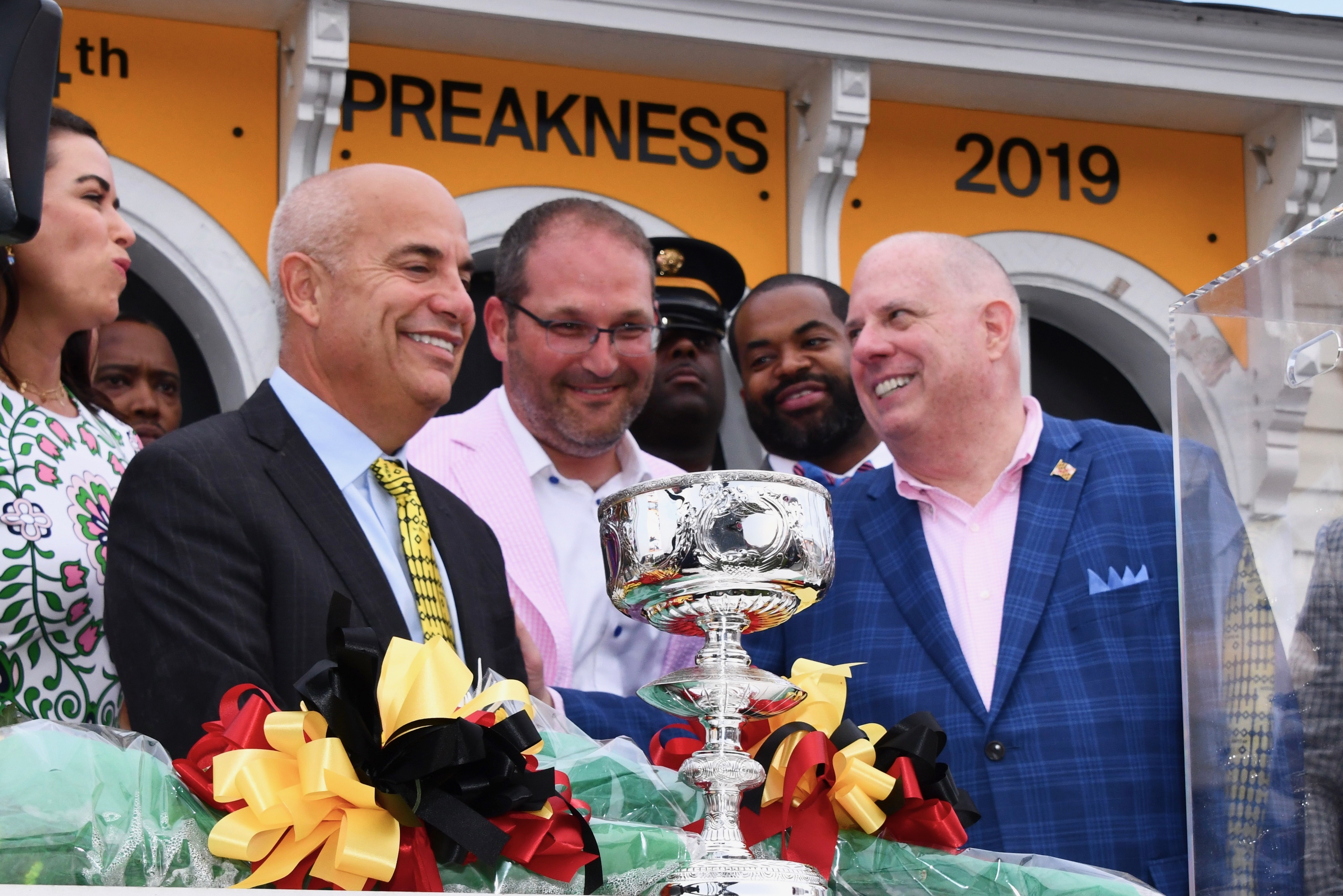
Trainer Mark E. Casse (with tie) at the trophy presentation

The 144th Preakness payout schedule

Pgm	Horse	Win	Place	Show
1	War of Will	$14.20	$7.40	$5.40
10	Everfast	–	$32.00	$14.40
5	Owendale	–	–	$6.00

- $2 Exacta (1–10) $947.00
- $1 Trifecta (1–10–5) $4,699.80
- $1 Superfecta (1–10–5–3) $51,924.00
- $1 Super High Five (1–10–5–3–11) no winner—$404,310 carryover
