= War of Will (horse) =

American-bred Thoroughbred racehorse

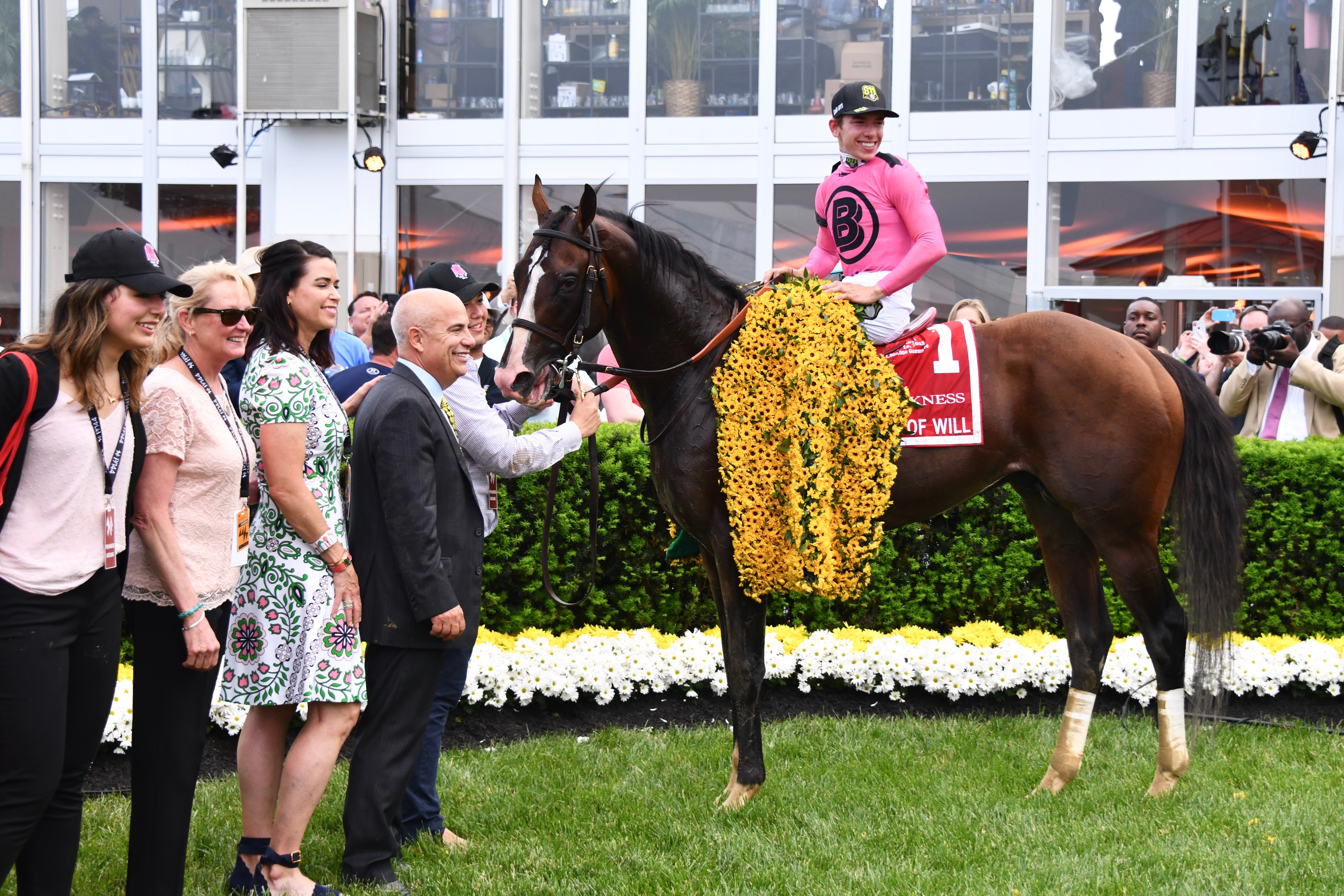
- War of Will after winning the 2019 Preakness Stakes
- Sire: War Front
- Grandsire: Danzig
- Dam: Visions of Clarity
- Damsire: Sadler's Wells
- Sex: Stallion
- Foaled: April 17, 2016
- Country: United States
- Colour: Bay
- Breeder: Flaxman Holdings
- Owner: Gary Barber
- Trainer: Mark Casse
- Record: 16: 5-1-2
- Earnings: $1,769,069

Major wins
- Lecomte Stakes (2019); Risen Star Stakes (2019); Maker's Mark Mile Stakes (2020); American Triple Crown wins: Preakness Stakes (2019)
- Last updated on July 10, 2020

War of Will (foaled April 17, 2016) is a classic winning American Thoroughbred racehorse who won the 2019 Preakness Stakes and is one of only three modern-day racehorses to win a Grade One on dirt and turf. He also won the 2019 Lecomte Stakes, 2019 Risen Star Stakes, and 2020 Maker's Mark Mile Stakes.

== Background ==
War of Will is a dark bay stallion with a large white blaze and four white socks who was bred in Kentucky by Flaxman Holdings, owned by the Niarchos family. His sire is War Front, a stakes winner on the dirt in America. As a sire however, War Front established his reputation with turf runners in Europe including Declaration of War, Roly Poly and U S Navy Flag. War of Will's dam, Visions of Clarity, is an Irish-bred daughter of leading European sire Sadler's Wells, also known as a turf sire. Visions of Clarity is a stakes-winning half-sister to Spinning World, winner of the 1997 Breeders' Cup Mile on the turf. Prior to foaling War of Will, she had already produced two stakes winners, Pathfork in Ireland and Tacticus in America. The female family traces to noted broodmare Best in Show, whose other descendants include El Gran Senor, Try My Best, Jazil, Rags to Riches and Redoute's Choice.

Despite his strong pedigree, War of Will did not meet his reserve at the 2017 Keeneland Yearling Sales and went unsold. Instead he was privately purchased by Norman Williamson, a former National Hunt jockey, who relocated the colt to Ireland for his early training. Williamson intended to resell the colt at the Tattersalls Craven Breeze-Up in April 2018 but ultimately sent him to the Arqana sales in France instead. There the colt caught the attention of bloodstock agent Justin Casse, who purchased the colt for €250,000 on behalf of his brother, trainer Mark Casse, who in turn offered the colt to longtime client Gary Barber.

War of Will's nickname is WOW, an acronym for his name and also a reference to his striking appearance and ability.

== Racing career ==
=== 2018: two-year-old season ===
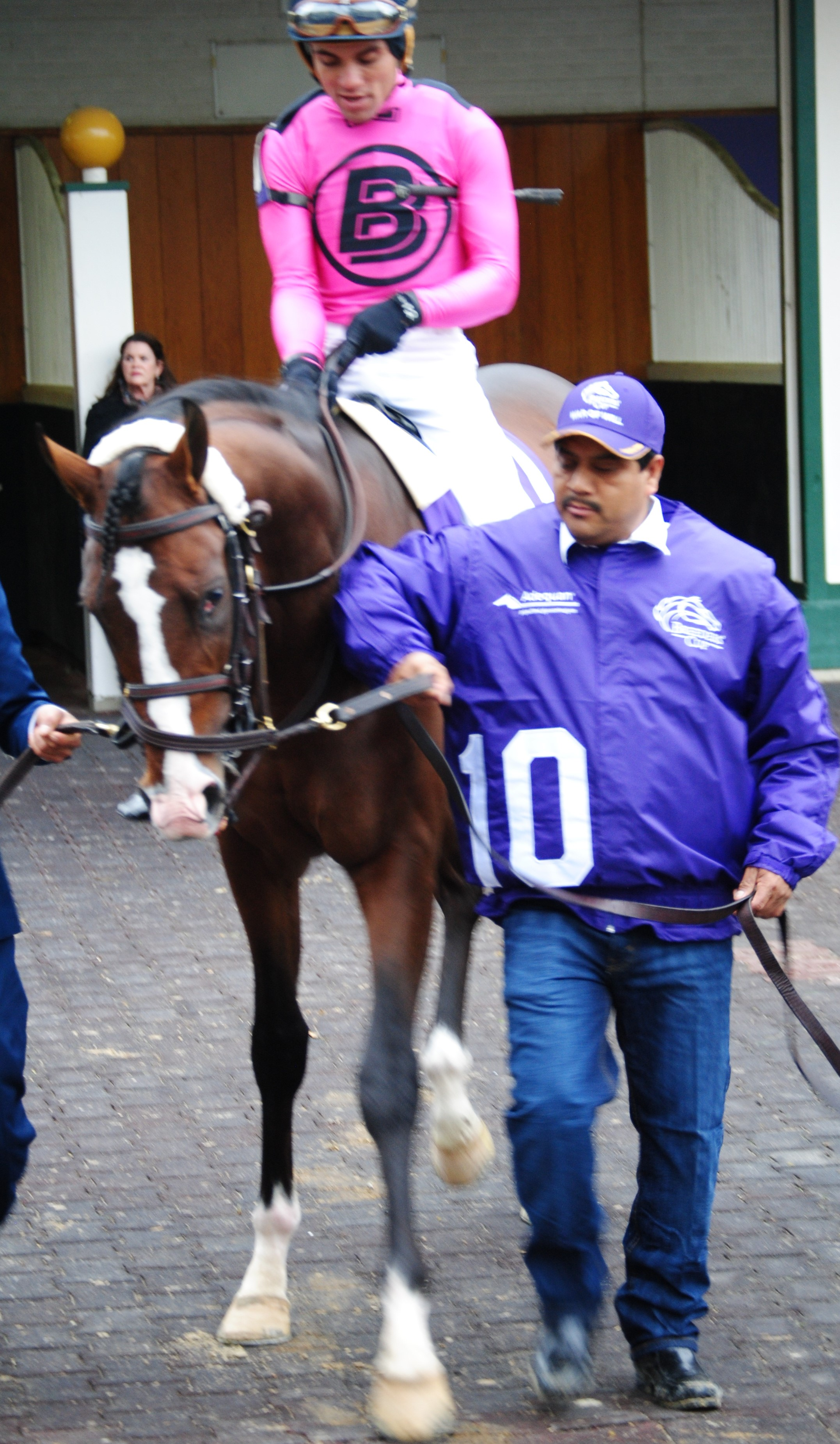
War of Will before the 2018 Breeders' Cup Juvenile Turf

War of Will made his debut on August 24, 2018, over the turf course at Woodbine Racetrack. Going off as the 3-2 favorite, he took the early lead but was challenged as they turned into the final stretch and finished third.

Despite the loss, Casse stepped the colt up in class by entering him in the Grade I Summer Stakes on September 16, also on the turf at Woodbine. Going off at odds of 10–1, War of Will pressed the early pace and took over the lead as they rounded the final turn. However, he could not match the closing burst of Fog of War and finished second. War of Will then finished fourth in the Bourbon Stakes at Keeneland and fifth in the Breeders' Cup Juvenile Turf at Churchill Downs.

Despite finishing in the money multiple times at the stakes level on turf, the colt was still a non-winner. At the urging of Barber, Casse decided to switch War of Will to the dirt. In a maiden race at Churchill Downs on November 24, War of Will responded with a five length win as the 2-1 favorite.

=== 2019: three-year-old season ===
War of Will made his three-year-old debut on January 19 in the Lecomte Stakes at Fair Grounds Race Course in Louisiana. Displaying a high cruising speed, he settled into third place during the first half mile then gradually pulled away to win by four lengths. "I have just the utmost respect for this horse", said Casse. "I think he has the potential to be an absolute superstar."

War of Will followed up by winning the Risen Star Stakes on February 16. Breaking from post position 13 in a field of 14, he used his early speed to get good position around the first turn then went to the lead as they rounded the final turn. After opening a large lead in midstretch, he withstood a closing run by Country House to win by 2 1/4 lengths. "He gets out of the gate well", said jockey Tyler Gaffalione, "he puts himself where he needs to be, and the rest is about getting him to relax."

The points earned by War of Will in the Lecomte and Risen Star moved him temporarily into first place on the 2019 Road to the Kentucky Derby. However, he finished a distant ninth as the odds-on favorite in his next start in the Louisiana Derby on March 23. Casse explained that the colt broke well but then buckled on his right hind after three or four strides. War of Will was significantly "off" immediately after the race but Casse did not rule the colt out of the Kentucky Derby picture. "This is something that he can get over very quickly", he said. "We'll see. The good news is he hasn't broken anything. It's a muscle strain of some sort. We're confident of that."

Kentucky Derby

In the 2019 Kentucky Derby, War of Will drew post position one, a tactical disadvantage in a large field due to the risk of getting trapped on the rail by heavy traffic. No horse had won the Derby from post position one since Ferdinand in 1986. Accordingly, Gaffalione urged the colt forward at the break, hoping to establish good position. However, War of Will could not match the early speed of Maximum Security, who went to the front and then slowed down the pace along the backstretch. Trapped on the rail, War of Will fought Gaffalione's efforts to get him to rate. Rounding the far turn, the field bunched up. With about five-sixteenths of a mile remaining in the race, Maximum Security suddenly swerved from his position about two paths out from the rail into the four or five path. This took him directly into the path of War of Will, who had shifted out from the rail to get racing room. The two horses made contact, knocking War of Will sideways and into Long Range Toddy, who in turn bumped with Bodexpress and Country House. War of Will checked strides, then tried to remount his challenge. However, he tired during the stretch drive and finished eighth, subsequently elevated to seventh when Maximum Security was disqualified for interference.

Despite bearing the brunt of the interference, Casse had told Gaffalione not to join the objection to the incident, since the colt would still not finish in the money. However, after watching the race on replay several times, Casse realized that the incident was more serious than he had originally thought, and was torn between regret at not getting a chance to win the race and gratitude that War of Will had not been injured. "As much as I want to win the Kentucky Derby, I feel like a lucky man today because I just got [War of Will] out and jogged him and he's perfect", he said. "The horse racing world should be happy War of Will is such an athlete because not every horse doesn't go down there."

Preakness Stakes

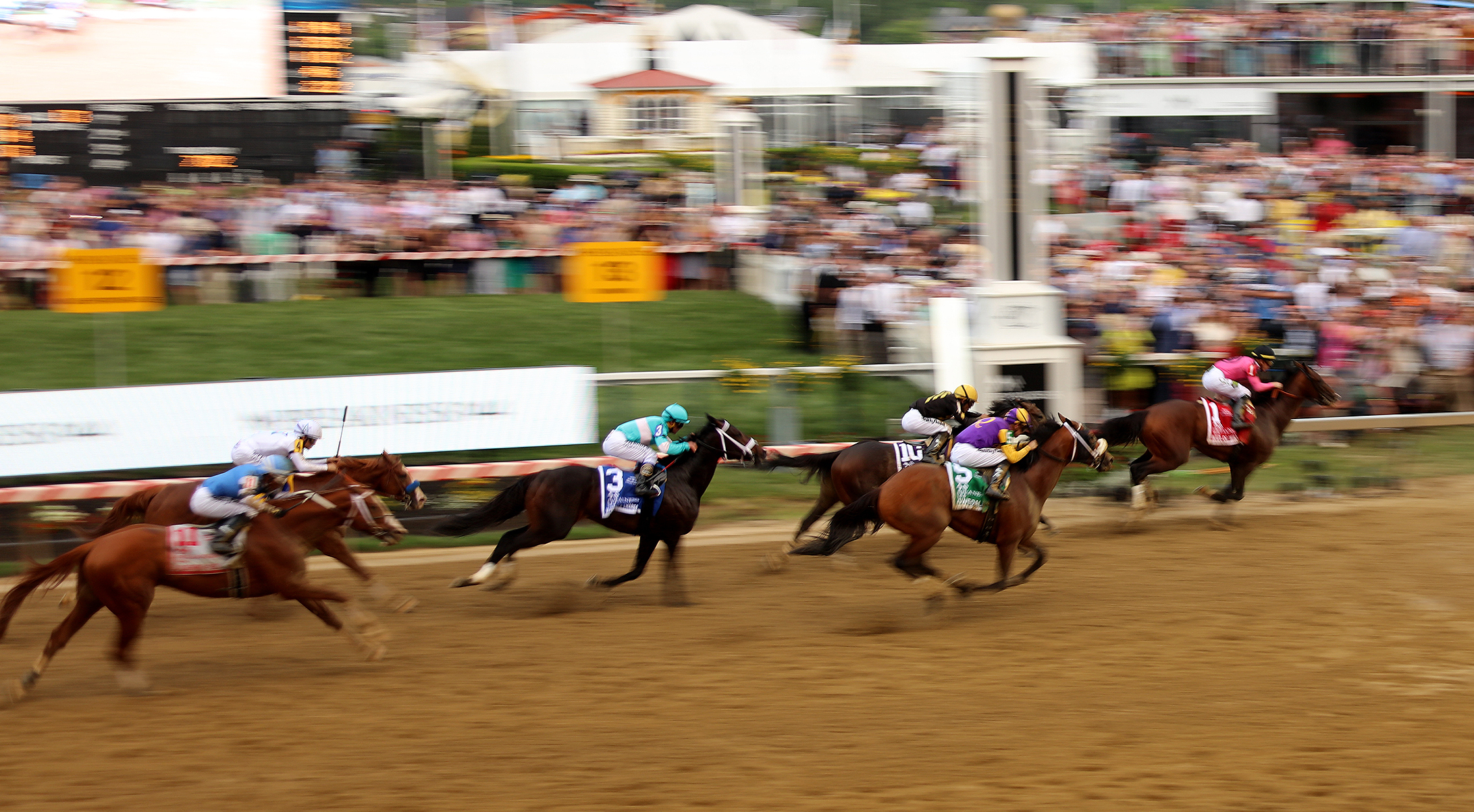
War of Will winning the Preakness

Neither Maximum Security nor Country House, who was awarded the Derby after the disqualification, attended the 2019 Preakness Stakes on May 18, leaving the race wide open. War of Will again drew the rail but this time Gaffalione eased him from the starting gate and was able to get the colt to relax in fourth place behind the early pace set by Warrior's Charge. Rounding the final turn into the stretch, a gap opened along the rail. Gaffalione urged War of Will through and the colt took command of the race, then withstood the late run of Everfast to win by 1 1/4 lengths.

"I just wanted a fair shot", said Casse, when asked if he wanted revenge after the Derby. "I wanted him to get his chance to show everyone how good he is, because he is a superhorse. You know, we were coming back in two weeks, and there were a lot of fresh shooters. So I am extremely proud. But a lot of people said, 'Oh, is this revenge?' No, I just wanted to win."

After the race, War of Will seemed to display signs of lameness in the winner's circle. Casse explained that the colt had a mild case of stringhalt, which causes the occasional involuntary upward flexion of a hind leg. "He has a kind of funny action behind", he said. "It can be there for a couple days, and it can go away. I thought after the race it exaggerated it a little more, but by the next morning he was fine."

Belmont Stakes

War of Will drew the ninth post position in the ten-horse field of the 2019 Belmont Stakes on June 9. The morning line odds had him at 2–1, behind favorite Tacitus at 9–5. His final odds were 3.65–1, again behind favorite Tacitus at 1.95–1. In the race, War of Will was fourth or fifth through the first 1 1/4 miles (2 km), before fading at the end to finish in ninth. Sir Winston won in a time of 2:28.30, with Tacitus second by a length, and War of Will 10 lengths back.

Jim Dandy

War of Will was given a brief layoff then returned in the Jim Dandy Stakes at Saratoga on July 27. Tacitus, the post-time favorite, stumbled at the start, leaving War of Will and Tax to set the pace. War of Will raced wide around the first turn while resisting Gaffalione's efforts to get him to relax. He took a two-length lead down the backstretch but started to lose ground around the final turn. War of Will finished fifth behind Tax and Tacitus.

Pennsylvania Derby

War of Will's next start was in the Pennsylvania Derby on September 22. Maximum Security was also targeting the race, but had to be withdrawn after suffering a bout of colic. In his absence, the race was considered wide open, with War of Will the 3-1 second choice in a field of six. He prompted the pace set by Mr. Money, but lost some ground turning for home that he struggled to make up in the stretch. Both horses were passed near the finish line by the late-running longshot Math Wizard. War of Will finished third, just holding off the late-running Improbable. "I was proud of him, and what I liked best was that he was in the race", said Casse. "He wanted to be there. Even in defeat, he never gave it up."

Breeders' Cup Classic

War of Will made his final start of the year in the 2019 Breeders' Cup Classic at Santa Anita Park on November 2. He set the early pace but tired as the field turned into the stretch and finished ninth behind Vino Rosso.

=== 2020: four-year-old season ===
The start of War of Will's four-year-old campaign was delayed by racetrack closures due to the COVID-19 pandemic. He finally made his debut on May 25, 2020, in the Shoemaker Mile Stakes over the turf course at Santa Anita. He faced several of the top turf horses in the country, including Group/Graded I stakes winners Without Parole, Raging Bull, Next Shares and River Boyne. He broke toward the rail and bumped with Voodoo Song, then settled in fourth place. He improved his position to second in midstretch but could not match the closing speed of several of the others, finishing fifth behind Raging Bull. He was disqualified to sixth for interference.

War of Will made his next start in the Maker's Mark Mile Stakes at Keeneland, rescheduled to July 10, where he was the third betting choice behind Raging Bull and Without Parole. Feeling that War of Will had been too eager in his previous starts, Casse decided to remove the colt's blinkers. Gaffalione credited the change for helping War of Will to relax, reserving more energy for the stretch drive. He rated in third position until mid-stretch, then kicked late and inched ahead of Parlor to win by a nose, with Raging Bull a neck back in third.

== Statistics ==
Date	Age	Distance	Surface (condition)	Race	Grade	Track	Odds	Field	Finish	Winning Time	Margin	Jockey	Ref
Aug 24, 2018	2	7 furlongs	Turf (good)	Maiden Special Weight		Woodbine	1.65*	12	3	1:23.59	(4 1/4 lengths)	Gary Boulanger	
Sep 16, 2018	2	1 mile	Turf (firm)	Summer Stakes	I	Woodbine	10.30	12	2	1:33.90	(3/4 lengths)	Joel Rosario	
Oct 7, 2018	2	1 1/16 miles	Turf (firm)	Bourbon Stakes	III	Keeneland	1.40*	13	4	1:45.10	(3/4 lengths)	Drayden Van Dyke	
Nov 2, 2018	2	1 mile	Turf (yielding)	Breeders' Cup Juvenile Turf	I	Churchill Downs	15.70	14	5	1:40.06	(3 1/2 lengths)	Joel Rosario	
Nov 24, 2018	2	1 1/16 miles	Dirt (sloppy)	Maiden special weight		Churchill Downs	2.10*	11	1	1:45.45	5 lengths	Tyler Gaffalione	
Jan 19, 2019	3	1 mile and 70 yards	Dirt (fast)	Lecomte Stakes	III	Fair Grounds	1.60*	12	1	1:43.44	4 lengths	Tyler Gaffalione	
Feb 16, 2019	3	1 1/16 miles	Dirt (fast)	Risen Star Stakes	II	Fair Grounds	1.00*	14	1	1:44.59	2 1/4 lengths	Tyler Gaffalione	
Mar 23, 2019	3	1 1/8 miles	Dirt (fast)	Louisiana Derby	II	Fair Grounds	0.80*	11	9	1:49.53	(12 lengths)	Tyler Gaffalione	
May 4, 2019	3	1 1/4 miles	Dirt (sloppy)	2019 Kentucky Derby	I	Churchill Downs	16.70	19	7 (Note: War of Will was promoted to seventh place after the disqualification of Maximum Security)	2:03.93	(4 1/2 lengths)	Tyler Gaffalione	
May 18, 2019	3	1 3/16 miles	Dirt (fast)	2019 Preakness Stakes	I	Pimlico	6.10	13	1	1:54.34	1 1/4 lengths	Tyler Gaffalione	
Jun 8, 2019	3	1 1/2 miles	Dirt (fast)	2019 Belmont Stakes	I	Belmont Park	3.65	10	9	2:28.30	(10 lengths)	Tyler Gaffalione	
Jul 27, 2019	3	1 1/8 miles	Dirt (fast)	Jim Dandy Stakes	II	Saratoga	3.20	6	5	1:49.28	(5 lengths)	Tyler Gaffalione	
Sep 21, 2019	3	1 1/8 miles	Dirt (fast)	Pennsylvania Derby	I	Parx	3.30	6	3	1:50.94	(1 1/4 lengths)	Tyler Gaffalione	
Nov 2, 2019	3	1 1/4 miles	Dirt (fast)	Breeders' Cup Classic	I	Santa Anita Park	16.00	11	9	2:02.80	(19 3/4 lengths)	Tyler Gaffalione	
May 25, 2020	4	1 mile	Turf (firm)	Shoemaker Mile	I	Santa Anita Park	6.10	10	6 (Note: Disqualified from fifth to sixth)	1:32.73	(3 1/4 lengths)	Tyler Gaffalione	
July 10, 2020	4	1 mile	Turf (firm)	Maker's Mark Mile Stakes	I	Keeneland	5.90	10	1	1:34.55	nose	Tyler Gaffalione	

An asterisk after the odds means War of Will was the post-time favorite.

== Stud career ==
War of Will entered stud in 2021 at Claiborne Farm in Kentucky where his fee was set at $20,000. He was relocated to Rockridge Stud in Hudson, New York for the 2026 breeding season and stood for a $5,000 fee.

=== Notable progeny ===
c = colt, f = filly, g = gelding

Foaled	Name	Sex	Major Wins
2024	U. S. S. Valor	c	Champagne Stakes

== Pedigree ==
Pedigree of War of Will, bay colt, April 17, 2016
Sire War Front 2002	Danzig; 1977	Northern Dancer	Nearctic
Sire War Front 2002	Danzig; 1977	Northern Dancer	Natalma
Sire War Front 2002	Danzig; 1977	Pas de Nom	Admiral's Voyage
Sire War Front 2002	Danzig; 1977	Pas de Nom	Petitioner
Sire War Front 2002	Starry Dreamer; 1994	Rubiano	Fappiano
Sire War Front 2002	Starry Dreamer; 1994	Rubiano	Ruby Slippers
Sire War Front 2002	Starry Dreamer; 1994	Lara's Star	Forli
Sire War Front 2002	Starry Dreamer; 1994	Lara's Star	True Reality
Dam Visions of Clarity (IRE) 2000	Sadler's Wells; 1981	Northern Dancer	Nearctic
Dam Visions of Clarity (IRE) 2000	Sadler's Wells; 1981	Northern Dancer	Natalma
Dam Visions of Clarity (IRE) 2000	Sadler's Wells; 1981	Fairy Bridge	Bold Reason
Dam Visions of Clarity (IRE) 2000	Sadler's Wells; 1981	Fairy Bridge	Special
Dam Visions of Clarity (IRE) 2000	Imperfect Circle; 1988	Riverman	Never Bend
Dam Visions of Clarity (IRE) 2000	Imperfect Circle; 1988	Riverman	River Lady
Dam Visions of Clarity (IRE) 2000	Imperfect Circle; 1988	Aviance (IRE)	Northfields
Dam Visions of Clarity (IRE) 2000	Imperfect Circle; 1988	Aviance (IRE)	Minnie Hauk (family: 8-f)

War of Will is inbred 3 x 3 to Northern Dancer, meaning Northern Dancer appears twice in the third generation of his pedigree.

== See also ==
- List of racehorses
