= Kentucky Horse Racing Commission =

Kentucky state agency

Agency overview
- Formed: 1906; 120 years ago
- Jurisdiction: Government of Kentucky
- Headquarters: Lexington, Kentucky
- Agency executives: Jonathan Rabinowitz, Chairman; Jamie Eads, Executive Director
- Parent department: Kentucky Public Protection Cabinet
- Website: khrc.ky.gov

The Kentucky Horse Racing Commission is the state agency responsible for regulating horse racing in the U.S. commonwealth of Kentucky. The agency was established in 1906, making it the oldest state racing commission in the United States.

== Agency overview ==
The commission consists of fifteen members appointed by the governor of Kentucky. Three of the members, the secretaries of the Public Protection Cabinet (which oversees the commission), the Tourism, Arts and Heritage Cabinet, and the Economic Development Cabinet serve as ex officio members. Each member serves a four-year term.

As the agency overseeing horse racing in the state, the commission holds jurisdiction over the various aspects of the industry. These include betting at racetracks, equine medication, and ensuring the safety of jockeys. The commission's various regulations are enforced by the state's stewards.

== Oversight of the Kentucky Derby ==
Though the commission regulates the entire horse racing industry in Kentucky, it is best known for its regulation of the Kentucky Derby, one of the three Triple Crown races. The agency's decisions regarding this race attract significant media coverage.

Most notable are the two instances wherein the commission disqualified the winning horses. The first occurred in 1968 with the horse Dancer's Image. Following the conclusion of the race, the agency conducted urine samples of each horse in the race, as per protocol. The results for Dancer's Image came back positive for phenylbutazone, a pain reliever banned in Kentucky at the time. As a result, the horse was disqualified following the race, even though owner Peter D. Fuller denied any knowledge of treating the horse with the drug. He later claimed that the horse had been drugged by those displeased with Fuller's friendship with Coretta Scott King. Fuller later appealed the decision all the way to the Kentucky Court of Appeals. The court reviewed the evidence and concluded that the disqualification was merited, affirming the commission's decision.

The second occurred in 2019 with the horse Maximum Security. Unlike in 1968, where the disqualification occurred days after the race, Maximum Security was disqualified on the day of due to an infraction committed during the race. At the conclusion of the race, the connections of the second-place finisher, Country House filed an objection alleging that Maximum Security had unfairly impeded their horse during the race. Upon reviewing the instant replay of the race for around thirty minutes, the commission's chief steward Barbara Borden and two other stewards affirmed the objection and disqualified Maximum Security. The decision provoked significant controversy, as many felt Maximum Security had outperformed the rest of the field. Critics included then-President Donald Trump, who blamed political correctness for the ruling. Gary West, Maximum Security's owner, appealed the decision in federal court, but both the U.S. District Court for the Eastern District of Kentucky and the U.S. Sixth Circuit Court of Appeals dismissed the case for lack of jurisdiction. In a 2021 interview, Borden noted that reviewing the race through instant replay was standard procedure and only took a closer look at the alleged interference following official notice of an objection. Others involved in horse racing, including trainers Todd Pletcher and Shug McGaughey, defended the stewards' decision, with McGaughey stating the interference could have been much worse.

== See also ==
- Horse racing in the United States
- Sports betting in the United States
