= Jason Servis =

American horse trainer

Personal information
- Born: April 2, 1957 (age 69) Charles Town, West Virginia
- Occupation: Trainer

Horse racing career
- Sport: Horse racing
- Career wins: 1,306

Major racing wins
- Fashion Stakes (2004); Violet Handicap (2008); Pennsylvania Governor's Cup Stakes (2013, 2014); Bowling Green Handicap (2014); Sapling Stakes (2015); Withers Stakes (2016); Black-Eyed Susan Stakes (2017); Champagne Stakes (2017); Comely Stakes (2017); Sanford Stakes (2017); Stymie Stakes (2017); Union Avenue Stakes (2017, 2018); Fall Highweight Handicap (2018); Jerome Stakes (2018); Mike Lee Stakes (2018); Pasco Stakes (2018); Florida Derby (2019); Haskell Invitational (2019)

Significant horses
- Uncle Benny, Maximum Security, Firenze Fire

Jason J. Servis (born April 2, 1957) is an American trainer of thoroughbred racehorses. A multiple graded stakes-winning trainer, Servis is best known for having trained Maximum Security, who finished first in the 2019 Kentucky Derby but was disqualified for interference.

He is a brother of trainer John Servis, of Smarty Jones fame.

In March 2020, Servis was arrested after having been indicted along with 27 other people by federal authorities on charges related to manufacturing, procuring, distributing and administering illegal substances to racehorses. Servis's trial was scheduled to begin in early 2023, but in December 2022 he accepted a plea deal from the U.S. District Attorney's Office by pleading guilty to two new charges of misbranding and adulterating chemical substances intended to be used in racehorses. The original charges, which carried a potential prison term of 25 years, were dropped. On July 26, 2023, Servis was sentenced to four years in prison, fined $30,000, and ordered to pay restitution. He began serving his sentence on November 1, 2023 at FPC Pensacola.
