= Maximum Security (horse) =

American Thoroughbred racehorse

- Sire: New Year's Day
- Grandsire: Street Cry
- Dam: Lil Indy
- Damsire: Anasheed
- Sex: Stallion
- Foaled: May 14, 2016
- Country: United States
- Color: Bay
- Breeder: Gary and Mary West
- Owner: Austin Nicks of Nicks Thoroughbreds
- Trainer: Jason Servis (2018–March 2020); Bob Baffert
- Record: 14: 9–2–0
- Earnings: $2,431,900

Major wins
- Florida Derby (2019); Haskell Invitational (2019); Bold Ruler Handicap (2019); Cigar Mile (2019); San Diego Handicap (2020); Pacific Classic (2020)

Awards
- American Champion Three-Year-Old Male Horse (2019)

Maximum Security (foaled May 14, 2016) is a champion American Thoroughbred racehorse who was the 2019 Champion Three-Year-Old after winning the Florida Derby, Haskell Invitational, Bold Ruler Handicap, and Cigar Mile. Maximum Security crossed the finish line first in the 2019 Kentucky Derby, but was disqualified for interference.

As a four-year-old in 2020, he won the inaugural running of the Saudi Cup in January. In 2023 his trainer Jason Servis pleaded guilty to two charges related to the administration of performance-enhancing drugs to his stable and was sentenced to 48 months in prison. Maximum Security was administered a designer drug that was considered undetectable. He was transferred to the barn of Bob Baffert and returned to racing on July 25, when he won the San Diego Handicap, followed by a win in the Pacific Classic.

== Background ==
Maximum Security is a bay stallion bred in Kentucky by Gary and Mary West, for whom he races as a homebred. He was sired by New Year's Day, who won the 2014 Breeders' Cup Juvenile for the Wests. As a sire New Year's Day was considered a disappointment and was sold in late 2018 to a Brazilian syndicate for a reported $5 million: Maximum Security subsequently became his first graded stakes winner. Maximum Security's dam Lil Indy, by Anasheed, is a half-sister to multiple Grade I winner Flat Out.

Maximum Security was originally trained by Jason Servis, known for his high winning percentage. Servis credited his success to unconventional training methods with a focus on slow, regular gallops with brief bursts of speed at the end, compared to the faster but less frequent workouts by most other trainers. After Servis was indicted in March 2020 for doping related allegations, Maximum Security was moved to the barn of Bob Baffert.

== Racing career ==
Maximum Security had "unspecified physical issues" as a two-year-old and did not make his first start until December 20, 2018, in a maiden claiming race. He won in commanding fashion by 9 3/4 lengths. In that race, he could have been claimed for $16,000, but fortunately for the Wests was not.

=== Three-year-old season ===
Maximum Security began his three-year-old campaign by winning two starter optional claiming races at Gulfstream Park in early 2019, both of them over sprint distances, by a combined distance of 24 3/4 lengths. He was then stepped up in both class and distance when entered in the Grade I Florida Derby at a distance of 1 1/8 miles on March 30. Maximum Security went to the early lead and set a reasonable pace, trailed by longshot Bodexpress. He was never challenged and won by 3 1/2 lengths, with favorites Hidden Scroll and Code of Honor well back. Maximum Security earned 100 points on the 2019 Road to the Kentucky Derby, instantly qualifying him for the Kentucky Derby.

==== Kentucky Derby ====
In the Kentucky Derby, Maximum Security set the pace of the race. Going around the far turn, Maximum Security swerved out from the rail while still on the lead, impeding the progress of several other horses. While Maximum Security regained his momentum and crossed the finish line first, he was disqualified to 17th place after 20 minutes of deliberation by the stewards. Second-place Country House, who went off at odds of 65–1, was awarded first. Maximum Security was the first horse to cross the finish line first in the Kentucky Derby only to be disqualified for an on-track infraction. The only other winner to be disqualified in the Kentucky Derby up until that point in time had been Dancer's Image, who was disqualified in 1968 for a drug infraction.

The disqualification was controversial, especially in the Derby which is often a roughly run race due to the large field. Jockey Luis Saez said the horse had shied away from the noise of the infield crowd, but was immediately brought under control. Maximum Security did not materially affect Country House, who was awarded the victory. However, his swerve did affect several other horses and could have caused a major accident if he had clipped heels with another horse. Saez was subsequently suspended for 15 days for "failure to control his mount".

On May 14, 2019, the owners of Maximum Security sued in U.S. District Court in Frankfort, Kentucky, seeking to reinstate the win and distribute purse money based on the actual order of finish. On June 8, the Kentucky Horse Racing Commission filed a motion requesting dismissal of the lawsuit, stating that it "threatens to turn the 'most exciting two minutes in sports' into tedious, protracted litigation." In November 2019, the lawsuit was dismissed, citing "the stewards’ decision in determining fouls and disqualifications of horses is final and not subject to appeal".

==== Post-Derby races ====
Maximum Security's owners chose not to enter him in the Preakness or the Belmont. He returned to the track on June 16, when he was made 1-20 favorite for the Pegasus Stakes at Monmouth Park, but sustained an upset defeat as he was beaten by a length by King for a Day.

On July 20, Maximum Security was entered in the Haskell Invitational Stakes at Monmouth Park, going off as the 4-5 favorite in a field of six. He rated in third behind the early pace set by Bethlehem Road and King for a Day, tracked by Mucho Gusto. Around the far turn, first Bethlehem Road and then King for a Day dropped back, leaving Maximum Security and Mucho Gusto to battle for the lead. At the eighth pole, Maximum Security was a head in front but Mucho Gusto appeared to have the momentum. Maximum Security rallied and drew away to win by 1 1/4 lengths. He then faced a stewards' inquiry after he appeared to bear in slightly on the far turn when King for a Day started to tire. However, the stewards ruled that there was no cause for disqualification.

The win moved Maximum Security back into contention for champion three-year-old honors. However, he missed a planned start in the Travers Stakes because he was not training up to expectations. "I don't like where he's at," said Servis on August 15. "He's not eating the way I want him to eat, and he's not carrying the weight I'd like to see him carry."

He was next entered in the Pennsylvania Derby, but was scratched 5 days before the race due to a large colon nephrosplenic entrapment. He was rushed to the Mid-Atlantic Equine Clinic where he was diagnosed with colic. "He just got his [colon] displaced tightly enough that it was extremely painful," said Gasiorowski. "He was sent to our clinic immediately and we managed to get him to correct without doing surgery."

His connections gave him time to recover, and ruled out his participation in the 2019 Breeders' Cup. They instead entered him in the Bold Ruler Handicap on October 26, which he won in front running fashion by 1 3/4 lengths. "I knew we were going to get criticized for running in a Grade III race by ignoramuses who don't know that after a horse has colic and is off for three months, you don't want to start him at a mile and a quarter," said West. "But I'm immune to that. Jason knows the right thing to do with the horse, and I know the right thing to do with the horse."

Maximum Security finished his three-year-old campaign by winning the Cigar Mile Handicap on December 7 at Aqueduct Racetrack as the 6-5 favorite. His main rival was considered to be Spun to Run, who had won the Breeders' Cup Dirt Mile. Maximum Security went to the early lead and was soon joined by Spun to Run. The two raced together for the first three-quarters of a mile until Maximum Security started to pull away at the head of the stretch. He won by 3 1/2 lengths in a time of 1:36.46.

Gary West told The Blood-Horse in December 2019 that he was keeping the horse in training for 2020. He was leaning towards running Maximum Security in the inaugural Saudi Cup, to be held on King Abdulaziz Racetrack in Riyadh, Saudi Arabia on February 29. He had initially considered the Pegasus World Cup at Gulfstream Park in January, but ruled that out after it was announced that its purse would be cut from $9 million to $3 million.

Maximum Security was named the American Champion Three-Year-Old Male Horse at the 49th annual Eclipse Awards with 217 out of 241 votes. "It's a special honor for Mary and me," said Gary West. "It will not make up for what happened in the Kentucky Derby, but it's a nice way to close the year."

=== Four-year-old season ===
On January 1, 2020, it was announced that Coolmore Stud had purchased a 50% share in Maximum Security.

Maximum Security was shipped to Saudi Arabia in February 2020 for the inaugural $20 million Saudi Cup, run on February 29 over a distance of nine furlongs. The field contained multiple Grade/Group One winners from around the world including Midnight Bisou (American Champion Older Female Horse), Mucho Gusto (2020 Pegasus World Cup winner), Benbatl (2019 Caulfield Stakes winner), McKinzie (2019 Alysheba Stakes and 2019 Whitney Stakes winner), Chrysoberyl (undefeated 2019 Japan Dirt Derby winner), and Gold Dream (2017 Champions Cup winner). Capezzano set the early pace, followed closely by Mucho Gusto with Maximum Security tracking them a few lengths behind. Mucho Gusto moved to the lead as they entered the far turn, then swung very wide as they entered the stretch. Maximum Security, who had started his move on the outside, switched paths and started to make up ground. He passed Mucho Gusto with about 100 yards remaining, then held off Midnight Bisou, who made a late run along the rail. "It was a tough race but we did it," said Saez. "For a second I thought we were going to be beaten but he has such a big heart. He's the toughest horse I've ridden."

After Servis was indicted in March for doping allegations, Maximum Security was transferred to the barn of Bob Baffert. He was given an extensive exam that revealed some minor lameness but no serious long-term damage. He was given a layoff to recover and also to ensure that any drugs were cleared from his system, then resumed galloping on April 29.

He made his first start for Baffert in the San Diego Handicap at Del Mar on July 25, carrying top weight of 127 pounds. He took the early lead around the first turn but was then challenged by Midcourt as they moved into the backstretch. Maximum Security dropped back then shifted to the outside around the final turn and started to make up ground. Midcourt fought back and the two horses dueled down the stretch, with Maximum Security winning by a neck. "I knew I didn't have him really drummed up for this race," said Baffert. "He won today when he had every reason to get beat. He showed what a great horse he is today."

His next start was the Pacific Classic Stakes at Del Mar Racetrack, where he was the 2-5 favorite in a field of six that included Higher Power, who had won the race in 2019, and multiple graded stakes winners Midcourt and Sharp Samurai. Maximum Security broke sharply and set a moderate pace of :23.93 for the first quarter-mile and :47.98 for the half. When Sharp Samurai and Higher Power tried to challenge him on the final turn, he responded. Nearing the quarter pole he began to edge away from Sharp Samurai, and won going away by 1 1/2 lengths. This gave him an automatic berth into the Breeders' Cup Classic.

On September 26, he raced in the 2020 Awesome Again Stakes. This was a highly anticipated match up between Maximum Security and his stablemate Improbable, who had won the Grade 1 Hollywood Gold Cup and Grade 1 Whitney Stakes earlier in the year. Maximum Security stalked the pace set by Take The One O One, until the far turn, when Improbable rallied from last to take the lead. Maximum Security briefly tried to engage his stablemate, but he couldn't match Improbable and finished in second place.

In the Breeders' Cup Classic on November 7 in Keeneland he was one of the favorites, but he lost ground in the last corner and finished fifth. His stablemates Authentic and Improbable finished 1st and 2nd.

== Racing statistics ==
Date	Race	Racecourse	Grade	Distance	Finish	Margin	Time	Weight	Odds	Jockey	Ref
Dec 20, 2018	Maiden	Gulfstream Park		6 1/2 Furlongs	1	9 3/4 Lengths	1:16.84	115 lbs	2.70	Romero Maragh	
Jan 24, 2019	Allowance	Gulfstream Park		6 Furlongs	1	6 1/2 Lengths	1:09.93	115 lbs	0.30*	Romero Maragh	
Feb 20, 2019	Allowance	Gulfstream Park		7 Furlongs	1	18 1/4 Lengths	1:21.72	124 lbs	0.10*	Irad Ortiz Jr.	
Mar 30, 2019	Florida Derby	Gulfstream Park	I	1 1/8 miles	1	3 1/2 Lengths	1:48.86	122 lbs	4.80	Luis Saez	
May 4, 2019	Kentucky Derby	Churchill Downs	I	1 1/4 miles	17 (DQ) (Note: Maximum Security finished first, but was disqualified for interference on the far turn.)	1 3/4 Lengths	2:03.93	126 lbs	4.50	Luis Saez	
Jun 16, 2019	Pegasus Stakes	Monmouth Park	I	1 1/16 mile	2	(1 Length)	1:42.59	123 lbs	0.05*	Luis Saez	
Jul 20, 2019	Haskell Invitational Stakes	Monmouth Park	I	1 1/8 mile	1	1 1/4 Lengths	1:47.56	120 lbs	0.80*	Luis Saez	
Oct 26, 2019	Bold Ruler Handicap	Belmont Park	I	7 Furlongs	1	1 3/4 Lengths	1:20.76	121 lbs	0.60*	Luis Saez	
Dec 7, 2019	Cigar Mile Handicap	Aqueduct Racetrack	I	1 mile	1	3 1/2 Lengths	1:36.46	122 lbs	1.30*	Luis Saez	
Feb 29, 2020	Saudi Cup	King Abdulaziz Racetrack	N/A	1,800 meters	Unplaced (DQ) (Note: Maximum Security crossed the line first, but was disqualified following an investigation by the Jockey Club of Saudi Arabia.)	1/2 Length	1:50.59	126 lbs	5/2*	Luis Saez	
Jul 25, 2020	San Diego Handicap	Santa Anita Park	II	1 1/16 mile	1	Nose	1:44.54	127 lbs	0.40*	Abel Cedillo	
Aug 22, 2020	Pacific Classic Stakes	Del Mar Racetrack	I	1 1/4 mile	1	3 Lengths	2:01.24	124 lbs	0.40*	Abel Cedillo	
Sep 26, 2020	Awesome Again Stakes	Santa Anita Park	I	1 1/8 mile	2	(4 1/2 Lengths)	1:49.01	126 lbs	1.80	Luis Saez	
Nov 7, 2020	Breeders' Cup Classic	Keeneland	I	1 1/4 mile	5	(5 1/4 Lengths)	1:59.60	126 lbs	4.40	Luis Saez	

== Doping allegations ==
Maximum Security was specifically named as one of the horses that had been administered performance-enhancing drugs when trainer Jason Servis was indicted on March 9, 2020. Maximum Security was allegedly administered a designer drug, SGF-1000, "intended to promote tissue repair and increase a horse's stamina and endurance." The FBI intercepted a phone call where Servis indicated concern that Maximum Security would test positive after being administered the drug shortly before a random drug test on June 5, 2019. Servis was advised that there was "no test for it (SGF-1000) in America", but that the test might show a false positive for a different drug, "dex" (assumed to be Dexamethasone). A veterinarian subsequently agreed to alter Maximum Security's records to falsely show the horse was administered "dex" to explain any such result.

Because of the charges, some industry leaders questioned whether Maximum Security should be stripped of the Eclipse Award he won as a three-year-old, especially if subsequent testing revealed previously undetected drug positives. The owners of Midnight Bisou (second to Maximum Security in the Saudi Cup) called for his disqualification from that race. Following Servis' guilty plea in December 2022, owner Gary West released a statement saying that he would support a disqualification of Maximum Security from his Saudi Cup victory by racing officials in Saudi Arabia, saying that it would be the correct decision. The Jockey Club of Saudi Arabia later announced that they would assess their ability to conclude the 2020 Saudi Cup investigation "in a robust and comprehensive fashion." In January 2024 the Jockey Club of Saudi Arabia formally recommended Maximum Security's disqualification, claiming that Servis committed "substantial breaches of the rules." The matter was referred to the Stewards' Committee. On August 2, 2024, Maximum Security was formally disqualified from the 2020 Saudi Cup and Midnight Bisou was elevated to first place.

== Pedigree ==
Pedigree of Maximum Security, bay colt, May 14, 2016
Sire New Year's Day	Street Cry	Machiavellian	Mr. Prospector
Sire New Year's Day	Street Cry	Machiavellian	Coup de Folie
Sire New Year's Day	Street Cry	Helen Street	Troy
Sire New Year's Day	Street Cry	Helen Street	Waterway
Sire New Year's Day	Justwhistledixie	Dixie Union	Dixieland Band
Sire New Year's Day	Justwhistledixie	Dixie Union	Shes Tops
Sire New Year's Day	Justwhistledixie	General Jeanne	Honour and Glory
Sire New Year's Day	Justwhistledixie	General Jeanne	Ahpo Hel
Dam Lil Indy	Anasheed	A.P. Indy	Seattle Slew
Dam Lil Indy	Anasheed	A.P. Indy	Weekend Surprise
Dam Lil Indy	Anasheed	Flagbird	Nureyev
Dam Lil Indy	Anasheed	Flagbird	Up The Flagpole
Dam Lil Indy	Cresta Lil	Cresta Rider	Northern Dancer
Dam Lil Indy	Cresta Lil	Cresta Rider	Thoroly Blue
Dam Lil Indy	Cresta Lil	Rugosa	Double Jay
Dam Lil Indy	Cresta Lil	Rugosa	Rose (family: 1-n)

== See also ==
- List of racehorses
