= Tyler Gaffalione =

American jockey (born 1994)

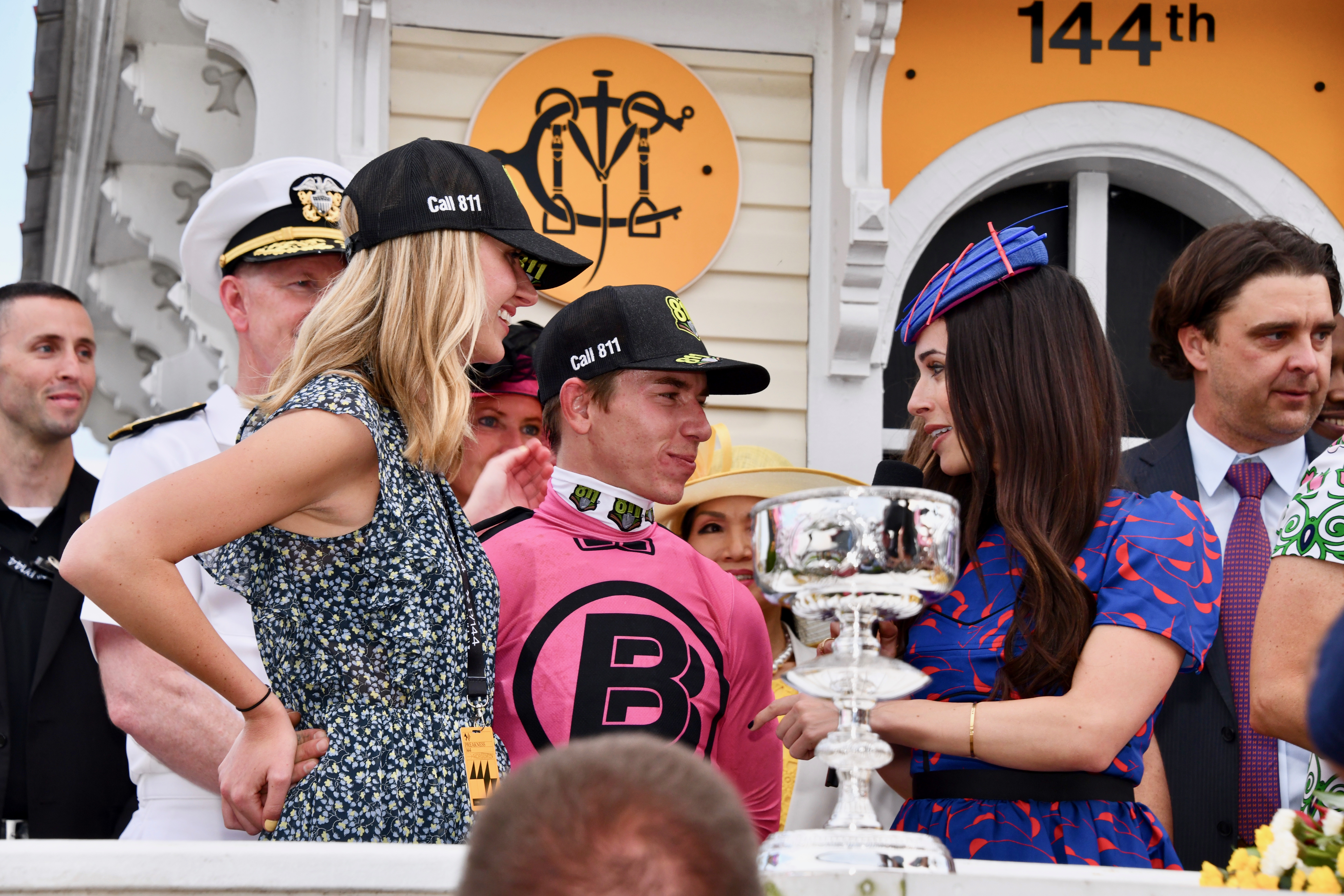
- Tyler Gaffalione at the trophy presentation for the 2019 Preakness Stakes

Personal information
- Born: September 12, 1994 (age 31) Davie, Florida, USA
- Occupation: Jockey

Horse racing career
- Sport: Horse racing
- Career wins: 2,377 (ongoing)

Major racing wins
- U.S. Triple Crown series: Preakness Stakes (2019) Rampart Stakes (2015); Sunrise Handicap (2015); H. Allen Jerkens Stakes (2016, 2017)); My Dear Girl Stakes (2016); In Reality Stakes (2017); Matron Stakes (2017); Jeff Ruby/Spiral Stakes (2017, 2019); W. L. McKnight Handicap (2017); Bourbonette Oaks (2018); Miss Preakness Stakes (2018); Miami Mile Stakes (2017); Fort Marcy Stakes (2018); La Troienne Stakes (2018); Shadwell Turf Mile Stakes (2018); Kelso Handicap (2018); Raven Run Stakes (2018); Lecomte Stakes (2019); Risen Star Stakes (2019); Matriarch Stakes (2019); Pegasus World Cup Turf (2020, 2025); Alabama Stakes (2020); Coaching Club American Oaks (2020); Indian Summer Stakes (2021); Florida Derby (2022); Turf Classic Stakes (2022); Arlington Million (2022); Del Mar Oaks (2022); Alcibiades Stakes (2022); Turf Classic Stakes (2022); Breeders' Cup Turf Sprint (2022); Breeders' Cup Juvenile Fillies (2022); Gulfstream Park Mile Stakes (2023); Rachel Alexandra Stakes (2023); Azeri Stakes (2023); Godolphin Mile (2023); Kentucky Oaks (2023); Acorn Stakes (2023); Forego Stakes (2023)

Racing awards
- U.S. Champion Apprentice Jockey (2015)

Significant horses
- Got Stormy, Caravel, Pretty Mischievous, Salty, Gunite, War of Will

Tyler Gaffalione (born September 12, 1994, in Davie, Florida) is an American jockey. He won the Eclipse Award for the 2015 U.S. Champion Apprentice Jockey. He won the 2019 Preakness Stakes aboard War of Will.

== Background ==
Born in Davie, Florida, Gaffalione is the son of former jockey Steve Gaffalione, who rode from 1978 through 1998. He was four when he got his first pony and spent much time on the backstretch with his father. Gaffalione attended Western and Sunlake High School, graduating from the latter in 2013.

== Racing career ==
Tyler Gaffalione rode his first winner in the third race of his career on September 7, 2014, at Gulfstream Park. A track that became a favorite, on May 3, 2015, he won five races on a single Gulfstream Park racecard then on July 4, 2017, he tied Hall of Fame jockey Jerry Bailey's 19-year-old record by winning seven races on a single Gulfstream Park racecard. On June 30, 2018, Tyler Gaffalione captured his sixth riding title at Gulfstream Park.

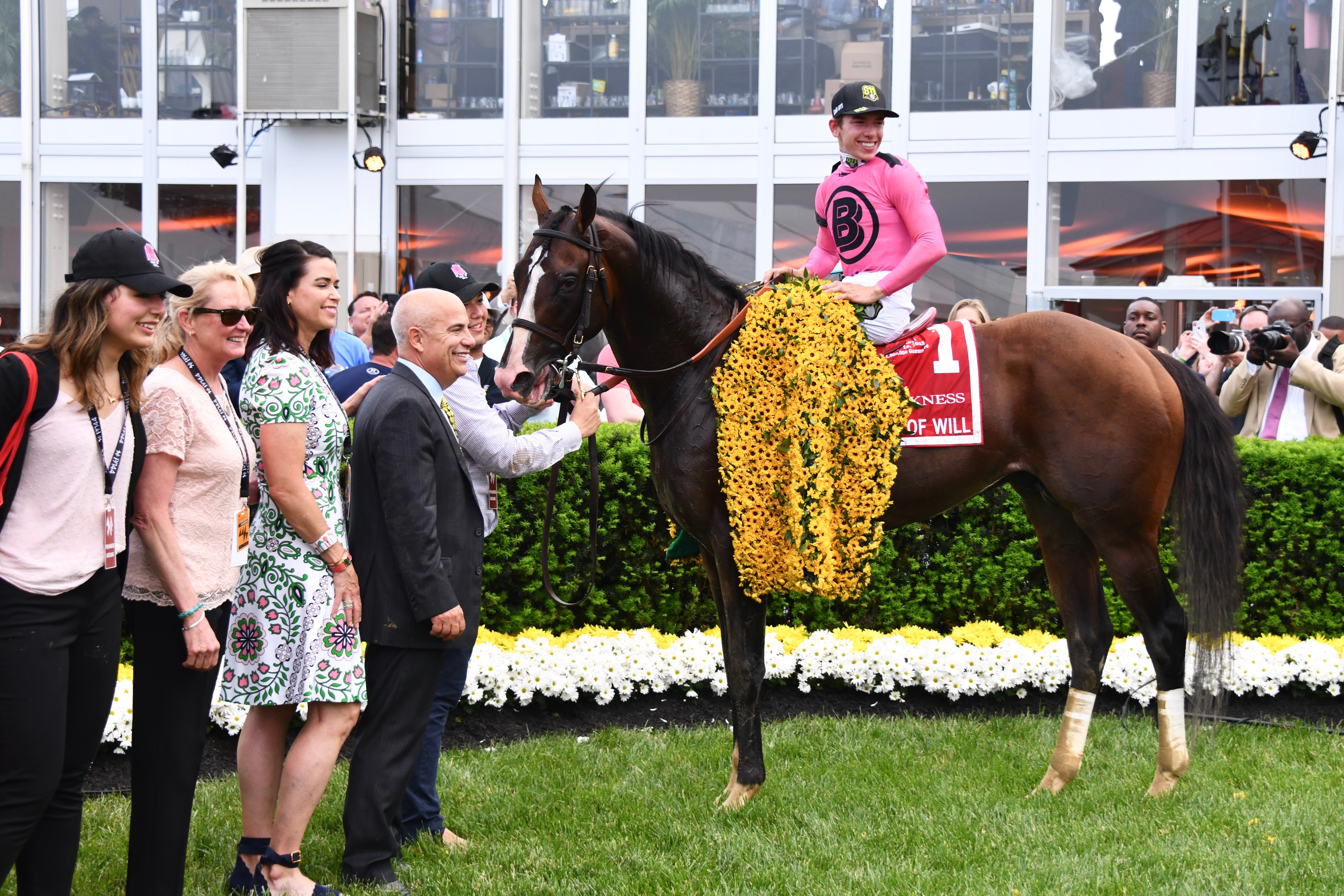
Gaffalione aboard War of Will in the Preakness winner's circle

In 2018, Tyler Gaffalione was riding primarily at Gulfstream Park and Saratoga Race Course. He earned his first Grade I victory in the La Troienne aboard Salty and finished in eleventh place in the National Earnings list.

In 2019, he teamed up with trainer Mark Casse to win the Preakness Stakes with War of Will. In 2026, he rode late-qualifier Ocelli to a surprise third-place finish in the 2026 Kentucky Derby.

== Year-end charts ==
Chart (2014–present)	Rank by earnings
National Earnings List for Jockeys 2014	439
National Earnings List for Jockeys 2015	33
National Earnings List for Jockeys 2016	28
National Earnings List for Jockeys 2017	12
National Earnings List for Jockeys 2018	11
National Earnings List for Jockeys 2019	10
National Earnings List for Jockeys 2020	4
National Earnings List for Jockeys 2021	6
