= Country House (horse) =

American-bred Thoroughbred racehorse

- Sire: Lookin at Lucky
- Grandsire: Smart Strike
- Dam: Quake Lake
- Damsire: War Chant
- Sex: Stallion
- Foaled: May 8, 2016; Midway, Kentucky, U.S.
- Country: United States
- Color: Chestnut
- Breeder: J. V. Shields, Jr.
- Owner: Shields, Jr., Mrs. J. V., McFadden, Jr., E. J. M. and LNJ Foxwoods
- Trainer: Bill Mott
- Record: 7: 2–2–1
- Earnings: $2,120,175

Major wins
- Triple Crown classic race wins: Kentucky Derby (2019)

Country House (foaled May 8, 2016) is an American Thoroughbred racehorse who won the 2019 Kentucky Derby after the disqualification of Maximum Security.

Country House's win came as result of an objection call from jockey Flavien Prat. Even though Maximum Security crossed the finish line before Country House, Maximum Security was disqualified for interference with several horses and causing a near-spill. At odds of 65–1, Country House had the third highest odds of any Kentucky Derby winner, after Donerail in 1913 and Rich Strike in 2022.

== Background ==
Country House is a chestnut stallion bred in Kentucky by Joseph V. Shields Jr. He was sired by Lookin at Lucky, the winner of the 2010 Preakness Stakes.

Country House's dam Quake Lake, a daughter of War Chant, was an allowance winner who won two of her six races. She is a half sister to Prince of Wales Stakes winner Breaking Lucky, who was also sired by Lookin at Lucky and is therefore a close relative of Country House.

Country House was foaled at Three Chimneys Farm on May 8, 2016. Quake Lake died shortly after giving birth to him, and so he was raised by a nurse mare. He moved to Lane's End Farm as a weanling to prepare for sale as a yearling. Due to his late birth date, he needed more time to develop physically, but was "always a correct, balanced and athletic individual" according to Andy Howard, the assistant yearling manager at Lane's End. Country House was entered in the 2017 Keeneland September yearling sale because owner Shields usually sold his yearling colts. However, he was withdrawn from the sale and kept.

Original owner Joseph Shields died in October 2018, shortly after Country House's first race, and Country House's ownership was taken over by Shields' wife, Maury, and his nephew, Guinness McFadden. Country House was trained by William I. Mott.

== Racing career ==
Country House's first race was on turf at Belmont Park on October 6, 2018, in which he was never a factor. Country House won his first race in his third start, a maiden special weight race at Gulfstream Park on January 17, 2019. After his maiden victory, LNJ Foxwoods purchased an interest in him. He finished 2nd at Risen Star, 3rd at the Arkansas Derby, and 4th at the Louisiana Derby.

In the Kentucky Derby on May 4, Maximum Security crossed the finish line first, but was judged to have impeded War of Will and Long Range Toddy when he swerved into their path, causing them to check strides. As a result, Maximum Security was disqualified, and Country House, who had crossed the finish line second, was declared the winner.

On May 7, Country House was ruled out of running in the 2019 Preakness Stakes, due to his trainer detecting a virus. This marked the first time the Kentucky Derby winner did not race in the Preakness Stakes since 1996.

Country House went on to develop a series of ailments that led to his retirement. According to a statement by McFadden's Blackwood Stables, he was first "diagnosed with proximal suspensory ligament desmitis on both front fetlocks" in June. Country House then experienced complications, leading to his hospitalization at Rood and Riddle Equine Hospital on July 1 for an infection on his lower right fore. Because the right fore was not load bearing during his recovery from the infection, his left fore had to bear the extra weight and developed laminitis. Over the next several months, the laminitis was stabilized and Country House was then turned out to pasture. He fully recovered but did not race again.

== Stud career ==
Country House began his career as a stallion at Darby Dan Farm in Lexington, Kentucky in 2021 for a fee of $7,500. In 2026, his fee was set to $5,000.

== Pedigree ==
Pedigree of Country House, chestnut colt, foaled May 8, 2016
Sire Lookin At Lucky b. 2007	Smart Strike b. 1992	Mr Prospector b. 1970	Raise a Native
Sire Lookin At Lucky b. 2007	Smart Strike b. 1992	Mr Prospector b. 1970	Gold Digger
Sire Lookin At Lucky b. 2007	Smart Strike b. 1992	Classy 'n Smart b. 1981	Smarten
Sire Lookin At Lucky b. 2007	Smart Strike b. 1992	Classy 'n Smart b. 1981	No Class*
Sire Lookin At Lucky b. 2007	Private Feeling b. 1999	Belong To Me dkb/br. 1989	Danzig*
Sire Lookin At Lucky b. 2007	Private Feeling b. 1999	Belong To Me dkb/br. 1989	Belonging
Sire Lookin At Lucky b. 2007	Private Feeling b. 1999	Regal Feeling b. 1986	Clever Trick
Sire Lookin At Lucky b. 2007	Private Feeling b. 1999	Regal Feeling b. 1986	Sharp Belle
Dam Quake Lake b. 2006	War Chant dkb/br. 1997	Danzig* b. 1977	Northern Dancer
Dam Quake Lake b. 2006	War Chant dkb/br. 1997	Danzig* b. 1977	Pas de Nom
Dam Quake Lake b. 2006	War Chant dkb/br. 1997	Hollywood Wildcat dkb/br. 1990	Kris S.
Dam Quake Lake b. 2006	War Chant dkb/br. 1997	Hollywood Wildcat dkb/br. 1990	Miss Wildcatter
Dam Quake Lake b. 2006	Shooting Party gr/ro. 1998	Sky Classic ch. 1987	Nijinsky
Dam Quake Lake b. 2006	Shooting Party gr/ro. 1998	Sky Classic ch. 1987	No Class*
Dam Quake Lake b. 2006	Shooting Party gr/ro. 1998	Ayanka gr. 1991	Jade Hunter
Dam Quake Lake b. 2006	Shooting Party gr/ro. 1998	Ayanka gr. 1991	Al's Charm (Family 9-f)

- Country House is inbred 4s × 3d to the stallion Danzig, meaning that he appears fourth generation on the sire side of his pedigree and third generation on the dam side of his pedigree. Country House is also inbred 4s × 4d to No Class, meaning he appears fourth generation on the sire side of his pedigree and fourth generation on the dam side of his pedigree.

== See also ==
- List of racehorses
- Forward Pass (horse), declared winner of the 1968 Kentucky Derby following a disqualification
