= 2019 Kentucky Derby =

Horse race

145th Kentucky Derby
- Kentucky Derby
- Grade I stakes race
- Location: Churchill Downs; Louisville, Kentucky, United States
- Date: May 4, 2019
- Winning horse: Country House (by disqualification)
- Winning time: 2:03.93
- Final odds: 65–1
- Jockey: Flavien Prat
- Trainer: William I. Mott
- Owner: Shields, McFadden & LNJ Foxwoods
- Conditions: Sloppy
- Surface: Dirt
- Attendance: 150,729

The 2019 Kentucky Derby (officially, the 2019 Kentucky Derby presented by Woodford Reserve) was the 145th running of the Kentucky Derby, and took place on Saturday, May 4, 2019, in Louisville, Kentucky. The field was open to 20 horses, who qualified for the race by earning points on the 2019 Road to the Kentucky Derby. The Derby is held annually on the first Saturday in May, at the end of the two-week-long Kentucky Derby Festival. It is a Grade I stakes race for three-year-old Thoroughbreds at a distance of 1 1/4 miles (2.0 km), and has been run at Churchill Downs racetrack since its inception in 1875. The purse for 2019 was increased from US$2 million to US$3 million.

The race was broadcast by NBC, with coverage by NBCSN of undercard races beginning at 12:30 pm EDT and main network coverage of pre-race activities starting at 2:30 pm EDT. Cleveland Browns star quarterback Baker Mayfield provided the "Riders Up".

Although Maximum Security crossed the finish line before long shot Country House, Maximum Security was disqualified and the victory was awarded to Country House after Maximum Security was judged to have cost War of Will and Long Range Toddy a better placing in the race when he swerved into their path, causing them to check strides.

== Qualification ==
The Kentucky Derby is only open to three-year-old Thoroughbreds, thus entrants in the 2019 race were foaled in 2016, mostly as part of the North America foal crop of roughly 22,500. (Note: Horses from Europe and Japan are also eligible for the race, but proportionally fewer of them are pointed towards the Kentucky Derby.) The field is limited to twenty horses who qualify based on points earned in the 2019 Road to the Kentucky Derby, a series of designated races that was first introduced in 2013. This point system replaced the previous graded stakes race earnings system.

Most positions in the Derby starting gate are earned on the main Road, consisting of 34 races in North America plus one in Dubai. The seven major preps for the Kentucky Derby are the Louisiana Derby, UAE Derby, Florida Derby, Wood Memorial, Blue Grass Stakes, Santa Anita Derby and Arkansas Derby. Each of these races provided the winner with 100 qualifying points, essentially guaranteeing that horse a berth in the Derby provided the owner pays the required nomination and entry fees. The first three of these major preps were run in late March and were won by By My Standards, Plus Que Parfait and Maximum Security respectively. The next three major prep races were run on April 6, and were won by Tacitus, Vekoma and Roadster respectively. The last major prep was run on April 13, and was won by Omaha Beach.

One qualification position is also available via the European Road to the Kentucky Derby, and another via the Japan Road. In 2019, none of the offers for the European Road were accepted and the top three finishers in the Japan Road declined their invitation as they had not been nominated to the Derby. The connections of the fourth-place finisher on the Japan Road, Master Fencer, decided to accept the offer, marking the first time that a Japanese-bred horse entered the Derby via the Japan Road.

== Field ==
The cutoff to qualify for the Derby was 40 points, the highest such total since the points system was adopted. The post position draw took place on April 30, after which Omaha Beach was installed as the 4–1 morning line favorite. However, he was scratched from the race on May 1 due to an entrapped epiglottis, which impaired his breathing. Because of his withdrawal, Bodexpress drew into the field as program number 21. With the subsequent scratch of Haikal (originally post position 11) combined with Omaha Beach (originally post position 12), horses with higher program numbers moved over two place in the starting gate—for example, Code of Honor (saddle cloth 13) started from post position 11.

Trainer Bob Baffert, whose five Derby wins include Triple Crown champions American Pharoah and Justify, had three of the leading contenders: Champion Two-Year-Old Game Winner, Santa Anita Derby winner Roadster, and Arkansas Derby second-place finisher Improbable who would go on to be the 2020 Champion Older Dirt Male after three Grade One wins. "This year is different," said Baffert. "With [Justify and American Pharoah] I knew I had the horse and felt like I needed a little luck. Now I've got three nice horses, and there's a lot of parity. It's wide open."

== Race description ==
A crowd of 150,729 turned out for the Derby. The rain held off until late afternoon, but then drenched the track, turning the track condition sloppy.

Maximum Security went off as the second favorite (behind Improbable) at odds of 9–2 based on his frontrunning win in the Florida Derby. As expected, he went to the early lead, running a very fast opening quarter of 22.31 seconds. Jockey Luis Saez then slowed down the pace, as they completed the half-mile in 46.62 and six furlongs in 1:12.50. As they rounded the final turn, the field began to bunch up as other contenders mounted their closing drives. With about 5/16 of a mile remaining in the race, Maximum Security swerved out from the two path (i.e., two positions away from the rail) into the four or five path. In the process, he made contact with War of Will and also interfered with Long Range Toddy and Bodexpress, causing all three horses to check strides. Saez, who later said that Maximum Security swerved in reaction to noise from the large crowd, quickly corrected course and returned to the two path, bumping Code of Honor who had been gaining ground on the rail. Maximum Security fought back and again drew clear of the field, crossing the finish line first.

Meanwhile, Country House had broken from an outside post position and settled into mid-pack, carried three wide around the first turn. Going into the final turn, he was still in ninth place but rapidly made up ground while again moving wide. He was close to Maximum Security when that horse veered out, and was carried wide by Long Range Toddy. He could not respond to Maximum Security's rally, but held off the rest of the field to finish a clear second.

=== Objections ===
After the race, the jockeys of Country House and Long Range Toddy each filed an objection to the result. The rules of racing in Kentucky provide for the disqualification of a horse if it shifts its position in a manner that impedes another horse, costing the other horse a better placing in the race. Although Country House was not materially harmed by Maximum Security's swerve on the far turn, at least three other horses — War of Will, Long Range Toddy, and Bodexpress — were severely affected. During a 22-minute review, the stewards determined that "Maximum Security veered out into the path of #1 War of Will, who was forced to check and who, in turn, impeded #18 Long Range Toddy, who came out into #21 Bodexpress, who had to check sharply, making contact with #20 Country House." The stewards upheld the objections and disqualified Maximum Security to 17th place, after Long Range Toddy.

The disqualification is the first in Derby history to remove the first-place finishing horse for an on-track infraction; Dancer's Image was disqualified days after the 1968 Kentucky Derby for testing positive for an illegal medication.

The ruling proved controversial, with Maximum Security's owners blaming jockey Tyler Gaffalione on War of Will for causing the incident. War of Will's trainer, Mark Casse, responded that the interference by Maximum Security was worse than he originally thought and that he too would have filed an objection if War of Will had finished in the money. The stewards later issued a fifteen-day suspension on Maximum Security's jockey, Luis Saez, for "failure to control his mount and make the proper effort to maintain a straight course thereby causing interference with several rivals".

It was the first Kentucky Derby win for trainer Bill Mott, who commented that it was "bittersweet" to win the race in such a manner even though it was normally a routine matter to disqualify a horse for such an incident. NBC analysts Randy Moss and Jerry Bailey were quick to say they thought that Maximum Security was the best horse and that "the best horse won".

At odds of 65–1, Country House became the second-highest-priced winner (behind Donerail in 1913) in the 145-year history of the Derby.

== Results ==
Finish	Program Number (Note: Due to scratches, horses with higher program numbers moved closer to the rail)	Horse	Qualifying Points	Trainer	Jockey	Morning Line Odds	Final Odds	Margin (Lengths)	Winnings
1 (Note: Country House was promoted to first place as the result of Maximum Security's interference.)	20	Country House	50	William I. Mott	Flavien Prat	30–1	65.20	1 3/4 lengths	$1,860,000
2	13	Code of Honor	74	Claude R. McGaughey	John Velazquez	15–1	14.40	2 1/2 lengths	$660,000
3	8	Tacitus	150	William I. Mott	José Ortiz	10–1	5.80	3 1/4 lengths	$300,000
4	5	Improbable	65	Bob Baffert	Irad Ortiz Jr.	6–1	4.00	3 1/4 lengths	$150,000
5	16	Game Winner	85	Bob Baffert	Joel Rosario	5–1	6.80	3 3/4 lengths	$90,000
6	15	Master Fencer	Japan Road	Koichi Tsunoda	Julien Leparoux	50–1	58.60	4 lengths	
7	1	War of Will	60	Mark Casse	Tyler Gaffalione	20–1	16.70	4 1/2 lengths	
8	9	Plus Que Parfait	104	Brendan Walsh	Ricardo Santana Jr.	30–1	57.10	5 1/4 lengths	
9	14	Win Win Win	50	Michael J. Trombetta	Julian Pimentel	15–1	16.80	8 1/2 lengths	
10	10	Cutting Humor	50	Todd Pletcher	Mike E. Smith (Note: Originally Corey Lanerie was to ride Cutting Humor but after the scratching of Omaha Beach connections of Cutting Humor replaced Lanarie with Mike Smith but would pay both jockeys the customary 10% of any purses earned by the entry in the event.)	30–1	24.10	9 1/4 lengths	
11	3	By My Standards	100	Bret Calhoun	Gabriel Saez	20–1	18.80	11 1/4 lengths	
12	6	Vekoma	110	George Weaver	Javier Castellano	20–1	16.80	14 3/4 lengths	
13	21	Bodexpress (Note: Bodexpress was originally "also eligible" and drew into the field when Omaha Beach was scratched.)	40	Gustavo Delgado	Chris Landeros	30–1	71.00	15 lengths	
14	2	Tax	52	Danny Gargan	Junior Alvarado	20–1	35.50	15 lengths	
15	17	Roadster	100	Bob Baffert	Florent Geroux	6–1	11.60	16 1/2 lengths	
16	18	Long Range Toddy	53.5	Steve Asmussen	Jon Court	30–1	54.80	18 lengths	
17-DQ (Note: Maximum Security finished first but was disqualified to 17th place for interference.)	7	Maximum Security	100	Jason Servis	Luis Saez	10–1	4.50		
18	19	Spinoff	40	Todd Pletcher	Manuel Franco	30–1	52.30	18 lengths	
19	4	Gray Magician	41	Peter Miller	Drayden Van Dyke	50–1	33.80	26 1/4 lengths	
~~n/a~~	~~11~~	~~Haikal~~	~~70~~	~~Kiaran McLaughlin~~	~~Rajiv Maragh~~	~~30–1~~	Scratched (Note: Haikal was scratched after he was diagnosed with a foot abscess.)	~~n/a~~	
~~n/a~~	~~12~~	~~Omaha Beach~~	~~137.5~~	~~Richard E. Mandella~~	~~Mike E. Smith~~	~~4–1~~	Scratched (Note: Omaha Beach was scratched after he was diagnosed with entrapped epiglottis.)	~~n/a~~	

Note: The margins listed above are based on Maximum Security's first-place finish before disqualification.

Track condition: sloppy

Times: 1/4 mile – 22.31; 1/2 mile – 46.42; 3/4 mile – 1:12.50; mile – 1:38.63; final – 2:03.93.
Splits for each quarter-mile: (22.31) (24.31) (25.88) (26.13) (25.30)

Source: Equibase chart

=== Payouts ===
The table below gives Kentucky Derby payout schedule

Program number	Horse name	Win	Place	Show
20	Country House	$132.40	$56.60	$24.60
13	Code of Honor	—	$15.20	$9.80
8	Tacitus	—	—	$5.60

- $2 exacta: $3,009.60
- $0.50 trifecta: $5,737.65
- $1 superfecta: $51,400.10
- $1 Super High Five: $544,185.90

=== Wagering ===
Wagering on the Kentucky Oaks day totaled US$60.2 million, including US$19.4 million on the Kentucky Oaks race. Wagering on the Kentucky Derby day totaled US$250.9 million, including US$165.5 million on the Kentucky Derby race. Wagering across the Kentucky Derby Festival totaled US$343.0 million.

== Subsequent Grade I wins ==
Several horses from the 2019 Derby went on to win Grade I races later in their career, including Maximum Security, who was named the champion three-year-old colt. However, Country House never raced again due to a career-ending bout of laminitis.

- Code of Honor – Travers Stakes, Jockey Club Gold Cup
- War of Will – Preakness Stakes
- Improbable – 2020 Hollywood Gold Cup, Whitney, Awesome Again Stakes
- Vekoma – 2020 Carter Handicap, Metropolitan Handicap
- Maximum Security – Haskell Invitational, Cigar Mile Handicap (Note: Maximum Security also crossed the line first in the 2020 Saudi Cup, but was disqualified following an investigation into trainer Jason Servis by the Jockey Club of Saudi Arabia that concluded in August 2024.)
- Omaha Beach (scratched from Derby) – Santa Anita Sprint Championship, Malibu Stakes
