= Risen Star Stakes =

- Class: Grade II
- Location: Fair Grounds Race Course; New Orleans, Louisiana
- Inaugurated: 1973 (as Louisiana Derby Trial)
- Race type: Thoroughbred - Flat racing
- Sponsor: Fasig-Tipton (2025)
- Website: Fair Grounds

Race information
- Distance: 1 1/8 miles (9 furlongs)
- Surface: Dirt
- Track: left-handed
- Qualification: Three-year-olds
- Weight: 122 lbs
- Purse: $500,000 (since 2025)
- Bonuses: Qualification points – Road to the Kentucky Derby

The Risen Star Stakes is a Grade II American Thoroughbred horse race for three-year-old horses at a distance of one and one-eighth miles on the dirt run annually in February, usually during the President's Day weekend at Fair Grounds Race Course in New Orleans, Louisiana. The event currently offers a purse of $500,000.

== History ==
The event was inaugurated 16 March 1973 as the Louisiana Derby Trial with handicap conditions over a distance of one mile and forty yards with the Indiana bred colt Navajo victorious by one length over Smooth Dancer with Assagai Jr. in third place. The time run by the winner was 1:40 flat. Navajo received free entry into the Louisiana Derby and finished second to Leo's Pisces. Later that year Navajo ran in the Kentucky Derby and finished seventh to Secretariat.

The event as a trial race immediately became a major prep for the Louisiana Derby.

In 1975 the event was increased to 1 1/16 miles and was won by Master Derby. Master Derby followed up winning the Louisiana Derby. Later in his Triple Crown campaign, Master Derby was victorious in the Preakness.

The event was shortened back to its inaugural distance in 1988 of 1 mile and 40 yards. The event that year was won by Risen Star who went on to win the Preakness and Belmont Stakes and be voted the 1988 Eclipse Award for American Champion Three-Year-Old Male Horse. The following year the track renamed the event in honor of Risen Star to the Risen Star Stakes.

In 1991 the distance of the event was increased to 1 1/16 miles and in 2002 the American Graded Stakes Committee upgraded the race to Grade III. The event was upgraded once more in 2010 to Grade II.

The Risen Star Stakes was run in two divisions in 1989, 1993, 1995 and 2020.

No winner of the Risen Star Stakes has gone on to win the Kentucky Derby. However, two runners who have run in the event have gone on to win the Run for the Roses. War Emblem finished sixth at Fair Grounds before winning at Churchill Downs in 2002. Country House was second in the Risen Star before crossing second in the 2019 Kentucky Derby, only to be promoted after first-place finisher Maximum Security was disqualified by Kentucky stewards for interference. The Risen Star also has produced two winners of the second leg of the American Triple Crown: Master Derby (1975) and War of Will (2019). It has also produced two winners of the Breeders' Cup Classic: Gun Runner and Mucho Macho Man.

The event is part of the Road to the Kentucky Derby.

== Records ==
Speed record:

- 1 1/8 miles – 1:48.85 Magnitude (2025)
- 1 1/16 miles – 1:42.80 Zarbs Magic (1996)
- 1 mile and 40 yards – 1:39.80 Heavy Mayonnaise (1974)

Margins:

- 10 lengths – Badge of Silver (2003)

Most wins by a jockey:

- 3 - Shane P. Romero (1988, 1989, 1992)
- 3 - Robby Albarado (2003, 2004, 2007)
- 3 - Florent Geroux (2016, 2020, 2021)
- 3 - Tyler Gaffalione (2019, 2024, 2026)

Most wins by a trainer:

- 4 - Steve Asmussen (2008, 2016, 2022, 2025)

Most wins by an owner:

- 4 - Winchell Thoroughbreds (2008, 2016, 2022, 2025)

Risen Star Stakes – Louisiana Derby double:

- Master Derby †(1975), Taylor's Special †(1984), Risen Star †(1988), Dispersal (1989), Line in the Sand (1992), Dixieland Heat (1993), Comic Strip (1998), Pyro (2008), Friesan Fire (2009), International Star (2015), Gun Runner (2016), Girvin (2017), Epicenter (2022)

Notes:
† Risen Star Stakes was known as the Louisiana Derby Trial.

== Winners ==
Year	Winner	Jockey	Trainer	Owner	Distance	Time	Purse	Grade	Ref
At Fair Grounds – Risen Star Stakes
2026	Paladin	Tyler Gaffalione	Chad C. Brown	Derrick Smith, Mrs. John Magnier, Michael Tabor, Peter Brant, Brook T. Smith & Summer Wind Equine	1 1/8 miles	1:49.14	$495,000	II	
2025	Magnitude	Ben Curtis	Steven M. Asmussen	Winchell Thoroughbreds	1 1/8 miles	1:48.85	$500,000	II	
2024	Sierra Leone	Tyler Gaffalione	Chad C. Brown	Derrick Smith, Mrs. John Magnier, Michael Tabor, Westerburg, Brook T. Smith & Peter Brant	1 1/8 miles	1:52.13	$400,000	II	
2023	Angel of Empire	Luis Saez	Brad H. Cox	Albaugh Family Stables	1 1/8 miles	1:51.47	$400,000	II	
2022	Epicenter	Joel Rosario	Steven M. Asmussen	Winchell Thoroughbreds	1 1/8 miles	1:49.03	$400,000	II	
2021	Mandaloun	Florent Geroux	Brad H. Cox	Juddmonte Farms	1 1/8 miles	1:50.39	$400,000	II	
2020	Mr. Monomoy	Florent Geroux	Brad H. Cox	Madaket Stables, Michael Dubb & Doheny Racing	1 1/8 miles	1:50.43	$400,000	II	Division 1
2020	Modernist	Junior Alvarado	William I. Mott	Pam & Martin Wygod	1 1/8 miles	1:51.28	$400,000	II	Division 2
2019	War of Will	Tyler Gaffalione	Mark E. Casse	Gary Barber	1 1/16 miles	1:44.59	$400,000	II	
2018	Bravazo	Miguel Mena	D. Wayne Lukas	Calumet Farm	1 1/16 miles	1:42.95	$400,000	II	
2017	Girvin	Brian Hernandez Jr.	Joe Sharp	Brad Grady	1 1/16 miles	1:43.08	$400,000	II	
2016	Gun Runner	Florent Geroux	Steven M. Asmussen	Winchell Thoroughbreds & Three Chimneys Farm	1 1/16 miles	1:43.94	$400,000	II	
2015	International Star	Miguel Mena	Michael J. Maker	Kenneth & Sarah Ramsey	1 1/16 miles	1:43.82	$400,000	II	
2014	Intense Holiday	Mike E. Smith	Todd A. Pletcher	Starlight Racing	1 1/16 miles	1:43.86	$400,000	II	
2013	Ive Struck a Nerve	James Graham	J. Keith Desormeaux	Big Chief Racing	1 1/16 miles	1:44.52	$400,000	II	
2012	El Padrino	Javier Castellano	Todd A. Pletcher	Let's Go Stable	1 1/16 miles	1:42.96	$300,000	II	
2011	Mucho Macho Man	Rajiv Maragh	Katherine Ritvo	Reeves Thoroughbred Racing & Dream Team One Racing Stable	1 1/16 miles	1:43.98	$300,000	II	
2010	Discreetly Mine	Javier Castellano	Todd A. Pletcher	E. Paul Robsham Stables	1 1/16 miles	1:44.88	$300,000	II	
2009	Friesan Fire	Gabriel Saez	J. Larry Jones	Fox Hill Farms & Vinery Stables	1 1/16 miles	1:45.11	$200,000	III	
2008	Pyro	Shaun Bridgmohan	Steven M. Asmussen	Winchell Thoroughbreds	1 1/16 miles	1:44.68	$300,000	III	
2007	Notional	Robby Albarado	Doug F. O'Neill	J. Paul Reddam	1 1/16 miles	1:44.18	$300,000	III	
At Louisiana Downs
2006	Lawyer Ron	John McKee	Robert E. Holthus	James T. Hines Jr.	1 1/16 miles	1:43.13	$268,000	III	
At Fair Grounds
2005	Scipion	Gary L. Stevens	Patrick L. Biancone	Virginia Kraft Payson	1 1/16 miles	1:44.54	$150,000	III	
2004	Gradepoint	Robby Albarado	Neil J. Howard	Mt. Brilliant Stable & William S. Farish III	1 1/16 miles	1:45.36	$150,000	III	
2003	Badge of Silver	Robby Albarado	Ronny W. Werner	Kenneth & Sarah Ramsey	1 1/16 miles	1:42.99	$150,000	III	
2002	Repent	Anthony J. D'Amico	Kenneth G. McPeek	Select Stable	1 1/16 miles	1:43.86	$150,000	III	
2001	Dollar Bill	Chris McCarron	Dallas Stewart	Gary & Mary West Stables	1 1/16 miles	1:43.45	$125,000	Listed	
2000	Exchange Rate	Corey Nakatani	D. Wayne Lukas	Padua Stables & Anne Sanan	1 1/16 miles	1:44.25	$125,000	Listed	
1999	Ecton Park	Shane Sellers	W. Elliott Walden	Mark H. Stanley	1 1/16 miles	1:44.83	$125,000	Listed	
1998	Comic Strip	Shane Sellers	Neil J. Howard	James Elkins, William S. Farish III & G. Watts Humphrey Jr.	1 1/16 miles	1:44.20	$125,000	Listed	
1997	Open Forum	Donna M. Barton	D. Wayne Lukas	Robert & Beverly Lewis	1 1/16 miles	1:44.20	$100,000	Listed	
1996	Zarb's Magic	Elvis Joseph Perrodin	W. Bret Thomas	Foxwood Plantation	1 1/16 miles	1:42.80	$63,250	Listed	
1995	Knockadoon	Willie Martinez	Anthony L. Reinstedler	William K. Warren Jr.	1 1/16 miles	1:45.22	$53,137	Listed	Division 1
1995	Beavers Nose	Kenneth Bourque	Eldridge Hebert Jr.	R. W. Raymond & D. O. Philips	1 1/16 miles	1:45.44	$52,987	Listed	Division 2
1994	Fly Cry	Ronald D. Ardoin	Thomas M. Amoss	Al Prats & Bryan Wagner	1 1/16 miles	1:43.02	$51,923	Listed	
1993	Dixieland Heat	Randy Romero	Gerald J. Romero	Leland Cook	1 1/16 miles	1:43.20	$26,800	Listed	Division 1
1993	Dry Bean	Aaron Gryder	Thomas K. Bohannan	Loblolly Stable	1 1/16 miles	1:43.80	$26,800	Listed	Division 2
1992	Line in the Sand	Shane P. Romero	Neil J. Howard	William S. Farish III	1 1/16 miles	1:45.00	$32,725		
1991	Big Courage	Tammy Lee Fox	William I. Fox Sr.	Mrs. Patsy Fox	1 1/16 miles	1:46.70	$32,050		
1990	Genuine Meaning	John Hirdes	Ronnie G. Tenhundfeld	Robert Asaro	1 mile & 40 yards	1:40.80	$27,900		
1989	Nooo Problema	Shane P. Romero	Donald R. Winfree	Mr. & Mrs. John H. Reed	1 mile & 40 yards	1:42.20	$20,000		Division 1
1989	Dispersal	Bobby J. Walker Jr.	Bud Delp	Harry & Tom Meyerhoff	1 mile & 40 yards	1:42.80	$20,000		Division 2
Louisiana Derby Trial Stakes
1988	Risen Star	Shane P. Romero	Louie J. Roussel III	Louie J. Roussel III	1 mile & 40 yards	1:40.00	$20,000		
1987	Authentic Hero	Larry Melancon	Donald R. Winfree	James J. Devaney	1 1/16 miles	1:48.00	$25,000		
1986	Dr. Bee Jay	Ricky Frazier	Tommie T. Morgan	Jimmy Clary & Tommie T. Morgan	1 1/16 miles	1:45.40	$30,000		
1985	Mischiefinmind	Ronald Ardoin	Gerald J. Romero	Gerald J. Romero	1 1/16 miles	1:45.80	$25,000		
1984	Taylor's Special	Randy Romero	William I. Mott	William F. Lucas	1 1/16 miles	1:43.00	$25,000		
1983	Explosive Wagon	Charlie Mueller	Gene C. Norman	Mrs. Peggy McReynolds	1 1/16 miles	1:43.80	$25,000		
1982	Linkage	Greg Smith	Henry S. Clark	Mrs. Harry W. Lunger	1 1/16 miles	1:44.40	$25,000		
1981	Senate Chairman	Earlie Fires	Ronald G. Warren	Russell Micheal Jr.	1 1/16 miles	1:45.00	$25,000		
1980	Withholding	Bryan Fann	Ronald G. Warren	Russell Micheal Jr.	1 1/16 miles	1:46.80	$25,000		
1979	Incredible Ease	James D. Nichols	Billy S. Borders	Izzie Proler & Joseph R. Straus Jr.	1 1/16 miles	1:45.80	$25,000		
1978	Batonnier	Wayne M. Catalano	Harry E. Trotsek	Edward A. Seltzer	1 1/16 miles	1:44.20	$25,000		
1977	Run Dusty Run	Darrel McHargue	William E. Adams	Golden Chance Farm	1 1/16 miles	1:44.60	$25,000		
1976	Go East Young Man	Eddie Delahoussaye	Dewey P. Smith	Dorothy Dorsett Brown	1 1/16 miles	1:45.00	$25,000		
1975	§ Master Derby	Darrel McHargue	William E. Adams	Golden Chance Farm	1 1/16 miles	1:44.40	$25,000		
1974	Heavy Mayonnaise	Craig Perret	Don Kempfer	Albert H. Stall & William E. Trotter	1 mile & 40 yards	1:39.80	$25,000		
1973	Navajo	Weston Soirez	James O. Keefer	Joe Stevenson & Ray Stump	1 mile & 40 yards	1:40.00	$20,000		

Notes:
§ Ran as an entry

== See also ==
- List of American and Canadian Graded races
