= Gary Barber =

South African and American film producer

- Born: 1957 (age 68–69); Johannesburg, South Africa
- Citizenship: South Africa; United States
- Education: B.S. University of the Witwatersrand
- Occupation: Media executive
- Known for: CEO of Metro-Goldwyn-Mayer (2010–2018); Co-founder of Spyglass Media Group
- Children: 3

Gary Barber (born 1957) is a South African and American film producer. Barber was the chairman and CEO of Metro-Goldwyn-Mayer. He is also co-founder of Spyglass Media Group.

== Biography ==
Barber was born to a Jewish family in Johannesburg, South Africa. He was educated at King David School, Linksfield, in Johannesburg. He then received an accounting degree from the University of the Witwatersrand, also in Johannesburg. He later worked as a Chartered Accountant and Certified Public Accountant in South Africa and the United States, both with Price Waterhouse.

In 1982, he won a trip to the Arlington Million horse race in Illinois. In the same year, he moved to the United States, where his brother Cecil had been living since 1979. In the mid-1980s, Barber became a U.S. citizen. In 1998, he and Roger Birnbaum founded Spyglass Entertainment in Los Angeles. His highest-grossing film as producer was The Tourist (2010), which grossed close to US$280 million at the worldwide box office.

In December 2010, Barber became chief executive officer of Metro-Goldwyn-Mayer (MGM). Under his leadership, MGM together with Eon Productions and Sony Pictures financed the successful James Bond film Skyfall, which grossed US$1,1 billion. MGM then also financed The Hobbit: An Unexpected Journey (2012), 21 Jump Street (2012) and Hansel & Gretel: Witch Hunters (2013). MGM then moved forward with remakes of RoboCop and Poltergeist. In March 2018, Barber was ousted from MGM, coming five months after the renewal of his contract with the studio to 2022; he received a $260M settlement.

Barber has three daughters and lives in Los Angeles.

=== Horse racing ===
Barber is also a Thoroughbred racehorse owner. The Deputy, owned in partnership with Team Valor, won the 2000 running of the Grade II Santa Catalina Stakes and the Grade I Santa Anita Derby at Santa Anita Park in Arcadia, California. In 2006, Becrux, also owned in partnership with Team Valor, won the Grade I Woodbine Mile at Woodbine Racetrack in Toronto, Canada. In 2014, his filly Lexie Lou won the Queen's Plate and was named the Canadian Horse of the Year. His horse War of Will won the 2019 Preakness Stakes.

== Filmography ==
Executive Producer

- Midnight Crossing (1988)
- Communion (1989)
- Howling V: The Rebirth (1990)
- Young Guns II (1990)
- Pacific Heights (1990)
- Robin Hood: Prince of Thieves (1991)
- Freejack (1992)
- White Sands (1992)
- Stay Tuned (1992)
- The Crush (1993)
- True Romance (1993)
- Ace Ventura: Pet Detective (1994)
- Major League II (1994)
- Chasers (1994)
- Trial by Jury (1994)
- Imaginary Crimes (1994)
- Silent Fall (1994)
- Ace Ventura: When Nature Calls (1995)
- Two If by Sea (1996)
- Big Bully (1996)
- Diabolique (1996)
- Bad Moon (1996)
- Wild America (1997)
- Incognito (1998)
- Major League: Back to the Minors (1998)
- Wrongfully Accused (1998)
- The King and I (1999)
- Keeping the Faith (2000)
- Shanghai Noon (2000)
- Unbreakable (2000)
- Out Cold (2001)
- Criminology 101 (2003)
- Bruce Almighty (2003)
- Seabiscuit (2003)
- One Love (2003)
- The Ranch (2004)
- Weekends (2004)
- The Legend of Zorro (2005)
- Memoirs of a Geisha (2005)
- Eight Below (2006)
- Stay Alive (2006)
- Stick It (2006)
- Welcome Home Roscoe Jenkins (2008)
- The Ruins (2008)
- The Happening (2008)
- The Love Guru (2008)
- Wanted (2008)
- Ghost Town (2008)
- G.I. Joe: The Rise of Cobra (2009)
- Invictus (2009)
- Dinner for Schmucks (2010)
- No Strings Attached (2011)
- Footloose (2011)
- G.I. Joe: Retaliation (2013)
- Glass (2019)
- Scream (2022)
- Hellraiser (2022)
- Scream VI (2023)
- The Boys in the Boat (2023)
- Spy Kids: Armageddon (2023)

Producer

- The Count of Monte Cristo (2002)
- Dragonfly (2002)
- Reign of Fire (2002)
- Abandon (2002)
- The Recruit (2003)
- Shanghai Knights (2003)
- Connie and Carla (2004)
- Mr. 3000 (2004)
- The Pacifier (2005)
- The Hitchhiker's Guide to the Galaxy (2005)
- The Lookout (2007)
- The Invisible (2007)
- Evan Almighty (2007)
- Underdog (2007)
- Balls of Fury (2007)
- 27 Dresses (2008)
- Flash of Genius (2008)
- Four Christmases (2008)
- Leap Year (2010)
- The Tourist (2010)
- The Vow (2012)
- RoboCop (2014) (Uncredited)

Special thanks

- The Unholy (1988)
