= 2021 Belmont Stakes =

American horse race

153rd Belmont Stakes
- Belmont Stakes
- Grade I stakes race
- "The Test of the Champion"
- Location: Belmont Park; Elmont, New York, United States
- Date: June 5, 2021
- Distance: 1 1/2 mi (12 furlongs; 2,414 m)
- Winning horse: Essential Quality
- Winning time: 2:27.11
- Final odds: 1.30 (to 1)
- Jockey: Luis Saez
- Trainer: Brad H. Cox
- Owner: Godolphin Stables
- Conditions: Fast
- Surface: Dirt

The 2021 Belmont Stakes was the 153rd running of the Belmont Stakes and the 110th time the event took place at Belmont Park. The 1 1/2-mile (2,400 m) race, known as the "test of the champion", is the final leg in the American Triple Crown, open to three-year-old Thoroughbreds. The race was won by Essential Quality.

The race took place on June 5, 2021, in Elmont, New York, with an actual start time of 6:50 p.m. EDT; television coverage was by NBC. It was a Grade I stakes race with a purse of $1.5 million. Entering the race, it was known that there would be no Triple Crown winner, as the Kentucky Derby and Preakness Stakes had already been won by different horses.

== Background ==
Due to effects from the COVID-19 pandemic, the 2020 edition was contested as the first leg of the Triple Crown, on June 20 without spectators. The 2021 Triple Crown races returned to their traditional sequence and schedule, with Medina Spirit winning the 2021 Kentucky Derby on May 1, and Rombauer winning the 2021 Preakness Stakes on May 15. A week after the Derby, it was announced that Medina Spirit had tested positive for betamethasone, a corticosteroid, and stood to be disqualified if the split sample confirmed the positive; with that result still pending, Medina Spirit submitted to additional testing and was allowed to run in the Preakness.

Attendance for the Belmont was set at a maximum of 11,000 spectators, with attendees required to provide proof of their COVID-19 vaccination or a negative COVID-19 test.

== Field ==
Several horses that ran in the Derby and then bypassed the Preakness were possible entrants in the Belmont: Mandaloun, Hot Rod Charlie, Essential Quality, and O Besos.

On May 17, the New York Racing Association (NYRA) banned trainer Bob Baffert from entering any horses in races in the state of New York. The ban had not been lifted by June 5 and so prevented Medina Spirit or Concert Tour from running in the Belmont. The same day, Preakness winner Rombauer and seventh-place finisher France Go de Ina arrived at Belmont Park. On May 18, owners of Kentucky Oaks winner Malathaat stated that the filly would not be entered in the Belmont.

With a maximum field size of 16 horses, the post-position draw was held on June 1. Essential Quality, the fourth-place finisher in the Kentucky Derby, was installed as the 2–1 morning line favorite.

== Results ==
Finish	Program number	Horse	Trainer	Jockey	Morning line odds	Final odds	Margin	Winnings
1	2	Essential Quality	Brad Cox	Luis Saez	2–1	1.30	—	$800,000
2	4	Hot Rod Charlie	Doug O'Neill	Flavien Prat	7–2	4.80	1 1/4	$280,000
3	3	Rombauer	Michael W. McCarthy	John R. Velazquez	3–1	5.70	12 1/2	$150,000
4	6	Known Agenda	Todd Pletcher	Jose L. Ortiz‡	6–1	6.60	13 1/4	$100,000
5	1	Bourbonic	Todd Pletcher	Kendrick Carmouche	15–1	14.70	15 1/2	$60,000
6	7	Rock Your World	John Sadler	Joel Rosario	9–2	5.00	22	$45,000
7	8	Overtook	Todd Pletcher	Manuel Franco	20–1	19.00	25 1/4	$35,000
8	5	France Go de Ina	Hideyuki Mori	Ricardo Santana Jr.	30–1	27.25	eased	$30,000

‡ Known Agenda was planned to be ridden by Irad Ortiz Jr., but the jockey suffered an injury two days before the race.

Track condition: Fast

Times: 1/4 mile – 22.78; 1/2 mile – 46.49; 3/4 mile – 1:12.07; mile – 1:37.40; 1 1/4 miles – 2:02.38; final – 2:27.11
Splits for each quarter-mile: (23.71) (25.58) (25.33) (24.98) (24.73)

=== Payouts ===
Based on a $2 bet:

Program number	Horse name	Win	Place	Show
2	Essential Quality	$4.60	$3.00	$2.60
4	Hot Rod Charlie	–	$4.10	$2.90
3	Rombauer	–	–	$3.50

- $1 Exacta: (2–4) $7.50
- $1 Trifecta: (2–4–3) $21.70
- $1 Superfecta: (2–4–3–6) $60.70
