= 2021 Preakness Stakes =

146th running Preakness Stakes

146th Preakness Stakes
- Preakness Stakes
- Grade I stakes race
- "The Middle Jewel of the Triple Crown" "The Run for the Black-Eyed Susans"
- Location: Pimlico Race Course; Baltimore, Maryland, U.S.
- Date: May 15, 2021
- Distance: 1 3/16 mi (9.5 furlongs; 1,900 m)
- Winning horse: Rombauer
- Winning time: 1:53.62
- Final odds: 11.80
- Jockey: Flavien Prat
- Trainer: Michael W. McCarthy
- Owner: John & Diane Fradkin
- Conditions: Fast
- Surface: Dirt
- Attendance: 10,000

The 2021 Preakness Stakes was the 146th Preakness Stakes, a Grade I stakes race for three-year-old Thoroughbreds at a distance of 1 3/16 miles (1.9 km). The race is one leg of the American Triple Crown and is held annually at Pimlico Race Course in Baltimore, Maryland. The Preakness Stakes is traditionally held on the third Saturday in May, two weeks after the Kentucky Derby. The 2021 Preakness took place on May 15 with an actual start time of 6:54 p.m. EDT, with television coverage by NBC. The race was won by Rombauer.

== Background ==
Due to effects from the COVID-19 pandemic, the 2020 edition was run outside of its normal May schedule, contested as the final leg of the Triple Crown on October 3, without spectators. In late March 2021, organizers announced that attendance at the 2021 Preakness would be limited to 10,000. The 2021 Triple Crown races returned to their traditional sequence and schedule, with Medina Spirit winning the 2021 Kentucky Derby on May 1.

== Field ==
Soon after the Derby, trainer Bob Baffert confirmed that Medina Spirit would be entered in the Preakness. However, it was later announced that Medina Spirit had tested positive for betamethasone, a corticosteroid, following the Derby, and stands to be disqualified if the split sample confirms the positive. Pimlico agreed to accept the entry of Medina Spirit on the condition that he undergo blood testing, monitoring, and a review of medical records prior to the Preakness; conditions that Medina Spirit met successfully.

In the first week of May, trainer Brad Cox stated that Mandaloun, who had finished second in the Derby and stood to be declared the winner upon a disqualification of Medina Spirit, would bypass the Preakness. Essential Quality, who had been the favorite in the Derby before finishing fourth, was also ruled out of the Preakness. In their absence, the main rival to Medina Spirit was expected to be his stablemate, Concert Tour, who had won two stakes races but finished third in his most recent start in the Arkansas Derby. Midnight Bourbon was expected to be the third betting choice based on his sixth-place finish in the Derby, second-place finish in the Louisiana Derby and win in the Lecomte Stakes.

The post-position draw was held on May 11. At the time the race was run, the top betting favorites were Medina Spirit, Midnight Bourbon, and Concert Tour in that order.

At post time, Midnight Bourbon and Medina Spirit went off as co-betting favorites each at 5-2.

== Result ==
Finish	Program Number	Horse	Trainer	Jockey	Morning Line Odds	Final Odds	Margin (Lengths)	Winnings
1	6	Rombauer	Michael W. McCarthy	Flavien Prat	12–1	11.80	—	$1,000,000
2	5	Midnight Bourbon	Steve Asmussen	Irad Ortiz Jr.	5–1	3.10	3.6	$600,000
3	3	Medina Spirit	Bob Baffert	John Velazquez	9–5	2.40	5.6	$200,000
4	2	Keepmeinmind	Robertino Diodoro	David Cohen	15–1	14.50	9.7	$110,000
5	4	Crowded Trade	Chad Brown	Javier Castellano	10–1	8.50	12.4	$60,000
6	8	Unbridled Honor	Todd Pletcher	Luis Saez	15–1	13.70	17.2	$30,000
7	7	France Go de Ina	Hideyuki Mori	Joel Rosario	20–1	24.60	17.6	
8	9	Risk Taking	Chad Brown	Jose Ortiz	15–1	14.30	23.5	
9	10	Concert Tour	Bob Baffert	Mike Smith	5–2	3.70	34.2	
10	1	Ram	D. Wayne Lukas	Ricardo Santana Jr.	30–1	15.90	36.8	

Track condition: Fast

Times: 1/4 mile – 0:23.77; 1/2 mile – 0:46.93; 3/4 mile – 1:10.97; mile – 1:34.78; final – 1:53.62.
Splits for each quarter-mile: (:23.77) (:23.16) (:24.04) (:23.81) (:18.84 for final 3/16)

== Payout ==
Pgm	Horse	Win	Place	Show
6	Rombauer	$25.60	$10.00	$5.20
5	Midnight Bourbon	–	$4.60	$3.00
3	Medina Spirit	–	–	$2.80

- $1 Exacta (6–5) $49.30
- $1 Trifecta (6–5–3) $162.70
- $1 Superfecta (6–5–3–2) $1,025.50
- $1 Super High Five (6–5–3–2–4) $4,857.80
