= 2021 Road to the Kentucky Derby =

May 1 series of races through which horses qualified for the Kentucky Derby in 2021

The 2021 Road to the Kentucky Derby was a series of races through which horses qualified for the 2021 Kentucky Derby, which was held on May 1. The field for the Derby is limited to 20 horses, with up to four 'also eligibles' in case of a late withdrawal from the field. There were three separate paths for horses to take to qualify for the Derby: the main Road consisting of races in North America (plus one in Dubai), the Japan Road consisting of four races in Japan, and seven European races in England, Ireland and France. The top four finishers in the specified races received points, with higher points awarded in the major prep races in March and April. Earnings in non-restricted stakes races acted as a tie breaker.

The 2020 Road to the Kentucky Derby suffered major disruptions due to the COVID-19 pandemic, which led to the postponement of the 2020 Derby itself to September. For 2021, the main Road to the Kentucky Derby will instead resemble the 2019 Road to the Kentucky Derby, consisting of 36 races, 20 races for the Kentucky Derby Prep Season and 16 races for the Kentucky Derby Championship Season except for the following changes: (Note: See the following list for details)

- The John Battaglia Memorial Stakes, which was added to the Road in 2020, was retained as part of the Prep season for 2021
- The Jeff Ruby Steaks, which in 2019 and 2020 was a "Wild Card" event, was moved to the Championship Second leg of series with an increase of qualification points – with 1st 100 points, 2nd 40 points, 3rd 20 points and 4th 10 points

For the 2021 Road to the Kentucky Derby, horses which ran in qualifying events with the medication furosemide (Lasix) did not receive any qualification points.

== Standings ==
The following table shows the points earned in the eligible races for the main series and the leaderboard rank as of April 25. The Kentucky Derby was won by Mandaloun, who qualified in a Sixth place finished in the Louisiana Derby. He was new winner of the race after the original winner Medina Spirit was disqualified after testing positive for Betamethasone. The trainer of Medina Spirit Bob Baffert got suspended by Churchill Downs for two years.

Rank	Horse	Points	Earnings (Note: Earnings from non-restricted stakes prior to the running of the Kentucky Derby serve as a tie-breaker.)	Trainer	Owner	Ref
1	Essential Quality	140	$2,210,000	Brad H. Cox	Godolphin Stables	
2	Hot Rod Charlie (Note: Hot Rod Charlie was trained by Leandro Moro for the Louisiana Derby while O'Neill served a 10-day suspension)	110	$962,000	Doug F. O'Neill	Roadrunner Racing, Boat Racing & Strauss Bros Racing	
3	Super Stock	109	$709,000	Steve Asmussen	Erv Woolsey & Keith Asmussen	
4	Like the King	104	$161,300	Wesley A. Ward	M Racing Group	
5	Known Agenda	102	$461,000	Todd Pletcher	St. Elias Stable	
bypassing	Rebel's Romance (IRE) (Note: Rebel's Romance is ahead of Rock Your World in the standings due to higher stakes earned from non-restricted stakes, the second tie-breaker)	100	$510,000	Charlie Appleby	Godolphin Stables	
6	Rock Your World	100	$510,000	John W. Sadler	Hronis Racing & Talla Racing	
7	Bourbonic	100	$400,000	Todd Pletcher	Calumet Farm	
bypassing	Greatest Honour	80	$366,240	Claude R. McGaughey III	Courtlandt Farms	
8	Medina Spirit	74	$290,000	Bob Baffert	Zedan Racing Stables	
bypassing	Concert Tour	70	$820,000	Bob Baffert	Gary & Mary West	
9	Midnight Bourbon	66	$430,000	Steven M. Asmussen	Winchell Thoroughbreds	
injured	Life Is Good	60	$240,000	Bob Baffert	China Horse Club & WinStar Farm	
bypassing	Weyburn (Note: Weyburn's connections paid late nomination fees)	60	$215,000	James Jerkens	Chiefswood Stables	
**10**	**Mandaloun***	**52**	**$270,000**	**Brad H. Cox**	**Juddmonte Farms**	
bypassing (Note: Shortleaf Stable removed Caddo River after an elevated temperature on April 25)	Caddo River	50	$320,000	Brad H. Cox	Shortleaf Stable	
11 (Note: Trainer Chad Brown has indicated he is likely to have only one starter in the Derby, with a preference for starting Highly Motivated in the Derby and Crowded Trade in the Preakness)	Highly Motivated	50	$271,000	Chad C. Brown	Klaravich Stables	
12	Helium (Note: Helium's connections paid late nomination fees)	50	$255,492	Mark E. Casse	D. J. Stable	
bypassing (Note: Trainer Salem Bin Ghadayer had originally planned to enter but decided to withdraw after their travel plans from Dubai fell through.)	Panadol (Note: Panadol's connections paid late nomination fees)	40	$240,000	Salem bin Ghadayer	Sheikh Hamdan bin Mohammed Al Maktoum	
13	Soup and Sandwich	40	$161,000	Mark E. Casse	Live Oak Plantation	
14	Dynamic One	40	$140,000	Todd Pletcher	Repole Stable, Phipps Stable & St. Elias Stable	
bypassing	Crowded Trade	40	$135,000	Chad C. Brown	Klaravich Stables	
15	Sainthood	40	$47,000	Todd Pletcher	China Horse Club & WinStar Farm	
bypassing	Proxy	36	$170,000	Michael Stidham	Godolphin Stables	
bypassing (Note: Rombauer's connections decided to bypass the Kentucky Derby in preference for a start in The Preakness)	Rombauer	34	$260,500	Michael W. McCarthy	John & Diane Fradkin	
16	Hidden Stash	32	$130,000	Victoria Oliver	BBN Racing	
bypassing (Note: Dream Shake will instead be pointed to the Pat Day Mile)	Dream Shake	30	$126,000	Peter Eurton	Dunwoody Farm	
17	O Besos	25	$116,000	Gregory Foley	L. Barrett Bernard, Tagg Team Racing and West Point Thoroughbreds	
not nominated	Drain the Clock	20	$273,950	Saffie Joseph Jr.	Slam Dunk Racing, Madaket Stables, Wonder Stables & Michael Nentwig	
not nominated	New Treasure (IRE)	20	$271,245	John Gosden	Prince Faisal bin Khaled bin Abdulaziz	
bypass (Note: Although still showing on the official leaderboard, trainer Peter Miller told the Daily Racing Form that Get Her Number would bypass the Derby after an unsatisfactory workout on April 24)	Get Her Number	20	$242,667	Peter Miller	Gary Barber	
bypass (Note: Hozier's connections ruled him out of consideration for the Derby on April 23)	Hozier	20	$230,000	Bob Baffert	WinStar Farm, SF Racing, Starlight Racing, Madaket Stables, Golconda Stables, Siena Farm & Robert Masterson	
~~18~~Scratched (Note: King Fury was scratched when he was diagnosed with a fever.)	~~King Fury~~	20	$207,595	Kenny McPeek	Fern Circle Stables & Three Chimneys Farm	
bypassing	Hockey Dad (Note: Hockey Dad's connections paid a late nomination fee in March)	20	$20,800	Doug F. O'Neill	Reddam Racing	
19	Keepmeinmind (Note: In November 2020 the original owners Southern Equine Stables sold their interests in Keepmeinmind. In February 2021, Spendthrift Farm acquired a 50% share from Cypress Creek Equine and Arnold Bennewith.)	18	$385,707	Robertino Diodoro	Cypress Creek Equine, Arnold Bennewith & Spendthrift Farm	
spell	Spielberg	17	$369,500	Bob Baffert	SF Racing, Starlight Racing, Madaket Stables, Golconda Stables, Siena Farms	
bypassing	Jackie's Warrior	14	$532,500	Steven M. Asmussen	Kirk J. & Judy Robison	
	Nova Rags	14	$111,250	William I. Mott	Michael P. Shanley	
	Unbridled Honor	13	$57,500	Todd Pletcher	Whisper Hill Farm	
retired (Note: Capo Kane was retired after sustaining an injury prior to the Wood Memorial)	Capo Kane	12	$115,500	Harold Wyner	Bing Cherry Racing & Leonard Liberto	
	Papetu	11	$68,425	Antonio Sano	Magic Stables	
	Moonlite Strike	11	$42,500	Saffie Joseph Jr.	Sonata Stable	
not nominated	Hard Rye Guy	11	$14,100	Ian R. Wilkes	Bourbon Lane Stable	
	Risk Taking	10	$155,500	Chad C. Brown	Klaravich Stables	
	Sittin On Go	10	$145,800	Dale L. Romans	Albaugh Family Stables	
not nominated	Taheru Pegasus (JPN)	10	$127,121	Yukihiro Kato	Yasuhiko Mori	
	Candy Man Rocket	10	$120,000	William I. Mott	Frank Fletcher Racing Operations	
20 (Note: Brooklyn Strong's connections were originally planning to bypass the race but decided to add him to the also eligible list on April 24)	Brooklyn Strong	10	$112,500	Daniel Velazquez	Mark Schwartz	
injured	Big Lake	10	$100,000	Steven M. Asmussen	Mike G. Rutherford	
	Hush of a Storm	10	$47,710	William Morey	Joseph P. Morey Jr. Revocable Trust	
	Defunded	10	$45,000	Bob Baffert	Karl Watson, Michael Pegram & Paul Weitman	
	Tarantino	9	$74,650	Rodolphe Brisset	SF Racing, Starlight Racing, Madaket Stables, Golconda Stables, Siena Farms & R. Masterson	
	Roman Centurian	9	$38,000	Simon Callaghan	Alberto Stable & Qatar Racing	
bypassing	Cowan	8	$620,477	Steven M. Asmussen	William & Corinne Heiligbrodt, Madaket Stables & Spendthrift Farm	
bypassing	Freedom Fighter	5	$58,000	Bob Baffert	SF Racing, Starlight Racing, Madaket Stables, Golconda Stables, Siena Farm & Robert Masterson	
not nominated	Reinvestment Risk	4	$120,000	Chad C. Brown	Klaravich Stables	
not nominated (Note: Javanica is a filly that is not nominated for the Kentucky Derby)	Javanica	4	$70,801	Eoin G. Harty	Godolphin Racing	
not nominated	Ten for Ten	4	$50,000	Claude R. McGaughey III	Courtlandt Farms	
bypassing	Overtook	4	$50,000	Todd Pletcher	Repole Stable, St. Elias Stable, Derrick Smith, Mrs. John Magnier & Michael Tabor	
	The Great One	4	$47,000	Doug F. O'Neill	ERJ Racing, Train Wreck Al Racing, Niall Brennan, Tom Fritz & William Strauss	
bypassing	Starrininmydreams	4	$44,000	Dallas Stewart	Stewart Racing Stable & WinStar Farm	
	Smiley Sobotka	4	$40,400	Dale L. Romans	Albaugh Family Stable	
not nominated	Eagle Orb	4	$40,000	Rudy Rodriguez	E.V. Racing Stable	
	Gretzky the Great	2	$223,621	Mark E. Casse	Eclipse Thoroughbred Partners & Gary Barber	
bypassing (Note: Arabian Prince's connections have decided to bypass the Kentucky Derby)	Arabian Prince	2	$28,063	Dallas Stewart	West Point Thoroughbreds & William Sandbrook	
	Waspirant	2	$26,000	John Shirreffs	Martin J. & Pam Wygod and Lessee	
	Petruchio	2	$24,450	Richard E. Mandella	Perry R. Bass II & Ramona S. Bass	
bypassing (Note: Prime Factor's connections have decided to bypass the Kentucky Derby)	Prime Factor	2	$22,200	Todd Pletcher	China Horse Club & WinStar Farm	
inactive	Hold the Salsa	2	$19,125	Richard J. Lugovich	Richard J. Lugovich	
not nominated	Swill	2	$18,600	Brad H. Cox	Kueber Racing & Ten Strike Racing	
inactive	Big Thorn	2	$16,000	Steven M. Asmussen	Alex & Ann Lieblong	
	Parnelli	2	$14,500	John Shirreffs	C R K Stables	
not nominated	Govenor's Party	2	$12,500	Daniel Franko	Daniel Franko	
inactive	Pickin' Time	1	$157,925	Kelly J. Breen	John Bowers Jr.	
	Red Flag	1	$84,000	John Shirreffs	Jerome S. & Tina Moss	
not nominated	Therideofalifetime	1	$39,500	Ignacio Correas, IV	Stephen L. Fidel	
not nominated	Woodhouse	1	$37,500	C. R. Trout	Samuel F. Henderson	
not nominated	It's My House	1	$36,760	Jamey Thomas	Doug Gans, Gary Jacobs, Larry M. Katz & Kevin Riggs	
not nominated	Boca Boy	1	$24,400	Cheryl Winebaugh	Kenneth E. Fishbein	
not nominated	Civil War	1	$20,875	Thomas Albertrani	Mark T. Anderson	
not nominated	Upstriker	1	$20,833	Ron Moquett	William S. Sparks, Brereton C. Jones & Robert V. LaPenta	
bypassing	Santa Cruiser	1	$19,500	J. Keith Desormeaux	Calumet Farm	
not nominated	Royal Number	1	$15,000	Michael J. Trombetta	Larry R. Johnson, R. D. M. Racing Stable & Michael J. Trombetta	

*Mandaloun named was new winner of the race on February 12, 2022, after the original winner Medina Spirit was disqualified after testing positive for Betamethasone. The trainer of Medina Spirit, Bob Baffert got suspended by Churchill Downs for two years.

Legend:
Winner of Kentucky Derby in bold
Entered in the Derby
Injured/Bypassing/Inactive/Not nominated

== Prep season ==
Note: 1st=10 points; 2nd=4 points; 3rd=2 points; 4th=1 point (except the Breeders' Cup Juvenile: 1st=20 points; 2nd=8 points; 3rd=4 points; 4th=2 points)

Race	Distance	Purse	Track	Date	1st	2nd	3rd	4th	Ref
Iroquois	1 mile	$200,000	Churchill Downs	Sep 5 2020	Sittin On Go	Midnight Bourbon	Super Stock	Therideofalifetime	
American Pharoah	1 1/16 miles	$301,000	Santa Anita	Sep 26 2020	Get Her Number	Rombauer	Spielberg	Waspirant	
Breeders' Futurity	1 1/16 miles	$400,000	Keeneland	Oct 3 2020	Essential Quality	Keepmeinmind	Super Stock	Upstriker	
Champagne	1 mile	$250,000	Belmont	Oct 10 2020	Jackie's Warrior	Reinvestment Risk	Midnight Bourbon	Civil War	
Breeders' Cup Juvenile	1 1/16 miles	$2,000,000	Keeneland	Nov 6 2020	Essential Quality	Hot Rod Charlie	Keepmeinmind	Jackie's Warrior	
Kentucky Jockey Club	1 1/16 miles	$200,000	Churchill Downs	Nov 28 2020	Keepmeinmind	Smiley Sobotka	Arabian Prince	Swill	
Remsen	1 1/8 miles	$145,500	Aqueduct	Dec 5 2020	Brooklyn Strong	Ten for Ten	Known Agenda	Pickin' Time	
Springboard Mile	1 mile	$200,000	Remington	Dec 18 2020	Senor Buscador (Note: Horses that ran with medication (Lasix) do not receive any points towards qualification. Senor Buscador, Red N Wild and Saffa's Day received no points from the Springboard Mile.)	Cowan	Red N Wild	Saffa's Day	
Los Alamitos Futurity	1 1/16 miles	$200,500	Los Alamitos	Dec 19 2020	Spielberg	The Great One	Petruchio	Red Flag	
Jerome	1 mile	$145,500	Aqueduct	Jan 1 2021	Capo Kane	Eagle Orb	Hold the Salsa	Swill	
Sham	1 mile	$100,000	Santa Anita	Jan 2 2021	Life Is Good	Medina Spirit	Parnelli	Waspirant	
Lecomte	1 1/16 miles	$200,000	Fair Grounds	Jan 16 2021	Midnight Bourbon	Proxy	Mandaloun	Santa Cruiser	
Smarty Jones	1 mile	$150,000	Oaklawn	Jan 22 2021	Caddo River	Cowan	Big Thorn	Moonlight Strike	
Holy Bull	1 mile	$350,000	Gulfstream	Jan 30 2021	Greatest Honour	Tarantino	Prime Factor	Papetu	
Robert B. Lewis	1 1/16 miles	$100,500	Santa Anita	Jan 30 2021	Medina Spirit	Roman Centurian	Hot Rod Charlie	Spielberg	
Withers	1 1/8 miles	$250,000	Aqueduct	Feb 6 2021	Risk Taking	Overtook	Capo Kane	Royal Number	
Sam F. Davis Stakes	1 1/16 miles	$200,000	Tampa Bay	Feb 6 2021	Candy Man Rocket	Nova Rags	Hidden Stash	Boca Boy	
El Camino Real Derby	1 1/8 miles	$101,350	Golden Gate	Feb 13 2021	Rombauer	Javanica	Govenor's Party	It's My House	
John Battaglia Memorial Stakes	1 1/16 miles	$82,830	Turfway	Feb 26 2021	Hush of a Storm	Like the King	Gretzky the Great	Hard Rye Guy	
Southwest	1 1/16 miles	$750,000	Oaklawn	Feb 27 2021 (Note: The Southwest Stakes was originally scheduled for Presidents' Day, 15 February 2021 but was moved to the following Saturday due to pending inclement weather. However, due to the prolonged inclement weather Oaklawn Park postponed the event for another week.)	Essential Quality	Spielberg	Jackie's Warrior	Woodhouse	

== Championship series events ==
The following events were included as part of the Championship series.

=== First leg of series ===
Note: 1st=50 points; 2nd=20 points; 3rd=10 points; 4th=5 points

Race	Distance	Purse	Grade	Track	Date	1st	2nd	3rd	4th	Ref
Risen Star	1 1/8 miles	$400,000	2	Fair Grounds	Feb 13 2021	Mandaloun	Proxy	Midnight Bourbon	O Besos	
Fountain of Youth	1 1/16 miles	$300,000	2	Gulfstream	Feb 27 2021	Greatest Honour	Drain the Clock	Papetu	Tarantino	
Tampa Bay Derby	1 1/16 miles	$350,000	2	Tampa Bay	Mar 6 2021	Helium	Hidden Stash	Moonlight Strike	Unbridled Honor	
Gotham	1 mile	$300,000	3	Aqueduct	Mar 6 2021	Weyburn	Crowded Trade	Highly Motivated	Freedom Fighter	
San Felipe	1 1/16 miles	$301,000	2	Santa Anita	Mar 6 2021	Life Is Good	Medina Spirit	Dream Shake	Roman Centurian	
Rebel	1 1/16 miles	$1,000,000	2	Oaklawn	Mar 13 2021	Concert Tour	Hozier	Big Lake	Super Stock	
Sunland Derby	1 1/8 miles	$700,000	3	Sunland Park	Mar 30 2021	Cancelled (Note: Due to the COVID-19 pandemic in the United States the New Mexico racing regulator cancelled the Sunland Park meeting for 2021)				

=== Second leg of series ===
These races are the major preps for the Kentucky Derby, and are thus weighted more heavily. Note: 1st=100 points; 2nd=40 points; 3rd=20 points; 4th=10 points

Race	Distance	Purse	Grade	Track	Date	1st	2nd	3rd	4th	Ref
Louisiana Derby	1 3/16 miles	$1,000,000	2	Fair Grounds	Mar 20 2021	Hot Rod Charlie	Midnight Bourbon	O Besos	Proxy	
UAE Derby	1,900 metres (~1 3/16 miles)	$2,000,000	2	Meydan	Mar 27 2021	Rebel's Romance (IRE)	Panadol	New Treasure (IRE)	Takeru Pegasus (JPN)	
Jeff Ruby Steaks	1 1/8 miles	$243,325	3	Turfway	Mar 27 2021	Like The King	Sainthood	Hockey Dad	Hard Rye Guy	
Florida Derby	1 1/8 miles	$770,000	1	Gulfstream	Mar 27 2021	Known Agenda	Soup and Sandwich	Greatest Honour	Nova Rags	
Blue Grass Stakes	1 1/8 miles	$800,000	2	Keeneland	Apr 3 2021	Essential Quality	Highly Motivated	Rombauer	Hidden Stash	
Santa Anita Derby	1 1/8 miles	$752,000	1	Santa Anita	Apr 3 2021	Rock Your World	Medina Spirit	Dream Shake	Defunded	
Wood Memorial	1 1/8 miles	$750,000	2	Aqueduct	Apr 3 2021	Bourbonic	Dynamic One	Crowded Trade	Weyburn	
Arkansas Derby	1 1/8 miles	$1,000,000	1	Oaklawn Park	Apr 10 2021	Super Stock	Caddo River	Concert Tour	Get Her Number	

=== "Wild Card" event ===
Note: 1st=20 points; 2nd=8 points; 3rd=4 points; 4th=2 points

Race	Distance	Purse	Track	Date	1st	2nd	3rd	4th	Ref
Lexington Stakes	1 1/8 miles	$200,000	Keeneland	Apr 10 2021	King Fury	Unbridled Honor	Starrininmydreams	Proxy	

== Japan Road to the Kentucky Derby ==
The Japan Road to the Kentucky Derby is intended to provide a place in the Derby starting gate to the top finisher in the series. If the connections of that horse decline the invitation, their place is offered to the second-place finisher and so on through the top four finishers. If neither of the top four accept, this place in the starting gate reverts to the horses on the main road to the Derby.

Race	Distance	Track	Date	1st	2nd	3rd	4th	Ref
Cattleya Sho	1,600 metres (~1 mile)	Tokyo Racecourse	Nov 28 2020	Lemon Pop	Takeru Pegasus	Plus Ultra	Shin Yomoginesu	
Zen-Nippon Nisai Yushun	1,600 metres (~1 mile)	Kawasaki Racecourse	Dec 16 2020	Alain Barows	Ranryo O	Luce d'Oro	Taisei Again	
Hyacinth	1,600 metres (~1 mile)	Tokyo Racecourse	Feb 21 2021	La Perouse	Probatio	Ladybug	Takeru Pegasus	
Fukuryu	1,800 metres (~1 1/8 miles)	Nakayama Racecourse	Mar 27 2021	God Selection	Meisho Murakumo	Gold Higher	Taisei Again	

Note: Cattleya Sho: 1st=10 points; 2nd=4 points; 3rd=2 points; 4th=1 point
Zen-Nippon Nisai Yushun: 1st=20 points; 2nd=8 points; 3rd=4 points; 4th=2 points
Hyacinth: 1st=30 points; 2nd=12 points; 3rd=6 points; 4th=3 points
Fukuyru : 1st=40 points; 2nd=16 points; 3rd=8 points; 4th=4 points

Qualification Table

The top four horses (colored brown within the standings) are eligible to participate in the Kentucky Derby provided the horse is nominated.

Rank	Horse	Points	Eligible Earnings	Trainer	Owner	Ref
1	God Selection	40	$309,883	Teiichi Konno		
2	La Perouse	30	$264,868	Kazuo Fujisawa		
3	Alain Barows	20	$781,045	Masato Hayashi		
4	Meisho Murakumo	16	$218,390	Yusuke Wada		
5	Probatio	12	$192,317	Tsuyoshi Tanaka		
6	Lemon Pop	10	$223,757	Hiroyasu Tanaka		
7	Ranryo O	8	$464,673	Satoshi Kokubo		
8	Gold Higher	8	$206,298	Ryuji Okubo		
9	Takeru Pegasus	7	$202,970	Yukhiro Kato		
10	Taisei Again	6	$230,033	Takeshi Matsushita		
11	Ladybug	6	$179,923	Yoshihito Kitade		
12	Luce d'Oro	4	$308,574	Yutaka Takahashi		
13	Plus Ultra	2	$155,794	Takahisa Tezuka		
14	Shin Yomoginesu	1	$105,547	Keizo Ito		

Notes:

- brown highlight – qualified
- grey highlight – did not qualify

== European Road to the Kentucky Derby ==
The European Road to the Kentucky Derby is designed on a similar basis to the Japan Road and is intended to provide a place in the Derby starting gate to the top finisher in the series. If the connections of that horse decline the invitation, their place is offered to the second-place finisher and so on. If neither of the top four accept, this place in the starting gate reverts to the horses on the main road to the Derby.

The series consists of seven races – four run on the turf in late 2020 when the horses are age two, plus three races run on a synthetic surface in early 2021.

Race	Distance	Track	Date	1st	2nd	3rd	4th	Ref
Royal Lodge Stakes	1 mile	Newmarket	Sep 26 2020	New Mandate	Ontario	Cobh	Gear Up	
Beresford Stakes	1 mile	The Curragh	Sep 26 2020	High Definition	Monaasib	Snapraeterea	Sir Lucan	
Prix Jean-Luc Lagardère	1,600 metres (about 1 mile)	Longchamp	Oct 4 2020	Sealiway	Nando Parrado	Laws Of Indices	Libertine	
Vertem Futurity Trophy	1 mile	Doncaster	Oct 24 2020	Mac Swiney	One Ruler	Baradar	Cobh	
Road to the Kentucky Derby Conditions Stakes	1 mile	Kempton Park	Mar 3 2021	Highland Avenue	Sergeant Tibbs	Oo De Lally	Bodroy	
Patton Stakes	1 mile	Dundalk	Mar 5 2021	My Generation	Rocky Sky	Messidor	Rebel Step	
Cardinal Stakes	1 mile	Chelmsford City	Apr 1 2021	Fundamental	Qaader	Moraaheq	Quintillus	

Note:

- the four races in 2020 for two-year-olds: 1st=10 points; 2nd=4 points; 3rd=2 points; 4th=1 point
- the first two races in 2021: 1st=20 points; 2nd=8 points; 3rd=4 points; 4th=2 points
- The Cardinal Condition Stakes: 1st=30 points; 2nd=12 points; 3rd=6 points; 4th=3 points

Qualification Table

The top four horses (colored brown within the standings) are eligible to participate in the Kentucky Derby provided the horse is nominated.

Rank	Horse	Points	Eligible Earnings	Trainer	Owner	Ref
1	Fundamental	30	$0	John & Thady Gosden		
2	My Generation	20	$26,490	Joseph O'Brien		
3	Highland Avenue	20	$0	Charlie Appleby		
4	Qaader	12	$26,568	Mark Johnston		
5	Sealiway	10	$235,281	Frederic Rossi	Le Haras de La Gousserie & Guy Pariente	
6	Mac Swiney	10	$232,127	Jim Bolger	Jackie Bolger	
7	New Mandate	10	$90,436	Ralph Beckett		
8	High Definition	10	$55,830	Aidan O'Brien		
9	Rocky Sky	8	$8,531	Ross O'Sullivan		
10	Sergeant Tibbs	8	$0	Robyn Brisland		
11	Moraaheq	6	$0	Roger Varian		
12	Nando Parrado	4	$164,769	Clive Cox		
13	One Ruler	4	$101,005	Charlie Appleby		
14	Ontario	4	$49,261	Aidan O'Brien		
15	Monaasib	4	$17,680	Kevin Prendergast		
16	Messidor	4	$4,041	Joseph O'Brien		
17	Oo De Lally	4	$0	Andrew Balding		
18	Cobh	3	$52,500	Clive Cox		
19	Quintillus	3	$0	Charlie Appleby		
20	Laws of Indices	2	$95,500	Ken Condon		
21	Baradar	2	$31,380	Roger Varian		
22	Snapraeterea	2	$24,574	Joseph O'Brien		
23	Rebel Step	2	$1,796	Andrew Slattery		
24	Bodroy	2	$0	John Butler		
25	Gear Up	1	$138,515	Mark Johnston	Teme Valley 2	
26	Libertine	1	$25,155	Fabrice Vermeulen		
27	Sir Lucan	1	$3,722	Aidan O'Brien		

Notes:

- brown highlight – qualified
- grey highlight – did not qualify

== See also ==
- 2021 Road to the Kentucky Oaks
