= Rombauer (horse) =

American thoroughbred racehorse

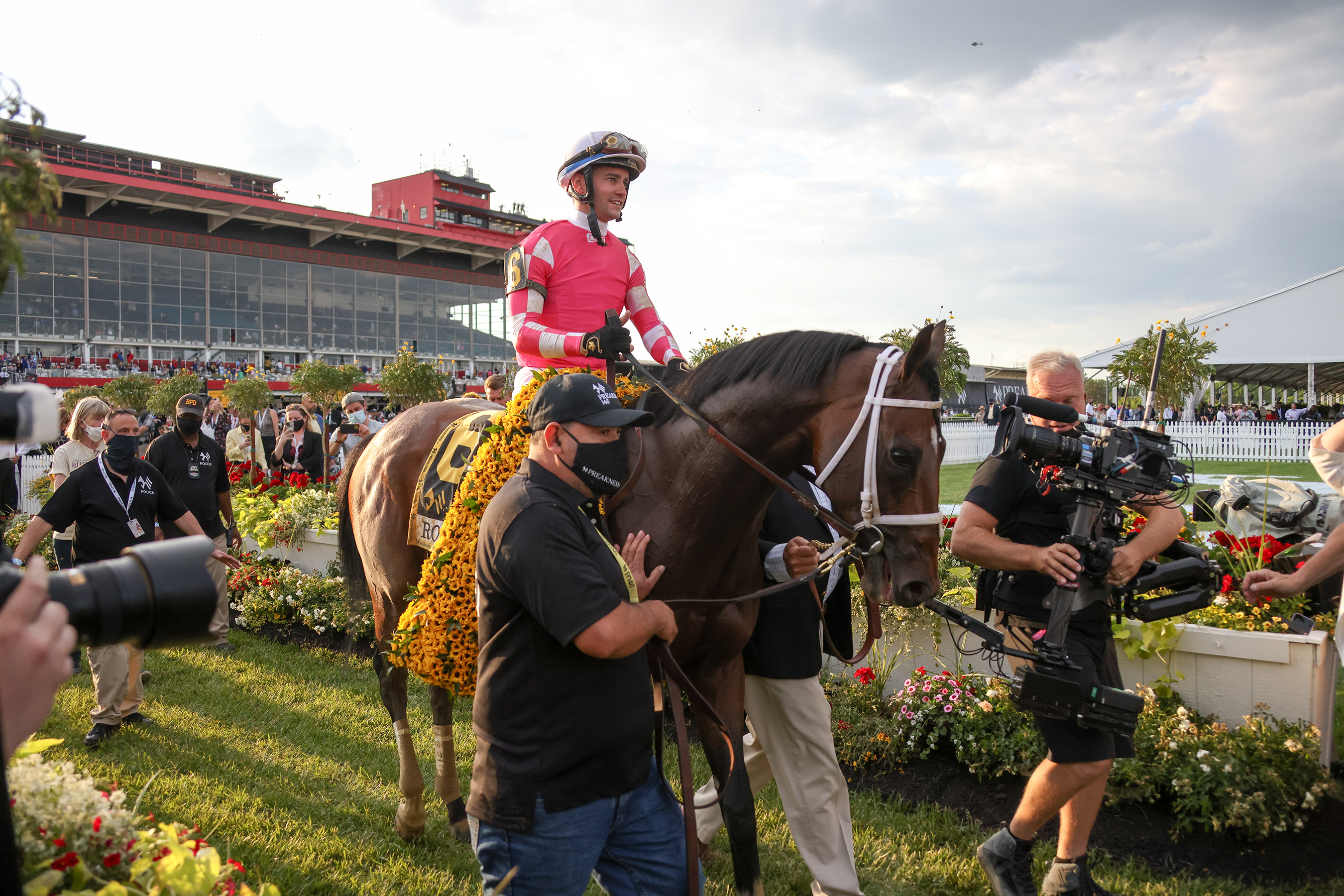
- Sire: Twirling Candy
- Grandsire: Candy Ride
- Dam: Cashmere
- Damsire: Cowboy Cal
- Sex: Colt
- Foaled: April 17, 2018
- Country: United States
- Color: Bay
- Breeder: Diane & John Fradkin
- Trainer: Michael W. McCarthy
- Record: 8: 3-1-2
- Earnings: $1,040,500

Major wins
- El Camino Real Derby (2021) Triple Crown Race wins: Preakness Stakes (2021)
- Last updated on June 5, 2021

Rombauer (born on April 17, 2018) is an American Thoroughbred racehorse who won the 2021 Preakness Stakes.

== Background ==
Rombauer is a bay colt who was foaled on April 17, 2018, at Machmer Hall in Paris, Kentucky. He was bred by John and Diane Fradkin, and races for them as a homebred. The Fradkins have been small breeders since 1997 when they retired Ultrafleet, who had been relatively unsuccessful on the racetrack. However, she became an outstanding producer, with offspring including Breeders' Cup Turf Sprint winner California Flag and multiple graded stakes winner Cambiocorsa, the granddam (grandmother) of Roaring Lion. Ultrafleet also produced Cashmere, an unraced daughter of Cowboy Cal, who they bred to Twirling Candy to produce Rombauer. He was her fourth foal, all of them winners.

The Fradkins normally breed horses to sell at auction, and Rombauer was being pointed towards the April 2020 Ocala Breeders' Sale for two-year-olds in training. However, because of the COVID-19 pandemic, the sale was delayed and the Fradkins decided to keep the colt. They sent him into training with Michael McCarthy in California.

== Racing career ==
=== 2020: two-year-old campaign ===
Rombauer made his first start on July 25, 2020, in a maiden special weight race at Del Mar over a distance of one mile on the turf. He broke slowly and was near the back of the field turning into the stretch. Still in sixth place with a furlong remaining, he accelerated rapidly and won by half a length.

On September 7, Rombauer finished sixth in the Del Mar Juvenile Turf Stakes after getting bumped at the start. Despite the loss, McCarthy was impressed with how the colt was training in the morning on the main (dirt) track and recommended entering him in the Grade I American Pharoah Stakes at Santa Anita. Rombauer was a longshot at odds of 12–1 in a field of seven in which the heavy favorite was Spielberg. Rombauer again broke poorly and raced at the back of the pack for the first half-mile, trailing by as much as seven lengths. On the final turn, he swung four-wide and was in fifth-place after three-quarters of a mile. In the stretch, he steadily closed ground on Get Her Number but came up three-quarters of a length short. Spielberg was a further 4 3/4 lengths back in third.

Rombauer made his final start of the year in the Breeders' Cup Juvenile on November 6 at Keeneland. In a very deep field of 14, he went off at odds of 26–1. He was far back in the early running, trailing the early leaders by 13 lengths after half a mile. He was still in eighth place after running three to five wide around the final turn, but closed well in the final furlong to finish fifth.

=== 2021: three-year-old campaign ===
On February 13, 2021, Rombauer made his three-year-old debut in the El Camino Real Derby at Golden Gate Fields, run over a synthetic "all weather" surface. He went off as the 6-5 favorite in a field of eight. Once again, he was well back in the early running then swung wide around the final turn to move into contention. With a steady run down the stretch, he closed to win by a neck over Javanica. "I was a little concerned how far back he was, and coming into the far turn I thought we had an awful lot to do", said McCarthy. "But coming to the three-eighths pole he started leveling off and then he was barreling down. I thought it would be close, and he was just classy enough to get his head down at the wire."

For Rombauer's next start, McCarthy decided to ship the colt to Keeneland in Kentucky for the Blue Grass Stakes on April 3. John Fradkin stated that this "was primarily an ABB decision", meaning that he wished to avoid Bob Baffert (ABB) and his talented stable of horses while prepping for the Kentucky Derby. However, the field came up fairly deep, including juvenile champion Essential Quality. Rombauer was overlooked at odds of 24–1 in the field of nine. Despite being bumped at the start, he raced much closer to the early pace than he had in the past, stalking in third place behind Essential Quality and Highly Motivated. However, he lacked his usual closing speed and remained in third, beaten by 5 3/4 lengths.

His performances earned Rombauer enough points to qualify on the 2021 Road to the Kentucky Derby, but the Fradkins decided to bypass that race in favor of the Preakness. "Rombauer's running style is not conducive to what's been winning the Kentucky Derby lately," explained John Fradkin. "The Preakness is usually an easier spot since you get the Derby winner and only a few others from there. If he ran in the Derby, he would have gotten hot and dirty and not earned any money and probably missed the Preakness. I feel when you have a good stakes horse, and he's going to run the best race ever, you want to earn some money and he had a much better chance of doing that here [in the Preakness] than in the Derby."

==== Preakness Stakes ====
On May 15, Rombauer was entered in the Preakness Stakes at Pimlico, where he went off at odds of 12–1 in a field of ten. A co-favorite along with Midnight Bourbon was Medina Spirit, who had crossed the finish line first in the Kentucky Derby but was facing disqualification due to a positive drug test. Medina Spirit went to the early lead and was pressed by Midnight Bourbon to set a solid pace. Rombauer rated some four lengths behind in sixth place. Jockey Flavien Prat, riding the horse for the first time, saved ground around the turns then swung the colt wide in the stretch to find racing room. Rombauer closed quickly and drew away to win by 3 1/2 lengths over Midnight Bourbon, with Medina Spirit two more lengths back in third. Rombauer covered the 1 3/16 mile distance in 1:53.62.

"I think the whole card for this horse is his stamina and his smarts", said McCarthy. "He will, I think, run as far as they write races. He has no quit in him. All he knows to do is just run, and he lays it down every time."

Fradkin said that Rombauer had a 50-50 chance of making his next start in the Haskell Stakes. Fradkin also liked the idea of entering the colt in one or more of the Turf Triple races offered over the summer by the New York Racing Association.

==== Belmont Stakes ====
On June 5, Rombauer finished third in the Belmont Stakes at Belmont Park, 12 1/2 lengths back from winner Essential Quality, who finished 1 1/4 lengths ahead of Hot Rod Charlie in second place.

=== 2023: five-year-old campaign ===
Rombauer returned to training after a two-year break at Gulfstream Park under trainer Saffie Joseph Jr.'s care with a possible return to competitive racing."

== Breeding career ==
Retired in 2024, Rombauer stands at War Horse Place, Lexington, Kentucky for a fee of $6,000.

== Statistics ==
Date	Distance	Race	Grade	Track	Odds	Field	Finish	Winning Time	Winning (Losing) Margin	Jockey	Ref
2020 – two-year-old season
Jul 25, 2020	1 mile	Maiden Special Weight		Del Mar	16.70	8	1	1:38.30	1/2 length	Juan Hernandez	
Sep 7, 2020	1 mile	Del Mar Juvenile Turf	Listed	Del Mar	4.10	10	6	1:38.21	(2 lengths)	Juan Hernandez	
Sep 26, 2020	1 1/16 miles	American Pharoah Stakes	I	Santa Anita	11.70	7	2	1:44.92	(3/4 lengths)	Mike Smith	
Nov 6, 2020	1 1/16 miles	Breeders' Cup Juvenile	I	Keeneland	26.00	14	5	1:42.09	(6 1/4 lengths)	Javier Castellano	
2021 – three-year-old season
Feb 13, 2021	1 1/8 miles	El Camino Real Derby	Listed	Golden Gate Fields	1.20*	8	1	1:51.64	Neck	Kyle Frey	
Apr 3, 2021	1 1/8 miles	Blue Grass Stakes	II	Keeneland	24.00	8	3	1:48.50	(5 3/4 lengths)	Florent Geroux	
May 15, 2021	1 3/16 miles	Preakness Stakes	I	Pimlico	11.80	10	1	1:53.62	3 1/2 lengths	Flavien Prat	
Jun 5, 2021	1 1/2 miles	Belmont Stakes	I	Belmont Park	5.60	8	3	2:27.11	(12 1/2 lengths)	John R. Velazquez	

Note:
An asterisk (*) after the odds means Rombauer was the post-time favorite.
Legend:
All Weather Track Dirt Turf

== Pedigree ==
Pedigree of Rombauer, bay colt, foaled April 17, 2018
Sire Twirling Candy	Candy Ride	Ride the Rails	Cryptoclearance
Sire Twirling Candy	Candy Ride	Ride the Rails	Herbalesian
Sire Twirling Candy	Candy Ride	Candy Girl	Candy Stripes
Sire Twirling Candy	Candy Ride	Candy Girl	City Girl
Sire Twirling Candy	House of Danzing	Chester House	Mr. Prospector
Sire Twirling Candy	House of Danzing	Chester House	Toussaud
Sire Twirling Candy	House of Danzing	Danzing Crown	Danzig
Sire Twirling Candy	House of Danzing	Danzing Crown	Crownette
Dam Cashmere	Cowboy Cal	Giant's Causeway	Storm Cat
Dam Cashmere	Cowboy Cal	Giant's Causeway	Mariah's Storm
Dam Cashmere	Cowboy Cal	Texas Tammy	Seeking the Gold
Dam Cashmere	Cowboy Cal	Texas Tammy	Hot Novel
Dam Cashmere	Ultrafleet	Afleet	Mr. Prospector
Dam Cashmere	Ultrafleet	Afleet	Polite Lady
Dam Cashmere	Ultrafleet	Social Conduct	Vigors
Dam Cashmere	Ultrafleet	Social Conduct	Jostling Queen
