= Mandaloun (horse) =

American Thoroughbred racehorse

- Mandaloun before the 2022 Stephen Foster Stakes
- Sire: Into Mischief
- Grandsire: Harlan's Holiday
- Dam: Brooch
- Damsire: Empire Maker
- Sex: Colt
- Foaled: March 18, 2018; Kentucky
- Country: United States
- Color: bay
- Breeder: Juddmonte
- Owner: Juddmonte
- Trainer: Brad H. Cox
- Record: 12: 7–0–1
- Earnings: $3,356,052

Major wins
- Risen Star Stakes (2021); Pegasus Stakes (2021); Haskell Stakes (2021); Louisiana Stakes (2022); American Triple Crown wins: Kentucky Derby (2021)
- Last updated on 1 August 2022

Mandaloun (foaled March 18, 2018) is an American retired Thoroughbred racehorse who was awarded 1st place in the 2021 Kentucky Derby after the disqualification of the original winner Medina Spirit. He followed this with wins in both the Pegasus Stakes and Haskell Stakes (the latter of which was also won via disqualification). He also won the 2021 Risen Star Stakes, and the 2022 Louisiana Stakes.

== Background ==
Mandaloun is a bay colt who was foaled in Kentucky. He is ridden by jockey Florent Geroux and trained by Brad H. Cox. The horse is named for a mandaloun, "a type of mullioned (or decorative partition) window from traditional Lebanese architecture".

== Racing career ==
=== 2020: Two-year-old season ===
Mandaloun made his first start in a maiden race on October 24, 2020, at Keeneland over 6 furlongs. He won this race by 1/2 lengths in a time of 1:11.76. His second start came on November 28 in an Allowance Optional Claiming race at Churchill Downs over 7 furlongs. He won in a time of 1:23.15 by 1 1/4 lengths.

=== 2021: Three-year-old season ===
Mandaloun made his first start as a three year old and his stakes debut in the Lecomte Stakes on January 16, 2021, at Fair Grounds over a distance of 1 1/16 miles. He finished third. Midnight Bourbon won by 1 length, Proxy was second by a head, the fourth place was 8 3/4 lengths behind the top three.

On February 13, Mandaloun started again against Midnight Bourbon and Proxy in the Risen Star Stakes, over a distance of 1 1/8 miles. This time Mandaloun turned the tables and defeated Proxy by 1 1/4 lengths and Midnight Bourbon by 1 3/4 lengths. The other horses were 5 3/4 lengths or more behind the top three. The final time was 1:50.30.

His last prep race for the 2021 Kentucky Derby was the Louisiana Derby; again he started against Midnight Bourbon and Proxy, but this time another rival, Hot Rod Charlie, started. Immediately after the start, Hot Rod Charlie took the lead and won wire to wire in track record time. Midnight Bourbon held on to finish second by a head while Mandaloun finished in a disappointing seventh place. Since neither Brad Cox nor Mandaloun's jockey Florent Geroux knew why he ran so badly, they brought him to Churchill Downs for the Kentucky Derby.

==== Kentucky Derby ====
On May 1, 2021, he was a long shot in the Kentucky Derby. The favorites were Essential Quality, his stablemate (winner of the Blue Grass Stakes), Rock Your World (winner of the Santa Anita Derby), and Hot Rod Charlie (winner of the Louisiana Derby). Other good horses in the running were Known Agenda (winner of the Florida Derby), Highly Motivated (runner-up in the Blue Grass Stakes), Medina Spirit (runner-up in the Santa Anita Derby), and his old rival Midnight Bourbon (runner-up in the Louisiana Derby). Mandaloun started well and was fourth. He slowly moved up and challenged the leader, Medina Spirit. Behind him, Hot Rod Charlie and his stablemate Essential Quality began to move up. There were four horses in the stretch. Medina Spirit won by 1/2 length, Mandaloun was second with 1/2 length, third was Hot Rod Charlie with a head to stablemate Essential Quality. 5th placed O Besos was 4 1/2 lengths behind them.

After the Kentucky Derby, an investigation was launched because of doping issues with Medina Spirit, who died on December 6, 2021; there was also an investigation of his trainer, Bob Baffert.

On February 21, 2022, upon the disqualification of Medina Spirit, Mandaloun was awarded first place in the 2021 Kentucky Derby.

==== Later three-year-old season ====
Mandaloun skipped the next two legs of the Triple Crown, the Preakness Stakes won by Rombauer and Belmont Stakes won by Essential Quality.

Mandaloun made his next start in the 1 1/16 mile Pegasus Stakes at Monmouth Park on June 13, a local prep for the Haskell Stakes. He held on to win by a neck over a closing Weyburn in a final time of 1:44.63.

He then ran in the Grade 1 Haskell Stakes at Monmouth Park on July 17. He crossed the finish line second in a photo finish with Belmont runner up Hot Rod Charlie. However, Hot Rod Charlie was quickly disqualified for having impeded the path of Midnight Bourbon which caused him to throw his rider Paco Lopez, so Mandaloun was declared the official winner.

The following month, Garrett O’Rourke, the racing manager at Juddmonte, announced that Mandaloun would be taken out of training for about six weeks due to a foot sore, likely missing the remainder of the 2021 racing season. He added the horse would be aimed toward a potential start in the 2022 Saudi Cup.

=== 2022: Four-year-old season ===
On January 22, resuming for his four-year-old season Mandaloun out dueled his rival Midnight Bourbon in the GIII Louisiana Stakes at Fair Grounds as the 9/10 odds-on favorite by 3/4 lengths, running the 1 1/16 miles distance in 1:42.52. This would be his last victory, as he would have 3 more sub par finishes before retirement.

On September 13, it was announced that Mandaloun was retired from racing and would stand at Juddmonte USA at Lexington, Kentucky and that they set his stud fee at $25,000.

== Racing statistics ==
Date	Race	Racecourse	Grade	Distance	Finish	Margin	Time	Weight	Odds	Jockey	Ref
2020 – two-year-old season
24 Oct	Maiden	Keeneland		6 furlongs	1	. 1/2 length	1:11.76	119 lbs	1.10*	Florent Geroux	
28 Nov	Allowance	Churchill Downs		7 furlongs	1	1 1/4 lengths	1:23.15	122 lbs	1.10*	Florent Geroux	
2021 – three-year-old season
16 Jan	Lecomte Stakes	Fair Grounds	III	1 1/16 miles	3	(1 1/4 length)	1:44.41	122 lbs	0.80*	Florent Geroux	
13 Feb	Risen Star Stakes	Fair Grounds	II	1 1/8 miles	1	1 1/4 lengths	1:50.39	122 lbs	2.10*	Florent Geroux	
20 Mar	Louisiana Derby	Fair Grounds	II	1 3/16 miles	6	(12 lengths)	1:55.06	122 lbs	1.30*	Florent Geroux	
1 May	Kentucky Derby	Churchill Downs	I	1 1/4 miles	1 (Note: Mandaloun originally finished second but was later placed first after the original winner, Medina Spirit, was disqualified due to a medication violation.)	( 1/2 length)	2:01.02	126 lbs	26.90	Florent Geroux	
13 Jun	Pegasus Stakes	Monmouth Park	Listed	1 1/16 miles	1	neck	1:44.63	122 lbs	0.30*	Florent Geroux	
17 July	Haskell Stakes	Monmouth Park	I	1 1/8 miles	1 (Note: In the Haskell Stakes Mandaloun was promoted to first place after finishing second by a nose to Hot Rod Charlie who was first past the winning post but was disqualified and placed seventh (last) for interfering in the stretch run clipping Midnight Bourbon who dislodged his rider Paco Lopez.)	(nose)	1:47.38	119 lbs	3.10	Florent Geroux	
2022 – four-year-old season
22 Jan	Louisiana Stakes	Fair Grounds	III	1 1/16 miles	1	3/4 length	1:42.52	118 lbs	0.90*	Florent Geroux	
26 Feb	Saudi Cup	King Abdulaziz	I	1,800 meters	9	(18 3/4 lengths)	1:50.52	126 lbs	-- (Note: Wagering is not allowed in Saudi Arabia.)	Florent Geroux	
2 Jul	Stephen Foster Stakes	Churchill Downs	II	1 1/8 miles	4	(5 lengths)	1:47.66	121 lbs	2.30	Florent Geroux	
30 Jul	San Diego Handicap	Del Mar	II	1 1/16 miles	4	(7 1/4 lengths)	1:42.75	121 lbs	4.00	Florent Geroux	

== Pedigree ==
Pedigree of Mandaloun, bay colt, foaled March 18, 2018
Sire Into Mischief	Harlan's Holiday	Harlan	Storm Cat
Sire Into Mischief	Harlan's Holiday	Harlan	Country Romance
Sire Into Mischief	Harlan's Holiday	Christmas in Aiken	Affirmed
Sire Into Mischief	Harlan's Holiday	Christmas in Aiken	Dowager
Sire Into Mischief	Leslie's Lady	Tricky Creek	Clever Trick
Sire Into Mischief	Leslie's Lady	Tricky Creek	Battle Creek Girl
Sire Into Mischief	Leslie's Lady	Crystal Lady	Stop The Music
Sire Into Mischief	Leslie's Lady	Crystal Lady	One Last Bird
Dam Brooch	Empire Maker	Unbridled	Fappiano
Dam Brooch	Empire Maker	Unbridled	Gana Facil
Dam Brooch	Empire Maker	Toussaud	El Gran Senor
Dam Brooch	Empire Maker	Toussaud	Image of Reality
Dam Brooch	Daring Diva	Dansili	Danehill
Dam Brooch	Daring Diva	Dansili	Hasili
Dam Brooch	Daring Diva	Aspiring Diva	Distant View
Dam Brooch	Daring Diva	Aspiring Diva	Queen of Song
