= Medina Spirit =

American thoroughbred horse (2018–2021)

- Medina Spirit's grave at Old Friends Equine
- Sire: Protonico
- Grandsire: Giant's Causeway
- Dam: Mongolian Changa
- Damsire: Brilliant Speed
- Sex: Colt
- Foaled: April 5, 2018; Ocala, Florida, U.S.
- Died: December 6, 2021 (aged 3); Santa Anita Park, Arcadia, California, U.S.
- Country: United States
- Color: Dark Bay
- Breeder: Gail Rice
- Owner: Zedan Racing Stables (Amr Zedan)
- Trainer: Bob Baffert
- Record: 10: 4–4–1
- Earnings: $3,545,200

Major wins
- Robert B. Lewis Stakes (2021); Shared Belief Stakes (2021); Awesome Again Stakes (2021)
- Last updated on February 21, 2022

Medina Spirit (April 5, 2018 – December 6, 2021) was an American Thoroughbred racehorse who finished first in the 2021 Kentucky Derby before being disqualified. He came second in the 2021 Breeders' Cup Classic and third in the 2021 Preakness Stakes.

Medina Spirit qualified for the Kentucky Derby with a win in the Robert B. Lewis Stakes and second-place finishes in the San Felipe Stakes and Santa Anita Derby. In the Kentucky Derby he was a long shot with post-time odds of 12–1. He crossed the finish line first in the Derby, but was later disqualified after testing positive for the anti-inflammatory steroid betamethasone. After the Kentucky Derby, Medina Spirit finished third in the Preakness Stakes, but a few days later the New York racing officials banned Medina Spirit and his trainer Bob Baffert from participating in the Belmont Stakes because of the drug violations. Later that year, Medina Spirit won the Shared Belief Stakes and Awesome Again Stakes before coming second in the Breeders' Cup Classic.

== Background ==
Medina Spirit was a dark bay colt bred in Florida by Gail Rice. He was from the first crop of multiple graded stakes winner Protonico, who stands at Castleton Farm. Protonico is by Giant's Causeway, who was a multiple Group I winner in Europe, nicknamed the Iron Horse. Giant's Causeway was later a leading sire in North America. Medina Spirit was the first foal produced by Mongolian Changa, a daughter of Brilliant Speed, who won one of six starts.

Medina Spirit was foaled on April 5, 2018, on a 10-acre farm in Ocala, Florida. His dam was at first unable to produce milk for him. Rice used some colostrum that had been saved from another mare, providing the foal with crucial nutrients and antibodies. Mongolian Changa soon began to nurse normally and the colt developed into a "standout", known for his competitive spirit.

Medina Spirit attracted little attention when he was entered in the Ocala Breeders Sale of January 2019. He was sold for the minimum $1,000 (meaning he received only one bid) to Christy Whitman, who later resold the colt to bloodstock agent Gary Young who purchased him for $35,000 for Amr Zedan at the Ocala July Two-Year-Old Sale. Zedan had been interested in the colt in part because one of his friends, Oussama Aboughazale, had owned Protonico. Zedan named the horse for Medina, the second holiest city in Islam after Mecca and also the capital of the Medina Province of Saudi Arabia. Medina is the hometown of both Zedan and Aboughazale.

Medina Spirit was sent into training with Hall of Famer Bob Baffert, initially under assistant Mike Marlow. Medina Spirit kept surprising his connections by outworking the more expensive colts that Baffert's stable is known to attract. "He reminded me of Silver Charm", said Baffert, referring to his first Derby winner from 1997. "He doesn't know how much he cost."

Medina Spirit traces to the thoroughbred family numbered 2-n, and was its first Kentucky Derby winner.

== Racing career ==
=== 2020: Two-year-old season ===
In his only race as a two-year-old, Medina Spirit won his debut in a maiden special weight race over 5 1/2 furlongs at Los Alamitos Race Course on December 11, 2020. He vied for the early lead with Sensemaker, running the first quarter-mile in 22.20. He took the lead turning for home and kicked clear to win by three lengths.

=== 2021: Three-year-old season ===
Medina Spirit made his first start as a three-year-old in the Sham Stakes at Santa Anita Park on January 2, 2021. The heavy favorite was Life Is Good, another Baffert trainee who was also coming off a maiden race win. Life Is Good went to the early lead and set sensible fractions while maintaining an advantage of three to four lengths down the backstretch and into the stretch. Medina Spirit, who had raced in second throughout, made a late run to close to within three-quarters of a length, with the third-place finisher 13 lengths further back. "They've got four months to improve", said Baffert, referring to the upcoming Kentucky Derby. "We need to let them mature and keep them healthy."

His next start was in the Robert B. Lewis Stakes on January 30, where he went off as the even money favorite in a field of six. He went to the early lead and turned into the stretch with a one length lead. Hot Rod Charlie then started to inch closer, closing to within half a length in midstretch. From further back, Roman Centurion also started to close ground rapidly. In a blanket finish, Medina Spirit hung on to win by a neck over Roman Centurion, with Hot Rod Charlie a nose behind in third. "He had every reason to give it up late in the stretch (when) those horses came to him", Baffert said. "I thought he was beat. I thought they were going to get by and he wouldn't let them by."

Medina Spirit made his next start in the San Felipe Stakes on March 6. He was the second betting choice to Life Is Good, who went to the early lead and was never challenged, winning by eight lengths over Medina Spirit, with Dream Shake third. After the race, Baffert had minor throat surgery performed on the colt to improve his breathing.

He came second again in his final Derby prep, the Santa Anita Derby on April 3. Rock Your World, in his first start on the dirt, unexpectedly went to the early lead and pulled away in the stretch over Medina Spirit with Dream Shake again in third. "The horse ran well," said jockey John Velazquez, “but the winner took the lead on a fast track and kept running. My horse kept coming and kept coming but couldn't catch up."

==== Kentucky Derby ====
The 2021 Kentucky Derby, held on May 1, 2021, at Churchill Downs, attracted a deep field of 19. The favorite was the undefeated champion Essential Quality, who had won the Breeders' Cup Juvenile and Blue Grass Stakes. Other highly regarded contenders included Rock Your World (Santa Anita Derby), Known Agenda (Florida Derby), Hot Rod Charlie (Louisiana Derby), and Mandaloun (Risen Star Stakes). Medina Spirit was largely overlooked at odds of 12–1.

Velazquez decided to change tactics for the race after having rated the colt in the Santa Anita Derby. Instead, he sent Medina Spirit to the early lead, running the first quarter-mile in :23.09. They avoided a potential pace duel when Known Agenda broke poorly on the rail and Rock Your World got bumped at the start. Instead, Soup and Sandwich pressed the pace for the first three-quarters, then fell back and eventually finished last. Mandaloun closed to within a head as the field turned for home, with Hot Rod Charlie close behind. Medina Spirit and Mandaloun battled down the stretch with Medina Spirit pulling clear in the final strides to win by half a length. Hot Rod Charlie was another half length back in third and Essential Quality a further head behind in fourth.

Zedan Racing Stables won the Derby only five years after its founding. Zedan said, "Naturally it was the Kentucky Derby, right? That's the show. That's what Bob said — that's the show, that's why we are here. I feel blessed, honored and humbled. I've rehearsed this speech in the shower and on the treadmill. Never thought I was going to do it, but here I am." Medina Spirit earned $1,860,000 by winning the race.

One week after the Kentucky Derby was run, Baffert's assistant Jimmy Barnes was informed by the Kentucky Horse Racing Commission that post-race testing on Medina Spirit showed 21 pg/mL of the anti-inflammatory steroid betamethasone. In Kentucky, betamethasone is classified as a Class C drug that is permitted for therapeutic use in horses, but requires a 14-day withdrawal time. Any amount of the drug detected in post-race testing is a violation and could result in a disqualification. In a news conference on May 9, Baffert said that Medina Spirit was never administered betamethasone. In addition to a request for a split drug sample, Baffert also requested an independent DNA and follicle test. He told reporters that he would fight the issue "...tooth and nail because I owe it to the horse, I owe it to the owner, and I owe it to our industry." Shortly thereafter, Churchill Downs suspended Baffert from entering any horses at their racetrack pending the outcome of the commission's investigation. Baffert also added that he felt that the horse was a victim of "cancel culture". At one point, Baffert theorized that, prior to the race, Medina Spirit might have eaten hay on which a groom who had taken cough medication had urinated.

On May 11, 2021, Baffert released a statement through his attorney saying that veterinarians treated Medina Spirit with Onomax, an antifungal ointment, from after the horse's second-place finish in the Santa Anita Derby until the day before the Kentucky Derby. Baffert claimed that Onomax was used to treat dermatitis on the horse's hind end, and that he did not realize the ointment had betamethasone until after the positive test was reported. Baffert said he never attempted to "game the system or get an unfair advantage", and quoted pharmacologists who told him that "21 picograms of betamethasone would have no effect on the outcome of the race."

On June 2, 2021, Baffert's attorneys announced that Medina Spirit's split sample also came back positive for betamethasone. They also announced that a third test had been authorized that would help detect chemicals to potentially support Baffert's claim that the steroid came from Onomax and not an injection. One lawyer, Clark Brewster, argued that he did not see any paperwork to show that the first two tests were properly administered. He also alleged that the horse's connections requested both bloodwork and urine to be submitted for split sampling, but only the bloodwork was sent. Later that same day, Churchill Downs announced that Bob Baffert would be banned from entering horses at all Churchill Downs-owned racetracks in the United States for two years. In June Baffert filed suit in Franklin County, Kentucky civil court for more tests to be conducted before Medina Spirit could be stripped of his derby win, hoping to prove the presence of the aforementioned ointment Onomax which incidentally contains betamethasone and thus establishing that the "spirit of regulations" were not "knowingly violated".

Medina Spirit was ranked first in the NTRA 3-year-old poll, a weekly ranking of thoroughbreds by horse racing columnists and journalists, after his win in the Kentucky Derby. Following the report of the failed drug test, Medina Spirit dropped to fourth place in the same poll.

Two sets of bettors have filed class action lawsuits against Medina Spirit's trainer Bob Baffert accusing him of "fraud, racketeering and negligence".

On February 21, 2022, the Kentucky Horse Racing Commission disqualified Medina Spirit from his first-place finish in the Kentucky Derby and suspended trainer Bob Baffert for 90 days. Baffert's attorney, Clark Brewster, later announced that the ruling would be appealed. With this turn of events, Medina Spirit became only the third horse in the race's 147-year history to be disqualified after having first having been declared the winner. Subsequently, the former second-place horse Mandaloun was declared the winner.

In December 2024, W.D. Ky federal judge Claria Horn Boom dismissed the class action filed by thirty plaintiffs led by Michael Beychok. Earlier, the United States Court of Appeals for the Sixth Circuit also dismissed similar bettors' lawsuit led by Anthony Mattera on May.

==== Preakness Stakes ====
Medina Spirit's next start was the Preakness Stakes, the second leg in the Triple Crown, run at Pimlico Race Course on May 15. Medina Spirit drew post position 3 and was installed as the 9-5 morning line favorite.

Prior to the draw for the race, Baffert announced he would not travel to the Preakness so as to not be a distraction, adding that he would be represented at Pimlico by his assistant Jimmy Barnes. Baffert also agreed to additional testing protocols for Medina Spirit in the days leading up to the race.

On May 14, 2021, Medina Spirit passed all of the pre-race drug tests administered to him and was given final clearance to run in the Preakness.

After going off as the co-favorite at 5-2, Medina Spirit finished third in the race behind Rombauer and Midnight Bourbon, ending his bid for the Triple Crown.

==== Belmont Stakes ====
On May 17, 2021, Bob Baffert was banned by the New York Racing Association (NYRA) from entering Medina Spirit or any of his other horses in the 2021 Belmont Stakes or any other race at Belmont Park. Baffert later sued the NYRA over his suspension and on July 14 the suspension was reversed by U. S. Federal District Court Judge Carol Bagley Amon sitting in the Eastern District of New York in Brooklyn. The Judge made her ruling based on the NYRA not allowing Baffert a forum to refute their claims and stated that (they the NYRA)..“had held no hearing — let alone a prompt one.”

==== Later three-year-old season ====
Medina Spirit made his next start in the Shared Belief Stakes at Del Mar Racetrack on August 29. He got off to a good start, setting fractions of 22.52, 46.92, 1:11.81 and 1:24.33. In the end he won by 1 1/4 lengths in front of Rock Your World in a time of 1:37.29. Medina Spirit was entered to run in the Grade I Pennsylvania Derby on September 25 but was scratched from the event early on September 23 by Bob Baffert in preference for the Grade I Awesome Again Stakes.

As a side consequence of not flying the horse to the East Coast, Medina Spirit tackled aged horses for the first time on October 2 in the Awesome Again Stakes and led all the way to win comfortably in the end by 5 lengths in a time of 1:49.67 on the fast track. Trainer Baffert responded "It's just a very emotional win for me. He's a great horse and he showed it today."

Medina Spirit's final race of the year was the Breeders' Cup Classic on November 6, where he finished second behind the winner Knicks Go.

== Death ==
Medina Spirit collapsed and died at Santa Anita Park following a five-furlong workout on December 6, 2021. He was three years old. His rider was unhurt. The horse's preliminary cause of death is a heart attack. Medina Spirit's trainer Bob Baffert stated that his barn was "devastated" by the news of Medina Spirit's death, and described the horse as a "member of the family." Medina Spirit's death also came days after Baffert's attorney Craig Robertson publicly acknowledged that the betamethasone detected during the 2021 Kentucky Derby was not regulated by Kentucky state rules, but maintained that it was used to treat Medina Spirit's skin condition and not for performance enhancement. A necropsy conducted by veterinarians and forensic experts at the University of California, Davis showed no evidence of doping, but a definitive cause of death could not be established.

== Statistics ==
Date	Age	Distance	Race	Grade	Track	Odds	Field	Finish	Winning Time	Winning (Losing) Margin	Jockey	Ref
Dec 11, 2020	2	5 1/2 furlongs	Maiden Special Weight		Los Alamitos	3.40	6	1	1:02.93	3 lengths	Abel Cedillo	
Jan 2, 2021	3	1 mile	Sham Stakes	III	Santa Anita	9.40	5	2	1:36.63	(3/4 lengths)	Abel Cedillo	
Jan 30, 2021	3	1 1/16 miles	Robert B. Lewis Stakes	III	Santa Anita	1.00*	6	1	1:36.63	Neck	Abel Cedillo	
Mar 6, 2021	3	1 1/16 miles	San Felipe Stakes	II	Santa Anita	3.30	7	2	1:42.18	(8 lengths)	John Velazquez	
Apr 3, 2021	3	1 1/8 miles	Santa Anita Derby	I	Santa Anita	0.90*	9	2	1:49.17	(4 1/4 lengths)	John Velazquez	
May 1, 2021	3	1 1/4 miles	Kentucky Derby	I	Churchill Downs	12.10	19	1†(DQ)	2:01.02	(1/2 length)	John Velazquez	
May 15, 2021	3	1 3/16 miles	Preakness Stakes	I	Pimlico	1.80*	10	3	1:53.62	(5 1/2 lengths)	John Velazquez	
August 29, 2021	3	1 mile	Shared Belief Stakes	Listed	Del Mar	0.90*	6	1	1:37.29	1 1/4 lengths	John Velazquez	
October 3, 2021	3	1 1/8 miles	Awesome Again Stakes	I	Santa Anita	1.30*	8	1	1:49.67	5 lengths	John Velazquez	
November 6, 2021	3	1 1/4 miles	Breeders' Cup Classic	I	Del Mar	6.80	8	2	1:59.57	(2 3/4 lengths)	John Velazquez	

An asterisk after the odds means Medina Spirit was the post-time favorite.

† Finished first, but disqualified due to a medication violation.

== Pedigree ==
Pedigree of Medina Spirit, dark bay colt, foaled April 5, 2018
Sire Protonico	Giant's Causeway	Storm Cat	Storm Bird
Sire Protonico	Giant's Causeway	Storm Cat	Terlingua
Sire Protonico	Giant's Causeway	Mariah's Storm	Rahy
Sire Protonico	Giant's Causeway	Mariah's Storm	Immense*
Sire Protonico	Alpha Spirit	A.P. Indy	Seattle Slew
Sire Protonico	Alpha Spirit	A.P. Indy	Weekend Surprise
Sire Protonico	Alpha Spirit	Wild Spirit (CHI)	Hussonet
Sire Protonico	Alpha Spirit	Wild Spirit (CHI)	Wild Princess
Dam Mongolian Changa	Brilliant Speed	Dynaformer	Roberto*
Dam Mongolian Changa	Brilliant Speed	Dynaformer	Andover Way
Dam Mongolian Changa	Brilliant Speed	Speed Succeeds	Gone West
Dam Mongolian Changa	Brilliant Speed	Speed Succeeds	Dajin
Dam Mongolian Changa	Bridled	Unbridled	Fappiano
Dam Mongolian Changa	Bridled	Unbridled	Gana Facil
Dam Mongolian Changa	Bridled	Holy Niner	Holy Bull
Dam Mongolian Changa	Bridled	Holy Niner	Scoop the Gold (family 2-n)

* Medina Spirit is inbred 5S x 4D to the stallion Roberto, meaning that he appears in the fifth generation (via Immense) on the sire side and in the fourth generation on the dam side of his pedigree.
