= Known Agenda =

American racehorse

- Sire: Curlin
- Grandsire: Smart Strike
- Dam: Byrama
- Damsire: Byron (GB)
- Sex: Colt
- Foaled: March 22, 2018
- Country: United States
- Color: Chestnut
- Breeder: St. Elias Stables
- Owner: St. Elias Stable
- Trainer: Todd Pletcher
- Record: 8:3-1-1
- Earnings: $641,700

Major wins
- Florida Derby (2021)
- Last updated on June 5, 2021

Known Agenda (foaled March 22, 2018) is a retired American Thoroughbred racehorse who won the 2021 Grade I Florida Derby.

== Background ==
Known Agenda is a chestnut colt who was bred in Kentucky by St. Elias Stables, owned by Vincent Viola. He races for St. Elias Stable as a homebred. Known Agenda was sired by Curlin, who was the two-time American Horse of the Year. Unraced at age two, Curlin became known for his class – the ability to carry his speed over classic distances – with wins including the 2007 Preakness Stakes, 2007 Breeders' Cup Classic and 2008 Dubai World Cup. Since retiring to stud, Curlin has finished in the top ten on the North American sire list several times, including second-place finishes in 2016 and 2019. His most notable progeny, including Exaggerator, Palace Malice, Stellar Wind and Vino Rosso, are also known for their stamina and tendency to develop late. Known Agenda was produced by Byrama, who was bred in England but raced in America, winning the Grade I Vanity Handicap. Known Agenda is her first winner from three foals of racing age.

Known Agenda was offered for sale at the Fasig-Tipton sales as a yearling in August 2019. Bloodstock advisor John Sparkman, who had recommended the breeding, described the colt as "very well-made, correct, [a] beautiful walker." Nevertheless, the colt did not meet his reserve on a final bid of $135,000. Sparkman felt that the colt had been overlooked because his English-bred dam was seen as a turf mare. "Somehow," he said, "I think he looks pretty good on dirt."

Known Agenda was almost offered for sale a second time at Gulfstream Park's two-year-old-in-training sale in March 2020. However, the sale was cancelled just a week before it was scheduled to occur due to the COVID-19 pandemic. He was placed into training with Todd Pletcher, who had previously trained Kentucky Derby winners Always Dreaming, in whom St. Elias Stable was a co-owner, and Super Saver, as well as numerous other champions.

== Racing career ==
=== 2020: Two-Year-Old Season ===
Known Agenda made his debut on September 27, 2020, is a maiden special weight race at Belmont Park over 6 1/2 furlongs. Breaking from post position eight in a field of nine, Known Agenda was carried four wide around the turn while just a few lengths behind the early pace. He could not match the closing move of Highly Motivated, who won by 1 3/4 lengths but finished well clear of the rest of the field in second.

Known Agenda made his next start on November 8 at Aqueduct over a distance of 1 1/8 miles. He and stablemate Overtook went off as the odds-on favorites in a field of nine. Behind a slow early pace, he raced wide around the first turn while rating in fourth place. On the final turn, he started improving his position while maneuvering for racing room closer to the rail. He took the lead near the head of the stretch and held off Greatest Honour in a sustained duel.

Known Agenda made his final start of the year in the Remsen Stakes at Aqueduct on December 5 over a sloppy track. He was bumped at the start then settled into third place a few lengths behind the early pace. He lost all chance though when he bore out in the final turn, racing six wide. He finished a well beaten third, 9 lengths behind the winner.

=== 2021: Three-Year-Old Season ===
Known Agenda made his three-year-old debut on February 6, 2021, in the Sam F. Davis Stakes at Tampa Bay Downs. He settled near the back of the field and was carried wide around the final turn. Still some 13 lengths behind the leaders in midstrech, he finally began to close ground in the final furlong to finish fifth, beaten by 4 1/4 lengths.

For his next start on February 26 in an allowance race at Gulfstream Park, Pletcher decided to add blinkers to help Known Agenda focus. Going off as the 1-2 favorite, he rated behind the early pace then made his move around the final turn. He took the lead at the head of the stretch and continued to open up his advantage, winning by 11 lengths. "We know he's got a lot of talent", said Pletcher. "He's shown it in the mornings and hints of it in the afternoon. We're just trying to get him a little more consistent."

In an attempt to qualify on the 2021 Road to the Kentucky Derby, Pletcher next entered the colt in the Florida Derby on March 27. The favorite for the race was Greatest Honor, who had won the Holy Bull Stakes and Fountain of Youth Stakes after finishing second to Known Agenda at age two. Known Agenda was the third choice in the field at odds of 5-1 based on his allowance race win. He settled in fifth place around the first turn, saving ground close to the rail. He was then angled out on the final turn to move between horses and reached the lead after entering in the stretch. He drifted out slightly in mid stretch, then angled in toward the rail but rolled to an easy 2 3/4 length win. The win qualified Known Agenda for the Kentucky Derby, where he was one of the leading contenders.

"We've always felt distance was not an issue for him. We feel a mile-and-a-quarter is going to be right up his wheelhouse," Pletcher said before the Derby. Known Agenda finished a disappointing ninth to eventual winner Medina Spirit after getting a bad trip.

Hoping to rebound off his disappointing Derby effort, Known Agenda made his next start on June 5 in the Belmont Stakes, where he finished fourth, 13 1/4 lengths behind winner Essential Quality.

It was announced on 25 August that Known Agenda was retired from racing would enter stud at Spendthrift Farm in 2022.

== Statistics ==
Date	Age	Distance	Race	Grade	Track	Odds	Field	Finish	Winning Time	Winning (Losing) Margin	Jockey	Ref
Sep 27, 2020	2	6 1/2 furlongs	Maiden special weight		Belmont Park	6.50	9	2	1:17.82	1 3/4 lengths	John Velazquez	
Nov 8, 2020	2	1 1/8 miles	Maiden special weight		Aqueduct	0.60* (Note: Coupled entry with Overtook)	9	1	1:55.89	head	Kendrick Carmouche	
Dec 5, 2020	2	1 1/8 miles (Note: Sloppy (sealed) track)	Remsen Stakes	II	Aqueduct	1.95	5	3	1:50.60	(9 lengths)	John Velazquez	
Feb 6, 2021	3	1 1/16 miles	Sam F. Davis Stakes	III	Tampa Bay Downs	1.50*	12	5	1:44.30	(4 1/4 lengths)	John Velazquez	
Feb 26, 2021	3	1 1/8 miles	Allowance optional claiming		Gulfstream Park	0.50*	6	1	1:50.47	11 lengths	Irad Ortiz Jr.	
Mar 27, 2021	3	1 1/8 miles	Florida Derby	I	Gulfstream Park	5.40	12	1	1:49.45	2 3/4 lengths	Irad Ortiz Jr.	
May 1, 2021	3	1 1/4 miles	Kentucky Derby	I	Churchill Downs	9.90	19	9	2:01.02	(10 3/4 lengths)	Irad Ortiz Jr.	
Jun 5, 2021	3	1 1/2 miles	Belmont Stakes	I	Belmont Park	6.60	8	4	2:27.11	(13 1/4 lengths)	José Ortiz	

Notes

An asterisk after the odds means Known Agenda was the post-time favorite.

== Pedigree ==
Pedigree of Known Agenda, chestnut colt, foaled March 22, 2018
Sire Curlin	Smart Strike	Mr. Prospector	Raise a Native
Sire Curlin	Smart Strike	Mr. Prospector	Gold Digger
Sire Curlin	Smart Strike	Classy 'n Smart	Smarten
Sire Curlin	Smart Strike	Classy 'n Smart	No Class
Sire Curlin	Sherriff's Deputy	Deputy Minister	Vice Regent
Sire Curlin	Sherriff's Deputy	Deputy Minister	Mint Copy
Sire Curlin	Sherriff's Deputy	Barbarika	Bates Motel
Sire Curlin	Sherriff's Deputy	Barbarika	War Exchange
Dam Byrama (GB)	Byron (GB)	Green Desert	Danzig
Dam Byrama (GB)	Byron (GB)	Green Desert	Foreign Courier
Dam Byrama (GB)	Byron (GB)	Gay Gallanta	Woodman
Dam Byrama (GB)	Byron (GB)	Gay Gallanta	Gallanta (FR)
Dam Byrama (GB)	Aymara (GB)	Darshaan (GB)	Shirley Heights (GB)
Dam Byrama (GB)	Aymara (GB)	Darshaan (GB)	Deisy (FR)
Dam Byrama (GB)	Aymara (GB)	Chipaya (GB)	Northern Prospect
Dam Byrama (GB)	Aymara (GB)	Chipaya (GB)	Flaming Rose (family 9-f)
