= Midnight Bourbon =

American racehorse

- Sire: Tiznow
- Grandsire: Cee's Tizzy
- Dam: Catch The Moon
- Damsire: Malibu Moon
- Sex: Colt
- Foaled: January 25, 2018
- Died: April 17, 2022 (aged 4)
- Country: United States
- Color: dark bay
- Breeder: Stonestreet Farm
- Owner: Winchell Thoroughbreds LLC
- Trainer: Steve Asmussen
- Record: 16: 2-6-5
- Earnings: $3,647,970

Major wins
- Lecomte Stakes (2020)
- Last updated on 22 January 2022

Midnight Bourbon (January 25, 2018 – April 17, 2022) was an American Thoroughbred racehorse who won the 2021 Lecomte Stakes and came second in the 2021 Preakness Stakes and Travers Stakes and 2022 Saudi Cup.

Midnight Bourbon died suddenly from an "acute gastrointestinal situation" on April 17, 2022.

== Background ==
Midnight Bourbon was a dark bay colt born in Kentucky. He was trained by Steve Asmussen and was ridden in his most recent start by jockey Paco Lopez.

According to David Fiske the general manager of the horse's owner Ron Winchell's "Ron Winchell's Thoroughbreds" the horse's name came about as follows ..."It was pretty much a stream-of-consciousness thing” .... “Ron and his buddies do like to try out all the new (bourbon) batches, and he also deals with a lot of liquor distributors. So liquor is in the forefront of his mind a lot, with business and pleasure. So it just came together.” The “Midnight” part of the name can be tied to the dam, Catch the Moon."

== Racing career ==
=== 2020: Two-Year-Old Season ===
Midnight Bourbon came third in his debut, a maiden special weight at Ellis Park on July 22. He broke his maiden in his second start, another maiden special weight at Ellis Park, on August 22.

Stepping up to stakes company, Midnight Bourbon came second in the Iroquois Stakes at Churchill Downs on September 5.

He then came third in the Champagne Stakes at Belmont Park on October 10.

=== 2021: Three-Year-Old Season ===
Midnight Bourbon made his first start as a three-year-old on January 26, winning the Lecomte Stakes at Fair Grounds Racetrack.

He then placed in the next two races on the Derby trail at Fair Grounds, coming in third in the Risen Star Stakes behind Mandaloun and second in the Louisiana Derby behind Hot Rod Charlie. The three races earned him enough points on the 2021 Road to the Kentucky Derby to qualify for the 2021 Kentucky Derby.

Midnight Bourbon made his next start in the 2021 Kentucky Derby and finished sixth after a bad trip.

His next start was in the Preakness Stakes, the second leg of the Triple Crown. He was sent off as the co-favorite with Kentucky Derby winner Medina Spirit at 5–2. Midnight Bourbon got a much better trip than in the Derby, running second most of the race behind Medina Spirit before passing him at the top of the stretch and looking to be the winner. However, Rombauer made a big move on the outside to win, with Midnight Bourbon finishing second.

Midnight Bourbon bypassed the third leg of the Triple Crown, the Belmont Stakes, to have some time off and target the big races in the summer.

He made his next start on July 17 in the Grade 1 Haskell Stakes at Monmouth Park Racetrack. In the stretch, Hot Rod Charlie crossed into his way and impeded his path, which caused Midnight Bourbon to throw his jockey, Paco Lopez. Hot Rod Charlie crossed the finish line first and was disqualified for his interference with Midnight Bourbon. Mandaloun, who had crossed second in a photo finish, was declared the official winner.

Midnight Bourbon came out of the Haskell unhurt and made his next start in the Grade 1 Travers Stakes at Saratoga Racecourse on August 28. He led the race through relaxed early fractions and then was challenged by Essential Quality at the top of the stretch. Midnight Bourbon fought back and was a head behind Essential Quality at the wire.

Midnight Bourbon followed up with a second in the Grade 1 Pennsylvania Derby on September 25 to Hot Rod Charlie. In his last start of the year on 26 November, he finished third as the 6/5 favorite in the Grade 1 Clark Stakes at Churchill Downs to Maxfield.

=== 2022: Four-Year-Old Season ===
Midnight Bourbon made his first start of 2022 in the Louisiana Stakes against his familiar rival Mandaloun, in which he came a close second only 3/4 of a length behind Mandaloun.

Midnight Bourbon prepared to make his next start in the $20 million Saudi Cup where he would face Mandaloun again as well as a quality field of international runners including the previous year's winner Mishriff.

"It's all there. It really is," his trainer Steve Asmussen said. "He has an elite level of talent without finishing it off. It leaves a lot for us moving forward. As accomplished as he is, or as lacking as his résumé is with the wins, he is still in a physical and mental development that I think allows for him to possibly end up being the best horse in training in the world this year. I am hoping beyond hope, and expect, that he's waiting for the Saudi Cup stage to put it all together perfectly."

Midnight Bourbon finished a close third in the race behind Emblem Road and Country Grammer, and jockey Joel Rosario said, "I thought he ran really well. It was probably a little bit different with him, but he showed heart. He did great."

Midnight Bourbon made his next start in the Dubai World Cup, where he finished fifth behind the winner Country Grammer.

Midnight Bourbon suddenly died at Churchill Downs on 17 April 2022 from "acute gastrointestinal" distress, three hours after a five-furlong workout.

== Pedigree ==
Pedigree of Midnight Bourbon, bay colt, foaled January 25, 2018
Sire Tiznow	Cee's Tizzy	Relaunch	In Reality
Sire Tiznow	Cee's Tizzy	Relaunch	Foggy note
Sire Tiznow	Cee's Tizzy	Tizly	Lyphard
Sire Tiznow	Cee's Tizzy	Tizly	Tizna
Sire Tiznow	Cee's Song	Seattle Song	Seattle Slew*
Sire Tiznow	Cee's Song	Seattle Song	Incantation
Sire Tiznow	Cee's Song	Lonely Dancer	Nice Dancer
Sire Tiznow	Cee's Song	Lonely Dancer	Sleep Lonely
Dam Catch the Moon	Malibu Moon	A.P. Indy	Seattle Slew*
Dam Catch the Moon	Malibu Moon	A.P. Indy	Weekend Surprise
Dam Catch the Moon	Malibu Moon	Macoumba	Mr. Prospector
Dam Catch the Moon	Malibu Moon	Macoumba	Maximova
Dam Catch the Moon	Catch My Fancy	Yes It's True	Is It True
Dam Catch the Moon	Catch My Fancy	Yes It's True	Clever Monique
Dam Catch the Moon	Catch My Fancy	Walk Away Rene	Gold Alert
Dam Catch the Moon	Catch My Fancy	Walk Away Rene	Monique Rene

* Midnight Bourbon is inbred 4S × 4D to the stallion Seattle Slew, meaning that he appears fourth generation on the sire side of his pedigree and fourth generation on the dam side of his pedigree.
