= Kendrick Carmouche =

American horse jockey

Horse racing career
- Sport: Horse racing
- Career winnings: $174,368,667 (May 19, 2026)
- Career wins: 4,187 (May 19, 2026)

Honors
- Parx Hall of Fame (2015); George Woolf Memorial Jockey Award (2025)

Significant horses
- Deterministic, True Timber, Pure Sensation

Kendrick Carmouche (born January 18, 1984) is an American thoroughbred racing jockey. In 2025, Carmouche became the 69th jockey to win over 4000 races. That same year, Carmouche was voted to receive the George Woolf Memorial Jockey Award.

== Early life ==
Kendrick Carmouche was born on January 18, 1984 in Vinton, Louisiana. Carmouche comes from a long family line of riders. His father, Sylvester Carmouche Jr., was an accomplished jockey in Louisiana. His brother, Sylvester Carmouche III, also competed professionally. Carmouche's grandfather was a jockey. Before moving to the Philadelphia area, he competed in races with both his father and brother.

Carmouche began riding in Louisiana, before moving his home track to Parx Racing near Philadelphia.

== Career ==
At the age of 16, Carmouche participated in his first race at Delta Downs. Still 16, he earned his first career win at Evangeline Downs on April 27, 2000 while riding Earl n Erin.

In 2001, Carmouche relocated his home track to the Philadelphia area at Parx Casino and Racing. There, he went on to win seven riding titles, including four straight from 2008 to 2011. From 2007 to 2012, he crossed 200 victories in each season. In 2015, he was inducted into the Parx Hall of Fame.

In 2015, Carmouche again relocated, this time to New York. There, he began competing in the New York Racing Association (NYRA) circuit. So far, Carmouche has won four NYRA titles. In 2020, Carmouche won his first title at the 2020 Aqueduct fall meet with a 23–18–14 record. He has also notched wins at the 2022 Aqueduct spring meet with a record of 19–6–8, the 2022 Aqueduct fall meet with 34 wins, and the 2025 Aqueduct spring meet with 21 wins.

In 2018, Carmouche suffered a fractured femur riding at Kentucky Downs.

In December 2020, Carmouche notched his first Grade 1 victory at the 2020 Cigar Mile while riding True Timber.

One of Carmouche's most significant victories took place in April 2021, when he rode the 72–1 long shot Bourbonic to a victory in the Wood Memorial Stakes. His victory secured him a ticket to the 2021 Kentucky Derby, where he crossed the finish line in 13th, placing 12th after the disqualification of Medina Spirit.

In October 2026, Kendrick Carmouche rode Deterministic to win the Breeder's Cup Mile, becoming the first Black jockey to win a Breeders' Cup event

== Personal life ==
Carmouche is married to his wife, Whitney Carmouche. They have two children.
