= 2021 Kentucky Derby =

Horse race

147th Kentucky Derby
- Kentucky Derby
- Grade I stakes race
- "The Run for the Roses"
- Location: Churchill Downs; Louisville, Kentucky, United States
- Date: May 1, 2021
- Distance: 1 1/4 mi (10 furlongs; 2,012 m)
- Winning horse: Mandaloun
- Winning time: 2:01.36
- Final odds: 12–1
- Jockey: Florent Geroux
- Trainer: Brad Cox
- Owner: Juddmonte Farms
- Conditions: Fast
- Surface: Dirt
- Attendance: 51,838

The 2021 Kentucky Derby (officially, the 2021 Kentucky Derby presented by Woodford Reserve) was the 147th running of the Kentucky Derby. It took place on May 1, 2021, in Louisville, Kentucky. The field was open to 20 horses, who qualified for the race by earning points on the 2021 Road to the Kentucky Derby. The Kentucky Derby is a Grade I stakes race for three-year-old Thoroughbreds at a distance of 1 1/4 miles (2.0 km) and has been run at Churchill Downs racetrack since its inception in 1875. The purse for 2021 was US$3 million.

After the 2020 Derby had been postponed to September because of the COVID-19 pandemic and held behind closed doors, the 2021 edition returned to its traditional May schedule and allowed spectators, although in reduced numbers and with social distancing measures in place.

Medina Spirit crossed the finish line first, which appeared to have given his trainer Bob Baffert a record seventh win in the race and jockey John Velazquez his fourth Derby win. However, the horse tested positive for betamethasone after the race. The Kentucky Horse Racing Commission made the final decision to disqualify the horse on February 21, 2022. Because Medina Spirit was disqualified, Mandaloun was named the winner.

The race was broadcast by NBC, with coverage by NBCSN of undercard races beginning at 12:30 pm EDT and main network coverage of pre-race activities starting at 2:30 pm EDT. It was also livestreamed on NBCSports.com. The post time was 7:01 pm.

== Qualification ==
The Kentucky Derby is only open to three-year-old Thoroughbreds, thus entrants in the 2021 race were foaled in 2018, as part of the North American foal crop of 21,181. (Note: Horses from Europe and Japan are also eligible for the race, but proportionally fewer of them are pointed towards the Kentucky Derby.) The field is limited to twenty horses who qualify based on points earned in the 2021 Road to the Kentucky Derby, a series of designated races that was first introduced in 2013. This point system replaced the previous graded stakes race earnings system.

Most positions in the Derby starting gate are earned on the main Road, consisting of 35 races in North America plus one in Dubai. The major preps for the Kentucky Derby are the Louisiana Derby, Jeff Ruby Steaks, UAE Derby, Florida Derby, Wood Memorial, Blue Grass Stakes, Santa Anita Derby, and Arkansas Derby. Each of these races provided the winner with 100 qualifying points, essentially guaranteeing that horse a berth in the Derby provided the owner paid the required nomination and entry fees. The first four of these major preps were run in late March 2021 and were won by Hot Rod Charlie, Like The King, Rebel's Romance, and Known Agenda respectively. The next three major preps were run on April 3, 2021, and were won by Bourbonic, Essential Quality, and Rock Your World. The last major prep was run on April 10 and was won by Super Stock.

One qualification position was also available via the European Road to the Kentucky Derby, and another via the Japan Road. Due in part to ongoing restrictions related to the COVID-19 pandemic, none of these offers were accepted in 2021. These two positions reverted to qualifiers on the main Road.

== Field ==
The favorite for the 2021 Kentucky Derby was Essential Quality, who was undefeated in all five of his previous starts including the Breeders' Cup Juvenile and Blue Grass Stakes. Essential Quality trained at Churchill Downs and had previously won at the track, giving him a home field advantage. His main rivals were the Santa Anita Derby winner Rock Your World, Florida Derby winner Known Agenda, and Louisiana Derby winner Hot Rod Charlie. There were also several highly regarded horses who were runners-up in these events, including Highly Motivated who was second in the Blue Grass, Midnight Bourbon who was second in the Louisiana Derby, and Medina Spirit (the eventual winner), who was second in the Santa Anita Derby. The other major preps were less impressive to handicappers, and the winners of those were relative longshots in the Derby. For example, the 72–1 Wood Memorial winner Bourbonic went off at odds of 28–1.

The post position draw was held at 11:00 a.m. on Tuesday, April 27.

== Race description ==
=== Attendance and broadcasting ===
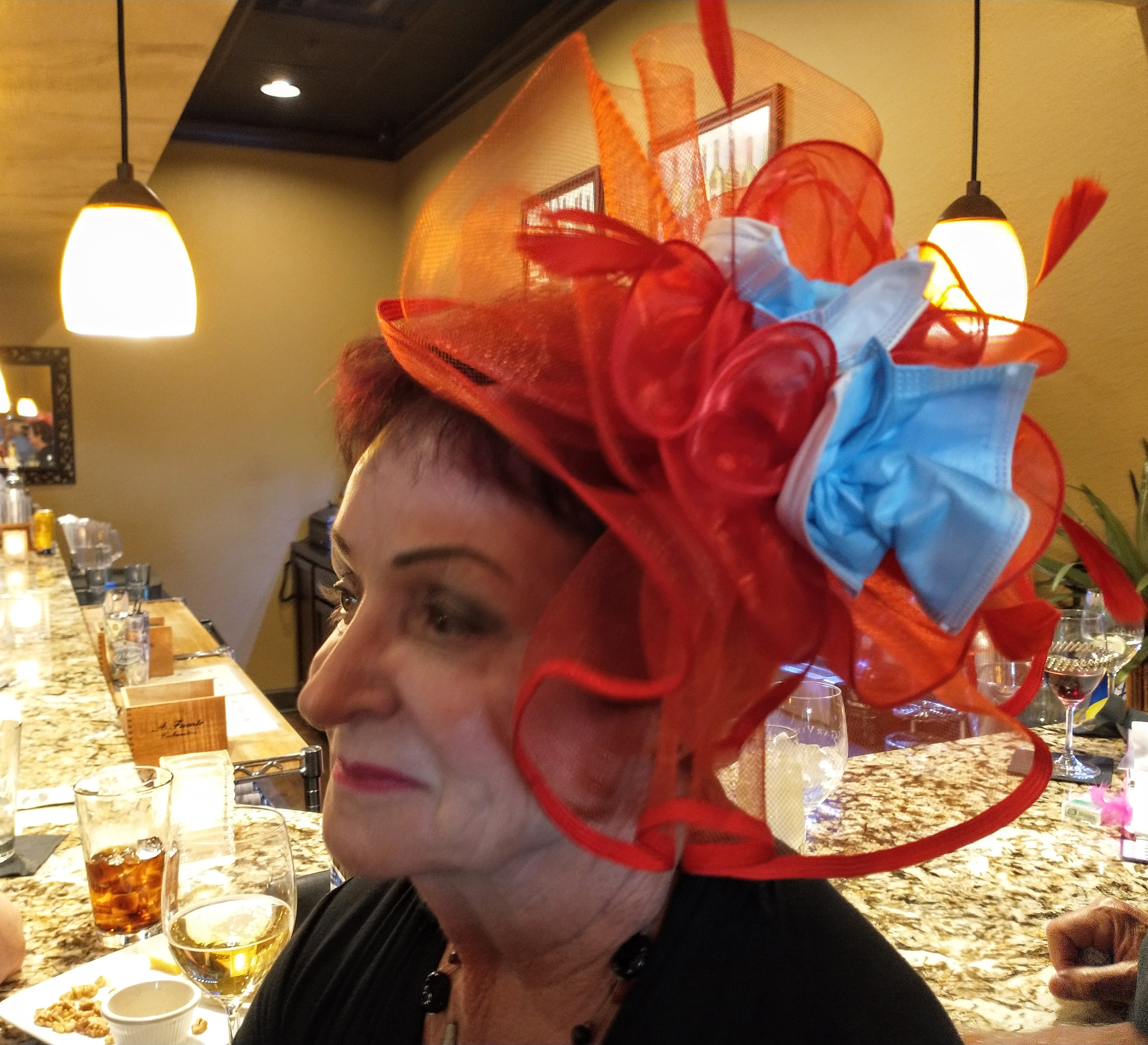
A woman wearing a festive Kentucky Derby hat festooned with COVID-19 face masks.

The 2021 edition of the race returned to the Derby's traditional date on the first Saturday in May, when it had been held for 89 of the last 90 years. Because of the COVID-19 pandemic, the 2020 race was delayed to September and had no paid attendance. The Derby typically has one of the highest audiences of all North American sporting events, in the range of 150,000 in recent years, which includes a large infield crowd. The 2021 had a reduced attendance, with reserved seating limited to about 60% of capacity. About 15,000 general admission tickets to the infield were also sold – roughly 25% to 30% of capacity.

=== Running of the derby ===
In his previous race at Santa Anita, Medina Spirit had rated behind the pace set by Rock Your World and had finished second. For the Derby, jockey John Velazquez decided to change tactics and instead sent Medina Spirit to the early lead with Soup and Sandwich in second. Several horses, including Essential Quality and Rock Your World, bumped at the start and lost position – Rock Your World never recovered while Essential Quality was carried wide around the first turn. Medina Spirit set solid fractions of :46.70 for the half-mile and 1:11.21, after which Soup and Sandwich fell back, eventually finishing last. Mandaloun and Hot Rod Charlie moved into contention as the field completed the mile in 1:35.98, with Mandaloun closing to within a head of Medina Spirit. Essential Quality looked threatening while making a wide move but lost momentum as they turned into the stretch. In a close finish, Medina Spirit held off his rivals to win by half a length over Mandaloun with Hot Rod Charlie just edging Essential Quality for third.

It was a record-breaking seventh Derby win for trainer Bob Baffert, who had earned his first such win in 1997 with Silver Charm. It was the fourth win for jockey Velazquez and the first for Zedan Racing Stables.

Medina Spirit's share of the purse was $1,860,000.

== Aftermath ==
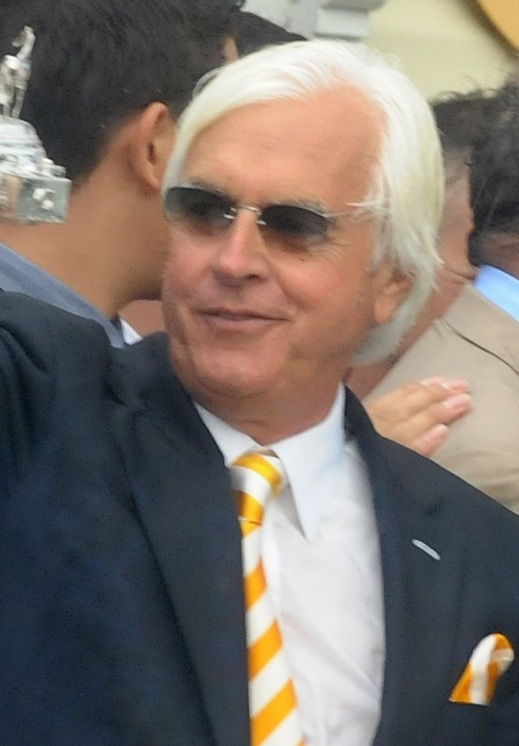
Bob Baffert, the trainer of Medina Spirit, was suspended by Churchill Downs for two years for "reckless practices and substance violations".

One week after the Kentucky Derby was run, Bob Baffert's assistant, Jimmy Barnes, was informed by the Kentucky Horse Racing Commission (KHRC) that post-race testing on Medina Spirit showed 21 pg/mL of betamethasone. In Kentucky, betamethasone is classified as a Class C drug that is permitted for therapeutic use in horses, but requires a 14-day withdrawal time. Any amount of the drug detected in post-race testing is a violation and could result in a disqualification.

In a news conference on May 9, Baffert said that Medina Spirit was never administered betamethasone. In addition to a request for a split drug sample, Baffert requested an independent DNA and follicle test. He told reporters that he would fight the issue "...tooth and nail because I owe it to the horse, I owe it to the owner, and I owe it to our industry." Shortly thereafter, Churchill Downs suspended Baffert from entering any horses at their racetrack pending the outcome of the commission's investigation.

On May 11, Baffert released a statement through his attorney saying that veterinarians treated Medina Spirit with Otomax, an antifungal ointment, from after the horse's second-place finish in the Santa Anita Derby until the day before the Kentucky Derby. Baffert claimed that Otomax was used to treat dermatitis on the horse's hind end, and that he did not realize the ointment had betamethasone until after the positive test was reported. Baffert said he never attempted to "game the system or get an unfair advantage", and quoted pharmacologists who told him that "21 picograms of betamethasone would have no effect on the outcome of the race."

On June 2, Churchill Downs announced that the split sample had also tested positive. Churchill Downs announced that it had suspended Baffert for two years as a result of this and earlier positive tests at other racetracks. Bill Carstanjen stated for Churchill Downs that "given these repeated failures over the last year, including the increasingly extraordinary explanations, we firmly believe that asserting our rights to impose these measures is our duty and responsibility."

On December 6, Medina Spirit died following a workout. At the time of his death, Medina Spirit was still an active racehorse, even recently winning the October 2021 Awesome Again Stakes and then afterwards finishing second in the November 2021 Breeder's Cup Classic. Three days before the horse's death, Baffert's attorney Craig Robinson publicly acknowledged that the kind of betamethasone which Medina Spirit was injected with was banned by Kentucky state rules, while also alleging it was used to improve his skin condition rather than enhance performance.

The Kentucky Horse Racing Commission made its final decision to disqualify the horse on February 21, 2022, with an official statement. Because Medina Spirit was disqualified, Mandaloun was named the winner. Baffert had the right to appeal the ruling per the Kentucky Horse Racing Commission rules, which he did along with Amr F. Zedan, the owner of Medina Spirit. His appeal was later dismissed on April 18, 2022.

Medina Spirit's disqualification for betamethasone is the first drug-related disqualification of a Kentucky Derby winner since Dancer's Image was disqualified for phenylbutazone, a nonsteroidal anti-inflammatory drug (NSAID), following the 1968 edition. It would be the second disqualification in three years (Maximum Security was disqualified in 2019 due to interference), and the third disqualification in the 147-year history of the race.

In December 2024, W.D. Ky federal judge Claria Horn Boom dismissed the class action filed by thirty plaintiffs led by Michael Beychok. Earlier, the United States Court of Appeals for the Sixth Circuit also dismissed similar bettors' lawsuit led by Anthony Mattera on May.

== Results ==
Finish	Program Numbers (Note: With the scratch of No. 16 King Fury, horses with higher program numbers started one position closer to the rail. For example, No. 17 Highly Motivated started from post position 16.)	Horse	Qualifying Points	Trainer	Jockey	Morning Line Odds	Final Odds	Margin (Lengths) (Note: Note that the margins were measured from Medina Spirit, as was the winning time)	Winnings
1	7	Mandaloun (winner)	52	Brad Cox	Florent Geroux	12–1	26.90	1/2 length	$1,860,000
2	9	Hot Rod Charlie (place)	110	Doug O'Neill	Flavien Prat	8–1	5.60	1 length	$600,000
3	14	Essential Quality (show)	140	Brad Cox	Luis Saez	2–1	2.90*	1 length	$300,000
4	6	O Besos	25	Greg Foley	Marcelino Pedroza	20–1	41.70	5 1/2 lengths	$150,000
5	10	Midnight Bourbon	66	Steve Asmussen	Mike Smith	20–1	13.20	8 1/4 lengths	$90,000
6	4	Keepmeinmind	18	Robertino Diodoro	David Cohen	20–1	49.00	8 1/2 lengths	
7	12	Helium	50	Mark Casse	Julien Leparoux	50–1	38.10	10 1/2 lengths	
8	1	Known Agenda	102	Todd Pletcher	Irad Ortiz Jr.	6–1	9.90	10 3/4 lengths	
9	17	Highly Motivated	50	Chad Brown	Javier Castellano	10–1	10.70	11 lengths	
10	5	Sainthood	40	Todd Pletcher	Corey Lanerie	50–1	43.40	12 3/4 lengths	
11	2	Like the King	104	Wesley Ward	Drayden Van Dyke	50–1	49.90	12 3/4 lengths	
12	20	Bourbonic	100	Todd Pletcher	Kendrick Carmouche	30–1	30.40	16 lengths	
13	13	Hidden Stash	32	Vicki Oliver	Rafael Bejarano	50–1	39.40	16 3/4 lengths	
14	3	Brooklyn Strong	10	Daniel Velazquez	Umberto Rispoli	30–1	43.50	18 1/4 lengths	
15	18	Super Stock	109	Steve Asmussen	Ricardo Santana Jr.	30–1	33.90	19 3/4 lengths	
16	15	Rock Your World	100	John Sadler	Joel Rosario	5–1	4.70	24 1/4 lengths	
17	11	Dynamic One	40	Todd Pletcher	Jose Ortiz	20–1	45.30	32 1/4 lengths	
18	19	Soup and Sandwich	40	Mark Casse	Tyler Gaffalione	30–1	26.90	65 1/4 lengths	
DNS	16	King Fury	20	Kenneth McPeek	Brian Hernandez Jr.	20–1	Scratched (Note: King Fury was scratched when he was diagnosed with a fever.)	Scratched (fever)	
DQ	8	Medina Spirit	74	Bob Baffert	John Velazquez	15–1	12.10	Disqualified (drugs)	

Track condition: fast

Times: 1/4 mile – 23.09; 1/2 mile – 46.70; 3/4 mile – 1:11.21; mile – 1:35.98; final – 2:01.02.
Splits for each quarter-mile: (23.09) (23.61) (24.51) (24.77) (25.04)

Source: Equibase chart

=== Payouts ===
The table below shows the payout schedule for the 2021 Kentucky Derby. NOTE: In accordance to Ruling 22-0009 by the Kentucky Horse Racing Commission on February 21, 2022 that changed the results of the Kentucky Derby, "Pari-mutuel wagering is not affected by this ruling." All bets are based on the official results at the end of the race, not on post-race drug testing.

Program number	Horse name	Win	Place	Show
8	Medina Spirit	$26.20	$12.00	$7.60
7	Mandaloun	—	$23.00	$13.40
9	Hot Rod Charlie	—	—	$5.20

- $2 exacta: $503.60
- $0.50 trifecta: $848.45
- $1 superfecta: $9,456.40
- $1 Super High Five: $296,769.60

== See also ==
- Equine drug testing
