= Luis Saez =

American-Panamanian jockey

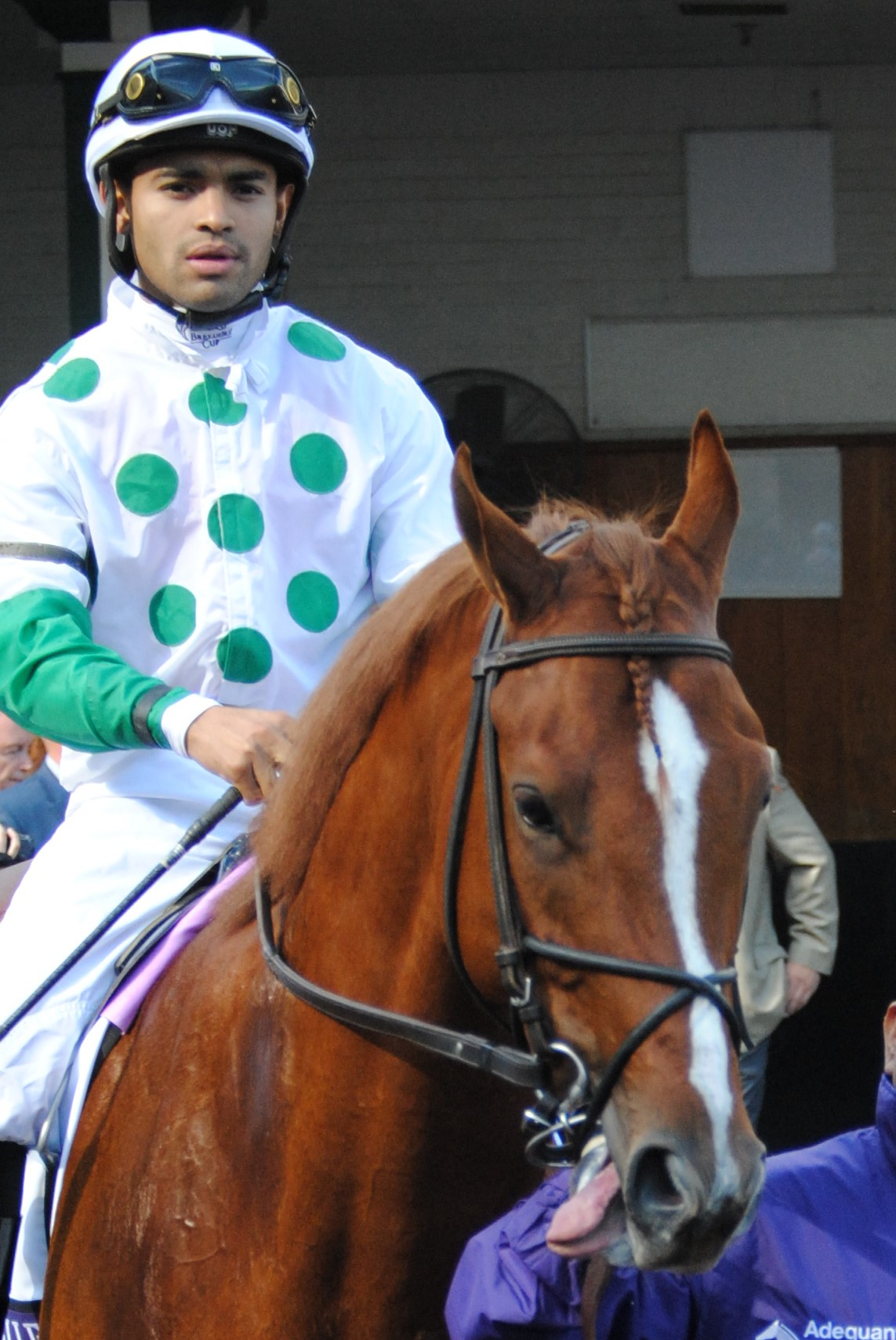
- Luis Saez at the 2018 Breeders' Cup

Personal information
- Born: May 19, 1992 (age 34) Panama City, Panama
- Occupation: Jockey

Horse racing career
- Sport: Horse racing
- Career wins: 4,001+ (ongoing)

Major racing wins
- Haskell Stakes (2019, 2024); Fountain of Youth Stakes (2014, 2015, 2024); Travers Stakes (2013, 2021); Clark Handicap (2013); Diana Stakes (2014); Shadwell Turf Mile Stakes (2015); Blue Grass Stakes (2016); Test Stakes (2016); Hopeful Stakes (2017); Arkansas Derby (2018); H. Allen Jerkens Memorial Stakes (2018); Man o' War Stakes (2018); Florida Derby (2019); Cigar Mile Handicap (2019, 2021); Woody Stephens Stakes (2020); Ballerina Stakes (2020); Spinaway Stakes (2020); Fourstardave Handicap (2020); Spinster Stakes (2020); Breeders' Futurity (2020); Woodward Handicap (2020); Churchill Downs Stakes (2021); Bruce D. Stakes (2021); Kentucky Oaks (2022, 2025); Jaipur Stakes (2022); American Classics / Breeders' Cup: Breeders' Cup Juvenile (2020); Belmont Stakes (2021, 2024); International races: Dubai World Cup (2021)

Significant horses
- Essential Quality, Dornoch, Good Cheer, Maximum Security, Mystic Guide, Will Take Charge
- Updated on August 23, 2026

Luis Saez (born May 19, 1992) is a Panamanian jockey in American Thoroughbred horse racing. Saez rode Maximum Security to finish first in the 2019 Kentucky Derby but was subsequently disqualified due to interference. The two later won the world's richest race, the $20,000,000 Saudi Cup, in 2020. Saez won his first Breeders' Cup race in 2020 and first American Classic in 2021, both with champion Essential Quality.

== Background ==
Saez was born on May 19, 1992, in Panama City, Panama. He trained to be a jockey at the Laffit Pincay Jr. Jockey Training Academy in Panama. He rode 37 winners in Panama before relocating to the United States. His younger brother, Juan, also became a jockey but died in a riding accident at Indiana Grand in 2014. Saez dedicated his win in the 2021 Belmont Stakes to his brother.

Saez rides predominantly on the New York racing circuit and calls Belmont Park his second home. His height is 62 inches (160 cm) and his riding weight is 111 pounds (50 kg).

== Career ==
Saez earned his first win in the United States on August 20, 2009, aboard Fearless Honor at Calder Race Track. His first stakes win was in 2009 in the Needles Stakes at Calder with Cinnamon Road. His first graded stakes win was in 2010 with Twilight Meteor in the Tropical Park Handicap, again at Calder.

In 2013, Saez scored his first Grade I win aboard Will Take Charge in the Travers Stakes. The two also won the Pennsylvania Derby and Clark Handicap, and finished second in the 2013 Breeders' Cup Classic. Will Take Charge earned the Eclipse Award as that year's Champion three-year-old colt.

Saez tied a Gulfstream Park record on January 24, 2018, when he rode seven winners on a single card. On November 9, 2018, he recorded his 2,000th win when he won the fourth race at Aqueduct on Y'allcomenow.

In 2019, Saez partnered with Maximum Security to wins in the Florida Derby, Haskell Invitational and Clark Handicap. These wins were overshadowed however by a controversial disqualification in the Kentucky Derby when Maximum Security swerved as the field turned for home with the colt on the lead. Saez said the horse had reacted to noise from the infield crowd, but was immediately brought under control. However, the swerve affected several horses behind him and could have caused a major accident if he had clipped heels with another horse. Saez was subsequently suspended for 15 days for "failure to control his mount". The two later won the world's richest race, the $20,000,000 Saudi Cup, in 2020, although the horse was subsequently disqualified by racing officials in Saudi Arabia following the conviction of trainer Jason Servis in the United States on charges related to equine doping.

In 2020, Saez partnered with Essential Quality to win in the Breeders' Futurity and Breeders' Cup Juvenile, earning Saez his first win at the Breeders' Cup and the colt the Eclipse Award for champion two-year-old colt. In 2021, the two teamed up to win the Blue Grass and Belmont Stakes, the latter being Saez's first win of an American Triple Crown race.

In 2024, Saez partnered with Dornoch in his second Belmont Stakes win after winning on top of Essential Quality in 2021. The upset victory was a vindication after a 10th-place finish in the 2024 Kentucky Derby after Mystik Dan, the Kentucky Derby winner, beat him to the rail position.

On August 22, 2026, Saez won his 4,000th career race in North America at Saratoga Race Course.

== Ranking ==
North American Rank	by earnings	by number of wins
2009	172	
2010	58	19
2011	34	13
2012	36	5
2013	9	36
2014	17	64
2015	7	16
2016	9	14
2017	8	7
2018	8	8
2019	7	4
2020	3	3
2021	3	3
