= Essential Quality =

American racehorse

- Sire: Tapit
- Grandsire: Pulpit
- Dam: Delightful Quality
- Damsire: Elusive Quality
- Sex: Stallion
- Foaled: 2018
- Country: United States
- Color: Gray
- Breeder: Godolphin Stables
- Owner: Godolphin Stables
- Trainer: Brad H. Cox
- Record: 10: 8–0–2
- Earnings: $4,215,144

Major wins
- Breeders' Futurity Stakes (2020); Southwest Stakes (2021); Blue Grass Stakes (2021); Jim Dandy Stakes (2021); Travers Stakes (2021) Triple Crown wins: Belmont Stakes (2021) Breeders' Cup wins: Breeders' Cup Juvenile (2020)

Awards
- American Champion Two-Year-Old Male Horse (2020); American Champion Three-Year-Old Male Horse (2021)
- Last updated on 10 February 2022

Essential Quality (foaled April 9, 2018) is a champion American Thoroughbred racehorse who won the 2021 Belmont Stakes, the 2021 Travers Stakes, and the 2020 Breeders' Cup Juvenile. He was named the 2020 Champion Two-Year-Old and the 2021 Champion Three-Year-Old.

He won eight of his ten races, finishing in the top three in every race, with his only defeats being a third in the Kentucky Derby after a troubled trip while finishing a length behind the winner and a third in the Breeders' Cup Classic.

== Background ==
Essential Quality is a gray stallion who was bred in Kentucky by Godolphin Stables, for which he races as a homebred. He is by leading sire Tapit, whose earlier crops had included five Breeders' Cup winners (Stardom Bound, Tapizar, Tapitsfly, Hansen, and Untapable), and three Belmont Stakes winners (Tonalist, Creator, and Tapwrit). He is the second foal and first winner produced by Delightful Quality, a daughter of Elusive Quality and half-sister to champion filly Folklore. The family traces back to influential broodmare La Troienne through the branch created by Stolen Base, which also includes Japanese Triple Crown winner Contrail.

Essential Quality is trained by Brad Cox.

== Racing career ==
=== 2020: Two-Year-Old Season ===
Essential Quality made his first start on September 5 in a six-furlong Maiden Special Weight race at Churchill Downs. He settled in the middle of the pack behind a fast early pace set by Copa. He improved position around the turn but ran into traffic at the head of the stretch. Angled to the outside, he found racing room and closed to win by three lengths. The performance earned the colt "TDN Rising Star" status from the Thoroughbred Daily News.

For his next start, Cox stepped him up in class in the Grade I Breeders' Futurity Stakes at Keeneland on October 3. Despite his lack of experience, Essential Quality was made the 2–1 favorite in the field of nine. He rated just off the early pace set by Upstriker, then took the lead rounding the final turn. He drew away down the stretch to beat the late-closing Keepmeinmind by 3 1/4 lengths. Cox credited new jockey Luis Saez with getting the colt to relax. "He's a very green horse," said Cox. "That was my concern today, could he put it all together? And he did... If he can figure it out, he's a serious animal."

His win in the Breeders' Futurity gave Essential Quality an automatic entry in the Breeders' Cup Juvenile, held on November 6 at Keeneland. In a field of 14, Essential Quality went off as the 7–2-second choice behind the undefeated Jackie's Warrior, winner of the Saratoga Special Stakes, Hopeful Stakes, and Champagne Stakes. Essential Quality broke poorly and bumped into Keepmeinmind to his outside, then settled into midpack. Jackie's Warrior pressed a fast early pace set by Dreamer's Disease, then took the lead turning to the stretch. He was joined by longshot Hot Rod Charlie, who briefly took the lead. Meanwhile, Essential Quality made a wide move on the final turn and slowly gained ground. With a furlong remaining, he switched leads and produced a closing burst to win by three-quarters of a length over Hot Rod Charlie, with Keepmeinmind closing for third and Jackie's Warrior hanging on for fourth.

"I had a perfect trip, a beautiful trip," said Saez. "I knew there was going to be a lot of speed so we were in the right spot. At the three-eighths [pole], he gave me that kick so I knew we had a chance to win the race. He can run all day."

"It's so exciting to win any Breeders' Cup race, but when you have a 2-year-old colt that is a homebred... it's the cherry on top," said Jimmy Bell, the president of Godolphin's U.S. operations. "So much of the farm staff was able to come over and watch because this is in our own backyard. That's where the joy is: in celebrating with people who put so much time in behind the scenes of all this. It made it so special to have the team here, and it's a tribute to Sheikh Mohammed and his overall breeding plan."

After his undefeated season, Essential Quality was named the American champion two-year-old colt of 2020. He became one of the early favorites for the 2021 Kentucky Derby in future wager pools.

=== 2021: Three-Year-Old Season ===
Essential Quality made his three-year-old debut on February 27 in the Southwest Stakes at Oaklawn Park. The race had originally been scheduled for the middle of the month but had been delayed because of extreme weather. Essential Quality went off as the 9–10 favorite ahead of Jackie's Warrior in a seven horse field. Over a sloppy track, Jackie's Warrior went to the early lead while Essential Quality rated a few lengths behind at the outside the pack. Moving four-wide around the final turn, Essential Quality kicked to the lead and drew off to win by 4 1/4 lengths over Spielberg, with Jackie's Warrior in third. After the race, Essential Quality ranked third on the leaderboard for the 2021 Road to the Kentucky Derby.

Essential Quality ran next in the Blue Grass Stakes at Keeneland on April 3, where he went off as the 1–2 favorite in a field of nine that was "short on pace", meaning there were no horses that preferred to run from the front. Essential Quality broke poorly, then settled just behind and to the outside Highly Motivated, who took the lead and set moderate fractions. The two horses remained a half length apart for much of the race, until Essential Quality finally began to gain ground in deep stretch to win by a neck. "That other horse was fighting, and I thought we weren't going to get him," said Saez. "But I always had faith in Essential Quality. He's a nice horse. No matter how fast or slow the pace, he always wants to be first at the wire." Cox felt the race would set up both horses perfectly for the 2021 Kentucky Derby.

==== Kentucky Derby ====
Essential Quality was the favorite for the 2021 Kentucky Derby on May 1, going off at odds of 2–1. At the start of the race, he bumped several times with Rock Your World, costing him early position. He was carried wide around the first turn, and again made a wide move on the far turn. He seemed to lose momentum as they turned into the stretch but closed late to finish third in a blanket finish behind Mandaloun and Hot Rod Charlie.

==== Belmont Stakes ====
Essential Quality bypassed the Preakness Stakes, and made his next start in the 2021 Belmont Stakes, the final leg of the American Triple Crown. He went off as the 6–5 favorite in a field that included Preakness winner Rombauer and several of the leading contenders from the Kentucky Derby, although Medina Spirit had been banned from entering by the New York Racing Association due to a positive drug test. Hot Rod Charlie went to the early lead, pressed by Rock Your World, and set the fastest fraction for the first quarter-mile (:22.79) in Belmont Stakes history. He then slowed down the pace, completing the half in :46.49 and the three-quarters in 1:12.07. Essential Quality was originally farther back than normal but began to improve his position down the backstretch. As they rounded the far turn, Essential Quality moved up alongside Hot Rod Charlie. They drew off from the rest of the field in a sustained stretch duel, with Essential Quality pulling away at the end to win by 1 1/4 lengths. It was another 11 lengths back to Rombauer in third place. The final time was a solid 2:27.11.

"I had a lot of horse," said Saez, "and the good thing about Essential (Quality) is that he always fights. He doesn't care who it is; he's going to want to beat them. So I knew he was going to show up at the top of the stretch."

==== Jim Dandy Stakes ====
Essential Quality was given a brief layoff, then returned in the Grade II Jim Dandy Stakes at Saratoga Racecourse on July 31, a local prep for the Travers Stakes. He started as the 2–5 favorite in a field of five. Breaking from the outside post, he was carried wide around the first turn while tracking the pace set by Dr. Jack and Masquerpade. He was floated even wider around the final turn as he made his move to pass the tiring early leaders. Meanwhile, Keepmeinmind made a move on the inside. The two horses battled down the stretch with Essential Quality winning by half a length. The final time was 1:49.92 for the 1 1/9 miles. "It's always easy to just gallop around there in a fast time", said Cox, "but there was a lot of ground-loss today. He obviously had to work to win. He got something out of it."

The win moved Essential Quality to the number three position, and the highest ranked three-year-old, in the NTRA Top Thoroughbred poll of horses in training in North America.

==== Travers Stakes ====
Essential Quality made his next start in the Travers Stakes at Saratoga on August 28 where he was again the heavy favorite in a field of seven. His main rival was Midnight Bourbon, who went to the lead and set comfortable fractions of 24.18 seconds for the first quarter-mile and 48.96 for the half. Essential Quality bobbled at the start then moved to the rail in second place until they rounded the final turn. He then switched to the outside Midnight Bourbon and gradually pulled to the lead by midstretch. Midnight Bourbon tried to rally and the two colts drew away from the rest of the field. Essential Quality won by a neck in a time of 2:01.96, with the final quarter run in a very fast 23.15 seconds.

Cox commended jockey Luis Saez for ensuring the colt didn't lose ground as he had in the Jim Dandy, and for recognizing the need to stay close to Midnight Bourbon. Saez said, "That was the plan, but I always feel like I have so much horse that I can make my move and get going. He gets past the horse and he can stay there, he don't waste energy."

==== Breeders' Cup Classic ====
Essential Quality made the final race of his career, where he started the 19–10 favorite in the Breeders' Cup Classic at Del Mar Racetrack against older horses on November 6, where he finished third to Knicks Go.

== Retirement and stud career ==
After the Breeders' Cup Classic, Essential Quality was retired to stand at stud at Darley's Jonabell Farm.

In February 2022 he was announced the 2021 American Champion Three-Year-Old Male at the Eclipse Awards ceremony.

His stud fee for the 2025 breeding season is $50,000.

=== Notable progeny ===
c = colt, f = filly, g = gelding

| Foaled | Name | Sex | Major Wins |
| 2023 | The Puma | c | Pennsylvania Derby (2026) |

== Statistics ==
| Date | Age | Distance | Race | Grade | Track | Odds | Field | Finish | Winning Time | Winning (Losing) Margin | Jockey | Ref |
|---|---|---|---|---|---|---|---|---|---|---|---|---|
| Sep 5, 2020 | 2 | 6 furlongs | Maiden Special Weight | | Churchill Downs | 1.90* | 11 | 1 | 1:09.98 | 4 lengths | Shaun Bridgmohan | |
| Oct 3, 2020 | 2 | 1 1/16 miles | Breeders' Futurity Stakes | I | Keeneland | 1.90* | 9 | 1 | 1:44.37 | 3 1/4 lengths | Luis Saez | |
| Nov 6, 2020 | 2 | 1 1/16 miles | Breeders' Cup Juvenile | I | Keeneland | 3.70 | 14 | 1 | 1:42.09 | 3/4 lengths | Luis Saez | |
| Feb 27, 2021 | 3 | 1 1/16 miles | Southwest Stakes | III | Oaklawn Park | 0.90* | 7 | 1 | 1:45.48 | 4 1/4 lengths | Luis Saez | |
| Apr 3, 2021 | 3 | 1 1/8 miles | Blue Grass Stakes | II | Keeneland | 0.50* | 9 | 1 | 1:48.50 | neck | Luis Saez | |
| May 1, 2021 | 3 | 1 1/4 miles | Kentucky Derby | I | Churchill Downs | 2.90* | 19 | 4 | 2:01.02 | (1 length) | Luis Saez | |
| Jun 5, 2021 | 3 | 1 1/2 miles | Belmont Stakes | I | Belmont Park | 1.30* | 8 | 1 | 2:27.11 | 1 1/4 lengths | Luis Saez | |
| Jul 31, 2021 | 3 | 1 1/8 miles | Jim Dandy Stakes | II | Saratoga | 0.40* | 5 | 1 | 1:49.92 | 1/2 length | Luis Saez | |
| Aug 28, 2021 | 3 | 1 1/4 miles | Travers Stakes | I | Saratoga | 0.45* | 7 | 1 | 2:01.96 | neck | Luis Saez | |
| Nov 6, 2021 | 3 | 1 1/4 miles | Breeders' Cup Classic | I | Del Mar | 1.90* | 8 | 3 | 1:59.57 | (3 1/2 lengths) | Luis Saez | |

An asterisk after the odds means Essential Quality was the post-time favorite

== Pedigree ==
Pedigree of Essential Quality, gray colt, April 9, 2018
| Sire Tapit | Pulpit | A.P. Indy | Seattle Slew |
| Sire Tapit | Pulpit | A.P. Indy | Weekend Surprise |
| Sire Tapit | Pulpit | Preach | Mr Prospector* |
| Sire Tapit | Pulpit | Preach | Narrate |
| Sire Tapit | Tap Your Heels | Unbridled | Fappiano*^ |
| Sire Tapit | Tap Your Heels | Unbridled | Gana Facil |
| Sire Tapit | Tap Your Heels | Ruby Slippers | Nijinsky |
| Sire Tapit | Tap Your Heels | Ruby Slippers | Moon Glitter |
| Dam Delightful Quality | Elusive Quality | Gone West | Mr Prospector* |
| Dam Delightful Quality | Elusive Quality | Gone West | Secrettame |
| Dam Delightful Quality | Elusive Quality | Touch of Greatness | Hero's Honor |
| Dam Delightful Quality | Elusive Quality | Touch of Greatness | Ivory Wand |
| Dam Delightful Quality | Contrive | Storm Cat | Storm Bird |
| Dam Delightful Quality | Contrive | Storm Cat | Terlingua |
| Dam Delightful Quality | Contrive | Jeano | Fappiano*^ |
| Dam Delightful Quality | Contrive | Jeano | Basie (family 1-x) |

*^ Essential Quality is inbred 4S x 5S x 4D x 5D to the stallion Mr Prospector, meaning that he appears fourth and fifth generation (via Fappiano)^ on the sire side of his pedigree and fourth and fifth generation (via Fappiano)^ on the dam side of his pedigree.
