= Brad H. Cox =

American racehorse trainer

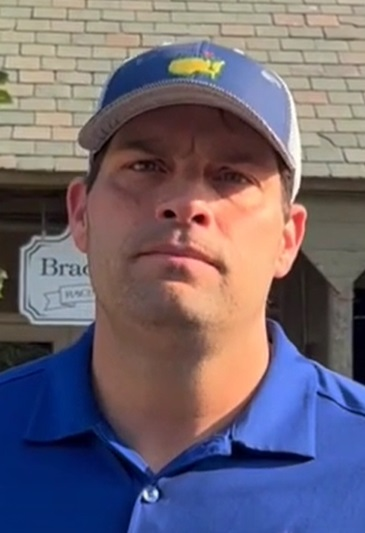
- Cox in 2023

Personal information
- Born: March 30, 1980 (age 46) Louisville, Kentucky
- Occupation: Trainer

Horse racing career
- Sport: Horse racing
- Career wins: 3,000+ (ongoing)

Major racing wins
- Ashland Stakes (2018); Kentucky Oaks (2018, 2020, 2025); Acorn Stakes (2018, 2022); Arkansas Derby(2022, 2023); Beholder Mile Stakes (2023); Champagne Stakes (2023); Clement L. Hirsch Stakes (2021); Coaching Club American Oaks (2018, 2023); Highlander Stakes (2017, 2018); Clark Handicap (2018); Alcibiades Stakes (2019, 2021); Joe Hirsch Turf Classic (2019); Breeders' Futurity (2020); La Troienne Stakes (2020, 2021); Pegasus World Cup (2021); Blue Grass Stakes (2021, 2026); Travers Stakes (2021); Arlington Million (2023); St. Louis Derby (2023, 2025); Florida Derby (2025, 2026); Dubai World Cup (2025) U.S. Triple Crown wins: Kentucky Derby (2021); Belmont Stakes (2021); Breeders' Cup wins: Breeders' Cup Distaff (2018, 2020); Breeders' Cup Juvenile Fillies (2019, 2024); Breeders' Cup Filly & Mare Sprint (2019); Breeders' Cup Dirt Mile (2020); Breeders' Cup Juvenile Fillies Turf (2020); Breeders' Cup Juvenile (2020); Breeders' Cup Classic (2021); Breeders' Cup Turf Sprint (2022); Breeders' Cup Dirt Mile (2026)

Racing awards
- Eclipse Award for Outstanding Trainer (2020, 2021)

Significant horses
- Monomoy Girl, British Idiom, Covfefe, Essential Quality, Immersive, Knicks Go, Caravel, Shedaresthedevil

Brad H. Cox (born March 30, 1980) is a Thoroughbred racehorse trainer whose most notable horses include multiple Eclipse Award winner Monomoy Girl, Knicks Go, Covfefe, Mandaloun, and Essential Quality. He had four winners at the 2020 Breeders' Cup, helping Cox earn the Eclipse Award for Outstanding Trainer that year. In 2021, he won that title again after Essential Quality won the Belmont Stakes and Knicks Go won the Breeders' Cup Classic; Mandaloun would later be awarded that year's Kentucky Derby.

== Background ==
Cox was born in Louisville, Kentucky on March 30, 1980, the son of Jerry and Mary Cox. He grew up just two blocks away from Churchill Downs and his father began taking him to the track when he was four or five. Cox began studying the Daily Racing Form when he was twelve. "I felt I knew a lot about what it meant. I was intrigued by the trainers, the jockeys, the past performances themselves."

He attended Iroquois High School and got his first job as a hot walker at thirteen, then worked as a groom for trainers Burt Kessinger and Jimmy Baker. He was then an assistant trainer to Dallas Stewart for five years before starting his own stable at age 24.

He is currently married to Livia Frazar, a racetrack veterinarian, who met him in 2011. The two have a son Brodie. Two sons from his first marriage, Blake and Bryson, work with him as assistants/barn foremen.

== Racing career ==
Cox earned his first career win on December 4, 2004, with One Lucky Storm at Turfway Park. In 2005, Tappin for Gold gave him his first stakes win. He had fairly limited success in the following years, mainly in the claiming ranks, and his stable shrank at one point to just two or three horses. However, he slowly built up his client base, which came to include members of the Dubai royal family such as Godolphin, Juddmonte Farms and Spendthrift Farm. "It was an amazing roller-coaster ride to get to the point we are now," said Cox in January 2021. "It's still a roller-coaster ride, but we have the numbers that we’re able to keep things going."

Cox earned his first graded stakes win in 2014 with Carve in the Prairie Meadows Cornhusker Handicap. He noted that his early graded stakes winners were from the claiming ranks. "We had to develop them or improve them," he said, "whether it was surface change or something along the way that got them in good form. That's how it really got kicked off, our ability to show we could win at the graded-stakes level. I think that's when the larger outfits, people with homebreds with nice pedigrees, start calling you and you get horses out of the sale as well."

Cox's reputation as an elite trainer began when Monomoy Girl joined his stable in 2017. She gave Cox his first Grade I win in the Ashland Stakes at Keeneland in 2018 and then became his first Eclipse Award winner after winning the Kentucky Oaks, Acorn Stakes, Coaching Club American Oaks and Breeders' Cup Distaff. Cox recorded his 1,000th win on November 18, 2018, with Play On at Fair Grounds.

In 2019, Cox trained two more Eclipse Award winners, Covfefe and British Idiom, whose campaigns were highlighted by wins in the Breeders' Cup Filly & Mare Sprint and Juvenile Fillies respectively. Those wins temporarily increased Cox to fourth place on the 2019 list of leading trainers by money earned. He finished the year ranked fifth by earnings and fourth by number of wins.

After missing her 2019 campaign due to illness, Monomoy Girl returned in 2020 to win another Eclipse Award. Cox was the leading trainer at Keeneland's 2020 Fall Meet, then had a record-tying four winners at the 2020 Breeders' Cup: Monomoy Girl in the Distaff, Essential Quality in the Juvenile, Knicks Go in the Dirt Mile and Aunt Pearl in the Juvenile Fillies Turf. Cox was voted the Eclipse Award for Outstanding Trainer of 2020 and again in 2021.

In 2021, Cox trained two Triple Crown race winners, Kentucky Derby winner Mandaloun and Belmont Stakes winner Essential Quality, and American Horse of the Year Knicks Go, who won five of his seven starts on the year including the Breeders' Cup Classic.
