= Michael W. McCarthy =

American racehorse trainer

Michael McCarthy
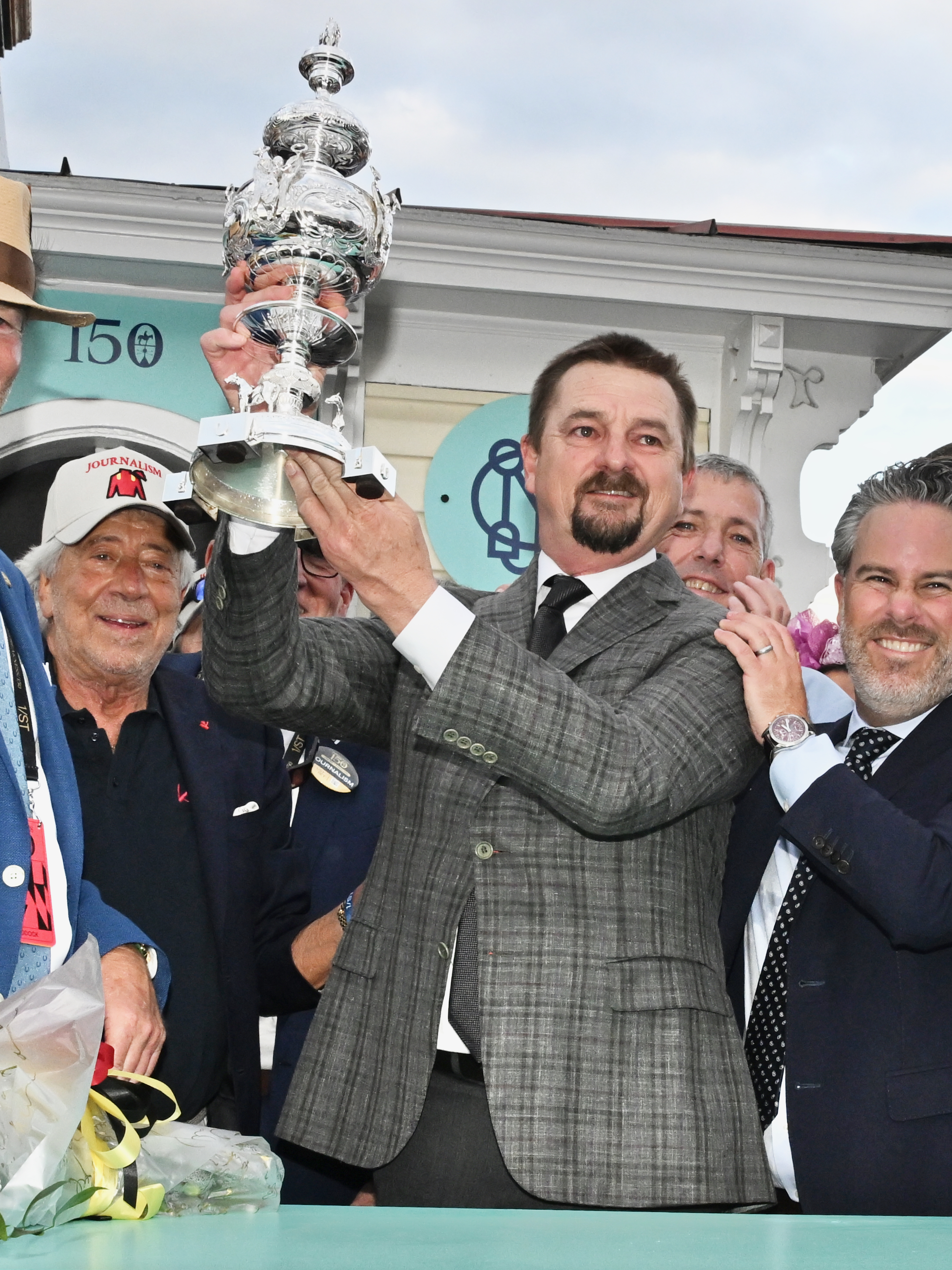
- McCarthy at the 2025 Preakness Stakes

Personal information
- Born: February 1, 1971 (age 55) Youngstown, Ohio, U.S.
- Occupation: Trainer

Horse racing career
- Sport: Horse racing
- Career wins: 386+ ongoing

Major racing wins
- Bob Hope Stakes (2014); Gamely Stakes (2016); Malibu Stakes (2017); Monrovia Stakes (2017); All American Stakes 2018); El Camino Real Derby (2018, 2021); Honeymoon Stakes (2018); Indiana Derby (2018); Beholder Mile Stakes (2020); John Henry Turf Championship Stakes (2018); Smarty Jones Stakes (2018); Oaklawn Handicap (2018); Triple Bend Stakes (2018); Cecil B. DeMille Stakes (2019); Frank E. Kilroe Mile (2019); Pegasus World Cup (2019); Apple Blossom Handicap (2020); Ashland Stakes (2020); Beholder Mile Stakes (2020); La Jolla Handicap (2020); Mathis Brothers Mile Stakes (2020); Pat Day Mile Stakes (2020); Twilight Derby (2020); La Cañada Stakes (2021); Santa Anita Derby (2025); American Turf Stakes (2026); San Diego Handicap (2026) Breeders' Cup wins: Breeders' Cup Dirt Mile (2018) American Classic races wins: Preakness Stakes (2021, 2025)

Significant horses
- Ce Ce, City of Light, Liam the Charmer, Paved, Rombauer, Smooth Like Strait, Journalism
- Updated on April 6, 2025

Michael W. McCarthy (born February 1, 1971) is an American trainer of Thoroughbred racehorses best known for winning the 2018 Breeders' Cup Dirt Mile with City of Light, the 2021 Preakness Stakes with Rombauer, and the 150th Preakness Stakes in 2025 with Journalism.

California based, McCarthy worked for trainers Doug Peterson and Ben Cecil as well as Hall of Famer Todd Pletcher with whom he spent 11 years before going out on his own in 2014.
