= Rock Your World =

American racehorse

- Sire: Candy Ride
- Grandsire: Ride the Rails
- Dam: Charm the Maker
- Damsire: Empire Maker
- Sex: Stallion
- Foaled: February 28, 2018 (age 7)
- Country: United States
- Color: Dark Bay
- Breeder: Ron McAnally & Deborah McAnally
- Owner: Hronis Racing and Talla Racing
- Trainer: John W. Sadler
- Record: 5: 3-0-0
- Earnings: $591,600

Major wins
- Pasadena Stakes (2021); Santa Anita Derby (2021)
- Last updated on 5 June 2021

Rock Your World (foaled February 28, 2018) is an American Thoroughbred racehorse who won the 2021 Santa Anita Derby.

== Background ==
Rock Your World is a dark bay stallion who was bred in Kentucky by Ron and Deborah McAnally. He was sired by Candy Ride, an Argentinian-bred stallion who was undefeated in six starts on turf and dirt in Argentina and the United States. Candy Ride has since become one of the top ten sires in North America whose progeny includes American Horse of the Year Gun Runner and champion Shared Belief. Rock Your World's dam is Charm the Maker, a stakes-winning daughter of the Belmont Stakes winner Empire Maker. His dam, second dam, and third dam were all stakes winners for the McAnallys, and were trained by Ron McAnally during his Hall of Fame career.

Rock Your World was sold at the Keeneland 2019 Yearling Sale for $650,000. He is owned by Hronis Racing (Kosta and Pete Hronis) and Talla Racing (Michael Talla) and is trained by John W. Sadler.

== Racing career ==
Rock Your World did not race at age two as Sadler needed to give the colt time to grow into his frame. He made his debut on January 1, 2021, in a six-furlong maiden special weight race on the turf at Santa Anita Park, going off as the 5-2 favorite in a field of 12. He was just behind the early leaders while racing three-wide. He took the lead with a quarter-mile remaining and pulled away in the stretch to win by 1 3/4 lengths.

He made his next start on February 27 in the Pasadena Stakes at a distance of one mile on the Santa Anita turf course. He was the second betting choice in a field of five to Cathkin Peak. Rock Your World stalked the early lead but had trouble changing leads at the top of the stretch, opening a gap for Cathkin Peak to get an early jump. Rock Your World then found his stride and closed ground three wide to win by 2 1/4 lengths. "This horse is still really green", said Sadler. "It's funny, we schooled him yesterday morning at 9:30 in the paddock, no problem. Today, when we put the saddle on him, tight as hell! He's got lessons to learn, but he's got a lot of talent."

Rock Your World made his first start on the dirt in the Grade One Santa Anita Derby on April 3. Having drawn an inside post position, he was ridden hard to take the early lead, running a fast opening quarter of 22.42 seconds to avoid getting trapped in traffic. He was then able to slow down the pace and was never seriously challenged. He drew away in the stretch to win by 4 1/4 lengths.

The win qualified Rock Your World for the 2021 Kentucky Derby, in which he was expected to be one of the leading contenders. However, he was bumped at the start and never factored after that, finishing 17th in the field of 19. He looked to rebound in the 2021 Belmont Stakes, where he faded to sixth after running second for most of the race.

== Statistics ==
| Date | Age | Distance | Surface | Race | Grade | Track | Odds | Field | Finish | Winning Time | Winning (Losing) Margin | Jockey | Ref |
|---|---|---|---|---|---|---|---|---|---|---|---|---|---|
| Jan 1, 2021 | 3 | 6 furlongs | Turf (firm) | Maiden special weight | | Santa Anita Park | 2.30* | 12 | 1 | 1:08.47 | 1 3/4 lengths | Joel Rosario | |
| Feb 27, 2021 | 3 | 1 mile | Turf (firm) | Pasadena Stakes | Listed | Santa Anita Park | 1.10 | 5 | 1 | 1:34.39 | 2 1/4 lengths | Umberto Rispoli | |
| Apr 3, 2021 | 3 | 1 1/8 miles | Dirt (fast) | Santa Anita Derby | I | Santa Anita Park | 5.20 | 9 | 1 | 1:49.17 | 4 1/4 lengths | Umberto Rispoli | |
| May 1, 2021 | 3 | 1 1/4 miles | Dirt (fast) | Kentucky Derby | I | Churchill Downs | 4.70 | 19 | 17 | 2:01.02 | (24 1/4 lengths) | Joel Rosario | |
| Jun 5, 2021 | 3 | 1 1/2 miles | Dirt (fast) | Belmont Stakes | I | Belmont Park | 5.00 | 8 | 6 | 2:27.11 | (22 lengths) | Joel Rosario | |

An asterisk after the odds means Rock Your World was the post-time favorite

== Pedigree ==
Pedigree of Rock Your World, dark bay colt, February 28, 2018
| Sire Candy Ride (ARG) | Ride the Rails | Cryptoclearance | Fappiano* |
| Sire Candy Ride (ARG) | Ride the Rails | Cryptoclearance | Naval Orange |
| Sire Candy Ride (ARG) | Ride the Rails | Herbalesian | Herbager (FR) |
| Sire Candy Ride (ARG) | Ride the Rails | Herbalesian | Alanesian |
| Sire Candy Ride (ARG) | Candy Girl (ARG) | Candy Stripes | Blushing Groom (FR) |
| Sire Candy Ride (ARG) | Candy Girl (ARG) | Candy Stripes | Bubble Company (FR) |
| Sire Candy Ride (ARG) | Candy Girl (ARG) | City Girl (ARG) | Farnesio (ARG) |
| Sire Candy Ride (ARG) | Candy Girl (ARG) | City Girl (ARG) | Cithara |
| Dam Charm the Maker | Empire Maker | Unbridled | Fappiano* |
| Dam Charm the Maker | Empire Maker | Unbridled | Gana Facil |
| Dam Charm the Maker | Empire Maker | Toussaud | El Gran Senor |
| Dam Charm the Maker | Empire Maker | Toussaud | Image of Reality |
| Dam Charm the Maker | Charm the Giant (IRE) | Giant's Causeway | Storm Cat |
| Dam Charm the Maker | Charm the Giant (IRE) | Giant's Causeway | Mariah's Storm |
| Dam Charm the Maker | Charm the Giant (IRE) | Olympic Charmer | Olympio |
| Dam Charm the Maker | Charm the Giant (IRE) | Olympic Charmer | Light a Charm (family 9-f) |

* Rock Your World is inbred 4S x 4D to the stallion Fappiano, meaning that he appears fourth generation on the sire side of his pedigree and fourth on the dam side of his pedigree.
