= Walker Buehler =

American baseball player (born 1994)

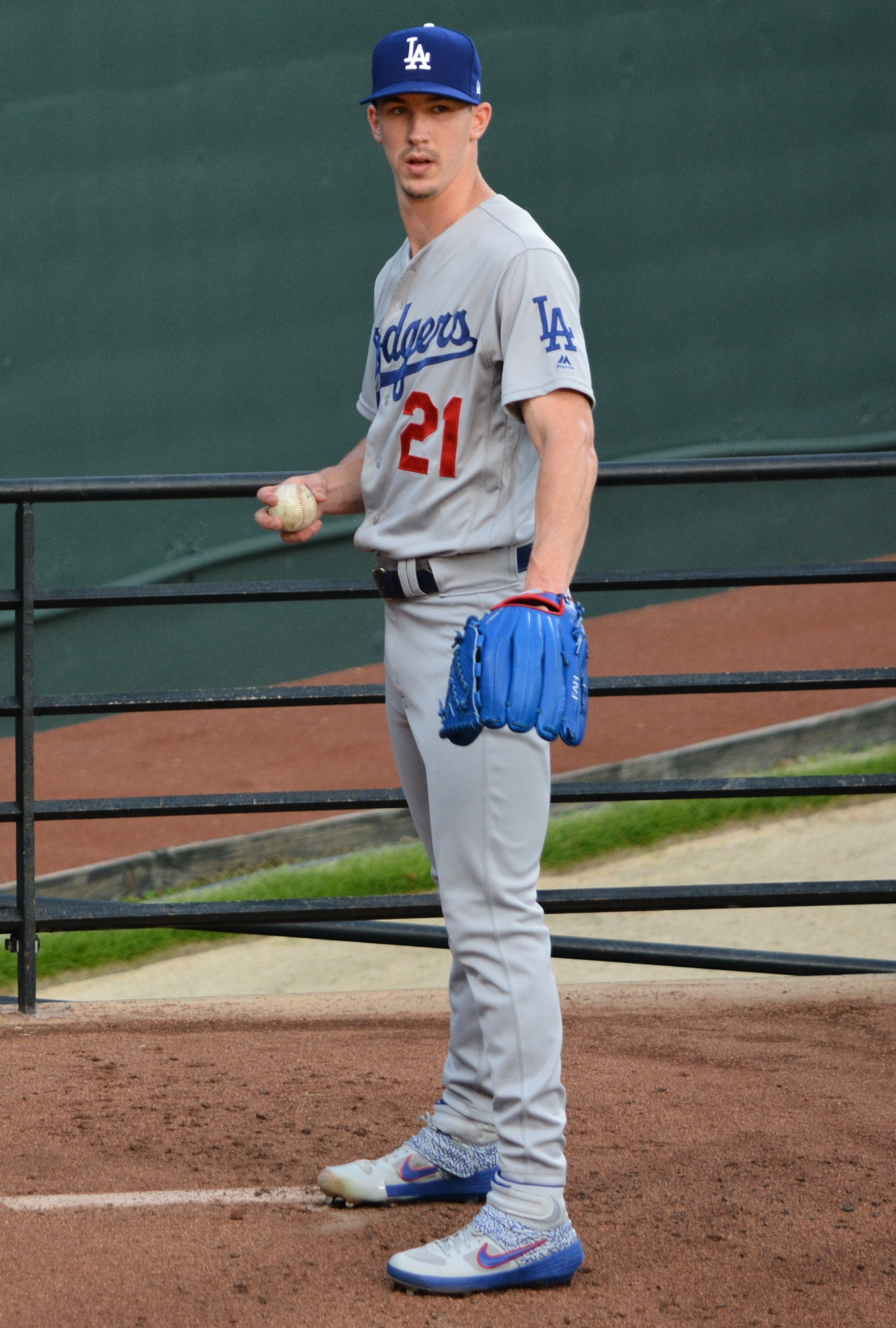
- Buehler with the Los Angeles Dodgers in 2019

Free agent
- Pitcher
- Born: July 28, 1994 (age 32); Lexington, Kentucky, U.S.
- Bats: Right Throws: Right

MLB debut
- September 7, 2017, for the Los Angeles Dodgers

MLB statistics (through 2026 season)
- Win–loss record: 66–35
- Earned run average: 3.69
- Strikeouts: 977
- Stats at Baseball Reference

Teams
- Los Angeles Dodgers (2017–2022, 2024); Boston Red Sox (2025); Philadelphia Phillies (2025); San Diego Padres (2026)

Career highlights and awards
- 2× All-Star (2019, 2021); 2× World Series champion (2020, 2024); All-MLB First Team (2021); Pitched in a combined no-hitter (May 4, 2018)

Walker Anthony Buehler (born July 28, 1994) is an American professional baseball pitcher who is a free agent. He has played in Major League Baseball (MLB) for the Los Angeles Dodgers, Boston Red Sox, Philadelphia Phillies, and San Diego Padres.

Buehler played college baseball for the Vanderbilt Commodores and was a member of their 2014 College World Series championship team. He was selected by the Dodgers 24th overall in the 2015 MLB draft and made his MLB debut in 2017. Buehler was an All-Star in 2019 and 2021 and helped the Dodgers win the 2020 and 2024 World Series, earning the series-clinching save in the latter.

== Early life ==
Walker Anthony Buehler was born on July 28, 1994, in Lexington, Kentucky. Buehler attended Henry Clay High School in Lexington. Buehler grew up a fan of the Cincinnati Reds, emulating Reds pitchers Aaron Harang, Bronson Arroyo, and Johnny Cueto. He also grew up a fan of Justin Verlander, courtesy of his grandfather being from Detroit. He was drafted by the Pittsburgh Pirates in the 14th round of the 2012 Major League Baseball draft but did not sign and instead chose to play college baseball for the Vanderbilt Commodores.

== College career ==
As a freshman in 2013, he made 9 starts and appeared in 16 games. He had a 4–3 record with a 3.14 earned run average (ERA) and 57 strikeouts. As a sophomore, he went 12–2 with 111 strikeouts and a 2.64 ERA and was a member of the 2014 College World Series championship team. On June 16, 2014, Buehler pitched 5 1/3 innings of no-hit relief, retiring the first nine batters he faced and striking out seven batters in Vanderbilt's win over the University of California, Irvine.

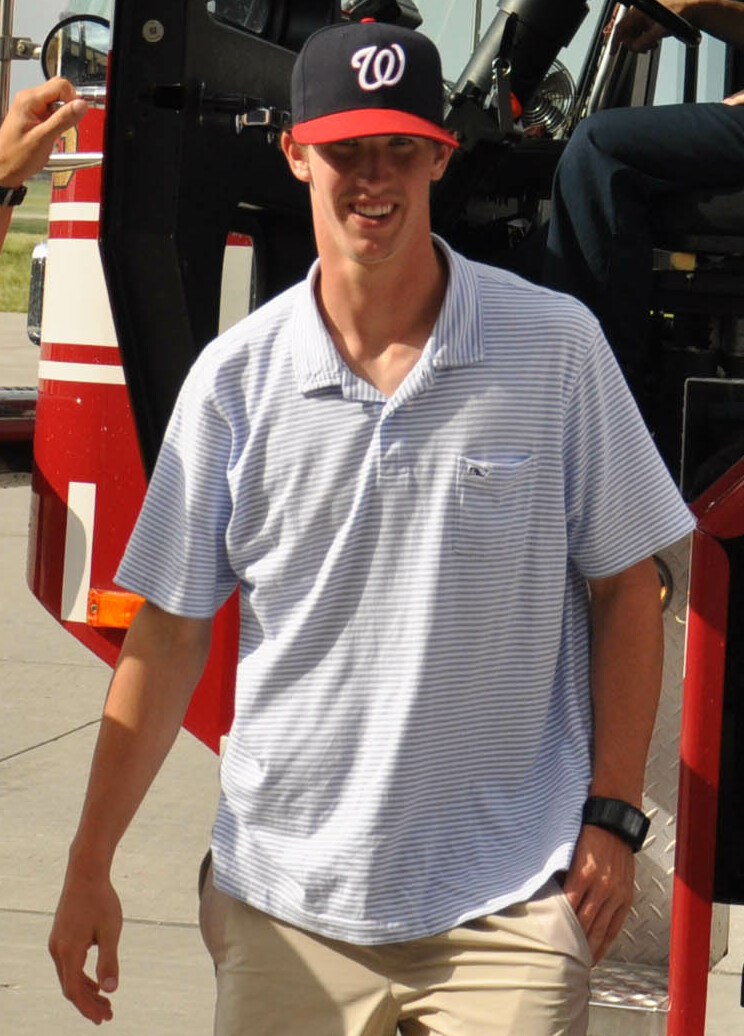
Buehler as a Vanderbilt sophomore in 2014

After the 2014 season Buehler pitched once for the U.S. collegiate team and played for the Yarmouth–Dennis Red Sox of the Cape Cod Baseball League (CCBL). He posted a 0.63 earned run average with 24 strikeouts over 28 2/3 innings pitched for the Red Sox. In the 2014 CCBL playoffs, he did not allow a run in 15 1/3 innings, won both of his starts, and was a co-winner of MVP honors, leading the Red Sox to the league championship.

In 2015, as a junior, he posted a 2.95 ERA in 88 1/3 innings for the Commodores, while striking out 92 and walking 30. Over the course of his three-year college career, he went 21–7 with a 2.87 ERA in 51 games, striking out 260 against only 86 walks.

== Professional career ==
=== Draft and minor leagues ===
Buehler was selected by the Los Angeles Dodgers with the 24th overall selection of the 2015 Major League Baseball draft and signed on July 17, 2015, for a $1.78 million bonus. Soon after his signing, it was revealed that he would require Tommy John surgery and would therefore be sidelined for a significant period with recovery. He finally made his professional baseball debut on August 23, 2016, for the Arizona League Dodgers, striking out three and retiring all six batters he faced. He was then promoted to the Great Lakes Loons of the Midwest League on August 28. He appeared in two games for the Loons, making one start, and did not allow a run or a hit in the three innings he pitched.

Buehler began the 2017 season with the Rancho Cucamonga Quakes of the California League and allowed only three runs in 16 1/3 innings over five starts before he was promoted to the Double-A Tulsa Drillers of the Texas League on May 2. While with the Drillers, he made 11 starts with a 3.49 ERA and was selected to appear in the mid-season Texas League all-star game. He was promoted to the Triple-A Oklahoma City Dodgers at mid-season where he made three starts before transitioning to the bullpen in preparation for a potential September major league callup. He had a 4.63 ERA in 23 1/3 innings for Oklahoma City. At the end of the season, he was selected as the Dodgers minor league pitcher of the year.

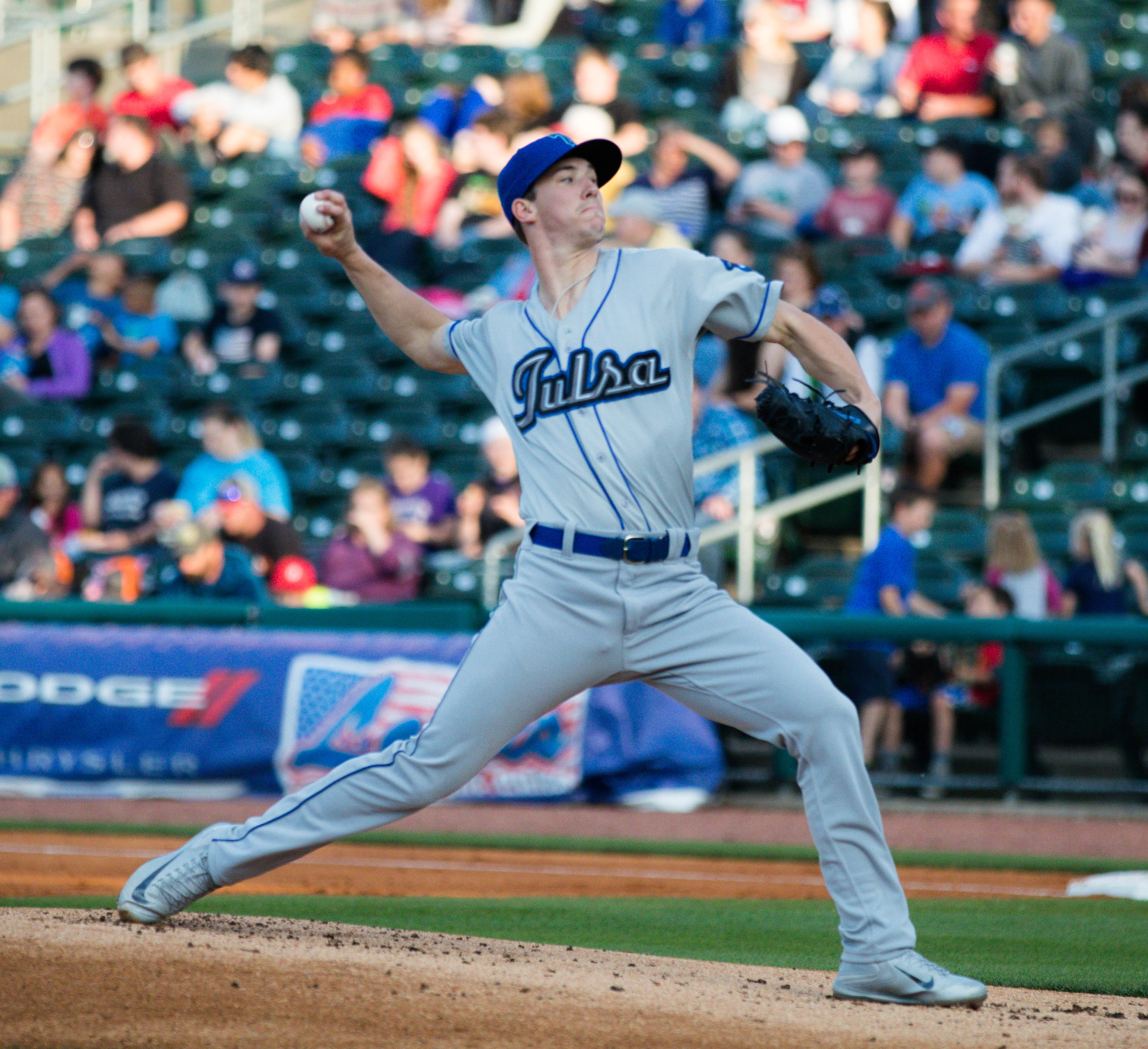
Buehler with the Tulsa Drillers in 2017

=== Los Angeles Dodgers (2017–2024) ===
==== 2017 ====
The Dodgers added Buehler to the major league roster for the first time on September 6, 2017, and he made his major league debut that night with two scoreless innings of relief against the Colorado Rockies. His first MLB strikeout was against Charlie Blackmon of the Rockies. He picked up his first major league win with a scoreless inning of relief against the Philadelphia Phillies on September 21. Overall, Buehler appeared in eight Dodgers games in 2017, allowing eight runs in 9 1/3 innings (7.71 ERA) with 12 strikeouts and eight walks.

==== 2018 ====
Buehler made his first major league start on April 23, 2018, against the Miami Marlins, pitching five scoreless innings. On May 4, against the San Diego Padres, he took a no-hitter through six innings, with eight strikeouts, until being taken out of the game after 93 pitches. Three relief pitchers combined to finish it off as the Dodgers won 4–0, the first combined no-hitter in franchise history. He was placed on the disabled list on June 21 because of a rib injury. He returned to make an appearance out of the bullpen on June 28 but allowed five earned runs in one inning before returning to the disabled list. On July 13, Buehler made his first start in over a month against the Los Angeles Angels, allowing two solo home runs to Kole Calhoun but no other earned runs. He set a new career high in strikeouts with nine on August 22. After three more nine-strikeout starts, he struck out 12 on September 19 against the Colorado Rockies.

On October 1, Buehler started the NL West Tie-Breaker Game against the Colorado Rockies. He picked up the win, giving up only one hit and allowing no runner to advance past second base. He also got his first career MLB run batted in in his 47th plate appearance. In 24 appearances for the Dodgers (23 starts and one relief appearance) in 2018, Buehler was 8–5 with a 2.62 ERA and 151 strikeouts. In the 2018 NLDS against the Atlanta Braves, he started one game and allowed five runs in five innings; in the 2018 NLCS against the Milwaukee Brewers he started two games, allowing five runs in 11 2/3 innings; and he threw seven scoreless innings in Game 3 of the 2018 World Series against the Boston Red Sox. Buehler finished third in voting for the National League Rookie of the Year, behind Atlanta Braves outfielder Ronald Acuña Jr. and Washington Nationals outfielder Juan Soto.

==== 2019 ====
On April 11, Buehler hit his first career home run off of Michael Wacha of the St. Louis Cardinals. On June 21, he threw his first complete game against the Colorado Rockies, becoming the first Dodger pitcher with over 15 strikeouts and no walks. He struck out 16 Rockies, giving up three hits on 111 pitches. He was selected to the 2019 MLB All-Star Game, his first all-star appearance, in which he gave up one run in one inning. On August 3, Buehler pitched another complete game, against the San Diego Padres. He struck out 15 Padre hitters and walked none; San Diego's only run was a Manuel Margot solo home run. At the same time he became only the third pitcher in MLB history (after Dwight Gooden and Pedro Martínez) to pitch multiple games with 15 strikeouts and no walks in the same season.

Buehler finished the 2019 regular season with a record of 14–4, and a 3.26 ERA (9th in the NL) in 30 starts, with two complete games and 215 strikeouts. His .778 win–loss percentage was the best in the league, and he also led the league in complete games with two. He finished ninth in the Cy Young Award voting. Buehler was named the Dodgers' game one starter for the NLDS. He allowed only one hit in six scoreless innings while striking out eight and walking three to pick up the win. He also started the deciding fifth game of the series, allowing only one run in 6 2/3 innings while striking out seven in a game the Dodgers lost in extra innings to the eventual World Champion Washington Nationals.

==== 2020 ====
In the pandemic-shortened 2020 season, Buehler posted a 1–0 record with a 3.44 ERA in eight starts, striking out 42 batters in 36.2 innings. Buehler started the first games of the first and second round playoff series against the Milwaukee Brewers and San Diego Padres, pitching just four innings in each game, with three total runs allowed. In the NLCS against the Atlanta Braves, he started the first and sixth games, working a total of 11 innings with only one run allowed while striking out 13. He was the winning pitcher in game 6. In the third game of the 2020 World Series, Buehler picked up the win against the Tampa Bay Rays, striking out 10 in six innings while allowing one earned run on three hits. He was the third-youngest pitcher with 10 or more strikeouts and three or fewer hits in a World Series game, behind only Ed Walsh in 1906 and Josh Beckett in 2003. The Dodgers won the World Series in six games.

==== 2021 ====
Buehler was eligible for salary arbitration for the first time before the 2021 season. On February 10, he signed a two-year contract with the Dodgers for $8 million. On June 20, Buehler won his seventh game of the season, tying Kirby Higbe for the Dodgers franchise record of 23 consecutive starts without a loss, in Buehler's case going back to the 2019 season. (Higby's feat dated back to the 1940s.) He was a 2021 National League All Star, and the July 2021 NL Pitcher of the Month.

Buehler was 16–4 (.800; 2nd in the NL) in the 2021 regular season, with a 2.47 ERA (3rd) and 212 strikeouts (7th). His 16 wins were 3rd in the league. He gave up 6.458 hits per 9 innings (2nd in the NL), and had a WHIP of 0.968 (4th). Buehler started the first game of the 2021 NLDS against the San Francisco Giants, allowing three runs on 6 1/3 innings to take the loss. He then started Game 4 on short rest, the first time he had done that in his career. In the game, he allowed one run on three hits in 4 1/3 innings. He struggled in his first start in the 2021 NLCS, allowing four runs on six hits while walking three in 3 2/3 innings in game 3. He again pitched on short rest in game 6 after Max Scherzer was unable to go, and allowed seven hits and four runs (three of them on a home run by Eddie Rosario) in four innings while striking out six, as the Dodgers were eliminated from the playoffs by the eventual champion Atlanta Braves.

==== 2022 ====
Buehler made his first Opening Day start on April 8 for the Dodgers against the Rockies. He allowed two runs in five innings to record the win. On April 25, he pitched his first career shutout against the Arizona Diamondbacks, striking out 10 batters and allowing only three hits and no walks. Buehler made 12 starts for the Dodgers in 2022, with a 6–3 record and 4.02 ERA. He left a game with the Giants on June 10 because of discomfort in his pitching elbow, and had arthroscopic surgery in June to remove bone spurs in his elbow.

This eventually resulted in him undergoing season-ending surgery on his right arm in August 2022. After his surgery was performed, the Dodgers announced that Buehler underwent both his second Tommy John surgery in which his ulnar collateral ligament was replaced, as well as flexor tendon repair, likely keeping him sidelined until the 2024 season. Despite his injury, the Dodgers signed him to an $8.025 million contract for the 2023 season to avoid salary arbitration.

==== 2023 ====
Buehler and the Dodgers initially hoped he would be able to rejoin the team in September and possibly for the postseason. However, after one two-inning minor league rehab appearance the team announced that he would not return in 2023 and hoped to be back for the start of the 2024 season.

==== 2024 ====
After missing all of the 2023 season, Buehler signed a one-year, $8.025 million contract for 2024 in his final year of arbitration, matching his salary from the previous season. Buehler was activated from the injured list on May 6 and made his first start in almost two years.

In the weeks after returning from his injury, Buehler struggled and recorded a 5.84 ERA in 37 innings pitched. After a rough outing on June 18 in which he surrendered seven earned runs in four innings to the Colorado Rockies, Buehler returned to the injured list with a hip injury. Concerned about his performance, Buehler left the team to work out by himself at a private sports facility in Florida before rejoining their AAA affiliate in Oklahoma City for another rehab stint, with mixed results. The Dodgers activated him on August 14 for his first major league start in almost two months, and he again struggled, leading him to say that he was not meeting his standard of performance. He remained in the Dodgers rotation the rest of the season due to the remaining starters being mainly injured, making 16 starts and finishing with a 1–6 record and 5.38 ERA.

Buehler made his first postseason start since 2021 in Game 3 of the NLDS against the Padres, allowing six runs on seven hits in five innings. He did a better job in his next start, Game 3 of the NLCS against the New York Mets, when he struck out six in four scoreless innings. In Game 3 of the World Series, he struck out five while only allowing two hits in five scoreless innings, picking up the win. In Game 5, Buehler pitched the ninth inning on only one day of rest, inducing a groundout and then striking out the final two batters of the game to pick up his first career Major League save as the Dodgers clinched the World Series championship for the eighth time, defeating the Yankees.

=== Boston Red Sox (2025) ===
On December 28, 2024, Buehler signed a one-year contract with the Boston Red Sox worth $21.05 million, plus incentives.

Buehler made his Red Sox debut on March 29, 2025, giving up four runs on seven hits in 4 1/3 innings against the Texas Rangers, getting the loss. He earned his first win in a Red Sox uniform in his next start, despite giving up five earned runs on seven hits in 5 innings. Buehler was placed on the injured list (IL) on May 2 due to shoulder inflammation. He returned to action on May 20 against the New York Mets, pitching 2 1/3 hitless innings before being ejected by home plate umpire Mike Estabrook for arguing balls and strikes.

Buehler continued to struggle after that incident. In June, he only lasted more than four innings once - a seven-inning performance against the New York Yankees in which he gave up three runs, the fewest runs he gave up in a start in June. His June ERA was 11.07, raising his then season total to 6.45. He was able to reduce his ERA to 5.72 in July, going five innings in three of his four starts, including a seven-inning performance against the Philadelphia Phillies. On July 27, Buehler went 4 2/3 innings and gave up three runs on four hits against the Los Angeles Dodgers, his former team.

Buehler's future in the rotation looked uncertain as of early August, as he again failed to reach five innings pitched in another subpar performance against the Houston Astros. But he bounced back with six scoreless innings in his next start against the San Diego Padres - his first scoreless outing all season, aside from the 2 1/3 innings he had pitched in May before he was ejected. On August 22, following two more below-average starts, Buehler was moved to the bullpen.

On August 29, Buehler was released by the Red Sox. While the normal routine would have been to designate him for assignment and seek to make a trade, they respectfully wanted to give him a chance to catch on with another team in advance of the playoff roster deadline cutoff. His final numbers with Boston was 7–7 with a 5.45 ERA in 22 starts.

=== Philadelphia Phillies (2025) ===
On August 31, 2025, Buehler signed a minor league contract with the Philadelphia Phillies. He made one start for the Triple-A Lehigh Valley IronPigs, where he allowed two runs (one earned) across three innings. On September 12, the Phillies selected Buehler's contract, adding him to their active roster. He made three appearances (two starts) for Philadelphia, posting a 3–0 record and 0.66 ERA with eight strikeouts across 13 2/3 innings pitched. He was placed on the team's postseason roster for the NLDS against the Dodgers, but was not used as the Phillies were eliminated in four games.

=== San Diego Padres (2026) ===
On February 16, 2026, Buehler signed a minor league contract with the San Diego Padres. On March 25, the Padres selected Buehler's contract after he made the team's Opening Day roster.

== Personal life ==
Buehler has heard the famous roll call scene from the 1986 film Ferris Bueller's Day Off many times throughout his life. Buehler embraced the nickname "Ferris," incorporating it into his Twitter handle and wearing it on his jersey during the 2018 MLB Players Weekend. He chose to wear the nickname "Buetane" for the 2019 MLB Players Weekend.

Buehler is a native of Lexington, Kentucky, the "Horse Capital of the World," home to the Kentucky Horse Park, The Red Mile and Keeneland race courses, and grew up a big fan of horse racing. He has a minority ownership stake in 2020 Kentucky Derby and 2020 Breeders' Cup Classic winner Authentic, trained by Bob Baffert. Buehler attended the 2020 Breeders' Cup Classic.

Buehler began dating McKenzie Marcinek when they were in the eighth grade. They married in December 2021. Their first child, a daughter, was born in February 2024.

== See also ==
- 2014 NCAA Division I baseball tournament
- 2014 Vanderbilt Commodores baseball team
- List of Los Angeles Dodgers no-hitters
- List of Major League Baseball no-hitters
- List of World Series starting pitchers
- Los Angeles Dodgers award winners and league leaders

Awards and achievements
Preceded by Sean Manaea	No-hit game May 4, 2018 (with Cingrani, García & Liberatore)	Succeeded by James Paxton
Preceded by Jacob deGrom	National League Pitcher of the Month; July 2021	Succeeded by Adam Wainwright
