= 1931 Kentucky Derby =

Horse race

57th Kentucky Derby
- Kentucky Derby
- Grade I stakes race
- Location: Churchill Downs
- Date: May 16, 1931
- Winning horse: Twenty Grand
- Jockey: Charles Kurtsinger
- Trainer: James G. Rowe Jr.
- Owner: Greentree Stable
- Surface: Dirt

The 1931 Kentucky Derby was the 57th running of the Kentucky Derby. The race took place on May 16, 1931. Horses Equipoise, Up, and Don Leon scratched before the race. Twenty Grand's winning time set a new Derby record (later broken). The winner was owned and bred by the Greentree Stable of Helen Hay Whitney. It marked the fourth time in the Derby's history that a woman owned the winning horse and the second time that a woman was both owner and breeder.

The 1931 Preakness Stakes was held one week earlier, on May 9, making this the most recent time that the Preakness was run before the Kentucky Derby. Until the 2020 Kentucky Derby and 2020 Preakness Stakes were rescheduled to follow the 2020 Belmont Stakes due to the COVID-19 pandemic, 1931 was the most recent time that the Kentucky Derby was not the first leg of the Triple Crown.

== Full results ==
Finished	Post	Horse	Jockey	Trainer	Owner	Time / behind
1st	5	Twenty Grand	Charley Kurtsinger	James G. Rowe Jr.	Greentree Stable	2:01.80
2nd	1	Sweep All	Frank Coltiletti	Clyde Van Dusen	Dixiana	4
3rd	10	Mate	George Ellis	James W. Healy	Albert C. Bostwick Jr.	1
4th	6	Spanish Play	Charles E. Allen	George Land	Knebelkamp & Morris	4
5th	7	Boys Howdy	Gilbert Riley	Loyd Gentry Sr.	Harry C. Hatch	1 1/2
6th	12	Insco	Steve O'Donnell	Charles E. Durnell	Griffin Watkins	6
7th	9	Pittsburgher	Charles Corbett	James H. Moody	Shady Brook Farm Stable	1
8th	3	The Mongol	James McCoy	William Reed	Hamburg Place	Head
9th	4	Ladder	Louis Schaefer	Jack R. Price	Walter J. Salmon Sr.	1
10th	2	Anchors Aweigh	Earl Steffen	James G. Rowe Jr.	Greentree Stable	Head
11th	8	Surf Board	Clarence Watters	James G. Rowe Jr.	Greentree Stable	2
12th	11	Prince d'Amour	Eugene James	Nathaniel K. Beal	Joseph Leiter	8

- Winning Breeder: Greentree Stable; (KY)

== Payout ==
Post	Horse	Win	Place	Show
5	Twenty Grand	$ 3.76	3.00	2.60
1	Sweep All		15.58	7.16
10	Mate			3.62

- The winner received a purse of $48,725 and $5,000 Gold Cup.
- Second place received $6,000.
- Third place received $3,000.
- Fourth place received $1,000.
