= 2020 Breeders' Cup =

Thoroughbred horse racing event

- 2020 Breeders' Cup logo
- Class: Championship Event Series
- Location: Keeneland, Lexington, Kentucky
- Race type: Thoroughbred
- Website: www.breederscup.com

Race information
- Distance: See individual races
- Surface: Turf, Dirt
- Purse: Varies by Race; from $1 million to $6 million

The 2020 Breeders' Cup World Championships was the 37th edition of the premier event of the North American thoroughbred horse racing year. The 14 races, all but one of which were Grade I, took place on November 6 and 7 at Keeneland racetrack in Lexington, Kentucky. The races were telecast by NBCSN on Friday and early Saturday, and by NBC later on Saturday.

The Breeders' Cup is generally regarded as the end of the North American racing season, although a few Grade I events take place in later November and December. The event typically determines champions in many of the Eclipse Award divisions.

== Qualifying ==
A maximum of 14 horses (12 in the Dirt Mile) are allowed to start in each race. Horses can automatically qualify by winning one of the designated races in the Breeders' Cup Challenge series, which provide "Win and You're In" berths in a specified division of the Breeders' Cup. Other pre-entries are ranked by a points system and the judgement of a panel of experts.

On October 28, a total of 201 pre-entries were taken for the Breeders' Cup races, of which 48 horses were automatic qualifiers. Despite strict travel protocols relating to the COVID-19 pandemic, 47 horses from overseas were pre-entered, including 10 from the barn of leading Irish trainer Aidan O'Brien.

== Event preparation ==
On August 17, 2018, the Breeders' Cup organization announced that Keeneland would host the event for the second time in 2020. Keeneland's first Breeders' Cup in 2015 was highlighted by American Pharoah's win in the Breeders' Cup Classic, completing the Grand Slam of Thoroughbred racing. Because of the COVID-19 pandemic in the United States, the racing schedule leading up to the event was disrupted. Keeneland had hoped that they would be able to hold the event before a live audience but ultimately decided to limit attendance to the participants and essential personnel. Despite this, they were able to maintain the same purse structure as in 2019, providing a total of $31 million in purses and awards.

== Races ==
The sequence of races was announced on October 28 along with the wagering menu and guaranteed pools for various multi-race wagers. For example, there was a guaranteed minimum pool of $2 million for the late Pick 4 and late Pick 5 wagers on Saturday. In part because of a major upset in the Mile, a winning 50¢ Pick 5 wager paid $81,406.70.

Prior to the start of racing, jockey Christophe Soumillon tested positive for the coronavirus and did not race. Two of the horses he was scheduled to ride, Order of Australia and Tarnawa, subsequently won their races. Jockeys Pierre-Charles Boudot and Colin Keane picked up the mounts, and earned their first wins at the Breeders' Cup. Trainer Brad Cox had four winners over the weekend, tying Richard Mandella's record.

=== Friday, November 6 ===
The track condition was fast on the main track and good on the turf. Essential Quality established himself up as the early favorite for the 2021 Kentucky Derby by winning the Juvenile with a late run. Horses trained in Europe were winless in the three turf races, though European-bred Aunt Pearl did win the Juvenile Fillies Turf.

Race name	Post time (EST)	Sponsor	Distance/Surface	Restrictions	Purse	Winner (Bred)	Odds	Margin
Juvenile Turf Sprint	2:30 PM		5 1/2 furlongs (Turf)	2-year-olds	$1 million	Golden Pal (FL)	0.80*	3/4 lengths
Juvenile Turf	3:10 PM	presented by Coolmore America	1 mile (Turf)	2-year-old colts and geldings	$1 million	Fire at Will (FL)	30.20	3 lengths
Juvenile Fillies	3:50 PM		1 1/16 miles	2-year-old fillies	$2 million	Vequist (KY)	6.60	2 lengths
Juvenile Fillies Turf	4:30 PM		1 mile (Turf)	2-year-old fillies	$1 million	Aunt Pearl (IRE)	2.60*	2 1/2 lengths
Juvenile	5:10 PM	TVG presented by Thoroughbred Aftercare	1 1/16 miles	2-year-old colts and geldings	$2 million	Essential Quality (KY)	3.70	3/4 lengths

An asterisk after the odds means the horse was the post-time favorite.

Source: Equibase Charts

=== Saturday, November 7 ===
The main track was again fast, and Gamine set a new track record for seven furlongs while winning the Filly & Mare Sprint, the first Breeders' Cup race on the card, and Knicks Go set another track record in the Dirt Mile. In his fourth try, Whitmore finally won the Sprint at age seven with a come-from-behind win. Monomoy Girl, who had won the Distaff in 2018 but missed all of her 2019 season due to illness and injury, came back to win again in 2020. And Authentic capped off the program by winning the Classic, almost certainly locking up American Horse of the Year honors.

On the turf course, Glass Slippers became the first horse shipped from Europe to win at the 2020 event and the first European to ever win the Turf Sprint. European-based horses swept the remainder of the turf races with Audarya, longshot Order of Australia and Tarnawa winning the Filly & Mare Turf, Mile and Turf respectively. Order of Australia's win was the biggest upset of the weekend, at 73-1, and led an Aidan O'Brien sweep of the Mile.

Race Name	Post time (EST)	Sponsor	Distance/Surface	Restrictions	Purse	Winner (Bred)	Odds	Margin
Filly & Mare Sprint	12:02 PM		7 furlongs	3 yrs+ fillies & mares	$1 million	Gamine (KY)	1.05*	6 1/4 lengths
Turf Sprint	12:39 PM		5 1/2 furlongs (Turf)	3 yrs+	$1 million	Glass Slippers (GB)	10.20	1/2 length
Dirt Mile	1:18 PM	Big Ass Fans	1 mile	3 yrs+	$2 million	Knicks Go (MD)	1.80*	3 1/2 lengths
Filly & Mare Turf	1:57 PM	Maker's Mark	1 3/16 miles (Turf)	3 yrs+ fillies & mares	$2 million	Audarya (FR)	17.80	neck
Sprint	2:36 PM		6 furlongs	3 yrs+	$2 million	Whitmore (KY)	18.40	3 1/4 lengths
Mile	3:15 PM	Fanduel presented by the PDJF	1 mile (Turf)	3 yrs+	$2 million	Order of Australia (IRE)	73.20	1/2 lengths
Distaff	3:54 PM	Longines	1 1/8 miles	3 yrs+ fillies & mares	$2 million	Monomoy Girl	1.00*	1 3/4 lengths
Turf	4:33 PM	Longines	1 1/2 miles (Turf)	3 yrs+	$4 million	Tarnawa (IRE)	4.70	1 length
Classic	5:13 PM	Longines	1 1/4 miles	3 yrs+	$6 million	Authentic (KY)	4.20	2 1/4 lengths

Source: Equibase Charts
