= 2020 Preakness Stakes =

145th running Preakness Stakes

145th Preakness Stakes
- Preakness Stakes
- Grade I stakes race
- "The Run for the Black-Eyed Susans"
- Location: Pimlico Race Course; Baltimore, Maryland, U.S.
- Date: October 3, 2020
- Distance: 1 3/16 mi (9.5 furlongs; 1,900 m)
- Winning horse: Swiss Skydiver
- Winning time: 1:53.28
- Final odds: 11.70–1
- Jockey: Robby Albarado
- Trainer: Kenneth McPeek
- Owner: Peter J. Callahan
- Conditions: Fast
- Surface: Dirt
- Attendance: — (Note: The event was held without a live audience due to the COVID-19 pandemic in the United States.)

The 2020 Preakness Stakes was the 145th Preakness Stakes, a Grade I stakes race for three-year-old Thoroughbreds at a distance of 1 3/16 miles (1.9 km). The race is one leg of the American Triple Crown and is held annually at Pimlico Race Course in Baltimore, Maryland.

The Preakness is regularly scheduled to be held on the third Saturday in May, two weeks after the Kentucky Derby, but the 2020 running was rescheduled to Saturday, October 3, due to the COVID-19 pandemic. On September 2, it was announced that the race would be held without spectators, and it was won by filly Swiss Skydiver in the second-fastest time ever.

== Background ==
This was the first time since the 1945 Triple Crown races were affected by World War II that the event took place outside of its regular May schedule. With the Belmont Stakes run on June 20 and the Kentucky Derby on September 5, the Preakness became the final leg of the 2020 Triple Crown. As different horses won the Belmont and the Kentucky Derby, it was established prior to the Preakness that there would be no Triple Crown winner in 2020.

The race provided the winner with a berth in the Breeders' Cup Classic, held a month later on November 7.

Per a decision by the Maryland Jockey Club, "Maryland, My Maryland" was not played before the Preakness, as had been prior tradition—the song "which celebrates the Confederacy, is considered by some to be racist".

== Field ==
On September 22, the owners of Belmont Stakes winner Tiz the Law announced that he would not run in the Preakness. In his absence, the favorite was Authentic, the winner of the Kentucky Derby and Haskell Invitational. When entries were taken on September 28, Authentic drew post position 9 in a field of eleven. Key rivals were:

- Art Collector – winner of the Blue Grass Stakes and the Ellis Park Derby
- Thousand Words – winner of the Shared Belief Stakes
- Swiss Skydiver – winner of the Alabama Stakes, second in the Blue Grass Stakes and Kentucky Oaks
- Mr. Big News – third in the Kentucky Derby

== Results ==
Finish	Program Number	Horse	Trainer	Jockey	Morning	Final odds	Margin	Winnings
1	4	Swiss Skydiver	Kenneth McPeek	Robby Albarado	6–1	11.70	—	$600,000
2	9	Authentic	Bob Baffert	John Velazquez	9–5	1.50	head	$200,000
3	6	Jesus' Team	José D'Angelo	Jevian Toledo	30–1	40.90	10	$110,000
4	3	Art Collector	Tom Drury Jr.	Brian Hernandez Jr.	5–2	2.40	10	$60,000
5	8	Max Player	Steve Asmussen	Paco Lopez	15–1	11.50	11 1/4	$30,000
6	1	Excession	Steve Asmussen	Sheldon Russell	30–1	56.40	15	
7	2	Mr. Big News	Bret Calhoun	Gabriel Saez	12–1	15.10	16	
8	5	Thousand Words	Bob Baffert	Florent Geroux	6–1	7.30	16 1/2	
9	7	Ny Traffic	Saffie Joseph	Horacio Karamanos	15–1	19.00	21 1/4	
10	10	Pneumatic	Steve Asmussen	Joe Bravo	20–1	11.20	22 1/2	
11	11	Liveyourbeastlife	Jorge Abreu	Trevor McCarthy	30–1	34.70	32 3/4	

Track condition: Fast

Times: 1/4 mile – 0:24.48; 1/2 mile – 0:47.65; 3/4 mile – 1:11.24; mile – 1:34.74; final – 1:53.28.
Splits for each quarter-mile: (:24.48) (:23.17) (:23.59) (:23.50) (:18.54 for final 3/16)

== Payout ==
Pgm	Horse	Win	Place	Show
4	Swiss Skydiver	$25.40	$8.40	$5.80
9	Authentic	–	$3.60	$3.20
6	Jesus' Team	–	–	$12.20

- $1 Exacta (4–9) $37.80
- $1 Trifecta (4–9–6) $1,205.70
- $1 Superfecta (4–9–6–3) $5,053.00
- $1 Super High Five (4–9–6–3–8) $64,812.60
