= Art Collector (horse) =

American Thoroughbred racehorse (2017–2023)

- Sire: Bernardini
- Grandsire: A.P. Indy
- Dam: Distorted Legacy
- Damsire: Distorted Humor
- Sex: Stallion
- Foaled: February 11, 2017
- Died: August 17, 2023 (aged 6)
- Country: United States
- Color: Bay
- Breeder: Bruce Lunsford
- Owner: Bruce Lunsford
- Trainer: Joe Sharp (2019); Thomas Drury Jr. (2020); William I. Mott (2021)
- Record: 23: 11-3-0
- Earnings: US$4,231,290

Major wins
- Blue Grass Stakes (2020); Ellis Park Derby (2020); Alydar Stakes (2021, 2022); Charles Town Classic (2021, 2022); Woodward Stakes (2021); Pegasus World Cup (2023)
- Last updated on August 18, 2023

Art Collector (February 11, 2017 – August 17, 2023) was an American Thoroughbred racehorse who won the 2021 Woodward Stakes, the 2023 Pegasus World Cup and the Grade II Charles Town Classic twice. In a career spanning five seasons, he won or placed in seven graded stakes races.

== Racing career ==
=== 2019: Two-year-old season ===
Art Collector won a maiden and allowance race as a 2-year-old for trainer Joe Sharp. Later Art Collector was disqualified for his allowance win after a positive swab.

=== 2020: Three-year-old season ===
Racing as a three-year-old for trainer Thomas Drury Jr., Art Collector's win in the Grade 2 Blue Grass Stakes over eventual Preakness Stakes winning filly Swiss Skydiver earned him a berth in 2020 Kentucky Derby. Art Collector's Blue Grass victory was the colt's first graded stakes race and first graded stakes win for trainer Thomas Drury Jr. who has been training racehorses for thirty-eight years.

Art Collector then won the 2020 Ellis Park Derby before heading to the Kentucky Derby.

Made the second choice of the betting public behind Belmont Stakes and Travers Stakes winner Tiz the Law, an injury during a workout kept Art Collector out of the Derby, and instead he aimed towards the Preakness Stakes, the third leg of the COVID-19 pandemic affected 2020 Triple Crown.

Art Collector came fourth in the 2020 Preakness Stakes, a nose behind the third-place finisher. The filly he defeated in the Bluegrass, Swiss Skydiver, won the Preakness by a neck over Kentucky Derby winner Authentic.

His next start was the Breeders' Cup Dirt Mile on November 7, where he finished eighth behind the winner Knicks Go.

In the 2020 World's Best Racehorse Rankings, Art Collector was rated on 119, making him the equal 57th best racehorse in the world.

=== 2021: Four-year-old season ===
Art Collector began his 4YO campaign in June at Churchill Downs in the Kelly's Landing Overnight Stakes as the 6/5 favorite with a lackluster performance after veering at the start and being bumped to finish sixth. Art Collector was transfer to trainer William I. Mott's barn in July.

On 6 August, Art Collector made amends winning the Listed Alydar Stakes at Saratoga as the 9/5 favorite with plenty in hand after leading by nearly 4 lengths to finish 1 1/2 lengths in front of Night Ops in a time of 1:48.20 for the 1 1/8 miles trip.

Three weeks later on 27 August, Art Collector traveled to West Virginia for the Grade II Charles Town Classic where he stalked leader Sleepy Eyes Todd and overtook him in the stretch run and comfortably won by 1 1/2 lengths in a time of 1:49.39.

On 2 October, Art Collector produced his best performance of his career defeating a strong field of six runners to capture his first Grade I event, the Woodward Stakes at Belmont Park.

=== 2022: Five-year-old season ===
Art Collector was shipped in 2022 to compete in the Saudi Cup, but finished 12th in the 14-horse field. Following the trip to Saudi Arabia Art Collector raced three more times that year, winning the Alydar Stakes at Saratoga before returning to Charles Town to win his second straight Charles Town Classic. He completed the season with a sixth-place finish in the Lukas Classic Stakes.

=== 2023: Six-year-old season ===
As a six-year-old Art Collector started three times, winning the Grade I Pegasus World Cup at Gulfstream Park and finishing second in the New Orleans Classic Stakes and the Alysheba Stakes, both Grade II races.

== Death ==
In August 2023 Art Collector was in training at Saratoga Race Course to defend his title in the Charles Town Classic, but had developed laminitis. Trainer Bill Mott said that Art Collector was humanely euthanized on August 17 after the laminitis spread rapidly to all four feet over the course of three or four days. Owner Bruce Lunsford reminisced about Art Collector, saying he loved the horse and that he brought him the "highest high" when he won the Pegasus World Cup.

== Statistics ==
Date	Distance	Race	Grade/ Group	Track	Odds	Field	Finish	Time	Winning (Losing) Margin	Weight	Jockey	Ref
2019 – two-year-old season
Aug 16, 2019	5 1/2 furlongs	Maiden Special Weight		Saratoga	7.10	10	2	1:01.06	(3 lengths)	119 lbs.	John R. Velazquez	
Sep 5, 2019	6 1/2 furlongs	Maiden Special Weight		Kentucky Downs	1.30	12	1	1:21.07	1 1/4 lengths	120 lbs.	Adam Beschizza	
Oct 6, 2019	1 1/16 miles	Bourbon Stakes	III	Keeneland	7.30	14	7	1:43.06	(5 lengths)	118 lbs.	Luis Saez	
Nov 9, 2019	6 1/2 furlongs	Allowance		Churchill Downs	3.00	9	6	1:17.62	(4 1/2 lengths)	122 lbs.	Brian Hernandez Jr.	
Nov 30, 2019	6 furlongs	Allowance		Churchill Downs	3.60	7	7 (Note: Art Collector was first past the post and wagering was paid out but was disqualified later after returning a positive swab and was placed seventh)	1:10.39	7 1/2 lengths	122 lbs.	Brian Hernandez Jr.	
2020 – three-year-old season
May 17, 2020	7 furlongs	Allowance		Churchill Downs	6.60	11	1	1:22.65	2 3/4 lengths	118 lbs.	Brian Hernandez Jr.	
Jun 13, 2020	1 1/16 miles	Allowance		Churchill Downs	1.40*	4	1	1:41.35	6 1/2 lengths	118 lbs.	Brian Hernandez Jr.	
Jul 11, 2020	1 1/8 miles	Blue Grass Stakes	II	Keeneland	2.30	13	1	1:48.11	3 1/2 lengths	123 lbs.	Brian Hernandez Jr.	
Aug 9, 2020	1 1/8 miles	Ellis Park Derby	Listed	Ellis Park	0.40*	12	1	1:48.02	3 1/4 lengths	123 lbs.	Brian Hernandez Jr.	
Oct 3, 2020	1 3/16 miles	Preakness Stakes	I	Pimlico	2.40	11	4	1:53.28	(10 lengths)	126 lbs.	Brian Hernandez Jr.	
Nov 7, 2020	1 mile	Breeders' Cup Dirt Mile	I	Keeneland	4.90	12	8	1:33.85	(9 1/4 lengths)	123 lbs.	Brian Hernandez Jr.	
2021 – four-year-old season
Jun 25, 2021	7 furlongs	Kelly's Landing Overnight Stakes		Churchill Downs	1.20*	9	6	1:21.25	(5 3/4 lengths)	123 lbs.	Brian Hernandez Jr.	
Aug 6, 2021	1 1/8 miles	Alydar Stakes	Listed	Saratoga	1.80*	8	1	1:48.20	1 1/2 lengths	124 lbs.	Luis Saez	
Aug 27, 2021	1 1/8 miles	Charles Town Classic	II	Charles Town	1.30*	10	1	1:49.39	1 1/2 lengths	118 lbs.	Luis Saez	
Oct 2, 2021	1 1/8 miles	Woodward Stakes	I	Belmont Park	2.75	6	1	1:49.22	1 1/2 lengths	124 lbs.	Luis Saez	
Nov 6, 2021	1 1/4 miles	Breeders' Cup Classic	I	Del Mar	10.20	8	6	1:59.57	(14 1/2 lengths)	126 lbs.	Mike Smith	
2022 – five-year-old season
Feb 26, 2022	1,800 meters	Saudi Cup	I	King Abdulaziz	n/a (Note: Wagering is not allowed in Saudi Arabia. In British wagering, Art Collector was 16/1)	14	12	1:50.52	(20 1/4 lengths)	126 lbs	Luis Saez	
Aug 4, 2022	1 1/8 miles	Alydar Stakes	Listed	Saratoga	0.80*	5	1	1:51.84	2 lengths	124 lbs	Luis Saez	
Aug 26, 2022	1 1/8 miles	Charles Town Classic	II	Charles Town	0.50*	8	1	1:51.30	4 1/4 lengths	118 lbs.	Luis Saez	
Oct 1, 2022	1 1/8 miles	Lukas Classic Stakes	II	Churchill Downs	2.59	6	5	1:49.77	(6 1/2 lengths)	125 lbs.	Luis Saez	
2023 – six-year-old season
Jan 29, 2023	1 1/8 miles	Pegasus World Cup	I	Gulfstream Park	15.50	12	1	1:49.44	4 1/2 lengths	123 lbs.	Junior Alvarado	
Mar 25, 2023	1 1/8 miles	New Orleans Classic Stakes	II	Fair Grounds	0.80*	7	2	1:47.95	(4 3/4 lengths)	124 lbs.	Junior Alvarado	
May 5, 2023	1 1/16 miles	Alysheba Stakes	II	Churchill Downs	3.84	6	2	1:41.29	(2 lengths)	123 lbs.	Junior Alvarado	

Legend:
Dirt Turf
Notes:
An (*) asterisk after the odds means Art Collector was the post-time favorite.

== Pedigree ==
Pedigree of Art Collector, bay colt, February 11, 2017
Sire Bernardini	A.P. Indy	Seattle Slew	Bold Reasoning
Sire Bernardini	A.P. Indy	Seattle Slew	My Charmer
Sire Bernardini	A.P. Indy	Weekend Surprise	Secretariat
Sire Bernardini	A.P. Indy	Weekend Surprise	Lassie Dear
Sire Bernardini	Cara Rafaela	Quiet American	Fappiano
Sire Bernardini	Cara Rafaela	Quiet American	Demure
Sire Bernardini	Cara Rafaela	Old Fable	Spectacular Bid
Sire Bernardini	Cara Rafaela	Old Fable	Northern Fable
Dam Distorted Legacy	Distorted Humor	Forty Niner	Mr. Prospector
Dam Distorted Legacy	Distorted Humor	Forty Niner	File
Dam Distorted Legacy	Distorted Humor	Danzig's Beauty	Danzig
Dam Distorted Legacy	Distorted Humor	Danzig's Beauty	Sweetest Chant
Dam Distorted Legacy	Bunting	Private Account	Damascus
Dam Distorted Legacy	Bunting	Private Account	Numbered Account
Dam Distorted Legacy	Bunting	Flag Waver	Hoist The Flag
Dam Distorted Legacy	Bunting	Flag Waver	Bebopper (family: 11-g)
