= Alydar Stakes =

American thoroughbred horse racer

- Class: Listed stakes
- Location: Saratoga Race Course; Saratoga Springs, New York, United States
- Inaugurated: 2013
- Race type: Thoroughbred - Flat racing
- Website: www.pegasusworldcup.com

Race information
- Surface: Dirt
- Track: left-handed
- Qualification: Four-year-olds and up
- Purse: $120,000 (2021)

The Alydar Stakes is an American Thoroughbred horse race held annually in early August at Saratoga Race Course in Saratoga Springs, New York. Made a Listed race in 2019, it is contested on dirt at a distance of a mile and one-eighth. It is open to four-year-old non-winners in the current year of a Sweepstake other than a State-bred event.

== Records ==
Speed record:

- 1:47.45 @ 11/8 miles : Tom's d'Etat (2019)

Most wins:

- 2 - Art Collector (2021, 2022)

Most wins by a jockey:

- 2 - John Velazquez (2013, 2017)
- 2 - Irad Ortiz Jr. (2014, 2016)
- 2 - Joel Rosario (2015, 2019)
- 2 - Luis Saez (2021, 2022)

Most wins by a trainer:

- 2 - Todd A. Pletcherer (2013, 2017)
- 2 - Kiaran McLaughlin (2014, 2015)
- 2 - William I. Mott (2021, 2022)

Most wins by an owner:

- 2 - Bruce Lunsford (2021, 2022)

== Winners ==
Year	Winner	Age	Jockey	Trainer	Owner	Dist. (Miles)	Time	Win$
2022	Art Collector	5	Luis Saez	William I. Mott	Bruce Lunsford	11/8	1:51.84	$66,000
2021	Art Collector	4	Luis Saez	William I. Mott	Bruce Lunsford	11/8	1:48.20	$66,000
2019	Tom's d'Etat	6	Joel Rosario	Albert Stall Jr.	G M B Racing (Gayle Benson)	11/8	1:47.45	$55,000
2018	Realm	5	Junior Alvarado	Barclay Tagg	Eric Dattner, Barclay Tagg, & Harry Astarita	11/8	1:50.02	$55,000
2017	Rally Cry	4	John Velazquez	Todd A. Pletcher	Paul P. Pompa	11/8	1:48.58	$60,000
2016	Royal Posse	5	Irad Ortiz Jr.	Rudy R. Rodriguez	Michael Dubb, Bethlehem Stables LLC, & Gary Aisquith	11/8	1:49.93	$60,000
2015	Bay of Plenty	4	Joel Rosario	Kiaran McLaughlin	Godolphin Racing LLC	11/8	1:48.92	$60,000
2014	Farhaan	5	Irad Ortiz Jr.	Kiaran McLaughlin	Shadwell Stable	11/8	1:49.87	$60,000
2013	Vitoria Olimpica	4	John Velazquez	Todd A. Pletcher	Stud TNT (Goncalo Torrealba)	11/8	1:49.10	$60,000
