= Swiss Skydiver =

American thoroughbred racehorse

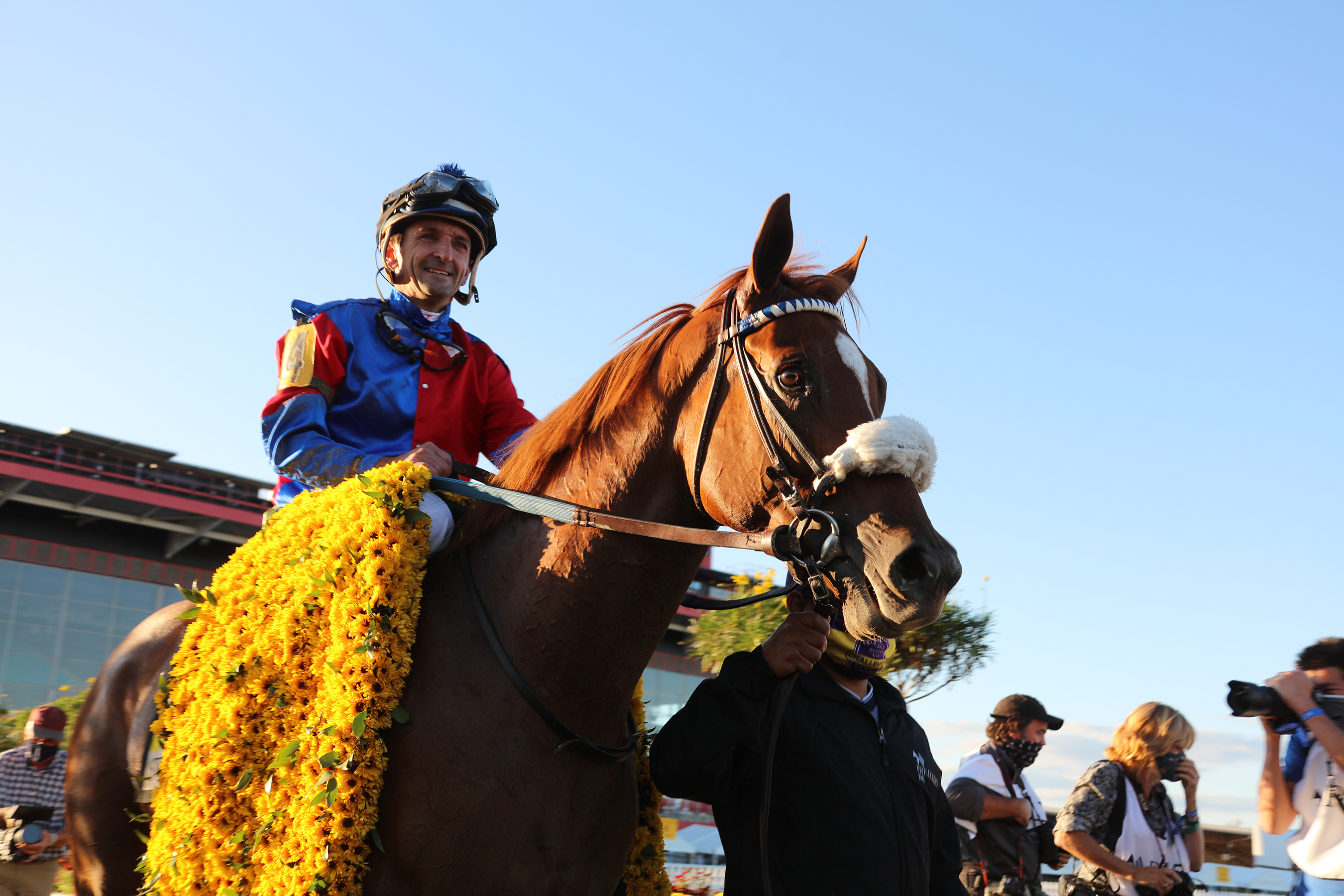
- Swiss Skydiver at 2020 Preakness Stakes
- Sire: Daredevil
- Grandsire: More than Ready
- Dam: Expo Gold
- Damsire: Johannesburg
- Sex: Mare
- Foaled: March 10, 2017
- Country: United States
- Color: Chestnut
- Breeder: WinStar Farm, LLC
- Owner: Peter J. Callahan
- Trainer: Kenneth G. McPeek
- Record: 16 : 7 - 3 - 2
- Earnings: $2,216,480

Major wins
- Gulfstream Oaks (2020); Santa Anita Oaks (2020); Fantasy Stakes (2020); Alabama Stakes (2020); Beholder Mile Stakes (2021); Triple Crown Race wins: Preakness Stakes (2020)

Awards
- American Champion Three-Year-Old Filly (2020)
- Last updated on 8 August 2021

Swiss Skydiver (born on March 10, 2017) is a retired American champion Thoroughbred racehorse who won the 2020 Preakness Stakes, only the sixth filly to win the second leg of the Triple Crown. She also won the 2020 Santa Anita Oaks, 2020 Alabama Stakes, and 2021 Beholder Mile.

== Background ==
Swiss Skydiver is a chestnut mare with a white star bred in Kentucky by WinStar Farm. In 2018 she was consigned to the Keeneland Association September Yearling Sale and was bought for $35,000 by trainer Kenneth McPeek. She raced in the red and blue colors of her owner Peter Callahan, who named the horse after his granddaughter Callie Rasnake who sent him a video message of her parachuting over the Swiss Alps in November 2018.

She is from the first crop foals sired by Daredevil, who recorded his biggest win in the 2014 Champagne Stakes. Daredevil began his stud career in Kentucky but was sold and exported to Turkey in 2019. Swiss Skydiver's dam Expo Gold showed modest ability on the track, winning two minor races from five starts. She is a female-line descendant of the broodmare Cloud High, making her a distant relative of the Belmont Stakes winner Da' Tara.

== Racing career ==
=== 2019: Two-Year-Old Season ===
Swiss Skydiver's first race was on November 16 at Churchill Downs, which she won. She returned less than two weeks later on November 20 to finish second in an Allowance Optional Claiming race.

=== 2020: Three-Year-Old Season ===
Swiss Skydiver started off the 2020 season on January 18 with a 5th-place finish in the Gasparilla Stakes. She then came in 3rd in the Rachel Alexandra Stakes on February 15.

She got her first graded stakes win on March 28 when she won the Gulfstream Oaks. She came in at 9-1 odds and led the race before beating Lucrezia by 3 1/2 lengths.

She then earned her second graded stakes win on May 1 when she won the Fantasy Stakes. She came in as an underdog at 16-1 odds and defeated Venetian Harbor by 2 1/2 lengths.

Swiss Skydiver captured her third graded stakes win when she won the Santa Anita Oaks on June 6. She defeated Meneith by four lengths as the 3-5 favorite.

On July 11, she competed in her first race against male horses at the Blue Grass Stakes. She came in as the 2-1 favorite but was defeated by Art Collector by 3 1/2 lengths.

She came back to win the Alabama Stakes, the third leg of the New York Triple Tiara, by 3 1/2 lengths, establishing her as the top three-year-old filly of 2020 up to that point.

In the 2020 Kentucky Oaks, Swiss Skydiver ran in third place for most of the race before passing the tiring favorite Gamine and just falling short of the eventual winner Shedaresthedevil.

Swiss Skydiver's biggest win of her career was the 2020 Preakness Stakes, the second leg of the Triple Crown, where she was the first filly win the race since Rachel Alexandra in 2009. Swiss Skydiver took the lead on the final turn and battled 2020 Kentucky Derby winner Authentic down the stretch. Swiss Skydiver refused to let Authentic past her and won by a neck. The third-place finisher, Jesus' Team, was 9 3/4 lengths behind Authentic. Swiss Skydiver's time of 1:53.28 was the second-fastest in Preakness history, behind only Secretariat's 1:53.00 in 1973. She became the ninth horse to ever break 1:54 in the 102 years that the Preakness has been run at 1 3/16 miles.

Swiss Skydiver moved up to second in the NTRA Top Three-Year-Old Poll and ninth in the NTRA Top Thoroughbred Poll.

Her next start could have been either the $2 million Breeders' Cup Distaff against her own gender and the champion mare Monomoy Girl or the $6 million Breeders' Cup Classic against older males, where she would have a shot at Horse of the Year if she won. She had qualified for both races, the Alabama Stakes for the Distaff and the Preakness Stakes for the Classic. Her owner Peter Callahan was strongly leaning towards the Distaff, but trainer Kenny McPeek was keen to take a shot at the Classic.

Swiss Skydiver's connections chose the Breeders' Cup Distaff, but she stumbled badly coming out of the gate. She moved into contention at the top of the homestretch before tiring to seventh place. Her stumble out of the gate left her no chance to win, but her connections hoped for a possible rematch with the winner, Monomoy Girl, in 2021.

For her Preakness Stakes win and coast-to coast victories at nine tracks, Swiss Skydiver was a nominee for the 2020 Secretariat Vox Populi Award. In the 2020 World's Best Racehorse Rankings, she was rated 122, tying her for the twenty-first best racehorse in the world and the best three-year-old filly alongside Love and Gamine.

In January, the Eclipse Awards named Swiss Skydiver American Champion Three-Year-Old Filly of 2020. Bloodhorse.com later said she "soar[ed] to Champion 3-Year-Old Filly Title."

=== 2021: Four-Year-Old Season ===
Swiss Skydiver ran her first race as a four-year-old in the Beholder Mile Stakes at Santa Anita Park. She broke fourth, took the lead in the stretch, and won by 2 3/4 lengths in a time of 1:36.18.

After that win, she was shipped to Oaklawn Park for a re-match with Monomoy Girl in the Apple Blossom Handicap at 1 1/16 miles. The third favorite, Letruska, immediately took the lead, while Swiss Skydiver ran on the rail and Monomoy Girl ran three wide. Letruska set fractions of 23.43, 47.96, and 1: 12.26. Robby Albarado let Swiss Skydiver run on the inside, just like she did in the Preakness Stakes. Next to her was Letruska, and on the outside was Monomoy Girl. Monomoy Girl took the lead while Swiss Skydiver didn't fire. In the end, Letruska came back and defeated Monomoy Girl by a short nose while Swiss Skydiver finished 6 1/2 lengths behind the top two.

Swiss Skydiver was intended to make her next start in the Shuvee Stakes at Saratoga Racecourse on July 25, but a two-year-old filly in her barn tested positive for Equine Herpesvirus-1. The barn was quarantined, and none of the horses were allowed to race until August 1.

Swiss Skydiver's next race was the Grade 1 Whitney Stakes against older males at Saratoga Racecourse on August 7. Trainer Kenny McPeek said, “Fillies have won this race before. It's not my first choice, but I don't have any control over the fact that they're not going to let me run in the Shuvee. My preference would be to have an easier race first time back, but the powers that be said that's not going to, timing-wise, going to work. But she's capable of beating some of these horses. Is it ambitious? Yes. But so was the Preakness, so..." Swiss Skydiver struggled to keep up with the front-running Knicks Go and finished fourth, beaten by over 10 lengths.

== Retirement ==
On 9 November 2021, at the Fasig-Tipton November Sale in Lexington, Kentucky, Swiss Skydiver was sold for US$4.7 million, the third-highest price of the sale, to Katsumi Yoshida's Northern Farm. Swiss Skydiver was exported to the United Kingdom and covered by Kingman.

== Racing Statistics ==
Statistics
Date	Race	Racecourse	Grade	Place	Distance	Time	Margin	Odds	Jockey	Ref
2019 – Two-year-old season
Nov 16, 2019	Maiden	Churchill Downs		1	7 furlongs	1:23.93	5 1/2 lengths	3.70	Tyler Gaffalione	
Nov 30, 2019	Allowance	Churchill Downs		2	1 mile	1:38.57	(1 1/2 lengths)	1.60*	Tyler Gaffalione	
2020 – Three-year-old season
Jan 18, 2020	Gasparilla Stakes	Tampa Bay Downs		5	7 furlongs	1:22.80	(6 lengths)	4.20	Alonso Quinonez	
Feb 15, 2020	Rachel Alexandra Stakes	Fair Grounds	II	3	1 1/16 miles	1:43.97	(6 1/2 lengths)	8.20	Brian Hernandez Jr.	
Mar 28, 2020	Gulfstream Oaks	Gulfstream Park	II	1	1 1/16 miles	1:43.54	3 1/4 lengths	9.10	Paco Lopez	
May 1, 2020	Fantasy Stakes	Oaklawn Park	III	1	1 1/16 miles	1:42.00	2 1/2 lengths	16.10	Brian Hernandez Jr.	
Jun 6, 2020	Santa Anita Oaks	Santa Anita	II	1	1 1/16 miles	1:43.20	4 lengths	0.60*	Mike E. Smith	
Jul 11, 2020	Blue Grass Stakes	Keeneland	II	2	1 1/8 miles	1:48.11	(3 1/2 lengths)	2.20*	Mike E. Smith	
Aug 15, 2020	Alabama Stakes	Saratoga	I	1	1 1/4 miles	2:03.04	3 1/2 lengths	1.15*	Tyler Gaffalione	
Sep 4, 2020	Kentucky Oaks	Churchill Downs	I	2	1 1/8 miles	1:48.28	(1 1/2 lengths)	2.50	Tyler Gaffalione	
Oct 3, 2020	Preakness Stakes	Pimlico	I	1	1 3/16 mile	1:53.28	neck	11.70	Robby Albarado	
Nov 7, 2020	Breeders' Cup Distaff	Keeneland	I	7	1 1/8 miles	1:47.84	(8 1/4 lengths)	2.30	Robby Albarado	
2021 – Four-year-old season
Mar 13, 2021	Beholder Mile Stakes	Santa Anita	I	1	1 mile	1:36.18	2 3/4 lengths	1.40*	Robby Albarado	
Apr 17, 2021	Apple Blossom Handicap	Oaklawn Park	I	3	1 1/16 miles	1:43.14	(6 1/2 lengths)	1.90	Robby Albarado	
Aug 7, 2021	Whitney Stakes	Saratoga	I	4	1 1/8 miles	1:47.70	(10 3/4 lengths)	5.90	Irad Ortiz Jr.	
Aug 28, 2021	Personal Ensign Stakes	Saratoga	I	5	1 1/8 miles	1:49.15	(8 1/2 lengths)	4.00	Jose Ortiz	

== Pedigree ==
Pedigree of Swiss Skydiver (USA), 2017
Sire Daredevil (USA) b. 2012	More Than Ready (USA) b. 1997	Southern Halo	Halo
Sire Daredevil (USA) b. 2012	More Than Ready (USA) b. 1997	Southern Halo	Northern Sea
Sire Daredevil (USA) b. 2012	More Than Ready (USA) b. 1997	Woodmans Girl	Woodman
Sire Daredevil (USA) b. 2012	More Than Ready (USA) b. 1997	Woodmans Girl	Becky Be Good
Sire Daredevil (USA) b. 2012	Chasethewildwind (USA) b. 1994	Forty Niner	Mr. Prospector
Sire Daredevil (USA) b. 2012	Chasethewildwind (USA) b. 1994	Forty Niner	File
Sire Daredevil (USA) b. 2012	Chasethewildwind (USA) b. 1994	Race the Wild Wind	Sunny's Halo (CAN)
Sire Daredevil (USA) b. 2012	Chasethewildwind (USA) b. 1994	Race the Wild Wind	Redpath
Dam Expo Gold (USA) b. 2008	Johannesburg (USA) b. 1999	Hennessy	Storm Cat
Dam Expo Gold (USA) b. 2008	Johannesburg (USA) b. 1999	Hennessy	Island Kitty
Dam Expo Gold (USA) b. 2008	Johannesburg (USA) b. 1999	Myth	Ogygian
Dam Expo Gold (USA) b. 2008	Johannesburg (USA) b. 1999	Myth	Yarn
Dam Expo Gold (USA) b. 2008	Clouds of Gold (USA) b. 1999	Strike the Gold	Alydar
Dam Expo Gold (USA) b. 2008	Clouds of Gold (USA) b. 1999	Strike the Gold	Majestic Gold
Dam Expo Gold (USA) b. 2008	Clouds of Gold (USA) b. 1999	Cloudy Colors	Personal Flag
Dam Expo Gold (USA) b. 2008	Clouds of Gold (USA) b. 1999	Cloudy Colors	Getoffmycloud (family: 5-i)
