= 2020 Breeders' Cup Classic =

Thoroughbred horse race

37th Breeders' Cup Classic
- Breeders' Cup Classic
- Location: Keeneland
- Date: November 7, 2020
- Winning horse: Authentic
- Winning time: 1:59.60 (Note: There was a timer malfunction and the race was hand timed by Equibase, originally in 1:59.19. Equibase revised the time to 1:59.60 after viewing additional sources from multiple angles. The time recorded by a different timing system, Trakus, was 1:59.82. In any event, Authentic set a new track record)
- Jockey: John Velazquez
- Trainer: Bob Baffert
- Owner: Spendthrift Farm, Myracehorse Stable Et Al
- Conditions: fast
- Surface: Dirt
- Attendance: — (Note: The 2020 Classic did not have any paid attendance due to restrictions related to the COVID-19 pandemic.)

The 2020 Breeders' Cup Classic was the 37th running of the Breeders' Cup Classic, part of the 2020 Breeders' Cup World Thoroughbred Championships program. It was run on November 7, 2020, at Keeneland in Lexington, Kentucky with a purse of $6,000,000. It was won by Authentic in a track record time of 1:59.60.

The Classic is run on dirt at one mile and one-quarter (approximately 2000 m). It is run under weight-for-age conditions, with entrants carrying the following weights:

- Northern Hemisphere three-year-olds: 122 lb
- Southern Hemisphere three-year-olds: 117 lb
- Four-year-olds and up: 126 lb
- Any fillies or mares receive a 3 lb allowance

The race was broadcast on NBC.

== Contenders ==
The Breeders' Cup Classic is open to up to 14 starters, with automatic berths for horses that win one of the designated "Win and You're In" Breeders' Cup Challenge races. Other horses are ranked by their performances in graded stakes races and by the judgement of a panel of racing experts.

Entries were taken on November 2. The leading contenders were:

- Authentic – winner of the 2020 Kentucky Derby, and automatically qualified by winning the Haskell Invitational
- Improbable – automatically qualified by winning both the Whitney Stakes and Awesome Again Stakes. He also won the Hollywood Gold Cup
- Tiz the Law – winner of the Belmont Stakes, Travers Stakes, and Florida Derby
- Maximum Security – automatically qualified by winning the Pacific Classic. He also won the Saudi Cup and San Diego Handicap.
- Tom's d'Etat – automatically qualified by winning the Stephen Foster Handicap. He also defeated Improbable in the Oaklawn Mile
- By My Standards – winner of the Oaklawn Handicap and Alysheba, along with three second-place finishes in graded stakes races.

The filly Swiss Skydiver qualified for both the Classic and Distaff by winning the Preakness Stakes and Alabama Stakes respectively. Her connections decided to enter her in the Distaff.

== Race description ==
On a very fast track that appeared to favor front runners, Authentic went to the early lead, followed by Maximum Security. Tiz the Law also broke well but was taken back and was never a factor. Improbable broke to the inside, bumping into several horses to his inside. He then rated in midpack until the final turn, moving to within a length of Authentic as they entered the stretch. Authentic responded to the challenge and drew away down the stretch to win by 2 1/4 lengths.

It was the fourth classic win for Authentic's trainer Bob Baffert, and the first for veteran jockey John Velazquez. Baffert had sharpened up Authentic's training after being defeated in the Preakness, telling Velazquez, "The horse you're riding this week is the horse that you rode in the Derby. You can ride him with confidence. You can be aggressive. You can do what you want. And he's just a really top horse."

Authentic became the fourth Kentucky Derby winner to also take the Classic in their three-year-old campaign, after Sunday Silence in 1989, Unbridled in 1990, and American Pharoah in 2015. Derby winners Ferdinand and Alysheba won the Classic in their four-year-old campaign. Authentic was subsequently named the 2020 American Horse of the Year.

Authentic broke the track record set by American Pharoah five years ago in the same race. The teletimer did not function properly so the race was hand-timed, initially in 1:59.16 based on the video and then in 1:59.60 using additional camera angles. Note that races in North America typically have a "run-up" between where the stating gate is placed until the official starting point at which the timer starts (50 feet in this case), which complicates hand timing.

== Results ==
Finish	Program Number	Horse	Jockey	Trainer	Morning Line Odds	Final Odds	Winnings	Margin
1	9	Authentic	John Velazquez	Bob Baffert	9-5	4.20	$3,120,000	
2	8	Improbable	Irad Ortiz Jr.	Bob Baffert	5-2	3.70	$1,020,000	2 1/4 lengths
3	7	Global Campaign	Javier Castellano	Stanley Hough	20-1	25.20	$540,000	3 1/4 lengths
4	1	Tacitus	Jose Ortiz	Bill Mott	20-1	21.20	$300,000	5 1/4 lengths
5	10	Maximum Security	Luis Saez	Bob Baffert	7-2	4.40	$180,000	5 1/4 lengths
6	2	Tiz the Law	Manuel Franco	Barclay Tagg	3-1	3.20	$120,000	5 1/2 lengths
7	5	Title Ready	Corey Lanerie	Dallas Stewart	30-1	66.40	$60,000	12 3/4 lengths
8	3	By My Standards	Gabriel Saez	Bret Calhoun	10-1	16.30	$60,000	14 lengths
9	4	Tom's d'Etat	Joel Rosario	Albert Stall Jr.	6-1	4.20	$60,000	15 3/4 lengths
10	6	Higher Power	Flavien Prat	John Sadler	20-1	43.40	$60,000	30 lengths

Times: 1/4 – 23.20; 1/2 – 46.84; 3/4 – 1:10.32; mile – 1:34.64; final – 1:59.60.
Splits for each quarter-mile: (23.20) (23.64) (23.48) (24.32) (24.96)

Source: Revised Equibase Chart

== Payout ==
Payout Schedule:

Program Number	Horse	Win	Place	Show
9	Authentic	$10.40	$5.40	$4.20
8	Improbable		$4.80	$3.20
7	Global Campaign			$8.80

- $1 Exacta (9-8) Paid $22.70
- $0.50 Trifecta (9-8-7) Paid $167.95
- $0.10 Superfecta (9-8-7-1) Paid $335.55
