= Ellis Park Derby =

American thoroughbred horse racer

- Class: Ungraded stakes
- Location: Ellis Park Race Course; Henderson, Kentucky, United States
- Race type: Thoroughbred - Flat racing

Race information
- Distance: 1 1/8 miles
- Surface: Dirt
- Track: left-handed
- Qualification: 3-year-old
- Purse: $200,000 (2020)

The Ellis Park Derby is an American Thoroughbred horse race held annually at Ellis Park Race Course in Henderson, Kentucky. Inaugurated in 2018, in 2020 it became a qualifying race for the Kentucky Derby with the winner receiving 50 points on the Road to the Kentucky Derby.

The race was contested at a distance of one mile in its first two runnings before being increased to a mile and one-eighth in 2020.

== Winners ==
Year	Winner	Age	Jockey	Trainer	Owner	Distance	Time	Win$	Gr.
2021	Super Stock	3	Ricardo Santana Jr.	Steve Asmussen	Keith Asmussen & Erv Woolsey	1 1/8 m	1:48.89	$200,000	
2020	Art Collector	3	Brian Hernandez Jr.	Thomas Drury Jr.	Bruce Lunsford	1 1/8 m	1:48.02	$115,905	
2019	Gray Magician	3	Corey Lanerie	Peter L. Miller	Eclipse Thoroughbred Partners, Gary Barber, Wachtel Stable (Adam Wachtel)	1 m	1:36.19	$60,570	
2018	Believe In Royalty	3	Gabriel Saez	J. Larry Jones	Robert C. Baker, William L. Mack, Brereton C. Jones	1 m	1:37.96	$43,245	
