= Monomoy Girl =

American Thoroughbred racehorse

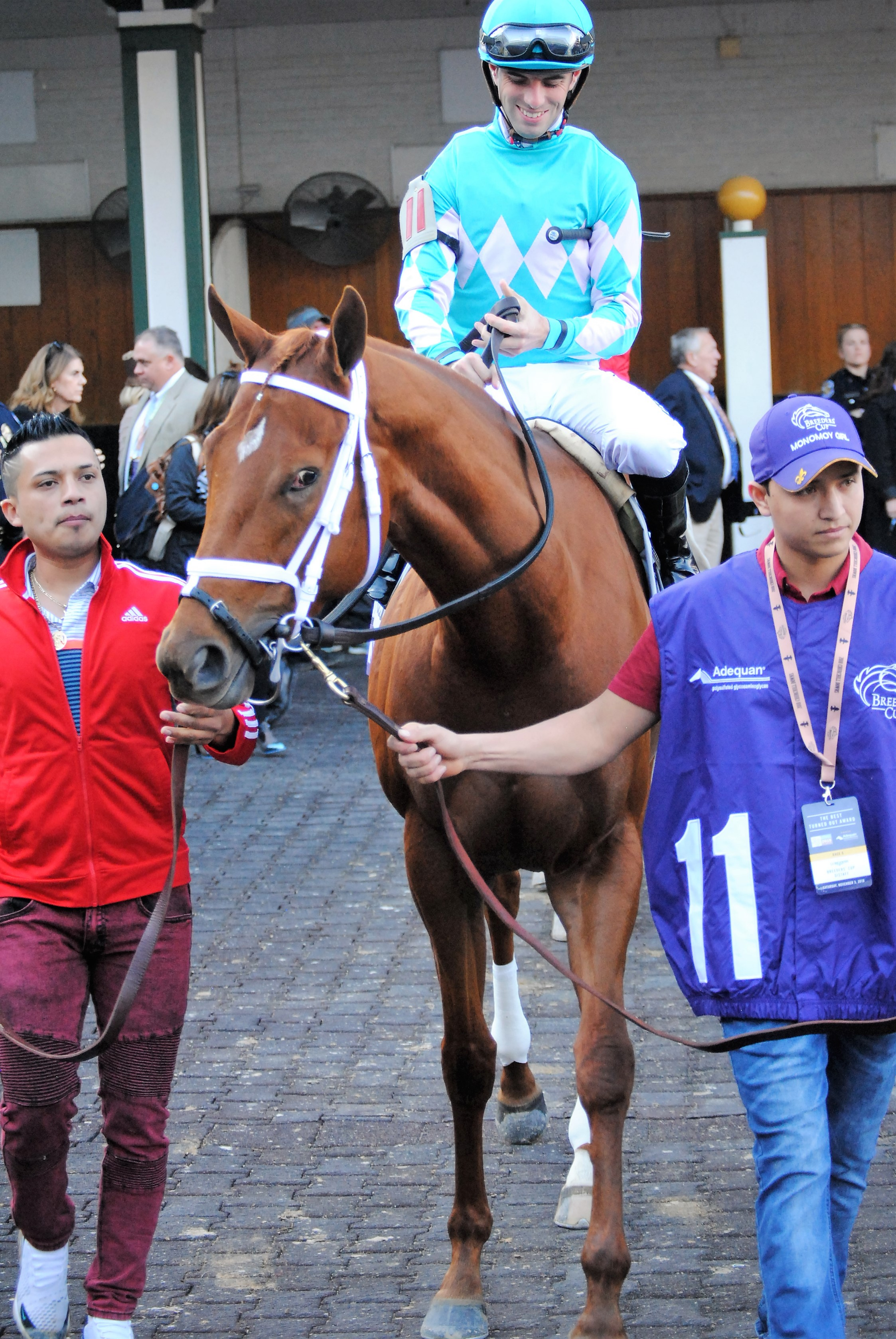
- Monomoy Girl at the 2018 Breeders' Cup
- Sire: Tapizar
- Grandsire: Tapit
- Dam: Drumette
- Damsire: Henny Hughes
- Sex: Mare
- Foaled: March 26, 2015
- Country: United States
- Colour: Chestnut
- Breeder: FPF LLC & Highfield Ranch
- Owner: Michael Dubb, Monomoy Stables, Carcone Holdings, The Elkstone Group and Bethlehem Stables (2017-2020); MyRacehorse Stable, Spendthrift Farm and Madaket Stables (2021)
- Trainer: Brad H. Cox
- Record: 17: 14–3–0
- Earnings: $4,776,818

Major wins
- Rags to Riches Stakes (2017); Rachel Alexandra Stakes (2018); Ashland Stakes (2018); Kentucky Oaks (2018); Acorn Stakes (2018); Coaching Club American Oaks (2018); Ruffian Handicap (2020); La Troienne Stakes (2020); Bayakoa Stakes (2021) Breeders Cup wins: Breeders' Cup Distaff (2018, 2020)

Awards
- American Champion Three-Year-Old Filly (2018); American Champion Older Female Horse (2020)

Monomoy Girl (foaled March 26, 2015) is a retired American Thoroughbred racehorse who was the American Champion Three-Year-Old Filly of 2018 and Champion Older Female Horse of 2020. She showed very promising form as a juvenile in 2017 when she won her first three races before being narrowly beaten in the Golden Rod Stakes. In the following spring, she took the Rachel Alexandra Stakes and the Ashland Stakes before winning the Kentucky Oaks, the filly equivalent of the Kentucky Derby. She followed this up with wins in the Acorn Stakes and Coaching Club American Oaks, but was disqualified to second for interference in the Cotillion Stakes. She then rebounded to win the Breeders' Cup Distaff while facing older horses for the first time.

Monomoy Girl did not race at age four after suffering a bout of colic. In 2020, she was undefeated in four starts including the Ruffian Stakes, the La Troienne Stakes and a second Breeders' Cup Distaff. She was sold at the November 2020 Fasig-Tipton sale for $9.5 million. Her new owners decided to keep her in training and she began her six-year-old campaign on March 13, 2021, by winning the Bayakoa Stakes. She was retired in September 2021 after sustaining an injury in training at Churchill Downs.

== Background ==
Monomoy Girl is a chestnut mare with a white star bred in Kentucky by FPF LLC & Highfield Ranch. As a yearling she was offered for sale at Keeneland in September 2016 and was bought for $100,000 by BSW Bloodstock/Liz Crow. She entered the ownership of a partnership made up of Michael Dubb, Sol Kumin's Monomoy Stables LLC, Carcone Holdings, Elkstone Group and Bethlehem Stables and was sent into training with racehorse trainer Brad Cox.

She was from the second crop of foals sired by Tapizar, best known for his win in the 2012 Breeders' Cup Dirt Mile. Her dam Drumette showed limited racing ability but was descended from My Lady Love, a half-sister to the Kentucky Oaks Winner Heavenly Cause.

== Racing career ==
=== 2017: two-year-old season ===
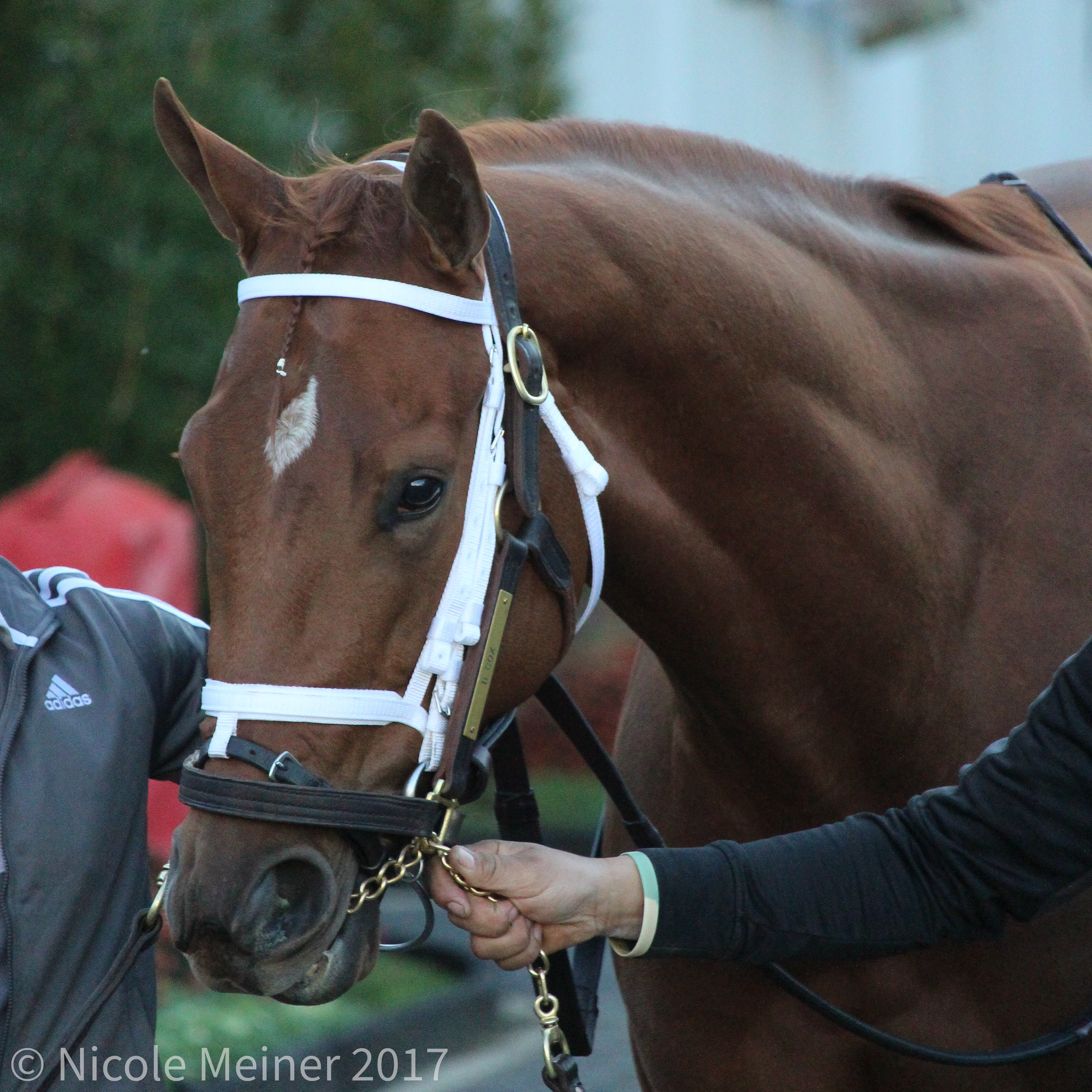
Monomoy Girl in the Churchill Downs paddock before the 2017 Golden Rod.

Monomoy Girl began her racing her career on September 5, 2017, in a maiden special weight race over one mile on the turf at Indiana Grand Race Course as the 3:2 favorite. She broke slowly and was carried six wide around the final turn, but won easily by 3 3/4 lengths. On September 28 at Churchill Downs, she followed up by taking an allowance race over one mile on turf by 1 1/4 lengths.

The filly made her first appearance on dirt in the Rags to Riches Stakes at Churchill Downs on October 29 and started the 3.4 : 1 second favorite against nine opponents. She took the lead soon after the start and drew away in the straight to win by six and a half lengths from Queen Mum.

For her final start of the season, Monomoy Girl was stepped up to Grade II class for the Golden Rod Stakes over eight and a half furlongs at the same track on November 25. She started the odds-on favorite in a field of twelve and went to the front, with Road to Victory in close touch. As they turned into the stretch, Monomoy Girl opened up a lead of 1 1/2 lengths and seemed a likely winner. But she started to weave from side to side late in the race and was caught in the final strides, beaten a neck by Road To Victory.

=== 2018: three-year-old season ===
Monomoy Girl began her three-year-old campaign in the Grade II Rachel Alexandra Stakes at Fair Grounds Race Course on February 17, 2018, and started the 9:10 favorite ahead of Wonder Gadot (winner of the Demoiselle Stakes) and Classy Act. She broke poorly and hit the side of the starting gate, then settled at the rear of the field in the early stages. On the final turn, the filly moved up on the outside, took the lead in the straight and won by two and a half lengths from Classy Act despite ducking to the right a furlong out. After the race Brad Cox said, "She proved herself today... You can see she's still a little bit of a funny filly to deal with, but she's learning and we're lucky to have her. Obviously the Kentucky Oaks is the goal".

In the Grade I Ashland Stakes at Keeneland Race Course on April 7, Monomoy Girl started as odds-on favorite against six opponents and never looked in any danger of defeat. She took the lead from the start and drew away from the field in the last quarter mile to come home five and a half lengths clear of Eskimo Kisses. She became the first Grade I winner for both her sire Tapizar and her trainer Brad Cox.

In the Kentucky Oaks on May 4, Monomoy Girl started second favorite behind the Santa Anita Oaks winner Midnight Bisou. Eskimo Kisses and Wonder Gadot were again in opposition while the best fancied of the other ten runners were Coach Rocks (Gulfstream Park Oaks), My Miss Lily (Gazelle Stakes) and Rayya (UAE Oaks). Geroux positioned the filly just behind the leaders before sending her to the front half a mile from the finish. In the stretch, the race developed into a prolonged struggle between Monomoy Girl and Wonder Gadot, with the latter gaining the advantage approaching the final furlong. However, Monomoy Girl rallied in the final strides to win by half a length, despite hanging to the right. Wonder Gadot's jockey John Velasquez lodged an objection to the winner on the grounds of interference in the straight, but the result was allowed to stand. After the race Geroux said, "When I hit the quarter pole, her ears were flopping back and forth and she tried putting the brakes on me until she saw Wonder Gadot. When the other filly got head-to-head, I gave her a few slaps to keep her interested, but she can be quirky".

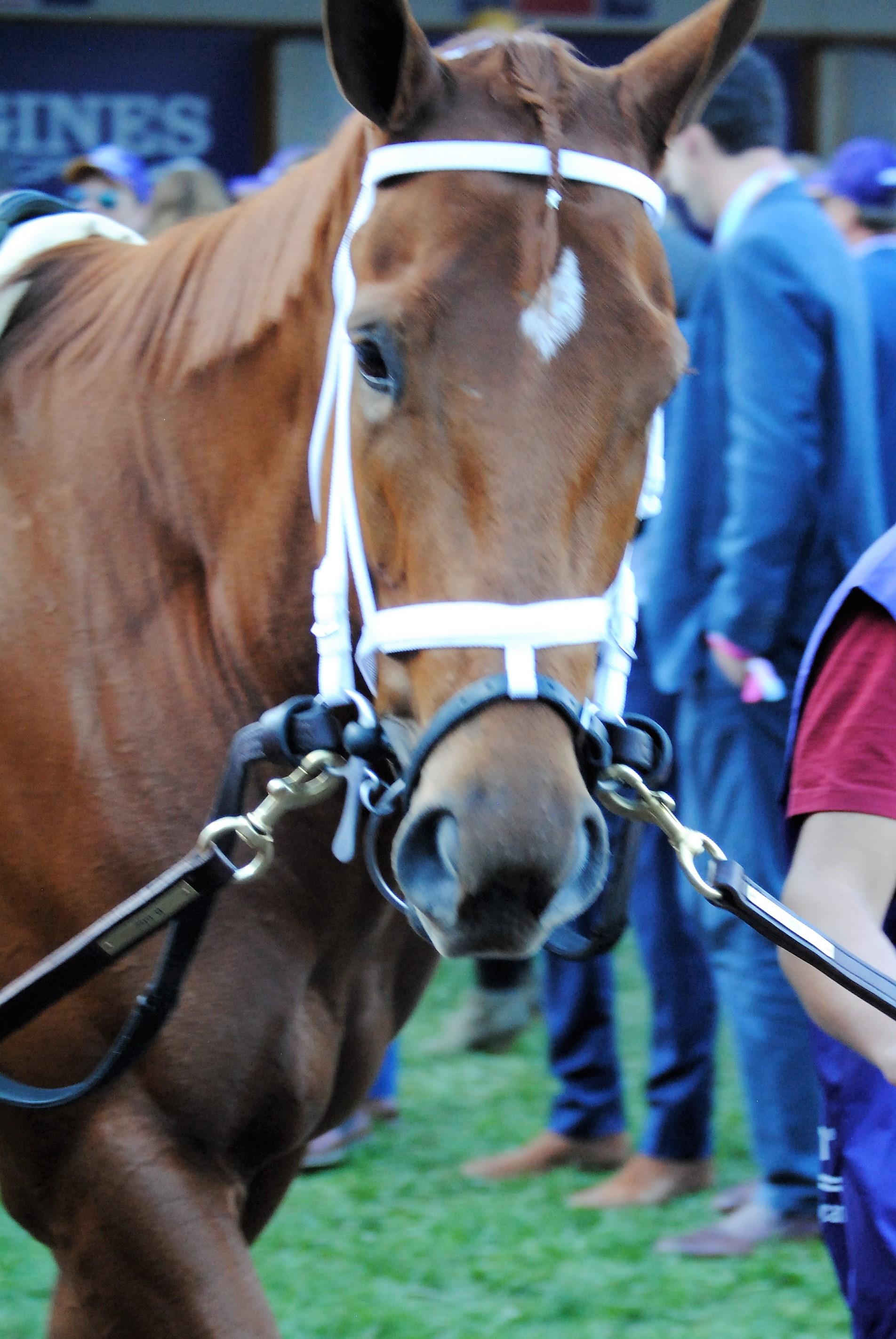
Monomoy Girl at the 2018 Breeders' Cup

Five weeks after her win at Churchill Downs, Monomoy Girl started odds-on favorite for the Grade I Acorn Stakes over one mile at Belmont Park. With Geroux again in the saddle, she won by two lengths from Talk Veuve To Me. "I just had a lot of confidence going into this race", said Cox, noting her growing maturity. "She never gets worked up. You can tell she's just kind of taking it all in. She does look around a lot. That's just her... Nothing really rattles her."

On July 22, Monomoy Girl earned her fourth Grade I win in a row in the Coaching Club American Oaks at a distance of 1 1/16 miles at Saratoga. She went off as the 1:2 favorite in a field of five that included Midnight Bisou, her chief rival in the three-year-old filly division. Monomoy Girl went to the early lead and set a sensible pace. Turning for home, Geroux urged her forward and Monomoy Girl responded by opening up down the stretch for a three length win.

Monomoy Girl made her next start in the Cotillion Stakes on September 22 at Parx Racing, again facing off with Midnight Bisou. Monomoy Girl and Separationofpowers rated just behind the early pace set by Jump Ruler, while Midnight Bisou raced a few lengths further back in fifth. Swinging wide around the turn, Monomoy Girl moved to the front, opening up a 1 1/2 length lead in midstretch despite drifting in towards the rail. Closing steadily down the stretch, Mike Smith on Midnight Bisou first guided his filly to the rail then moved her to the outside to get around Monomoy Girl. As the gap narrowed, Monomoy Girl started to drift again, this time moving out from the rail despite Geroux's attempts to keep her straight. The two fillies bumped near the finish line and Monomoy Girl crossed the finish line a neck in front. However, she was subsequently disqualified to second for interference. "If [Monomoy Girl] only came in the first time", commented Smith, "she probably wouldn't have gotten disqualified, but there were two different incidents. She'll do that, that mare. She'll lean into one. She's a fighter."

Monomoy Girl faced older fillies and mares for the first time in the Breeders' Cup Distaff, held on November 3 at Churchill Downs. The field included champion Abel Tasman (2017 Kentucky Oaks, 2018 Personal Ensign), Midnight Bisou, Blue Prize (Spinster Stakes), Vale Dori (Zenyatta Stakes), Wow Cat (Beldame Stakes) and Wonder Gadot (Queen's Plate). Breaking from the outside post, Monomoy Girl stalked the early pace set by Wonder Gadot then took command rounding the turn, then held off a late run from Wow Cat to win by a length. "She ran the way she was training", Cox said. "She was training like a monster, and she ran like a monster."

Monomoy Girl was named the champion three-year-old filly of 2018, earning all but two votes in her Eclipse Award category.

=== 2019: four-year-old season ===
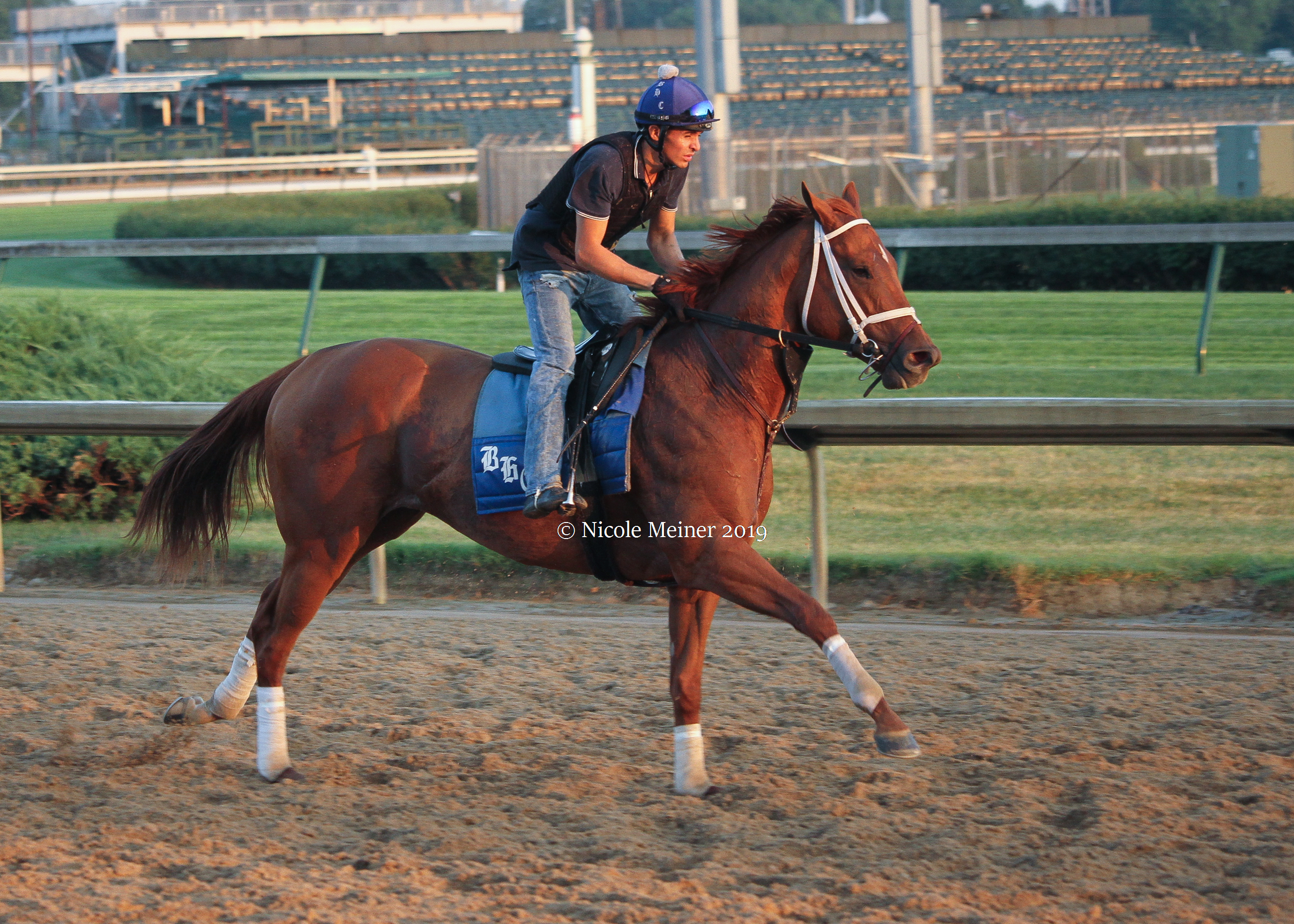
Monomoy Girl out for a gallop in the summer of 2019, after her episode with colic and before her pulled muscle.

Monomoy Girl's four-year-old season was postponed when she arrived at Churchill Downs by van from Fair Grounds with a mild case of colic at the end of March. She was sent to Rood and Riddle and, after several days, to WinStar Farm to recuperate. Originally, Cox hoped to have her back in his barn by the start of May; however Monomoy Girl remained at WinStar until July, eventually being put back into training at the farm. She returned to Cox's barn at Churchill Downs on July 14. She re-entered training in an attempt to defend her title in the Breeder's Cup Distaff, but then pulled a gluteal muscle in a workout on September 7, sidelining her again.

=== 2020: five-year-old season ===
Monomoy Girl made her comeback on May 16, 2020, at Churchill Downs as the 1:2 favorite in an allowance optional claiming race over one mile on a sloppy surface. She tracked the early pace while racing two-wide around the first turn, then went three wide around the final turn. She opened a lead of 4 1/2 lengths in mid stretch, then held off a late run from Red Dane to win by 2 3/4 lengths.

She was then taken to Belmont Park for the Ruffian Stakes on July 11. The mare got off to a good start and ran in a stalker position while racing about five wide down the backstretch and four wide around the turn. She took the lead with a quarter of a mile remaining and won by two lengths under a light drive. Commenting on the short margin of victory, Geroux said, "She waits for her competition. She's not the type who will win by nine or 10 lengths. It will not happen. When she gets beat, it's her own fault because she waits around."

Her next race was the La Troienne Stakes on September 4 at Churchill Downs where she went off at odds of 2:5. Monomoy Girl got off to a slow start and bumped with Risky Mandate as they went into the first turn where she was carried wide. In the final turn, she started her move and moved to the lead in mid stretch, eventually winning by 1 3/4 lengths. "There was a little bit of congestion going into the first turn, but I had a nice outside post," said Geroux. "I was never worried. I was on the best horse and we had a great trip. I just had to push the button when she was ready."

On November 7, Monomoy Girl was entered in the Breeders' Cup Distaff at Keeneland, going off as the even-money favorite. Her main rival was the three-year-old filly Swiss Skydiver, who had defeated Authentic in the Preakness Stakes by a short neck on October 16. Monomoy Girl broke well from the outside post and settled in fourth position behind Lady Kate and Harvest Moon. On the other hand, Swiss Skydiver stumbled out of the starting gate and settled in eighth place. On the last turn, Swiss Skydiver made up ground on the rail while Monomoy Girl circled the field on the outside. The two battled briefly before Swiss Skydiver tired, eventually finishing seventh. Monomoy Girl held off a late run from Valiance and Dunbar Road to win by 2 3/4 lengths. "She's a mare of a lifetime, very rare," said Geroux. "It's like finding a diamond. When you have it, you do the best you can. It's a gift. Even after all she's been through, being off a year and a half, to come back and still be at the top of her game is unreal."

One day later, Monomoy Girl was offered as a broodmare or racing prospect at the Fasig-Tipton "Night of the Stars" sale. She was bought by Spendthrift Farm for $9.5 million, tied with Songbird as the third highest price ever offered for a filly or mare. Spendthrift decided to keep her in training for her six-year-old season and entered a lease-to-race agreement with MyRacehorse Stable, which in turn offered micro-shares of her to the general public. Sol Kumin also bought back a minority share.

Monomoy Girl was named the Champion Older Female Horse of 2020 after her undefeated campaign. Cox also received the Eclipse Award for Outstanding Trainer.

=== 2021: six-year-old season ===
Monomoy Girl's six-year-old debut was postposed when Oaklawn Park had to cancel racing in mid-February due to severe winter weather. She made her first start of the year on February 28, 2021, in the Bayakoa Stakes at a distance of 1 1/16 miles over a sloppy track. Going off at odds of 1:5 in a field of six, she stalked the early pace while racing four-wide, then took the lead at the head of the stretch. Geroux tapped her occasionally with the whip to keep her focused and she won by two lengths.

Monomoy Girl's next start was on April 17 in the Apple Blossom Handicap at 1 1/16 miles, which was billed as a match race against Swiss Skydiver. Monomoy Girl was the odds-on favorite in the field of six, with Swiss Skydiver at 2:1 and Letruska, a multiple stakes winner who had been the 2019 Mexican champion three-year-old filly, at 7:2. Monomoy Girl was away in good order, then stalked the pace while racing in the three path behind leader Letruska and Swiss Skydiver. Letruska set early fractions of :23.56, :47.96 and 1:12.26. Monomoy continued to apply pressure into the far turn and challenged for the lead turning into the straight. Monomoy Girl clearly hit the front with a furlong remaining, and continued to hold advantage until late. However, Letruska rallied along the rail and got up in the final strides to win by a nose in a final time of 1:43.14. Trainer Brad Cox was a bit surprised at the way Letruska came back to win. He indicated that Monomoy Girl did lose significant amount of ground, and she gave Letruska a six-pound advantage (carrying 124 pounds compared to 118 for Letruska).

Monomoy Girl did not bounce back from the race as quickly as expected and on May 8, it was announced that she had been sidelined due to minor muscle pains and soreness in her hamstrings.

== Retirement and Breeding Career ==
On September 22, 2021, Spendthrift Farm announced the retirement of Monomoy Girl. In the statement, trainer Brad Cox said that Monomoy Girl had suffered a non-displaced sesamoid fracture during training at Churchill Downs the previous day.

With earnings of more than $4.7 million in her career, Monomoy Girl retired as North America's fifth highest-earning female on dirt behind Midnight Bisou, Zenyatta, Beholder and Royal Delta.

Monomoy Girl delivered her first foal, a colt by top North American sire Into Mischief, on February 17, 2023. She is scheduled to be bred again to Into Mischief for the 2023 breeding season.

== Racing statistics ==
Date	Race	Racecourse	Grade	Distance	Finish	Margin	Time	Odds	Weight	Jockey	Ref
Sep 5, 2017	Maiden special weight	Indiana Grand Race Course		1 mile (Note: on good turf)	1	3 3/4 lengths	1:42.31	1.50*	118 lbs	Marcelino Pedroza	
Sep 28, 2017	Allowance optional claiming	Churchill Downs		1 mile (Note: on firm turf)	1	1 1/4 lengths	1:37.87	2.00*	118 lbs	Florent Geroux	
Oct 29, 2017	Rags to Riches Stakes	Churchill Downs	black-type	1 mile	1	6 1/2 lengths	1:36.29	3.40	120 lbs	Florent Geroux	
Nov 25, 2017	Golden Rod Stakes	Churchill Downs	II	1 1/16 miles	2	(neck)	1:43.36	0.90*	119 lbs	Florent Geroux	
Feb 17, 2018	Rachel Alexandra Stakes	Fair Grounds Race Course	II	1 1/16 miles	1	2 1/2 lengths	1:43.26	0.90*	120 lbs	Florent Geroux	
Apr 7, 2018	Ashland Stakes	Keeneland	I	1 1/16 miles	1	5 1/2 lengths	1:43.74	0.30*	121 lbs	Florent Geroux	
May 4, 2018	Kentucky Oaks	Churchill Downs	I	1 1/8 miles	1	1/2 length	1:49.13	2.60	121 lbs	Florent Geroux	
Jun 9, 2018	Acorn Stakes	Belmont Park	I	1 mile	1	2 lengths	1:34.10	0.60*	123 lbs	Florent Geroux	
Jul 22, 2018	Coaching Club American Oaks	Saratoga Race Course	I	1 1/8 miles	1	3 lengths	1:50.46	0.50*	124 lbs	Florent Geroux	
Sep 22, 2018	Cotillion Stakes	Parx Racing	I	1 1/16 miles	2 (Note: finished 1st but was disqualified)	neck	1:45.95	0.50*	121 lbs	Florent Geroux	
Nov 3, 2018	Breeders' Cup Distaff	Churchill Downs	I	1 1/8 miles	1	1 length	1:49.79	1.80*	122 lbs	Florent Geroux	
May 16, 2020	Allowance optional claiming	Churchill Downs		1 mile	1	2 3/4 lengths	1:36.51	0.50*	122 lbs	Florent Geroux	
Jul 11, 2020	Ruffian Stakes	Belmont Park	II	1 mile	1	2 lengths	1:34.13	0.15*	120 lbs	Florent Geroux	
Sep 4, 2020	La Troienne Stakes	Churchill Downs	I	1 1/16 miles	1	1 3/4 lengths	1:42.14	0.40*	123 lbs	Florent Geroux	
Nov 7, 2020	Breeders' Cup Distaff	Churchill Downs	I	1 1/8 miles	1	1 3/4 lengths	1:47.84	1.00*	124 lbs	Florent Geroux	
Feb 28, 2021	Bayakoa Stakes	Oaklawn Park	III	1 1/16 miles	1	2 lengths	1:45.02	0.20*	119 lbs	Florent Geroux	
Apr 17, 2021	Apple Blossom Handicap	Oaklawn Park	I	1 1/16 miles	2	(nose)	1:43.14	0.70*	124 lbs	Florent Geroux	

An asterisk after the odds means Monomoy Girl was the post-time favorite.

== Pedigree ==
Pedigree of Monomoy Girl (USA), chestnut filly 2015
Sire Tapizar (USA) 2008	Tapit; 2001	Pulpit	A.P. Indy
Sire Tapizar (USA) 2008	Tapit; 2001	Pulpit	Preach
Sire Tapizar (USA) 2008	Tapit; 2001	Tap Your Heels	Unbridled
Sire Tapizar (USA) 2008	Tapit; 2001	Tap Your Heels	Ruby Slippers
Sire Tapizar (USA) 2008	Winning Call; 1998	Deputy Minister (CAN)	Vice Regent
Sire Tapizar (USA) 2008	Winning Call; 1998	Deputy Minister (CAN)	Mint Copy
Sire Tapizar (USA) 2008	Winning Call; 1998	Call Now	Wild Again
Sire Tapizar (USA) 2008	Winning Call; 1998	Call Now	Carols Christmas
Dam Drumette (USA) 2008	Henny Hughes; 2003	Hennessy	Storm Cat
Dam Drumette (USA) 2008	Henny Hughes; 2003	Hennessy	Island Kitty
Dam Drumette (USA) 2008	Henny Hughes; 2003	Meadow Flyer	Meadowlake
Dam Drumette (USA) 2008	Henny Hughes; 2003	Meadow Flyer	Shortley
Dam Drumette (USA) 2008	Endless Parade; 1997	Williamstown	Seattle Slew
Dam Drumette (USA) 2008	Endless Parade; 1997	Williamstown	Winter Sparkle
Dam Drumette (USA) 2008	Endless Parade; 1997	Mnemosyne (CAN)	Saratoga Six
Dam Drumette (USA) 2008	Endless Parade; 1997	Mnemosyne (CAN)	My Lady Love (Family: 21-a)
