= Authentic (racehorse) =

American thoroughbred racehorse

- Sire: Into Mischief
- Grandsire: Harlan's Holiday
- Dam: Flawless
- Damsire: Mr. Greeley
- Sex: Stallion
- Foaled: May 5, 2017 (age 8)
- Country: United States
- Color: Bay
- Breeder: Peter E. Blum Thoroughbreds
- Owner: Spendthrift Farm, MyRaceHorse Stable, Madaket Stables, Starlight Racing, Joe Manzanares and Rick Marianacci
- Trainer: Bob Baffert
- Record: 8: 6-2-0
- Earnings: $7,201,200

Major wins
- Sham Stakes (2020); San Felipe Stakes (2020); Haskell Stakes (2020) American Triple Crown wins: Kentucky Derby (2020) Breeders' Cup wins: Breeders' Cup Classic (2020)

Awards
- American Champion Three-Year-Old Male Horse (2020); American Horse of the Year (2020)

Honors
- NTRA "Moment of the Year" (2020); Secretariat Vox Populi Award (2020)
- Last updated on July 12, 2021

Authentic (foaled May 5, 2017) is a champion American Thoroughbred racehorse who won the 2020 Kentucky Derby and Breeders' Cup Classic, where he set a new Keeneland track record. He also won the Sham Stakes, San Felipe Stakes, and Haskell Invitational, and was second in the Preakness Stakes and Santa Anita Derby. He was the Horse of the Year and Champion Three-Year-Old Male in 2020 and was the second highest ranked racehorse in the world. He also won the Secretariat Vox Populi Award.

== Background ==
Authentic is a bay horse with a white blaze bred in Kentucky by Peter E. Blum Thoroughbreds. He was from the tenth crop of foals sired by Into Mischief, who won the Los Alamitos Futurity and went on to become a highly successful breeding stallion. Into Mischief is best known as a sire of sprinters, including Goldencents, Practical Joke and Eclipse Award winner Covfefe. However, when bred to mares of sufficient quality, Into Mischief has also sired horses who can compete at classic distances. Authentic's dam Flawless, a daughter of Mr. Greeley, won her first start by 13 1/4 lengths but bowed a tendon in her second start, ending her career. Blum noted that he kept her as a breeding prospect because of her speed. Authentic was the fourth foal out of Flawless and her third winner.

In September 2018 when he was a yearling, Authentic was consigned to the Keeneland Sales and was bought for $350,000 by representatives of SF Bloodstock and Starlight West. He was sent into training with Bob Baffert. His ownership group underwent several changes over time as SF Racing offered shares to other partners, who in turn sold shares to others. In his first race, he was owned by SF Racing, Starlight Racing, Madaket Stables, F. Hertrich, J. Fielding and Golaconda Stables. In June 2020, a majority share was purchased by B. Wayne Hughes of Spendthrift Farm, which stands Into Mischief. A minority interest was purchased by MyRaceHorse Stable, which in turn sold 12,500 microshares for $206 each to 5,314 people.

== Racing career ==
=== 2019: 2-year-old season ===
Authentic made his first start on November 9, 2019, in a maiden special weight race over 5 1/2 furlongs at Del Mar Racetrack. He ran in stalker position just off the early pace, then took the lead as they turned into the stretch. He gradually pulled away from the early leader and withstood a late run by Jeffnjohn'sthundr to win by 1 1/2 lengths. Afterwards, his jockey Drayden Van Dyke told Baffert that Authentic was his favorite two-year-old.

=== 2020: 3-year-old season ===
Authentic made his three-year-old debut in the Sham Stakes at Santa Anita Park on January 4, 2020. He went straight to the lead while setting moderate fractions of 23.87 seconds for the first quarter-mile and 47.94 for the half. Down the stretch, he started to open up on the field, leading by eight lengths with a furlong to go, before he started to weave, ducking sharply in towards the railing at one point. Van Dyke got him back under control and he galloped out for an easy win by 7 3/4 lengths. "I think the noise from the crowd made him react the way he did there in the stretch," said Van Dyke. "His ears went toward the crowd, so I think that's what caused it, but when he got down to the rail, he spooked himself again."

After being successful in his last two starts, Authentic faced real competition for the first time in the San Felipe Stakes, also at Santa Anita Park, on March 7. The field included Breeders' Cup Juvenile winner Storm the Court, another undefeated Baffert colt named Thousand Words, and highly regarded Honor A. P., coming into the race after a five-month layoff. Baffert decided to put earplugs on Authentic to help him concentrate. Authentic stumbled out of the starting gate but soon took the lead, running the first quarter mile in 22.84 seconds and the half in 46.71. Storm the Court was in second, followed by Thousand Words. Honor A. P. started his move on the far turn, but it was too late as Authentic maintained his advantage down the stretch and won easily by 2 1/4 lengths.

The win gave Authentic 50 points on the 2020 Road to the Kentucky Derby, making him one of the leading contenders for the race that was originally scheduled to be run on May 2. However, due to the COVID-19 pandemic, racing at Santa Anita was temporarily shut down in late March and the Derby itself was rescheduled to September 5.

Authentic made his next start in the Santa Anita Derby, which had been postponed until June 2. In his first start at a distance of 1 1/8 miles, he went off as the 1-2 favorite. Honor A. P., who had finished second in the San Felipe Stakes, was the second choice. Authentic had the outside position in the starting gate, and broke slowly and towards the outside. While challenging the early leader Shooters Shoot, he was carried wide around both turns. Honor A. P. started his move on the final turn and hit the lead at the top of the stretch. Authentic tried to respond but tired and finished 2 3/4 lengths behind in second. "I was worried about him having the outside post," Baffert said. "He got parked wide, which you don't want to see, and he got tired at the end after doing some heavy lifting."

Authentic was then shipped across the country to Monmouth Park in New Jersey for the Haskell Invitational, run over a distance of 1 1/8 miles on July 18. This time, Hall of Fame jockey Mike E. Smith rode Authentic. He got off to a good start and went straight to the lead, setting moderate fractions of 23.60 seconds for the first quarter mile and 47.52 for the half. He maintained a lead of about a length for much of the race, then started to widen the lead to 2 1/2 lengths in mid stretch, where he started to lose interest in the race. However, Ny Traffic then started to close ground rapidly. Authentic responded to urging from Smith and managed to hold off Ny Traffic by a nose in a photo finish. Smith and Baffert both felt that the close finish was more the result of a loss of concentration rather than a lack of stamina. "He's a good horse," said Baffert, "and he'll improve a lot off this race. It was the first time he shipped, and he's very immature. He has a kid's mind."

==== 2020 Kentucky Derby ====
Going into the 2020 Kentucky Derby, Authentic was ranked second on the 2020 Road to the Kentucky Derby. Above him was Florida Derby, Belmont Stakes, and Travers Stakes winner Tiz the Law. Other leading contenders included Honor A. P. (Santa Anita Derby winner), Thousand Words (Shared Belief Stakes winner), and Ny Traffic. Several other potential rivals missed the race due to injury, including Nadal (Arkansas Derby – div. 2), Art Collector (Blue Grass Stakes), Basin (Arkansas Derby – div. 1) and Wells Bayou (Louisiana Derby). Because of questions over his stamina, Authentic was third choice in the betting despite his strong speed figures going into the race. On the other hand, several late scratches from the field made it more likely that he could get an uncontested early lead, allowing him to save energy.

Authentic was ridden by John R. Velazquez after Smith chose Honor A. P. He drew the outside post, saddle cloth 18, which made the start critical because he would either have to run hard to get early position or run further than most other horses because he was on the outside. However, Authentic got off to a slow start, whereas Tiz the Law got off to a perfect start and went into his usual stalker position. Velazquez urged Authentic to the lead, running the first quarter in a fast 22.92 seconds while being carried four wide around the first turn. Tiz the Law ran in fourth position and Honor A. P. was well back. Then Velazquez managed to slow the pace down a bit, running the first half in 46.41 seconds and the three-quarters in 1:10.23. Tiz the Law began to make his move on the far turn. The two horses ran head to head into the top of the stretch and Tiz the Law looked to have the advantage. However, Authentic responded to the challenge and drew off to win by 1 1/4 lengths. The finishing time of 2:00.61 for 1 1/4 miles was the seventh fastest Kentucky Derby in history.

Velazquez said he had not been concerned about the pre-race talk regarding Authentic's lack of stamina, noting instead how the colt had responded when asked to run at the head of the stretch. "That's all you ask for a horse, that when you get after him and they give you everything they can, and he did. I mean, he responded. Every time I asked him for more, he gave more."

Baffert was very emotional after the race because he had had several ups and downs over the year, and even more in the minutes just before and after the race. In the paddock before the race, his other Kentucky Derby horse Thousand Words had to be scratched when he reared up and fell to the side. Though Thousand Word suffered no damage, Baffert's assistant trainer, Jimmy Barnes, broke his arm. Then after the race, when Authentic was in the winner's circle, he started to wheel about, apparently distracted by the ribbons on the winner's blanket of roses. He knocked over a couple of people including Baffert, though this time no one was injured. Although his mixed feelings left him unable to fully enjoy the moment, it was a record-tying sixth Derby win for Baffert.

=== 2020 Preakness Stakes ===
After the Derby win, Authentic was brought to the Pimlico Race Course for the Preakness Stakes, which had been postponed to October 3. He got off to a good start, but was bumped by Max Player shortly thereafter. His stablemate Thousand Words went to the front and Authentic moved alongside him. They ran the first quarter mile in a slow 24.48. In the backstretch, Authentic picked up the pace and took the lead by running the half mile in 47.65 while racing three wide. Because Authentic ran wide around the final turn, the filly Swiss Skydiver was able to get through a hole on the rail and moved to the lead, running the first three-quarters in 1:11.24. When they were in the stretch, they ran head to head, sprinting away from the rest of the field. In the end, Swiss Skydiver won by a short neck, with the rest of the field almost 10 lengths behind. The filly ran the second fastest Preakness Stakes in history with a time of 1:53.28; only Secretariat was faster.

"That's a good filly," said Baffert. "He had every chance to get by her. He got beat. He just couldn't get by her. She dug in. She's tough." He later said that he wanted a re-do for the Preakness, feeling he had under-trained Authentic for the event. He sent Authentic back to California and gave him several sharp workouts, culminating in a five-furlong in :59.60 a week before the Classic. "Maybe I didn't have him as sharp as I needed. But I have a great team, and we tightened the screws."

=== 2020 Breeders' Cup Classic ===
Authentic met older horses for the first time in the Breeders' Cup Classic at Keeneland, held on November 7. The field in 2020 was widely considered one of the deepest of all time, including Tiz the Law (2020 Belmont Stakes and Travers Stakes winner), Maximum Security (2020 Saudi Cup and Pacific Classic winner), Improbable (3 Grade I wins in a row – the 2020 Hollywood Gold Cup, Whitney Stakes and Awesome Again Stakes), Tom's d'Etat (2019 Clark Handicap and 2020 Stephen Foster Handicap winner), Global Campaign (2020 Monmouth Cup Stakes and Woodward Stakes winner), Tacitus (2020 Suburban Stakes winner), By My Standards (2020 Oaklawn Handicap and Alysheba Stakes winner), and Higher Power (2019 Pacific Classic winner and second in the 2020 Hollywood Gold Cup). Improbable went off as the slight favorite at 7–2 while Authentic was the third choice at just over 4–1.

After Authentic got off to a good start, he went straight to the front on a fast track that appeared to favor early speed. Maximum Security was second on the outside, while Tiz the Law was third on the inside. Going into the first turn, Tiz the Law was taken back and was never again a factor. Authentic opened up a 2 1/2 length lead going down the backstretch and was able to relax while setting a solid pace. In the final turn, Improbable moved from sixth into second place, getting to within a length of Authentic as they turned into the stretch. Authentic responded to urging to pull away to a 2 1/4 length win over Improbable, with Global Campaign in third.

Authentic was the first horse since American Pharoah to win the Kentucky Derby and the Breeders' Cup Classic in the same year, and only the fourth in history (Unbridled and Sunday Silence being the others). Because there were technical problems with the timer, Equibase hand-timed the race off the video in 1:59.60 (Note: The initial time posted by Equibase was 1:59.16 but this was corrected to 1:59.60 in the revised chart posted on November 11) for 1 1/4 miles, breaking American Pharoah's track record set five years ago in the same race. The time according to the Trackus system was 1:59.82, also a track record.

In his eighteenth attempt, it was the first Breeders' Cup Classic win for Hall of Fame jockey Velazquez. "The older I get, the more emotional I get," he said. "It worked out perfect. Bob said to take him to the lead so he doesn't wander so much and keep his mind on running. It worked out. He did everything I wanted him to do."

"I tell you what, I needed that, didn't I?" said Baffert, referring to controversies that had erupted after several positive tests with other horses. "We really were disappointed after the Preakness; I was sort of surprised. He's a quirky horse, but Johnny really knows him well. He's just getting better and better. I'm so happy for the connections, MyRacehorse, and especially Wayne Hughes."

"This is the pinnacle and we'd like to keep it going, don't get me wrong," said Eric Gustavson, the president of Spendthrift Farm. "But for Wayne, who has given so much to the game over the years... He's been in racing over 50 years and bought Spendthrift in 2004 and made it into a business... For Wayne it's everything and for us, the team at Spendthrift, that's the best part. Wayne has reached the top of the mountain, and we get to celebrate with him."

After his win in the Breeders' Cup Classic, Authentic was led into retirement at Spendthrift Farm.

Shortly after Authentic was retired, Hall of Fame jockey John R. Velazquez said Authentic was one of the best horses he has ever ridden.

== Retirement ==
Authentic was retired after the Breeders' Cup Classic to stand at stud at Spendthrift Farm in Kentucky. It was announced that his stud fee for 2021 was $75,000.

In December 2020, it was announced he was the winner of the 2020 Secretariat Vox Populi Award, an award decided by votes of the general public. The award recognizes 'the horse whose popularity and racing excellence best resounded with the American public and gained recognition for Thoroughbred racing.'

On January 16, the finalists of the Eclipse Awards were announced. Authentic was one of the finalists for American Champion Three-Year-Old Male Horse, Tiz the Law (Belmont Stakes and Travers Stakes winner ) and Nadal (Arkansas Derby [Div. 2] winner) were the other two finalists. He was also one of the finalists for American Horse of the Year. The other two finalists were Improbable (Hollywood Gold Cup, Whitney Stakes and Awesome Again Stakes winner) and Monomoy Girl (La Troienne Stakes and Breeders' Cup Distaff winner).

On January 26, Authentic was the second highest rated racehorse in the world in the Longines World Racing Awards with a rating of 126. Only Ghaiyyath had a higher rating, at 130. In addition, Authentic was the highest rated 3 year old racehorse in the world and the highest rated dirt racehorse in the world of 2020.

The winners of the Eclipse Awards were announced on January 28. Because of his impressive career in 2020, Authentic was named American Champion Three-Year-Old Male Horse and American Horse of the Year.

=== Notable progeny ===
c = colt, f = filly, g = gelding

Foaled	Name	Sex	Major Wins
2023	Iron Orchard	f	Frizette Stakes (2025)

== Racing statistics ==
Date	Race	Racecourse	Grade	Distance	Finish	Margin	Winning Time	Weight	Odds	Jockey	Ref
Nov 9, 2019	Maiden	Del Mar Racetrack		5 1/2 Furlongs	1	1 1/2 lengths	1:03.60	120 lbs	0.60*	Drayden Van Dyke	
Jan 4, 2020	Sham Stakes	Santa Anita Park	III	1 mile	1	7 3/4 lengths	1:37.57	120 lbs	1.20*	Drayden Van Dyke	
Mar 7, 2020	San Felipe Stakes	Santa Anita Park	II	1 1/16 miles	1	2 1/4 lengths	1:43.56	122 lbs	1.20*	Drayden Van Dyke	
Jun 6, 2020	Santa Anita Derby	Santa Anita Park	I	1 1/8 miles	2	(2 3/4 lengths)	1:48.97	124 lbs	0.50*	Drayden Van Dyke	
Jul 18, 2020	Haskell Stakes	Monmouth Park	I	1 1/8 miles	1	Nose	1:50.45	122 lbs	0.60*	Mike E. Smith	
Sep 5, 2020	Kentucky Derby	Churchill Downs	I	1 1/4 miles	1	1 1/4 lengths	2:00.61	126 lbs	8.40	John R. Velazquez	
Oct 3, 2020	Preakness Stakes	Pimlico Race Course	I	1 3/16 miles	2	(neck)	1:53.28	126 lbs	1.50*	John R. Velazquez	
Nov 7, 2020	Breeders' Cup Classic	Keeneland	I	1 1/4 miles	1	2 1/4 lengths	1:59.60 (New track record)	122 lbs	4.20	John R. Velazquez	

An asterisk after the odds means Authentic was the post-time favorite.

== Pedigree ==
Pedigree of Authentic (USA), bay colt 2017
Sire Into Mischief (USA) 2005	Harlan's Holiday (USA); 1999	Harlan	Storm Cat
Sire Into Mischief (USA) 2005	Harlan's Holiday (USA); 1999	Harlan	Country Romance
Sire Into Mischief (USA) 2005	Harlan's Holiday (USA); 1999	Christmas in Aiken	Affirmed
Sire Into Mischief (USA) 2005	Harlan's Holiday (USA); 1999	Christmas in Aiken	Dowager
Sire Into Mischief (USA) 2005	Leslie's Lady (USA); 1996	Tricky Creek	Clever Trick
Sire Into Mischief (USA) 2005	Leslie's Lady (USA); 1996	Tricky Creek	Battle Creek Girl
Sire Into Mischief (USA) 2005	Leslie's Lady (USA); 1996	Crystal Lady	Stop the Music
Sire Into Mischief (USA) 2005	Leslie's Lady (USA); 1996	Crystal Lady	One Last Bird
Dam Flawless (USA) 2007	Mr Greeley (USA); 1992	Gone West	Mr Prospector
Dam Flawless (USA) 2007	Mr Greeley (USA); 1992	Gone West	Secrettame
Dam Flawless (USA) 2007	Mr Greeley (USA); 1992	Long Legend	Reviewer
Dam Flawless (USA) 2007	Mr Greeley (USA); 1992	Long Legend	Lianga
Dam Flawless (USA) 2007	Oyster Baby (USA); 2002	Wild Again	Icecapade
Dam Flawless (USA) 2007	Oyster Baby (USA); 2002	Wild Again	Bushel-N-Peck
Dam Flawless (USA) 2007	Oyster Baby (USA); 2002	Really Fancy	In Reality
Dam Flawless (USA) 2007	Oyster Baby (USA); 2002	Really Fancy	Native Fancy (Family: 3-n)
