= 2020 Kentucky Derby =

Horse race

146th Kentucky Derby
- Kentucky Derby
- Grade I stakes race
- "The Run for the Roses"
- Location: Churchill Downs; Louisville, Kentucky, U.S.
- Date: September 5, 2020
- Distance: 1 1/4 mi (10 furlongs; 2,012 m)
- Winning horse: Authentic
- Winning time: 2:00.61
- Final odds: 8–1
- Jockey: John Velazquez
- Trainer: Bob Baffert
- Owner: Spendthrift Farm LLC, MyRaceHorse Stable, Madaket Stables LLC, and Starlight Racing
- Conditions: Fast
- Surface: Dirt
- Attendance: — (Note: The event was held without a live audience due to the COVID-19 pandemic in the United States.)

The 2020 Kentucky Derby (officially, the 2020 Kentucky Derby presented by Woodford Reserve) was the 146th Kentucky Derby, and took place on Saturday, September 5, 2020, in Louisville, Kentucky. The race is one of the three legs of the American Triple Crown, open to three-year-old Thoroughbreds. The Kentucky Derby was originally scheduled for the first Saturday of May, but the 2020 running was rescheduled to September 5, due to the COVID-19 pandemic in Kentucky. It was won by Authentic.

As a result of Authentic's win, horse trainer Bob Baffert tied the record for most Kentucky Derby wins, at six.

== Background ==
Since 1969, the American Triple Crown has been scheduled to begin with the Kentucky Derby on the first Saturday in May, followed by the Preakness Stakes two weeks later in mid-May, and the Belmont Stakes three weeks after that in early June. Major prep races for the series are normally run from three to six weeks before the Derby. However, the COVID-19 pandemic in the United States led to the shutdown of several race meetings starting in mid-March, which resulted in the postponement or outright cancellation of several of these major preps.

The shutdowns led Churchill Downs to reschedule the Kentucky Derby to the first Saturday in September, marking the first time since the 1945 edition was affected by World War II that the Kentucky Derby has taken place outside of its regular May schedule. Pimlico followed suit by rescheduling the 2020 Preakness Stakes to the first Saturday in October. The New York Racing Association (NYRA) decided instead to hold the 2020 Belmont Stakes on June 20, three weeks after racing in New York reopened on June 3. That scheduling made the Belmont the first leg of the 2020 Triple Crown, and meant that the Kentucky Derby was not the first leg of the Triple Crown for the first time since the 1931 edition.

Due to the COVID-19 pandemic, both the Belmont and Churchill Downs' spring meet (May and June races) were held without spectators. However, Churchill Downs planned to allow spectators for both the Kentucky Oaks on September 4 and the Kentucky Derby on September 5 before reversing course and have no spectators due to an increase in COVID-19 cases throughout the state of Kentucky and the city of Louisville.

Churchill Downs used a new singular 20-stall starting gate for the 2020 Kentucky Derby, replacing the previous arrangement that used a standard 14-stall gate and an auxiliary six-stall gate. The old setup contributed to congestion at the start of the race, especially in the gap between the two gates.

People protesting the death of Breonna Taylor, which happened in Louisville in April 2020, also gathered outside Churchill Downs before the event took place after marching from Downtown Louisville. Hundreds of these protesters had been gathered in Downtown Louisville for 101 days leading up to the Derby. Counter-demonstrators gathered outside Churchill Downs as well.

== Qualification ==
The Kentucky Derby is only open to three-year-old Thoroughbreds, thus entrants in the 2020 race were foaled in 2017 as part of the North America registered foal crop of 20,620. (Note: Horses from Europe and Japan are also eligible for the race, but proportionally fewer of them are pointed towards the Kentucky Derby. The qualification positions available on the European and Japan Roads were not accepted.) The field is limited to twenty horses who qualify based on points earned in the 2020 Road to the Kentucky Derby, a series of designated races that was first introduced in 2013. This point system replaced the previous graded stakes race earnings system.

Because of the disruption in the 2020 racing schedule, major prep races for the Derby were spread out from March to August. The major preps provided the winner with 100 qualifying points, (Note: 150 points in the case of the Belmont Stakes) essentially guaranteeing that horse a berth in the Derby provided the horse remained in form and the owner was willing to pay the required nomination and entry fees. Although nearly 90 horses earned qualifying points, less than 20 of these were willing or able to enter the Derby. This opened the race to horses who had not earned qualifying points, including allowance race winner Money Moves and Mr. Big News, who finished sixth in the Blue Grass Stakes.

== Field ==
Tiz the Law established himself as the heavy favorite for the Derby by winning the shortened 2020 Belmont Stakes, followed up by a dominant performance in the Travers Stakes at the Derby's distance of 10 furlongs. His only career loss was as a two-year-old in the Kentucky Jockey Club Stakes over a sloppy course at Churchill Downs. He faced a smaller field than has become traditional for the Derby, in part because of attrition due to injury on the extended lead up to the race. This has affected horses such as Nadal (Arkansas Derby – div. 2), Art Collector (Blue Grass Stakes), Basin (Arkansas Derby – div. 1) and Wells Bayou (Louisiana Derby). Other horses such as Rushie opted to bypass the Derby and entered other races. The remaining contenders for the Derby included:

- Authentic – winner of the Haskell Invitational, second in the Santa Anita Derby
- Honor A. P. – winner of the Santa Anita Derby, second in the Shared Belief Stakes
- Ny Traffic – second by a nose in the Haskell
- King Guillermo – winner of the Tampa Bay Derby and second in a division of the Arkansas Derby
- Thousand Words – winner of the Shared Belief Stakes

Entries were taken on September 1. The post position draw was held that day at 11:00 a.m. EST.

On September 3, connections withdrew King Guillermo due to a fever; on September 4, Finnick the Fierce was scratched with a foot problem. On the day of the race, Thousand Words was scratched after rearing in the paddock and falling on his side.

== Race description ==
Prior to the race, a bugler played '"My Old Kentucky Home", which was preceded by a moment of silence. Due to health concerns related to the COVID-19 pandemic, there were no paying spectators in attendance. Soon after the Derby ended, the activists who gathered outside Churchill Downs largely disbanded and left the area.

Authentic broke poorly from the outside post position, then rushed up to take the lead, completing the first quarter-mile in 22.92, a relatively brisk pace. He raced four wide around the first turn, then moved to the rail along the backstretch while slowing down the pace, completing the half-mile in :46.41 and three-quarters in 1:10.23. Meanwhile, Tiz the Law was tracking the pace a few lengths behind in fourth place, also carried wide around the first turn. Tiz the Law started his move on the final turn and the two were heads apart at the mile pole. Tiz the Law seemed to have the momentum but Authentic rallied and pulled away down the stretch to win by 1 1/4 lengths. Longshot Mr. Big News finished third with Honor A. P. closing late for fourth. The final time was 2:00.61.

The race gave trainer Bob Baffert his sixth win in the Kentucky Derby, tying the record set by Ben Jones from 1938 to 1952. Baffert gave credit for the win to jockey John Velazquez and assistant trainer Jimmy Barnes, who was injured when Baffert's other horse, Thousand Words, flipped in the paddock shortly before the race while Barnes was trying to saddle him. Although the horse was uninjured, Barnes was taken to the hospital with a broken wrist. "To me, that was the most emotional Derby I've ever been involved in because of what happened during that little time frame," said Baffert. "It was just something."

Authentic is owned by Spendthrift Farm, MyRaceHorse Stable, Madaket Stables, and Starlight Racing. Spendthrift Farms, which stands leading sire Into Mischief, bought the majority interest in Authentic, Into Mischief's most successful offspring, in June. Authentic will stand at Spendthrift after retirement. MyRaceHorse Stable consists of roughly 4,500 people who bought a total of 12,500 microshares for $206 each through an online app.

== Results ==
Finish	Program Number (Note: Due to several scratches, horses with higher program numbers moved closer to the rail.)	Horse	Qualifying Points	Trainer	Jockey	Morning Line Odds	Final Odds	Margin (Lengths)	Winnings
1	18	Authentic	200	Bob Baffert	John Velazquez	8–1	8.40	—	$1,860,000
2	17	Tiz the Law	372	Barclay Tagg	Manuel Franco	3–5	0.70	1 1/4 lengths	$600,000
3	9	Mr. Big News	0	W. Bret Calhoun	Gabriel Saez	50–1	46.50	3 1/4 lengths	$300,000
4	16	Honor A. P.	140	John Shirreffs	Mike E. Smith	5–1	7.60	5 lengths	$150,000
5	2	Max Player	60	Steve Asmussen	Ricardo Santana Jr.	30–1	19.60	7 lengths	$90,000
6	4	Storm the Court	36	Peter Eurton	Julien Leparoux	50–1	27.50	9 lengths	
7	3	Enforceable	43	Mark Casse	Adam Beschizza	30–1	22.90	10 1/4 lengths	
8	15	Ny Traffic	110	Saffie Joseph Jr.	Paco Lopez	20–1	12.70	13 3/4 lengths	
9	11	Necker Island	14	Chris Hartman	Miguel Mena	50–1	49.30	14 3/4 lengths	
10	5	Major Fed	38	Greg Foley	James Graham	50–1	43.30	15 3/4 lengths	
11	12	Sole Volante	30	Patrick Biancone	Luca Panici	30–1	32.10	16 3/4 lengths	
12	14	Winning Impression	20	Dallas Stewart	Joe Rocco Jr.	50–1	50.00	21 1/4 lengths	
13	7	Money Moves	0	Todd Pletcher	Javier Castellano	30–1	13.10	22 lengths	
14	13	Attachment Rate	35	Dale Romans	Joe Talamo	50–1	47.50	23 3/4 lengths	
15	8	South Bend	18	Bill Mott	Tyler Gaffalione	50–1	36.60	25 1/2 lengths	
n/a	~~1~~	~~Finnick the Fierce~~	25	Rey Hernandez	Martin Garcia	50–1	scratched	n/a	
n/a	~~6~~	~~King Guillermo~~	90	Juan Carlos Avila	Samy Camacho	20–1	scratched	n/a	
n/a	~~10~~	~~Thousand Words~~	83	Bob Baffert	Florent Geroux	15–1	scratched	n/a	

Track condition: fast

Times: 1/4 mile – 22.92; 1/2 mile – 46.41; 3/4 mile – 1:10.23; mile – 1:35.02; final – 2:00.61.
Splits for each quarter-mile: (22.92) (23.49) (23.82) (24.79) (25.59)

Source: Equibase chart

=== Payouts ===
Program number	Horse name	Win	Place	Show
18	Authentic	$18.80	$6.00	$5.00
17	Tiz the Law	—	$3.40	$3.20
9	Mr. Big News	—	—	$16.80

- $2 exacta: $41.00
- $0.50 trifecta: $655.90
- $1 superfecta: $7,925.80
- $1 Super High Five: $77,251.20

== Subsequent Grade I wins ==
The only horse in the 2020 Derby who subsequently won another Grade I race was Authentic, who won the 2020 Breeders' Cup Classic and was named Horse of the Year. This may be attributable to the late date of the event and the extended prep season that disrupted normal training routines.
