= Mister Frisky =

American-bred Thoroughbred racehorse

- Sire: Marsayas
- Grandsire: Damascus
- Dam: Frisky Flyer
- Damsire: Highest Tide
- Sex: Stallion
- Foaled: 1987
- Country: United States
- Colour: Chestnut
- Breeder: Glencoe Farm
- Owner: Solymar Stud
- Trainer: J. M. Guengo Rodriguez (Puerto Rico); Laz Barrera (USA)
- Record: 20: 16-1-2
- Earnings: $689,393

Major wins
- Clasico Santiago Iglesias Pantin (1990); Clasico Juan Orlando Herrero (1990); Clasico Dia de Reyes (1990); San Vicente Stakes (1990); San Rafael Stakes (1990); Santa Anita Derby (1990)

Awards
- Puerto Rican Horse of the Year (1989)

Honours
- Puerto Rican Racing Hall of Fame (1991); Clasico Mister Frisky at Camarero Race Track
- Last updated on August 31, 2007

Mister Frisky (foaled April 2, 1987 in Florida) is an American-bred Thoroughbred racehorse who competed successfully in Puerto Rico and California. He was Puerto Rico's 1989 Champion Imported Two-year-old Colt and Puerto Rico's Horse of the Year.

== Breeding ==
Bred in Florida by Newchance Farm, Mister Frisky was by Marsayas (son of U.S. Racing Hall of Fame inductee Damascus). His dam, Frisky Flyer, was by Highest Tide. She started twenty times and won five races. Mister Frisky sold for $15,000 at age two.

== Race record ==
Mister Frisky won the Clasico Santiago Iglesias Pantin PR-III and Clasico Juan Orlando Herrero PR-II. He then broke the seven-furlong track record by 4/5 of a second in winning the PR-III Clasico Dia de Reyes on January 6, 1990, by more than 10 lengths. Next he was taken to the United States of America to compete in the Derby prep races to try to achieve what Bold Forbes did back in 1976. Bold Forbes competed in Puerto Rico during the early part of his career before winning the Kentucky Derby. Mister Frisky scored victories at Santa Anita Park in California. He won the San Vicente Stakes, the grade II San Rafael Stakes, and the 1990 Santa Anita Derby and was considered the early favorite for the Kentucky Derby.

Going into the Kentucky Derby, his winning streak of 16 consecutive races was at risk. No other horse has ever had an unbeaten streak of this length going into the Derby. However, Mister Frisky finished eighth as the post-time betting favorite. Two weeks later, he ran third behind winner Summer Squall in the Preakness Stakes. A few days after the race, an abscess was found in his esophagus. His life was in jeopardy, but he pulled through. It was believed that this lesion contributed to his losses in the Derby and Preakness. Nevertheless, Mister Frisky was named Puerto Rico's 1990 champion imported 3yo colt. He reappeared in August of the next year finishing third in a sprint race at Del Mar. Four weeks later, on August 31, he was a runner up to the previous year's Belmont Stakes winner, Go And Go. He never raced again.

He was retired with a life record of 20 starts, 16 wins, one second, and two thirds with earnings of $689,393. He set two track records and equalled another one at El Comandante race track, including 1:21 3/5 for 1400m. He was inducted into the Puerto Rican Thoroughbred Racing Hall of Fame in 1991.

== Stud record ==
Retired to stud duty in the U.S., Mister Frisky notably has sired Frisk Me Now, a multiple Graded stakes race winner whose victories included the Flamingo Stakes, Ohio and Pennsylvania Derbys, and the Suburban, Widener, Philip H. Iselin and the Gulfstream Park Breeders' Cup Sprint Championship Handicaps. Frisk Me Now originally stood in the U.S. and was later relocated to Puerto Rico. He is the sire of Truly Frisky, Puerto Rico's 2007 Champion Imported Horse. Truly Frisky has won over $300,000 and also won the G1 Clasico Verset's Jet twice as well as other notable stakes in Puerto Rico.

In 1996, Mister Frisky was sent to stand at stud in Australia, where he initially stood for a service fee of A$5,500. He failed to sire any stakes winners during his eight season at stud in Australia. His service fee and his fertility declined, and his last registered foals appeared in 2002.

The Clasico Mister Frisky is held in his honour annually at the Camarero Race Track in Puerto Rico.

== See also ==
- List of leading Thoroughbred racehorses
