= War Pass =

American-bred Thoroughbred racehorse

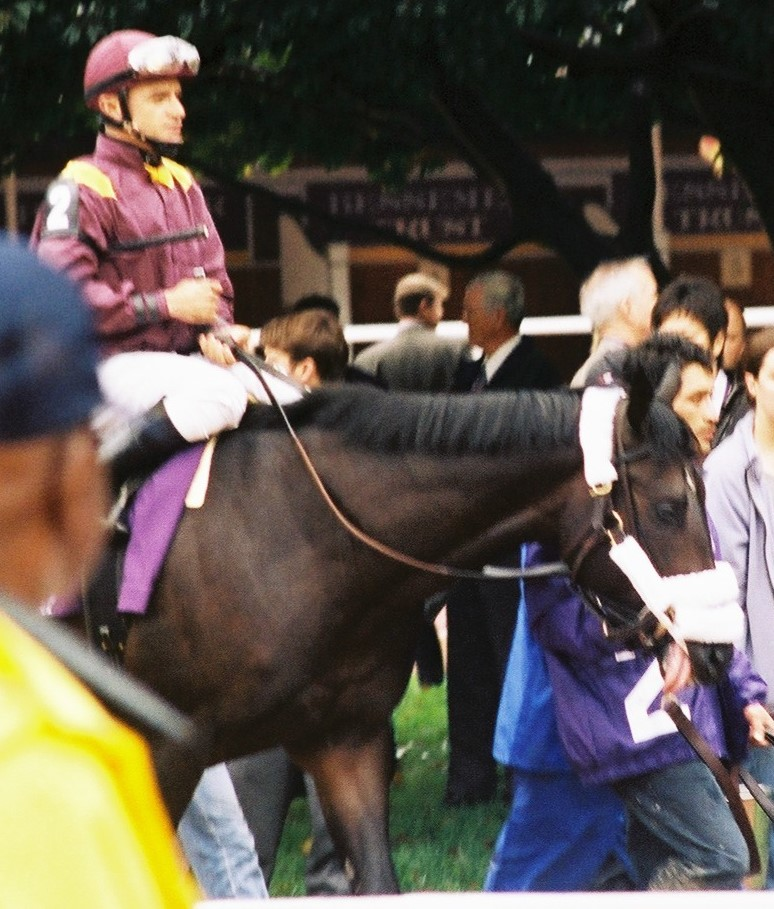
- Sire: Cherokee Run
- Grandsire: Runaway Groom
- Dam: Vue
- Damsire: Mr. Prospector
- Sex: Colt
- Foaled: 2005
- Country: United States
- Colour: Dark Bay
- Breeder: Cherry Valley Farm
- Owner: Robert V. LaPenta
- Trainer: Nicholas P. Zito
- Record: 7: 5-1-0
- Earnings: $1,433,400

Major wins
- Champagne Stakes (2007) Breeders' Cup wins: Breeders' Cup Juvenile (2007)

Awards
- American Champion Two-Year-Old Colt (2007)
- Last updated on January 3, 2008

War Pass (April 17, 2005 – December 24, 2010) was an American champion Thoroughbred racehorse and winner of the 2007 Breeders' Cup Juvenile. Owned by Robert V. LaPenta and bred by Cherry Valley Farm, he was out of the mare Vue, a daughter of the influential Champion sire Mr. Prospector. He was sired by the 1994 Breeders' Cup Sprint winner, Cherokee Run, a descendant of the very important sire Nearco.

== Race career ==
=== 2007 season- ===
Trained by Nick Zito, War Pass both broke his maiden and won a first level allowance race at Saratoga Race Course in August and September. On October 3, 2007, he won the G1 Champagne Stakes at Belmont Park, which as a part of the Breeders' Cup Challenge earned him an automatic berth in the Breeders' Cup Juvenile.

On October 27, 2007, War Pass was the post time favorite and won the G1 Breeders' Cup Juvenile by 4 3/4 lengths over a sloppy track at Monmouth Park. Undefeated in 2007, he was made a winterbook favorite for the 2008 Kentucky Derby.

=== 2008 season- ===
Wintered at Palm Meadows Thoroughbred Training Center in Florida, War Pass started his three-year-old campaign in an allowance race. With no real competition in the race, the betting public made him the 1-20 favorite. War Pass broke to the lead and pulled away from the field with little effort under Cornelio Velasquez. His next start in the G3 Tampa Bay Derby started out in similar fashion, as he was again the overwhelming 1 to 20 favorite. However, he was bumped at the start and never got into the lead. Although he eventually made it up to third in the field of seven, he stopped badly and finished last, beaten 23 lengths. He apparently had a fever earlier in the week, and trainer Nick Zito said that he also sustained some cuts due to the bumping he took at the beginning of the race.

When he was shipped to New York's Aqueduct Racetrack for the April 5, 2008 Wood Memorial Stakes, War Pass had a difficult trip and suffered a cut lip that required stitches. In the race, he took the lead early but tired in the homestretch and finished second after being caught in the final six strides by Tale of Ekati.

Following the Wood Memorial, it was discovered he had a minor fracture in his left foreleg, and was officially out of the Kentucky Derby. Although he made a full recovery, vets concluded that it would be too dangerous to run him again. War Pass was retired to stud in September 2008.

== Offspring ==
On November 16, 2007, it was announced that upon retirement the horse will stand at Lane's End Farm in Versailles, Kentucky.

The first reported foal for War Pass was a filly out of Throbbin' Heart (by Smoke Glacken) born on January 19, 2010, at Calumet Farm in Lexington, Kentucky. She was later named Terri's Pass, and ran 40 times. Notable among his offspring are Java's War, who won the Grade I Toyota Bluegrass Stakes in 2013 Revolutionary, winner of the Louisiana Derby and two other graded stakes races, Galaxy Pegasus, Never Can Tell, Confrontation, and Bondeiger.

War Pass's two best sons in North America, Revolutionary and Java's War, now stand stud duties at WinStar Farm and Colebrook Farm, respectively.

== Race Record ==
Date	Track	Race	Distance	Finish	Time
4/5/2008	Aqueduct Racetrack	Wood Memorial Stakes	1 1/8 miles (1.8 km)	2nd	1:52 1/5
3/15/2008	Tampa Bay Downs	Tampa Bay Derby	1 1/16 miles (1.7 km)	7th	1:44 1/5
2/24/2008	Gulfstream Park	Allowance	1 mile (1.6 km)	1st	1:35 1/5
10/27/2007	Monmouth Park	Breeders' Cup Juvenile	1 1/16 miles (1.7 km)	1st	1:42 3/5
10/6/2007	Belmont Park	Champagne Stakes	1 mile (1.6 km)	1st	1:36
8/26/2007	Saratoga Race Course	Allowance Optional Claiming	6/8 mile (1.2 km)	1st	1:10 3/5
7/28/2007	Saratoga Race Course	Maiden race	6/8 mile (1.2 km)	1st	1:10 1/5

== Death ==
War Pass died on Christmas Eve in 2010 at William S. Farish's Lane's End Farm near Versailles, Kentucky. The five-year-old stallion had just arrived the evening before in good order from standing his second Southern Hemisphere season at Widden Stud in Australia.

The morning of his death War Pass showed no signs of illness or injury. He was turned out in his paddock and died several hours later. Preliminary necropsy results are inconclusive.
