= 2021 Breeders' Cup Classic =

Thoroughbred horse race

38th Breeders' Cup Classic
- Breeders' Cup Classic
- Location: Del Mar Racetrack
- Date: November 6, 2021
- Winning horse: Knicks Go
- Winning time: 1:59.57
- Jockey: Joel Rosario
- Trainer: Brad Cox
- Owner: Korea Racing Authority
- Conditions: fast
- Surface: Dirt
- Attendance: 26,553

The 2021 Breeders' Cup Classic was the 38th running of the Breeders' Cup Classic, part of the 2021 Breeders' Cup World Thoroughbred Championships program, and the fourth race in the so-called Grand Slam of Thoroughbred racing in North America. It was run on November 6, 2021 at Del Mar Racetrack in Del Mar, California. It proved decisive in American Horse of the Year voting as it featured the top-ranked older horse Knicks Go and the leading three-year-olds, Essential Quality and Medina Spirit. The race was won by Knicks Go.

The Classic is run on dirt at one mile and one-quarter (approximately 2000 m). The purse of $6,000,000 was the highest in North America in 2021. The race is run under weight-for-age conditions, with entrants carrying the following weights:

- Northern Hemisphere three-year-olds: 122 lb
- Southern Hemisphere three-year-olds: 117 lb
- Four-year-olds and up: 126 lb
- Any fillies or mares receive a 3 lb allowance

The race was broadcast on NBC.

== Contenders ==
The Breeders' Cup Classic is open to up to 14 starters, with automatic berths for horses that win one of the designated "Win and You're In" races in the 2021 Breeders' Cup Challenge series. Other horses are ranked by their performances in graded stakes races and by the judgement of a panel of racing experts.

Entries were taken on November 1, after which the post position draw was held. The leading contenders were:

- Knicks Go — Top ranked American racehorse after four wins including the Pegasus World Cup and Whitney Stakes. Known for his front-running style, his stamina was the major concern as he had never won at 10 furlongs
- Essential Quality — top-ranked three-year-old after wins in the Belmont and Travers Stakes
- Medina Spirit — finished first in Kentucky Derby but disqualified due to a drug positive. Also won the Awesome Again Stakes in front-running fashion
- Hot Rod Charlie — winner of the Pennsylvania Derby and second in the Belmont Stakes
- Max Player — winner of the Jockey Club Gold Cup
- Art Collector — winner of the Woodward Stakes

The mare Letruska, who had won five straight races including four at the Grade I level, was the only Horse of the Year candidate not entered in the race, instead running in the Breeders' Cup Distaff.

== Race description ==
Essential Quality went off as the post-time favorite, in part because bettors expected a speed duel to develop between Medina Spirit and Knicks Go, who both favored a front-running style. Instead Medina Spirit broke slowly and Knicks Go got off to an early lead. After running a fast opening half-mile in 45.77 seconds, Knicks Go was able to relax down the backstretch. Moving around the final turn, Hot Rod Charlie mounted a drive and closed to within a length at the top of the stretch. Knicks Go then responded by drawing away down the stretch to win by 2 3/4 lengths over Medina Spirit, with Essential Quality closing for third. The final time was an excellent 1:59.57.

Knicks Go became the sixth horse to win two different Breeders' Cup races, having won the Dirt Mile in 2020. It was the first Breeders' Cup Classic win for trainer Brad Cox, and gave him wins in three of the four majors. "Obviously, the race went really well", said Cox. "He broke and was able to establish position early. Once he was able to do that, he's a hard horse to catch."

Knicks Go was subsequently named the 2021 American Horse of the Year, receiving 228 of 235 votes.

== Results ==
Finish	Program Number	Horse	Jockey	Trainer	Morning Line Odds	Final Odds	Winnings	Margin
1	5	Knicks Go	Joel Rosario	Brad Cox	5-2	3.2	$3,120,000	2 3/4 lengths
2	8	Medina Spirit	John Velazquez	Bob Baffert	4-1	6.8	$1,020,000	2 3/4 lengths
3	4	Essential Quality	Luis Saez	Brad Cox	3-1	1.9*	$540,000	3 1/2 lengths
4	3	Hot Rod Charlie	Flavien Prat	Doug O'Neill	4-1	3.2	$300,000	4 1/2 lengths
5	7	Stilleto Boy	Kent Desormeaux	Ed Moger Jr.	30-1	51.5	$180,000	10 1/4 lengths
6	6	Art Collector	Mike E. Smith	Bill Mott	8-1	10.2	$120,000	14 1/2 lengths
7	1	Tripoli	Irad Ortiz Jr.	John W. Sadler	15-1	15.8	$60,000	17 lengths
8	9	Max Player	Ricardo Santana Jr.	Steve Asmussen	8-1	13	$60,000	20 1/4 lengths
SCR	2	Express Train	Victor Espinoza	John Shirreffs	20-1	SCR	SCR	SCR

Times: 1/4 – 23.16; 1/2 – 45.77; 3/4 – 1:10.04; mile – 1:35.28; final – 1:59.57
Splits for each quarter-mile: (23.16) (22.61) (24.27) (25.24) (24.29)

== Payout ==
Payout Schedule:

Program Number	Horse	Win	Place	Show
5	Knicks Go	$8.40	$6.20	$4.00
8	Medina Spirit		$6.60	$4.00
4	Essential Quality			$2.80

- $1 Exacta (5-8) Paid $32.60
- $0.50 Trifecta (5-8-4) Paid $41.95
- $0.10 Superfecta (5-8-4-3) Paid $17.01
