= 2021 Breeders' Cup =

Thoroughbred horse racing event

- 2021 Breeders' Cup logo
- Class: Championship Event Series
- Location: Del Mar Racetrack, Del Mar, California
- Race type: Thoroughbred
- Website: www.breederscup.com

Race information
- Distance: See individual races
- Surface: Turf, Dirt
- Purse: Varies by Race; from $1 million to $6 million

The 2021 Breeders' Cup World Championships is the 38th edition of the premier event of the North American thoroughbred horse racing year. The 14 races, all but one of which are Grade I, took place on November 5 and 6 at Del Mar Racetrack in Del Mar, California and were telecast by NBC and NBC Sports. The Breeders' Cup is generally regarded as the end of the North America racing season, although a few Grade I events take place in later November and December. The event typically determines champions in many of the Eclipse Award divisions.

== Qualifying ==
A maximum of 14 horses (12 in the Turf Sprint and Juvenile Turf Sprint) are allowed to start in each race. Horses can automatically qualify by winning one of the designated races in the Breeders' Cup Challenge series, which provide "Win and You're In" berths in a specified division of the Breeders' Cup. Other pre-entries are ranked by a points system and the judgement of a panel of experts.

On October 27, a total of 196 horses were pre-entered in the Breeders' Cup, of which 46 were automatic qualifiers through the challenge races. A record 56 horses were based outside the United States — 26 from Great Britain, 17 from Ireland, 8 from Japan, 2 from France and 1 from each of Argentina, Peru and South Africa. The post position draw was held on November 1.

== Event preparation ==
Del Mar Racetrack hosted the Breeders' Cup for the second time. Spectators were allowed with appropriate health measures, unlike the 2020 event that was held with only essential personnel in attendance, due to the COVID-19 pandemic in the United States. Specially built corporate chalet expanded the on-track seating to 25,000, with general admission and infield seating bringing the total capacity to 37,500. Del Mar also built quarantine barns to support the large contingent of international horses.

== TV coverage ==
In the United States the Breeders' Cup was televised live on NBC, NBCSN, and TVG, with the majority of coverage televised over both days on NBCSN and TVG on both days. The Breeders' Cup Classic was live and in prime time on NBC.

In the United Kingdom, ITV telecast Breeders' Cup Turf and Breeders' Cup Classic on the main channel and the other races except for the Breeders' Cup Filly and Mare Sprint, which were telecast on ITV4.

== Races ==
The post times for the Breeders' Cup program were announced on September 30 and the official race sequence was announced on October 27. The pools for multi-race wagers (early and late Pick 5, and Super Pick 5) on Friday would rollover to Saturday if there was no winning bet. The corresponding races on Saturday had a mandatory payout. For the first time, the Breeder's Cup ran an All-Turf Pick 4 for the four Turf races on the Saturday card. The handle for the two days set a record of US$154.45 million.

=== Friday, November 5 ===
The five Breeders' Cup races on Friday were exclusively for two-year-olds. Echo Zulu was the dominating winner of the Juvenile Fillies, wrapping up championship honors in her division. Corniche was also an easy winner in the Juvenile and will contend with Jack Christopher, who was scratched from the race due to a minor injury, for the title of champion two-year-old colt. However, Corniche is not eligible on the 2022 Road to the Kentucky Derby as he is trained by Bob Baffert, who has been banned by Churchill Downs from running horses in the Kentucky Derby for two years due to a drug positive in the 2021 event.

The running of the Juvenile Turf was marked by controversy. The favorite, Albahr, reared in stall 2 of the starting gate and fell over, injuring an assistant starter. Once he was removed from the gate, Albahr was inspected by track veterinarians and was scratched for minor injuries. Meanwhile, Modern Games, his stablemate in stall 1, was released from the front of the gate to avoid possible injury and was quickly pulled up. He too was inspected and was passed as sound. However, the parimutuel feed to other racetracks marked both horses as scratched. When the stewards noticed the error, they announced that Modern Games, who would have become the favorite, would be running for purse money only. Single race bets (win, place, show and exotics involving either Albahr (#2) or Modern Games (#1)) were refunded. When Modern Games won the race, the "win" bet was payable on the horse that actually finished second, and so on. Even more significantly, the Juvenile Turf was the final leg in multi-race wagers (Pick 4 and Pick 5). Bettors with a "live" ticket, meaning they had picked the winners of the earlier races, who had picked either #1 or #2 in the final leg were automatically given the new post-time favorite, which turned out to be Dakota Gold (#3). However, Dakota Gold finished fifth, so none of those tickets paid off. If not for the error regarding his eligibility, Modern Games would have been the post-time favorite and the bets with either #1 or #2 would have been successful.

In the Juvenile Fillies Turf, Pizza Bianca won after a last-to-first stretch run that was captured on an on-board camera mounted on the helmet of her jockey, José Ortiz. The filly is owned and bred by celebrity chef Bobby Flay, and was the first winner at the Breeders' Cup for her trainer Christophe Clement, who won his first Breeders Cup race in his 41st start.

Race name	Post time (PT)	Sponsor	Distance/Surface	Restrictions	Purse	Winner (Bred)	Odds	Margin
Juvenile Turf Sprint	2:50 PM		5 furlongs (Turf)	2-year-olds	$1 million	Twilight Gleaming (IRE)	5.20	1/2 length
Juvenile Fillies	3:30 PM	NetJets	1 1/16 miles	2-year-old fillies	$2 million	Echo Zulu	0.80*	5 1/4 lengths
Juvenile Fillies Turf	4:10 PM		1 mile (Turf)	2-year-old fillies	$1 million	Pizza Bianca	9.90	1/2 lengths
Juvenile	4:50 PM	TVG presented by TAA	1 1/16 miles	2-year-old colts and geldings	$2 million	Corniche	1.40*	1 3/4 lengths
Juvenile Turf	5:30 PM		1 mile (Turf)	2-year-old colts and geldings	$1 million	Modern Games (IRE)	n/a (Note: Modern Games was scratched at the starting gate after breaking through. Stewards reinstated him back into the field and he ran for purse money only. As such, wins bets were payable for the horse that finished second, Tiz the Bomb who started at odds of 7.90.)	1 1/2 lengths

An asterisk after the odds means the horse was the post-time favorite.

Source: Equibase

=== Saturday, November 6 ===
Race Name	Post time (PT)	Sponsor	Distance/Surface	Restrictions	Purse	Winner (Bred)	Odds	Margin
Filly & Mare Sprint	12:05 PM		7 furlongs	3 yrs+ fillies & mares	$1 million	Ce Ce	6.2	2 1/2 lengths
Turf Sprint	12:40 PM		5 furlongs (Turf)	3 yrs+	$1 million	Golden Pal	2.50*	1 1/4 lengths
Dirt Mile	1:19 PM	Big Ass Fans	1 mile	3 yrs+	$2 million	Life Is Good	0.70*	5 3/4 lengths
Filly & Mare Turf	1:59 PM	Maker's Mark	1 3/8 miles (Turf)	3 yrs+ fillies & mares	$2 million	Loves Only You (JPN)	4.30	1/2 lengths
Sprint	2:38 PM	Qatar	6 furlongs	3 yrs+	$2 million	Aloha West	11.30	Nose
Mile	3:20 PM	Fanduel presented by the PDJF	1 mile (Turf)	3 yrs+	$2 million	Space Blues (IRE)	2.10*	1/2 lengths
Distaff	4:00 PM	Longines	1 1/8 miles	3 yrs+ fillies & mares	$2 million	Marche Lorraine (JPN)	49.90	Nose
Turf	4:40 PM	Longines	1 1/2 miles (Turf)	3 yrs+	$4 million	Yibir (GB)	8.50	1/2 lengths
Classic	5:40 PM	Longines	1 1/4 miles	3 yrs+	$6 million	Knicks Go	3.20	2 3/4 lengths
