= Frank A. Alexander =

American horse trainer (1937–2020)

Frank Alexander
Personal information
- Born: October 18, 1937 Glen Cove, New York, U.S.
- Died: June 26, 2020 (aged 82) Florida, U.S.
- Occupation: Trainer

Horse racing career
- Sport: Horse racing
- Career wins: 997

Major racing wins
- Canadian Turf Handicap (1981); Lamplighter Stakes (1981); Cotillion Handicap (1984); Carry Back Stakes (1986); Sunny Isle Handicap (1986); Cowdin Stakes (1992); Derby Trial Stakes (1993); Dwyer Stakes (1993); Lafayette Stakes (1993); Pennsylvania Derby (1993); Super Derby (1993); Frank J. De Francis Memorial Dash (1994); Gulfstream Park Sprint Championship (1995); Hopeful Stakes (1998); Meadowlands Cup (1998); Commonwealth Breeders' Cup Stakes (1999); Remsen Stakes (2000); Athenia Handicap (2001, 2002); Just A Game Handicap (2002); Mother Goose Stakes (2002); Violet Handicap (2002); Nassau County Stakes (2002); William Donald Schaefer Handicap (2003); Pilgrim Stakes (2006) Breeders' Cup wins: Breeders' Cup Sprint (1994)

Significant horses
- Cherokee Run, Killer Diller, Nonsuch Bay, Wallenda, Windsor Castle

Frank A. Alexander (October 18, 1937 – June 26, 2020) was an American Thoroughbred horse racing trainer who race conditioned Cherokee Run to a win in the 1994 Breeders' Cup World Championships and earned American Champion Sprint Horse honors. Among his other important wins he won the 1993 Super Derby with Wallenda.

Alexander took out his trainer's license in 1963 and in 1974 opened a public stable in Maryland. He returned to his present base in New York in 1987 and retired after a career of forty-two years having won 997 races.

Alexander died in Florida on June 26, 2020, at the age of 82.
