= Knicks Go =

American racehorse

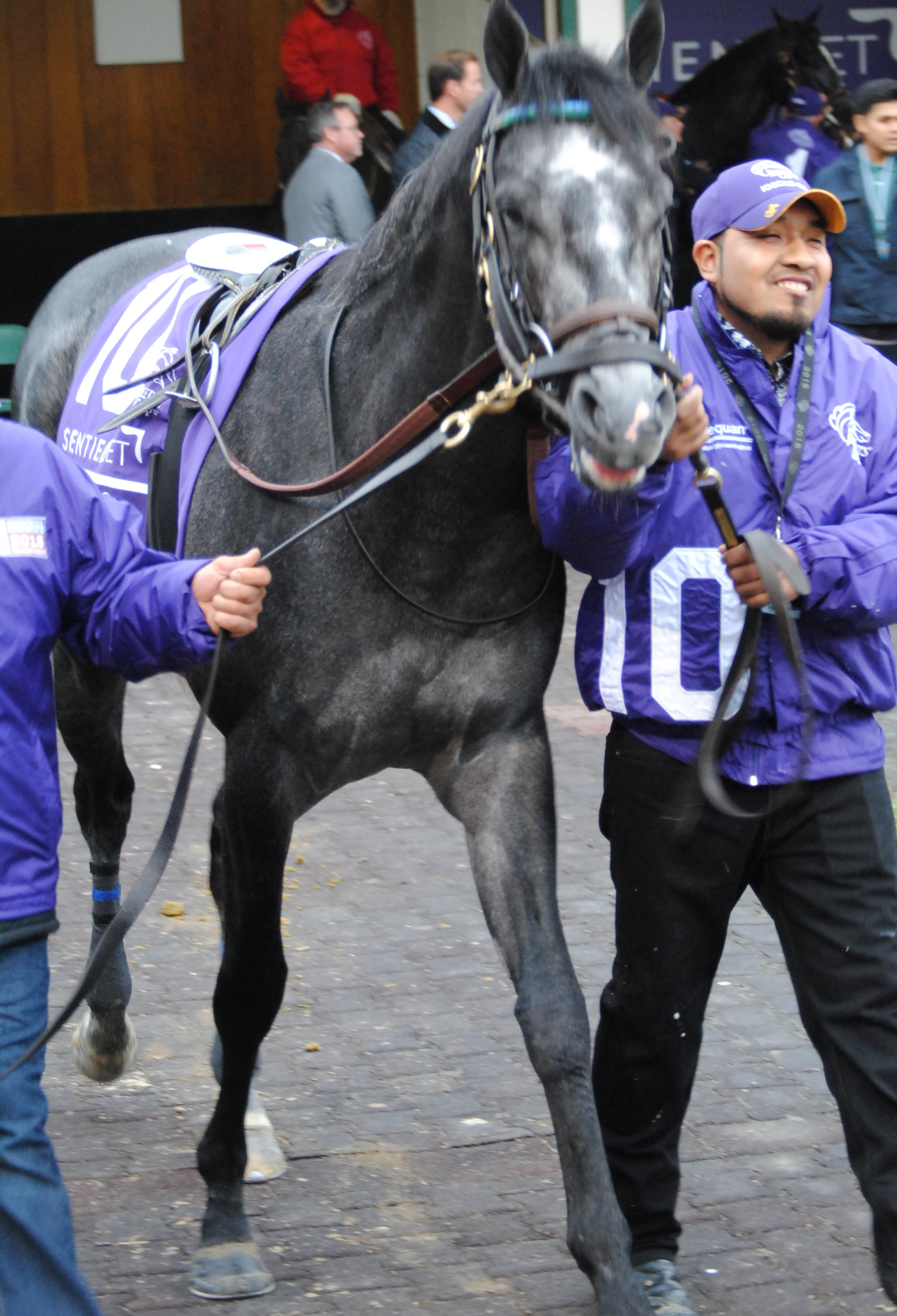
- Knicks Go
- Sire: Paynter
- Grandsire: Awesome Again
- Dam: Kosmo's Buddy
- Damsire: Outflanker
- Sex: Stallion
- Foaled: January 29, 2016
- Country: United States
- Color: Gray
- Breeder: Angie Moore
- Owner: Korea Racing Authority
- Trainer: Brad H. Cox
- Record: 25: 10-4-1
- Earnings: US$9,258,135

Major wins
- Breeders' Futurity (2018); Pegasus World Cup (2021); Prairie Meadows Cornhusker Handicap (2021); Whitney Stakes (2021); Lukas Classic Stakes (2021) Breeders' Cup wins: Breeders' Cup Dirt Mile (2020); Breeders' Cup Classic (2021)

Awards
- IFHA World's Best Racehorse (2021); American Champion Older Dirt Male Horse (2021); American Horse of the Year (2021)
- Last updated on 10 February 2022

Knicks Go (foaled January 29, 2016) is a retired Thoroughbred racehorse who was the 2021 American Horse of the Year after winning five of seven starts, including the Breeders' Cup Classic, Whitney Stakes and Pegasus World Cup. The year before he won the Breeders' Cup Dirt Mile. He is the sixth horse to win two different Breeders' Cup races.

His other wins include the Breeders' Futurity as a two-year-old in 2018, after which he finished second in the Breeders' Cup Juvenile.

After finishing second in the 2022 Pegasus World Cup, Knicks Go was retired to stud at Taylor Made Farm in Nicholasville, Kentucky with an initial stud fee of $30,000.

== Background ==
Knicks Go is a gray horse who was bred by Angie Moore and her daughter Sabrina at GreenMount Farm in Reisterstown, Maryland. He is from the second crop of Paynter, who won the Haskell Invitational, then received widespread social media attention during his battle against a near-fatal case of colitis and laminitis. Knicks Go was produced by Kosmo's Buddy, a stakes-winning daughter of Outflanker who was claimed by the Moores for $40,000 near the end of a 37-race career.

Knicks Go was sold as a weanling for $40,000 at the 2016 Keeneland November sale to Northface Bloodstock. He was resold as a yearling at the Keeneland September 2017 sale for $87,000 to the Korea Racing Authority. He was originally trained by Ben Colebrook and was transferred to the stable of Brad Cox at the end of 2019.

The colt was named for the K-nicks breeding system used by the Korea Racing Authority (KRA), with the "K" standing for Korea and nicks referring to the above average success of certain sires when bred to mares from certain other sire lines. "If you can call him 'K-Nicks Go', that would be great", said Jun Park, a racing manager of the KRA. "But it really doesn't matter. Everybody knows him as 'Nicks Go'."

== Racing career ==
=== 2018: two-year-old campaign ===
Knicks Go made his first start on July 4, 2018, in a maiden special weight at Ellis Park over a distance of five furlongs. He took the early lead and won easily by 3 1/2 lengths despite ducking out when shown the whip near the wire. He then finished fifth in the Sanford Stakes on July 21 and third in the Arlington-Washington Futurity on September 8.

On October 6, Knicks Go went off as a 70-1 longshot in his first start at the Grade I level in the Breeders' Futurity at Keeneland. He went to the early lead and set solid fractions of 23.67 seconds for the first quarter and 47.59 for the half. Ahead by a length around the final turn, he steadily opened his lead down the stretch to win by 5 1/2 lengths over Signalman. It was the first Grade I win for his trainer Ben Colebrook, who felt that the other jockeys had allowed Knicks Go to steal the race. "They didn't give him any respect, and he got out there and just got to gallop," he said. "I could see (Knicks Go) on the backside, his ears were just going. I could tell he was going to run big. But I didn't think he was going to run that big. It was just amazing."

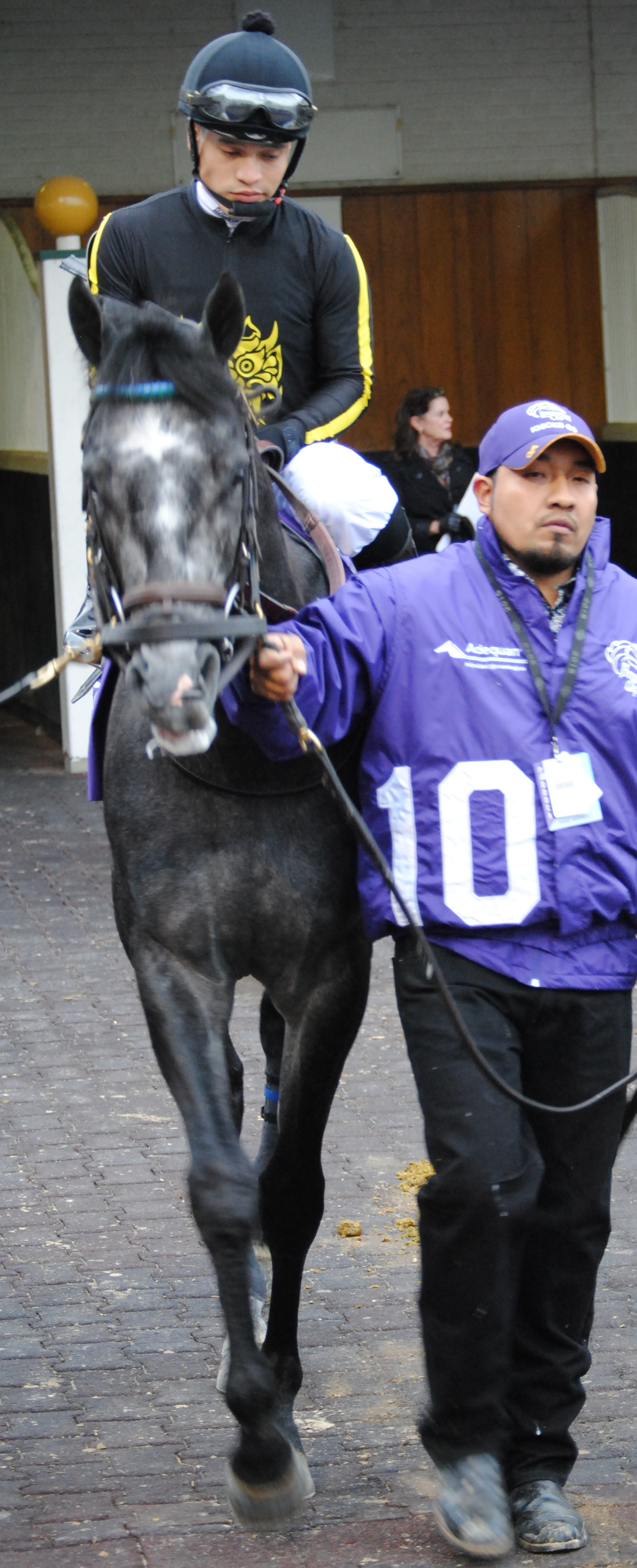
Knicks Go at the 2018 Breeders' Cup

The win earned Knicks Go an automatic berth in the Breeders' Cup Juvenile, held at Churchill Downs on November 2. The favorites were Game Winner, who had won the American Pharoah Stakes in his previous start, and Complexity, who had won the Champagne Stakes. Knicks Go was again a longshot, this time at odds of 40–1. He hopped at the start but quickly moved up to track the pace set by Complexity while racing three-wide around the first turn. Around the second turn, he started to make up ground and took the lead turning into the stretch. However, he tired in the final furlong and started to drift wide. He still finished second to Game Winner, beaten by 2 1/2 lengths, with Signalman in third. "That was a thrill," said Colebrook. "Turning for home, I thought we might get there, but [Game Winner] was the one to beat all along."

Knicks Go finished his two-year-old campaign by finishing eleventh in the Kentucky Jockey Club Stakes behind Signalman.

=== 2019: three-year-old season ===
Knicks Go was winless in eight starts at age three. He was originally campaigned on the 2019 Road to the Kentucky Derby with limited success, finishing fifth in the Sam F. Davis, seventh in the Gotham and fourth in the Lexington Stakes. Later in the year, he finished fifth in the Matt Winn, second in the Ellis Park Derby and fourth in the Super Derby. After finishing second in an allowance race at Keeneland, he completed the year by finishing tenth in the Commonwealth Turf Stakes.

=== 2020: four-year-old season ===
Knicks Go was transferred to the barn of Brad Cox at the end of 2019 and made his first start as a four-year-old on February 22, 2020, in an allowance race at Oaklawn Park. Going off as the second choice at odds of 3–1, he went to the early lead and was never challenged, pulling away in the stretch to win by 7 1/2 lengths. He then suffered an ankle injury and missed several months while recovering. He finally returned to the track on October 4 in an allowance race at Keeneland. He repeated his front-running tactics and opened up in the stretch to win by 10 1/4 lengths. His time of 1:40.79 for 1 1/16 miles set a new track record and earned a Beyer Speed Figure of 107.

==== Breeders' Cup Dirt Mile ====
Knicks Go made his next start in the Breeders' Cup Dirt Mile on November 7 at Keeneland. On the strength of his previous win, he went off as the 9-5 favorite in a field of 12 that included multiple stakes winners such as Complexity, Art Collector, Sharp Samurai and War of Will. He went to the early lead and ran the first quarter-mile in a very fast 21.98 seconds. Down the backstretch and into the turn, he was pressed by Complexity, who closed to within a head after three-quarters of a mile. Complexity then tired, eventually finishing fourth. Knicks Go drew away down the stretch to win by 3 1/2 lengths while setting a new track record of 1:33.85 for the mile.

"He's very fast and he loves Keeneland as well," said Cox. "We picked the horse up last winter and he really loves it here. [Jockey Joel Rosario] did a fantastic job of asking him to be forwardly placed and he responded well. They went very quick and he was able to keep going. This is a good race for him with the short stretch. A lot of things were in his favor today. He's a very aggressive horse, he loves to train. He's just a very classy horse."

=== 2021: five-year-old season ===
Knicks Go began his five-year-old campaign in the Pegasus World Cup on January 23, 2021, at Gulfstream Park. In another dominant performance, he went to the early lead and was never threatened, winning by 2 3/4 lengths. This extended his winning streak to four since being transferred to Cox's stable after a 10 racing losing streak. "We've had some horses we've claimed who have won stakes, but I haven't seen anything like this", said Cox. "I wish I could say why it happened, but I don't know what was happening before. He was great at two and looked like a good horse when we got him."

Knicks Go was shipped to Saudi Arabia for his next start in the Saudi Cup, the world's richest horserace, held at King Abdulaziz Racetrack on February 20. The field of 14 also included Charlatan (Malibu Stakes), Mishriff (Prix du Jockey Club) and Chuwa Wizard (Japan's Dirt Horse of the Year in 2020). Charlatan went to the early lead with Knicks Go pressing the pace in second. However, Knicks Go tired in the stretch and finished fourth behind a late-closing Mishriff.

Knicks Go was given a layoff after returning to the United States then returned on June 5 in the Metropolitan Handicap, a one-turn mile at Belmont Park. He was the odds-on favorite in an elite field of six that included multiple stakes winners Mischevious Alex, Silver State, Dr Post and By My Standards, all coming off wins in their previous starts. Breaking from the outside post, Knicks Go went to the early lead but was carried four wide around the turn. He tired in the stretch to finish fourth behind Silver State. "His last two races have not been good and not what we expected. I'm going to say he's better suited by two turns after them," Cox said. "We really loved the trip. You couldn't ask for a better one. He was on the lead and they weren't flying around there. I was concerned with the one turn, and the combination of that and coming back from the Middle East came into play. I'm disappointed, but we'll take him back home and regroup."

Knicks Go made his next start on July 2 in the Prairie Meadows Cornhusker Handicap as the heavy favorite in a field of six despite carrying top weight of 126 pounds, conceding from 6 to 12 pounds to his rivals. He broke well and steadily increased his advantage from one length after a quarter-mile to 10 1/4 lengths at the wire. He earned a Beyer Speed Figure of 113.

In the Whitney Stakes on August 7, Knicks Go faced another small but "star-studded" field that also included Maxfield, Silver State, Swiss Skydiver and By My Standards. As expected, Knicks Go went to the early lead and set solid fractions of 23.42 seconds for the first quarter and 46.76 for the half. Swiss Skydiver attempted to press the pace but eventually tired to finish fourth. Knicks Go was never seriously challenged in an easy win by 4 1/2 lengths over Maxfield. "The way he was moving he just skipped to the last quarter-pole", said Rosario. "He loved what he was doing. He was very relaxed and going forward. I was really happy with the way he was going turning for home."

The win gave Knicks Go an automatic berth in the Breeders' Cup Classic, to be held at Del Mar in November. Despite never having run at the distance of ten furlongs, Cox felt that Knicks Go deserved a chance at the race rather than trying to defend his title in the Dirt Mile. "I think with the Classic being at Del Mar, it gives you a little more confidence about trying the mile and a quarter as opposed to say Churchill Downs where there's a little longer stretch", said Cox. "He does have speed and that's his weapon which was on full display today."

Knicks Go prepared for the Breeders' Cup in the Lukas Classic at Churchill Downs on October 2. He went to the early lead and set a relatively moderate pace of 47.57 for the half-mile. Independence Hall tried to press the pace but could not respond when Knicks Go kicked away in the final furlong, eventually winning by four lengths. He completed the 1 1/8 miles in a new stakes record of 1:47.85.

==== Breeders' Cup Classic ====
Knicks Go was the morning line favorite for the Breeders' Cup Classic at Del Mar Racetrack on November 5. The field of eight also featured the three leading three-year-olds in the country, Essential Quality, Medina Spirit and Hot Rod Charlie. By post time, the odds on Knicks Go had drifted out to 3–1, reflecting bettors' concerns over a possible speed duel with Medina Spirit, and doubts about his stamina given he had never raced at a distance of 1 1/4 miles. However, the speed duel never materialized after Medina Spirit broke sluggishly. Knicks Go went to the early lead and set an honest pace of 23.16 seconds for the first quarter-mile, then picked up the pace around the first turn to complete the half in a fast 45.77. He relaxed down the back stretch and final turn, completing the mile in 1:35.29. He was briefly challenged by Hot Rod Charlie after swinging wide near the head of the stretch, but then drew off to win by 2 3/4 lengths. His time for the ten furlongs was an excellent 1:59.57.

Cox pointed out that Knicks Go's early speed gave him a tactical advantage. "I kind of felt like if they did try to go with him, they may jeopardize their own opportunity to win the race", he said. "Speed's very dangerous and he was obviously fit, ready to run, happy, doing well."

The win made Knicks Go just the sixth horse to win two different Breeders' Cup races. He was named the American Horse of the Year when the Eclipse Awards were announced in February 2022. He was also named the American Champion Older Male Dirt Horse.

=== 2022: Pegasus World Cup ===
After the Breeders Cup, Knicks Go was kept in training for the 2022 Pegasus World Cup, held on January 29. His main rival was expected to be Life Is Good, who had won the Breeders' Cup Dirt Mile and was stretching out to 1 1/8 miles for the first time. Knicks Go drew the inside post position and was expected to contend for the early lead to establish position. Instead, Life Is Good got a better break and went to the front and moved over to the rail. Knicks Go bumped with another horse when trying to move to the outside and lost ground. Life is Good opened up a comfortable lead down the backstretch and Knicks Go was unable to mount a serious challenge, finishing second by 3 1/4 lengths.

== Statistics ==
Date	Age	Distance	Race	Grade	Track	Odds	Field	Finish	Winning Time	Winning (Losing) Margin	Jockey	Ref
Jul 4, 2018	2	5 furlongs	Maiden Special Weight	Maiden	Ellis Park	1.60	5	1	:57.96	3 1/2 lengths	James Graham	
Jul 21, 2018	2	6 furlongs	Sanford Stakes	III	Saratoga	17.00	7	5	1:10.35	(9 1/2 lengths)	Luis Saez	
Sep 8, 2018	2	7 furlongs (Note: All weather track surface)	Arlington-Washington Futurity	listed	Arlington	12.20	7	3	1:25.20	(5 lengths)	Christoper Emigh	
Oct 6, 2018	2	1 1/16 miles	Breeders' Futurity	I	Keeneland	70.00	13	1	1:44.23	5 1/2 lengths	Albin Jiminez	
Nov 2, 2018	2	1 1/16 miles	Breeders' Cup Juvenile	I	Churchill Downs	40.50	13	2	1:43.67	(2 1/2 lengths)	Albin Jiminez	
Nov 24, 2018	2	1 1/16 miles (Note: Sloppy track condition)	Kentucky Jockey Club Stakes	II	Churchill Downs	3.10*	14	11	1:45.29	(18 3/4 lengths)	Albin Jiminez	
Feb 9, 2019	3	1 1/16 miles	Sam F. Davis Stakes	III	Tampa Bay Downs	1.90*	9	5	1:42.70	(13 lengths)	Albin Jiminez	
Mar 9, 2019	3	1 mile	Gotham Stakes	III	Aqueduct	20.40	8	7	1:35.63	(51 lengths)	Jose Lezcano	
Apr 13, 2019	3	1 1/16 miles	Lexington Stakes	III	Keeneland	17.10	10	4	1:44.14	(8 lengths)	Albin Jimenez	
Jun 15, 2019	3	1 1/16 miles	Matt Winn Stakes	III	Churchill Downs	17.00	7	5	1:42.28	(9 1/4 lengths)	Tyler Gaffalione	
Aug 11, 2019	3	1 mile	Ellis Park Derby	black-type	Ellis Park	6.40	7	2	1:36.19	(1/2 length)	Gabriel Saez	
Sep 7, 2019	3	1 1/16 miles	Super Derby	III	Louisiana Downs	0.90*	10	4	1:43.70	(9 1/4 lengths)	Colby Hernandez	
Oct 4, 2019	3	7 furlongs	Allowance		Keeneland	3.60	7	2	1:22.63	(4 1/2 lengths)	Corey Lanerie	
Nov 9, 2019	3	1 1/16 miles (Note: On good turf)	Commonwealth Turf Stakes	III	Churchill Downs	21.90	11	10	1:45.51	(4 1/2 lengths)	Gabriel Saez	
Feb 22, 2020	4	1 1/16 miles	Allowance optional claiming		Oaklawn Park	3.00	9	1	1:42.57	7 1/2 lengths	Joseph Talamo	
Oct 4, 2020	4	1 1/16 miles	Allowance optional claiming		Keeneland	0.80*	6	1	1:40.79 (Note: New track record)	10 1/4 lengths	Joel Rosario	
Nov 7, 2020	4	1 mile	Breeders' Cup Dirt Mile	I	Keeneland	0.80*	12	1	1:33.85 (Note: New track record)	3 1/2 lengths	Joel Rosario	
Jan 23, 2021	5	1 1/8 miles	Pegasus World Cup	I	Gulfstream Park	1.30*	12	1	1:47.89	2 3/4 lengths	Joel Rosario	
Feb 20, 2021	5	1,800 meters roughly 1 1/8 miles	Saudi Cup	I	King Abdulaziz	n/a (Note: Wagering is not allowed in Saudi Arabia. In British wagering, Knicks Go was the 7/4 favorite.)	14	4	1:49.59	(8 1/2 lengths)	Joel Rosario	
Jun 5, 2021	5	1 mile	Metropolitan Handicap	I	Belmont Park	0.80*	6	4	1:35.45	(3 1/4 lengths)	Joel Rosario	
Jul 2, 2021	5	1 1/8 miles	Prairie Meadows Cornhusker Handicap	III	Prairie Meadows	0.60*	6	1	1:47.33	10 1/4 lengths	Joel Rosario	
Aug 7, 2021	5	1 1/8 miles	Whitney Stakes	I	Saratoga	1.05*	5	1	1:47.70	4 1/2 lengths	Joel Rosario	
Oct 2, 2021	5	1 1/8 miles	Lukas Classic Stakes	III	Churchill Downs	0.10*	6	1	1:47.85	4 lengths	Joel Rosario	
Nov 6, 2021	5	1 1/4 miles	Breeders' Cup Classic	I	Del Mar	3.20	8	1	1:59.57	2 3/4 lengths	Joel Rosario	
Jan 29, 2022	6	1 1/8 miles	Pegasus World Cup	I	Gulfstream Park	0.90	9	2	1:48.91	(3 1/4 lengths)	Joel Rosario	

An asterisk after the odds means Knicks Go was the post-time favorite.

== Retirement ==
Knicks Go was retired to stud at Taylor Made Stallions for an initial fee of $30,000. His first foals came of racing age in 2025, and included Saratoga Special Stakes winner Ewing. At the end of 2025, the Korea Racing Authority announced that Knicks Go would be relocated to their farm on Jeju Island beginning in 2026.

== Pedigree ==
Pedigree of Knicks Go, gray horse, foaled January 29, 2016
Sire Paynter	Awesome Again	Deputy Minister	Vice Regent
Sire Paynter	Awesome Again	Deputy Minister	Mint Copy
Sire Paynter	Awesome Again	Primal Force	Blushing Groom
Sire Paynter	Awesome Again	Primal Force	Prime Prospect
Sire Paynter	Tizso	Cee's Tizzy	Relaunch
Sire Paynter	Tizso	Cee's Tizzy	Tizly
Sire Paynter	Tizso	Cee's Song	Seattle Song
Sire Paynter	Tizso	Cee's Song	Lonely Dancer
Dam Kosmo's Buddy	Outflanker	Danzig	Northern Dancer
Dam Kosmo's Buddy	Outflanker	Danzig	Pas de Nom
Dam Kosmo's Buddy	Outflanker	Lassie's Lady	Alydar
Dam Kosmo's Buddy	Outflanker	Lassie's Lady	Lassie Dear
Dam Kosmo's Buddy	Vaulted	Allen's Prospect	Mr. Prospector
Dam Kosmo's Buddy	Vaulted	Allen's Prospect	Change Water
Dam Kosmo's Buddy	Vaulted	Aube d'Or	Medaille d'Or
Dam Kosmo's Buddy	Vaulted	Aube d'Or	Cloudy and Warm (family 1-w)
