= Frisk Me Now =

American-bred Thoroughbred racehorse

- Sire: Mister Frisky
- Grandsire: Marsayas
- Dam: Slew Me Now
- Damsire: Tsunami Slew
- Sex: Stallion
- Foaled: 1994
- Country: United States
- Colour: Bay
- Breeder: Farnsworth Farms
- Owner: Carol R. Dender (racing); later syndicated
- Trainer: Robert J. Durso
- Record: 36: 12-5-6
- Earnings: $1,727,707

Major wins
- Flamingo Stakes (1997); Ohio Derby (1997); Pennsylvania Derby (1997); Suburban Handicap (1998); Widener Handicap (1998); Philip H. Iselin Handicap (1999); Gulfstream Park Sprint Championship Handicap (1999)
- Last updated on September 26, 2008

Frisk Me Now (foaled April 2, 1994 in Florida) is an American-bred Thoroughbred racehorse a multiple Graded stakes race winner whose victories include the Flamingo Stakes, Ohio and Pennsylvania Derbys, and the Suburban, Widener, Philip H. Iselin Handicap and the Gulfstream Park Sprint Championship Handicaps.

Retired to stud, Frisk Me Now originally stood in the United States and has since been relocated to Pot. Hermosura Inc., P.R. in Puerto Rico. Frisk Me Now is the sire of Truly Frisky, Puerto Rico's 2007 Champion Imported Horse. Truly Frisky has won over $300,000 and also won the G1 Clasico Verset’s Jet twice as well as other notable stakes in Puerto Rico.
