= Taylor Made Farm =

Thoroughbred racehorse breeding farm in Jessamine County, Kentucky, U.S.

- A foal and a broodmare at Taylor Made Farm
- Type: Thoroughbred breeding and sales
- Founded: 1976
- Founder: Duncan Taylor & Mike Shannon
- Headquarters: Nicholasville, Kentucky
- Key people: Duncan Taylor: founder, President, CEO Ben Taylor: Vice President of Taylor Made Stallions Frank Taylor: Vice President of Boarding Operations Pat Payne: Vice President of Sales Mark Taylor: Vice President of Marketing and Public Sales Operations

Taylor Made Farm is a 1,600-acre Thoroughbred racehorse breeding farm in Jessamine County, Kentucky, and is a leading consignor of Thoroughbred horses. The farm is owned and operated by four brothers, Duncan, Ben, Frank and Mark Taylor with their long time family friend and business associate Pat Payne becoming a partner in 2008.

== History ==
Taylor Made was founded in 1976 by then-19-year-old Duncan Taylor and his business partner Mike Shannon as a broodmare boarding farm, and initially was located on a parcel of leased land on Gainesway Farm. Gainesway Farm used Taylor Made as a place to board mares that traveled to Kentucky to be bred. The Taylor brothers, Duncan, Ben, Frank, and Mark grew up living and working on Gainesway Farm with their father, Joe Taylor, the farm's manager, and also learned about the horse business from their grandfather.

In 1978, the business broadened to include sales when they consigned horses at the Keeneland Sales. By 2012, Taylor Made was consigning approximately 10% of the Keeneland's September yearling sale−about 345 yearlings out of the entire sales catalog of 3,604.

As Taylor Made grew, the horses were kept on leased property and barns throughout Central Kentucky. They expanded into sales consignments and then built their own facility on a 120-acre piece of property owned by Joe Taylor on Union Mill Road in Nicholasville, Kentucky.

== Operation ==
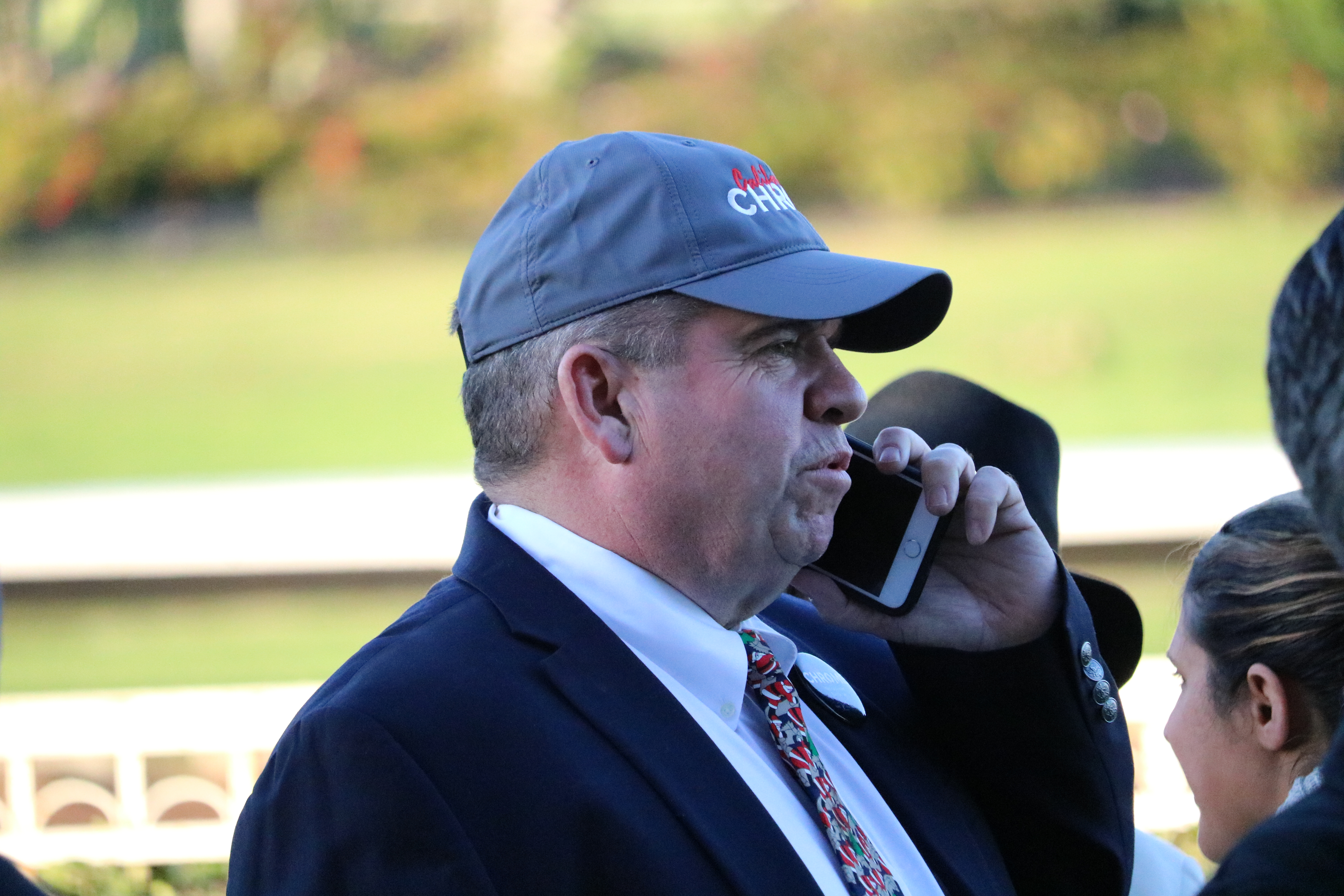
Frank Taylor, 2016

Taylor Made is divided into two separate companies: Taylor Made Sales Agency, and Taylor Made Stallions Inc. Taylor Made Sales Agency is in involved with public and private sales as well as a boarding facility. The brothers of the Taylor family have been the sole the owners of the corporation since 1986.

Taylor Made is headed by Duncan Taylor, the president and CEO of the family-owned farm. Ben Taylor is the vice president of the company's Taylor Made Stallions division. The farm now is 1,600 acres today.

=== Taylor Made Sales Agency ===
Taylor Made Sales Agency is a leading consignor of Thoroughbred horses.

For fourteenth time since 2001, Taylor Made was the leading consignor at the 2016 January Horse of All Ages Keeneland Sales auction with 92 horses sold for $4,359,500.

=== Boarding operations ===
Taylor Made Farm has 22 barns with 429 stalls. The farm has three round pens, five exercise walkers and 107 paddocks. Frank Taylor is the Vice President of boarding operations.

=== Taylor Made stallions ===
As of January 2022, stallions standing at Taylor Made include:

- Knicks Go, 2021 American Horse of the Year; winner of the 2020 Breeders' Cup Dirt Mile, 2021 Pegasus World Cup, and 2021 Breeders' Cup Classic. The 2022 breeding season is his first.
- Midnight Storm: A son of Pioneerof the Nile, Midnight Storm is a multiple graded stakes winner on both dirt and turf surfaces. His biggest wins include the Shoemaker Mile Stakes, Del Mar Derby, and San Pasqual Stakes.
- Mshawish: A son of Medaglia d'Oro, Mshawish won five graded stakes on both dirt and turf. He finished sixth in the 2016 Dubai World Cup behind California Chrome.
- Not This Time: A son of Giant's Causeway and half brother to Breeders' Cup Champion Liam's Map, Not This Time won the Gr.III Iroquois Stakes by over 8 lengths as a juvenile, and ran second to eventual juvenile champion Classic Empire in the 2016 Breeders' Cup Juvenile.

Stallions previously standing at Taylor Made included:

- Unbridled's Song (1993–2013), winner of the Breeders' Cup Juvenile, Florida Derby and Wood Memorial.
- Northern Afleet: Northern Afleet entered stud in 1999 at Double Diamond Farm in Ocala. He moved to Taylor Made Farm in 2004 and is the sire of champion Afleet Alex. He has sired a Breeders' Cup winner and has a son that sired a Breeders' Cup winner. Northern Afleet died in June 2018.
- Astrology: In 2012, Astrology retired to Taylor Made Farm to stud with a 3–3–3 record from 12 starts and earnings of $516,977.
- California Chrome: Taylor Made Farm bought a 30% share of 2014 Kentucky Derby winner and two-time American Horse of the Year, California Chrome in 2015, with the intent of racing him in 2016 then retiring him in 2017. He was retired after his run in the inaugural Pegasus World Cup. In 2019, the horse's syndicate agreed to sell him to a Japanese group, and he was moved to Japan, where he now stands. Both parties agreed that once California Chrome's breeding career ends, he will be returned to Taylor Made to live out his days.
- Daddy Long Legs: From the accomplished sire Scat Daddy, Daddy Long Legs is a winner of two Grade 2 races and is already seeing success as a sire of sires.
- Graydar: In 2013, Graydar retired to Taylor Made Farm for stud as a Twin Creeks Racing/Taylor Made Stallions venture. A son of former Taylor Made stallion Unbridled's Song, he won the Donn Handicap, New Orleans Handicap, and Kelso Handicap during his racing career. Graydar was bred in Kentucky by William Farish.
