= Lukas Classic Stakes =

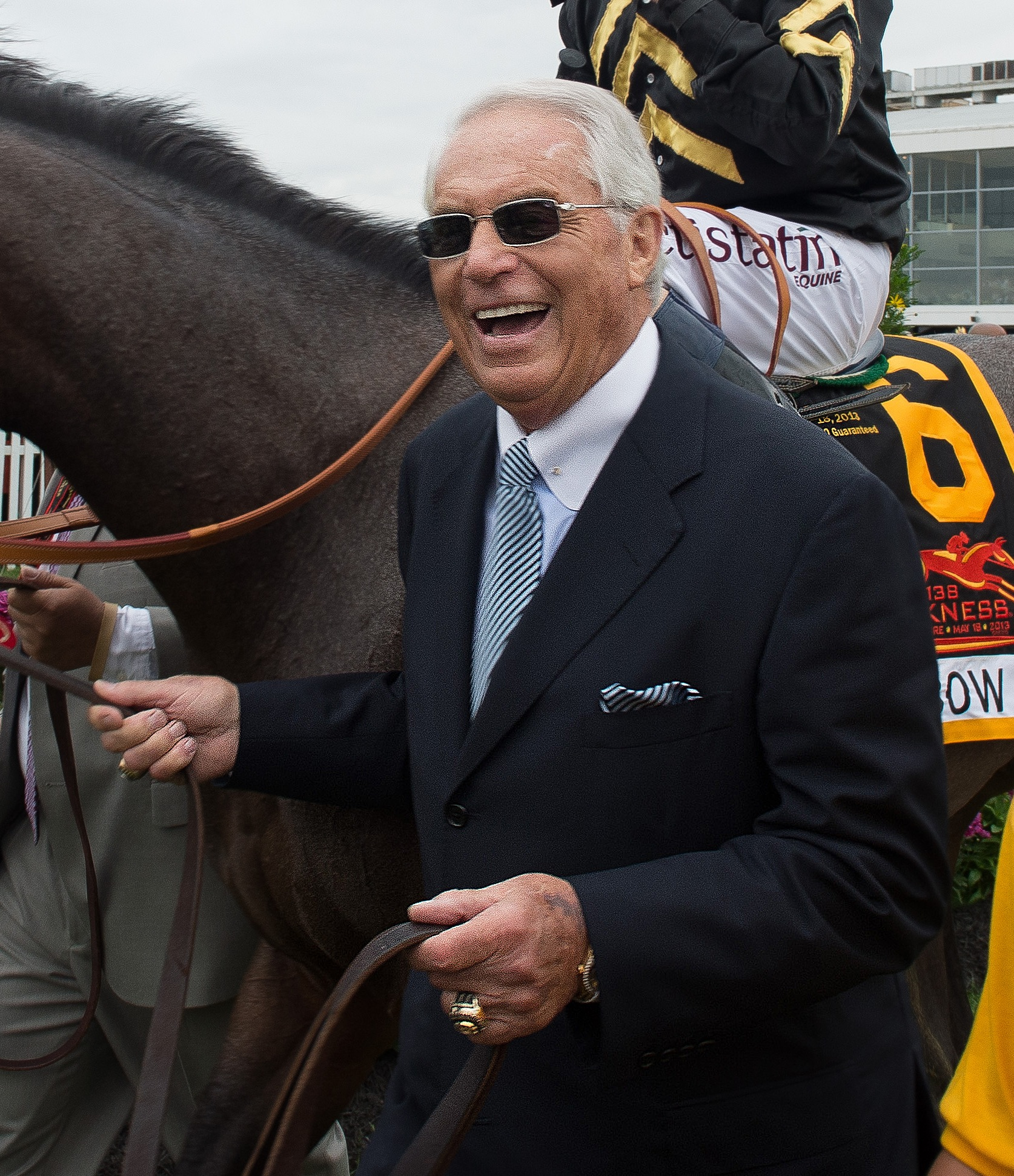
- D. Wayne Lukas, for whom the race is named
- Class: Grade II
- Location: Churchill Downs; Louisville, Kentucky, USA
- Inaugurated: 2013 (as Homecoming Classic Stakes)
- Race type: Thoroughbred - Flat racing - Dirt
- Website: Churchill Downs

Race information
- Distance: 1 1/8 miles (9 furlongs)
- Surface: Dirt
- Track: Left-handed
- Qualification: Three-Year-Olds and older
- Weight: Base weights with allowances: 4-year-olds and up: 125 lbs. 3-year-olds: 122 lbs.
- Purse: $500,000 (2022)

The Lukas Classic Stakes is a Grade II American Thoroughbred horse race for three years old and older, over a distance of 1 1/8 miles on the dirt held annually in September at Churchill Downs, in Louisville, Kentucky. The event currently carries a purse of $500,000.

== History ==
The race was inaugurated in 2013, as the Homecoming Classic Stakes with a stakes purse of $175,000.

In 2015 the event was renamed to the Lukas Classic Stakes after U.S. Racing Hall of Fame horse trainer D. Wayne Lukas. Churchill Downs administration indicated that the change of name to Lukas Classic was "to salute Lukas' accomplishments, contributions and influence on Churchill Downs, the Kentucky Derby and Oaks, and the horse industry." Lukas has won the Kentucky Derby and the Oaks four times apiece.

Previously a Listed race, it was upgraded to Grade III status for 2017 by the American Graded Stakes Committee.

In 2020 due to the COVID-19 pandemic in the United States, Churchill Downs did not schedule the event in their updated meeting.

In 2022 the American Graded Stakes Committee upgraded the event to Grade II.

== Records ==
Speed record:

- 1:47.85 – Knicks Go (2021)

Margins:

- 4 3/4 lengths – Mind Your Biscuits (2017) & Honorable Duty (2018)

Most wins

- No horse has won this race more than once.

Most wins by a jockey

- 3 – Tyler Gaffalione (2018, 2022, 2026)

Most wins by a trainer

- 3 – Brad H. Cox (2021, 2024, 2026)

Most wins by an owner

- No owner has won this race more than once.

== Winners ==
Year	Winner	Age	Jockey	Trainer	Owner	Time	Purse	Grade	Ref
Lukas Classic Stakes
2026	Dragoon Guard	5	Tyler Gaffalione	Brad H. Cox	Juddmonte Farms	1:48.35	$498,000	II	
2025	Mystik Dan	4	Francisco Arrieta	Kenneth G. McPeek	Lance Gasway, 4 G Racing, Daniel Hamby III, & Valley View Farm	1:49.25	$500,000	II	
2024	Hit Show	4	Florent Geroux	Brad H. Cox	Wathnan Racing	1:50.44	$500,000	II	
2023	Clapton	4	Cristian Torres	Chad Summers	RRR Racing	1:48.79	$438,660	II	
2022	Hot Rod Charlie	4	Tyler Gaffalione	Doug O'Neill	Roadrunner Racing, Boat Racing, William Strauss, & Gainesway Farm	1:49.77	$498,000	II	
2021	Knicks Go	5	Joel Rosario	Brad H. Cox	Korea Racing Authority	1:47.85	$400,000	III	
2020	Race not held								
2019	Mocito Rojo	5	Gerard Melancon	Shane Wilson	Wayne T. Davis	1:48.91	$250,000	III	
2018	Mind Your Biscuits	5	Tyler Gaffalione	Chad Summers	Shadai Farm, J Stables, Head of Plains Part., M.S., D., C. Summers, M. Kisber	1:48.64	$200,000	III	
2017	Honorable Duty	5	Corey J. Lanerie	Brendan P. Walsh	DARRS	1:49.42	$300,000	III	
2016	Noble Bird	5	Julien R. Leparoux	Mark E. Casse	John C. Oxley	1:49.03	$175,000	Listed	
2015	Geothermal	6	Robby Albarado	Steve Margolis	A. L. Luedtke	1:49.93	$175,000	Listed	
Homecoming Classic Stakes
2014	Cigar Street	5	Shaun Bridgmohan	William I. Mott	J. Ballis & R. Lewis	1:49.87	$135,000		
2013	Fort Larned	5	Brian J. Hernandez, Jr.	Ian R. Wilkes	Janice R. Whitham	1:48.58	$191,275		

== See also ==
- List of American and Canadian Graded races
