= Half Ours =

American-bred Thoroughbred racehorse

- Sire: Unbridled's Song
- Grandsire: Unbridled
- Dam: Zing
- Damsire: Storm Cat
- Sex: Stallion
- Foaled: 2003
- Country: United States
- Color: Gray/Roan
- Breeder: Brilliant Stables (Fred Hertrich & Philip McCarthy)
- Owner: Aaron & Marie Jones & Barry K. Schwartz
- Trainer: Todd Pletcher
- Record: 7: 5-1-0
- Earnings: US$319,680

Major wins
- Three Chimneys Juvenile (2005); Richter Scale Sprint Handicap (2007)

Half Ours (foaled March 27, 2003 in Kentucky) is a Thoroughbred race horse. A striking grey roan like his sire, he is a son of Unbridled's Song out of the winning mare Zing by Storm Cat. Zing is a full sister to stakes winner Yankee Gentleman. Grade 1 winner Key Phrase is the second dam of Half Ours.

After a workout on June 21, 2007, at Belmont Park, Half Ours suffered a fracture to a hind cannon bone and had surgery to insert two screws in the leg.

Beginning in 2008, Half Ours stood at Taylor Made farm as a stallion. In 2010 he was transferred to Clear Creek Stud, Folsom, Louisiana.

== Connections ==
Half Ours, originally owned by Aaron and Marie Jones in partnership with Barry K. Schwartz, was sold in November 2006 for a record 6.1 million dollars at Keeneland November breeding stock sale. In a dissolution of the partnership, Aaron Jones outbid Schwartz for the colt.

Laid off for nineteen months due a fractured ankle incurred in the Three Chimney's Juvenile, Half Ours returned to the races in December 2006.

Trained by Todd Pletcher, in his seven lifetime starts Half Ours was ridden by John Velazquez.

== Races ==
- 7th, Metropolitan Handicap - G1, May 28, 2007
- 2nd, The Alysheba Stakes - G3, May 4, 2007
- 1st, Richter Scale Breeders' Cup Sprint Championship Handicap - G2, March 3, 2007
- 1st, Optional Claiming, Gulfstream Park, February 4, 2007
- 1st, Optional Claiming, Aqueduct Race Track, December 14, 2006
- 1st, Three Chimneys Juvenile, Churchill Downs, May 7, 2005, by over four lengths.
- 1st, Maiden, Keeneland Race Course, April 17, 2005.
