= Cherokee Run =

American-bred Thoroughbred racehorse

- Sire: Runaway Groom
- Grandsire: Blushing Groom
- Dam: Cherokee Dame
- Damsire: Silver Saber
- Sex: Stallion
- Foaled: 1990
- Country: United States
- Colour: Black
- Breeder: George Onett
- Owner: Jill E. Robinson
- Trainer: Frank Gomez; Frank A. Alexander (at age 3)
- Record: 28: 13-5-5
- Earnings: $1,531,818

Major wins
- Dwyer Stakes (1993); Lafayette Stakes (1993); Derby Trial (1993); Frank J. De Francis Memorial Dash (1994); Gulfstream Park Sprint Championship (1995) American Classic Race wins: Breeders' Cup Sprint (1994); Preakness Stakes 2nd (1993)

Awards
- American Champion Sprint Horse (1994); Calder Race Course Hall of Fame (1998)

Cherokee Run (March 15, 1990 – July 2, 2016) was an American thoroughbred racehorse and sire.

== Background ==
He was bred by George Onett of Stone Gate Farm. Founder of Ocala Breeder Sales Company and first chairman of the board. sired by 1982 Canadian Hall of Fame inductee Runaway Groom, who in turn was a son of leading sire Blushing Groom. He was out of the mare Cherokee Dame, who is the daughter of Silver Saber, and Dame Franchesca who was by Frincis S. Onett popularized nicking to Nearco as with Cherikee Fellow and Groomstick wall with heavy traces directly back to Nearco, War Admiral, and Tom Fool.

Even though he is the offspring of two grey colored horses, Cherokee Run was born with a black coat and a white splash on the forehead just like his grandmother Dame Franchesca.

== Racing career ==
Cherokee Run got his start as a two-year-old under trainer Frank Gomez at Calder Race Course. He ran a total of seven times, winning five times and placing second in the What A Pleasure Stakes.

At three, he was sent to trainer Frank Alexander. Among his accomplishments, he took the Dwyer Stakes, the Derby Trial, and the Lafayette Stakes, and placed second in the Preakness Stakes to Prairie Bayou.

At four, he placed second to Holy Bull in the Metropolitan Handicap, and went on to win the Breeder's Cup Sprint. He also placed second in the A Phenomenon Handicap and the Tom Fool Stakes, and third in the Vosburgh Stakes and the Carter Handicap.

At five, he won the $100,000 Gulfstream Park Sprint Handicap.

== Retirement ==
Cherokee Run was retired in 1996 and stood at Jonabell Farm in Lexington, Kentucky, for a fee of $40,000 live foal. His family lines show ability to run on turf as well as dirt. The Onett family, breeders of Cherokee Run, continued racing his kinship in sprints as well as distance races on the dirt and turf, earning black type status in every category.

Some of his offspring are War Pass, Chilukki, Kafwain, Zanjero, Madame Cherokee, During, Recapturetheglory, Balraj, and Dash for Daylight. Sebastian's Song is also a son of Cherokee Run and has had a successful start to his career with three wins in seven lifetime starts. He ran in the 2008 Queen's Plate but is regarded as a top sprint prospect. One of his notable and promising young colts was Chelokee, who won the Northern Dancer Breeders' Cup and Barbaro Stakes before suffering a career-ending injury in the Alysheba Stakes at Churchill Downs, on May 2, 2008. Chedi, a 2007 Virginia bred gelding, out of Doctoressa (Doc's Leader), set a new track record at Colonial Downs on July 6, 2011, going 1 mile in 1:34.3.

Cherokee Run was euthanised because of "the infirmities of old age" on 2 July 2016.
