= Pennsylvania Derby =

- Class: Grade I
- Location: Parx Racing and Casino, Bensalem TWP., Pennsylvania, U.S.
- Inaugurated: 1979
- Race type: Thoroughbred – Flat racing
- Website: www.parxracing.com/paderby.php

Race information
- Distance: 1.125 miles (1.811 km) (9 furlongs)
- Surface: Dirt
- Track: left-handed
- Qualification: Three-year-olds
- Weight: 122 lbs. (55.3 kg)
- Purse: $1 million (2019)
- Bonuses: $50,000 to owner and trainer for entering horses who have won specified races

The Pennsylvania Derby is a race for thoroughbred horses run at Parx Racing and Casino (formerly known as Keystone Race Track, then from 1986 through 2010 as Philadelphia Park) each year. The track's premiere event is open to horses, age three, and is run at a distance of 1.125 miles (1.811 km) (9 furlongs) on the dirt and since 2007 normally offers a purse of $1 million.

In 2016, the purse was increased to $1.25 million because of the presence of the winners of two of the three Triple Crown races: Nyquist, winner of the 2016 Kentucky Derby, and Exaggerator, winner of the 2016 Preakness Stakes. If Creator, winner of the 2016 Belmont, had also raced, the purse would have been $1.5 million.

The Pennsylvania Derby began on Memorial Day in 1979 and achieved Graded status in 1981. From 1990 until 2009, with the exception of 2006 due to extensive renovations, the race was held on Labor Day; in 2004, it was elevated to a Grade II event. Starting in 2010, the race moved to the last Saturday of September in an attempt to get a stronger field preparing for the Breeders' Cup; the move to late September also made it possible to move away from another premier event, the Travers Stakes at Saratoga Race Course in New York State. In 2017 it was raised to Grade I status for the first time.

In 1991, Andrea Seefeldt became the first female jockey to win the Pennsylvania Derby and the following year Pam Shavelson became the first female trainer to win the race. There was no running of the Pennsylvania Derby in 2020.

== Records ==
Time record:

- 1:46.96 – Bayern (2014)

Largest winning margin:

- Western Playboy – 17 lengths

Most wins by a jockey:

- 3 – Joe Bravo (1994, 2003, 2008)
- 3 – Mike Smith (2017, 2018, 2022)

Most wins by a trainer:

- 4 – Bob Baffert (2014, 2017, 2018, 2022)

Most wins by an owner:

- 2 – Ryehill Farm (1979, 1988)
- 2 – Robert E. Meyerhoff (1986, 1991)
- 2 – Dogwood Stable (1990, 1993)

== Winners ==
| Year | Winner | Jockey | Trainer | Owner | Grade | Time |
|---|---|---|---|---|---|---|
| 2026 | The Puma | Javier Castellano | Gustavo Delgado | OGMA Investments LLC, High Step Racing, TCC Stables LLC, YNG Stables LLC & JR Ranch | I | 1:49.10 |
| 2025 | Baeza | Hector Iassc Berrios | John Shirreffs | C R K Stable & Grandview Equine | I | 1:48.03 |
| 2024 | Seize the Grey | Jamie Torres | D. Wayne Lukas | MyRacehorse | I | 1:51.89 |
| 2023 | Saudi Crown | Florent Geroux | Brad H. Cox | FMQ Stables | I | 1:50.62 |
| 2022 | Taiba | Mike Smith | Bob Baffert | Zedan Racing Stakes | I | 1:48.67 |
| 2021 | Hot Rod Charlie | Flavien Prat | Doug O'Neill | Roadrunner Racing, William Strauss, Boat Racing & Gainesway Stable | I | 1:48.63 |
| 2020 | No race held | | | | | |
| 2019 | Math Wizard | Irad Ortiz, Jr | Saffie A. Joseph Jr. | John Fanelli, Collarmele Vitelli Stables, Bassett Stables, Ioannis Zoumas, Wynwood Thoroughbreds & Saffie A. Joseph, Jr. | I | 1:50.94 |
| 2018 | McKinzie | Mike Smith | Bob Baffert | Karl Watson, Michael E. Pegram, Paul Weitman | I | 1:52.05 |
| 2017 | West Coast | Mike Smith | Bob Baffert | Gary and Mary West | I | 1:49.91 |
| 2016 | Connect | Javier Castellano | Chad C. Brown | Paul P. Pompa | II | 1:50.20 |
| 2015 | Frosted | Joel Rosario | Kiaran McLaughlin | Godolphin Racing | II | 1:50.04 |
| 2014 | Bayern | Martin Garcia | Bob Baffert | Kaleem Shah | II | 1:46.96 * |
| 2013 | Will Take Charge | Luis Saez | D. Wayne Lukas | Willis D. Horton | II | 1:49.28 |
| 2012 | Handsome Mike | Irad Ortiz, Jr | Leandro Mora | J. Paul Reddam | II | 1:51.63 |
| 2011 | To Honor and Serve | Jose Lezcano | William Mott | Live Oak Plantation | II | 1:47.34 |
| 2010 | Morning Line | John R. Velazquez | Nick Zito | Thoroughbred Legends Racing | II | 1:47.85 |
| 2009 | Gone Astray | Eddie Castro | Shug McGaughey | Phipps Stable | II | 1:48.27 |
| 2008 | Anak Nakal | Joe Bravo | Nick Zito | Four Roses Thoroughbreds | II | 1:48.99 |
| 2007 | Timber Reserve | Javier Castellano | John C. Kimmel | Circle E Racing, Cesar P. Kimmel & Philip J. Solondz | II | 1:47.67 |
| 2006 | No race held | | | | | |
| 2005 | Sun King | Rafael Bejarano | Nick Zito | Tracy Farmer | II | 1:49.43 |
| 2004 | Love of Money | Robby Albarado | Richard E. Dutrow Jr. | Jay Em Ess Stable | II | 1:48.42 |
| 2003 | Grande Hombre | Joe Bravo | Dennis Manning | Earle I. Mack | III | 1:49.03 |
| 2002 | Harlan's Holiday | Edgar Prado | Todd Pletcher | Starlight Stables | III | 1:51.10 |
| 2001 | Macho Uno | Gary Stevens | Joe Orseno | Stronach Stables | III | 1:49.03 |
| 2000 | Pine Dance | Mike McCarthy | Dermot Weld | George Hofmeister | III | 1:49.03 |
| 1999 | Smart Guy | Robert Colton | Timothy Ritchey | Goodfellas Stable | III | 1:49.40 |
| 1998 | Rock and Roll | Heberto Castillo Jr. | William Mott | M. Paulson & J. Craig | III | 1:47.69 |
| 1997 | Frisk Me Now | Edwin L. King Jr. | Robert J. Durso | Carol R. Dender | III | 1:48.14 |
| 1996 | Devil's Honor | Tony Black | Walter C. Reese | Noreen Carpenito | III | 1:48.58 |
| 1995 | Pineing Patty | Larry Melancon | Lynn S. Whiting | W. Cal Partee | II | 1:48.05 |
| 1994 | Meadow Flight | Joe Bravo | James Ryerson | Aliyuee Ben J Stables | II | 1:49.08 |
| 1993 | Wallenda | Herb McCauley | Frank A. Alexander | Dogwood Stable | II | 1:49.33 |
| 1992 | Thelastcrusade | Victor Molina | Pam Shavelson | Petrified Stable | II | 1:49.47 |
| 1991 | Valley Crossing | Andrea Seefeldt | Richard W. Small | Robert E. Meyerhoff | II | 1:50.00 |
| 1990 | Summer Squall | Pat Day | Neil J. Howard | Dogwood Stable | II | 1:48.20 |
| 1989 | Western Playboy | Kerwin Clark | Harvey L. Vanier | Nancy A. Vanier & Script R Farm | II | 1:47.60 |
| 1988 | Cefis | Larry Saumell | Woody Stephens | Ryehill Farm | II | 1:49.60 |
| 1987 | Afleet | Gary Stahlbaum | Phil England | Taylor Made Farm | II | 1:48.20 |
| 1986 | Broad Brush | Ángel Cordero Jr. | Richard W. Small | Robert E. Meyerhoff | II | 1:50.80 |
| 1985 | Skip Trial | Jean-Luc Samyn | Sonny Hine | Zelda Cohen | II | 1:50.20 |
| 1984 | Morning Bob | Greg McCarron | Woody Stephens | Brushwood Stable | II | 1:49.40 |
| 1983 | Dixieland Band | William J. Passmore | Charles Peoples | Mary Sharp | II | 1:49.40 |
| 1982 | Spanish Drums | Jacinto Vásquez | Anthony Arcodia | Anthony Drakas | III | 1:49.00 |
| 1981 | Summing | George Martens | Luis S. Barrera | Charles T. Wilson Jr. | III | 1:49.00 |
| 1980 | Lively King | Chris Baker | Leon A. Parker Jr. | Frank A. Bonsal Jr. | | 1:48.80 |
| 1979 | Smarten | Sam Maple | Woody Stephens | Ryehill Farm | | 1:49.20 |
