= Gulfstream Park Sprint Stakes =

- Class: Listed
- Location: Gulfstream Park; Hallandale Beach, Florida, United States
- Inaugurated: 1972
- Race type: Thoroughbred – Flat racing
- Website: www.gulfstreampark.com

Race information
- Distance: 6 furlong sprint
- Surface: Dirt
- Track: left-handed
- Qualification: Four-years-old and older
- Weight: 123 lbs with allowances
- Purse: US$150,000 (since 2022)

The Gulfstream Park Sprint Stakes is a Listed American Thoroughbred horse race for three-year-olds and older at a distance of six furlongs on the dirt run annually in early mid-February at Gulfstream Park in Hallandale Beach, Florida. The event currently offers a purse of $150,000.

== History ==
Inaugurated as the Gulfstream Park Sprint Championship, from 2003–2009 the race was run as the Richter Scale Sprint Handicap in honor of Richter Scale, who won the race in 2000. It reverted to the original name in 2010 for several years before it was renamed in 2020 as the World of Trouble Sprint Stakes. World of Trouble was a Grade I winner in 2019 on both turf and dirt.

The race has been run at a variety of distances:

- 6 furlongs – 1987, 1990, 2019 to present
- 6 1/2 furlongs – 2015–2018
- 7 furlongs – 1972–1986, 1988–1989, 1991–2014

There was no race run in 1973, 1975, 1976, 1978–1980, and 1982.

For the 2020 the event was known as the World of Trouble Sprint Stakes.

== Records ==
Speed record:

- 6 furlongs – 1:08.88 – Miles Ahead (2022)
- 7 furlongs – 1:20.65 – Falling Sky (2014)

Most wins:

- No horse has won this race more than once

Most wins by a jockey:

- 4 – Luis Saez (2014, 2018, 2019, 2020)

Most wins by a trainer:

- 4 – Todd Pletcher (1998, 2004, 2007, 2010)

== Winners ==
Year	Winner	Age	Jockey	Trainer	Owner	Distance	Time	Grade
2020	Jackson	4	Luis Saez	Jose Pinchin	Tracy Pinchin	6 fur.	1:09.55	III
2019	Recruiting Ready	5	Luis Saez	Stanley Hough	Sagamore Farm	6 fur.	1:09.53	III
2018	Classic Rock	4	Luis Saez	Katherine Ritvo	Reeves Thoroughbred Racing	6 1/2 fur.	1:18.32	III
2017	Unified	4	José Ortiz	James Jerkens	Centennial Farms	6 1/2 fur.	1:15.30	III
2016	X Y Jet	4	Emisael Jaramillo	Jorge Navarro	Rockingham Ranch/Gelfenstein Farm	6 1/2 fur.	1:15.95	III
2015	C Zee	4	Edgard J. Zayas	Stanley I. Gold	Jacks or Better Farm	6 1/2 fur.	1:17.84	III
2014	Falling Sky	4	Luis Saez	George Weaver	Newtown Anner Stud/Bulger	7-fur.	1:20.65	III
2013	Fort Loudon	4	Jose Lezcano	Nicholas Zito	Jacks or Better Farm	7-fur.	1:21.84	III
2012	Force Freeze	7	Paco Lopez	Peter Walder	Saeed Naser Al Romaithi	7-fur.	1:20.71	II
2011	Tackleberry	4	Javier Santiago	Luis Olivares	Luis Olivares	7-fur.	1:22.84	II
2010	Munnings	4	Javier Castellano	Todd Pletcher	Magnier/Tabor/Smith	7-fur.	1:22.49	II
2009	How's Your Halo	6	Juan Levya	Brian Prichard	Brian Prichard	7-fur.	1:23.16	II
2008	Commentator	7	John Velazquez	Nick Zito	Tracy Farmer	7-fur.	1:23.23	II
2007	Half Ours	4	John Velazquez	Todd Pletcher	Aaron & Marie Jones	7-fur.	1:22.21	II
2006	Mister Fotis	5	Rafael Bejarano	Martin D. Wolfson	Alago, Inc.	7-fur.	1:21.73	II
2005	Sir Shackleton	4	Javier Castellano	Nick Zito	Tracy Farmer	7-fur.	1:21.64	II
2004	Lion Tamer	4	John Velazquez	Todd Pletcher	Michael Tabor	7-fur.	1:21.52	II
2003	Tour of the Cat	5	Abad Cabassa Jr.	Myra Mora	Double G Stable	7-fur.	1:21.15	II
2002	Dream Run	3	Pat Day	Paul J. McGee	John P. Murphy Jr.	7-fur.	1:22.30	II
2001	Hook and Ladder	4	Richard Migliore	John C. Kimmel	Chester & Mary Broman	7-fur.	1:21.85	II
2000	Richter Scale	6	Richard Migliore	Mary Jo Lohmeier	Richard & Nancy Kaster	7-fur.	1:23.30	II
1999	Frisk Me Now	5	Eddie L. King Jr.	Robert J. Durso	Carol R. Dender	7-fur.	1:22.86	II
1998	Rare Rock	5	Pat Day	Todd Pletcher	Betty Massey/Jacob Pletcher	7-fur.	1:22.00	III
1997	Frisco View	4	Jerry Bailey	Frank L. Brothers	Lazy Lane Farm	7-fur.	1:23.14	III
1996	Patton	6	Robbie Davis	Sonny Hine	Marilyn Rothstein & Carolyn Hine	7-fur.	1:21.81	III
1995	Cherokee Run	5	Mike E. Smith	Frank A. Alexander	Jill E. Robinson	7-fur.	1:21.70	
1994	I Can't Believe	6	Eddie Maple	Frank A. Passero Jr.	John Brnjas	7-fur.	1:22.55	
1993	Binalong	4	Jerry Bailey	Carl Nafzger	James B. Tafel	7-fur.	1:22.35	
1992	Groomstick	6	Wigberto Ramos	Luis Olivares	Cobbleview Farms (Gardner F. Landon)	7-fur.	1:23.98	
1991	Gervazy	4	Wigberto Ramos	François Parisel	Buckram Oak Farm	7-fur.	1:21.40	
1990	Dancing Spree †	5	Ángel Cordero Jr.	Shug McGaughey	Ogden Phipps	7-fur.	1:10.00	
1989	Claim	4	Craig Perret	Shug McGaughey	Claiborne Farm	7-fur.	1:23.40	
1988	Royal Pennant	5	José A. Santos	Angel Penna Jr.	Lazy F Ranch	7-fur.	1:23.20	
1987	Dwight D.	5	Robert Lester	Thomas W. Kelley	Clarence B. Benjamin	6-fur.	1:10.80	
1986	Hot Cop	4	Jean-Luc Samyn	Scotty Schulhofer	Dr. D. J. DeLuke	7-fur.	1:22.80	
1985	Key To The Moon	4	Robin Platts	Gil Rowntree	B.K.Y. Stable	7-fur.	1:22.60	
1984	Number One Special	4	Earlie Fires	Warren A. Croll Jr.	Blanche Levy	7-fur.	1:21.20	
1983	Deputy Minister	4	Don MacBeth	Reynaldo H. Nobles	Due Process Stable et al.	7-fur.	1:22.80	
1982	No Race	-	No Race	No Race	No Race	no race	0:00.00	
1981	King's Fashion	-	Jean-Luc Samyn	Allen Jerkens	Bohemia Stable	7-fur.	1:22.60	
1978	– 1980 No Races	-	No Race	No Race	No Race	no race	0:00.00	
1977	Yamanin	5	William Gavidia			7-fur.	1:22.80	
1975	– 1976 No Races	-	No Race	No Race	No Race	no race	0:00.00	
1974	Cheriepe	4	Jorge Velásquez			7-fur.	1:22.40	
1973	No Race	-	No Race	No Race	No Race	no race	0:00.00	
1972	Close Decision	5				7-fur.	1:22.80	

* † In 1990, Pentelicus won but was disqualified for interference and set back to second.
