= Runaway Groom =

Canadian-bred Thoroughbred racehorse

- Sire: Blushing Groom
- Grandsire: Red God
- Dam: Yonnie Girl
- Damsire: Call The Witness
- Sex: Stallion
- Foaled: 1979
- Country: Canada
- Colour: Gray
- Breeder: Gardiner Farms
- Owner: Albert P. Coppola, Sr.
- Trainer: John DiMario; Charlie Whittingham
- Record: 18-6-5-1
- Earnings: $347,537

Major wins
- Prince of Wales Stakes (1982); Breeders' Stakes (1982); Travers Stakes (1982)

Awards
- Canadian Champion 3-Yr-Old- Colt (1982)

Honours
- Canadian Horse Racing Hall of Fame (2001)
- Last updated on March 15, 2007

Runaway Groom (1979–2007) was a Canadian Hall of Fame Thoroughbred racehorse.

== Background ==
Bred by Gardiner Farms in Caledon, Ontario, Runaway Groom was sired by the prominent Nearco descendant Blushing Groom out of the mare Yonnie Girl. He was purchased as a yearling at the Fasig-Tipton sale in Kentucky by New Yorker Albert P. Coppola, who only realized later that the colt's birthplace meant he qualified for the Canadian Triple Crown series.

== Racing career ==
Runaway Groom did not race at age two. Trained by New Yorker John DiMario, he began his career in the spring of 1982 at age three. Racing in Kentucky, he won two of his first four races, then was sent to Toronto's Woodbine Racetrack for the Queen's Plate, the most prestigious race in Canada and the first leg of the Canadian Triple Crown series. Under jockey Robin Platts, the lightly regarded Runaway Groom surprised fans and bettors as he finished a solid second behind Son of Briartic. In the ensuing Prince of Wales Stakes, Runaway Groom turned the tables on the Plate winner, winning it as well as the third leg of the Triple Crown, the Breeders' Stakes.

Brought to New York to compete, Runaway Groom won an allowance race at Belmont Park before competing in Saratoga Race Course's premier event, the Grade I Travers Stakes. In a very strong field, bettors sent the colt off at 13-1 odds but under Canadian jockey Jeffrey Fell, Runaway Groom won the race, marking the second time in American racing history that a horse has beaten the Kentucky Derby winner (Gato Del Sol), the Preakness Stakes winner (Aloma's Ruler), and the Belmont Stakes winner (Conquistador Cielo) in the same race. The first took place when Sun Briar defeated Kentucky Derby winner (Exterminator), Preakness Stakes winner (War Cloud), and Belmont Stakes winner (Johren) in the 1918 Travers.

For his 1982 performances, Runaway Groom earned Canadian Champion 3-Yr-Old- Colt honors. When he raced at age four in California, his conditioning was taken over by Charles Whittingham. His best graded stakes race result before he retired to stud duty was a third in the 1983 San Diego Handicap at Del Mar Racetrack.

== Stud record ==
Sent to the Vinery breeding farm in Lexington, Kentucky, Runaway Groom had a long and successful stud career. He sired a number of Graded stakes race winners, including Cherokee Run (who won the 1994 Breeders' Cup Sprint), 2006 Sunshine Millions Oaks and 2007 Sunshine Millions Distaff winner Joint Effort, Japanese runner Machikane Hokushin, and multiple-stakes-winning millionaires Down The Aisle and Wekiva Springs.

In 2001, Runaway Groom was inducted into the Canadian Horse Racing Hall of Fame. In February 2007, the 28-year-old horse was pensioned from stud duty, having sired sixty stakes race winners and twenty-seven graded stakes winners.

On June 8, 2007, Runaway Groom was humanely euthanized due to the infirmities of old age.
