= Hot Rod Charlie =

American Thoroughbred racehorse

- Sire: Oxbow
- Grandsire: Awesome Again
- Dam: Indian Miss
- Damsire: Indian Charlie
- Sex: Stallion
- Foaled: April 11, 2018 (age 8)
- Country: United States
- Color: Dark Bay
- Breeder: Edward A. Cox Jr.
- Owner: Roadrunner Racing; Boat Racing; William Strauss; Gainesway Farm
- Trainer: Doug O'Neill
- Record: 19: 5–5–4
- Earnings: $5,676,720

Major wins
- Louisiana Derby (2021); Pennsylvania Derby (2021); Al Maktoum Challenge, Round 2 (2022); Lukas Classic Stakes (2022)

Awards
- Secretariat Vox Populi Award (2021)
- Last updated on 6 December 2022

Hot Rod Charlie (foaled April 11, 2018) is an American Thoroughbred racehorse who won the 2021 Pennsylvania Derby and Louisiana Derby. He also came second in the 2020 Breeders' Cup Juvenile and 2021 Kentucky Derby and Belmont Stakes, and fourth in the 2021 Breeders' Cup Classic. He was voted the winner of the 2021 Secretariat Vox Populi Award.

== Background ==
Hot Rod Charlie is a dark bay stallion bred in Kentucky. Charlie is by Oxbow and out of Indian Miss who is a daughter of Awesome Again. Oxbow is the 2013 Preakness Stakes winner, for whom Charlie is his leading performer to date. His half-brother is Eclipse winner Mitole. Both Hot Rod Charlie and Mitole were bred by the late Edward Cox Jr.

Trained by Doug O'Neill, he was originally purchased in February 2019 by Bob and Sean Feld for $17,000 as part of the breeders dispersal after his death, he was then purchased in October 2019 for $110,000 by Roadrunner Racing (50%), William Strauss (25%) and Boat Racing LLC (25%) by Dennis O'Neill. Boat Racing LLC partners include five former members of the Brown University football team: Reiley Higgins, Patrick O'Neill, Alex Quoyeser, Eric Armagost, and Dan Giovacchini. They consider the horse their sixth member. Patrick O'Neill is a nephew of trainer Doug O'Neill and, as he was born into a Thoroughbred racing family, he acted as a guide for the other Boat Racing LLC partners as they debuted as horse owners in the sport.

== Racing career ==
=== 2020: Two-year-old season ===
Hot Rod Charlie started his career with fourth, third, and fifth-place finishes in three maiden special weight races at Del Mar Racetrack. In his second race, he finished behind future Grade I winner Get Her Number.

He finally broke his maiden in a Santa Anita maiden special weight on October 2.

Hot Rod Charlie went straight to the Breeders' Cup Juvenile at Keeneland Racecourse, where he nearly pulled a huge upset after running second at odds of 94-1 behind the winner and eventual 2020 Champion Two-Year-Old Essential Quality.

=== 2021: Three-year-old season ===
Hot Rod Charlie made his first start as a three-year-old in the Robert B. Lewis Stakes at Santa Anita Park, where he came in third in a blanket finish won by future Kentucky Derby winner Medina Spirit.

On March 20, Hot Rod Charlie won the 2021 Louisiana Derby over Lecomte Stakes winner Midnight Bourbon and Risen Star Stakes winner Mandaloun. He broke the track record for the 1 3/16 mile course with a time of 1:55:06. He won by over two lengths and took home the winner's share of a $1 million purse. This victory secured him a spot in the 2021 Kentucky Derby field.

In the Kentucky Derby, Hot Rod Charlie, under jockey Flavien Prat, crossed the wire third behind Medina Spirit and Mandaloun, with Essential Quality fourth.

Hot Rod Charlie bypassed the 2021 Preakness Stakes, the second leg of Triple Crown, to make his next start in the 2021 Belmont Stakes, the third leg of the Triple Crown. Sent off at odds of 9–2, he set the fastest early fractions in the history of the race before finishing second after a stretch battle with Essential Quality. It was another 11 lengths back to Preakness Stakes winner Rombauer in third. In the Belmont, he was ridden again by Flavien Prat, who had ridden Rombauer to victory in the Preakness. When Hot Rod Charlie was entered in the Belmont, Prat honored his prior commitment to ride him rather than to ride Rombauer, who also ran in the race.

On July 17 in the Haskell Stakes at Monmouth Park Racetrack in Oceanport, New Jersey, Hot Rod Charlie crossed the finish line first but was disqualified. He was moved to last place for impeding the path of Midnight Bourbon, whose jockey, Paco Lopez, was dislodged. Subsequently, Mandaloun, who had crossed second in a photo finish, was declared the winner. The 2021 Haskell Stakes was the first major race in the United States where jockeys were unable to use a whip in anything but an emergency situation as per a relatively new New Jersey state law. When asked if this affected the race's outcome and the accident, Charlie's jockey Flavien Prat said, "Yes, the lack of a crop came into play. I was trying to correct him as much as I could. If I could have hit him just one time left-handed, we would have been just fine, but it is what it is."

On September 25, in the Pennsylvania Derby, at Parx Racing, in Bensalem, Pennsylvania, Hot Rod Charlie crossed the finish line first, winning the $1 million Grade I race by 2 1/4 lengths in front of Midnight Bourbon. His time for this 1 1/8-mile race for 3-year-olds was 1:48.63. Again, his race was overshadowed by another inquiry and a rider's claim of foul for the same horse, Midnight Bourbon as his last race, the Haskell Stakes. The stewards did not see enough conclusive proof that would warrant disqualification, so the result stood and the race order stayed in Charlie's favor. Hot Rod Charlie's trainer, Doug O'Neill, saw no foul, but Midnight Bourbon's trainer, Steve Ausmussen, did not share his view, saying, “Flavien Prat almost drops Midnight Bourbon for the second time. My horse ran well. He survived."

Charlie's next stop was the November 6, 2021, Breeders' Cup Classic (G1), where he ran fourth.

In December 2021, Hot Rod Charlie was named the winner of that year's Secretariat Vox Populi Award (created by Secretariat's owner Penny Chenery), which "recognizes the horse whose popularity and racing excellence best resounded with the American public and gained recognition for Thoroughbred racing"

On 26 December 2021, Hot Rod Charlie raced in the Grade II San Antonio Stakes and started as the 1/5 favorite. He was well placed in the early going, off the rail or outside a rival, bid alongside the leader on the far turn, battled down the stretch while brushing with Eight Ring, took a short lead in the straight, and was caught at the finish line.

=== 2022: Four-year-old season ===
The connections of Hot Rod Charlie entered the horse for the Dubai World Cup. On 17 January, he departed the U.S. to prepare for the event, having his last workout at Santa Anita Park going five furlongs in 1:01 1/5. Hot Rod Charlie won the Group 2 Al Maktoum Challenge, Round 2 on February 4 as a final prep for the World Cup. Hot Rod Charlie went to the lead early and cleared out with a 1 1/2 furlongs to go to win by 5 1/4.

Hot Rod Charlie started in the Dubai World Cup on March 26 at Meydan in the United Arab Emirates. Country Grammer crossed the wire 1 3/4 lengths in front of Hot Rod Charlie, who grabbed second for a United States exacta, while favorite Life Is Good finished in fourth place. "We wanted to win but we're super proud of his effort," trainer Doug O'Neill said. Hot Rod Charlie earned US$2,000,000 for his second-place finish in one of the richest races in the world.

After a break of nearly three months, Hot Rod Charlie returned in the Grade III Salvator Mile at Monmouth Park. In a five-horse field, he was made the 1/5 favorite but was upset by 2/1 Mind Control after hitting the front in the stretch run, beaten by a head. The final time was 1:35.79 on a fast track.

On August 6, Hot Rod Charlie was entered in the Grade I Whitney Stakes at Saratoga Race Course. A field of five started, including Life Is Good and Happy Saver. Hot Rod Charlie, the third choice at 4/1, started well and tracked inside around the first turn, settled in second position while along the rail on the backstretch, and saved ground early on the far turn. He was 3 1/2 lengths behind leader Life Is Good and was still two lengths behind after six furlongs in a quick 1:10.93. Happy Saver and Hot Rod Charlie took runs at Life Is Good in the early stretch but could not pass him, with Hot Rod Charlie finishing third in a time of 1:48.97.

On October 1, Hot Rod Charlie faced five other horses including Art Collector, Happy Saver, and 2022 Kentucky Derby winner Rich Strike in the Grade II Lukas Classic Stakes. Starting as the 6/5 favorite, Hot Rod Charlie settled on the outside of leader Art Collector. As the horses rounded the turn into the stretch, Hot Rod Charlie took command but Rich Strike came four wide and took the lead at the sixteenth pole. However, with Tyler Gaffalione in the reins Hot Rod Charlie battled back to win by a head in a time of 1:49.77. Gaffalione said after the race, "Doug (trainer O'Neill) and his team really had him ready to run today. We broke well and he doesn't really have to be asked to get into a good spot. He really never gave up on me. (Rich Strike) ran a huge effort and my horse just kept on fighting the entire way. He really didn't want to get beat."

Hot Rod Charlie finished sixth to Flightline in the 2022 Breeders' Cup Classic at Keeneland. He was subsequently retired to stud in Japan.

== Racing statistics ==
Date	Race	Racecourse	Grade / Group	Distance	Finish	Margin	Time	Odds	Weight	Jockey	Ref
2020 – Two-year-old season
Jul 11, 2020	Maiden	Del Mar		5 furlongs	4	(2 1/2 lengths)	59.00	1.20*	121 lbs	Abel Cedillo	
Aug 14, 2020	Maiden	Del Mar		5 furlongs	3	(3 3/4 lengths)	57.50	2.20*	120 lbs	Abel Cedillo	
Sep 7, 2020	Maiden	Del Mar		1 mile	5	(3 1/4 lengths)	1:38.47	2.20*	120 lbs	Flavien Prat	
Oct 2, 2020	Maiden	Santa Anita		1 mile	1	neck	1:38.00	3.00	122 lbs	Abel Cedillo	
Nov 6, 2020	Breeders' Cup Juvenile	Keeneland	I	1 1/16 miles	2	(3/4 length)	1:42.09	94.40	122 lbs	Tyler Gaffalione	
2021 – Three-year-old season
Jan 30, 2021	Robert B. Lewis Stakes	Santa Anita	III	1 1/16 miles	3	( 1/4 length)	1:46.26	2.50	120 lbs	Joel Rosario	
Mar 20, 2021	Louisiana Derby	Fair Grounds	II	1 3/16 miles	1	2 lengths	1:55.06 (Note: Hot Rod Charlie set a new track record for the 1 3/16 miles distance at the Fair Grounds)	2.90	122 lbs	Joel Rosario	
May 1, 2021	Kentucky Derby	Churchill Downs	I	1 1/4 miles	2	(1 1/4 lengths)	2:01.02	5.60	126 lbs	Flavien Prat	
Jun 5, 2021	Belmont Stakes	Belmont Park	I	1 1/2 miles	2	(1 1/4 lengths)	2:27.11	4.80	126 lbs	Flavien Prat	
Jul 17, 2021	Haskell Stakes	Monmouth Park	I	1 1/8 miles	7 (Note: Hot Rod Charlie was first past the post but was disqualified for interference in the stretch run and was placed seventh)	nose	1:47.38	0.80*	119 lbs	Flavien Prat	
Sep 25, 2021	Pennsylvania Derby	Parx Racing	I	1 1/8 miles	1	1 1/4 lengths	1:48.64	0.90*	122 lbs	Flavien Prat	
Nov 6, 2021	Breeders' Cup Classic	Del Mar	I	1 1/4 miles	4	(4 1/2 lengths)	1:59.57	3.20	122 lbs	Flavien Prat	
Dec 26, 2021	San Antonio Stakes	Santa Anita	II	1 1/16 miles	2	(nose)	1:44.82	0.20*	123 lbs	Flavien Prat	
2022 – Four-year-old season
Feb 4, 2022	Al Maktoum Challenge, Round 2	Meydan (UAE)	II	1900 metres (Note: Distance for the event was approximately 1 3/16 miles)	1	5 1/4 lengths	1:57.41	0.53* (Note: Hot Rod Charlie final odds with British Bookmakers were 8/15 odds-on since gambling is prohibited in the United Arab Emirates)	125 lbs (Note: Hot Rod Charlie's weight was 56.5 kilograms in the race which is approximately 125 pounds)	William Buick	
Mar 26, 2022	Dubai World Cup	Meydan (UAE)	I	2000 metres (Note: Distance for the event was approximately 1 1/4 miles)	2	(1 3/4 lengths)	2:04.97	4.00 (Note: Hot Rod Charlie final odds with British Bookmakers were 4/1 odds-on since gambling is prohibited in the United Arab Emirates)	122 lbs (Note: Hot Rod Charlie's weight was 55.0 kilograms in the race which is approximately 122 pounds)	Flavien Prat	
Jun 18, 2022	Salvator Mile	Monmouth Park	III	1 mile	2	(head)	1:35.79	0.30*	124 lbs	Mike E. Smith	
Aug 6, 2022	Whitney Stakes	Saratoga	I	1 1/8 miles	3	(2 lengths)	1:48.97	4.00	124 lbs	Flavien Prat	
Oct 1, 2022	Lukas Classic Stakes	Churchill Downs	II	1 1/8 miles	1	head	1:49.77	1.33*	125 lbs	Tyler Gaffalione	
Nov 5, 2022	Breeders' Cup Classic	Keeneland	I	1 1/4 miles	6	(15 lengths)	2:00.05	16.98	126 lbs	Tyler Gaffalione	

Legend:
Dirt Turf
Notes:
An (*) asterisk after the odds means Hot Rod Charlie was the post-time favorite.

== Pedigree ==
Pedigree of Hot Rod Charlie, bay colt, foaled April 11, 2018
Sire Oxbow 2010	Awesome Again (CAN); 1994	Deputy Minister	Vice Regent
Sire Oxbow 2010	Awesome Again (CAN); 1994	Deputy Minister	Mint Copy
Sire Oxbow 2010	Awesome Again (CAN); 1994	Primal Force	Blushing Groom
Sire Oxbow 2010	Awesome Again (CAN); 1994	Primal Force	Prime Prospect
Sire Oxbow 2010	Tizamazing; 2002	Cee's Tizzy	Relaunch
Sire Oxbow 2010	Tizamazing; 2002	Cee's Tizzy	Tizly
Sire Oxbow 2010	Tizamazing; 2002	Cee's Song	Seattle Song
Sire Oxbow 2010	Tizamazing; 2002	Cee's Song	Lonely Dancer
Dam Indian Miss 2002	Indian Charlie; 1995	In Excess	Siberian Express
Dam Indian Miss 2002	Indian Charlie; 1995	In Excess	Kantado
Dam Indian Miss 2002	Indian Charlie; 1995	Soviet Sojourn	Leo Castelli
Dam Indian Miss 2002	Indian Charlie; 1995	Soviet Sojourn	Political Parfait
Dam Indian Miss 2002	Glacken's Girl; 2005	Smoke Glacken	Two Punch
Dam Indian Miss 2002	Glacken's Girl; 2005	Smoke Glacken	Majesty's Crown
Dam Indian Miss 2002	Glacken's Girl; 2005	Lady Diplomat	Silver Deputy
Dam Indian Miss 2002	Glacken's Girl; 2005	Lady Diplomat	Mercedes Mist
