= Golden Gate Handicap =

Golden Gate Handicap may refer to:

- Golden Gate Handicap (Dirt), the former Berkeley Handicap renamed in 2023 and held at Golden Gate Fields
- Golden Gate Handicap (Turf), a discontinued turf event at Golden Gate Fields
