= All American Stakes =

- Class: Listed
- Location: Golden Gate Fields; Berkeley, California
- Inaugurated: 1968
- Race type: Thoroughbred - Flat racing
- Website: www.goldengatefields.com

Race information
- Distance: 1 Mile
- Surface: Tapeta
- Track: left-handed
- Qualification: Three-year-olds & older
- Weight: Assigned
- Purse: $100,000 (2020)

The All American Stakes is a Listed American Thoroughbred race for horses three-years-old and older over a distance of one mile on the turf at Golden Gate Fields, Berkeley, California. It currently offers a purse of $100,000.

== History ==
The event was inaugurated in 1968 on dirt at a distance of six furlongs as the All American Handicap. After the racetrack installed a turf course in 1972 the event was moved to the grass over a distance of 5 furlongs and stayed that way until 1978. In 1997 the event revert to the dirt.

The event was held at the defunct Bay Meadows Racetrack between 2001 and 2005 and was renamed during that period as the Seabiscuit Handicap and Seabiscuit Breeders' Cup Handicap.

In 2006 the race was returned to Golden Gate Fields and in 2007 the synthetic All Weather track called Tapeta was installed at the track.

The event had several distance changes during the years.

In 2020 the event was downgraded to Listed.

== Records ==
Speed record:

- 1:36.14- G G Ryder (2015)

Most wins:

- 2 - G G Ryder (2015, 2017)
- 2 - Summer Hit (2013, 2014)
- 2 - Yougottawanna (2004, 2005)

Most wins by a jockey:

- 7 - Russell Baze (1981, 1982, 1998, 1999, 2004, 2013, 2014)

Most wins by a trainer:

- 9 - Jerry Hollendorfer (1999, 2004, 2005, 2011, 2013, 2014, 2015, 2017, 2019)

Most wins by an owner:

- 5 - Jerry Hollendorfer (2011, 2013, 2014, 2015, 2017)

== Winners since 1973 ==
Year	Winner	Age	Jockey	Trainer	Owner	Time	Dist. (fur).	Purse	Grade
All American Stakes
2020	Restrainedvengence	5	Kent Desormeaux	Val Brinkerhoff	Kelly Brinkerhoff & Bob Grayson Jr.	1:36.43	8	$100,900	Listed
2019	Grecian Fire	5	William Antongeorgi III	Jerry Hollendorfer	KMN Racing LLC	1:36.49	8	$100,000	3
2018	The Lieutenant	5	Tyler Conner	Michael W. McCarthy	William & Suzanne Warren Jr.	1:36.60	8	$100,000	3
2017	G. G. Ryder	6	Irving Orozco	Jerry Hollendorfer	Jerry Hollendorfer & George Todaro	1:37.48.	8	$100,315	3
2016	¶ Living The Life (IRE)	6	Drayden Van Dyke	Gary Mandella	HnR Nothhaft	1:37.56	8	$101,575	3
2015	G. G. Ryder	4	Ricardo Gonzalez	Jerry Hollendorfer	Jerry Hollendorfer & George Todaro	1:36.14	8	$100,315	3
2014	Summer Hit	5	Russell Baze	Jerry Hollendorfer	Jerry Hollendorfer & John Carver	1:38.01	8	$100,210	3
2013	Summer Hit	4	Russell Baze	Jerry Hollendorfer	Jerry Hollendorfer & John Carver	1:44.09	8 1/2	$100,000	3
2012	Hudson Landing	5	Frank Alvarado	Blaine D. Wright	Chappell Alpine Farm	1:45.31	8 1/2	$100,000	3
2011	Our Nautique (NZ)	6	Kevin Krigger	Jerry Hollendorfer	Jerry Hollendorfer & Ron Tunnicliffe	1:51.78	9	$100,260	3
2010	Cigar Man	5	Juan J. Hernandez	Vladimir Cerin	Ron Manzani & Russel Sarno	1:49.78	9	$100,900	3
2009	Race not held								
2008	Delightful Kiss	4	Calvin Borel	Pete D. Anderson	Hobeau Farm	1:49.54	9	$211,800	3
2007	McCann's Mojave	7	Frank Alvarado	Steven Specht	Mike Willman	1:50.04	9	$150,000	3
All American Handicap
2006	Buzzards Bay	4	Jose Valdivia Jr.	Ronald W. Ellis	Gary Broad	1:47.11	9	$150,000	3
Seabiscuit Breeders' Cup Handicap
† 2005	Yougottawanna	6	Jason Lumpkins	Jerry Hollendorfer	Peter Redekop	1:41.42	8 1/2	$86,250	3
† 2004	Yougottawanna	5	Russell Baze	Jerry Hollendorfer	Peter Redekop	1:40.08	8 1/2	$86,250	3
Seabiscuit Handicap
† 2003	Reba's Gold	6	Chance J. Rollins	Dan L. Hendricks	Creston Farm	1:41.63	8 1/2	$100,000	3
All American Handicap
† 2002	Palmeiro	4	Jason Lumpkins	John W. Sadler	Jerry & Ann Moss	1:42.31	8 1/2	$150,000	3
† 2001	Euchre	5	Jason Lumpkins	Robert J. Frankel	Stronach Stables	1:41.69	8 1/2	$150,000	3
2000	Peach Flat	6	Jose Valdivia Jr.	Alfredo Marquez	Ronal & Susie Anson	1:42.48	8 1/2	$125,000	3
1999	Worldly Ways (GB)	5	Russell Baze	Jerry Hollendorfer	Golden Eagle Farm	1:40.62	8 1/2	$100,000	3
1998	Wild Wonder	4	Russell Baze	Greg Gilchrist	VHW Stables	1:41.33	8 1/2	$100,000	3
1997	Mister Fire Eyes (IRE)	5	Ronald J. Warren Jr.	James M. Hilling	Henry E. Pabst	1:41.28	8 1/2	$100,000	3
1996	Tzar Rodney (FR)	4	Thomas M. Chapman	Ron McAnally	Tadahiro Hotehama	1:49.74	9	$100,000	3
1995	Bluegrass Prince (IRE)	4	Thomas M. Chapman	Rodney Rash	Gary A. Tanaka	1:49.01	9	$125,000	3
1994	Slew of Damascus	6	Thomas M. Chapman	Craig Roberts	E. Harbeston, G. Losh, V. Naccara	1:43.75	8 1/2	$100,000	3
1993	Never Black	6	Corey Nakatani	Robert J. Frankel	Edmund A. Gann	1:42.53	8 1/2	$100,000	3
1992	Gum	6	Gary Boulanger	Melvin F. Stute	The Hat Ranch	1:41.73	8 1/2	$100,000	3
1991	Forty Niner Days	4	Timothy T. Doocy	Roger M. Stein	Sidney Field	1:42.70	8 1/2	$100,000	3
1990	River Master	4	Robbie Davis	Charles E. Whittingham	Cardiff Stud Farm, Red Baron's Barn, & Timestable	1:43.40	8 1/2	$100,000	3
1989	Simply Majestic	5	Ronald D. Hansen	John Parisella	Theodore M. Sabarese	1:42.40	8 1/2	$100,000	3
1988	Ifrad	6	Thomas M. Chapman	Charles E. Whittingham	Sidney Port & C. E. Whittingham	1:43.40	8 1/2	$100,000	3
1987	Mangaki	6	Timothy T. Doocy	Charles J. Jenda	Chrys S. Chrys & Roger Malin	1:34.00	8	$100,000	3
1986	Clever Song	5	Fernando Toro	John Gosden	M J B Stable	1:28.00	7 1/2	$100,000	3
1985	Hegemony (IRE)	4	Darrel McHargue	Harris Gary	Deburgh-Malibu Vally Fm-Mckann-Mrkn	1:28.40	7 1/2	$100,000	3
1984	Ancestral (IRE)	4	Ray Sibille	Jerry M. Fanning	Craig B. Singer	1:29.20	7 1/2	$75,000	
1983	Major Sport	6	Thomas M. Chapman	Ron McAnally	Elmendorf	1:29.40	7 1/2	$75,000	
1982	Crews Hill (GB)	6	Russell Baze	John Gosden	Chris Henry	1:29.40	7 1/2	$100,000	
1981	Borrego Sun	4	Russell Baze	Emmett L. Campbell			7 1/2	$40,000	
1980	California Express	5	Jorge Aragon	Ike Orr		1:29.60	7 1/2	$30,000	
1979	Struttin' George	5	Thomas M. Chapman	Walter R. Greenman		1:28.00	7 1/2	$20,000	
1978	Maheras	5	William Mahorney	Lin Wheeler	Bruce McNall	0:56.20	5	$25,000	
1977	L'Natural	4	Raul Caballero	C. B. Hixon	G. M. Warwick	0:56.00	5	$25,000	
1976	Shirley's Champion	5	Frank Olivares	Robert Paul King	Vicgray Farm (Victor H. Graber)	0:56.80	5	$25,000	
1975	Cherry River	5	William Mahorney	Douglas Oliver	Stanley & Douglas Oliver	0:56.80	5	$25,000	
1974	Tragic Isle	5	Francisco Mena		Kurt Nork	1:08.80	6	$25,000	
1973	Selecting	4	Roy Yaka		Emerald Isle Stables	1:09.00	6	$25,000	

Legend:

All Weather Track (Tapeta)	Dirt
Turf	Race name

Notes:
¶ Filly/Mare
† Held at Bay Meadows Race Track

=== Earlier known winners ===
- 1972 - Long Position
- 1971 - Dizzy Babe
- 1970 - Royal Fols
- 1969 - Royal Fols
- 1968 - Lucky PJ
