= Gold Rush Stakes =

- Class: Ungraded Stakes
- Location: Golden Gate Fields; Berkeley, California
- Race type: Thoroughbred - Flat racing
- Website: www.goldengatefields.com

Race information
- Distance: 1 Mile (8 Furlongs)
- Track: Synthetic, left-handed
- Qualification: Two-year-olds
- Weight: Assigned
- Purse: $75,000

The Gold Rush Stakes is an American Thoroughbred horse race for two-year-olds run at Golden Gate Fields in mid-December. An ungraded stakes set at distance of one mile on Tapeta Footings, the Gold Rush currently offers a purse of $75,000.

The race, named for the California Gold Rush of 1849, is a steppingstone to the $100,000 Golden Gate Derby (gr. III).

== Past winners ==
- 2016 – Colonel Samsen (1:38.59) (Juan J. Hernandez) (trainer Eoin G. Harty)
- 2015 – Mana Strike (1:38.36) (Pedro M. Terrero) (trainer Frank Lucarelli)
- 2014 – Stand and Salute (1:39.26) (Russell Baze) (trainer Jerry Hollendorfer)
- 2013 – Exit Stage Left (1:38.53) (Russell Baze) (trainer Jerry Hollendorfer)
- 2012 – Zeewat (1:38:13) (Russell Baze) (trainer Jerry Hollendorfer)
- 2011 – Russian Greek (1:39.18) (Inoel Beato) (trainer Jerry Hollendorfer)
- 2010 – Positive Response (1:37.75)
- 2009 – Sourdough Sam (1:39.39)
- 2008 – Merus Miami (1:38.48) (Alex Bisono)
- 2007 – El Gato Malo (1:37.62) (Patrick Valenzuela)
- 2006 – Pure As Gold (Jon Court)
- 2005 –
- 2004 – Dover Dere (1:36.55) (Ignacio Puglisi)
- 2003 – Skipaslew (Eric Saint-Martin)
- 2002 – Spensive
- 2001 – Danthebluegrassman (1:34.69)
- 2000 – I’madrifter
- 1995 – Petionville
- 1994 – Bai Brun
- 1992 – Big Pal
- 1990 – Restless Con (won the 1990 Haskell Invitational Handicap)
- 1989 – Avenging Force (Roberto Gonzalez)
- 1988 – Prospectors Gamble (a leading sire of 1999)
