= H. Allen Jerkens Memorial Stakes =

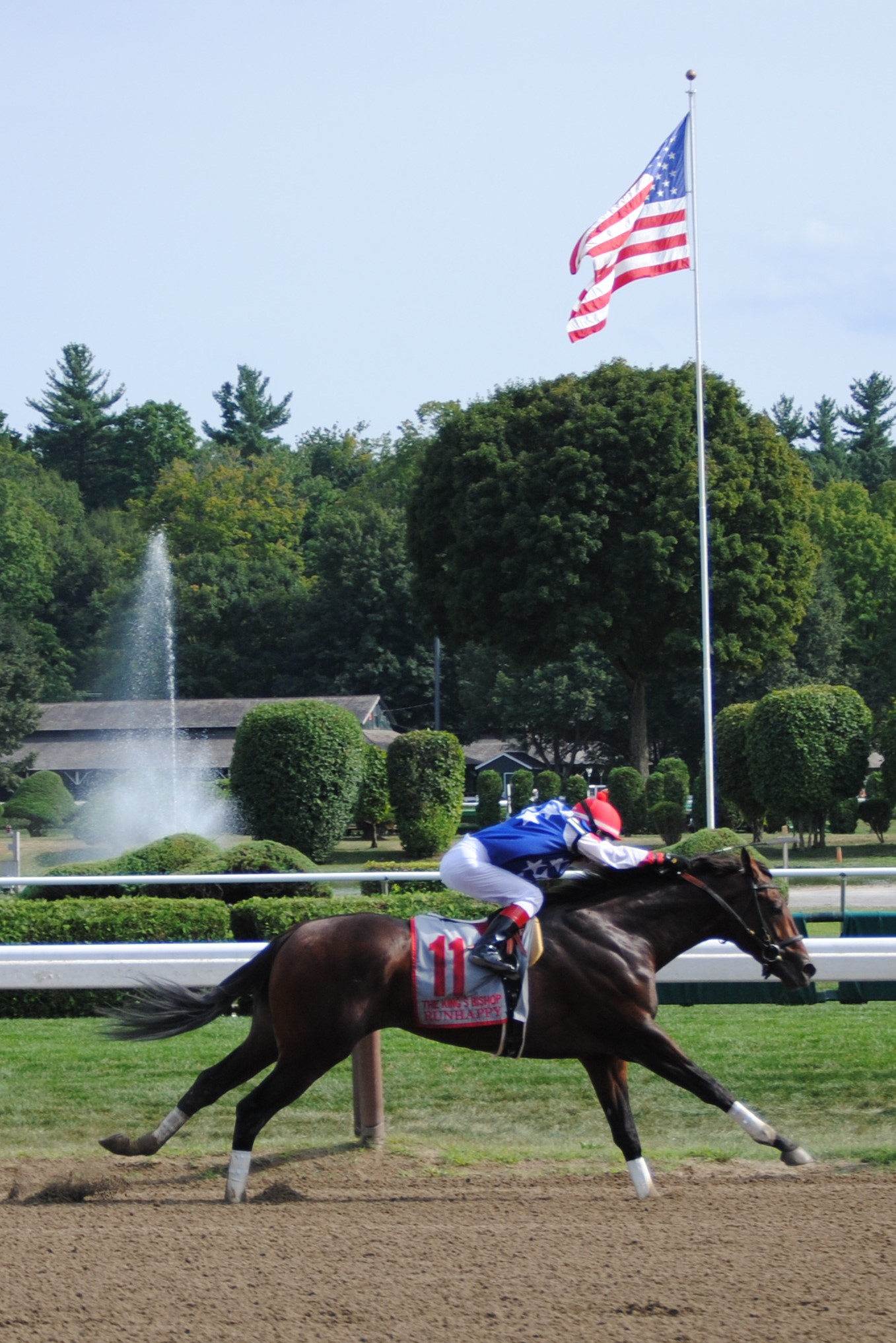
- Runhappy winning the 2015 King's Bishop
- Class: Grade I
- Location: Saratoga Race Course; Saratoga Springs, New York, United States
- Inaugurated: 1984 (as King's Bishop Stakes)
- Race type: Thoroughbred – Flat racing
- Sponsor: Gallery Racing (2020)
- Website: NYRA

Race information
- Distance: 7 furlongs
- Surface: Dirt
- Track: left-handed
- Qualification: Three-year-olds
- Weight: 124 lbs with allowances
- Purse: $500,000 (2021)

The H. Allen Jerkens Memorial Stakes is a Grade I American thoroughbred horse race for three-year-olds run over a distance of seven furlongs on the dirt held in August at Saratoga Race Course in Saratoga Springs, New York. The current purse for the event is $500,000.

== History ==
The inaugural running of the event was on 18 August 1984 as the seventh race on the undercard of Travers Stakes day as The King's Bishop Stakes and was won by Commemorate who was trained by Hall of Fame trainer Lazaro Barrera in a time of 1:22 3/5. King's Bishop was originally owned by Houston Astros founding president Craig F. Cullinan Jr. and trained by H. Allen Jerkens, who trained the horse to wins in the 1973 Carter Handicap and Fall Highweight Handicap for Allaire du Pont.

The event was not held in 1986.

In 1987 the event was classified as Grade III, upgraded to Grade II in 1992 and since 1999 the race has been a Grade I event.

In 2017 the New York Racing Association renamed the race for the late Hall of Fame trainer H. Allen Jerkens, who over a career spanning seven decades, his horses had upset racing champions – such as Onion's victory over Secretariat in the 1973 Whitney Handicap – earning him the nickname "the Giant Killer".

Several winners of the race have gone on to win American Champion Sprint Horse honors that same year, including Housebuster (1990), Lost in the Fog (2005), Runhappy (2015) and Drefong (2016). Hard Spun (2007) went on to top that year's World's Best Racehorse Rankings for three-year-old sprinters.

== Records ==
Speed record:

- 1:20.54 – Runhappy (2015)

Margins:

- 5 1/2 lengths – Tale of the Cat (1997)

Most wins by a jockey:

- 4 – John Velazquez (2002, 2006, 2010, 2019)
- 4 – Mike E. Smith (1991, 1992, 1993, 2016)

Most wins by a trainer:

- 5 – D. Wayne Lukas (1985, 1989, 1992, 1994, 1996)

Most wins by an owner:

- 2 – Lloyd R. French Jr. (1985, 1989)
- 2 – Michael Tabor (1996, 2004)
- 2 – Klaravich Stables (2017, 2024)

== Winners ==
Year	Winner	Jockey	Trainer	Owner	Distance	Time	Purse	Grade	Ref
H. Allen Jerkens Memorial Stakes
2026	Englishman	José Ortiz	Cherie DeVaux	CRK Stables, LLC	7 furlongs	1:20.71	$500,000	I	
2025	Patch Adams	Luis Saez	Brad H. Cox	WinStar Farm & China Horse Club	7 furlongs	1:21.61	$500,000	I	
2024	Domestic Product	Flavien Prat	Chad C. Brown	Klaravich Stables	7 furlongs	1:21.71	$500,000	I	
2023	One in Vermillion	Irad Ortiz Jr.	Esteban Martinez	Jonathan Kalman	7 furlongs	1:22.63	$485,000	I	
2022	Jack Christopher	José Ortiz	Chad C. Brown	Peter M. Brant, Coolmore Stud, Gerry Isbister, Gerald Isbister, & Jim Bakke	7 furlongs	1:21.15	$500,000	I	
2021	Jackie's Warrior	Joel Rosario	Steven Asmussen	J Kirk & Judy Robison	7 furlongs	1:21.39	$490,000	I	
2020	Echo Town	Ricardo Santana Jr.	Steven Asmussen	L & N Racing	7 furlongs	1:22.53	$300,000	I	
2019	Mind Control	John R. Velazquez	Gregory D. Sacco	Red Oak Stable (Brunetti), Madaket Stables	7 furlongs	1:21.43	$500,000	I	
2018	Promises Fulfilled	Luis Saez	Dale L. Romans	Robert J. Baron	7 furlongs	1:21.44	$501,500	I	
2017	Practical Joke	Joel Rosario	Chad C. Brown	Klaravich Stables & William H. Lawrence	7 furlongs	1:21.96	$500,000	I	
King's Bishop Stakes
2016	Drefong	Mike E. Smith	Bob Baffert	Charles Chu	7 furlongs	1:21.25	$500,000	I	
2015	Runhappy	Edgar S. Prado	Maria Borell	James McIngvale	7 furlongs	1:20.54	$500,000	I	
2014	The Big Beast	Javier Castellano	Anthony W. Dutrow	Alex & JoAnn Lieblong	7 furlongs	1:22.35	$500,000	I	
2013	Capo Bastone	Irad Ortiz Jr.	Todd A. Pletcher	Eclipse Thoroughbred Partners	7 furlongs	1:22.22	$500,000	I	
2012	Willy Beamin	Alan Garcia	Richard E. Dutrow Jr.	James A. Riccio	7 furlongs	1:22.02	$500,000	I	
2011	Caleb's Posse	Rajiv Maragh	Donnie K. Von Hemel	McNeil Stables & Cheyenne Stables	7 furlongs	1:21.59	$250,000	I	
2010	Discreetly Mine	John R. Velazquez	Todd A. Pletcher	E. Paul Robsham Stables	7 furlongs	1:23.16	$250,000	I	
2009	†Capt. Candyman Can	Javier Castellano	Ian R. Wilkes	Joseph Rauch, David Zell	7 furlongs	1:22.35	$300,000	I	
2008	Visionaire	Alan Garcia	Michael R. Matz	Team Valor & Vision Racing	7 furlongs	1:21.94	$250,000	I	
2007	Hard Spun	Mario G. Pino	J. Larry Jones	Fox Hill Farms	7 furlongs	1:22.34	$250,000	I	
2006	Henny Hughes	John R. Velazquez	Kiaran P. McLaughlin	Zabeel Racing	7 furlongs	1:21.96	$250,000	I	
2005	Lost in the Fog	Russell Baze	Greg Gilchrist	Harry J. Aleo	7 furlongs	1:22.56	$250,000	I	
2004	Pomeroy	Edgar S. Prado	Patrick L. Biancone	Michael Tabor & Derrick Smith	7 furlongs	1:20.99	$250,000	I	
2003	Valid Video	Joe Bravo	Dennis J. Manning	Mack Fehsenfeld	7 furlongs	1:22.14	$200,000	I	
2002	Gygistar	John R. Velazquez	Mark A. Hennig	Edward P. Evans	7 furlongs	1:22.85	$200,000	I	
2001	Squirtle Squirt	Jerry D. Bailey	Robert J. Frankel	David J. Lanzman	7 furlongs	1:21.97	$200,000	I	
2000	More Than Ready	Pat Day	Todd A. Pletcher	James T. Scatuorchio	7 furlongs	1:22.49	$200,000	I	
1999	Forestry	Chris Antley	Bob Baffert	Aaron U. & Marie Jones	7 furlongs	1:21.00	$200,000	I	
1998	Secret Firm	Edgar S. Prado	H. Graham Motion	Mea Culpa Stables	7 furlongs	1:22.78	$200,000	II	
1997	Tale of the Cat	Julie Krone	John H. Forbes	Phantom House Farm	7 furlongs	1:21.71	$150,000	II	
1996	Honour and Glory	José A. Santos	D. Wayne Lukas	Michael Tabor	7 furlongs	1:21.78	$108,200	II	
1995	Top Account	Pat Day	Neil J. Howard	William S. Farish III	7 furlongs	1:22.50	$113,500	II	
1994	Chimes Band	Jerry D. Bailey	D. Wayne Lukas	Fares Farm	7 furlongs	1:21.80	$109,500	II	
1993	Mi Cielo	Mike E. Smith	Peter M. Vestal	Tom M. Carey	7 furlongs	1:21.60	$123,800	II	
1992	Salt Lake	Mike E. Smith	D. Wayne Lukas	William T. Young	7 furlongs	1:21.40	$122,400	II	
1991	Take Me Out	Mike E. Smith	William I. Mott	Bertram R. Firestone	7 furlongs	1:21.60	$124,000	III	
1990	Housebuster	Craig Perret	Jimmy Croll	Robert P. Levy	7 furlongs	1:21.80	$90,150	III	
1989	Houston	Pat Day	D. Wayne Lukas	Lloyd R. French Jr.	7 furlongs	1:22.00	$86,550	III	
1988	King's Nest	Chris McCarron	Richard E. Dutrow Sr.	Sandra D. Bender	7 furlongs	1:21.80	$88,800	III	
1987	Templar Hill	Chris McCarron	Paul D. Seefeldt	Ervin Kowitz	7 furlongs	1:23.00	$86,150	III	
1986	Race not held								
1985	Pancho Villa	Darrel G. McHargue	D. Wayne Lukas	Lloyd R. French Jr.	7 furlongs	1:22.20	$55,900	Listed	
1984	Commemorate	Frank Lovato Jr.	Laz Barrera	Windfields Farm	7 furlongs	1:22.60	$55,700	Listed	

Notes:
† In the 2009 event Vineyard Haven was first past the post but disqualified for drifting out in the straight and twice bumping Capt. Candyman Can. Capt. Candyman Can was declared the winner.

== See also ==
List of American and Canadian Graded races
