= Tiburon Handicap =

The Tiburon Handicap is an American Thoroughbred ungraded stakes race for three-year-old fillies run early each year at Golden Gate Fields. Set at a distance of six furlongs, the sprint now offers a purse of $75,000.

The Tiburon is named for the once fishing village across the San Francisco Bay from the track. The word "tiburon" is Spanish for "shark."

== Past winners ==
- 2009 - Ultra Blend (Roberto Gonzalez)
- 2008 - Heaven on Hold (Russell Baze)
- 2007 - Glorification (Jason Lumpkins)
- 2006 - Press Camp

- 1992 - Gum (Patrick Valenzuela) (Gum holds the record at Golden Gate Fields for this distance: 1:41 1/5, which in Gum's time, was one and one/sixteenth mile on the turf run over the Lakeside Turf Course.)
