= Warner Bros. Ranch =

Backlot set located in Burbank, California

Coordinates: 34°09′32″N 118°20′44″W

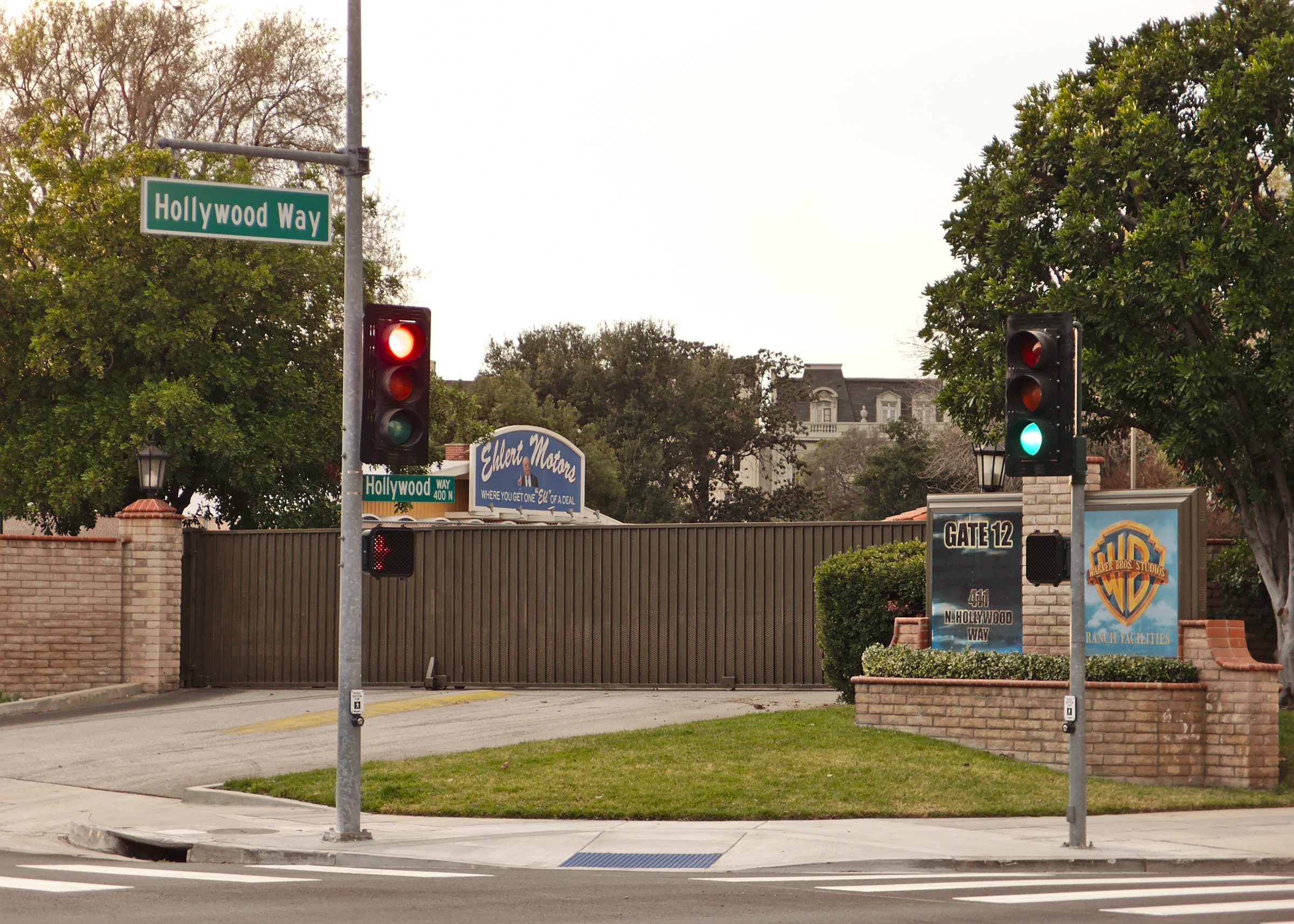
- Gate 12 of the lot in 2015

- Location within the Los Angeles metropolitan area
- Location: 411 North Hollywood Way; Burbank, California, U.S.

History
- Built: 1934; 92 years ago

Site notes
- Governing body: Private
- Owner: Columbia Pictures (1934–1990); Warner Bros. (1972–2023); Worthe Real Estate Group (1999–2023); Stockbridge Capital Group (2023)

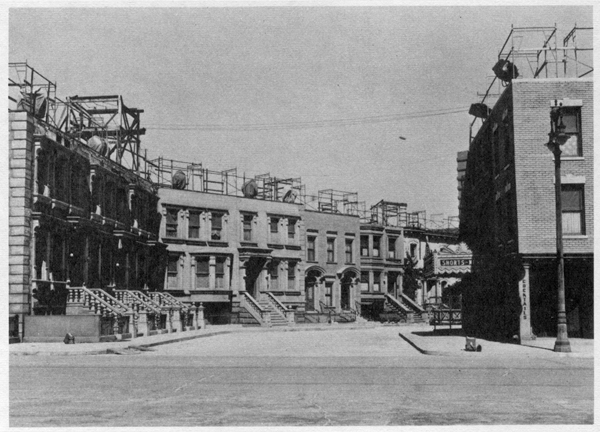
A view of Brownstone Street on the former Columbia Ranch, Burbank

The Warner Bros. Ranch (formerly the Columbia Ranch) is a movie ranch located at 411 North Hollywood Way in Burbank, California. Opened in the 1930s, it was used as the backdrop for films and television shows by Columbia Pictures and Warner Bros. Pictures. The majority of the houses and buildings were originally just facades; Columbia owned and operated the Ranch from 1934 to 1971, when they merged with Warner Bros. Studios Burbank. When Warner Bros. Entertainment became sole owner of the Lot in 1989, all of the structures were enclosed, with some getting a full interior.

== History ==
Columbia Pictures, with limited space at its Hollywood headquarters at Sunset and Gower, had been forced to rent neighboring movie studios' backlots for outdoor shooting. By the end of 1934, this problem was solved when studio head Harry Cohn acquired a 40-acre (160,000 m^{2}) lot in Burbank at the corner of Hollywood Way and Oak Street. The site was an ideal movie ranch as it was rural enough at the time to be landscaped as the studio wished.

Columbia Pictures used the ranch as a backdrop for almost all of its outdoor scenes. Many television and film serials, such as Batman, Captain Midnight, Blondie and The Three Stooges, were filmed on the lot. In the 1960s, Columbia's television division Screen Gems used the Ranch to film numerous shows. Most interiors were shot at Columbia's main studio at Sunset and Gower, and sometimes other locations or studios. The streets were constructed and arranged to allow shooting at multiple angles to create the illusion of a much larger area, which was quite significant for the small studio at the time. Some of the sets on New York Street and Western Streets had actual interiors, called 'Practical Sets' which allowed for a single camera movement from outside to inside, or vice versa.

In 1970, a catastrophic fire destroyed a quarter of the lot. Half of the Western set, the Colonial/European set and parts of the Blondie street burned, including the Blondie house (which was also used as the Father Knows Best home). Although the sets were quickly rebuilt, two additional fires destroyed much of the original features of the ranch, including New York Street, Modern Street and half of the Boston townhouses.

In 1972, Columbia and Warner Bros., both in financial trouble, entered into a joint venture to form The Burbank Studios on the site of the massive Warner lot, one mile south of the ranch.

In 1990, Columbia moved its production facilities to the historic MGM studios in Culver City. As a result, Warner gained ownership of the lot and renamed Warner Bros. Ranch. The fountain in the park, built around 1935, was seen in the opening credits of Friends, as well as in Hocus Pocus, 1776, The Monkees, Bewitched, and various other Screen Gems television shows from the 1960s.

The Ranch lot had served as the headquarters of Warner Bros. Animation from 2007 to 2023.

== Sale of ranch, redevelopment, and lease back ==
In 2019, it was announced that Warner Bros. would sell the Ranch property to Worthe Real Estate Group and Stockbridge Real Estate Fund as part of a larger deal to be completed in 2023 in time to mark its 100th anniversary.

Warner Bros. assumed occupancy of the redeveloped parcel in 2025 following the transfer of ownership in 2023 and subsequent $500 million redevelopment led by Worthe. Another nearby campus has plans to include two office buildings built by Frank Gehry with Warner as long-term tenants.

In early 2019, the Friends fountain was moved to the WB main lot and became a part of its studio tour since 2020. In October 2023, the Blondie street homes and park featuring brownstone facades and swimming pool were demolished to be replaced by a parking area, offices and 16 new stages as part of the lot remodel and completion by 2025. The Ranch Lot Studios reopened at Warner Bros. Studios Burbank on March 18, 2026.

On September 7, 2023, it was announced that investment firms Worthe and Stockbridge completed their acquisition of Warner Bros. Ranch. This was possible after obtaining a loan of $480 million obtained from companies belonging to Apollo Global Management.

On October 26, 2023, the demolition was completed on the backlot, with Blondie Street and Park Blvd leveled. All that remains are the sound stages at the back of the lot and the church façade near where the Bewitched house stood. During demolition, an episode of Young Sheldon was filmed depicting a tornado causing damage.

It was announced in July 2026, The Ranch will host the International Broadcast Center for the 2028 Summer Olympics and Paralympics, while Hollywood Park Studios by SoFi Stadium will host the Main Press Center.

== List of films and shows ==
The list of Columbia films and Screen Gems/Columbia Pictures Television shows produced at the ranch include: Father Knows Best, The Donna Reed Show, Dennis the Menace, Hazel, Bewitched, Gidget, I Dream of Jeannie, The Monkees, The Flying Nun, Here Come the Brides, The Partridge Family, The Hathaways, The Waltons, F Troop (for Warner Bros. Television), Lost Horizon, High Noon, Mr. Deeds Goes to Town, You Were Never Lovelier, Tokyo Joe, Lethal Weapon, National Lampoon's Christmas Vacation, WandaVision, Agatha All Along, The Wild One, The Middle, Young Sheldon, The Three Stooges films 'Til Death, The Wrecking Crew, and Autumn Leaves.
