= Ingeborg Gerdes =

German-American photographer (1938–2020)

- Born: 1938; Merseburg, Germany
- Died: June 20, 2020 (aged 81–82); Emeryville, California
- Known for: photography

Ingeborg Gerdes (1938 – 20 June 2020) was a German-American photographer.

== Early life and education ==
Born in Merseburg, Germany in 1938, she earned a degree in economics from Heidelberg University in 1968. She received an MFA degree from the San Francisco Art Institute in 1970.

== Career ==
Gerdes began taking photos in the mid 1960s when she had come to the United States with her husband Hartmut Gerdes. She is said to have arrived in San Francisco after a road trip with a bag full of exposed film. Installed in San Francisco, she began to photograph the neighborhoods of Russian Hill and Golden Gate Fields. Within five years of her 1970 graduation from the San Francisco Art Institute, Gerdes was part of the exhibition “Women Photographers: A Historical Survey” at the San Francisco Museum of Modern Art.

Gerdes died on June 20, 2020, in Emeryville, California. She is buried in Berlin, Germany.

== Collections ==
- Cantor Arts Center
- Harvard Art Museums
- Norton Simon Museum
- Oakland Museum
- Portland Art Museum
- San Francisco Museum of Modern Art
- Smithsonian American Art Museum
- Museum of Modern Art, New York
