= Half Moon Bay Stakes =

The Half Moon Bay Stakes is an American ungraded stakes race for Thoroughbred horses held on the grass at Golden Gate Fields in Albany, California. For fillies and mares, three-year-olds and up, it is run at a distance of eight and a half furlongs on the turf and offers a purse of $50,000.

The Half Moon is named for a small bay on the coast below San Francisco famous for its pumpkins, as well as a recently discovered monster surf wave called the "Maverick".

== Past winners ==
- 2006 - Private Banking
- 2005 - Strong Faith
- 2004 - (Not run due to cutbacks?)
- 2003 - Blue Blood Boot
- 2002 - World Light
- 2001 -
- 2000 - Heritage of Hall
- 1999 - Wind Tunnel
- 1998 - Highland Gold (raced at Bay Meadows)
