= Pacific Heights Stakes =

The Pacific Heights Stakes is run each year at Golden Gate Fields in the San Francisco Bay Area. Named for a hilly section of the city of San Francisco, the race is restricted to California bred fillies and mares, 3 years old and up, and run at a distance of 8 furlongs on the turf.

An ungraded stakes, it offers a purse of $75,000.

The 2008 Pacific Heights was run on Golden Gate Fields' synthetic Tapeta racing surface.

== Past winners ==
- 2011 - Antares World (Frank Alvarado)
- 2010 - Catsalot (Julien Couton)
- 2009 - Lady Railrider (Frank Alvarado)
- 2008 - Lady Railrider (Frank Alvarado)
- 2007 - Somethinaboutlaura (Russell Baze)
- 2006 - Somethinaboutlaura (Russell Baze)
