= Tuzla Handicap =

Californian horse race

The Tuzla Handicap is an American Thoroughbred horse race for older fillies and mares run at the Santa Anita Park in Arcadia, California at the beginning of the year. A Grade IIIT stakes race for four-year-olds and up, it's set at a distance of 1 mile on the turf course and offers a purse of $100,000.

The Tuzla is named for the French-bred filly Tuzla who, out of 26 starts, won 12 and placed in 6. Born in 1994, she was a Grade I winner and retired a millionaire.

== Winners ==
- 2009 – Foxysox (GB) (6) (Rafael Bejarano)
- 2008 - Trick's Pic (Victor Espinoza)
- 2007 - Singalong (5) (Awarded the win after the disqualification of Conveyor's Angel.)
- 2006 - Ticker Tape (5) (Kent Desormeaux)
- 2005 - Good Student (ARG) (5)
- 2004 - Fudge Fatale (4) (Jose Valdivia, Jr.)
