= Elias Bowie =

American racing driver (1910–2005)

- Born: May 10, 1910; San Antonio, Texas, U.S.
- Died: January 26, 2005 (aged 94); San Francisco, California, U.S.
- Achievements: First African-American to start a top-level NASCAR race

NASCAR Cup Series career
- 1 race run over 1 year
- First race: 1955 Race No. 30 (Bay Meadows Racetrack)
Wins	Top tens	Poles
0	0	0

Elias Abraham Bowie Jr. (May 10, 1910 – January 26, 2005) was an American professional stock car racing driver. He is credited as being the first African-American to start a top-level NASCAR race, doing so in 1955 at Bay Meadows Racetrack.

== Racing career ==
Bowie made his lone NASCAR Grand National Series start on July 31, 1955. Driving a Cadillac at Bay Meadows Racetrack, a mile-long dirt track, Bowie completed 172 of 252 laps and finished 28th of 34 cars. He was noted for having the largest pit crew of all the drivers in the race.

== Personal life ==
Although his date of birth is sometimes noted as 1909 or 1914, Bowie was born in 1910 in San Antonio, Texas, to a laundress and a hotel porter. He was a transportation entrepreneur in the San Francisco Bay, California area.

== Motorsports career results ==
=== NASCAR ===
(key) (Bold – Pole position awarded by qualifying time. Italics – Pole position earned by points standings or practice time. * – Most laps led.)

==== Strictly Stock/Grand National Series ====
NASCAR Grand National Series results
Year	Team	No.	Make	1	2	3	4	5	6	7	8	9	10	11	12	13	14	15	16	17	18	19	20	21	22	23	24	25	26	27	28	29	30	31	32	33	34	35	36	37	38	39	40	41	42	43	44	45	NGNC	Pts	Ref
1955	Elias Bowie	60	Cadillac	TCS	PBS	JSP	DAB	OSP	CLB	HBO	NWS	MGY	LAN	CLT	HCY	ASF	TUS	MAR	RCH	NCF	FOR	LIN	MCF	FON	AIR	CLT	PIF	CLB	AWS	MOR	ALS	NYF	SAN; 28	CLT	FOR	MAS	RSP	DAR	MGY	LAN	RSP	GPS	MAS	CLB	MAR	LVP	NWS	HBO	223rd	N/A	
