= Stockbridge Capital Group =

Private-equity estate investment company

Stockbridge Capital Group, LLC
- Type: Private
- Industry: Land development, Private Equity Real Estate
- Founder: Terry Fancher and Sol Raso
- Headquarters: San Francisco, California
- Total assets: $33.9 US billion
- Website: Official website

Stockbridge Capital Group is a private-equity real estate investment company based in San Francisco, led by Terry Fancher and Sol Raso. Currently, the company has approximately $34 billion in assets under management.

The company owns the Hollywood Park Casino in Inglewood, California which is located next door to SoFi Stadium and its surrounding development dubbed as Hollywood Park. Stockbridge purchased the property in July 2005 from Churchill Downs Incorporated for $260 million in cash and operated Hollywood Park Racetrack until 2013. Stockbridge also owns more than 200 manufactured home communities through Yes! Communities. They have received $1.3 billion in financing from Fannie Mae, which they used to acquire more manufactured homes. In 2016, Stockbridge sold part of Yes! to GIC Private Limited and the Pennsylvania Public School Employees' Retirement System (PSERS). Stockbridge in addition owns Bay Meadows, a master planned community in San Mateo, California that was formerly the site of Bay Meadows Racetrack. The company owns The Burbank Studios in Burbank, California, formerly NBC's NBC Studios in a joint venture with M. David Paul & Associates.

The firm formerly owned 140 New Montgomery known as the Pac Bell Building in San Francisco from 2007 until April 2016. It also formerly owned the SLS Las Vegas from October 2015 until April 2018.

In October 2019, Stockbridge Capital Group planned to raise up to $500 m (€453.5 m) for a new US real estate fund with value added.

In November 2019, Stockbridge Capital Group purchased a US commercial estate of 8.7 million sqft from Hillwood Development Company for $800 million (€725.1 m).

In June 2020, David Egan joined as senior vice president of Stockbridge Capital Group.
