= Bay Meadows (neighborhood) =

Neighborhood in San Mateo, CA, US

- Neighborhood
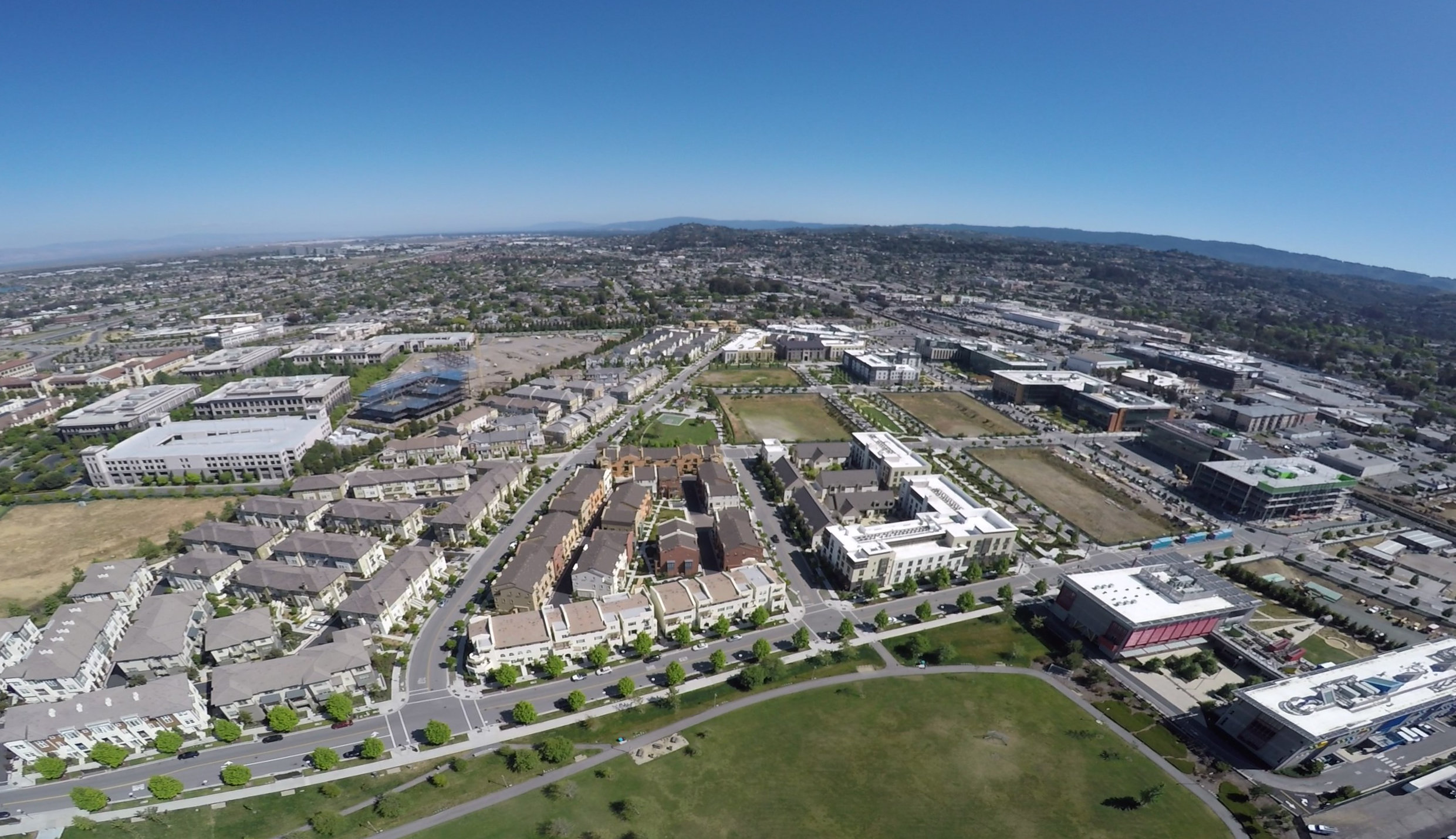
- Looking south over Bay Meadows II from above the community park

- Location in California
- Coordinates: 37.543361°N 122.297739°W
- Country: United States
- State: California
- County: San Mateo County
- Established: 2008

Area
  - Land: 83 acres (34 ha)
- Postal code: 94403
- Website: www.baymeadows.com

Bay Meadows is an 83-acre mixed-use, transit-oriented development in the City of San Mateo, California. Built on the site of a historic horse racing track from which it takes its name, the neighborhood is divided into station/mixed-use and residential districts, which are further divided into 18 development blocks. The station/mixed-use district is primarily adjacent to Delaware Street, the major north–south street through the neighborhood. Blocks in the residential district to the east of Delaware Street form communities within Bay Meadows II. As of 2019, 11 blocks have been developed. When it is complete, Bay Meadows II will have 1250 residential units, 1.25 million square feet of office space, 150,000 square feet of retail space, and 15 acres of parks

== Name ==
The name Bay Meadows comes from the former Bay Meadows Racetrack that it replaced. Many of the street and community names in Bay Meadows were selected during its design to acknowledge historically noteworthy jockeys, trainers, horses, events, and themes from the racetrack era, such as:

- Baze Rd
- Derby Ave
- Neves Rd
- Shoemaker Dr
- Hack Ross Ave
- Wayne Way

and others.

== Geography ==
Bay Meadows II is at the southern end of San Mateo, to the north of Franklin Parkway (with the exception of one community), east of the Caltrain rail line, south of the San Mateo Event Center, and west the Bay Meadows Phase I development bordering Saratoga Avenue and the Franklin Templeton campus. The neighborhood is entirely flat with no native water bodies.

== History ==
San Mateo approved the Bay Meadows Specific Plan in 1997 to redevelop land owned by the Bay Meadows Racetrack. The plan divided Bay Meadows into two areas: the 75 acre Redevelopment area (Phase I) and the 83 acres Main Track. Phase I was developed from late 1990s to mid-2000s. It was officially completed with construction of the Kaiser Medical Center.

Phase II was approved by San Mateo City Council in 2005 with an amendment to the Bay Meadows Specific Plan, submitted by Bay Meadows Land Company (the land owner) and Wilson Meany (the master developer). Opponents of the proposed Bay Meadows II worked to prevent it (see Controversy below) while the city and master developer worked through the CEQA process for the first site plan (called SPAR 1).

Development Milestones
Date	Event
2005-11-07	Bay Meadows II Specific Plan approved
2008-04-21	SPAR 1 approved. 392 residential units. Office, retail, restaurant, active use
2008-10-14	SPAR 3 approved. 344 residential units.
2012-10	Broke ground on the first residential communities (Landsdowne and Amelia).
2012-12-11	SPAR 4 approved. Nueva School.
2015-08	SurveyMonkey signs lease. First commercial tenant.
2016-10-14	SPAR 2 approved. 341 residential units.
2017-05	Broke ground for Station 2 office building.
2017-09	Broke ground on the 25th Avenue Grade Separation project.

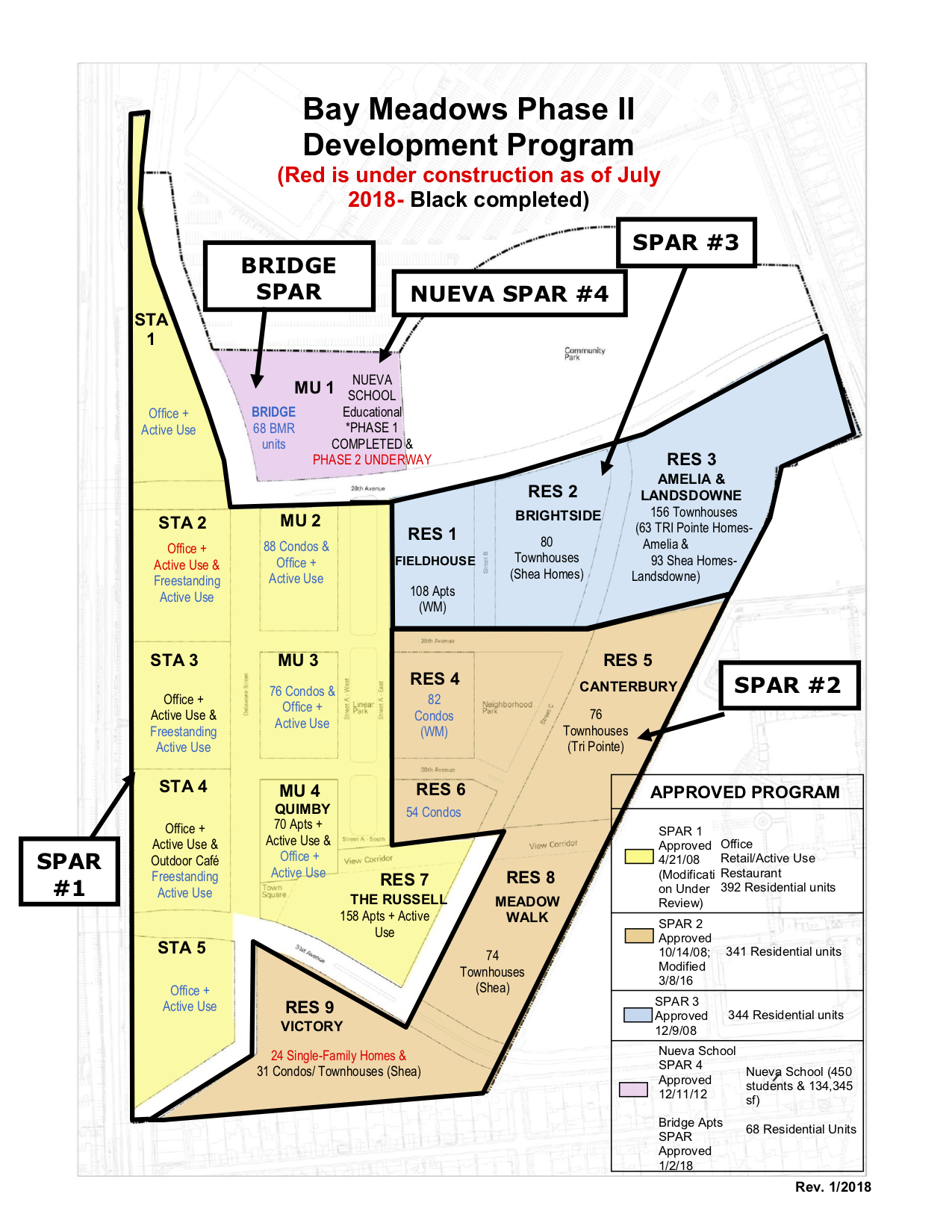
Bay Meadows II Development Program

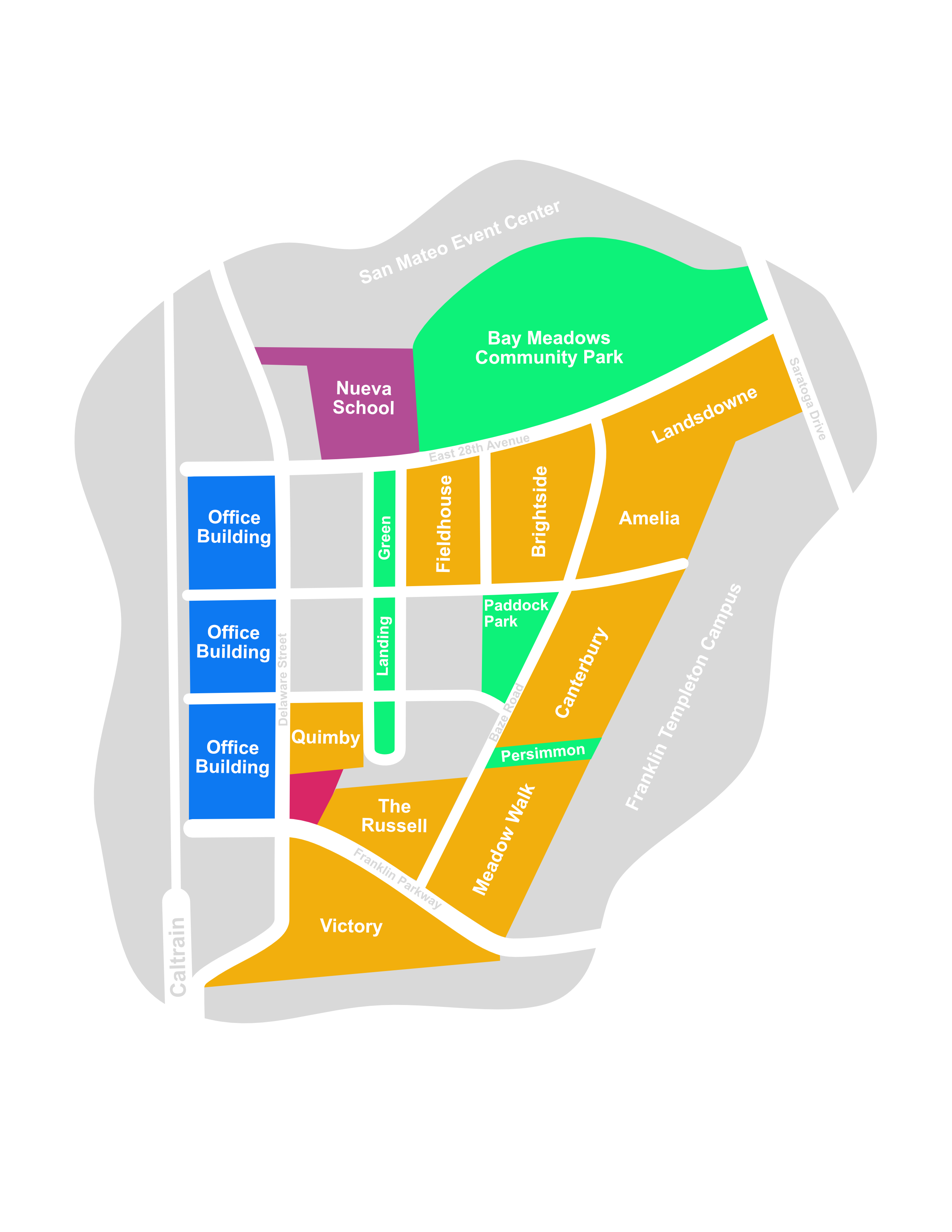
Bay Meadows Areas of Interest

== Controversy ==
Opposition to the demolition of the racetrack and construction of Bay Meadows II was led by a group called Friends of Bay Meadows. Among its objections, the group believed that the racetrack was still a valuable source of tax revenue to the city and was worth saving for historical significance. The group was also concerned about potential traffic issues surrounding the new development.

In 2005, shortly after the City Council approved the Environmental Impact Report for the first section of the development, the group collected signatures for a referendum on the city's decision to proceed with the development. In January 2006, the City Clerk and County Elections Officer refused to certify the referendum for the ballot on the ground that it had insufficient qualified signatures. Friends of Bay Meadows appealed the decision. On December 12, 2007, the Court of Appeal, First District, Division 2 denied the appeal.

Bay Meadows Land Company announced an auction of memorabilia from the racetrack in August 2008. Friends of Bay Meadows asked for a San Mateo Superior Court Judge to issue a temporary restraining order to prevent the auction. However, the auction proceeded.

Also in 2008, Friends of Bay Meadows filed a lawsuit against the City and Bay Meadows Land Company seeking additional environmental and historical review of the project's first section. The group agreed to settle the lawsuit in exchange for $50,000 to cover its legal expenses.

The city proposed building a 5 million gallon overflow sewage storage tank under Bay Meadows Park in 2016. Residents of Bay Meadows II objected to this location for the project.

== Residential communities ==
Bay Meadows II has nine residential communities of townhouses, apartments, and single-family homes. As of 2019, two residential blocks remain undeveloped.

Residential communities
Name	Type	Units	Blocks	Developer
Landsdowne	Townhouses	93	RES 3	Shea Homes
Canterbury	Townhouses	76	RES 5	TRI Pointe Homes
Amelia	Townhouses	63	RES 3	TRI Pointe Homes
Brightside	Townhouses	80	RES 2	Shea Homes
Fieldhouse	Apartments	108	RES 1	
Meadow Walk	Townhouses	105	RES 8	Shea Homes
The Russell	Apartments	158	RES 8	
Quimby	Apartments	70	MU 4	
Victory	Single Family Homes & Townhouses	55	RES 9	Shea Homes

== School ==
The private Nueva School opened its Bay Meadows campus (grades 9–12) in August, 2014.

== Town Square ==
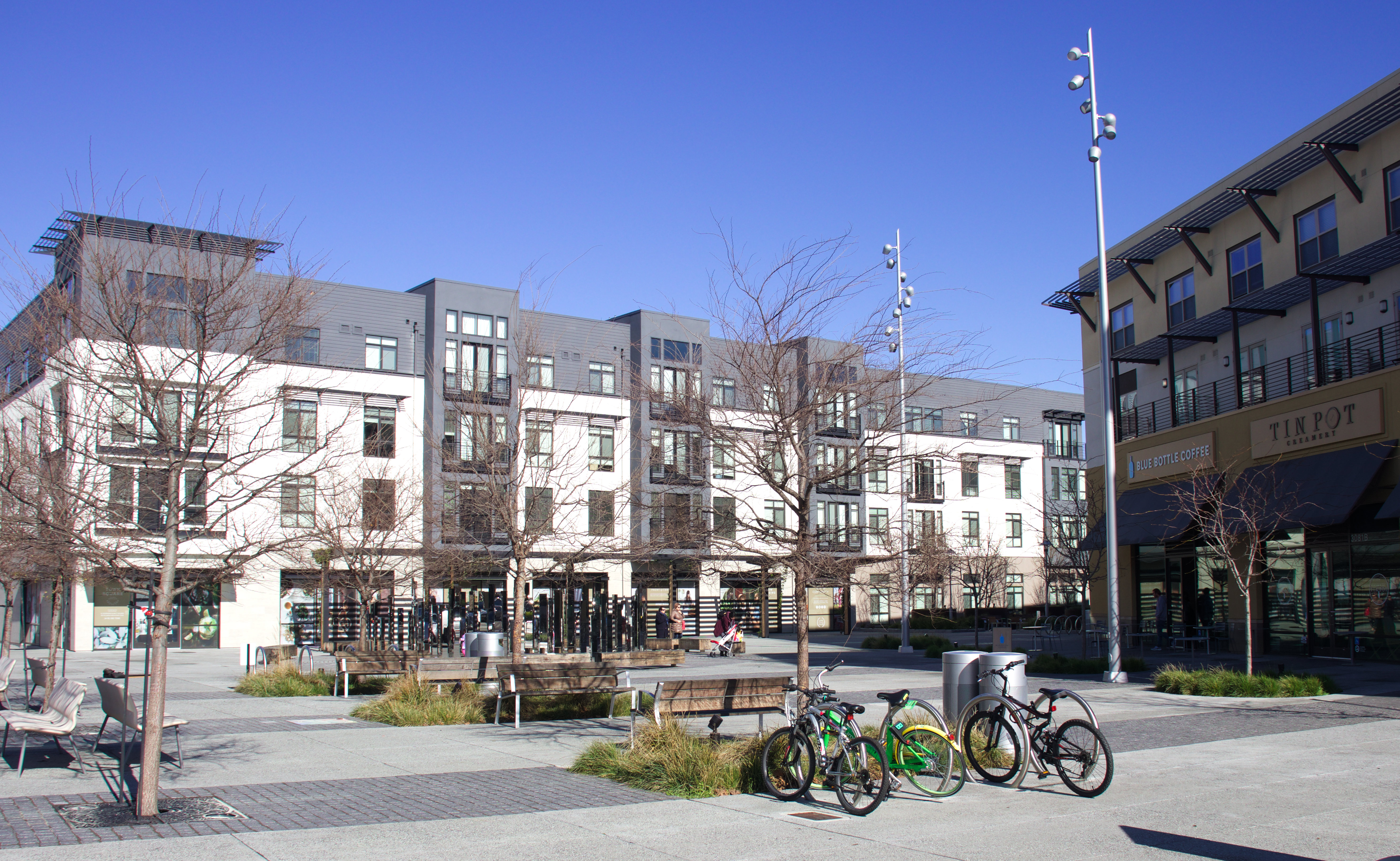
Town Square

Town Square is a multipurpose public plaza and gathering place at the corner of Delaware Street and 31st Avenue. Retail businesses face the square from the first floors of adjacent Quimby and Russell apartment buildings.

== Parks ==
The City of San Mateo owns and maintains three parks in Bay Meadows II.

- Bay Meadows Community Park, located at the very north of the neighborhood, is the largest of the three. It is 13-acre open space, with a pedestrian trail that rings the park's grass fields in the center. The park has grills and picnic tables in two locations. Local youth soccer leagues use the park because of its large grass field.
- Paddock Park, located on Baze Road in approximately the center of the neighborhood, has a mixture of active recreation facilities (basketball half court and children's gym) and picnic and lawn areas.
- Landing Green is a linear park located between the one-way East and West Kyne Streets from 28th Avenue down to The Russell apartments. It has several small lawns, a bocce ball court, fixed chairs, tables and benches, and public artworks.

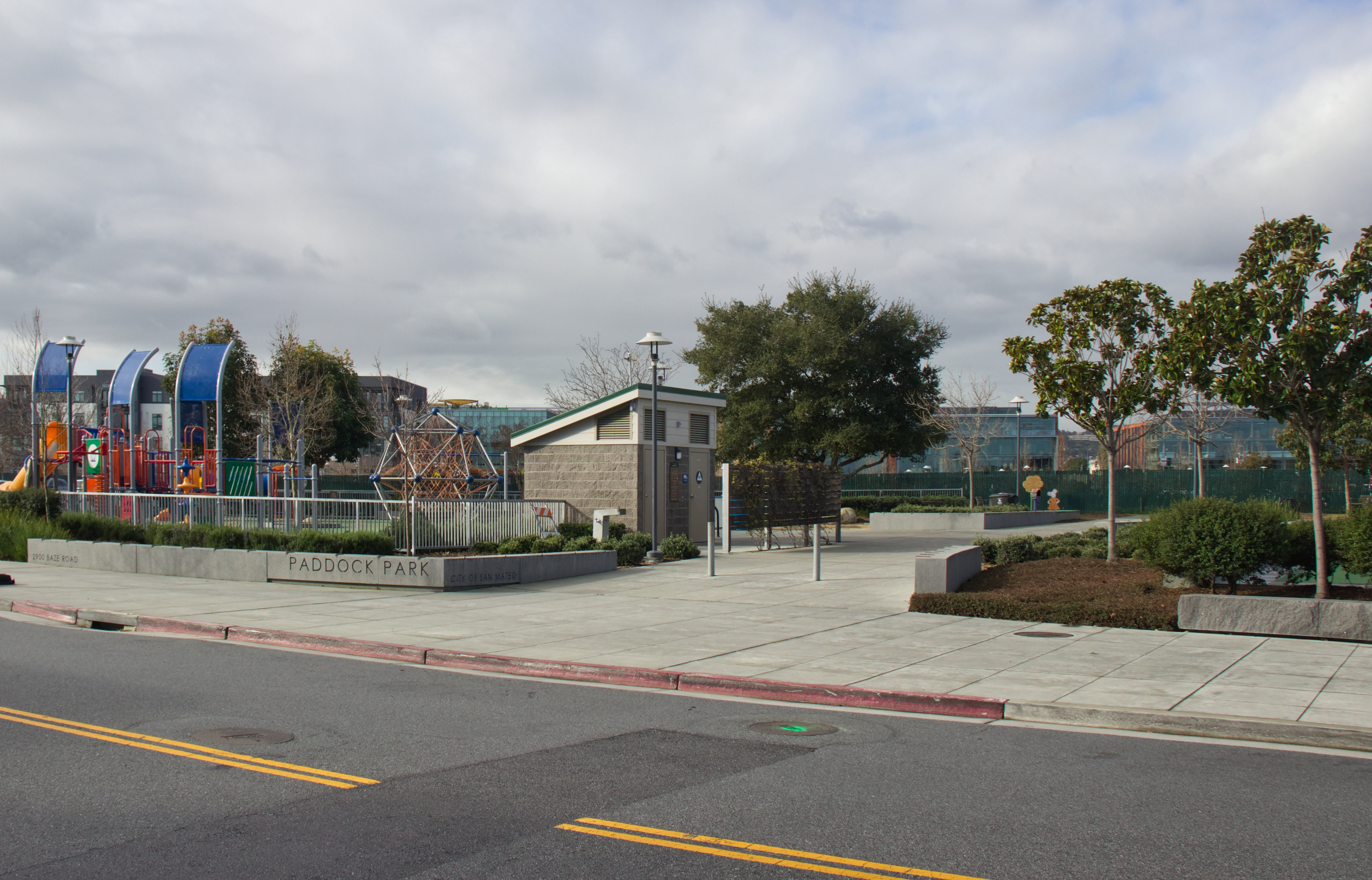
Paddock Park, Bay Meadows

A fourth park, Persimmon Park Community Garden, is privately owned and maintained by the Bay Meadows Community Association. Persimmon Park is located along the view corridor between the Amelia and Meadow Walk communities. It contains 99 raised bed, gardening plots that may be rented yearly to residents of Bay Meadows II.

== Transportation ==
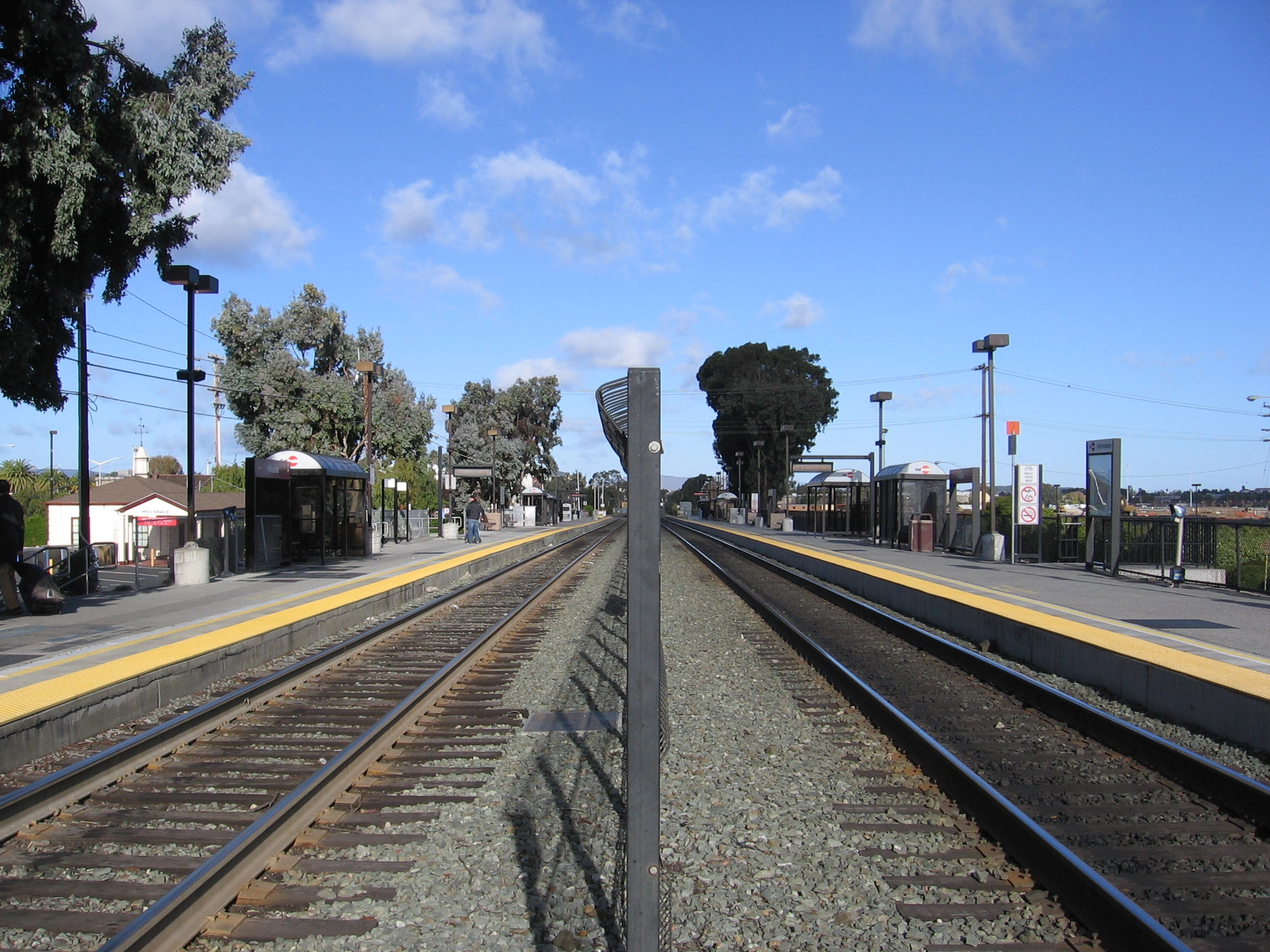
Hillsdale Station before grade separation project

The Hillsdale Caltrain station, just south of 31st Avenue, is integral to the transit-oriented nature of Bay Meadows. Many residents and employees of local businesses use Caltrain to commute to and from the community. When complete, Caltrain's grade separation project will move the Hillsdale station from approximately 31st Avenue to approximately 28th Avenue.

Large employers such as Google, Salesforce, and Facebook provide shuttle bus service from the San Mateo Event Center parking lot, adjacent to Bay Meadows Park, to their Bay Area campuses.

The conditions of approval for Bay Meadows II require developing a transportation demand management plan for motor vehicle traffic. The Bay Meadows II plan establishes a trip budget for each development block and describes a monitoring plan.

== Public art ==
San Mateo's Art in Public Places ordinance requires developers of projects greater than $3 million to the public art fund. There are five works of art in Bay Meadows II.

- Guiding Stars by Christine Wong Yap in Town Square
- Mirrored Labyrinth NY - for California by Jeppe Hein in Town Square
- San Mateo Bridge by Chuck Ginnever in Landing Green Park
- Two and a Half by Evan Shively in Persimmon Park
- Castelo & Limbs by Evan Shively in Persimmon Park

== Community facilities district ==
Bay Meadows II is a Community Facilities District as defined by city resolution 28 (2008) adopted on August 11, 2008. Property owners in Bay Meadows pay a special tax that services bonds issued by the city to finance the construction of infrastructure (gas, electric, water, sewer, etc.).
