= Lost in the Fog Stakes =

- Class: Defunct stakes
- Location: Golden Gate Fields; Albany, California, United States
- Inaugurated: 2007-2023
- Race type: Thoroughbred - Flat racing
- Website: www.goldengatefields.com

Race information
- Distance: 5 & 6 furlong sprint
- Surface: Dirt
- Track: Left-handed
- Qualification: Two-year-old Cal-breds & Four-year-olds & up
- Purse: $75,000

The Lost in the Fog Stakes was an American ungraded Thoroughbred horse race held at Golden Gate Fields in Albany, California. It was named in honor of Lost in the Fog, the brilliant sprinter who made his reputation between 2004 and 2006 before dying of lymphoma at age four.

First run in 2007, the race was a five-furlong sprint for two-year-old horses until 2014 when it was opened to older horses, aged four and up, and run at a distance of six furlongs. During the summer of 2007, the racetrack installed a polymer synthetic type racing surface as mandated by the California Horse Racing Board. The Tapeta Footings synthetic all-weather racing surface is designed to make racing safer for both horses and riders.

With the closure of the racetrack, the 2023 race would be its final edition.

== Records ==
Speed record:

- 1:08.40 - Outside Nashville (2016) @ 6 furlongs
- 0:57.70 - Imaginary Sailor (2007 ) @ 5 furlongs

Most wins:

- Anyportinastorm (2019, 2021)

Most wins by a jockey:

- 4 - Russell Baze (2009, 2010, 2013, 2014)

Most wins by a trainer:

- 4 - Jerry Hollendorfer (2007, 2011, 2014, 2016)

Most wins by an owner:

- 2 - Peter Redekop B.C. Ltd. (2019, 2021)

== Winners ==
Year	Winner	Age	Jockey	Trainer	Owner	Dist. (F)	Time	Win$
2023	Top Harbor	5	Frank Alvarado	Tim McCanna	Gordon Jarnig, Kenny Marshall, Eric Schweiger	6 F	1:09.87	$45,000
2022	Ultimate Bango	7	Catalino Martinez	Samuel Calvario	Mary Tucker	6 F	1:09.70	$45,000
2021	Anyportinastorm	7	Evin Roman	Peter L. Miller	Peter Redekop B.C. Ltd.	6 F	1:09.62	$45,000
2020	Race not held							
2019	Anyportinastorm	5	Juan J. Hernandez	Blaine D. Wright	Peter Redekop B.C. Ltd.	6 F	1:08.80	$45,000
2018	Tribal Storm	4	Irving Orozco	Ed J. Moger Jr.	Curtis C. & Lila L. Lanning	6 F	1:08.71	$39,450
2017	Quick and Silver	6	William Antongeorgi III	William Delia	Ellen & Peter O. Johnson	6 F	1:09.18	$30,350
2016	Outside Nashville	6	Ricardo Gonzalez	Jerry Hollendorfer	Hollendorfer LLC & John Carver	6 F	1:08.40	$30,400
2015	Marino's Wild Cat	6	Silvio Ruiz Amador	Clifford DeLima	GCCI (Roy Guinnane)	6 F	1:08.92	$39,350
2014	Zeewat	4	Russell Baze	Jerry Hollendorfer	Jerry Hollendorfer & George Todaro	6 F	1:09.45	$30,300
2013	Skydreamin	2	Russell Baze	Jeffrey L. Bonde	Lorill Harlingten, Alan P. Klein & Philip Lebherz	5 F	1:00.64	$30,300
2012	Anytime Magic	2	David Lopez	Robert B. Hess Jr.	Natalie Pettis & Carol Stubbs	5 F	0:59.59	$30,450
2011	City Route	2	Kevin Krigger	Jerry Hollendorfer	Jerry Hollendorfer, Mary Jo Amlie, George Todaro	5 F	0:57.75	$30,000
2010	Road Ready	2	Russell Baze	Jeffrey L. Bonde	Jeffrey L. Bonde, Murray Smith, Jim Vreeland	5 F	0:59.48	$30,000
2009	Smiling Tiger	2	Russell Baze	Jeffrey L. Bonde	Alan P. Klein & Philip Lebherz	5 F	0:57.78	$45,000
2008	Maidens Justice	2	Juan Ochoa	Gil Matos	Milton A. Douzos, Sandra Matos	5 F	0:58.71	$45,000
2007	Imaginary Sailor	2	Chad Schvaneveldt	Jerry Hollendorfer	Jerry Hollendorfer, Peter Abruzzo	5 F	0:57.70	$27,800
