= Lost in the Fog =

American-bred Thoroughbred racehorse

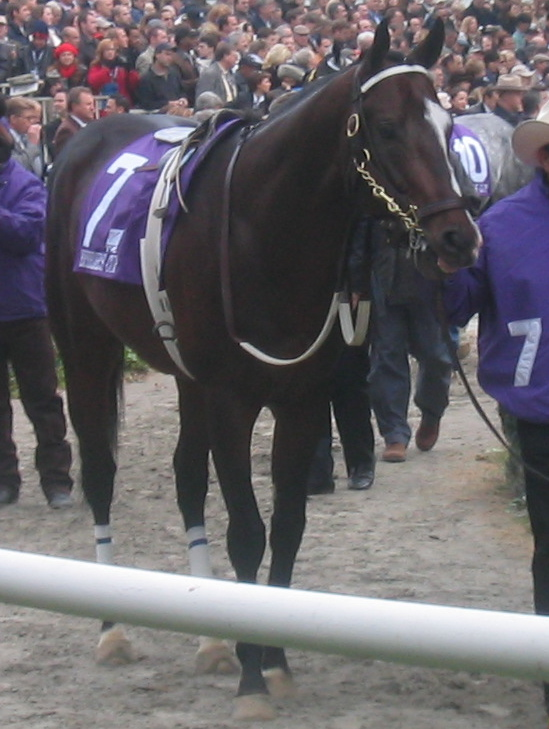
- Lost in the Fog in the paddock before the Breeders' Cup Sprint October 29, 2005
- Sire: Lost Soldier
- Dam: Cloud Break
- Damsire: Dr. Carter
- Sex: Colt
- Foaled: 2002
- Country: United States (Florida)
- Colour: Dark Brown
- Breeder: Susan Seper
- Owner: Harry J. Aleo
- Trainer: Greg Gilchrist
- Record: 14:11-1-0
- Earnings: $978,099

Major wins
- Arizona Juvenile Stakes (2004); King's Bishop Stakes (2005); Carry Back Stakes (2005); Swale Stakes (2005); Riva Ridge Breeders' Cup Stakes (2005); Bay Shore Stakes (2005); Ocala Stud Dash (2005); Golden Gate Breeders' Cup Stakes (2005); Bay Meadows Speed Handicap (2005); Aristides Breeders' Cup Stakes (2006)

Awards
- U.S. Champion Sprint Horse (2005)

Honours
- Lost in the Fog (Sprint) at Golden Gate Fields; He is buried next to Silky Sullivan in the infield at Golden Gate Fields, the only two horses to be so honored.
- Last updated on August 23, 2011

Lost in the Fog (February 4, 2002 – September 17, 2006) was an American thoroughbred race horse. He won his first 10 starts (including two Breeders' Cup stakes), 11 of his 14 lifetime starts across the country, and career earnings of $978,099. He died of lymphoma during his four-year-old season, and his remains were buried at Golden Gate Fields next to Silky Sullivan.

== Bloodlines ==
Bred by Susan Seper and foaled in Florida, his sire was Lost Soldier, (sire of 10 stakes winners and son of Danzig, who was the son of Northern Dancer—ranked #43 by The Blood-Horse in their top 100 U.S. thoroughbred champions of the 20th Century). His dam was Cloud Break, a Dr. Carter mare. Unraced, Cloud Break is proving a successful broodmare; she also produced the stakes-placed How About My Place, by Out of Place. In foal to Speightstown, Cloud Break was acquired by WinStar Farm in 2005's Fasig-Tipton Kentucky November mixed sale for $600,000. In 2006, she was sold to Charles Deter. He was a descendant of War Admiral and Secretariat.

Lost in the Fog was a $13,000 weanling and a $48,000 yearling. Not reaching his reserve in the 2004 two-year-old Ocala, Florida, Breeders' Sale in March (the stopping price was $195,000), he was sold privately for $140,000 to Harry Aleo, and throughout his short career was trained by Greg Gilchrist. Susan Seper said he was named because of a quizzical look caused by his offset/crooked blaze. He received his name just a few days after foaling.

== Career ==
=== Winning streak ===
Lost in the Fog's home track was the San Francisco Bay Area's Golden Gate Fields. In 2005, competing solely in stakes company (with the exception of his maiden), he won the Eclipse Award for Outstanding Sprint Horse. He won 10 straight races, although his hopes of becoming the 2005 Eclipse Award for Horse of the Year winner were dashed on October 29, 2005, when he finished seventh in the Breeders' Cup Sprint. After the Breeders' Cup, Lost in the Fog took six months off. Prior to that he was unbeaten, with a string of 10 sprint victories (short races—six or seven furlongs on the dirt). Because of his success, he never went off at long odds; indeed, he was favored in every lifetime start.

=== Comeback ===
The colt lost his first 2006 start, finishing second behind Carthage in the April 22 Oakland Tribune Golden Gate Fields Sprint. On June 3, 2006, Lost in the Fog returned to his winning ways for a final time with a victory in the six-furlong Grade 3 Aristides Breeders' Cup Handicap at Churchill Downs (named for Aristides, the little horse who won the first Kentucky Derby). Carrying high weight of 124 pounds and ridden by Russell Baze, Lost in the Fog won the $69,024 winner's share of the purse and set a new stakes record. The Aristides was his tenth stakes victory. His final start was the Smile Sprint Handicap at Calder on July 15, 2006, in which the colt finished ninth. This puzzling result suggested to observers that something was wrong with the horse.

== Races ==
Date	Track	Race	Distance	Finish	Margin
July 15, 2006	Calder Race Course	Smile Sprint Handicap	6 Furlongs	9th	8 lengths
June 3, 2006	Churchill Downs	Aristides Breeders' Cup Stakes	6 Furlongs	1st	1 1/4
April 22, 2006	Golden Gate Fields	Oakland Tribune	6 Furlongs	2nd	3
October 29, 2005	Belmont Park	Breeders' Cup Sprint	6 Furlongs	7th	6
October 1, 2005	Bay Meadows	Bay Meadows Speed Handicap	6 Furlongs	1st	7 3/4
August 27, 2005	Saratoga Race Course	King's Bishop Stakes	7 Furlongs	1st	4 3/4
July 10, 2005	Calder Race Course	Carry Back Stakes	6 Furlongs	1st	7 1/4
June 11, 2005	Belmont Park	Riva Ridge Breeders' Cup Stakes	7 Furlongs	1st	1 1/4
May 14, 2005	Golden Gate Fields	Golden Bear Breeders' Cup Stakes	6 Furlongs	1st	10
April 9, 2005	Aqueduct Racetrack	Bay Shore Stakes	7 Furlongs	1st	4 1/4
March 5, 2005	Gulfstream Park	Swale Stakes	6 Furlongs	1st	4 3/4
January 29, 2005	Gulfstream Park	Ocala Stud Dash Stakes*	6 Furlongs	1st	4 1/2
December 26, 2004	Turf Paradise	Arizona Juvenile Stakes	6 Furlongs	1st	14 3/4
November 14, 2004	Golden Gate Fields	Maiden Special Weight	5 Furlongs	1st	7 1/2

Average win margin when undefeated: 6 3/4 lengths

Note: The Ocala Stud Dash Stakes is also known as the Sunshine Millions Dash as part of the Sunshine Millions series for Florida-bred and California-bred horses.

== Cancer ==
In August 2006, believing Lost in the Fog to be suffering from a mild bout of colic, his handlers took him to the California-Davis veterinary school. Performing a biopsy on the horse, the doctors discovered what they believed to be a cancerous mass on his spleen—a lymphoma "about the size of a cantaloupe." The doctors thought that surgery was likely, a rare operation but possibly one that could give Lost in the Fog a full life.

Gilchrist, his trainer, had thought that his horse's recent poor performances—winning only one of three starts this year—might have been due to quarter cracks. "It turns out he's been running with this thing inside him this year," he said. "It shows you what kind of warrior this horse is." Lost in the Fog's owner, Harry Aleo, was extremely concerned about his star horse: "We will do anything we can for the horse. It's almost a Barbaro-type situation."

On August 18, the situation worsened. According to a report in The Blood-Horse, "Two additional tumors were discovered. The first, the size of an egg, was located in the membrane that suspends the spleen. The second, ... as large as the growth found originally on the spleen, is beneath [the horse's] spine along his back," which could not be surgically removed. Gilchrist didn't think it would appropriate to extend Lost in the Fog's life unnecessarily or subject the horse to surgery or chemotherapy.

"We'll keep him in the stall for a week or 10 days," Gilchrist said. "This would be the best thing to do, get him back with his groom. I just couldn't leave him up there (at Davis) to be euthanized and thrown in the bone yard. We're fine with a week, 10 days, maybe two weeks," he said. "But you get beyond that, his quality of life wouldn't be good. This way we'll let the people who have always been around him take care of him. We'll bring him home and make him as happy as we can for awhile."

== Death ==
Lost in the Fog was vanned back to his stall at Golden Gate Fields, where he was pampered for his remaining days. On September 17, 2006, he was quietly euthanized. The colt had been grazing, as he had done twice each day since the discovery of his cancer, when Gilcrist saw he was in obvious distress and ordered him to be euthanized. He said that Lost in the Fog was happy and peaceful until the end.

An autopsy on Lost in the Fog revealed that the cancer was much more widespread than previously thought. The necropsy was performed at University of California at Davis. The doctors originally thought that the tumor, located directly beneath the spine, was about a foot in length, but it ran nearly the entire length of the horse's back.

Dr. David Wilson, director of the university's large-animal clinic and a member of the team who worked on the horse, said that the tumor "went all the way from his pelvis to invade and erode his diaphragm and chest cavity." The tumor also affected the horse's intestinal organs as well as his arteries and kidneys, encroaching on one kidney and compressing both. Coming up alongside Lost in the Fog's aorta and pressing against his blood vessels, the tumor caused swelling in his hind legs. In previous tests, other organs had partly hidden the tumor from view. Additionally, Lost in the Fog bore a football-sized tumor in his spleen.

Harry Aleo was astounded that Lost in the Fog could perform at such a high level before his cancer was diagnosed. Doctors told the owner that the tumors could have been growing for up to a year. Only weeks before his death, however, the horse continued to record bullet workouts at Golden Gate. Lost in the Fog's remains were cremated. There had been discussion of their going to Greg and Karen Dodd's Southern Chase Farm in Williston, Florida, where the horse was raised. However, arrangements were made for the colt's ashes to be buried at Golden Gate Fields, where he was stabled. He is buried next to Silky Sullivan.

== Legacy ==
=== Lost in the Fog Stakes ===
On September 30, 2006, Golden Gate Fields celebrated Lost in the Fog's life. In 2007, the track hosted the inaugural Lost in the Fog Stakes, a five-furlong sprint for two-year-olds:

Date	Purse	Distance	Track	Winner	Jockey	Trainer	Time	Odds
June 10	$50,000	5f	Golden Gate Fields	Imaginary Sailor	Chad Schvaneveldt	Jerry Hollendorfer	:57.70	0.50

=== Documentary ===
A documentary, Lost in the Fog, was produced by John Corey for release in 2008. The film made its world premiere at the CineVegas Film Festival in June 2008, where it won the Audience Award for Best Documentary. The Film was also nominated as Best First Feature at IDFA, the International Documentary Festival of Amsterdam.
