= Golden Gate Handicap (Dirt) =

- Class: Grade III
- Location: Golden Gate Fields; Berkeley, California, United States
- Inaugurated: 1948 (as Berkeley Stakes)
- Race type: Thoroughbred – Flat racing

Race information
- Distance: 1 1/16 miles
- Surface: Synthetic
- Track: Left-handed
- Qualification: Three-year-olds and older
- Weight: Assigned
- Purse: US$100,000

The Golden Gate Handicap is a Grade III American Thoroughbred horse race for horses age three and older over a distance of one and one sixteenth miles with handicap conditions on the Tapeta, a synthetic racing surface held annually in November at Golden Gate Fields in Berkeley, California. The event offers a purse of US$100,000.

== History ==
The race was inaugurated on 13 October 1948 as the Berkeley Stakes for two-year-olds that were bred in California over the dirt track. The event was won by Moonrush who was ridden by American Hall of Fame jockey Ralph Neves. Moonrush would win the event again the following year when ii was held in March for three-year-olds as the Berkeley Handicap. Moonrush would later in his career capture the Santa Anita Handicap, one of the most prestigious events in California.

The event in its early days would did not have set scheduled date but would regularly rotate March, May and November with a distance of either 6 furlongs or one mile. The event was for three year olds except in 1957 when the event was run for two-year-olds in split divisions and in 1961 when the event was held as an Invitational race which included older horses. In 1958 and 1964 when the race was restricted to three-year-old-fillies. In 1962 the event was not held.

In 1965 the event was scheduled as an open event for three-year-olds and older over a distance 1 1/16 miles. From 1966 to 1970 the event was held in April and run over a much longer distance of 1 1/4 miles. With the creation of a new turf track at Golden Gate Fields in 1972 the event was scheduled on the grass. The event was held on the turf for 6 years. During this the Argentine-bred import Yvetot won the event twice in 1973 and 1974.

In 1978 the event was moved back to the dirt track and scheduled in February over a mile in distance.

In 1996 the event was held in December as a two-year-old event.

In 2000 the American Graded Stakes Committee classified the event as Grade III. In 2007 the event's conditions were changed to stakes allowance and the this reflected in the name. During the summer of 2007, Golden Gate Fields installed a polymer synthetic type racing surface and since 2008 the event has been run on this surface. In 2012 the event reverted to handicap conditions.

The Brazilian-bred Editore became the third horse to win the event twice in 2018.

In 2020 the event was not held for the fourth time due to an outbreak of COVID-19 pandemic in the United States.

In 2023 the event was renamed as the Golden Gate Handicap.

== Records ==
Speed record:

- 1 1/16 miles (synthetic) - 1:42.40 Mugaritz (2019)
- 1 mile (dirt) - 1:33.80 Snorter (2004)
- 1 1/16 miles (dirt) - 1:40.94 Desert Boom (2005)

Margin:

- 7 lengths - Sun Master (1986)
- 7 lengths - Wild Wonder (1998)

Most wins:

- 2 - Moonrush (1948, 1949)
- 2 - Yvetot (ARG) (1973, 1974)
- 2 - Editore (BRZ) (2017, 2018)

Most wins by a jockey:

- 6 – Russell Baze (1987, 1995, 1998, 2004, 2013, 2015)

Most wins by a trainer:

- 4 – Jerry Hollendorfer (1995, 1996, 2000, 2013)

Most wins by an owner :

- 2 – Anita King & Gus Luellwitz (1948, 1949)
- 2 – W. K. Gumpert & Edwin Selesnick (1973, 1974)
- 2 – Halo Farms (1995, 2000)
- 2 – Jerry Hollendorfer (1996, 2013)
- 2 – Bonne Chance Farm & Stud R D I (2017, 2018)

== Winners ==
Year	Winner	Age	Jockey	Trainer	Owner	Distance	Time	Purse	Grade	Ref
Golden Gate Handicap
2023	War At Sea	4	Frank Alvarado	Ronald Ellis	Doubledown Stables	1 1/16 miles	1:44.48	$100,900	III	
Berkeley Handicap
2022	Lammas (GB)	5	Kevin Radke	Manuel Badilla	Ronald L. Charles & Samuel Gordon	1 1/16 miles	1:42.42	$100,000	III	
2021	Freeport Joe	4	Assael Espinoza	Gloria Haley	Larry Odbert	1 1/16 miles	1:43.70	$100,900	III	
2020	Race not held									
2019	Mugaritz	4	Ricardo Gonzalez	Jonathan Wong	Alejandro Mercardo	1 1/16 miles	1:42.40	$101,500	III	
2018	Editore (BRZ)	6	Brice Blanc	Paulo H. Lobo	Bonne Chance Farm & Stud R D I	1 1/16 miles	1:42.94	$101,125	III	
2017	Editore (BRZ)	5	Brice Blanc	Paulo H. Lobo	Bonne Chance Farm & Stud R D I	1 1/16 miles	1:43.37	$102,025	III	
2016	Stryker Phd	7	Leslie Mawing	Larry D. Ross	Jim & Mona Hour	1 1/16 miles	1:43.67	$100,000	III	
2015	Poshsky	5	Russell Baze	Peter L. Miller	Silver Ranch Stable & Wachtel Stable	1 1/16 miles	1:42.70	$100,210	III	
2014	Pepper Crown	4	Juan J. Hernandez	Alex Paszkeicz	Alexander A. Paszkeicz Living Trust	1 1/16 miles	1:44.74	$100,315	III	
2013	Summer Hit	4	Russell Baze	Jerry Hollendorfer	John Carver & Jerry Hollendorfer	1 1/16 miles	1:42.65	$100,000	III	
2012	† Awesome Gem	9	Aaron Gryder	Craig Dollase	West Point Thoroughbreds	1 1/16 miles	1:45.82	$100,000	III	
Berkeley Stakes
2011	Uh Oh Bango	4	Aaron Gryder	R. Kory Owens	Triple AAA Ranch	1 1/16 miles	1:45.61	$100,000	III	
2010	Run It	4	Chad Phillip Schvaneveldt	Dennis M. Patterson	Mercedes Stable	1 1/16 miles	1:44.50	$100,000	III	
2009	Autism Awareness	4	David G. Lopez	Genaro Vallejo	Johnny Taboada	1 1/16 miles	1:43.12	$150,000	III	
2008	McCann's Mojave	8	Frank T. Alvarado	Steven Specht	Mike Willman	1 1/16 miles	1:43.06	$150,000	III	
2007	My Creed	6	Modesto Linares	Robert B. Hess Sr.	Seven Star Racing Stable & Robert B. Hess Sr.	1 1/16 miles	1:43.46	$100,000	III	
Berkeley Handicap
2006	Spellbinder	5	Roberto M. Gonzalez	Richard E. Mandella	Jerry & Ann Moss	1 1/16 miles	1:43.07	$150,000	III	
2005	Desert Boom	5	Roberto M. Gonzalez	Art Sherman	Robert D. Bone	1 1/16 miles	1:40.94	$100,000	III	
2004	Snorter	4	Russell Baze	Robert J. Frankel	Gary & Mary West Stables	1 mile	1:33.80	$94,375	III	
2003	I'madrifter	5	Roberto M. Gonzalez	Steven Specht	Daniel O'Neill	1 mile	1:35.13	$100,000	III	
2002	Irisheyesareflying	6	Jose Valdivia Jr.	John K. Dolan	Dolan Racing Stable, Lloyd Graham & Alice Taylor	1 mile	1:35.41	$100,000	III	
2001	Blade Prospector (BRZ)	6	Omar A. Berrio	Antonio C. Avila	Raza Stable	1 mile	1:34.00	$100,000	III	
2000	§ Voice of Destiny	4	Rafael Q. Meza	Jerry Hollendorfer	Halo Farms	1 mile	1:35.67	$125,000	III	
1999	Hal's Pal (GB)	6	Brice Blanc	Ben D. A. Cecil	Addison Racing	1 mile	1:34.96	$125,000	Listed	
1998	Wild Wonder	4	Russell Baze	Greg Gilchrist	VHW Stables	1 mile	1:35.19	$81,450	Listed	
1997	Race not held									
1996	Houston Fleet M D	2	Dennis Carr	Jerry Hollendorfer	Mark DeDomenico & Jerry Hollendorfer	1 mile	1:36.67	$42,600		2YO
1995	Double Jab	4	Russell Baze	Jerry Hollendorfer	Halo Farms	1 mile	1:35.18	$83,475	Listed	
1994	§ River Special	4	Thomas M. Chapman	Charles J. Jenda	Golden Eagle Farm	1 mile	1:34.33	$55,100	Listed	
1993	Infamous Deed	5	Ronald J. Warren Jr.	Fordell Fierce	Ron Crockett	1 mile	1:35.67	$43,960		
1992	Music Prospector	5	Ron D. Hansen	Steven Miyadi	Silky Green	1 mile	1:35.29	$53,950		
1991	High Energy	4	Ronald J. Warren Jr.	Jerry M. Fanning	Dennis Beyreuther	1 mile	1:35.70	$55,300		
1990	On the Menu	4	Christine Lynn Davenport	William F. Davis	Brent & Terri Carruth	1 mile	1:34.80	$54,100		
1989	Ongoing Mister	4	Timothy T. Doocy	James R. Kiesner	Robert Hagopian	1 mile	1:34.20	$56,100		
1988	Sanger Chief	5	Timothy T. Doocy	Lloyd C. Mason	Lloyd C. Mason, Paul Cane & Robert H. Klinger	1 mile	1:35.60	$54,000		
1987	Rocky Marriage	7	Russell Baze	Robert J. Frankel	Sidney L. Port	1 mile	1:36.80	$54,750		
1986	Sun Master	5	Marco Castaneda	Gary F. Jones	Elmendorf Farm	1 mile	1:34.60	$43,400		
1985	Nak Ack	4	Joseph C. Judice	Charles C. Foster	Robert C. Brinker	1 mile	1:36.20	$44,800		
1984	Songhay	5	Joseph C. Judice	Leon LaGrone	Leon LaGrone	1 mile	1:35.40	$45,300		
1983	Pleasant Power	5	Jeff R. Anderson	Jack Arterburn	Joseph E. Awender	1 mile	1:40.60	$45,800		
1982	Foyt's Ack	7	Roberto M. Gonzalez	Paul O. Wayt	Red Baron's Barn	1 mile	1:38.00	$40,000+		
1981	Head Hawk	5	Danny Sorenson	William A. Findlay	Louis Peretti & Joack Polack	1 1/16 miles	1:45.60	$43,750		
1980	Race not held									
1979	Gustoso	4	Rudy Campas	Henry M. Moreno	Louis Lee Brooks Sr.	1 mile	1:34.40	$34,000		
1978	Boy Tike	5	Antonio L. Diaz	Eric J. Longden	Harry Gelpar & Eric J. Longden	1 mile	1:36.20	$32,750		
1977	Lino	5	Raul Caballero	Ike Orr	Melvin D. Stark	1 mile	1:37.40	$27,300		
1976	Branford Court	6	Antonio L. Diaz	Gene Cleveland	Cardiff Stock Farm	1 mile	1:35.00	$26,950		
1975	Star Of Kuwait	7	William Mahorney	Robert L. Martin	Jawl Brothers	1 1/16 miles	1:44.80	$27,700		
1974	Yvetot (ARG)	6	Frank Olivares	William A. Peterson	W. K. Gumpert & Edwin Selesnick	1 1/16 miles	1:43.80	$33,400		
1973	Yvetot (ARG)	5	Victor Tejeda	William A. Peterson	W. K. Gumpert & Edwin Selesnick	1 1/16 miles	1:44.20	$32,150		
1972	On The Track	5	Roy Yaka	Farrell W. Jones	Peter Valenti	1 1/16 miles	1:44.40	$32,100		
1971	Most Host	5	Roy Yaka	Gene Cleveland	Laguna Seca Ranch & Dr. Jack Robbins	1 1/8 miles	1:50.20	$26,450		
1970	Try Sheep	4	Merlin Volzke	Noble Threewitt	Middle Ranch & Elizabeth La Tourrette	1 1/4 miles	2:01.60	$26,650		
1969	Royal Comedian	5	Angel Valenzuela	MacKenzie Miller	Cragwood Stables	1 1/4 miles	2:01.00	$27,500		
1968	Mainsheet	7	Jack Robinson	John S. McCaslin	Irene Flinn	1 1/4 miles	2:01.60	$26,850		
1967	Carang	6	Merlin Volzke	Carl A. Roles	Mr. & Mrs J. T. Forno	1 1/4 miles	2:01.00	$16,050		
1966	High Perch	5	Miguel Yanez	John J. Leavitt	Cline Hoggard	1 1/4 miles	2:00.80	$16,375		
1965	Hasty Trip	3	Senen Trevino	Richard Chew	Mr. & Mrs. Robert J. Cooper	1 1/16 miles	1:41.60	$21,650		
1964	§ Sari's Song	3	Clay Brinson	Jess Byrd	J. Kel Houssels	1 mile	1:38.00	$10,725		3YO fillies
1963	More Megaton	3	Raymond York	James Wallace	Mr. & Mrs. Elwood B. Johnston	1 1/16 miles	1:43.40	$10,825		3YOs
1962	Race not held									
1961	Swaps Kin	6	Ralph Neves	Michael E. Millerick	Mr. & Mrs. L. K. Shapiro	6 furlongs	1:09.80	$10,000		
1960	Free Copy	3	Angel Valenzuela	Daniel Parket	Mitzvah Stables & Mr. & Mrs. Charles Turner	1 1/16 miles	1:43.00	$11,075		3YOs
1959	Revel	3	Ismael Valenzuela	C. E. Buck Logan	Helen L. Kenaston	6 furlongs	1:09.60	$10,875		3YOs
1958	§ Nushie	3	Alex Maese	Carl A. Roles	Mrs. Harry Curland	6 furlongs	1:11.00	$19,850		3YO fillies
1957	Fire Alarm	2	Manuel Ycaza	Reginald D. Cornell	Mr. & Mrs. John Robinson	6 furlongs	1:09.60	$10,875	2YOs	Division 1
1957	Strong Bay	2	William Harmatz	Raymond Priddy	W. E. Britt	6 furlongs	1:09.20	$10,800	2YOs	Division 2
1956	Lucky G. L.	3	Ralph Neves	William Molter	Mr. & Mrs. George Lewis	1 mile	1:35.20	$11,150		3YOs
1955	Noir	3	George Taniguchi	T. Hart Nesbit	T. Hart Nesbit	6 furlongs	1:09.40	$11,175		3YOs
1954	Pajone	3	Leroy Nelson	Richard D. Moon	Ted T. Nevin	6 furlongs	1:09.60	$11,400		3YOs
1953	Berseem	3	Bill Shoemaker	Reginald D. Cornell	Abe Hirschberg	6 furlongs	1:08.80	$17,000		3YOs
1952	Big Noise	3	Ralph Neves	Warren R. Stute	Betty Grable & Harry James	6 furlongs	1:11.40	$11,400		3YOs
1951	Palestinian	3	William Shoemaker	Hirsch Jacobs	I. Bieber	9 furlongs	1:48	$8,375		3YOs
1950	ƒ Bullremember	3	Arlin Bassett	Hack Ross	Carlotta D. Jelm	6 furlongs	1:10.40	$11,740		3YOs
1949	Moonrush	3	Ralph Neves	William F. Alvarado	Anita King & Gus Luellwitz	6 furlongs	1:10.40	$11,120		3YOs
Berkeley Stakes
1948	Moonrush	2	Ralph Neves	William F. Alvarado	Anita King & Gus Luellwitz	6 furlongs	1:11.20	$8,675		2YOs‡

Legend:
All Weather Track Dirt Turf
Notes:
§ Ran as an entry
ƒ Filly or Mare
† In the 2012 running of the event Positive Response was first past the post but interfered twice in the last 100 yards with Anthony's Cross who had finished fourth and was disqualified. Positive Response was placed fourth and Awesome Gem was declared the official winner of the event.
‡ In 1948 the event was for two-year-olds that were bred in California

== See also ==
- List of American and Canadian Graded races
