= California Cup Juvenile Stakes =

The California Cup Juvenile Stakes is an American thoroughbred horse race run annually at Santa Anita Park in Arcadia, California during its Oak Tree Racing Association meet in the fall of the year. Raced on dirt over a distance of 1 1/16 miles, it open to two-year-old colts bred in the state of California. The event currently offers a purse of $125,000 and a trophy.

The California Cup Juvenile Stakes is part of the "California Cup Day" series of races intended to call attention to, and to honor, the California Thoroughbred racing and breeding industry.

== Past winners ==
- 2011 - Rousing Sermon (Rafael Bejarano)
- 2010 - Slammer Time
- 2009 - Bench the Judge (Reyes C. Santiago)
- 2008 - Lucky Primo (Joel Rosario)
- 2007 - Sierra Sunset (Russell Baze)
- 2006 - Freesgood
- 2005 - Bright Maneuvers
- 2004 - Texcess
- 2003 - He's the Rage
- 2002 - Crackup
- 2001 - Yougottawanna
- 2000 - Proud Tower
- 1999 - Sparcelink
- 1998 - Sunday Stroll
- 1997 - Ex Marks the Cop
- 1996 - Carmen's Baby
- 1995 - Cavonnier
- 1994 - Fandarel Dancer
- 1993 - Flying Sensation
- 1992 - Boating Pleasure
- 1991 - Ebonair
- 1990 - Crystal's Game
