= Bay Meadows Breeders' Cup Sprint =

The Bay Meadows Breeders' Cup Sprint is a race for Thoroughbred horses held each year at Bay Meadows in San Mateo, California. The race is open to four-year-olds and up willing to make a six furlong dash on the dirt.

A Grade III event, it offers a trophy and a purse of $100,000 (includes $25,000 from the Breeders' Cup Fund).

In 2009, this race was downgraded from a Grade III event to ungraded status.

== Past winners ==
- 2008 - Bonfante (Frank Alvarado)
- 2007 - Smokey Stover (Aaron Gryder)
- 2006 - Carthage (Dennis Carr)
- 2005 -
- 2004 - Court's in Session (Roberto Gonzalez)
- 2003 - El Dorado Shooter (Chad Schvaneveld)
- 2002 - Mellow Fellow (Russell Baze)
- 2001 - Lexicon (Russell Baze)
- 2000 - Lexicon (Russell Baze)
- 1999 - Big Jag (Jose Valdivia, Jr.)
