= California Oaks =

Horse race in Berkeley, California

- Class: Non-graded stakes
- Location: Golden Gate Fields; Berkeley, California, United States
- Race type: Thoroughbred - Flat racing
- Website: www.goldengatefields.com

Race information
- Distance: 1 1/16 miles (8.5 furlongs)
- Surface: Tapeta Footings synthetic dirt
- Track: left-handed
- Qualification: Three-year-old fillies
- Weight: Assigned
- Purse: $75,000 (2020)

The California Oaks is an American Thoroughbred horse race held annually in February at Golden Gate Fields in Berkeley, California. Open to three-year-old fillies, it is contested on Tapeta Footings synthetic dirt over a distance of a mile and a sixteenth (8.5 furlongs).

The event is an ungraded stakes race with a current purse of $75,000 and has been a prep race to the Triple Tiara of Thoroughbred Racing, including the Kentucky Oaks, the Black-Eyed Susan Stakes and Mother Goose Stakes.

== Records ==
Speed record:

- 1 1/16 miles - 1:39.04 - Sky Mystic (2008)

Most wins by a jockey:

- 4 - Russell Baze (2009, 2011, 2012, 2014)

Most wins by a trainer:

- 4 - Doug O'Neill (2013, 2015, 2017, 2019)

== Winners of the California Oaks since 1994 ==
Year	Winner	Age	Jockey	Trainer	Owner	Dist. (Miles)	Time
2022	Anthonys Cleopatra	3	Frank Alvarado	Tim McCanna	Cacchiotti Ranch	1-1/16	1:45.36
2021	Pizazz	3	Kyle Frey	Richard Mandella	Perry R. Bass II & Ramona S. Bass	1-1/16	1:44.94
2020	Dynasty of Her Own	3	Ricardo Gonzalez	Jonathan Wong	Tommy Town Thoroughbreds	1-1/16	1:44.55
2019	Sold It	3	Rafael Bejarano	Doug O'Neill	Ciaran Dunne & Reddam Racing	1-1/16	1:44.78
2018	Consolida	3	Julien Couton	Patrick Gallagher	Eclipse Thoroughbred Partners & Green Lantern Stables	1-1/16	1:45.48
2017	Tap It All	3	Kyle Frey	Doug O'Neill	ERJ Racing & Reddam Racing	1-1/16	1:45.12
2016	Kiss N Scat	3	Ricardo Gonzalez	Jerry Hollendorfer	Hollendorfer/Melen/Taub/George	1-1/16	1:44.14
2015	Sharla Rae	3	Silvio Ruiz Amador	Doug O'Neill	W. C. Racing (Glenn Sorgenstein)	1-1/16	1:44.46
2014	Be Proud	3	Russell Baze	Bob Baffert	Patti Earnhardt & Hal J. Earnhardt III	1-1/16	1:47.62
2013	Redressthebalance	3	Christian S. Reyes	Doug O'Neill	Rutherford Group/Meredith/Pegum	1-1/16	1:45.40
2012	Lady of Fifty	3	Russell Baze	Jerry Hollendorfer	Jerry Hollendorfer & George Todaro	1-1/16	1:46.04
2011	Lilacs and Lace	3	Russell Baze	Duane Offield	Judy Hicks & Kathryn Nikkel	1-1/16	1:46.32
2010	Antares World	3	Frank Alvarado	Steven Specht	M/M Larry D. Williams	1-1/16	1:45.75
2009	Will O Way	3	Russell Baze	Vladimir Cerin	Ronald Waranch et al.	1-1/16	1:45.23
2008	Sky Mystic	3	David G. Lopez	Gregory G. Gilchrist	David & Jill Heerensperger	1-1/16	1:39.04
2007	Eastlake Avenue	3	Chad Schvaneveldt	Jerry Hollendorfer	George Todaro	1-1/16	1:45.90
2006	Sierra Sweetie	3	Martin Garcia	Jeffrey L. Bonde	Peter Branagh, George Schmitt, Mary C. Schmitt, Jeff Shieldas, Larry Varellas	1-1/16	1:43.64
2005	Race not held						
2004	House of Fortune	3	Ronnie Warren Jr.	Ron McAnally	Arnold Zetcher	1-1/16	1:41.60
2003	Amber Hills	3	Gary Baze	Ed Moger Jr.	Curt & Lila Lanning	1-1/16	1:44.25
2002	La Martina	3	Corey Lanerie	Jenine Sahadi	Team Valor	1-1/16	1:47.16
2001	Aswhatilldois	3	Adelberto Lopez	James Hilling	Lindsay D. Myers	1-1/16	1:55.48
1995	2000	Race not held					
1994	Baby Diamonds	3	Gary Boulanger	Joseph A. Devereux	Arthur Benjamin	1-1/16	1:46.20

== See also ==
- Road to the Kentucky Oaks
