= Harry J. Aleo =

American businessman (1919–2008)

Harry Aleo
- Born: December 7, 1919; Noe Valley, San Francisco, California, United States
- Died: June 21, 2008 (aged 88); San Francisco, California, United States
- Occupations: Real Estate agent/investor, Racehorse owner
- Political party: Republican
- Partner: Deannie Bartlett
- Children: 3

Harry J. Aleo (December 7, 1919 – June 21, 2008) was an American businessman and owner of Thoroughbred racehorses.

== Early life ==
Born in Noe Valley, San Francisco, California, he was a lifelong resident of San Francisco. Aleo graduated from Mission High School. He signed a minor-league contract with the Brooklyn Dodgers, but ended his baseball career in 1940 after injuring his elbow.

== Career ==
During World War II, he served overseas with the United States Army, where among his campaigns he fought in the Battle of the Bulge. At war's end, Aleo returned home and founded Twin Peaks Properties, a real estate and insurance brokerage firm he owned and operated until his death.

In 1979, he became involved in the sport of Thoroughbred horse racing. Throughout his more than two decades in racing, his only trainer was Greg Gilchrist. His most famous horse was the ill-fated Lost in the Fog, who was voted the Eclipse Award as the 2005 American Champion Sprint Horse.

== Personal life ==
Aleo has three daughters. He died on June 21, 2008 from cancer.
