= Golden Gate Fields =

Former horse racing venue in California

Coordinates: 37°53′06″N 122°18′40″W

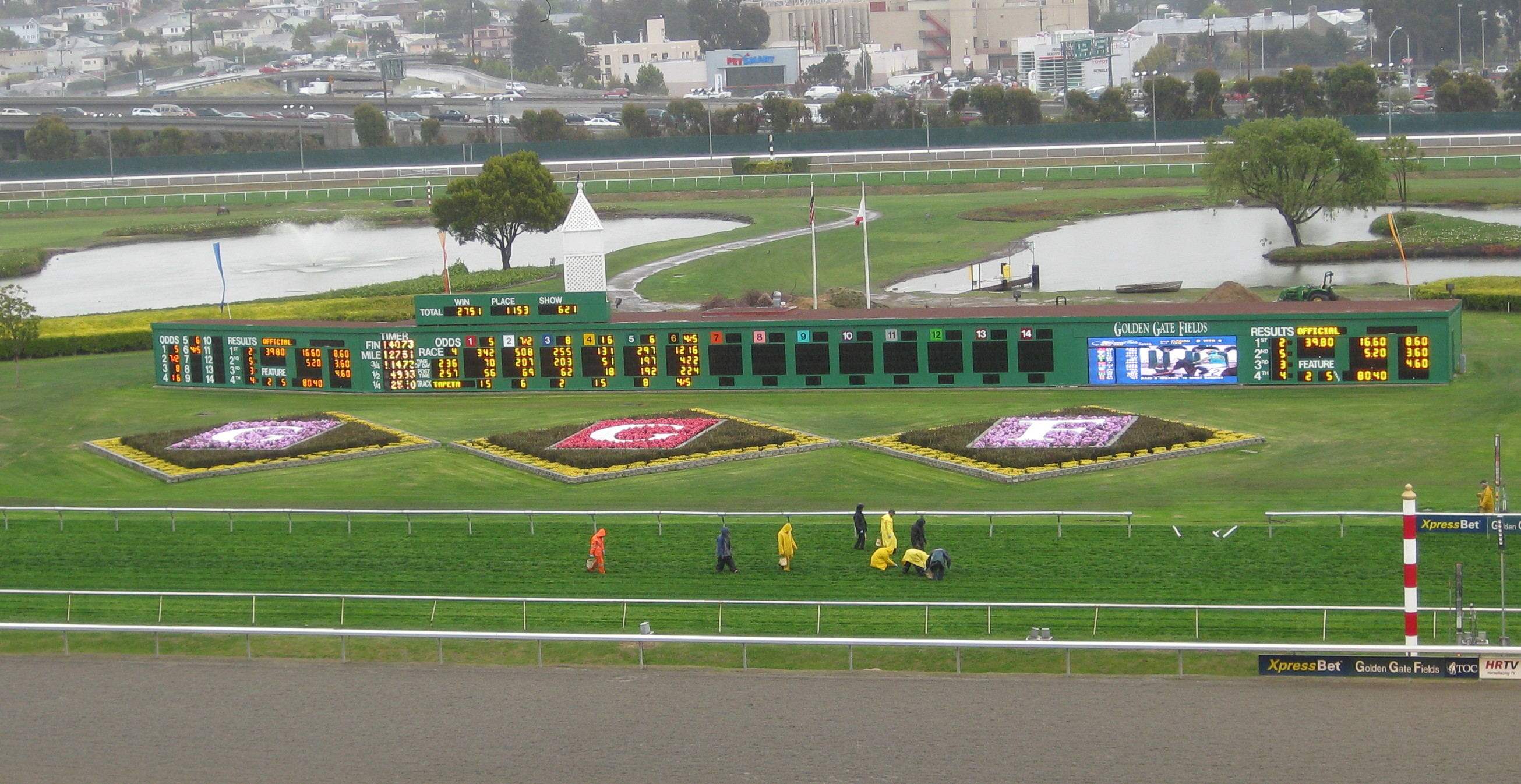
- Interactive map of Golden Gate Fields
- Location: Berkeley, California, United States
- Owned by: The Stronach Group
- Date opened: 1941
- Date closed: June 9, 2024
- Course type: Thoroughbred flat racing
- Notable races: San Francisco Mile Stakes; Golden Gate Derby; Berkeley Handicap

Golden Gate Fields was an American horse racing track straddling both Albany, California and Berkeley, California along the shoreline of San Francisco Bay adjacent to the Eastshore Freeway in the San Francisco Bay Area, United States. With the closing of the Bay Meadows racetrack on May 11, 2008, it was the last major Thoroughbred racetrack in Northern California. It was owned by The Stronach Group.

The track was set on 140 acres (0.57 km^{2}) of land in the cities of Albany and Berkeley. Golden Gate Fields' facilities included a one-mile (1,609 m) synthetic track and a turf course measuring 9/10 of a mile, or 7 furlongs plus 132 feet (1,448 m), stalls for 1,420 horses, a main grandstand with seating for about 8,000 customers, a clubhouse with seating for about 5,200 customers, a Turf Club with seating for about 1,500 customers and parking for over 8,500 cars. The synthetic track was called Tapeta and was installed in the summer of 2007.

On July 16, 2023, The Stronach Group announced that Golden Gate Fields would close at the end of the 2023 race meet. The closing was delayed tentatively until June 2024.

On June 9, 2024, Golden Gate Fields staged its final card, ending an 83-year run. A total of 5,936 people came to say farewell, with $3,057,912 wagered on the eight races by on-track patrons and simulcast/advance-deposit wagering players.

== History ==
Golden Gate Fields racetrack was situated on a tract of land bordered on the west by Fleming Point, a rocky promontory which lies on the eastern shoreline of San Francisco Bay. On the north, it is bordered by the Albany Bulb, Albany Beach and Albany Plateau, undeveloped terrain over a former landfill, owned by the City of Albany. To the east is Interstate 80 and to the south, the Berkeley Meadow. This tract lies on what was once a part of the slough into which three creeks drain: Schoolhouse Creek, Codornices Creek and Marin Creek. The tract had originally been that portion of the Rancho San Antonio owned by José Domingo Peralta. He sold it in July 1852 to John Fleming, who used it as a transhipment point for sending his cattle across the bay to San Francisco for slaughter and processing. Later in the 19th century, it was the site of the Giant Powder Company, a manufacturer of dynamite and nitroglycerin. Between 1879 and 1892, the plant blew up twice.

Competitive horse racing in this part of the East Bay originated with the Oakland Trotting Track about 2 miles south of the site of Golden Gate Fields, in what is now Emeryville. The Oakland Trotting Track was open from 1871 until it was forced to close in 1911 when the state banned horse racing. A fire in 1915 destroyed what remained of its structures. In 1933, the state repealed the ban on horse racing.

Just before World War II, Golden Gate Fields built its grandstand up against the eastern slope of Fleming Point, and adjacent marshland was filled in for the track. The inaugural meet was on February 1, 1941. In the period just before the war, the track was used as the scene of the crime central to the plot of the movie Shadow of the Thin Man.

With the onset of World War II, the United States Navy took over the property as the Naval Landing Force Equipment Depot, Albany for storing hundreds of landing craft destined for use in the Pacific theater. After the war, Golden Gate Fields resumed horse racing.

Golden Gate Fields was owned and managed for 25 years by San Francisco foreign car importer and horseman Kjell Qvale. In 1989, Golden Gate Fields was acquired by UK-based Ladbroke Racing. It was later acquired in 1999 by Magna Entertainment Corp., as Ladbroke wanted to divest of its non-European holdings. In March 2009, Magna filed for bankruptcy. The Stronach Group, the last owners, acquired Golden Gate Fields on July 3, 2011.

Golden Gate Fields made history in 2016 when it hired 29-year-old Angela Hermann as its track announcer, succeeding Michael Wrona. Hermann was the first full-time female race caller in the United States since Ann Elliott worked in the 1960s at Jefferson Downs near New Orleans.

== Racing ==
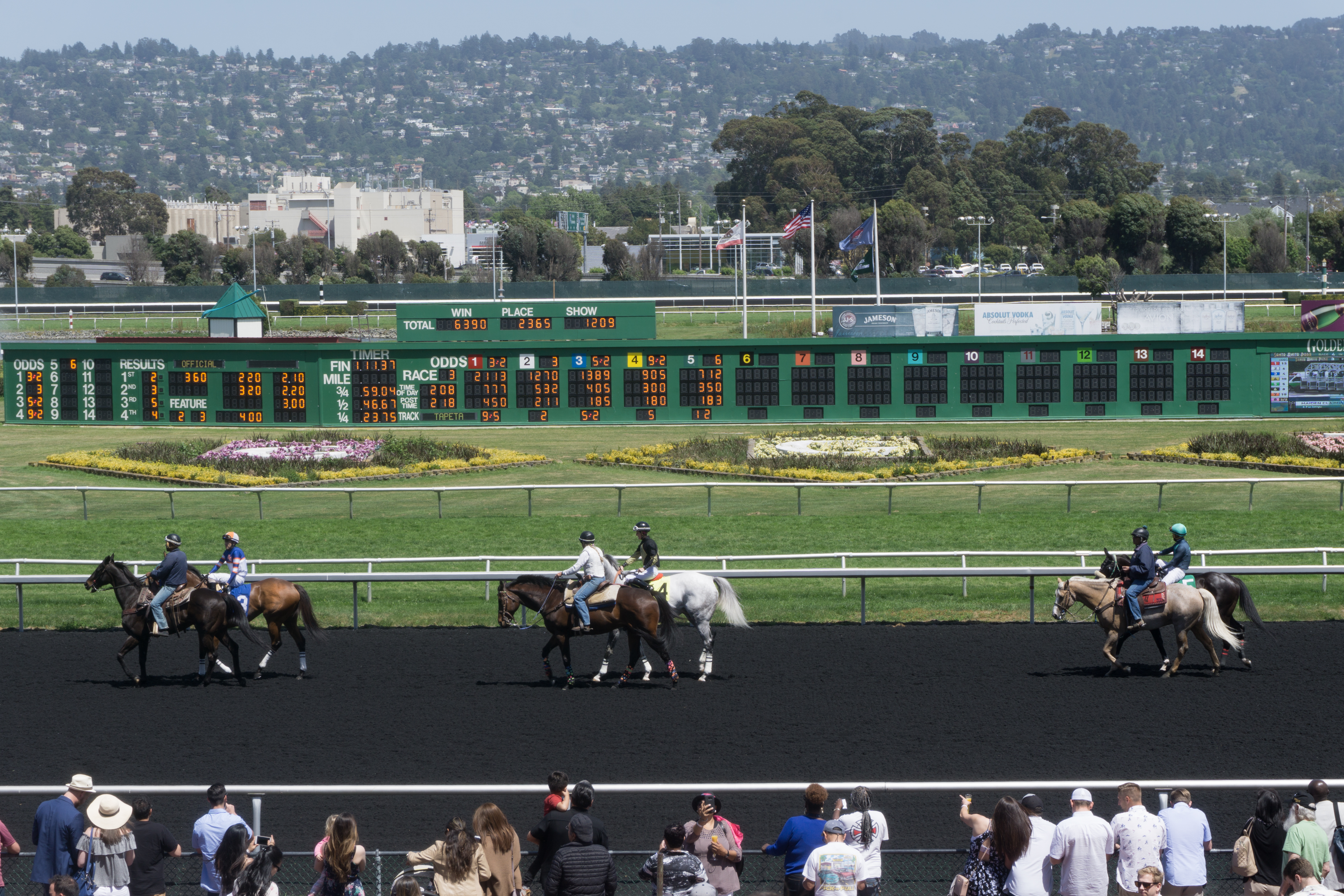
Horses and jockeys before a race at Golden Gate Fields

In 1950, Citation and Noor met in the Golden Gate Handicap. The English-bred Noor beat the great Triple Crown winner Citation, prompting Citation's rider, Steve Brooks, to say, "We just can't beat that horse."

In 1957, the horse Silky Sullivan came to the track and with him came the excitement that followed him throughout his life. Until the death of Lost in the Fog, he was also the only horse to be buried in the infield. Lost in the Fog's plaque was the third to be placed at Golden Gate Fields, near the one for Silky Sullivan and that for Bill Shoemaker.

The infield turf course was opened on February 22, 1972.

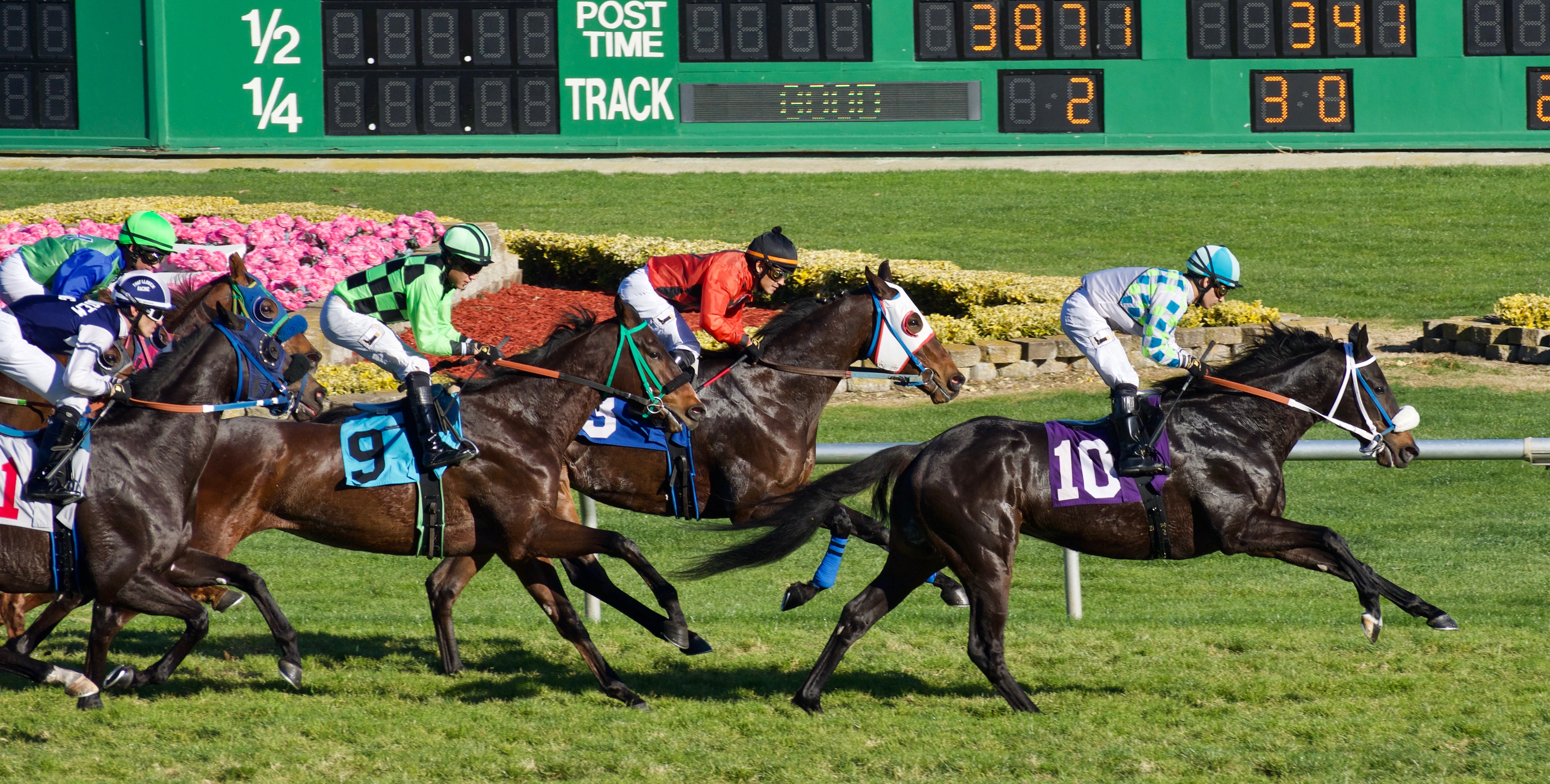
A race on turf in 2017

In 1974, the first $2 million day in Northern California was held on California Derby Day.

In 1984, the great gelding John Henry set a course record winning the Golden Gate Handicap.

Before his death in 2006, Lost in the Fog was based here. On September 17, 2006, he was euthanized due to inoperable tumors found on his spleen and along his spine. Prior to his early death, Lost in the Fog ran three races at his home base — winning twice and placing once. On September 30, 2006, Golden Gate Fields held a celebration of his life.

During the summer of 2007, the racetrack installed a polymer synthetic racing surface as mandated by the California Horse Racing Board. The Tapeta Footings all-weather surface was designed to make racing safer for both horses and riders.

On February 1, 2008, on board the horse Two Step Cat, Russell Baze got his 10,000th career win as a jockey. Baze won 54 riding titles and a total of 5,765 races at Golden Gate Fields during his career.

Shared Belief, the champion 2-year-old colt of 2013, was based at the track and won several races there.

With the loss of Bay Meadows to developers in 2008, Golden Gate Fields became Northern California's only major racetrack (aside from the racetracks associated with the summer fair circuit). The California Horse Racing Board (CHRB) sets the specific racing dates each year, but there is customarily a long winter/spring meet running from late December to mid-June, and a fall meet running from mid-October to mid-December. Starting in 2010, a summer meet was added with dates based around the summer fair circuit. On June 15, 2016, the CHRB presented a proposed 2017 calendar that would eliminate the summer meet.

=== Closure announcement ===
On July 16, 2023, Golden Gate Fields owners The Stronach Group announced that 2023 would be the last year of racing at Golden Gate Fields. In their announcement, The Stronach Group president and chief executive Belinda Stronach said that the future success of California racing "depends on a business model that encourages investment in Southern California," referring to Santa Anita Park and the San Luis Rey Downs training facility. The leaders of groups representing owners and trainers of thoroughbred horses in California, including the California Thoroughbred Trainers and the Thoroughbred Owners of California, expressed disappointment following The Stronach Group's announcement.

The last day of thoroughbred racing at Golden Gate Fields was scheduled to take place on December 18, 2023. During a committee meeting of the California Horse Racing Board in August 2023, the Thoroughbred Owners of California proposed a plan to keep Golden Gate Fields open until the following summer in an effort to provide short-term continuity for thoroughbred racing in the region. Aidan Butler, CEO of 1/ST Racing (parent company of The Stronach Group), said afterward that a winter-spring meet at Golden Gate in 2024 would be "completely contingent on the outcome of a sitdown." The following month, it was announced that the closing of Golden Gate Fields would be tentatively postponed until June 2024. The final day at Golden Gate Fields was June 9, 2024; the final race was won by Ireland's Adelie with jockey Assael Espinoza aboard.

== Transportation ==
AC Transit, the local public transit agency, provided a seasonal bus service, line 304, between the track and North Berkeley BART station until 2008. The track was also accessible from the Gilman Street and Albany exits of the Eastshore Freeway, as well as from adjacent city streets. The San Francisco Bay Trail, a bicycle and walking path passes between the bay and the track site. In 2009, East Shore Charter Lines was contracted to provide the racetrack with a new free service from the BART station.

== Racing events ==
The following Graded events were held at Golden Gate Fields in 2020.

Grade III

- Berkeley Handicap
- San Francisco Mile Stakes

The following were black-type listed stakes:

- El Camino Real Derby
- California Derby
- All American Stakes

The track hosted numerous overnight handicaps and ungraded stakes events.

- Albany Stakes
- Alcatraz Stakes
- California Oaks
- Campanile Stakes
- China Basin Stakes
- Corte Madera Stakes, 2-year-old fillies, 1 mile. $75,000 added
- Forty Niner Stakes, 3-year-olds and up, 1 1/16 miles. $75,000 added
- Gold Rush Stakes
- Golden Gate Fields Sprint, 4-year-olds and up, 6 furlongs, $75,000 added
- Golden Nugget Stakes. $50,000 added
- Golden Poppy
- Half Moon Bay Stakes
- Lost in the Fog Stakes
- Mill Valley Stakes
- Miss America Stakes, fillies and mares, 3 year olds and up, 1 1/8 miles, turf. $75,000 added
- Oakland Stakes, 3-year-olds and up, 6 furlongs. $75,000 added
- Pacific Heights Stakes, 3-year-olds and up (Cal-breds), 1 1/16 miles. $75,000 added
- Raise Your Skirts, 4-year-olds and up, fillies and mares, 6 furlongs, $75,000 added
- Sausalito Stakes, 3-year-olds and up, 6 furlongs. $75,000 added
- Silky Sullivan Handicap
- Silveyville Stakes, 1 1/16 miles. $73,500 added
- Stinson Beach Stakes, 3-year-olds, 6 furlongs. $50,000 added
- Tanforan Stakes, 3-year-olds and up, 1 3/8 miles, turf. $75,000 added
- Tiburon Handicap, 3-year-old fillies, 6 furlongs. $75,000 added
- Work the Crowd, 4-year-olds and up, fillies and mares (Cal-breds), 1 1/16 miles. $75,000 added

== In popular culture ==
- Punk rock band Rancid wrote and performed the song "GGF", about lead singer Tim Armstrong's childhood near Golden Gate Fields, on their 2000 self-titled album.
- Golden Gate Fields was featured in the Rancid video "Last One to Die".
- In On the Road by Jack Kerouac, Sal Paradise visits Golden Gate Fields with his friend Remi Boncœur, who loses all their money before the seventh race.
- In the movie Metro starring Eddie Murphy and Michael Rapaport, Murphy's character is seen at Golden Gate Fields betting on a race and blaming jockey Russell Baze for losing his money.

== Notes and references ==
- A Selective History of the Codornices-University Village..., by Warren and Catherine Lee, Imprint (Albuquerque, N.M.): Belvidere Delaware Railroad Company Enterprises, Ltd., (2000).
