= Bay Meadows Racetrack =

Auto and horse racing track in San Mateo, California

Coordinates: 37.5434°N 122.2977°W

- Interactive map of Bay Meadows Racetrack
- Location: San Mateo, California
- Date opened: November 13, 1934
- Date closed: August 17, 2008
- Race type: Thoroughbred

Bay Meadows was a horse racing track in San Mateo, California from 1934 until 2008, in the San Francisco Bay Area in the United States.

== History ==
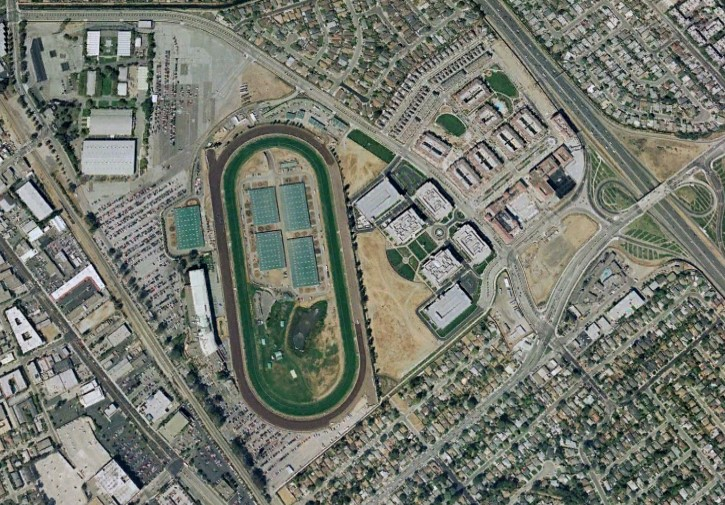
Aerial view of the track in 2002 prior to demolition

Built on the site of an old airfield, Bay Meadows Racecourse was the longest continually operating thoroughbred racetrack in California—having been founded on November 13, 1934—until its closure on August 17, 2008. The innovative William P. Kyne introduced pari-mutuel wagering, the popular daily double, the first all-enclosed starting gate, the totalizator board and the photo-finish camera at Bay Meadows.

Prior to the track's closure, the Bay Meadows Handicap had been the longest continually run stakes event in California, having been started in 1934. Seabiscuit won this race twice: 1937 and 1938. The track was allowed to remain open during World War II because of its agreement to give 92% of its profits towards the war effort. The track generated more than $4 million for War Relief projects during the war years. Its ability to run during the war accounts for its status as the longest continually operating US racetrack. In 1945, the first racehorse to be transported by plane, El Lobo, was set down in the parking lot.

In 1948, the eventual Hall of Fame jockey, Bill Shoemaker, began his career by exercising horses on this track. He won his first stakes race here in 1949.

In 1950 and 1951 the Bay Meadows 150 AAA Indy Car race was run at the track.

In 1954, 1955 and 1956 the track was used for NASCAR. In the 1955 event, Elias Bowie became the first African-American to start a top-level NASCAR race.

All of the exterior scenes in Stanley Kubrick's 1956 heist movie The Killing were filmed at Bay Meadows. The track was renamed as Lansdowne for the movie but the Bay Meadows name is visible in at least one early scene.

Bay Meadows' racing season began in August with the San Mateo County Fair portion of the meet, which ran two weeks. This was followed by a short break of a few days and until recently, this break avoided conflict with the first week-and-a-half of the California State Fair horse race meet. Racing picked up again on Labor Day Weekend (or thereabouts) with the main thoroughbred meet, which was split into two parts—one in the fall, the other in the spring/early summer (Golden Gate Fields' meet took place in the interim in the winter/early spring).

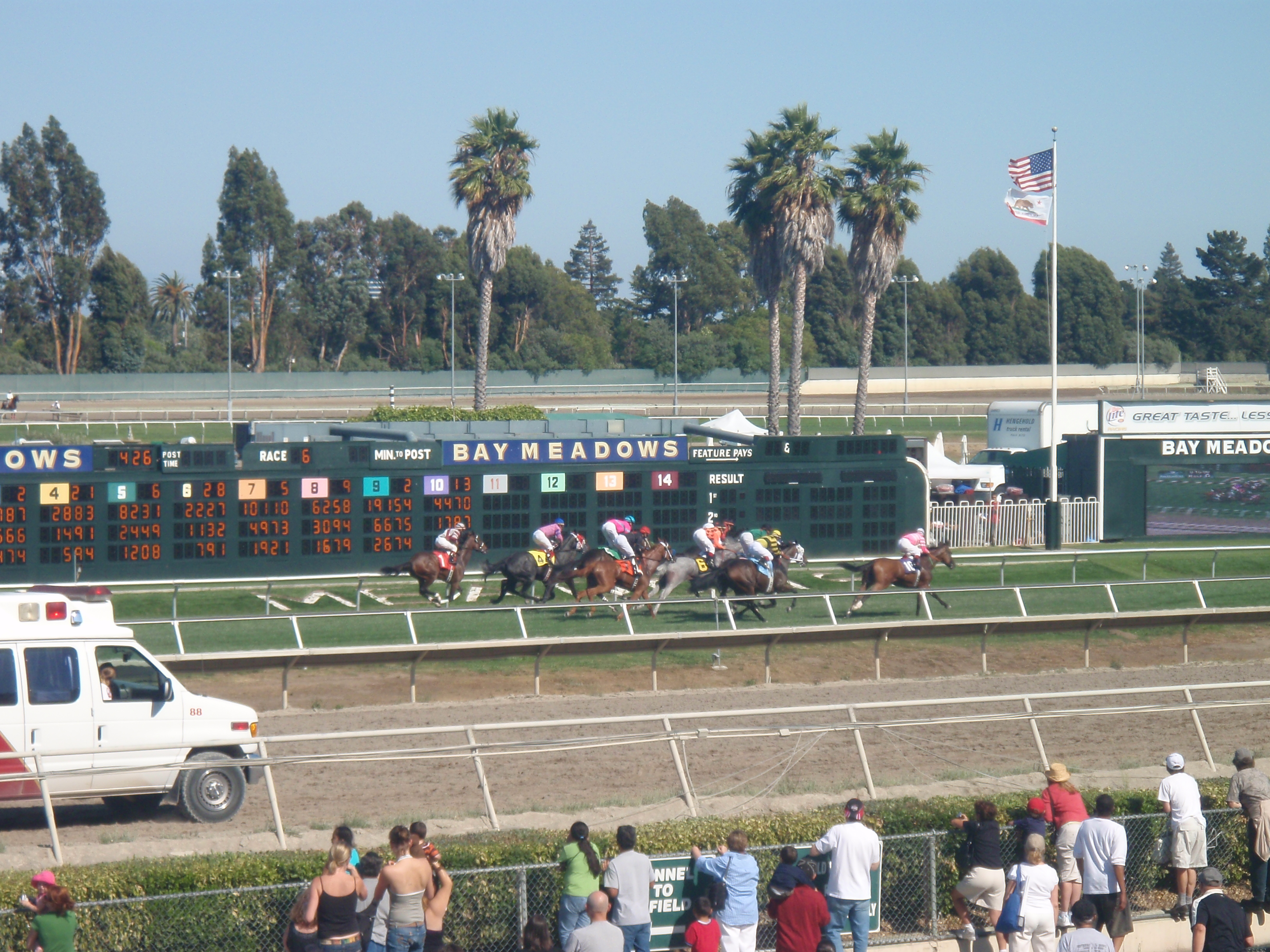
Bay Meadows 6th Race on Saturday, August 16, 2008.

Throughout its history, Bay Meadows has also hosted harness and quarter horse racing meets but due to the low revenue such events generate, they were not run in the final years of the track. At the end, Bay Meadows focused exclusively on thoroughbred racing. Olden Times, Silky Sullivan, Citation, John Henry, Round Table and Lost in the Fog have raced here. In 1954, Determine won the Bay Meadows Derby then went to take the Kentucky Derby. Wild Again ran at Bay Meadows in 1984 and went on to win the Breeders' Cup Classic. On December 1, 2006, jockey Russell Baze won the fourth race to pass Laffit Pincay, Jr. as the winningest rider ever in thoroughbred horse racing.

There was talk through the 2000s of demolishing Bay Meadows due to plans to build an entirely new racetrack near Dixon, California to replace the San Mateo race track so Bay Meadows remained open on a year-by-year case basis. The Bay Meadows Phase II Specific Plan Amendment was adopted by the city council of the city of San Mateo on November 7, 2005. The plan called for 1,250,000 square feet (116,000 m^{2}) of office space, 1,250 residential units, 150,000 square feet (14,000 m^{2}) of retail space, and 15 acres (61,000 m^{2}) of public parks, as well as a rebuilt Hillsdale Caltrain station near the site of the old Bay Meadows Caltrain station.

=== Physical attributes ===
Bay Meadows had a 1 mile (1.6 km) dirt oval and a seven furlong 0.875 miles (1.408 km) turf oval. The track had a total seating capacity of 12,000 and had stabling for 900 horses on site.

== Closure ==
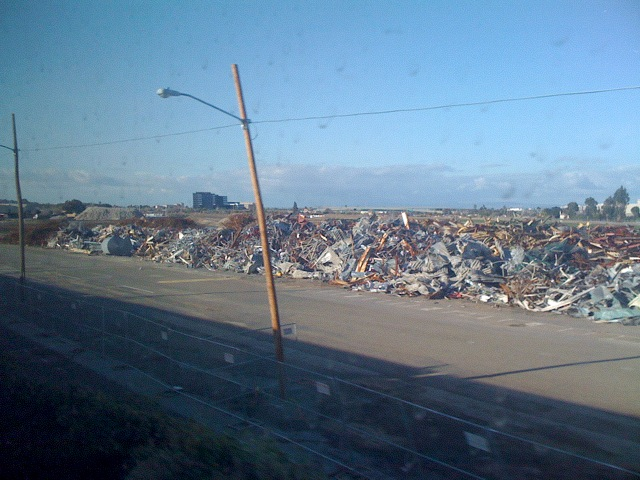
One of the piles of debris left over after demolition of the Bay Meadows racetrack. Taken from a passing Caltrain train in March 2009.

After the track failed to acquire a two-year extension of the deadline to replace its dirt oval with an artificial surface for the safety of the horses from the California Horse Racing Board, it was announced that Bay Meadows intended to close November 4, 2006 immediately following its summer-fall season.

On July 3, 2007, the California Horse Racing Board unanimously voted to approve a one-year exemption for Bay Meadows to continue horse racing in 2008 on its current racing surface. Bay Meadows was open to race for its last Spring Meet, February 6, 2008, to May 11, 2008. From May 14 to August 4, simulcasting occurred in Bay Meadows every open day, with free parking on August 4, free admission on August 11, and both on August 18. There were ten final race dates run in August 2008 for the San Mateo County Fair, with the last official race occurring on August 17, 2008. The last day Bay Meadows was open for simulcasting was on August 18, 2008.

An auction for Bay Meadows paintings occurred from August 23 to 25.

Construction began on a housing and commercial development in September 2008. Criticism from local newspapers and community groups came when, after the demolition of the grandstand and clubhouse, debris waiting to be recycled was left in "unsightly" piles on the site for several months.

== Racing ==
Bay Meadows had the following graded stakes events:

- Grade 3 Bay Meadows Breeders' Cup Handicap
- Grade 3 Bay Meadows Derby
- Grade 3 California Juvenile Stakes
- Grade 3 El Camino Real Derby
- Grade 3 Seabiscuit Handicap (Bay Meadows)

And the following important ungraded events.

- Bay Meadows Breeders' Cup Sprint Handicap
- California Oaks, called Bay Meadows Oaks

== See also ==
- Bay Meadows II (Neighborhood)
