= Jose Valdivia Jr. =

Peruvian jockey (born 1974)

Personal information
- Born: December 8, 1974 (age 51) Lima, Peru
- Occupation: Jockey

Horse racing career
- Sport: Horse racing
- Career wins: ongoing

Major racing wins
- Bay Meadows Breeders' Cup Sprint (1999); Oak Leaf Stakes (2001); Oak Tree Breeders' Cup Mile Stakes (2001, 2002); San Gabriel Handicap (2002); Beverly D. Stakes (2003); Hawthorne Handicap (2003); Landaluce Stakes (2003); Los Angeles Handicap (2003); Santa Anita Derby (2004); Tuzla Handicap (2004); Vernon O. Underwood Stakes (2004); San Juan Capistrano Handicap (2004); Manhattan Handicap (2004); Palomar Breeders' Cup Handicap (2004); Del Mar Oaks (2006); Del Mar Derby (2006); E. P. Taylor Stakes (2006); Eddie Logan Stakes (2006); All Along Stakes (2007); Dahlia Handicap (2008); New York Stakes (2009); Hollywood Gold Cup (2009); New York Breeders' Futurity (2018); Stars and Stripes Stakes (2018) Breeders' Cup wins: Breeders' Cup Mile (2001) Triple Crown wins: Belmont Stakes (2011)

Significant horses
- Big Jag, Val Royal, Arravale, Rail Trip, Ruler on Ice
- Updated on March 22, 2007

Jose Valdivia Jr. (born December 8, 1974) is a Peruvian jockey who competes in American Thoroughbred horse racing. The son of a top South American jockey, he is the nephew of retired jockey Fernando Toro and trainer, Juan Suarez. He and his family moved to the United States in 1989 and settled in the Hollywood, Florida, area where his father worked as a trainer. In 2000, he married his wife Renee. The couple have two children, Siena and Luca.

In 1994, Valdivia began his professional riding career as an apprentice at Belmont Park, earning his first win in just his third start. Riding for fellow Peruvian, trainer Julio Canani, his first important win came aboard Val Royal when he won the 2001 Breeders' Cup Mile at Belmont Park and that year became a breakout year.

== Year-end charts ==
Chart (2001–present)	Peak position
National Earnings List for Jockeys 2001	52
National Earnings List for Jockeys 2002	62
National Earnings List for Jockeys 2003	37
National Earnings List for Jockeys 2004	35
National Earnings List for Jockeys 2005	58
National Earnings List for Jockeys 2006	46
National Earnings List for Jockeys 2007	61
National Earnings List for Jockeys 2008	81
National Earnings List for Jockeys 2009	90
National Earnings List for Jockeys 2010	85
National Earnings List for Jockeys 2011	94
