= Russell Baze =

American jockey

Russell Avery Baze
Personal information
- Born: August 7, 1958 (age 68) Vancouver, British Columbia, Canada
- Occupation: Jockey

Horse racing career
- Sport: Horse racing
- Career wins: 12,844

Major racing wins
- Gottstein Futurity (1975, 1983); Silky Sullivan Handicap (1981, 1988); California Derby (1981); Golden Gate Fields Handicap (1982, 2000); Bay Meadows Handicap (1982, 1995, 2005); Oak Tree Invitational Stakes (1984,1989); El Camino Real Derby (1984, 1998, 2005, 2006, 2007, 2009, 2010, 2011, 2014); Del Mar Debutante Stakes (1986); Longacres Mile Handicap (1988, 2003, 2004); San Carlos Handicap (1990); San Gorgonio Handicap (1990); Oak Leaf Stakes (1990); Bed O' Roses Breeders' Cup Handicap (1991); Yerba Buena Handicap (1992, 1995, 2002, 2005); Oklahoma Derby (1996); Jim Beam Stakes (1998); Lane's End Stakes (1998); Bay Meadows Breeders' Cup Sprint (2002); Bay Shore Stakes (2005); King's Bishop Stakes (2005); Sunshine Millions Dash (2005); Churchill Downs Handicap (2006); Aristides Breeders' Cup Stakes (2006); Azalea Breeders' Cup Stakes (2008); California Cup Juvenile (2007); California Oaks (2009); Lost in the Fog Stakes (2009); Sunshine Millions Classic (2010); San Francisco Breeders' Cup Mile 2010; Ancient Title Stakes (2010); All American Stakes (2013); Berkeley Handicap (2013, 2015)

Racing awards
- George Woolf Memorial Jockey Award (2002); Isaac Murphy Award (1995–2003, 2005–2007); Eclipse Special Award (1995); United States Champion Jockey by wins (1992–1996, 2000, 2002, 2005, 2007, 2008)

Honours
- United States Racing Hall of Fame (1999); State of Washington Sports Hall of Fame (2012)

Significant horses
- Lost in the Fog; Bold Chieftain
- Updated on May 8, 2008

Russell Avery Baze (born 7 August 1958) is a retired Canadian-American horse racing jockey. He holds the record for the most race wins in North American horse racing history, and is a member of the United States Racing Hall of Fame and the State of Washington Sports Hall of Fame.

== Family background ==
Born to an American family, Baze's father, Joe Baze, is a former jockey and trainer who was competing at Exhibition Park in Vancouver at the time of his birth giving him dual Canadian/American citizenship.

== Riding career ==
Baze began his racing career in Walla Walla, Washington in 1974 and won his first race that fall at the Yakima racetrack. By the early 1980s he was making a name for himself, winning racing titles at northern California racetracks including a victory in the 1981 California Derby. Baze went on to lead United States thoroughbred horse racing in victories ten times. He has won 36 riding titles at Bay Meadows racetrack in San Mateo, California and 27 titles at Golden Gate Fields in Albany, California.

After winning 400 or more races in a year for four consecutive years, Baze got his big break by being honored with a special Eclipse Award in 1995. Since then he has won 400 or more races in a year seven additional times; no other jockey has accomplished that feat more than three times.

In 1999, Baze was inducted into the National Museum of Racing and Hall of Fame and in 2002, he was voted the recipient of the prestigious George Woolf Memorial Jockey Award by his peers. Since the inauguration of the Isaac Murphy Award in 1995, presented annually by the National Turf Writers Association to the jockey with the highest winning percentage in North America, Baze has won it 13 of 14 years, coming in second in 2004.

== Achievements ==
On October 14, 1989, Baze was aboard Hawkster when that three-year-old colt set the Santa Anita Park track record for 1 1/2 miles on turf. Baze gained a lot more fame in the fourth race at Bay Meadows on December 1, 2006, by setting the world's all-time record for most career victories, passing jockey Laffit Pincay Jr., by winning career race 9,531 aboard Butterfly Belle, owned by Jim Pitzer Sr. of Washington. Among other noteworthy accomplishments, during the two days of October 17 and 18, 2007, Baze won eleven races.

Although he had won every other stakes race at Golden Gate Fields, Russell had never won the track's most prestigious race: the San Francisco Breeders' Cup Mile. That changed on April 24, 2010 when he took the race on Bold Chieftain from the pacesetter, Monterey Jazz.

== Milestones ==
On February 1, 2008, at Golden Gate Fields, Baze rode Two Step Cat to a photo finish victory in the third race to become the first North American rider to win 10,000 races. On August 14, 2010, in the fourth race at the Sonoma County Fairgrounds in Santa Rosa, California, Baze rode Separate Forest, a first-time starter, to his 11,000th win.

Russell frequently rode 4-time winning bay gelding Sir Mowgli XVII, who is now a leading Hunter competing throughout the Southwest, having recently relocated to Durango Farms in Coto de Caza, CA.

On July 7, 2013, in Pleasanton, California, riding Handful of Pearls, Baze won the final race on the last day of the Alameda County Fair, making it his 12,000th win and his 4th win of the day.

== Personal life ==
Baze and his wife Tami have four children. Their daughter Trinity is married to former jockey Kyle Kaenel, whose father, Jack Kaenel, won the Preakness Stakes at age 16.

== Year-end charts ==
Chart (2000–present)	Peak position
National Earnings List for Jockeys 2000	28
National Earnings List for Jockeys 2001	20
National Earnings List for Jockeys 2002	22
National Earnings List for Jockeys 2003	24
National Earnings List for Jockeys 2004	33
National Earnings List for Jockeys 2005	21
National Earnings List for Jockeys 2006	23
National Earnings List for Jockeys 2007	27
National Earnings List for Jockeys 2008	26
National Earnings List for Jockeys 2009	32
National Earnings List for Jockeys 2010	35
National Earnings List for Jockeys 2011	41
National Earnings List for Jockeys 2012	37
National Earnings List for Jockeys 2013	44
National Earnings List for Jockeys 2014	38
National Earnings List for Jockeys 2015	53
