= 1984 in sports =

1984 in sports describes the year's events in world sport.

== Alpine Skiing ==
- Alpine Skiing World Cup:
  - Men's overall season champion: Pirmin Zurbriggen, Switzerland
  - Women's overall season champion: Erika Hess, Switzerland
- At the Winter Olympics, Bill Johnson becomes the first American to win the gold medal in downhill skiing.

== American football ==
- Super Bowl XVIII – the Los Angeles Raiders (AFC) won 38–9 over the Washington Redskins (NFC)
  - Location: Tampa Stadium
  - Attendance: 72,920
  - MVP: Marcus Allen, RB (Los Angeles)
- Walter Payton breaks Jim Brown's rushing record on October 7.
- Philadelphia Stars win United States Football League Championship, 23-3 over Arizona Wranglers
- Orange Bowl (1983 season):
  - The Miami Hurricanes won 31-30 over the Nebraska Cornhuskers to win the national championship
- Doug Flutie wins the Heisman Trophy
- November 23 – The Hail Flutie Game
- 1984 college football season:
  - The Brigham Young Cougars win the national championship following their victory in the Holiday Bowl on December 21

== Association football ==
- European Championship – Final: France 2-0 Spain; Hosts: France
- Asian Cup – Final: Saudi Arabia 2 – 0 P.R. China; Hosts: Singapore
- Champions' Cup – – May 30 – Liverpool 1-1 A.S. Roma; Liverpool won 4-2 on penalties after extra time.
- UEFA Cup – Two legs; 1st leg Anderlecht 1-1 Tottenham Hotspur; 2nd leg Tottenham Hotspur 1-1 Anderlecht; 2-2 on aggregate, Spurs won 4-2 on penalties
- Cup Winners' Cup – Juventus 2-1 Porto
- Super Cup – Juventus 2-0 Liverpool
- Copa Libertadores de América – Two legs; 1st leg Grêmio 0-1 Independiente; 2nd leg Independiente 0-0 Grêmio; Independiente won 1-0 on aggregate
- England – FA Cup – – May 12 – Everton win 2-0 against Watford
- FIFA gives the right to host the 1990 FIFA World Cup to Italy
- The North American Soccer League folds due to financial problems

== Australian rules football ==
- Victorian Football League
  - March 31: Carlton 31.13 (199) beat North Melbourne 9.8 (62) at VFL Park. This remains the largest opening round win in League history.
  - July 28: On a waterlogged Western Oval, Footscray and Essendon play a goalless first half. It is the first time this has occurred since 1968 and only the second since 1899.
  - Essendon wins the 88th VFL Premiership, defeating Hawthorn 14.21 (105) to 12.9 (81) in the Grand Final
  - Brownlow Medal awarded to Peter Moore (Melbourne)
- West Australian Football League
  - May 5: West Perth 15.15 (105) draw with South Fremantle 16.9 (105) at Leederville Oval for the first senior WAFL draw in 888 matches since East Fremantle and Swan Districts each scored 11.14 (80) at East Fremantle Oval on April 21 of 1974. This constitutes the second-longest non-occurrence of draws in a major Australian Rules competition; ironically the only longer one ended with a draw between the same two clubs at the same ground.

== Baseball ==
- January 10 – Luis Aparicio, Harmon Killebrew, and Don Drysdale are elected to the Baseball Hall of Fame
- World Series – Detroit Tigers win 4 games to 1 over the San Diego Padres

== Basketball ==
- Donald Sterling relocates the San Diego Clippers to Los Angeles.
- NCAA Men's Basketball Championship –
  - Georgetown wins 84-75 over Houston
- NCAA Division I Women's Basketball Championship
  - University of Southern California(USC) wins 72–61 over Tennessee
- NBA Finals –
  - Boston Celtics won 4 games to 3 over the Los Angeles Lakers
- National Basketball League (Australia) Finals:
  - Canberra Cannons defeated the Brisbane Bullets 84-82 in the final.
- Central Missouri State University won the NCAA Division II men's and women's basketball titles, becoming the first school ever in any division to accomplish the feat. The University of Connecticut would do the same in Division I in 2004.
- NBA draft –
  - A new era in the NBA is born on June 23 with the drafting of Houston's Hakeem Olajuwon, North Carolina's Michael Jordan, Auburn's Charles Barkley and Gonzaga's John Stockton.

== Boxing ==
- March 31 – Wilfredo Gómez defeats Juan Laporte by a decision in 12 rounds to conquer the WBC's world Featherweight crown.
- June 15 – in the most anticipated bout of the year, Thomas Hearns, WBC world Jr. Middleweight champion, knocks out WBA world champion Roberto Durán in two rounds. The WBA elects not to sanction the bout, declaring their version of the title vacant instead.

== Canadian football ==
- Grey Cup – Winnipeg Blue Bombers won 47–17 over the Hamilton Tiger-Cats
- Vanier Cup – Guelph Gryphons won 22–13 over the Mount Allison Mounties

== Cricket ==
- Inaugural edition of the Asia Cup is held in Sharjah, UAE: India defeats Pakistan in the final.

== Cycling ==
- Giro d'Italia won by Francesco Moser of Italy
- Tour de France – Laurent Fignon of France
- UCI Road World Championships – Men's road race – Claude Criquielion of Belgium

== Dog sledding ==
- Iditarod Trail Sled Dog Race Champion –
  - Dean Osmar wins with lead dogs: Red & Bullet

== Field hockey ==
- Olympic Games (Men's Competition) won by Pakistan
- Olympic Games (Women's Competition) won by the Netherlands
- Men's Champions Trophy held in Karachi won by Australia
- Women's European Nations Cup held in Lille won by the Netherlands

== Figure skating ==
- World Figure Skating Championships –
  - Men's champion: Scott Hamilton, United States
  - Ladies' champion: Katarina Witt, East Germany
  - Pair skating champions: Barbara Underhill & Paul Martini, Canada
  - Ice dancing champions: Jayne Torvill & Christopher Dean, Great Britain

== Gaelic Athletic Association ==
- Camogie
  - All-Ireland Camogie Champion: Dublin
  - National Camogie League: Cork
- Gaelic football
  - All-Ireland Senior Football Championship – Kerry 1-11 defeated Dublin 1-6
  - National Football League – Kerry 1-11 defeated Galway 0-11
- Ladies' Gaelic football
  - All-Ireland Senior Football Champion: Kerry
  - National Football League: Kerry
- Hurling
  - All-Ireland Senior Hurling Championship – Cork 3-16 defeated Offaly 1-12
  - National Hurling League – Limerick 3–16 beat Wexford 1–9

== Golf ==
Men's professional

- Masters Tournament – Ben Crenshaw
- U.S. Open – Fuzzy Zoeller
- British Open – Seve Ballesteros
- PGA Championship – Lee Trevino
- PGA Tour money leader – Tom Watson – $476,260
- Senior PGA Tour money leader – Don January – $328,597

Men's amateur

- British Amateur – José María Olazábal
- U.S. Amateur – Scott Verplank

Women's professional

- Nabisco Dinah Shore – Juli Inkster
- LPGA Championship – Patty Sheehan
- U.S. Women's Open – Hollis Stacy
- Classique du Maurier Classic – Juli Inkster
- LPGA Tour money leader – Betsy King – $266,771

== Harness racing ==
- North America Cup – the inaugural event won by Legal Notice
- United States Pacing Triple Crown races –
  1. Cane Pace – On the Road Again
  2. Little Brown Jug – Colt Fortysix
  3. Messenger Stakes – Troublemaker
- United States Trotting Triple Crown races –
  1. Hambletonian – Historic Freight
  2. Yonkers Trot – Baltic Speed
  3. Kentucky Futurity – Fancy Crown
- Australian Inter Dominion Harness Racing Championship –
  - Pacers: Gammalite
  - Trotters: Sir Castleton

== Horse racing ==
Steeplechases

- Cheltenham Gold Cup – Burrough Hill Lad
- Grand National – Hallo Dandy

Flat races

- Australia – Melbourne Cup won by Black Knight
- Canada – Queen's Plate won by Key to the Moon
- France – Prix de l'Arc de Triomphe won by Sagace
- Ireland – Irish Derby Stakes won by El Gran Senor
- Japan – Japan Cup won by Katsuragi Ace
- English Triple Crown Races:
  1. 2,000 Guineas Stakes – El Gran Senor
  2. The Derby – Secreto
  3. St. Leger Stakes – Commanche Run
- United States Triple Crown Races:
  1. Kentucky Derby – Swale
  2. Preakness Stakes – Gate Dancer
  3. Belmont Stakes – Swale
- Breeders' Cup World Thoroughbred Championships:
  1. Breeders' Cup Classic – Wild Again
  2. Breeders' Cup Distaff – Princess Rooney
  3. Breeders' Cup Juvenile – Chief's Crown
  4. Breeders' Cup Juvenile Fillies – Outstandingly
  5. Breeders' Cup Mile – Royal Heroine
  6. Breeders' Cup Sprint – Eillo
  7. Breeders' Cup Turf – Lashkari

== Ice hockey ==
- Art Ross Trophy as the NHL's leading scorer during the regular season: Wayne Gretzky, Edmonton Oilers
- Hart Memorial Trophy for the NHL's Most Valuable Player: Wayne Gretzky, Edmonton Oilers
- Stanley Cup – Edmonton Oilers won 4 games to 1 over the New York Islanders
- World Hockey Championship –
  - Men's champion: (vacant) – the USSR won the Olympic Gold Medal
  - Junior Men's champion: USSR defeated Finland

== Olympic Games ==
- 1984 Summer Olympics takes place at Los Angeles (July 28 - August 12)
  - USA wins the most medals (174) and the most gold medals (83)
- 1984 Winter Olympics takes place at Sarajevo (February 8 - February 19)
  - USSR wins the most medals (25) and the GDR wins the most gold medals (9)

== Pickleball ==
- U.S. Amateur Pickleball Association, now USA Pickleball, formed.

== Radiosport ==
- Second Amateur Radio Direction Finding World Championship held in Oslo, Norway.

== Rugby league ==
- 1984 Great Britain Lions tour
- 1984 National Panasonic Cup
- 1984 New Zealand rugby league season
- 1984 NSWRL season
- 1983–84 Rugby Football League season / 1984–85 Rugby Football League season
- 1984 State of Origin series

== Rugby union ==
- 90th Five Nations Championship series is won by Scotland who complete the Grand Slam

== Shooting Sports ==
- The National Rifle Association of America takes control of the Bianchi Cup and designates it the National Action Pistol Championship

== Snooker ==
- World Snooker Championship – Steve Davis beats Jimmy White 18-16
- World rankings – Steve Davis remains world number one for 1984/85

== Swimming ==
- XXIII Olympic Games, held in Los Angeles (July 29 – August 4)

== Tennis ==
- Grand Slam in tennis men's results:
  1. Australian Open – Mats Wilander
  2. French Open – Ivan Lendl
  3. Wimbledon – John McEnroe
  4. US Open – John McEnroe
- Grand Slam in tennis women's results:
  1. Australian Open – Chris Evert
  2. French Open – Martina Navratilova
  3. Wimbledon – Martina Navratilova
  4. U.S. Open – Martina Navratilova
- 1984 Summer Olympics
  - Men's Singles competition
  1. Gold – Stefan Edberg
  2. Silver – Francisco Maciel
  3. Bronze – Jimmy Arias and Paolo Canè
  - Women's Singles competition
  1. Gold – Steffi Graf
  2. Silver – Sabrina Goleš
  3. Bronze – Raffaella Reggi and Catherine Tanvier
- 1984 Davis Cup
  - Sweden wins 4-1 over the United States in Men's world tennis.
- 1984 Federation Cup
  - Czechoslovakia wins over Australia in Women's world tennis.

== Water polo ==
- Olympic Games (Men's Competition) won by Yugoslavia

== Awards ==
- Associated Press Male Athlete of the Year – Carl Lewis, Track and field
- Associated Press Female Athlete of the Year – Mary Lou Retton, Gymnastics
