= Hutcheson Stakes top three finishers and starters =

This is a listing of the horses that finished in either first, second, or third place and the number of starters in the Hutcheson Stakes, an American Grade 2 race for three-year-olds at 7 furlongs on dirt held at Gulfstream Park in Hallandale Beach, Florida. (List 1973-present)

Year	Winner	Second	Third	Starters
2014	Wildcat Red	C. Zee	Pablo del Monte	9
2013	Honorable Dillon	Forty Tales	Undrafted	8
2012	Thunder Moccasin	Il Villano	Quick Wit	5
2011	Flashpoint	Travlin Man	Little Drama	9
2010	D' Funnybone	A Little Warm	Ibboyee	7
2009	Capt. Candyman Can	Hello Broadway	Bee Cee Cee	6
2008	Smooth Air	Silver Edition	Halo Najib	8
2007	King of the Roxy	Bold Start	Out of Gwenda	9
2006	Keyed Entry	First Samurai	Express News	7
2005	Proud Accolade	Park Avenue Ball	Vicarage	6
2004	Limehouse	Deputy Storm	Saratoga County	10
2003	Lion Tamer	Strength Within	Crafty Guy	6
2002	Showmeitall	Monthir	Royal Lad	6
2001	Yonaguska	City Zip	Sparkling Sabre	11
2000	More Than Ready (DH)	Summer Note (DH)	American Bullet	8
1999	Bet Me Best	Texas Glitter	Cat Thief	7
1998	Time Limit	Coronado's Quest	Zippy Zeal	5
1997	Frisk Me Now	Confide	Crown Ambassador	8
1996	Appealing Skier	Unbridled's Song	Gold Fever	5
1995	Valid Wager	Mr. Greeley	Don Juan A	7
1994	Holy Bull	Patton	You and I	5
1993	Hidden Trick	Great Navigator	Forever Whirl	9
1992	My Luck Runs North	Sneaky Solicitor	Frosted Spy	9
1991	Fly So Free	To Freedom	Sunny and Pleasant	10
1990	Housebuster	Yonder	Stalker	11
1989	Dixieland Brass	Western Playboy	Tricky Creek	12
1988	Perfect Spy	Forty Niner	Notebook	7
1987	Well Selected	Gone West	Faster Than Sound	8
1986	Papal Power	Raja's Revenge	Mr. Classic	10
1985	Banner Bob	Creme Fraiche	Do It Again Dan	12
1984	Swale	For Halo	Darn That Alarm	12
1983	Current Hope	Highland Park	Country Pine	13
1982	Distinctive Pro	Center Cut	Real Twister	6
1981	Lord Avie	Spirited Boy	Linnleur	7
1980	Plugged Nickle	Execution's Reason	One Son	6
1979	Spectacular Bid	Lot o' Gold	Northern Prospect	4
1978	Sensitive Prince	Kissing U.	Pipe Major	11
1977	Silver Series	Medievil Man	One in a Million	8
1976	Sonkisser	Gay Jitterbug	Star of the Sea	7
1975	Greek Answer	Fashion Sale	Rich Sun	11
1974	Frankie Adams	Judger (DH)	Training Table (DH)	13
1973	Shecky Greene	Forego	Leo's Pisces	7
