= 1979 Kentucky Derby =

Horse race

105th Kentucky Derby
- Kentucky Derby
- Grade I stakes race
- Location: Churchill Downs
- Date: May 5, 1979
- Distance: 1 1/4 miles
- Winning horse: Spectacular Bid
- Winning time: 2:02.40
- Final odds: .60-1
- Jockey: Ron Franklin
- Trainer: Bud Delp
- Owner: Hawksworth Farm
- Conditions: Three-year-olds
- Surface: Dirt (fast)
- Attendance: 128,488

The 1979 Kentucky Derby was the 105th running of the Kentucky Derby. The race took place on May 5, 1979, on a track rated fast.

== Full results ==
Finished	Post	Horse	Jockey	Trainer	Owner	Time / behind
1st	4	Spectacular Bid	Ron Franklin	Bud Delp	Hawksworth Farm	2:02 2/5
2nd	1	General Assembly	Laffit Pincay Jr.	LeRoy Jolley	Bertram R. Firestone	2 ¾
3rd	2	Golden Act	Sandy Hawley	Loren Rettele	William H. Oldknow & Robert W. Phipps	3
4th	7	King Celebrity	Cash Asmussen	Robert J. Taylor	Che-Bar Stable	1 ¾
5th	8	Flying Paster	Donald Pierce	Gordon C. Campbell	Bernard J. Ridder	2 ½
6th	6	Screen King	Angel Cordero Jr.	Luis Barrera	Flying Zee Stable	3 ½
7th	1A	Sir Ivor Again	Don MacBeth	LeRoy Jolley	Mrs. Tilyou Christopher	3 ¼
8th	5	Shamgo	Frank Olivares	John Sullivan	Rogers Red Top Inc.	1 ¼
9th	9	Lot O' Gold	Donald Brumfield	Smiley Adams	Frederick E. Lehmann	4 ¼
10th	3	Great Redeemer	Richard Depass	James A. Mohamed	Mr. & Mrs. James Mohamed	25

- Winning Breeder: Mrs. William Jason & Mrs. William M. Gilmore; (KY)
