= 1979 Preakness Stakes =

104th running of the Preakness Stakes

104th Preakness Stakes
- The Preakness Stakes
- Location: Pimlico Race Course, Baltimore, Maryland, United States
- Date: May 19, 1979
- Winning horse: Spectacular Bid
- Jockey: Ronnie Franklin
- Conditions: Good
- Surface: Dirt

The 1979 Preakness Stakes was the 104th running of the $235,000 Grade 1 Preakness Stakes thoroughbred horse race. The race took place on May 19, 1979, and was televised in the United States on the ABC television network. Spectacular Bid, who was jockeyed by Ronnie Franklin, won the race by six and one half lengths over runner-up Golden Act. Approximate post time was 5:41 p.m. Eastern Time. The race was run on a track listed as good in a final time of 1:54-1/5. The Maryland Jockey Club reported total attendance of 72,607, this is recorded as second highest on the list of American thoroughbred racing top attended events for North America in 1979.

== Payout ==
The 104th Preakness Stakes Payout Schedule

Program Number	Horse Name	Win	Place	Show
2	Spectacular Bid	US$2.20	$2.20	-
3	Golden Act	-	$5.60	-
4	Screen King	-	-	-

$2 Exacta: (2–3) paid $15.80

== The full chart ==
Finish Position	Margin (lengths)	Post Position	Horse name	Jockey	Trainer	Owner	Post Time Odds	Purse Earnings
1st	0	2	Spectacular Bid	Ron Franklin	Grover Delp	Hawksworth Farm	0.10-1 favorite	$165,300
2nd	61/2	3	Golden Act	Sandy Hawley	Loren Rettele	William H. Oldknow & Robert W. Phipps	27.20-1	$40,000
3rd	101/2	4	Screen King	Ángel Cordero Jr.	Luis S. Barrera	Flying Zee Stable	22.80-1	$20,000
4th	12	1	Flying Paster	Don Pierce	Gordon C. Campbell	Bernard J. Ridder	9.90-1	$10,000
5th	121/2	5	General Assembly	Laffit Pincay Jr.	LeRoy Jolley	Bertrum R. Firestone	7.90-1	

- Winning Breeder: Gilmore & Jason Mimes; (KY)
- Winning Time: 1:54 1/5
- Track Condition: Good
- Total Attendance: 72,607
