= Hutcheson Stakes =

Horse race in Florida, U.S.

- Class: Listed
- Location: Gulfstream Park; Hallandale Beach, Florida
- Inaugurated: 1954
- Race type: Thoroughbred – Flat racing
- Website: www.gulfstreampark.com

Race information
- Distance: 6 furlongs
- Surface: Dirt
- Track: left-handed
- Qualification: Three-year-olds
- Weight: Assigned
- Purse: $75,000

The Hutcheson Stakes is an American Thoroughbred horse race held annually at Gulfstream Park in Hallandale Beach, Florida. An event raced on dirt, it is open to three-year-old horses.

== Historical notes ==
Inaugurated on March 31, 1954, the Hutcheson Stakes was named in honor of labor leader William Levi Hutcheson (1874–1953) who served as a member of the Gulfstream Park Advisory Board. It has been one of several prep races for the Grade 1 Florida Derby.

Spectacular Bid captured the Hutcheson on his way to winning the 1979 Kentucky Derby as did Swale in 1984. Another notable winner of this race was Holy Bull who won the event in his first start of 1994 then went on to earn 1994 American Horse of the Year honors. Like Spectacular Bid, Holy Bull was voted into the National Museum of Racing and Hall of Fame.

On February 11, 2012, Starlight Racing's Thunder Moccasin won the Grade 2 Hutcheson Stakes. For trainer Todd Pletcher, it marked his seventh win of this event and for jockey John Velazquez it was his sixth. Both are records that still stand through 2020.

== Records ==
Speed record:

- 1:09.57 @ current distance of 6 furlongs: Awesome Banner (2016)
- 1:20.80 @ 7 furlongs: Shecky Greene (1973) & Sensitive Prince (1978)

Most wins by an owner:

- 2 - Michael Tabor (2001, 2003)
- 2 - Meadow Stable (1958, 1965)

Most wins by a jockey:

- 6 - John Velazquez (2000, 2003, 2004, 2005, 2006, 2012)

Most wins by a trainer:

- 7 - Todd A. Pletcher (2000, 2003, 2004, 2005, 2006, 2007, 2012)

== Winners ==
Year	Winner	Age	Jockey	Trainer	Owner	Dist. (furlongs)	Time	Win $	Gr.
2020	With Verve	3	Edgar Prado	Larry Bates	Eric J. Wirth	6 f	1:11.44	$61,380	L/R
2019	Gladiator King	3	Leonel Reyes	Jaime Mejia	Thoroughbred Champions Training Center	6 f	1:10.88	$62,000	G3
2018	Madison's Luna	3	Julien Leparoux	Philip A. Bauer	Rigney Racing	6 f	1:10.45	$61,380	G3
2017	Race not held								
2016	Awesome Banner	3	Jose C. Caraballo	Stanley I. Gold	Jacks or Better Farm	6 f	1:09.57	$60,760	G3
2015	Barbados	3	Luis Saez	Michael A. Tomlinson	Suzanne Stables (Paul Hanifl)	7 f	1:24.39	$92,070	G3
2014	Wildcat Red	3	Javier Castellano	Jose Garoffalo	Honors Stable Corp. (Salvatore Delfino & Josie Martino)	7 f	1:22.21	$135,000	G3
2013	Honorable Dillon	3	Joseph Rocco Jr.	Eddie Kenneally	Joseph Bucci	7 f	1:22.53	$90,000	G2
2012	Thunder Moccasin	3	John R. Velazquez	Todd A. Pletcher	Starlight Racing (Jack & Laurie Wolf, partnership managers)	7 f	1:24.16	$90,000	G2
2011	Flashpoint	3	Cornelio Velásquez	Richard E. Dutrow Jr.	Peachtree Stable (John P. Fort)	7 f	1:22.03	$90,000	G2
2010	D' Funnybone	3	Edgar Prado	Richard E. Dutrow Jr.	Paul Pompa Jr.	7 f	1:22.14	$90,000	G2
2009	Capt. Candyman Can	3	Julien Leparoux	Ian Wilkes	Joseph Rauch & David Zell	7 f	1:23.96	$90,000	G2
2008	Smooth Air	3	Manoel Cruz	Bennie Stutts Jr.	Mount Joy Stables (Brian & Jan Burns)	7 f	1:23.21	$90,000	G2
2007	King of the Roxy	3	Edgar Prado	Todd A. Pletcher	Team Valor	7.5 f	1:28.00	$90,000	G2
2006	Keyed Entry	3	John R. Velazquez	Todd A. Pletcher	Starlight Stables et al.	7.5 f	1:27.12	$90,000	G2
2005	Proud Accolade	3	John R. Velazquez	Todd A. Pletcher	Padua Stables	7.5 f	1:29.90	$90,000	G2
2004	Limehouse	3	John R. Velazquez	Todd A. Pletcher	Dogwood Stable	7 f	1:22.23	$90,000	G2
2003	Lion Tamer	3	John R. Velazquez	Todd A. Pletcher	Michael Tabor	7 f	1:22.60	$90,000	G2
2002	Showmeitall	3	Jorge Chavez	Manny Tortora	Take Five Stables	7 f	1:26.07	$90,000	G2
2001	Yonaguska	3	Jerry D. Bailey	D. Wayne Lukas	Michael Tabor	7 f	1:22.63	$90,000	G2
2000	More Than Ready (DH)	3	John R. Velazquez	Todd A. Pletcher	James T. Scatuorchio	7 f	1:21.76	$60,000	G2
2000	Summer Note (DH)	3	Shane Sellers	Randy Morse	Greg Besinger	7 f	1:21.76	$60,000	G2
1999	Bet Me Best	3	Jerry D. Bailey	W. Elliott Walden	Prestonwood Farm	7 f	1:22.33	$90,000	G2
1998	Time Limit	3	Jerry D. Bailey	D. Wayne Lukas	Overbrook Farm	7 f	1:22.53	$60,000	G2
1997	Frisk Me Now	3	Edwin L. King Jr.	Robert J. Durso	Carol R. Dender	7 f	1:22.51	$60,000	G2
1996	Appealing Skier	3	Rick Wilson	Benjamin W. Perkins Sr.	New Farm	7 f	1:24.72	$45,000	G2
1995	Valid Wager	3	Martin A. Pedroza	Michael Mollica	Bob & Beverly Lewis	7 f	1:23.51	$45,000	G2
1994	Holy Bull	3	Mike E. Smith	Warren A. Croll, Jr.	Warren A. Croll, Jr.	7 f	1:21.23	$45,000	G2
1993	Hidden Trick	3	Randy Romero	Jacqueline Brittain	Elaine Wold	7 f	1:23.61	$54,108	G2
1992	My Luck Runs North	3	Ricardo D. Lopez	Angel M. Medina	Melvin A. Benitez	7 f	1:24.95	$55,008	G2
1991	Fly So Free	3	Jose A. Santos	Scotty Schulhofer	Tommy & Elizabeth Valando	7 f	1:23.30	$55,527	G2
1990	Housebuster	3	Randy Romero	Warren A. Croll, Jr.	Robert P. Levy	7 f	1:24.40	$56,787	G3
1989	Dixieland Brass	3	Randy Romero	Charles Peoples	Bayard Sharp & William S. Farish IV	7 f	1:22.80	$58,320	G3
1988	Perfect Spy	3	Jean-Luc Samyn	Stanley Shapoff	Robert B. Cohen	7 f	1:23.00	$52,335	G3
1987	Well Selected	3	Jacinto Vasquez	Eugene Jacobs	Herbert Allen	7 f	1:23.00	$53,376	G3
1986	Papal Power	3	Don MacBeth	Charles Peoples	Bayard Sharp	7 f	1:23.80	$55,440	G3
1985	Banner Bob	3	Keith K. Allen	Jerry J. Sarner Jr.	Sharon E. & William J. Walsh	7 f	1:21.60	$45,720	G3
1984	Swale	3	Eddie Maple	Woody Stephens	Claiborne Farm	7 f	1:22.20	$38,790	G3
1983	Current Hope	3	Alex Solis	Roger Laurin	Howard Kaskel & Robert Baker	7 f	1:22.80	$49,330	G3
1982	Distinctive Pro	3	Jorge Velasquez	Warren A. Croll Jr.	Howard Kaskel & Aisco Stable	7 f	1:22.40	$34,640	G3
1981	Lord Avie	3	Chris McCarron	Daniel Perlsweig	SKS Stable	7 f	1:23.40	$34,080	
1980	Plugged Nickle	3	Buck Thornburg	Thomas J. Kelly	John M. Schiff	7 f	1:22.60	$17,640	
1979	Spectacular Bid	3	Ron Franklin	Bud Delp	Hawksworth Farm	7 f	1:21.20	$17,766	
1978	Sensitive Prince	3	Mickey Solomone	H. Allen Jerkens	Joseph Taub & Dennis Milne	7 f	1:20.80	$19,890	
1977	Silver Series	3	Larry Snyder	Oscar Dishman	Archie Donaldson	7 f	1:22.80	$20,610	
1976	Sonkisser	3	Braulio Baeza	Stephen A. DiMauro	Harold Snyder	7 f	1:21.00	$19,350	
1975	Greek Answer	3	Marco Castaneda	Frank H. Merrill Jr.	W. Preston Gilbride	7 f	1:21.60	$20,370	
1974	Frankie Adams	3	Ron Turcotte	Tommy Gullo	Green Mill Farm	7 f	1:22.40	$21,845	
1973	Shecky Greene	3	Braulio Baeza	Louis M. Goldfine	Joseph Kellman	7 f	1:20.80	$19,170	
1972	Spanish Riddle	3	Frank Iannelli	Lucien Laurin	Roy E. Anderson	7 f	1:22.80	$29,820	
1971	Landing More	3	Robert Woodhouse	Paul Bongarzone	Solar Farm	7 f	1:21.80	$20,910	
1970	Cassie Red	3	Walter Blum	Robert S. DuBois	Charles Windle	7 f	1:22.60	$22,950	
1969	Al Hattab	3	Ray Broussard	Warren A. Croll Jr.	Pelican Stable (Rachel Carpenter)	7 f	1:22.60	$15,000	
1968	Pappa Steve	3	Bobby Ussery	Homer C. Pardue	Steven Wilson	7 f	1:22.80	$15,175	
1967	Glengary	3	John Giovanni	Charles P. Sanborn	Joan M. Sutcliffe & Millard Cox	7 f	1:23.20	$15,025	
1966	Bold and Brave	3	Kenny Knapp	James E. Fitzsimmons	Wheatley Stable	7 f	1:22.80	$11,625	
1965	Gallant Lad	3	Braulio Baeza	Casey Hayes	Meadow Stable	7 f	1:23.80	$10,700	
1964	Kentucky Pioneer	3	Larry Adams	Jimmy Jones	Calumet Farm	7 f	1:24.00	$10,900	
1963	Sky Wonder	3	Bobby Ussery	Budd I. Lepman	Mrs. Charles D. Morgan	7 f	1:23.40	$8,375	
1962	Eidolon	3	Larry Adams	Budd I. Lepman	Alfredo Stable (Alfred Muller)	7 f	1:24.80	$8,425	
1961	Nashua Blue	3	Bobby Ussery	Lloyd Murray	Boncrist Farm (Christopher J. Devine)	7 f	1:23.00	$7,750	
1960	Will Ye	3	Sam Boulmetis	Del W. Carroll	George H. Willis	6.5 f	1:16.20	$7,950	
1959	Easy Spur	3	Logan Batcheller	Paul L. Kelley	Spring Hill Farm	6.5 f	1:15.00	$7,750	
1958	Yemen	3	Bobby Ussery	Casey Hayes	Meadow Stable	6.5 f	1:15.80	$7,425	
1957	Jet Colonel	3	Bobby Ussery	Frank Sanders	Reverie Knoll Farm (Freeman Keyes)	6.5 f	1:16.00	$8,000	
1956	Decathlon	3	Gene R. Martin	Rollie T. Shepp	River Divide Farm (Robert J. Dienst)	6.5 f	1:16.00	$8,000	
1955	Nance's Lad	3	John Choquette	Hilton A. Dabson	Hilton A. Dabson & Chester J. Caithness	6.5 f	1:16.40	$9,400	
1954	Buttevant	3	Kenneth Church	George P. "Maje" Odom	John Barry Ryan	6 f	1:10.80	$4,875	

== See also ==
- Hutcheson Stakes top three finishers and starters
