= Daniel Perlsweig =

American jockey and horse trainer (1926–2018)

Personal information
- Born: May 21, 1926 West Philadelphia, Pennsylvania; United States
- Died: February 27, 2018 (aged 91) Mount Laurel, New Jersey, United States
- Occupations: Jockey, Trainer

Horse racing career
- Sport: Horse racing
- Career wins: Not found

Major racing wins
- As a trainer: Pennsylvania Governor's Cup Handicap (1973, 1974); Salvator Mile Handicap (1975); Juvenile Stakes (1980); Young America Stakes (1980); Cowdin Stakes (1980); Champagne Stakes (1980); Hutcheson Stakes (1981); Florida Derby (1981); Morven Stakes (1984); Red Bank Stakes (1989); Fort Marcy Handicap (1989)

Racing awards
- Raines Distinguished Achievement Award (1997); Dogwood Dominion Award (1999)

Significant horses
- Lord Avie, Mongongo

Daniel Perlsweig (May 21, 1926 – February 27, 2018) was an American jockey and trainer in the sport of Thoroughbred horse racing.

== Background ==
Daniel Perlsweig served with the United States Navy in World War II including time aboard the USS Tucson. When the war ended he embarked on what would be a ten-year career as jockey after which he turned to training Thoroughbreds.

Among his successful horses, Perlsweig is best known for training Lord Avie, the 1980 American Champion Two-Year-Old Colt. Lord Avie won the 1981 Florida Derby and was favored to win the 1981 Kentucky Derby until an injury kept him out of all three of the U. S. Triple Crown series.

In the early 1990s, Perlsweig founded Backstretch Appreciation Day to honor the many stable hands who work tirelessly behind the scene to look after horses, helping to secure their continuing success in racing.

In 1999, Perlsweig was voted the Dogwood Dominion Award as one of the unsung heroes of American horse racing.
