= Ron Franklin (jockey) =

American jockey (1959–2018)

Personal information
- Full name: Ronald Franklin
- Born: December 20, 1959 Baltimore, Maryland
- Died: March 8, 2018 (aged 58) Baltimore, Maryland
- Occupation: Jockey

Horse racing career
- Sport: Horse racing
- Career wins: 1,403

Major racing wins
- Heritage Stakes (1978); Laurel Futurity Stakes (1978); World's Playground Stakes (1978, 1979); J. Edgar Hoover Handicap (1978, 1979, 1980, 1986, 1988); Blue Grass Stakes (1979); Flamingo Stakes (1979); Florida Derby (1979); Fountain of Youth Stakes (1979); Hutcheson Stakes (1979); Cotillion Stakes (1981); Omaha Gold Cup (1983); Ak-Sar-Ben Board of Governors' Handicap (1983); Fair Grounds Oaks (1985); Riggs Handicap (1986) U.S. Triple Crown series: Kentucky Derby (1979); Preakness Stakes (1979)

Racing awards
- Eclipse Award for Outstanding Apprentice Jockey (1978)

Significant horses
- Spectacular Bid

Ronald Franklin (December 20, 1959 – March 8, 2018) was an American jockey. At the age of only nineteen, he rode the champion racehorse Spectacular Bid to win the Kentucky Derby and the Preakness Stakes.

== Early life ==
Franklin was born in Baltimore, Maryland and grew up in nearby Dundalk where he was the youngest of six children. He attended Patapsco High School where he briefly played on the school's baseball team. Because he was so small in stature (4 foot 7 inches or 1.40 m tall and weighed 72 pounds), the coach would insert him into the line-up, hoping to draw a base on balls. Franklin had to put up with pushing and shoving and jokes about his size, but he fought back and learned to be tough.

Franklin dropped out of high school when he was 16 years old. He didn't know what he was going to do with his life, but then his neighbor Hank Tiburzi saw him wrestling with some other boys. Tiburzi thought that Franklin could be a jockey with strength like that. He took Franklin to the local Pimlico Race Course in 1976, and Franklin was immediately hooked. He asked the stables hands about employment, and after a few minutes, the public address system announced, “There’s a young man at the stable gate looking for a hot walker’s job.” Franklin didn't even know what a hot walker did. The trainer Bud Delp heard the announcement and hired Franklin to be a hotwalker for $75 a week. With Bud Delp, Franklin learned about everything in the racing business. He mucked out stables, walked horses, and did other odd jobs around the track. Franklin then became an exercise rider, and then went to a training center in Middleburg, Virginia, where he learned to ride yearlings.

== Career ==
On February 4, 1978, Franklin won the first race he rode in. He was aboard a horse called Pioneer Patty at Bowie Race Track in Maryland. Franklin's second career win was aboard Deficit. In his first year of racing, Franklin won the Eclipse Award for Outstanding Apprentice Jockey.

In 1979, at the age of 19, Franklin rode the champion horse Spectacular Bid to win the Kentucky Derby, the colt's 11th consecutive win. Two weeks later, Franklin and Spectacular Bid won the Preakness Stakes and became the favorite to win the Triple Crown.

However, things were not going so well for Franklin, as his temper was coming back, something that had been a problem since his childhood. On May 22, three days after the Preakness, he was fined $100 for whipping a horse called Big Vision on the head and kicking him in the belly after coming fifth in a race at Pimlico. Richard Delp, Bud Delp's brother, came to Franklin's defense. “I didn’t see the incident, but I know that the horse gave Ronnie a rough trip the whole race. Ronnie was real mad, he just lost his temper. I never knew him to be that way with any horse before," he said. For a person who loved horses so much, it seemed out of character for Franklin to abuse one. “I’m sorry I hit him with the whip. I know I did wrong," he later apologized.

Two weeks after the Preakness Stakes, Franklin and Spectacular Bid were off to the Belmont Stakes at Belmont Park in New York. A win there would catapult both to thoroughbred racing's highest honor: the Triple Crown; and would see the third Triple Crown winner in succession. Spectacular Bid, however, finished third behind Coastal and Golden Act. In the mile-and-a-half race Spectacular Bid made his move too early, and tired noticeably in the stretch. Franklin was blamed for the loss, most notably by the horse's trainer, Bud Delp. However, the cause of Spectacular Bid's loss was actually a safety pin he had stepped on in the days before the race, which hurt his hoof.

After the Belmont Stakes, Franklin was taken off Spectacular Bid and replaced by Hall of Fame jockey Bill Shoemaker. Things went downhill quickly for Franklin after that. Only nine days after the Belmont Stakes, he was arrested for possession of cocaine outside of Disneyland in Anaheim, California. He had drug problems for the rest of his career, and was repeatedly denied his jockey's license from state commissions because of his drug problems.He was eventually diagnosed with lung cancer. In 2017, he moved to Baltimore to receive further cancer treatment and retired from race riding.

Franklin won 1,403 of his 9,242 races between 1978 and 1992, and won purses of more than $14 million. Among his other successes, Franklin won the J. Edgar Hoover Handicap a record five times.

== Death ==
Franklin died of lung cancer in Baltimore on March 8, 2018, at the age of 58.
