= Swale Stakes =

- Class: Listed
- Location: Gulfstream Park; Hallandale Beach, Florida, United States
- Inaugurated: 1985
- Race type: Thoroughbred – Flat racing
- Sponsor: Claiborne Farm (2021)
- Website: www.gulfstreampark.com

Race information
- Distance: 7 furlong sprint
- Surface: Dirt
- Track: Left-handed
- Qualification: Three-year-olds
- Weight: 123 lbs with allowances
- Purse: $175,000 (since 2026)

The Swale Stakes is a Listed American Thoroughbred horse race for three year old horses at the distance of seven furlongs on the dirt held annually in January at Gulfstream Park, Hallandale Beach, Florida. The event currently carries a purse of $175,000.

== History ==
The race was named in honor of Claiborne Farm's brilliant colt Swale who won the 1984 Florida Derby, Kentucky Derby and the Belmont Stakes but who died suddenly of a heart attack eight days after his Belmont victory. In 2021 Claiborne Farm are the sponsors of the event.

The inaugural running of the event was on 2 March 1985 as the tenth race on the Florida Derby racecard over a distance of seven furlongs. The event was won by the 1984 United States Champion 2-year-old colt, Chief's Crown who was resuming after his Breeders' Cup Juvenile victory at Hollywood Park Racetrack victory easily dispatched the field winning by 3 1/4 lengths as the 3/10 odds-on favorite.

The event was not held in 1987.

In 1990 the event was upgraded to a Grade III and once again to Grade II in 2006.

For two runnings of the event, in 2007 and 2008 the race was run over the shorter 6 1/2 furlongs distance.

In 2009, Big Drama set a new stakes and track record of 1:20.88 but was disqualified and placed second with the race awarded to This Ones for Phil.

This race was upgraded once again to a Grade II for its 2014 running but then downgraded again to Grade III in 2018.

In 2024 the event was downgraded by the Thoroughbred Owners and Breeders Association to Listed status

== Records ==
Speed record:

- 7 furlongs – 1:20.88 (Note: The winning time of 1:20.88 was actually set by Big Drama, who was disqualified to second place for interference) This Ones For Phil (2009)
- 6 1/2 furlongs – 1:15.06 Eaton's Gift (2008)

Margins:

- 10 1/2 lengths – D'wildcat (2001)

Most wins by a jockey:

- 5 – Luis Saez (2013, 2015, 2018, 2022, 2023)

Most wins by a trainer:

- 4 – Claude R. McGaughey III (1988, 1989, 1996, 2023)
- 4 – Todd A. Pletcher (2000, 2011, 2022, 2025)

Most wins by an owner:

- 2 – Ogden Phipps (1988, 1989)
- 2 – Dogwood Stable (1994, 2000)
- 2 – Paul P. Pompa Jr. (2009, 2010)
- 2 – Michael Dubb (2009, 2019)
- 2 – Courtlandt Farms (2018, 2023)

== Winners ==
Year	Winner	Jockey	Trainer	Owner	Distance	Time	Purse	Grade	Ref
2026	Solitude Dude	Irad Ortiz Jr.	Saffie Joseph Jr.	Chris Fountoukis	7 furlongs	1:23.46	$175,000	Listed	
2025	Gate to Wire	Dylan Davis	Todd A. Pletcher	Donegal Racing	7 furlongs	1:22.51	$165,000	Listed	
2024	Frankie's Empire	Miguel Vasquez	Michael Yates	Frank DeLuca	7 furlongs	1:24.22	$125,000	Listed	
2023	General Jim	Luis Saez	Claude R. McGaughey III	Courtlandt Farms	7 furlongs	1:23.34	$125,000	III	
2022	My Prankster	Luis Saez	Todd A. Pletcher	Lawana L. & Robert E. Low	7 furlongs	1:23.13	$100,000	III	
2021	Drain the Clock	Edgard Zayas	Saffie Joseph Jr.	Slam Dunk Racing, Madaket Stables, Wonder Stables & Michael Nentwig	7 furlongs	1:23.29	$100,000	III	
2020	Mischevious Alex	Irad Ortiz Jr.	John C. Servis	Cash is King & LC Racing	7 furlongs	1:22.83	$150,000	III	
2019	Call Paul	Irad Ortiz Jr.	Jason Servis	Michael Dubb, David Simon, Bethlehem Stables & Bruce Irom	7 furlongs	1:23.43	$150,000	III	
2018	Strike Power	Luis Saez	Mark A. Hennig	Courtlandt Farm	7 furlongs	1:22.68	$200,000	III	
2017	Favorable Outcome	Javier Castellano	Chad C. Brown	Klaravich Stables & William H. Lawrence	7 furlongs	1:23.03	$200,000	II	
2016	Awesome Banner	Jose C. Caraballo	Stanley I. Gold	Jacks or Better Farm	7 furlongs	1:21.81	$200,000	II	
2015	Ready for Rye	Luis Saez	Thomas Albertrani	Chalk Racing	7 furlongs	1:22.39	$200,000	II	
2014	Spot	Jose Lezcano	Nicholas P. Zito	Joseph H. Moss	7 furlongs	1:22.44	$200,000	II	
2013	Clearly Now	Luis Saez	Brian A. Lynch	Up Hill Stable	7 furlongs	1:23.19	$150,000	III	
2012	Trinniberg	Willie Martinez	Bisnath Parboo	Shivananda Parbhoo	7 furlongs	1:21.69	$150,000	III	
2011	Travelin Man	John R. Velazquez	Todd A. Pletcher	E. Paul Robsham Stables	7 furlongs	1:21.94	$147,000	II	
2010	D' Funnybone	Edgar S. Prado	Richard E. Dutrow Jr.	Paul P. Pompa Jr.	7 furlongs	1:21.98	$150,000	II	
2009	† This Ones for Phil	Garrett K. Gomez	Richard E. Dutrow Jr.	Paul P. Pompa Jr., Jack Mandato & Michael Dubb	7 furlongs	1:20.88	$150,000	II	
2008	Eaton's Gift	Kent J. Desormeaux	Dale L. Romans	Zayat Stables	6 1/2 furlongs	1:15.63	$150,000	II	
2007	Adore the Gold	Cornelio Velasquez	Michael E. Gorham	John D. Murphy Sr.	6 1/2 furlongs	1:15.86	$150,000	II	
2006	Sharp Humor	Mark Guidry	Dale L. Romans	Purdedel Stable	7 furlongs	1:22.14	$150,000	II	
2005	Lost in the Fog	Russell Baze	Greg Gilchrist	Harry J. Aleo	7 furlongs	1:22.21	$150,000	II	
2004	Wynn Dot Comma	Edgar S. Prado	Martin D. Wolfson	Martin Cherry	7 furlongs	1:22.87	$150,000	III	
2003	Midas Eyes	Jerry D. Bailey	Robert J. Frankel	Edmund A. Gann	7 furlongs	1:21.06	$150,000	III	
2002	Ethan Man	Pat Day	Patrick B. Byrne	West Point Thoroughbreds	7 furlongs	1:22.29	$150,000	III	
2001	D'wildcat	Corey Nakatani	Robert B. Hess Jr.	Fog City Stable	7 furlongs	1:22.25	$150,000	III	
2000	Trippi	Jerry D. Bailey	Todd A. Pletcher	Dogwood Stable	7 furlongs	1:23.43	$100,000	III	
1999	Yes It's True	Jerry D. Bailey	D. Wayne Lukas	Padua Stables	7 furlongs	1:22.29	$100,000	III	
1998	Favorite Trick	Pat Day	William I. Mott	Joseph P. LaCombe	7 furlongs	1:22.86	$100,000	III	
1997	Confide	Mike E. Smith	Ben W. Perkins Sr.	New Farm	7 furlongs	1:23.35	$75,000	III	
1996	Roar	Mike E. Smith	Claude R. McGaughey III	Claiborne Farm & Adele Dilschneider	7 furlongs	1:22.46	$75,000	III	
1995	Mr. Greeley	Julie Krone	Nicholas P. Zito	William J. Condren & Joseph Cornacchia	7 furlongs	1:22.18	$75,000	III	
1994	Arrival Time	Chris McCarron	Frank A. Alexander	Dogwood Stable	7 furlongs	1:22.53	$75,000	III	
1993	Premier Explosion	Dave Penna	David R. Bell	John Franks	7 furlongs	1:23.23	$89,200	III	
1992	D. J. Cat	Jerry D. Bailey	Happy Alter	Bea Oxenberg & Atler's Racing Stable	7 furlongs	1:23.39	$118,750	III	
1991	Chihuahua	Jose O. Alferez	Mario Martinez Jr.	Mar-deb-ron Farms	7 furlongs	1:23.47	$75,000	III	
1990	Housebuster	Craig Perret	Jimmy Croll	Robert P. Levy	7 furlongs	1:22.20	$57,250	III	
1989	Easy Goer	Pat Day	Claude R. McGaughey III	Ogden Phipps	7 furlongs	1:22.20	$57,150		
1988	Seeking the Gold	Randy Romero	Claude R. McGaughey III	Ogden Phipps	7 furlongs	1:21.60	$58,500		
1987	Race not held								
1986	One Magic Moment	Craig Perret	Joseph H. Pierce Jr.	Sheila Pierce & H. Kligman	7 furlongs	1:25.40	$52,250		
1985	Chief's Crown	Donald MacBeth	Roger Laurin	Star Crown Stable	7 furlongs	1:22.40	$51,320		

Notes:
† In the 2009 Big Drama was first past the post but was disqualified for bumping This Ones for Phil twice in the straight thus This Ones for Phil was declared the winner.

== See also ==
List of American and Canadian Graded races
