= Play On =

Play On may refer to:

- Play On (horse), an American Thoroughbred racehorse
- Play On (John Miles album), a 1983 album by John Miles
- Play On (Carrie Underwood album), a 2009 album by Carrie Underwood
- "Play On", a track from the album Starting Over by The Raspberries
- "Play On", a track from the album A World Next Door to Yours by The Parlotones
- "Play On", a track from the album Do You Want the Truth or Something Beautiful? by Paloma Faith
- Play On!, a Broadway musical based on the music of Duke Ellington
- PlayOn, a PC-based browser and media server
- Played on, a method of dismissal in cricket, an informal sub-type of bowled
