= 1984 Kentucky Derby =

Horse race

110th Kentucky Derby
- Kentucky Derby
- Grade I stakes race
- Location: Churchill Downs
- Date: May 5, 1984
- Winning horse: Swale
- Jockey: Laffit Pincay Jr.
- Trainer: Woody Stephens
- Owner: Claiborne Farm
- Conditions: Fast
- Surface: Dirt
- Attendance: 126,453

The 1984 Kentucky Derby was the 110th running of the Kentucky Derby. The race took place on May 5, 1984, with 126,453 people in attendance. The race was won by Swale, who went on to finish out of the money in the Preakness, then won the Belmont.

== Full results ==
Finished	Post	Horse	Jockey	Trainer	Owner	Time / behind
1st	10	Swale	Laffit Pincay Jr.	Woody Stephens	Claiborne Farm	2:02 2/5
2nd	18	Coax Me Chad	Herb McCauley	Ronnie Warren	Elmer Miller	
3rd	9	At The Threshold	Eddie Maple	Lynn S. Whiting	W. Cal Partee	
4th	6	Fali Time	Sandy Hawley	Gary F. Jones	Kenneth Opstein	
5th	11	Gate Dancer (Note: Gate Dancer finished 4th, but was subsequently disqualified and placed 5th, due to interfering with Fali Time.)	Eddie Delahoussaye	Jack Van Berg	Mamakos & Stubrin	
6th	2b	Pine Circle	Mike E. Smith	Claude R. McGaughey III	Loblolly Stable	
7th	5	Fight Over	Octavio Vergara	John Parisella	Sabarese-Bwamazon Farm	
8th	1a	Life's Magic	Donald Brumfield	D. Wayne Lukas	Hatley Racing Stable	
9th	8	Silent King	Bill Shoemaker	Bud Delp	Hawksworth Farm	
10th	14	Rexson's Hope	Robert Gaffglione	Harold J. Rose	Elsie A. Rose	
11th	12	So Vague	Patricia Cooksey	Gerald M. Russell	Hyperion Thoroughbreds Ltd.	
12th	17	Biloxi Indian	Garth Patterson	Dianne Carpenter	Dianne Carpenter	
13th	7	Taylor's Special	Sam Maple	William I. Mott	William F. Lucas	
14th	3	Raja's Shark	Rick Wilson	Salvatore Campo	Irwin Feiner	
15th	13	Bedouin	Ray Sibille	Richard E. Mandella	Elmendorf Farm	
16th	2	Vanlandingham	Pat Day	Claude R. McGaughey III	Loblolly Stable	
17th	15	Secret Prince	Craig Perret	William V. Terrill	Elaine Brodsky	
18th	4	Bear Hunt	Don MacBeth	Roger Laurin	Taylor's Purchase Farm	
19th	1	Althea	Chris McCarron	D. Wayne Lukas	Alexander & Aykroyd & Groves	
20th	16	Majestic Shore	John L. Lively	Loren Rettele	William Oldknow & Robert Phipps	

- Winning breeder: Claiborne Farm (KY)
