= Slew o' Gold =

American-bred Thoroughbred racehorse

- Sire: Seattle Slew
- Grandsire: Bold Reasoning
- Dam: Alluvial
- Damsire: Buckpasser
- Sex: Stallion
- Foaled: 1980
- Country: United States
- Color: Bay
- Breeder: Claiborne Farm
- Owner: Equusequity Stable
- Trainer: Sidney Watters Jr. John O. Hertler
- Record: 21: 12-5-1
- Earnings: $3,533,534

Major wins
- Wood Memorial Stakes (1983); Peter Pan Stakes (1983); Woodward Stakes (1983, 1984); Jockey Club Gold Cup (1983, 1984); Whitney Handicap (1984); Marlboro Cup (1984)

Awards
- U.S. Three Year-old Male Champion (1983); U.S. Older Male Champion (1984)

Honors
- U.S. Racing Hall of Fame (1992) #58 - Top 100 U.S. Racehorses of the 20th Century
- Last updated on September 17, 2006

Slew o' Gold (April 19, 1980 – October 14, 2007) was an American thoroughbred racehorse who was voted the 1983 Eclipse Award for Outstanding Three-Year-Old Male Horse and the 1984 Eclipse Award for Outstanding Older Male Horse.

== Background ==
Bred by Kentucky's renowned Claiborne Farm, he was owned and raced by Equusequity Stable, a partnership of Dr. Jim and Sally Hill and Mickey and Karen Taylor, who owned Oak Crest Farm in Marion County, Florida. Slew o' Gold was a half brother to the stakes winning Coastal.

== Racing career ==
As a 2-year-old, Slew o' Gold ran in only three races, winning two. In the 1983 American Triple Crown races, Slew o' Gold finished 4th in the Kentucky Derby, did not run in the Preakness Stakes, and finished second in the Belmont Stakes. In the fall of 1983, Slew o' Gold blossomed as a top racehorse by defeating top older horses in the Woodward Stakes and the Jockey Club Gold Cup, while finishing a close second in the Marlboro Cup, narrowly missing a sweep of the 1983 Fall Championship Series at Belmont.

Racing as a 4-year-old in 1984, Slew o' Gold did not make his first start until July 2 due to problems with his hooves, but won four major races, including the Whitney Handicap at Saratoga and a sweep of the 1984 Fall Championship Series or Fall Triple Crown - the Marlboro Cup, Woodward Stakes and Jockey Club Gold Cup (mile and a half) at Belmont Park that earned him a $1,000,000 bonus. In his final start of 1984 and of his career, which was the first running of the Breeders' Cup Classic, the race produced an exciting finish between 30–1 longshot Wild Again on the inside, Gate Dancer on the outside and favorite Slew o' Gold in between. The three battled down the stretch with Wild Again bearing out and shifting his path away from the rail and Gate Dancer "lugging in" towards the rail, squeezing out Slew O' Gold. Wild Again finished a head in front of Gate Dancer with Slew o' Gold less than a length behind. After a 10-minute stewards' inquiry and controversial decision, Wild Again was left in first place but Gate Dancer was disqualified to third, and Slew o' Gold placed second.

== Stud record ==
After the Breeders' Cup, Slew o' Gold was retired to stand at stud at Three Chimneys Farm near Midway, Kentucky. He sired the Grade I winners Awe Inspiring, Golden Opinion, Dramatic Gold, Gorgeous, Thirty Six Red and Tactile, along with stakes winner Nine Carat, who won the 1991 Prix Montenica, a Listed race at Deauville-La Touques Racecourse in France. After 17 years in stud service, in 2002 Slew o' Gold was pensioned.

== Honors ==
In 1992, Slew o' Gold was inducted into the National Museum of Racing and Hall of Fame. In The Blood-Horse magazine ranking of the top 100 U.S. thoroughbred champions of the 20th Century, Slew o' Gold was ranked #58.

== Death ==
Slew o' Gold was euthanized due to the infirmities of old age on October 14, 2007, at the age of 27. He is buried at Three Chimneys Farm.

== Pedigree ==
Pedigree of Slew o' Gold, bay stallion, 1980
Sire Seattle Slew	Bold Reasoning	Boldnesian	Bold Ruler
Sire Seattle Slew	Bold Reasoning	Boldnesian	Alanesian
Sire Seattle Slew	Bold Reasoning	Reason to Earn	Hail To Reason
Sire Seattle Slew	Bold Reasoning	Reason to Earn	Sailing Home
Sire Seattle Slew	My Charmer	Poker	Round Table
Sire Seattle Slew	My Charmer	Poker	Glamour
Sire Seattle Slew	My Charmer	Fair Charmer	Jet Action
Sire Seattle Slew	My Charmer	Fair Charmer	Myrtle Charm
Dam Alluvial	Buckpasser	Tom Fool	Menow
Dam Alluvial	Buckpasser	Tom Fool	Gaga
Dam Alluvial	Buckpasser	Busanda	War Admiral
Dam Alluvial	Buckpasser	Busanda	Businesslike
Dam Alluvial	Bayou	Hill Prince	Princequillo
Dam Alluvial	Bayou	Hill Prince	Hildene
Dam Alluvial	Bayou	Bourtai	Stimulus
Dam Alluvial	Bayou	Bourtai	Escutcheon (family: 9-f)
