= 1984 Preakness Stakes =

109th running of the Preakness Stakes

109th Preakness Stakes
- The Preakness Stakes
- Location: Pimlico Race Course, Baltimore, Maryland, United States
- Date: May 19, 1984
- Winning horse: Gate Dancer
- Jockey: Ángel Cordero Jr.
- Conditions: Fast
- Surface: Dirt

The 1984 Preakness Stakes was the 109th running of the $350,000 Grade 1 Preakness Stakes thoroughbred horse race. The race took place on May 19, 1984, and was televised in the United States on the ABC television network. Gate Dancer, who was jockeyed by Angel Cordero, won the race by one and one half lengths over runner-up Play On. Approximate post time was 5:41 p.m. Eastern Time. The race was run over a fast track in a final time of 1:53-3/5. The Maryland Jockey Club reported total attendance of 80,566, this is recorded as second highest on the list of American thoroughbred racing top attended events for North America in 1984.

== Payout ==
The 110th Preakness Stakes Payout Schedule

Program Number	Horse Name	Win	Place	Show
3	Gate Dancer	US$11.60	$5.00	$4.20
10	Play On	-	$7.20	$5.00
2	Fight Over	–	–	$5.60

$2 Exacta: (3–10) paid $106.60

== The full chart ==
Finish Position	Margin (lengths)	Post Position	Horse name	Jockey	Trainer	Owner	Post Time Odds	Purse Earnings
1st	0	3	Gate Dancer	Ángel Cordero Jr.	Jack Van Berg	Kenneth Opstein	4.80-1	$243,600
2nd	1-1/2	10	Play On	Jean-Luc Samyn	William H. Turner Jr.	Welcome Farm	8.10-1	$50,000
3rd	5	2	Fight Over	Octavio Vergara	John Parisella	Ted M. Sabarese	11.20-1	$30,000
4th	53/4	4	Taylor's Special	Bill Shoemaker	William I. Mott	William F. Lucas	3.70-1	$15,000
5th	63/4	6	Pine Circle	Mike E. Smith	Claude R. McGaughey III	Loblolly Stable	55.80-1	
6th	7	7	Wind Flyer	Declan J. Murphy	Charles L. Dickey	Robert E. Masterson	60.50-1	
7th	71/4	5	Swale	Laffit Pincay Jr.	Woody Stephens	Claiborne Farm	0.80-1 favorite	
8th	71/2	8	Raja's Shark	Rick Wilson	Salvatore Campo	Irwin Feiner	54.40-1	
9th	10	1	Pac Soldier	Dave Byrnes	J. William Boniface	First Edition Stable	39.00-1	
10th	101/4	9	S. S. Hot Sause	Donnie A. Miller Jr.	Jack Kousin	Alan S. Kline	34.10-1	

- Winning Breeder: William R. Davis; (FL)
- Winning Time: 1:53 3/5
- Track Condition: Fast
- Total Attendance: 81,235
