= Play On (horse) =

American-bred Thoroughbred racehorse

- Sire: Stop the Music
- Grandsire: Hail To Reason
- Dam: Little Tobago
- Damsire: Impressive
- Sex: Stallion
- Foaled: 1981
- Country: United States
- Colour: Dark Brown
- Breeder: Hillbrook Farm
- Owner: Welcome Farm
- Trainer: William H. Turner, Jr.
- Record: 6: 2-3-0
- Earnings: US$167,762

Major wins
- Withers Stakes (1984) American Classic Race placing: Preakness Stakes 2nd (1984)

Play On (born in 1981) was an American Thoroughbred racehorse who was the son of Stop the Music and grandson to Hail to Reason. He is best remembered for winning the 1984 Withers Stakes and placing second three weeks later in the $400,000 Grade 1 Preakness Stakes to Gate Dancer.

== Racing career ==
Play On competed in six races over seven months in 1984 as a three-year-old. He broke his maiden at Aqueduct Racetrack in his second attempt and followed that up with a second in allowance company. In his fourth lifetime start, his connections decided to take a big step up in class and entered him in a graded stakes race: the one-turn, one-mile Withers Stakes, which he won in 1:36.40 under jockey Jean-Luc Samyn at Aqueduct Racetrack.

Three weeks later, his trainer took a shot at the second jewel of the Triple Crown. The Preakness Stakes is run at a mile and three sixteenths on dirt at Pimlico Race Course in Baltimore, Maryland. In that race, Play On was listed as the fourth favorite in a field of ten colts at 8:1 odds. The prohibitive odds-on favorite was Swale, the Kentucky Derby winner. Play On broke from the outside in the tenth post position and settled in mid-pack. Around the clubhouse turn and down the backstretch, Fight Over, Taylor's Special, and Swale led while Play On was reserved behind the leaders in fifth. Going into the final turn, Play On moved inside and took over third, one length behind Gate Dancer and Fight On. Down the stretch, Gate Dancer pulled away to win by 1 1/2 lengths over Play On, who finished strongly under jockey Jean-Luc Samyn to place second by four lengths over a tiring Fight On. Heavy favorite Swale weakened going into the final turn and faded to finish a non-threatening seventh, eight lengths back.

After his strong performance in the Preakness Stakes, Play On was sold to interests in Venezuela and entered a stud career there.
