= Charles Peoples =

American horse trainer (1924–1999)

Personal information
- Born: February 3, 1924 Oxford, Pennsylvania
- Died: September 17, 1999 (aged 75)
- Occupation: Trainer

Horse racing career
- Sport: Horse racing
- Career wins: 263

Major racing wins
- Bahamas Stakes (1959); Flamingo Stakes (1959); Pimlico Cup (1961); Shuvee Handicap (1977); Delaware Oaks (1980); Pennsylvania Derby (1983); Massachusetts Handicap (1984); Hopeful Stakes (1985); Hutcheson Stakes (1986, 1989); Fountain of Youth Stakes (1989); Private Terms Stakes (1990); Pegasus Handicap (1994)

Significant horses
- Dixieland Band, Papal Power, Baron de Vaux

Charles Peoples (February 3, 1924 – September 17, 1999) was an American Thoroughbred racehorse trainer.

Charles and his twin sister Isabel Peoples were born in 1924 to Charles and Annie Peoples, both first-generation immigrants to Chester County, Pennsylvania, from County Donegal, Ireland. In the latter part of the 1950s, he started conditioning horses for the operations of Bayard Sharp, a director of Delaware Park Racetrack and a president of The Blood-Horse Inc. Unknown to each other at the time they came together in racing, Sharp had been the teenage stranger who saved a four-year-old Charles Peoples and a small girl from drowning when he pulled them out of the bottom of a pond.

Based at Sharp Farm in Middletown, Delaware, Peoples started his racing career as a steeplechase rider, but soon turned to horse training and won a number of important races. In 1959, he won the Flamingo Stakes at Hialeah Park Race Track with Troilus. Sent to the Kentucky Derby under jockey Chris Rogers, Troilus moved from his tenth starting position into the lead at the half-mile mark but then stopped badly and finished last. It was later discovered that the colt had been suffering from an ulcer, and he died later that year from peritonitis.

Peoples also trained Dixieland Band, winner of the 1983 Pennsylvania Derby and the 1984 Massachusetts Handicap. In 1985, Peoples won the Grade I Hopeful Stakes with Papal Power.

Peoples died in 1999 at the age of seventy-five.

== Sources ==
- 1959 Kentucky Derby
- The New York Times April 9, 1989 article
- Dixieland Band Played On
- Dixieland Band
- Bayard Sharp was Delaware's man of Racing
- Dixieland Band
- An Ode to Troilus
- And Now Troilus, "Sports Illustrated" 1959
