= Dogwood Dominion Award =

Horse racing award

The Dogwood Dominion Award was an honor given annually to a person in American Thoroughbred horse racing. It was established in 1993 by W. Cothran "Cot" Campbell, president of the racing partnership Dogwood Stable, now based in Aiken, South Carolina. It was created to recognize the "unsung heroes" in the racing industry. The award was inspired by the multiple stakes winner Dominion (1972-1993) , who was raced by Dogwood Stable in the 1970s and who went on to become a five-time Champion Sire in England. In 2011, the Dogwood Dominion Award was no longer awarded.

Dominion Award Recipients:

- 2010 - Barbi Moline
- 2009 - Mary Lee-Butte
- 2008 - Vincent Garibaldi
- 2007 - Phyllis Shetron
- 2006 - Pete Lizarzaburu
- 2005 - Jo Anne Normile
- 2004 - Pam Berg
- 2003 - Neftali Gutierrez
- 2002 - Shirley Edwards & Jim Greene
- 2001 - Julian "Buck" Wheat
- 2000 - Katherine Todd Smith
- 1999 - Daniel Perlsweig
- 1998 - Donald "Peanut Butter" Brown
- 1997- Nick Caras
- 1996 - Grace Belcuore
- 1995 - Peggy Sprinkles
- 1994 - Howard "Gelo" Hall
- 1993 - H. W. "Salty" Roberts
