= Golden Act =

American-bred racehorse (1976–2000)

- Sire: Gummo
- Grandsire: Fleet Nasrullah
- Dam: Golden Shore
- Damsire: Windy Sands
- Sex: Stallion
- Foaled: 1976
- Country: United States
- Colour: Chestnut
- Breeder: William H. Oldknow & Robert W. Phipps
- Owner: William H. Oldknow & Robert W. Phipps
- Trainer: Loren Rettele
- Record: 30: 8-7-8
- Earnings: $928,268

Major wins
- El Camino Stakes (1978); Louisiana Derby (1979); Arkansas Derby (1979); Secretariat Stakes (1979); Lawrence Realization Stakes (1979); Canadian International Stakes (1979) American Triple Crown Races placing: Kentucky Derby 3rd Preakness Stakes 2nd Belmont Stakes 2nd

Awards
- California Horse of the Year (1979)
- Last updated on May 11, 2015

Golden Act (1976–2000) was an American Thoroughbred racehorse.

== Background ==
Golden Act was sired by Gummo, a grandson of Nasrullah who was a son of the extremely important sire, Nearco. he was out of the mare Golden Shore.

He was trained in California by Loren Rettele.

== Racing career ==
At age two Golden Act's most important stakes results were a win in the El Camino Stakes and a second to Flying Paster in the Norfolk Stakes. At age three, he was a standout in American racing but was overshadowed by Spectacular Bid, a future U.S. Racing Hall of Fame inductee and a horse ranked No.10 in the Blood-Horse magazine List of the Top 100 U.S. Racehorses of the 20th Century.

In the leadup to the 1979 U.S. Triple Crown series, Golden Act finished second in the California Derby at Golden Gate Fields in the San Francisco Bay Area. He then won the Louisiana Derby at the Fair Grounds Race Course in New Orleans and in April was sent to Oaklawn Park in Hot Springs, Arkansas where he won the Arkansas Derby.

Golden Act was ridden by future U.S. and Canadian Hall of Fame jockey Sandy Hawley. In the Kentucky Derby, they were up against a strong field that was led by the overwhelming favorite, Spectacular Bid, and included the second betting choice, Flying Paster, and the well-regarded General Assembly. Sent off at 19:1 odds, Golden Act finished third behind General Assembly and winner Spectacular Bid.

At Pimlico Race Course in Baltimore, Maryland for the second leg of the Triple Crown, Hawley brought Golden Act from the back of the field to finish second to Spectacular Bid in the Preakness Stakes. In New York's Belmont Stakes, the final leg of the Triple Crown, Golden Act used another strong stretch drive to overtake Spectacular Bid and finish second to upset winner Coastal.

Golden Act went on to win 1979's Secretariat Stakes and Lawrence Realization Stakes. In November's prestigious Canadian International Stakes on turf at Woodbine Racetrack in Toronto, Ontario, Canada, he defeated an international field that included Trillion, a multiple stakes winner from France. At age four, Golden Act returned to racing, with his best results coming in two Grade I races, the 1980 Turf Classic Invitational Stakes, where he finished second, and the Man o' War Stakes, where he ran third.

== Stud record ==
Retired to stud duty, Golden Act sired a number of winners, notably Silver Circus, a winner of the Grade I Hollywood Derby, and the successful steeplechase runner Almost Golden.

Golden Act died at the age of twenty-four on May 8, 2000, at Cardiff Stud Farm in Creston, California.
