= Golden Opinion =

American-bred Thoroughbred racehorse

- Sire: Slew o' Gold
- Grandsire: Seattle Slew
- Dam: Optimistic Lass
- Damsire: Mr. Prospector
- Sex: Mare
- Foaled: 23 February 1986
- Country: United States
- Colour: Chestnut
- Breeder: Darley Stud
- Owner: Sheikh Mohammed
- Trainer: André Fabre
- Record: 6: 4-1-1
- Earnings: £227,381

Major wins
- Prix Montenica (1989); Prix de Sandringham (1989); Coronation Stakes (1989); Prix du Rond Point (1989)

Awards
- Top-rated European three-year-old filly (1989)

Golden Opinion (23 February 1986 – after 2007) was an American-bred French-trained Thoroughbred racehorse and broodmare. In a racing career which lasted less than six months she won four of her six races. As a three-year-old in 1996 she won a Listed race on her debut and then finished third in the Poule d'Essai des Poulains before winning the Prix de Sandringham at Chantilly and the Coronation Stakes at Royal Ascot. She was narrowly beaten in the July Cup and ended her career with a six length win in the Prix du Rond Point. After being retired from racing she came a broodmare and produced several minor winners.

== Background ==
Golden Opinion was a chestnut filly with white socks on her front feet bred in Kentucky by her owner, Sheikh Mohammed's Darley Stud. She was from the first crop of foals sired by Slew o' Gold an outstanding performer on dirt in the United States who won Eclipse Awards in 1983 and 1984. Golden Opinion was the first foal of her dam Optimistic Lass who showed top-class form in a brief racing career, winning the Musidora Stakes and the Nassau Stakes in 1984. She later produced Joyful, the grand-dam of the Irish 1,000 Guineas winner Samitar. Golden Opinion was sent to Europe and entered training with André Fabre in France. She was ridden in all of her races by Cash Asmussen.

== Racing career ==
=== 1989: three-year-old season ===
Golden Opinion was unraced as a two-year-old and never contested a maiden race, beginning her racing career with a win in the Listed Prix Montenica over 1600 metres at Maisons-Laffitte Racecourse on 21 April. She was then stepped up to Group One class for the Poule d'Essai des Pouliches at Longchamp Racecourse on 14 May. She turned into the straight in fourth place before taking the lead 200 metres from the finish but was overtaken in the closing stages and finished third behind Pearl Bracelet and the Cheveley Park Stakes winner Pass the Peace. The unplaced runners included Tersa (Prix Morny), Oczy Czarnie (Prix de la Salamandre) and Mary Linoa (Prix Marcel Boussac). On 4 June, the filly started 3/5 favourite for the Group Three Prix de Sandringham at Chantilly Racecourse and won by three quarters of a length from Bubbling Danseuse.

Seventeen days after her win at Chantilly, Golden Opinion was sent to England to contest the 140th renewal of the Coronation Stakes over one mile at Royal Ascot. She was made the 7/2 favourite in a twelve-runners field which included Tessla (Fillies' Mile), Aldbourne (third in the 1000 Guineas) and Comic Talent, the winner of her last five races. Asmussen tracked the leaders and was third on the final turn before making a challenge in the straight. Golden Opinion overtook the outsider Magic Gleam inside the final furlong and won by half a length, with a gap of four lengths back to Guest Artiste in third place. She was the first French-trained winner of the race since Barbaresque in 1960. In July the filly was dropped in distance as well as being matched against colts and older horses when he returned to England to contest the Group One July Cup over six furlongs at Newmarket Racecourse. Racing against specialised sprinters she started 11/4 second favourite behind the colt Danehill. She appeared to be outpaced in the early stages but finished strongly and failed by only a head to catch the four-year-old Cadeaux Genereux. Danehill was two and a half lengths away in third.

After a late summer break, Golden Opinion returned in the Group Three Prix du Rond-Point over 1600 metres at Longchamp on 8 October. Starting the 2/5 favourite against eight opponents, she took the lead 200 metres from the finish and drew away in the closing stages to win "easily" by six lengths.

== Assessment ==
In the official International Classification for 1989, Golden Opinion was the top-rated female racehorse of any age in Europe.

== Breeding record ==
After her retirement from racing, Golden Opinion became a broodmare for her owner's Darley Stud. She produced at least ten foals and five minor winners between 1991 and 2007:

- Sun Music, a bay colt, foaled in 1991, sired by Sadler's Wells. Failed to win in two races.
- Legal Opinion, bay filly, 1993, by Polish Precedent. Failed to win in two races.
- Meiosis, bay filly, 1997, by Danzig. Won one race.
- Dareen, chestnut filly, 1998, by Rahy. Failed to win in two races.
- Goddess of Wisdom, bay filly, 1999, by Sadler's Wells. Won one race.
- Excellento, chestnut colt (later gelded), 2000, by Rahy. Won three races.
- Straw Poll, chestnut colt, 2001, by Dixieland Band. Won one race.
- Conjecture, bay colt (later gelded), 2002, by Danzig. Won four races.
- Fantastic Opinion, chestnut filly, 2006, by Fantastic Light. Failed to win in four races.
- Golden Ratio, bay filly, 2007, by Noverre. Failed to win in seven races.

== Pedigree ==
Pedigree of Golden Opinion (USA), chestnut mare 1986
Sire Slew o' Gold (USA) 1980	Seattle Slew (USA); 1974	Bold Reasoning	Boldnesian
Sire Slew o' Gold (USA) 1980	Seattle Slew (USA); 1974	Bold Reasoning	Reason To Earn
Sire Slew o' Gold (USA) 1980	Seattle Slew (USA); 1974	My Charmer	Power
Sire Slew o' Gold (USA) 1980	Seattle Slew (USA); 1974	My Charmer	Fair Charmer
Sire Slew o' Gold (USA) 1980	Alluvial (USA); 1969	Buckpasser	Tom Fool
Sire Slew o' Gold (USA) 1980	Alluvial (USA); 1969	Buckpasser	Busanda
Sire Slew o' Gold (USA) 1980	Alluvial (USA); 1969	Bayou	Hill Prince
Sire Slew o' Gold (USA) 1980	Alluvial (USA); 1969	Bayou	Bourtai
Dam Optimistic Lass (USA) 1981	Mr. Prospector (USA); 1970	Raise a Native	Native Dancer
Dam Optimistic Lass (USA) 1981	Mr. Prospector (USA); 1970	Raise a Native	Raise You
Dam Optimistic Lass (USA) 1981	Mr. Prospector (USA); 1970	Gold Digger	Nashua
Dam Optimistic Lass (USA) 1981	Mr. Prospector (USA); 1970	Gold Digger	Sequence
Dam Optimistic Lass (USA) 1981	Loveliest (USA); 1973	Tibaldo	Tatan
Dam Optimistic Lass (USA) 1981	Loveliest (USA); 1973	Tibaldo	Elite
Dam Optimistic Lass (USA) 1981	Loveliest (USA); 1973	Lovely Ann	Flaming Fleet
Dam Optimistic Lass (USA) 1981	Loveliest (USA); 1973	Lovely Ann	Elisann (Family 2-f)
