= Alluvial (horse) =

American-bred Thoroughbred racehorse

- Sire: Buckpasser
- Grandsire: Tom Fool
- Dam: Bayou
- Damsire: Hill Prince
- Sex: Mare
- Foaled: 1969
- Died: 1994
- Country: United States
- Colour: Chestnut
- Breeder: Claiborne Farm
- Owner: Claiborne Farm
- Trainer: Unraced
- Record: N/A
- Earnings: N/A

Alluvial (foaled 1969 in Kentucky) was an American Thoroughbred broodmare.

== Background ==
Alluvial was sired by U.S. Racing Hall of Fame inductee Buckpasser, who in turn was sired by the 1953 United States Horse of the Year, Tom Fool, out of the Hill Prince mare Bayou. Alluvial was a half-sister, through Bayou, to the graded stakes race winning filly Batteur, who won the Santa Monica Handicap, Santa Margarita Handicap, Santa Maria Handicap, and Santa Barbara Handicap, as well as the New York Handicap.

== Breeding record ==
Alluvial was unraced and is known for her success as a broodmare. She is the dam of Belmont Stakes winner Coastal, by Majestic Prince, and champion Slew o' Gold, by Seattle Slew.

Her daughter Dokki is the dam of Aptitude, who was second in both the 2000 Kentucky Derby and Belmont Stakes, and stakes winner Sleep Easy.

On May 23, 1994, Alluvial died at Claiborne Farm due to the infirmities of old age.

== Resources ==
- Pedgigree & Partial Stats
