= Castleton baronets =

Extinct baronetcy in the Baronetage of England

The Castleton Baronetcy, of St Edmundsbury in the County of Suffolk, was a title in the Baronetage of England. It was created on 9 August 1641 for William Castleton, High Sheriff of Suffolk from 1641 to 1642. The second Baronet was High Sheriff of Suffolk from 1660 to 1661. The sixth Baronet was Rector of Gillingham, Norfolk. The eleventh Baronet was Rector of Thornham, Norfolk. The title became extinct on the death of the twelfth Baronet in 1810.

== Castleton baronets, of St Edmundsbury (1641) ==
Escutcheon of the Castleton baronets of St Edmundsbury

- Sir William Castleton, 1st Baronet (c. 1590–c. 1643)
- Sir John Castleton, 2nd Baronet (died 1677)
- Sir John Castleton, 3rd Baronet (1644–1705)
- Sir Robert Castleton, 4th Baronet (1659–c. 1710)
- Sir Philip Castleton, 5th Baronet (1663–1724)
- Sir Charles Castleton, 6th Baronet (1659–1745)
- Sir Charles Castleton, 7th Baronet (died 1749)
- Sir John Castleton, 8th Baronet (c. 1698–1777)
- Sir William Castleton, 9th Baronet (c. 1701–1788)
- Sir John Castleton, 10th Baronet (died 1788)
- Sir Edward Castleton, 11th Baronet (c. 1706–1794)
- Sir Edward Castleton, 12th Baronet (c. 1752–1810)
