= D' Funnybone =

American Thoroughbred racehorse

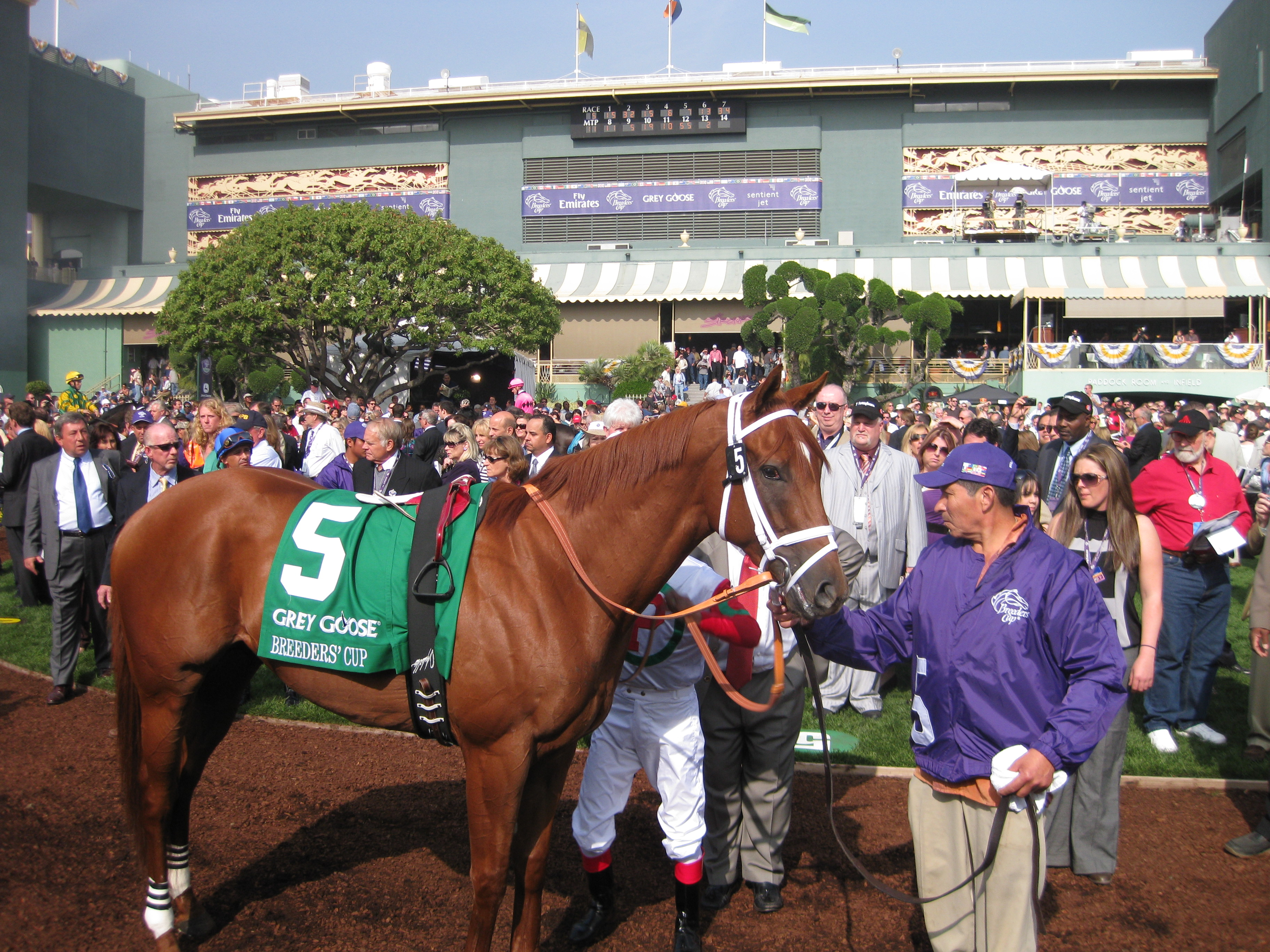
- D' Funnybone preparing for the Breeders' Cup Juvenile
- Sire: D'Wildcat
- Grandsire: Forest Wildcat
- Dam: Elbow
- Damsire: Woodman
- Sex: Stallion
- Foaled: 2007
- Country: United States
- Colour: Chestnut
- Breeder: Harold Plumley
- Owner: Paul Pompa Jr.
- Trainer: Richard E. Dutrow, Jr.
- Record: 15: 6-3-0
- Earnings: US $686,700

Major wins
- Saratoga Special Stakes (2009); Belmont Futurity Stakes (2009); Hutcheson Stakes (2010); Swale Stakes (2010); Woody Stephens Stakes (2010)

D' Funnybone (foaled January 14, 2007 in Kentucky) is a retired American Thoroughbred racehorse. A multiple graded stakes winner, he is now a stallion.

== Background ==
A chestnut horse, D' Funnybone is sired by D'Wildcat, who is also known as the sire of American stakes winners Wildcat Red and Authenicat, and Mexican Champion Three-Year-Old Filly Telis. D'Funnybone is out of the Woodman mare Elbow.

D' Funnybone was bred in Florida and originally raced for Harold Plumley, though later was privately purchased as a juvenile by Paul Pompa Jr.

Richard Dutrow trained the colt throughout his career.

== Racing career ==
=== 2009: Juvenile Season ===
As a two-year-old, D' Funnybone won in his first start on May 23, 2009 at Calder Race Course in a maiden special weight race. He made his stakes debut in his next start, the ungraded Frank Gomex Memorial Stakes, finishing second. He then won the Saratoga Special by 10 1/2 lengths for his first stakes win. He won his second stakes race afterwards, winning the Belmont Futurity by 4 3/4 lengths.

Entered in the 2009 Breeders' Cup Juvenile, D' Funnybone was sent off at 5-2 odds, the second choice behind Lookin At Lucky. In the race, he pressed the pace early, but faded to last. The race was won by 30-1 longshot Vale of York.

At the 2009 Eclipse Awards, D' Funnybone received one vote for American Champion Two-Year-Old Male Horse.

=== 2010: Sophomore Season ===
D' Funnybone won the Hutcheson Stakes at Gulfstream Park in his sophomore debut, winning as the favorite by a length. The colt continued his winning ways in the Swale Stakes, winning again as the favorite by 1 1/2 lengths. "It was easy", said jockey Edgar Prado after the Swale. "To me, the way he is running now is great, and we’ll leave it up to Rick (Dutrow) whether we try and take on more distance."

After the Hutcheson and Swale Stakes, D' Funnybone was considered one of the country's top sprinters.

In his next start, D' Funnybone stretched out to the distance of one mile in the Withers Stakes at Aqueduct. He again raced close to a fast early pace, then tired in the stretch, finishing fourth. Cutting back to seven furlongs in the Woody Stephens, D' Funnybone stayed farther off the pace and then unleashed a strong stretch run to win by 3 1/4 lengths. "Edgar has been breezing him (at Aqueduct), and he told me he doesn't like the track so much," said Dutrow. "We know he likes this track and things set up absolutely perfect for him. He did what he was supposed to. When I saw (the early leaders) going with each other, I couldn't ask for anything better. Even though he was further back than usual, Edgar knew what he was doing, and he knew he had plenty of time to catch up."

In his final two starts as a three-year-old, D' Funnybone finished second in the Carry Back Stakes and seventh in the King's Bishop Stakes.

=== 2011: Four-Year-Old Season ===
D' Funnybone began his first season as an older horse in the Sunshine State Stakes, an ungraded black type stakes held at Gulfstream Park, finishing fourth. He improved in his next race, finishing second in the Waldoboro Stakes at Belmont Park. D' Funnybone returned to the graded ranks in the True North Handicap next, but finished fourth behind Trappe Shot. In his final start, D' Funnybone finished 8th in the listed James Marvin Stakes at Saratoga.

D' Funnybone retired with a record of 15: 6-3-0 with earnings of $686,700.

D' Funnybone raced six more times but his best finish was a second-place performance in the Carry Back Stakes. He was retired at the end of 2011 and entered stud at Vinery New York. He currently stands at Rockridge Stud in Hudson, New York.

== Stallion career ==
In 2012, D' Funnybone entered stud at Tom Simon's Vinery Stud New York (Sugar Maple Farm) and stood for an initial fee of $3,500. In 2014, D' Funnybone was moved to stand at Rockridge Stud in Hudson, New York, along with other Vinery Stallions, after Vinery's Sugar Maple Farm was sold. He currently stands at Rockridge Stud.

D' Funnybone was represented by his first foal in February 2013. The bay filly, later named D Secret Halo, was out of out of the winning Saint Ballado mare Ballado Hill. D' Funnybone's first winner came in July 2015, when colt Uno Emayo won a maiden race at Belmont Park by a neck length.

As of 2017, D' Funnybone's top progeny includes stakes winners Rip Loves Maize and Uno Emayo.
