= Lord Avie =

American Thoroughbred racehorse

- Sire: Lord Gaylord
- Grandsire: Sir Gaylord
- Dam: Avie
- Damsire: Gallant Man
- Sex: Stallion
- Foaled: 1978
- Country: United States
- Colour: Bay
- Breeder: Viking Farms Ltd.
- Owner: SKS Stable
- Trainer: Daniel Perlsweig
- Record: 16: 8-4-4
- Earnings: US$705,977

Major wins
- Juvenile Stakes (1980); Young America Stakes (1980); Cowdin Stakes (1980); Champagne Stakes (1980); Hutcheson Stakes (1981); Florida Derby (1981)

Awards
- American Champion Two-Year-Old Colt (1980)

Honours
- Lord Avie Stakes at Gulfstream Park

Lord Avie (April 25, 1978 – December 28, 2012) was an American thoroughbred champion racehorse.

== Background ==
A descendant of the great Nearco through his sire Lord Gaylord, his dam, Avie, was a daughter of U.S. Racing Hall of Fame inductee Gallant Man. In March 1980, Lord Avie was bought as a two-year-old at a Hialeah Park Race Track sale for $37,000 by a consortium of twelve investors from New Jersey who raced him under the name SKS Stable. He was trained by former jockey Daniel Perlsweig.

== Racing career ==
Lord Avie won top races at age two, including the Young America Stakes, Cowdin Stakes and Champagne Stakes. He was voted the 1980 Eclipse Award as American Champion Two-Year-Old Colt.

Racing at age three, on February 4, 1981, Lord Avie won the Hutcheson Stakes at Florida's Gulfstream Park. The colt went on to win the Florida Derby and was then installed by odds makers as the favorite for the Kentucky Derby. However, Lord Avie came out of the Florida Derby with a pulled suspensory ligament and did not race in any of the Triple Crown races. He returned to racing in mid-July with an allowance race win at Monmouth Park Racetrack followed by a second-place finish in the Grade 1 Haskell Invitational Handicap and then a third in August's Travers Stakes at Saratoga Race Course. In the Travers, Lord Avie reinjured his leg. On August 24, 1981, his retirement from racing was announced. Lord Avie won eight races, placed 4 times and showed 4 times in 16 starts, with career earnings of $705,977.

== Stud career ==
Lord Avie was sent to stand at stud at Spendthrift Farm in Lexington, Kentucky, having been syndicated for $10 million with the potential to escalate to $20 million, though the escalation was never triggered. He was the sire of seventy-four stakes winners including Grade 1 winners Magical Maiden, Fly For Avie, and multi-millionaire Cloudy's Knight, who was voted 2007 Canadian Champion Male Turf Horse. From his daughters, he is the damsire of 2007 American Champion Older Male Horse Lawyer Ron. Due to advancing age and declining fertility, Lord Avie was pensioned after the 2002 breeding season at Lane's End Farm near Versailles, Kentucky, where he had stood since 1989. By that time, he had sired 578 starters whose 429 individual winners had earned a total of $35,058,780 in their careers

== Pedigree ==
Pedigree of Lord Avie, brown stallion, 1978
| Sire Lord Gaylord | Sir Gaylord | Turn-To | Royal Charger |
| Sire Lord Gaylord | Sir Gaylord | Turn-To | Source Sucre |
| Sire Lord Gaylord | Sir Gaylord | Somethingroyal | Princequillo |
| Sire Lord Gaylord | Sir Gaylord | Somethingroyal | Imperatrice |
| Sire Lord Gaylord | Miss Glamour Gal | Ambiorix | Tourbillon |
| Sire Lord Gaylord | Miss Glamour Gal | Ambiorix | Lavendula |
| Sire Lord Gaylord | Miss Glamour Gal | Wild Music | Spy Song |
| Sire Lord Gaylord | Miss Glamour Gal | Wild Music | Hostility |
| Dam Avie | Gallant Man | Migoli | Bois Roussel |
| Dam Avie | Gallant Man | Migoli | Mah Iran |
| Dam Avie | Gallant Man | Majideh | Mahmoud |
| Dam Avie | Gallant Man | Majideh | Qurrat-Al-Ain |
| Dam Avie | Evilone | Tom Fool | Menow |
| Dam Avie | Evilone | Tom Fool | Gaga |
| Dam Avie | Evilone | High Stepper | Hyperion |
| Dam Avie | Evilone | High Stepper | Show A Leg (family: 1-1) |

== Sources ==
- Lord Avie's pedigree and partial racing stats
- February 16, 1981 Sports Illustrated article titled "Yea, The Lord Will Provide"
- March 9, 1981 Ocala Star-Banner article titled Lord Avie "Heads Pack In Run For The Roses"
- August 24, 1981 Spokane Daily Chronicle notice of Lord Avie's retirement
