= Housebuster =

American-bred Thoroughbred racehorse

- Sire: Mt. Livermore
- Grandsire: Blushing Groom
- Dam: Big Dreams
- Damsire: Great Above
- Sex: Stallion
- Foaled: 1987
- Country: United States
- Color: Dark Brown
- Breeder: Blanche P. Levy & Murphy Stable
- Owner: Robert P. Levy
- Trainer: Ronald L. Benshoff; Warren A. Croll Jr.
- Record: 22: 15-2-1
- Earnings: $1,229,696

Major wins
- Morven Stakes (1989); Hutcheson Stakes (1990); Jerome Handicap (1990); Withers Stakes (1990); Lafayette Stakes (1990); Derby Trial (1990); King's Bishop Stakes (1990); Spectacular Bid Stakes (1990); Swale Stakes (1990); Frank J. De Francis Memorial Dash Stakes (1991); Carter Handicap (1991); Vosburgh Stakes (1991); Forego Handicap (1991)

Awards
- American Champion Sprint Horse (1990, 1991)

Honors
- United States Racing Hall of Fame (2013)

Housebuster (foaled March 7, 1987, in Kentucky – May 15, 2005) was an American Thoroughbred racehorse and sire. He was sired by graded stakes race winner Mt. Livermore and was out of the Great Above mare Big Dreams.

Bred by Blanche P. Levy and owned by her son, Robert, Housebuster was originally trained by Ronald Benshoff before being turned over to "Jimmy" Croll. From the outset he was trained as a sprinter, with no race longer than a mile.

Housebuster won 15 of his lifetime 22 starts, often by wide margins. He won the Jerome Handicap by 13 lengths, the Grade III Lafayette Stakes by 11, and the "DeFrancis Dash" by 5, beating Breeder's Cup Sprint champ Safely Kept.

In the 1990 Metropolitan Handicap, he placed second by a neck to U.S. Horse of the Year Criminal Type, beating Hall of Fame Eclipse Award Champion Easy Goer while receiving 14 pounds in weight.

Housebuster made the last start of his racing career a winning one on September 28, 1991, in the Vosburgh Stakes at Belmont Park.

His outstanding record earned him the Eclipse Award for the 1990 American Champion Sprint Horse and again in 1991. He became the first horse to win the sprint title in successive years since Great Above's Hall of Fame dam Ta Wee did it in 1969–70.

In 2013, Housebuster was inducted into the National Museum of Racing and Hall of Fame in Saratoga Springs, New York.

== At stud ==
Retired due to an injury in the 1991 Breeder's Cup Sprint, Housebuster was originally sent in 1992 to Jonabell Farm to stand at stud and sired several good runners. However, as his fee dropped, he was sold and sent to Japan in 1998.

He returned to the U.S. in 2001 and stood at The Blue Ridge Farm in Virginia from 2002 to 2004 before being moved to O'Sullivan Farms in West Virginia in 2005. He died there on May 15, 2005.

Some of Housebuster's progeny who became graded stakes race winners include 2002 Hong Kong Horse of the Year Electronic Unicorn, Bahamian Pirate, Morluc, and Midnight Bet.

== Pedigree ==
Pedigree of Housebuster, dark brown/bay stallion, 1987
Sire Mt. Livermore	Blushing Groom	Red God	Nasrullah
Sire Mt. Livermore	Blushing Groom	Red God	Spring Run
Sire Mt. Livermore	Blushing Groom	Runaway Bride	Wild Risk
Sire Mt. Livermore	Blushing Groom	Runaway Bride	Aimee
Sire Mt. Livermore	Flama Ardiente	Crimson Satan	Spy Song
Sire Mt. Livermore	Flama Ardiente	Crimson Satan	Papila
Sire Mt. Livermore	Flama Ardiente	Royal Rafale	Reneged
Sire Mt. Livermore	Flama Ardiente	Royal Rafale	Questar
Dam Big Dreams	Great Above	Minnesota Mac	Rough'n Tumble
Dam Big Dreams	Great Above	Minnesota Mac	Cow Girl
Dam Big Dreams	Great Above	Ta Wee	Intentionally
Dam Big Dreams	Great Above	Ta Wee	Aspidistra
Dam Big Dreams	Dolphins Dream	New Prospect	Never Bend
Dam Big Dreams	Dolphins Dream	New Prospect	Hasty Act
Dam Big Dreams	Dolphins Dream	Green Dolphin	Johns Joy
Dam Big Dreams	Dolphins Dream	Green Dolphin	Fly Bye Babe (family: 13)
