= Young America Stakes =

Discontinued horse race

The Young America Stakes is a discontinued Thoroughbred horse race that was run annually at the Meadowlands Racetrack in East Rutherford, New Jersey.

== History ==
Inaugurated in 1977, the Young America Stakes evolved to become an important end of October/early November event for two-year-olds. The race was contested over a distance of 11/16 miles. Run on dirt from inception in 1977 through 1990, at its peak in the mid-1980s it was a Grade 1 event offering a purse of $500,000 and had been attracting such horses as U.S. Racing Hall of Fame inductee, Spectacular Bid and Canadian Horse Racing Hall of Fame colt, Deputy Minister. However, the event was hurt by the advent of the Breeders' Cup Juvenile in 1984 which was raced at around the same time and on dirt. In an attempt to survive, in 1991 the Young America was shifted to a race on turf. Already having lost it Grade 1 status, in 1993 it was downgraded from a Grade II event to a Grade III.

Forevere Casting, ridden by jockey Eddie Delahoussaye won the inaugural running of the Young America Stakes in November 1977, winning the purse of $144,500 with a victory by a neck in 1:45.6 over Believe It.

National Museum of Racing and Hall of Fame jockey Jorge Velásquez won this race four times; in 1978 with Spectacular Bid, in 1979 with Koluctoo Bay, in 1980 with Lord Avie and in 1987 aboard Firery Ensign. After a disappointing start, Firery Ensign came back to win the $500,000 race in a time of 1:45, winning by 1¼ lengths to give Velásquez his fourth winner in the 11th running of the race.

There was another "Young America Stakes" raced in the last decades of the 19th century at a racetrack in Nashville, Tennessee.

== Winners ==
- 1995 - Defacto
- 1994 - Miss Union Avenue
- 1993 - Seattle Rob
- 1992 - Mischievous Music
- 1991 - Maston
- 1990 - Southern Sign
- 1989 - Roanoke
- 1988 - Irish Actor
- 1987 - Firery Ensign
- 1986 - Conquistarose
- 1985 - Storm Cat
- 1984 - Script Ohio
- 1983 - Swale
- 1982 - Slewpy
- 1981 - Deputy Minister
- 1980 - Lord Avie
- 1979 - Koluctoo Bay
- 1978 - Spectacular Bid
- 1977 - Forever Casting

== Sources ==
- October 31, 1987 New York Times article on the Young America Stakes
