= 1984 Prix de l'Arc de Triomphe =

- Location: Longchamp Racecourse
- Date: October 7, 1984
- Winning horse: Sagace

The 1984 Prix de l'Arc de Triomphe was a horse race held at Longchamp on Sunday 7 October 1984. It was the 63rd running of the Prix de l'Arc de Triomphe.

The winner was Sagace, a four-year-old horse trained in France by Patrick Biancone and ridden by Yves Saint-Martin. Sagace stayed on in tremendous style and won by 2 and 6 lengths from Northern Trick, stable-mate and previous year's winner All Along and Esprit du Nord in a time of 2:39.1 in a twenty-two runner field. Time Charter and Sun Princess showed up early in the straight, but their efforts were short-lived. Rainbow Quest was a dismal failure. Australian horse Strawberry Road ran a great race, fading out of contention only in the closing stages after having looked the winner soon after the turn for home. Northern Trick was the only serious challenger to Sagace in the final two furlongs. Her late run, though, was not enough to tear down the tough winner. All Along and Sun Princess hated the sticky ground on that day.

== Race details ==
- Sponsor: Trusthouse Forte
- Purse: Total: 4,250,000 FF – Winner: 2,500,000 FF
- Going: Heavy
- Distance: 2,400 metres
- Number of runners: 22
- Winner's time: 2:39.1

== Full result ==
Pos.	Marg.	Horse	Age	Jockey	Trainer (Country)
1		Sagace	4	Yves Saint-Martin	Patrick Biancone (FR)
2	2	Northern Trick	3	Cash Asmussen	François Boutin (FR)
3	6	All Along	5	Walter Swinburn	Patrick Biancone (FR)
4	¾	Esprit du Nord	4	Billy Newnes	John Fellows (FR)
5	nk	Strawberry Road	5	Greville Starkey	John Nicholls (AUS)
6	snk	Cariellor	3	Freddy Head	André Fabre (FR)
7	1½	Long Mick	3	G. Guignard	François Boutin (FR)
8	8	Sadler's Wells	3	Pat Eddery	Vincent O'Brien (IRE)
9	1½	Sun Princess (GB)	4	Willie Carson	Dick Hern (GB)
10	1	Lovely Dancer	4	Alain Lequeux	Olivier Douieb (FR)
11		Time Charter	5	Steve Cauthen	Henry Candy (GB)
12		Margello	6	Antoine Perrotta	Gerard Philippeau (FR)
13		Garde Royale	4	Gerard Dubroeucq	André Fabre (FR)
14		Princess Pati	3	Pat Shanahan	Con Collins (IRE)
15		Estrapade	4	Henri Samani	Maurice Zilber (FR)
16		Arctic Lord	4	Christy Roche	David O’Brien (IRE)
17		Abary (GER)	4	Maurice Philipperon	Heinz Jentzsch (GER)
18		Rainbow Quest	3	Tony Murray	Jeremy Tree (GB)
19		Balkan Prince	3	J.-C. Desaint	H. Van de Poele (FR)
20		Fly Me	4	Alfred Gibert	André Fabre (FR)
21		Castle Guard	4	Éric Legrix	Patrick Biancone (FR)
22		Donzel	3	Brian Rouse	Jeremy Tree (GB)

- Abbreviations: ns = nose; shd = short-head; hd = head; snk = short neck; nk = neck

== Winner's details ==
Further details of the winner, Sagace.

- Sex: Colt
- Foaled: 26 Mai 1980
- Country: France
- Sire: Luthier; Dam: Seneca (Chaparral)
- Owner: Daniel Wildenstein
- Breeder: Daniel Wildenstein
