= Gate Dancer =

American-bred Thoroughbred racehorse

- Sire: Sovereign Dancer
- Grandsire: Northern Dancer
- Dam: Sun Gate
- Damsire: Bull Lea
- Sex: Stallion
- Foaled: 1981
- Country: United States
- Colour: Bay
- Breeder: William R. Davis
- Owner: Kenneth Opstein
- Trainer: Jack Van Berg
- Record: 28: 7-8-7
- Earnings: US$2,501,705

Major wins
- Super Derby (1984); Omaha Gold Cup (1984); Cornhusker Handicap (1985) American Classic Race wins: Preakness Stakes (1984)

Honours
- Gate Dancer Street in Elkhorn, Nebraska
- Last updated on May 16, 2007

Gate Dancer (1981–1998) was an American Thoroughbred racehorse best known as a winner of an American Classic Race, the Preakness Stakes, and for his part in a three-horse finish in the inaugural running of the Breeders' Cup Classic.

Bred in Florida by William R. Davis, Gate Dancer was a son of Sovereign Dancer, in turn a son of the great Northern Dancer. He was out of the mare Sun Gate, whose sire was Bull Lea, a five-time Leading sire in North America. Owned by Ken Opstein. Trained by Jack Van Berg, on the racetrack the high-strung colt became distressed from the sounds of the crowd until his trainer devised a hood for his head with earmuffs that minimized the noise.

== Racing career ==
=== Early career ===
In June 1983, Gate Dancer won his two-year-old racing debut Ak-Sar-Ben Racetrack in Omaha, Nebraska. He raced once more in Omaha, then compete twice in California. Of his four starts that year, he ended up with two wins and two seconds. In his three-year-old season, Gate Dancer was aimed toward the Kentucky Derby. Staying in California, in February 1984 he ran second in the El Camino Real Derby at Bay Meadows and two weeks later at Santa Anita Park won an allowance race. In March, he finished second in the San Felipe and third in the Santa Catalina Stakes. Gate Dancer then had another third in April's Arkansas Derby behind Althea, whose winning time equaled the Oaklawn Park track record for 1 1/8 miles (1.8 km). Althea, the 1983 U.S. Champion 2-Year-Old Filly, became the heavy betting favorite going into the Kentucky Derby.

=== 1984 U.S. Triple Crown ===
Ridden by Eddie Delahoussaye in the Kentucky Derby, Gate Dancer was sent off at longshot odds of 19:1. Starting at the far outside in post position twenty, he immediately ran into difficulty but by the mile pole had moved up to ninth place with race favorite Althea tiring badly and dropping out of contention. Gate Dancer tried in vain to catch the leaders down the homestretch but veered in, bumping another horse several times. He finished fourth behind Claiborne Farm's winning colt, Swale. Following an interference complaint over the bumping incident, Churchill Downs stewards set Gate Dancer back to fifth place.

For the Preakness Stakes, jockey Ángel Cordero Jr. was aboard Gate Dancer. This time, the colt had a clean start in the much smaller field of nine and won the second leg of the Triple Crown series. Swale, the heavily favored Derby winner, finished well back in seventh place. However, in the grueling 1 1/2-mile (2.4 km) Belmont Stakes, Gate Dancer moved into contention as they headed into the homestretch but after making a charge at the front-running Swale, he tired and dropped back to finish sixth.

=== Breeders' Cup Classic ===
Following his loss in the Belmont Stakes, Gate Dancer's handlers brought him back to his first home at Ak-Sar-Ben Racetrack in Nebraska, where in August he won the 1984 Omaha Gold Cup. In his next start in September, he set a new track record for a mile and a quarter in winning the 1984 Super Derby at Louisiana Downs. In November, he was shipped to Hollywood Park Racetrack for the inaugural running of the Breeders' Cup Classic. Gate Dancer, Wild Again, and Slew o' Gold battled head to head through the stretch and all the way to the finish line. Wild Again was on the rail, with Gate Dancer on the outside and Slew o' Gold in close quarters between his rivals. The stretch run contained bumping, with Wild Again coming out on top and Gate Dancer crossing the wire second. However, Gate Dancer was disqualified for interfering with Slew o' Gold and moved down to third place, while Slew o' Gold officially finished second. At the end of 1984, Jack Van Berg was voted the Eclipse Award for Outstanding Trainer.

=== 1985 and 1986 ===
In 1985, Gate Dancer started ten times, winning once and capturing second and third place on three occasions each. Back for his second attempt in the Breeders' Cup Classic, he finished second to the Darby Dan Farm colt Proud Truth. Raced three times in 1986, Gate Dancer earned a fifth-place finish in the Santa Anita Handicap and a third in the Widener. In the final race of his career, he came in second in the Oaklawn Handicap.

== Career as a sire ==
Retired to Florida, Gate Dancer initially stood at stud at owner Kenneth Opstein's Good Chance Farm near Ocala in south Marion County, Florida and eventually ended up at Silverleaf Farm near Summerfield. Although he sired 27 stakes winners, none achieved the same level of racing success as Gate Dancer. On March 6, 1998, after a long struggle with laminitis, he was humanely euthanized. He was buried at Johnson Hollow Farm, near Oxford, Florida.

Nebraska artist Gwen G. Sides painted a portrait of Gate Dancer.

== Breeding ==
Pedigree of Gate Dancer
Sire Sovereign Dancer bay 1975	Northern Dancer bay 1961	Nearctic	Nearco
Sire Sovereign Dancer bay 1975	Northern Dancer bay 1961	Nearctic	Lady Angela
Sire Sovereign Dancer bay 1975	Northern Dancer bay 1961	Natalma	Native Dancer
Sire Sovereign Dancer bay 1975	Northern Dancer bay 1961	Natalma	Almahmoud
Sire Sovereign Dancer bay 1975	Bold Princess bay 1960	Bold Ruler	Nasrullah
Sire Sovereign Dancer bay 1975	Bold Princess bay 1960	Bold Ruler	Miss Disco
Sire Sovereign Dancer bay 1975	Bold Princess bay 1960	Grey Flight	Mahmoud
Sire Sovereign Dancer bay 1975	Bold Princess bay 1960	Grey Flight	Planetoid
Dam Sun Gate bay 1964	Bull Lea brown 1935	Bull Dog	Teddy
Dam Sun Gate bay 1964	Bull Lea brown 1935	Bull Dog	Plucky Liege
Dam Sun Gate bay 1964	Bull Lea brown 1935	Rose Leaves	Ballot
Dam Sun Gate bay 1964	Bull Lea brown 1935	Rose Leaves	Colonial
Dam Sun Gate bay 1964	Princess Gate bay 1957	Sun Again	Sun Teddy
Dam Sun Gate bay 1964	Princess Gate bay 1957	Sun Again	Hug Again
Dam Sun Gate bay 1964	Princess Gate bay 1957	Siena Way	Bull Lea
Dam Sun Gate bay 1964	Princess Gate bay 1957	Siena Way	Hydroplane
