= Coastal (horse) =

American-bred Thoroughbred racehorse

- Sire: Majestic Prince
- Grandsire: Raise A Native
- Dam: Alluvial
- Damsire: Buckpasser
- Sex: Stallion
- Foaled: 1976
- Country: United States
- Color: Chestnut
- Breeder: Claiborne Farm
- Owner: William Haggin Perry
- Trainer: David A. Whiteley
- Record: 14: 8-1-3
- Earnings: $493,929

Major wins
- Haskell Invitational Handicap (1979); Dwyer Stakes (1979); Peter Pan Stakes (1979); Tyro Stakes (1978) Triple Crown race wins: Belmont Stakes (1979)
- Last updated on September 24, 2007

Coastal (April 6, 1976 – September 29, 2005), foaled at Claiborne Farm in Kentucky, was an American Thoroughbred racehorse best known for winning the 1979 Belmont Stakes.

== Background ==
He was sired by U.S. Racing Hall of Fame inductee Majestic Prince out of the mare Alluvial, who was in turn was sired by U.S. Racing Hall of Fame stallion Buckpasser. He was a half-brother, through Alluvial, to Slew o' Gold. He was owned by William Haggin Perry and trained by David A. Whiteley.

== Racing career ==
In 1979, the three-year-old Coastal did not run in the Kentucky Derby and Preakness Stakes, having made his first start in April as a result of a serious eye injury that had cut short his racing at age two. Prior to entering the mile and one-half Belmont Stakes, Coastal had raced only three times that year. He won all three under Ruben Hernandez, but at distances of six then seven furlongs followed by the Peter Pan Stakes at a mile and one-eighth. His owner decided to pay the supplemental nomination fee and run the colt in the Belmont Stakes. Coastal and Hernandez then won the Belmont in a huge upset over Spectacular Bid, (who placed third), becoming the first supplemental entry to ever win the race.

Coastal next won the Dwyer Stakes on July 7, 1979, and the Haskell Invitational Handicap on August 4. He finished second to Affirmed in the Woodward Stakes and third in the Marlboro Cup Invitational Handicap behind Spectacular Bid and General Assembly. Then, in the Grade I Jockey Club Gold Cup, in a stretch battle with rivals Spectacular Bid and Affirmed, he again placed third, with Affirmed winning the race.

== Retirement ==
Coastal was retired to stud at Claiborne Farm in Kentucky. In 1988, he was sent to Mick Goss' Summerhill Stud in South Africa. He sired graded stakes winners Cherry Jubilee, Dangers Hour, Little Brianne, and Canadian multiple stakes winner Triple Wow.

Pensioned in the spring of 2003, Coastal died on September 29, 2005.

== Pedigree ==
Pedigree of Coastal, chestnut colt, 1976
Sire Majestic Prince	Raise a Native	Native Dancer	Polynesian
Sire Majestic Prince	Raise a Native	Native Dancer	Geisha
Sire Majestic Prince	Raise a Native	Raise You	Case Ace
Sire Majestic Prince	Raise a Native	Raise You	Lady Glory
Sire Majestic Prince	Gay Hostess	Royal Charger	Nearco
Sire Majestic Prince	Gay Hostess	Royal Charger	Sun Princess
Sire Majestic Prince	Gay Hostess	Your Hostess	Alibhai
Sire Majestic Prince	Gay Hostess	Your Hostess	Boudoir
Dam Alluvial	Buckpasser	Tom Fool	Menow
Dam Alluvial	Buckpasser	Tom Fool	Gaga
Dam Alluvial	Buckpasser	Busanda	War Admiral
Dam Alluvial	Buckpasser	Busanda	Businesslike
Dam Alluvial	Bayou	Hill Prince	Princequillo
Dam Alluvial	Bayou	Hill Prince	Hildene
Dam Alluvial	Bayou	Bourtai	Stimulus
Dam Alluvial	Bayou	Bourtai	Escutcheon (family: 9-f)
