= Spectacular Bid =

American-bred Thoroughbred racehorse

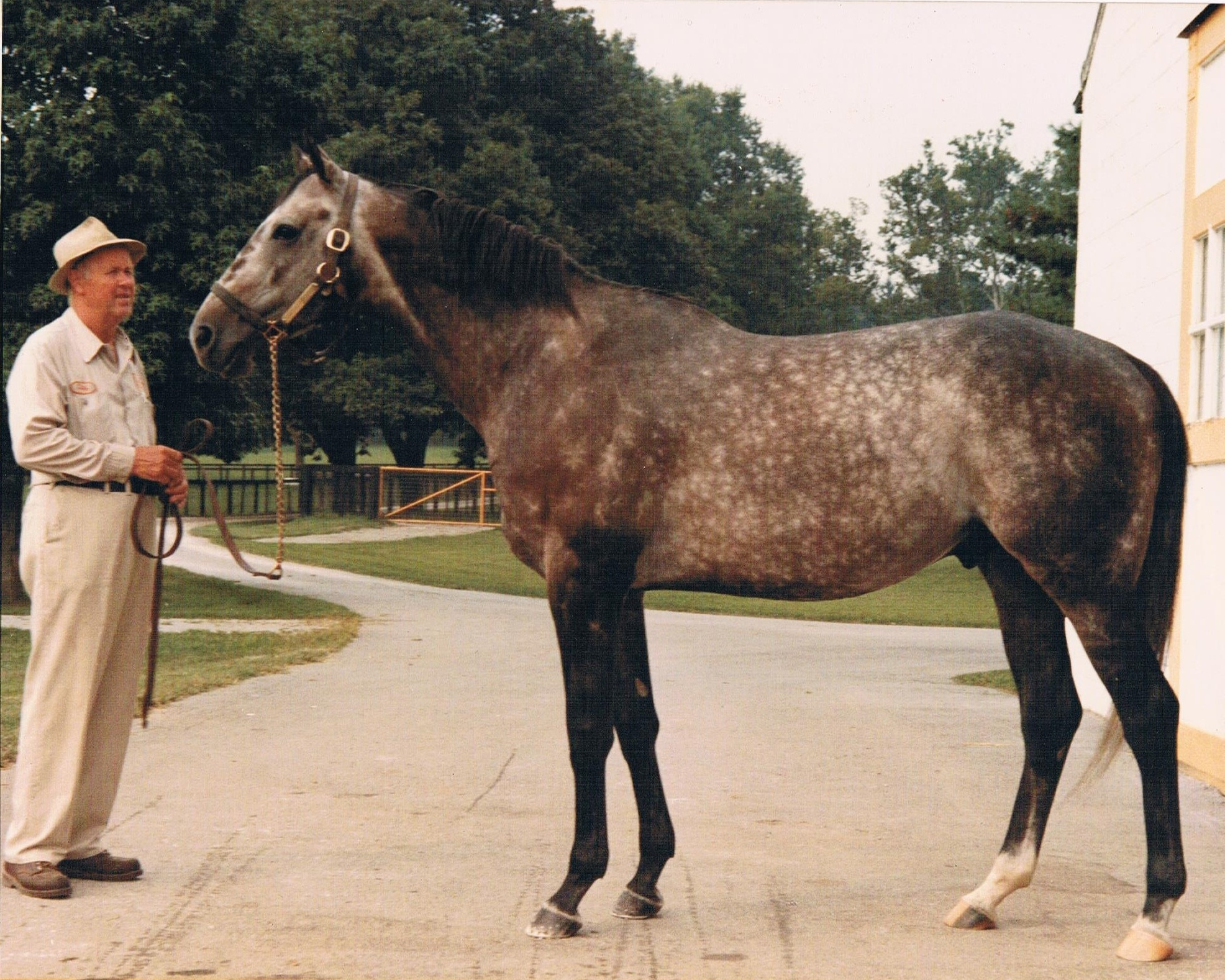
- Spectacular Bid at Claiborne Farm in 1981
- Sire: Bold Bidder
- Grandsire: Bold Ruler
- Dam: Spectacular
- Damsire: Promised Land
- Sex: Stallion
- Foaled: 17 February 1976
- Died: June 9, 2003 (aged 27)
- Country: United States
- Colour: brown (young), grey (old)
- Breeder: Madelyn Jason; Mrs. William Gilmore
- Owner: Hawksworth Farm; Racing colors: Blue, black cross sashes, blue bars on black sleeves, black cap.
- Trainer: Bud Delp
- Record: 30: 26-2-1
- Earnings: $2,781,608

Major wins
- Champagne Stakes (1978); Laurel Futurity (1978); Young America Stakes (1978); Hutcheson Stakes (1979); Fountain of Youth Stakes (1979); Flamingo Stakes (1979); Florida Derby (1979); Blue Grass Stakes (1979); Marlboro Cup (1979); Strub Series (1980); San Fernando Stakes (1980); Santa Anita Handicap (1980); Mervyn Leroy Handicap (1980); Californian Stakes (1980); Washington Park Handicap (1980); Amory L. Haskell Handicap (1980); Woodward Stakes (1980) American Classic Race wins: Kentucky Derby (1979); Preakness Stakes (1979)

Awards
- American Champion 2-Year-Old Colt (1978); American Champion 3-Year-Old Male Horse (1979); American Champion Older Male Horse (1980); American Horse of the Year (1980)

Honours
- United States Racing Hall of Fame inductee (1982) #10 – Top 100 U.S. Racehorses of the 20th Century; Spectacular Bid Stakes run at Gulfstream Park

Spectacular Bid (foaled February 17, 1976 – June 9, 2003) was a champion American Thoroughbred racehorse who won the 1979 Kentucky Derby and Preakness Stakes. He holds the world record for the fastest 10 furlongs on dirt, and also broke several track records. (A furlong is 1/8 mi or 0.20 km.) He won 26 of his 30 races and earned a then-record $2,781,607. He also won Eclipse Awards in each of his three racing seasons.

Spectacular Bid was the leading American two-year-old of 1978, winning the Champagne Stakes and the Laurel Futurity. As a three-year-old, he won the Kentucky Derby and the Preakness Stakes, giving him twelve consecutive victories. Spectacular Bid then tried to become the third consecutive Triple Crown winner, but he only came third in the Belmont Stakes after hurting his foot before the race. He recovered from the injury to win the Marlboro Cup and confirm his status as the best American colt of his generation. He was named American Champion Three-Year-Old Male Horse for 1979. In 1980 as a four-year-old, Spectacular Bid was undefeated in nine races, and was named American Horse of the Year.

== Background ==
Spectacular Bid was bred at Buck Pond Farm near Lexington, Kentucky by Madelyn Jason and her mother, Mrs. William Gilmore. He was a very dark gray (described as "steel-gray" and "battleship-colored") during his racing career although, like all grays, his coat lightened as he aged, and he eventually took on a "flea-bitten gray" appearance.

His sire was Bold Bidder, stakes winner of 13 races who also sired the 1974 Kentucky Derby winner, Cannonade. His grandsire was Bold Ruler, a U.S. Racing Hall of Fame inductee and an eight-time Leading sire in North America. His dam was the gray mare Spectacular by Promised Land, who, as a descendant of the broodmare Fly By Night, was a member of the same branch of Thoroughbred Family 2-d which also produced the Kentucky Derby winners Northern Dancer and Cannonade. Spectacular Bid was inbred 3x3 to the stallion To Market, meaning that this horse appears twice in the third generation of his pedigree. As of 2012 he remains one of the two most inbred Kentucky Derby winners in the last 50 years (Big Brown was similarly inbred to Northern Dancer).

As a yearling, Spectacular Bid was sold at auction for US$37,000 (equivalent to $197,000 in 2025) at the 1977 Keeneland September yearling sale to Harry and Teresa Meyerhoff of Hawksworth Farm, on the Eastern Shore of Maryland. The colt was sent into training with Grover G. "Bud" Delp, who remained his trainer throughout his career.

== Racing record ==
=== 1978: two-year-old season ===
Spectacular Bid began his racing career on June 30, 1978, at Pimlico Race Course, where he came within 2/5 of a second of the track record for 5 1/2 furlongs. Three weeks later at his next start at Pimlico, an allowance race, he equalled the track record of 1:04.2. He notched stakes victories in the Grade III World's Playground Stakes, the Grade I Champagne Stakes, the Young America Stakes, the Grade I Laurel Futurity (in which he set a track record, a rarity for a two-year-old in a route race, running 1 1/16 mi or 1.7 km in 1:41.6), and the Heritage Stakes. He also finished second in the Dover Stakes and had his only out-of-the-money finish in the Tyro Stakes. Spectacular Bid's regular jockey was the teenager Ronnie Franklin.

By the end of his first year of racing, Spectacular Bid had won seven races in nine starts, set one track record and tied another, won US$384,484 and been unanimously voted the Eclipse champion two-year-old colt for the year.

=== 1979: three-year-old season ===
==== Preparing for the Triple Crown ====
Spectacular Bid's second year of racing began where his first left off, as he reeled off five wins in rapid succession: the Hutcheson Stakes, the Fountain of Youth, the Florida Derby (all at Gulfstream Park), the Flamingo Stakes (at Hialeah), and the Blue Grass Stakes (at Keeneland Race Course). After the Florida Derby, which Spectacular Bid won by 4 1/2 lengths despite meeting trouble in running, Delp reprimanded Franklin in public over his ride: "You idiot! You nearly killed that horse!". Franklin defended himself by claiming that the other riders had colluded to stop Spectacular Bid obtaining a clear run.

==== Triple Crown attempt ====
Spectacular Bid's attempt at the Triple Crown began with the Kentucky Derby at Churchill Downs in May 1979. The crowd of 125,000 made him the 3/5 favorite, with California champion Flying Paster the bettors' second choice. Spectacular Bid seemed nervous before the start, but Delp was so confident of victory that as the horse paraded in front of the fans, he called, "Go bet! Go bet!" Spectacular Bid was restrained by Franklin in the early stages before moving up on the outside to take the lead on the far turn. He drew clear in the straight and won by 2 3/4 lengths over General Assembly, with Golden Act in third. After suffering a leg cut during the race, Flying Paster finished fifth. Spectacular Bid was the last two-year-old champion to win the Kentucky Derby until Street Sense in 2007.

Spectacular Bid's next step in the quest for the Triple Crown came at the Preakness Stakes at Pimlico. Bumped early, he ran wide and by the final stretch was in command. He handily won the race, outpacing his competitors to win by 5 1/2 lengths from Golden Act, with nine lengths back to Screen King in third. His time of 1:54.2 was faster than that of Seattle Slew or Affirmed and by official time faster than Secretariat (though Secretariat's time in this race was disputed and in 2012 was changed to 1:53.0). When asked about the colt's prospects of winning the Triple Crown in the Belmont Stakes, Franklin claimed that "we're a cinch."

On the morning of the Belmont Stakes, a freak accident was discovered: Spectacular Bid had stepped on a safety pin. The pin had become embedded in his hoof, later leading to an infection that required the hoof to be drilled to cure the problem. However, after the discovery of the injury, Spectacular Bid did not seem lame and was entered into the race. Three days prior to the race, Franklin was fined after he engaged in a fist fight with Ángel Cordero Jr. in the jockeys' preparation room due to a dispute over an earlier race at Belmont. In the Belmont, Franklin rode Spectacular Bid aggressively early in the mile and a half race and went to the lead before halfway. Spectacular Bid held a clear lead entering the stretch but began to struggle and was overtaken by Coastal, who challenged along the inside rail. The favorite faded in the closing stages and lost second place to Golden Act near the finish. Some commentators speculated that Delp and Franklin had been intent on emulating Secretariat's performance in 1973 and that their tactics were intended to maximize the margin of victory. Delp, who had commented dismissively on Coastal's chances before the race, offered few excuses: "[Spectacular Bid] may not be a mile-and-a-half horse. The best horse won. I got beat, that's all. Tomorrow's another day." Franklin, who was replaced by Bill Shoemaker in Spectacular Bid's subsequent races, admitted that he had ridden a poorly judged race, explaining that he had very little experience of race-riding over long distances.

Spectacular Bid's failure to win the Belmont began a record-breaking drought: after Affirmed in 1978, no horse completed the Triple Crown until American Pharoah in 2015. Spectacular Bid and American Pharoah are also the last two 2-year-old champions to run in the Belmont with Triple Crowns on the line.

==== Post-triple crown racing ====
Following the Belmont Stakes, Spectacular Bid took two months off to recover from the injury. He returned to racing with Hall of Fame jockey Bill Shoemaker, who rode him through most of the remainder of his career. His first race back was in August 1979 in an allowance race at Delaware Park. He won by more than 17 lengths and set a new track record for 1 1/16 mi (1.7 km), 1:41.6. Spectacular Bid followed this performance with a win at the Marlboro Cup at Belmont Park, beating both horses he had lost to in the Belmont Stakes: Coastal and Golden Act. He was scheduled to race in the Marlboro against 1978 Triple Crown winner Affirmed, but Affirmed's owners bowed out of the race in reaction to a 133-pound impost assignment to Affirmed.

Spectacular Bid did meet Affirmed in the Jockey Club Gold Cup at Belmont in October, where he made repeated challenges and finished second to the Triple Crown winner. This was the last race Spectacular Bid lost, and the only time, apart from the Belmont, in which he raced over a mile and a half. He finished the year with one more race, the Meadowlands Cup, again setting a track record at 1 1/4 mi (2.0 km), 2:01.2. At the end of the year, he was unanimously awarded the title of Eclipse champion three-year-old colt for the year and was runner-up to Affirmed in the vote for Horse of the Year. His winnings for this year totalled US$1,279,333.

=== 1980: four-year-old season ===
As a four-year-old, Spectacular Bid started in nine races, winning them all for earnings of US$1,117,790. He set five track records at distances of 7, 8, and 10 furlongs, and twice at 9 furlongs (5,900 ft; 1,800 m).

His first three races were part of the "Strub Series", all held at the Santa Anita Park course that the late Charles H. Strub owned and built. Spectacular Bid carried 126 pounds in each race and defeated Flying Paster each time. The first race in the series was the Grade II Malibu Stakes at 7 furlong. Spectacular Bid ran the distance in 1:20, which stood as a track record for 27 years until Santa Anita removed its dirt track in favor of an artificial surface. Then he won the Grade II San Fernando Stakes, and finally, he won the Grade I Strub Stakes at 1 1/4 mi (2.0 km), running that distance the fastest ever on a dirt track, 1:57.8, and breaking a 30-year-old record of 1:58.2 set by Hall of Famer Noor carrying under 130 lb (59 kg) in 1950. As of 2020, Spectacular Bid's time still stands as the world record on a dirt track.

Spectacular Bid also won the Grade I Santa Anita Handicap (carrying 130 lbs) on a sloppy track March 2. Then he moved to Hollywood Park Racetrack, where he won the Mervyn Leroy Handicap carrying 132 lbs on May 18 and the Grade I Californian Stakes, carrying 130 lbs in a track record time of 1:45.8. He then shipped to Arlington Park to win the Grade III Washington Park Handicap by ten lengths under 130 lbs. His time of 1:46.2 for 1 1/8 mi (1.8 km) broke the track record, which had been jointly held by Damascus. Then it was on to Monmouth Park for the Grade I Monmouth Handicap, which he won under 132 lbs, defeating champion filly Glorious Song. Delp caused some controversy by withdrawing Spectacular Bid from the Marlboro Cup after the horse was assigned a weight of 136 lbs.

Spectacular Bid concluded his career with a walkover in the Woodward Stakes on September 20, 1980, at Belmont, covering the 1 1/4 mi (2.0 km) in 2:02.4. A plan to race in the Jockey Club Gold Cup was aborted on the day of the race when an injury to the horse's left front ankle flared up. Delp thereafter announced Spectacular Bid's retirement.

During his final year, Spectacular Bid compiled then-record earnings of US$2,781,607 and was named American Champion Older Male Horse and Horse of the Year. In the voting for the latter award, he received 181 of the 200 votes, beating Genuine Risk (14 votes), Temperence Hill (4) and John Henry (1). His full race record is listed below.

Date	Racecourse	Distance	Race	Jockey	Weight	Odds	Field	Result	Time	Margin
03 Jun 78	Pimlico	5 1/2 furlongs (3,630 ft; 1,106 m)	Maiden Special	R J Franklin	8-3	13/2	11	1st	1-04.6	3 1/4 lengths
22 Jul 78	Pimlico	5 1/2 furlongs (3,630 ft; 1,106 m)	Allowance	R J Franklin	8-3	3/10f	5	1st	1-04.2	8 lengths
02 Aug 78	Monmouth Park	5 1/2 furlongs (3,630 ft; 1,106 m)	Tyro Stakes	R J Franklin	8-6	7/4f	8	4th	1-04.8	6 3/4 lengths
20 Aug 78	Delaware Park	6 furlongs (3,960 ft; 1,207 m)	Dover Stakes	R J Franklin	8-0	1/1f	7	2nd	1-10.8	2 1/2 lengths
23 Sep 78	Atlantic City	7 furlongs (4,620 ft; 1,408 m)	World's Playground S. G3	R J Franklin	8-2	5/1	7	1st	1-20.8	15 lengths
08 Oct 78	Belmont Park	8 furlongs (5,280 ft; 1,609 m)	Champagne Stakes G1	J Velasquez	8-10	12/5	6	1st	1-34.8	2 3/4 lengths
19 Oct 78	Meadowlands	8 1/2 furlongs (5,610 ft; 1,710 m)	Young America Stakes	J Velasquez	8-10	3/10f	9	1st	1-43.2	Neck
28 Oct 78	Laurel Park	8 1/2 furlongs (5,610 ft; 1,710 m)	Laurel Futurity G1	R J Franklin	8-10	9/10f	4	1st	1-41.6	8 1/2 lengths
11 Nov 78	Keystone	8 1/2 furlongs (5,610 ft; 1,710 m)	Heritage Stakes G2	R J Franklin	8-10	1/10f	7	1st	1-42.0	6 lengths
07 Feb 79	Gulfstream Park	7 furlongs (4,620 ft; 1,408 m)	Hutcheson Stakes	R J Franklin	8-10	1/20f	4	1st	1-21.4	3 3/4 lengths
19 Feb 79	Gulfstream Park	8 1/2 furlongs (5,610 ft; 1,710 m)	Fountain Of Youth S. G3	R J Franklin	8-10	1/10f	6	1st	1-41.2	8 1/2 lengths
06 Mar 79	Gulfstream Park	9 furlongs (5,940 ft; 1,811 m)	Florida Derby G1	R J Franklin	8-10	1/2f	7	1st	1-48.8	4 1/2 lengths
24 Mar 79	Hialeah Park	9 furlongs (5,940 ft; 1,811 m)	Flamingo Stakes G1	R J Franklin	8-10	1/20f	8	1st	1-48.4	12 lengths
26 Apr 79	Keeneland	9 furlongs (5,940 ft; 1,811 m)	Blue Grass Stakes G1	R J Franklin	8-9	1/20f	4	1st	1-50.0	7 lengths
5 May 79	Churchill Downs	10 furlongs (6,600 ft; 2,012 m)	Kentucky Derby G1	R J Franklin	9-0	3/5f	10	1st	2-02.4	2 3/4 lengths
19 May 79	Pimlico	9 1/2 furlongs (6,270 ft; 1,911 m)	Preakness Stakes G1	R J Franklin	9-0	1/10f	5	1st	1-54.2	5 1/2 lengths
09 Jun 79	Belmont Park	12 furlongs (7,920 ft; 2,414 m)	Belmont Stakes G1	R J Franklin	9-0	3/10f	8	3rd	2-28.6	3 1/2 lengths
26 Aug 79	Delaware Park	8 1/2 furlongs (5,610 ft; 1,710 m)	Allowance	W Shoemaker	8-10	1/20f	5	1st	1-41.6	17 lengths
08 Sep 79	Belmont Park	9 furlongs (5,940 ft; 1,811 m)	Marlboro Cup (H'cap) G1	W Shoemaker	8-12	1/2f	6	1st	1-46.6	5 lengths
06 Oct 79	Belmont Park	12 furlongs (7,920 ft; 2,414 m)	Jockey Clup Gold Cup G1	W Shoemaker	8-9	7/5	4	2nd	2-27.4	3/4 length
18 Oct 79	Meadowlands	10 furlongs (6,600 ft; 2,012 m)	Meadowlands Cup G2	W Shoemaker	9-0	1/10f	5	1st	2-01.2	3 lengths
05 Jan 80	Santa Anita	7 furlongs (4,620 ft; 1,408 m)	Malibu Stakes G2	W Shoemaker	9-0	3/10f	5	1st	1-20.0	5 lengths
19 Jan 80	Santa Anita	9 furlongs (5,940 ft; 1,811 m)	San Fernando Stakes G2	W Shoemaker	9-0	1/20f	4	1st	1-48.0	1 1/2 lengths
03 Feb 80	Santa Anita	10 furlongs (6,600 ft; 2,012 m)	Charles H Strub S. G1	W Shoemaker	9-0	3/10f	4	1st	1-57.8	3 1/4 lengths
02 Mar 80	Santa Anita	10 furlongs (6,600 ft; 2,012 m)	Santa Anita Handicap G1	W Shoemaker	9-4	3/10f	4	1st	2-00.6	5 lengths
18 May 80	Hollywood Park	8 1/2 furlongs (5,610 ft; 1,710 m)	Mervyn Leroy Handicap G2	W Shoemaker	9-6	1/5f	5	1st	1-40.4	7 lengths
08 Jun 80	Hollywood Park	9 furlongs (5,940 ft; 1,811 m)	Californian Stakes G1	W Shoemaker	9-4	1/20f	7	1st	1-45.8	4 1/4 lengths
19 Jul 80	Arlington	9 furlongs (5,940 ft; 1,811 m)	Washington Park H'cap G3	W Shoemaker	9-4	1/20f	6	1st	1-46.2	10 lengths
16 Aug 80	Monmouth Park	9 furlongs (5,940 ft; 1,811 m)	Haskell Handicap G1	W Shoemaker	9-6	1/10f	8	1st	1-48.0	1 3/4 lengths
20 Sep 80	Belmont Park	9 furlongs (5,940 ft; 1,811 m)	Woodward Stakes G1	W Shoemaker	9-0	No SP	1	1st	2-02.4	Walkover

== Stud record ==
Following his last race, Spectacular Bid was syndicated for a then-record US$22 million and put to stud at Claiborne Farm in Kentucky, where his initial stud fee was US$150,000. He made a promising start to his breeding career, but his later record was disappointing. The quality of mares he attracted fell, and his stud fees declined over the years. He was eventually sold and moved in 1991 to Milfer Farms in Unadilla, New York, where he lived out the remainder of his years, continuing to attract visits and letters from admirers. He was never pensioned from stud duty, covering ten mares at a fee of $3,500 in the last year of his life.

Spectacular Bid was sent to stud at Claiborne Farm, which is where Secretariat was also sent to stud. Secretariat's paddock at Claiborne Farm bordered three other stallions: Drone, Sir Ivor, and Spectacular Bid. Secretariat did not pay much attention to Drone or Sir Ivor, but he and Spectacular Bid became friendly and occasionally raced each other along the fence line between their paddocks.

Spectacular Bid sired 253 winners, including 47 stakes winners that won more than US$19 million. His most notable progeny include: Bite the Bullet (19 starts 5-4-2 for US$216,809; sire of 19 SW in Australia), Spectacular Love (won G1 Belmont Futurity Stakes), Spectacular Sue, Maison Close, Lay Down, Festivity, Spectacular Joke, Princess Pietrina, Lotus Pool, Esprit d'Etoile, Legal Bid and Sweettuc. At the time of his death, his daughters had produced 69 stakes winners, including the European Champion Sprinter Mozart.

Spectacular Bid died from a heart attack on June 9, 2003, and was buried at Milfer Farms. At the time of his death, he was the oldest living winner of the Kentucky Derby and the Preakness Stakes.

== Honors ==
The Blood-Horse magazine ranked Spectacular Bid at #10 in the Top 100 U.S. Thoroughbred champions of the 20th Century. He was inducted into the National Museum of Racing and Hall of Fame in 1982. In their book A Century of Champions, based on the Timeform rating system, John Randall and Tony Morris ranked him as the third best North American horse of the 20th century (behind Secretariat and Citation) and the ninth best in their global ranking.

The Los Angeles Times quoted jockey Bill Shoemaker as saying that Spectacular Bid was the best horse he ever rode.

== Pedigree ==
Pedigree of Spectacular Bid (USA), gray stallion, 1976
Sire Bold Bidder (USA) 1962	Bold Ruler (USA); 1954	Nasrullah	Nearco
Sire Bold Bidder (USA) 1962	Bold Ruler (USA); 1954	Nasrullah	Mumtaz Begum
Sire Bold Bidder (USA) 1962	Bold Ruler (USA); 1954	Miss Disco	Discovery
Sire Bold Bidder (USA) 1962	Bold Ruler (USA); 1954	Miss Disco	Outdone
Sire Bold Bidder (USA) 1962	High Bid (USA); 1956	To Market	Market Wise
Sire Bold Bidder (USA) 1962	High Bid (USA); 1956	To Market	Pretty Does
Sire Bold Bidder (USA) 1962	High Bid (USA); 1956	Stepping Stone	Princequillo
Sire Bold Bidder (USA) 1962	High Bid (USA); 1956	Stepping Stone	Step Across
Dam Spectacular (USA) 1960	Promised Land (USA); 1954	Palestinian	Sun Again
Dam Spectacular (USA) 1960	Promised Land (USA); 1954	Palestinian	Dolly Whisk
Dam Spectacular (USA) 1960	Promised Land (USA); 1954	Mahmoudess	Mahmoud
Dam Spectacular (USA) 1960	Promised Land (USA); 1954	Mahmoudess	Forever Yours
Dam Spectacular (USA) 1960	Stop On Red (USA); 1959	To Market	Market Wise
Dam Spectacular (USA) 1960	Stop On Red (USA); 1959	To Market	Pretty Does
Dam Spectacular (USA) 1960	Stop On Red (USA); 1959	Danger Ahead	Head Play
Dam Spectacular (USA) 1960	Stop On Red (USA); 1959	Danger Ahead	Lady Beware (Family 2-d)

- Spectacular Bid was inbred 3 × 3 to To Market, meaning that this stallion appears twice in the third generation of his pedigree.

== See also ==
- List of leading Thoroughbred racehorses
- List of racehorses
- Spectacular Bid- The Eastern Shore Horse
