= Dogwood Stable =

Thoroughbred racehorse partnership

Dogwood Stable was an American Thoroughbred racehorse partnership. Founded by W. Cothran "Cot" Campbell in 1969, Dogwood was widely viewed to have introduced the concept of group thoroughbred ownership in the United States by offering shares in a racehorse to multiple individuals. Campbell estimated that more than 1,200 individuals had taken part as members of the stable.

Dogwood Stable won the Alcibiades Stakes at Keeneland in 1971 with Mrs. Cornwallis, and opened a farm in Greenville, Georgia two years later. In 1986, the farm was moved to a new location in Aiken, South Carolina.

In 1990, their colt Summer Squall won the second leg of the U.S. Triple Crown series, the Preakness Stakes. In 2013, they won the Belmont Stakes with the colt Palace Malice.

Successful Dogwood Stable runners include Nassipour, Southjet, Smok'n Frolic, and Limehouse. The partnership has also raced two Eclipse Award champions: Storm Song, who won the 1996 Breeders' Cup Juvenile Fillies and was voted Champion Two-Year-Old Filly, and 1987 Steeplechase Horse of the Year Inlander.

Following Palace Malice's win in the 2013 Belmont, Dogwood Stable's operations were merged into Aron Wellman's Eclipse Thoroughbred Partners. Dogwood Stable founder Cot Campbell died in October 2018, a few months after he was inducted into the National Museum of Racing and Hall of Fame as a Pillar of the Turf for his contributions to thoroughbred racing.

The final horse to race under the Dogwood colors was Pipes, who placed in the Damon Runyon Stakes and Gander Stakes before being claimed for $30,000 out of a race at Saratoga in September 2019. In February 2021 the previous partnership at Dogwood, by way of trainer Mike Trombetta, claimed Pipes for $5,000 out of a race at Laurel and retired the horse to Equine Rescue of Aiken.

== See also ==
- Dogwood Dominion Award
