= Flying Paster =

American-bred Thoroughbred racehorse

- Sire: Gummo
- Grandsire: Fleet Nasrullah
- Dam: Procne
- Damsire: Acroterion
- Sex: Stallion
- Foaled: 1976
- Country: United States
- Colour: Bay
- Breeder: Bernard J. Ridder
- Owner: Bernard J. Ridder
- Trainer: Gordon C. Campbell
- Record: 27: 13-7-2
- Earnings: $1,127,460

Major wins
- Balboa Stakes (1978); California Breeders' Champion Stakes (1978); Del Mar Futurity (1978); Norfolk Stakes (1978); Sunny Slope Stakes (1978); San Vicente Stakes (1979); Santa Anita Derby (1979); Hollywood Derby (1979); San Pasqual Handicap (1981); San Carlos Handicap (1981); San Antonio Handicap (1981)

Awards
- California Horse of the Year (1978); Leading sire in California (1987-1991)
- Last updated on May 31, 2007

Flying Paster (1976–1992) was an American Thoroughbred racehorse.

== Background ==
Flying Paster was bred in California by his owner, Bernard J. Ridder of the Knight Ridder newspaper chain, and was named for a printing process mechanism.

== Racing career ==
An outstanding racehorse, Flying Paster was foaled in the same year as Spectacular Bid, a future U.S. Racing Hall of Fame inductee and a horse that The Blood-Horse magazine rated as America's 10th best horse of the 20th Century. Ridden by Don Pierce, in 1978 Flying Paster was the dominant two-year-old on the U.S. West Coast, winning six stakes races, usually with a powerful stretch drive. He became the first 2-year-old to be voted California Horse of the Year.

With Pierce in the saddle to start his three-year-old campaign, Flying Paster won February's San Vicente Stakes, was third in the March San Felipe Stakes, then captured the West Coast's most important race for three-year-olds, the Santa Anita Derby, then captured the Hollywood Derby by 10 lengths. Sent to the Kentucky Derby, Flying Paster was the second choice among bettors behind the heavily favored Spectacular Bid. However, the colt suffered a cut in his right foreleg during the race and finished fifth. After tying the Pimlico track record for the first quarter, Flying Paster finished a distant fourth in the Preakness Stakes. He did not run in the third and final leg of the Triple Crown series, the 1½ mile Belmont Stakes.

Racing at age four, in 1980 Flying Paster finished second four times to Spectacular Bid, including in the Grade I Santa Anita Handicap. Ridden by Chris McCarron in 1981, he started the year with wins in the San Pasqual and San Carlos Handicaps, then made it three in a row by capturing the San Antonio Handicap.

== Stud record ==
Retired to stud duty, Flying Paster sired 48 stakes winners and was California's leading sire from 1987 through 1991. His progeny included Grade I winner Cats Cradle and the Jack Kent Cooke-owned California Champion Flying Continental, whose wins included the Jockey Club Gold Cup. The 2015 U.S. Triple Crown winner, American Pharoah, is a fourth-generation descendant.

At the pinnacle of his breeding career, Flying Paster died unexpectedly at age sixteen from a heart attack on August 22, 1992, at Cardiff Stud Farm in Creston, California.

== Pedigree ==
Pedigree of Flying Paster, bay stallion, 1976
Sire Gummo	Fleet Nasrullah	Nasrullah	Nearco
Sire Gummo	Fleet Nasrullah	Nasrullah	Mumtaz Begum
Sire Gummo	Fleet Nasrullah	Happy Go Fleet	Count Fleet
Sire Gummo	Fleet Nasrullah	Happy Go Fleet	Draeh
Sire Gummo	Alabama Gal	Determine	Alibhai
Sire Gummo	Alabama Gal	Determine	Koubis
Sire Gummo	Alabama Gal	Trojan Lass	Priam
Sire Gummo	Alabama Gal	Trojan Lass	Rompers
Dam Procne	Acroterion	Hillsdale	Take Away
Dam Procne	Acroterion	Hillsdale	Johann
Dam Procne	Acroterion	Stage Fright	Native Dancer
Dam Procne	Acroterion	Stage Fright	Petrify
Dam Procne	Philomela	Tudor Minstrel	Owen Tudor
Dam Procne	Philomela	Tudor Minstrel	Sansonnet
Dam Procne	Philomela	Petrovna	Blue Peter
Dam Procne	Philomela	Petrovna	Straight Sequence (family: 22)
