= General Assembly (horse) =

American-bred Thoroughbred racehorse

- Sire: Secretariat
- Grandsire: Bold Ruler
- Dam: Exclusive Dancer
- Damsire: Native Dancer
- Sex: Stallion
- Foaled: 1976
- Country: United States
- Color: Chestnut
- Breeder: Bertram and Diana Firestone
- Owner: Bertram R. Firestone
- Trainer: LeRoy Jolley
- Record: 17: 7–6–1
- Earnings: $463,245

Major wins
- Hopeful Stakes (1978); Saratoga Special Stakes (1978); Gotham Stakes (1979); Vosburgh Stakes (1979); Travers Stakes (1979); American Classic Race placing: Kentucky Derby 2nd (1979)

General Assembly (1976–2005) was an American Thoroughbred racehorse. He was bred and raced by the prominent husband-and-wife team of Bertram and Diana Firestone, of Upperville, Virginia. He was sired by the 1973 U.S. Triple Crown champion Secretariat, out of the mare Exclusive Dancer, daughter of Native Dancer.

General Assembly was trained by future U.S. Racing Hall of Fame inductee LeRoy Jolley. At age two, the colt won the Hopeful Stakes and the Saratoga Special Stakes; he ran second to Spectacular Bid in both the Champagne Stakes and the Laurel Futurity.

Racing at age three in 1979, in the U.S. Triple Crown series General Assembly ran second in the Kentucky Derby and fifth in the Preakness Stakes to winner Spectacular Bid. In the Belmont Stakes, he finished seventh behind upset winner Coastal. General Assembly won the Vosburgh Stakes and ran second again to Spectacular Bid in the Marlboro Cup Invitational Handicap. He then earned the most important victory of his career with a 15-length win in the Travers Stakes, in which he set a Saratoga track record for the mile and a quarter which stood until 2016.

== As a sire ==
General Assembly was retired to stud duty beginning in 1980 at his owner's breeding operation in County Kildare, Ireland. In 1986 he returned to the United States to stand in Kentucky; in 1993 was sent to breeders in France, and in 1995 to a German breeding farm. Although General Assembly was never the successful stallion his regal bloodline promised, he sired 31 stakes-race winners. One of his best-known offspring was Steady Flame, who raced at two in Ireland and then was sent to Hong Kong and changed the name into Quicken Away; there he won the Hong Kong Champions & Chater Cup, was a champion sprinter in 1989-91 and champion older miler in 1990 and Presidium.

His stud farm, Gestüt Olympia in Alpen, Germany announced that the 29-year-old General Assembly had been euthanized in March 2005 due to heart and circulatory problems.

Bloodline: Discovery (1931–1958) was a champion American Thoroughbred racehorse. Discovery was inducted into the U.S. Racing Hall of Fame in 1969. The National Museum of Racing and Hall of Fame said that he was "considered one of the greatest horses of the 20th century." Discovery won 27 races from 1933 to 1936. As the chart below shows, the pedigree of the champion racehorse General Assembly includes two lines from Discovery. Discovery was an ancestor of both Secretariat and Exclusive Dancer. One line goes from Discovery to Miss Disco 1944 to Bold Ruler 1954 to Sire (father), Secretariat 1970. The other line goes from Discovery to Geisha 1943 to Native Dancer 1950 to Dam (mother), Exclusive Dancer 1967.

== Pedigree ==
Pedigree of General Assembly, chestnut stallion, April 30, 1976
Sire Secretariat ch. 1970	Bold Ruler dkb/br. 1954	Nasrullah b. 1940	Nearco
Sire Secretariat ch. 1970	Bold Ruler dkb/br. 1954	Nasrullah b. 1940	Mumtaz Begum
Sire Secretariat ch. 1970	Bold Ruler dkb/br. 1954	Miss Disco b. 1944	Discovery
Sire Secretariat ch. 1970	Bold Ruler dkb/br. 1954	Miss Disco b. 1944	Outdone
Sire Secretariat ch. 1970	Somethingroyal b. 1952	Princequillo b. 1940	Prince Rose
Sire Secretariat ch. 1970	Somethingroyal b. 1952	Princequillo b. 1940	Cosquilla
Sire Secretariat ch. 1970	Somethingroyal b. 1952	Imperatrice dkb/br. 1938	Caruso
Sire Secretariat ch. 1970	Somethingroyal b. 1952	Imperatrice dkb/br. 1938	Cinquepace
Dam Exclusive Dancer gr. 1967	Native Dancer gr. 1950	Polynesian br. 1942	Unbreakable
Dam Exclusive Dancer gr. 1967	Native Dancer gr. 1950	Polynesian br. 1942	Black Polly
Dam Exclusive Dancer gr. 1967	Native Dancer gr. 1950	Geisha gr. 1943	Discovery
Dam Exclusive Dancer gr. 1967	Native Dancer gr. 1950	Geisha gr. 1943	Miyako
Dam Exclusive Dancer gr. 1967	Exclusive ch. 1953	Shut Out ch. 1939	Equipoise
Dam Exclusive Dancer gr. 1967	Exclusive ch. 1953	Shut Out ch. 1939	Goose Egg
Dam Exclusive Dancer gr. 1967	Exclusive ch. 1953	Good Example br. 1944	Pilate
Dam Exclusive Dancer gr. 1967	Exclusive ch. 1953	Good Example br. 1944	Parade Girl (Family: 10-a)
