= Swale (horse) =

American-bred Thoroughbred racehorse

- Swale's grave at Claiborne Farm
- Sire: Seattle Slew
- Grandsire: Bold Reasoning
- Dam: Tuerta
- Damsire: Forli
- Sex: Colt
- Foaled: April 21, 1981
- Died: June 17, 1984 (aged 3)
- Country: United States
- Colour: Dark Bay/Brown
- Breeder: Claiborne Farm
- Owner: Claiborne Farm; Silks: Yellow, Yellow Cap
- Trainer: Woody Stephens
- Record: 14: 9-2-2
- Earnings: $1,583,660

Major wins
- Breeders' Futurity Stakes (1983); Belmont Futurity Stakes (1983); Saratoga Special Stakes (1983); Young America Stakes (1983); Hutcheson Stakes (1984); Florida Derby (1984); Triple Crown race wins: Kentucky Derby (1984); Belmont Stakes (1984)

Awards
- U.S. Champion 3-Yr-Old Colt (1984)

Honours
- Aiken Thoroughbred Racing Hall of Fame (1985); Swale Stakes at Gulfstream Park

Swale (April 21, 1981 – June 17, 1984) was an American thoroughbred racehorse. He is best known for winning the Kentucky Derby and the Belmont Stakes in 1984. He died eight days after his win in the latter race.

== Background ==
A son of the 1977 Triple Crown winner Seattle Slew, Swale was trained by Woody Stephens and ridden by Laffit Pincay, Jr., both now members of the National Museum of Racing and Hall of Fame. Swale's dam, the stakes winning mare Tuerta, was born with one eye. Her name means "one-eyed" in Spanish.

== Racing career ==
=== 1983: two-year-old season ===
At 2, Swale broke his maiden at Belmont Park on July 21, 1983. Next out, he was entered in the Saratoga Special Stakes, and in the muddy going at Saratoga Race Course, won the race with jockey Eddie Maple. After finishing third in the Hopeful Stakes at Saratoga, Swale went undefeated the remainder of his two-year-old campaign, with wins in the Belmont Futurity Stakes, Breeders' Futurity Stakes, and Young America Stakes.

=== 1984: three-year-old season ===
At 3, Swale won the Hutcheson Stakes at Gulfstream Park by seven lengths first out. After displacing his palate in the Fountain of Youth Stakes, where he finished third, he won the Florida Derby with new rider Laffit Pincay, Jr., running the mile and one-eighth in 1:47 3/5 as he drew away from favored Dr. Carter at the end. After being upset in the sloppy going at Keeneland Race Course in the Lexington Stakes when second, Swale won the Kentucky Derby at historic Churchill Downs.

The day before departing for Baltimore for the Preakness Stakes, Swale worked seven furlongs in 1:24, galloping out the mile in 1:37 1/5 at Churchill Downs, then shipped to Baltimore on Monday and worked a half-mile in a swift :46, galloping out five furlongs in :59 3/5 two days before the big race. That Saturday he ran an uncharacteristic seventh in the Preakness Stakes. Swale came back to win the longest and most gruelling of the U.S. Triple Crown races, the Belmont Stakes.

== Death ==
On June 17, 1984, eight days after the Belmont Stakes, Swale collapsed and died on route to his stall following a bath. He was buried at Claiborne Farm. "A statement issued by the New Bolton Center of the University of Pennsylvania's School of Veterinary Science, where extended tests had been run on samples and organs from Swale's body, said that an area of fibrosis on his heart had been discovered in recent days. The statement said that Dr. Helen Acland, the center's head pathologist, had "found a very small area of fibrosis" below the aortic valve and that "lesions of this type can produce an arrhythmia in the heart, which can be fatal." The investigation into the cause of death of the racehorse Swale inspired the SWALE explanation-based learning system which detects and explains anomalies in horses.

== Honors and awards ==
Swale posthumously received the Eclipse Award for Outstanding Three-Year-Old Male Horse for 1984. He earned $1,583,660 during his two-year racing career.

The Swale Stakes, an annual Grade II stakes race for three-year-olds at Gulfstream Park in Hallandale, Florida, was named in his honor.

== Pedigree ==
Pedigree of Swale (USA), bay or brown colt 1981
Sire Seattle Slew	Bold Reasoning	Boldnesian	Bold Ruler
Sire Seattle Slew	Bold Reasoning	Boldnesian	Alanesian
Sire Seattle Slew	Bold Reasoning	Reason To Earn	Hail To Reason
Sire Seattle Slew	Bold Reasoning	Reason To Earn	Sailing Home
Sire Seattle Slew	My Charmer	Poker	Round Table
Sire Seattle Slew	My Charmer	Poker	Glamour
Sire Seattle Slew	My Charmer	Fair Charmer	Jet Action
Sire Seattle Slew	My Charmer	Fair Charmer	Myrtle Charm
Dam Tuerta	Forli	Aristophanes	Hyperion
Dam Tuerta	Forli	Aristophanes	Commotion
Dam Tuerta	Forli	Trevisa	Advocate
Dam Tuerta	Forli	Trevisa	Veneta
Dam Tuerta	Continue	Double Jay	Balladier
Dam Tuerta	Continue	Double Jay	Broomshot
Dam Tuerta	Continue	Courtesy	Nasrullah
Dam Tuerta	Continue	Courtesy	Highway Code

== See also ==
- List of racehorses
