= List of leading Thoroughbred racehorses =

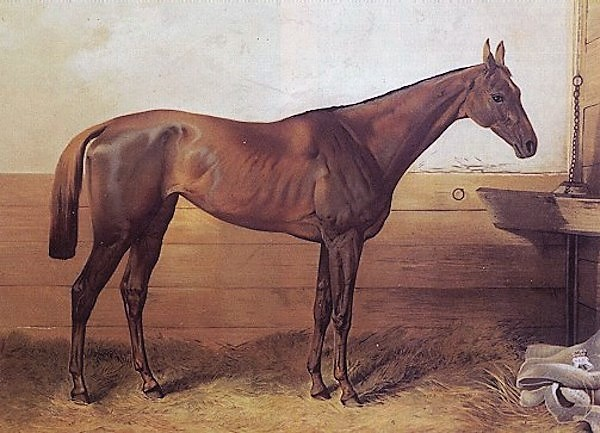
Kincsem, Ch.m. 1874, undefeated winner in 54 starts in five countries

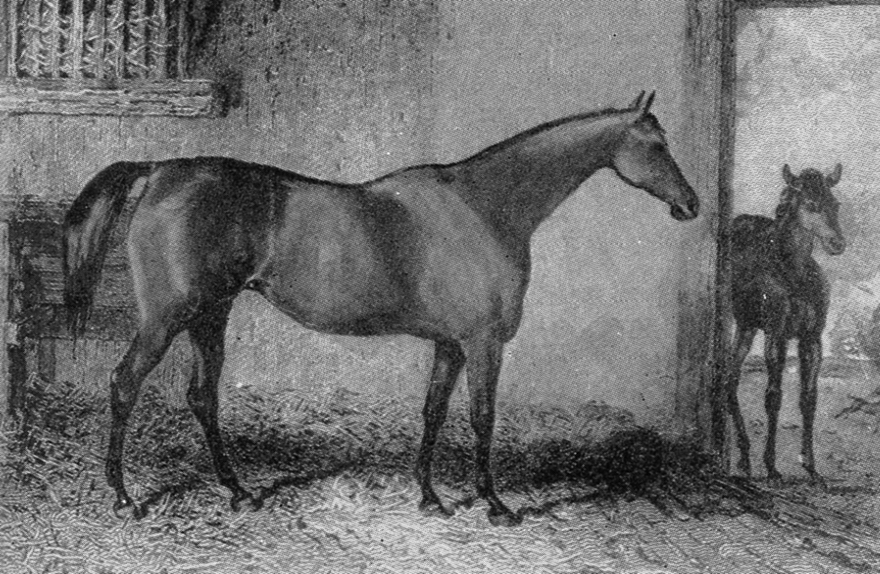
Cobweb was an undefeated winner of the 1,000 Guineas and Epsom Oaks.

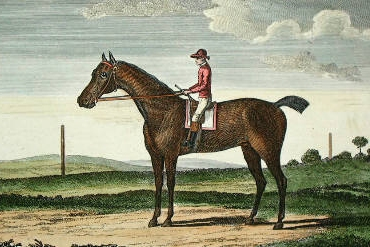
Undefeated: Goldfinder, b.c. 1764 (Snap – mare, by Blank)

This list of leading Thoroughbred racehorses contains the names of undefeated racehorses and other horses that had an outstanding race record in specific categories. Note though that many champions do not appear on the list as an unexpected defeat may be caused by many factors such as injury, illness, going, racing tactics and differences in weight carried, the latter being particularly significant in North America and Australia where handicaps are common even at the highest level of racing.

It is common to compare racehorses on multiple factors such as their overall race record, the quality of the horses they beat and the brilliance of their wins. Comparison of raw times is generally unreliable between horses of different eras or even over different racecourses due to a variety of factors such as the racing surface and the pace at which the race is run. Timeform ratings, introduced in 1948, and Beyer Speed Figures, introduced in the United States in 1992, are relatively recent attempts to compensate for such variables. Thoroughbred Winning Brew holds the Guinness world record for the fastest speed from the starting gate for a Thoroughbred racehorse, at 70.76 km/h (43.97 mph) over two furlongs, although Quarter Horses attain higher speeds over shorter distances than Thoroughbreds. Such speeds may also be achieved by elite racehorses during the stretch drive.

The two main forms of Thoroughbred horseracing are flat racing and hurdle or steeplechase (jumping) races over obstacles. Jumpers tend to be older than their flat racing counterparts and can have much longer careers, making it possible to earn a large number of wins. For example, champion hurdler Hurricane Fly won a then-record 22 Grade One races over his ten-year career.

Most race horses and race winners are male horses (either intact males or geldings). While male and female horses do not exhibit sexual dimorphism as obviously as human athletes, male horses are considered more aggressive racers and generally have a significant competitive advantage. At the highest level of racing though, intact males have great economic value at stud, so they are often retired after only a few years of racing. In part because they may have longer racing careers, some of the most winning racehorses of all time are females, including Kincsem, Black Caviar, Winx, and Zenyatta.

== Undefeated horses ==
Below is a list of Thoroughbred racehorses with an undefeated race record. The list is not comprehensive for otherwise unnotable horses with five or fewer starts.

Wins	Horse	Bred	Details	Foaled	Pedigree and notes
54	Kincsem	Hungary	Ch.m.	1874	Cambuscan x Water Nymph by Cotswold
25	Black Caviar	Australia	Br.m.	2006	Bel Esprit x Helsinge by Desert Sun
19	Peppers Pride	United States	B.f.	2003	Desert God x Lady Pepper by Chili Pepper Pie
18	Eclipse	Great Britain	Ch.c.	1764	Marske x Spilletta by Regulus
18	Karayel	Turkey	B.h.	1970	Prince Tudor x Linda by Cihangir. Triple Crown winner.
16	Ormonde	Great Britain	B.c.	1883	Bend Or x Lily Agnes by Macaroni. Triple Crown winner.
16	Prestige	France	b c	1903	Le Pompon x Orgueilleuse by Révérand
16	Ribot	Italy	B.c.	1952	Tenerani x Romanella by El Greco
15	Colin	United States	Br.c.	1905	Commando x Pastorella by Springfield
15	Macón	Argentina	B.c.	1922	Sandal x Bourgogne by Your Majesty
15	Tsurumaru Sunday	Japan	B.g.	1995	Sunday Silence x Tsurumaru Beppin by Sanei Tholan
14	Frankel	Great Britain	B.c.	2008	Galileo x Kind by Danehill
14	Highflyer	Great Britain	B.c.	1774	Herod x Rachel by Blank
14	Nearco	Italy	Br.c.	1935	Pharos x Nogara by Havresac
13	Barcaldine	Great Britain	B.c.	1878	Solon x Ballyroe by Belladrum
13	Personal Ensign	United States	B.f.	1984	Private Account x Grecian Banner by Hoist The Flag
13	Tremont	United States	B.c.	1884	Virgil x Ann Fief by Alarm
12	Ardrossan	Great Britain	B.c.	1809	John Bull x Miss Whip by Volunteer
12	Asteroid	United States	B.c.	1861	Lexington x Nebula by Glencoe (GB)
12	Braque	Italy	B.h.	1954	Antonio Canale x Buonamica by Niccolò dell'Arca
12	Crucifix	Great Britain	B.f.	1837	Priam x Octaviana by Octavian
11	Goldfinder	Great Britain	B.c.	1764	Snap x mare by Blank
11	Kurifuji (Toshifuji)	Japan	Ch.f.	1940	Tournesol x Kenfuji by Chapel Brampton
11	Pedro Caimán	Venezuela	B.h	2011	Harlan's Holiday x Black Eyed Lady by Carson City
10	Freire	Chile	Ch.h.	1927	El Tango x Filibus by Eclair
10	Handsomchamp	United States	Gr./r h.	2002	Fabulous Champ x Holly D by Hey Rob
10	Nereide	Germany	B.f.	1933	Laland x Nella da Gabbio by Grand Parade
10	Tokino Minoru	Japan	B.c.	1948	Theft x Daini Tyrant's Queen by Soldennis
9	Bahram	Great Britain	B.c.	1932	Blandford x Friar's Daughter by Friar Marcus Triple Crown winner.
9	Combat	Great Britain	Br.c.	1944	Big Game x Commotion by Mieuxce
9	Grand Flaneur	Australia	B.c.	1877	Yattendon x First Lady by St. Albans
9	Moscona	Chile	B.f.	1986	Mocito Guapo x Chispita by Chairman Walker
9	Patience	Hungary	Ch.f.	1902	Bona Vista x Podagra by Galopin
9	Regulus	Great Britain	B.c.	1739	Godolphin Arabian x Grey Robinson by Bald Galloway
9	St. Simon	Great Britain	B.c.	1881	Galopin x St. Angela by King Tom
8	Alipes	Great Britain	Br/b. f.	1757	Regulus x Lusty by Locust
8	American Eclipse	United States	Ch.c.	1814	Duroc x Miller's Damsel by Messenger
8	Bullets Fever	United States	Gr.c.	2013	Fiber Sonde x Ghost Canyon by Indian Charlie
8	Caracalla	France	B.c	1942	Tourbillon x Astronomie by Asterus
8	La Cressonniere	France	B.f.	2013	Le Havre x Absolute Lady by Galileo
8	Maruzensky	Japan	B. c.	1974	Nijinsky II x Shill by Buckpasser
8	Rare Brick	United States	Blk.c.	1983	Rare Performer x Windy Brick by Mr. Brick
8	Sensations	United States	Br.c.	1877	Leamington x Susan Beane by Lexington
8	Sweetbriar	Great Britain	Ch. c	1769	Syphon x mare (1763) by Shakespeare
8	Tiffin	Great Britain	B. f.	1926	Tetratema x Dawn-wind by Sunstar
7	Cluster of Stars	United States	B.f.	2009	Greely's Galaxy x Babyurthegreatest by Honour and Glory
7	El Rio Rey	United States	B.h.	1887	Norfolk x Marian by Malcolm
7	Fain	Argentina	B.h.	1982	Dancing Moss x Fallow's Sister by Worden
7	Itajara	Brazil	Br.c.	1983	Felicio x Apple Honey by Falkland
7	Kitano Daio	Japan	Ch.c.	1965	Die Hard x Kitano Hikari by Tosa Midori
7	Malt Queen	Australia	Br.f.	1905	Maltster x Her Majesty by Sunrise
7	Mannamead	Great Britain	B.h.	1929	Manna x Pinprick by Torpoint
7	Monarch	United States	B.c.	1834	Priam x Delphine by Whisker
7	Perdita II	Great Britain	B.m.	1881	Hampton x Hermione by Young Melbourne
7	Rodolph	United States	B.c.	1831	Sir Archy Montorio or Sir Archy x Haxall's Moses Mare by Haxall's Moses
7	Salvator	France	Ch.c.	1872	Dollar x Sauvagine by Ion
7	Viani	Italy	B.c.	1967	Acropolis x Violante Vanni by Yorick
7	The Tetrarch	Ireland	Gr.c.	1911	Roi Herode x Vahren by Bona Vista
7	Zarkava	Ireland	B.f.	2005	Zamindar x Zarkasha by Kahyasi
6	Ace Impact	Ireland	B.c.	2020	Cracksman x Absolutly Me by Anabaa Blue
6	Aldford	Great Britain	Br.c.	1911	Mauvezin x Mangalmi by William the Third
6	Albany Girl	Great Britain	Ch.f.	1935	Duncan Gray x Vestalia by Abbot's Trace
6	Amianto	Argentina	Ch.h.	1888	Zanoni x Mariana by Chivalrous
6	Bay Middleton	Great Britain	B.c.	1833	Sultan x Cobweb by Phantom
6	Bow Echo	Ireland	B.c.	2023	Night of Thunder x Aristocratic Lady by Invincible Spirit
6	Bustin Stones	United States	Ch.h.	2004	City Zip x Shesasurething by Prospectors Gamble
6	Candy Ride	Argentina	B.c.	1999	Ride The Rails x Candy Girl by Candy Stripes
6	Cavaliere d'Arpino	Italy	B.c.	1926	Havresac x Chuette by Cicero
6	Claude	Italy	B.h.	1964	Hornbeam x Aigue-Vive by Vatellor
6	Dismal	Great Britain	Buc.c.	1733	Godolphin Arabian x Alcock Arabian Mare by Alcock's Arabian
6	Flightline	United States	B.c.	2018	Tapit x Feathered by Indian Charlie
6	Flying Childers	Great Britain	B.c.	1714	Darley Arabian x Betty Leedes by Wharton's Careless
6	Hurry On	Great Britain	Ch.c.	1913	Marcovil x Tout Suite by Sainfoin
6*	Justify	United States	Ch.c.	2015	Scat Daddy x Stage Magic by Ghostzapper
6	Manantial	Argentina	Blk.c.	1955	Gulf Stream x Magda by Full Sail
6	Miss Therese	Chile	Gr.f.	1958	Lucky Lord x Lesna by Filibustero
6	Payaso	Argentina	B.c.	1929	Re-Echo x Payasada by Pippermint
6	Soberbo	Brazil	Ch.c.	1990	Restless Jet x Lark Luciana by Tumble Lark
6	Tolgus	Great Britain	B.h.	1923	Stefan the Great x Rosa Croft by Lemberg
6	Val de Grace	Brazil	Ch.c.	1991	Clackson x In Passion by Hang Ten
6	Windsor Slipper	Ireland	B.c.	1939	Windsor Lad x Carpet Slipper by Phalaris
5	Ajax	France	B.h.	1901	Flying Fox x Amie by Clamart
5	Dice	United States	B.h.	1925	Dominant x Frumpery by Chicle
5	Emerson	Brazil	B.c.	1958	Coaraze x Empeñosa by Full Sail
5	Fasliyev	Ireland	B.h.	1997	Nureyev x Mr P's Princess by Mr. Prospector
5	Hughes	United States	B.c.	2024	Into Mischief x K P Dreamin, by Union Rags
5	Husson	Argentina	Ch.h.	2003	Hussonet x Villa Elisa by Roy
5	Kneller	Great Britain	Ch.c.	1985	Lomond x Fruition by Rheingold
5	Landaluce	United States	B/br.f.	1980	Seattle Slew x Strip Poker by Bold Bidder
5	Landgraf	Germany	B.c.	1914	Louviers x Ladora by Ladas
5	Le Coeur	Argentina	Ch.c.	1922	Le Temps x Blue Bell by Simonside
5	Melody	Argentina	B.f.	1947	Meadow x Elegy by Rustom Pasha
5	Norfolk	United States	B.c.	1861	Lexington x Novice by Glencoe
5	Perigord	Peru	Ch. c.	1954	Pertinaz x Pattern by Borealis
5	Precocious	Great Britain	B.c.	1981	Mummy's Pet x Mrs Moss by Reform
5	Queen's Logic	Ireland	Ch. f.	1999	Grand Lodge x Lagrion by Diesis
5	Reset	Australia	B.h.	2000	Zabeel x Assertive Lass by Zeditave
5	Teofilo	Ireland	B.h.	2004	Galileo x Speirbhean by Danehill
4	Agnes Tachyon	Japan	Ch.h.	1998	Sunday Silence x Agnes Flora by Royal Ski
4	Catchascatchcan	Great Britain	B.f.	1995	Pursuit of Love x Catawba by Mill Reef
4	Drone	United States	Gr.c.	1966	Sir Gaylord x Cap and Bells by Tom Fool. Notable broodmare sire.
4	Fuji Kiseki	Japan	Blk.h	1992	Sunday Silence x Millracer by Le Fabuleux. Champion two-year-old.
4	Golden Fleece	United States	B.c.	1979	Nijinsky II x Exotic Treat by Vaguely Noble. Won Epsom Derby.
4	Lammtarra	United States	Ch.c.	1992	Nijinsky II x Snow Bride by Blushing Groom. Three Group 1 victories.
4	Madelia	France	Ch.m.	1974	Caro x Moonmadness by Tom Fool. French champion 3yo filly.
4	Mastery	United States	Dk. b.c.	2014	Candy Ride x Steady Course by Old Trieste. Cash Call Futurity.
4	Nadal	United States	B.c	2017	Blame x Ascending Angel by Pulpit
4	Raise a Native	United States	Ch.c.	1961	Native Dancer x Raise You by Case Ace. Champion two-year-old colt and noted sire
4	Saphir	Germany	B.c.	1894	Chamant x Sappho by Wisdom. Austrian Derby, three-time champion sire in Germany.
4	Snap	Great Britain	Blk.c.	1750	Snip x Sister to Slipby by Fox. Noted sire.
4	Vindication	United States	B.h.	2000	Seattle Slew x Strawberry Reason by Strawberry Road. Breeders' Cup Juvenile
4	White Moonstone	United States	B.f.	2008	Dynaformer x Desert Gold by Seeking the Gold. Fillies Mile.
3	Army Mule	United States	B.h.	2014	Friesian Fire x Crafty Toast by Crafty Professor. Carter Handicap.
3	Blue Train	Great Britain	Ch.c.	1944	Blue Peter x Sun Chariot by Hyperion
3	Boniform	New Zealand	B.h.	1904	Multiform x Otterden by Sheen
3	Cobweb	Great Britain	B.f.	1821	Phantom x Filagree by Soothsayer. Winner of 1000 Guineas and Oaks.
3	Danzig	United States	B.c.	1977	Northern Dancer x Pas De Nom by Admiral's Voyage. Leading sire.
3	Footstepsinthesand	Ireland	B.c.	2002	Giant's Causeway x Glatisant by Rainbow Quest. Won 2000 Guineas.
3	Meadowlake	United States	Ch.c.	1983	Hold Your Peace x Suspicious Native by Raise a Native. G1 winner.
3	Pharis	France	Bl.c.	1936	Pharos x Carissima by Clarissimus. Noted sire.
3	Pronto	Argentina	B.c.	1958	Timor x Prosperina by Gusty
3	Quorto	Ireland	B.c.	2016	Dubawi x Volume by Mount Nelson
3	Valyra	Great Britain	B.f.	2008	Azamour x Valima by Linamix

*Although Justify finished first in all his races, in 2024 he was officially disqualified from his win in the 2018 Santa Anita Derby, making his official record no longer undefeated. A pending appeal contesting this disqualification was filed in April 2024.

Federico Tesio bred several undefeated champions including Nearco, Ribot, Braque, and Cavaliere d'Arpino, whom he considered the best horse that he ever bred.

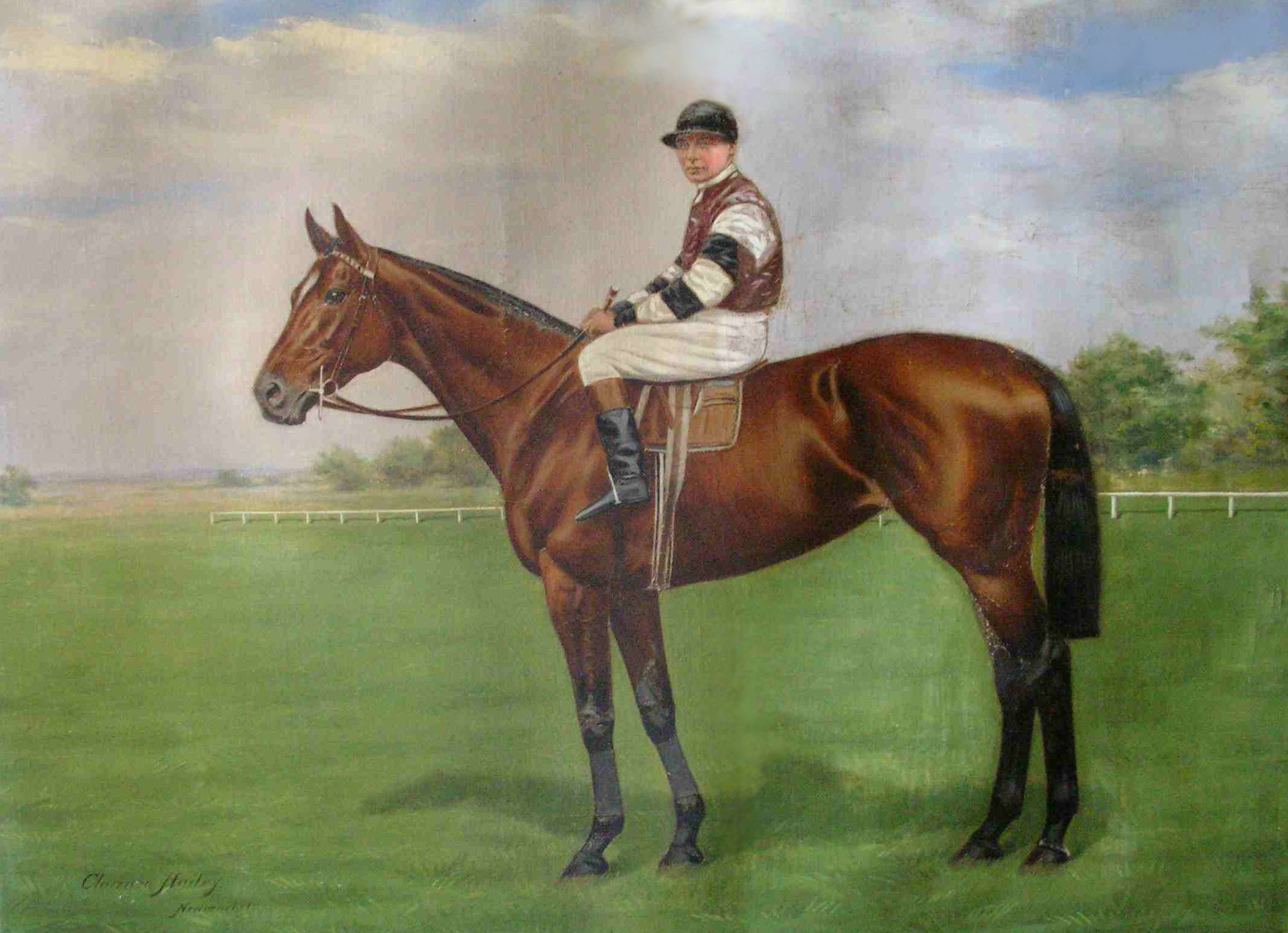
Cherimoya, 1908, won The Oaks at her only start.

=== Undefeated horses without five known starts ===
Nordlicht (chestnut horse 1941–1968, by Oleander x Nereide, by Laland) was also undefeated after an unknown number of starts. His victories included the Deutsches Derby and Austrian Derby. Middleton and Amato had one start each with both of them winning The Derby and then retiring. Cherimoya did likewise when she won The Oaks in her only start. Morston (colt by Ragusa x Windmill Girl by Hornbeam) had two starts, winning both, the second of which was the 1973 Epsom Derby. Sailor won both his races, including the 1820 Epsom Derby. Suspender had three starts, in smaller races, for three wins. Don Juan by Loyalist, Ball's Florizel (1801), Mirza by the Godolphin Arabian, and Lecturer (1869), were also unbeaten, but the number of their wins is unknown.

== Most wins ==
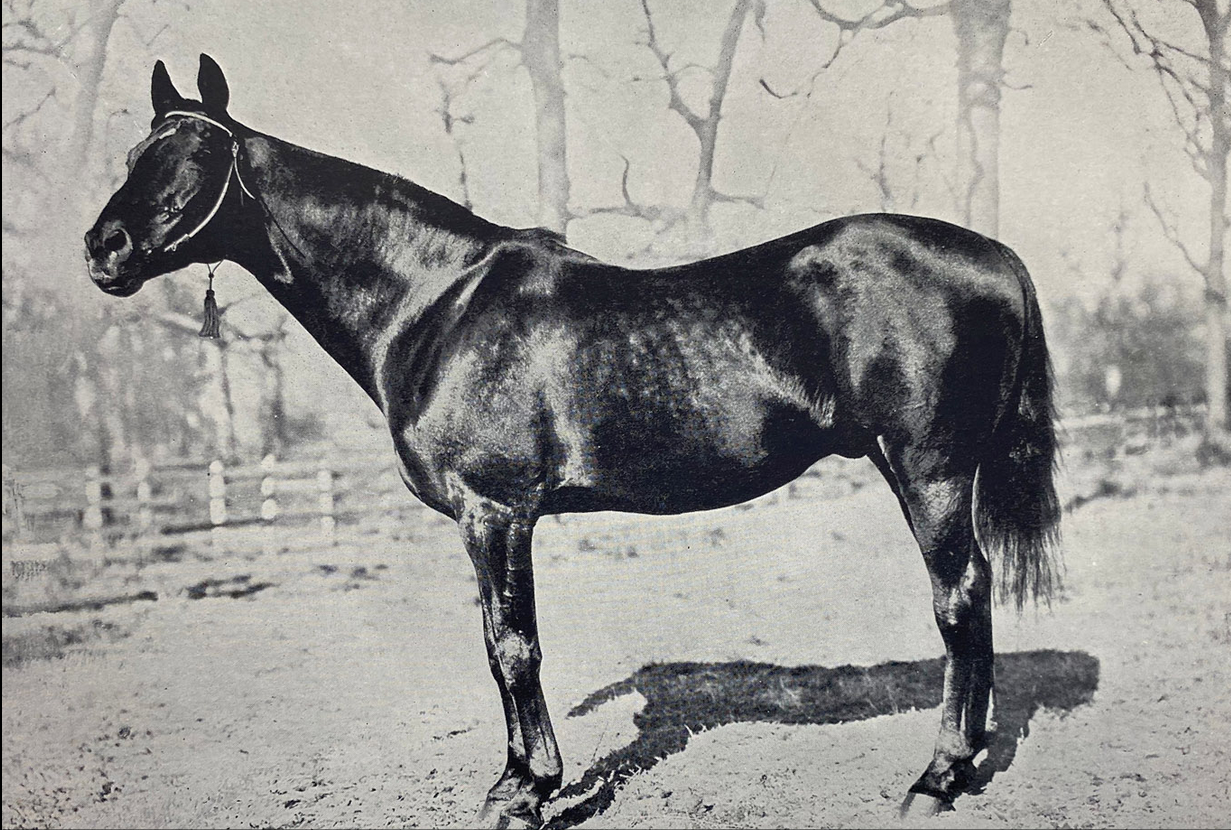
Kingston, winner of 89 races

There have been only 7 horses to win over 100 races, all of them coming from Puerto Rico in restricted racing. The all-time record, recognized by Guinness World Records, is held by Chorisbar who won 197 times over the course of 324 career starts. Condado, a chestnut horse who raced in Puerto Rico from 1936 to 1943, won a grand total of 152 times Galgo Jr. earned 137 wins in 159 starts from 1930 to 1936. Cofresi won 119 races, racing at around the same time as Condado.

In the United States, Kingston (by Spendthrift) had 138 starts and won 89 of these, including 30 stakes-races. According to the American Horse Racing Hall of Fame, his 89 wins set the all-time record. Commencing a winning sequence as a four-year-old on 21 August 1888, Kingston had 35 race starts until 30 May 1891 during which he was defeated only twice. Bankrupt won 86 races from 348 starts, and he was also by Spendthrift. Tippety Witchet (1915, by Broomstick) started 266 times for 78 wins. Pan Zareta started 151 times with 76 wins and is considered to be the "winningest female Thoroughbred in American history".

Catherina (1830, by Whisker) started in 176 races and won 79 of them, many over long distances, including the Manchester Cup, Tradesmen's Cup, and Heaton Park's King's Cup. Many of Catherina's races were heat races, and she therefore actually faced the starter 298 times and was the first past the finish line 136 times, including two disqualifications, one walkover, and two dead-heats.

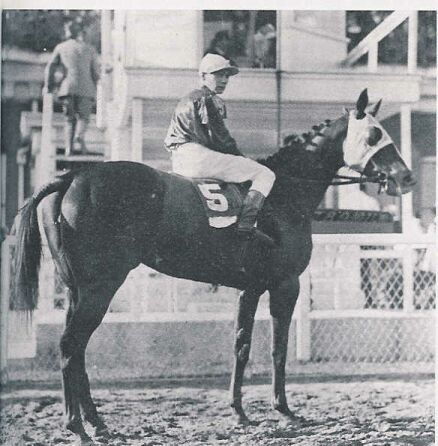
- Pan Zareta, the "winningest mare in American history"
  197 – Chorisbar (PR)
- 160 – Yaucono
- 152 – Condado (PR)
- 137 – Galgo Jr (PR)
- 132 – Lenoxbar
- 119 – Cofresi
- 100 – Tite
- 89 – Kingston (USA)
- 86 – Bankrupt
- 79 – Catherina (GB) (136 heats), Bachiller (PR)
- 78 – Tippity Witchet (USA), Cocoliso (PR)
- 76 – Pan Zareta (USA)
- 73 – Camarero (PR)
- 70 – Fisherman (GB), Raceland (USA)
- 65 – Jorrocks, Ritmo Criollo
- 63 – Vuelve Candy B. (PR)
- 62 – Imp (USA), Seth's Hope

== Successive victories ==
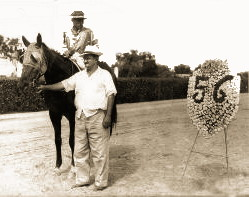
Camarero after 56 consecutive race wins

The horses who were defeated but had ten or more consecutive race wins include

- 56 – Camarero (PR)
- 49 – Cofresi (PR)
- 43 – Condado (PR)
- 39 –Galgo Jr (PR)
- 37 – Condado (PR)
- 33 – Winx (AUS)‡
- 32 – Bachiller (PR)
- 29 – Dojima Fighter (JPN)
- 26 – Cofresi (PR)
- 25 – Tite (PR)
- 24 – Sicótico (DOM), Ivor Hill (FR)
- 23 – Leviathan (USA), Cardiólogo (PR)
- 22 – Cocoliso (PR), Generations (USA), Miss Petty (AUS)‡, Pooker T (PR), Rapid Redux (USA), Second Melbourne (JPN)
- 21 – (Bond's) First Consul (USA), Lottery (USA)‡, Meteor (GB), Picnic in the Park (AUS), Ka Ying Rising(NZ)

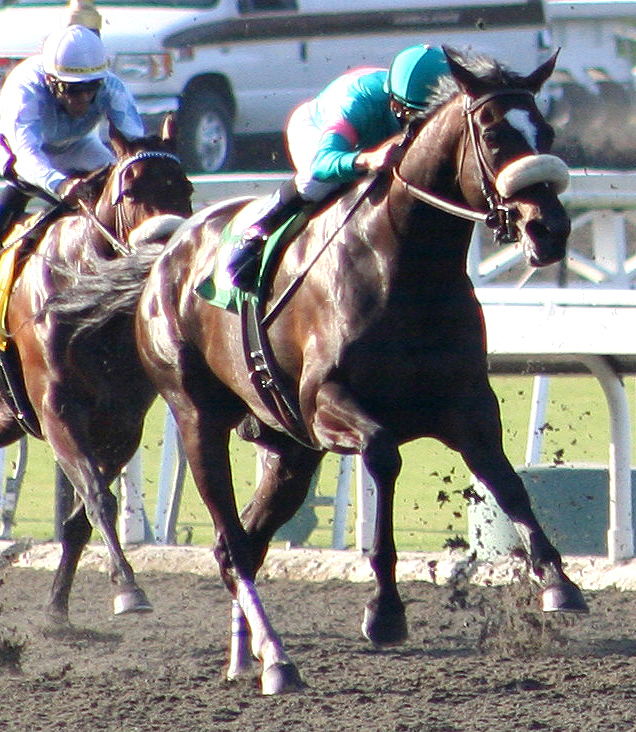
Zenyatta gallops off to the 13th of 19 straight victories in the Lady's Secret

- 20 – Fashion (USA)‡, Filch (IRE), Kentucky (USA)
- 19 – Altior (IRE), Capa Prieto (PR), Cheers Fancy (JPN), Desert Gold (NZ)‡, Estrellero (PR), Gloaming (AUS), Light (FR), The Hero (GB), Sweetmeat (GB), Zenyatta (USA)‡
- 18 – Ajax (AUS), Big Buck's (FR), High Security (VEN), Hindoo (USA), Sally Hope (USA)‡,
- 17 – Alice Hawthorn (GB)‡, Bachiller (PR), Beeswing (GB)‡, Belmont Actor (JPN), Blazing Free (VEN), Boston (USA), Careless (Warren's, 1751), Condado (PR), Gay Lungi (AUS), Gradisco (VEN), Hanover (USA), Mainbrace (NZ), Mister Park (KOR), Silent Witness (AUS), Sir Ken (GB)
- 16 – Botafogo (ARG), Cigar (USA), Citation (USA), Cofresi (PR), Golden Sixty (AUS), Hallowed Dreams (USA), Honeysuckle (GB)‡, Luke Blackburn (USA), Miss Woodford (USA)‡ Mister Frisky (USA), Sweetmeat (GB), Terminator (USA), The Bard (GB)

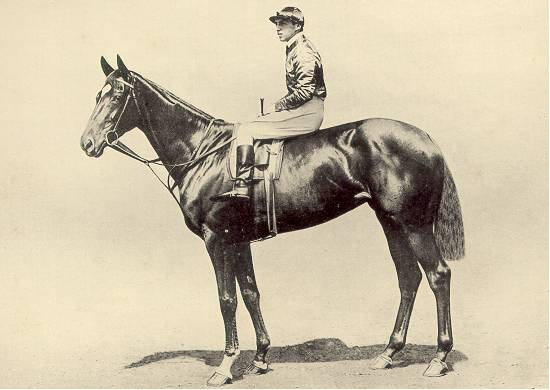
Pretty Polly, winner of 15 consecutive races

- 15 – Bayardo (GB), Bernborough (AUS), Brigadier Gerard (GB), Buckpasser (USA), Po Gyeong Seon (NZ), Saegangja (KOR), Carbine (NZ), Exclusivo (PR), Galgo Jr (PR), Gay James (AUS), Pretty Polly (IRE)‡, Squanderer (IND), The Flying Dutchman (GB), Vander Pool (USA)
- 14 – Bandit Bomber (USA), Cadeneta (PR), Douvan (FR), D' Wildcat Speed (USA), Friponnier (GB), Harry Bassett (USA), Hurley Road (PR), Kukulkan (MEX), Man o' War (USA), Overdose (GB), Phar Lap (NZ), Prince Charlie (GB), Oguri Cap (JPN), Springfield (GB), Stylish Lord (AUS), Vuelve Candy B (PR), Yaucono (PR)
- 13 – Bula (GB), Camarine (GB)‡, Condado (PR), Cocoliso (PR), Effie Deans (GB)‡, Galgo Jr (Twice) (PR), Grano De Oro (IRE), Ignieto (PR), Limerick (NZ), Kingston (USA), Mollie McCarty (USA)‡, Planet (USA), Polar Star (IRE),Timoleon (USA)

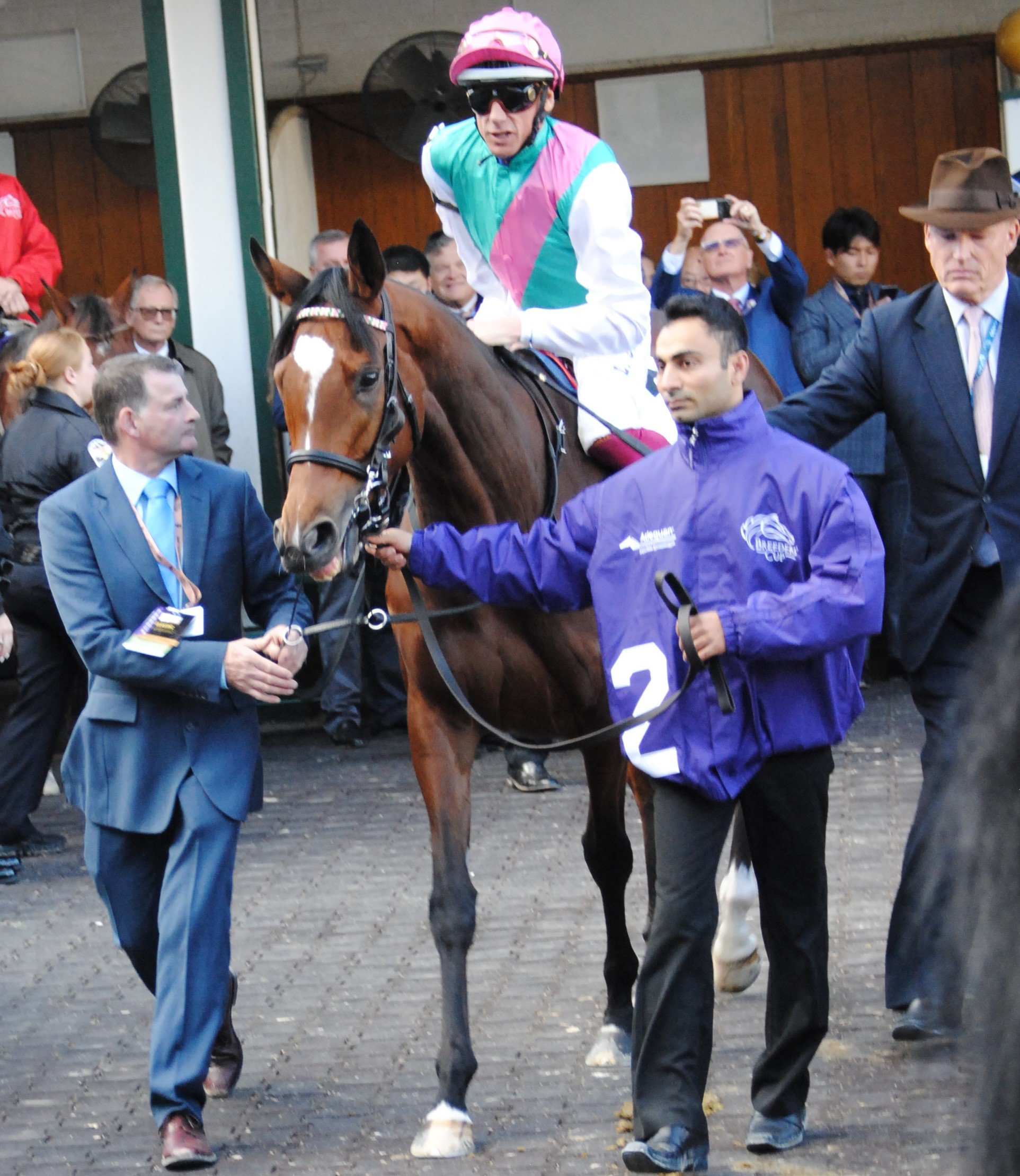
Enable, winner of 12 consecutive races

- 12 – Cocoliso (PR), Defensora (PR)‡, Dongbanui Gangja (KOR), Elusive Pimpernel (IND),, Yumeno Honoo(JPN), Enable (GB) ‡, Gallant Bloom (USA)‡, Harkaway (IRE), Hurley Road (PR), Strike the Anvil (USA), La Prevoyante (CAN), Morvich (USA), No Involvement (AUS), Spectacular Bid (USA), Super Easy (NZ), Tulloch (NZ), Verset's Jet (PR), Va Bank (IRE), War Zone (JAM), Yaucono (PR) (twice)
- 11 – Azeri (USA)‡, Autumn Glow (AUS), Buveur d'Air(FR), Dainana Hoshu (JPN), Don Paco (PR), Eurythmic (AUS), Faugheen (IRE), Home Guard (SAF), Kelso (USA)*, Kerness K, Kingston Town (AUS), Miracle Man (JAM), Native Dancer (USA), Nijinsky (CAN), Oju Chosan (JPN), Perfeccion (PR), Pink Lloyd (CAN), Royal Dad (JAM), Somerset Fair (NZ), Songbird (USA)‡, Taka O (JPN), The Harrovian (AUS), The Kid (PR), Tom Fool (USA), Tosa Midori (JPN), War Admiral (USA), Wizard (JPN), Yaucono(PR)

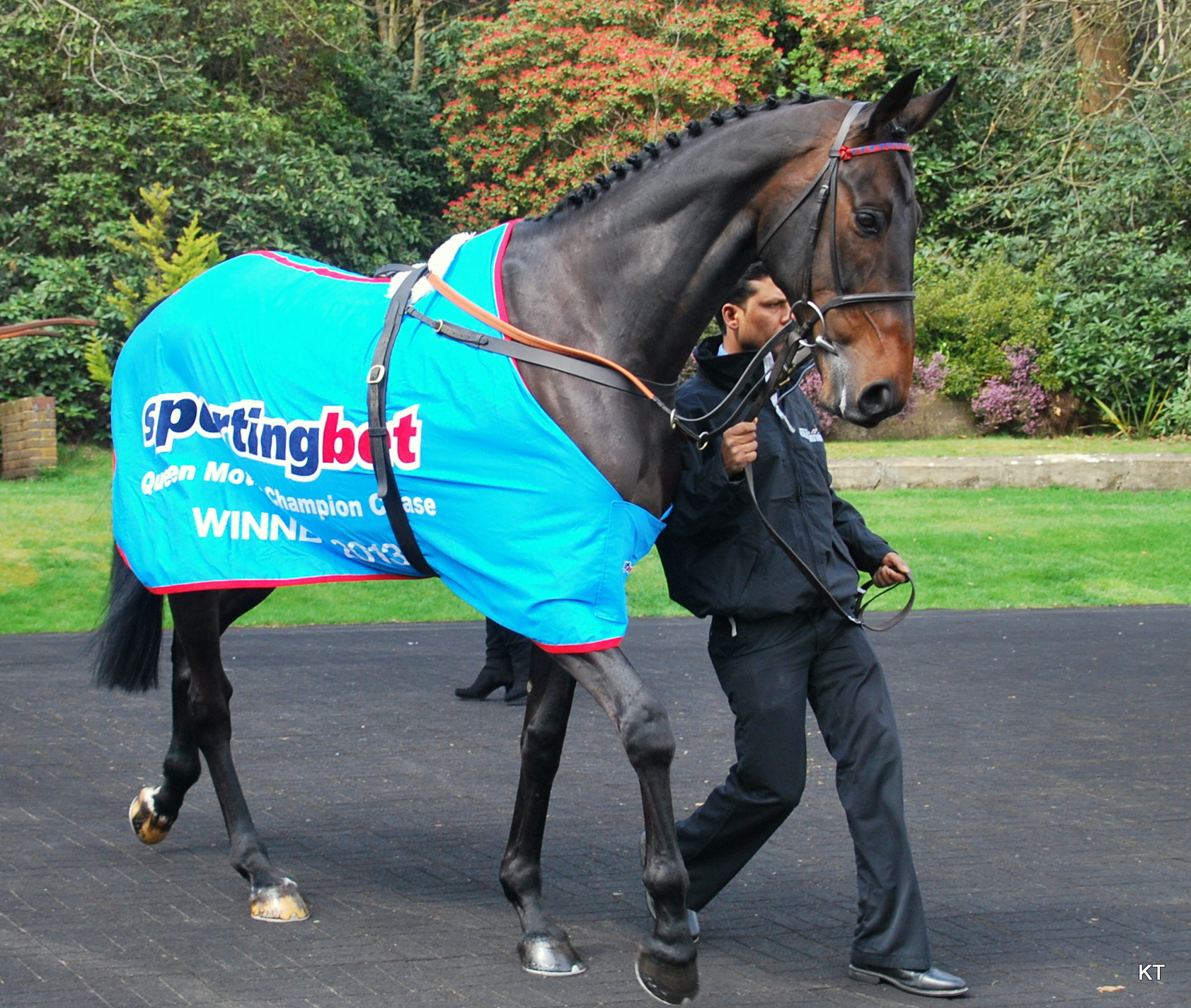
Sprinter Sacre, winner of 10 consecutive races

- 10 – Annie Power (IRE), Arquitecto (PR), Awesome Feather (USA)‡, Baaeed (GB), Bambera (VEN)‡, Beauty Generation (NZ), Better Than Ever (AUS), Co Tack (AUS), Condado (PR), Contention (USA), Count Fleet (USA), Dainty Dotsie (USA), Dark Mirage (USA)‡, Dearly Precious (USA), Elusive Pimpernel (IND), Emerald Hill (BRZ), Exclusivo (PR), Galgo Jr (PR), Haiseiko (JPN), Kindergarten (NZ), King Speed (JPN), Leonardo (PAN), Lost in the Fog (USA), Giselle (JPN), Luthier Blues (ARG), Mac Diarmida (USA), Mended (USA)‡, Muad'dib (USA), Mystical (IND), Native Dancer (USA), Open Mind (USA), Piko, Quijano (GER), Raiden Leader (JPN), Ruffian (USA)‡, Runnin'toluvya (USA), Sarazen (USA), Shinny (USA), Silent Rule (USA) Sir Fever (URU), Solow (GB) Spectacular Bid (USA), Surround (NZ)‡, Sprinter Sacre (FR), Star Guitar (USA), Stradivarius (IRE), Sysonby (USA), Totally Evil (USA)

‡ Filly or mare

*The ninth race in Kelso's streak was earned via disqualification.

Horses with long sequences of jumping victories include Sir Ken, who won 16 hurdle races in England; and Poethlyn, who won 11 steeplechases in succession, including two Grand National races.

== Most wins in one season ==
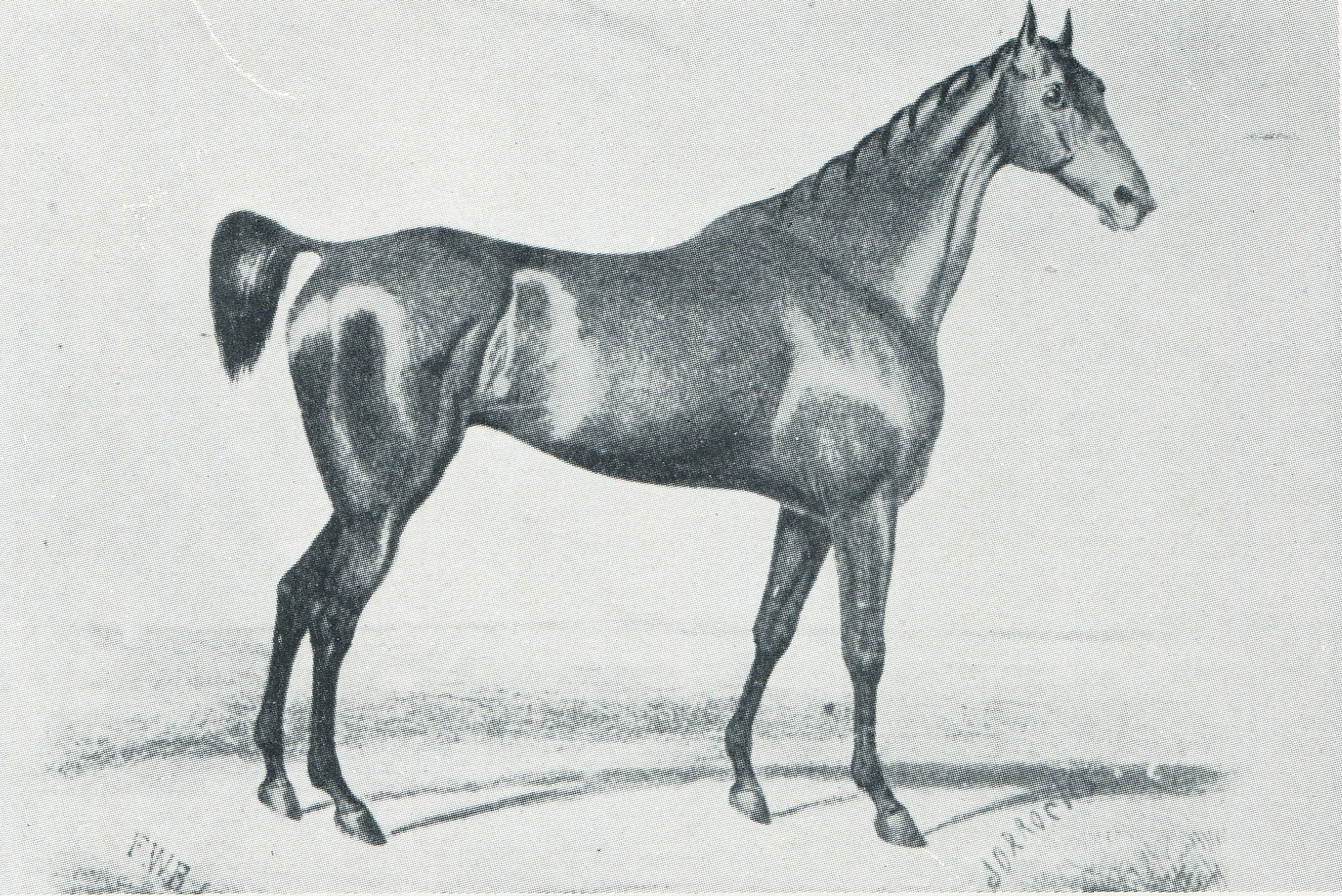
Jorrocks, Australian racehorse famous for winning many races, including 30 of 31 in 1846

- 46
  - Lenoxbar – 1940
- 38
  - Condado (PR) – 1937
- 37
  - Chorisbar – 1941
- 35
  - Condado (PR) – 1940
- 32
  - Yaucono (PR) – 1939
- 30
  - Jorrocks (AUS) – 1846, also known as The Iron Gelding, won 30 of his 31 starts, carrying no less than nine stone (126 lbs) over the usual distances of two or three miles
  - Galgo Jr (PR) – 1931
  - Condado (PR) – 1938
- 29
  - Camarero (PR) – 1955
- 28
  - Chorisbar – 1940,1942
- 27
  - Condado (PR) – 1939
- 25
  - Galgo Jr (PR) – 1935
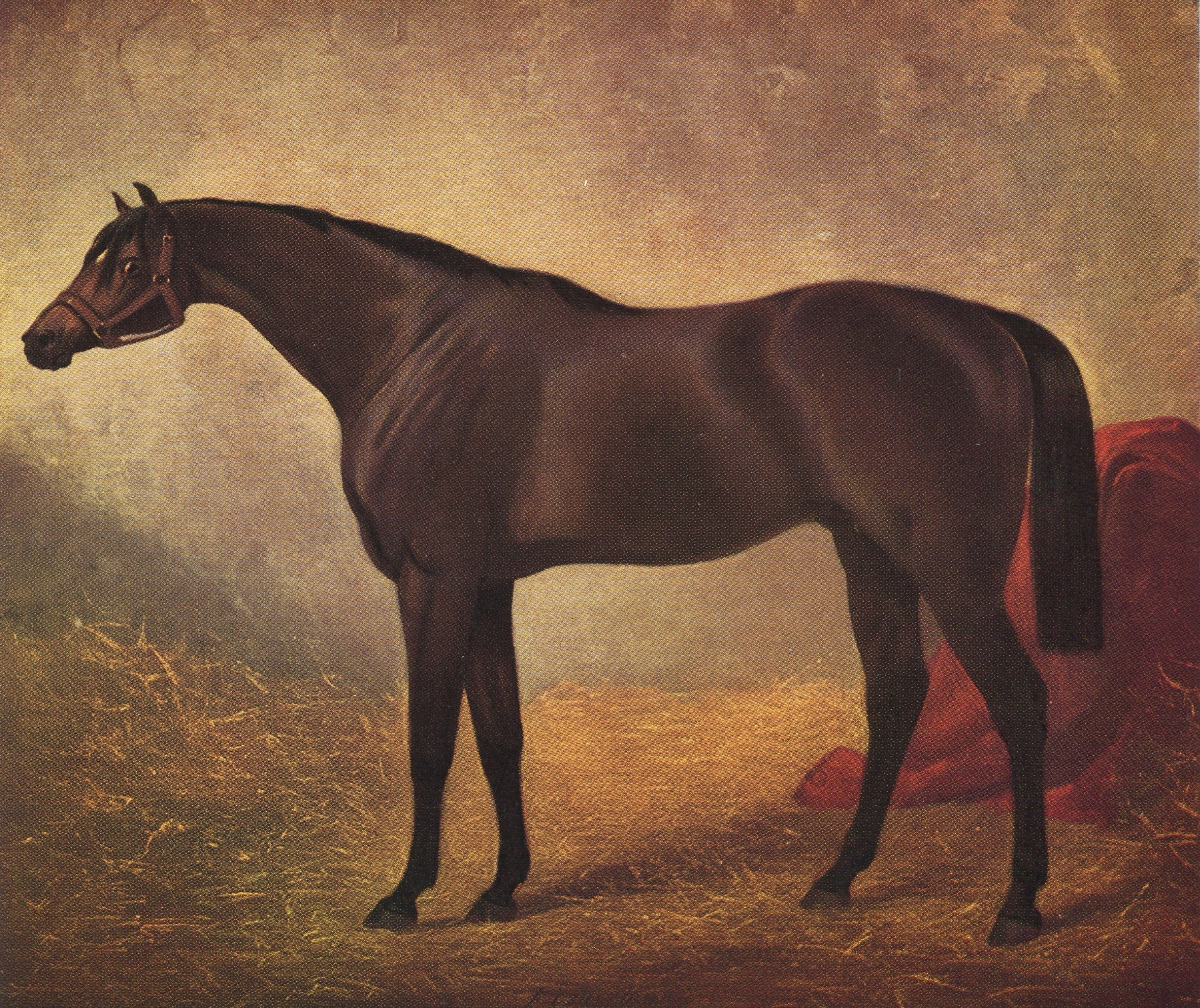
    Fisherman, who won 23 races in 1856 and 22 races in 1857
- 23
  - Fisherman (GB) – 1856; as a three-year-old, winning from 1/2 mile to 3 miles
  - Bachiller (PR) – 1945
  - Chorisbar – 1945, 1946
  - Yaucono (PR) – 1942
- 22
  - Donald Macdonald (USA) – 1913
  - Fisherman (GB) – 1857
  - Luke Blackburn (USA) – 1880
- 21
  - Alice Hawthorn (GB) – 1844; won 20 races and one dead-heat
  - Fisherman (GB)
  - Galgo Jr (PR) – 1930
  - Imp (USA) – 1898
  - Lilian (GB) – 1874
  - Picnic in the Park (AUS) from 23 starts including breaking down in final race
  - Top Ace (AUS)
  - Yaucono (PR) – 1938,1941,1943
- 20
  - Hanover (USA) – 1887
- 19
  - Bachiller (PR) – 1948
  - Citation (USA) – 1948
  - Cocoliso (PR) – 1944 in 20 starts;
  - Camarero (PR) – 1954
  - Galgo Jr (PR) – 1932
  - Phar Lap (AUS)
  - Rapid Redux (USA) – 2011
  - Roseben (USA) – 1905
  - The Kid (PR) – 1957
  - Vuelve Candy B. (PR) – 1993
- 18
  - Bo Judged (USA) – 1989
  - Camarero (PR) – 1953
  - Clifford (USA) – 1893
  - Hindoo (USA) – 1881
  - Galgo Jr (PR) – 1934
- 17
  - Capa Prieto (PR) – 1982
  - Kincsem (HUN) – 1877
  - The Kid (PR) – 1956
  - Yaucono (PR) – 1940
- 16
  - A Shin Accelern (JPN) – 2008
  - Bachiller (PR) – 1946
  - Chorisbar – 1947
  - Cocoliso (PR) – 1943
  - Provideo (IRE) – 1984
  - Princesa (PR) – 1973
  - Sweetmeat (GB) – 1845
  - The Bard (GB) – 1883
  - Timeless Times
  - Wiso G (PR) – 1968
  - Yaucono (PR) – 1944
- 15
  - Alsab (USA) – 1941
  - Beverly Park (USA) – 2022
  - Condado (PR) – 1941
  - Kincsem (HUN) – 1878
  - Kingston (USA) – 1891
  - Mainbrace (NZ)
  - Old Rosebud (USA) – 1917
  - Pan Zareta (USA) – 1913, 1915
  - Round Table (USA) – 1957
  - Taka O (JPN) – 1954
  - Vuelve Candy B. (PR) – 1991
- 14
  - Ajax (FR)
  - Bandit Bomber (USA) – 1994
  - Billy Kelly (USA) – 1918
  - Desert Gold (NZ)
  - Galgo Jr (PR) – 1933
  - Golden Hare (USA) – 2007
  - Kingston (USA) – 1889
  - Phar Lap (NZ)
  - Tulloch (NZ)
  - Twilight Tear (USA) – 1944
  - Round Table (USA) – 1958
- 13
  - Bambera (VEN) – 2009
  - Bandit Bomber (USA) – 1995
  - Beldame (USA) – 1904
  - Ben Brush (USA) – 1895
  - Bricola (USA) – 2000
  - Buckpasser (USA) – 1966
  - Cheers Fancy (JPN) – 1993
  - Cherokee Pepper (PR)
  - Chorisbar – 1938, 1939
  - Coaltown (USA) – 1949
  - Cocoliso (PR) – 1942, 1945, 1946
  - Colin (USA) – 1907
  - Creme de la Fete
  - Damascus (USA) – 1967
  - Difficult Doll (USA) – 2000
  - D' Wildcat Speed (USA) –2003
  - El Manut (PAN) – 1978
  - Emperor of Norfolk (USA) – 1887
  - Fab's Cowboy (AUS) – 2016/17
  - Firenze (USA) – 1888
  - Gloaming (AUS)
  - Govenors Ego (USA) – 2000
  - Grey Way (NZ)
  - Henry of Navarre (USA) – 1894
  - Hurley Road – 1981
  - Kingston (USA) – 1887, 1892
  - Kingston Town (AUS)
  - Music Express – 1990
  - La Mistica (PR) – 2001
  - La Policlinica (PR) – 2002
  - La Prevoyante (USA) – 1972
  - Larrea (ARG) – 1911
  - Mac Diarmida (USA) – 1978
  - Mi Preferido (PR) – 2006
  - Mister Frisky (USA) – 1989
  - Nagwa (GB) – 1975
  - Old Rosebud (USA) – 1913
  - Pan Zareta (USA) – 1912, 1914, 1917
  - Weston (USA)
- 12
  - Grey Fox (ARG) – 1918
  - Parole (USA) – 1881
  - Roamer (USA) – 1914
  - Spindrifter (FR) – 1980
  - Surround (NZ)
  - Tremont (USA) – 1886
  - Uncle Remus (NZ)
  - Jiva Coolit (USA) – 1977
  - Verset's Dancer (PR) – 1983
  - Verset's Jet (PR) – 1995
  - Vuelve Candy B. (PR) – 1992, 1994
  - Whirlaway (USA) – 1941, 1942
  - Zev (USA) – 1923
- 11
  - A Shin Accelern (JPN) – 2009
  - Almendra (PR) – 1972
  - Armed (USA) – 1946, 1947
  - Arriesgado (USA) – 2018
  - Bold Ruler (USA) – 1957
  - Botafogo (ARG) – 1917
  - Call Me Mr. Vain (USA) – 2003
  - Cicada (USA) – 1961
  - Discovery (USA) – 1935
  - Don Paco (PR) – 2011
  - Don Piero (PR) – 2001
  - Duke of Magenta (USA) – 1878
  - Dusty's Lil Book (USA) – 2002
  - El Serrano (ARG) – 1986
  - Estrellero (PR) – 2001
  - Karayel (TUR) – 1973
  - La Voyageuse (CAN) – 1980
  - Luminosa In (ARG) – 1996
  - Man o' War (USA) – 1920
  - Mediavilla R (PR) – 2002
  - Pan Pan (ARG) – 1915
  - Poseidon (AUS) – 1906/7
  - Princess Doreen (USA) – 1925
  - Proud Miss
  - Red Craze (NZ)
  - Rico (ARG) – 1922
  - Seabiscuit (USA) – 1937
  - Shotgun Pro – 2000
  - Soba (GB) – 1982
  - Tejano Couture – 2002
  - Vindaloo (GB) – 1995
- 10
  - Adyacente (URU) – 1994
  - Armed (USA) – 1945
  - Astrologica (ARG) – 1996
  - Bernborough (AUS)
  - Blow the Whistle (USA) – 2018
  - Bo Judged (USA) – 1988
  - Busher (USA) – 1945
  - Canadian Champ (CAN) – 1956
  - Cantchaco (USA) – 2017
  - Carbine (NZ)
  - Cigar (USA) – 1995
  - Clifford (USA) – 1894
  - Count Fleet (USA) – 1942
  - Dainty Dotsie (USA)
  - Determine (USA) – 1954
  - Decathlon (USA) – 1956
  - Dijital (ARG) – 1915
  - Diplomatical (USA) – 2003
  - Dojima Fighter (JPN) – 1998
  - El Rebelde (PR) – 1966
  - Equipoise (USA) – 1932
  - Esplendorosa (PR) – 2018
  - Exclusive Valley (PR) – 2002
  - Exterminator (USA) – 1920, 1922
  - Fachinero (ARG) – 1916
  - Gamblin Time (USA) – 2002
  - Hillsdale (USA) – 1959
  - Hot Rodin (USA) – 2018
  - Irigoyen (ARG) – 1913
  - Kindergarten (NZ)
  - Kincsem (HUN) – 1876
  - Kingston (USA) – 1888
  - Lady Aloha (USA) – 2002
  - Lady's Secret (USA) – 1985, 1986
  - Man o' War (USA) – 1919
  - Mended (USA) – 2017
  - Mi Preferido (PR) – 2007
  - Miracle Man (JAM) – 2006
  - Miss Woodford (USA) – 1883
  - Nashua (USA) – 1955
  - Ormonde (GB)
  - Persie (USA) – 2018
  - Pikotazo (MEX) – 1980
  - Purple Ruckus – 2002
  - Rising Fast (NZ)
  - Sarazen (USA) – 1923
  - Skipat (USA) – 1979
  - Sicótico (DOM) – 2008
  - Sin Rumbo (ARG) – 1917
  - Six Ninety One (USA) – 2021
  - Spectacular Bid (USA) – 1979
  - Storming On Merit (USA) – 2003
  - Trafalgar
  - Tom Fool (USA) – 1953
  - Tosmah (USA) – 1964
  - Tuscalee (USA) – 1966
  - Wizard (JPN) – 1950

== Most group / grade one (G1) wins ==
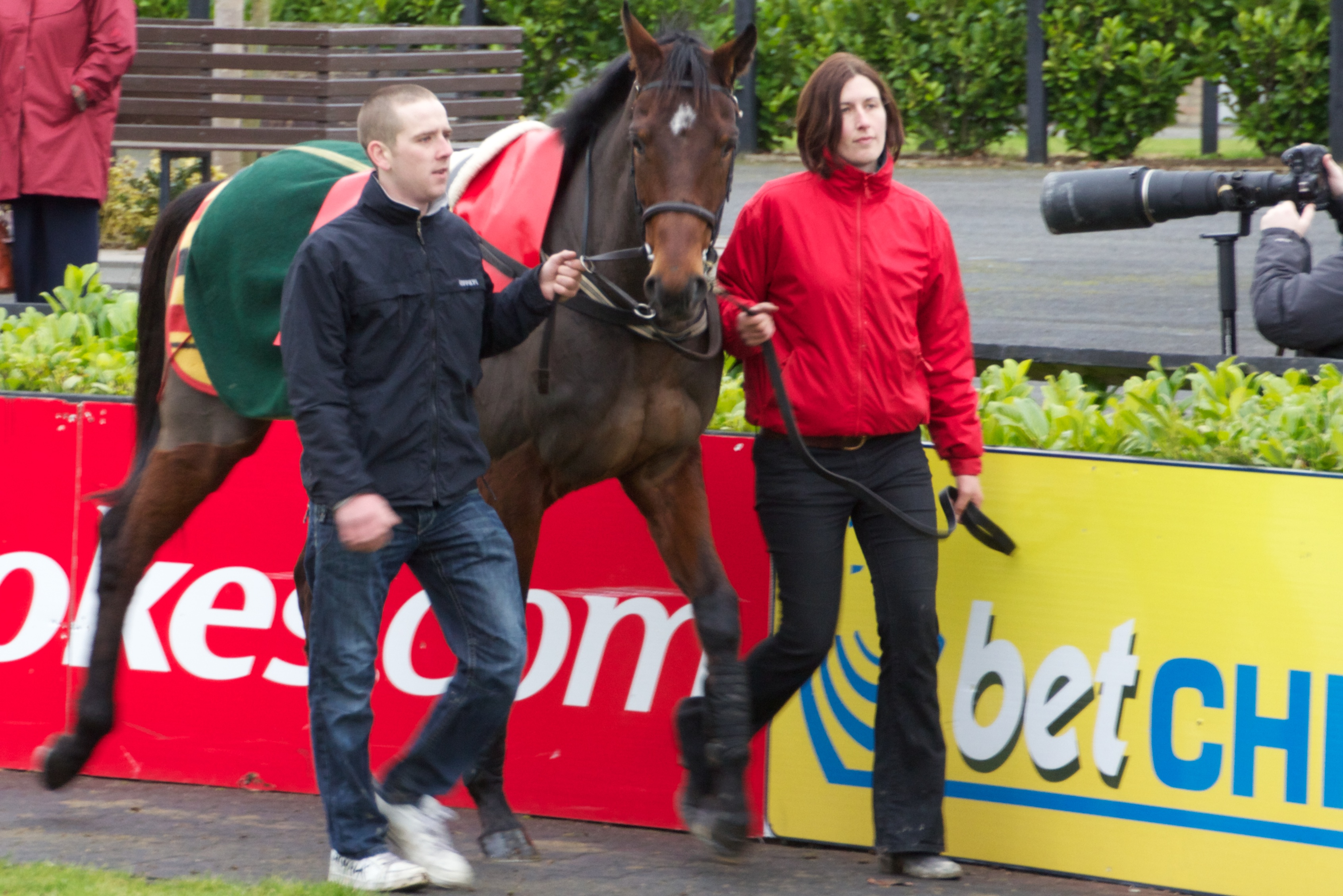
Hurricane Fly being walked by his handlers before a race

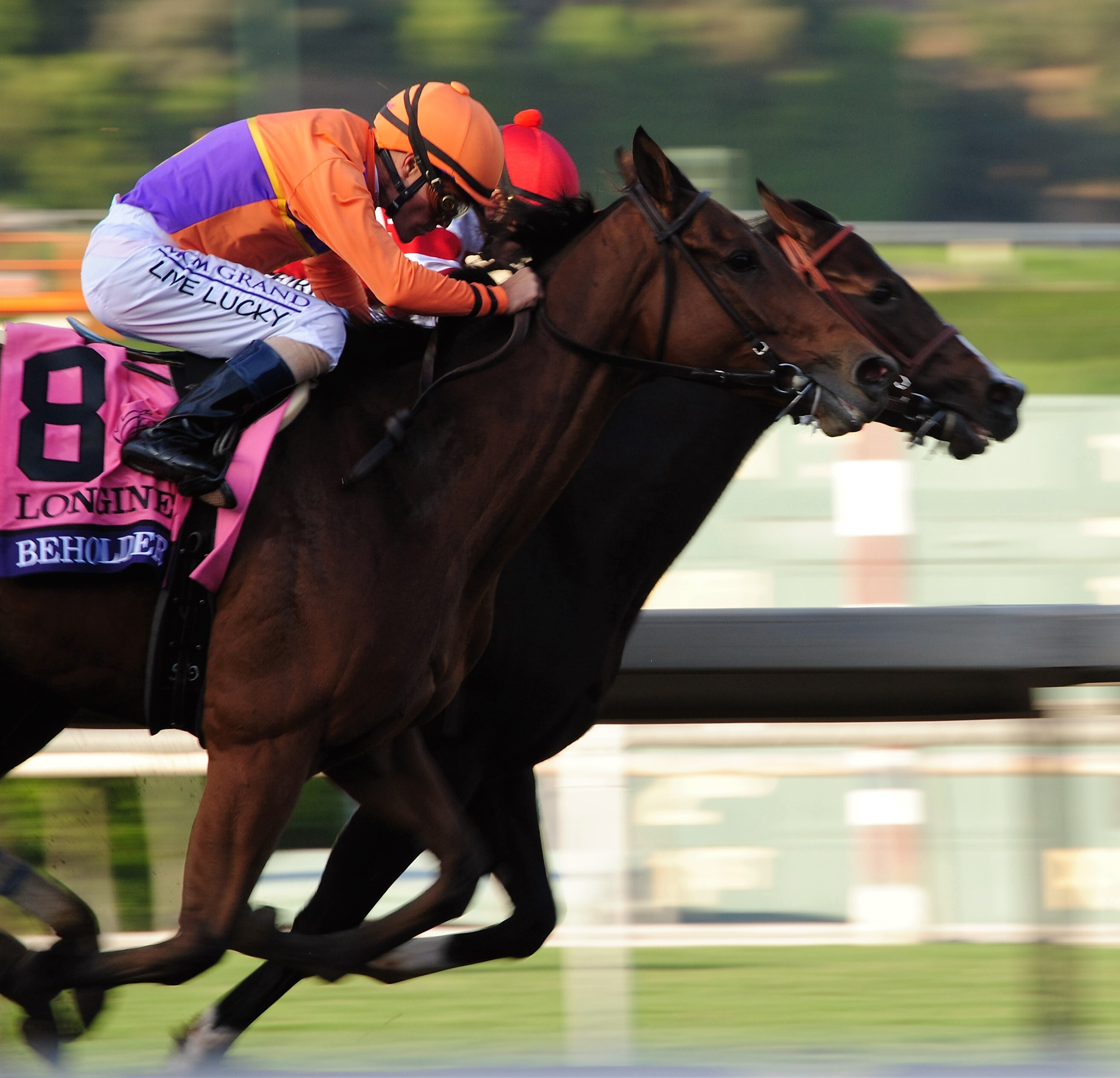
Beholder (outside) overtaking Songbird in the Distaff for her eleventh Grade I win

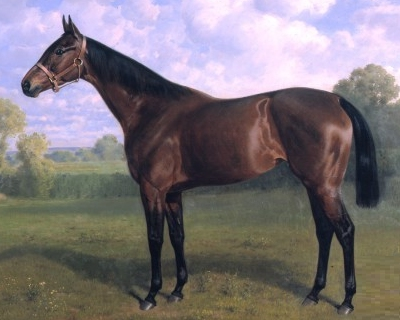
Sceptre by Emil Adam

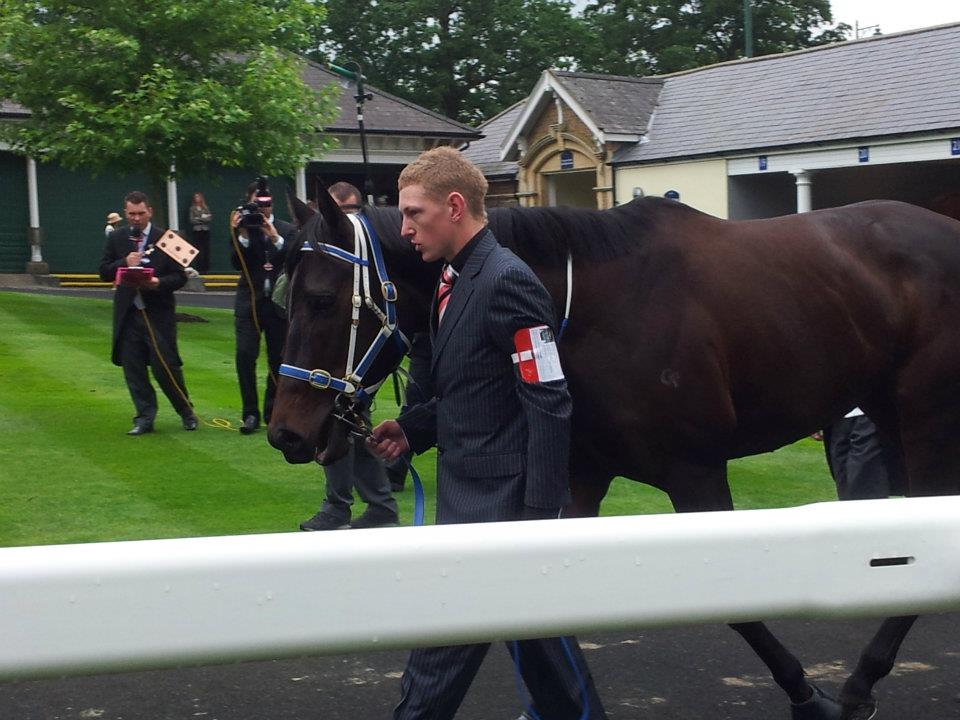
Black Caviar before the Diamond Jubilee Stakes

To identify the highest quality races, the pattern race system was introduced in Europe in 1971, followed by the graded stakes system in North America in 1974. Other countries followed suit, though the criteria and quality has not always been consistent between racing jurisdictions. The following list considers horses that won grade one / group one races that were open for International competition. Winners of local (restricted) group / grade one wins are not included.

The horses with ten or more such G1 race wins are:

- 25 – Winx (AUS)‡
- 22 – Hurricane Fly (IRE)
- 16 – John Henry (USA), Kauto Star (FR)
- 15 – Black Caviar (AUS)‡, Romantic Warrior (IRE),
- 14 – Affirmed (USA), Forego (USA), Goldikova (IRE)‡, Kingston Town (AUS), Melody Belle (NZ)‡, Istabraq (IRE)
- 13 – Bayakoa (ARG)‡, Honeysuckle‡, Moscow Flyer (IRE), Spectacular Bid (USA), Sunline (NZ)‡, Tie the Knot (AUS),Zenyatta (USA)‡
- 12 – Galopin Des Champs (FRA)‡, State Man (FR),
- 11 – Apple's Jade (FRA)‡, Beholder (USA)‡, Cigar (USA), Enable‡ (GB), Lady's Secret (USA)‡, Lonhro (AUS), Manikato (AUS), McDynamo (USA), Rough Habit (NZ), Serena's Song‡ (USA), Verry Elleegant (NZ) ‡, Wise Dan (USA), Azeri (USA)‡
- 10 – Altior (IRE), Beef Or Salmon (IRE), Big Buck's (FRA), Brave Inca (IRE), Dahlia (USA)‡, Golden Sixty (AUS), Faugheen (IRE), Frankel (GB), Imperatriz (AUS),
  Miesque (USA)‡, Paseana (ARG)‡, Octagonal (NZ), Mufhasa (NZ), Skip Away (USA), So You Think (NZ), Via Sistina (IRE)‡, Jonbon (GB)

‡ Mare

In 1902 Sceptre became the only racehorse to win four British Classic Races outright. Previously, in 1868, Formosa won the same four races but dead-heated in the 2,000 Guineas Stakes.

== Successive group / grade one (G1) wins ==
This list shows horses who won a series of Grade/Group 1 races without a loss and without an intervening race at a lower level of competition.

- 11 – Honeysuckle(GB)‡
- 10 – Winx (AUS)‡
- 9 – Zenyatta (USA)‡, Frankel (GB), Hurricane Fly (IRE)
- 8 – Black Caviar (AUS)‡, Constitution Hill (GB)
- 7 – Rock of Gibraltar (IRE), Sprinter Sacre (FR), Miss Terrible (ARG)‡, Emerald Hill (BRZ)‡
- 6 – Alpinista (GB), Baaeed (GB), Equinox (JPN), Mill Reef (USA), Invasor (ARG), Sea the Stars (IRE), State Man (FR), Jonbon (FR), Good Night Shirt (USA), Sistercharlie (IRE)‡, Wolf (CHI), Kay Army (CHI)
- 5 – Almond Eye (JPN)‡, American Pharoah (USA), Affirmed (USA), Calandagan (IRE), Cigar (USA), Douvan (FR), Easy Goer (USA), Enable (GB)‡, Go For Wand (USA)‡, Giant's Causeway (USA), Gun Runner (USA), McDynamo (USA), Paseana (ARG), Rachel Alexandra (USA)‡, Seattle Slew (USA), Solow (GB), Spectacular Bid (USA), Skip Away (USA), Stardom Bound (USA)‡, Wise Dan (USA), St Mark's Basilica (FR), Asidero (ARG), Romantic Warrior (IRE) 2x

‡ Mare

== Successive Stakes wins ==
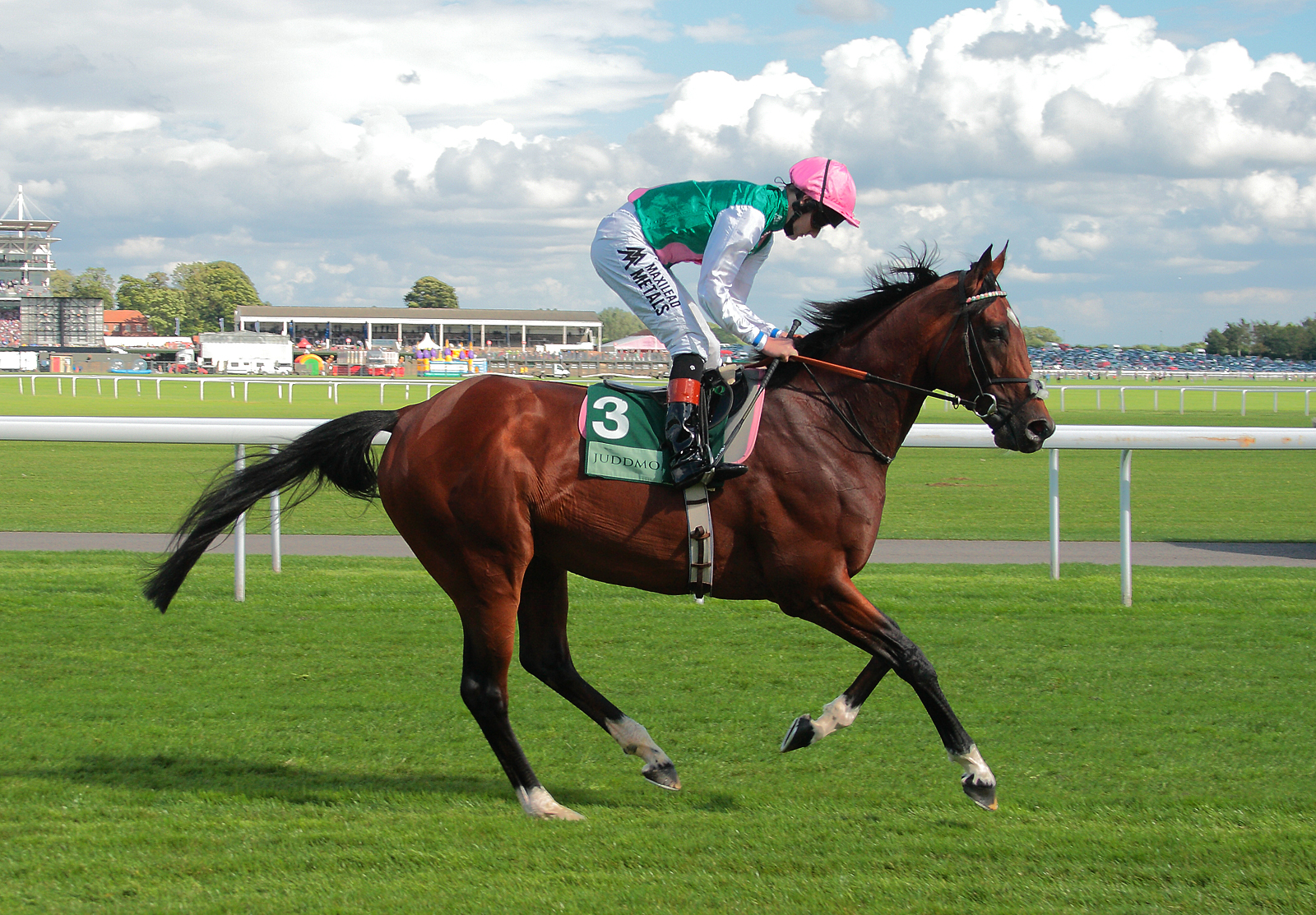
Frankel, the winner of 12 successive stakes

- 33 – Winx‡
- 23 – Black Caviar‡
- 17 – Zenyatta‡
- 16 – El Manut (PAN)
- 15 – Citation, Man o War
- 13 – Cigar, Colin, Tremont
- 12 – Brigadier Gerard, Spectacular Bid, Frankel
- 11 – Enable‡, Kingston Town, Ormonde, Pink Lloyd, Tom Fool, Va Bank
- 10 – Star Guitar, Songbird‡, Stradivarius, Sysonby

‡ = Filly or mare

== Once-defeated horses ==
Below is a list of Thoroughbred racehorses who were defeated once. The list is not comprehensive for otherwise unnotable horses with fewer than ten wins.

Horses such as Wheel of Fortune, Barbaro, Ruffian and Vanity (1812, either 10:9–0–0 or 12:11–0–0) sustained injury or broke down in their only defeat.

Wins	Horse	Origin	Details	History	Race defeated
23:22–1–0	Elusive Pimpernel	India	Ch.h. 1991	Wattlefield x Right Step by Ilheus	1995 Idar Gold Trophy, 2nd
22:21–?–?	Lottery	United States	Ch.m. 1803	Bedford x Anvilina by Anvil	Lost her first race
22:21–1–0	Native Dancer	United States	Gr.h. 1950	Polynesian x Geisha by Discovery	1953 Kentucky Derby, 2nd
21:20–1–0	Man o' War	United States	Ch.h. 1917	Fair Play x Mahubah by Rock Sand	1919 Sanford Stakes, 2nd
20:19–1–0	Zenyatta	United States	Dk b/br.m. 2004	Street Cry x Vertigineux by Kris S.	2010 Breeders' Cup Classic, 2nd
19:18–0–0	Friponnier	Great Britain	Ch.h. 1864	Chevalier Dindustrie x Tension by Teddington	Lost his 5th start
19:18–0–0	Hambletonian	Great Britain	B.h. 1792	King Fergus x Grey Highflyer by Highflyer	1796 Sweepstakes, ran off course
19:18–1–0	Old Man	Argentina	Ch.h. 1901	Orbit x Moissonneuse by Dollar	1904 Premio Comparación, 2nd
19:18–0–0	Squanderer	India	B.h. 1973	Valoroso x Milky Way by Scamperdale	1976 Colts Trial Stakes, 3rd
18:17–1–0	Botafogo	Argentina	Ch.h. 1914	Old Man x Korea by Raeburn	1918 Gran Premio Carlos Pellegrini, 2nd
18:17–1–0	Brigadier Gerard	Great Britain	B.h. 1968	Queen's Hussar x La Paiva by Prince Chevalier	1972 Benson & Hedges Gold Cup, 2nd
18:17–0–0	Gradisco	Venezuela	B.h. 1960	Show Ring x Gradara by Orsenigo	
16:15–1–0	The Flying Dutchman	Great Britain	Br.h. 1846	Bay Middleton x Barbelle by Sandbeck	1850 Doncaster Cup, 2nd
15:14–0–1	Sysonby	United States	B.h. 1902	Melton x Optime by Orme	1904 Sheepshead Bay Futurity, 3rd
14:13–1–0	Ahmad	Argentina	Br.h. 1975	Good Manners x Azyade by Churrinche	1979 Premio America, 2nd
14:13–1–0	Camarine	Great Britain	Ch.m. 1828	Juniper x Rubens mare by Rubens	Maiden race, 2nd
14:13–1–0	Rico	Argentina	B.h. 1919	Picacero x Realeza by Old Man	1923, 2nd
13:12–0–0	Ka Shock Do	New Zealand	Gr.m. 1987	Engagement x Nursery Rhyme	1991 Presidents Cup, 5th
12:11–0–0	Alba	Germany	B.h. 1927	Wallenstein x Arabis by Ard Patrick	
12:11–0–0	Invasor	Argentina	B.h 2002	Candy Stripes x Quendom by Interprete	2005 UAE Derby, 4th
12:11–1–0	Isinglass	Great Britain	B. h. 1890	Isonomy x Deadlock by Wenlock	1893 Lancashire Plate, 2nd
12:11–0–0	La Vraie Reine	United States	B.m. 1848	Sovereign x Veracity by Pacific	Withdrawn from 4-mile heat race
11:10–1–0	Atlantic Jewel	Australia	B.m. 2008	Fastnet Rock x Regard by Zabeel	2013 Underwood Stakes, 2nd
11:10–0–0	Awesome Feather	United States	B.m. 2008	Awesome of Course x Precious Feather by Gone West	2012 Breeders' Cup Ladies Classic, 6th
11:10–0–0	Baaeed	Great Britain	B.h. 2018	Sea The Stars x Agareed, by Kingmambo	2022 Champion Stakes, 4th
11:10–0–1	Galopin	Great Britain	Br.h. 1872	Vedette x Flying Duchess by The Flying Dutchman	1874 Middle Park Plate, 3rd
11:10–1–0	Imi	Hungary	B.h. 1953	Internezzo x Minci by Mannamead	
11–10–1–0	Leonatus	United States	B.h. 1880	Longfellow x Semper Felix by Phaeton	Maiden Stakes, 2nd
11:10–1–0	Queen of Trumps	Great Britain	Br.m. 1832	Velocipede x Princess Royal by Castrel	1835 Scarborough Stakes, 2nd (attacked by dog)
11:10–0–0	Ruffian	United States	Dk b/br.m. 1972	Reviewer x Shenanigans by Native Dancer	1975 Match race against Foolish Pleasure, DNF
11:10–0–1	Wheel of Fortune	Great Britain	B.m. 1869	Adventurer x Queen Berths by Kingston	1879 Great Yorkshire Stakes, 3rd
10:9–1–0	Alleged	United States	B.h. 1974	Hoist the Flag x Princess Pout by Prince John	1977 St. Leger Stakes, 2nd
10:9–1–0	Divine Proportions	United States	B.m. 2002	Kingmambo x Myth to Reality by Sadler's Wells	2005 Prix Jacques Le Marois, 2nd
10:9–1–0	Don John	Great Britain	B.h. 1835	Waverley x Comus mare by Comus	1839 Port Stakes, 2nd
10:9–0–0	Dubai Millennium	Great Britain	B.h. 1996	Seeking The Gold x Colorado Dancer by Shareef Dancer	1999 Epsom Derby, 7th
10:9–1–0	Espirita	Argentina	Ch.m. 1907	Old Man x Espuma by Wagram	
10:9–1–0	Forli	Argentina	Ch.h. 1963	Aristophanes x Trevisa by Advocate	1967 Citation Handicap, 2nd
10:9–0–1	Horse Chestnut	South Africa	Ch.h. 1995	Fort Wood x London Wall by Col Pickering	1998 Morris Lipschitz Juvenile Plate, 3rd
10:9–1–0	Majestic Prince	United States	Ch.h. 1966	Raise a Native x Gay Hostess by Royal Charger	1969 Belmont Stakes, 2nd
10:9–1–0	Phone Trick	United States	Dkb/br.h. 1982	Clever Trick x Over the Phone by Finnegan	1986 Tom Fool Stakes, 2nd
10:9–0–0	Stopshoppingdebbie	United States	Dkb/br.m. 2010	Curlin x Taste the Passion by Wild Again	2014 L.A Woman Stakes, 5th
10:9–1–0	West Australian	Great Britain	B.h. 1850	Melbourne x Mowerina by Touchstone	1852 Criterion Stakes, 2nd
9:8–0–0	Big Game	Ireland	Gr.h. 2000	Darshaan x Daltawa by Miswaki	1942 New Derby, 6th
9:8–1–0	Dalakhani	Ireland	B.h. 1939	Bahram x Myrobella by Tetratema	2003 Irish Derby, 2nd
9:8–1–0	Dante	Great Britain	Br.h. 1942	Nearco x Rosy Legend by Dark Legend	1945 2000 Guineas Stakes, 2nd
9:8–0–0	Derek	Brazil	Ch.h. 1978	Kublai Khan x Epinette by Blackamoor	1982 Grande Prêmio Taça de Ouro, 18th
9:8–0–0	Devi's Bag	United States	Dkb/br.h. 1981	Halo x Ballade by Herbager	1984 Flamingo Stakes, 4th
9:8–1–0	Donatello II	France	Ch.h. 1934	Blenheim x Delleana by Clarissimus	1937 Grand Prix de Paris, 2nd
9:8–1–0	Herold	Germany	Br.h. 1917	Dark Ronald x Hornisse by Ard Patrick	1920 Henkel-Rennen (Deutsches 2000 Guineas), 2nd
9:8–1–0	Horometer	Canada	Br.g. 1931	Hourless x Star Pal by North Star	1934 William Hendrie Memorial Handicap, 2nd
9:8–1–0	King Glorious	United States	Dkb/br.h. 1986	Naevus x Glorious Natalie by Reflected Glory	1989 Gold Tush, 2nd
9:8–1–0	Mistress Ford	France	B.m. 1933	Blandford (IRE) x Polly Flinders II by Teddy	1936 Poule d'Essai des Pouliches, 2nd
9:8–0–0	Sea the Stars	Ireland	B.h. 2006	Cape Cross x Urban Sea by Miswaki	2008 Maiden race, 4th
9:8–1–0	Sicambre	France	Br.h. 1948	Prince Bio x Sif by Rialto	1950 Prix Morny, 2nd
9:8–1–0	Smarty Jones	United States	Ch.h. 2001	Elusive Quality x I'll Get Along by Smile	2004 Belmont Stakes, 2nd
9: 8–0–1	Sun Chariot	Ireland	B.m. 1939	Hyperion x Clarence by Diligence	
9 :8–1–0	Trastevere	Peru	B.h. 1965	Agamenon x Libertina by Leading Light	1968 Clásico José Olaya, 2nd
8: 7–0–1	Anita Peabody	United States	B.m. 1925	Luke McLuke x La Dauphine by The Tetrarch	1927 Schuylerville Stakes, 3rd
8: 7–0–0	Big Brown	United States	B.h. 2005	Boundary x Mien by Nureyev	2008 Belmont Stakes, DNF
8: 7–0–1	Bleeker Street	United States	Gr.m. 2018	Quality Road x Lemon Liqueur by Exchange Rate	2022 Diana Stakes, 3rd
8: 7–1–0	Capablanca	Argentina	B.h. 1921	The Panther x Sixpenny II by William the Third	
8: 7–1–0	El Gran Senor	United States	B.h. 1981	Northern Dancer x Sex Appeal by Buckpasser	1984 Epsom Derby, 2nd
8:7–0–1	Élite	Argentina	Ch.m. 1951	Seductor x Eme by Lord Wembley	1955 Gran Premio de San Isidro, 3rd
8:7–0–1	Grand Parade	Ireland	Blk.h. 1916	Orby x Grand Geraldine by Desmond	1918 Moulton Stakes, 3rd
8:7–1–0	Graustark	United States	Ch.h. 1963	Ribot x Flower Bowl by Alibhai	1966 Blue Grass Stakes, 2nd
8:7–0–0	Grozny	Peru	Gr.h.1995	Privato x Lady Tere by Niobrara	1998 Gran Premio Nacional Augusto B. Leguia, 7th
8:7–0–0	Hula Dancer	United States	Gr.m. 1960	Native Dancer x Flash On by Ambrose Light	1963 Prix de Diane, 5th
8:7–0–1	King Kamehameha	Japan	B.h. 2001	Kingmambo x Manfath by Last Tycoon	2004 Keisei Hai, 3rd
8:7–1–0	Kingman	United Kingdom	B.h. 2011	Invincible Spirit x Zenda by Zamindar	2014 2000 Guineas Stakes, 2nd
8:7–1–0	Macaroni	United Kingdom	B.h. 1860	Sweetmeat x Jocose by Pantaloon	1862 Debut race
8:7–1–0	Mihono Bourbon	Japan	Ch.h. 1989	Magnitude x Katsumi Echo by Charlet	1992 Kikuka Sho, 2nd
8:7–0–0	Reel	United States	Gr.m. 1838	Glencoe x Gallopade by Catton	
8:7–0–0	Rock Fall	United States	Dkb/br.h. 2011	Speightstown x Renda by Medaglia d'Oro	2014 Maiden race, 8th
8:7–1–0	Sandford Lad	Ireland	Ch.h. 1970	St Alphage x Hill Queen by Djebe	1973 Berkshire Stakes, 2nd
8:7–1–0	Sea Bird	France	Ch.h. 1962	Dan Cupid x Sicalade by Sicambre	1964 Grand Critérium, 2nd
8:7–0–0	Set Fool	Chile	B.h. 1983	Settlement Day x Trima by El Tirol	1987 Gran Premio Internacional, 4th
8:7–0–0	Shakespeare	United States	B.h. 2001	Theatrical x Lady Shirl by That's a Nice	2005 Breeders' Cup Turf
8:7–1–0	Sinndar	Ireland	B.h. 1997	Grand Lodge x Sinntara by Lashkari	2000 Ballysax Stakes, 2nd
8:7–0–1	Sircat Sally	United States	Dkb/br.m. 2014	Surf Cat x Sister Sally by In Excess )	2017 San Clemente Handicap, 3rd
7:6–1–0	St Patrick	Great Britain	Ch.h. 1817	Walton x Dick Andrews mare by Dick Andrews	1821 Fitzwilliam Stakes, 2nd
7:6–1–0	Lexington	United States	B.h. 1850	Boston x Alice Carneal by Sarpedon (GB)	1854 Jockey Club Purse, 2nd
7:6–1–0	Partner	Great Britain	Ch.h. 1718	Jigg x Sister to Mixbury, by Curwen's Bay Barb	1728 race, 2nd
7:6–0–0	Barbaro	United States	B.h. 2003	Dynaformer x La Ville Rouge by Carson City	2006 Preakness Stakes, DNF
7–6–1–0	Eternal Rule	Canada	Dkb/br.g. 2008	Tribal Rule x Eternal Legend By Gold Legend	2012 Bold Venture Stakes, 2nd
7:6–0–0	Val d'Or	France	B.h. 1902	Flying Fox x Wandora by Bruce	1905 Grand Prix de Paris, 4th
6:5–1–0	Agnes Flora	Japan	B.m. 1987	Royal Ski x Agnes Lady by Remand	1990 Yushun Himba, 2nd
6:5–1–0	Cesario	Japan	Blk.m. 2002	Special Week x Kirov Premiere by Sadler's Wells	2005 Oka Sho, 2nd
6:5–1–0	Chaffinch	Argentina	B.h. 1926	Buen Papel x Chaica by Américo	
6:5–0–1	Graydar	United States	Gr.h. 2009	Unbridled's Song x Sweetest Smile by Dehere	2012 Allowance race, 3rd
6:5–0–0	Hoist the Flag	United States	B.h. 1968	Tom Rolfe x Wavy Navy by War Admiral	1970 Champagne Stakes, DQ to last (finished 1st)
6:5–0–0*	Justify	United States	Ch.c. 2015	Scat Daddy x Stage Magic by Ghostzapper	2018 Santa Anita Derby, DQ
6:5–1–0	Kingston Treasure	Hong Kong	Gr.g. 1995	Spectacular Love x Attempting by Try My Best	1999 Camellia Divided Handicap, 2nd
6:5–1–0	Majesticperfection	United States	B.h. 2006	Harlan's Holiday x Act So Noble by Wavering Monarch	2010 Maiden race, 3rd
6:5–0–0	Maple Leaf Mel	United States	Gr.r. 2020	Cross Traffic x City Gift by City Place	2023 Test Stakes, DNF
6:5–1–0	Meld	Great Britain	B.m. 1952	Alycidon x Daily Double by Fair Trial	1954 Debut race, 2nd
6:5–1–0	Sebring	Australia	Ch.h. 2005	More Than Ready x Pure Speed by Flying Spur	2008 Champagne Stakes, 2nd
6:5–1–0	Sinhalite	Japan	Dkb/br.m. 2013	Deep Impact x Singhalese by Singspiel	2016 Oka Sho, 2nd
6:5–1–0	Voltaire	Great Britain	Br.h. 1826	Blacklock x mare by Phantom	1829 St Leger Stakes, 2nd
6:5–0–0	Zilzal	United States	Ch.c 1986	Nureyev x French Charmer by Le Fabuleux	1989 Breeders' Cup Mile, 6th
5:4–0–1	Apalachee	United States	B.h. 1971	Round Table x Moccasin by Nantallah	1974 2000 Guineas, 3rd
5:4–1–0	Barremina	Panama	Ch.h. 1971	Royal Medal x Bacacay by Moslem	Clásico Louis Martínez, 2nd
5:4–1–0	Bletchingly	Australia	Br.h. 1970	Biscay x Coogee (GB) by Relic (USA)	
5:4–0–0	Celtíbero	Argentina	B.h. 1957	Cardanil II x Raza by Bahram	
5:4–1–0	Cipayo	Argentina	B.h. 1974	Lacydon x Tsarina by Tamerlane	1977 Gran Premio Jockey Club, 2nd
5:4–0–1	Common	Great Britain	Ch.h. 1888	Isomony x Thistle by Scottish Chief	1891 Eclipse Stakes, 3rd
5:4–0–0	Flanders	United States	Ch.m. 1992	Seeking The Gold x Starlet Storm by Storm Bird	1994 Matron Stakes, DQ (finished 1st)
5:4–0–0	Heil! (known as Yamilé after 1940)	Argentina	B.m. 1936	Congreve x Hillah by Sardanapale	
5:4–0–0	Janelle Monae	Brazil	B.m. 2017	Agnes Gold x Just Lucky by Spend A Buck	2022 Marie G. Krantz Memorial Stakes, 4th
5:4–0–0	Magnum Moon	United States	B.h. 2015	Malibu Moon x Dazzling Song by Unbridled's Song	2018 Kentucky Derby, 19th
5:4–1–0	Mr. Zippity Do Dah	United States	Ch.h. 1984	Exuberant x Catchy Little Tune by Daryl's Joy	1986 Whas Stakes, 2nd
5:4–0–1	Noblesse	Ireland	Ch.m. 1960	Mossborough x Duke's Delight by His Grace	1963 Prix Vermeille, 3rd
5:4–1–0	Riddlesworth	Great Britain	Ch.h. 1828	Emilius x Fillagree by Soothsayer	1831 Epsom Derby, 2nd
5:4–0–0	Ted Noffey	United States	Gr.r. 2023	Into Mischief x Streak of Luck by Old Fashioned	2026 Dwyer Stakes, 5th
5:4–0–1	Tudo Azul	Brazil	B.h. 2003	Boatman x One Flash Blue by Blue Diamond	2006 Grande Prêmio Mario de Azevedo Ribeiro, 3rd
5:4–1–0	Uruguayo	Argentina	B.h. 1968	Pronto x Unna by Cyrus the Great	
4:3–1–0	Blandford	Ireland	Br.h. 1919	Swynford x Blanche by White Eagle	1921 Windsor Castle Stakes, 2nd
4:3–0–0	Buddha	United States	Gr.h. 1999	Unbridled's Song x Cahooters by Storm Cat	2001 Maiden race, 10th
4:3–0–0	Demarchelier	Great Britain	B.h. 2016	Dubawi x Loveisallyyouneed by Sadlers Wells	2019 Belmont Derby, DNF
4:3–0–1	Willydoit	New Zealand	B.g. 2021	Tarzino x Willamette by More Than Ready	2024 – First Race
4:3–0–0	Four Wheel Drive	United States	B.h. 2017	American Pharoah x Funfair by More Than Ready	2020 Allowance at Churchill Downs, 7th
4:3–0–0	Ghirlandaio	Chile	Ch.h. 1951	Nasr-Ed-Din x Latina by Medicis	1954 Clásico Nacional Ricardo Lyon, 4th
4:3–0–0	Guatán	Argentina	B.h. 1941	Floretista x Guayaca by Cabalista	1944 Premio Guilermo Kemmis, 5th
4:3–1–0	Justin Milano	Japan	B.h. 2021	Kizuna x Margot Did by Exceed And Excel	2024 Tōkyō Yūshun, 2nd
4:3–1–0	Obelisco	Argentina	Ch.h. 1920	Fripon x Old England by Old Man	
4:3–0–1	Salahudin	United States	Dk b/br. 2024	Uncle Mo x Weekend Strike by Smart Strike	2026 Breeders' Cup Juvenile, 3rd
4:3–0–0	Smooth Roller	United States	B.g. 2011	Hard Spun x Catch the Moment by Unbridled	2015 Harry F. Brubaker Stakes, 4th
4:3–1–0	Violence	United States	Dkb/br.h. 2010	Medaglia d'Oro x Violent Beauty by Gone West	2013 Fountain of Youth Stakes, 2nd
4:3–0–0	Wild Dayrell	Great Britain	Br.h. 1852	Ion x Ellen Middleton by Bay Middleton	1855 Doncaster Cup, DNF
4:3–0–0	Zumayita	Argentina	Gr.m. 1929	Marón x Zumaya by Le Temps	
3:2–0–1	Bois Roussel	Great Britain	Br.h. 1935	Vatout x Plucky Liege by Spearmint	1938 Grand Prix de Paris, 3rd
3:2–0–1	Marista	Argentina	Ch.h. 1958	Nigromante x Marie Stuart by Pont Leveque	1961 Gran Premio Polla de Potrillos, 3rd
3:2–0–1	New Year's Day	United States	Br.h 2011	Street Cry x Justwhistledixie by Dixie Union	2013 Maiden race, 3rd
3:2–0–0	Nureyev	United States	B.h. 1977	Northern Dancer x Special by Forli	1980 2000 Guineas Stakes, DQ (finished 1st)
3:2–0–0	Wilkes	France	Ch.h. 1952	Court Martial x Sans Tares (GB) by Sind	

*The disqualification of Justify in the 2018 Santa Anita Derby is currently under appeal.

== $10 million prizewinning horses ==
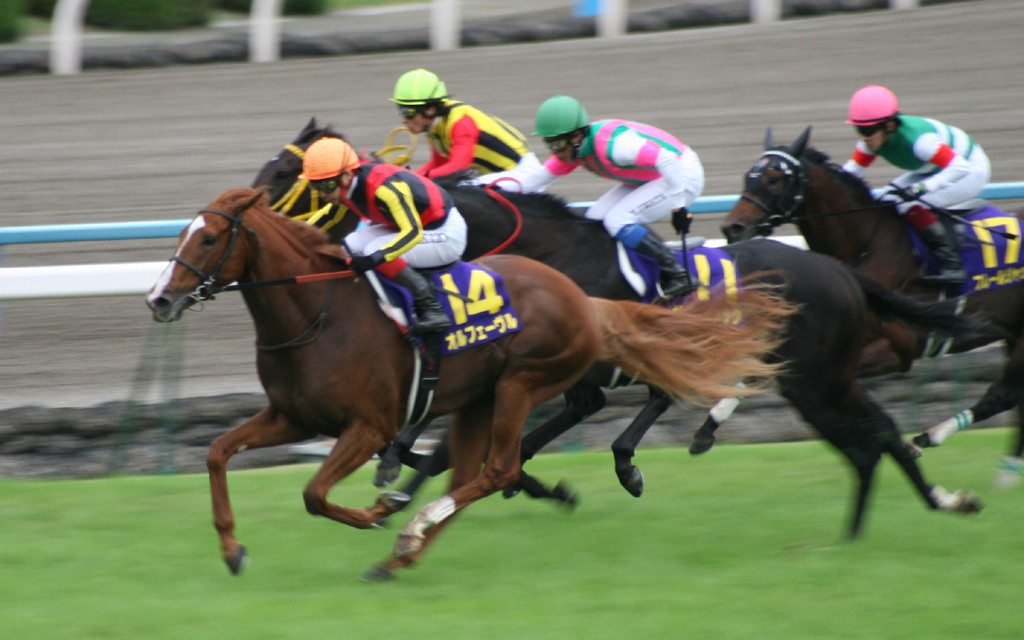
Orfevre swoops on by to win the 72nd Kikuka Sho.

The following horses have earned over $10 million in prize money. Most of them raced (at least in part) in Japan, Hong Kong, Australia and/or Dubai due to large purse sizes. Where applicable, the conversion to US$ was made at the time the horse raced so does not reflect current exchange rates. Different methodologies for currency conversions may result in slightly different rankings. This list may not reflect recent results.

Horse	Trained	Earnings	GBP	USD	JPY
Romantic Warrior (IRE)	Hong Kong	HK$254,665,697 (Note: Includes local and overseas earnings.) + A$3,083,750 (AUS) + ¥183,780,000 (JPN) + $2,110,000 (UAE) + $3,500,000 (KSA)	£25,732,933	$32,425,267	¥5,195,546,937 (Note: Value calculated using exchange rates rather than an official earnings record, generally for the last year the horse raced.)
Forever Young (JPN)	Japan	¥294,200,000 (JPN) + $20,900,000 (KSA) + $4,180,000 (UAE) + $4,770,000 (USA)	£24,746,998	$31,758,590	¥4,936,993,600
Golden Sixty (AUS)	Hong Kong	HK$167,170,600 (HK)	£16,316,172	$21,462,495	¥3,414,521,054
Gentildonna (JPN)	Japan	¥1,326,210,000 (JPN) + $4,000,000 (UAE)	£12,224,036	$18,468,392	¥1,726,030,400
Orfevre (JPN)	Japan	¥1,344,084,000 (JPN) + €2,159,880 (FR)	£12,185,908	$19,005,276	¥1,576,213,000
Ushba Tesoro (JPN)	Japan	¥463,884,000 (JPN) + $9,600,000 (UAE) + $250,000 (USA) + $5,500,000 (KSA)	£14,900,191	$18,787,874	¥2,601,311,100
Winx (AUS)	Australia	A$26,451,175 (AUS)	£14,564,743	$19,049,695	¥2,124,029,272
Equinox (JPN)	Japan	¥1,756,556,000 (JPN) + $3,480,000 (UAE)	£14,088,378	$17,760,228	¥2,215,446,100
Ka Ying Rising (NZ)	Hong Kong	HK$137,135,900 + A$7,549,000 (AUS)	£13,094,466	$17,704,040	¥2,797,769,835
Arrogate (USA)	United States	$11,422,600 (USA) + $6,000,000 (UAE)	£13,622,542	$17,422,600	¥1,951,331,200
Almond Eye (JPN)	Japan	¥1,519,563,000 (JPN) + $3,600,000 (UAE)	£13,100,836	$17,608,586	¥1,915,263,900
Buena Vista (JPN)	Japan	¥1,386,433,000 (JPN) + $1,000,000 (UAE)	£10,262,876	$17,018,548	¥1,478,869,700
T. M. Opera O (JPN)	Japan	¥1,835,189,000 (JPN)	£10,587,690	$16,200,337	¥1,835,189,000
Thunder Snow (IRE)	Great Britain	£135,518 (GB) + €451,420 (FR) + $13,600,000 (UAE) + $810,000 (USA) + €60,000 (IRE)	£12,671,800	$16,511,476	¥1,783,239,408
Kitasan Black (JPN)	Japan	¥1,876,843,000 (JPN)	£11,454,079	$16,575,955	¥1,876,843,000
Mishriff (IRE)	Great Britain	£1,426,273 (GB) + $10,160,000 (KSA) + €757,464 (FR) + $2,900,000 (UAE) + €50,000 (IRE) + $200,000 (USA)	£11,859,305	$16,034,853	¥1,763,833,830
Gun Runner (USA)	United States	$13,988,500 (USA) + $2,000,000 (UAE)	£12,238,136	$15,988,500	¥1,774,723,500
Voyage Bubble (AUS)	Hong Kong	HK$130,705,975 (HK)	£12,303,805	$15,342,317	¥2,666,590,106
Bella Nipotina (AUS)	Australia	A$22,757,624 (AUS)	£9,851,109	$15,667,332	¥2,184,877,917
Rebel's Romance (IRE)	Great Britain	£668,730 (GB) + $5,165,190 (UAE) + $150,000 (KSA) + €400,000 (GER) + $5,835,000 (USA) + $1,425,000 (QAT) + HK$7,280,000 (HK)	£12,119,185	$15,525,209	¥2,482,783,660
Gold Ship (JPN)	Japan	¥1,397,767,000 (JPN)	£9,757,292	$15,040,217	¥1,397,767,000
Country Grammer (USA)	United States	$841,320 (USA) + $7,000,000 (KSA) + $7,080,000 (UAE)	£11,568,831	$14,921,320	¥1,955,140,560
Nature Strip (AUS)	Australia	A$20,236,785 (AUS) + £283,550 (GB)	£11,414,651	$14,853,094	¥1,735,744,257
California Chrome (USA)	United States	$6,662,650 (USA) + $8,090,000 (UAE)	£9,658,673	$14,752,650	¥1,667,049,450
Panthalassa (JPN)	Japan	¥301,700,000 (JPN) + $1,450,000 (UAE) + $10,000,000 (KSA)	£11,828,776	$14,418,903	¥1,844,663,200
Enable (GB)	Great Britain	£2,899,890 (GB) + €232,000 (IRE) + €6,857,000 (FR) + $2,200,000 (USA)	£10,724,320	$14,062,824	¥1,562,643,348
Midnight Bisou (USA)	United States	$3,971,520 (USA) + $10,000,000 (KSA)	£10,559,123	$13,971,520	¥1,536,448,054
Beauty Generation (NZ)	Hong Kong	HK$106,233,750 (HK)	£10,543,080	$13,842,236	¥1,476,649,125
Vodka (JPN)	Japan	¥1,304,876,000 (JPN) + $257,500 (UAE)	£7,442,957	$13,147,826	¥1,333,565,800
Senor Buscador (USA)	United States	$1,744,427 (USA) + $10,000,000 (KSA) + $1,200,000 (UAE)	£10,150,048	$12,944,427	¥1,825,423,095
Deep Impact (JPN)	Japan	¥1,454,551,000 (JPN)	£7,268,753	$12,825,285	¥1,454,551,000
Do Deuce (JPN)	Japan	¥1,752,639,000 (JPN) + €9,100 (FR) + $250,000 (UAE)	£10,576,819	$12,554,242	¥1,775,035,800
Mr Brightside (NZ)	Australia	A$18,898,547 (AUS)	£10,275,538	$12,888,881	¥1,817,590,000
Victoire Pisa (JPN)	Japan	¥595,954,000 (JPN) + €9,100 (FR) + $6,000,000 (UAE)	£7,899,679	$12,891,734	¥1,085,040,500
Via Sistina (IRE)	Great Britain; Australia	£433,804 (GB) + €97,150 (FR) + €180,000 (IRE) + A$18,051,650 (AUS)	£9,840,401	$12,657,254	¥2,092,359,544
Redzel (AUS)	Australia	A$16,444,000 (AUS)	£9,426,982	$12,280,122	¥1,233,300,000
Shahryar (JPN)	Japan	¥804,819,000 (JPN) + $4,860,000 (UAE) + £56,682 (GB) + $810,000 (USA)	£9,698,509	$12,026,482	¥1,518,459,600
Emblem Road (USA)	Saudi Arabia	$10,817,200 (KSA) + £4,000 (FR) + $1,200,000 (UAE)	£9,019,024	$12,021,492	¥1,575,176,096
Espoir City (JPN)	Japan	¥1,023,197,000 (JPN)	£7,113,203	$11,443,812	¥1,023,197,000
Smart Falcon (JPN)	Japan	¥990,736,000 (JPN)	£5,846,770	$11,470,635	¥990,736,000
Lys Gracieux (JPN)	Japan	¥887,381,000 (JPN) + HK$6,800,000 (HK) + A$3,000,000 (AUS)	£9,575,715	$11,023,327	¥1,217,200,100
Chrono Genesis (JPN)	Japan	¥1,101,714,000 (JPN) + $1,000,000 (UAE)	£8,282,825	$11,224,682	¥1,204,735,400
Vermilion (JPN)	Japan	¥1,132,859,000 (JPN) + $300,000 (UAE)	£5,378,603	$11,139,125	¥1,168,607,500
Contrail (JPN)	Japan	¥1,195,294,000 (JPN)	£8,327,137	$10,992,642	¥1,195,294,000
Verry Elleegant (NZ)	New Zealand; Australia	NZ$17,000 (NZ) + A$14,849,775 (AUS) + €13,650 (FR)	£8,150,350	$10,975,811	¥1,319,215,651
California Spangle (IRE)	Hong Kong	HK$83,796,256 + $870,000 (UAE)	£8,074,275	$10,530,465	¥1,513,751,041
Exultant (IRE)	Hong Kong	HK$83,491,900 (HK)	£8,057,771	$10,742,530	¥1,231,884,411
Makybe Diva (GB)	Australia	A$14,526,685 (AUS)	£5,795,064	$10,767,186	¥1,238,226,390
Hokko Tarumae (JPN)	Japan	¥1,078,706,000 (JPN) + $300,000 (UAE)	£6,849,518	$10,703,689	¥1,114,591,800
Viva Pataca (GB)	Hong Kong	HK$83,197,500 + $1,000,000 (UAE)	£5,891,919	$10,694,793	¥863,873,164
Highland Reel (IRE)	Ireland	€95,955 (IRE) + £1,911,713 (GB) + €1,485,900 (FR) + $2,827,300 (USA) + A$220,000 (AUS) + HK$23,295,000 (HK) + $300,000 (UAE)	£7,513,355	$10,530,964	¥1,181,047,613
Curlin (USA)	United States	$6,796,800 (USA) + $3,705,000 (UAE)	£5,291,024	$10,501,800	¥1,050,180,000
Lucky Sweynesse (NZ)	Hong Kong	HK$81,979,100 (HK)	£7,813,398	$10,499,809	¥1,679,177,905
Admire Moon (JPN)	Japan	¥740,462,000 (JPN) + HK$5,900,000 (HK) + $3,000,000 (UAE)	£4,316,045	$10,205,890	¥1,187,727,000
Zenno Rob Roy (JPN)	Japan	¥1,115,608,000 (JPN) + £101,200 (GB)	£5,791,478	$10,418,242	¥1,135,651,500

Bold refers to active racehorses.

Most of the above horses belong to the Nearco sireline, mostly through the branches established by Sunday Silence and Northern Dancer. However, Curlin, Arrogate, Winx, Hokko Tarumae, Panthalassa, and Gun Runner descend instead from the Native Dancer sire line through Mr. Prospector. Both Nearco and Native Dancer were grandsons of Phalaris.

=== North American records ===
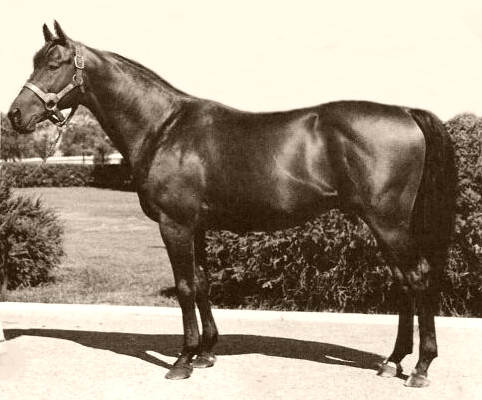
Citation, the first racehorse to win one million dollars

Miss Woodford was the first to earn over $100,000, in 1885. In 1951, Citation became the first horse to win one million dollars. In 1979, Affirmed became the first horse to break the two million dollar barrier, finishing his career with earnings of $2.3 million. Purses began to increase sharply soon afterwards thanks in large part to the Breeders' Cup. John Henry was the first to surpass $5 million, earning just shy of $6.6 million by the end of his career in 1984. Curlin in 2008 became the first to earn $10 million. California Chrome broke this record in 2016 with career earnings of $14.8 million, and was in turn surpassed by Arrogate when he won the 2017 Dubai World Cup to take his career earnings over $17 million.

The overall progression of the leading North American is as follows (year is when the record was broke, although earnings reflect lifetime earnings):

- 1845: Peytona – $62,400
- 1861: Planet – $69,700
- 1881: Parole – ($69,891) (final earnings $82,184)
- 1882: Hindoo – $71,875
- 1882: Parole – $82,184
- 1885: Miss Woodford – $118,270
- 1889: Hanover – $118,872
- 1892: Kingston – $138,891
- 1893: Domino – $193,550
- 1920: Man o' War – $249,465
- 1923: Zev – $313,639
- 1930: Gallant Fox – $328,165
- 1931: Sun Beau – $376,744
- 1940: Seabiscuit – $437,730
- 1942: Whirlaway – $561,161
- 1947: Assault – $675,470
- 1947: Armed – $817,475
- 1947: Stymie – $918,485
- 1950: Citation – $1,085,760
- 1956: Nashua – $1,288,565
- 1958: Round Table – $1,749,869
- 1964: Kelso – $1,977,896
- 1979: Affirmed – $2,393,818
- 1980: Spectacular Bid – $2,781,608
- 1981: John Henry – $6,591,860
- 1988: Alysheba – $6,679,242
- 1996: Cigar – $9,999,815
- 2008: Curlin – $10,501,800
- 2016: California Chrome – $14,752,650
- 2017: Arrogate – $17,422,600

== See also ==
- List of racehorses
- List of historical horses
- Miller's Guide
- Repeat winners of horse races
- Triple Crown of Thoroughbred Racing
