= Condado (horse) =

Champion racehorse in Puerto Rico

- Breed: Thoroughbred
- Sire: Gadstick
- Grandsire: Broomstick
- Dam: Purupupu
- Damsire: Allumeur
- Sex: Stallion
- Country: Puerto Rico
- Color: Chestnut
- Breeder: Teodoro Viera
- Owner: José Coll Vidal
- Trainer: Pablo Suárez
- Record: 213:152-41-9
- Earnings: $15,651

Major wins
- Clásico Comercio (1936); Governor's Cup (1937); Clásico José E. Benedicto (1937); Clásico Navidad (1937,1938)

Honours
- Puerto Rico Horse Racing Hall of Fame (1958)

Condado (Foaled 1934-Death Date Unknown) was a champion racehorse in Puerto Rico who was best known for his statistical achievements on the track which included having 152 career victories and at his peak a winning streak of 43 straight victories.

== Background ==
Condado was a chestnut colt foaled in 1934 in Potrero by breeder Teodoro Viera. He was owned by José Coll Vidal, the owner of Puerto Rican champions Cofresi and Camarero, and was trained by Pablo Suárez. He was out of American dam Purupupu, whose sire was a French-bred named Allumeur, while her dam, Olga Virginia, was a US-bred horse. Condado’s sire was an American stallion named Gadstick who descended from Ben Brush, a Hall of Fame champion racehorse who won the 1896 Kentucky Derby.

== Career ==
Condado made his debut on July 17, 1936, in the Clásico Luis Muñoz Rivera, a race where many other Puerto Rican champions such as Galgo Jr made their debuts. He finished third and broke his maiden nine days later on July 26, 1936, in a time of 1:06.30 for the 1000-meter distance. His two-year-old season lasted seven races, and his first major victory came in the Clásico Comercio. The following year at the age of three, he began a streak where he ran against the greatest in Puerto Rico such as Yaucono and Chorisbar, who were the only horses to ever win more races than him. At the age of three, he ran 39 times and lost once, beating out Galgo Jr's 30 victories as a three-year-old, Yaucono's 32-win three-year-old season, and Chorisbar's 37-win six-year-old season. The only horse who ever won more races in one year was Lenoxbar, who won 46 times in 56 races. The following year at the age of four, Condado lost one out of 31 starts.

On February 5, 1939 at Quintana Racetrack he ran against imported racehorses and won under jockey Guillermo Escobar with 105 pounds of weight aboard. Throughout his career, he was given very light weights maxing out at 125 pounds, compared to other Puerto Rican champions such as Galgo Jr, who withstood weights as high as 132 pounds during his career. Condado won against imported horses with jockey Raúl Sánchez aboard under 95 pounds at 1 mile and 70 yards in 1:49.10.

Later in his career at the ages of six and seven, he ran 81 times, winning 59 races. During this period, he set track records at distances of 1000 meters to 1 1/16 miles. One of the records was at Quintana while the other four came at Las Monjas. He won 2 of 21 starts at age 8 and ran very selectively in his final season, racing 5 times and winning 3 of them. By the end of his career, he raced 213 times with 152 victories and finished third or better 202 times.

== Pedigree ==
Pedigree of Condado (PR), chestnut stallion, 1934
Sire Gadstick (USA) 1929	Broomstick; 1901	Ben Brush; 1893	Bramble; 1875
Sire Gadstick (USA) 1929	Broomstick; 1901	Ben Brush; 1893	Roseville; 1888
Sire Gadstick (USA) 1929	Broomstick; 1901	Elf; 1893	Galliard; 1880
Sire Gadstick (USA) 1929	Broomstick; 1901	Elf; 1893	Sylvabelle; 1887
Sire Gadstick (USA) 1929	Gadfly; 1920	Chicle; 1913	Spearmint; 1903
Sire Gadstick (USA) 1929	Gadfly; 1920	Chicle; 1913	Lady Hamburg; 1908
Sire Gadstick (USA) 1929	Gadfly; 1920	Gadiola; 1914	Cylgad; 1909
Sire Gadstick (USA) 1929	Gadfly; 1920	Gadiola; 1914	Mineold; 1901
Dam Purupulpu	Allumeur; 1911	Meddler; 1890	St.Gatien; 1881
Dam Purupulpu	Allumeur; 1911	Meddler; 1890	Busybody; 1881
Dam Purupulpu	Allumeur; 1911	Strike A Light; 1896	Donovan; 1886
Dam Purupulpu	Allumeur; 1911	Strike A Light; 1896	Fulse; 1888
Dam Purupulpu	Olga Virginia; 1920	Celt; 1905	Commando; 1898
Dam Purupulpu	Olga Virginia; 1920	Celt; 1905	Maid Of Erin; 1895
Dam Purupulpu	Olga Virginia; 1920	Censure; 1910	Star Ruby; 1892
Dam Purupulpu	Olga Virginia; 1920	Censure; 1910	Dicipline; 1906
