= Dojima Fighter =

Japanese racehorse

- Sire: Pencil Pusher
- Grandsire: Apalachee
- Dam: Dojima Gold
- Damsire: Rheingold
- Sex: stallion
- Foaled: 1992
- Died: 2003
- Country: Japan
- Color: Bay
- Breeder: Toshihiro Matsumoto
- Owner: Kazuo Dojima → Riko Koike
- Trainer: Masahiro Sato ( Miura ) → Yoshihiko Tezuka
- Record: 34: 29-1-1
- Earnings: ¥26,300,000

Dojima Fighter (Japanese:ドージマファイター, foaled, March 12, 1992 – September 2003) was a Japanese thoroughbred racehorse . He holds the record for the longest winning streak by a Japanese Thoroughbred at 29 consecutive flat race victories. After failing to win at the national level in five starts, he set his record winning streak at two local horse racing tracks, Utsunomiya Racecourse and the Ashikaga Racecourse, where he never lost in 29 starts. His nickname was the 'Reconstructing Star' reflecting the social conditions at that time as the tracks he raced at were on the verge of being destroyed.

== Background ==
Dojima Fighter was sired by Pencil Pusher, a well-bred stallion sired by Apalachee, the top rated 2-year-old in both Ireland and Britain whose sire and dam were both Hall Of Famers and Horse Of The Year award recipients. Round Table considered by some to be the greatest grass horse bred in America won Horse Of The Year in 1958 and three times was Champion Grass Horse. His dam was Moccasin who won Horse Of The Year as a two-year-old filly. On Dojima Fighter's dam side Dojima Gold also never won a race failing in both of her two races. Her sire was Rheingold who won the Prix de l'Arc de Triomphe in 1973. Physically he was a heavy set horse weighing around 1,160 pounds his whole career which caused hoof problems especially later in his racing career.

== Career ==
He made his debut in Fukushima Racecourse in July 1995. He ended up finishing eighth of twelve horses that day. He ran a total of five times as a two-year-old at the national racing level. But he failed to win finishing up with a third place finish at Nakayama Racecourse before injury sidelined him for the rest of the season. When he returned he opted not to run at the national level was dropped into the local horse racing level. For the rest of his career he would only race at two local racetracks. Ashikaga Racecourse, and Utsunomiya. In his first year he ran eight times without a loss. He repeated the effort as a five-year-old winning exactly eight races at the two tracks again. In 1998 at the age of six he peaked managing 10 victories by the end of the season. His winning streak became a point of tourism at Ashikaga Racecourse especially with twice as many people in attendance at the track when he raced.

== Retirement ==
When it came time for Dojima Fighter to start his 7-year-old season he had won 26 consecutive races. Which was already a record for purebred thoroughbreds in Japan but was tied for the all-time record with Hakko March an Anglo Arabian racehorse. He would go on to break the record and win his 27th straight race. But it wasn't very easy, in the race he lost a shoe on his right front leg when the gates opened. He was still able to win the race even with the handicap but the injuries from that race meant that it was both his first and last race as a 7-year-old. He returned briefly as an 8-year-old in the year 2000 running just under a year after 27th straight race and winning. It took him another 6 months for him to run again and win his 29th straight. Another injury to his right front leg later he finally was retired in October 2001 11 months after he had run his last race. He lived out the rest of his life at the Niikappu Horoshiri Riding Club as an off the track thoroughbred but an accident during a competition in 2003 proved fatal and he had to be euthanised. That same year Ashikaga Racecourse where he had won plenty of his races was shut down.
