= Galgo Jr. =

Thoroughbred racehorse

- Sire: Galgo
- Grandsire: Fair Play
- Dam: War Relief
- Damsire: Granite
- Sex: Stallion
- Foaled: 1928
- Died: December 21, 1936
- Country: Puerto Rico
- Color: Bay
- Record: 159: 137-17-1
- Earnings: $31,738

Major wins
- Clásico Luis Muñoz Rivera (1930); Governor's Cup (1931)

Honors
- Puerto Rico Horse Racing Hall of Fame (1958)

Galgo Jr. (March 17, 1928 – December 21, 1936) was a champion Thoroughbred racehorse that was raised and raced in Puerto Rico notable for being one of the first champions of Puerto Rico and for being the former record holder for most wins by a racehorse and joined former record holder for most wins in a single season with Jorrocks.

== Background ==
Galgo Jr. was a bay colt named after his sire, Galgo. Galgo was originally named Check when he raced in America, but he was claimed at old Aqueduct Racetrack by Ramon Garcia in 1924. He won once in 8 starts. Once in Puerto Rico, he was renamed Galgo, the Spanish word for Greyhound, and produced multiple Puerto Rican champions like the white horse Nevado. His best offspring was Galgo Jr. His grandsire was Fair Play, who sired Man o' War.

== Racing career ==
Galgo Jr. was born on Vieques Island, and both of his parents were imported from America. Throughout his career, he raced at two racetracks in Puerto Rico: Quintana Hippodrome and Las Monjas Hippodrome. His first race (and victory) came on July 17, 1930, in the Clásico Luis Muñoz Rivera. In the race, he set a stakes record running the 6-furlong race in 1:19.00 — at the time, the record was hard to break (Sirena broke it 9 years later with the time of 1:18.60). By the end of his two-year-old season, he had racked up 21 wins in 22 starts. His three-year-old season, however, was by far his best. His wins included the Governor's Cup, the second jewel of the Puerto Rican Triple Crown. At his peak he won 39 straight races, which at the time was a record. However, in the latter half of the 1930s, Cofresi reset the record with 49 straight victories. but, in 1931, he tied a record for most wins in a single season, sharing it with the Australian "iron-gelding" Jorrocks, although other horses such as Chorsibar, Yaucano and Lenoxbar surpassed this as well. Just like in his two-year-old season, Galgo Jr. only lost a single time. By the end of his three-year-old season, he had raced 63 times, winning 61 of them.

At seven, he won 25 races. He also established other smaller winning streaks such as a 15 race, 13 race (twice), and 10 race winning streaks over the course of his career. He set or equalled 16 track records at Quintana Hippodrome and Las Monjas Hippodrome that ranged from 5 1/2 furlongs to 9 furlongs, sometimes breaking his own records. By the end of his six-year-old season, he became the first horse in history to break 100 career wins — since then, six other horses have broken 100 victories, and three have won more races than Galgo Jr: Chorisbar, Condado, and Yaucano.

| Year | Starts | Won | Earnings |
|---|---|---|---|
| 1930 | 22 | 21 | $7,757 |
| 1931 | 31 | 30 | $9,244 |
| 1932 | 28 | 19 | $6,109 |
| 1933 | 16 | 14 | $2,209 |
| 1934 | 21 | 18 | $2,771 |
| 1935 | 29 | 25 | $2,270 |
| 1936 | 11 | 9 | $949 |

== Later career and death ==
Galgo Jr. raced well into his eight-year-old season. By the end of that year, he had racked up 9 victories in 11 starts. On December 21, 1936, while he was in his training box at Las Monjas Hippodrome, he collapsed and died of a heart attack. By then, he had raced 158 times, winning 136 times, finishing second 17 times and finishing third once, with $31,738 in earnings, a record at the time.

In 1958, he one of six inaugural racehorses to be inducted into the Puerto Rico Racing Hall Of Fame, alongside Camarero, Yaucono, Perla Fina, Condado, and Bachiller.

== Pedigree ==
Pedigree of Galgo Jr, bay colt, 1928
| Sire Galgo 1921 | Fair Play; 1905 | Hastings; 1893 | Spendthrift; 1873 |
| Sire Galgo 1921 | Fair Play; 1905 | Hastings; 1893 | Cinderella; 1885 |
| Sire Galgo 1921 | Fair Play; 1905 | Fairy Gold; 1896 | Bend Or; 1877 |
| Sire Galgo 1921 | Fair Play; 1905 | Fairy Gold; 1896 | Dame Masham; 1889 |
| Sire Galgo 1921 | Chit Chat; 1913 | Rock Sand; 1900 | |
| Sire Galgo 1921 | Chit Chat; 1913 | Rock Sand; 1900 | Sainfoin; 1887 |
| Sire Galgo 1921 | Chit Chat; 1913 | Chinkara; 1893 | Galopin; 1872 |
| Sire Galgo 1921 | Chit Chat; 1913 | Chinkara; 1893 | Raker; 1881 |
| Dam War Relief 1919 | Granite; 1908 | Rockton; 1897 | Meddler; 1890 |
| Dam War Relief 1919 | Granite; 1908 | Rockton; 1897 | Brown Princess; 1886 |
| Dam War Relief 1919 | Granite; 1908 | Adriutha; 1901 | Clifford; 1890 |
| Dam War Relief 1919 | Granite; 1908 | Adriutha; 1901 | Aranza II; 1895 |
| Dam War Relief 1919 | Kopje; 1912 | Kroonstad; 1900 | Kilwarlin; 1884 |
| Dam War Relief 1919 | Kopje; 1912 | Kroonstad; 1900 | Sabra; 1888 |
| Dam War Relief 1919 | Kopje; 1912 | Gironde; 1899 | Clover; 1886 |
| Dam War Relief 1919 | Kopje; 1912 | Gironde; 1899 | Georgette; 1887 |
