= Miller's Guide =

Miller's Guide is an Australian annual sporting publication that lists sporting world records, gives a comprehensive history of results of the major Australian horse races and provides a form guide to all entries for the Melbourne and Caulfield Cups. Initially known as J.J. Miller's Sporting Pamphlet when first published in 1875, it was later changed to J.J. Miller's Sporting Annual, and over its 134 years it has become known as The Miller's Guide. It is sometimes referred to as the Australian racing bible. The 2015/16 edition was to be the final printed edition due to high printing costs and a drop in readership, but after purchasing the rights to the guide, online bookmaker BetEasy revived the print edition in 2019.

== History ==
First published in 1875 the Miller's Guide is named after its founder, English born James J. Miller who was only 16 years old when he stepped off a ship in Melbourne in 1848. Miller tried his hand on the goldfields and although failing to dig up a fortune, he had been greatly impressed by the way the diggers enjoyed a wager.

Shortly after returning to Melbourne he started Australia's first sweepstakes and the business boomed until the early 1880s when the law decreed that all sweeps were illegal. But Miller's main interest revolved around bookmaking.

He had first started taking bets in the late 1850s and soon progressed to be one of Victoria's best known and trustworthy in what was seen then as an even more risky business than it is today. An advertisement in the 1887 pamphlet read: "Mr. J.J. Miller Has Books Open and will lay the odds on all the leading races of the current year. Gentlemen favouring him with their business may depend on the best possible prices compatible with the certainty that settling day will arrive. I may remark I have been before you for thirty years, and during the last 10 years I have received and disbursed of trust monies alone over a Half Million sterling." As a bookmaker he obviously judged the value of his customers wishing to place early bets on the Caulfield Cup and Melbourne Cups and to further their interest decided to produce a list with race form for the entries. Thus the original Miller's Pamphlet was born.

== Today's publication ==
The content of the present day Miller's Guide contains results of nearly 300 Group and Listed Australian horse races in 744 pages, whereas originally it was 80 pages and listed about a dozen races and carried limited information on other sporting codes. All codes of football, cricket, golf, tennis and many more modern sports also get greater coverage in the today's Miller's Guide. As with J.J. Miller's first publication, a detailed form guide for all entries in the Caulfield Cup and Melbourne Cup is provided.

== Publishers ==
Miller had his own print works at 72 Collins Street, Melbourne, and produced the book himself. He later moved his print works to 17 John Street Clifton Hill. The book remained in the ownership of the Miller family until it was taken over by The Herald and Weekly Times in 1952.

A longtime editor of the book at the HWT was Bill "Taffy" Combes who produced the book for the HWT until 1976. It was then produced for the HWT by Bill Henry until 1984. The book was then produced by Dennis Huxley for the HWT from 1985 until 1990 when he purchased the masthead from the HWT. He has produced it since then and has also started a website.

== Trivia ==
Editions from over 100 years carried gems of information such as:

- Haircutting - In a match race between Prof. Herrod of New York and Prof. Devereux of Brooklyn (each two subjects), Herrod won. He finished the first man in 4m 30s, and the second in 2m 40s.
- Butchering - Bullock Dressed in 3m. 40s, go-as-you-please style, John Malone, Chicago, Ill., 18 August 1883.
- Tailoring- A Tweed suit turned out in three hours 23 min., by London and American Tailoring Co., Oct. 1886.
- Filed under Ratting in the 1887 annual it stated: 25 rats killed in 1min 28s Jimmy Shaw's dog Jacko, London, Eng., 20 August 1861; 60 rats, 2m 43s Jacko, London, 29 July 1862; 100 rats, 5m 28s, Jacko, London, 1 May 1862; 200 rats, 14m 37s Jacko, London, 10 June 1862; 1,000 rats, less than 100 minutes, Jacko, London, 1 May 1862.
