= Don Paco =

Puerto Rican Thoroughbred racehorse

- Sire: Casanova Star
- Grandsire: A.P. Indy
- Dam: Miss Frisky Dancer
- Damsire: Seattle Dancer
- Sex: Stallion
- Foaled: April 23, 2008
- Country: United States
- Color: Chestnut
- Breeder: Romualdo Olazabal
- Owner: Establo Olazabal
- Trainer: Gilberto Escobar
- Record: 38-21-4-5
- Earnings: $475,944

Major wins
- Puerto Rican Derby (2011); Governors Cup (2011); San Juan Cup (2011); Clasico Antonio Mongil, Jr. (2011); Clasico Antonio Fernandez Castrillon (2011); Clasico Luis Munoz Marin Stakes (2012); Clasico Antonio R. Barcelo Stakes (2012)

Don Paco (foaled April 23, 2008) is a race horse who won the Puerto Rican Triple Crown as well as racking up 13 straight victories from the age of 2 to 3.

== History ==
=== 2-year-old season ===
At the age of 2, Don Paco would race a total of 5 times with mild success but nothing like what was to come. His first start he tried chasing the leaders but weakened and wasn't able to do better than 3rd. However, his next start making up a 3 length gap between him and the leaders and holding off all comers to win his first race 1 3/4 lengths. The race was so impressive that he was put in stakes company in just his third career start running in the Puerto Rico Futurity. In the first quarter, he was over 10 lengths behind the leaders and simply was not able to make to much ground and was a very well-beaten third place. Losing by a 7 whole lengths behind El Negro Torres and Tono M. But that would be the last loss of his 2-year-old year a win in an allowance race was a good prep for his final and biggest win of his 2-year-old year the Copa Navidad. He would have a rematch with Tono M and this time he didn't drop as far back going only 7 1/2 lengths behind. By the far turn, he swept by the entire field and held off Tono M to win the race by 1 1/4 lengths.

=== Triple Crown Bid ===
Going into the race Don Paco would not run in any stakes races instead he ran in 4 allowances races prepping up for the Puerto Rican Derby. In-fact his first start was a match race that he won by going gate to wire a far cry from his normal style of coming from the back. He would have more horses race against him in the following 3 match races however they simply were not a challenge he would cruise home every single time.

=== Puerto Rican Derby ===
The Puerto Rican Derby was not a huge field just like Don Paco's previous races that year, and the race seemed on paper to be just as easy as before. None of the horses were stakes winners except for him. The race was on he was a close third for the race sitting comfortably in third place for most of the race and then he snuck through into first by the time they hit the far turn. After that it was all over he stayed tucked on the rail while the rest of the horses scrambled for sloppy seconds on the outside. Don Ryan tried to catch him in the late game but could only get within 2 3/4 lengths of Don Paco.

=== Governors Cup ===
The Governors Cup would have a slight increase in the competition having 6 challengers to try and defeat Don Paco including Antonio R. Matos Classic winner Guitarra Templada. At the start of the race, Italy Pride and Castador would set the lead by a clear margin of 6 lengths. At its highest, the two fighting front runners were in front by 7 lengths. But even with such a huge lead over there competition, Don Paco was able to catch up to them by the final turn. Then by the finish line, he opened 6 lengths of his own winning the second jewel even more impressively than the first one.

=== San Juan Cup ===
Don Paco entered the San Juan Cup having previously defeated every other horse in the field. At the start, El Negro Torres drifted in early sandwiching Don Paco in between him and Nube Negra. After that El Negro Torress took a clear lead opening up 4 lengths. But Salvaje quickly chased after him and the two fought for first-place early. However this time Don Paco was right behind them only a length behind the two front runners all he had to do was wait for them to tire. By the far turn, he swept by, and after that it simply a parade as he opened up even further not even being whipped just being aggressively hand ridden by Alexis Feliciano. Every jewel of the triple crown he won by a huger margin then he did the previous race and in the San Juan Cup he won by 8 1/2 lengths. His Triple Crown victory made him the ninth horse to win the Puerto Rican Triple Crown.

=== Rest of his career ===
Following his Triple Crown campaign, Don Paco extended his winning streak by capturing two Grade 2 stakes races, the Antonio Mongil Jr. Classic and the Antonio Fernandez Castrillion Classic. He then competed in the Caribbean International Classic, entering the race on a 13-race winning streak. During the race, Don Paco raced just behind the leaders while Heisenberg set the pace. Don Paco moved into contention early but faded to fifth place around the far turn as Heisenberg maintained the lead throughout the race and won.

Despite this, he would continue his career after the defeat. Although he won additional stakes races, he did not repeat the extended winning streak of his Triple Crown season. He did rack up one more graded stakes win in the Grade 2 Antonio R. Barcelo Classic Stakes at the age of 4 but besides that, all of his victories were simply in allowance company. After a 4th in the Grade 1 4th of July Cup, he was sidelined for a whole year. When he returned he simply was not the same. He would only win 2 times over the course of his 5 and 6-year-old seasons. Both in allowance company. He would run his last race in the Antonio Fernandez Castrillon Classic against fellow Puerto Rican triple crown winner Arquitecto, a horse who had defeated him 3 other times in stakes company. This would be the fourth time as Arquitecto ran away with the race while Don Paco was a well-beaten third by over 16 lengths. After that, he was retired to stud.

== Pedigree ==
Casanova Star x Miss Frisky Dancer by Seattle Dancer (his broodmare sire is a 1/2 brother to Triple Crown winner Seattle Slew).
