= Leviathan (American horse) =

American thoroughbred racehourse

- Sire: The Flag Of Truce
- Grandsire: Goldfinder
- Dam: Unknown*
- Damsire: Unknown*
- Sex: Gelding
- Foaled: 1793; Goochland County, Virginia
- Color: Grey
- Breeder: Dr.Turpin
- Owner: Edmund Brooke, John Tayloe III
- Record: 30:24(38 Heats)-1-?

Leviathan (foaled in 1793; death date unknown) was an American Thoroughbred racehorse considered one of the best horses of the late 1700s and early 1800s. He was also one of the first successful American geldings in racing history with almost every other great horse from that time period either being a stallion or a mare. He also holds the longest winning streak in American racing history winning 23 consecutive races from 1797 to 1801 with at-least 15 of these races being heat races meaning he won at least 38 consecutive heats.

== Background ==
Leviathan was bred by Turpin in Goochland Country Virginia sometime in 1793. He was described as a big and strong grey standing upwards of 16 hands with speed and strength helping him carry high weights over long distances. His grey coat came from his sire The Flag Of Truce and his grandsire Goldfinder who both were grey as well. The Flag Of Truce also produced (Bond's) First Counsul a horse who like Leviathan went on his own winning streak that lasted 21 consecutive races. His dam side has never been confirmed as it was lost early in his life as he was considered an overgrown and unexceptional horse during the beginning of his career. There have been theories that his dam was by a horse named Medley who was also described as a durable grey but these traits could've also been inherited from The Flag Of Truce who possessed the same attributes.

In his early career, he was owned by Col. Miles Selden but ran under the name of Flagelator. How many races he ran throughout his career is not very clear, but what is known is he did not perform very well. The first race he ran was in the spring meet of 1796 at Tappahannock where he finished fifth.

== Winning Streak ==
In 1797 when Leviathan was four-years-old he would be given to Edmund Brooke and assumed the name of Leviathan. He won seven races consecutively with him, After these wins the now five-year-old Leviathan was sold for £225, to Col. John Tayloe III. This would cause him to miss the first days Virginia Jockey Club Purse. His first race under his two owners together would be the second days Virginia Jockey Club Purse

Date	Age	Distance	Race	Track	Purse
Oct 3, 1798	5	2 miles	Virginia Jockey Club Purse Day 2 (Heats)	Hanover Court House	£45
Oct 30, 1798	5	4 Miles	Jockey Club Purse (Heats)	Annapolis	£60
Apr 20, 1799	6	3 miles	Second Days Purse (Heats)	Richmond	£60
May 9, 1799	6	3 miles	Second Days Purse (Heats)	Petersburg	£45
May 15, 1799	6	3 miles	Second Days Purse (Heats)	Tappahannock	£45
Oct 4, 1799	6	4 miles	Jockey Club Purse (Heats)	Hanover Court House	£70
Oct 17, 1799	6	3 miles	Second Day Jockey Club Purse (Heats)	Richmond	£60
Oct 30, 1799	6	3 miles	Second Day Jockey Club Purse (Heats)	Petersburg	£50
May 21, 1800	7	4 miles	Jockey Club Purse (Heats)	Richmond	£120
May 27, 1800	7	4 miles	Jockey Club Purse (Heats)	Petersburg	£100
Jun 10, 1800	7	4 miles	Jockey Club Purse (Heats)	Tappahannock	£70
Oct, 15 1800	7	4 miles	Jockey Club Purse (Heats)	Fairfield	£135
Nov, 4 1800	7	4 miles	Jockey Club Purse (Heats)	Alexandria	£75
May 12, 1801	8	4 miles	Jockey Club Purse (Heats)	Richmond	£135
Jun, 10, 1801	8	5 miles	Match Race (carried 180 pounds his opponent carried 100)	Unknown	Unknown
Oct, 18, 1801	8	4 miles	Jockey Club Purse (Heats)	Richmond	£150

These wins ranged from 2 miles up to an incredible 5 miles defeating the best horses that could be offered to him at the time like Little Medley, Minerva, and being the only horse to defeat Lee Boo a horse who won 11 straight races after his defeat to Leviathan with the exception of his 13th race where he broke down after winning the first heat.

His winning streak was snapped 6 days after winning both heats of the Richmond Jockey Club Purse when in the second heat in a race at Fredericksburg when his jockeys stirrup leather broke snapping the streak. It was said after the race that "it was clear Leviathan had lost his spirits." A week later in a rematch against Lee Boo he was easily beaten. In April 1802 he was transferred Maj.James Mcpherson's for £180. Sources vary on the success he had after his winning streak was over. Some say he never won another race after the streak ended and he retired with 30 starts and 24 overall victories. While others imply he won "several" races in the south away from his stomping grounds in Virginia. His career concluded in February 1803 at the age of 10 in Charleston South Carolina when he ran two races. The first one was a Jockey Club Purse where he finished second carrying 130 pounds then a few days later he was distanced in a handicap race by a 3-year-old named Gallatin which is where accounts of the horse end.
