= Vuelve Candy B. =

Puerto Rican Thoroughbred racehorse

- Sire: Double Dewan
- Grandsire: Dewan
- Dam: Highly Impressive
- Damsire: High Echelon
- Sex: Stallion
- Foaled: March 6, 1988
- Country: Puerto Rico
- Colour: Gray
- Breeder: J. Adalberto Roig
- Owner: Establo Nori-Annette
- Trainer: Candelario "Candy" Bonilla
- Record: 85: 63-12-6
- Earnings: $1,035,789

Major wins
- Copa Gobernador (1991); Derby Puertorriqueño (1991); Copa San Juan (1991); Copa Budweiser (1991); Clasico Dia del Veterano (1992, 1993)

Awards
- Puerto Rican Horse of the Year (1991 & 1992)

Honours
- Puerto Rican Horse Racing Hall of Fame (1996); Highest money earner in Puerto Rican racing history

Vuelve Candy B (March 6, 1988– August 9, 1998) was arguably one of the most popular champions in Puerto Rican Thoroughbred racing. The grey colt won the Puerto Rican triple crown in 1991. He also won Puerto Rico's Horse of the Year award twice (1991, 1992) He is the first and only horse in Puerto Rico to win over one million dollars and the horse with most stakes wins (16).

== On the track ==
Candy B. was foaled in Potrero Hermosura in Puerto Rico. As a yearling in 1989 he was acquired by the RI-JE-SU Stable for the sum of $20,000. Originally named "Oiste Candy B," he won his debut race on August 8, 1990, while ridden by Edwin Castro. The horse finished his two-year-old season (1990) with 3 first places, 2 second places and one third-place finish in six races.

The horse's owner was arrested and his horses were confiscated and later sold in a federal auction. He was acquired by Luito Hernandez, owner of the Est. Nori Annette, in a federal auction by $75,000. His new owner decided to change the name of the horse to Vuelve Candy B. That year, Vuelve Candy B. won 13 straight races including the three stakes that compose the Puerto Rican Triple Crown ridden by Alexis Feliciano. He also won the Clasico Dia de la Raza and Clasico Budweiser that same year. He came in first place in the Clasico Dia del Veterano but was disqualified to second place in favor of Tatra Voltage due to hampering in the final stretch. In December 1991, Vuelve Candy B. represented Puerto Rico in the Clasico del Caribe which was celebrated at the El Nuevo Comandante horse track in Puerto Rico. Vuelve Candy B., ridden by Julio A. Garcia, finished third but a few days later was declared the official winner of the race because of the disqualification of Venezuelan horses Rio Chamita and Landrea due to positive testing of illegal substances.

In 1992 at the age of four, Vuelve Candy B. continued his dominance by winning 14 out of 15 races. Among them were the Clasico Eugenio María de Hostos, the Clasico Dia de las Madres, the Clasico Antonio R Barcelo, the Clasico Dia de La Raza and the Clasico Dia del Veterano. He lost his last race of the year in the Cofraternity Cup to By Pass, a Panamanian horse.

In 1993, Vuelve Candy B. won another 19 races (13 of them consecutively) and setting a record for the most stakes won in Puerto Rican Horse Racing. He battled Imbuia Pajoqui, a Puerto Rican filly, in many of these stakes races creating sensation among the Puerto Rican horse racing fans.

As a six-year-old, Vuelve Candy B. won the Clasico Eugenio María de Hostos by defeating 1993 Clasico del Caribe winner, Verset's Jet. This was Vuelve Candy B. only win against Verset's Jet who won his next 6 races against Vuelve Candy B.

In May 1994, Vuelve Candy B. won his 16th and last stakes race by winning his third Clasico Dia de las Madres, beating Imbuia Pajoqui by a nose. After this, Vuelve Candy B. kept racing but began to win less and less. In December 1994, Vuelve Candy B. won his sixty third and last race while ridden by Wilfredo Rohena.

In 1995, he participated in the Clasico Luis Muñoz Marín but did not finish due to an injury.

== Stud record ==
Vuelve Candy B. went on to a career as sire producing Alejandro Luis Too, Roxana Milagros, Rayo Dorado, and El Curro among others. But in 1998, he was brought back to El Nuevo Comandante. On the morning of August 9, 1998 Vuelve Candy B. suffered a severe injury in his stall and was humanely euthanized.

Vuelve Candy B. ended his racing career with 63 wins in 85 starts. He came in second 12 times, third 6 times, and fourth 3 times. He ran only one race out of the money, when he did not finish in his last start. His total career earnings amounted to $1,035,789.

In the last few years, Hipodromo Camarero celebrates the Clasico Vuelve Candy B a stakes race dedicated to this great Puerto Rican champion. Vuelve Candy B's remains are buried in the infield at Hipodromo Camarero.

== Popular Culture ==
On Bad Bunny's album Nadie Sabe lo que va a pasar manana, one of the tracks is named after Vuelve Candy B.
