= Maple Leaf Mel =

American Thoroughbred racemare

- Breed: Thoroughbred
- Sire: Cross Traffic
- Grandsire: Unbridled's Song
- Dam: City Gift
- Damsire: City Place
- Sex: Mare
- Foaled: February 17, 2020; New York
- Died: August 5, 2023; Saratoga Race Course; Saratoga Springs, New York
- Color: Grey/Roan
- Breeder: Joe Fafone
- Owner: August Dawn Farm
- Trainer: Melanie Giddings
- Jockey: Joel Rosario
- Record: 6: 5-0-0
- Earnings: $399,650

Major wins
- Seeking the Ante Stakes (2022); East View Stakes (2023); Miss Preakness Stakes (2023); Victory Ride Stakes (2023)

Maple Leaf Mel (February 17, 2020 – August 5, 2023) was an American Thoroughbred racemare. She was undefeated in her first 5 starts, before suffering a fatal breakdown in the 2023 Test Stakes.

She was owned by August Dawn Farm, which is owned by former NFL coach Bill Parcells. He named the horse after her trainer Melanie Giddings, a cancer survivor.

== Background ==
Maple Leaf Mel was foaled on February 17, 2020, by City Gift, a mare by City Place, and was sired by Cross Traffic.

In September 2021, she was sold at the Keeneland Yearling sale to Paul Neatherlin for $18,000. In May 2022, she was sold as a juvenile to August Dawn Farm for $150,000 at the Fazig-Tipton Midlantic Auction.

== Career ==
=== 2022 ===
On August 10, Maple Leaf Mel made her debut at Saratoga. 2 weeks later, she won the Seeking the Ante Stakes on August 26.

=== 2023 ===
After a lengthy layoff, Maple Leaf Mel made her 3-year-old debut on March 24, with a victory in the East View Stakes at Aqueduct.

On May 19, she made her only start outside of New York in the Miss Preakness Stakes at Pimlico, winning from gate to wire.

On July 8, she won the Victory Ride Stakes at Belmont Park.

==== Death ====
On August 5, Maple Leaf Mel was going for her 6th straight win in the Test Stakes at Saratoga. She was clear from the field by the 1/16 pole, but suddenly collapsed just in front of the finish line. She suffered a broken right front leg, and was euthanized on the spot. Jockey Joel Rosario suffered facial abrasions, and was taken to Albany Medical Center for stitches.

Pretty Mischievous was declared the winner of the race, however her connections gifted the flower blanket to trainer Melanie Gidding, and was displayed at the horse's stall in the days following.

In May 2024, Maple Leaf Mel was posthumously awarded NY-bred horse of the year.

== Record ==
Date	Track	Race Type	Finish
2 year old
8/10/2022	Saratoga	Maiden Special Weight	1st
8/26/2022	Saratoga	Seeking the Ante Stakes	1st
3 year old
3/24/2023	Aqueduct	East View Stakes	1st
5/19/2023	Pimlico	Miss Preakness Stakes	1st
7/8/2023	Belmont Park	Victory Ride Stakes	1st
8/5/2023	Saratoga	Test Stakes	DNF

== Pedigree ==
Pedigree of Maple Leaf Mel (2020-2023)
Sire Cross Traffic	Unbridled's Song	Unbridled	Fappiano
Sire Cross Traffic	Unbridled's Song	Unbridled	Gana Facil
Sire Cross Traffic	Unbridled's Song	Trolley Song	Caro
Sire Cross Traffic	Unbridled's Song	Trolley Song	Lucky Spell
Sire Cross Traffic	Stop Traffic	Cure The Blues	Stop The Music
Sire Cross Traffic	Stop Traffic	Cure The Blues	Quick Cure
Sire Cross Traffic	Stop Traffic	Save My Soul	Ima Hell Raiser
Sire Cross Traffic	Stop Traffic	Save My Soul	Somethingexciting
Dam City Gift	City Place	Storm Cat	Storm Bird
Dam City Gift	City Place	Storm Cat	Terlingua
Dam City Gift	City Place	Glitter Woman	Glitterman
Dam City Gift	City Place	Glitter Woman	Carols Folly
Dam City Gift	For My Wife	Not For Love	Mr. Prospector
Dam City Gift	For My Wife	Not For Love	Dance Number
Dam City Gift	For My Wife	Heavens To Betsy	Miswaki
Dam City Gift	For My Wife	Heavens To Betsy	Heaven's Nook
