= 1959 Kentucky Derby =

Horse race

85th Kentucky Derby
- Kentucky Derby
- Grade I stakes race
- Location: Churchill Downs
- Date: May 2, 1959
- Winning horse: Tomy Lee
- Jockey: Bill Shoemaker
- Trainer: Frank E. Childs
- Owner: Fred W. & Juliette M. Turner Jr.
- Surface: Dirt

The 1959 Kentucky Derby was the 85th running of the Kentucky Derby. The race took place on May 2, 1959.

== Full results ==
Finished	Post	Horse	Jockey	Trainer	Owner	Time / behind
1st	8	Tomy Lee	Bill Shoemaker	Frank E. Childs	Fred W. & Juliette M. Turner Jr.	
2nd	10	Sword Dancer	William Boland	J. Elliott Burch	Brookmeade Stable	
3rd	4	First Landing	Eddie Arcaro	Casey Hayes	Meadow Stable	
4th	11	Royal Orbit	William Harmatz	Reggie Cornell	Halina Gregory Braunstein	
5th	5	Silver Spoon	Raymond York	Robert L. Wheeler	Cornelius Vanderbilt Whitney	
6th	7	Finnegan	Johnny Longden	William B. Finnegan	Neil S. McCarthy	
7th	12	Dunce	Steve Brooks	Moody S. Jolley	Claiborne Farm	
8th	1A	Open View	Karl Korte	Raymond F. Metcalf	Elkcam Stable (Mackle brothers)	
9th	1	Atoll	Samuel Boulmetis	Raymond F. Metcalf	Elkcam Stable (Mackle brothers) & Lou Chesler	
10th	3	Rico Tesio	Manuel Ycaza	Joseph F. Piarulli	Briardale Farm (Anthony Imbesi)	
11th	16	Festival King	William Carstens	E. William Kuykendall	Cecil B. Fischbach	
12th	9	John Bruce	Kenneth Church	Charles P. Sanborn	Kenneth G. Marshall	
13th	6	Easy Spur	Bill Hartack	Paul L. Kelley	Spring Hill Farm	
14th	17	The Chosen One	Jimmy Combest	Norman L. Haymaker	Mrs. S. Helene Sadacca	
15th	2	Our Dad	Pete D. Anderson	Hirsch Jacobs	Patrice Jacobs	
16th	15	Die Hard	Johnny Sellers	Joseph M. Bollero	Jacnot Stable (Jack R. Hogan)	
17th	13	Troilus	Chris Rogers	Charles Peoples	Bayard Sharp	

- Winning breeder: Captain David H. Wills (U.K.)
