= 1971 in sports =

1971 in sports describes the year's events in world sport.

== Alpine skiing ==
- Alpine Skiing World Cup
  - Men's overall season champion: Gustav Thöni, Italy
  - Women's overall season champion: Annemarie Pröll, Austria

== American football ==
- 17 January − Super Bowl V: the Baltimore Colts (AFC) won 16–13 over the Dallas Cowboys (NFC)
  - Location: Miami Orange Bowl
  - Attendance: 79,204
  - MVP: Chuck Howley, LB (Dallas)
- 25 December – The Miami Dolphins defeat the Kansas City Chiefs in a divisional playoff game. The double-overtime contest is the longest game in NFL history, and the Chiefs' last home game at Municipal Stadium.
- Orange Bowl (1970 season):
  - The Nebraska Cornhuskers won 17–12 over the Louisiana State Tigers to win the AP Poll national championship after the previous #1 Texas Longhorns lost in the Cotton Bowl and the #2 Ohio State Buckeyes lost in the Rose Bowl.
- 24 October – death of Chuck Hughes, Detroit Lions wide receiver

== Association football ==
- 2 January – At the end of a Rangers–Celtic match at Ibrox Park in Glasgow, barriers at Stairway 13 give way under a mass of fans, killing 66 and injuring over 200 others.
- 30 June – death of Georgi Asparuhov (28), Bulgarian international
- Atlético Mineiro wins the first Campeonato Brasileiro Série A
- Arsenal are the English First Division champions
- England – FA Cup – Arsenal won 2–1 over Liverpool to win The Double
- European Championship Cup Final: Ajax – Panathinaikos 2–0

== Athletics ==
- August – Athletics at the 1971 Pan American Games held in Cali, Colombia
- August – 1971 European Athletics Championships held at Helsinki

== Australian rules football ==
- Victorian Football League
  - Hawthorn wins the 75th VFL Premiership (Hawthorn 12.10 (82) d St Kilda 11.9 (75))
  - Brownlow Medal awarded to Ian Stewart (Richmond)
- SANFL
  - North Adelaide 10.19 (79) defeated Port Adelaide 9.5 (59)

== Bandy ==
- 1971 Bandy World Championship is held in Sweden and won by Soviet Union.

== Baseball ==
- World Series – Pittsburgh Pirates won 4 games to 3 over the Baltimore Orioles. Game four, played on 13 October at Three Rivers Stadium in Pittsburgh, was the first night game in World Series history.

== Basketball ==
- NCAA Division I Men's Basketball Championship –
  - UCLA wins 68–62 over Villanova
  - Indiana University Hires Bob Knight as their head basketball coach.
- NBA Finals –
  - Milwaukee Bucks win 4 games to 0 over the Baltimore Bullets
- 1971 ABA Finals –
  - Utah Stars defeat Kentucky Colonels 4 games to 3; Stars defeat Indiana Pacers in division finals while Colonels defeat Virginia Squires.

== Boxing ==
- 8 March – Joe Frazier defeats Muhammad Ali at Madison Square Garden, in the first of three epic bouts between the two, to retain the World Heavyweight Championship.

== Canadian football ==
- Grey Cup – Calgary Stampeders won 14–11 over the Toronto Argonauts
- Vanier Cup – Western Ontario Mustangs won 15–14 over the Alberta Golden Bears

== Cricket ==
- 5 January, Melbourne – first-ever One Day International is played after a Test match is abandoned because of rain, Australia beating England by 5 wickets.

== Cycling ==
- Giro d'Italia won by Gösta Pettersson of Sweden
- Tour de France – Eddy Merckx of Belgium
- UCI Road World Championships – Men's road race – Eddy Merckx of Belgium

== Field hockey ==
- Men's World Cup in Barcelona, Spain
  - Gold Medal: Pakistan
  - Silver Medal: Spain
  - Bronze Medal: India
- Pan American Games (Men's Competition) in Cali, Colombia
  - Gold Medal: Argentina
  - Silver Medal: Mexico
  - Bronze Medal: Canada

== Figure skating ==
- World Figure Skating Championships –
  - Men's champion: Ondrej Nepela, Czechoslovakia
  - Ladies' champion: Trixi Schuba, Austria
  - Pair skating champions: Irina Rodnina & Alexei Ulyanov, Soviet Union
  - Ice dancing champions: Lyudmila Pakhomova & Alexandr Gorshkov, Soviet Union

== Golf ==
Men's professional

- PGA Championship – Jack Nicklaus
- Masters Tournament – Charles Coody
- U.S. Open – Lee Trevino
- British Open – Lee Trevino
- PGA Tour money leader – Jack Nicklaus – $244,491
- Ryder Cup – United States won 18½ to 13½ over Britain in team golf

Men's amateur

- British Amateur – Steve Melnyk
- U.S. Amateur – Gary Cowan

Women's professional

- LPGA Championship – Kathy Whitworth
- U.S. Women's Open – JoAnne Carner – this win made her the first person to win three different USGA individual championship events.
- Titleholders Championship – not played
- LPGA Tour money leader – Kathy Whitworth – $41,181

== Harness racing ==
- United States Pacing Triple Crown races –
  1. Cane Pace – Albatross
  2. Little Brown Jug – Nansemond
  3. Messenger Stakes – Albatross
- United States Trotting Triple Crown races –
  1. Hambletonian – Speedy Crown
  2. Yonkers Trot – Quick Pride
  3. Kentucky Futurity – Savoir
- Australian Inter Dominion Harness Racing Championship –
  - Pacers: Stella Frost
  - Trotters: Geffini

== Horse racing ==
Steeplechases

- Cheltenham Gold Cup – L'Escargot
- Grand National – Specify

Flat races

- Australia – Melbourne Cup won by Silver Knight
- Canada – Queen's Plate won by Kennedy Road
- France – Prix de l'Arc de Triomphe won by Mill Reef
- Ireland – Irish Derby Stakes won by Irish Ball
- English Triple Crown Races:
  1. 2,000 Guineas Stakes – Brigadier Gerard
  2. The Derby – Mill Reef
  3. St. Leger Stakes – Athens Wood
- United States Triple Crown Races:
  1. Kentucky Derby – Canonero II
  2. Preakness Stakes – Canonero II
  3. Belmont Stakes – Pass Catcher

== Ice hockey ==
- 13 April – death of Michel Brière (21), Canadian player with Pittsburgh Penguins
- Art Ross Trophy as the NHL's leading scorer during the regular season: Phil Esposito, Boston Bruins
- Hart Memorial Trophy for the NHL's Most Valuable Player: Bobby Orr, Boston Bruins
- Stanley Cup – Montreal Canadiens win 4 games to 3 over the Chicago Black Hawks
- World Hockey Championship
  - Men's champion: Soviet Union defeated Czechoslovakia
- NCAA Men's Ice Hockey Championship – Boston University Terriers defeat University of Minnesota-Twin Cities Golden Gophers 4–2 in Syracuse, New York
- World Hockey Association (WHA) is formed as an alternative North American professional hockey league to the NHL

== Lacrosse ==
- Cornell beats Maryland 12–6 to win the first NCAA Division I Men's Lacrosse Championship.
- The Brantford Warriors win the Mann Cup.
- The Richmond Roadrunners win the Minto Cup.
- The Victoria McDonalds win the Castrol Cup.

== Radiosport ==
- Sixth Amateur Radio Direction Finding European Championship held in Duisburg, Federal Republic of Germany.

== Rugby league ==
- 1971 Kangaroo tour of New Zealand
- 18 September – the 1971 NSWRFL season culminates in a Grand Final victory for South Sydney, defeating St George 16–10
- 1971 New Zealand rugby league season
- 1970–71 Northern Rugby Football League season / 1971–72 Northern Rugby Football League season

== Rugby union ==
- 77th Five Nations Championship series is won by Wales who complete the Grand Slam

== Snooker ==
- World Snooker Championship – John Spencer beats Warren Simpson 37–29

== Swimming ==
- 27 August – US swimmer Mark Spitz recaptures the world record in the men's 200m butterfly (long course), clocking 2:03.9 at a meet in Houston, Texas.
- 31 August – Four days after Mark Spitz broke the world record in the men's 200m butterfly (long course), West Germany's Hans-Joachim Fassnacht betters the time to 2:03.3 at a meet in Landskrona, Sweden.

== Tennis ==
- Grand Slam in tennis men's results:
  1. Australian Open – Ken Rosewall
  2. French Open – Jan Kodeš
  3. Wimbledon championships – John Newcombe
  4. U.S. Open – Stan Smith
- Grand Slam in tennis women's results:
  1. Australian Open – Margaret Court
  2. French Open – Evonne Goolagong
  3. Wimbledon championships – Evonne Goolagong
  4. U.S. Open – Billie Jean King
- Davis Cup – United States wins 3–2 over Romania in world tennis.
- Sixteen-year-old Chris Evert makes her US Open debut reaching the semifinals where she is defeated by eventual champion Billie Jean King.
- First time in 16 years that Americans won both the men's and women's title at the US Open.

== Volleyball ==
- Men and Women's European Volleyball Championship held in Italy
  - 1971 Men's European Volleyball Championship won by the USSR
  - 1971 Women's European Volleyball Championship won by the USSR
- Volleyball at the 1971 Pan American Games held in Cali, Colombia
  - Men's and women's tournaments both won by Cuba

== Multi-sport events ==
- Sixth Pan American Games held in Cali, Colombia
- Sixth Mediterranean Games held in İzmir, Turkey

== Awards ==
- ABC's Wide World of Sports Athlete of the Year: Lee Trevino, PGA Golf
- Associated Press Male Athlete of the Year – Lee Trevino, PGA golf
- Associated Press Female Athlete of the Year – Evonne Goolagong, Tennis
- Sports Illustrated Sportsman of the Year - Lee Trevino, PGA golf
