= Clásico del Caribe =

Thoroughbred Black type stakes race in Latin America

Clásico Internacional del Caribe
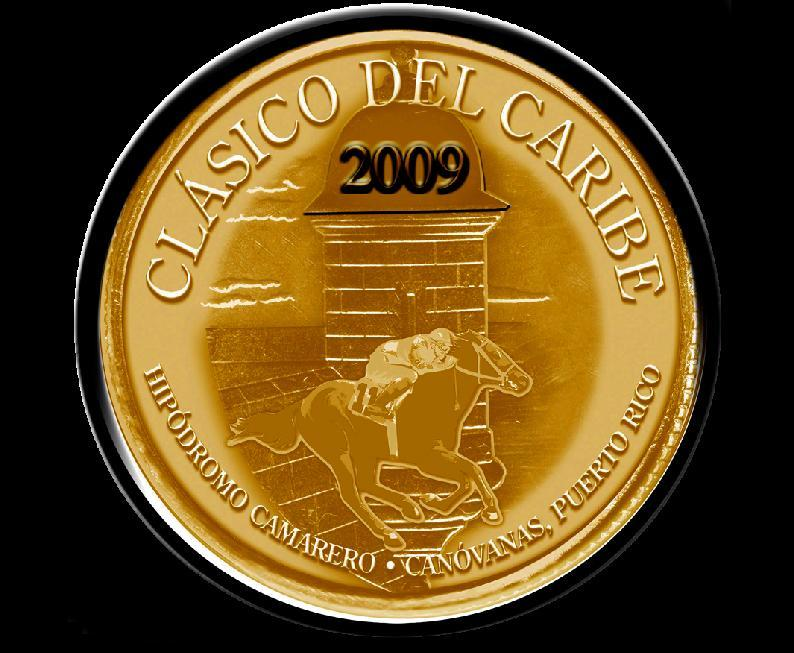
- "The Caribbean Derby"
- Class: Black Type
- Location: Variable
- Inaugurated: 1966
- Race type: Thoroughbred
- Website: Clásico del Caribe

Race information
- Distance: 1 1/8 miles (1,800 m)
- Surface: Dirt
- Track: Left-handed
- Qualification: 3-year-old
- Weight: Winner Countries: Colt/Gelding: 124 lbs Filly: 118 lbs Other Countries: Colt/Gelding/Filly: 116 lbs
- Purse: US$300,000

The Clásico Internacional del Caribe or Caribbean Derby is the thoroughbred most important black-type stakes race in the Caribbean for three-year-old thoroughbred horses, held on the month of December. The race features the best 3-year-old colts and fillies from the countries which are members of the Confederacion Hipica del Caribe.

Along with the celebration of the Clásico Internacional del Caribe, four other international races are programmed during the weekend festivities. These races are the Copa Velocidad (Caribbean Sprint Cup) (6f), Copa Dama del Caribe (Caribbean Ladies' Classic) (8.5f), Copa Invitacional del Caribe (8f), and the Confraternity Cup (10f) for 3 & up horses.

The 2017 edition of the Clásico Internacional del Caribe was held at Gulfstream Park in Hallandale, Florida. Gulfstream was the first pari-mutuel track outside of Latin American and the Caribbean to host the event. Bringing for the first time World class substance abuse rules to the most important Race of the Caribbean and a LEVELED field of competition for ALL the countries which are members of the Confederacion Hipica del CAribe.

== History ==
The Clásico Internacional del Caribe occurred after thirteen years of arduous work. Engineer Ramón Llobet Jr and Lic. Abelardo Ruiz Suria, among other distinguished Puerto Rican horsemen, created the event in 1966. This derby was designed in order to strengthen ties of friendship and brotherhood between the countries of the Caribbean. To be eligible to run in the Clásico a thoroughbred must be bred in one of the confederation member nations.

Panamá is the country with most winning in this black-type stakes with 15 followed by Venezuela with 14, Mexico with 11 and Puerto Rico with 8. Colombia and Dominican Republic has won the stakes only once. The Venezuelan jockey Emisael Jaramillo has more victories in this stake with 5 followed by Panamanian Cornelio Velásquez with 3.

Four jockeys have won both the Kentucky Derby and the Clasico Internacional del Caribe:

- Gustavo Ávila (Canonero II and Victoreado (VEN))
- Jacinto Vásquez (Genuine Risk, and Barremina (PAN))
- Laffit Pincay Jr. (Swale and Pikotazo (MEX))
- Joel Rosario (Orb and Sicotico (DOM))

Gustavo Ávila is the only jockey to win the Preakness Stakes and the Caribbean Derby (Canonero II and Victoreado (VEN)).

Five jockeys have won the Belmont Stakes and the Caribbean Derby:

- Ruben Hernandez (Coastal and Ezgarta (MEX))
- Laffit Pincay Jr. (Conquistador Cielo, Swale, Caveat and Pikotazo (MEX))
- Fernando Jara (Jazil and Ay Papá (PAN))
- Joel Rosario (Tonalist and Sicotico (DOM))
- Irad Ortiz Jr. (Creator and Jala Jala (MEX))

Venezuela is the only country to win on four consecutive occasions (with Bambera in 2009, Water Jet in 2010, Heisenberg in 2011 and El de Chine in 2012). On eleven occasions a country has managed to finish in the top two positions: Mexico with Guadamur and Gumiel (1969), Voy por Uno and Barrullero (1976) and Ezgarta and Gran Zar (1978); Venezuela with Rayo Laser and Gallardete (1987), Alighieri and Jib Dancer (1997), Water Jet and Gran Charlie (2010); Panama with Cortisol and Gotti (1999), and El Tigre Mono and Chantik (2016); and Puerto Rico with Vuelve Candy B. and Satin Charger (1991), Borrascoso and Shahid (2005), Soy Conquistador and Primero Nieto (2007). In 2009, for the first time officially two fillies occupied the top two positions: Bambera (VEN) and Vivian Record (MEX). In 1996 two fillies, Angelical (PAN) and La Supernova (PR), occupied the top two positions but the latter was disqualified to the 3rd position.

On one occasion a brother-sister team sired by the same horse were the first and second-place finishers: El Tigre Mono and Chantik finished 1–2 in 2016. Both were sired by Concerto.

The longest gap between winners of one country is of 14 years (Puerto Rico – Wiso G, 1968 to Guaybanex, 1982 and Soy Conquistador, 2007 to Tamborero, 2021).

Pikotazo (MEX) is the only winner of the Clásico del Caribe to run in the US Triple Crown Race (in the 1980 Belmont Stakes, finishing 10th).

Verset Dancer (PR) was the first filly to win the Clásico del Caribe, also establishing a track (the then Hipodromo El Comandante) and stake record (1:50:1/5). Six more fillies beside Verset Dancer have won the Clásico del Caribe: Galilea (COL) in 1984; Angelical (PAN) in 1996; Alexia (PAN) in 2001; Bambera (VEN) in 2009; Ninfa del Cielo (VEN) in 2014; and Jala Jala (MEX) in 2017.

Verset Jet (PR), winner in 1993 is a product out of Verset Dancer (PR), winner in 1983.

Rosemary Homeister Jr. is the first (and so far only) female jockey to win the Clasico del Caribe.

Five Clasico del Caribe winners went to win the Copa Confraternidad (Confraternity Cup): Verset Jet (PR) in 1994; My Own Business (VEN) in 2002 and 2003; Soy Conquistador (PR) in 2009; El Tigre Mono (PAN) in 2017; and Kukulkan (MEX) in 2019.

== Winners of the Clásico Internacional del Caribe ==
Year	Host Track	Winner	Jockey	Trainer	Owner	Time
2024	(Venezuela) La Rinconada					
2023	(Panama) Presidente Remón	(Panama) Blessed Ben Hur	Luis Saez	Mario Estevez	Stud Dani Sam	1:55.00
2022	(Venezuela) La Rinconada	(Mexico) Iniesta †	Paco Lopez	Oscar Gonzalez	Cuadra San Isidro	1:51.09
2021	(Puerto Rico) Camarero	(Puerto Rico) Tamborero	Juan Carlos Diaz	Ramon Morales	Sonata Stable	1:53.70
2020	Not held					
2019	(United States) Gulfstream Park	(Venezuela) The Brother Slew	Paco Lopez	Paul Valery	Stud Chamberi	1:51.76
2018	(United States) Gulfstream Park	(Mexico) Kukulkan †	Irad Ortiz Jr.	Fausto Gutierrez	Cuadra San Jorge	1:54.80
2017	(United States) Gulfstream Park (Note: First running outside of Latin America and the Caribbean)	(Mexico) Jala Jala ‡	Irad Ortiz Jr.	Fausto Gutierrez	Cuadra San Jorge	1:52.14
2016	(Puerto Rico) Camarero	(Panama) El Tigre Mono	Felix Salgado	Carlos Espino Guanti	Stud Marathon	1:57.33
2015	(Panama) Presidente Remón	(Panama) Calinico (Note: A formal objection by second place finisher Huitlacoche's (MEX) team was dismissed by the officials.)	Jose Lezcano	Alberto Paz Rodríguez	Stud Campo Azul	1:57:33
2014	(Venezuela) La Rinconada	(Venezuela) Ninfa del Cielo ‡	Emisael Jaramillo	Juan Carlos Ávila	Stud El Oso Yogui	1:51.00
2013	(Panama) Presidente Remón	(Mexico) Diamante Negro	Moisés Gonzalez	Ulises Silva Trejo	Cuadra Mapa	1:54:54
2012	(Puerto Rico) Camarero	(Venezuela) El de Chine	Emisael Jaramillo	Juan Carlos Ávila	Stud Monte Piedad	1:52.69
2011	(Panama) Presidente Remón	(Venezuela) Heisenberg	Emisael Jaramillo	Santos Mario Domínguez	Stud Jabces	1:54.00
2010	(Venezuela) La Rinconada	(Venezuela) Water Jet †	Emisael Jaramillo	Gustavo Delgado	Establo El Fantasma	1:48.80 (Note: Stakes Record)
2009	(Puerto Rico) Camarero	(Venezuela) Bambera ‡	Edgar Pérez	Gustavo Delgado	Establo Paula-C	1:51.60
2008	(Puerto Rico) Camarero	(Dominican Republic) Sicótico †	Joel Rosario	Eugenio Deschamps	Establo Jacksan	1:52.54
2007	(Puerto Rico) Camarero	(Puerto Rico) Soy Conquistador	Hector Berrios	Máximo Gomez	Establo Edelsam	1:50.06 (Note: New track record at the Hipodromo Camarero)
2006	(Puerto Rico) El Comandante	(Panama) Ay Papá	Fernando Jara	José Carrillo	Stud Angel C	1:53.02
2005	(Puerto Rico) El Comandante	(Puerto Rico) Borrascoso	Alexis Feliciano	Sammy Garcia	Silent Stable	1:54.60
2004	(Puerto Rico) El Comandante	(Panama) Spago †	Cornelio Velásquez	Moises Henriquez	Stud La Marea	1:52.47
2003	(Puerto Rico) El Comandante	(Panama) Cafajeste	Cornelio Velásquez	Rafael Fernández Prado	Stud Full House	1:53.73
2002	(Puerto Rico) El Comandante	(Venezuela) Gran Abuelo	Angel Castillo	Gustavo Delgado	Stud Los Grandes	1:52.27
2001	(Puerto Rico) El Comandante	(Panama) Alexia ‡	Rosemary Homeister Jr.	Eric Gittens	Stud Campo Azul	1:54.56
2000	(Puerto Rico) El Comandante	(Venezuela) My Own Business	Emisael Jaramillo	Antonio Bellardi	Stud Fantasia	1:51.76
1999	(Panama) Presidente Remón	(Panama) Cortisol	Camilo Pitty	Julio Torres	Stud Cantón	1:52.20
1998	(Trinidad and Tobago) Santa Rosa Park	(Panama) Evaristo † (Note: Disqualification of High Security (VEN) to second place)	Jesus Barria	Roberto Arango	Stud El Naranjo	1:52.22
1997	(Venezuela) La Rinconada	(Venezuela) Alighieri	Douglas Valiente	Aantonio Catanese	Stud San Omero	1:50.40
1996	(Puerto Rico) El Comandante	(Panama) Angelical ‡	Roberto Perez	Roberto Arango	Stud Nakacat	1:54.73
1995	(Dominican Republic) V Centenário	(Mexico) Locochón	Javier Matías	Juan Ruiz Garcia	Cuadra Santa Rita	1:49.2/5
1994	(Puerto Rico) El Comandante	(Puerto Rico) El Gran Nano (Note: Disqualifications of Golden End (PR) and Waki Boy (PR) due to doping)	Julio Garcia	Jesus M. Rodriguez	Establo Tres M.	N/A
1993	(Puerto Rico) El Comandante	(Puerto Rico) Verset's Jet	Juan Cintrón	Jorge Maymo	Establo Mandarria	1:51.2/5
1992	(Puerto Rico) El Comandante	(Panama) Leonardo †	Cornelio Velásquez	Alberto Paz Rodriguez	Stud La Marea	1:51.3/5
1991	(Puerto Rico) El Comandante	(Puerto Rico) Vuelve Candy B. † (Note: Disqualifications of Rio Chamita (VEN) and Landrea (VEN) due to doping)	Julio Garcia	Candelario Bonilla	Establo Nori-Annette	N/A
1990	(Venezuela) Santa Rita	(Venezuela) Don Fabián	Juan V. Tovar	César Cachazo	Stud Doña Félida	1:59.0 (Note: Held over 1 3/16 miles (1.900 meters))
1989	(Puerto Rico) El Comandante	(Panama) Pan de los Pobres	Alfredo Smith Jr.	Felix Rodriguez Jr.	Lucky Four Stables	1:53.1/5
1988	(Mexico) Caliente	(Mexico) Don Gabriel	Humberto Enriquez	Alfredo Márquez	Cuadra San Gabriel	1:51.4/5
1987	(Puerto Rico) El Comandante	(Venezuela) Rayo Laser	Rafael Torrealba	Agustin Bezara	Establo Tamborazo	1:52.3/5
1986	(Mexico) Caliente	(Venezuela) Benemérito	Douglas Valiente	Daniel Perez	Stud Gorjeadora	1:49.3/5
1985	(Venezuela) La Rinconada	(Panama) Patilargo	Victor Tejada	Felix Rodriguez Jr.	Militza y Carlos Romero	1:58.0 (Note: Held over 1 3/16 miles (1.900 meters))
1984	(Panama) Presidente Remón	(Colombia) Galilea ‡	Jorge Duarte	Manuel Munar	Haras Santa Lucía	1:57.2/5
1983	(Puerto Rico) El Comandante	(Puerto Rico) Verset Dancer ‡	Santos Navarro	Jose Maymo	Establo Pro	1:50.1/5
1982	(Puerto Rico) El Comandante	(Puerto Rico) Guaybanex	Juan Santiago	Juan M. Rodriguez	Establo Caribe	1:53.3/5
1981	(Puerto Rico) El Comandante	(Panama) El Cómico	Victor Tejada	Dario Ramos	Stud Los Novatos	1:53.3/5
1980	(Venezuela) La Rinconada	(Mexico) Pikotazo †	Laffit Pincay Jr.	Alberto Barrera	Cuadra Just Horgus	1:52.1/5
1979	Not held					
1978	(Puerto Rico) El Comandante	(Mexico) Ezgarta	Ruben Hernandez	Eusebio Razo Beltran	Cuadra Sigui	1:51.0
1977	(Puerto Rico) El Comandante	(Venezuela) Huracan Sí	Argenis Rosillo	Juan Vidal	Stud Balbico	1:54.2/5
1976	(Mexico) Las Américas	(Mexico) Voy por Uno	Gustavo Marquez	Eusebio Razo Beltran	Cuadra Ely	1:55.3/5
1975	(Venezuela) La Rinconada	(Mexico) Teziutlán	Alberto Zepeda	René Castillo	Jorge Sarur Aburto	2:02.0 (Note: Held over 1 3/16 miles (1.900 meters))
1974	(Puerto Rico) El Comandante	(Panama) Barremina	Jacinto Vásquez	Alberto Paz Rodriguez	Stud Characo	1:54.3/5
1973	(Panama) Presidente Remón	(Panama) Montecarlo †	Marcel Zuñiga	Felix Rodriguez	Dolores de Shulte	1:57.3/5
1972	Not held					
1971	(Venezuela) La Rinconada	(Mexico) Nacozareño	Guillermo Gavidia	Tomas Lopez Altamira	Cuadra Georgina	1:54.0
1970	(Panama) Presidente Remón	(Mexico) Hashin	Miguel Yanez	Jose Barba	Cuadra Carrusel	1:56.3/5
1969	(Mexico) Las Américas	(Mexico) Guadamur	Alberto Zepeda	Antonio Justo	Cuadra Carrusel	1:52.4/5
1968	(Puerto Rico) El Comandante	(Puerto Rico) Wiso G.	Carlos Lopez	Diego Acevedo	Cinderella Stud	1:54.1/5
1967	(Venezuela) La Rinconada	(Mexico) El Comanche	Ruben Contreras	Claudino Hernandez	Cuadra San Luis	1:56.3/5
1966	(Puerto Rico) El Comandante	(Venezuela) Victoreado	Gustavo Ávila	Domingo Noguera Mora	Stud Raga	1:56.1/5

A † designates a Triple Crown Winner in their native country.
A ‡ designates a filly.

- Notes:

=== Winners by country ===
Country	Wins
Panama	15
Venezuela	14
Mexico	14
Puerto Rico	8
Colombia	1
Dominican Republic	1
