= Stymie Stakes =

- Class: Listed stakes
- Location: Aqueduct Racetrack; Queens, New York
- Inaugurated: 1956
- Race type: Thoroughbred – Flat racing
- Website: www.nyra.com/aqueduct/

Race information
- Distance: 1 mile (eight furlongs)
- Track: Dirt, left-handed
- Qualification: Four-years-old & older
- Purse: US$150,000

The Stymie Stakes is an American race for Thoroughbred horses at Aqueduct Racetrack. Usually raced in late February or early March, it is open to horses age four and older. It is run on dirt over a distance of one mile and offers a purse of $150,000.

The race was named in honor of Stymie, the handicap champion of 1945. A $1,500 claimer, he was inducted into the United States Racing Hall of Fame in 1975. Making 131 career starts, Stymie won 35, placed in 33, and came in third 28 times. At the time, his earnings of $918,485 set a record. In the Blood-Horse magazine List of the Top 100 Racehorses of the 20th Century Stymie is listed as #41.

Originally a handicap race for horses age three and older, the Stymie was a Grade 3 event from 1973 through 2002 after which it became a Listed race. It was hosted by Belmont Park from inception in 1956 to 1961, and again between 1968 and 1975.

== Historic notes ==
The Kelso won the Stymie Handicap in 1962 then in 1965 won it again in what would be the final win of his career, capped off with his fifth American Horse of the Year title.

The 1972 edition of the Stymie Handicap was won by the Venezuelan longshot Canonero II who had won the 1971 Kentucky Derby and Preakness Stakes. In capturing the Stymie, Canonero II won by five lengths while equaling the North American record for a mile and an eighth.

== Records ==
Speed record:

- 1:46.20 @ 1 1/8 mi (1.8 km): Canonero II (1972) & Key To The Kingdom (1974)
- 2:00.40 @ 1 1/4 mi (2.0 km): Grace Born (1968)

Most wins:

- 2 – Kelso (1962, 1965)
- 2 – It's Academic (1989, 1990)
- 2 – More to Tell (1995, 1996)
- 2 – Ground Storm (2002, 2004)
- 2 – Turco Bravo (2015, 2016)

Most wins by a jockey:

- 4 – Jorge Velásquez (1971, 1975, 1985, 1990)
- 4 – Manuel Franco (2016, 2017, 2021, 2025)

Most wins by a trainer:

- 3 – Bruce Levine (1994, 2000, 2005)
- 3 – Gasper S. Moschera (1995, 1996, 1997)
- 3 – Gary Contessa (2008, 2015, 2016)
- 3 – Todd A. Pletcher (2006, 2010, 2019)

Most wins by an owner:

- 3 – Winning Move Stable (Sigler family) (2008, 2015, 2016)

== Winners ==
Year	Winner	Age	Jockey	Trainer	Owner	Dist.	Time	Win US$	Gr
2025	Bank Frenzy	5	Manuel Franco	Rudy R. Rodriguez	LSU Stables	1 mi (1.6 km)	1:40.29	$150,000	L
2024	Kinetic Sky	6	Jose Lezcano	Richard E. Dutrow Jr.	Sanford J. Goldfarb, Alan Khan, David Tanzman & Steven Speranza	1 mi (1.6 km)	1:37.08	$82,500	L
2023	Repo Rocks	5	Dexter Haddock	Jamie Ness	Double B Racing Stakes	1 mi (1.6 km)	1:36.75	$125,000	L
2022	Green Light Go	5	Dylan Davis	Jimmy Jerkens	Stronach Stables	1 mi (1.6 km)	1:35.43	$125,000	L
2021	Mr. Buff	7	Manuel Franco	John C. Kimmel	Chester Broman Sr. & Mary Broman	1 mi (1.6 km)	1:36.97	$85,000	L
2020	Diamond King	5	Kendrick Carmouche	John C. Servis	Cash Is King LLC & LC Racing	1 mi (1.6 km)	1:38.04	$68,750	L
2019	Vino Rosso	3	John R. Velazquez	Todd A. Pletcher	Repole Stable & St. Elias Stable	1 mi (1.6 km)	1:35.27	$86,625	L
2018	Harlan Punch	5	Dylan Davis	David Jacobson	David Jacobson	1 mi (1.6 km)	1:38.03	$90,000	L
2017	Sunny Ridge	4	Manuel Franco	Jason Servis	Dennis A. Drazin	1 1/8 mi (1.8 km)	1:50.19	$75,000	L
2016	Turco Bravo Ŧ	6	Manuel Franco	Gary Contessa	Winning Move Stable (Sigler family)	1 1/8 mi (1.8 km)	1:50.96	$75,000	L
2015	Turco Bravo Ŧ	5	José Ortiz	Gary Contessa	Winning Move Stable (Sigler family)	1 1/8 mi (1.8 km)	1:51.80	$60,000	L
2014	Farhaan	5	Irad Ortiz Jr.	Kiaran McLaughlin	Shadwell Stable	1 1/8 mi (1.8 km)	1:53.52	$60,000	L
2012	– 2013	Race not held							
2011	Goombada Guska	4	Jose Valdivia Jr.	Scott J. Volk	Navesink Breeders	1 1/8 mi (1.8 km)	1:51.53	$39,000	L
2010	Understatement	5	David Cohen	Todd A. Pletcher	Paul P. Pompa Jr.	1 1/8 mi (1.8 km)	1:50.63	$39,000	L
2009	Barrier Reef	4	Ramon A. Dominguez	Thomas Albertrani	Darley Stable	1 1/8 mi (1.8 km)	1:50.57	$42,783	L
2008	Malibu Moonshine	6	Mario Pino	Gary Contessa	Winning Move Stable (Sigler family)	1 1/8 mi (1.8 km)	1:50.19	$41,925	L
2007	Evening Attire	9	Jose Espinoza	Patrick J. Kelly	T. J. Kelly / J. & M. Grant	1 1/8 mi (1.8 km)	1:49.57	$43,563	L
2006	Manchurian	6	Mike Luzzi	Todd A. Pletcher	Allen E. Paulson Living Trust	1 1/8 mi (1.8 km)	1:50.87	$41,925	L
2005	Hydrogen	6	Richard Migliore	Bruce Levine	Earle I. Mack	1 1/8 mi (1.8 km)	1:50.82	$48,570	L
2004	Ground Storm	8	Javier Castellano	William Mott	Centennial Farms	1 1/8 mi (1.8 km)	1:50.92	$48,975	L
2003	Snake Mountain	5	Michael Luzzi	Jimmy Jerkens	Berkshire Stud et al.	1 1/8 mi (1.8 km)	1:49.70	$48,585	L
2002	Ground Storm	6	Javier Castellano	William Mott	Centennial Farms	1 1/8 mi (1.8 km)	1:48.89	$65,520	3
2001	Windrush	4	Joe Bravo	John Kimmel	Gainesway Stable	1 1/8 mi (1.8 km)	1:48.43	$65,880	3
2000	Not So Fast	6	Octavio Vergara	Bruce Levine	Double T Stable	1 1/8 mi (1.8 km)	1:49.00	$49,920	3
1999	Brushing Up	6	Shaun Bridgmohan	Victor Simone	Victor & Phyllis Simone	1 1/8 mi (1.8 km)	1:49.20	$49,005	3
1998	Unreal Turn	6	Chuck C. Lopez	Frank A. Generazio Jr.	Patricia Generazio	1 1/8 mi (1.8 km)	1:48.68	$49,215	3
1997	Iron Gavel	7	Julio Pezua	Gasper S. Moschera	Joques Farm	1 1/8 mi (1.8 km)	1:49.83	$48,180	3
1996	More to Tell	5	Jorge F. Chavez	Gasper S. Moschera	Barbara J. Davis	1 1/8 mi (1.8 km)	1:51.40	$59,490	3
1995	More to Tell	4	Frank Alvarado	Gasper S. Moschera	Barbara J. Davis	1 1/8 mi (1.8 km)	1:51.60	$65,220	3
1994	Koluctoo Jimmy Al	4	Jorge F. Chavez	Bruce Levine	Basil J. Plasteras	1 1/8 mi (1.8 km)	1:50.99	$67,800	3
1993	Two the Twist	6	Richard Migliore	Michael Hushion	Eugene E. Hauman	1 1/8 mi (1.8 km)	1:48.30	$69840	3
1992	Crackedbell	7	Aaron Gryder	Pancho Martin	Viola Sommer	1 1/8 mi (1.8 km)	1:48.80	$67,680	3
1991	I'm Sky High	5	Mike E. Smith	Michael J. Kelly	John R. Murrell	1 1/8 mi (1.8 km)	1:50.47	$68,280	3
1990	It's Academic	6	Jorge Velásquez	Luis Sosa Barrera	Marcus Vogel	1 1/8 mi (1.8 km)	1:50.60	$68040	3
1989	It's Academic	5	Diane Nelson	Luis Sosa Barrera	Marcus Vogel	1 1/8 mi (1.8 km)	1:51.20	$69,000	3
1988	King's Swan	8	Jose Santos	Richard E. Dutrow Sr.	Alvin Akman	1 1/8 mi (1.8 km)	1:51.40	$101,520	3
1987	Lover's Cross	4	Ruben Hernandez	Roger Attfield	Kinghaven Farm	1 1/8 mi (1.8 km)	1:50.00	$65,610	3
1986	Proof	4	Eddie Maple	Robert J. Frankel	Jerome S. Moss	1 1/8 mi (1.8 km)	1:50.00	$66,600	3
1985	Imp Society	4	Jorge Velásquez	D. Wayne Lukas	Heslop Stable	1 1/8 mi (1.8 km)	1:53.00	$64,350	3
1984	Gen'l Practitioner	4	Larry Saumell	John Parisella	Theodore M. Sabarese	1 1/8 mi (1.8 km)	1:48.40	$57,510	3
1983	Sing Sing	5	Rolando Alvarado Jr.	H. Allen Jerkens	Sugartown Stable	1 1/8 mi (1.8 km)	1:51.00	$32,820	3
1982	Castle Knight	4	George Martens	Nick Zito	Andrea Jablow	1 1/8 mi (1.8 km)	1:50.20	$34,380	3
1981	Irish Tower	4	Jeffrey Fell	Stanley Hough	Malcolm H. Winfield	1 1/8 mi (1.8 km)	1:50.40	$33,480	3
1980	Identical	5	Cash Asmussen	Frank "Pancho" Martin	Viola Sommer	1 1/8 mi (1.8 km)	1:52.20	$33,720	3
1979	Pumpkin Moonshine	5	Dave Borden	Howard Tesher	H. Joseph Allen	1 1/8 mi (1.8 km)	1:51.80	$32,550	3
1978	Wise Philip	5	Jacinto Vásquez	William Boland	Domino Stable	1 1/8 mi (1.8 km)	1:50.00	$32,460	3
1977	Patriot's Dream	4	Ron Turcotte	Albert Schwizer	DeCap Stable	1 1/8 mi (1.8 km)	1:51.60	$33,060	3
1976	Right Mind	5	Ron Turcotte	Joseph Kronovich	Deronjo Stable	1 1/8 mi (1.8 km)	1:49.60	$33,960	3
1975	Group Plan	5	Jorge Velásquez	H. Allen Jerkens	Hobeau Farm	1 1/8 mi (1.8 km)	1:47.40	$31,890	3
1974	Key To The Kingdom	4	Daryl Montoya	J. Elliott Burch	Rokeby Stables	1 1/8 mi (1.8 km)	1:46.20	$22,860	3
1973	Forage	4	Laffit Pincay Jr.	James W. Maloney	William Haggin Perry	1 1/8 mi (1.8 km)	1:46.40	$16,875	3
1972	Canonero II	4	Gustavo Ávila	Buddy Hirsch	King Ranch	1 1/8 mi (1.8 km)	1:46.20	$16,830	
1971	Protanto	4	Jorge Velásquez	MacKenzie Miller	Cragwood Stables	1 1/4 mi (2.0 km)	2:02.40	$20,370	
1970	Hydrologist	4	Jacinto Vásquez	Roger Laurin	Meadow Stable	1 1/4 mi (2.0 km)	2:00.80	$17,777	
1969	Chompion	4	Heliodoro Gustines	Ivor G. Balding	C. V. Whitney	1 1/4 mi (2.0 km)	2:02.40	$18,427	
1968	Grace Born	4	Eddie Belmonte	Angel Penna Sr.	Gustave Ring	1 1/4 mi (2.0 km)	2:00.40	$19,012	
1967	Ring Twice	4	William Boland	Bert Mulholland	George D. Widener Jr.	1 1/4 mi (2.0 km)	2:02.00	$18,817	
1966	Malicious	5	Robert Ussery	John Gaver Sr.	Greentree Stable	1 1/4 mi (2.0 km)	2:03.40	$18,395	
1965	Kelso	8	Milo Valenzuela	Carl Hanford	Bohemia Stable	1 1/4 mi (2.0 km)	2:02.80	$17,842	
1964	The Ibex	4	Bill Shoemaker	James E. Fitzsimmons	Ogden Phipps	1 1/4 mi (2.0 km)	2:01.00	$18,753	
1963	Endymion	4	Braulio Baeza	Bert Mulholland	George D. Widener Jr.	1 1/4 mi (2.0 km)	2:05.20	$17,582	
1962	Kelso	5	Ismael Valenzuela	Carl Hanford	Bohemia Stable	1 1/4 mi (2.0 km)	2:00.80	$19,045	
1961	Black Thumper	4	John Ruane	Herb Fisher	Ledgemont Stable	1 1/4 mi (2.0 km)	2:01.60	$18,557	
1960	Manassa Mauler	4	William Boland	Frank "Pancho" Martin	Emil Dolce	1 1/8 mi (1.8 km)	1:48.60	$18,258	
1959	Village Idiot	4	Eric Guerin	Bill Winfrey	Alfred G. Vanderbilt II	1 1/8 mi (1.8 km)	1:49.60	$17,575	
1958	Bold Ruler	4	Eddie Arcaro	James E. Fitzsimmons	Wheatley Stable	1 1/8 mi (1.8 km)	1:48.40	$17,900	
1957	Argent	4	John Choquette	James C. Bentley	Benjamin R. Steen	1 1/2 mi (2.4 km)	2:30.40	$18,750	
1956	Thinking Cap	4	Paul J. Bailey	Henry Clark	Christiana Stables	1 1/2 mi (2.4 km)	2:29.60	$19,100	

- Ŧ – Turco Bravo, Southern Hemisphere foal of October 13, 2009.
