= 1971 Kentucky Derby =

Horse race

97th Kentucky Derby
- Kentucky Derby
- Grade I stakes race
- Location: Churchill Downs
- Date: May 1, 1971
- Winning horse: Canonero II
- Jockey: Gustavo Ávila
- Trainer: Juan D. Arias
- Owner: Edgar Caibett
- Conditions: Fast
- Surface: Dirt
- Attendance: 123,284

The 1971 Kentucky Derby was the 97th running of the Kentucky Derby. The race took place on May 1, 1971, with 123,284 people in attendance.

== Full results ==
Finished	Post	Horse	Jockey	Trainer	Owner	Time / behind
1st	15	Canonero II	Gustavo Ávila	Juan Arias	Edgar Caibett	2:03 1/5
2nd	7	Jim French	Angel Cordero Jr.	John P. Campo	Frank Caldwell	
3rd	8	Bold Reason	Jean Cruguet	Angel Penna Sr.	William A. Levin	
4th	1A	Eastern Fleet	Eddie Maple	Reggie Cornell	Calumet Farm	
5th	6	Unconscious	Laffit Pincay Jr.	John G. Canty	Arthur A. Seeligson Jr.	
6th	5	Vegas Vic	Howard Grant	Randy Sechrest	Betty Sechrest & Charles Fritz	
7th	9	Tribal Line	David E. Whited	Dewey P. Smith	J. E. & T. Alie Grissom	
8th	1	Bold and Able	Jorge Velásquez	Reggie Cornell	Calumet Farm	
9th	11	List	Jim Nichols	Alcee Richard	Dorothy D. Brown	
10th	3	Twist the Axe	Garth Patterson	George Timothy Poole III	Pastorale Stable (Barbara Vanderbilt Whitney Headley)	
11th	4	Going Straight	Oswaldo Torres	Elwood McCann Sr.	Donamire Farm (Don & Mira Ball)	
12th	2	Royal Leverage	Martin Formin	George J. Getz	Philip Teinowitz	
13th	3X	Impetuosity	Eric Guerin	George Timothy Poole III	Wendell P. Rosso	
14th	10	Helio Rise	Kenny Knapp	David Erb	Roger W. & R. T. Wilson Jr.	
15th	2C	On the Money	Mickey Solomone	George J. Getz	Philip Teinowitz & Chuck Schmidt	
16th	14	Barbizon Streak	Donald Brumfield	Oran Battles	Irene C. Udouj	
17th	16	Knight Counter	Mike Manganello	Victor A. Doleski	Robert Huffman	
18th	13	Jr.'s Arrowhead	Anthony Rini	Julian J. Serna Jr.	Walnut Hill Farm	
19th	17	Fourulla	Don MacBeth	Arthur H. Sullivan	Arthur H. Sullivan	
20th	12	Saigon Warrior	Robert Parrott	Charles M. Day	Charles M. Day	

- Winning Breeder: Edward B. Benjamin; (KY)
