= Sicótico =

Racehorse

- Sire: Blueformer
- Grandsire: Dynaformer
- Dam: Lump of Joy
- Damsire: Lombardi
- Sex: Stallion
- Foaled: 2005
- Country: Dominican Republic
- Color: Bay
- Breeder: Rancho San Antonio
- Owner: Angel Contreras, Angelito Contreras
- Record: 26:24-0-0
- Earnings: $223,825

Major wins
- Clásico Matías Ramón Mella (2008); Clásico Francisco del Rosario Sanchez (2008); Clásico Juan Pablo Duarte (2008); Clásico del Caribe (2008)

Sicótico (2005-2024) is a racehorse from the Dominican Republic known for achieving 24 consecutive victories throughout his career. He is also widely regarded as the best horse to be bred in the country having won the Triple Crown and became the only Dominican horse to win the Clásico del Caribe.

== Background ==
Sicótico's name in Spanish means psychotic. He is bay in color with no markings on his legs or face. He is a son of Blueformer (USA) who was by Dynaformer (USA), a sire of multiple classic winners including 2006 Kentucky Derby Barbaro as well as Manhattan Handicap winner Point of Entry, and North American champion steeplechaser McDynomo. Her mother Lump of Joy (USA) comes from Lombardi (USA), which was exported to England for competition. She also produced Dominican champion sprinter Compulsivo

== Racing career ==
=== 2-year-old season ===
Sicótico made its debut on April 24, 2007, in the third race at a distance of 1,000 meters. Sicótico, was a super-heavy favorite at odds of 1/9, however, Sicótico failed to even complete the race as he stumbled out of the gate and unseated his rider. His first career victory would happen on July 21, 2007, in a maiden race at a distance of 1,000 meters setting a time of 1:00 2/5. Quickly after this victory, Sicótico would begin to show off his dominance at stakes level taking the Copa Simon A. Pemberton and then the La Copa El Incorruptible at 1,400 meters. This showed that Sicótico was going to be a colt that the more distance they gave him, the more he ran. He would continue racking up wins at the age of 2 managing 7 by the end of the year from distances of 1,000–1,700 meters. His seventh and final win of the year was by far one of the most visually impressive despite there being 4 other challengers 3 of them barely made it to the final turn by the time he hit the finish line shattering the track record with a time of 1:22 1/5.

=== 3-year-old season ===
If his performances at the age of 2 were anything to go on, Sicótico was going to be a monster. He made his seasonal debut La Copa Día de Duarte where he set another track record running the race in 1:44 3/5. He would go on to win 2 more races to extend his winning streak to 10 straight races in preparation for the first jewel of the Dominican Republican Triple Crown the Clásico Matías Ramón Mella. It was no challenge at all as the triple crown turned out to be nothing but a cakewalk winning the races by huge margins and not letting anyone get near him. Following his win in the triple crown, he would manage 2 more wins increasing his win streak to 16 straight before going to the biggest test of his career the Clásico del Caribe. In over 42 runnings of the race and even hosting the race in 1995 the Dominican Republic had never won it. But now was the best shot they had ever had. Sicótico did not take the lead, as jockey Joel Rosario positioned him fifth passing the post of the final 900 meters and wasn't fazed when Defensora and Venezuelan Rey Angelo passed inside. Sicótico entered third behind Defensora and the Mexican Antares. Defensora began to fade in the final meters and Sicótico took advantage of this and zoomed on by winning the race by 1 length. He had completed the course in 1:52.54 for the 1,800 meters. The Dominican Republic had gotten there first ever Clásico del Caribe there was no doubt about it now Sicótico was the best 3-year-old in the Caribbean.

=== 4-year-old season ===
He would return to the Dominican Republic where he would continue to show off his near invincibility by setting a track record for 6 furlongs with a 1:09 1/5. He then went on to get repeat wins in the Clásico Restauración and the Clásico Presidente Constitucional. He then set a second track record that year at 1 3/16 miles with a 1:56 1/5. By the end of his campaign in the Dominican Republic, he had stretched his winning streak to 24 straight victories. Which to this day is the 11th greatest winning streak in the history of horse racing and is tied for the third greatest winning streak of the 21st century with New Caledonia's Ivor Hill only beaten by Winx and Black Cavier. He would make his final career start in the Copa Confraternidad del Caribe a race the Dominican Republic had only won once in 1995. Arrangements were made for Joel Rosario to ride Sicótico again but commitments that were presented to him could not be specified. The decision was made for the Puerto Rican rider Jesús Manuel Ríos to be his rider in the 10 furlong race. Sicótico would play the role of stalker staying in third turning for the home stretch he could only get a slim lead as Soy Conquistador outfought him in the stretch and opened up a lead while Sicótico simply didn't have anything left fading to fifth for what would be his final start.

== Retirement ==
After the Copa Confraternidad del Caribe Sicótico would be retired with 26 starts, 24 of them were victories, all of them consecutively, only ever losing his first and final races. He set multiple track records ranging from 6 furlongs all the way to 1 3/16 miles. He became the richest horse to ever race in the Dominican Republic earning $223,825. As well as the only horse from the Dominican Republic to win the Clásico del Caribe and is considered by many to be the greatest horse to ever race in the Dominican Republic. In retirement, he has managed to sire many classic winners including San Elias, Panelista, and Amoroso.
