= Diamante Negro =

Mexican Thoroughbred racehorse

- Sire: Election Day
- Grandsire: Sadler's Wells
- Dam: Marthas Gift
- Damsire: Discover
- Sex: Stallion
- Country: Mexico
- Color: Dark Bay
- Breeder: José Cerrillo
- Owner: Paula Martínez
- Jockey: Moisés González
- Record: 34:14-7-4
- Earnings: Mex$6,615,063

Major wins
- Stakes Jockey Club Mexicano (2013); Clásico del Caribe (2013); Handicap Presidencial (2015); Handicap de Las Américas (2014, 2015, 2016)

Diamante Negro (foaled February 25, 2010) is a Mexican-bred racehorse most famous for winning the Handicap de las Américas in three consecutive years.

== Background ==
Diamante Negro, whose name means "black diamond" in Spanish, was bred and born in Mexico. His sire side was very European with his father Election Day being born in Ireland. Election Day was by the legendary sire and broodmare sire Sadler's Wells who sired champions such as Galileo, High Chaparral, Montjeu, and El Prado. His dam Marthas Gift was a Mexican bred. He was bred at Rancho Pozo de Luna by José Cerrillo. As a foal, he proved to be a unique horse with lots of personality and restless energy. During this time he would even have companion animals at first he had a sheep but eventually he got a goat that Diamante Negro become inseparable from.

== History ==
Diamante Negro would manage to be undefeated in his first 2 starts at the age of 2 winning his first race on July 21, 2012. The race was as a cruise as he was easily able to win by 10 lengths and then racks up a second victory at 6 furlongs by 10 1/2 lengths. However, his attempts in stakes company were not nearly as easy for him. He would only get 1 victory in his next 4 starts at the age of 2. Rounding out his 2-year-old season with 6 starts 3 wins 1 second and 1 third.

=== Mexican Triple Crown ===
Things would improve for him at the age of 3 as despite a 4th in his seasonal debut race he would run in the first jewel of the Mexican triple crown the Stakes Jockey Club Mexicano. The race was off with Extrusora and Cráter set the pace with a clear margin in front of the field. However, such a pace and margin cannot last forever and the two tire out by the time they reach the home stretch giving Diamante Rubio the chance to take the lead on the rail. Into the far turn, Diamante Rubio has a clear lead with Diamante Negro on the far outside swooping into second place. The stablemates would soon go head and head. The two horses battled it out until on the far outside Diamante Negro took over the lead in the final strides and just got up to win. However, in the second jewel, he was not so lucky as El Indu Tlatelolco turned the race into a match race while Diamante Negro was a very distant 4th. He would repeat this performance in the final jewel the Derby Mexicano.

=== 2013 Clásico del Caribe ===
After the triple crown, he managed two very solid returning first a run in the Clásico Kremlin where after a fast early pace he easily zoomed from the far outside to win by over 4 lengths. After that, his next start was the Criadores Mexicanos. Leading up to the race the entire racetrack had been flooded with heavy rains making the track incredibly sloppy. Compared to his other races the pace was not nearly as fast and there wasn't as much of a pace meltdown most of the horses were clumped together in a group barely separated by less than 5 lengths. Except for Diamante Negro and one other horse. By the time the far turn went around the far turn, Diamante Negro made a huge move getting sent 7 wide around the turn and then opening up over 5 lengths by the finish line. After that, he would take a qualifying race for the final race of his 3-year-old year the Clásico del Caribe.

At the time it had been 18 years since Mexico had won the Clásico del Caribe with Locochón. The race started all broke off well the leaders we Diamante Negro dropped to the back. For most of the race, he seemed out of contention staying far back even when they went into the final turn. In the stretch, the favorite Jubilee Queen made her move and took the lead. Meanwhile, Diamante Negro went around the home turn wide, and made a move late game. With all other opponents unable to catch her Jubillee Queen seemed home free with no horse on camera making a move on her late stretch. Until Diamante Negro came into the frame with a late surge. Both Jubilee Queen and Diamante Negro opened up multiple lengths on the rest of there rivals. Jubilee Queen desperately tried to hold him off but Diamante Negro's late burst of speed was too much as he managed to win by half a length.

=== 2014 season ===
At the age of 4, his new priority was to go back to Mexico and prep up for one of the biggest races in Mexico the Handicap de las Américas. However, travailing back from The Dominican Republic took some time to get used to as his returning race in the Handicap Gay Dalton finishing an underwhelming 5th. Things got worse with his next performance Handicap Loma de Sotelo with an 8th place finish. The worst placing he would even have in his career. Despite this, he was still favored for the Handicap de las Américas. The race was playing out as normal with front runners fading and other horses moving up to take the lead. In the home stretch, El Indu took the lead and began to open up with Diamante Negro a distant 4th by nearly 10 lengths. But despite such a huge margin El Indu blew all his energy just trying to take the lead in the stretch and was beginning to stagger Diamante Negro took the moment of weakness as his shot as he flew across the track and got up in the final strides to win by three-quarters of a length. He would run another 4 times after that however he would not get any wins. He managed 1 second-place finish in the Gran Premio Longines and 3 third-place finishes to round out the year. He did not make a return to run in the Copa Confraternidad del Caribe.

=== 2015 season ===
Going into his second bid for the Handicap de las Américas he would run twice again. He would start slow managing only 4th place. But in his second time out he was able to get a victory taking the Handicap Presidencial. Next up was his second run in the Handicap de las Américas. The race started with a handful of frontrunners setting a fast pace with a huge gap to the rest of the pack. By the far turn though the pace began to melt as the leaders were exhausted In the far turn Diamante Negro swung by to take the lead after that he with minimal asking he was able to hold off all challengers to keep the lead throughout the stretch winning the race for the second time. Joining the likes of Gay Dalton, Gran Zar, and Dilic.

This time around he would make a bid for the Copa Confraternidad del Caribe following this win. He would rack up another victory to help qualify but he would lose the Autumn Classic to Eclair a fellow runner in the race and a fellow Mexican bred. This would be recreated during the Copa Confraternidad as Eclaire would set the pace and demolish Diamante Negro. Diamante Negro was simply unable to catch Eclaire as he would go gate to wire never tiring and making sure Diamante Negro was nowhere to be found. Diamante Negro would cross the line a very distant 5th place.

=== 2016 season ===
Diamante Negro won the Handicap de las Américas for the third time in a row. This would be his final race as after this he would be retired to stud.
