= Eastern Fleet (horse) =

American-bred Thoroughbred racehorse

- Sire: Fleet Nasrullah
- Grandsire: Nasrullah
- Dam: Amoret
- Damsire: Bull Lea
- Sex: Stallion
- Foaled: 1968
- Country: United States
- Colour: Bay
- Breeder: Calumet Farm
- Owner: Calumet Farm
- Trainer: Reggie Cornell
- Record: 48: 11-7-9
- Earnings: $283,594

Major wins
- Florida Derby (1971); Firecracker Handicap (1971) American Classic Race placing: Preakness Stakes 2nd (1971)
- Last updated on July 12, 2013

Eastern Fleet was an American Thoroughbred racehorse foaled on May 14, 1968. Bred by Calumet Farm and E. B. Benjamin, he was sired by Fleet Nasrullah and was a grandson of Nasrullah. He was out of a Bull Lea mare, Amoret. Eastern Fleet is best remembered for winning the grade 1 Florida Derby and finishing second in the $200,000 grade 1 Preakness Stakes to Canonero II.

== Background ==
Trained by Reggie Cornell, at age two Eastern Fleet won three of his first five races, including his maiden and two allowance races. In December 1972, his connections ran him in his first stakes race at six furlongs on the dirt in the Sugar Bowl Handicap at Fair Grounds Race Course. He won that race going away by four lengths.

== Three-year-old season ==
In the lead-up to the 1971 U.S. Triple Crown series, Eastern Fleet won the grade 1 Florida Derby at a mile and one eighth at Gulfstream Park in Hallandale Beach, Florida, in mid-March. He then placed second in the mile and one eighth Wood Memorial Stakes at Aqueduct Racetrack in early April.

In early June, Eastern Fleet finished third to Twist The Axe in the mile and one sixteenth Ohio Derby at Thistledown Racecourse in North Randall, Ohio, just outside Cleveland. In late July, he showed again to West Coast Scout in the Haskell Invitational Stakes at a mile and one sixteenth at Monmouth Park Racetrack in Long Branch, New Jersey.

== 1971 Preakness Stakes ==
In May 1971, Eastern Fleet's connections, trainer Reggie Cornell and owner Calumet Farm, entered him in the second jewel of the Triple Crown, the $200,000 Preakness Stakes, run at a mile and three sixteenths on dirt at Pimlico Race Course in Baltimore, Maryland. Eastern Fleet was listed on the morning line as the fourth choice at almost 7–1 in a field of eleven colts. The Derby winner and Derby runner-up, Canonero II and Jim French, were co-favorites with the public at 7–2. Eastern Fleet broke poorly, bearing to the outside badly bumping Executioner. He recovered quickly and settled in fifth place under jockey Eddie Maple. He was ridden aggressively from the start by Maple going into Pimlico's famous "Clubhouse Turn" and made the lead rounding the turn by a head. Eastern Fleet maintained his narrow lead down the backstretch, setting fast fractions on the front end completing the first quarter in :232/5 and the half in :47 seconds flat. Derby winner Canonero II was a head back with Sound Off and 81-1 longshot Spouting Horn five lengths back.

Around the final turn, Canonero circled Eastern Fleet as both colts hit the top of the stretch together. Eastern Fleet was on the inside and Canonero II was on the outside, hemming him in. The two leaders pulled away from the rest of the field, and Canonero won by one and one quarter lengths over Eastern Fleet. Eastern Fleet finished over four and a half lengths in front of the other co-favorite, Jim French, with Sound Off finishing fourth. Eastern Fleet took home 20% of the purse, which equaled $30,000.

== Four-year-old season ==
Eastern Fleet had modest success in the later part of his racing career. He finished third to Silver Mallet in the six-furlong Gravesend Handicap at Aqueduct Racetrack in Queens, New York, and third in the Roamer Handicapm also at Aqueduct.
