= Juan Arias (horse trainer) =

Venezuelan horse trainer (1938–2021)

Personal information
- Born: May 6, 1938 Marin, Yaracuy, Venezuela
- Died: August 21, 2021 (aged 83) Caracas, Venezuela

Horse racing career
- Sport: Horse racing

Major racing wins
- U.S. Triple Crown wins: Kentucky Derby (1971); Preakness Stakes (1971)

Significant horses
- Canonero II, Discomo, Hassi's Image

Juan D. Arias (May 6, 1938 – August 20, 2021) was a Venezuelan Thoroughbred horse trainer best known for race conditioning Canonero II to win the 1971 Kentucky Derby and Preakness Stakes in the United States. Canonero II would be voted the Eclipse Award as the 1971 American Champion Three-Year-Old Male Horse.

Arias grew up in poverty on a farm in central Venezuela. As a child, he had hoped to become a pilot in the Venezuelan air force but suffered a hernia which prevented him from going into the training program. Instead, aged fifteen, he became an apprentice to a local horse trainer, and two years later was accepted into the trainers school at La Rinconada, a race track in Caracas, and received his training licence on 4 July 1959.

Arias died on 20 August 2021, at the age of 83.
