= 1971 Preakness Stakes =

96th running of the Preakness Stakes

96th Preakness Stakes
- The Preakness Stakes
- Location: Pimlico Race Course, Baltimore, Maryland, United States
- Date: May 15, 1971
- Winning horse: Canonero II
- Jockey: Gustavo Ávila
- Conditions: Fast
- Surface: Dirt

The 1971 Preakness Stakes was the 96th running of the $200,000 Preakness Stakes thoroughbred horse race. The race took place on May 15, 1971, and was televised in the United States on the CBS television network. Canonero II, who was jockeyed by Gustavo Ávila, won the race by one and one half lengths over runner-up Eastern Fleet. Approximate post time was 5:40 p.m. Eastern Time. The race was run on a fast track in a final time of 1:54 flat. The Maryland Jockey Club reported total attendance of 47,221, this is recorded as third highest on the list of American thoroughbred racing top attended events for North America in 1971.

== Payout ==
The 96th Preakness Stakes Payout Schedule

Program Number	Horse Name	Win	Place	Show
9	Canonero II	US$8.80	$6.20	$4.00
5	Eastern Fleet	-	$8.20	$5.20
11	Jim French	–	–	$3.20

== The full chart ==
Finish Position	Margin (lengths)	Post Position	Horse name	Jockey	Trainer	Owner	Post Time Odds	Purse Earnings
1st	0	9	Canonero II	Gustavo Ávila	Juan Arias	Edgar Caibett	3.40-1 co-favorite	$137,400
2nd	11/2	5	Eastern Fleet	Eddie Maple	Reggie Cornell	Calumet Farm	6.40-1	$30,000
3rd	6	11	Jim French	Ángel Cordero Jr.	John P. Campo	Frank J. Caldwell	3.40-1 co-favorite	$15,000
4th	61/4	1	Sound Off	Chuck Baltazar	Gerald Lord	Gustave Ring	10.90-1	$7,500
5th	63/4	6	Bold Reason	Jean Cruguet	Angel Penna Sr.	William A. Levin	12.40-1	
6th	123/4	7	Executioner	Jacinto Vásquez	Edward J. Yowell	October House Farm	3.90-1	
7th	131/4	8	Royal J. D.	Eddie Belmonte	Angelo Bertrando	John McCloy Davis	54.80-1	
8th	131/2	4	Vegas Vic	Bill Hartack	Randy Sechrest	Betty Sechrest & Charles Fritz	10.10-1	
9th	133/4	3	Impetuosity	Eric Guerin	George Pool	Wendell P. Rosso	17.20-1	
10th	143/4	10	Spouting Horn	Jack Kurtz	William "Herbie" Edwards Jr.	Walter D. Fletcher	81.40-1	
11th	15	2	Limit to Reason	Jorge Velásquez	Thomas Joseph Kelly	Brookmeade Stable	15.80-1	

- Winning Breeder: E. B. Benjamin; (KY)
- Winning Time: 1:54 3/5
- Track Condition: Fast
- Total Attendance: 47,221
