= Arthur Froehlich =

American architect

- Froehlich, circa 1959
- Born: May 17, 1909; Los Angeles, California
- Died: October 3, 1985 (aged 76); Malibu, California
- Occupation: Architect
- Spouse: Dorothy Froehlich
- Children: Two
- Buildings: Hollywood Park Racetrack; Keeneland; Aqueduct Racetrack

Arthur Froehlich (May 17, 1909 – October 3, 1985), was an American architect in Beverly Hills, California. His firm, Arthur Froehlich & Associates, is known for their mid-century commercial building designs, and thoroughbred horse racetracks.

== Biography ==
Froehlich was born in Los Angeles to a cattle and dairy farmer. He attended Polytechnic High School in Los Angeles and studied at UCLA. One of his first jobs was drafting plans for Santa Anita racetrack, which opened in 1934. He began his own firm in 1938, and became well known for his design of Hollywood Park Racetrack in Inglewood, California. he died in Malibu California in 1985 of a heart attack.

== Buildings credited to Arthur Froehlich & Associates ==
Froehlich's firm designed Hollywood Park Racetrack in Inglewood, California; Keeneland in Lexington, Kentucky; and Aqueduct Racetrack and Belmont Park, both in New York. He also designed tracks in Canada, New Zealand, South Africa, Panama, France and Trinidad. His firm also designed Roosevelt Raceway in Roosevelt Field, New York, Garden State Park in Cherry Hill, New Jersey, the Jack Rose Building in Ventura, California, the Center 3 Theater in San Diego, California, and the Wagon Wheel Bowling Alley in Wagon Wheel Junction, Oxnard, California.

One of his most lavish designs was for Hipódromo Nacional at Caracas, Venezuela (A.K.A. La Rinconada Hippodrome) in 1959. Sports Illustrated wrote that year that his creations were as "bright and gay as a state fair." The magazine described them as colorful, spacious, and glamorous. The tracks were filled with art and lush landscaping and provided a comfortable and relaxing environment in which to gamble. Froehlich noted that a good racetrack design has to be "as efficient as a bank, as careful in its community relations as a department store and as comfortable as a public park."

The output of Froehlich's firm ranged from the mundane (a parking structure at UCLA), to the fantastic: the animation studio for Hanna-Barbera in Hollywood. In between, the firm designed White Memorial Medical Center, the headquarters building for Merle Norman Cosmetics, in Westchester, The Screen Directors Guild in Hollywood, Francisco Sepulveda Middle School in North Hills. Froehlich renamed his firm Froehlich & Kow in 1978, after appointing architect Morio Kow as a partner and Gordon Gong as associate in charge of special projects.

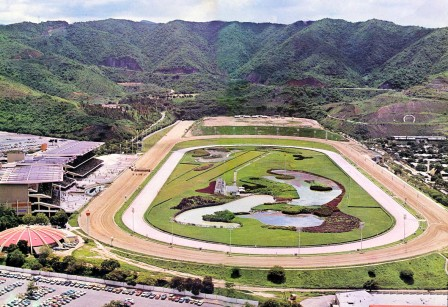
La Rinconada Racetrack, Caracas, Venezuela

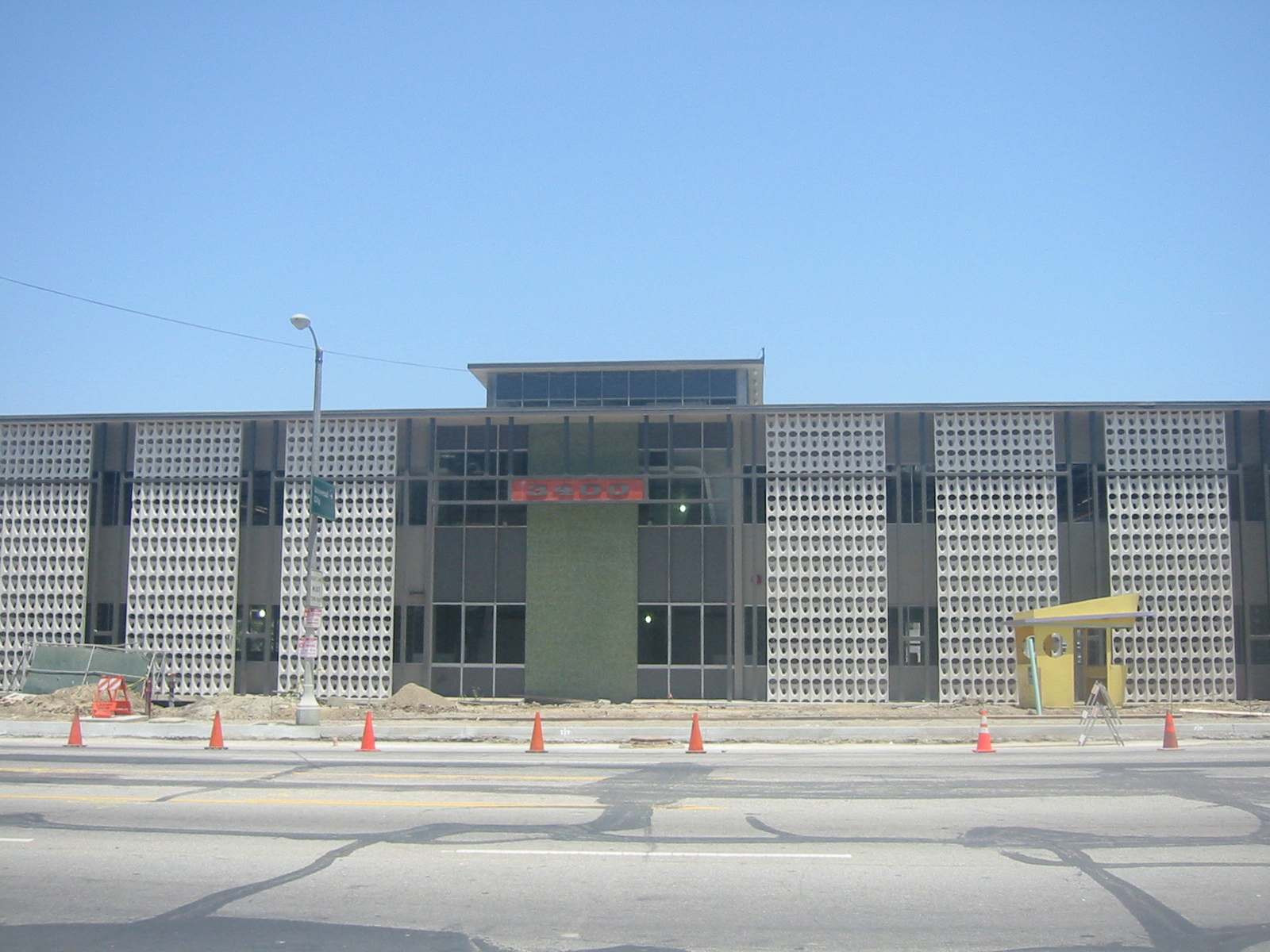
The Hanna Barbera Studio, Los Angeles, California

== See also ==
- List of horse racing venues

== Sources ==
- "New Westside Center Started". Los Angeles Times. May 1, 1960. p. M13.
- George S. Koyl, ed. (1956). "American Architects Directory". R.R.Bowker.
- Richard Stone Reeves (1997). Crown Jewels of Thoroughbred Racing: Original Paintings. Eclipse Press. p. 28. ISBN 0-939049-90-2.
