= Pretendre =

British-bred Thoroughbred racehorse

- Sire: Doutelle
- Grandsire: Prince Chevalier
- Dam: Limicola
- Damsire: Verso II
- Sex: Stallion
- Foaled: 1963
- Country: Great Britain
- Colour: Chestnut
- Breeder: H. R. H. The Princess Royal
- Owner: J. A. Claude Lilley
- Trainer: Jack Jarvis
- Record: 12: 6-2-1
- Earnings: £44,414

Major wins
- Observer Gold Cup (1965); Dewhurst Stakes (1965); Blue Riband Trial Stakes (1966); King Edward VII Stakes (1966)

Pretendre (1963–1972) was a British Thoroughbred racehorse who came within a neck of winning the 1966 Epsom Derby. Bred by Mary, Princess Royal, Pretendre's damsire was Verso II, winner of the 1943 Prix de l'Arc de Triomphe. He was sired by Doutelle, a multiple stakes winning son of Prince Chevalier. Racing in France in 1945/46, Prince Chevalier's wins included what are now Group One races, the Prix du Jockey Club and Prix Lupin. Prince Chevalier was the sire of the 1951 Epsom Derby winner, Artic Prince. In 1960, Prince Chevalier was the Leading sire in France and Leading broodmare sire in Great Britain & Ireland in 1972.

Pretendre was purchased by J. A. Claude Lilley, a textile manufacturer and the proprietor of Quarry Stud on Duffield Bank in Makeney, Derbyshire. Conditioned for racing by Jack Jarvis, the colt was one of the top two-year-olds racing in 1965. After winning the Blue Riband Trial Stakes as a three-year-old he went into the 1966 Epsom Derby as the betting favourite. In a fierce stretch run, Pretendre finished second by a neck to Charlottown. That year Pretendre won the King Edward VII Stakes at Ascot Racecourse and was third in the Eclipse Stakes at Sandown Park Racecourse.

== Sire of a Kentucky Derby/Preakness Stakes winner ==
Retired after the 1966 racing season, Pretendre was sent to the United States to stand at stud in Kentucky. Part of his first crop foaled in 1968 was a bay colt born with a noticeably crooked foreleg. Considered to have no future in racing, he was sold as a yearling for a mere $1,200 at the Keeneland Sales. Acquired by Venezuelan interests, the horse was named Canonero and raced at age two in Venezuela where it earned an undistinguished record. At age three, because of his American birth, the colt was sent to run in the 1971 U.S. Triple Crown series. Canonero stunned the racing world when he won both Kentucky Derby and the Preakness Stakes, the latter in race record time.

Pretendre was returned to stud duty in England. In 1970 he became one of the first stallions to be shuttled across the world when he was sent to stand at Waikato Stud, near Matamata in New Zealand. Of his offspring there, he was the damsire of Leica Pretender, the dam of the Australian horse Nothin' Leica Dane who won the Group One Victoria Derby and Group One Spring Champion Stakes.

Pretendre unexpectedly died in 1972 at the age of nine.
