= Frank E. Childs =

American racehorse trainer

Personal information
- Born: December 27, 1887 Cove, Oregon
- Died: January 10, 1973 (aged 85) California
- Occupation: Trainer

Horse racing career
- Sport: Horse racing

Major racing wins
- Wolverine Handicap (1941); Kentucky Oaks (1944); Del Mar Derby (1949); San Antonio Handicap (1949); San Carlos Handicap (1951); Del Mar Futurity (1958, 1961); Santa Catalina Stakes (1965); California Oaks (1968); Honeymoon Handicap (1968); La Centinela Stakes (1968); Princess Stakes (1968); Beverly Hills Handicap (1969); Santa Ana Stakes (1969); Los Angeles Handicap (1971) U.S. Triple Crown wins: Kentucky Derby (1959)

Honors
- U.S. Racing Hall of Fame (1968)

Significant horses
- Bolero, Berseem, Canina, Black Badge, Dinner Gong, Flying Rhythm, Miss Ribot, Occupy, Tomy Lee

Frank E. Childs (December 27, 1887 – January 10, 1973) was an American Thoroughbred racehorse trainer. He was the trainer of Tomy Lee who won the 1959 Kentucky Derby. He was inducted into the National Museum of Racing and Hall of Fame in 1968.

Frank Childs served with the United States Army during World War I.
