= Tomy Lee =

British-bred Thoroughbred racehorse

- Sire: Tudor Minstrel
- Grandsire: Owen Tudor
- Dam: Auld Alliance
- Damsire: Brantome
- Sex: Stallion
- Foaled: 1956
- Country: United Kingdom
- Color: Bay
- Breeder: Captain David H. Wills
- Owner: Fred W. & Juliette M. Turner Jr. Colors: White, Yellow "T", White Band on Yellow Sleeves, Yellow and White Cap.
- Trainer: Frank E. Childs
- Record: 31: 14-4-3
- Earnings: $405,014

Major wins
- Haggin Stakes (1958); Hollywood Juvenile Championship Stakes (1958); Del Mar Futurity (1958); Forerunner Stakes (1959); Blue Grass Stakes (1959) Triple Crown race wins: Kentucky Derby (1959)
- Last updated on August 25, 2021

Tomy Lee (May 7, 1956 – October 29, 1971) was a British-bred Thoroughbred racehorse who won the 1959 Kentucky Derby defeating Sword Dancer, First Landing, Royal Orbit and the filly Silver Spoon. Tomy Lee became only the second non-American bred horse to ever win the Kentucky Derby and Bertie Kerr became the first non-American agent to buy a winner.

== Background ==
Tomy Lee was a bay horse bred in England by Captain David H. Wills. As a weanling he was purchased by the millionaire oilman and rancher from Texas, Fred Turner Jr. and his wife Juliette. In 1956, bloodstock agent Bertie Kerr attended the Newmarket sales, acting on behalf of Turner. Kerr was instructed to buy two horses that Turner had picked out of the catalogue. The Turner's were chiefly interested in a son of Tulyar that came to be named Tuleg. Since they believed that horses needed company, they also wanted to buy a second horse in order to provide Tuleg with a travelling companion. That second horse was Tomy Lee. Shortly after Tomy Lee won the 1959 Kentucky Derby, Kerr relayed to Michael O'Hehir the story behind the purchase. O'Hehir then retold the story in the Daily Racing Form. After viewing Turner's first choice for Tuleg's travelling companion, Kerr was less than impressed and cabled him, advising him not to buy this particular foal. Instead Kerr recommended another colt he had seen at the sale. Turner gave Kerr the go ahead "to bid up to $15,000," and Kerr got Tomy Lee for $6,762. Tuleg was purchased for $25,000 but could not race at two because of an injury and at three bowed a tendon.

Tomy Lee's dam Auld Alliance was a daughter of Iona, a half-sister of Epsom Derby winner Ocean Swell.

== Racing career ==
Kerr's recommendation turned out to be a bargain. At two, Tomy Lee stood 16 hands, weighed a bit over a thousand pounds, and was sound. The press called the bay with four white stockings a greyhound, slim and perfectly proportioned. Sent to California for his first year on the track, he won his first six races. Then he was sent East to run in two more, both jousts with First Landing, his only losses that year, and in each case he was closing fast. At age three, he won four of seven races including the 7 furlong Forerunner Stakes at Keeneland Race Course in which Bill Shoemaker rode him to victory in track record time. Still at Keeneland sand ridden by Shoemaker, Tomy Lee then won the important mile and one-eighth Blue Grass Stakes. At ages two and three, Tomy Lee was runner-up in the voting for U.S. Champion male.

Bill Shoemaker, who had ridden Sword Dancer to a win in the Stepping Stone Purse a week before the Kentucky Derby, had already agreed to ride Tomy Lee in the Derby. Early on, Tomy Lee was involved in a speed duel with Troilus, and won it, so when Sword Dancer made his move under Bill Boland, Shoemaker thought Tomy Lee was spent and Sword Dancer might take the Derby. Seeing Boland come up, he called, "Good luck, I hope you win it." Sword Dancer took over the lead by half a length, but Tomy Lee came on again in mid stretch, behind by only a head. The horses bumped several times. At the wire, Tomy Lee won by a nose. Boland claimed a foul, but the judges disallowed it after deliberating for 17 minutes. First Landing came in third, three and a half lengths behind these two, and Royal Orbit, who went on to win the Preakness Stakes that year, came from last to fourth. Fifth was Silver Spoon, the first filly to enter the Derby since 1945 and the last until 1980.

After his win in the Kentucky Derby, Tomy Lee did not run in the remaining two U.S. Triple Crown races. His trainer, Frank Childs, said he didn't like races too close together, so Tomy Lee returned to California to rest. Later that year, he finished sixth in the Cinema Handicap at Hollywood Park Racetrack, a race won by Silver Spoon. Shoemaker could not ride Tomy Lee in this race since he was committed to Sword Dancer in the Belmont Stakes (which they won), so Don Pierce got the mount. Turner felt that Pierce mishandled his colt, who needed "special care" and understanding, something only Shoemaker could give him. In anger, he took his horse out of training for six months. At the end of the year, Johnny Longden rode Tomy Lee to a win in a 6-furlong race.

Tomy Lee ran twice at four and was unplaced both times. Between 1960 and 1963, he earned just $27,697. He was retired to stud at L.P. Doherty's Stallion Station in Kentucky but proved to have an odd condition as a stallion. His sperm did not live long enough to impregnate a mare. He was put back into training and won four more races before being returned to stud.

== Retirement ==
Tomy Lee died in 1971. He is buried at Magdalena Farm in Lexington, Kentucky.

== Pedigree ==
Pedigree of Tomy Lee (GB), bay stallion, 1956
Sire Tudor Minstrel (GB) 1944	Owen Tudor (GB); 1938	Hyperion*	Gainsborough*
Sire Tudor Minstrel (GB) 1944	Owen Tudor (GB); 1938	Hyperion*	Selene*
Sire Tudor Minstrel (GB) 1944	Owen Tudor (GB); 1938	Mary Tudor	Pharos
Sire Tudor Minstrel (GB) 1944	Owen Tudor (GB); 1938	Mary Tudor	Anna Bolena
Sire Tudor Minstrel (GB) 1944	Sansonnet (GB); 1933	Sansovino	Swynford*
Sire Tudor Minstrel (GB) 1944	Sansonnet (GB); 1933	Sansovino	Gondolette
Sire Tudor Minstrel (GB) 1944	Sansonnet (GB); 1933	Lady Juror	Son-in-Law
Sire Tudor Minstrel (GB) 1944	Sansonnet (GB); 1933	Lady Juror	Lady Josephine
Dam Auld Alliance (GB) 1948	Brantome (FR); 1931	Blandford	Swynford*
Dam Auld Alliance (GB) 1948	Brantome (FR); 1931	Blandford	Blanche
Dam Auld Alliance (GB) 1948	Brantome (FR); 1931	Vitamine	Clarissimus
Dam Auld Alliance (GB) 1948	Brantome (FR); 1931	Vitamine	Viridiflora
Dam Auld Alliance (GB) 1948	Iona (GB); 1943	Hyperion*	Gainsborough*
Dam Auld Alliance (GB) 1948	Iona (GB); 1943	Hyperion*	Selene*
Dam Auld Alliance (GB) 1948	Iona (GB); 1943	Jiffy	Hurry On
Dam Auld Alliance (GB) 1948	Iona (GB); 1943	Jiffy	Juniata (Family: 1-n)

* Tomy Lee is inbred 3S x 3D to the stallion Hyperion, meaning that he appears third generation on the sire side of his pedigree, and third generation on the dam side of his pedigree.

* Tomy Lee is inbred 4S x 4D to the stallion Swynford, meaning that he appears fourth generation on the sire side of his pedigree, and fourth generation on the dam side of his pedigree.

== Sources ==
- 1959 Kentucky Derby
