= Silky Sullivan =

American-bred Thoroughbred racehorse

- Celebrating Silky's birthday on St. Patrick's Day with Kjell Qvale
- Sire: Sullivan
- Dam: Lady N Silk
- Damsire: Ambrose Light
- Sex: Stallion
- Foaled: 1955
- Country: USA
- Colour: Chestnut
- Breeder: Mr. & Mrs. Riley Roberts
- Owner: Phil Klipstein; Tom Ross
- Trainer: Reggie Cornell
- Record: 27: 12-1-5
- Earnings: $157,700

Major wins
- Golden Gate Futurity (making up 27 lengths) (1957); Santa Anita Derby (making up 28 lengths) (1958)

Honours
- First horse buried in the infield at Golden Gate Fields. He has since been joined by Lost in the Fog; The Silky Sullivan Handicap at Golden Gate Fields; The Silky Sullivan Award given to the top three-year-old male (Buddy Gil in 2003))
- Last updated on August 21, 2011

Silky Sullivan (February 28, 1955 – November 18, 1977) was an American thoroughbred racehorse best known for his come-from-behind racing style.

== Racing style ==
There were other great closers—Whirlaway, Stymie, Calidoscopio, Needles, Gallant Man, Carry Back, Forego, Zenyatta, and Alydar—but none could hang so far back, let the field get so far ahead, and still win. Called the "California Comet" and often ridden by Hall of Fame jockey Willie Shoemaker, Silky Sullivan once fell 41 lengths behind the field yet still won by three lengths, running the last quarter in 22 seconds. His trainer, West Coast veteran Reggie Cornell, said "I've never seen a horse in my life, or heard of one either, go faster." Cornell trained horses for movie star Betty Grable and her husband, bandleader Harry James. He was the uncle and mentor of Hall-of-Famer Ron McAnally, who trained John Henry. Willie Shoemaker once said of Silky Sullivan, "You can't do a thing with him, you just have to allow him to run his own race, at his own speed, in his own style in the first quarter or maybe the first three eighths. And you just sit there and wait, hoping you won't have to wait too long, because when he really gets going you have to be alert or he might just leave you behind—and then you hold on for dear life". Of his 27 career starts, he was in the money 18 times with 12 wins, 1 place, and 5 shows. His career earnings were $157,700 (purses were smaller in the mid-1950s).

== Bloodlines and early life ==
Bred by Pasadena, California, dentist Riley H. Roberts and his wife, Nell Frances Roberts, Silky Sullivan was foaled on February 28, 1955. The colt was chestnut, with a white star on his forehead and a front left white pastern. His English-bred sire, Sullivan, won his first start as a two-year-old and placed in his other three, including the Leopardstown Produce Stakes, before he was brought to the United States, where he won five of eight starts and finished third in the other three, including the Will Rogers Stakes. He was a respected California-sire during the 1950's. Besides Silky Sullivan, Sullivan also produced Mr. Sullivan (winner of the Haggin Stakes, California Breeders’ Trial Stakes, and San Jose Handicap), Lucky G.L. (Berkley Handicap), and Sully’s Trial (winner of her first six starts, including the Junior Miss and Santa Ynez Stakes). Silky Sullivan's dam, Lady N Silk, a non-winner of four starts, was rescued from Santa Anita Park in 1951 by Dr. Roberts before she could be destroyed due to a T-shaped crack in her left forefoot and had Fair Play blood three generations back in her pedigree. Fair Play was the sire of Man o' War, ranked #1 in Blood-Horse magazine's top 100 U.S. thoroughbred champions of the 20th Century. Her chart also shows the European sire Phalaris as the great-great-grandsire of Silky Sullivan. Lady N Silk had two foals before Silky Sullivan: the stakes-placed Doc Upton (named for the track veterinarian who notified Roberts of Lady N Silk's injury) and Lady Selene, a winner.

== Racing career ==
Silky Sullivan was sent to Three Rings Ranch in Beaumont, California to be conditioned for the yearling sales. Jack Lynaugh, in charge of the younger horses, called him "John L." after John L. Sullivan. Lynaugh said that Silky "...was all the personality he had, more than any horse I've ever handled, and I've handled thousands since starting in this business in 1932. I've always been crazy about him. When the other yearlings were let out of the paddock, Silky would wait until they were halfway across the 28-acre (11 ha) pasture, then take out after them. He always wound up on top, just like his races."

Sold at the 1956 California Thoroughbred Breeders Association's Del Mar yearling sales to Phil Klipstein (a retired cattleman from Bakersfield) and Tom Ross (a lumberman from Oakland) for $10,700, the colt was sent to Devonshire Downs in San Fernando to train under Reggie Cornell. Silky Sullivan's first race was a 5-furlong dash for maidens at Hollywood Park Racetrack on May 17, 1957. Cornell said, "He came out of the gate in a trance and a truss", and I said, here's one for the glue factory. Then all of a sudden, it was like he was stung by a bee. Until he made that big move, I thought I'd be looking for a job." His jockey, George Taniguchi, said, "He broke with the field and then it was as if he was sucked back, and I thought oh, my God, what's he doing? He was immediately 10 or 20 lengths behind the other horses. I let him go like that until the three-eighths pole and finally gave him a tap on the shoulder, and then he changed gears. I never thought we'd catch up, we were so far back, but I never rode anything like that before. We were flying." In his debut, Silky Sullivan was 8th in a field of 12 and about 8 lengths back, when he came on to win by a nose.

Popularity

"Silky Sullivan wasn't simply a racehorse; he was a folk hero. No horse in history ever captured the imagination of the public the way Ol' Silk did." (from 'He Wasn't Smooth, but He was Silky')

— Jim Murray, 1998

On December 7, 1957, he won the one mile (1.6 km) $25,000 Golden Gate Futurity after making up 27 lengths. His jockey, Hall of Famer Manuel Ycaza, said later, "When I asked him to run, he answered and ran like a machine, like a rocket. You felt there was something special because nobody had seen anything like that. It takes a lot of running when you're 20 lengths behind. You have to be greased lightning."

Silky Sullivan began his three-year-old season in a mile race on January 30, 1958. In that race, two horses had been dueling for the lead: Circle Lea, ridden by Ray York, and The Shoe (by Khaled), ridden by Willie Shoemaker. When the tote board flashed a photo finish, York was sure he'd nosed out Shoemaker. "I beat you this time, Willie," said York. "Yeah," agreed Shoemaker, "but you didn't beat that sucker on the outside." Silky Sullivan had beaten them both by a neck. Later, he came from 32 lengths behind to lose by a neck to Old Pueblo in the $67,360 California Breeders' Champion Stakes. Eddie Arcaro (who rode Old Pueblo) said, "He's just a running fool. He runs that last eighth in 10 seconds flat—or less. You feel like you're standing still. Sometimes when he comes up alongside, you are."

In Silky Sullivan's next start, on February 25, 1958, he came from 41 lengths behind to win a 6 1/2-furlong allowance race by a half-length.

=== Santa Anita Derby ===
A record crowd of 61,123 attended the Santa Anita Derby, California's major Kentucky Derby prep race, on March 8, 1958. Carrying 54 kg (118.8 pounds), Silky Sullivan faced nine other three-year-olds including Old Pueblo, who had defeated him in the Breeder's Champion Stakes. The 10-horse field for the 21st running of the Santa Anita Derby (by post position) was:

- 1. Carrier X (by Count Fleet), George Taniguchi up
- 1A. Old Pueblo (by Windy City 2), Eddie Arcaro up
- 2. McTavish (by Khaled), Henry Moreno up
- 2B. The Shoe (by Khaled), John Burton up
- 3. Silky Sullivan (by Sullivan), Bill Shoemaker up
- 3C. Harcall (by Call Bell), William Boland up
- 4. Sabredale (by Blue Swords), Ismael Valenzuela up
- 4D. Martins Rullah (by Nasrullah), Johnny Longden up
- 5. Furyvan (by Good Ending), Alex Maese up
- 6. Aliwar (by Alibhai), Ralph Neves up

During the first five furlongs, Silky Sullivan fell 26 lengths off the pace, but when Shoemaker asked him, he responded; Silky Sullivan won by 3 1/2 lengths. Shoemaker remarked, "He knows when to move inside and then out. He knows when to make his winning move." "He's so smart," added Cornell, "that he could win at five-eighths. He's got speed whenever he wants it. He just knows when to turn it on." Harcall was second, Aliwar was third, and Old Pueblo was fourth.

Speed

"Silky ran by me so fast he darn near sucked me under!" (after riding Harcall, who placed)

— Jockey Bill Boland

=== Kentucky Derby ===
The 84th Kentucky Derby was run on May 3, 1958. Silky Sullivan was joint favorite with the Jimmy Jones-trained Tim Tam, a dark-bay son of Tom Fool (ranked #11 by Blood-Horse magazine of the 100 best U.S. Thoroughbred racehorses of the 20th century) out of the winning mare Two Lea (ranked #77)—herself a daughter of Bull Lea, Calumet Farm's well-known sire. Bull Lea had already produced three Kentucky Derby winners: Citation in 1948, Hill Gail in 1952, and Iron Liege in 1957.

Refusing a purchase offer of $350,000, Silky Sullivan's owners sent him east to Kentucky. William Robertson wrote in his comprehensive, A History of Thoroughbred Racing in America, "In a field of typical thoroughbreds mincing to the post, Silky resembled a battleship under escort." Before the Kentucky Derby, he was entered in a 7-furlong prep race (the Steppingstone Purse at Churchill Downs). On a sloppy track, he made up 30 lengths and finished fourth.

CBS used a split screen for its telecast of the 1958 Kentucky Derby, since Silky Sullivan would be running far off the pace. Most of the screen was allotted to the main group of runners, but the lower right corner was given to the come-from-behind colt. Writing in 2002, sportswriter Billy Reed said: "Besides the split-screen, Fred Capossela, calling the race for CBS, mentioned Silky's name five times and Tim Tam's only once during the first mile and an eighth. At the end the score was Silky 6, Tim Tam 4."

The Kentucky Derby website describes Silky Sullivan's race: "Silky Sullivan broke well but was allowed to stride while saving ground until final turn where he made only a brief and ineffectual bid of less than a sixteenth mile and refused to extend himself thereafter." Tim Tam won the Kentucky Derby and the Preakness; in the Belmont Stakes, he broke a sesamoid bone in his right foreleg in the homestretch and finished second.

Defeat

"Nashua, Native Dancer, Man O' War, Joe Louis, Jack Dempsey—they all lost. I still think Silky is great." (Silky's exercise boy)

— Pete Kozar, 1958

== Popularity ==
With Silky Sullivan back from Kentucky, racing fans came out in the thousands to see him run—or, after his retirement following his four-year-old season, just to see the horse they called "Mr. Heart Attack". For the rest of his life, he received birthday and Christmas cards. They cheered when he was paraded each year (beginning in 1965) at Golden Gate Fields for Saint Patrick's Day and at Santa Anita for the Santa Anita Derby. He had his own secretary to answer his mail.

When the founder of San Francisco's British Motor Car Distributors, Ltd., Kjell Qvale, heard that Silky Sullivan was for sale, he made an immediate offer. In 1963, the horse became the property of Kjell, who cared for him for 14 years. Kjell (pronounced "Shell") would lead him to the winner's circle, his mane braided with green and white pom-poms; every time, ears pricked, and head held high, Silky Sullivan would turn his rump on his audience and kick out both hind legs. Speaking of that Kentucky Derby, Qvale said, "I understand he had some temperature a few days before the Derby. I don't know if that's true. He may have gone too fast too early."

At stud at Qvale's 60-acre (24 ha) Green Oaks Stud Farm in Napa Valley, 40 miles (64 km) northeast of Golden Gate Fields, Silky Sullivan sired several winners. Mr. Payne and Son of Silky (see external links for pedigrees) were both dual-stakes winners. On August 2, 1965, Mr. Payne emulated his father's come-from-behind style with victories in the Oceanside and La Jolla Handicaps. Son of Silky won the Omaha Gold Cup and the Centennial Derby. In 1968, another of his sons, Silky's Image (owned and bred by Qvale) won the Silky Sullivan Purse. At Pickmere Stud in Cheshire, England, a stallion named Pickmere Mistral is also part of Silky Sullivan's bloodline. Silky Sullivan's daughter, Silky Starlet, foaled Tromeros by Camden Town (who sired Pickmere Pure Gold, dam of Pickmere Mistral). There is considerable Silky Sullivan blood in the American Quarter Horse. Owners of good Quarter Horses brought him some of their best mares to breed for speed.

Silky Sullivan was found in his stall at his last home in Pleasanton, California, on November 18, 1977, having died in his sleep at the age of 22. Kjell Qvale was undergoing heart surgery when the horse died. Alice Campbell, wife of his last keeper (trainer Emmett Campbell), phoned the Qvale family with the news; Mrs. Qvale felt it fortunate that Kjell was still groggy when told of Silky Sullivan's death, since he loved him. "There was no horse like him," said Kjell. "He was a gentleman. He'd let children walk under his belly, let them sit on his back and kick him giddy-up...but let an adult try that, and he'd—very gently—remove them. Silky was a person, a unique person, and I miss him."

== Legacy ==
Silky Sullivan is synonymous with victory despite long odds. His name evokes holding back until the last possible moment before making a huge bid for the win, though not always successfully. Once run in March, the stakes race in his name now takes place in November: the $100,000, nine-furlong Silky Sullivan Handicap (Grade III) for 3-year-olds on the grass at California's Golden Gate Fields.

Silky Sullivan is buried at Golden Gate Fields, in the infield to the left of the tote board. He is considered by many to be the greatest closer of all time and until the death of Lost in the Fog was the only horse buried at Golden Gate Fields. In the winner's circle, a bronze plaque bears a tribute by a fan, one stanza of which reads:

Out of the gate like a bullet of red,
Dropping behind as the rest sped ahead,
Loping along as the clubhouse fans cheer,
Leisurely stalking the field in first gear.

== See also ==
- List of racehorses

== Notes ==
1. Shoemaker rode many top horses, including Swaps, Gallant Man, Round Table, Buckpasser, Damascus, Ack Ack, John Henry, Northern Dancer, and Forego. He competed against great jockeys including Johnny Longden, Eddie Arcaro, and Angel Cordero. Shoemaker died in 2003.
2. "The Thoroughbred of California" told its readers: "We vow faithfully to write of Silky Sullivan as if he were a horse. Which, of course, is ridiculous."
3. Some say it was Tom Ross who had the heart problem, but it's a certainty that one of his two owners could not watch Silky Sullivan run for fear of his life. (It seems, according to the March 17, 1958, issue of Sports Illustrated, both men had a heart condition. That must account for the confusion.)
4. "Missed him entirely," said the announcer.
5. A layer of sheepskin over a horse's nose to protect his/her eyes from dirt kicked up on the track.
6. Some say it was $500,000 and came from an Eastern syndicate who proposed that Silky Sullivan join a circus and tour the nation. Klipstein expressed interest, but Ross thought the idea was a crime. Cornell was all for it. He thought Silky Sullivan should have hit every country fair in the U.S.
7. Still hopeful, Cornell entered Silky Sullivan.
8. An ardent supporter of horse racing, Kjell Qvale was born in Norway and raised in Seattle, Washington. He served as president of the Pacific Racing Association (Golden Gate Fields) for 25 years, then as Chairman of the Board of the California Jockey Club (Bay Meadows). He also donated major medical equipment to his favorite tracks to assist with jockey and equine injuries. In his late eighties, he still went every working day to British Motors, the San Francisco company he founded in 1947, and he still ran horses at Golden Gate Fields.
9. To see Silky Sullivan's great-great-great grandson, see External links (Silky's blood flows on).
10. Tim Tam outlasted Silky Sullivan by five years, dying in 1982.
