= My Own Business =

Venezuelan Thoroughbred racehorse

My Own Business (1997–2011) was a Venezuelan thoroughbred racehorse who won several prestigious races in Venezuela.

The horse held more than thirty clásicos, and was the sole winner of three classical races in the Caribbean. His name was introduced in the Caribbean Hall of Fame.

My Own Business was born from two American thoroughbreds, Voyageur and World Medley, He ran for the first time in the La Rinconada hippodrome in Caracas, on 17 October 1998.

He won 37 races in 50 starts.

The horse's owners were the Italian entrepreneur Rocco Sebastiani, and the Venezuelan Hugo Albarrán. His trainer was Antonio Bellardi.

The horse died in 2011.
