= Silky Sullivan Handicap =

- Class: Ungraded
- Location: Golden Gate Fields; Albany, California, United States
- Inaugurated: 1976
- Race type: Thoroughbred - Flat racing
- Website: www.goldengatefields.com

Race information
- Distance: 1 1/16 miles
- Surface: Turf
- Track: Left-handed
- Qualification: Three-year-old Cal-breds
- Weight: Weight-For-Age
- Purse: $100,000

The Silky Sullivan Handicap is an American Thoroughbred horse race run each year (until recently in March, then on November 5, and now in April) at Golden Gate Fields in the San Francisco Bay Area. Named for the "Heart Attack Horse," the great closer Silky Sullivan, the race was a mile and an eighth, or 9 furlong Grade III turf race——run on grass——with a purse of $100,000 which it has retained. It is open to males or females three years of age, and runs at a distance of a mile and a sixteenth.

It is now restricted to California breeds and is no longer graded.

The race was inaugurated in 1976. Over the years its racing date has often changed due to various track schedulings. For the past few years, racing in northern California has been in a state of uncertain flux, which, for a time, forced Golden Gate Fields to cease its fall schedule. This caused the Silky Sullivan Handicap to be in temporary hiatus. The Silky Sullivan returned on May 2, 2009, the same day the Kentucky Derby was run at Churchill Downs.

Silky Sullivan died in 1977, one year later than the race in his name began, and is buried in the infield at Golden Gate Fields. The only other horse so honored is the great Lost in the Fog who died of cancer in 2006.

== Past winners ==
- 2021 - None Above the Law (1:36.75) (Evin Roman) Trained by Peter Miller
- 2019 - Irish Heatwave (1:36.60) (Irving Orozco) Trained by J. Keith Desormeaux)
- 2018 - Hardboot (1:37.33) (Juan Hernandez) Trained by Michele Dollase
- 2017 - B Squared
- 2016 - Gold Rush Dancer (1:37.07)
- 2015 - Grazen Sky (1:38.00) (Ricardo Gonzalez) Trained by Steven Miyadi.
- 2014 - Awesome Return (1:36.03) (Joseph Talamo) Trained by Mike Puype.
- 2013 - Surfcup (1:37.54) (Russell Baze) Trained by Bob Baffert.
- 2012 - Summer Hit (1:36.40) Trained by Jerry Hollendorfer. (Run at 8 furlongs)
- 2009 - Feisty Suances (1:45.39) (Kyle Kaenel) (second to Pioneerof the Nile in the 2009 San Felipe Stakes.) (Run on dirt due to rain.)
- 2008 - Not run due to schedule shifts.
- 2007 - Not run due to schedule shifts.
- 2006 - Not run due to schedule shifts.
- 2005 - Eastern Sand (Victor Espinoza, trained by Jeff Mullins)
- 2004 -
- 2003 -
- 2002 - Big Shot (Jason P. Lumpkins, trained by Racing Hall of Famer Richard Mandella)
- 2001 - Casino King (trained by Simon Bray)
- 2000 - B. Mr. Lucky (Joe M. Castro)
- 1999 - Sunday Stroll
- 1998 -
- 1997 -
- 1996 -
- 1995 -
- 1994 -
- 1993 -
- 1992 - Music Prospector (trained by Steve Miyadi)
- 1991 - Blade of the Ball
- 1990 - Avenging Force (Roberto Gonzalez)
- 1989 - Simply Majestic (5) (Ron Hansen)
- 1988 - Variety Road (5) (Russell Baze) (Owner also owned Silky Sullivan - Kjell Qvale)
- 1987 - Dormello (6) (M. Castaneda)
- 1986 - Prince Don B. (5) (M. Castaneda)
- 1985 - Nak Ack (4) (J.C. Judice)
- 1984 - Songhay (5) (J.C. Judice)
- 1983 - Buckohoy (4) (W.M. Winland)
- 1982 - Regalberto (4) (D. Sorenson)
- 1981 - Fleet Tempo (4) (Russell Baze)
- 1980 - Capt. Don (5) (D.C. Hall)
- 1979 - Crafty Native (First Division) (6) (R. Galarsa)
- 1979 - Don Alberto (Second Division) (4) (R.M. Gonzalez)
- 1978 - Alias Smith (5) (M. Castaneda)
- 1977 - Never Slipping (First Division) (5) (J. Arterburn)
- 1977 - Ga Hai (Second Division) (6) (A.L. Diaz)
- 1976 - Austin Mittler (4) (Robyn C. Smith)

== Another Silky race ==
"The Silky Sullivan Turf Special" for sophomore colts ran at least once on a New York track in August, 2005, for a $75,000 purse. In it, the Sky Mesa colt Sky Turn to Black, Kingmambo's Puppet Regime, and the Pine Bluff colt Gingobell competed in a large field. This writer has yet to discover who won, or if the race is now established, and if so, where?——or was run once, and once only.
