= Sword Dancer =

American-bred Thoroughbred racehorse

- Sword Dancer with trainer J. Elliott Burch on the Sports Illustrated issue cover dated February 22, 1960
- Sire: Sunglow
- Grandsire: Sun Again
- Dam: Highland Fling
- Damsire: By Jimminy
- Sex: Stallion
- Foaled: 1956
- Country: United States
- Colour: Chestnut
- Breeder: Brookmeade Stable
- Owner: Brookmeade Stable
- Trainer: J. Elliott Burch
- Record: 39: 15-7-4
- Earnings: $829,610

Major wins
- Mayflower Stakes (1958); Stepping Stone Purse (1959); Jockey Club Gold Cup (1959); Metropolitan Handicap (1959); Monmouth Handicap (1959); Travers Stakes (1959); Woodward Stakes (1959, 1960); Suburban Handicap (1960); Grey Lag Handicap (1960) American Classic Race placings: Kentucky Derby 2nd (1959); Preakness Stakes 2nd (1959); Belmont Stakes 1st (1959)

Awards
- U.S. Champion 3-Yr-Old Colt (1959); DRF U.S. Champion Male Handicap Horse (1959); United States Horse of the Year (1959)

Honours
- United States Racing Hall of Fame (1977) #53 - Top 100 U.S. Racehorses of the 20th Century; Sword Dancer Stakes at Saratoga Race Course (1975–2025)
- Last updated on August 10, 2025

Sword Dancer (April 24, 1956 – November 16, 1984) was an American Hall of Fame Champion Thoroughbred racehorse. He was the leading American colt of his generation and was voted United States Horse of the Year in 1959.

== Background ==
Sword Dancer was a small chestnut horse bred and owned by Isabel Dodge Sloane's Brookmeade Stable. He was trained by J. Elliott Burch.

== Racing career ==
Sword Dancer won three times in fourteen starts at age two. At age three, he began to develop and in the 1959 Kentucky Derby was beaten by a nose by Tomy Lee in a stretch duel. When Tomy Lee did not compete in the Preakness Stakes, his jockey Bill Shoemaker rode Sword Dancer to a second-place finish behind Royal Orbit. In the Belmont Stakes on June 13, Sword Dancer got the better of what was described as a "bitter stretch duel" with Bagdad to win by three-quarters of a length on a muddy track. Sword Dancer's Belmont win joined him with Alsab (1942) as the only two horses ever to win one U.S. Triple Crown race and finish second in the other two, followed in later years by Arts and Letters (1969), Bet Twice (1987), Easy Goer (1989), and Journalism (2025). Sword Dancer also won a number of other major races, including a defeat of Hillsdale in the Woodward Stakes. He also defeated 1958 Horse Of The Year Round Table for a second time (he was third in the Woodward), beating him by seven lengths in the Jockey Club Gold Cup at Aqueduct Racetrack. His performance throughout 1959 earned him Horse of the Year honors from all three of the major awarding bodies.

After a slow start at age four, Sword Dancer came on to win four important races out of his twelve starts. In one of his most notable performances, he won a second Woodward Stakes in track record time of 2:01.2 in September, beating a field that included Bald Eagle and T. V. Lark.

== Stud record ==
An ankle injury in the Man O' War Stakes ended his racing career and he was retired to stand at stud at Darby Dan Farm. Sword Dancer notably sired the Hall of Fame colt Damascus, and the filly Lady Pitt, the 1966 American Champion Three-Year-Old Filly. He was later sent to a breeding farm in France, and continued stud duties through 1976. Almost exactly 25 years from his Jockey Gold Cup win, which ended his Eclipse Award Year, he died in his sleep peacefully of natural causes at 28 years old.

== Honors ==
In 1977, Sword Dancer was inducted into the United States' National Museum of Racing and Hall of Fame. His portrait by equine artist Richard Stone Reeves can be seen in the museum's collection.

== Pedigree ==
Pedigree of Sword Dancer (USA), 1956
Sire Sunglow (USA) b. 1947	Sun Again (USA) b. 1939	Sun Teddy	Teddy
Sire Sunglow (USA) b. 1947	Sun Again (USA) b. 1939	Sun Teddy	Sunmelia
Sire Sunglow (USA) b. 1947	Sun Again (USA) b. 1939	Hug Again	Stimulus
Sire Sunglow (USA) b. 1947	Sun Again (USA) b. 1939	Hug Again	Affection
Sire Sunglow (USA) b. 1947	Rosern (USA) b. 1927	Mad Hatter	Fair Play
Sire Sunglow (USA) b. 1947	Rosern (USA) b. 1927	Mad Hatter	Madcap
Sire Sunglow (USA) b. 1947	Rosern (USA) b. 1927	Rosedrop	St Frusquin
Sire Sunglow (USA) b. 1947	Rosern (USA) b. 1927	Rosedrop	Rosaline
Dam Highland Fling (USA) b. 1950	By Jimminy (USA) b. 1941	Pharamond	Phalaris
Dam Highland Fling (USA) b. 1950	By Jimminy (USA) b. 1941	Pharamond	Selene
Dam Highland Fling (USA) b. 1950	By Jimminy (USA) b. 1941	Buginarug	Blue Larkspur
Dam Highland Fling (USA) b. 1950	By Jimminy (USA) b. 1941	Buginarug	Breakfast Bell
Dam Highland Fling (USA) b. 1950	Swing Time (USA) b. 1935	Royal Minstrel	Tetratema
Dam Highland Fling (USA) b. 1950	Swing Time (USA) b. 1935	Royal Minstrel	Harpsichord
Dam Highland Fling (USA) b. 1950	Swing Time (USA) b. 1935	Speed Boat	Man o' War
Dam Highland Fling (USA) b. 1950	Swing Time (USA) b. 1935	Speed Boat	Friars Carse
