= Royal Orbit =

American-bred Thoroughbred racehorse

- Sire: Royal Charger
- Grandsire: Nearco
- Dam: Admirals Belle
- Damsire: War Admiral
- Sex: Stallion
- Foaled: 25 April 1956
- Country: United States
- Colour: Chestnut
- Breeder: Louis B. Mayer
- Owner: Halina Gregory Braunstein
- Trainer: Reggie Cornell
- Record: 20: 7-5-7
- Earnings: $239,640

Major wins
- Los Feliz Stakes (1958) Triple Crown wins: Preakness Stakes (1959)
- Last updated on May 18, 2007

Royal Orbit (April 25, 1956 - c. 1980) was an American Thoroughbred racehorse best known as the winner of the Preakness Stakes, the second leg of the U.S. Triple Crown races.

== Background ==
Royal Orbit was a chestnut horse bred by film mogul Louis B. Mayer. He was sired by the imported British stallion Royal Charger out of Admiral's Belle, a daughter of the 1937 U.S. Triple Crown winner, War Admiral. Royal Orbit was purchased at the July Keeneland Sales by businessman Jacques Braunstein and raced by his widow, Halina Gregory Braunstein. He was trained by Reggie Cornell.

== Racing career ==
Royal Orbit was a top two-year-old colt racing in California, notably winning the 1958 Los Feliz Stakes and finishing second to Tomy Lee in the Del Mar Futurity. The following year he was second to the Hall of Fame filly Silver Spoon in the Santa Anita Derby. In his only out-of-the-money finish in twenty career races, Royal Orbit ran fourth to winner Tomy Lee in the 1959 Kentucky Derby under jockey William Harmatz. However, Royal Orbit and Harmatz came back to win the 85th running of the Preakness Stakes and in the Belmont Stakes, the final leg of the Triple Crown series, he finished third to winner Sword Dancer.

== Stud record ==
Retired at the end of the 1959 racing season, Royal Orbit stood in Kentucky and at the Maryland branch of E.P. Taylor's Windfields Farm. His offspring would meet with modest success, the best of which was multiple stakes winner, Quicken Tree. In 1971 he was sent to a breeding farm in Ireland. Two years later he was shipped to Argentina where he spent a year before going to Brazil in 1975.

== Pedigree ==
Pedigree of Royal Orbit (USA), chestnut stallion, 1956
Sire Royal Charger (GB) 1942	Nearco (ITY); 1935	Pharos	Phalaris
Sire Royal Charger (GB) 1942	Nearco (ITY); 1935	Pharos	Scapa Flow
Sire Royal Charger (GB) 1942	Nearco (ITY); 1935	Nogara	Havresac
Sire Royal Charger (GB) 1942	Nearco (ITY); 1935	Nogara	Catnip
Sire Royal Charger (GB) 1942	Sun Princess (GB); 1937	Solario	Gainsborough
Sire Royal Charger (GB) 1942	Sun Princess (GB); 1937	Solario	Sun Worship
Sire Royal Charger (GB) 1942	Sun Princess (GB); 1937	Mumtaz Begum	Blenheim
Sire Royal Charger (GB) 1942	Sun Princess (GB); 1937	Mumtaz Begum	Mumtaz Mahal
Dam Admiral's Belle (USA) 1952	War Admiral (USA); 1934	Man o'War	Fair Play
Dam Admiral's Belle (USA) 1952	War Admiral (USA); 1934	Man o'War	Mahubah
Dam Admiral's Belle (USA) 1952	War Admiral (USA); 1934	Brushup	Sweep
Dam Admiral's Belle (USA) 1952	War Admiral (USA); 1934	Brushup	Annette K
Dam Admiral's Belle (USA) 1952	Belle Cane (NZ); 1937	Beau Pere	Son-in-Law
Dam Admiral's Belle (USA) 1952	Belle Cane (NZ); 1937	Beau Pere	Cinna
Dam Admiral's Belle (USA) 1952	Belle Cane (NZ); 1937	Duck's Egg	Absurd
Dam Admiral's Belle (USA) 1952	Belle Cane (NZ); 1937	Duck's Egg	Tame Duck (Family:7-e)
