= Silver Spoon (horse) =

American-bred Thoroughbred racehorse

- Sire: Citation
- Grandsire: Bull Lea
- Dam: Silver Fog
- Damsire: Mahmoud
- Sex: Filly
- Foaled: 1956
- Country: United States
- Colour: Chestnut
- Breeder: Cornelius Vanderbilt Whitney
- Owner: C. V. Whitney
- Trainer: Robert L. Wheeler
- Record: 27 Starts: 13 – 3 - 4
- Earnings: $313,930

Major wins
- Santa Anita Derby (1959); Cinema Handicap (1959); Santa Susana Stakes (1959); La Centinela Stakes (1959); Santa Ynez Stakes (1959); Santa Margarita Handicap (1960); Vanity Handicap (1960); Santa Maria Handicap (1960); Milady Handicap (1960); Santa Monica Handicap (1960)

Awards
- TRA American Champion Three-Year-Old Filly (1959)

Honours
- U.S. Racing Hall of Fame (1978)
- Last updated on September 10, 2008

Silver Spoon (March 6, 1956 - January 1978) was a multiple stakes winning American Thoroughbred race horse.

== Background ==
Silver Spoon was a daughter of Triple Crown winner Citation. Citation was by Bull Lea, the foundation sire of Calumet Farm. Silver Spoon's dam, Silver Fog, carried the blood of Equipose, Blenheim, Man o' War, Broomstick, Peter Pan, and a host of others.

Silver Spoon was a big chestnut filly with four white stockings, standing 16 hands one inch tall, and weighing 1,135 pounds. As a foal, she injured her hip and forever after walked with a pronounced hesitation or "hitch" in her gait.

== Racing career ==
Her first race was an $8,000 claiming event for two-year-olds at Belmont Park. There were no takers. Ridden by Eldon Nelson, she won by six lengths.

Sent to California, Silver Spoon dominated her division, going undefeated in a six-race winning streak. Winning both the Santa Susana Stakes now called the Santa Anita Oaks and the Santa Anita Derby, she became one of only two fillies ever to do so. The other was the winner of the 1988 Kentucky Derby: Winning Colors. In the Santa Anita Derby, she took the race against colts. With her ears pricked, she romped home by two and a half lengths against that year's eventual Preakness Stakes winner, Royal Orbit. This was the win that convinced her connections to enter her in the 1959 Kentucky Derby. The only filly to start in the race between the years 1945 to 1980, she came in a respectable fifth, three and a half lengths behind the winner, Tomy Lee. A few months later, back on the West Coast, she soundly beat Tomy Lee in the Cinema Handicap. In the Cinema, she conceded 9 pounds to the runner-up. In the press, Silver Spoon was hailed as the best filly since the war.

== Honors ==
In the 1959 voting for Champion three-old-filly, the Thoroughbred Racing Association voted for Silver Spoon, but in the rival Daily Racing Form poll she was beaten by 85 points to 73 by Royal Native.

In the year she died, 1978, Silver Spoon was inducted into the U.S. Racing Hall of Fame. She is buried at the Gainesway Farm, once part of the C.V. Whitney Farm, beside her equals, among them Winning Colors.

== Breeding record ==
As a broodmare, Silver Spoon gave birth to seven foals. One was the stakes-winning Inca Queen by Hail To Reason.
