= Gustavo Ávila =

Venezuelan jockey (born 1938)

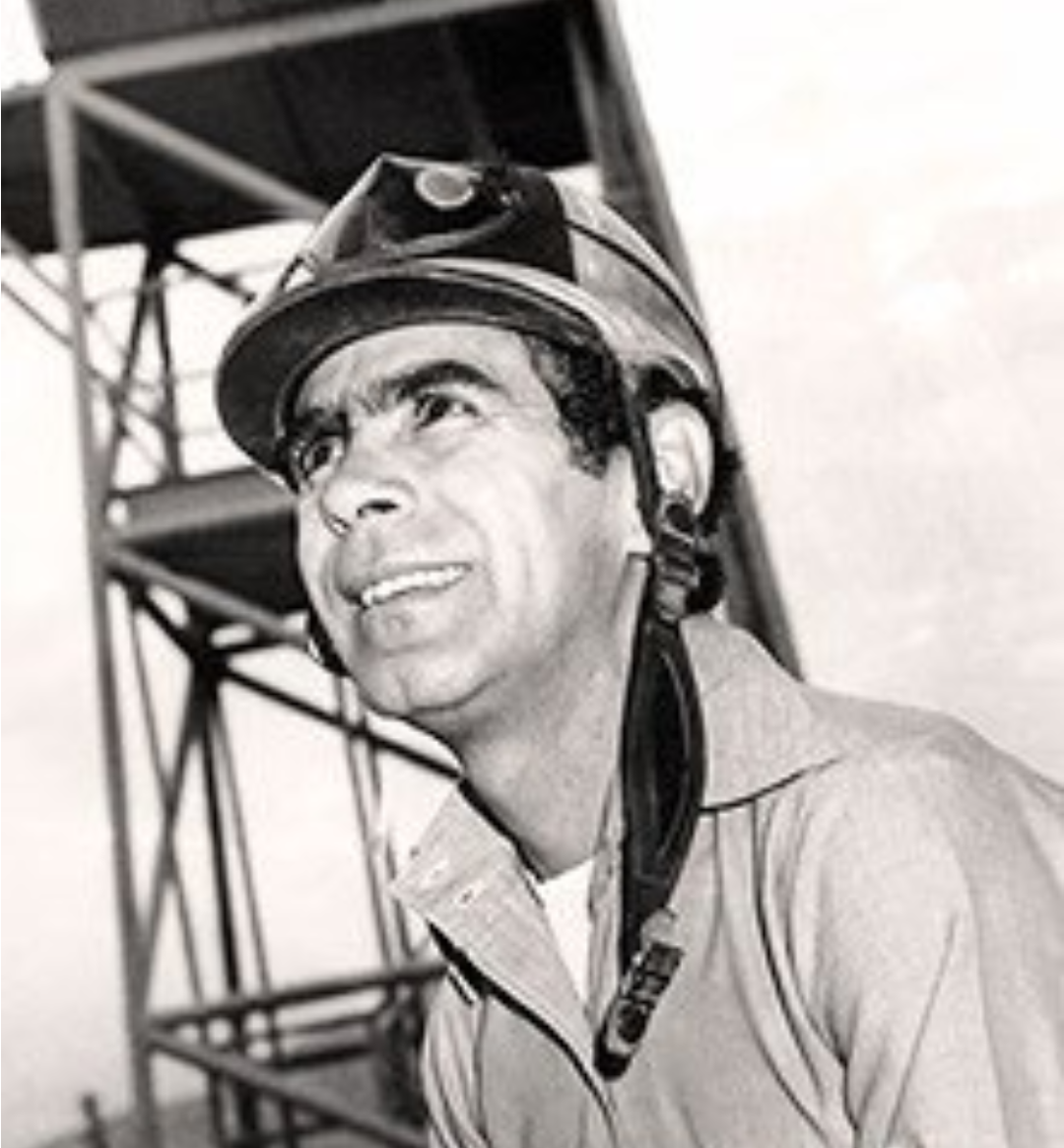

Personal information
- Born: 14 June 1938 (age 88) Caracas, Venezuela
- Occupation: Jockey

Horse racing career
- Sport: Horse racing
- Career wins: Not found

Major racing wins
- Royal Palm Handicap (1959); Clásico del Caribe (1966); Stymie Handicap (1972) American Classics wins: Kentucky Derby (1971); Preakness Stakes (1971)

Significant horses
- Canonero II, Klick, Petare, Victoreado,
- Updated on June 11, 2007

Gustavo Ávila (born June 14, 1938, in Caracas, Venezuela) is a retired jockey in Thoroughbred horse racing. He is best known as the jockey who rode Canonero II to victory in two of the 1971 U.S. Triple Crown series, the Kentucky Derby and Preakness Stakes. Among his other accomplishments, Avila was the winner of the first Clásico del Caribe (1966) with Victoreado and was the leading rider at La Rinconada Hippodrome for five years.
