= Jim French (horse) =

American-bred Thoroughbred racehorse

- Sire: Graustark
- Grandsire: Ribot
- Dam: Dinner Partner
- Damsire: Tom Fool
- Sex: Stallion
- Foaled: 1968
- Country: United States
- Colour: Dark Bay/Brown
- Breeder: Ralph C. Wilson, Jr.
- Owner: Frank Caldwell; Etta Sarant; Fred Cole; Daniel Wildenstein
- Trainer: John P. Campo
- Record: 28: 9-4-7
- Earnings: US$$394,701

Major wins
- Remsen Stakes (1970); Miami Beach Handicap (1970); Santa Anita Derby (1971); Dwyer Stakes (1971); Dade Metropolitan Handicap (1971); Bahamas Stakes (1971) American Classic Race placing: Kentucky Derby 2nd (1971); Preakness Stakes 3rd (1971); Belmont Stakes 2nd (1971)
- Last updated on November 17, 2008

Jim French (foaled in Kentucky in 1968, died in 1992), was an American Thoroughbred racehorse.

== Background ==
Jim French was bred by Ralph Wilson, owner of the National Football League Buffalo Bills. He was by Graustark and out of Dinner Partner. Despite his first-rate pedigree, Jim French was small and dull brown. He was trained by John P. Campo,

== Racing career ==
=== 1970: two-year-old season ===
As a juvenile, Jim French was put through a regimen that would be heavily criticized now. Campo put the two-year-old through 11 races in a space of four months. In November 1970 alone, he raced four times, winning the Remsen Stakes.

In December, Campo took Jim French to Florida in order to prepare him for the Kentucky Derby. On December 26, 1970, Jim French fought Sir Dagonet for a win in the Miami Beach Handicap at Tropical Park.

=== 1971: three-year-old season ===
In early January, Jim French won the Dade Metropolitan Handicap by a nose, carrying top weight. Eleven days later, he closed fast in the Hibiscus Stakes at Hialeah to finish second to Executioner. Another two weeks later, coming from 10th place, Jim French ran past His Majesty in the Bahamas Stakes. Two weeks later, he was a head behind His Majesty in the Everglades Stakes. Another two weeks later, he finished third behind Executioner, coming from 19 lengths back in the Flamingo Stakes.

Campo shipped Jim French to New York to run 17 days later in the Bay Shore Stakes against Hoist The Flag, which he won in 1:21. One week later in Florida, he ran in the Florida Derby finishing third to Eastern Fleet. Jim French was flown to California to run one week later in the Santa Anita Derby, which he won. Back in New York two weeks later, he came in fourth in the Wood Memorial.

Jim French had competed in 10 stakes in over four months. Now he arrived in Kentucky to race in the Kentucky Derby. In the Derby, he was a fast-closing second to Canonero II, beating Bold Reason. In Canonero II's track record-breaking Preakness Stakes, Jim French was third. In the Belmont Stakes, he again came on fast to take second to Pass Catcher.

Campo entered Jim French in the Arlington Classic (then called the Pontiac Grand Prix), where he was fourth. Three weeks later, again shipped to California, he placed in the Hollywood Derby, losing to Bold Reason, who carried thirteen fewer pounds. One week later in New York, Jim French won the Dwyer Stakes, giving away 12 to 15 pounds to the rest of the field. In this time span, he was never less than fourth (not counting one disqualification). He ran at 10 tracks in six states and flew across the country four times. Four weeks later, he was ninth in the Monmouth Handicap (now called the Philip H. Iselin Stakes). After the race, he was found to have a spur in his right knee. Rumors flew that Jim French had "been got to." His owner claimed the horse had lost by "a nefarious act."

Jim French went to Saratoga Springs, New York, for the Travers Stakes. Before he could race, he was impounded by the Saratoga County sheriff's office, and his entry was refused by the track's stewards. State steward Francis P. Dunne called it "...the most complex racing situation I've ever encountered." Jim French seemed to be owned by two people: Frank Caldwell and Etta Sarant. Caldwell proclaimed early in August 1971 that he had sold a 70% interest in the horse to Mrs. George Sarant, wife of a Long Island automobile dealer. Jim French ran in the name of Etta Sarant at Monmouth, where he finished ninth in the $100,000 Monmouth Invitational, but when he was shipped back to Saratoga it was revealed by New York racing officials that Mrs. Sarant did not have a New York owner's license. Campo said at the time that the Sarants, after only a few weeks of ownership, had let their 70% go to Fred R. Cole, a construction executive from Long Island. Cole wired the NYRA stewards on the eve of the Travers in an attempt to satisfy them of the legitimacy of his ownership of the horse and his eligibility to run Travers Stakes the next day. However, the appeal to the stewards was too late as entries for the Travers had closed the morning prior. When Caldwell took out a bank loan from the Citizens National Bank, he stated that he was the sole owner. The bank advanced him $130,000. A director of the bank, Leslie Combs II, was also assured that Jim French would stand at his Spendthrift Farm in Lexington, Kentucky, when his racing days were over. Citizens Bank discovered that the horse's true owner was R. Robert LiButti (also known as Robert Presti). LiButti had been barred from racing in 1968.

== Stud record ==
Having missed the Travers, Jim French was sold to art dealer Daniel Wildenstein for $1 million and retired to Haras de la Verrerie in France. Not proving successful at stud (although he sired Jimka, dam to Jim And Tonic, one of only ten horses ever selected for the French Horse Racing Hall of Fame), he then went to Japan in 1979.

Jim French, called a "road warrior" by Steve Haskin of The Blood-Horse magazine, died in 1992.
