= Copa Confraternidad del Caribe =

- Class: Grade I Stakes
- Location: Variable
- Inaugurated: 1974
- Race type: Thoroughbred
- Website: ClasicoCaribe.Org

Race information
- Distance: 1 1/4 miles (2,000 m)
- Surface: Dirt
- Track: Left-handed
- Qualification: 3-year-old and plus
- Purse: US$100,000

The Copa Confraternidad del Caribe is the second most important race in the Caribbean Series festival.

== Winners ==
Year	Host Track	Winner	Jockey	Trainer	Owner	Time	Notes
2023	(Panama) Presidente Remón	(Venezuela) El De Froix	Irad Ortiz Jr.	Ricardo D'Angelo	Stud Perseverancia	2:03:85	
2022	(Venezuela) La Rinconada	(Venezuela) El De Froix	José Ortiz	Juan Carlos Garcia	Stud Alvajos	2:03.96	
2021	(Puerto Rico) Camarero	(Mexico) El Santo	Ricardo Santana Jr.	Jaime Rionda	Cuadra J.R.R	2:06.75	
2020	**Not held**						
2019	(United States) Gulfstream Park	(Mexico) Kukulkan	Irad Ortiz Jr.	Fausto Gutierrez	St. George Stable LLC	2:04.19	Held over 1 1/4 miles (2.000 meters)
2018	(United States) Gulfstream Park	(Mexico) Jala Jala	Irad Ortiz Jr.	Fausto Gutierrez	Cuadra San Jorge	2:08.46	Held over 1 1/4 miles (2.000 meters)
2017	(United States) Gulfstream Park	(Panama) El Tigre Mono	John R. Velazquez	Carlos Espino	Stud Marathon	2:05.69	Held over 1 1/4 miles (2.000 meters)
2016	(Puerto Rico) Camarero	(Puerto Rico) Arquitecto	Irad Ortiz Jr.	Jose Dan Velez	Establo Rafanil	2:08.84	Held over 1 1/4 miles (2.000 meters)
2015	(Panama) Presidente Remón	(Mexico) Eclaire	Luis A. Contreras	Fausto Gutiérrez	Cuadra San Jorge	2:08.42	Held over 1 1/4 miles (2.000 meters)
2014	(Venezuela) La Rinconada	(Puerto Rico) Don Carlos R	David Rosario	Ramon Morales	Costazul Racing	2:07.03	Held over 1 1/4 miles (2.000 meters)
2013	(Panama) Presidente Remón	(Panama) Dicky's Angel	Luis E. Arango	Alberto Paz Rodríguez	Stud Car-12	2:06.93	Held over 1 1/4 miles (2.000 meters)
2012	(Puerto Rico) Camarero	(Venezuela) King Carlos Juan	Jean Carlos Rodriguez	Carlos Arteaga	Stud Santanita	2:08.30	Held over 1 1/4 miles (2.000 meters)
2011	(Panama) Presidente Remón	(Venezuela) Tato Zeta	Richard Bracho	Juan Carlos Ávila	Stud Los Amigos	2:09.90	Held over 1 1/4 miles (2.000 meters)
2010	(Venezuela) La Rinconada	(Venezuela) El Decano	J. C. Rodriguez	Cezar Cachazo	Los Federales	2:03.4/5	Held over 1 1/4 miles (2.000 meters)
2009	(Puerto Rico) Camarero	(Puerto Rico) Soy Conquistador	Ramon Vazquez	Maxino Gomez	Establo Edelsam	2:07.36	Held over 1 1/4 miles (2.000 meters)
2008	(Puerto Rico) Camarero	(Venezuela) Taconeo	Santiago Gonzalez	Gustavo Delgado	Establo Paula-C	2:03.97	Held over 1 1/4 miles (2.000 meters)
2007	(Puerto Rico) Camarero	(Venezuela) Gran Estefania	Emisael Jaramillo	Gustavo Delgado	Stud Tite Loy	2:02.30	Held over 1 1/4 miles (2.000 meters)
2006	(Puerto Rico) El Comandante	(Jamaica) Miracle Man	Cecilio Penalba	Allan E. Williams	Joseph Duany	1:59.20	Held over 1 3/16 miles (1.900 meters)
2005	(Puerto Rico) El Comandante	(Venezuela) Paso Real	Angel Castillo	Julio Ayala	Abi-Car-Leo	2:00.66	Held over 1 3/16 miles (1.900 meters)
2004	(Puerto Rico) El Comandante	(Venezuela) Arzak	Rafael Torrealba	Julio Ayala	Stud Papa Juan	1:59.47	Held over 1 3/16 miles (1.900 meters)
2003	(Puerto Rico) El Comandante	(Venezuela) My Own Business	Angel Castillo	Antonio Bellardi	Stud Fantasia	2:01.07	Held over 1 3/16 miles (1.900 meters)
2002	(Puerto Rico) El Comandante	(Venezuela) My Own Business	Emisael Jaramillo	Antonio Bellardi	Stud Fantasia	1:59.35	Held over 1 3/16 miles (1.900 meters)
2001	(Puerto Rico) El Comandante	(Puerto Rico) Gran Duque	John Bisono	Ramon Morales	Dr. Jose Lazaga	2:02.59	Held over 1 3/16 miles (1.900 meters)
2000	(Puerto Rico) El Comandante	(Venezuela) High Security	Emisael Jaramillo	Ali M. Ayubi	Stud Ayubi Flores	2:00.18	Held over 1 3/16 miles (1.900 meters)
1999	(Panama) Presidente Remón	(Ecuador) Senorita	Johnny Rojas	Jose Mendez	Ing. Santiago Salem	2:08.00	
1998	(Trinidad and Tobago) Santa Rosa Park	(Panama) Steffany's	Jesus Barria	Alberto Paz Rodriguez	Oscar Teran	2:08.3/5	
1997	**Not held**						
1996	(Puerto Rico) El Comandante	(Panama) Man On The Moon	Roberto Perez	Roberto Arango	Stud San Marino	2:01.05	Held over 1 3/16 miles (1.900 meters)
1995	(Dominican Republic) V Centenário	(Dominican Republic) El Incorruptible	Melvin Toro	Rafael Castro	Establo Candice	2:00.2/5	
1994	(Puerto Rico) El Comandante	(Puerto Rico) Verset's Jet	Andy Hernandez	Pablo Schneider	Establo Mandarria	1:58.1/5	Held over 1 3/16 miles (1.900 meters)
1993	(Puerto Rico) El Comandante	(Panama) Patricio	Cornelio Velásquez	Alberto Paz Rodriguez	Stud San Patricio	1:59.3/5	Held over 1 3/16 miles (1.900 meters)
1992	(Puerto Rico) El Comandante	(Panama) By Pass	Cornelio Velásquez	Alberto Paz Rodriguez	Stud Semucho	2:00.1/5	Held over 1 3/16 miles (1.900 meters)
1991	(Puerto Rico) El Comandante	(Panama) Espaviento	Roberto Perez	Andy Farrugia	Stud Liz	1:58.2/5	Held over 1 3/16 miles (1.900 meters)
1990	(Venezuela) Santa Rita	(Venezuela) Mon Coquette	Juan V. Tovar	Agustin Bezara	Maria Esperanza de Miglietti	1:36.2/5	Fillies only; held over 1 mile (1.600 meters)
1990	(Venezuela) Santa Rita	(Venezuela) Randy	Juan V. Tovar	Manuel Azpurua	Stud La Fontonera	2:06.2/5	Colts only
1989	(Puerto Rico) El Comandante	(Mexico) In Bold	Daniel Flores	Jaime Alexander	Lazaro Barreras	1:58.4/5	Held over 1 3/16 miles (1.900 meters)
1988	(Mexico) Caliente	(Mexico) Forindi	Jose Alferez	Alfredo Márquez	Jorge Inzunza	2:02.1/5	
1987	**Not held**						
1986	(Mexico) Caliente	(Colombia) Marroquin	Jose Garcia	Manuel Munar	Haras Santa Lucia	2:03.0	
1985	(Venezuela) La Rinconada	(Venezuela) Indudable	Miguel V. Blanco	Julio Ayala	Stud Valecito	2:06.4/5	
1976–1984	**Not held**						
1975	(Venezuela) La Rinconada	(Venezuela) Gran Tiro	Angel F. Parra	Antonio Algarbe	Stud Tiro	2:08.4/5	
1974	(Puerto Rico) El Comandante	(Panama) Eugenio	Ruben Hernandez	Andres Ferrugia	Amelia O. de Lopez	N/A	Held over 3/4 mile (1.200 meters)
