= Cañonero II =

Thoroughbred race horse, winner of the 1971 Kentucky Derby and Preakness Stakes

- Sire: Pretendre
- Grandsire: Doutelle
- Dam: Dixieland II
- Damsire: Nantallah
- Sex: Stallion
- Foaled: April 24, 1968
- Died: November 11, 1981 (aged 13)
- Country: Venezuela
- Colour: Bay
- Breeder: Edward B. Benjamin
- Owner: Pedro Batista; King Ranch (late 1971)
- Trainer: Juan Arias; Buddy Hirsch (1972)
- Record: 23: 9-3-4
- Earnings: $360,804

Major wins
- Stymie Handicap (1972) Triple Crown Race wins: Kentucky Derby (1971); Preakness Stakes (1971)

Awards
- U.S. Champion 3-Yr-Old Colt (1971)
- Last updated on September 27, 2006

Cañonero II (April 24, 1968 – November 11, 1981) was a Venezuelan champion Thoroughbred race horse that may be best remembered for winning the first two legs of the 1971 U.S. Triple Crown, the Kentucky Derby and the Preakness Stakes.

== Background ==
Bred by Edward B. Benjamin in Greensboro, North Carolina, the bay colt was born with a noticeably crooked foreleg, so was considered to have no future in racing. He was sold as a yearling for $1,200 at the Keeneland Sales to Venezuelan breeders Ramon Echegaray and Luis Navas. Purchased by Edgar Caibett, the horse was shipped to his owner's native Venezuela, where he earned an undistinguished record racing as a two-year-old in La Rinconada Hippodrome.

== Triple Crown races ==
Because of his breeding, Cañonero II qualified for the Kentucky Derby, the most prestigious event in United States Thoroughbred horse racing. Trained by Juan Arias and ridden by jockey Gustavo Avila, in the spring of 1971, the horse was shipped to Louisville, Kentucky, for the big race. There, Cañonero II was dismissed as a horse that did not belong in such elite company and was listed at the bottom of the pack of the betting odds as part of a six-horse pool.

In the Derby's 20-horse field, Cañonero II shocked everyone by coming from 18th place to storm past the competition, easily winning the race by 3 3/4 lengths. Arguably the most astonishing upset in the race's history was deemed a fluke by many of horse racing's experts, who predicted Cañonero II would never win another race. However, in the Preakness Stakes, the second of the Triple Crown races, Cañonero II won again.

The third leg of the Triple Crown, the Belmont Stakes held near New York City, was run before the largest crowd in its history. The stands were filled with members of the city's large Latino community, there to cheer on their new hero. However, due to a foot infection that had bothered the horse for several days, Cañonero II, after taking the race lead, struggled across the finish line in fourth place. Despite this loss, he was named the winner of the 1971 Eclipse Award for Outstanding Three-Year-Old Male Horse.

== Later career ==
Sold to Robert J. Kleberg III for $1,000,000, Cañonero II was nursed back to health by Hall of Fame trainer Buddy Hirsch. The following year in the Stymie Handicap at Belmont Park, he set a track record while defeating the great three-year-old champion Riva Ridge.

Retired to stud at the end of 1972, Cañonero II died in 1981.

Pedigree of Cañonero II
Sire Pretendre	Doutelle	Prince Chevalier	Prince Rose
Sire Pretendre	Doutelle	Prince Chevalier	Chevalerie
Sire Pretendre	Doutelle	Above Board	Straight Deal
Sire Pretendre	Doutelle	Above Board	Feola
Sire Pretendre	Limicola	Verso	Pinceau
Sire Pretendre	Limicola	Verso	Variete
Sire Pretendre	Limicola	Uccello	Donatello II
Sire Pretendre	Limicola	Uccello	Great Tit
Dam Dixieland II	Nantallah	Nasrullah	Nearco
Dam Dixieland II	Nantallah	Nasrullah	Mumtaz Begum
Dam Dixieland II	Nantallah	Shimmer	Flares
Dam Dixieland II	Nantallah	Shimmer	Broad Ripple
Dam Dixieland II	Ragtime Band	Johnstown	Jamestown
Dam Dixieland II	Ragtime Band	Johnstown	La France
Dam Dixieland II	Ragtime Band	Martial Air	Man o' War
Dam Dixieland II	Ragtime Band	Martial Air	Baton
