= Reggie Cornell =

Canadian horse trainer (1922–1979)

Personal information
- Born: August 1, 1922 Oakville, Ontario, Canada
- Died: February 21, 1979 (aged 56)
- Occupation: Trainer / Owner

Horse racing career
- Sport: Horse racing
- Career wins: Not found

Major racing wins
- Victoria Stakes (1943); Palomar Handicap (1952); Del Mar Handicap (1955, 1956, 1958); Escondido Handicap (1955); Santa Barbara Handicap (1955); Santa Catalina Handicap (1955); Del Mar Debutante Stakes (1956); Del Mar Futurity (1956); Golden Gate Futurity (1956, 1957); Strub Stakes (1957); Santa Anita Derby (1958); Sunset Handicap (1963); Queens County Handicap (1970); Vosburgh Stakes (1970); Arlington Classic (1971); Florida Derby (1971); Juvenile Stakes (1971, 1973, 1975); Lamplighter Handicap (1971); Leonard Richards Stakes (1971); Long Branch Stakes (1971); National Stallion Stakes (1971); National Stallion Stakes (filly division) (1971); Saratoga Special Stakes (1971); Hialeah Turf Cup Handicap (1972, 1973); Bougainvillea Handicap (1973); Tremont Stakes (1973); Tyro Stakes (1973); Youthful Stakes (1973, 1975); Sanford Stakes (1975) American Classic Race wins: Preakness Stakes (1959)

Racing awards
- Leading trainer at Santa Anita Park (1956); Leading trainer at Hollywood Park (1958); Leading trainer at Fairplex Park (1960, 1961, 1962)

Significant horses
- Silky Sullivan, Royal Orbit, Eastern Fleet

Reginald "Reggie" Cornell (August 1, 1922 - February 21, 1979) was a Thoroughbred horse racing trainer who competed in his native Canada before working for many years in the United States.

Born in Oakville, Ontario, Reggie Cornell grew up in Niagara Falls, Ontario. At age sixteen he began working at racetracks as a hot walker and three years later in 1941became a licensed Canadian trainer. The following year he took charge of the Canadian racing operations for American-based trainer, Horatio Luro. In that fall of 1942, Luro brought Cornell to New York where he obtained his trainers' license and won a remarkable twenty-seven races over a forty-two-day period. In 1943, Cornell got his first big win in Canada when he won the Victoria Stakes at Old Woodbine Racetrack in Toronto. During the mid-1940s he was training stables at racetracks along the East Coast of the United States.

An uncle by marriage to Ron McAnally, in 1948 Cornell took the sixteen-year-old future Hall of Fame trainer out of an orphanage where he had lived since the death of his mother. Cornell gave McAnally a job with his stable at New Hampshire's Rockingham Park where the boy learned the horse racing business, first as a hot walker and groom and then later as the stable's foreman. In 1949, Reggie Cornell began operating a public stable at Santa Anita Park in Arcadia, California. He would eventually have a number of high-profile clients, including Lin Howard, actress Betty Grable and bandleader Harry James. On January 29, 1953, Cornell saddled three winners, each for a different client. He was the leading trainer at Santa Anita during the 1955–1956 season, at Del Mar Racetrack in 1958, and won three consecutive Fairplex Park titles from 1960 through 1962.

While not Cornell's best runner, in 1958 Silky Sullivan brought him massive national media attention, particularly following his entry in the Kentucky Derby. The colt had a history of trailing the field by huge distances before coming back to win. Silky Sullivan had come from behind by as many as forty-one lengths to win. The colt became a Derby contender after he came from far back to win California's most important race for three-year-olds, the Santa Anita Derby. Silky Sullivan finished twelfth in the Derby and eighth in the Preakness Stakes.

The following year, Cornell returned to the U.S. Triple Crown series with Royal Orbit, a colt bred by Louis B. Mayer and owned by Helena Gregory Braunstein. Fourth in the 1959 Kentucky Derby after a rough start but strong comeback drive, Royal Orbit then gave Cornell the biggest win of his career with a victory in the second leg of the Triple Crown, the Preakness Stakes.

After twenty-two years operating a public stable, in 1971 Reggie Cornell was hired by Lucille Markey to take over as head trainer for her fabled Calumet Farm. That year he had two runners in the Kentucky Derby. Eastern Fleet, who had won the 1971 Florida Derby finished fourth in the Derby and second in the Preakness Stakes. His second Calumet horse, Bold and Able, finished eighth in the Derby. Although Cornell won a number of other important races for Calumet, including the 1971 Arlington Classic and Saratoga Special Stakes plus back-to-back editions of the Hialeah Turf Cup Handicap in 1972 and 1973, and the 1975 Sanford Stakes, he left Calumet in May 1976 and after considering four offers, returned to running a stable for himself.

Reggie Cornell died on February 21, 1979, following his second stroke in a matter of days. His residence at the time of his death was in his widow Elvin's hometown of the Latonia section of Covington, Kentucky, and is where he is buried.
