= La Rinconada Hippodrome =

Race track in Coche, Caracas, Venezuela

Coordinates: 10°26′12″N 66°56′2″W

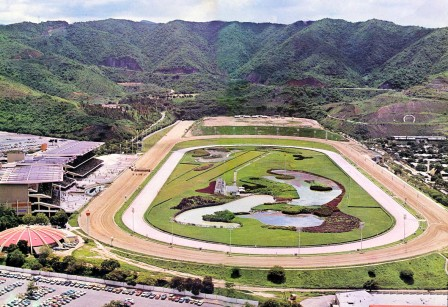
La Rinconada Hippodrome

La Rinconada Hippodrome (Spanish: Hipódromo La Rinconada) is a race track for Thoroughbred horse racing located in Coche, a neighborhood of south Caracas, Venezuela. It was designed by Arthur Froehlich and opened on July 5, 1959. This track is the #1 course in the country known to host a number of major races with some of the best jockeys in the world participating every year.

Some of the important races held here annually include:

- Clásico Internacional Propietarios de La Rinconada (Grade 1)
- Gran Premio Clásico Simón Bolívar (Grade 1)
- Clásico Fuerza Armada Bolivariana (former Clásico Fuerzas Armadas)
- Clásico Antonio Jose de Sucre
- Copa Internacional Cruz del Avila
- Clásico Republica de Venezuela
- Clásico Internacional Jockey Club de Venezuela (Gr. 1)

On the race track grounds is also the Poliedro de Caracas as well as the Alejandro Otero Museum (Museo de Artes Visuales Alejandro Otero).
