= 2015 Breeders' Cup Challenge series =

Series of horse races

The 2015 Breeders' Cup Challenge series provided winners of the designated races an automatic "Win and You're In" Berth in the 2015 Breeders' Cup. Races were chosen by the Breeders' Cup organization and included key prep races in the various Breeders' Cup divisions from around the world.

In 2015, eight new races were added to the series: the Gran Premio Criadores, Fleur de Lis Handicap, Sussex Stakes, Sword Dancer Invitational, Spinaway, Princess Rooney Handicap, Smile Sprint Handicap, and T. Von Zastrow Stutenpreis. Eighteen races in the series were telecast by NBC.

For 2015, 39 entrants in the Breeders’ Cup qualified via the Challenge series with six winning their respective divisions:

- American Pharoah, who qualified for the Classic by winning the Haskell
- Stephanie's Kitten, who won the Flower Bowl to qualify for the Filly & Mare Turf
- Nyquist, winner of the FrontRunner and Juvenile
- Songbird, winner of the Chandelier and Juvenile Fillies
- Runhappy, who qualified for the Sprint by winning the Phoenix Stakes
- Catch a Glimpse, who won the Natalma to qualify for the Juvenile Fillies Turf

Several prominent winners of the challenge series races did not start in the 2015 Breeders' Cup due to injury or illness. Most notably, Beholder, who had won three challenge series races, was scratched from the Classic after she developed a fever then bled following a routine workout. Rock Fall, who was a favorite for the Sprint after qualifying in the Vosburgh, was injured during a routine workout and was euthanized.

The winners of the 2015 Breeders' Cup Challenge series races are shown below. The last column shows whether the horse was subsequently entered in the Breeders' Cup, and if so, whether they achieved a top three finish.

Month	Race	Track	Location	Division	Winner	BC Result
January	Paddock Stakes	Kenilworth	South Africa	Breeders' Cup Filly & Mare Turf	Futura	not entered
January	Queen's Plate	Kenilworth	South Africa	Breeders' Cup Mile	Inara	not entered
April	Doncaster Mile	Randwick	Australia	Breeders' Cup Mile	Kermadec	not entered
April	TJ Smith Stakes	Randwick	Australia	Breeders' Cup Turf Sprint	Chautauqua	not entered
April	Queen Elizabeth Stakes	Randwick	Australia	Breeders' Cup Turf	Criterion	not entered
May	es:Gran Premio Criadores	Palermo	Argentina	Breeders' Cup Distaff	Furia Cruzada	not entered
May	Gran Premio 25 de Mayo	San Isidro	Argentina	Breeders' Cup Turf	Ordak Dan	entered
June	Metropolitan Handicap	Belmont Park	New York	Breeders' Cup Dirt Mile	Honor Code	entered Classic
June	Ogden Phipps Stakes	Belmont Park	New York	Breeders' Cup Distaff	Wedding Toast	entered
June	Grande Prêmio Brasil	Hipódromo da Gávea	Brazil	Breeders' Cup Turf	Barola	not entered
June	Stephen Foster Handicap	Churchill Downs	Kentucky	Breeders' Cup Classic	Noble Bird	not entered
June	Fleur de Lis Handicap	Churchill Downs	Kentucky	Breeders' Cup Distaff	Frivolous	entered
June	Shoemaker Mile	Santa Anita	California	Breeders' Cup Mile	Talco	not entered
June	The Gold Cup at Santa Anita	Santa Anita	California	Breeders' Cup Classic	Hard Aces	entered
June	Takarazuka Kinen	Hanshin	Japan	Breeders' Cup Turf	Lovely Day	not entered
July	Princess Rooney Handicap	Gulfstream Park	Florida	Breeders' Cup Filly & Mare Sprint	Merry Meadow	not entered
July	Smile Sprint Handicap	Gulfstream Park	Florida	Breeders' Cup Sprint	Favorite Tale	3rd
July	Belmont Oaks Invitational Stakes	Belmont Park	New York	Breeders' Cup Filly & Mare Turf	Lady Eli	injured
July	King George VI and Queen Elizabeth Stakes	Ascot	England	Breeders' Cup Turf	Postponed	not entered
July	Sussex Stakes	Goodwood	England	Breeders' Cup Mile	Solow	not entered
July	Clement L. Hirsch Stakes	Del Mar	California	Breeders' Cup Distaff	Beholder	entered Classic
July	Bing Crosby Handicap	Del Mar	California	Breeders' Cup Sprint	Wild Dude	entered
July	Haskell Invitational	Monmouth	New Jersey	Breeders' Cup Classic	American Pharoah	1st
August	Whitney Handicap	Saratoga	New York	Breeders' Cup Classic	Honor Code	3rd
August	Beverly D. Stakes	Arlington	Illinois	Breeders' Cup Filly & Mare Turf	Watsdachances	entered
August	Arlington Million	Arlington	Illinois	Breeders' Cup Turf	The Pizza Man	entered
August	Prix Jacques Le Marois	Deauville	France	Breeders' Cup Mile	Esoterique	entered
August	Juddmonte International	York	England	Breeders' Cup Turf	Arabian Queen	not entered
August	Yorkshire Oaks	York	England	Breeders' Cup Filly & Mare Turf	Pleascach	not entered
August	Nunthorpe Stakes	York	England	Breeders' Cup Turf Sprint	Mecca's Angel	not entered
August	Pacific Classic	Del Mar	California	Breeders' Cup Classic	Beholder	scratched
August	Del Mar Handicap	Del Mar	California	Breeders' Cup Turf	Big John B	entered
August	Pat O'Brien Handicap	Del Mar	California	Breeders' Cup Dirt Mile	Appealing Tale	not entered
August	Personal Ensign Stakes	Saratoga	New York	Breeders' Cup Distaff	Sheer Drama	entered
August	Ballerina Stakes	Saratoga	New York	Breeders' Cup Filly & Mare Sprint	Unbridled Forever	not entered
August	Sword Dancer Invitational	Saratoga	New York	Breeders' Cup Turf	Flintshire	not entered
August	Forego Stakes	Saratoga	New York	Breeders' Cup Sprint	Private Zone	2nd
September	T. Von Zastrow Stutenpreis	Baden-Baden	Germany	Breeders' Cup Filly & Mare Turf	Shivajia	not entered
September	Spinaway Stakes	Saratoga	New York	Breeders' Cup Juvenile Fillies	Rachel's Valentina	2nd
September	Grosser Preis von Baden	Baden-Baden	Germany	Breeders' Cup Turf	Prince Gibraltar	not entered
September	Matron Stakes	Leopardstown	Ireland	Breeders' Cup Filly & Mare Turf	Legatissimo	2nd
September	Irish Champion Stakes	Leopardstown	Ireland	Breeders' Cup Turf	Golden Horn	2nd
September	Juvenile Turf Stakes	Leopardstown	Ireland	Breeders' Cup Juvenile Turf	Johannes Vermeer	not entered
September	Moyglare Stud Stakes	Curragh	Ireland	Breeders' Cup Juvenile Fillies Turf	Minding	not entered
September	Pocahontas Stakes	Churchill Downs	Kentucky	Breeders' Cup Juvenile Fillies	Dothraki Queen	3rd
September	Iroquois Stakes	Churchill Downs	Kentucky	Breeders' Cup Juvenile	Cocked and Loaded	entered
September	Canadian Stakes	Woodbine	Canada	Breeders' Cup Filly & Mare Turf	Strut the Course	not entered
September	Woodbine Mile	Woodbine	Canada	Breeders' Cup Mile	Mondialiste	2nd
September	Natalma Stakes	Woodbine	Canada	Breeders' Cup Juvenile Fillies Turf	Catch A Glimpse	1st
September	Summer Stakes	Woodbine	Canada	Breeders' Cup Juvenile Turf	Conquest Daddyo	entered
September	Rockfel Stakes	Newmarket	England	Breeders' Cup Juvenile Fillies Turf	Promising Run	not entered
September	Royal Lodge Stakes	Newmarket	England	Breeders' Cup Juvenile Turf	Foundation	not entered
October	Flower Bowl Invitational Stakes	Belmont Park	New York	Breeders' Cup Filly & Mare Turf	Stephanie's Kitten	1st
October	Joe Hirsch Turf Classic Invitational Stakes	Belmont Park	New York	Breeders' Cup Turf	Big Blue Kitten	3rd
October	Vosburgh Stakes	Belmont Park	New York	Breeders' Cup Sprint	Rock Fall	injured
October	Awesome Again Stakes	Santa Anita	California	Breeders' Cup Classic	Smooth Roller	scratched
October	FrontRunner Stakes	Santa Anita	California	Breeders' Cup Juvenile	Nyquist	1st
October	Chandelier Stakes	Santa Anita	California	Breeders' Cup Juvenile Fillies	Songbird	1st
October	Rodeo Drive Stakes	Santa Anita	California	Breeders' Cup Filly & Mare Turf	Photo Call	entered
October	Zenyatta Stakes	Santa Anita	California	Breeders' Cup Distaff	Beholder	entered Classic
October	Prix de l'Opéra	Longchamp	France	Breeders' Cup Filly & Mare Turf	Covert Love	not entered
October	Prix Jean-Luc Lagardère	Longchamp	France	Breeders' Cup Juvenile Turf	Ultra	not entered
October	Prix Marcel Boussac	Longchamp	France	Breeders' Cup Juvenile Fillies Turf	Ballydoyle	not entered
October	Alcibiades Stakes	Keeneland	Kentucky	Breeders' Cup Juvenile Fillies	Gomo	not entered
October	Phoenix Stakes	Keeneland	Kentucky	Breeders' Cup Sprint	Runhappy	1st
October	Champagne Stakes	Belmont Park	New York	Breeders' Cup Juvenile	Greenpointcrusader	entered
October	Frizette Stakes	Belmont Park	New York	Breeders' Cup Juvenile Fillies	Nickname	entered
October	Jockey Club Gold Cup	Belmont Park	New York	Breeders' Cup Classic	Tonalist	entered
October	Shadwell Turf Mile Stakes	Keeneland	Kentucky	Breeders' Cup Mile	Grand Arch	3rd
October	Breeders' Futurity Stakes	Keeneland	Kentucky	Breeders' Cup Juvenile	Brody's Cause	3rd
October	Thoroughbred Club of America Stakes	Keeneland	Kentucky	Breeders' Cup Filly & Mare Sprint	Fioretti	entered
October	Santa Anita Sprint Championship	Santa Anita	California	Breeders' Cup Sprint	Wild Dude	entered
October	Bourbon Stakes	Keeneland	Kentucky	Breeders' Cup Juvenile Turf	Airoforce	2nd
October	Spinster Stakes	Keeneland	Kentucky	Breeders' Cup Distaff	Got Lucky	entered
October	Jessamine Stakes	Keeneland	Kentucky	Breeders' Cup Juvenile Fillies Turf	Harmonize	entered
