= 2014 Breeders' Cup Challenge series =

Series of horse races

The 2014 Breeders' Cup Challenge series provided winners of the designated races an automatic "Win and You're In" Berth in the 2014 Breeders' Cup. Races were chosen by the Breeders' Cup organization and included key prep races in the various Breeders' Cup divisions from around the world.

For 2014, seven new races were added to the series: the Paddock Stakes, Queen Elizabeth Stakes, Grande Premio Brasil, Clasico Cesar del Rio, Copa De Oro Vinas De Chile, The Gold Cup at Santa Anita, Haskell Invitational, Belmont Oaks, Matron Stakes, Juddmonte International and Rockfel Stakes. NBC broadcast 18 of the races.

For 2014, thirty-seven horses entered in the Breeders' Cup races qualified via the challenge series, including four of the winners. These were:

- Bayern, who qualified for the Classic by winning the Haskell Invitational
- Main Sequence, who won the Joe Hirsch Turf Classic to qualify for the Turf
- Work All Week, who earned his berth in the Sprint by winning the Phoenix Stakes
- Goldencents, who won the Pat O'Brien Handicap to qualify for the Dirt Mile

The 2014 Breeders' Cup races were missing several prominent horses due to injury or illness. Most notably, American Pharoah, favored in the Juvenile after winning the FrontRunner Stakes, missed the race due to a bruise to the left front hoof. Similarly, Wise Dan, two-time winner of the Mile, qualified for the third time by winning the Shadwell Turf Mile but suffered a non-displaced fracture in his right foreleg. Beholder qualified in the Zenyatta but came down with an illness and missed the chance to defend her Distaff championship. Bal a Bali qualified for the Turf in the Gran Premio Brazil but developed laminitis and missed the race.

The winners of the 2014 Breeders' Cup Challenge series races are shown below. The last column shows whether the horse was subsequently entered in the Breeders' Cup, and if so, whether they achieved a top three finish. The 2014 Breeders' Cup Challenge races included:

Month	Race	Track	Location	Division	Winner	BC Result
January	Paddock Stakes	Kenilworth	South Africa	Breeders' Cup Filly & Mare Turf	Beach Beauty	not entered
January	Queen's Plate	Kenilworth	South Africa	Breeders' Cup Mile	Cape Town Noir	entered
April	Doncaster Mile	Randwick	Australia	Breeders' Cup Mile	Sacred Falls	entered
April	TJ Smith Stakes	Randwick	Australia	Breeders' Cup Turf Sprint	Lankan Rupee	not entered
April	Queen Elizabeth Stakes	Randwick	Australia	Breeders' Cup Turf	It's A Dundeel	not entered
May	Gran Premio 25 de Mayo	San Isidro	Argentina	Breeders' Cup Turf	Sir Winsalot	not entered
June	Metropolitan Handicap	Belmont Park	New York	Breeders' Cup Dirt Mile	Palace Malice	not entered
June	Ogden Phipps Stakes	Belmont Park	New York	Breeders' Cup Distaff	Close Hatches	entered
June	Grande Prêmio Brasil	Hipódromo da Gávea	Brazil	Breeders' Cup Turf	Bal A Bali	injured
June	Stephen Foster Handicap	Churchill Downs	Kentucky	Breeders' Cup Classic	Moonshine Mullin	not entered
June	Shoemaker Mile	Santa Anita	California	Breeders' Cup Mile	Obviously	entered
June	The Gold Cup at Santa Anita	Santa Anita	California	Breeders' Cup Classic	Majestic Harbor	entered
June	Takarazuka Kinen	Hanshin	Japan	Breeders' Cup Turf	Gold Ship	not entered
July	Belmont Oaks Invitational Stakes	Belmont Park	New York	Breeders' Cup Filly & Mare Turf	Minorette	not entered
July	King George VI and Queen Elizabeth Stakes	Ascot	England	Breeders' Cup Turf	Taghrooda	not entered
July	Clement L. Hirsch Stakes	Del Mar	California	Breeders' Cup Distaff	Iotapa	3rd
July	Bing Crosby Handicap	Del Mar	California	Breeders' Cup Sprint	Big Macher	entered
July	Haskell Invitational	Monmouth	New Jersey	Breeders' Cup Classic	Bayern	1st
August	Whitney Handicap	Saratoga	New York	Breeders' Cup Classic	Moreno	entered
August	Beverly D. Stakes	Arlington	Illinois	Breeders' Cup Filly & Mare Turf	Euro Charline	not entered
August	Arlington Million	Arlington	Illinois	Breeders' Cup Turf	Hardest Core	entered
August	Prix Jacques Le Marois	Deauville	France	Breeders' Cup Mile	Kingman	not entered
August	Juddmonte International	York	England	Breeders' Cup Turf	Australia	not entered
August	Yorkshire Oaks	York	England	Breeders' Cup Filly & Mare Turf	Tapestry	not entered
August	Nunthorpe Stakes	York	England	Breeders' Cup Turf Sprint	Sole Power	not entered
August	Pacific Classic	Del Mar	California	Breeders' Cup Classic	Shared Belief	4th
August	Del Mar Handicap	Del Mar	California	Breeders' Cup Turf	Big John B	entered
August	Pat O'Brien Handicap	Del Mar	California	Breeders' Cup Dirt Mile	Goldencents	1st
August	Personal Ensign Stakes	Saratoga	New York	Breeders' Cup Distaff	Close Hatches	entered
August	Ballerina Stakes	Saratoga	New York	Breeders' Cup Filly & Mare Sprint	Artemis Agrotera	entered
August	Forego Stakes	Saratoga	New York	Breeders' Cup Sprint	Palace	entered
September	Grosser Preis von Baden	Baden-Baden	Germany	Breeders' Cup Turf	Ivanhowe	not entered
September	Matron Stakes	Leopardstown	Ireland	Breeders' Cup Filly & Mare Turf	Fiesolana	entered
September	Irish Champion Stakes	Leopardstown	Ireland	Breeders' Cup Turf	The Grey Gatsby	not entered
September	Juvenile Turf Stakes	Leopardstown	Ireland	Breeders' Cup Juvenile Turf	John F. Kennedy	not entered
September	Moyglare Stud Stakes	Curragh	Ireland	Breeders' Cup Juvenile Fillies Turf	Cursory Glance	not entered
September	Pocahontas Stakes	Churchill Downs	Kentucky	Breeders' Cup Juvenile Fillies	Christina's Journey	entered
September	Iroquois Stakes	Churchill Downs	Kentucky	Breeders' Cup Juvenile	Lucky Player	entered
September	Canadian Stakes	Woodbine	Canada	Breeders' Cup Filly & Mare Turf	Deceptive Vision	not entered
September	Woodbine Mile	Woodbine	Canada	Breeders' Cup Mile	Trade Storm	3rd
September	Natalma Stakes	Woodbine	Canada	Breeders' Cup Juvenile Fillies Turf	Conquest Harlanate	entered
September	Summer Stakes	Woodbine	Canada	Breeders' Cup Juvenile Turf	Conquest Typhoon	entered
September	Rockfel Stakes	Newmarket	England	Breeders' Cup Juvenile Fillies Turf	Lucida	not entered
September	Royal Lodge Stakes	Newmarket	England	Breeders' Cup Juvenile Turf	Elm Park	not entered
September	Flower Bowl Invitational Stakes	Belmont Park	New York	Breeders' Cup Filly & Mare Turf	Stephanie's Kitten	2nd
September	Joe Hirsch Turf Classic Invitational Stakes	Belmont Park	New York	Breeders' Cup Turf	Main Sequence	1st
September	Vosburgh Stakes	Belmont Park	New York	Breeders' Cup Sprint	Private Zone	3rd
September	Jockey Club Gold Cup	Belmont Park	New York	Breeders' Cup Classic	Tonalist	entered
September	Awesome Again Stakes	Santa Anita	California	Breeders' Cup Classic	Shared Belief	4th
September	FrontRunner Stakes	Santa Anita	California	Breeders' Cup Juvenile	American Pharoah	injured
September	Chandelier Stakes	Santa Anita	California	Breeders' Cup Juvenile Fillies	Angela Renee	entered
September	Rodeo Drive Stakes	Santa Anita	California	Breeders' Cup Filly & Mare Turf	Emollient	entered
September	Zenyatta Stakes	Santa Anita	California	Breeders' Cup Distaff	Beholder	illness
October	Prix de l'Opéra	Longchamp	France	Breeders' Cup Filly & Mare Turf	Winner We Are	not entered
October	Prix Jean-Luc Lagardère	Longchamp	France	Breeders' Cup Juvenile Turf	Full Mast	not entered
October	Prix Marcel Boussac	Longchamp	France	Breeders' Cup Juvenile Fillies Turf	Found	not entered
October	Alcibiades Stakes	Keeneland	Kentucky	Breeders' Cup Juvenile Fillies	Peace and War	not entered
October	Phoenix Stakes	Keeneland	Kentucky	Breeders' Cup Sprint	Work All Week	1st
October	Champagne Stakes	Belmont Park	New York	Breeders' Cup Juvenile	Daredevil	entered
October	Frizette Stakes	Belmont Park	New York	Breeders' Cup Juvenile Fillies	By The Moon	entered
October	Shadwell Turf Mile Stakes	Keeneland	Kentucky	Breeders' Cup Mile	Wise Dan	injured
October	Breeders' Futurity Stakes	Keeneland	Kentucky	Breeders' Cup Juvenile	Carpe Diem	2nd
October	Thoroughbred Club of America Stakes	Keeneland	Kentucky	Breeders' Cup Filly & Mare Sprint	Leigh Court	entered
October	Santa Anita Sprint Championship	Santa Anita	California	Breeders' Cup Sprint	Rich Tapestry	entered
October	Bourbon Stakes	Keeneland	Kentucky	Breeders' Cup Juvenile Turf	Lawn Ranger	entered
October	Spinster Stakes	Keeneland	Kentucky	Breeders' Cup Distaff	Don't Tell Sophia	2nd
October	Jessamine Stakes	Keeneland	Kentucky	Breeders' Cup Juvenile Fillies Turf	Rainha Da Bateria	entered
