= Grande Prêmio Cruzeiro do Sul =

Brazilian horse race

- Class: Group 1
- Inaugurated: 1883
- Race type: Flat / Thoroughbred

Race information
- Distance: 2,400 metres (1.5 mi)
- Surface: Turf
- Track: Hipódromo da Gávea
- Qualification: Three-year-olds

The Grande Prêmio Cruzeiro do Sul, also known as the Brazilian Derby, is a Group 1 flat horse race in Brazil open to three-year-olds run over a distance of 2,400 metres (1.5 mi) at Hipódromo da Gávea every April. It is the third leg of the Rio de Janeiro Triple Crown.

== History ==
The Grande Prêmio Cruzeiro do Sul was first run in 1883 in the spring. The race was not run in 1886 as it moved to an autumn runtime. Aside from 1966, the race has been run every year since then. Since its inception, the race has been run over the same distance of 2400 meters.

In 2020, due to the COVID-19 pandemic, the race was run in June instead of its usual April date.

== Records since 1932 ==
Speed record:

- 2:23.25 – Bal a Bali (2014)

Largest margin of victory (since 2010):

- 6 lengths – Daffy Girl (2016)

Most wins by a jockey:

- 5 – F. Irigoyen (1950, 1951, 1957, 1959, 1961)
- 5 – J. M. Silva (1986, 1988, 1990, 1991, 2000)
- 5 – J. Ricardo (1993, 1998, 2002, 2004, 2007)
- 4 – J. Marchant (1952, 1953, 1956, 1960)
- 4 – Valdinei Gil (2016, 2018, 2020, 2021)

Most wins by a trainer:

- 7 – Dulcino Guignoni (1998, 2001, 2003, 2008, 2013, 2014, 2015)
- 6 – Ernani de Freitas (1935, 1944, 1945, 1947, 1963, 1973)
- 4 – Venâncio Nahid (1990, 2002, 2004, 2022)

Most wins by an owner:

- 17 – Haras São José e Expedictus (1932, 1935, 1937, 1939, 1942, 1944, 1945, 1947, 1963, 1967, 1973, 1979, 1985, 1987, 1998, 2001, 2007)
- 5 – Stud Seabra (1950, 1951, 1957, 1959, 1961)
- 3 – Frederico J. Lundgren (1933, 1934, 1943)
- 3 – Haras Santa Maria de Araras (1984, 1994, 2016)

Most wins by a breeder:

- 17 – Haras São José e Expedictus (1932, 1935, 1937, 1939, 1942, 1944, 1945, 1947, 1963, 1967, 1973, 1979, 1985, 1987, 1998, 2001, 2007)
- 8 – Haras Santa Maria de Araras (1984, 1992, 1994, 1997, 2011, 2014, 2016, 2025)
- 7 – A. J. Peixoto de Castro Jr. (1941, 1949, 1952, 1953, 1956, 1960, 1972)
- 5 – Haras Guanabara (1950, 1951, 1957, 1959, 1961)

== Winners since 1932 ==
Year	Winner	Jockey	Trainer	Owner	Breeder	Time	Margin
2026	Oderich	Altair Domingos	Luis Esteves	Haras Cariri PE / Stud Sampaio	Haras Anderson	2:26.49	Minimum
2025	Nudini	Dylan Silva Machado	Julio Cezar Sampaio	Stud Araré	Haras Santa Maria de Araras	2:36.37	3 1/4 lengths
2024	Underpants	Wesley Cardoso	Ildefonso Coelho de Souza	Haras Doce Vale	Haras Doce Vale	2:24.62	1 3/4 lengths
2023	Raptor's	Henderson Fernandes	Luis Esteves	Haras do Morro	Haras do Morro	2:30.52	4 3/4 lengths
2022	Sugar Daddy	Claudinei Farias	Venâncio Nahid	Haras Doce Vale	Haras Doce Vale	2:28.30	1 3/4 lengths
2021	Olympic Kremlin	Valdinei Gil	Luis Esteves	Stud H & R	Haras Regina	2:25.47	1 3/4 lengths
2020	Abu Dhabi	Valdinei Gil	Ronaldo M. Lima	Haras das Estrelas	Stud Rio Dois Irmãos	2:26.82	3/4 length
2019	Jet Lag	Henderson Fernandes	Valter dos Santos Lopes	Alberto Juarez Tiellet Miorim	Haras Palmerini	2:26.79	1 length
2018	Olympic Hanoi	Valdinei Gil	Roberto Solanes	Haras Regina	Haras Regina	2:30.40	Nose
2017	Emperor Roderic	Leandro Henrique	Ronaldo M. Lima	Haras Anderson	Haras Anderson	2:29.07	1/2 length
2016	Daffy Girl ƒ	Valdinei Gil	Roberto Morgado Neto	Haras Santa Maria de Araras	Haras Santa Maria de Araras	2:25.39	6 lengths
2015	Famous Acteon	Ângelo Márcio Souza	Dulcino Guignoni	Stud H & R	Aluizio Merlin Ribeiro	2:26.06	1 length
2014	Bal a Bali	Vagner Borges	Dulcino Guignoni	Alvaro José Galliez Novis	Haras Santa Maria de Araras	2:23.25	1 length
2013	Mojito	Vagner Borges	Dulcino Guignoni	Stud Double C&C	Fazenda Mondesir	2:35.55	2 lengths
2012	Plenty of Kicks	Jorge A. Ricardo	Júlio Cezar Sampaio	Stud Navajas Win	Stud São Francisco da Sierra	2:24.80	3 lengths
2011	Cisne Branco	Marcos Mazini	Roberto Morgado Neto	Julio Raphael de Aragão Bozano	Haras Santa Maria de Araras	2:26.88	Nose
2010	Lewis	Antônio Correa da Silva	Cosme Morgado Neto	Haras LLC	Haras LLC	2:26.01	Neck
2009	Gibson	D. Duarte	G. Duarte	Stud Estrela Energia	Haras Santa Ana do Rio Grande	2:35.69	
2008	Time For Fun	M. Cardoso	Dulcino Guignoni	Stud Yatasto	Haras São José da Serra	2:30.04	
2007	Ivoire	J. Ricardo	J. F. Reis	Carlos dos Santos	Haras São José e Expedictus	2:23.52	
2006	Heroi do Bafra	V. Nahid	J. Ricardo	Stud TNT	Stud Mega	2:24.33	
2005	Pototó	M. Cardoso	Cosme Morgado Neto	Stud Cajado	Haras São José do Bom Retiro	2:27.7	
2004	License to Run	J. Ricardo	Venâncio Nahid	Gonçalo Borges Torrealba	Haras Bagé do Sul	2:24.7	
2003	Prince di Java	C. Lavor	Dulcino Guignoni	Raúl Baptista Trombini	Haras Curitibano	2:26.8	
2002	Gigli	J. Ricardo	Venâncio Nahid	Robert Frankel	Haras Tributo a Opera	2:27.1	
2001	Coray ƒ	M. Cardoso	Dulcino Guignoni	Rio Claro Tbs., R.D. Hubbard & Constance Sczesny	Haras São José e Expedictus	2:27.1	
2000	Super Power	J. M. Silva	Nelson Marinho	Stud Rio Aventura	Haras Santa Ana do Rio Grande	2:25.9	
1999	Chico Corredor	G. F. Almeida	A Magalhães Filho	Haras Bandeirantes	Haras Bandeirantes	2:26.9	
1998	Vernier	J. Ricardo	Dulcino Guignoni	Aristeu Frenzel Rodrigues	Haras São José e Expedictus	2:25.8	
1997	Fool Around	J. James	Ildefonso C Souza	Stud Coudelaria Araras	Haras Santa Maria de Araras	2:29.3	
1996	Groove	J. Leme	Cosme Morgado Neto	Gilberto L. Koppe	Cass-Ko Associados	2:26.8	
1995	Murano	R. D. L. Santos	A. Oliveira	Haras São F. do Rio de Janeiro/Haras di Cellius	Haras Santa Ana do Rio Grande	2:26.8	
1994	Country Baby ƒ	C. Lavor	Ildefonso C Souza	Haras Santa Maria de Araras	Haras Santa Maria de Araras	2:26 2/5	
1993	Sandpit	J. Ricardo	J. L. Maciel	Sierra Thoroughbreds	Haras São José da Serra	2:27.4	
1992	April Trip	G. F. Almeida	G. F. Santos	Stud Atlantico Norte	Haras Santa Maria de Araras	2:25.0	
1991	Implausible	J. M. Silva	M. D. Ribeiro	Paulo Sergio Ribeiro	Fazenda Mondesir	2:24 3/5	
1990	Flying Finn	J. M. Silva	Venâncio Nahid	Marco Andre Pelajo	Haras Nacional	2:25 4/5	
1989	Meu Gaúcho	A. Barroso	A. Cabreira	Haras Rosa do Sul	Haras Rosa do Sul	2:27 4/5	
1988	Old Pretender	J. M. Silva	J. A. Limeira	Haras Nacional	Haras Nacional	2:30 2/5	
1987	Itajara	J. F. Reis	F. Saraiva	Haras São José e Expedictus	Haras São José e Expedictus	2:27 3/5	
1986	Grimaldi	J. M. Silva	J. B. Nogueira	Delmar Biazoli Martins	Haras Morumbi	2:31	
1985	Grison	G. F. Almeida	F. Saraiva	Haras São José e Expedictus	Haras São José e Expedictus	2:26 2/5	
1984	Old Master	F. Pereira Jr.	Wilson P. Lavor	Haras Santa Maria de Araras	Haras Santa Maria de Araras	2:26	
1983	Kigrandi	J. Garcia	D. Garcia	Stud Tevere	Haras Malurica	2:35	
1982	El Santrém	J. Machado	O. M. Fernandes	Stud Biscal	Fernando Rebes Velo	2:26	
1981	Denee	A. Oliveira	A. S. Ventura	Stud Montecatini	Haras São Luiz	2:28 2/5	
1980	Dark Brown	J. Queiroz	A. Cabreira	Matias Machline	Haras Rosa do Sul	2:28	
1979	African Boy	E. Ferreira	F. Saraiva	Haras São José e Expedictus	Haras São José e Expedictus	2:35 2/5	
1978	Earp	E. LeMener Jr.	A. P. Silva	Stud Celta	Fazenda e Haras Castelo	2:29 1/5	
1977	Agente	R. Penachio	Oscar Ulloa	Haras João Jabour	Haras São Luiz	2:29 2/5	
1976	Fitz Emilius	A. Barroso	A. S. Ventura	Roberto Gabizo de Faria & Francisco Pinto	Haras Rio Mogi	2:36	
1975	Arnaldo	J .Fagundes	F. Sobreiro	Wladimir Neves Machado	Agro Pastoril Tibagi Ltda.	2:36 2/5	
1974	Revolution	J. Pinto	A. Paim Jr.	Coudelaria Resgate	Ladir Pedro Cherubini	2:31	
1973	Orpheus	P. Alves	Ernani de Freitas	Haras São José e Expedictus	Haras São José e Expedictus	2:27 3/5	
1972	Macar	E. LeMener Jr.	M. Souza	Zélia G. Peixoto de Castro	A. J. Peixoto de Castro Jr.	2:27 3/5	
1971	Rhône	A. Ricardo	P. Nickel	Haras Jahu e Rio das Pedras	Haras Jahu e Rio das Pedras	2:28 3/5	
1970	Elamiur ƒ	C. Dutra	J. J. Gonzalez	José Paulino Nogueira	José Paulino Nogueira	2:27	
1969	El Trovador	P. Alves	Z. D. Guedes		Breno Caldas	2:30	
1968	Sabinus	A. Ricardo	M. Gil	Júlio Capua	Júlio Capua	2:33 1/5	
1967	Gomil	J. Machado	A. Molina		Haras São José e Expedictus	2:31 1/5	
1966	Race not run						
1965	Nageur	A. Machado	A. Rostworowisk	Bãrao e Baronesa Leithner	Bãrao e Baronesa Leithner	2:29 4/5	
1964	Predominio	A. Ricardo	C. Gomes	Antonio Pereira Dias	Haras do Arado	2:30 2/5	
1963	Devon	M. Silva	Ernani de Freitas	Haras São José e Expedictus	Haras São José e Expedictus	2:36 1/5	
1962	Leque	D. Garcia	Sabatino D'Amore	Teotonio Piza de Lara	Fazenda Nova	2:36 2/5	
1961	Emerson	F. Irigoyen	C. Cabral	Stud Seabra	Haras Guanabara	2:32 1/5	
1960	Zuido	J. Marchant	Mario de Almeida	Fazenda Mondesir	A. J. Peixoto de Castro Jr.	2:31 2/5	
1959	Escorial	F. Irigoyen	M. Souza	Stud Seabra	Haras Guanabara	2:26 3/5	
1958	Narvik	L. Rigoni	M. Farrajota	Haras Faxina	Haras Faxina	2:29 3/5	
1957	Canavial	F. Irigoyen	P. Gusso Jr.	Stud Seabra	Haras Guanabara	2:274/5	
1956	Timão	J. Marchant	M. Almeida	Zélia G. Peixoto de Castro	A. J. Peixoto de Castro Jr.	2:34	
1955	Courgeuse ƒ	P. Vaz	P. Gusso Jr.	Stud Verde e Preto	Haras São Bernardo	2:31	
1954	Joiosa ƒ	E. Castilho	J. Morgado	Stud Rocha Faria	Haras Santa Annita	2:29 4/5	
1953	Quiproquó	J. Marchant	Oswaldo Feijó	A. J. Peixoto de Castro Jr.	A. J. Peixoto de Castro Jr.	2:27 2/5	
1952	Platina ƒ	J. Marchant	Oswaldo Feijó	A. J. Peixoto de Castro Jr.	A. J. Peixoto de Castro Jr.	2:28 2/5	
1951	Honolulu	F. Irigoyen	Juan Zuniga	Stud Seabra	Haras Guanabara	2:33	
1950	Martini	F. Irigoyen	Juan Zuniga	Stud Seabra	Haras Guanabara	2:30 4/5	
1949	Manguari	L. Rigoni	C. Pereira	Haras Ipiranga	A. J. Peixoto de Castro Jr.	2:29 4/5	
1948	Hamdam	E. Castilho	C. Gomes	José Paulino Nogueira	Haras Bela Esperança	2:29 1/5	
1947	Helíaco	O. Ulloa	Ernani de Freitas	Haras São José e Expedictus	Haras São José e Expedictus	2:29 1/5	
1946	Bonitão	R. Olguin	M. Farrajota	Haras Faxina	Haras Faxina	2:34	
1945	Fontaine ƒ	E. Castilho	Ernani de Freitas	Haras São José e Expedictus	Haras São José e Expedictus	2:29	
1944	Ever Ready	L. Gonzalez	Ernani de Freitas	Haras São José e Expedictus	Haras São José e Expedictus	2:28 1/5	
1943	Curao	L. Leighton	J. Coutinho	Frederico J. Lundgren	Frederico J. Lundgren	2:30 2/5	
1942	Criolan		C. Gomes	Haras São José e Expedictus	Haras São José e Expedictus	2:29	
1941	Talvez!	L. Benitez	Oswaldo Feijó	Jayme Moniz Aragão	A. J. Peixoto de Castro Jr.	2:29 1/5	
1940	Jamundá ƒ	W. Cunha	E. Moreira	Servicio de Remonta do Exercito	Servicio de Remonta do Exercito	2:34 3/5	
1939	L'Atlantide ƒ	J. Mesquita	E. Freitas	Haras São José e Expedictus	Haras São José e Expedictus	2:32 3/5	
1938	Que Tal!	W. Andrade	Manoel Branco	Erasmo de Assumpcao	Erasmo de Assumpcao	2:30 4/5	
1937	Funny Boy	L. Gonzalez	Francisco B. de Oliveira	Haras São José e Expedictus	Haras São José e Expedictus	2:23 2/5	
1936	Tomate	P. Vaz	W. Costa	Antenor Lara Campos	Antenor Lara Campos	2:30 1/5	
1935	Tia King ƒ	O. Ulloa	Ernani de Freitas	Haras São José e Expedictus	Haras São José e Expedictus	2:31 4/5	
1934	Serinhaem	I. Souza	J. L. Lourenço	Frederico J. Lundgren	Frederico J. Lundgren	2:31	
1933	Mossoró	J. Mesquita	E. Morgado	Frederico J. Lundgren	Frederico J. Lundgren	2:35 1/5	
1932	Xenon	J. Salfate	G. Roxo	Haras São José e Expedictus	Haras São José e Expedictus	2:34 2/5	

ƒ designates a filly

== Earlier winners ==
- 1883: Mascotte II ƒ
- 1884: Sylvia II ƒ
- 1885: Sybilla ƒ
- 1887: Plutus
- 1888: Cupidon
- 1889: My Boy
- 1890: Hamleto
- 1891: Hercules
- 1892: Hermit
- 1893: Lordlike
- 1894: St. Sylvestre
- 1895: Abaete
- 1896: Mikato
- 1897: Nababo
- 1898: Barytono
- 1899: Helvetia ƒ
- 1900: Ary
- 1901: Zorat
- 1902: Boulevard
- 1903: Carporal
- 1904: Medea ƒ
- 1905: Juca Tigre
- 1906: Aventuriero
- 1907: Sans Pareil
- 1908: Oasis
- 1909: Indiana ƒ
- 1910: Dora ƒ
- 1911: Roxana ƒ
- 1912: Astro
- 1913: Primavera ƒ
- 1914: Goliath
- 1915: Disturbio
- 1916: Buatambo
- 1917: Hurrah
- 1918: Sunrise II
- 1919: Canguieiro
- 1920: Cigano
- 1921: Artu
- 1922: Liette ƒ
- 1923: Nemo
- 1924: Ousada ƒ
- 1925: Tupan
- 1926: Questor
- 1927: Chrysanthemo
- 1928: Santarem
- 1929: Tingua
- 1930: Rudolph Valentino
- 1931: Jequitiba

ƒ designates a filly
