= Bal a Bali =

Brazilian-bred Thoroughbred racehorse

- Sire: Put It Back
- Grandsire: Honour and Glory
- Dam: In My Side
- Damsire: Clackson
- Sex: Stallion
- Foaled: September 22, 2010
- Country: Brazil
- Colour: Bay
- Breeder: Haras Santa Maria de Araras
- Owner: Stud Alvarenga (2013–2014); Fox Hill Farms & Siena Farm (2014–2016); Calumet Farm (2017)
- Trainer: Dulcino Guignoni (2013–2014); Richard Mandella (2014–2017)
- Record: 26: 15-1-4
- Earnings: US$1,258,268

Major wins
- Grande Prêmio Mario de Azevedo Ribeiro (2013); Grande Prêmio Julio Capua (2013); Grande Prêmio Doutor Frontin (2014); Grande Prêmio Brasil (2014); Grande Prêmio Estado do Rio de Janeiro (2014); Grande Prêmio Francisco Eduardo de Paula Machado (2014); Grande Prêmio Cruzeiro do Sul (2014); American Stakes (2015); Frank E. Kilroe Mile (2017); Shoemaker Mile (2017)

Awards
- Brazilian Horse of the Year (2013/2014); Brazilian Champion Three-Year-Old Colt (2013/2014)

Bal a Bali (foaled September 22, 2010) is a Brazilian-bred Thoroughbred racehorse that won the Brazilian Rio de Janeiro Triple Crown in 2014, the twelfth horse to do so. He was named the Brazilian Horse of the Year of 2013/2014, having won all eight starts that year with several track records to his credit.

In July 2014, he was sold to new owners and shipped to America but came down with a life-threatening bout of laminitis. After intensive treatment, he was finally able to return to the race track a year later, with mixed results. Late in 2016, he was sold again, this time to Calumet Farm for use as a breeding stallion. However, his trainer Richard Mandella convinced the owners to keep the horse active for another year and Bal a Bali responded by winning the Frank E. Kilroe Mile and Shoemaker Mile Stakes. He is the second survivor of laminitis to return and win a Grade I race (the first being Lady Eli in the 2016 Flower Bowl), marking significant progress in the treatment of the disease.

== Background ==
Bal a Bali is a dark bay stallion who was bred by Haras Santa Maria de Araras, which is owned by Brazilian banker Julio Bozano. Bal a Bali is sired by Put It Back, a stakes winning son of Honour and Glory. Put It Back became a leading sire in Florida and also has sired multiple winners in Brazil where Bozano had arranged for him to stand during the southern hemisphere's breeding season. As a descendant of the relatively rare In Reality sire line that traces back through Man o' War to the Godolphin Arabian, Put It Back is an outcross for most mares. Bal a Bali is out of the stakes-winning mare In My Side, who was bought by Bozano at a dispersal sale in Brazil.

The resulting foal, named Bal a Bali by Bozano's wife, was a well-built colt who was calm and easy to handle. He was sold as a yearling to Alvaro Novis, a successful Brazilian businessman. He was originally trained by Dulcino Guignoni, who had previously trained Brazilian Triple Crown winners Virginie (1998) and Be Fair (2000).

== Racing career ==
At age two, Bal a Bali won three of four races, all held at the Hipódromo da Gávea in Rio de Janeiro. He won his debut on February 2, 2013, raced at a distance of 1000m (about 5 furlongs), by 8 1/2 lengths. He followed up with wins in the Classico Jose Calmon on March 2 and the Group III Grande Prêmio Mario de Azevedo Ribeiro on March 31 before suffering his first loss in the Group II Grande Prêmio Conde de Herzberg on May 26.

=== 2013/2014: three-year-old season ===
Bal a Bali started his three-year-old campaign on September 14, 2013, in the Leiloes Jockey Club Brasileiro - Versao Potros, run at a distance of 1600m (about 1 mile), and won by 5 1/2 lengths in a time of 1:33.37 on soft turf. He next won the Ernani De Freitas on October 26 and the Group III Grande Prêmio Julio Capua on December 1. On January 12, he won his first Group I race, the Grande Prêmio Estado do Rio de Janeiro, which is the first leg of the Rio de Janeiro Triple Crown. His time of 1:31.36 for the 1600m was not only a track record, it was also one of the fastest times ever run at the distance.

On February 16, Bal a Bali returned to win the second leg of the Triple Crown, the Grande Prêmio Francisco Eduardo de Paula Machado, in a time of 1:59.25 for the distance of 2,000m. He then completed the Triple Crown by winning the Grande Prêmio Cruzeiro do Sul on March 16. His time of 2:23.25 for the distance of 2,400m (about 12 furlongs) was a new track record.

Bal a Bali rounded out his three-year-old season with wins in the Group II Grande Prêmio Doutor Frontin on May 11 and the Group I Grande Prêmio Brasil on June 8. The latter victory gave Bal a Bali an automatic berth in the Breeders' Cup Turf as part of the Breeders' Cup Challenge "Win and You're In" series. Bal a Bali was named the Brazilian Champion Three-Year-Old Colt and Horse of the Year of 2013/2014.

=== Laminitis ===
In July 2014, Bal a Bali was sold for $1.5 million to Fox Hill Farm, owned by Rick Porter, and Siena Farm. He was shipped to a quarantine facility in Miami and arrived with a scrape on his hind leg. A veterinarian was called in and detected signs of impending laminitis, a hoof condition that causes serious pain and is a leading cause of death in horses. The horse was quickly moved to Palm Beach Equine Clinic, where early and aggressive action proved to be the key to the horse's survival.

Dr Vernon Dryden of Rood & Riddle Equine Hospital said that Bal a Bali had full-blown laminitis: the coffin bone was displaced and had rotated down and away from the wall of the hoof. Treatments included use of a cold water spa (cryotherapy) and injection of several doses of stem cells into the bone marrow. Bal a Bali developed a large abscess on his foot that Dryden opened and then treated with sterile maggots to prevent sepsis. Bal a Bali also had issues with his kidneys and dorsal colitis that required further care. "He had a gamut of issues and was a pretty sick boy for a while," said Dryden. "He was definitely a lucky guy to get through it."

By September, Bal a Bali had recovered enough to be sent from Miami to Siena Farm in Kentucky. His handlers continued with the spa treatment and were soon able to turn the horse out for brief periods to forage for grass. A vibration plate was also used to help restore circulation in the hoof. Over the next months, his handlers gradually increased the amount of exercise to build up muscle while regrowing the hoof. He was first put on a walker, then had weight added, then finally started light jogging on a nearby training track.

=== 2015 season ===
Bal a Bali finally returned to the racetrack on May 9, 2015, after an absence of nearly 11 months in the Grade III American Stakes at Santa Anita. Racing behind the early pace, Bal a Bali squeezed between horses to find racing room in the stretch, then drew off to win by a length from Talco. "He has worked so good in the mornings, so I was pretty confident," said jockey Flavien Prat. "He just repeated his works today. I wasn't really surprised. He was the champion in Brazil, so he can be the champion here. Why not?"

Bal a Bali made his next start on June 15 in the Grade I Shoemaker Mile, where he was moving well around the turn and looked like a possible winner. However, he flattened in the stretch and finished fifth behind Talco. Mandella subsequently detected a small bone chip in one of his ankles, but the condition was not serious. Bal a Bali returned on August 23 in the Del Mar Handicap, where he finished eighth. On October 30, Mandella entered him in an allowance optional claiming race at Del Mar, and Bal a Bali responded with a 1 3/4-length victory. He completed the year by finishing second to Midnight Storm in the Seabiscuit Handicap.

=== 2016 season ===
Bal a Bali had a disappointing campaign in 2016, going winless in five starts. He finished third in the San Gabriel Stakes on January 2, 2016, third in the Frank E. Kilroe Mile on March 12 and third again in the San Francisco Mile on April 30. On May 29, he finished fourth in the Charles Whittingham Stakes and then finished eighth in the Gold Cup at Santa Anita on June 25 in his first start on the dirt.

=== 2017 season ===
Bal a Bali was originally scheduled to retire to stud at Calumet Farm in 2017 but Mandella had other ideas. "I gave him some time off, and they thought, if he didn't train well, he could go to stud," Mandella said. "But he's training too good to go to stud." Instead, Bal a Bali was entered in the Group I Frank E. Kilroe Mile on March 11, 2017, where he was the 9-1 longshot in a highly competitive field of six. Bal a Bali raced in the middle of the pack during the early going, then gradually closed ground in the stretch to win by a head over What a View, who had won the 2016 renewal of the race. Bal a Bali became one of the first horses to come back from laminitis and win a Grade I race.

Bal a Bali finished fifth in his next start, the Woodford Reserve Turf Classic on a rain-softened course at Churchill Downs on May 6. On June 3, he returned to win the Shoemaker Mile at Santa Anita with a powerful closing run. "He's had some problems in his life and overcame them," said Mandella. "He's very fortunate to have had two sets of owners that are the best in the business and were willing to do what's right for him, and the results of that are what we saw today."

On August 20, Bal a Bali made what would prove to be his final start in the Del Mar Mile Handicap, finishing sixth. He was next being pointed to the Breeders' Cup Mile but Mandella felt he was not training at a high enough level so the decision was made to retire him. "He's had problems ever since he came here and he's dealt with them and had success – success beyond expectations", said Mandella.

== Race record ==
Date	Age	Distance	Surface	Race	Grade	Track	Odds	Field	Finish	Time	Winning (Losing) margin	Jockey	Ref
Feb 2, 2013	2	1000 m	Turf (Soft)	Prêmio Quicken Girl - 2005	Maiden	Gávea	12.9	7	1st	0:55.44	8 1/2 lengths	A. Paiva	
Mar 2, 2013	2	1300 m	Turf (Soft)	Prêmio Clássico José Calmon	Listed	Gávea	1.2	7	1st	1:17.24	3 1/4 lengths	Vagner Borges	
Mar 31, 2013	2	1400 m	Turf (Heavy)	Grande Prêmio Mario de Azevedo Ribeiro	G3	Gávea	1.8	7	1st	1:27.45	2 lengths	Vagner Borges	
May 26, 2013	2	1500 m	Turf (Heavy)	Grande Prêmio Conde de Herzberg	G2	Gávea	2.8	10	3rd	1:30.62	(6 1/2 lengths)	Vagner Borges	
Sep 14, 2013	3	1600 m	Turf (Soft)	Copa Leilões Jockey Club Brasileiro - Versão Potros	Cond.	Gávea	1.2	8	1st	1:33.37	5 1/2 lengths	Vagner Borges	
Oct 26, 2013	3	1600 m	Turf (Soft)	Clássico Ernani de Freitas	Listed	Gávea	1.0	8	1st	1:33.64	7 1/2 lengths	Jean Pierre	
Dec 1, 2013	3	1600 m	Turf (Heavy)	Grande Prêmio Julio Capua	G3	Gávea	1.0	6	1st	1:38.08	3 1/2 lengths	Vagner Borges	
Jan 12, 2014	3	1600 m	Turf (Firm)	Grande Prêmio Estado do Rio de Janeiro	G1	Gávea	1.3	10	1st	R1:31.36	7 1/2 lengths	Vagner Borges	
Feb 16, 2014	3	2000 m	Turf (Firm)	Grande Prêmio Francisco Eduardo de Paula Machado	G1	Gávea	1.0	8	1st	1:59.25	3 3/4 lengths	Vagner Borges	
Mar 16, 2014	3	2400 m	Turf (Firm)	Grande Prêmio Cruzeiro do Sul	G1	Gávea	1.2	13	1st	R2:23.25	1 length	Vagner Borges	
May 11, 2014	3	2400 m	Turf (Heavy)	Grande Prêmio Doutor Frontin	G2	Gávea	1.0	6	1st	2:29.13	Nose	Vagner Borges	
Jun 8, 2014	3	2400 m	Turf (Soft)	Grande Prêmio Brasil	G1	Gávea	1.5	12	1st	2:27.29	2 1/2 lengths	Vagner Borges	
May 9, 2015	4	1 mile	Turf (Firm)	American Stakes	G3	Santa Anita	1.5	8	1st	1:35.69	1 length	Flavien Prat	
Jun 13, 2015	4	1 mile	Turf (Firm)	Shoemaker Mile Stakes	G1	Santa Anita	1.5	5	5th	1:35.00	(Neck)	Flavien Prat	
Aug 23, 2015	5	1 mile	Turf (Firm)	Del Mar Mile Handicap	G2	Del Mar	1.5	10	5th	1:35.22	(1 3/4 lengths)	Flavien Prat	
Oct 30, 2015	5	1 mile	Turf (Firm)	Allowance Optional Claiming	ALW	Del Mar	0.9	9	1st	1:33.70	1 3/4 lengths	Rafael Bejarano	
Nov 27, 2015	5	1 1/16 miles	Turf (Firm)	Seabiscuit Handicap	G2	Del Mar	2.9	9	2nd	1:42.70	(1 3/4 lengths)	Rafael Bejarano	
Jan 2, 2016	5	1 1/8 miles	Turf (Firm)	San Gabriel Stakes	G2	Santa Anita	4.0	11	3rd	1:46.64	(2 1/4 lengths)	Flavien Prat	
Mar 12, 2016	5	1 mile	Turf (Good)	Frank E. Kilroe Mile Stakes	G1	Santa Anita	2.4	6	3rd	1:35.57	(Nose)	Flavien Prat	
Apr 30, 2016	5	1 mile	Turf (Firm)	San Francisco Mile Stakes	G3	Golden Gate	1.8	13	3rd	1:36.39	(Head)	Flavien Prat	
May 29, 2016	5	1 1/4 miles	Turf (Firm)	Charles Whittingham Stakes	G2	Santa Anita	1.4	10	4th	1:59.48	(1 1/4 lengths)	Flavien Prat	
Jun 25, 2016	5	1 1/4 miles	Dirt (Fast)	Gold Cup at Santa Anita Stakes	G1	Santa Anita	9.5	8	8th	1:59.79	(3 lengths)	Flavien Prat	
Mar 11, 2017	6	1 mile	Turf (Firm)	Frank E. Kilroe Mile Stakes	G1	Santa Anita	9.6	6	1st	1:33.86	Head	Javier Castellano	
May 6, 2017	6	1 1/8 miles	Turf (Good)	Turf Classic Stakes	G1	Churchill Downs	4.9	11	5th	1:52.42	(Neck)	Javier Castellano	
Jun 3, 2017	6	1 mile	Turf (Firm)	Shoemaker Mile Stakes	G1	Santa Anita	3.1	7	1st	1:32.22	3/4 lengths	Mike E. Smith	
Aug 20, 2017	7	1 mile	Turf (Firm)	Del Mar Mile Handicap	G2	Del Mar	3.0	6	6th	1:34.06	(2 3/4 lengths)	Mike E. Smith	

== Retirement ==
Bal a Bali was retired to stud at Calumet Farm, where he stood his first season in 2018 for a fee of $15,000. His first foals came of racing age in 2021. That year, he was #16 on the first-crop sire list in the United States. He was ranked 19th as a second-crop sire in 2022.

As of 2024, Bal a Bali stands at Calumet Farm for an advertised stud fee of $5,000.

== Pedigree ==
Pedigree of Bal a Bali (BRZ), stallion, 2010
Sire Put It Back 1998	Honour and Glory; 1993	Relaunch	In Reality
Sire Put It Back 1998	Honour and Glory; 1993	Relaunch	Foggy Note
Sire Put It Back 1998	Honour and Glory; 1993	Fair to All	Al Nasr (FR)
Sire Put It Back 1998	Honour and Glory; 1993	Fair to All	Gonfalon*
Sire Put It Back 1998	Miss Shoplifter; 1991	Exuberant	What a Pleasure
Sire Put It Back 1998	Miss Shoplifter; 1991	Exuberant	Out in the Cold
Sire Put It Back 1998	Miss Shoplifter; 1991	Articulate Robbery	No Robbery
Sire Put It Back 1998	Miss Shoplifter; 1991	Articulate Robbery	Art Talk
Dam In My Side (BRZ) 1996	Clackson (BRZ); 1976	I Say (GB)	Sayajirao (GB)
Dam In My Side (BRZ) 1996	Clackson (BRZ); 1976	I Say (GB)	Isetta (IRE)
Dam In My Side (BRZ) 1996	Clackson (BRZ); 1976	Quarana (BRZ)	Pharas (FR)
Dam In My Side (BRZ) 1996	Clackson (BRZ); 1976	Quarana (BRZ)	Coaran (BRZ)
Dam In My Side (BRZ) 1996	By My Side; 1990	Ogygian	Damascus
Dam In My Side (BRZ) 1996	By My Side; 1990	Ogygian	Gonfalon*
Dam In My Side (BRZ) 1996	By My Side; 1990	Blint	Nijinsky (CAN)
Dam In My Side (BRZ) 1996	By My Side; 1990	Blint	Table Hands (family: 3)

*Bal a Bali is inbred 4S × 4D to the mare Gonfalon, meaning that she appears fourth generation on the sire side of his pedigree and fourth generation on the dam side of his pedigree.
