= Gran Premio de Potrancas =

G1 horse race in Argentina

- Class: Group 1
- Inaugurated: 1982

Race information
- Distance: 1600 meters
- Surface: Turf
- Track: Hipódromo de San Isidro
- Qualification: Two-year-old fillies
- Weight: 55 kg
- Purse: $71,000,000 ARS (2026); 1st: $35,000,000 ARS

The Gran Premio de Potrancas is a Group 1 thoroughbred horse race run at Hipódromo de San Isidro in Buenos Aires, Argentina, open to two-year-old fillies. It is run over a distance of 1600 metres (0.99 mi) on the turf.

== History ==
The Gran Premio de Potrancas was first run in 1982. By 1988, it was a Group 1 race.

In 2023, the Brazilian filly No Fear became the first foreign horse to win the Gran Premio de Potrancas.

== Records since 1988 ==
Speed record:

- 1:33.34 – Leading the Way (2009)

Greatest winning margin:

- 8 lengths – Juhayna (2013)

Most wins by a jockey:

- 4 – Jorge Valdivieso (1990, 1996, 1998, 2004)
- 4 – Jacinto R. Herrera (1991, 1992, 1993, 2007)
- 3 – Altair Domingos (2012, 2013, 2016)

Most wins by a trainer:

- 3 – Juan Carlos Maldotti (1996, 1999, 2000)
- 3 – Carlos D. Etchechoury (1998, 2001, 2009)
- 3 – Juan Carlos Etchechoury (2004, 2006, 2010)
- 3 – Alfredo F. Gaitán Dassié (2011, 2015, 2023)

Most wins by an owner:

- 4 – Haras Firmamento (1989, 2002, 2003, 2006)
- 4 – Haras Orilla del Monte (1998, 2001, 2009, 2010)
- 4 – Haras La Providencia (2012, 2013, 2016, 2024)

Most wins by a breeder:

- 5 – Haras Firmamento (1989, 2002, 2003, 2005, 2006)
- 4 – Haras Orilla del Monte (1998, 2001, 2009, 2010)
- 4 – Haras La Providencia (2012, 2013, 2016, 2024)
- 3 – Haras La Biznaga (1990, 2004, 2017)
- 3 – Haras La Quebrada (1991, 1992, 1993)
- 3 – Haras Santa Maria de Araras (2014, 2018, 2021)

== Winners since 1988 ==
Year	Winner	Jockey	Trainer	Owner	Breeder	Time	Margin	Ref
2026	Gran Gotera	Martín Javier Valle	Martín Domingo	Stud Tinta Roja	Stud Haras Gran Muñeca	1:35.90	1 length	
2025	Charm	Martín Javier Valle	José Cristóbal Blanco	Haras Triple Alliance	Haras Triple Alliance	1:40.29	2 1/2 lengths	
2024	Just Be Happy	Eduardo Ortega Pavón	José Luiz Correa Aranha	Haras La Providencia	Haras La Providencia	1:36.57	1/2 neck	
2023	No Fear	Brian Rodrigo Enrique	Alfredo F. Gaitán Dassié	Stud Haras Rio Dois Irmaos	Stud Haras Rio Dois Irmaos	1:43.46	1 length	
2022	Tan Gritona	Brian Rodrigo Enrique	José Luiz Correa Aranha	Stud Haras Gran Muñeca	Stud Haras Gran Muñeca	1:37.76	Head	
2021	Tropeadora	William Pereyra	Mario Javier Ricciuto	Haras Santa Maria de Araras	Haras Santa Maria de Araras	1:37.12	3 lengths	
2020	Race not run							
2019	Ondina Dubai	Adrián M. Giannetti	José Antonio Lofiego	Stud M. de G.	Haras La Esperanza	1:39.18	2 lengths	
2018	Touch of Pink	F. Fernandes Gonçalves	Luciano J. De La Cal	Stud El Chesco Viejo	Haras Santa Maria de Araras	1:39.68	3 lengths	
2017	Samba Inc	Mario E. Fernández	José Antonio Lofiego	Stud M. de G.	Haras La Biznaga	1:42.84	7 lengths	
2016	Kononkop	Altair Domingos	Pedro Nickel	Haras La Providencia	Haras La Providencia	1:34.73	Neck	
2015	Sweetie Girl	Juan Cruz Villagra	Alfredo F. Gaitán Dassié	Haras Futuro	Haras Futuro	1:34.80	2 lengths	
2014	Safari Miss	Pablo Gustavo Falero	Juan Sebastián Maldotti	Haras Santa Maria de Araras	Haras Santa Maria de Araras	1:40.35	1/2 length	
2013	Juhayna	Altair Domingos	José Martins Alves	Haras La Providencia	Haras La Providencia	1:35.24	8 lengths	
2012	Candy Nevada	Altair Domingos	José Martins Alves	Haras La Providencia	Haras La Providencia	1:40.24	1 1/2 lengths	
2011	Una Cabeza	Jorge Antonio Ricardo	Alfredo F. Gaitán Dassié	Stud TNT	Stud TNT	1:36.40	2 1/2 lengths	
2010	Quick Val	Rodrigo G. Blanco	Juan Carlos Etchechoury	Haras Orilla del Monte	Haras Orilla del Monte	1:42.27	3/4 length	
2009	Leading the Way	Rodrigo G. Blanco	Carlos D. Etchechoury	Haras Orilla del Monte	Haras Orilla del Monte	1:33.43	2 1/2 lengths	
2008	Cagnotte	Jorge Antonio Ricardo	Jorge A. Mayansky Neer	Stud Iceache	Héctor Alejandro del Piano	1:34.31	6 lengths	
2007	Wiskola	Jacinto R. Herrera	Roberto M. Bullrich	Haras Carampangue	Haras Carampangue	1:33.71	1 1/2 lengths	
2006	Miss Twins	Julio César Méndez	Juan Carlos Etchechoury	Haras Firmamento	Haras Firmamento	1:34.36	3/4 length	
2005	Miss Atorranta	José Ricardo Méndez	Eduardo Carlos Tadei	Stud Le Fragole	Haras Firmamento	1:33.76	1/2 length	
2004	Forty Marchanta	Jorge Valdivieso	Juan Carlos Etchechoury	Haras La Biznaga	Haras La Biznaga	1:35.02	2 lengths	
2003	Halo Ola	Edgardo Gramática	Miguel Ángel García	Haras Firmamento	Haras Firmamento	1:33.65	4 lengths	
2002	Miss Terrible	Edgardo Gramática	Miguel Ángel García	Haras Firmamento	Haras Firmamento	1:37.71	1 1/2 lengths	
2001	Ivory Tower	José Ricardo Méndez	Carlos D. Etchechoury	Haras Orilla del Monte	Haras Orilla del Monte	1:33.71	4 lengths	
2000	Paga	Juan Carlos Noriega	Juan Carlos Maldotti	Camelias Mercedinas	Haras Las Camelias	1:37.44	2 lengths	
1999	Early Princess	Pablo Gustavo Falero	Juan Carlos Maldotti	Haras Vacacion	Haras Vacacion	1:37.01	5 lengths	
1998	Instant Winner†	Jorge Valdivieso	Carlos D. Etchechoury	Haras Orilla del Monte	Haras Orilla del Monte	1:36.66	DQ	
1997	Generadora	Horacio E. Karamanos	Antonio Derli Gómez	Stud Madrisil	Haras Los Cesares	1:34.30	1 length	
1996	Dame Type	Jorge Valdivieso	Juan Carlos Maldotti	Haras San José Del Socorro	Haras San José Del Socorro	1:34.17	1/2 neck	
1995	Cubata	José Cornelio Reynoso	Roberto A. Pellegatta	Haras Las Arrobles	Haras Las Arrobles	1:33 3/5	DQ	
1994	Word Star	Juan Carlos Noriega	Eduardo Oscar Ferro	Haras Ojo de Agua	Haras Ojo de Agua	1:36 4/5	2 1/2 lengths	
1993	Southern Filly	Jacinto R. Herrera	Ignacio Correas	Stud Fer-Clas	Haras La Quebrada	1:37		
1992	Orca	Jacinto R. Herrera	Carlos Alberto Zarlengo	Haras La Quebrada	Haras La Quebrada	1:34 2/5	Nose	
1991	Fontemar	Jacinto R. Herrera	Carlos Alberto Zarlengo	Haras La Quebrada	Haras La Quebrada	1:36	1/2 neck	
1990	La Charlatana	Jorge Valdivieso		Haras La Biznaga	Haras La Biznaga	1:35 3/5	1/2 length	
1989	Saldeable	Daniel Jorge Ojeda	Juan Roberto Gutiérrez	Haras Firmamento	Haras Firmamento	1:34 2/5		
1988	Sesig							

†In 1998, Nordak crossed the finish line first, but was disqualified and the win given to Instant Winner

== Earlier winners (incomplete) ==
- 1982: Destination
- 1983: Aguilonia
- 1984: So Glad
- 1985: Lumbalusa
- 1986: Comely
- 1987: Pero Yo Se
