= Haras Santa Maria de Araras =

Thoroughbred racing and breeding operation

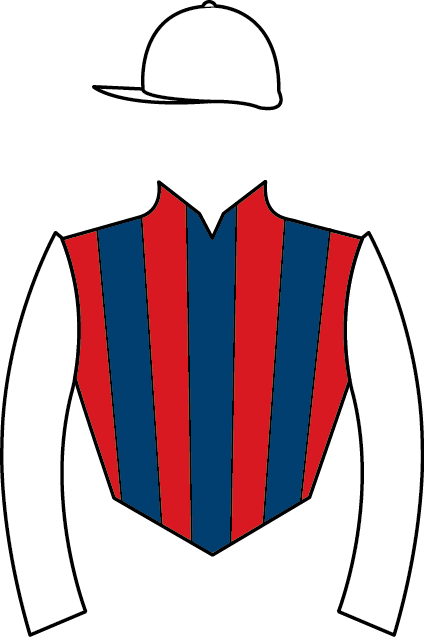
- Racing silks of Haras Santa Maria de Araras
- Company type: Horse breeding farm and Thoroughbred racing stable
- Industry: Thoroughbred horse racing
- Founded: 1965
- Website: https://santamariadeararas.com/

Haras Santa Maria de Araras is a Thoroughbred racehorse breeding and training farm in Brazil. It is one of the most successful breeders of racehorses in Brazilian history.

== History ==
Haras Santa Maria de Araras was founded in 1965 when Julio Raphael de Aragão Bozano purchased land in the town of Araras, in the state of Rio de Janeiro.

The Haras bred its first Group 1 winner in 1972, Freddy Boy, winner of the 1975 Grande Prêmio Taça de Ouro. After the victory, breeding was moved to Teresópolis and the stallion Sabinus, winner of the Grande Prêmio Cruzeiro do Sul, was acquired. A training center was built near the breeding farm at this time.

In 1983, a new installation was established in São José dos Pinhais in the state of Paraná. Another stud was later established in Bagé in the state of Rio Grande do Sul.

In 1984, the Haras began an annual sale in partnership with Haras Fazenda Mondesir.

The Haras first purchased additional property in Argentina in 1976, and today also conducts breeding in Argentina at a property purchased in the 1990s on the former land of Haras Los Robles.

In 2022, the Haras started sponsoring the Rio de Janeiro Triple Crown races at the Hipódromo da Gávea, with the agreement to last until 2024.

== Notable Horses ==
Haras Santa Maria de Araras has bred more than 226 Group race winners in Brazil, and 442 worldwide as of 2023.

=== Stallions ===
Notable stallions that have stood at stud at Haras Santa Maria de Araras include:

- Present the Colors – Notable sire in Brazil
- Put It Back – Champion sire in Brazil 2012/13, 2013/14, 2014/15
- Wild Event – Champion sire in Brazil 2008/2009, 2010/11, 2011/12, 2015/16, 2017/18

=== As a breeder ===
Notable racehorses bred by Haras Santa Maria de Araras include:

- Miss Keat (1979) – 1982 Argentinian Champion Three-Year-Old Filly, winner of the 1982 Gran Premio Selección, Gran Premio Enrique Acebal
- Old Master (1980) – Rio de Janeiro Triple Crown winner, winner of the 1984 Grande Prêmio Estado do Rio de Janeiro, Grande Prêmio Francisco Eduardo de Paula Machado, Grande Prêmio Cruzeiro do Sul, 1985 Gran Premio Latinoamericano
- Pallazzi (1981) – Winner of the 1985 Grande Prêmio Estado do Rio de Janeiro, 1986 and 1987 Grande Prêmio Presidenta da República
- Fain (1982) – Undefeated, 1986 Argentinian Horse of the Year, Champion Stayer, winner of the 1986 Gran Premio Comparacion, Gran Premio República Argentina, Gran Premio de Honor, Gran Premio Carlos Pellegrini
- Troyanos (1985) – Winner of the 1988 Grande Prêmio Derby Paulista, 1989 Grande Prêmio São Paulo and Grande Prêmio Brasil
- Villach King (1987) – Winner of the 1990 Grande Prêmio Linneo de Paula Machado and Grande Prêmio Associação Brasileira dos Criadores de Cavalos de Corrida, 1991 and 1993 Grande Prêmio Brasil
- Above the Sky (1988) – Winner of the 1991 Grande Prêmio Associação Brasileira dos Criadores de Cavalos de Corrida, 1992 Grande Prêmio Estado do Rio de Janeiro, 1994 Grande Prêmio Presidenta da República
- Blue Baby Blue (1993) – Winner of the 1996 Gran Premio Selección, 1997 Carreras de las Estrellas Distaff
- City Banker (2005) – Winner of the 2008 Gran Premio Jockey Club, Carreras de las Estrellas Classic, 2010 Gran Premio Miguel Alfredo Martínez de Hoz
- Savoir Bien (2005) – 2008 Argentinian Champion Two-Year-Old Filly, winner of the 2008 Gran Premio Eliseo Ramírez, Gran Premio Jorge de Atucha, Gran Premio Mil Guineas, Gran Premio Polla de Potrancas
- Bal a Bali (2010) – Rio de Janeiro Triple Crown winner, winner of the 2014 Grande Prêmio Estado do Rio de Janeiro, Grande Prêmio Francisco Eduardo de Paul Machado, Grande Prêmio Cruziero do Sul, Grande Prêmio Brasil, 2017 Frank E. Kilroe Mile, Shoemaker Mile Stakes
- Some in Tieme (2012) – Winner of the 2015 Grande Prêmio Linneo de Paula Machado, 2016 Gran Premio Latinoamericano
- He Runs Away (2013) – 2016 Argentinian Horse of the Year and Champion Three-Year-Old Colt, winner of the 2016 Gran Premio Jockey Club, Gran Premio Nacional
- Village King (2014) – 2021 Argentinian Horse of the Year, Champion Stayer, Champion Older Male, winner of the 2017 Gran Premio Jockey Club, 2021 Gran Premio Miguel Alfredo Martínez de Hoz, Gran Premio 25 de Mayo, Gran Premio Carlos Pellegrini
- In Essence (2017) – 2021/22 Brazilian Horse of the Year, winner of the 2021 and 2022 Grande Prêmio Major Suckow

== Awards ==
Haras Santa Maria de Araras has won many championship titles as both a breeder and an owner in Brazil and Argentina. It was the champion breeder in Brazil from 2006 to 2019.

=== Troféu Mossoró (Brazilian championship) ===
Champion Breeder – 2003/04, 2006/07, 2007/08, 2008/09, 2009/10, 2010/11, 2011/12, 2012/13, 2013/14, 2014/15, 2016/17, 2018/19

Champion Owner – 2011/12

=== Distinciones Pellegrini (Argentinian championship) ===
Champion Owner – 1981, 1983, 1984, 1986, 2008
