= Brazilian Grand Prix (disambiguation) =

Brazilian Grand Prix can refer to:

- Brazilian Grand Prix, a Formula One motor race
- Brazilian motorcycle Grand Prix
- Grande Premio Brasil, a horse race
