= Terrence Lanni =

American casino executive (1943–2011)

- Born: Joseph Terrence Lanni; March 14, 1943; Los Angeles, California, U.S.
- Died: July 15, 2011 (aged 68); Pasadena, California, U.S.
- Education: University of Southern California
- Occupations: Former Chairman of the Board and CEO of MGM Mirage
- Spouse: Debbie
- Children: 2

Joseph Terrence Lanni (March 14, 1943 – July 14, 2011) was an American casino executive. He was the former chairman of the board and former CEO of MGM Mirage.

== Early life ==
Joseph Terrence Lanni was born on March 14, 1943, in Los Angeles, California. He graduated from the University of Southern California with a B.S. degree in business.

== Career ==
Lanni served as Treasurer of Republic Corporation, a New York Stock Exchange-listed conglomerate based in California.

Lanni joined Caesars World in January 1977 as Chief Financial Officer, was named Senior Vice President in April 1978, and was elected Executive Vice President in December 1979. He was a senior executive of Caesars World, Inc. for 18 years, serving as president and Chief Operating Officer and a member of the Board of Directors of that company from April 1981 to February 1995.

Lanni joined MGM Grand, Inc. as president, chief executive officer and Director in 1995. In July 1995 he was named chairman and CEO. In 2000, he oversaw the acquisition of Mirage Resorts by MGM Grand, Inc., which created MGM Mirage.

Lanni served as a member of the board of directors of the Del Mar Thoroughbred Club; the board of trustees of the Ronald Reagan Presidential Foundation; Santa Clara University, and the board of overseers of the Keck School of Medicine at the University of Southern California. Lanni also served as chair of the American Gaming Association. He was appointed by the Speaker of the U.S. House of Representatives in 1997 to serve on the nine-member National Gambling Impact Study Commission.

Lanni received the "Alumnus of the Year Award" from USC Marshall School of Business in 1992. In October 2000 he was inducted into the Gaming Hall of Fame, and in January 2001 was the recipient of Casino Journal's 2001 Lifetime Achievement Award. He received the Sarno Award for Lifetime Achievement in Casino Design from the Global Gaming Expo in 2012.

Lanni resigned as CEO of MGM Mirage on November 30, 2008, after allegations of plagiarism over his degree.

== Personal life and death ==
Lanni had a wife, Debbie and two sons. He died of colorectal cancer on July 14, 2011, at the age of 68.
