= Miss Terrible =

Argentinian-bred thoroughbred racehorse

- Sire: Numerous
- Grandsire: Mr. Prospector
- Dam: Teidi
- Damsire: Farnesio
- Sex: Mare
- Country: Argentina
- Colour: Bay
- Breeder: Haras Firmamento
- Owner: Haras Firmamento; Hammersmith, Carol and Charles
- Trainer: Miguel Ángel Garcia; Robert J. Frankel; Wesley A. Ward; Bradley S. Ross
- Record: 18: 10-3-0
- Earnings: $340,311

Major wins
- Gran Premio Eliseo Ramírez (2002); Gran Premio Jorge de Atucha (2002); Gran Premio de Potrancas (2002); Carreras de las Estrellas Juvenile Fillies (2002); Gran Premio Mil Guineas (2002); Gran Premio Polla de Potrancas (2002); Gran Premio Enrique Acebal (2002); Las Flores Handicap (2005); Comp USA Turf Mile Stakes (2005)

Awards
- Argentine Mare of the Year (2002); Argentine Champion Two-Year-Old Filly (2001); Argentine Champion Three-Year-Old Filly (2002)

Miss Terrible was an Argentinian-bred thoroughbred racehorse best known for winning seven consecutive Group 1 races en route to being named the 2002 Argentine Mare of the Year, Champion Two-Year-Old Filly, and Champion Three-Year-Old Filly.

Turf Diario called Miss Terrible "one of the best two-year-old fillies in the history of the Argentine turf."

== Background ==
Miss Terrible was bred by Haras Firmamento and was foaled on October 1, 1999. Her sire, Numerous, won the Derby Trial Stakes and stood at Hill 'n' Dale and Walnford Stud in the United States and Haras du Quesnay in France before being exported to stand stud solely at Haras Firmamento in Argentina. Her dam, Teidi, had won the listed stakes races Premio Etoile and Premio General Guemes before being retired to stud, where she was exclusively bred to Numerous. Miss Terrible was her third foal.

Miss Terrible was originally slated to be sold rather than raced by Haras Firmamento, but after lightning struck and killed one of the most valuable fillies to be retained, the decision was made to keep Miss Terrible. Head veterinarian Coco Valle recommended her based on the strength of her full sibling Miss Tita's two stakes wins, despite the fact that Miss Terrible herself didn't stand out in any way. The owner of Haras Firmamento, Juan Carlos Bagó, agreed, and she was sent to Hipódromo de San Isidro for training under Miguel Ángel Garcia.

Later trainer Bradley Ross described Miss Terrible as "a high-strung filly" who "needs a lot of attention."

== Racing career ==
=== 2002 ===
Miss Terrible first ran as a two-year-old in a 1000-meter maiden race on the turf at Hipódromo de San Isidro, going off as the 1.85 favorite. She won the race decisively by eight lengths in a time of :54.37. She next ran in the Group 1 Gran Premio Saturnino J. Unzué over 1200 meters on the turf at Hipódromo Argentino de Palermo. She once again started as the favorite, but finished second to Beau Fete by a half length.

On April 13, Miss Terrible ran in the Group 1 Gran Premio Eliseo Ramírez, where she turned the tables on Beau Fete to win by a length and a half. Her time for the 1400 meter distance on the turf was 1:20.36.

Miss Terrible proved her abilities on the dirt when she won the 1500 meter Group 1 Gran Premio Jorge de Atucha by six lengths on May 4. She did so easily, leading the entire way. Jockey Edgardo Gramática said that "She won very easily, without needing to demand too much," although she was nervous leaving the starting gate.

A month later in June, she won the Group 1 Gran Premio de Potrancas over 1600 meters on the turf, despite the challenge of a strong wind. Gramática said that he had to hide from the wind behind Miss Terrible's neck and that she was "calmer than ever". When challenged by another horse, he loosened the reins and never needed to touch the whip, with Miss Terrible turning back a challenge to win by one and a half lengths. Twenty days, Miss Terrible later the Group 1 Carreras de las Estrellas Juvenile Fillies over 1600 meters on the dirt.

Overall, as a two-year-old, Miss Terrible won 5 of 6 starts, including four consecutive Group 1 races, earning her honors as the 2002 Argentine Champion Two-Year-Old Filly.

Miss Terrible's first start as a three-year-old came on August 10, 2002, in the Group 1 Gran Premio Mil Guineas. Going off as the strong favorite at odds of 1.10, Miss Terrible won the 1600-meter turf race by one and a half lengths in a time of 1:34.84.

The Group 1 Gran Premio Polla de Potrancas, first leg of the Argentine Fillies Triple Crown and run over a distance of 1600 meters on the dirt at Hipódromo Argentino de Palermo, was Miss Terrible's next start. Plans for Miss Terrible to head to the United States after the race were discussed. With the withdrawal of Haras La Quebrada's Beauty Halo, the Polla de Potrancas was considered a sure thing for Miss Terrible. Miss Terrible won the race by two and a half lengths, bringing her G1 win streak up to 7, equal to that of Mill Reef.

Although interested in pointing Miss Terrible to the rest of the Triple Crown, owner Juan Carlos Bagó decided to prioritize Miss Terrible's health after her "very agitated campaign, with strong efforts" and pass on the next leg of the Triple Crown and on the Group 1 Gran Premio Selección (Argentine Oaks). Instead, she was entered in the Group 1 Gran Premio Enrique Acebal, run over 2000 meters, 400 meters longer than Miss Terrible had run before. Bagó expressed some concerns over her staying the distance, but the added distance proved to be no challenge to Miss Terrible, as she won by two and a half lengths in a time of 1:58.86.

The win extended Miss Terrible's G1 win streak to 7, tying with that Rock of Gibraltar, and made international headlines.

With her three G1 wins as a three-year-old, Miss Terrible was additionally named the 2002 Argentine Champion Three-Year-Old Filly and Mare of the Year.

At the end of 2002, Miss Terrible was purchased by Charles and Carol Hammersmith to import her to race in the United States. They paid $1.5 million for the filly, who had been recommended to them by eventual trainer Bradley Ross. He had been was impressed by videos of her races in Argentina.

=== 2003 ===
In the United States, Miss Terrible was first sent to Bobby Frankel for training. Miss Terrible's first race for her new owners was on May 26, 2003, in the Grade 1 Gamely Breeders' Cup Handicap. She was anxious at the start, but settled down to set a steady pace before fading in the stretch to finish fourth. After transferring to trainer Wesley Ward's barn, Miss Terrible finished sixth in an August allowance race, once again setting the pace before fading.

The Grade 2 Falls City Handicap was a likely next start, but Miss Terrible was pulled from consideration. She didn't race again that year.

=== 2004-2005 ===
Miss Terrible was entered in the Grade 3 Honey Fox Handicap in January 2004, but ended up not racing at all in 2004.

In June 2004, Miss Terrible's trainer changed to Bradley Ross. He had her knee X-rayed, found a crack, and gave her three months off. Miss Terrible's time off had to be extended after she had a bleeding problem and fungal infection. In total, Miss Terrible ended up having a 19-month long layoff before returning to racing.

In February 2005, Miss Terrible was entered in the Grade 2 Buena Vista Handicap, but was withdrawn in favor of the six furlong Grade 3 Las Flores Handicap. Assigned 116 pounds, she was the second highweight behind Victory U.S.A. at 120 pounds. For the Las Flores Handicap, Miss Terrible was ridden by jockey Alex Solis, who had gotten the mount after running into trainer Bradley Ross in the mall. A week before the race, Miss Terrible had a reaction to a shot and developed hives. In the race, Miss Terrible ran in a stalking position behind the fast pace set by Papa to Kinzie. She came between horses to take the lead in deep stretch and held off Puxa Saco to win by a half-length in a time of 1:09 2/5. The race was the first start for Ross as a trainer since the year 2000.

In May, Miss Terrible was entered in both the ungraded Mamzelle Stakes over 5 furlongs on the turf and the Grade 3 Comp USA Turf Mile Stakes over 1 mile on the turf. Her connections opted for the Comp USA Turf Mile Stakes, which Ross had been pointing her towards all year. Coming from the one post, Miss Terrible, again ridden by Alex Solis, quickly went to the lead and stayed there to win by one length. Solis called her "a very game horse", and Ross said that "she runs like a champion when she takes control."

Miss Terrible's return to Grade 1 company came in the May 30 Breeders' Cup Gamely Handicap, which had been her first race in the United States two years prior. The weekend before the race, Miss Terrible had an upset stomach. Miss Terrible broke slowly, but was soon up to challenge the leader Mea Domina. She remained close to the leader, stalking the pace in second position, before weakening in the final furlong to finish fifth of nine.

Miss Terrible next raced on August 13, in the Grade 1 Beverly D. Stakes over 1 3/16 miles on the turf at Arlington Park. She led for most of the race before tiring in the stretch to finish last.

Less than a month later, Miss Terrible was assigned the top weight of 118 pounds in the Grade 3 Arlington Matron Handicap, run over 1 1/8 miles on the dirt. Miss Terrible pressed the pace set by Indy Groove, but started to lose ground down the backstretch before tiring badly in the stretch to finish last. Jockey Eusebio Razo Jr. said that "She was jumping up and down and throwing her head up in the air, not making up any ground at all."

The Grade 3 Thoroughbred Club of America Stakes, run on October 16 over six furlongs on the dirt at Keeneland, was Miss Terrible's next start. Under jockey David Flores, she broke well and held back in the early part of the race in seventh position before closing in the stretch to edged out by a head by Reunited, finishing second. Flores said that he "got in a little traffic" and that "[t]hat probably cost [him] the win."

=== 2006 ===
Miss Terrible's first race of 2006 was the Grade 1 Santa Monica Handicap, run over 7 furlongs at Santa Anita Park, on January 29. In the stretch, she closed on the inside to finish second to Behaving Badly. Of the race, jockey Garrett Gomez said that "My filly made a nice run. I've got no complaints."

In March, Miss Terrible was entered in the Grade 1 Santa Margarita Handicap, but she was withdrawn and retired.

== Race record ==
Date	Age	Distance	Surface	Race	Grade	Track	Odds	Field	Finish	Time	Winning (Losing) margin	Jockey	Ref
Feb 16, 2002	2	1000 meters	Turf	Premio Gouache 1994	Maiden	Hipódromo de San Isidro	1.75*	12	1	:54.37	1 1/2 lengths	Edgardo Gramática	
Mar 3, 2002	2	1200 meters	Dirt	Gran Premio Saturnino J. Unzué	I	Hipódromo Argentino de Palermo	1.65*	7	2	1:10.96	(1/2 length)	Edgardo Gramática	
Apr 13, 2002	2	1400 meters	Turf	Gran Premio Eliseo Ramírez	I	Hipódromo de San Isidro	1.50*†	5	1	1:20.36	1 1/2 lengths	Edgardo Gramática	
May 4, 2002	2	1500 meters	Dirt	Gran Premio Jorge de Atucha	I	Hipódromo Argentino de Palermo	1.20*	6	1	1:29.75	6 lengths	Edgardo Gramática	
Jun 9, 2002	2	1600 meters	Turf	Gran Premio de Potrancas	I	Hipódromo de San Isidro	1.20*†	9	1	1:37.71	1 1/2 lengths	Edgardo Gramática	
Jun 29, 2002	2	1600 meters	Dirt	Carreras de las Estrellas Juvenile Fillies	I	Hipódromo Argentino de Palermo	1.35*†	10	1	1:37.16	1 length	Edgardo Gramática	
Aug 10, 2002	3	1600 meters	Turf	Gran Premio Mil Guineas	I	Hipódromo de San Isidro	1.10*	5	1	1:34.85	2 1/2 lengths	Edgardo Gramática	
Sep 7, 2002	3	1600 meters	Dirt	Gran Premio Polla de Potrancas	I	Hipódromo Argentino de Palermo	1.45*	9	1	1:35.57	2 1/2 lengths	Edgardo Gramática	
Nov 2, 2002	3	2000 meters	Turf	Gran Premio Enrique Acebal	I	Hipódromo de San Isidro	1.40*	10	1	1:58.86	2 1/2 lengths	Edgardo Gramática	
May 26, 2003	3	1 1/8 miles	Turf	Gamely Breeders' Cup Handicap	I	Hollywood Park	5.10	6	4	1:46.97	(4 lengths)	David Flores	
Aug 3, 2003	4	1 mile	Turf	Allowance	Allowance	Saratoga	0.60*	7	6	1:37.21	(16 3/4 lengths)	Jerry Bailey	
Feb 27, 2005	5	6/8 mile	Dirt	Las Flores Handicap	III	Santa Anita	11.20	8	1	1:09.47	1/2 length	Alex Solis	
May 7, 2005	5	1 mile	Turf	Comp USA Turf Mile Stakes	III	Churchill Downs	5.20	7	1	1:35.89	1 length	Alex Solis	
May 30, 2005	5	1 1/8 miles	Turf	Gamely Breeders' Cup Handicap	I	Hollywood Park	4.10	9	5	1:46.47	(4 lengths)	Mike Smith	
Aug 13, 2005	6	1 3/16 miles	Turf	Beverly D. Stakes	I	Arlington Park	8.70	9	9	1:58.30	(23 1/4 lengths)	Patrick Valenzuela	
Sep 3, 2005	6	1 1/8 miles	Dirt	Arlington Matron Handicap	III	Arlington Park	1.00*	7	7	1:49.87	(18 3/4 lengths)	Eusebio Razo Jr.	
Oct 16, 2005	6	6/8 mile	Dirt	Thoroughbred Club of America Stakes	III	Keeneland	12.50	10	2	1:11.59	(Head)	David Flores	
Jan 29, 2006	6	7/8 mile	Dirt	Santa Monica Handicap	I	Santa Anita	10.80	8	2	1:21.93	(4 1/2 lengths)	Garrett Gomez	

An asterisk after the odds means Miss Terrible was the post time favorite.

† means Miss Terrible was part of a coupled entry.

== Breeding career ==
Miss Terrible has produced five foals, all bred in the United States. Genten, a 2009 colt by Bernardini, is the most successful, finishing second in the ungraded Hyacinth Stakes and third in the Grade 2 Daily Hai Nisai Stakes in Japan. Oh So Terrible, a 2014 filly by Cape Blanco, is stakes-placed, having finished third in the 2019 ungraded One Dreamer Stakes.

Haras Firmamento has tried to buy back Miss Terrible multiple times, but the Hammersmiths have declined to sell her, stating that she's "an incredible mare". Eventually, Haras Firmamento did purchase Miss Terrible's only female offspring, Oh So Terrible, from the Hammersmiths.

Miss Terrible died sometime prior to 2022.

== Pedigree ==
Pedigree of Miss Terrible (ARG), bay mare, foaled October 1, 1999
Sire Numerous (USA) 1991	Mr. Prospector (USA); 1970	Raise a Native (USA)	Native Dancer (USA)
Sire Numerous (USA) 1991	Mr. Prospector (USA); 1970	Raise a Native (USA)	Raise You (USA)
Sire Numerous (USA) 1991	Mr. Prospector (USA); 1970	Gold Digger (USA)	Nashua (USA)
Sire Numerous (USA) 1991	Mr. Prospector (USA); 1970	Gold Digger (USA)	Sequence (USA)
Sire Numerous (USA) 1991	Number (USA); 1979	Nijinsky (CAN)	Northern Dancer (CAN)
Sire Numerous (USA) 1991	Number (USA); 1979	Nijinsky (CAN)	Flaming Page (CAN)
Sire Numerous (USA) 1991	Number (USA); 1979	Special (USA)	Forli (ARG)
Sire Numerous (USA) 1991	Number (USA); 1979	Special (USA)	Thong (USA)
Dam Teidi (ARG) 1990	Farnesio (ARG); 1974	Good Manners (USA)	Nashua (USA)
Dam Teidi (ARG) 1990	Farnesio (ARG); 1974	Good Manners (USA)	Fun House (USA)
Dam Teidi (ARG) 1990	Farnesio (ARG); 1974	La Farnesina (ARG)	Cardanil (FR)
Dam Teidi (ARG) 1990	Farnesio (ARG); 1974	La Farnesina (ARG)	La Dogana (ARG)
Dam Teidi (ARG) 1990	Tell Suit (ARG); 1982	Two Harbors (USA)	Dr. Fager (USA)
Dam Teidi (ARG) 1990	Tell Suit (ARG); 1982	Two Harbors (USA)	Cequillo (USA)
Dam Teidi (ARG) 1990	Tell Suit (ARG); 1982	Tell Tale (GB)	Tamerlane (GB)
Dam Teidi (ARG) 1990	Tell Suit (ARG); 1982	Tell Tale (GB)	All Hail (GB)

Miss Terrible is inbred 4S × 4D to Nashua, meaning Nashua appears in the fourth generation on both the sire and dam's side of the pedigree.

== See also ==
- List of leading Thoroughbred racehorses
