= Gran Premio Diamante =

- Class: Group 1
- Inaugurated: 1980

Race information
- Distance: 1600 meters
- Surface: Turf
- Track: Hipódromo de San Isidro
- Qualification: Three-year-old fillies
- Weight: 56 kilograms
- Purse: $100,000,000 ARS (2026); 1st: $50,000,000 ARS

The Gran Premio Copa Diamante (previously known as the Gran Premio Mil Guineas) is a Group 1 horse race in Argentina run over 1600 meters on the turf at Hipódromo de San Isidro. It is restricted to three-year-old fillies and is based on the British 1000 Guineas Stakes.

It is the first leg of the San Isidro Filly Triple Crown.

== History ==
The Gran Premio Diamante was first run in 1980 as a Group 2 race before being upgraded to a Group 1 race in 1982.

In 2024, the race's name was changed from the Gran Premio Mil Guineas to the Gran Premio Copa Diamante.

== Records since 1988 ==
Speed record:

- 1:32.31 – Nanabush (2024)

Largest margin of victory:

- 9 lengths – Giuliet Seattle (2017)

Most wins by a jockey:

- 3 – Jacinto Rafael Herrera (1992, 1997, 2000)
- 3 – Jorge Valdivieso (1995, 1999, 2006)
- 3 – Juan Carlos Noriega (1996, 2005, 2007)
- 3 – Pablo Gustavo Falero (2003, 2008, 2014)
- 3 – Adrian M. Giannetti (2010, 2012, 2023)

Most wins by a trainer:

- 8 – Carlos D. Etchechoury (1995, 1999, 2001, 2004, 2008, 2015, 2022, 2023)
- 4 – Roberto M. Bullrich (2006, 2011, 2013, 2018)

Most wins by an owner:

- 5 – Haras La Biznaga (2006, 2009, 2011, 2013, 2018)
- 3 – Haras Orilla del Monte (1998, 2001, 2004)
- 3 – Haras Santa Maria de Araras (1999, 2008, 2014)

Most wins by a breeder:

- 5 – Haras La Biznaga (2006, 2009, 2011, 2013, 2018)
- 4 – Haras Santa Maria de Araras (1999, 2008, 2010, 2014)
- 3 – Haras Firmamento (2002, 2005, 2017)

== Winners since 1988 ==
Year	Winner	Jockey	Trainer	Owner	Breeder	Margin	Time	Ref
2026	Indiana Candy	William Pereyra	Juan Franco Saldivia	Stud Crazy Adrian	Haras La Esperanza	1 1/2 lengths	1:35.18	
2025	Race not run							
2024	Nanabush	Martín Javier Valle	Enrique Martín Ferro	Haras Santa Ines	Haras Santa Ines	3 lengths	1:32.31	
2023	Neverwalkalone	Adrian M. Giannetti	Carlos D. Etchechoury	Stud RDI	Stud Rio Dois Irmãos	1 length	1:35.04	
2022	Doña Yerba	William Pereyra	Carlos D. Etchechoury	Haras San Benito	Haras San Benito	3 1/2 lengths	1:35.07	
2021	Polvorada	Wilson Rosario Moreyra	Jorge A. Mayansky Neer	Stud El Brujo y El Tordo	Haras Santa Elena	6 lengths	1:33.30	
2020	Race not run							
2019	Hennie Six	Luciano Emanuel Cabrera	Dario Cesar Periga	Stud Las 3 Semillas	Haras La Pasion	1/2 length	1:37.97	
2018	Joy Nikita	Fabricio Raul Barroso	Roberto M. Bullrich	Haras La Biznaga	Haras La Biznaga	2 lengths	1:43.40	
2017	Giuliet Seattle	Gustavo N. Villalba	Carlos Alberto Bani	Stud Doña Serafina	Haras Firmamento	9 lengths	1:40.70	
2016	Greta G	José Aparecido Da Silva	Filho Pedro Nickel	Haras La Providencia	Haras La Providencia	7 lengths	1:39.13	
2015	Mecha Corta	Rodrigo Gonzalo Blanco	Carlos D. Etchechoury	Stud Chelsea	Eduardo Carlos Luther	1/2 length	1:40.91	
2014	Safari Miss	Pablo Gustavo Falero	Juan Sebastian Maldotti	Haras Santa Maria de Araras	Haras Santa Maria de Araras	1/2 length	1:37.99	
2013	Sociologa Inc	Fabricio Raul Barroso	Roberto M. Bullrich	Haras La Biznaga	Haras La Biznaga	2 lengths	1:33.87	
2012	Empress Jackie	Adrian M. Giannetti	Juan Bautista Udaondo	Haras Santa Ines	Haras Santa Ines	2 1/2 lengths	1:39.85	
2011	Stormy Ninguna	Altair Domingos	Roberto M. Bullrich	Haras La Biznaga	Haras La Biznaga	Head	1:35.41	
2010	Modern Greek	Adrian M. Giannetti	Juan Carlos Etchechoury	Stud El Gusy	Haras Santa Maria de Araras	2 lengths	1:39.20	
2009	Pure Bike	Julio Cesar Mendez	Jorge Valdivieso	Haras La Biznaga	Haras La Biznaga	Nose	1:36.12	
2008	Savoir Bien	Pablo Gustavo Falero	Carlos D. Etchechoury	Haras Santa Maria de Araras	Haras Santa Maria de Araras	3 lengths	1:34.31	
2007	Mama Delia	Juan Carlos Noriega	Juan Sebastian Maldotti	Stud El Matucho	Mateo Laborde	1/2 length	1:33.98	
2006	Stormy Nimble	Jorge Valdivieso	Roberto M. Bullrich	Haras La Biznaga	Haras La Biznaga	Head	1:35.19	
2005	Miss Atorranta	Juan Carlos Noriega	Eduardo Carlos Tadei	Stud Le Fragole	Haras Firmamento	1 1/2 lengths	1:33.76	
2004	Magnetic Eyes	Rodrigo Gonzalo Blanco	Carlos D. Etchechoury	Haras Orilla del Monte	Haras Orilla del Monte	1/2 length	1:34.91	
2003	Salt Champ	Pablo Gustavo Falero	Juan Carlos Maldotti	Stud E.V.G.	Lerena Alvaro Vargas	2 1/2 lengths	1:35.73	
2002	Miss Terrible	Edgardo Gramática	Miguel Angel Garcia	Haras Firmamento	Haras Firmamento	2 1/2 lengths	1:34.85	
2001	Any For Love	Julio Cesar Mendez	Carlos D. Etchechoury	Haras Orilla del Monte	Haras Orilla del Monte	Head	1:34.97	
2000	Guernika	Jacinto Rafael Herrera	Nicolas Adrian Yalet	Haras La Quebrada	Haras La Quebrada	3/4 length	1:34.74	
1999	Safari Girl	Jorge Valdivieso	Carlos D. Etchechoury	Haras Santa Maria de Araras	Haras Santa Maria de Araras	6 lengths	1:34.01	
1998	Nortak	Miguel Angel Abregu	Juan Javier Etchechoury	Haras Orilla del Monte	Haras Comalal	5 lengths	1:33.33	
1997	Slew Briosa	Jacinto Rafael Herrera	Derli A. Gomez	Stud Mi Bebe	Blanca Yolanda y Pascual Lopez	1 1/2 lengths	1:35.00	
1996	Potrinner	Juan Carlos Noriega	Juan Carlos Bianchi	Stud Tori	Haras La Madrugada	1 1/2 lengths	1:34.30	
1995	Subversion	Jorge Valdivieso	Carlos D. Etchechoury	Haras De La Pomme	Haras De La Pomme	1 1/2 lengths	1:34.19	
1994	Advocator Tina	Juan A. Maciel	José C. Cepdea	Haras El Pretal	Haras El Pretal	2 1/2 lengths	1:35.80	
1993	Fair Desire	Guillermo Enrique Sena	Juan A. Maldotti	Stud La Titina	Haras Income		1:36.40	
1992	Orca	Jacinto Rafael Herrera	Carlos Alberto Zarlengo	Haras La Quebrada	Haras La Quebrada	Head	1:35.80	
1991	Alicaida	Elvio Ramon Bortule		Stud San Jorge	Haras Las Marianas	3/4 length	1:36.00	
1990	Re Toss	Miguel Angel Sarati	Carlos R. Giussi	Haras Don Jacinto	Haras Don Jacinto	1/2 length	1:36.40	
1989	Kapela	Ruben D. Galloso	Hector J. Natalini	Cristian Lisandro (R*)	Victor Hugo Natalini		1:33.60	
1988	Nice Bijou	Luis Alberto Triviño	Derli A. Gomez	Stud Happy End			1:36.60	

== Earlier winners ==
- 1980: Mi Quimera
- 1981: Almira
- 1982: Miss Keat
- 1983: Orchestra
- 1984: May Queen
- 1985: Frau Altiva
- 1986: Fontana
- 1987: Pero Yo Se
