= Gran Premio Enrique Acebal =

Group 1 horse race in Argentina

- Class: Turf
- Location: Hipódromo de San Isidro
- Inaugurated: 1900

Race information
- Distance: 2000 meters
- Surface: Group 1
- Qualification: Three-year-old filies
- Weight: 56 kg
- Purse: $81,750,000 ARS (2025); 1st: $45,000,000 ARS

The Gran Premio Enrique Acebal (previously known as the Premio Enrique Acebal, Premio Etoile, and Premio Islas Malvinas) is a Group 1 thoroughbred horse race run at Hipódromo de San Isidro over a distance of 2000 metres (1.2 mi) on the turf, open to three-year-old fillies.

== History ==
The Gran Premio Enrique Acebal was first run in 1900 under the name of Premio Etoile, a name it retained until 1923. It was run as the Premio Enrique Acebal from 1924–1952 and the Premio Islas Malvinas from 1953–1955. The race was open to fillies and mares three years old and older until the late 1980s, when it was restricted to three-year-old fillies only.

The Gran Premio Enrique Acebal has been run at a variety of distances over the course of its history, including 1800 meters, 2400 meters, 2500 meters, and its current distance of 2000 meters.

When the pattern race system was introduced to Argentina in 1973, the Premio Enrique Acebal was rated a Group 3 race. By 1979, it was rated a Group 1 race, a designation it has retained since.

4 horses won the race two times: Divinidad in 1917 and 1918, Taitú in 1938 and 1939, Platería in 1943 and 1945, and Lumeria in 1972 and 1973.

In 1980, the Gran Premio Enrique Acebal returned to Hipódromo de San Isidro.

== Records since 1988 ==
Speed record:

- 1:57.37 – La Laguna Azul (2011)

Greatest margin of victory:

- 15 lengths – La Laguna Azul (2011)

Most wins by a jockey:

- 6 – Pablo Gustavo Falero (1992, 1995, 1998, 2001, 2005, 2007)
- 4 – Jorge Valdivieso (1993, 1996, 2000, 2003)
- 3 – Eduardo Ortega Pavón (2009, 2018, 2019)
- 3 – Altair Domingos (2012, 2013, 2014)

Most wins by a trainer:

- 5– Juan Carlos Maldotti (1995, 1998, 2001, 2005, 2010)
- 4 – Carlos D. Etchechoury (1993, 1994, 1996, 2007)
- 3 – Roberto M. Bullrich (2000, 2011, 2015)
- 3 – Juan Carlos H. Etchechoury (2003, 2004, 2010, 2013)

Most wins by an owner:

- 5 – Haras Vacación (1994, 1995, 1998, 2001, 2005)
- 4 – Haras Santa Maria de Araras (1993, 1996, 2007, 2010)
- 3 – Haras Firmamento (2002, 2006, 2017)
- 3 – Haras La Providencia (2008, 2012, 2013)

Most wins by a breeder:

- 6 – Haras Vacación (1990, 1994, 1995, 1998, 2001, 2005)
- 4 – Haras Santa Maria de Araras (1993, 1996, 2007, 2010)
- 4 – Haras Firmamento (1999, 2002, 2006, 2017)
- 4 – Haras La Biznaga (2003, 2014, 2015, 2019)
- 4 – Haras La Providencia (2008, 2009, 2012, 2013)

== Winners since 1988 ==
Year	Winner	Jockey	Trainer	Owner	Breeder	Margin	Time	Ref
2025	Doña Vainilla	Brian R. Rodrigo	Juan Manuel Etchechoury	Haras San Benito	Haras San Benito	3/4 length	2:01.51	
2024	Cima de Areco	William Pereyra	Juan Franco Saldivia	Stud Chos Malal	Haras San Lorenzo de Areco	2 lengths	2:00.97	
2023	Edict	Juan Carlos Noriega	Eduardo Gaston Accosano	Haras Triple Alliance	Haras Triple Alliance	2 lengths	2:02.82	
2022	Milagrosa Sureña	Ivan E. Monasterolo	Eduardo José Frontino	Stud Buqui Chala	Eduardo José Frontino	2 lengths	1:58.91	
2021	Didia	William Pereyra	Luciano Rubén Cerutti	Haras La Manija	Haras La Manija	3 lengths	1:58.23	
2020	Bellagamba	Lautaro E. Balmaceda	Enrique Martín Ferro	Stud Trio	Haras Indio Rubio	1 1/2 lengths	2:00.65	
2019	Joy Canela	Eduardo Ortega Pavón	Enrique Martín Ferro	Stud Puey	Haras La Biznaga	6 lengths	1:59.85	
2018	Mirta	Eduardo Ortega Pavón	Nicolas Martin Ferro	Haras Pozo de Luna	Haras Pozo de Luna	1/2 neck	1:59.48	
2017	Halo Holiday	F. Fernandes Gonçalves	Juan Carlos Etchechoury	Haras Firmamento	Haras Firmamento	1/2 neck	1:59.66	
2016	Brandyrun	F. Fernandes Gonçalves	Pablo Ezequiel Sahagian	Stud Masuro	Haras El Paraiso	3/4 length	2:00.91	
2015	Sobradora Inc	Fabricio Raul Barroso	Roberto M. Bullrich	Stud Triunvirato	Haras La Biznaga	3 1/2 lengths	2:01.94	
2014	Boca Inc	Altair Domingos	Juan Carlos Etchechoury	Haras La Biznaga	Haras La Biznaga	Head	2:01.44	
2013	Juhayna	Altair Domingos	Carlos Roberto Giussi	Haras La Providencia	Haras La Providencia	2 1/2 lengths	2:01.94	
2012	Girlie	Altair Domingos	Carlos Roberto Giussi	Haras La Providencia	Haras La Providencia	2 lengths	1:58.31	
2011	La Laguna Azul	Jorge Gustavo Ruiz Diaz	Roberto M. Bullrich	Haras Carampangue	Haras Carampangue	15 lengths	1:57.37	
2010	Tattoum	Juan Carlos Noriega	Juan Carlos Maldotti	Haras Santa Maria de Araras	Haras Santa Maria de Araras	1 length	2:00.67	
2009	Krysia	Eduardo Ortega Pavon	Jorge A. Mayansky Neer	Stonestreet Stables	Haras La Providencia	12 lengths	2:06.49	
2008	Ollagua	Francisco Raúl Corrales	Jose Martins Alves	Haras La Providencia	Haras La Providencia	2 1/2 lengths	1:58.03	
2007	Mia Serenata	Pablo Gustavo Falero	Carlos D. Etchechoury	Haras Santa Maria de Araras	Haras Santa Maria de Araras	3 lengths	2:00.83	
2006	Emotion Parade	Cardenas E. Talaverano	Miguel Ángel García	Haras Firmamento	Haras Firmamento	5 lengths	1:58.75	
2005	Cursora	Pablo Gustavo Falero	Juan Carlos Maldotti	Haras Vacacion	Haras Vacacion	2 lengths	2:00.07	
2004	Verbena Rak	Jesús Alberto Medina	Ignacio Lopez	Haras Caryjuan	Haras Caryjuan	3/4 length	1:59.90	
2003	Forty Paulina	Jorge Valdivieso	Juan Carlos Etchechoury	Haras La Biznaga	Haras La Biznaga	2 lengths	1:59.79	
2002	Miss Terrible	Edgardo Gramática	Miguel Ángel García	Haras Firmamento	Haras Firmamento	2 1/2 lengths	1:58.86	
2001	Terna	Pablo Gustavo Falero	Juan Carlos Maldotti	Haras Vacacion	Haras Vacacion	3 lengths	1:58.92	
2000	Miss Linda	Jorge Valdivieso	Roberto M. Bullrich	Stud Triunvirato	Haras La Quebrada	1 length	2:03.31	
1999	Crazy Ensign	Rubén Emilio Laitán	Juan Carlos Bianchi	Stud El Faruk	Haras Firmamento	2 1/2 lengths	1:59.46	
1998	Delivery	Pablo Gustavo Falero	Juan Carlos Maldotti	Haras Vacacion	Haras Vacacion	1/2 neck	2:00.87	
1997	Victory Stripes	Jacinto R. Herrera	Edgardo Oscar Martucci	Stud Camacho	Haras Abolengo	3 lengths	1:58.77	
1996	Furla	Jorge Valdivieso	Carlos D. Etchechoury	Haras Santa Maria de Araras	Haras Santa Maria de Araras	2 lengths	1:59.77	
1995	Indianita	Pablo Gustavo Falero	Juan Carlos Maldotti	Haras Vacacion	Haras Vacacion	6 lengths	1:58.62	
1994	La Malpensada	Miguel Ángel Abregú	Carlos D. Etchechoury	Haras Vacacion	Haras Vacacion	1/2 neck	2:05.8	
1993	Forever Cindy	Jorge Valdivieso	Carlos D. Etchechoury	Haras Santa Maria de Araras	Haras Santa Maria de Araras	1 1/2 lengths	2:00.6	
1992	Sidelina	Pablo Gustavo Falero	Anibal J. Giovanetti	Haras Caryjuan	Haras Caryjuan		2:04.4	
1991	Fontemar	Jacinto R. Herrera	Carlos Alberto Zarlengo	Haras La Quebrada	Haras La Quebrada	v. m.	1:59.8	
1990	Paseana	Miguel Ángel Sarati	Ever W. Perdomo	Stud Bahia Blanca	Haras Vacacion	4 lengths	1:59.4	
1989	Pulpa	Daniel Jorge Ojeda	Antonio Gomez Derli	Stud Happy End		4 lengths	2:00.0	
1988	Jabalina Brown	Miguel Ángel Abregú		Haras Rosa do Sul	Haras Rosa do Sul		2:00.6	

== Earlier winners (incomplete) ==
- 1900: Parva
- 1901: Zara
- 1902: Partícula
- 1903: Edith
- 1904: Cuba & Magnética*
- 1905: Nebulosa
- 1906: Segura
- 1907: Mentirosa
- 1908: Sibila
- 1909: Casiopea
- 1910: Juvencia
- 1911: Old Wife
- 1912: Hirondelle
- 1913: Piscueta
- 1914: Alsacia & Avicenia*
- 1915: Alsacia
- 1916: La Ñatita
- 1917: Divinidad
- 1918: Divinidad
- 1919: Fanfarrona
- 1920: Democracia
- 1921: Fiducia
- 1922: Black Beauty
- 1923: Teladí
- 1924: Anatema
- 1925: Nota Alegre
- 1926: Villanita
- 1927: La Cloche
- 1928: Fanfurriña
- 1929: Tijeruela
- 1930: La Cuarta
- 1931: Firmeza
- 1932: Fe Ciega
- 1933: Muralla
- 1934: Retorta
- 1935: Marlene
- 1936: Alforja
- 1937: Hulla
- 1938: Taitú
- 1939: Taitú
- 1940: Halte-Lá
- 1941: Miss Viola
- 1942: Xanthis
- 1943: Platería
- 1944: Blackie
- 1945: Platería
- 1946: Michunga
- 1947: Bullanguera
- 1948: Eneide
- 1949: Empeñosa
- 1950: Bambuca
- 1951: La Vestal
- 1952: Virkate
- 1953: Satánica
- 1954: Et Bien!
- 1955: Elite
- 1956: Rama Caída
- 1957: Piazza
- 1958: Vía Apia
- 1959: La Rubia
- 1960: Cocasse
- 1961: Maxixa & Bétula
- 1962: Dorine
- 1963: Jalousie
- 1964: Venturanza
- 1965: Guirnalda
- 1966: Eternelle
- 1967: Mamá Rupán
- 1968: Farsalia
- 1969: Aspasia
- 1970: Folktale
- 1971: Habanita
- 1972: Lumeria
- 1973: Lumeria
- 1974: Fazenda
- 1975: Lutecia
- 1979: Love's Hope
- 1980: La Bettina
- 1982: Miss Keat
- 1983: Miss Carlotita
- 1984: So Glad
- 1985: Eterna Fe
- 1986: Peluca
- 1987: Fiara

*In 1904, Cuba and Magnética dead heated for first. In 1914, Alsacia and Aidenia dead heated for first. In 1961, Maxixa and Bétula dead heated for first.
