= Baden Racing Stuten-Preis =

Baden Racing Stuten-Preis raced as T von Zastrow Stutenpreis
- Class: Group 2
- Location: Iffezheim Racecourse; Baden-Baden, Germany
- Race type: Flat / Thoroughbred
- Website: Baden-Baden

Race information
- Distance: 2,400 metres (1m 4f)
- Surface: Turf
- Track: Left-handed
- Qualification: Three-years-old and up fillies and mares
- Weight: 56 kg (3yo); 59½ kg (4yo+)
- Purse: €55,000 (2012); 1st: €32,000

The Baden Racing Stuten-Preis, race as T von Zastrow Stutenpreis is a Group 2 flat horse race in Germany open to thoroughbred fillies and mares aged three years or older. It is run at Baden-Baden over a distance of 2,400 metres (about 1 mile and 4 furlongs), and it is scheduled to take place each year in August or September.

== History ==
The event was formerly staged at Bremen, and it used to be called the Grosser Stutenpreis von Bremen. For a period it held Listed status, and it was promoted to Group 3 level in 2004. The race distance was increased from 2,200 metres to 2,400 metres and promoted to Group 2 level in 2015.

The race was renamed in memory of Walther J. Jacobs (1907–1998), the founder of the successful stud farm Gestüt Fährhof, in 2005. It continued as the Walther J. Jacobs-Stutenpreis until 2010.

The event was transferred to Baden-Baden in 2011. It was initially promoted as the Badener Diana-Revanche, but was subsequently renamed the Stuten-Preis von Baden. It became known as the Baden Racing Stuten-Preis in 2012.

The title "Walther J. Jacobs-Stutenpreis" is currently assigned to a different race, a Listed event at Bremen over 7 furlongs.

== Records ==
Most successful horse:

- no horse has won this race more than once since 1998

Leading jockey (3 wins):

- Bauyrzhan Murzabayev (2020, 2023, 2026)

Leading trainer since 1998 (4 wins):

- Peter Schiergen (2005, 2017, 2025, 2026)

== Winners since 1998 ==
Year	Winner	Age	Jockey	Trainer	Time
1998	Intuition	3	Neil Grant	Hans Blume	2:21.10
1999	Wellanca	3	L. Hammer-Hansen	Hans Blume	2:26.00
2000	Moonlady	3	Kevin Woodburn	Harro Remmert	2:23.70
2001	Nicara	4	Andreas Helfenbein	Horst Steinmetz	2:22.22
2002	Uriah	3	Waldemar Hickst	Harro Remmert	2:20.78
2003	Royal Fantasy	3	Eduardo Pedroza	Horst Steinmetz	2:26.35
2004	Vallera	3	Ian Ferguson	Uwe Ostmann	2:21.88
2005	North Queen	3	William Mongil	Peter Schiergen	2:20.18
2006	Wurfscheibe	4	Torsten Mundry	Peter Rau	2:23.15
2007	Majounes Song	3	Jean-Pierre Guillambert	Mark Johnston	2:22.90
2008	Ashantee	3	Daniele Porcu	Miroslav Rulec	2:22.04
2009	Lady Jane Digby	4	Greg Fairley	Mark Johnston	2:19.14
2010	Ovambo Queen ^{[a]}	3	Henk Grewe	Dr Andreas Bolte	2:18.52
2011	February Sun	3	Ioritz Mendizabal	Jean-Claude Rouget	2:21.27
2012	Pagera	4	Fabrice Veron	Henri-Alex Pantall	2:24.35
2013	Adoya	3	F Lefebvre	Andreas Lowe	2:21.64
2014	Lacy	3	Adrie de Vries	Waldemar Hickst	2:27.53
2015	Shivajia	3	Daniele Porcu	U Stech	2:32.83
2016	Parvaneh	3	Anthony Crastus	Waldemar Hickst	2:32.20
2017	Ashiana	3	Andrasch Starke	Peter Schiergen	2:35.11
2018	Sky Full of Stars	4	Marc Lerner	Henk Grewe	2:33.43
2019	Amorella	4	Martin Seidl	Markus Klug	2:33.26
2020	Zamrud	3	Bauyrzhan Murzabayev	Sarah Steinberg	2:31.98
2021	Waldbiene	3	Alexander Pietsch	Waldemar Hickst	2:31.62
2022	Amazing Grace	4	Olivier Peslier	Waldemar Hickst	2:36.11
2023	Darkaniya	4	Bauyrzhan Murzabayev	Francis-Henri Graffard	2:37.86
2024	Tiffany	4	Luke Morris	Sir Mark Prescott	2:32.11
2025	Egina	4	Leon Wolff	Peter Schiergen	2:34.85
2026	Santagada	4	Bauyrzhan Murzabayev	Peter Schiergen	2:32.90

^{a} Superstition finished first in 2010, but she was relegated to second place following a stewards' inquiry.

== See also ==
- List of German flat horse races
