= Julio Bozano =

Brazilian banker and businessman

Júlio Rafael de Aragão Bozano
- Born: 1936
- Occupation(s): banker, businessman
- Known for: co-founder of Banco Bozano Simonsen, owner of 11% of Embraer

Júlio Rafael de Aragão Bozano (born 1936) is a Brazilian banker and businessman.

He made his wealth (estimated at $1.7 billion in 2008) in the finance and banking industries as the co-founder of Banco Bozano Simonsen. In 2000 he sold Banco Bozano Simonsen to Spain's Banco Santander Central Hispano. He currently owns an 11 percent interest in Brazilian jetmaker Embraer which has a value of roughly $825 million. Bozano lives in Greenwich, Connecticut, and has a pied-à-terre in Rio de Janeiro, Brazil.

== Career ==
In 1961, Bozano formed financial services firm Grupo Bozano with Mario Henrique Simonsen. He later co-founded Banco Bozano Simonsen, Rio de Janeiro, Brazil-based investment bank, which was acquired by a Spanish bank Santander in 2000, where Bozano made his major part of fortune. In 1969, he started horse breeding farm, Haras Santa Maria De Araras, in both Brasil and Argentina, through which he reportedly owns about 300 broodmares. In 2014, Bozano Investimentos set up a new private equity fund, which buys shares in companies, of R$ 800 million (or US $309 million) focused on the education sector.
