= Gran Premio 25 de Mayo =

- Class: Group 1
- Inaugurated: 1936

Race information
- Distance: 2400 meters
- Surface: Turf
- Track: Hipódromo de San Isidro
- Qualification: Three-year-olds and up
- Purse: $100,000,000 ARS (2026); 1st: $50,000,000 ARS

The Gran Premio 25 de Mayo (previously Premio San Isidro, Gran Premio San Isidro, Gran Premio Internacional 25 de Mayo) is a Group 1 horse race run at Hipódromo de San Isidro, in Buenos Aires, Argentina.

Since 2012, the winner receives a “Win and You're In” berth into the Breeders' Cup Turf through the international Breeders' Cup Challenge.

== History ==
The Gran Premio 25 de Mayo was inaugurated in 1936 as the Premio San Isidro. It became the Gran Premio San Isidro in 1951 and was renamed the Gran Premio 25 de Mayo in 1959, although it ran as the Gran Premio Internacional 25 de Mayo 1960–1963.

Until 1959, the Gran Premio 25 de Mayo was run at a distance of 3000 meters; this was reduced to its current length of 2500 meters in 1960. From 1951 until its distance reduction, the fastest time run was 3:05 1/5 by Yatasto in 1953.

== Records ==
Speed record since 1989:

- 2:23.57 – Seaborg (1996)

Most wins:

- 3 – Ordak Dan (2013, 2015, 2017)
- 2 – Mangangá (1954, 1955)
- 2 – Arturo A. (1961, 1962)
- 2 – Sea Girl (1997, 1998)

Most wins by a jockey since 1989:

- 4 – Juan Carlos Noriega (2004, 2008, 2011, 2023)
- 3 – Juan José Paulé (1991, 1995, 1996)
- 3 – Pablo Gustavo Falero (1992, 1993, 2001)
- 3 – Jorge Antonio Ricardo (2015, 2016, 2019)

Most wins by a trainer since 1989:

- 5 – Alfredo F. Gaitán Dassie (1991, 1996, 1997, 1998, 2023)
- 4 – Carlos D. Etchechoury (1994, 2016, 2025, 2026)

Most wins by an owner since 1989:

- 3 – Misterio (GGUAY) (2013, 2015, 2017)
- 3 – Rio Claro (SI) (1996, 1997, 1998)

Most wins by a breeder since 1989:

- 3 – Haras Santa Maria de Araras (2010, 2011, 2021)
- 3 – Haras Caryjuan (2013, 2015, 2017)

Greatest winning margin since 1989:

- 12 lengths – Sir Winsalot (2014)

== Winners since 1989 ==
Winners of Gran Premio 25 de Mayo
Year	Winner	Age	Jockey	Trainer	Owner	Breeder	Margin	Time	Ref
2026	Magnum Fifth	4	Adrian M. Giannetti	Carlos D. Etchechoury	Stud La Raya	Haras Santa Maria de Araras	1 1/2 lengths	2:28.30	
2025	Honest Boy	3	Eduardo Ortega Pavón	Carlos D. Etchechoury	Haras El Angel De Venecia	Haras Santa Maria de Araras	1 1/2 lengths	2:33.44	
2024	Full Keid	3	Brian Rodrigo Enrique	Diego Peña	Stud Haras Gran Muñeca	Stud Haras Gran Muñeca	1/2 neck	2:28.86	
2023	Menino do Rio	3	Juan Carlos Noriega	Alfredo F. Gaitán Dassié	Stud RDI (SI)	Haras Rio Dois Irmaos S.R.L.	2 1/2 lengths	2:37.59	
2022	Durazzo	3	Gustavo Emiliano Calvente	Ruben Alejandro Quiroga	Marias del Sur	Marias del Sur	5 lengths	2:30.17	
2021	Village King	6	Adrian Maximiliano Giannetti	Juan Manuel Etchechoury	Haras El Angel de Venecia (SFE)	Haras Santa Maria de Araras	1/2 neck	2:30.27	
2020	Race not run								
2019	Glorious Moment	3	Jorge Antonio Ricardo	Juan Manuel Etchechoury	Haras Las Monjitas	Haras El Gusy	1 1/2 lengths	2:35.61	
2018	La Extraña Dama ƒ	4	Eduardo Ortega Pavón	José Cristoba Blanco	Haras de La Pomme	Haras de La Pomme	4 lengths	2:31.34	
2017	Ordak Dan	8	Eduardo Ortega Pavón	Juan Carlos H. Etchechoury	Misterio (GGUAY)	Haras Caryjuan	3 lengths	2:38.64	
2016	Don Inc	3	Jorge Antonio Ricardo	Carlos D. Etchechoury	Haras Las Monjitas	Haras La Biznaga	6 lengths	2:27.45	
2015	Ordak Dan	6	Jorge Antonio Ricardo	Juan Carlos H. Etchechoury	Misterio (GGUAY)	Haras Caryjuan	1 1/2 lengths	2:27.14	
2014	Sir Winsalot	3	Altair Domingos	José Luis Palacios	Mirko	Don Yeye	12 lengths	2:32.36	
2013	Ordak Dan	4	Pablo Damián Carrizo	Carlos A. Carabajal	Misterio (GGUAY)	Haras Caryjuan	3/4 length	2:29.34	
2012	Al Qasr	4	Crisostomo Carlos Trujillo	Juan Suarez Villarroel	Soribel	Kathryn S. West	2 lengths	2:34.51	
2011	Vitaminado	3	Juan Carlos Noriega	Juan Sebastian Maldotti	Haras Santa Maria de Araras	Haras Santa Maria de Araras	1/2 neck	2:33.25	
2010	Fuego e Hierro	3	Edwin Rafael Talaverano Cardenas	Conrado Antonio Linares	Alfa (LP)	Haras Santa Maria de Araras	2 lengths	2:35.60	
2009	Escamonda	3	Edwin Rafael Talaverano Cardenas	Miguel Ángel García	Rogo (LP)	Haras Viejo Tombo	Head	2:26.00	
2008	Body Soguero	3	Juan Carlos Noriega	Federico Martucci	Fejiparma	Haras Chimpay	6 lengths	2:24.35	
2007	Coquelize	5	Mario Luis Leyes	Marcelo S. Sueldo	Los Luises	Haras Abolengo	1/2 neck	2:24.35	
2006	Flag's Boy	5	Mario Luis Leyes	Oscar R. Mansilla	La Reina Mora (LP)	Juan Carlos Bonelli	3 lengths	2:25.99	
2005	El Lunicornio	4	Jacinto Rafael Herrera	G. Frenkel Santillán	Haras Santa Paula	Haras El Galo	6 lengths	2:24.90	
2004	Jungle Fitz	3	Juan Carlos Noriega	Roberto Pellegatta	Cris-Fer (LP)	Haras Firmamento	1/2 length	2:27.80	
2003	Genereux	3	Julio César Méndez	Alves José Martins	Haras La Providencia	Haras de Camargo José Laudo	2 lengths	2:29.56	
2002	Miss Carry ƒ	3	Edgardo Gramática	Miguel Ángel García	Haras Firmamento	Haras Firmamento	1/2 length	2:29.46	
2001	Campesino	3	Pablo Gustavo Falero	Juan Esteban Bianchi	Caballeriza Starlight (LP)	Haras La Colina	2 1/2 lengths	2:27.86	
2000	Potriwish	3	Horacio E. Karamanos	José Luis Palacios	Nuevo Milenio (SI)	Haras La Madrugada	1 1/2 lengths	2:27.36	
1999	Ixal	3	Daniel Jorge Ojeda	Nahuel Orlandi	Chichin (LP) (SI)	Haras El Paraíso	1 1/2 lengths	2:24.87	
1998	Sea Girl ƒ	6	Rubén Emilio Laitán	Alfredo F. Gaitán Dassié	Rio Claro (SI)	Hill 'N' Dale Farm	1 1/2 lengths	2:29.19	
1997	Sea Girl ƒ	5	Rubén Emilio Laitán	Alfredo F. Gaitán Dassié	Rio Claro (SI)	Hill 'N' Dale Farm	3/4 length	2:25.70	
1996	Seaborg	4	Juan José Paulé	Alfredo F. Gaitán Dassié	Rio Claro (SI)	Haras El Alfalfar	1/2 length	2:23.57	
1995	El Florista	4	Juan José Paulé	Eduardo M. Martínez De Hoz	J.S.A. (SI)	Haras de La Pomme	Nose	2:24.6	
1994	Double Paid	4	Juan A. Maciel	Carlos D. Etchechoury	Haras Vacación	Haras Vacación	3/4 length	2:27.0	
1993	Prince Boy	3	Pablo Gustavo Falero	Juan Carlos Maldotti	San José del Socorro	Jorge Eugenio Tavares	1 1/2 lengths	2:28.0	
1992	Potrillon	3	Pablo Gustavo Falero	Juan Carlos Maldotti	Caballeriza Tori	Haras La Madrugada		2:27.0	
1991	Ski Champ	5	Juan José Paulé	Alfredo F. Gaitán Dassié	Caballeriza EFE-GE (SI)	Fontainebleau Farm, Inc		2:26.6	
1990	Romance Moro	5	Jorge Valdivieso	José Juri	Los Moros	José Juri		2:25.4	
1989	Rial	3	Natalio Domingo Mezzotero	Carlos A. Ferro	Caballeriza E.C.B.	Haras Congreve		2:26.4	
1988	Pranke	3	Oscar Leopoldo Zapata	Juan Alberto Maldotti	Haras La Titina	Haras La Titina	3 lengths		

ƒ Designates a filly or mare

== Earlier winners ==
- 1936: Camerino
- 1937: Okay
- 1938: Taitú ƒ
- 1939: Bon Vin
- 1940: Judea ƒ
- 1941: El Chato
- 1942: Banderín
- 1943: Gaztambide
- 1944: Enojo
- 1945: Cololó
- 1946: Sospiro
- 1947: Bambino
- 1948: Equinox
- 1949: Suspect
- 1950: Eastbury
- 1951: Foxona ƒ
- 1952: Pretexto
- 1953: Yatasto
- 1954: Mangangá
- 1955: Mangangá
- 1956: Montmartre
- 1957: Solito
- 1958: Carlinga ƒ
- 1959: La Rubia ƒ
- 1960: Escorial
- 1961: Arturo A.
- 1962: Arturo A.
- 1963: Dorine ƒ
- 1964: Doretta ƒ
- 1965: Charolais
- 1966: Luciano Diez
- 1967: Gobernado
- 1968: Azincourt
- 1969: Indian Chief
- 1970: Up
- 1971: Borobeta
- 1972: El Virtuoso
- 1973: Redtop
- 1974: Circinus
- 1975: Keats
- 1976: Contraventora
- 1977: Dioico
- 1978: Mister Brea
- 1981: Campero
- 1982: New Dandy
- 1983: Juez de Pan
- 1984: New Dandy
- 1985: Reverente
- 1986: Newmarket
- 1987: Nuevo Poderoso

ƒ indicates a filly/mare
