= Grande Prêmio Brasil =

- Class: Grade I
- Location: Hipódromo da Gávea; Rio de Janeiro, Brazil
- Inaugurated: 1933
- Race type: Thoroughbred, Flat racing

Race information
- Distance: 2,400 meters (approximately 1 1/2 miles; 12 furlongs)
- Surface: Turf
- Track: Left-handed
- Qualification: 3-year-olds and up
- Purse: R$561,000 (2023)

The Grande Prêmio Brasil is a Group 1 stakes race at Hipódromo da Gávea, at the city of Rio de Janeiro. The race is run left-handed on a turf track, for thoroughbreds three-years-old and up (3yo+), and is the main race in the Brazilian racing calendar.

== History ==
The Grand Prêmio Brasil was first run on August 1, 1933, a Sunday. The race brought together the best Brazilian racehorses of the time, the idea of Linneo de Paula Machado, president of the then newly formed Jockey Club Brasileiro.

The first running was won by the Brazilian-bred Mossoró, sired by Kitchner, foaled at the Pernambuco state, and ridden by Justiniano Mesquita.

Six horses have won the race twice: Albatroz (1943, 1944), Helíaco (1947, 1948), Gualicho (1952, 1953), Zenabre (1965, 1966), Villach King (1991, 1993), and George Washington (2019, 2021).

The race was first run at a distance of 3000 meters (approximately 1 7/8 miles or 15 furlongs). Since 1972, it has been run at a distance of 2400 meters (approximately 1 1/2 miles or 12 furlongs).

In 1959, Narvik set a world record for 3000 meters, winning the Grande Prêmio Brasil in a time of 3:02 3/5.

In 1963, the starting tape malfunctioned and did not rise evenly, leaving four horses stuck behind the tape. The starter was unable to stop the race.

In 2023, second place finisher Online was demoted and placed sixteenth following a stewards' inquiry.

=== Timeline ===
- 1933 – First edition is run.
- 1959 – 3000 meter world record set by Narvik.
- 1972 – The distance is changed from 3000 meters to 2400 meters.
- 2014 – Bal a Bali becomes the first three-year-old winner. First edition to be a part of the Breeders' Cup Challenge series.

== Race Day ==
Traditionally ran in the first Sunday of August, its date was changed to June from 2014 on, in order to integrate the race into the calendar of the Breeders' Cup Challenge series, as in 2014 the race began awarding its winner with an automatic berth into the Breeders' Cup Turf.

== Records ==
Speed record:

- 2400 meters (current distance): 2:23.93 – L'Amico Steve (2007)
- 3000 meters: 3:02 3/5 – Narvik (1959)

Most wins:

- 2 – Albatroz (1943, 1944)
- 2 – Helíaco (1947, 1948)
- 2 – Gualicho (1952, 1953)
- 2 – Zenabre (1965, 1966)
- 2 – Villach King (1991, 1993)
- 2 – George Washington (2019, 2021)

Most wins by a jockey:

- 5 – Juvenal Machado da Silva (1979, 1982, 1986, 1987, 1990)
- 3 – Luiz Rigoni (1954, 1970, 1971)
- 3 – Dendico Garcia (1964, 1965, 1966)
- 3 – Carlos Lavor (1989, 1991, 1993)

Most wins by a trainer:

- 7 – Venâncio Nahid (1990, 2005, 2009, 2015, 2016, 2020, 2026)
- 6 – Ernani de Freitas (1939, 1943, 1944, 1947, 1948, 1975)
- 6 – Luis Esteves (2017, 2018, 2019, 2021, 2023, 2025)
- 5 – Dulcino Guignoni (2000, 2001, 2002, 2011, 2014)

Most wins by an owner:

- 7 – Stud Linneo de Paula Machado/Haras São José e Expedictus (1943, 1944, 1947, 1948, 1975, 1979, 1985)
- 4 – Haras Santa Maria de Araras (1989, 1991, 1993, 2013)
- 3 – Antenor Lara Campos (1935, 1937, 1940)
- 3 – Stud Almeida Prado & Assumpção (1952, 1953, 1960)
- 3 – Haras Santa Ana do Rio Grande (1984, 1987, 1992)

Most wins by a breeder:

- 10 – Linneo de Paula Machado/Haras São José e Expedictus (1939, 1943, 1944, 1947, 1948, 1975, 1979, 1985, 2001, 2008)
- 5 – Haras Santa Maria de Araras (1989, 1991, 1993, 2013, 2014)
- 3 – Haras Santa Ana do Rio Grande (1987, 1988, 1992)

== Winners ==
Winners of Grande Prêmio Brasil
Year	Winner	Age	Jockey	Trainer	Owner	Breeder	Distance	Time
2026	Zucca Baby	3	Wesley Cardoso	Venâncio Nahid	Haras Doce Vale	Haras Doce Vale	2400 meters	2:28.96
2025	Sinsel	3	Leandro Henrique	Luis Esteves	Stud Red Rafa	Stud Red Rafa	2400 meters	2:24.40
2024	Obataye	3	João Moreira	Antônio Oldoni	Haras Rio Iguassu	Haras Palmerini	2400 meters	2:29.18
2023	Raptor's	3	João Moreira	Luis Esteves	Haras do Morro	Haras do Morro	2400 meters	2:24.91
2022	Nautilus	3	Ruberlei Viana	Nilson Lima	Stud Valentin & Jarussi	Stud Quintella	2400 meters	2:30.81
2021	George Washington	5	Henderson Fernandes	Luis Esteves	Stud Happy Again	Stud TNT	2400 meters	2:34.47
2020	Pimper's Paradise	5	A. Correia	Venâncio Nahid	Haras Doce Vale	Haras Doce Vale	2400 meters	2:26.64
2019	George Washington	3	Marcelo Gonçalves	Luis Esteves	Stud Happy Again	Stud TNT	2400 meters	2:27.94
2018	Quarteto de Cordas	3	Luan Machado	Luis Esteves	Haras do Morro	Beverly Hills Stud	2400 meters	2:30.76
2017	Voador Magee	3	Ângelo M. Souza	Luis Esteves	Stud Eternamente Rio	Haras Old Friends	2400 meters	2:26.10
2016	My Cherie Amour	3	Wesley Cardoso	Venâncio Nahid	Haras Doce Vale	Haras Doce Vale	2400 meters	2:30.19
2015	Barolo	4	Waldomiro Blandi	Venâncio Nahid	Haras Santa Rita da Serra	Haras Santa Rita da Serra	2400 meters	2:34.48
2014	Bal a Bali	3	Vagner Borges	Dulcino Guignoni	Stud Alvarenga	Haras Santa Maria de Araras	2400 meters	2:27.29
2013	Aerosol	4	Altair Domingos	Júlio C. Sampaio	Haras Santa Maria de Araras	Haras Santa Maria de Araras	2400 meters	2:25.94
2012	Didimo	4	Ângelo M. Souza	Lucas Quintana	Stud Ceprano	Stud Eternamente Rio	2400 meters	2:27.15
2011	Belo Acteon	4	Henderson Fernandes	Dulcino Guignoni	Stud H&R	Aluizio Merlin Ribeiro	2400 meters	2:26.21
2010	Moryba	4	Dalto Duarte	Roberto Solanés	Stud Correas	Haras São José e Expedictus	2400 meters	2:25.33
2009	Jeune-Turc	5	Marcos Mazini	Venâncio Nahid	Stud CED	Haras Fronteira	2400 meters	2:30.84
2008	Top Hat	6	Altair Domingos	João Macedo	Stud JCM	Haras São José da Serra	2400 meters	2:25.67
2007	L'Amico Steve	4	Vagner Leal	Valter S. Lopes	Stud Star Gold	Haras Old Friends S.A.	2400 meters	2:23.93
2006	Dono da Raia	4	Marcelo Gonçalves	Antônio L. Cintra	Stud Mictik	Haras São Quirino	2400 meters	2:27.28
2005	Velodrome	6	Marcelo Almeida	Venâncio Nahid	Haras Dar-El-Salam	Haras Dar-El-Salam	2400 meters	2:26.30
2004	Thignon Boy	4	A. Mota	J. Borges	Haras Valente	Haras Valente	2400 meters	2:26.0
2003	Lord Marcus	6	M. Almeida	J. S. Guerra	Stud Red Black	Haras Anderson	2400 meters	2:25.9
2002	Potri Road	4	M. Cardoso	Dulcino Guignoni	Haras São Francisco	Haras La Madrugada S/A	2400 meters	2:27.3
2001	Queen Desejada †	4	M. Cardoso	Dulcino Guignoni	Stud Alvarenga	Haras São José e Expedictus	2400 meters	2:25.3
2000	Straight Flush	5	L. Duarte	Dulcino Guignoni	Haras São José da Serra	Haras São José da Serra	2400 meters	2:27.0
1999	Aiortrophe	5	Z. Paulielo Jr.	A. F. Barbosa	Haras Malurica	Haras Malurica	2400 meters	2:34.8
1998	Quari Bravo	4	L. Duarte	E. Sampaio	Haras Phillipson	Haras Phillipson	2400 meters	2:26.3
1997	Jimwaki	4	G. Meneses	J. M. Alves	Haras Equília	Haras Equília	2400 meters	2:25.7
1996	Quinze Quilates	4	J. Garcia	R. Carrapito	Stud Rio Preto	Haras 2001	2400 meters	2:30.1
1995	El Sembrador	4	G. Sena	J. L. Palacios	Stud Andrea E	Haras El Paraíso	2400 meters	2:27.9
1994	Much Better	5	Jorge Ricardo	J. L. Maciel	Stud TNT	Haras J. B. Barros	2400 meters	2:26.4
1993	Villach King	6	C. Lavor	I. C. Souza	Haras Santa Maria de Araras	Haras Santa Maria de Araras	2400 meters	2:27.1
1992	Falcon Jet	6	Jorge Ricardo	J. L. Maciel	Haras Santa Ana do Rio Grande	Haras Santa Ana do Rio Grande	2400 meters	2:34.1
1991	Villach King	4	C. Lavor	I. C. Souza	Haras Santa Maria de Araras	Haras Santa Maria de Araras	2400 meters	2:29.1
1990	Flying Finn	4	J. M. Silva	Venâncio Nahid	Stud Numy	Haras Nacional	2400 meters	2:28
1989	Troyanos	4	C. Lavor	W. P. Lavor	Haras Santa Maria de Araras	Haras Santa Maria de Araras	2400 meters	2:30
1988	Carteziano	5	E. Ferreira	J. L. Maciel	José Carlos Fragoso Pires Jr.	Haras Santa Ana do Rio Grande	2400 meters	2:25.1
1987	Bowling	5	J. M. Silva	Alcides Morales	Haras Santa Ana do Rio Grande	Haras Santa Ana do Rio Grande	2400 meters	2:26
1986	Grimaldi	4	J. M. Silva	J. B. Nogueira	Delmar Biazolli Martins	Haras Morumbi	2400 meters	2:28.2
1985	Grison	4	A. Barroso	J. S. Silva	Haras São José e Expedictus	Haras São José e Expedictus	2400 meters	2:30
1984	Anilité †	5	A. Oliveira	Alcides Morales	Haras Santa Ana do Rio Grande	Fazenda Mondesir	2400 meters	2:26
1983	Off The Way †	5	A. Barroso	A. Magalhães	Haras Faxina	Haras Faxina	2400 meters	2:29.2
1982	Gourmet	4	J. M. Silva	J. S. Souza	Haras Ipiranga	Haras Ipiranga	2400 meters	2:28
1981	Campal	4	I. Quintana	P. Nickel	Haras Rio das Pedras	Haras Rio das Pedras	2400 meters	2:26
1980	Big Lark	6	A. Bolino	A. Cabreira	Carmem Thereza Machline	Haras Rosa do Sul	2400 meters	2:30.3
1979	Aporé	4	J. M. Silva	F. Saraiva	Haras São José e Expedictus	Haras São José e Expedictus	2400 meters	2:26.4
1978	Sunset	4	G. F. Almeida	A. Miranda	Fazenda Mondesir	Fazenda Mondesir	2400 meters	2:25.1
1977	Daião	4	E. Ferreira	W. P. Lavor	Haras Serra dos Órgãos	Haras Serra dos Órgãos	2400 meters	2:26
1976	Janus	4	G. F. Almeida	D. Pascoal	Fazenda Mondesir	Haras Ojo de Agua	2400 meters	2:25.1
1975	Orpheus	6	P. Alves	Ernani de Freitas	Haras São José e Expedictus	Haras São José e Expedictus	2400 meters	2:27.1
1974	Moraes Tinto	4	R. Rutti	J. M. Boquim	Caballeriza los Griegos	Haras San Lorenzo de Areco	2400 meters	2:25.2
1973	Fizz †	6	R. Encinas	A. J. Giovanetti	Caballeriza Palermo	Haras Argentino	2400 meters	2:30
1972	Fenomenal	5	J. Pinto	R. Morgado	Paulo Albuquerque de Castro	Haras Santa Anna	2400 meters	2:37
1971	Terminal	4	L. Rigoni	R. Fredes	Stud Don Henrique	Imported by Jockey Club Brasileiro	3000 meters	3:04.8
1970	Viziane	5	L. Rigoni	A. Andretta	Antonio Zen	Haras São Quirino	3000 meters	3:05
1969	Kamén	4	A. Plá	A. J. Giovanetti	Stud La Protelada	Haras Argentino	3000 meters	3:14 3/5
1968	Arsenal	4	O. Domingues	J. R. Lafiere	Stud Domingos Marcela	Haras Argentino	3000 meters	3:09
1967	Duraque	4	A. Ricardo	João Araujo	Stud Gabriel Homsey	Haras São Luiz Gonzaga	3000 meters	3:16 1/5
1966	Zenabre	5	D. Garcia	Sabatino D'Amore	Theotonio Piza de Lara	Stud Brasil	3000 meters	3:12 2/5
1965	Zenabre	4	D. Garcia	Sabatino D'Amore	Theotonio Piza de Lara	Stud Brasil	3000 meters	3:04 3/5
1964	Leigo	5	D. Garcia	Sabatino d'Amore	Paulo Piza de Lara	Haras Fazenda Nova	3000 meters	3:19 4/5
1963	Cencerro	4	H. PIlar	A. Breque	Stud Choapa	Imported by Jockey Club Brasileiro	3000 meters	3:03
1962	Ortile	4	F. Irigoyen	M. Cavalheiro	Stud Eduardo Guilherme	Terra Nova S/A. Agro	3000 meters	3:07 3/5
1961	Arturo A.	4	Irineo Leguisamo	Juan de La Cruz	Stud Miss Lionés	Haras Las Ortigas	3000 meters	3:04 3/5
1960	Farwell	4	L. B. Gonçalves	Castorino Borges	Stud Almeida Prado & Assumpção	Haras Jahu	3000 meters	3:09 3/5
1959	Narvik	5	V. Pinheiro	Manoel Farrajota	Haras Faxina	Haras Faxina	3000 meters	3:02 3/5
1958	Espiche	4	J. O. Tapia	Alfredo S. Castro	Stud Verde e Preto	Imported by Jockey Club Brasileiro	3000 meters	3:04 3/5
1957	Don Varela	4	H. Ponzi	Nicolás Ojeda	Caballeriza Rogelito	Bernardo Moretti	3000 meters	3:05 3/5
1956	Tatán	4	J. P. Artigas	Pedro P. Gonzalez	Stud Los Verros	Haras Los Prados	3000 meters	3:12 2/5
1955	Mangangá	5	B. Castro	Branardo Callejas	Stud Aconcagua	Haras Argentino	3000 meters	3:04
1954	El Aragonés	5	L. Rigoni	O. Ojeda	Stud Piratininga	Luiz O. Barros	3000 meters	3:05
1953	Gualicho	5	O. Rosa	Manoel Branco	Stud Almeida Prado e Assumpção	Haras Don Jose	3000 meters	3:05 1/5
1952	Gualicho	4	O. Rosa	Manoel Branco	Stud Almeida Prado e Assumpção	Haras Don Jose	3000 meters	3:03 3/5
1951	Pontet Canet	4	L. Diaz	Jorge Morgado	C. G. da Rocha Faria	Haras Ojo de Agua	3000 meters	3:11 4/5
1950	Tirolesa †	6	D. Ferreira	Juan Zuniga	Stud Seabra	Haras Argentino	3000 meters	3:12 3/5
1949	Carrasco	4	P. Vaz	Levy Ferreira	Jorge Jabour	Haras Argentino	3000 meters	3:04 3/5
1948	Helíaco	5	O. Ulloa	Ernani de Freitas	Stud Linneo de Paula Machado	Linneo de Paula Machado	3000 meters	3:11 3/5
1947	Helíaco	4	O. Ulloa	Ernani de Freitas	Stud Linneo de Paula Machado	Linneo de Paula Machado	3000 meters	3:13
1946	Mirón	5	P. Vaz	Sylvio Mendes	Stud Bela Esperança	Juan Amoroso	3000 meters	3:09 3/5
1945	Filon	5	Irineo Leguisamo	Gabino Rodriguez	José Buarque de Macedo	Haras Argentino	3000 meters	3:06 4/5
1944	Albatroz	8	L. Gonzalez	Ernani de Freitas	Stud Linneo de Paula Machado	Linneo de Paula Machado	3000 meters	3:05
1943	Albatroz	7	J. Zuniga	Ernani de Freitas	Stud Linneo de Paula Machado	Linneo de Paula Machado	3000 meters	3:06 4/5
1942	Latero	4	R. Freitas	Oswaldo Feijó	J. M. Aragão	Juan Amoroso	3000 meters	3:06
1941	Polux	4	A. Molina	Gonçalino Feijó	Stud Albarran	Juan Amoroso & Juan Pozzi	3000 meters	3:06 3/5
1940	Teruel	4	W. Andrade	Paulo Rosa	Antenor Lara Campos	Suc. Raul Chevallier	3000 meters	3:07
1939	Six Avril	4	J. Zuniga	Ernani de Freitas	F. E. de Paula Machado	Linneo de Paula Machado	3000 meters	3:05
1938	Pendulo	6	G. Costa	Oswaldo Feijó	Paulo Cintra	Imported by Paulo Cintra	3000 meters	3:12
1937	Helium	6	A. Rosa	Paulo Rosa	Antenor Lara Campos	Haras El Pelado	3000 meters	3:04 3/5
1936	Cullingham	5	W. Andrade	Ramon Rojas	M. Costa e E. O. Jardim	Haras Nacional S/A	3000 meters	3:16 1/5
1935	Sargento	4	A. Rosa	Oswaldo Feijó	Antenor Lara Campos	Antenor Lara Campos	3000 meters	3:18 2/5
1934	Misuri	5	O. Ruiz	José S. Riestra	José S. Riestra	Haras Casupá	3000 meters	3:07
1933	Mossoró	4	J. Mesquita	Eulógio Morgado	F. J. Lundgren	F. J. Lundgren	3000 meters	3:09 4/5

† designates a filly or mare

== Bibliography ==
- Revista JCB Jockey Club Brasileiro Nﾟ1348
- TBHeritage : G. P. Brazil
