= Hipódromo da Gávea =

Horse racing track in Rio de Janeiro, Brazil

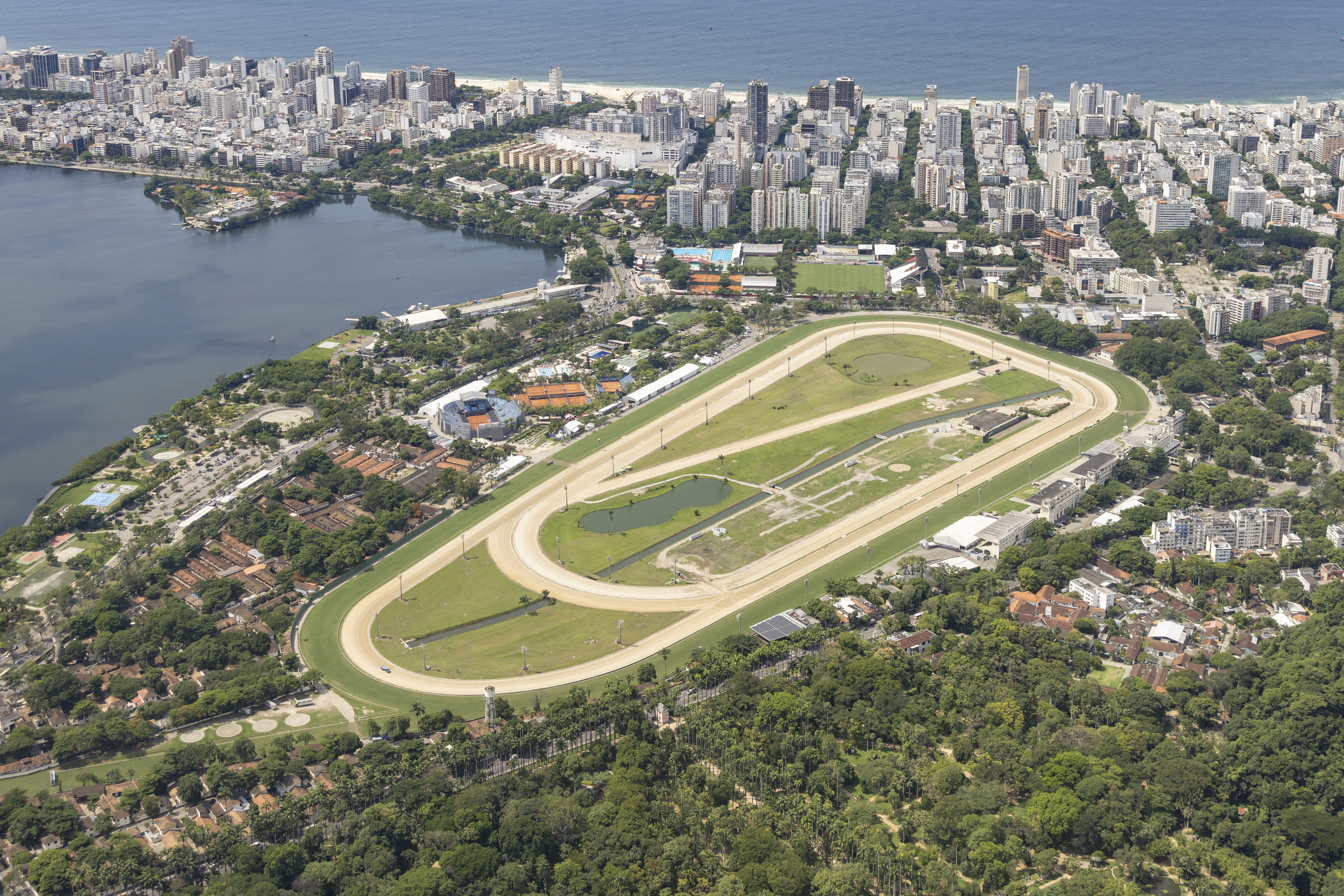
- Interactive map of Hipódromo da Gávea
- Location: Gávea, Rio de Janeiro, Rio de Janeiro, Brazil
- Coordinates: 22.973231°S 43.221921°W
- Owned by: Jockey Club Brasileiro
- Date opened: 11 June 1926
- Course type: Thoroughbred flat racing

Hipódromo da Gávea, originally known as Hipódromo Brasileiro, is a horse racing course, located in the Gávea neighborhood in Rio de Janeiro, Brazil.

== History ==
Hipódromo da Gávea was built in 1926 and opened in July of that year under the name Hipódromo Brasileiro. In May 1932, the Jockey Club Brasileiro, formed earlier that year from the merging of the Derby Club and Jockey Club, held its first meet at Hipódromo da Gávea.

Hipódomo da Gávea was designed as a replica of the old Longchamp course in France.

The Grande Prêmio Brasil was first run in 1933 and is the premier horse race in Brazil. Since its inauguration, it has been run at Hipódromo da Gávea and is the centerpiece of the racecourse's international meet in June.

In honor of the racecourse's 90th anniversary in 2022, celebratory events were held, including a light show featuring over 100 drones after the running of the Grande Prêmio Brasil.

== Facilities ==
The largest racecourse in Brazil, Hipódromo da Gávea occupies an area of 643,000 meters squared, extending across five neighborhoods of Rio de Janeiro: Leblon, Gávea, Jardim Botânico, Lagoa, and Ipanema.

There are four buildings comprising the Jockey Club Brasileiro headquarters at Hipódromo da Gávea, built in the Louis XVI style. They were designed by Archimedes Memória and Francisque Couchet.

Approximately 105 stables house the over 1000 horses stabled at the racecourse.

There are 10 restaurants located on the premises.
