= Triple Crown of Thoroughbred Racing =

3-race horse honor in various countries

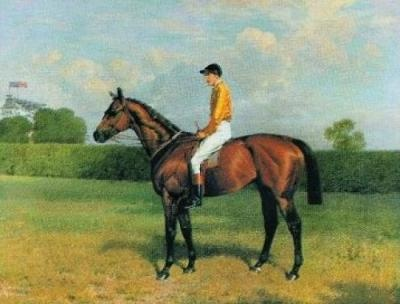
- Ormonde, an undefeated English Triple Crown winner
- Inaugurated: 1853 (173 years ago)

The Triple Crown of Thoroughbred Racing, often shortened to Triple Crown, is a series of horse races for Thoroughbreds, often restricted to three-year-olds. Winning all three of these Thoroughbred horse races is considered the greatest accomplishment in Thoroughbred racing. The term originated in mid-19th-century England and nations where Thoroughbred racing is popular, each having their own Triple Crown series.

== England ==
In England, where the term Triple Crown originated with West Australian's three wins in 1853, it is made up of:

1. The 2,000 Guineas Stakes, run over 1 mile (1,609 metres) at Newmarket Racecourse in Newmarket, Suffolk
2. The Derby, run over 1 mile 4 furlongs and 10 yards (2,423 metres) at Epsom Downs Racecourse in Epsom, Surrey
3. The St Leger Stakes, run over 1 mile 6 furlongs and 132 yards (2,937 metres) at Town Moor in Doncaster, Yorkshire

Since the 2,000 Guineas was first run in 1809, fifteen horses (including three winners of substitute races at Newmarket during the First World War) have won the English Triple Crown. The most recent – and only winner since World War II – was Nijinsky, in 1970. For many years, it was considered unlikely that any horse would ever win the English Triple Crown again. In the winter of 2006/2007, however, trainer Jim Bolger was training his unbeaten colt Teofilo for the Triple Crown and bookmaker William Hill plc was offering odds of only 12/1 on Teofilo winning the 2007 Triple Crown. The horse was withdrawn from the 2000 Guineas two days before the race after suffering a setback and never raced again.

Since Nijinsky, only Nashwan (1989), Sea the Stars (2009) and Camelot (2012) have won both the Guineas and the Derby. Between Reference Point in 1987 and Camelot in 2012, no Derby winner (not even the potential Triple Crown winners Nashwan and Sea the Stars) even entered the St. Leger. This reluctance to compete in the St. Leger is said to be because of the impact it would have on a horse's stud value in a market where speed is preferred to stamina.

=== Triple Crown winners ===
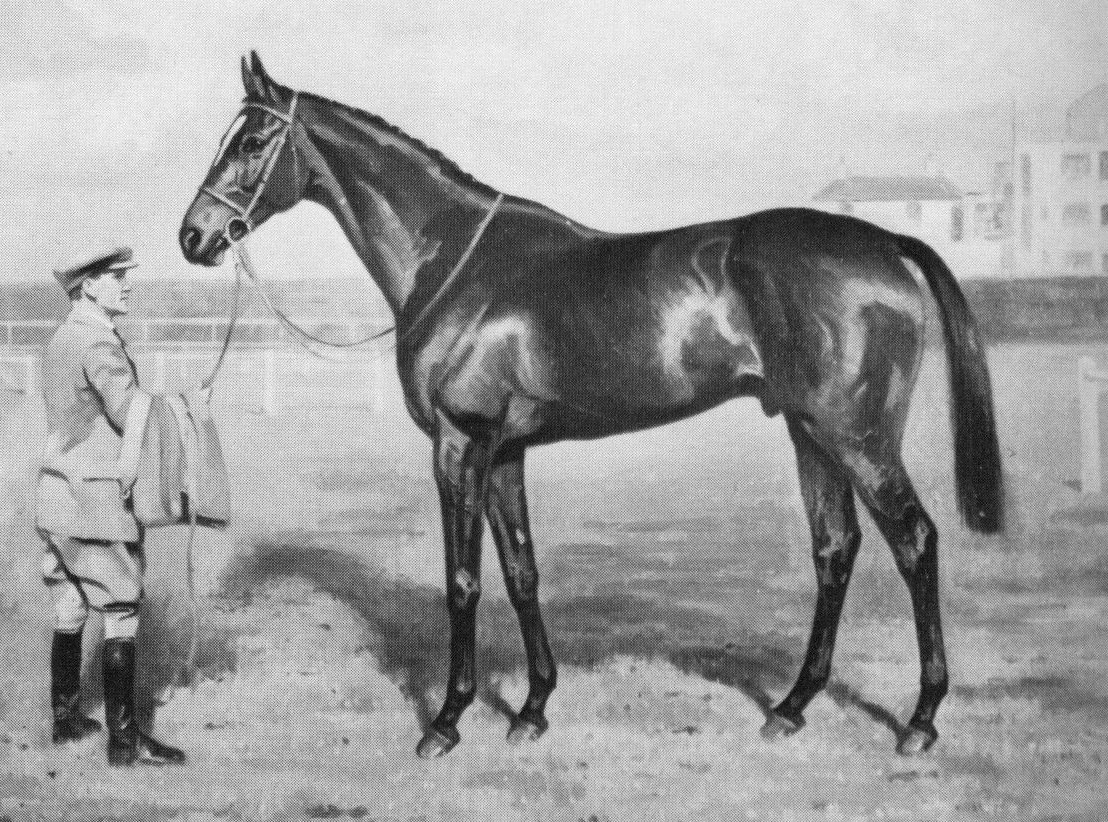
Bahram, an undefeated Triple Crown winner

Triple Crown winners:

Year	Winner	Jockey	Trainer	Owner
1853	West Australian	Frank Butler	John Scott	John Bowes
1865	Gladiateur	Harry Grimshaw	Tom Jennings, Sr.	Frédéric de Lagrange
1866	Lord Lyon	Harry Custance	James Dover	Richard Sutton
1886	Ormonde	Fred Archer and George Barrett	John Porter	Duke of Westminster
1891	Common	George Barrett	John Porter	Sir Frederick Johnstone
1893	Isinglass	Tommy Loates	James Jewitt	Harry McCalmont
1897	Galtee More	Charles Wood	Sam Darling	John Gubbins
1899	Flying Fox	Morny Cannon	John Porter	Duke of Westminster
1900	Diamond Jubilee	Herbert Jones	Richard Marsh	Prince of Wales
1903	Rock Sand	Danny Maher	George Blackwell	Sir James Miller
1915†	Pommern	Steve Donoghue	Charles Peck	Solly Joel
1917†	Gay Crusader	Steve Donoghue	Alec Taylor, Jr.	Alfred W. Cox
1918†	Gainsborough	Joe Childs	Alec Taylor, Jr.	Lady James Douglas
1935	Bahram	Freddie Fox and Charlie Smirke	Frank Butters	HH Aga Khan III
1970	Nijinsky	Lester Piggott	Vincent O'Brien	Charles W. Engelhard, Jr.

=== Failed Triple Crown attempts ===
The following horses won the 2000 Guineas and Derby but were beaten in the St Leger:

- Cotherstone (1843): second to Nutwith
- Pretender (1869): fourth to Pero Gomez
- Shotover (1882): third to Dutch Oven
- Ayrshire (1888): sixth to Seabreeze
- Ladas (1894): second to Throstle
- St. Amant (1904): seventh and last to Pretty Polly
- Minoru (1909): fourth to Bayardo
- Manna (1925): tenth to Solario
- Cameronian (1931): tenth and last to Sandwich
- Camelot (2012): second to Encke

Additionally:

- Blue Peter won 2000 Guineas and Derby in 1939 but St Leger was cancelled due to World War II.

=== Fillies Triple Crown ===
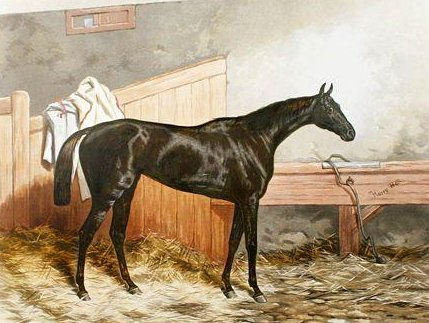
Formosa, Triple Crown Winner of 1868, by Harry Hall

There is also a Fillies Triple Crown for a filly winning the 1,000 Guineas Stakes, Epsom Oaks and St. Leger Stakes. In the past, this was not considered a true Triple Crown as the best fillies would often run in the Derby and Two Thousand Guineas. As this is no longer the case, the Fillies' Triple Crown would now be considered as comparable as the original. Winners of the Fillies Triple Crown are:

- Formosa – 1868 (also dead heated in the Two Thousand Guineas)
- Hannah – 1871
- Apology – 1874 (also won the Ascot Gold Cup)
- La Fleche – 1892 (also won the Ascot Gold Cup)
- Sceptre – 1902 (also won the Two Thousand Guineas)
- Pretty Polly – 1904
- Sun Chariot – 1942
- Meld – 1955
- Oh So Sharp – 1985

=== Stayers' Triple Crown ===
The Stayers Triple Crown consists of the most prestigious long-distance races in the British flat racing season:

1. The Ascot Gold Cup, raced over 2m 4f during Royal Ascot,
2. The Goodwood Cup, raced over 2m during the Goodwood Festival,
3. The Doncaster Cup, raced over 2m 2f during the St Leger Festival.

Year	Winner	Jockey	Trainer	Owner
1879	Isonomy	Tom Cannon	John Porter	Frederick Gretton
1949	Alycidon	Doug Smith	Walter Earl	Edward Stanley, 18th Earl of Derby
1953	Souepi	Charlie Elliott	George Digby	George Digby
1979	Le Moss	Lester Piggott, Joe Mercer	Henry Cecil	Carlo d'Alessio
1980	Le Moss	Joe Mercer	Henry Cecil	Carlo d'Alessio
1986	Longboat	Willie Carson	Dick Hern	Dick Hollingsworth
1995	Double Trigger	Jason Weaver	Mark Johnston	R W Huggins
2019	Stradivarius	Frankie Dettori	John Gosden	Bjorn Nielsen

== United States ==
=== Triple Crown winners ===
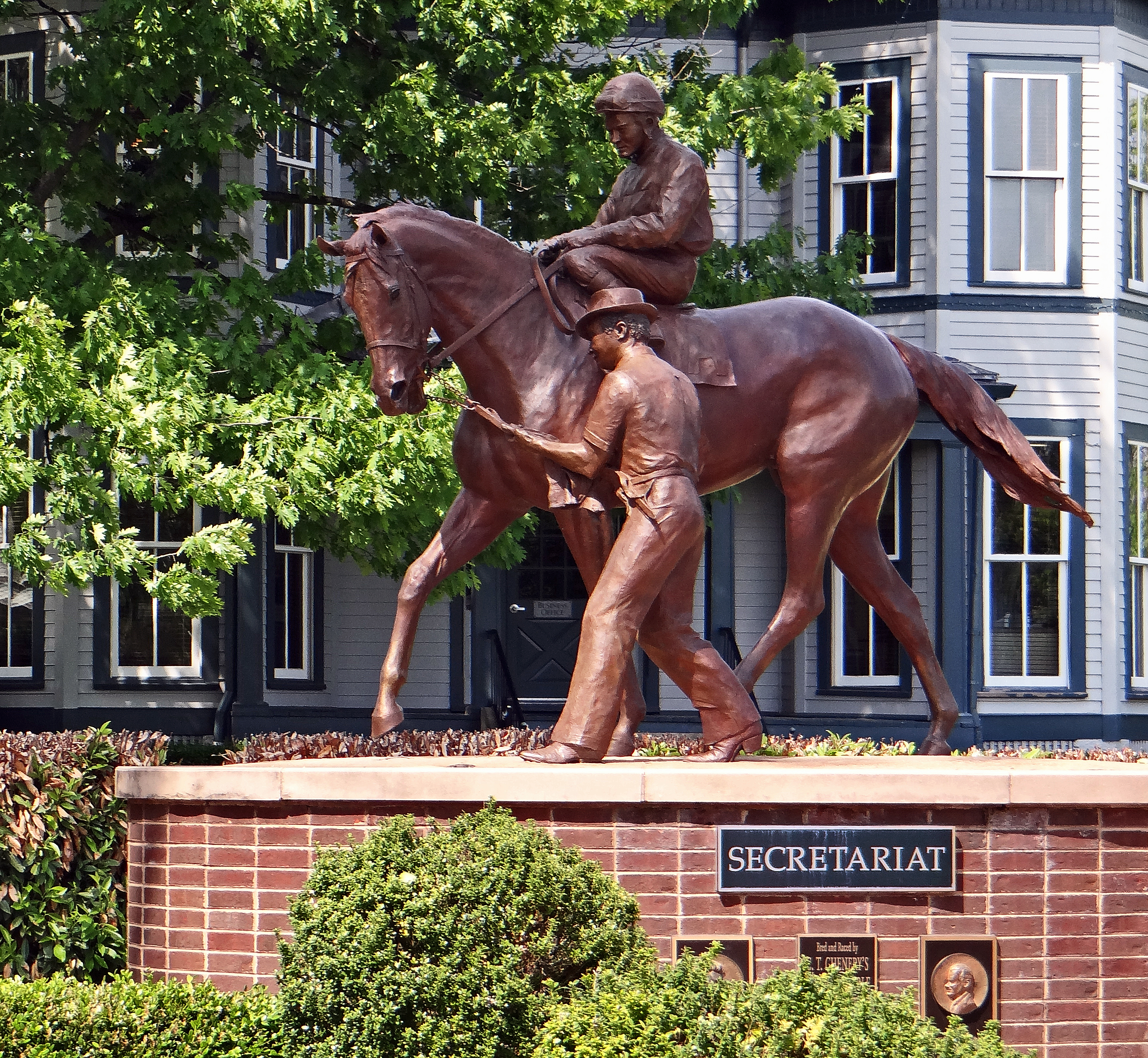
Secretariat, American Triple Crown winner

In the United States, the three races that make up the Triple Crown are:

1. Kentucky Derby, run over 1 1/4 miles (2.0 km) on a dirt track at Churchill Downs in Louisville, Kentucky
2. Preakness Stakes, run over 1 3/16 miles (1.9 km) on a dirt track at Pimlico Race Course in Baltimore, Maryland
3. Belmont Stakes, run over 1 1/2 miles (2.4 km) on a dirt track at Belmont Park in Elmont, New York, just east of New York City

List of US Triple Crown winners
Year	Winner	Jockey	Trainer	Owner	Breeder
1919	Sir Barton	Johnny Loftus	H. Guy Bedwell	J. K. L. Ross	John E. Madden
1930	Gallant Fox	Earl Sande	Jim Fitzsimmons	Belair Stud	Belair Stud
1935	Omaha	Willie Saunders	Jim Fitzsimmons	Belair Stud	Belair Stud
1937	War Admiral	Charley Kurtsinger	George H. Conway	Samuel D. Riddle	Samuel D. Riddle
1941	Whirlaway	Eddie Arcaro	Ben A. Jones	Calumet Farm	Calumet Farm
1943	Count Fleet	Johnny Longden	Don Cameron	Fannie Hertz	Fannie Hertz
1946	Assault	Warren Mehrtens	Max Hirsch	King Ranch	King Ranch
1948	Citation	Eddie Arcaro	Horace A. Jones	Calumet Farm	Calumet Farm
1973	Secretariat	Ron Turcotte	Lucien Laurin	Meadow Stable	Meadow Stud
1977	Seattle Slew	Jean Cruguet	William H. Turner, Jr.	Mickey and Karen L. Taylor; Tayhill Stable/Jim Hill, et al.	Ben S. Castleman
1978	Affirmed	Steve Cauthen	Laz Barrera	Harbor View Farm	Harbor View Farm
2015	American Pharoah	Victor Espinoza	Bob Baffert	Ahmed Zayat	Zayat Stables
2018	Justify	Mike E Smith	Bob Baffert	WinStar Farm, et al.	John D. Gunther

=== Triple Tiara ===
There have been several different versions of the Triple Tiara (sometimes known as the Filly Triple Crown) in the United States. One of them was a national version that consisted of undercard events on the same weekends as the associated Triple Crown races:

1. Kentucky Oaks, run over 1 1/8 miles (1811 m) on a dirt track, at Churchill Downs;
2. Black-Eyed Susan Stakes, run over 1 1/8 miles (1811 m) (previously 1 1/16 mi or 1.7 km) on a dirt track, at Pimlico Race Course;
3. Acorn Stakes, run over 1 mile (1609 m) (previously 1 1/2 mi or 2.4 km) on a dirt track, at Belmont Park;

Only one filly won this version of the Triple Tiara, Davona Dale in 1979. Few have even tried as the short time between the Kentucky Oaks and Black-Eyed Susan is generally considered too short for fillies.

The most commonly accepted version of the Triple Tiara is the American Triple Tiara of Thoroughbred Racing which uses three races from New York. From 1957 to 2002, and 2007 to 2009, these three races were the Acorn Stakes, the Mother Goose Stakes, and the Coaching Club American Oaks. Eight fillies won this version of the New York Triple Tiara:

- Dark Mirage – 1968
- Shuvee – 1969
- Chris Evert – 1974
- Ruffian – 1975
- Davona Dale – 1979
- Mom's Command – 1985
- Open Mind – 1989
- Sky Beauty – 1993

In 2010, the NYRA changed the configuration of the Triple Tiara to include the Alabama Stakes instead of the Mother Goose. As of 2022, no filly has won the reconfigured Triple Tiara.

=== New York Handicap Triple ===
The New York Handicap Triple is a series of three handicap races run in New York. Although historically notable, the series is now essentially defunct, as two of the races are run on the same day, making a sweep impossible. In addition, only the Metropolitan Handicap maintains a top-level designation and continues to be run as a handicap. The series consists of:

1. Metropolitan Handicap, run over 1 mile (1609 m) on a dirt track, at Belmont Park;
2. Brooklyn Handicap (now run as the Brooklyn Invitational Stakes), run over 1 1/4 miles (2012 m) (now 1 1/2 miles (2414 m)) on a dirt track, at Belmont Park;
3. Suburban Handicap (now run as the Suburban Stakes), run over 1 1/4 miles (2012 m) on a dirt track, at Belmont Park;

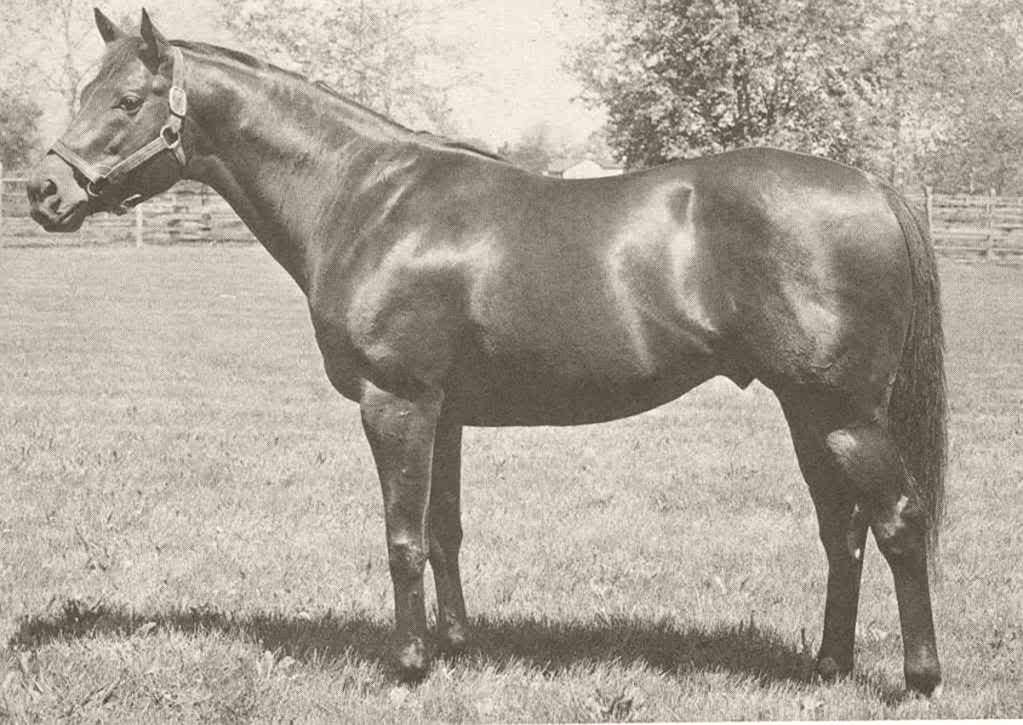
Tom Fool, winner of the New York Handicap Triple in 1953

The triple has been won by four horses:

- Whisk Broom II – 1913
- Tom Fool – 1953
- Kelso – 1961
- Fit to Fight – 1984

=== Turf Triple Series ===
In 2019, the New York Racing Association established two series of races for three-year-olds on the turf: the Turf Trinity and the Turf Tiara. As of 2022, neither has been swept by a singular horse.

The Turf Trinity consists of:

1. Belmont Derby, run over 1 1/4 miles (2012 m) on a turf track at Belmont Park
2. Saratoga Derby Invitational Stakes, run over 1 3/16 miles (1911 m) on a turf track at Saratoga
3. Jockey Club Derby, run over 1 1/2 miles (2414 m) on a turf track at Belmont Park

The Turf Tiara consists of:

1. Belmont Oaks, run over 1 1/4 miles (2012 m) on a turf track at Belmont Park
2. Saratoga Oaks Invitational Stakes, run over 1 3/16 miles (1911 m) on a turf track at Saratoga
3. Jockey Club Oaks, run over 1 3/8 miles (2213 m) on a turf track at Belmont Park

== Ireland ==
The Irish Triple Crown, modelled on the English equivalent, consists of:

1. Irish 2,000 Guineas, run over 1 mile (1609 m) on a turf track at the Curragh
2. Irish Derby, run over 1 1/2 miles (2414 m) on a turf track at the Curragh
3. Irish St. Leger, run over 1 3/4 miles (2816 m) on a turf track at the Curragh

For a list of the annual individual race winners, see Irish Triple Crown race winners.

Only two horses have won all three races since the Irish Two Thousand Guineas was first run in 1921:

- Museum – 1935
- Windsor Slipper – 1942

== Canada ==
The Canadian Triple Crown consists of:

1. King's Plate
2. Prince of Wales Stakes
3. Breeders' Stakes

=== Triple Crown winners ===
The Canadian Triple Crown was established in 1959 and since then seven horses have won it. In 2014, the Hall of Fame decided to honor the five horses who had won the three races before 1959, meaning 12 horses are now officially recognized as winning the Canadian Triple Crown.

==== Pre-1959 establishment ====
- Queensway (filly) – 1932
- Archworth – 1939
- Uttermost – 1945
- Ace Marine – 1955
- Canadian Champ – 1956

==== Since 1959 establishment ====
- New Providence – 1959
- Canebora – 1963
- With Approval – 1989
- Izvestia – 1990
- Dance Smartly (filly) – 1991
- Peteski – 1993
- Wando – 2003

=== Triple Tiara ===
The Canadian Triple Tiara consists of:

1. Woodbine Oaks (formerly the Canadian Oaks)
2. Bison City Stakes
3. Wonder Where Stakes

As of 2025, only one filly has won it:

- Sealy Hill – 2007

=== Western Canadian Triple Crown ===
On 9 May 2023, it was announced that Western Canada would have their own Triple Crown, also dubbed the Western Canadian Triple Crown. The Western Canadian Triple Crown consists of:

1. Manitoba Derby
2. Canadian Derby
3. British Columbia Derby

== Australia ==
The Australian Triple Crown comprises the following races:

1. Randwick Guineas, run over 1600 metres (0.99 mi) on a turf track at Randwick Racecourse
2. Rosehill Guineas, run over 2000 metres (1.2 mi) on a turf track at Rosehill Gardens Racecourse
3. AJC Australian Derby, run over 2400 metres (1.5 mi) on a turf track at Randwick Racecourse

The Australian Triple Crown initially included the Canterbury Guineas, which was replaced with the Randwick Guineas.

=== Triple Crown winners ===
- Moorland – 1943
- Martello Towers – 1959
- Imagele – 1973
- Octagonal – 1996
- Dundeel – 2013

=== The Spring Grand Slam ===
The Spring Grand Slam for older horses consists of:

1. Caulfield Cup, run over 2400 metres (1.5 mi) on a turf track at Caulfield Racecourse
2. Cox Plate, run over 2040 metres (1.27 mi) on a turf track at Moonee Valley Racecourse
3. Melbourne Cup, run over 3200 metres (2.0 mi) on a turf track at Flemington Racecourse

The only horse to win the Spring Grand Slam was the New Zealand bred Rising Fast in 1954.

=== The Two Year Old Triple Crown ===
The Two-Year-Old Triple Crown, also known as the Two-Year-Old Grand Slam, consists of:

1. Golden Slipper Stakes, run over 1200 metres (0.75 mi) on a turf track at Rosehill Gardens Racecourse
2. AJC Sires Produce Stakes, run over 1400 metres (0.87 mi) on a turf track at Randwick Racecourse
3. Champagne Stakes, run over 1600 metres (0.99 mi) on a turf track at Randwick Racecourse

Winners of the Two-Year-Old Triple Crown:

- Baguette – 1970
- Luskin Star – 1977
- Tierce – 1991
- Burst (filly) – 1992
- Dance Hero – 2004
- Pierro – 2012

== New Zealand ==
The New Zealand Triple Crown consists of:

1. Tarzino Trophy, run over 1400 metres (0.87 mi) on a turf track at Hawke's Bay Racecourse
2. Horlicks Plate, run over 1600 metres (0.99 mi) on a turf track at Hawke's Bay Racecourse
3. Livamol Spring Classic, run over 2040 metres (1.27 mi) on a turf track at Hawke's Bay Racecourse

The New Zealand Triple Crown is also known as the Hawke's Bay Triple Crown or Hastings Triple Crown as all three races are run there.

The only horse to win the New Zealand Triple Crown is Melody Belle in 2019.

=== New Triple Crown Series ===
Three new Triple Crown series were announced for the 2019/2020 season. Each series consists of three prestigious Group races with a $100,000 bonus for the winner of all three races.

The Weight-For-Age Triple Crown

- Zabeel Classic at Ellerslie Racecourse
- Herbie Dyke Stakes at Te Rapa
- New Zealand Stakes at Ellerslie Racecourse

The Sprint Triple Crown

- Railway Stakes at Ellerslie Racecourse
- Telegraph Stakes at Trentham
- Waikato Sprint Stakes at Te Rapa

The Fillies And Mares Triple Crown

- Cuddle Stakes at Trentham
- Breeders Stakes at Te Aroha
- Travis Stakes at Te Rapa

== Germany ==
In Germany, the Triple Crown (Dreifache Krone) consists of:

1. Mehl-Mülhens-Rennen (German 2000 Guineas, formerly Henckel-Rennen), run over 1600 metres (0.99 mi) on a turf track at Cologne-Weidenpesch Racecourse
2. Deutsches Derby (German Derby), run over 2400 metres (1.5 mi) on a turf track at Horner Rennbahn
3. Deutsches St. Leger, run over 2800 metres (1.7 mi) on a turf track at Dortmund Racecourse

Only one horse has won the German Triple Crown:

- Königsstuhl – 1979

In East Germany, the Dreifache Krone consisted of:

1. Frühjahrszuchtpreis der Dreijährigen
2. Derby der DDR (Derby of GDR)
3. Großer Herbstpreis der Dreijährigen

Three horses won the East German Triple Crown:

- Faktotum – 1955
- Gidron – 1979
- Lomber – 1987

== France ==
The French Triple Crown consists of:

1. Poule d'Essai des Poulains (French 2000 Guineas), run over 1600 metres (0.99 mi) on a turf track at Longchamp Racecourse
2. Prix du Jockey Club, run over 2100 metres (1.3 mi) on a turf track at Chantilly Racecourse
3. Grand Prix de Paris, run over 2400 metres (1.5 mi) on a turf track at Longchamp Racecourse

Previously the French Triple Crown consisted of:

1. Poule d'Essai des Poulains
2. Prix du Jockey Club
3. Prix Royal-Oak, run over 3100 metres (1.9 mi) on a turf track at Longchamp Racecourse

Two horses have swept the French Triple Crown:

- Zut – 1879
- Perth – 1899

The French Fillies Triple Crown consists of:

1. Poule d'Essai des Pouliches (French 1000 Guineas), run over 1600 metres (0.99 mi) on a turf track at Longchamp Racecourse
2. Prix de Diane, run over 2100 metres (1.3 mi) on a turf track at Chantilly Racecourse
3. Prix Vermeille, run over 2400 metres (1.5 mi) on a turf track at Longchamp Racecourse

Four fillies have won all three races:

- Nikellora – 1945
- Corteira – 1948
- Allez France – 1973
- Zarkava – 2008

Previously the French Triple Crown for fillies consisted of:

1. Poule d'Essai des Pouliche
2. Prix de Diane
3. Prix Royal-Oak

No filly ever won the series.

== Japan ==
Japan's JRA has two sets of races referred to as Triple Crowns. In addition, the NAR has announced that it would create its own Dirt Triple Crown starting from 2024, comprising the Haneda Hai, Tokyo Derby, and the Japan Dirt Derby.

=== Japanese Triple Crown ===
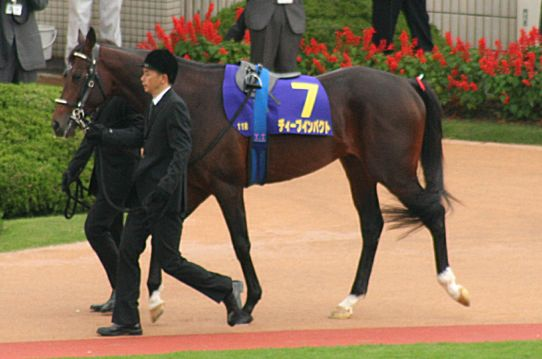
Deep Impact, winner of the 2005 Japanese Triple Crown

The Japanese Triple Crown for colts consists of:

1. Satsuki Shō (Japanese 2000 Guineas), run over 2000 metres (1.2 mi) on a turf track at Nakayama Racecourse in Funabashi, Chiba
2. Tōkyō Yūshun (Japanese Derby), run over 2400 metres (1.5 mi) on a turf track at Tokyo Racecourse in Fuchu, Tokyo
3. Kikuka-shō (Japanese St. Leger), run over 3000 metres (1.9 mi) on a turf track at Kyoto Racecourse in Kyoto, Kyoto

To date, eight horses have won the Japanese Triple Crown:

List of Japanese Triple Crown winners
Year	Winner	Jockey	Trainer	Owner	Breeder
1941	St Lite	Kizo Konishi	Waichiro Tanaka	Yusaku Kato	Koiwai Farm
1964	Shinzan	Masaru Kurita	Bungo Takeda	Kokichi Hashimoto	Yoshimatsu Matsuhashi
1983	Mr. C.B.	Masato Yoshinaga	Yasuhisa Matsuyama	Chigira Bokujo	Chigira Bokujo
1984	Symboli Rudolf	Yukio Okabe	Yuji Nohira	Symboli Stud	Symboli Stud
1994	Narita Brian	Katsumi Minai	Masaaki Okubo	Hidenori Yamaji	Hayata Bokujo
2005	Deep Impact	Yutaka Take	Yasuo Ikee	Makoto Kaneko	Northern Farm
2011	Orfevre	Kenichi Ikezoe	Yasutoshi Ikee	Sunday Racing	Shadai Corporation Shiraoi Farm
2020	Contrail	Yuichi Fukunaga	Yoshito Yahagi	Shinji Maeda	North Hills

=== Japanese Triple Tiara ===
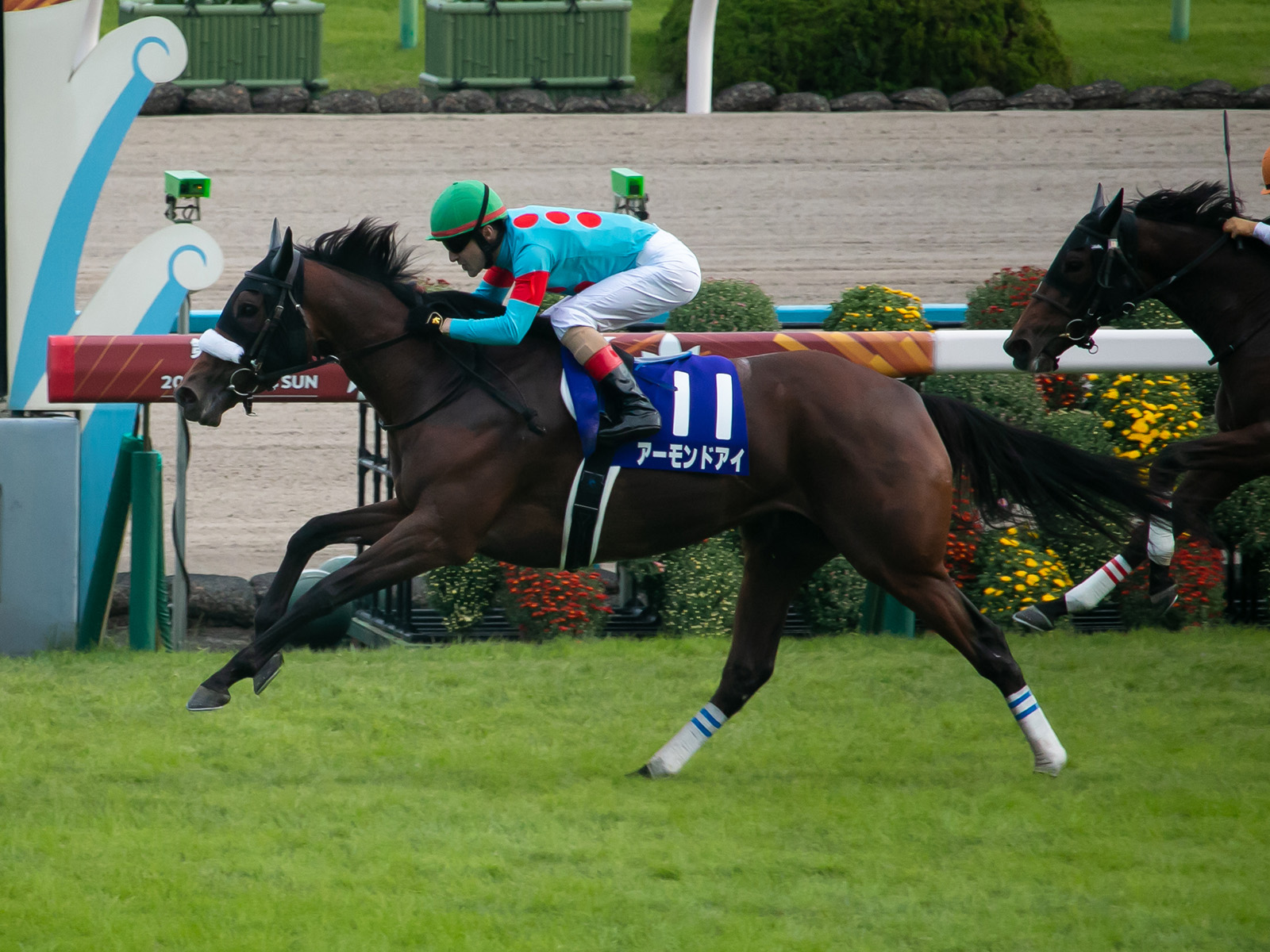
Almond Eye winning the Shuka Sho in 2018

The Japanese Triple Tiara, a triple crown for fillies, consists of:

1. the Oka Sho (Japanese 1000 Guineas), run over 1600 metres (0.99 mi) on a turf track at Hanshin Racecourse in Takarazuka, Hyogo
2. the Yushun Himba (Japanese Oaks), run over 2400 metres (1.5 mi) on a turf track at Tokyo Racecourse in Fuchu, Tokyo
3. the Shuka Sho, run over 2000 metres (1.2 mi) on a turf track at Kyoto Racecourse in Kyoto, Kyoto

From 1976 to 1995, the Queen Elizabeth II Commemorative Cup was the third leg.

To date, seven horses have won the Japanese Triple Tiara:

List of Japanese Triple Tiara winners
Year	Winner	Jockey	Trainer	Owner	Breeder
1986	Mejiro Ramonu	Hiroshi Kawachi	Shinji Okuhira	Mejiro Bokujo	Mejiro Bokujo
2003	Still in Love	Hideaki Miyuki	Shoichi Matsumoto	North Hills	Shimokobe Farm
2010	Apapane	Masayoshi Ebina	Sakae Kunieda	Makoto Kaneko	Northern Farm
2012	Gentildonna	Yasunari Iwata/Yuga Kawada	Sei Ishizaka	Sunday Racing	Northern Farm
2018	Almond Eye	Christophe Lemaire	Sakae Kunieda	Silk Racing	Northern Farm
2020	Daring Tact	Kohei Matsuyama	Haruki Sugiyama	Normandy Thoroughbred Racing	Hasegawa Bokujo
2023	Liberty Island	Yuga Kawada	Mitsumasa Nakauchida	Sunday Racing	Northern Farm

=== Japanese Dirt Triple Crown ===
The Japanese Dirt Triple Crown is run by the NAR instead of the JRA. Most dirt racing in Japan is run under the NAR. In 2022 the NAR announced an official Dirt Triple Crown that includes 3 pre-existing domestic Grade 1 races, all three of which are run on dirt tracks. These are:

- the Haneda Hai, run over 1800 metres (1.1 mi)
- the Tokyo Derby, run over 2000 metres (1.2 mi)
- the Japan Dirt Classic, run over 2000 metres (1.2 mi)

All three races are held at Oi Racecourse in Shinagawa, Tokyo, Japan. Although the Triple Crown did not debut until 2024, the three races comprising it have all been run since 1999. 3 horses have thus retroactively won a Dirt Triple Crown:

Year	Winner	Jockey	Trainer	Owner	Breeder
1999	Orion The Thanks	Hideharu Hayata	Kiyomatsu Akama	Keiko Hiura	Takanori Morinaga
2001	Toshin Blizzard	Takayuki Ishizaki	Kenji Sato	Eiichi Izumi	Kazue Muranaka
2023	Mick Fire	Norifumi Mikamoto	Kazuo Watanabe	Koichi Hoshika	Takahashi Farm

== Argentina ==
The three races that compose the Triple Crown in Argentina are:

1. Gran Premio Polla de Potrillos, run over 1600 metres (0.99 mi) on a dirt track at Hipodromo Argentino de Palermo
2. Gran Premio Jockey Club, run over 2000 metres (1.2 mi) on a turf track at Hipodromo de San Isidro
3. Gran Premio Nacional (Argentine Derby), run over 2500 metres (1.6 mi) on a dirt track at Hipodromo Argentino de Palermo

Winners of the Argentinian Triple Crown are:

- Pippermint – 1902
- Old Man – 1904
- Melgarejo – 1906
- Chopp – 1908
- Botafogo – 1917
- Mineral – 1931
- Silfo – 1934
- Sorteado – 1938
- Embrujo – 1939
- Yatasto – 1951
- Tatán – 1954
- Manantial – 1958
- Gobernado – 1964
- Forli – 1966
- Telescópico – 1978
- El Serrano – 1986
- Refinado Tom – 1996

A Quadruple Crown adding the Gran Premio Carlos Pellegrini, run over 2400 metres (1.5 mi) miles on the turf and open to older horses, is also recognised. Winners are:

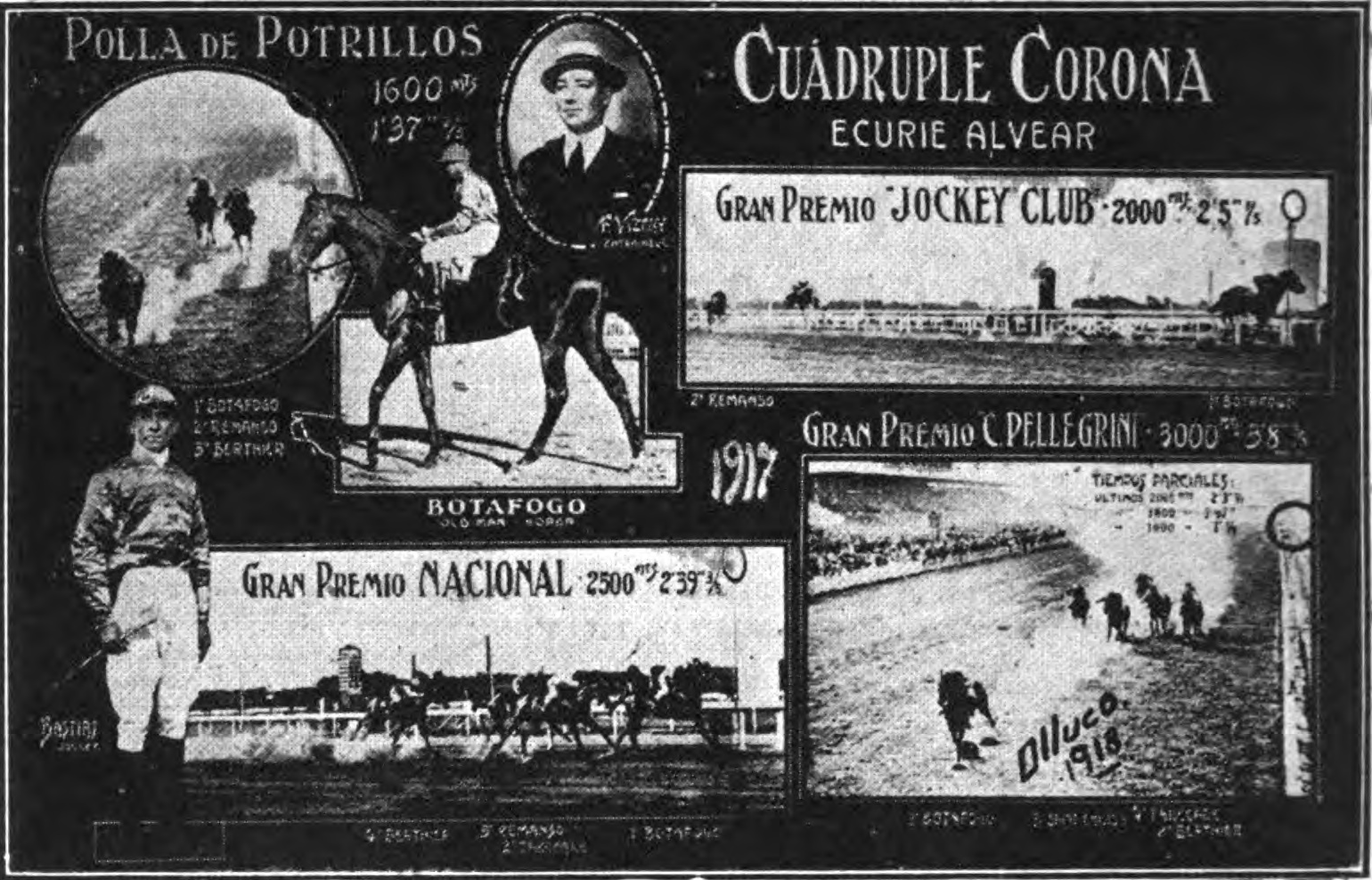
A collage of Botafogo's 1917 Argentinian Quadruple Crown

- Pippermint – 1902
- Old Man – 1904
- Botafogo – 1917
- Mineral – 1931
- Yatasto – 1951
- Manantial – 1958
- Forli – 1966
- Telescópico – 1978

The Argentinian Filly Triple Crown consists of:

1. Gran Premio Polla de Potrancas, run over 1600 metres (0.99 mi) on a dirt track at Hipodromo Argentino de Palermo (1 mile on dirt)
2. Gran Premio Jockey Club
3. Gran Premio Nacional (Argentine Derby)

Winners of the Argentinian Filly Triple Crown are:

- Sierra Balcarce – 1930
- La Mission – 1940 (also won Gran Premio Carlos Pellegrini)

Additionally, a San Isidro Colt Triple Crown and San Isidro Filly Triple Crown are recognised. The San Isidro Colt Triple Crown consists of:

1. Gran Premio Dos Mil Guineas, run over 1600 metres (0.99 mi) on a turf track at Hipódromo de San Isidro
2. Gran Premio Jockey Club, run over 2000 metres (1.2 mi) on a turf track at Hipódromo de San Isidro
3. Gran Premio Carlos Pellegrini, run over 2400 metres (1.5 mi) on a turf track at Hipódromo de San Isidro

Winners of the San Isidro Colt Triple Crown are:

- Chullo – 1997
- Asidero – 1999
- Hi Happy – 2015

The San Isidro Filly Triple Crown consists of:

1. Gran Premio Diamante, run over 1600 metres (0.99 mi) on a turf track at Hipódromo de San Isidro
2. Gran Premio Jockey Club
3. Gran Premio Carlos Pellegrini

As of 2023, no horse has won all three races.

== Brazil ==
Brazil has triple crowns run at multiple tracks, including at Hipódromo da Gávea (Rio de Janeiro) and at Hipódromo de Cidade Jardim (São Paulo).

The Rio de Janeiro Triple Crown consists of:

1. Grande Prêmio Estado do Rio de Janeiro, run over 1600 metres (0.99 mi) on a turf track
2. Grande Prêmio Francisco Eduardo de Paula Machado, run over 2000 metres (1.2 mi) on a turf track
3. Grande Prêmio Cruzeiro do Sul (Brazilian Derby), run over 2400 metres (1.5 mi) on a turf track

Winners are:

- Talvez! – 1941
- Criolan – 1942
- Quiproquó – 1953
- Timão – 1956
- Escorial – 1959
- African Boy – 1979
- Old Master – 1984
- Itajara – 1987
- Groove – 1996
- Super Power – 2000
- Plenty of Kicks – 2012
- Bal a Bali – 2014

Prior to 1963, the Rio de Janeiro Triple Crown consisted of the Grande Prêmio Outono (1600 metres (0.99 mi) on turf), Grande Prêmio Cruzeiro do Sul, and Grande Prêmio Distrito Federal (3000 metres (1.9 mi) on turf). From 1963 to 1993, it consisted of the Grande Prêmio Estado do Rio de Janeiro, Grande Prêmio Cruzeiro do Sul, and Grande Prêmio Jockey Club Brasileiro (3200 metres (2.0 mi) on turf). From 1994 to 2003, the order of the Grande Prêmio Jockey Club Brasileiro and Grande Prêmio Cruzeiro do Sul were reversed in order. The current configuration started in 2004.

The Rio de Janeiro Filly Triple Crown consists of:

1. Grande Prêmio Henrique Possolo, run over 1600 metres (0.99 mi) on a turf track
2. Grande Prêmio Diana, run over 2000 metres (1.2 mi) on a turf track
3. Grande Prêmio Zélia Gonzaga Peixoto de Castro, run over 2400 metres (1.5 mi) on a turf track

Winners are:

- Indian Chris – 1991
- Virginie – 1997
- Be Fair – 2000
- Old Tune – 2012
- No Regrets – 2017
- Janelle Monae – 2021

The São Paulo Triple Crown consists of:

1. Grande Prêmio Ipiranga, run over 1600 metres (0.99 mi) on a turf track
2. Grande Prêmio Jockey Club de São Paulo, run over 2000 metres (1.2 mi) on a turf track
3. Grande Prêmio Derby Paulista, run over 2400 metres (1.5 mi) on a turf track

Winners are:

- Jacutinga – 1933
- Funny Boy – 1936
- El Faro – 1943
- Estouvado – 1944
- Farwell – 1959
- Giant – 1967
- Cacique Negro – 1989
- Quari Bravo – 1997
- Roxinho – 2001
- Fixador – 2013
- Halston – 2018

Historically, the São Paulo Triple Crown ran without the Grande Prêmio Jockey Club de São Paulo, with the Grande Prêmio Consagração (3000 metres (1.9 mi) on a turf track) being run as the third and final leg.

The São Paulo Filly Triple Crown consists of:

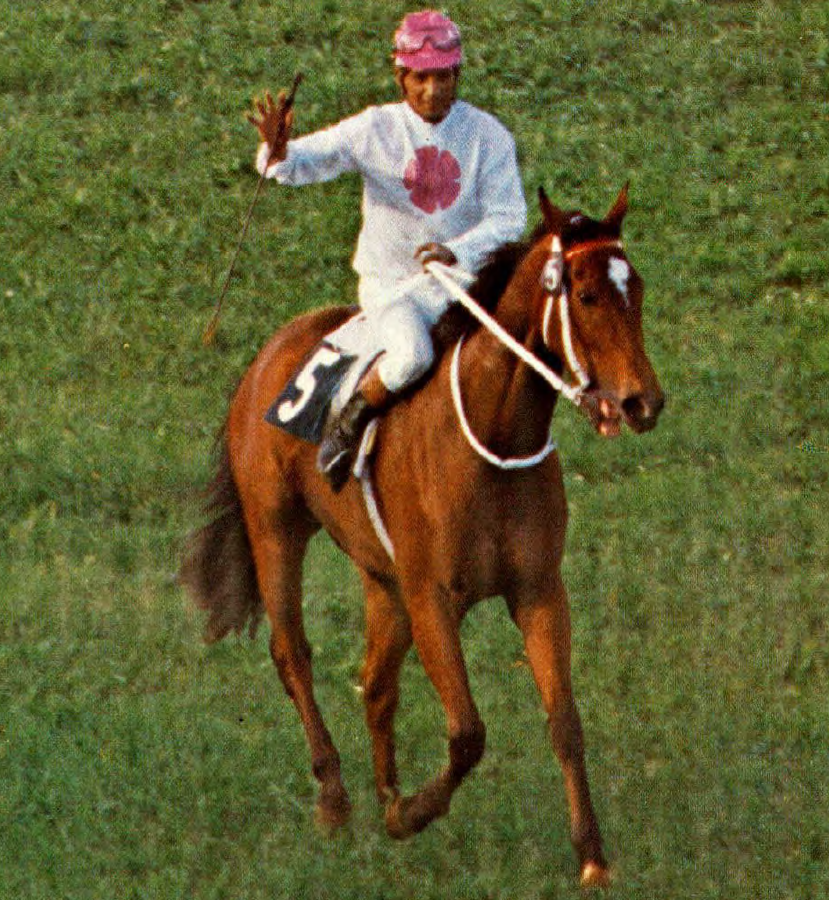
Emerald Hill, winner of the São Paulo Filly Triple Crown in 1977

1. Grande Prêmio Barão de Piracicaba, run over 1600 metres (0.99 mi) on a turf track
2. Grande Prêmio Henrique de Toledo Lara, run over 1800 metres (1.1 mi) on a turf track
3. Grande Prêmio Diana, run over 2000 metres (1.2 mi) on a turf track

Winners are:

- Dulce – 1957
- Olhada – 1961
- Jembélia – 1963
- Emerald Hill – 1977
- Colina Verde – 2006

The Rio Grande do Sul Triple Crown, as of 1985, consists of:

1. Grande Prêmio Linneu de Paula Machado, run over 1609 metres (1.0 mi) on a dirt track
2. Grande Prêmio Cel. Caminha, run over 2000 metres (1.2 mi) on a turf track
3. Grande Prêmio Derby Rio-grandense, run over 2400 metres (1.5 mi) on a dirt track

Winners are:

- Interstar – 1985

== Chile ==
The three races that compose the national Triple Crown in Chile are:

1. Clásico El Ensayo, run over 2400 metres (1.5 mi) on a turf track at Club Hipico de Santiago
2. Clásico St. Leger, run over 2200 metres (1.4 mi) on a dirt track at Hipodromo Chile
3. El Derby, run over 2400 metres (1.5 mi) on a turf track at Valparaiso Sporting Club.

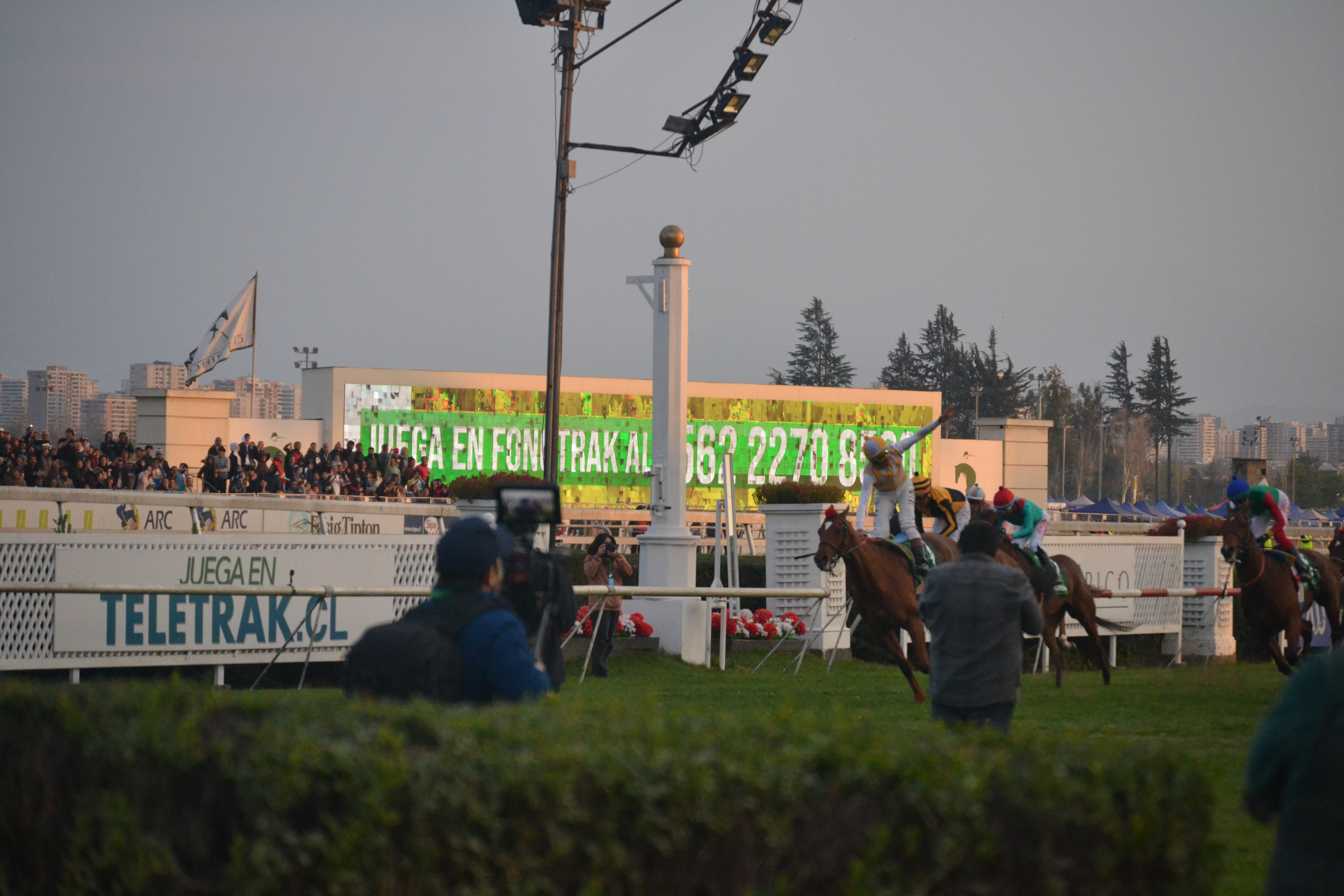
Kay Army, winner of the Chilean Triple Crown, winning the Clásico El Ensayo in 2023

Winners of the Chilean Triple Crown are:

- Cachaporal – 1885/86
- Wanderer – 1887/88
- Dorama – 1915/16
- Tutti Frutti – 1927/28
- Freire – 1930/31
- Grimsby – 1938/39
- Tábano – 1945/46
- Empire – 1950/51
- Eugenia – 1955/56
- Prólogo – 1965/66
- Wolf – 1990/91
- Fortino – 2022/23
- Kay Army – 2023/24

Additionally, the Hipódromo Chile has multiple recognized Triple Crowns. The Filly Triple Crown consists of:

1. Clásico Tanteo de Potrancas, run over 1500 metres (0.93 mi) on a dirt track
2. Clásico Mil Guineas, run over 1600 metres (0.99 mi) on a dirt track
3. Clásico Alberto Solari Magnasco, run over 2000 metres (1.2 mi) run on a dirt track

There have been four winners:

- Cremcaramel – 1999
- Printemps – 2000
- Amani – 2011
- Wow Cat – 2017

The Triple Crown consists of:

1. Clásico Dos Mil Guineas (for colts) or Clásico Mil Guineas (for fillies), both run over 1600 metres (0.99 mi) on a dirt track
2. Clásico Gran Criterium Mauricio Serrano Palma, run over 1900 metres (1.2 mi) on a dirt track
3. Clásico St. Leger

There have been nine winners:

- Geologo – 1984
- Lido Palace – 2000
- Trotamondo – 2004
- Hakassan – 2012
- Incentive Boy – 2015
- Big Daddy – 2016
- Wow Cat † – 2017
- Cariblanco – 2018
- The Goat - 2024

† Designates a filly winner

Chile also has a Two-Year-Old Triple Crown, with all three races run on turf at Valparaiso Sporting Club. It consists of:

1. Clásico El Estreno [Nicanor Señoret], run over 1300 metres (0.81 mi)
2. Clásico Gran Premio Gonzalo Bofill De Caso, run over 1400 metres (0.87 mi)
3. Clásico Copa de Plata Italo Traverso, run over 1500 metres (0.93 mi)

There have been five winners:

- Campo Marzio – 1991
- Barrio Chino – 1992
- Early Gray – 1993
- Castelnuovo – 1994
- Sandy Bay – 2016
- Toy Soltero – 2023

== Mexico ==
=== Mexican Triple Crown ===
The Mexican Triple Crown consists of:

1. Stakes Jockey Club Mexicano (GI), run over 1 mile (1600 m) on a dirt track
2. Gran Premio Nacional (Mexico) (GII), run over 1 1/16 miles (1700 m) on a dirt track
3. Derby Mexicano (GI), run over 1 1/8 miles (1800 m) on a dirt track

There have been a total of 9 winners as of 2025:

- Plucky Flag (USA) – 1946
- Re-Torta (USA) – 1948
- Cachava (MEX) – 1966
- Gran Zar (MEX) – 1978
- Pikotazo (MEX) – 1980
- Dominicano (MEX) – 2002
- Huitlacoche (MEX) – 2015
- Kukulkán (MEX) – 2018
- Iniesta (MEX) – 2022

=== Mexican Fillies' Triple Crown ===
The Mexican Fillies' Triple Crown series consists of :

1. Clasico Rubi (7 furlongs)
2. Clasico Esmeralda (8 furlongs)
3. Clasico Diamante (8 1/2 furlongs)

Winners of the Mexican Fillies' Triple Crown are:

- She's A Lady Race - 2005
- That's Life - 2007
- Kutzamala - 2018
- Sabalenka - 2025

All the races that compose the Mexican Triple Crown and the Mexican Fillies' Triple Crown are hosted at the Hipódromo de las Américas in Mexico City.

== Panama ==
=== Crown Races ===
The races that make up the Triple Crown in Panama are held at the Hipódromo Presidente Remón and are as follows:

1. Primera Gema: Clásico Arturo, Eric, Max, Eric Arturo, and Eric Antonio Delvalle ^{(Grade 2) (1800 m)}

2. Segunda Gema: Clásico Augusto Samuel Boyd Paredes and Daniela Boyd ^{(Grade 2) (1800 m)}

3. Tercera Gema: Clásico Carlos Eleta Almarán, Fernando Eleta Almarán, and Raquel Eleta ^{(Grade 2) (1800 m)}

In Panamanian racing history, 17 horses have achieved the Triple Crown. Pindín was the first Triple Crown winner in 1964, while Indian Music was the most recent, securing the title in 2026.

=== Winners ===
Year	Winner	Jockey
1964	Pindín	José María Bravo / Víctor Tejada
1966	Tojo	Guillermo Milord
1967	Iván	Víctor Tejada
1972	Eugenio	Mario Torres
1973	Montecarlo	Marcel Zúñiga
1976	El Manut	Marcelino Pedroza / Víctor Tejada
1978	El Gran Capo	Nicanor Navarro
1992	Leonardo	Cornelio Velásquez
1994	El Chacal	Cornelio Velásquez
1995	Rey Arturo	Jesús Anel Barría
1998	Evaristo	Jesús Anel Barría
2004	Spago	Ángel Rivas
2008	Oxsai	Ángel Rivas
2010	Voy porque voy	Luis Arango
2019	Señor Concerto	José Ángel Batista
2023	El Rojo	Lorenzo Lezcano
2026	Indian Music	Yonis Lasso

== Peru ==
The Peruvian Triple Crown consists of:

1. Polla de Potrillos, run over 1600 metres (0.99 mi) on a dirt track
2. Gran Premio Ricardo Ortíz de Zevallos, run over 2000 metres (1.2 mi) on a dirt track
3. Derby Nacional, run over 2400 metres (1.5 mi) on a dirt track

Winners are:

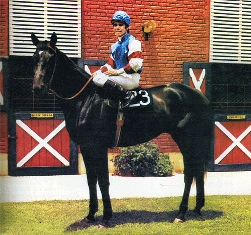
Santorín, winner of the Peruvian Quadruple Crown in 1973

- Don Manuel – 1936/1937
- Pulgarín – 1941/1942
- Imperio – 1948/49
- Llanero – 1950/51
- Río Pallanga – 1955/56
- Perigold – 1957/58
- Daré – 1962/63
- Trastévere – 1968/69
- Santorín – 1973
- Vaduz – 1979
- Stash – 1992
- Grozny – 1998
- Muller – 2006
- Super Nao – 2021
- Paradigma – 2022

The Peruvian Filly Triple Crown consists of:

1. Polla de Potrancas, run over 1600 metres (0.99 mi) on a dirt track
2. Gran Premo Enrique Ayulo Pardo, run over 2000 metres (1.2 mi) on a dirt track
3. Derby Nacional

Winners are:

- Monona – 1944/45
- Pamplona – 1959/60
- Batuka – 1999

A Quadruple Crown adding the Gran Premio Nacional Augusto B. Leguia, run over 2800 metres (1.7 mi) on a turf track, is also recognised. Winners are:

- Pamplona – 1959/60
- Santorín – 1973
- Stash – 1992

Horses that have won any combination of three of the above races are also sometimes considered Triple Crown winners. Horses that have done this are:

- Premier – 1947/1948
  - Won Gran Premio Ricardo Ortíz de Zevallos, Derby Nacional, Gran Premio Nacional Augusto B. Leguia
- Insuperable – 1949/1950
  - Won Polla de Potrillos, Gran Premio Ricardo Ortíz de Zevallos, Gran Premio Nacional Augusto B. Leguia
- Tenaz – 1972
  - Won Polla de Potrillos, Gran Premio Ricardo Ortíz de Zevallos, Gran Premio Nacional Augusto B. Leguia
- Acropolitana – 1974
  - Won Polla de Potrances, Gran Premo Enrique Ayulo Pardo, Gran Premio Nacional Augusto B. Leguia
- Tattoo – 1982
  - Won Polla de Potrillos, Gran Premio Ricardo Ortíz de Zevallos, Gran Premio Nacional Augusto B. Leguia
- Mari July – 1990
  - Won Polla de Potrances, Gran Premo Enrique Ayulo Pardo, Gran Premio Nacional Augusto B. Leguia

== Hong Kong ==
The Triple Crown series at Hong Kong's Sha Tin Racecourse consists of three races at increasingly longer distances. Unlike most other Triple Crown events, these races are not confined to three-year-olds. They are:

1. Hong Kong Stewards' Cup, run over 1600 metres (0.99 mi)
2. Hong Kong Gold Cup, run over 2000 metres (1.2 mi)
3. Hong Kong Champions & Chater Cup, run over 2400 metres (1.5 mi)

There have been three horses to win the Hong Kong Triple Crown:

- River Verdon – 1994
- Voyage Bubble – 2025
- Romantic Warrior - 2026

There are two other Triple Crown series: the Hong Kong Speed Series and the Four-Year-Old Classic Series.

Hong Kong Speed Series (International Group 1):

1. Centenary Sprint Cup, run over 1200 metres (0.75 mi)
2. Queen's Silver Jubilee Cup, run over 1400 metres (0.87 mi)
3. Chairman's Sprint Prize, run over 1200 metres (0.75 mi)

Winners of the Hong Kong Speed Series are:

- Mr. Vitality – 1995/96
- Grand Delight – 2002/03
- Silent Witness – 2003/04, 2004/05
- Lucky Sweynesse – 2022/23
- Ka Ying Rising – 2024/2025, 2025/2026
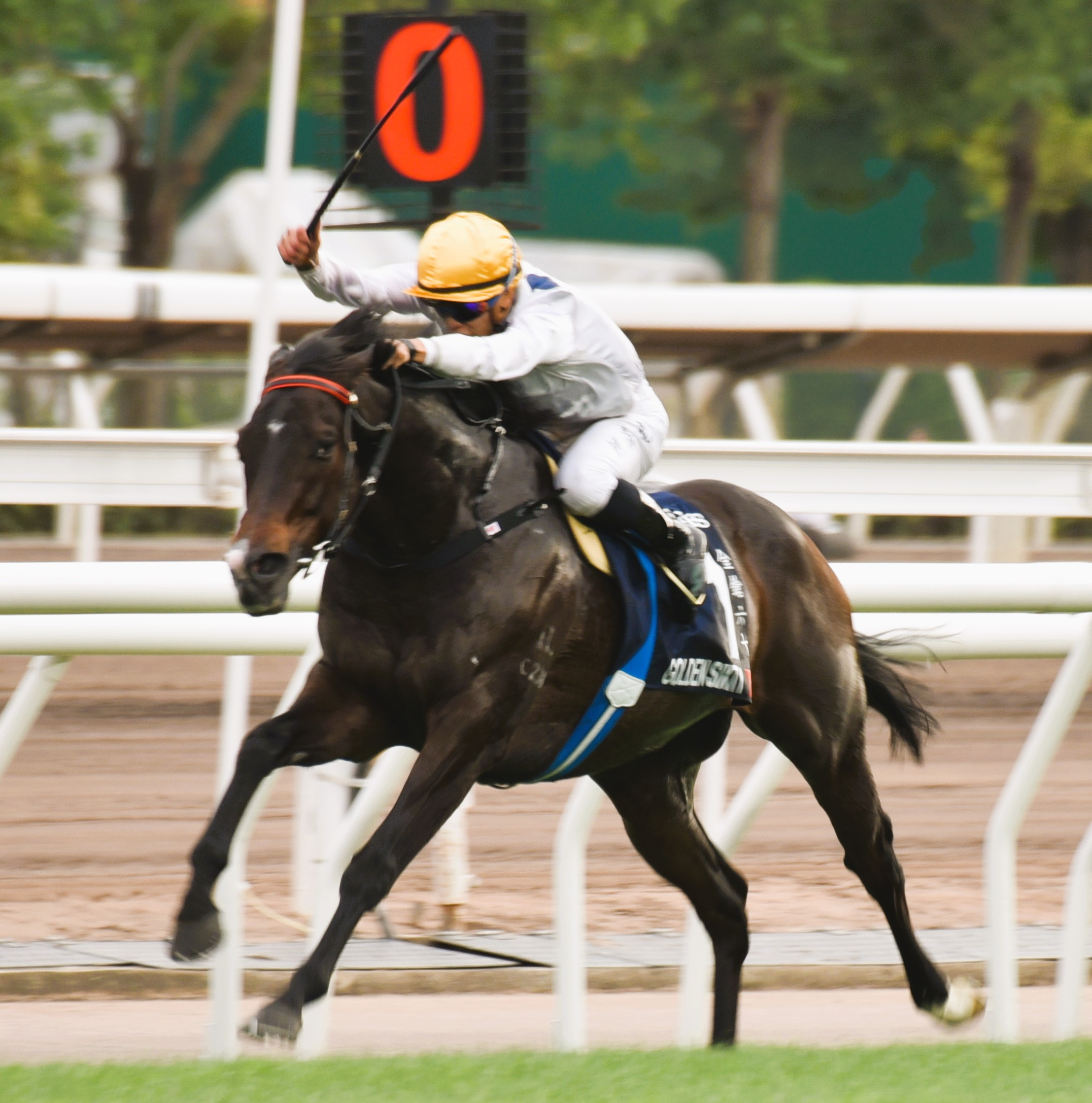
  Golden Sixty, winner of the Hong Kong Four-Year-Old Classic Series in 2020

Four-Year-Old Classic Series (Domestic Group 1):

Restricted to four-year-old horses.

1. Hong Kong Classic Mile, run over 1600 metres (0.99 mi)
2. Hong Kong Classic Cup, run over 1800 metres (1.1 mi)
3. Hong Kong Derby, run over 2000 metres (1.2 mi)

Winners of the Four-Year-Old Classic Series are:

- Rapper Dragon – 2017
- Golden Sixty – 2020

== South Korea ==
The current Triple Crown series that started in 2008 consists of:

1. Korea Mile Cup run over 1600 meters at Busan-Gyeongnam Racecourse
2. Korean Derby, Run over 1800 meters at LetsRun Park Seoul
3. The Minister of Agriculture Cup over 2000 meters at LetsRun Park Seoul

Currently only one horse has swept this modern version of the Triple Crown

1. Power Blade

Originally the Triple Crown was started a year prior in 2007 and consisted of:

1. Ttukseom Cup, run over 1400 meters at LetsRun Park Seoul
2. Korean Derby, Run over 1800 meters at LetsRun Park Seoul
3. The Minister of Agriculture Cup over 2000 meters at LetsRun Park Seoul

In the only year it was run it produced a Triple Crown winner

1. J.S Hold

== Italy ==
The Triple Crown series consists of:

1. Premio Parioli, run over 1600 metres (0.99 mi) at Capannelle Racecourse
2. Derby Italiano, run over 2200 metres (1.4 mi) at Capannelle Racecourse in Rome
3. St. Leger Italiano, run over 2800 metres (1.7 mi) at San Siro Racecourse in Milano

Three horses have swept the Italian Triple Crown:

- Niccolo dell'Arca – 1941
- Gladiolo – 1946
- Botticelli – in 1954

The Italian Fillies' Triple Crown consists of:

1. Premio Regina Elena (1000 Guineas)
2. Oaks d'Italiano (Italian Oaks)
3. St. Leger Italiano

No filly has swept all three races, but Jacopa de Sellaio won the Premio Parioli, Derby Italiano, Premio Regina Elena, and Oaks d'Italia in 1932.

== Uruguay ==
The three races that compose the Triple Crown in Uruguay are:

1. Gran Premio Polla de Potrillos, run over 1600 metres (0.99 mi) on a dirt track
2. Gran Premio Jockey Club, run over 2000 metres (1.2 mi) on a dirt track
3. Gran Premio Nacional, run over 2500 metres (1.6 mi) on a dirt track

This combination of races received some publicity outside of Uruguay in 2006. The 2005 Triple Crown winner Invasor, after being sold to Sheik Hamdan bin Rashid Al Maktoum's Shadwell Racing and sent to be raced in the United States, went on to win three Grade I races in 2006 before winning that year's Breeders' Cup Classic. He finished the year as the top-ranked horse in the 2006 World Thoroughbred Racehorse Rankings, and won the 2007 Dubai World Cup before being retired to stud following a training injury.

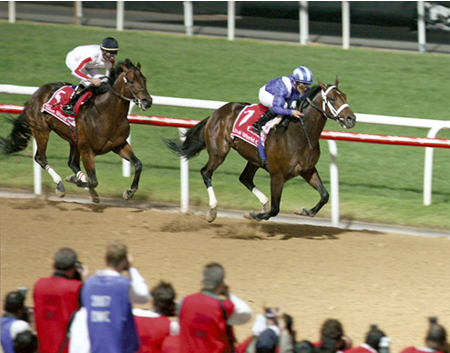
Invasor, winner of the Uruguayan Triple Crown in 2005

Uruguayan Triple Crown winners are:

- Ricaurte – 1913
- Benz – 1917
- Liniers – 1919
- Sisley – 1923
- Lancier – 1926
- Marquito – 1927
- Zorzalero – 1932
- Romántico – 1936
- Lord Coty – 1943
- Luzeiro – 1949
- Bizancio – 1951
- Scooter – 1954
- Zumbador – 1960
- Locoloco – 1962
- Chocon – 1971
- Hampstead – 1977
- Monacilio – 1980
- Amodeo – 1988
- Parsiphal – 1994
- Invasor – 2005
- Sir Fever – 2014
- Suablenanav TH – 2024

The Uruguayan Filly Triple Crown consists of:

1. Gran Premio Polla de Potrancas, run over 1600 metres (0.99 mi) on a dirt track
2. Gran Premio Jockey Club
3. Gran Premio Nacional

Uruguayan Filly Triple Crown winners are:

- Verona – 1915

== South Africa ==
The South African Triple Crown consists of:

1. Gauteng Guineas, run over 1600 metres (0.99 mi)
2. South African Classic, run over 1800 metres (1.1 mi)
3. South African Derby, run over 2450 metres (1.52 mi)

All of these races are run on a turf track at Turffontein Racecourse.

The Cape Guineas, run over 1600 metres (0.99 mi) on a turf track at Kenilworth Racecourse is considered an alternate first leg.

South African Triple Crown winners are:

- Horse Chestnut – 1999
- Louis the King – 2014
- Abashiri – 2016
- Malmoos – 2021

The South African Filly Triple Crown consists of:

1. Gauteng Fillies Guineas, run over 1600 metres (0.99 mi)
2. South African Fillies Classic, run over 1800 metres (1.1 mi)
3. South African Oaks, run over 2450 metres (1.52 mi)

South African Filly Triple Crown winners are:

- Igugu – 2011
- Cherry On The Top – 2013
- Summer Pudding – 2020
- War Of Athena – 2021
- Rain In Holland – 2022

== Zimbabwe ==
The Zimbabwean Triple Crown consists of:

1. Zimbabwe Guineas, run over 1600 metres (0.99 mi)
2. Zimbabwe 2000, run over 2000 metres (1.2 mi)
3. Zimbabwe Derby, run over 2400 metres (1.5 mi)

All of these races are run on a turf track at Borrowdale Park

Zimbabwean Triple Crown winners are:

- Island Farewell – 1983
- Match Winner – 1986
- Stay Alert – 1995
- Summer Silence – 1997
- Glen Monarch – 2006
- Earl Of Surrey – 2007
- Rebecca's Fleet – 2009
- Madigan – 2012

== Other Triple Crowns in European countries ==
=== Belgium ===
The Belgian Triple Crown consists of:

1. Poule d'Essai des Poulains (Belgian 2000 Guineas)
2. Derby Belge
3. St. Leger Belge

Known Triple Crown winners in Belgium are:

- Kitty – 1926
- Bayeux – 1947
- Soudard – 1971
- Epsiba – 1980
- Camiros – 1982
- Abbey's Grey – 1989
- Super Native – 1990

The Fillies' Triple Crown in Belgium consists of:

1. Poule d'Essai des Pouliches (Belgian 1000 Guineas)
2. Prix de Gustave Roy de Blicquy (Belgian Oaks)
3. St. Leger Belge

One filly is known to have won all three races:

- Domitillia – 1959

=== Hungary ===
The Hungarian Triple Crown consists of:

1. Nemzeti dij (Hungarian 2000 Guineas)
2. Magyar Derby (Hungarian Derby)
3. Magyar St. Leger (Hungarian St. Leger)

Hungarian Triple Crown winners are:

- Try Well – 1936
- Bilbao – 1977
- April Sun – 1999
- Saldenzar – 2007
- Quelindo – 2015

The Hungarian Fillies' Triple Crown (not officially listed by the Hungarian racing authorities) consists of:

1. Hazafi dij (Hungarian 1000 Guineas)
2. Magyar Kancadíj (Hungarian Oaks)
3. Magyar St. Leger (Hungarian St. Leger)

No filly has swept the Hungarian Fillies' Triple Crown.

=== Switzerland ===
In Switzerland, the Triple Crown series consists of:

1. Swiss Derby (2400 metres, turf, Frauenfeld)
2. Swiss 2000 Guineas (1600 metres, turf, at Zurich)
3. Swiss St. Leger

The Swiss Fillies Triple Crown consists of:

1. Swiss Oaks
2. Swiss 1000 Guineas (1600 metres, turf)
3. Swiss St. Leger

One horse has won the Swiss Triple Crown.

- Majofils – 2006

=== Denmark ===
In Denmark, the Triple Crown series consists of:

1. Dansk Derby
2. Dansk Forarslob (Danish 2000 Guineas)
3. Dansk St. Leger

Three horses have won the Danish Triple Crown:

- Sunbeam – 1939
- Asa Thor – 1945
- Hallo – 1946

The Danish Filly Triple Crown consists of:

1. Dansk Oaks
2. Marowinalob (Danish1000 Guineas)
3. Dansk St. Leger

One filly has swept all three races:

- Rossard – 1983

Rossard was one of the most successful runners in Denmark's history, being a Grade One winner in the US. She later became a good broodmare, with her son Unusual Heat being a leading sire in California.

=== Russia ===
The Russian Triple Crown differs from other Triple Crowns in a major way by instead having its three jewels be spread out over three years. The Triple Crown consists of:

1. Grand Prize (1600m for 2-year-olds)
2. Grand All Russian Derby (2400m for 3-year-olds)
3. Prize of the Minister of Agriculture (3200m for 4-year-olds)

Currently only three horses have won this version of the Triple Crown

- Budynok – 1930
- Grog II – 1950
- Anilin – 1965

There is a traditional 3-year-old triple crown in Russia modeled after the English Triple Crown but no horse has ever won all three races. Winning it would require:

1. Grand Summer Prize (1600m Russian 2,000 Guineas)
2. Grand All Russian Derby (2400m)
3. S.M. Budyonny Prize (2800m Russian St.Leger)

=== Sweden ===
The Swedish Triple Crown consists of:

1. Svenskt Derby
2. Jockeyklubbens Jubileumslöpning (Swedish Two Thousand Guineas)
3. Svenskt St. Leger

Three horses have swept the Swedish Triple Crown:

- Birgit – 1940
- Coast Guard – 1952
- Homosassa – 1985

The Swedish Filly Triple Crown consists of:

1. Dianalöpning (Swedish One Thousand Guineas)
2. Svensk Oaks
3. Svenskt St. Leger

One filly has swept all three races:

- Wonderbird – 1953

=== Norway ===
The Norwegian Triple Crown series consists of:

1. Norsk 2000 Guineas
2. Norsk Derby
3. Norsk St. Leger

Eight horses have swept the Norwegian Triple Crown:

- Cato – 1943
- Sally – 1944
- Primadonna – 1945
- Askepot – 1948
- Trainer's Seat – 1976
- Dalby Jaguar – 1981
- Sunorius – 1987
- Without Fear – 2011
- Privilegiado – 2019

The Norwegian Filly Triple Crown consists of:

1. Norsk 1000 Guineas
2. Norsk Oaks
3. Norsk St. Leger

No filly has won all three races.

=== The Netherlands ===
The Dutch Triple Crown consists of:

1. Hengsten Productenren (Dutch 2000 Guineas)
2. Dutch Derby
3. Dutch St. Leger

The following horses have won the Dutch Triple Crown:

- Tosto – in 1951
- Sans Valeur – 1954
- Jolly Peter – 1959
- Jolly Jinks – 1966
- Frances Hope – 1976
- Ishamo – 1981
- Boxberger Speed – 1982
- Boxberger Civano – 1984
- Sydney Raaphorst – 1985
- Double Fun – 2002

The Dutch Fillies' Triple Crown consists of:

1. Merries Productenren (Dutch 1000 Guineas)
2. Diana-prijs (Dutch Oaks)
3. Dutch St. Leger

The following horses have swept the series:

- Ramana – 1947
- Qualissa – 1949 (also won the Dutch Derby)
- Que Sara – 1967
- Queen of Roses S – 1973 (also won the Dutch Derby)
- Libelle – 1980
- Carmona – 1983

The Dutch Triple Crown races, except the Dutch Derby and possibly the Dutch Oaks, have not been run since around 2008.

=== Turkey ===
The Turkish Triple Crown consists of:

1. Erkek Tay Deneme (Turkish 2000 Guineas – 1,600 m) or Dişi Tay Deneme (Turkish 1000 Guineas - 1,600 m)
2. Gazi Derby (Turkish Derby – 2,400 m)
3. Ankara Stakes (Turkish St. Leger – 2,800 m)

Champions of the Turkish Triple Crown are:

- Sadettin – 1970
- Karayel – 1973
- Seren.1 – 1983
- Ugurtay – 1985
- Hafız – 1986
- Bold Pilot – 1996
- Grand Ekinoks – 2001

The Turkish Fillies' Triple Crown (not officially recognized by Turkish racing authorities) consists of:

1. Dişi Tay Deneme (Turkish 1000 Guineas)
2. Kısrak (Turkish Oaks)
3. Ankara Stakes (Turkish St. Leger)

Fillies that have swept this series are:

- Suphan – 1965
- Minimo – 1971 (also won the Turkish Derby)

=== Spain ===
The Spanish Triple Crown series consists of:

1. Premio Cimera (Spanish 2000 Guineas)
2. Premio Villapadierna (Spanish Derby)
3. Premio Villamejor (Spanish St. Leger)

Two horses have swept the Spanish Triple Crown:

- Dual Sea – 1975
- Arkaitz – in 2014

The Triple Crown for fillies consists of:

1. Premio Valderas (Spanish 1000 Guineas)
2. Premio Beamonte (Spanish Oaks)
3. Premio Villamejor (Spanish St. Leger)

One filly has swept all three races:

- Tokara – 1962

=== Poland ===
In Poland, the Triple Crown (Potrójna korona) consists of:

1. Nagroda Rulera, Polish 2000 Guineas, Warsaw, 1600 m
2. Służewiec Derby, Polish Derby, Warsaw, 2400 m
3. Nagroda St. Leger, Warsaw, 2800 m

Known Polish Triple Crown winners are:

- Liège – 1917
- Mat – 1934
- Jeremi – 1938
- Ruch – 1948
- Solali – 1961
- Dipol – 1972
- Czerkies – 1974
- Krezus – 1989
- Mokosz – 1992
- Dżamajka (filly) – 2000
- Dancer Life – 2002
- Dżesmin – 2005
- San Moritz – 2007
- Intens – 2011
- Va Bank – 2015
- Bush Brave – 2017
- Fabulous Las Vegas – 2018

The classic races for fillies are:

1. Nagroda Wiosennej (1000 Guineas)
2. Nagroda Liry (Oaks)

No filly is known to have won the Polish Fillies' Triple Crown, which would conclude with the St. Leger. The Polish St. Leger is now open to 3-year-olds and up.

=== Czechia ===
In Czechia, the Triple Crown (Klasická trojkoruna) consists of

- Velká Jarní Cena (The Great Spring Prize, 1600 m)
- České Derby, (Czech Derby, 2400 m)
- Czech St. Leger, 2800 m

All three jewels are held at Prague-Velká Chuchle Racecourse currently seven horses have won this Triple Crown

- Panoš – 1947
- Symbol – 1954
- Blyskač – 1956
- Arva – 1988 (filly)
- Glowing (FR) – 1996
- Tribal Instinct (IRE) – 2001
- Age Of Jape (POL) – 2009

== Triple Crowns in other countries ==
=== India ===
The Indian Triple Crown consists of:

1. Indian 2000 Guineas
2. Indian Derby
3. Indian St. Leger

All three races are run at Mahalaxmi Racecourse in Mumbai. The St. Leger was run at Pune between 1970 and 1990, before being shifted to Mumbai. It is now again being run in Pune.

Ten horses have won the Indian Triple Crown:

- Commoner – 1953/54
- Loyal Manzar – 1961/62
- Prince Pradeep – 1963/64
- Red Rufus – 1966/67
- Our Select – 1967/68
- Squanderer – 1976/77
- Almanac – 1981/82
- Astonish – 1991/92
- Indictment – 1997/98
- Smart Chieftain – 1999/00

The Indian Fillies Triple Crown consists of:

1. Indian 1000 Guineas
2. Indian Oaks
3. Indian St. Leger

One filly has swept the series for fillies:

- Her Majesty – 1947/48

=== Kenya ===
The Kenya Triple Crown series is run at Ngong Racecourse, in Nairobi, and consists of:

1. Kenya Derby (1 1/2 miles)
2. Kenya Guineas (1 mile)
3. Kenya St. Leger (1 3/4 miles)

The three races have been won by:

- Heron – 1972
- Manuscript – 1978
- Pretty Witch (filly) – 1981
- Morningstar – 1990
- Kings Pattern – 1994
- Hawker Fury – 2017
- Silverstone Air – 2019
- Sheriff John Stone – 2025

The Kenya Fillies' Triple Crown consists of:

1. Kenya Fillies Guineas (1 mile)
2. Kenya Oaks (1 1/2 miles)
3. Kenya St. Leger (1 3/4 miles)

The three races have been won by:

- Windsong – 1999
- Happy Times – 2015
- Western Ballad – 2016

=== Macau ===
In Macau, the Macau Jockey Club introduced the Triple Crown Series in 2008, with three races all held in Taipa Racecourse, Macau:

1. Director's Cup, Macau Group 2 Race, 1,500 metres (0.93 mi)
2. Macau Cup, Macau Group 2 Race, 1,500 metres (0.93 mi)
3. Macau Gold Cup, Macau Group 1 Race, 1,800 metres (1.1 mi)

In 2009 Macau Jockey Club changed the series for 4-year-old horses:

1. Macau Guineas, Macau Group 1 Race, 1,500 metres (0.93 mi), only for 4-year-old horses
2. Macau Derby, Macau Group 1 Race, 1,800 metres (1.1 mi), only for 4-year-old horses
3. Macau Gold Cup, Macau Group 1 Race, 1,800 metres (1.1 mi)

In 2010, Luen Yat Forever became the first and, before the Macau Jockey Club stopped holding races from 31 March 2024, the only horse to win the Macau Triple Crown.

=== Barbados ===
The Barbados Triple Crown of Thoroughbred Racing is a series of thoroughbred horse races run annually at Garrison Savannah Racetrack near Bridgetown, Barbados, consisting of races of increasing distance:

1. Barbados Guineas
2. Midsummer Creole Classic
3. Barbados Derby

The winners of the Barbados Triple Crown have been:

- Watermeet (filly) – 1973
- Ginger Lilly (filly) – 1980
- Coo-Bird – 1989
- Incitatus – 1996
- Zouk (filly) – 2006
- Areutalkintome – 2009
- People's champ – 2021
- Hurricane – 2022

=== Dominican Republic ===
The three races that compose the Triple Crown in the Dominican Republic are:

1. Clásico Matías Ramón Mella
2. Clásico Francisco del Rosario Sanchez
3. Clásico Juan Pablo Duarte

The winners of the Dominican Republic Triple Crown have been:

- Cibao – 1979
- Amor Mio – 1980
- Senorita Cuquina – 1982
- Dr. Calderon – 1985
- Candice Akemi – 1990
- J. Robert – 1991
- Sweet Honey – 1997
- Excelencia – 2005
- Matty Alou – 2007
- Sicótico – 2008
- Fratello Martino – 2015
- Tango Dancer – 2016
- Inmenso – 2017
- Cadeau de Alcalá – 2019
- Huracán P. – 2020

=== Jamaica ===
The Jamaican Triple Crown series at Caymanas Park consists of:

1. Jamaican 2000 Guineas
2. Jamaican Derby
3. Jamaican St. Leger

The winners of the Jamaican Triple Crown are:

- Royal Dad – 1981
- Monday Morning – 1987
- Lui Chie Pooh – 1988
- The Viceroy – 1989
- Milligram – 1992
- War Zone – 1996
- I'm Satisfied – 2000
- Simply Magic – 2002
- Mark My Words – 2010
- She's a Maneater – 2017
- Supreme Soul – 2019

The Jamaican Fillies' Triple Crown at Caymanas Park consists of:

1. Jamaican 1000 Guineas
2. Jamaican Oaks
3. Jamaican St. Leger

The winners of the Jamaican Fillies' Triple Crown are:

- Vestia – 1993
- Alsafra – 2008

=== Panama ===
The Panamanian Triple Crown consists of:

1. Arturo, Eric Arturo & Eric Arturo Delvalle, 1 1/8 miles on dirt
2. Augosto Samuel Boyd Paredes, 1 1/8 miles on dirt
3. Carlos y Fernando Eleta Almaran, 1 1/8 miles on dirt

All of the races are conducted at the Hipódromo Presidente Remon

The winners of the Panamanian Triple Crown have been:

- Pindín – 1964
- Tojo – 1966
- Iván – 1967
- Eugenio – 1972
- Montecarlo – 1973
- El Manut – 1976
- El Gran Capo – 1978
- Leonardo – 1992
- El Chacal – 1994
- Rey Arturo – 1995
- Evaristo – 1998
- Spago – 2004
- Oxsai – 2008
- Voy Porque Voy – 2010
- Señor Concerto – 2019

The Panamanian Filly Triple Crown consists of:

1. Temistocles Diaz Q., 1 1/16 miles on dirt
2. Tomás G. Duque y Tomás A. Duque, 1 1/16 miles on dirt
3. Raúl (Lul) Arango, Raúl (Baby) Arango, y Roberto (Bob) Arango Chiari, 1 1/16 miles on dirt

Winners of the Panamanian Filly Triple Crown include:

- Monkey Business – 2015
- Chantik – 2016
- Lady Valery – 2017

=== Puerto Rico ===
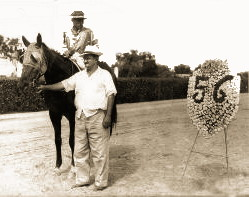
Camarero, winner of 56 consecutive races and the Triple Crown

The Triple Crown series at Puerto Rico's Camarero Racetrack consists of three races at increasingly longer distances. They are:

1. Derby Puertorriqueño at 1,700 metres (8½ furlongs) held in the first Sunday of May
2. Copa Gobernador at 1,800 metres (9 furlongs) held in the end of May
3. Copa San Juan at 1,900 metres (9½ furlongs) held in the last Sunday of June

The Puerto Rico Triple Crown winners are:

- Camarero – 1954
- Cardiologo – 1961
- El Rebelde – 1966
- Hurley Road – 1981
- Vuelve Candy B – 1991
- Cherokee Pepper – 1999
- Estrellero – 2001
- Mediavilla R – 2002
- Don Paco – 2011
- Arquitecto – 2012
- Lluvia de Nieve – 2014
- Justiciero – 2017
- Ledoux – 2019
- Consolador – 2021

=== Ecuador ===
1980 – present

Ecuador has two sets of races referred to as Triple Crowns:

Ecuador Triple Crown

1. Clásico Estreno Dr. Raúl Lebed Sigall, at Hipódromo BUIJO in Samborondón
2. Clásico Polla Nacional Sr. Agustin Febres Cordero, at Hipódromo BUIJO in Samborondón
3. Clásico Derby Nacional Sr.Benjamin Rosales A., at Hipódromo BUIJO in Samborondón

Ecuador Fillies' Triple Crown

1. Clásico Ing. Carlos San Andres, at Hipódromo BUIJO in Samborondo
2. Clásico Sr. Eduardo Jairala F, at Hipódromo BUIJO in Samborondó
3. Clásico Abogado Carlos Julio Arosemena Peet, at Hipódromo BUIJO in Samborondón

Pre-1980

In Ecuador, the Triple Crown consists of:

1. Clásico Nelson Uraga Suarez, at Hipódromo Santa Cecilia in Guayaquil
2. Clásico Enrique Guzman Aspiazu, at Hipódromo Santa Cecilia in Guayaquil
3. Clásico Inginiero Ignacio De Icaza Aspiazu, at Hipódromo Santa Cecilia in Guayaquil

Winners of the Ecuadoran Triple Crown are:

- Banantia – 1962
- Miss Flora – 1963
- Capo Di Monte II – 1965
- Alcatraz – 1967
- Pechiche – 1970
- Farsante – 1971
- Baby – 1973
- Doña Maruja – 1976
- White Derby – 1977
- Satisfacción – 1978
- Soberano – 1979
- Dictador – 1982
- Cayuga – 1984
- British Pride – 1985
- Profecía – 1986
- John's Secret – 1987
- Kremlin – 1993
- Serious Secret – 1995
- Gacelita – 1996
- Terminator – 1997
- Señorita – 1998
- Nicotina – 2001
- Macanudo – 2003
- Gran Cacao – 2004
- Vanessa Wins – 2010
- Manzur Manzur – 2011
- Vengo Del Aire – 2014
- Gitana Fiel – 2020
- Saturday – 2023

=== Venezuela ===
Venezuela has two sets of races referred to as Triple Crowns.

The Venezuelan Official Triple Crown consists of:

1. Clásico José Antonio Páez, at Hipódromo La Rinconada in Caracas 1600m
2. Clásico Cría Nacional (former Clásico Ministerio de Agricultura y Cría), at Hipódromo La Rinconada in Caracas 2000m
3. Clásico República de Venezuela (Venezuelan Derby), at Hipódromo La Rinconada in Caracas 2400m

Winners of the Venezuelan Triple Crown, since 1956, are:

- Gradisco – 1960
- El Corsario – 1972
- Iraquí – 1985
- Catire Bello – 1992
- Polo Grounds – 2005
- Taconeo – 2007
- El Gran Cesar – 2008
- Water Jet – 2010
- Raffsttar – 2020

The Venezuelan Fillies' Triple Crown consists of:

1. Clásico Hipódromo La Rinconada, at Hipódromo La Rinconada in Caracas 1600m
2. Clásico Prensa Hípica Nacional, at Hipódromo La Rinconada in Caracas 2000m
3. Clásico General Joaquín Crespo, at Hipódromo La Rinconada in Caracas 2400m

Filly Triple Crown winners are:

- Lavandera – 1971
- Segula C. – 1974
- Blondy – 1978
- Gelinotte – 1980
- Lady and Me – 1991
- Cantaura – 1992
- Miss Marena – 1994
- Starship Miss – 1999
- Front Stage – 2000
- Bambera – 2009
- Ninfa del Cielo – 2014
- Afrodita de Padua – 2019
- Sandovalera – 2021

=== Indonesia ===
The Indonesian Triple Crown consists of

1. Tiga Mahkota Series 1, Dirt 1200m
2. Tiga Mahkota Series 2, Dirt 1600m
3. Indonesia Derby, Dirt 2000m

Indonesian Triple Crown winners are:

- Mystere (colt) – 1978 (Note: Largely uncited due to the discontinuation of Indonesia Triple Crown from 1979.)
- Manik Trisula (filly) – 2002
- Djohar Manik (filly) – 2014
- King Argentin (colt) – 2025

Note that thoroughbred horses are not eligible to run at the Indonesian Triple Crown, since the event is limited to only local breeds like Sandalwood Pony, crossbreeds (known locally as G Horses), or Kuda Pacu Indonesia/KPI (crosses between crossbreeds). No Triple Crown for thoroughbred racing is organized by PORDASI, as races exclusively for thoroughbreds are only held in two non-derby classes.

=== Philippines ===
The Triple Crown Stakes backed by the Philippine Racing Commission (Philracom). It was first organized in 1978, but a horse did not sweep all three races until 1981, when Fair and Square achieved that feat, becoming the series' first Triple Crown champion.

The races are held at various venues throughout its history. The first two legs of the series have traditionally been referred to as the Cojuangco Cup and the J.V. Ongpin Cup, respectively, while the final leg has been known as the Horseman's Cup. However, recent editions commonly refer to the races simply by their order as legs of the Triple Crown series.

Its winners include:

- Fair and Square – 1981
- Skywalker – 1983
- Time Master – 1987
- Magic Showtime – 1988
- Sun Dancer – 1989
- Strong Material – 1996
- Real Top – 1998
- Silver Story – 2001
- Hagdang Bato – 2012
- Kid Molave – 2014
- Sepfourteen – 2017
- Heneral Kalentong – 2020

In 2025, the Metro Manila Turf Club introduced two new Triple Crown‑style stakes races: the Prince Cup and the King's Gold Cup. Each tournament consists of three legs and is restricted to horses foaled outside the Philippines. The first editions are still ongoing and hence no horse has made a sweep in either tournaments.

=== Malaysia ===
In Malaysia the Selangor Jockey Club introduced the Triple Crown Series in 2003, with three races all held at Selangor Turf Club, Malaysia: The Selnagor Turf Club Triple Crown Series consists of three races at increasingly longer distances. Unlike most other Triple Crown events, these races are not confined to three-year-olds.

The Selnagor Turf Club Triple Crown Consists of

1. Tunku Gold Cup (1200m)
2. Selangor Gold Cup (1600m)
3. Piala Emas Sultan Selangor (2000m)

Currently no horse has won all three races. The closest any horse has gotten was Superb Classic who won the Tunku Gold Cup and Selangor Gold Cup in 2005, and Cheval Blanc who won the Tunku Gold Cup and Piala Emas Sultan Selangor in 2024.

=== Trinidad and Tobago ===
The three races that compose the triple crown of Trinidad and Tobago were established in 1983 and they are:

1. Easter Guineas
2. Midsummer Classic Stakes
3. Trinidad Derby

The Trinidad and Tobago triple crown winners are

Pre 1983:

- Bright Light – 1952
- Darjeeling – 1954
- Shalimar – 1958
- Happy Landing – 1960
- Aurelian – 1963
- Chip Chip – 1967
- Royal Colours – 1982

After 1983:

- Sky Rocket – 1986
- Carnival Messiah – 2001
- Momentum – 2014
- Wise Guy – 2020
- In The Headlines – 2023
- Headliner – 2025

== Undefeated Triple Crown winners ==
The following horses won their Triple Crown when still undefeated. Those marked with an asterisk retired undefeated.

- Ormonde* (1886), United Kingdom
- Isinglass (1893), United Kingdom
- Old Man (1904), Argentina
- Botafogo (1917), Argentina
- Bahram* (1935), United Kingdom
- Embrujo (1939), Argentina
- Windsor Slipper* (1942), Ireland
- Yatasto (1951), Argentina
- Camarero (1954), Puerto Rico
- Manantial* (1958), Argentina
- Gradisco (1960), Venezuela
- Forli (1966), Argentina
- Nijinsky (1970), United Kingdom
- Karayel* (1973), Turkey
- Emerald Hill (1977), Brazil
- Seattle Slew (1977), United States
- El Gran Capo (1978), Panama
- Pikotazo (1980), Mexico
- Royal Dad (1981), Jamaica
- Symboli Rudolf (1984), Japan
- Itajara* (1987), Brazil
- Wolf (1990/91), Chile
- Terminator (1997), Ecuador
- Virginie (1997), Brazil
- Grozny (1998), Peru
- Toshin Blizzard (2001), Japan
- Excelencia (2005), Dominican Republic
- Deep Impact (2005), Japan
- Invasor (2005), Uruguay
- Water Jet (2010), Venezuela
- Hagdang Bato (2012), Philippines
- Fixador (2013), Brazil
- Va Bank (2015), Poland
- Justify*† (2018), United States
- Kukulkan (2018), Mexico
- Contrail (2020), Japan
- Daring Tact (2020), Japan
- Mick Fire (2023), Japan
- Toy Soltero (2023), Chile
- In The Headlines (2023), Trinidad
- Kay Army (2023/24), Chile
- Headliner (2025), Trinidad

†Although Justify finished first in all of his races, litigation filed by the owners of Bolt d'Oro in 2020 called for Justify's disqualification from the 2018 Santa Anita Derby over a positive drug test for scopolamine, a known environmental contaminant. A Los Angeles County Superior Court judge ordered Justify's disqualification, for which Justify's connections have filed an appeal. The appeal is pending.

== Individual Triple Crown winners ==
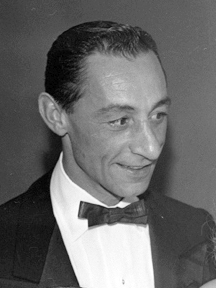
Eddie Arcaro, winner of the American Triple Crown twice

Only three jockeys have won the Triple Crown with different horses (i.e., rode horses to Triple Crowns in different years):

- Steve Donoghue (United Kingdom : 1915, Pommem; 1917 Gay Crusader)
- Eddie Arcaro (United States: 1941, Whirlaway; 1948, Citation)
- Emisael Jaramillo (Venezuela: 2005, Polo Grounds; 2007, Taconeo; 2010, Water Jet)

At least two jockeys is known to have won all three of a country's Triple Crown races in the same year on different horses:

- Luis Contreras (Canada, 2011: Queen's Plate, Inglorious; Prince of Wales Stakes and Breeders' Stakes, Pender Harbour)
- Alfredo García Paduani (Venezuela, 2016: Clásico José Antonio Páez and Clásico Cría Nacional, Ocean Bay; Clásico República Bolivariana de Venezuela, Gran Will)

One trainer is known to have accomplished the same feat as Contreras and García Paduani:

- D. Wayne Lukas (USA, 1995: Kentucky Derby, Thunder Gulch; Preakness Stakes, Timber Country; Belmont Stakes, Thunder Gulch)

== Back to back Triple Crown winners (jockeys) ==
Don Seymour (Canada)

- 1989 – With Approval
- 1990 – Izvestia

Javier Santiago (Puerto Rico)

- 2001 – Estrellero
- 2002 – Mediavilla R

James McDonald ( Australia )

- 2025 Voyage Bubble
- 2026 Romantic Warrior

== Most Triple Crown winners (jockeys) ==
Winston Grifiths – Jamaica (5)

- 1981 – Royal Dad
- 1988 – Liu Chie Poo
- 1992 – Milligram
- 2001 – I'msatisfied
- 2002 – Simply Magic (filly)

Alexis Feliciano – Puerto Rico (3)

- 1991 – Vuelve Candy B
- 1999 – Cherokee Pepper
- 2011 – Don Paco

Emisael Jaramillo – Venezuela (3)

- 2005 – Polo Grounds
- 2007 – Taconeo
- 2010 – Water Jet

James McDonald (jockey) - Australia (3)

- 2012 Dundeel Australia
- 2025 Voyage Bubble Hong Kong
- 2026 Romantic Warrior Hong Kong

== See also ==
- List of leading Thoroughbred racehorses
