= Emerald Hill =

Emerald Hill may refer to:

- Emerald Hill, Victoria or South Melbourne, a suburb of Melbourne, Victoria, Australia
- Emerald Hill, New Zealand, a suburb of Upper Hutt, New Zealand
- Emerald Hill, Singapore
  - Emerald Hill - The Little Nyonya Story, a Singaporean drama series of the same name
- Emerald Hill, Zimbabwe, a suburb in Harare, Zimbabwe
  - Emerald Hill School, Zimbabwe, a school for deaf children in Harare, Zimbabwe
  - Emerald Hill Children's Home, Zimbabwe, an orphanage in Harare, Zimbabwe
- Emerald Hill (Clarksville, Tennessee), a mansion listed on the US National Register of Historic Places
- Emerald Hills, San Diego, California, U.S.
- Emerald Hill Zone, a level in the 1992 video game Sonic the Hedgehog 2
- Emerald Hill (horse), a Brazilian racehorse
