= Headliner (horse) =

Trinidadian racehorse

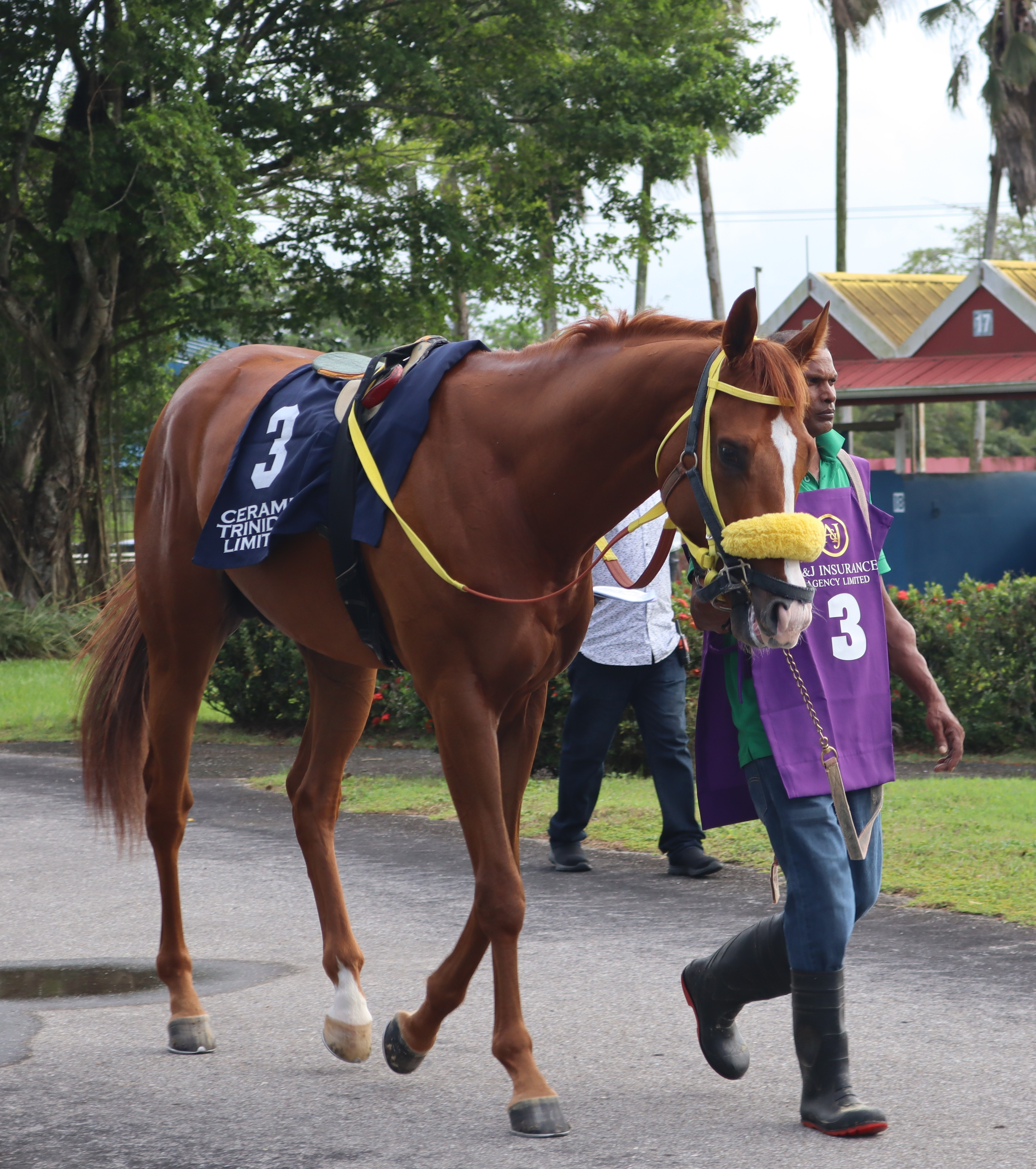
- Sire: Headline News
- Grandsire: Silver Train
- Dam: B's Passion
- Damsire: Precise Sweep
- Sex: Colt
- Foaled: 17 March 2022
- Country: Trinidad
- Colour: Chestnut
- Breeder: Mrs. Diane Scott
- Owner: Mrs. Diane Scott
- Trainer: John O'Brien
- Record: 11:8-1-0
- Earnings: TT ~$285,598.00

Major wins
- First Citizens Juvenile Championship (2024); Chief Commander Classic (2025); Champagne Stakes (2026); President's Cup (2026); Independence Cup (2026); Trinidadian Classic Races wins: Guineas (2025); Midsummer Classic (2025); Trinidad Derby (2025)

Awards
- 13th Trinidadian Triple Crown Champion (2025)

Headliner (foaled March 17, 2022) is an active Thoroughbred racehorse, best known for winning the Trinidadian Triple Crown in 2025. He was undefeated for two starts in 2024, including the Grade 2 First Citizens Juvenile Championship. He maintained his winning streak for five more starts during 2025, consecutively winning three Grade 1 races in the Guineas, Midsummer Classic, and Trinidad Derby, completing the Trinidadian Triple Crown while undefeated.

== Background ==
Headliner is a chestnut colt with a white star and strip that widens to the left side of his nose. He has one white pastern on his back left leg. He races in the Canary colors of his owner, Diane Scott, and is trained by John O'Brien.

Headliner's sire, Headline News, is notable for defeating multiple time Jamaican Horse of the Year Bigman In Town twice, once in the Gold Cup Grade 1 and once in the Starlight Stakes; Headline News also won another Grade 1 in the 2014 Champagne Stakes. Headline News is sired by Silver Train, a Breeders' Cup Sprint (2005) winner. Headline News' other notable progeny include Making Headlines, In The Headlines, and Headlines Again; Headliner's full sister, In The Headlines, also completed the Triple Crown two years prior in 2023, being similarly undefeated during the achievement.

Headliner's dam, B's Passion, won the graded Oaks Stakes and Royal Colours Classic, being Grade 2 and Grade 3 events respectively. She is sired by Precise Sweep, a son of End Sweep, a successful American sire who won the Jersey Shore Breeders' Cup Stakes in 1994.

== Racing career ==
=== 2024: Two-year-old Season ===
On November 30th, 2024, Headliner debuted with The Native Bred 3 Y.O Maidens, at Arima Race course, covering 1100 meters. Jockeyed by Dillon Khelawan, Headliner was out of the gate slow, but won by a length. His next race was the 1350 meter Grade 2 First Citizens Juvenile Championship on December 26th, 2024. He was once again ridden by Khelawan, and won by two and a half lengths.

=== 2025: Three-year-old Season ===
His first race of the year was with a 2,000 meter modified benchmark on January 25th. Headliner led the pack until the end, leading by six lengths, but ultimately finishing by four. After his three-year-old debut, he was onto the 1,600 meter Chief Commander Classic on March 29th. He maintained a four length lead throughout the race, winning the race with a four and a third length gap between him and second placer Showtime.

After the Chief Commander Classic, the next goal was the Trinidadian Triple Crown. The first jewel was the Guineas on May 30th, an 1,800 meter race; Starting on the outside in post seven, the final ruling was Headliner first by ten lengths and a third, with Free Pass in second and Valiante in third; The race's final running time was 1:58.10. His jockey, Dillon Khelawan, said about his "exceptional" performance in the Guineas, "I thought that coming to the corner I should expect some challenges but that did not happen, [...] Headliner just kept up the gallop all the way up the straight. That is how classy he is."

On August 1, Headliner ran in the Midsummer Classic, another 1,800 meter race, and the second of the Triple Crown races. 1/9 in the betting, Headliner took first by six and a forth lengths. Following the Midsummer Classic, on September 24th Headliner went on to win the Trinidad Derby, the final leg of the Trinidadian Triple Crown. He finished the race twelve lengths and a half over second place colt Have A Great Day.

Headliner was jockey Khelawan's first Triple Crown success; Khelawan said that the colt had shown "Remarkable improvement", and went on to say he had "Never doubted [Headliner] would win the Triple Crown".

On December 6th Headliner ran in the Stewards Cup, placing second to Hello World by five lengths, making the race his first loss in his career.

=== 2026: Four-year-old Season ===
After his loss at the Stewards Cup, he was entered in for the Grade 1 Gold Cup on December 26th, however he did not show for the race.

Headliner was then transported to Barbados to run in the Grade 1 Tanglewood Stakes & Trophy, arriving in the country on January 23rd. Despite starting strongly, he fell behind as the race continued, and ultimately placed last among the eleven horse field. Headliner's loss in the Tanglewood Stakes was followed by a three-month stay in Barbados, before returning to Trinidad on March 20th.

On April 6th, Headliner was entered to race in the 1,600 meter Champagne Stakes as his return race; He led the race from start to finish, beating six-year-old Gold Cup shower El Chico Malo by a length in the process.

After a win in the Champagne Stakes, Headliner competed in another 1,500 benchmark race. Similar to his performance in the Tanglewood, he started strongly out the gate, was challenged by Sneaky Cheeky into second, lost speed as the race approached the final furlongs, and placed last for a second time in his career.

Headliner returned to racing three weeks later on June 19th, where he ran in the Grade 3 President's Cup; In an improvement from his last start, he won the 1,900 meter race by fourteen and a half lengths, with The Goddess Nike coming in second. He continued on August 31st to win the Grade 1 Independence Cup, returning a month later to secure another benchmark win.

== Racing statistics ==
The data below has been sourced from Trinidad and Tobago Racing Authority, and the Arima Race Club Official Website.

Date	Track	Race	Grade	Distance	HN	Odds	Finish	Time (race time)	Loss Margin (win margin)	Jockey	Winner (Runner-up)
2024 – two-year-old season
Nov 30	Arima	Native Bred 2 Y.O. Maidens		1,100 m	2	1/5	1st	1:09.4	(1)	Dillon Khelawan	(Valiante)
Dec 26	Arima	First Citizens Juvenile Championship	GII	1,350 m	5	1/1	1st	1:25.3	(2½)	Dillon Khelawan	(Marmalade)
2025 – three-year-old season
Jan 25	Arima	Modified Benchmark 3 Y.O. & Over (45-30)		1,500 m	2	1/5	1st	1:36.4	(4)	Dillon Khelawan	(Schwarzenegger)
Mar 29	Arima	Chief Commander Classic	GII	1,600 m	6	1/9	1st	1:39.4	(4¾)	Dillon Khelawan	(Showtime)
May 30	Arima	Guineas	GI	1,800 m	7	1/9	1st	1:58.0	(10¾)	Dillon Khelawan	(Free Pass)
Aug 1	Arima	Midsummer Classic	GI	1,800 m	4	1/9	1st	1:57.4	(6¼)	Dillon Khelawan	(Free Pass)
Sep 24	Arima	Trinidad Derby Stakes	GI	2,000 m	1	1/5	1st	2:09.4	(12½)	Dillon Khelawan	(Have A Great Day)
Dec 6	Arima	Steward's Cup	GI	1,200 m	3	8/5	2nd	(1:12.0)	4¼	Ricky Jadoo	Hello World
2026 – four-year-old season
Feb 7	Barbados Turf	XXIII Tanglewood Stakes & Trophy	GI	2,000 m	6	6/1	11th	(2:09.4)	24½	Arron Daniel	Pussykat
Apr 6	Arima	Champagne Stakes	GIII	1,600 m	2	8/5	1st	1:38.4	(1)	Tristan Phillips	(El Chico Malo)
May 30	Arima	Modified Benchmark 3 Y.O. & Over (70+)		1,500 m	6	1/5	6th	(1:31.1)	2¼	Dillon Khelawan	The Goddess Nike
Jun 19	Arima	President's Cup	GIII	1,900 m	5	3/5	1st	2:00.3	(14½)	Dillon Khelawan	(The Goddess Nike)
Aug 31	Arima	Independance Cup	GI	1,800 m	6	4/5	1st	1:51.2	(DIST)	Nobel Abrego	(Hello World)
Sep 24	Arima	Modified Benchmark 3 Y.O. & Over (70+)		1,350	3	1/2	1st	1:20.4	(4¾)	Dillon Khelawan	(Valiante)

== Pedigree ==
Pedigree of Headliner (TRI), chestnut colt, 2022
Sire Headline News (TRI) b. 2010	Silver Train (USA) dk. b. 2002	Old Trieste (USA)	A.P. Indy (USA)
Sire Headline News (TRI) b. 2010	Silver Train (USA) dk. b. 2002	Old Trieste (USA)	Lovelier Linda (USA)
Sire Headline News (TRI) b. 2010	Silver Train (USA) dk. b. 2002	Ridden In The Stars (USA)	Cormorant (USA)
Sire Headline News (TRI) b. 2010	Silver Train (USA) dk. b. 2002	Ridden In The Stars (USA)	Shelter Strait (USA)
Sire Headline News (TRI) b. 2010	IGOTASPELLONU (USA)	Grand Slam (USA)	Gone West (USA)
Sire Headline News (TRI) b. 2010	IGOTASPELLONU (USA)	Grand Slam (USA)	Bright Candles (USA)
Sire Headline News (TRI) b. 2010	IGOTASPELLONU (USA)	Dutchess Mojo (USA)	Deputy Minister (CAN)
Sire Headline News (TRI) b. 2010	IGOTASPELLONU (USA)	Dutchess Mojo (USA)	Blissful (USA)
Dam B's Passion (TRI) dk. b. 2008	Precise Sweep (USA) dk. b. 1999	End Sweep (USA)	Forty Niner (USA)
Dam B's Passion (TRI) dk. b. 2008	Precise Sweep (USA) dk. b. 1999	End Sweep (USA)	Broom Dance
Dam B's Passion (TRI) dk. b. 2008	Precise Sweep (USA) dk. b. 1999	Precisely (USA)	Summing (USA)
Dam B's Passion (TRI) dk. b. 2008	Precise Sweep (USA) dk. b. 1999	Precisely (USA)	Crisp N' Clear (USA)
Dam B's Passion (TRI) dk. b. 2008	Flying Millie (JAM)	Sir Lal Bahadur (CAN)	Vice Regent (CAN)
Dam B's Passion (TRI) dk. b. 2008	Flying Millie (JAM)	Sir Lal Bahadur (CAN)	Forleana (CAN)
Dam B's Passion (TRI) dk. b. 2008	Flying Millie (JAM)	Flying Mal (USA)	Aeronaut (USA)
Dam B's Passion (TRI) dk. b. 2008	Flying Millie (JAM)	Flying Mal (USA)	My Gal Mal (USA)
