= Royal Colours =

Trinidadian Thoroughbred racehorse

- Sire: Calpurnius
- Grandsire: St.Paddy
- Dam: Baby Princess
- Sex: Stallion
- Foaled: April 17, 1979
- Country: Trinidad And Tobago
- Colour: Chestnut
- Breeder: Alwin Poon Tip and John Sellier
- Owner: Alwin Poon Tip and John Sellier
- Record: 30:11-8-1
- Earnings: TT$384,117

Major wins
- Benson & Hedges Premium Stakes (1981); Challenge Gold Cup (1981); Easter Guineas (1982); Whitsun Classic Stakes (1982); Trinidad Derby (1982); Hopeful Stakes (1982); Black and White Creole Trophy (1982); President's Easter Trophy (1983); International Trust Caribbean Stakes (1983)

Awards
- 7th Trinidadian Triple Crown Winner

Honors
- Royal Colours Classic (G3) at Santa Rosa Park; Racing Hall of Fame of Trinidad & Tobago

Royal Colours (April 17, 1979 – October 1983) is a Thoroughbred racehorse bred in Trinidad and Tobago. He was the winner of the Triple Crown in Trinidad and Tobago in 1982 and is considered by some to be the greatest horse to ever race in Trinidad and Tobago.

== Backgrounds ==
Royal Colours is a Chestnut colt with a blaze going down his face. He had no white markings on his front feet however he has two socks on his hind legs. Both sides of his pedigree come from Great Britain. His sire is Calpurnius a sire with both Bull Lea and Hyperion in his pedigree, and his dam is Baby Princess. Royal Colours was bred in Santa Cruz Valley on the island of Trinidad. He was bred by Alwin Poon Tip and John Sellier who were also co-owners.

== Racing career ==
At the age of 2 Royal Colours was not a particularly amazing racehorse. He wasn't a dominant force but he would manage to run in a handful of stakes races that year. He would have a few very tough defeats in stakes races mainly a second-place finish behind Mercurius. He was also second place in the Nursery Stakes to Search Part. But he was still able to win stakes races taking the Benson & Hedges Premium Stakes. As well as the Challenge Gold Cup managing to very game victory by holding off the late-charging Miss Amity.

=== Trinidadian Triple Crown ===
At the age of 3, he didn't start super promisingly with 2 defeats including finishing 8th 16 lengths behind the winner. Despite this, he would prove he had potential when racing against older horses in lower company at 1400 meters. In the race, he would come flying late to get up in the final strides to win the race over Acabar who was carrying 8.5 kilograms more than him during the race.

Things would get more difficult after that as he would then run in the first jewel of the Trinidadian Triple Crown the Easter Guineas. The race would be packed full of difficult horses including his old rival at the age of 2 Mercurius who was considered the best 2-year-old the previous year. Even so, the race was going to be a difficult one for all of them as the race was a huge field of 17 horses total. The gates opened and one of the other runners Sailing Home threw off his rider at the start. Almost immediately the field of horses jostled for position with Royal Colors putting himself right behind the front runners closely behind Mercurius who took up a similar position. Shortly after the first turn, another horse throws off his rider by bolting to the outside. Mercurius was just ahead of Royal Colours but with about 600 meters to go Mercurius makes his move and takes over the lead. Royal Colours follows right behind making sure to not let Mercurius get too far ahead. But by the far turn Royal Colours took the lead and opened up 10 lengths in the stretch. Following his win in the first jewel, he would continue his success with a win in the second jewel by 3 1/2 lengths as well as sandwiching in the Trial Stakes by 5 lengths.

Those 2 races would be his preps for the final jewel of the Triple Crown the Trinidad Derby. The race began and with Roman Way setting the pace early as they went around the first turn quickly. However, this didn't last long as Casanova took the lead from him and began to open up but Royal Colours moved as well and by the far turn, it turned into a 2 horse race. The two battled down the stretch head and head neither giving an inch until the final 100 meters when Royal Colours gained the advantage opening up 3/4ths of a length at the last moment.

=== Rest of career ===
Following his triple crown victory, he would then attempt a 5th straight classic race the Hopeful Stakes. In a surprise, Royal Colours took the lead and set it for most of the race. He leads around the first turn and around the backstretch and into the homestretch. He kept the lead but then in the final turn Cassanova took over sneaking up on the inside to take the lead by half a length. But there was still a good amount of stretch left with all his heart Royal Colours repelled Cassanova and took back his lead to win by half a length in the final strides. He would also add the Black and White Creole Trophy to his wins that year. However, he also suffered a hand full of defeats finishing second in both the Diamond Jubilee Caribbean Champion Stakes and the President's Cup but afterward being disqualified to fourth place. At the end of his 3-year-old season he would run in the biggest race of his life the Clásico del Caribe. Immediately a change from turf to dirt was already gonna make it hard.

As well as that no horse from Trinidad And Tobago had ever won the race. The race began with the field chasing right behind the front runner Guaybanex. In the final turn, he tried to make a move to catch Guaybanex but he didn't have it in him Guaybanex was simply too strong and would repel him and 2 other horses who would also make there move leading to a 3-way photo finish for second place. Royal Colours would get the short end of the stick finishing fourth only a length behind Guaybanex and a nose behind second and third. At age 4 he would run a total of 7 times managing 2 victories with 3 second-place finishes as well. Which included the introduction of the graded stakes system that same year. Royal Colours would get his first official grade 1 race when he took the President's Easter Trophy by a length. As well as having second places in major races such as the Cockspur 'Five Star' Gold Cup. His last major stakes victory would come in the International Trust Caribbean Stakes defeating champions from Barbados such as Martinique. As well as Dominican Republics Champion 3-year-old Senorita Cuquina.

== Death ==
His 4-year-old season was cut short due to a fatal case of laminitis which would eventually take his life in October 1983. Despite this Royal Colours is still considered one of the greatest horses to ever run in Trinidad And Tobago and was able to mass up $384,117 Trinidad dollars as well as US$15,300 and 12000 Barbados dollars. In his honor Santa Rosa Park the racetrack where he took the Triple Crown has since given him his own race the Royal Colours Classic. It's a grade 3 race currently held in early February for 3-year-olds at a distance of 1350 meters. As well as immortalising him amongst the greatest in Trinidad and Tobago by inducting him into the Trinidad and Tobago Racing Hall Of Fame.
