= Emerald Hill (horse) =

Brazilian thoroughbred racehorse

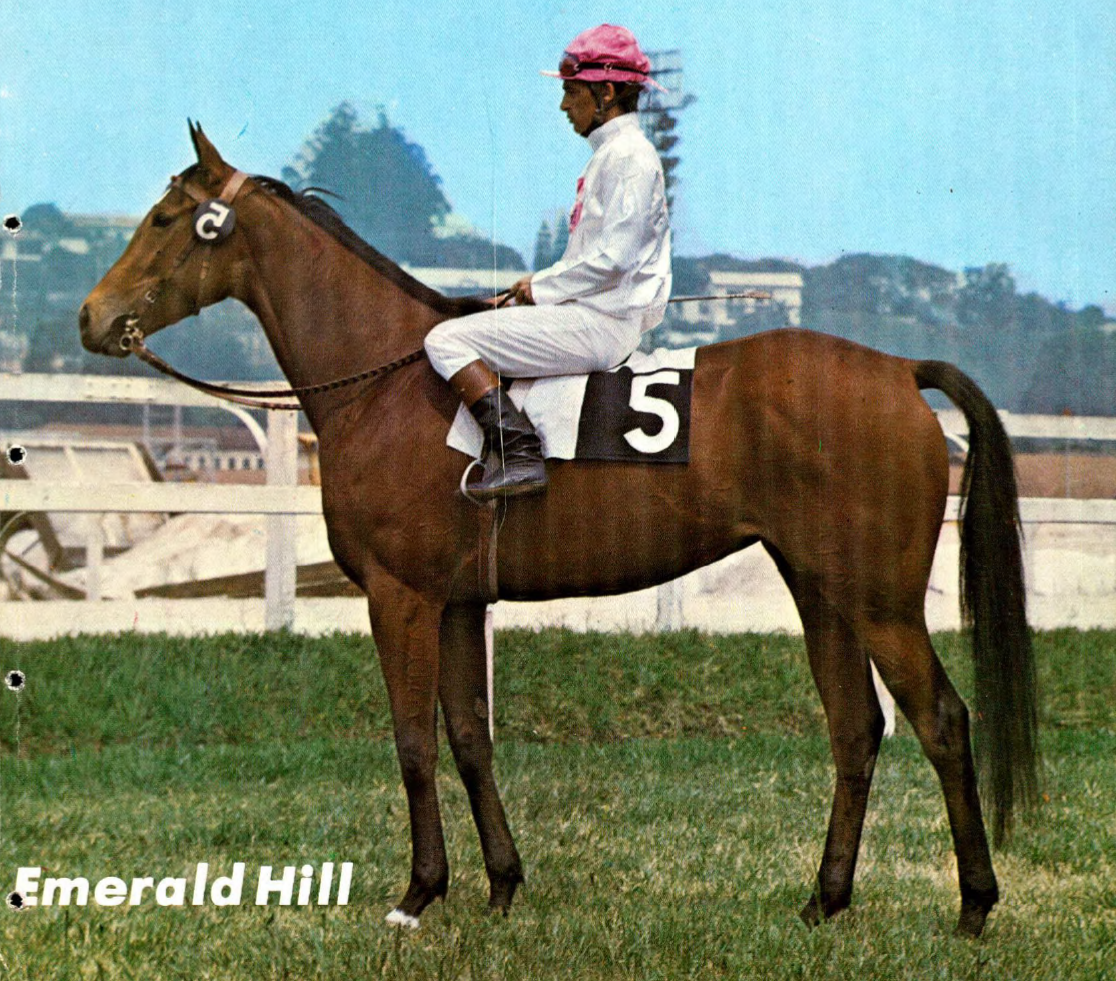
- Emerald Hill on the cover of Turf e Fomento, December 1977
- Sire: Locris
- Grandsire: Venture
- Dam: Embuia
- Damsire: Sunny Boy
- Sex: Mare
- Foaled: November 12, 1974
- Country: Brazil
- Colour: Bay
- Breeder: Haras Guanabara
- Owner: Haras Rosa do Sul
- Record: 14: 10-1-1
- Earnings: $293,188

Major wins
- Grande Prêmio Criação Nacional - Taça de Prata (1977); Grande Prêmio Barão de Piracicaba (1977); Grande Prêmio Diana (1977); Grande Prêmio José Guathemozin Nogueira (1977); Grande Prêmio Henrique Possolo (1978); Grande Prêmio Diana (1978); Grande Prêmio Taça de Ouro (1978)

Emerald Hill was a Brazilian thoroughbred racehorse best known for winning the São Paulo Filly Triple Crown while undefeated and compiling a seven race long Group 1 win streak.

== Background ==
Emerald Hill was bred by Roberto and Nelson Seabra's Haras Guanabara. During her racing career, Emerald Hill was owned by Matias Machline through his Haras Rosa do Sul.

Emerald Hill's sire, Locris, was bred in France, where he won six races, including the Group 2 Prix Jean Prat and Group 3 Coupe de Maisons-Laffitte. He was imported to stand stud in Brazil and had produced several stakes winners prior to Emerald Hill.

Embuia, Emerald Hill's dam, was a winner over 1200-meters at Hipódromo Cidade Jardim. Emerald Hill was her sixth foal. None of her other offspring had noteworthy racing careers, and Embuia died March 2, 1977. Prior to Emerald Hill, Émulo, by Sing Sing, was the most successful, having won five races and run third in the Grande Prêmio Policia Militar do Estado do Paraná.

Embuia's dam and Emerald Hill's second dam, Emocion, was a successful racer, winning the Grande Prêmio Diana at Cidade Jardim and the Grande Prêmio Diana at Gávea. She was a half-sister to the undefeated Brazilian racehorse Emerson and had produced multiple stakes winners, including Embûche, winner of the Grande Prêmio Diana at Cidade Jardim, Grande Prêmio José Guathemozin Nogueira, Grande Prêmio OSAF, and Grande Prêmio Marciano de Aguiar Moreira.

Machline admired the breeding program of the Seabras and wished to purchase a filly from them. He was given the choice of three fillies born in 1974, and chose Emerald Hill.

Carlos Alberto Machline, the son of Matias Machline, considered Emerald Hill to be among the best of his father's racehorses.

== Racing career ==
=== 1977 ===
Emerald Hill debuted at Hipódromo Cidade Jardim in 1977. She won a common 1500-meter race on the dirt in a time of 1:32.6 before winning a selection race for the Taça de Prata in 1:38.7.

Emerald Hill's first stakes race was the Group 1 Grande Prêmio Criação Nacional - Taça de Prata, run over 1609 meters at Cidade Jardim on July 31. In the race, she stalked the pace until entering the final straight, when she went for the lead. With 400 meters left in the race, Emerald Hill hit the lead and began opening up, winning by five lengths in a time of 1:38.3.

Emerald Hill next ran two weeks later on August 14, in the Group 1 Grande Prêmio Barão de Piracicaba, the first leg of the São Paulo Filly Triple Crown, run over 1609 meters on the turf, identical to the Grande Prêmio Criação Nacional. For the new race, her trainer changed to P. Nickel, who would train her for the rest of her Brazilian career. Dami took the early lead in the race, with Emerald Hill right behind her. Emerald Hill briefly took the led before Dami regained it down the backstretch. Once the field entered the homestretch, Emerald Hill again passed Dami. A late run was made by Sophie, necessitating Emerald Hill's jockey, Loacir Cavlheiro, to use the whip. Emerald Hill responded well and outran Sophie to win by a length, with six lengths further back to third.

On October 30, Emerald Hill ran in the second leg of the São Paulo Filly Triple Crown, the Group 1 Grande Prêmio Diana, run over 2000 meters on the turf, and considered the principle race for fillies in São Paulo. She was the strong favorite for the race, and started well, running in third behind Tuyu Bella and Dami. At the end of the backstretch, Emerald Hill took the lead, and she maintained it the rest of the way to the finish line, drawing away to win by three lengths.

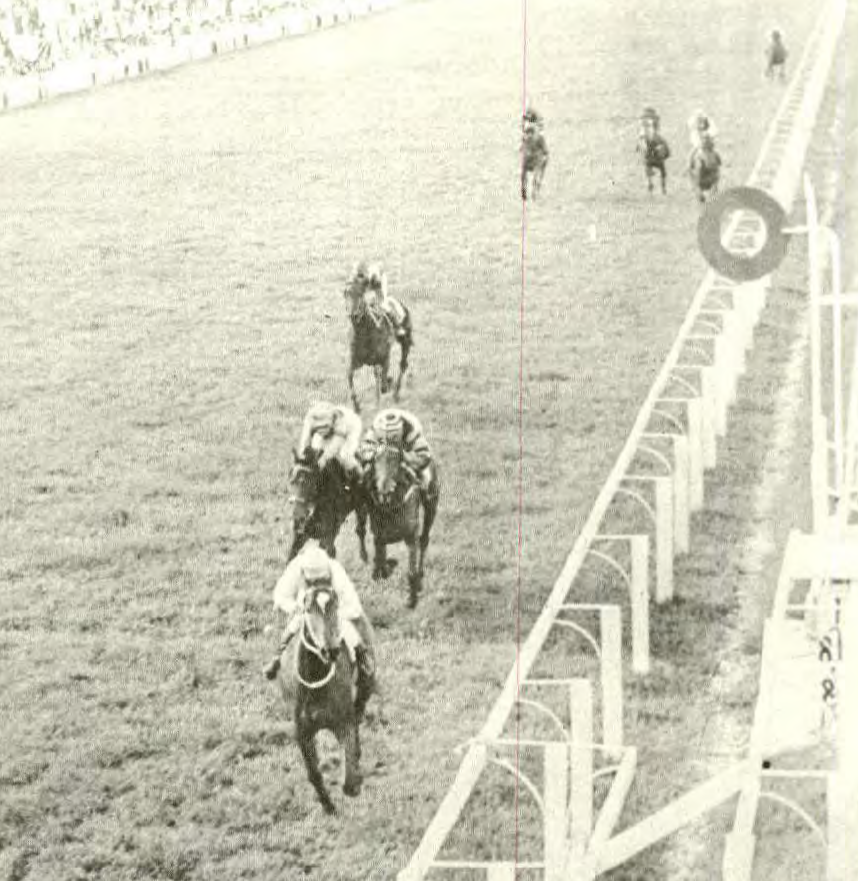
Emerald Hill winning the Grande Prêmio José Guathemozin Nogueira

The third and final leg of the São Paulo Filly Triple Crown, the Group 1 Grande Prêmio José Guathemozin Nogueira, was run on December 4. At a distance of 2400 meters, the José G. Nogueira was the longest race of the São Paulo Filly Triple Crown. At the start of the race, Envaidecida took the lead, with Emerald Hill behind her in second. During the first run down the homestretch, Know That passed both of them, leaving Emerald Hill in third. Halfway around the final turn, Loacir Cavalheiro let Emerald Hill loose, and she quickly caught up to the leaders. In the homestretch, she opened up, winning easily by three lengths with a final time of 2:40.5.

With the win, Emerald Hill became the fourth winner of the São Paulo Filly Triple Crown, after Dulce, Olhada, and Jembélia, and the first to win it while undefeated.

Emerald Hill was ranked second in earnings for São Paulo for 1977, behind Chubasco, who had won the Grande Prêmio Ipiranga and Grande Prêmio Derby Paulista.

=== 1978 ===
Following her victories at Cidade Jardim, Emerald Hill was sent to Hipódromo da Gávea in Rio de Janeiro to contest the top races for fillies there.

Emerald Hill's first race of 1978 was on March 19, in the 1600-meter Group 1 Grande Prêmio Henrique Possolo, which would become the first leg of the Rio de Janeiro Filly Triple Crown. Emerald Hill didn't start off as well in the race as she had in her previous starts, running in the middle of the 21-horse field. With 400 meters left in the race, she hadn't made up ground and was still in eleventh place. Her jockey, Loacir Cavalheiro, found a hole near the inside rail and rode Emerald Hill through it. Emerald Hill quickly reached and then passed the rest of the field to win by more than three lengths in a time of 1:36.6.

Emerald Hill next raced in the Group 1 Grande Prêmio Diana, run over 2000 meters and future second leg of the Rio de Janeiro Filly Triple Crown, on April 16. Emerald Hill started off running in fifth place, and began making her move around the final turn, with about 800 meters left in the race. As the field entered the final straight, Emerald Hill had made her way up to third place. She easily passed the two horses in front of her and pulled away to win easily by six lengths. The final time was 2:02.2. This was her sixth consecutive Group 1 win, drawing her even with the mark set by Mill Reef in 1972.

On April 30, Emerald Hill ran in what would be her final start in Brazil, the Group 1 Grande Prêmio Taça de Ouro Rede Globo. Run over 2000 meters, it was her first start against male horses, and the field included Earp, who would go on to win that year's Group 1 Grande Prêmio Cruzeiro do Sul, and Sunset, who would win the Group 1 Grande Prêmio Jockey Club Brasileiro and Group 1 Grande Prêmio Brasil later that year, as well as other graded stakes winners. Emerald Hill started the race running in sixth place. Around the final turn, Earp took the lead, and Emerald Hill followed behind him so that they were one-two as they entered the homestretch. Earp fought Emerald Hill for about 100 meters before falling back. Emerald Hill took the lead and finished the race with great ease, winning by two lengths with a time equal to what she had run in the Grand Prêmio Diana two weeks earlier. With the win, Emerald Hill extended her undefeated streak to nine races and her Group 1 win streak to seven.

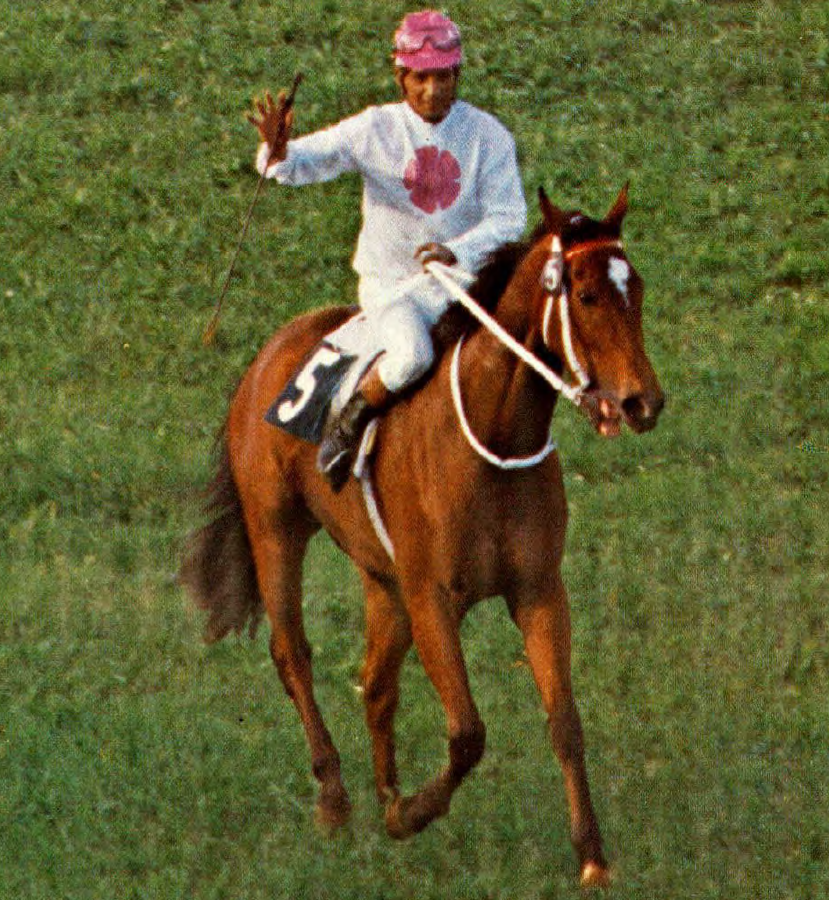
Emerald Hill

=== 1979 ===
In 1979, Emerald Hill was sent to the United States to race. She made her US debut in an allowance race at Belmont Park, which she duly won to extend her undefeated streak to ten.

Emerald Hill first faced graded stakes company in the United States 23 days later, in the Grade 3 New York Handicap, and 8.5 furlong long turf race on the turf at Belmont Park. In that race, Emerald Hill was defeated for the first time, finishing third, although within a half length of the winner.

She ran again a month later in the Group 2 Sheepshead Bay Handicap, over 10 furlongs on the turf, but failed to impress, finishing eighth.

Emerald Hill moved to Saratoga, where she finished second in an allowance in August, then to Meadowlands, where she ran eighth in the ungraded Long Look Handicap.

== Breeding career ==
Emerald Hill returned to Brazil for breeding, where she produced four foals, all by Tumble Lark, one each from 1981 to 1984. Jade Hill was the most successful, winning seven races and finishing third in the Group 2 Grande Prêmio Piratininga.

Emerald Hill is the third dam of Colina Verde, who won the São Paulo Filly Triple Crown and was the Brazilian Champion Three-Year-Old Filly in 2006.

== Pedigree ==
Pedigree of Emerald Hill (BRZ), bay mare, foaled November 12, 1974
Sire Locris (FR) 1964	Venture (GB); 1957	Relic (USA)	War Relic (USA)
Sire Locris (FR) 1964	Venture (GB); 1957	Relic (USA)	Bridal Colors (USA)
Sire Locris (FR) 1964	Venture (GB); 1957	Rose O'Lynn (IRE)	Pherozshah (FR)
Sire Locris (FR) 1964	Venture (GB); 1957	Rose O'Lynn (IRE)	Rocklyn (GB)
Sire Locris (FR) 1964	Ormara (FR); 1958	Djebel (FR)	Tourbillon (FR)
Sire Locris (FR) 1964	Ormara (FR); 1958	Djebel (FR)	Loika (FR)
Sire Locris (FR) 1964	Ormara (FR); 1958	Esmeralda (FR)	Tourbillon (FR)
Sire Locris (FR) 1964	Ormara (FR); 1958	Esmeralda (FR)	Sanaa (FR)
Dam Embuia (BRZ) 1961	Sunny Boy (FR); 1944	Jock (FR)	Asterus (FR)
Dam Embuia (BRZ) 1961	Sunny Boy (FR); 1944	Jock (FR)	Naic (FR)
Dam Embuia (BRZ) 1961	Sunny Boy (FR); 1944	Fille de Soleil (GB)	Solario (IRE)
Dam Embuia (BRZ) 1961	Sunny Boy (FR); 1944	Fille de Soleil (GB)	Fille de Salut (GB)
Dam Embuia (BRZ) 1961	Emocion (BRZ); 1955	Orsenigo (ITY)	Oleander (GER)
Dam Embuia (BRZ) 1961	Emocion (BRZ); 1955	Orsenigo (ITY)	Ostana (ITY)
Dam Embuia (BRZ) 1961	Emocion (BRZ); 1955	Empeñosa (ARG)	Full Sail (GB)
Dam Embuia (BRZ) 1961	Emocion (BRZ); 1955	Empeñosa (ARG)	Ermua (ARG)

Emerald Hill is inbred 4S × 4D to Tourbillon, meaning Tourbillon appears in the fourth generation on both the sire and dam's side of the pedigree. Emerald Hill is also inbred 4D x 5S to Asterus and 5D x 5D to Gainsborough.

== See also ==
- List of leading Thoroughbred racehorses
