= Catire Bello =

Venezuelan Thoroughbred racehorse

- Breed: Thoroughbred
- Sire: Inland Voyager
- Grandsire: Roberto
- Dam: Pink Screen
- Damsire: Silent Screen
- Sex: Stallion
- Foaled: April 24, 1989
- Died: February 20, 2001
- Country: Venezuela
- Color: Chestnut
- Owner: Stud Ilusion
- Trainer: Ivan Calixto
- Record: 19:13-3-0
- Earnings: $441,855

Major wins
- Clásico Comparación (1991); Clasico Jose Antonio Paez (1992); Clásico Cría Nacional (1992); Clásico República de Venezuela (1992); Premio Cria Nacional(1992); Premio Internacional Copa de Oro (1992); Gran Premio Unicria (1992)

Awards
- Venezuelan Co-Champion 2-Year-Old Male (1991); Venezuelan Horse Of The Year (1992); Venezuelan Champion 3-Year-Old Male (1992); Venezuelan Champion Sprinter (1992); Leading First Crop Sire in Venezuela (1997); Leading Sire in Venezuela (1999)

Catire Bello (April 24, 1989–February 20, 2001) was a Venezuelan racehorse who was most famous for his participation in the Florida Derby and becoming the 4th Venezuelan Triple Crown winner.

== Background ==
Catire Bello which roughly translates to pretty blonde in Spanish was a Chestnut colt bred at Haras La Quebrada. He had no white markings on his feet but he had a signature white blaze on his face to go along with his orange coat. His sire was Inland Voyager a modest stakes runner who never finished better than 4th in graded stakes company. However he was quite an influential sire in Venezuela. Siring champions such as Voyardo, Delta Force, and Traffic Control His dam Pink Screen was a proven dam who mostly ran in allowance races. At auction he would be sold to Stud Illusion for 1,150,000 Venezuelan bolívars.

== History ==
=== 2-year-old-season ===
Catire Bello would make his first start on August 4, 1991, the race would be contested at 1100 meters or 5 1/2 furlongs. The race was an effortless victory by 11 lengths. His debut was so impressive that 20 days later he would go into stakes company for the grade 3 Clasico Victoreado. Again it was barely even a challenge to Catire Bello. Halfway through the homestretch he already had a huge lead but in an instant, he more than doubled it to 8 lengths running away comfortably defeating Santu Pretu. Despite a small set back finishing second in the Premio Alberto H. Cipriani behind Santu Pretu. He would make his grade 1 debut in his 4th start the Premio Comparacion. Catire Bello would break well and set the pace keeping a good 1 length lead overall comers that tried to get near him. However, by the far turn, he began to simply open up throughout the stretch managing a 6 length score getting back at Santu Pretu. After another win 6 days later his 2-year-old year concluded and he would be awarded Co-Champion 2-year-old along with Santu Pretu.

=== 3-year-old season ===
To start his 3-year-old-year Catire Bello would continue his success in Venezuela with 2 more victories being added to his record. In both of these, he would have a rematch with fellow Venezuelan champion 2-year-old Santu Pretu. The first of these was the grade 2 Premio Francisco de Miranda. The race would go entirely Catire Bello's way as he would take the lead by a length with Santu Pretu right behind him. As they moved into the far turn Santu Pretu moved on the rail only a neck behind Catire Bello. But on the outside, Catire Bello with steady encouragement would slowly but surely repel Santu Pretu and go on to win. The second time around the race was not even a contest Santu Pretu was not able to get close to Catire Bello and he would easily romp by 11 lengths.

=== American Campaign ===
The 2 wins were so impressive to his trainer Ivan Calixto they decided to ship overseas and try an American campaign with hopes of running in the Kentucky Derby. His first prep to get ready for the Kentucky Derby would be the Florida Derby, with hopes that if he ran well enough they could continue forward towards the Kentucky Derby. The race would offer him many new challenges that he had never had to deal with before. He had never been around 2 turns, as well the quality of the horses in the race would be way harder than those in Venezuela. The idea of a Venezuelan colt winning the Kentucky Derby was not impossible as Canonero II had done it 21 years prior. Many Venezuelans attended the race and listened on the radio to see their horse run. However, when the race began Catire Bello slammed into the starting gate cutting into his stiffe and getting rid of any chance he had of winning. He would not be able to go the lead and instead had to pick off runners late he would face trouble again with 3/16th's to go to be a distant 6th place.

Despite such a rough start to his American campaign Catire Bello would try again with a run in the Tropical Park Derby. Despite breaking better this time he simply didn't have it in him a higher dose of Lasix and fast fractions led to an even bigger dud then seen in the Florida Derby finishing 9th and only managing to defeat 1 horse in the race. His final bid to make it into the Kentucky Derby would be the Derby Trial. Like in the Florida Derby he would not go to the lead and stay towards the back running past tired horses to finish 4th by over 11 lengths. The possibility of making it into the Kentucky Derby was now simply unachievable so they decided to go for the Venezuelan Triple Crown instead.

=== Venezuelan Triple Crown ===
With no hope of running in the Kentucky Derby and replicating the achievements of Canonero II they shipped Catire Bello back quickly to get him back to Venezuela in time for the first jewel of the triple crown The Clasico Jose Antonio Paez. The trip back was very exhausting as Catire Bello would have just over 3 weeks after the Derby Trial to run in The Clasico Jose Antonio Paez. The trip caused Catire Bello to lose over 20 kilograms or 44 pounds. To get him into shape trainer Ivan Calixto prepped him with easy 2 mile gallops. Even with a nearly undefeated record in Venezuela people were skeptical if he was fit enough to win the race. Due to many people believing that Catire Bello was not at his best and vulnerable the race attracted 10 racers to challenge him. Despite being far from at his fittest Catire Bello ran in the race anyway. At the start, he was not a clear leader, and instead stalked right behind the front runners not going with his normal front running style. But by the far the turn he picked up drifting to the center of the track and opening up a 4 length lead to win.

After winning such a race despite so many disadvantages the criticism disappeared, now everyone knew that Catire Bello was the best 3-year-old horse in Venezuela. By the second jewel the Clasico Ministerio de Agricultura y Cria he had gained back some of the weight he had lost and was closer to his full strength and ready to run. Now that his soundness was no longer questionable he had to answer a new question, could he handle two turns and a 1 1/4-mile race. At the start, he immediately fought for the front managing to take the lead over his rivals. The race after that turned into an exhibition as he continued to open up stride after stride until he crossed the wire 22 lengths ahead of his nearest opponent.

Most challengers were reluctant to compete against Catire Bello after such a performance so for the Clasico Republica de Venezuela only 5 horses challenged him. The race would be run at 1 1/2 miles and seemed to be a sure win. However, some were not so sure when the race began. At the start, Catire Bello zoomed the lead no one followed him except for one horse. His name was Camici and he ran right with him. Camici was a natural-born sprinter and was specifically sent as a rabbit to tire Catire Bello out. He would try as the two fought for the lead setting a suicidal pace running the first quarter in 21 2/5 seconds. But after this Camici was the first to give in and dropped back. Catire Bello had no one even near him. He was able to canter home winning the race by 9 lengths with a final time of 2:32.2. He was now the 4th triple crown winner.

=== 1992 Clásico del Caribe ===
Following his victory in the triple crown, he would race 3 times against elder horses in preparation for the biggest race of his career the Clásico del Caribe. He first would win the Premio Cria Nacional and then the Clasico Copa de Oro one of Venezuela's biggest races. The race started as he got a 1 length advantage in the backstretch and in the far turn opened up. However late game he tired slightly having his lead receding until the wire when he won by just under a length. He would win by a more confident margin in the Gran Premio Unicria before losing his final prep in the Clasico Simon Bolivar.

Even with the loss in the final prep, he was favored for the Clásico del Caribe. At the start, things didn't go his way as he would not manage to take the lead and instead had to move his way up into second place right behind the Panama bred triple crown winner Leonardo. Throughout the entire race, Catire Bello played the role of second-best with Leonardo leading around every turn. Despite giving it all he had Leonardo was too much and Catire Bello remained stationary in second place until the wire as Leonardo won the race by 1 length. Even with 2 losses to end the year Catire Bello was still good enough to earn the award for Venezuelan Horse Of The Year, Champion 3-year-old horse, and Champion Sprinter.

== Retirement ==
After losing the Clásico del Caribe Catire Bello would run once at the age of 4 in the Clasico Andres Bello. At the start, he would be second on the rail but soon he would take the lead. By the far turn, the race was over and he easily won the race carrying 58 kilograms by over 6 lengths. An injury after the race would end his career and he would be put to stud. As a stud, he would manage to still win awards siring multiple champions such as Don Corleone and winning Venezuelan leading first-crop sire in 1997 and leading Venezuelan bred sire in 1999. However, his stud career would be cut short after a battle with Laminitis took his life in 2001.
