= Haras Ojo de Agua =

Thoroughbred racehorse farm in Argentina

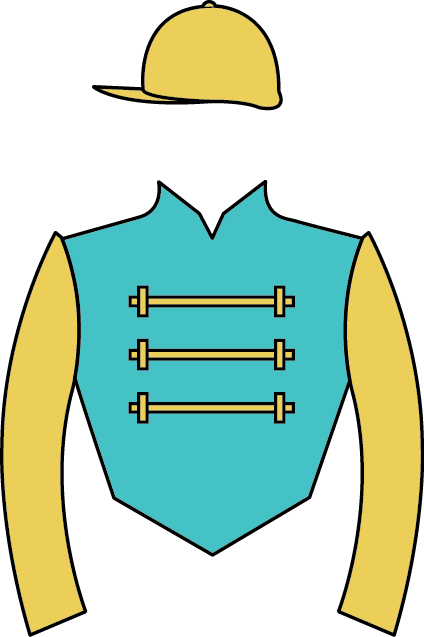
- Racing silks of Haras Ojo de Agua
- Type: Horse breeding farm and Thoroughbred racing stable
- Industry: Thoroughbred horse racing
- Headquarters: General Pueyrredón Partido

Haras Ojo de Agua was a Thoroughbred racehorse breeding and training farm in Argentina and is considered to be "one of the foremost Argentine stud farms of all time."

== History ==
The land for Haras Ojo de Agua was purchased by Pedro Luro from the Argentine Rural Society in 1868. The name Ojo de Agua, meaning 'the eye of the water', was based on the natural spring on the property that produced 1,800,000 liters of water per day. In 1878, several Thoroughbred mares were imported from England to start the farm's breeding program. Gay Hermit was the first stallion imported to stand stud at Haras Ojo de Agua. Other well regarded stallions were later purchased and imported for the stud, including Cyllene, purchased for $125,000, and Polar Star, purchased for $90,000.

The farm was passed down to Santiago Luro, Pedro Luro's second son and two-time president of the Jockey Club Argentino.

In 1909, the farm covered 6,000 acres and had 98 broodmares. By 1914, Haras Ojo de Agua was the largest horse breeding farm in the world. In 1967, the number of broodmares on the property had increased to 180.

When owner Don Julio Victorica Roca died in 1955, his widow, Señora Victorica Roca, took over running the farm.

Haras Ojo de Agua was the champion racehorse owner in Argentina in 1979 and 1980.

In 1996, Haras Ojo de Agua was purchased by Dieter Meier and racing operations ceased.

== Notable horses ==
=== Stallions ===
Notable stallions that have stood at stud at Haras Ojo de Agua include:

- Gay Hermit – Leading sire in Argentina in 1898-1898 and 1901; leading broodmare sire in Argentina in 1910–1913, 1915, and 1916
- Kendal – Leading sire in Argentina in 1908; leading broodmare sire in Argentina in 1918 and 1919.
- Cyllene – Leading sire in Argentina in 1913
- Your Majesty – Leading sire in Argentina in 1920 and 1926; leading broodmare sire in Argentina in 1933, 1937, 1939, and 1940
- Congreve – Leading sire in Argentina in 1937, 1939–1941, and 1943–1945; leading broodmare sire in Argentina in 1948, 1949, and 1951-1953
- Advocate – Leading broodmare sire in Argentina in 1963 and 1966
- Aristophanes – Leading sire in Argentina in 1960
- Pietermaritzburg – Leading sire in Argentina in 1911
- Good Manners – Leading sire in Argentina in 1979
- Pont l'Eveque – Notable sire in Argentina
- Polar Star – Notable sire in Argentina
- Adam's Apple – Notable sire in Argentina
- Foxglove – Notable sire in Argentina
- Churrinche – Notable sire in Argentina

=== As a breeder ===
Notable racehorses bred by Haras Ojo de Agua include:

- Valero (1896) – Winner of the 1899 Gran Premio Nacional and Gran Premio Jockey Club
- Partícula (1899) – Winner of the 1902 Gran Premio Selección
- Floreal (1902) – Winner of the 1905 Gran Premio Nacional
- Américo (1900) – Winner of the 1903 Gran Premio Nacional and Gran Premio Jockey Club
- Locandiera (1907) – Winner of the 1910 Gran Premio Selección and Polla de Potrancas
- Saint Emilion (1913) – Winner of the 1916 Gran Premio Nacional
- Omega (1915) – Winner of the 1918 Gran Premio Nacional and Gran Premio Selección
- Tiny (1916) – Winner of the 1919 Gran Premio Nacional and Gran Premio Internacional
- Pulgarín (1918) – Winner of the 1921 Gran Premio Nacional and Polla de Potrillos
- Macón (1922) – Undefeated Argentine champion, winner of the 1925 Polla de Potrillos, Gran Premio Nacional, and 1926 and 1926 Gran Premio Carlos Pellegrini
- Embrujo (1924) – Winner of the Argentine Triple Crown
- Sierra Balcarce (1927) – Winner of the Argentine Filly Triple Crown
- Côte d'Or (1928) – Winner of the 1931 Gran Premio Selección and 1933 Gran Premio Carlos Pellegrini
- Ix (1932) – Winner of the 1935 Gran Premio Jockey Club, Gran Premio Nacional, and Gran Premio Carlos Pellegrini
- Kayak (1935) – U.S. Champion Older Male Horse in 1939, winner of the 1939 Santa Anita Handicap and Hollywood Gold Cup
- La Mission (1937) – Winner of the Argentine Filly Triple Crown and 1940 Gran Premio Carlos Pellegrini
- Dalilah (1939) – Winner of the 1942 Polla de Potrancas and Gran Premio Selección
- Doria (1949) – Winner of the 1953 Premio Maipú, etc.; notable broodmare
- Atlas (1955) – Winner of the 1959 Grande Prêmio São Paulo and 1960 Gran Premio Carlos Pellegrini
- Dorine (1958) – 1961/62 Argentine Champion Three-Year-Old Filly, 1962/63 Argentine Champion Older Female, winner of the 1962 Premio Criadores and Premio Enrique Acebal and 1962 and 1963 Premio Gilberto Lerena; second dam of Personal Ensign
- Forli (1963) – Winner of the Argentine Quadruple Crown, Argentine Horse of the Year in 1966/67
- Mocito Guapo (1972) – Winner of the Premio Comparación, notable sire in Chile
- Farnesio (1974) – Winner of the Gran Premio Jockey Club; leading broodmare sire in Chile in 1995
- Ahmad (1975) – Argentine Horse of the Year in 1979, winner of the 1979 Gran Premio General San Martín and Gran Premio Joaquín V. González
