= Embrujo =

Argentine thoroughbred racehorse

- Sire: Congreve
- Grandsire: Copyright
- Dam: Encore
- Damsire: Your Majesty
- Sex: Stallion
- Foaled: 20 September 1936
- Died: 1952
- Country: Argentina
- Colour: Chestnut
- Breeder: Haras Ojo de Agua (Raúl Chevalier)
- Owner: Caballeriza Los Patrios
- Trainer: Oscar Canay
- Record: 8: 6-0-0
- Earnings: m$n192,000

Major wins
- Polla de Potrillos (1939); Gran Premio Jockey Club (1939); Gran Premio Nacional (1939); Premio General Pueyrredón (1940)

Awards
- Argentine Triple Crown winner (1939); Argentine Champion Three-Year-Old (1939)

Embrujo (20 September 1936–1952) was a champion Argentine thoroughbred racehorse who won the Argentine Triple Crown and became one of Argentina's most important sires of the 20th century.

== Background ==
Embrujo was bred by Haras Ojo de Agua, one of the leading stud farms of Argentina. He was a chestnut horse with a stripe.

Embrujo was considered handsome and was noted to have short cannons and strong hindquarters.

Embrujo was purchased by and raced for Stud Los Patrios, owned by Clemente Zavaleta and Ernesto Pueyrredón.

== Racing career ==
Embrujo started racing in 1939 at age 3, winning his first five starts. These included the Gran Premio Polla de Potrillos, Gran Premio Jockey Club, and Gran Premio Nacional, making him the ninth winner of the Argentine Triple Crown. Embrujo made his sixth and final start of 1939 in the Gran Premio Carlos Pellegrini, the final leg of the Argentine Quadruple Crown. He finished fourth to Romántico and came out of the race lame.

Embrujo returned to the races in 1940 with a record-setting win in the 3000-meter Premio General Pueyrredón. He next raced in the Gran Premio de Honor, in which he broke down.

== Stud career ==
After his injury, Embrujo was retired from racing to stand stud at Haras Chapadmalal in 1940. In 1950, Embrujo was moved to stand stud at Ernesto Pueyrredón's Haras El Paraíso. He stood there for two seasons before dying there of colic in 1952.

Although he never led the sire list, Embrujo is considered to be one of the great stallions of the world and a premier Argentine sire. He made the leading sire list 11 times, and finished second in 1951 and 1953, third in 1950, and fourth in 1947, 1948, 1949, and 1954.

Embrujo was considered a magnificent broodmare sire and was the damsire of 38 stakes winners. His daughters are noted to have nicked especially well with Sideral, Gulf Stream, Tatán, and Make Tracks. Embrujo was second on the Argentine broodmare sire list in 1961 and 1965 and third in 1959.

=== Notable progeny ===
- Nigromante, 1947/48 Argentine Champion Three-Year-Old, winner of the Gran Premio Polla de Potrillos, Gran Premio Jockey Club, Gran Premio Montevideo, etc. Champion sire.
- Penny Post, Argentine Horse of the Year, winner of the Gran Premio Carlos Pellegrini, Gran Premio Nacional, Gran Premio de Honor, Gran Premio José P. Ramírez, etc. Notable sire.
- Niña Bruja, 1946/47 Argentine Champion Three-Year-Old Filly, winner of the Gran Premio Polla de Potrancas, Clásico Jorge Atucha, etc.
- Quetzalcoatl, winner of the Gran Premio Polla de Potrillos
- Duty, winner of the Gran Premio Selección and Clásico Criadores
- Nyleptha, winner of the Gran Premio Selección
- Basajuan, winner of the Gran Premio Jockey Club
- Romantic, winner of the Gran Premio Nacional
- Préndase, winner of the Gran Premio Internacional Simón Bolívar
- Invernal, winner of the Clásico Montevideo, Clásico Raúl Chevalier, Clásico Santiago Luro, etc.

=== Notable progeny of daughters ===
- Sensitivo, winner of the Clásico Miguel Alfredo Martínez de Hoz, Display Handicap, Gallant Fox Handicap, etc.
- Pasion, Argentine Champion Three-Year-Old Filly, winner of the Gran Premio Selección, Gran Premio Polla de Potrancas, Clásico Ignacio Correas
- Dulce, Brazilian Champion Three-Year-Old Filly and Champion Older Mare, winner of the Grande Prêmio Jockey Club, Grande Prêmio São Paulo, Grande Prêmio Barão de Piracicaba, etc.
- Make Money, 1965 Argentine Champion Sprinter, winner of the Clásico Maipú, Clásico Palermo, etc. Sire.
- Toujours, winner of the Clásico Ignacio Correas

== Pedigree ==
Pedigree of Embrujo (ARG), chestnut stallion, foaled September 20, 1936
Sire Congreve (ARG) 1924	Copyright (GB); 1918	Tracery (USA)	Rock Sand (GB)
Sire Congreve (ARG) 1924	Copyright (GB); 1918	Tracery (USA)	Topiary (GB)
Sire Congreve (ARG) 1924	Copyright (GB); 1918	Rectify (GB)	William the Third (GB)
Sire Congreve (ARG) 1924	Copyright (GB); 1918	Rectify (GB)	Simplify (IRE)
Sire Congreve (ARG) 1924	Per Noi (ARG)	Perrier (GB)	Persimmon (GB)
Sire Congreve (ARG) 1924	Per Noi (ARG)	Perrier (GB)	Amphora (GB)
Sire Congreve (ARG) 1924	Per Noi (ARG)	My Queen (ARG)	Batt (GB)
Sire Congreve (ARG) 1924	Per Noi (ARG)	My Queen (ARG)	Princesa (ARG)
Dam Encore (ARG) 1927	Your Majesty (GB); 1905	Persimmon (GB)	St. Simon (GB)
Dam Encore (ARG) 1927	Your Majesty (GB); 1905	Persimmon (GB)	Perdita (GB)
Dam Encore (ARG) 1927	Your Majesty (GB); 1905	Yours (ITY)	Melton (GB)
Dam Encore (ARG) 1927	Your Majesty (GB); 1905	Yours (ITY)	Your Grace (FR)
Dam Encore (ARG) 1927	Efilet (ARG); 1922	Let Fly (GB)	White Eagle (IRE)
Dam Encore (ARG) 1927	Efilet (ARG); 1922	Let Fly (GB)	Gondolette (GB)
Dam Encore (ARG) 1927	Efilet (ARG); 1922	Efigie (ARG)	Druid (ARG)
Dam Encore (ARG) 1927	Efilet (ARG); 1922	Efigie (ARG)	Emoción (ARG)

Embrujo is inbred 3D x 4S to Persimmon, which means that Persimmon appears in the third generation on the dam's side and the fourth generation on the sire's side. He is also inbred 4D x 5S x 5S to St. Simon.
