= Pont l'Eveque (horse) =

British Thoroughbred racehorse

Pont l’Eveque
- Sire: Barneveldt
- Grandsire: The Winter King
- Dam: Ponteba
- Damsire: Belfonds
- Sex: Stallion
- Foaled: 25 May 1937
- Country: Britain
- Colour: Bay
- Breeder: Henry E. Morriss
- Owner: Fred Darling
- Trainer: Fred Darling
- Record: 7: 3-2-1
- Earnings: £

Major wins
- New Derby (1940)

Pont l’Eveque (1937– after 1957) was a British Thoroughbred racehorse. In a career that lasted from 1939 until 1940 he ran seven times and won three races. His most important success came in 1940 when he won the “New Derby”, a wartime substitute for The Derby run at Newmarket. He had not been thought good enough to be included among the original Derby nominations, but was allowed to enter when the race was rearranged. He was retired to stud at the end of the season and exported to Argentina in 1942.

== Background ==
Pont l’Eveque was a very late foal, born at the end of the breeding season on 25 May, making him probably the youngest horse to win the Derby. He had conceived in France but imported to England “in utero” by his breeder and first owner, the Shanghai-based bullion-broker Henry E. Morriss. He was a small bay horse who was never particularly striking or attractive, being described as looking “plain” and “mean”. Pont l’Eveque’s sire was Barneveldt, a leading racehorse in France, who won the Grand Prix de Paris in 1931. His dam, Ponteba produced no other runners of any consequence, but was a half sister of the 1935 Royal Hunt Cup winner Priok.

Partly because of his unprepossessing appearance and lack of size it was not considered worthwhile in entering him for the Classics. Pont l’Eveque was sent into training as a two-year-old with Fred Darling (who eventually came to own the colt) at Beckhampton, in Wiltshire.

== Racing career ==
=== 1939: two-year-old season ===
Pont l’Eveque showed little ability as a two-year-old, running twice without success. He was unplaced on his debut and then ran second in the Beaufort Handicap, a minor event at Newmarket. He was far inferior to his stable companion Tant Mieux, who was the highest-rated two-year-old of the season. Henry Morriss was managing his business interests in China, leaving his wife to manage his string of racehorses. At the end of 1939, Mrs Morriss decided to reduce the number of horses she had in training and Pont l’Eveque was one of those considered surplus to requirements. Fred Darling failed to find a buyer for the colt and eventually decided to the buy the colt himself for 500 guineas.

=== 1940: three-year-old season ===
Horses are entered for the British Classic Races as yearlings. Today a horse may be “supplemented” for the race at a later date for a substantially increased entry fee, but no such arrangement existed in 1940. The outbreak of war however, meant that most racing was cancelled or re-arranged and when the decision was taken to run a substitute “Derby” at an alternative venue (Epsom was used for an anti-aircraft battery), the race was treated as a completely new event and opened for entries. As Pont l’Eveque had made excellent progress through the winter, Darling decided to enter him for the new race.

Pont l’Eveque’s three-year-old debut provided evidence of his progress as he was a very easy winner of a twenty-two runner maiden race over a mile at Newbury on 13 April. Shortly after the race, Darling offered to sell a half-share in the colt back to Henry Morriss, but the offer was not accepted. Pont l’Eveque was then moved up in class for the Newmarket Stakes over ten furlongs on 22 May, and although he was well beaten by Lighthouse II, he did enough in finishing second to establish himself as a Derby contender. At the end of May, in the week of the Dunkirk Evacuation, Pont l’Eveque warmed up for the Derby when he “breezed home” in the Longleat Stakes at Salisbury.

Arrangements for the New Derby were fluid, but after plans to run the race at Newbury were abandoned, it eventually took place at Newmarket on 12 June. Attendance for the race was much smaller than usual, but still substantial, with over 50,000 present. The French colt Djebel had been able to cross the channel to win the 2000 Guineas but such journeys were no longer possible and Lighthouse II was sent off favourite, with Pont l’Eveque starting at 10/1 in a field of sixteen. Britain's leading jockey Gordon Richards had been expected to ride Pont l'Eveque, but was transferred to the stables other entry Tant Mieux, leaving the ride to Sam Wragg. Coverage of the race was less detailed than usual, but reports indicate that Pont l’Eveque was in front before half way. He stayed on strongly up the July Course’s ten-furlong straight and after being briefly challenged by Lighthouse, drew clear to win in "most impressive style" by three lengths from Turkhan.

Pont l’Eveque was then off the course for four months before returning in the Champion Stakes at Newmarket on 30 October. He was expected to win, but failed to reproduce his summer form and finished third to Hippius. He missed an intended run in the substitute "Yorkshire St Leger" at Thirsk, and was then retired to stud.

== Assessment ==
In their book A Century of Champions, John Randall and Tony Morris rated Pont l'Eveque an “inferior” Derby winner.

== Stud career ==
Wartime restrictions meant that there were limited opportunities for British stallions during the early 1940s, and after only two seasons at stud, Pont l’Eveque was sold and exported Argentina to stand stud at Haras Ojo de Agua. He was not a great success although he did sire one good horse in Caburé, who finished second in the 1946 Gran Premio Nacional. He was also the damsire of Atlas (Gran Premio Carlos Pellegrini and Grande Prêmio São Paulo) and Contadera (Gran Premio Selección). The date of his death is not recorded, but his last foals would appear to have been conceived in 1957 or 1958.

== Pedigree ==
Pedigree of Pont l’Eveque (GB), bay stallion, 1937
| Sire Barneveldt (FR) 1928 | The Winter King; 1918 | Son-in-Law | Dark Ronald |
| Sire Barneveldt (FR) 1928 | The Winter King; 1918 | Son-in-Law | Mother In Law |
| Sire Barneveldt (FR) 1928 | The Winter King; 1918 | Signorinetta | Chaleureux |
| Sire Barneveldt (FR) 1928 | The Winter King; 1918 | Signorinetta | Signorina* |
| Sire Barneveldt (FR) 1928 | Black Domino; 1917 | Black Jester | Polymelus* |
| Sire Barneveldt (FR) 1928 | Black Domino; 1917 | Black Jester | Absurdity |
| Sire Barneveldt (FR) 1928 | Black Domino; 1917 | Osyrua | Desmond* |
| Sire Barneveldt (FR) 1928 | Black Domino; 1917 | Osyrua | Lady Candahar |
| Dam Ponteba (FR) 1930 | Belfonds; 1922 | Isard | Le Samaritain |
| Dam Ponteba (FR) 1930 | Belfonds; 1922 | Isard | Irish Idyll |
| Dam Ponteba (FR) 1930 | Belfonds; 1922 | La Buire | Perth |
| Dam Ponteba (FR) 1930 | Belfonds; 1922 | La Buire | Lark |
| Dam Ponteba (FR) 1930 | Poet’s Star; 1917 | Chaucer | St Simon* |
| Dam Ponteba (FR) 1930 | Poet’s Star; 1917 | Chaucer | Canterbury Pilgrim |
| Dam Ponteba (FR) 1930 | Poet’s Star; 1917 | Lady Cynosure | Cyllene* |
| Dam Ponteba (FR) 1930 | Poet’s Star; 1917 | Lady Cynosure | Maid Marian* (Family: 3f)* |

* Pont l'Eveque is inbred 5S x 5S x 4D to the stallion St Simon, meaning that he appears fifth generation twice (via Signorina and Desmond) on the sire side of his pedigree, and fourth generation on the dam side of his pedigree.

* Pont l'Eveque is inbred 5S x 4D to the stallion Cyllene, meaning that he appears fifth generation (via Polymelus) on the sire side of his pedigree, and fourth generation on the dam side of his pedigree.

* Pont l'Eveque is inbred 5S x 4D to the mare Maid Marian, meaning that she appears fifth generation (via Polymelus) on the sire side of his pedigree, and fourth generation on the dam side of his pedigree.
