= Ahmad (horse) =

Argentine Thoroughbred racehorse

- Sire: Good Manners
- Grandsire: Nashua
- Dam: Azyade
- Damsire: Churrinche
- Sex: Stallion
- Foaled: October 5, 1975
- Died: July 31, 1995
- Country: Argentina
- Colour: Bay
- Breeder: Haras Ojo de Agua
- Record: 14: 13-1-0

Major wins
- Premio Libertad (1978); Gran Premio General San Martín (1979); Gran Premio Organisación Sudamericana de Fomento del Puro Sangre de Carrera (1979); Gran Premio Internacional Joaquín V. González (1979); Premio Mariano Moreno (1979); Premio Benito Villanueva (1979); Premio Miguel Alfredo Martínez de Hoz (1979); Premio República Federativa del Brasil (1979); Premio Italia (1979); Clásico Otoño (1980)

Awards
- Argentine Horse of the Year (1979); Argentine Champion Miler (1979); Argentine Champion Sire (1991)

Ahmad (1975-1995) was an Argentine Thoroughbred racehorse who was the Argentine Horse of the Year in 1979 and leading sire in 1991.

== Background ==
Ahmad was bred by Haras Ojo de Agua and foaled on October 5, 1975.

Ahmad's sire, Good Manners, was bred and raced in the United States, where he won the Haggin Stakes and ran second in the San Antonio Handicap, before being exported to Argentina at Haras Ojo de Agua.

His dam Azyade was unraced. Ahmad was her sixth foal, and the most successful on the track.

During his racing career, Ahmad was trained by Carlos Ferro.

Ahmad was noted as being of "elegant make".

== Racing career ==
Ahmad started racing at the age of three, winning his debut at Hipódromo Argentino de Palermo. He won two more races before running in and winning his first stakes race, the Group 3 Premio Libertad.

Ahmad's first race in 1979, the Group 2 Premio América, was the only race he lost, finishing second to Golden Coin.

He ran eight more times in 1979, winning all of them, including the Group 1 Gran Premio Joaquín V. González, Group 1 Gran Premio OSAF, and Group 1 Gran Premio General San Martín. He was named the 1979 Argentine Horse of the Year and Champion Miler for his campaign.

Ahmad ran once more, in 1980, winning the Clásico Otoño at Hipódromo Argentino de Palermo.

== Race record ==
| Date | Age | Distance | Surface | Race | Grade | Track | Finish | Ref |
|---|---|---|---|---|---|---|---|---|
| Oct 8, 1978 | 3 | | Dirt | Premio: Eternelle | Conditional | Hipódromo Argentino de Palermo | 1 | |
| Nov 5, 1978 | 3 | 1600 meters | Dirt | Premio: Jockey Club de Monte | Conditional | Hipódromo Argentino de Palermo | 1 | |
| Nov 12, 1978 | 3 | | Dirt | Especial Tomas Lyon | Handicap | Hipódromo Argentino de Palermo | 1 | |
| Dec 16, 1978 | 3 | | Dirt | Premio Libertad | III | Hipódromo Argentino de Palermo | 1 | |
| Feb 2, 1979 | 3 | 1600 meters | Dirt | Premio América | II | Hipódromo Argentino de Palermo | 2 | |
| Mar 4, 1979 | 3 | 1600 meters | Dirt | Gran Premio Joaquín V. González | I | Hipódromo La Plata | 1 | |
| Mar 31, 1979 | 3 | 2200 meters | Dirt | Gran Premio Organisación Sudamericana de Fomento del Puro Sangre de Carrera | I | Hipódromo Argentino de Palermo | 1 | |
| May 13, 1979 | 3 | 1600 meters | Dirt | Premio República Federativa del Brasil | III | Hipódromo Argentino de Palermo | 1 | |
| Jun 16, 1979 | 3 | 1600 meters | Dirt | Premio Benito Villanueva | II | Hipódromo Argentino de Palermo | 1 | |
| Aug 17, 1979 | 4 | 1800 meters | Dirt | Gran Premio General San Martín | I | Hipódromo Argentino de Palermo | 1 | |
| Sep 30, 1979 | 4 | | Dirt | Premio Mariano Moreno | II | Hipódromo Argentino de Palermo | 1 | |
| Dec 2, 1979 | 4 | | Dirt | Premio Italia | III | Hipódromo Argentino de Palermo | 1 | |
| Dec 28, 1979 | 4 | 2000 meters | Turf | Clásico Miguel Alfredo Martínez de Hoz | III | Hipódromo de San Isidro | 1 | |
| Mar 15, 1980 | 4 | 2000 meters | Dirt | Clásico Otoño | Ungraded | Hipódromo Argentino de Palermo | 1 | |

== Stud career ==
Ahmad entered stud at Haras Rincón de Luna in 1985 and stood there in 1994. He died in July 1995.

Ahmad led the Argentine General Sire List in 1991 and 1992 and the Argentina Broodmare Sire List in 2003. He sired 41 (7.1%) stakes winners.

=== Notable progeny ===
c = colt, f = filly

| Foaled | Name | Sex | Major Wins |
| 1982 | Potrillazo | c | Gran Premio Nacional, Gran Premio Copa de Oro |
| 1987 | Luna Rose | f | Gran Premio Polla de Potrancas |
| 1987 | Paseana | f | Gran Premio Enrique Acebal, Breeders' Cup Distaff, Vanity Handicap, Milady Handicap, Apple Blossom Handicap, Santa Margarita Handicap, Santa Maria Handicap, Spinster Stakes |
| 1988 | Potrillon | c | Gran Premio Carlos Pellegrini, Gran Premio Latinoamericano, Gran Premio 25 de Mayo, Carreras de las Estrellas Classic |
| 1988 | Rinconazo | c | Gran Premio Hipódromo de San Isidro |
| 1992 | Atonic | c | Gran Premio Joaquin S. de Anchorena |
| 1992 | Rincon Fraile | c | Carreras de las Estrellas Classic |

== Pedigree ==
Pedigree of Ahmad (ARG), bay stallion, foaled October 5, 1975
| Sire Good Manners (ARG) 1966 | Nashua (USA); 1952 | Nasrullah (GB) | Nearco (ITY) |
| Sire Good Manners (ARG) 1966 | Nashua (USA); 1952 | Nasrullah (GB) | Mumtaz Begum (FR) |
| Sire Good Manners (ARG) 1966 | Nashua (USA); 1952 | Segula (USA) | Johnstown (USA) |
| Sire Good Manners (ARG) 1966 | Nashua (USA); 1952 | Segula (USA) | Sekhmet (FR) |
| Sire Good Manners (ARG) 1966 | Fun House (USA); 1958 | The Doge (USA) | Bull Dog (FR) |
| Sire Good Manners (ARG) 1966 | Fun House (USA); 1958 | The Doge (USA) | My Auntie (USA) |
| Sire Good Manners (ARG) 1966 | Fun House (USA); 1958 | Recess (FR) | Count Fleet (USA) |
| Sire Good Manners (ARG) 1966 | Fun House (USA); 1958 | Recess (FR) | Recce (USA) |
| Dam Azyade (ARG) 1957 | Churrinche (ARG); 1941 | Congreve (ARG) | Copyright (GB) |
| Dam Azyade (ARG) 1957 | Churrinche (ARG); 1941 | Congreve (ARG) | Per Noi (ARG) |
| Dam Azyade (ARG) 1957 | Churrinche (ARG); 1941 | Urraca (ARG) | Your Majesty (GB) |
| Dam Azyade (ARG) 1957 | Churrinche (ARG); 1941 | Urraca (ARG) | Canora (ARG) |
| Dam Azyade (ARG) 1957 | Zeilah (ARG); 1951 | Advocate (GB) | Fair Trial (GB) |
| Dam Azyade (ARG) 1957 | Zeilah (ARG); 1951 | Advocate (GB) | Guiding Star (GB) |
| Dam Azyade (ARG) 1957 | Zeilah (ARG); 1951 | Antinea (ARG) | Pont Leveque (GB) |
| Dam Azyade (ARG) 1957 | Zeilah (ARG); 1951 | Antinea (ARG) | Yamile (ARG) |

== See also ==
- List of leading Thoroughbred racehorses
