= Nigromante =

Argentine-bred thoroughbred racehorse

- Sire: Embrujo
- Grandsire: Congreve
- Dam: Niguá
- Damsire: Songe
- Sex: Stallion
- Foaled: 11 October 1944
- Died: 27 April 1962
- Country: Argentina
- Colour: Chestnut
- Breeder: Haras Chapadmalal (Ernesto Pueyrredón)
- Owner: Caballeriza Los Patrios
- Record: 8: 6-2-0
- Earnings: m$n197,952

Major wins
- Premio Guillermo Kemmis (1947); Gran Premio Montevideo (1947); Premio Miguel Cané (1947); Polla de Potrillos (1947); Gran Premio Jockey Club (1947)

Awards
- Argentine Champion Three-Year-Old (1947/48) Leading Sire in Argentina (1957)

Nigromante (11 October 1944–27 April 1962) was an Argentine-bred thoroughbred racehorse and notable sire. He won two legs of the Argentine Triple Crown and was among the leading sires in both Argentina and the United States.

== Background ==
Nigromante was a dark chestnut horse bred by Ernesto Pueyrredón's Haras Chapadmalal. He was very muscular, with strong hindquarters and a high head, and he had three white socks.

Nigromante was a full brother to Niña Bruja, the first foal of his dam, Niguá. Niña Bruja was a successful racer and was considered the best three-year-old filly in Argentina in 1946.

== Racing career ==
Nigromante only raced in the year of 1947, and was successful enough to be considered one of the best of his generation. He won 6 of his 8 starts, including the Gran Premio Polla de Potrillos, Gran Premio Jockey Club, and Gran Premio Montevideo. In both of his two losses, the Gran Premio Nacional and the Gran Premio Carlos Pellegrini, he finished second to Doubtless.

Nigromante won the first leg of the Argentine Triple Crown, the Polla de Potrillos, by 3 lengths in a time of 1:36 1/5 for 1600 meters. He only faced three other horses in the race, having scared away other potential competition.

Nigromante won his sixth race, the Gran Premio Jockey Club, the second leg of the Argentine Triple Crown. He faced five opponents, and ran in a stalking position behind the fast pace-setter Doubtless. Despite going wide around the turn and being interfered with in the stretch, Nigromante won the race easily by 2 1/2 lengths over Doubtless in a time of 2:01 4/5 for the 2000 meters.

in the Gran Premio Nacional, which was described as being attended by one of its largest crowds in recent years, Doubtless again took the lead, but set a more reasonable pace than in the Gran Premio Jockey Club. Nigromante entered the stretch 6 lengths behind the leader, and managed to close to within 1 1/2 lengths of Doubtless at the wire, finishing second in his first defeat.

== Stud career ==
After retiring from racing, Nigromante entered stud at Haras El Bagual. In late 1957, Rex Ellsworth purchased Nigromante and had him imported in the United States to stand at his Ellsworth Ranch in California.

Nigromante was the Champion Sire in Argentina in 1957, and he finished second in 1958 and third in 1961 on the general sire list. In the United States, he finished third on the general list in 1963.

To the end of 1969, Nigromante sired the winners of 439 races in Argentina and the United States. The Jockey Club credits Nigromantes with siring 171 foals, including 30 stakes winners (17.5%), although the records of his Argentine offspring may be incomplete.

Nigromante died of a ruptured aorta in April 1962.

=== Notable progeny ===
- Candy Spots, winner of the Preakness Stakes, Arlington-Washington Futurity, Santa Anita Derby, Florida Derby, American Derby, Jersey Derby, etc. Notable sire.
- Solito, winner of the Gran Premio Polla de Potrillos and Gran Premio San Isidro
- Ansiedad, winner of the Gran Premio Selección
- Marista, winner of the Gran Premio Jockey Club
- Black Sheep, winner of the American Derby
- Bagualero, winner of the Clásico Santiago Luro
- Jezabel, winner of the Clásico Jorge Atucha
- Niquel, Champion Sire in Peru
- Venusto, winner of the Clásico Comparación
- Magosto, winner of the Clásico La Mission

=== Notable progeny of daughters ===
- Huxley, winner of the Gran Premio Jockey Club
- Flying Target, winner of the Arlington Handicap

== Pedigree ==
Pedigree of Nigromante (ARG), chestnut stallion, foaled October 11, 1944
Sire Embrujo (ARG) 1936	Congreve (ARG); 1924	Copyright (GB)	Tracery (USA)
Sire Embrujo (ARG) 1936	Congreve (ARG); 1924	Copyright (GB)	Rectify (GB)
Sire Embrujo (ARG) 1936	Congreve (ARG); 1924	Per Noi (ARG)	Perrier (GB)
Sire Embrujo (ARG) 1936	Congreve (ARG); 1924	Per Noi (ARG)	My Queen (ARG)
Sire Embrujo (ARG) 1936	Encore (ARG); 1927	Your Majesty (GB)	Persimmon (GB)
Sire Embrujo (ARG) 1936	Encore (ARG); 1927	Your Majesty (GB)	Yours (ITY)
Sire Embrujo (ARG) 1936	Encore (ARG); 1927	Efilet (ARG)	Let Fly (GB)
Sire Embrujo (ARG) 1936	Encore (ARG); 1927	Efilet (ARG)	Efigie (ARG)
Dam Niguá (ARG) 1936	Songe (FR); 1924	Sundari (GB)	Sunder (GB)
Dam Niguá (ARG) 1936	Songe (FR); 1924	Sundari (GB)	Gourouli (FR)
Dam Niguá (ARG) 1936	Songe (FR); 1924	Salamanca (FR)	Flying Fox (GB)
Dam Niguá (ARG) 1936	Songe (FR); 1924	Salamanca (FR)	Sakhara (FR)
Dam Niguá (ARG) 1936	Nitouche (ARG); 1926	St. Wolf (GB)	St. Frusquin (GB)
Dam Niguá (ARG) 1936	Nitouche (ARG); 1926	St. Wolf (GB)	Wolf's Cry (GB)
Dam Niguá (ARG) 1936	Nitouche (ARG); 1926	Nenette (ARG)	Polar Star (IRE)
Dam Niguá (ARG) 1936	Nitouche (ARG); 1926	Nenette (ARG)	La Verde (ARG)
