= El Serrano =

Argentine Thoroughbred racehorse

- Sire: Excel
- Grandsire: Saint Crespin
- Dam: Dashing Rock
- Damsire: Dan Kano
- Sex: Stallion
- Foaled: October 8, 1983
- Colour: Bay
- Breeder: Haras El Paraíso
- Owner: Hickory Tree Stable & Bell Bloodstock Co.
- Record: 15: 11-2-1

El Serrano (8 October 1983−Unk) was an Argentine-bred Thoroughbred racehorse who won the Argentine Triple Crown in 1986.

== Background ==
El Serrano's sire, Excel, won races in England before being sent to stud in North America. He was later brought to Argentina and began to stand stud at Haras El Paraíso.

El Serrano had a calm temperament and impressive physical appearance.

== Racing career ==
El Serrano was owned by a group of Argentinians and based at Hipódromo La Plata at the start of his career. He was stabled 19 blocks away from the track and to walk the distance every day to work. At age 2, he ran in several Group 3 races, winning two, and in his final race of the year won the Group 1 Gran Premio Montevideo.

After winning the 1986 Polla de Potrillos, El Serrano was privately acquired by Bell Bloodstock Co. and James P. Mills, owner of Hickory Tree Stable. He then won the Gran Premio Jockey Club and Gran Premio Nacional, winning the Argentine Triple Crown. He failed to win the Quadruple Crown when he ran sixth in the Gran Premio Carlos Pellegrini that December.

== Race record ==
Date	Age	Surface	Race	Grade	Track	Finish	Ref
Dec 12, 1985	2	Dirt	Especial Iniciacion	Maiden Special Weight	Hipódromo La Plata	2	
Jan 8, 1986	2	Turf	Premio Super Tracks	Conditional	Hipódromo de San Isidro	1	
Jan 19, 1986	2	Dirt	Especial Eduardo Casey	Special	Hipódromo La Plata	1	
Feb 8, 1986	2	Turf	Clásico Congreve	III	Hipódromo de San Isidro	3	
Feb 20, 1986	2	Dirt	Clásico Luis María Doyhenard	III	Hipódromo La Plata	1	
Mar 20, 1986	2	Dirt	Clásico Agustín B. Gambier	III	Hipódromo La Plata	2	
Apr 5, 1986	2	Turf	Clásico Islas Malvinas	Handicap L1	Hipódromo de San Isidro	1	
May 2, 1986	2	Dirt	Clásico Hipódromo Argentino	III	Hipódromo Argentino de Palermo	1	
May 18, 1986	2	Dirt	Gran Premio Montevideo	I	Hipódromo Argentino de Palermo	1	
Jul 13, 1986	3	Dirt	Clásico Old Man	III	Hipódromo Argentino de Palermo	1	
Aug 8, 1986	3	Dirt	Clásico Miguel Cane	II	Hipódromo Argentino de Palermo	1	
Sep 7, 1986	3	Dirt	Gran Premio Polla de Potrillos	I	Hipódromo Argentino de Palermo	1	
Oct 10, 1986	3	Turf	Gran Premio Jockey Club	I	Hipódromo de San Isidro	1	
Nov 9, 1986	3	Dirt	Gran Premio Nacional	I	Hipódromo Argentino de Palermo	1	
Dec 14, 1986	3	Turf	Gran Premio Carlos Pellegrini	I	Hipódromo de San Isidro	6	

== Stud career ==
El Serrano entered stud at Haras La Irenita in 1988, where he stood until 1997. El Serrano sired 4.1% black-type winners (percent of runners). His best progeny was De La Gorra, winner of the Group 1 Gran Premio Criadores.

== Pedigree ==
Pedigree of El Serrano (ARG), bay stallion, foaled October 8, 1983
Sire Excel (GB) 1961	Saint Crespin (GB); 1956	Aureole (GB)	Hyperion (GB)
Sire Excel (GB) 1961	Saint Crespin (GB); 1956	Aureole (GB)	Angelola (USA)
Sire Excel (GB) 1961	Saint Crespin (GB); 1956	Neocracy (GB)	Nearco (ITY)
Sire Excel (GB) 1961	Saint Crespin (GB); 1956	Neocracy (GB)	Harina (IRE)
Sire Excel (GB) 1961	Grey Rhythm (GB); 1954	Grey Sovereign (GB)	Nasrullah (GB)
Sire Excel (GB) 1961	Grey Rhythm (GB); 1954	Grey Sovereign (GB)	Kong (GB)
Sire Excel (GB) 1961	Grey Rhythm (GB); 1954	Metronome (IRE)	Solferino (IRE)
Sire Excel (GB) 1961	Grey Rhythm (GB); 1954	Metronome (IRE)	Golden Meter (IRE)
Dam Dashing Rock (ARG) 1987	Dan Kano (GB); 1964	Dicta Drake (FR)	Phil Drake (FR)
Dam Dashing Rock (ARG) 1987	Dan Kano (GB); 1964	Dicta Drake (FR)	Dictature (FR)
Dam Dashing Rock (ARG) 1987	Dan Kano (GB); 1964	Gillylees (GB)	The Bug (IRE)
Dam Dashing Rock (ARG) 1987	Dan Kano (GB); 1964	Gillylees (GB)	Chanting Hill (GB)
Dam Dashing Rock (ARG) 1987	Shamrock (ARG); 1956	Scratch (FR)	Pharis (FR)
Dam Dashing Rock (ARG) 1987	Shamrock (ARG); 1956	Scratch (FR)	Orlamonde (FR)
Dam Dashing Rock (ARG) 1987	Shamrock (ARG); 1956	Red Clover (ARG)	Colorado Kid (IRE)
Dam Dashing Rock (ARG) 1987	Shamrock (ARG); 1956	Red Clover (ARG)	Watersmeet (IRE)
