= Gran Premio Palermo =

G1 horse race in Argentina

- Class: Group 1
- Location: Hipódromo Argentino de Palermo
- Inaugurated: 1885

Race information
- Distance: 1600 meters
- Surface: Dirt
- Qualification: Three years old and older
- Weight: Weight for age
- Purse: $100,110,000 ARS (2025); 1st: $47,000,000 ARS

The Gran Premio Palermo (previously known as the Premio Palermo and Gran Premio Hipódromo de Palermo) is a Group 1 thoroughbred horse race run at Hipódromo Argentino de Palermo over a distance of 1600 metres (0.99 mi) on the turf, open to horses three years old and older.

== History ==
The Gran Premio Palermo was first run in 1885 as the Premio Palermo.

When the pattern race system was introduced in Argentina in 1973, the Premio Palermo was rated a Group 2 race. In 1979, it was upgraded to a Group 1, a designation it has retained since.

== Records since 1988 ==
Speed record:

- 1:32.33 – Malibu Spring (2022)

Greatest winning margin:

- 16 lengths – Mr. Nancho (2003)

Most wins:

- 2 – El Compinche (1996, 1997)
- 2 – El Garufa (2008, 2009)

Most wins by a jockey:

- 6 – Jacinto R. Herrera (1991, 1993, 1995, 1996, 1997, 2003)
- 4 – Pablo Gustavo Falero (2004, 2010, 2011, 2013)

Most wins by a trainer:

- 4 – Juan Carlos Etchechoury (1995, 1996, 1997, 2012)

Most wins by an owner:

- 6 – Haras La Quebrada (1991, 1995, 1996, 1997, 2001, 2003)

Most wins by a breeder:

- 7 – Haras La Quebrada (2001, 2003, 2007, 2008, 2009, 2013, 2020)
- 6 – Haras Firmamento (1993, 1999, 2010, 2011, 2012, 2021)
- 4 – C. Ceriani & Sara C. Ferrer Reyes (1991, 1995, 1996, 1997)

== Winners since 1988 ==
Year	Winner	Age	Jockey	Trainer	Owner	Breeder	Time	Margin	Ref
2025	Earth God	4	Gustavo E. Calvente	Nicólas Martín Ferro	Stud Grupo 4	Haras Abolengo	1:36.39	1/2 length	
2024	Napa Valley	4	Pablo Damián Carrizo	Pablo Pedro Sahagián	Roque Alberto	Haras Rio Dois Irmaos	1:33.52	2 lengths	
2023	Comando Secreto	5	Kevin Banegas	María Fernanda Álvarez	Stud Sixa	Haras Santa Elena	1:34.56	3 lengths	
2022	Malibu Spring	5	Gonzalo Damián Borda	Marcelo S. Sueldo	Stud El Irlandes	Haras Vikeda	1:32.33	7 lengths	
2021	Bouquet Key	4	Rodrigo G. Blanco	Nicolás Alfredo Gaitán	Stud Zurbaran	Haras Firmamento	1:34.03	1 1/2 lengths	
2020	Power Up	5	Lautaro E. Balmaceda	Enrique Martín Ferro	Stud Urquiza	Haras La Quebrada	1:36.17	4 lengths	
2019	Pinball Wizard	4	Wilson R. Moreyra	Jorge A. Mayansky Neer	Stud Don Teodoro	Haras Carampangue	1:34.69	1/2 length	
2018	Equal Miller	4	Iván E. Monasterolo	Eduardo Gastón Accosano	Stud Ferre	Estancia La Josefina	1:33.04	5 lengths	
2017	Quirico	5	Jorge Antonio Ricardo	Nicolás Ferro	Stud Ligarotti	Haras Santa Ines	1:34.91	3/4 length	
2016	Eragon	5	Gustavo E. Calvente	Roberto Pellegatta	Stud Juan Antonio	Haras Avourneen	1:34.91	2 1/2 lengths	
2015	Idalino	5	Juan Carlos Noriega	Roberto Pellegatta	Stud Pay Ubre	Haras Don Arcangel	1:36.00	1/2 length	
2014	Todo Un Amiguito	6	Juan Cruz Villagra	Ernesto Eusebio Romero	Haras y Stud Don Nico	Carlos Alberto Virgini Monayer	1:33.68	3 lengths	
2013	Capolicho	4	Pablo Gustavo Falero	Miguel Ángel Cafere	Stud Victoria	Haras La Quebrada	1:33.17	Neck	
2012	Saba Emperor	5	Jorge Antonio Ricardo	Juan Carlos Etchechoury	Stud Rubio B.	Haras Firmamento	1:34.58	1/2 head	
2011	Curioso Slam	4	Pablo Gustavo Falero	Pablo Pedro Sahagián	Stud La Pampita	Haras Firmamento	1:32.55	5 lengths	
2010	Mad Speed	5	Pablo Gustavo Falero	Mauricio Jesús Muñiz	Stud Choloe	Haras Firmamento	1:34.58	2 1/2 lengths	
2009	El Garufa	7	Claudio F. Quiroga	Luis Santiago Bedoya	Stud Snow Crest	Haras La Quebrada	1:33.75	1 length	
2008	El Garufa	6	Claudio F. Quiroga	Luis Santiago Bedoya	Stud Snow Crest	Haras La Quebrada	1:35.29	5 lengths	
2007	Fairy Magic	4	José Ricardo Méndez	Alfredo F. Gaitán Dassié	Stud Las Hormigas	Haras La Quebrada	1:33.77	1 1/2 lengths	
2006	Juan Talentoso	5	Gustavo E. Calvente	Carlos Alberto Zarlengo	Stud La Barraca	Haras Alborada	1:33.70	1/2 length	
2005	Latency	4	Julio César Méndez	Juan Bautista Udaondo	Haras Las Dos Manos	Haras Las Dos Manos	1:35.79	3 lengths	
2004	Body Bar	4	Pablo Gustavo Falero	Jorge A. Mayansky Neer	Stud Lagrange	Eduardo Alfredo Solveyra	1:33.87	3 lengths	
2003	Mr. Nancho	3	Jacinto R. Herrera	Juan A. Colucho	Haras La Quebrada	Haras La Quebrada	1:35.57	16 lengths	
2002	Eclipse West	3	Juan José Paulé	Hector R. Pavarini	Haras Las Telas	Haras Las Telas	1:34.47	6 lengths	
2001	Guernika ƒ	4	Juan José Paulé	Nicolás Adrián Yalet	Haras La Quebrada	Haras La Quebrada	1:32.98	3/4 length	
2000	Don Fitz	4	Julio César Méndez	Carlos D. Etchechoury	Haras Orilla del Monte	Haras Ojo de Agua	1:33.81	1/2 neck	
1999	Llers Fitz	4	Juan Pablo Lagos	Sabatino A. Scabone	Stud Milenium	Haras Firmamento	1:35.52	1 1/2 lengths	
1999	Cafetin	3	Cardenas E. Talaverano	Enrique Clerc	Haras Rodeo Chico	Haras Rodeo Chico	1:35.52	1 1/2 lengths	
1998	Di Escorpion	3	Néstor Nicolás Oviedo	Edmundo I. Rodríguez	Stud Cosa Nostra	Haras La Irenita	1:33.60	1 1/2 lengths	
1997	El Compinche	6	Jacinto R. Herrera	Juan Carlos Etchechoury	Haras La Quebrada	C. Ceriani & Sara C. Ferrer Reyes	1:35.74	1 1/2 lengths	
1996	El Compinche	5	Jacinto R. Herrera	Juan Carlos Etchechoury	Haras La Quebrada	C. Ceriani & Sara C. Ferrer Reyes	1:34.86	6 lengths	
1995	Apeles	3	Jacinto R. Herrera	Juan Carlos Etchechoury	Haras La Quebrada	C. Ceriani & Sara C. Ferrer Reyes	1:33.65	1/2 neck	
1994	Star and Stripes ƒ	3	Yolanda B. Dávila	Luis Eduardo Seglín	Stud Dulcinea	Haras El Candil	1:33.98	3 lengths	
1993	Dream Fitz	3	Jacinto R. Herrera	Antonio H. Marsiglia	Stud Villa Biarritz	Haras Firmamento	1:34.70	6 lengths	
1992	Toquete	3	José A. Agüero	Juan C. Baratucci	Stud Orion	Haras El Candil	1:36.39	5 lengths	
1991	Oceanside	4	Jacinto R. Herrera	Carlos Alberto Zarlengo	Haras La Quebrada	C. Ceriani & Sara C. Ferrer Reyes	1:35.87	1 1/2 lengths	
1990	Señor Feudal	4	Miguel Ángel Sarati	Edgardo Oscar Martucci	Haras Orilla del Monte		1:34.89		
1989	Ultrasonido	4	Jorge Valdivieso	Luis A. Riviello	Stud Don Henry	Haras El Turf	1:34.91	5 lengths	
1988	Bacache	5		Edgardo Oscar Martucci	Stud Las Canarias	Haras Vacacion	1:37.21		

ƒ indicates a filly/mare

== Earlier winners ==
- 1885: Fidalgo
- 1886: Escocés
- 1887: Porteñito
- 1888: Recuerdo
- 1889: Monaque
- 1890: Boquerón
- 1891: Don Carlos
- 1892: Sargento
- 1893: Ituzaingó & Anacoreta*
- 1894: Revancha
- 1895: Yankee
- 1896: Imposible
- 1897: Alacrán
- 1898: Ovación
- 1899: Don Pepe
- 1900: Dictador
- 1901: Belcebú
- 1902: Dictador
- 1903: Pimiento
- 1904: Padilla
- 1905: Floreal
- 1906: Pelayo
- 1907: Barsac
- 1908: Barsac
- 1909: Melgarejo
- 1910: Aspero
- 1911: Amsterdan & San Pascual*
- 1912: Larrea
- 1913: Charming
- 1914: Mustafá
- 1915: Melik
- 1916: Campanazo
- 1917: Florilegio
- 1918: Omega ƒ
- 1919: Clamor
- 1920: Moloch
- 1921: Moloch
- 1922: Rico
- 1923: Mameluke
- 1924: Plutarco
- 1945: Snob
- 1946: Estuardo
- 1947: El Guaso
- 1948: Equinox
- 1949: Baturro
- 1950: Eden
- 1951: Chispeado
- 1952: Bigarreau
- 1953: Yatasto
- 1954: Los Curros
- 1955: Atadito
- 1956: Parral
- 1957: Hay Humo
- 1958: Pardon
- 1959: Enfin
- 1960: Rob Roy
- 1961: Bonín
- 1962: Dorine ƒ
- 1963: Snow Palace
- 1964: Snow Cap
- 1965: Make Money
- 1966: Pretty Boy
- 1967: Vin Vin
- 1968: Gabin
- 1969: Perplejo
- 1970: Torrontés
- 1971: Angriff
- 1972: Angriff
- 1973: El Chamical
- 1974: So Bold
- 1975: Incasico
- 1976:
- 1977: Belcho
- 1978: Capitol Sun
- 1979: Bogart
- 1980: Pulines
- 1981: Pied-a-Terre
- 1982: Montego
- 1983: Pochard ƒ
- 1984: Just in Case
- 1986: Peñon
- 1987: Bayakoa ƒ

ƒ indicates a filly/mare

*Ituzaingó and Anacoreta finished in a dead heat for first in 1893. Amsterdam and San Pascual finished in a dead heat for first in 1911.
