= Kayak II (horse) =

Argentine-bred Thoroughbred racehorse

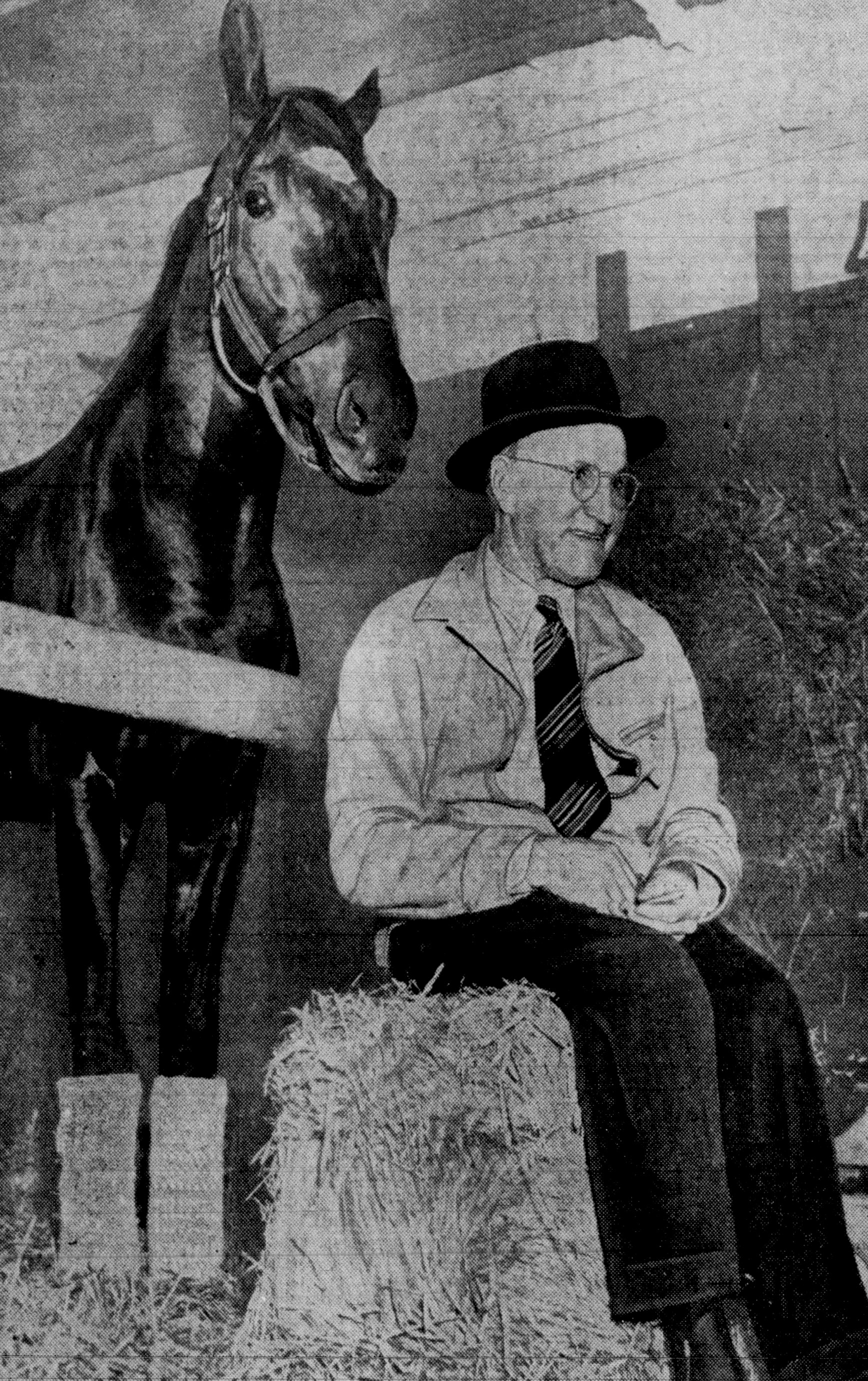
- Trainer Tom Smith with Kayak II, circa 1941
- Sire: Congreve
- Grandsire: Copyright
- Dam: Mosquita
- Damsire: Your Majesty
- Sex: Stallion
- Foaled: 1935
- Country: Argentina
- Colour: Dark Bay
- Breeder: Haras Ojo de Agua
- Owner: Charles S. Howard
- Trainer: R. Thomas Smith
- Record: 26: 14-8-1
- Earnings: $213,205

Major wins
- San Carlos Handicap (1939); Santa Anita Handicap (1939); American Handicap (1939); Hollywood Gold Cup (1939); Sunset Handicap (1940)

Awards
- U.S. Champion Handicap Male Horse (1939)
- Last updated on February 14, 2007

Kayak II (1935 – November 19??) was an Argentine-bred thoroughbred racehorse who competed successfully in the United States. He was sired by a famous Argentine thoroughbred named Congreve out of the dam Mosquita. After being seen by American Lindsay Howard during a polo trip to Argentina, Kayak was purchased for $7,000 along with another horse named Ligaroti. The horses were shipped back to California, where Howard's father, businessman Charles S. Howard, owned a successful racing stable that included 1938 U.S. Horse of the Year Seabiscuit. Lin Howard and his partner in Binglin Stable, singer Bing Crosby, raced Ligaroti, while Charles Howard raced Kayak. His original name was Kajak; Howard, however, renamed him. To avoid a conflict of names, the horse had to be registered in the U.S. as Kayak II.

Trained by R. Thomas Smith, he won 14 races and finished in the money in 23 of his 26 starts in the U.S. Substituting for injured stablemate Seabiscuit, Kayak II won the 1939 Santa Anita Handicap, then finished second to Seabiscuit in the 1940 edition. In his other major 1939 race, Kayak II lost to Challedon in the 1939 Pimlico Special at Pimlico Race Course in Baltimore, Maryland.

Kayak II was named the U.S. Champion Older Male Horse in 1939 in the earlier equivalent to today's Eclipse Awards.

== Pedigree ==
Pedigree of Kayak II, Dark Bay, 1935
Sire Congreve	Copyright	Tracery	Rock Sand
Sire Congreve	Copyright	Tracery	Topiary
Sire Congreve	Copyright	Rectify	William the Third
Sire Congreve	Copyright	Rectify	Simplify
Sire Congreve	Per Noi	Perrier	Persimmon
Sire Congreve	Per Noi	Perrier	Amphora
Sire Congreve	Per Noi	My Queen	Batt
Sire Congreve	Per Noi	My Queen	Princesa
Dam Mosquita	Your Majesty	Persimmon	St. Simon
Dam Mosquita	Your Majesty	Persimmon	Perdita
Dam Mosquita	Your Majesty	Yours	Melton
Dam Mosquita	Your Majesty	Yours	Your Grace
Dam Mosquita	La Mouche	Cyllene	Bona Vista
Dam Mosquita	La Mouche	Cyllene	Arcadia
Dam Mosquita	La Mouche	Asteria	Gay Hermit
Dam Mosquita	La Mouche	Asteria	Whirlwind (family: 3-b)
