= Pippermint =

Argentine Thoroughbred racehorse

- Sire: St Mirin
- Grandsire: Hermit
- Dam: Mostaza
- Damsire: Pepper and Salt
- Sex: Stallion
- Foaled: 1899
- Country: Argentina
- Colour: Grey
- Breeder: Haras San Jacinto (Saturnino J. Unzué)
- Owner: Caballeriza Escocés (Saturnino J. Unzué)

Major wins
- Polla de Potrillos (1902) Gran Premio Jockey Club (1902); Gran Premio Nacional (1902) Gran Premio Carlos Pellegrini (1902)

Pippermint (1899−1920) was an Argentine-bred Thoroughbred racehorse who was the first winner of the Argentine Triple Crown and Quadruple Crown.

== Background ==
St Mirin, Pippermint's sire, won several races in Great Britain before being exported to Argentina to stand at stud at Saturnino J. Unzué's Haras San Jacinto. Pippermint was bred by Unzué at Haras San Jacinto.

== Racing career ==
Pippermint was the leading horse in Argentina in 1902 with 11 wins and earnings of m$n141,560. During this year, he won the four races of the Argentine Quadruple Crown.

In 1903, Pippermint was sent to South Africa.

== Stud career ==
Pippermint returned to stand at stud at Haras San Jacinto. He led the Argentine broodmare sire list in 1932.

== Pedigree ==
Pedigree of Pippermint (ARG), grey stallion, foaled 1899
Sire St Mirin (GB) 1883	Hermit (GB); 1864	Newminster (GB)	Touchstone (GB)
Sire St Mirin (GB) 1883	Hermit (GB); 1864	Newminster (GB)	Beeswing (GB)
Sire St Mirin (GB) 1883	Hermit (GB); 1864	Seclusion (GB)	Tadmor (GB)
Sire St Mirin (GB) 1883	Hermit (GB); 1864	Seclusion (GB)	Miss Sellon (GB)
Sire St Mirin (GB) 1883	Lady Paramount (GB); 1870	Brother to Strafford (GB)	Young Melbourne (GB)
Sire St Mirin (GB) 1883	Lady Paramount (GB); 1870	Brother to Strafford (GB)	Gameboy Mare (GB)
Sire St Mirin (GB) 1883	Lady Paramount (GB); 1870	Toxophilite Mare (GB)	Toxophilite (GB)
Sire St Mirin (GB) 1883	Lady Paramount (GB); 1870	Toxophilite Mare (GB)	Maid of Masham (GB)
Dam Mostaza (GB) 1895	Pepper and Salt (GB); 1882	The Rake (GB)	Wild Dayrell (GB)
Dam Mostaza (GB) 1895	Pepper and Salt (GB); 1882	The Rake (GB)	England's Beauty (GB)
Dam Mostaza (GB) 1895	Pepper and Salt (GB); 1882	Oxford Mixture (GB)	Oxford (GB)
Dam Mostaza (GB) 1895	Pepper and Salt (GB); 1882	Oxford Mixture (GB)	Irish Belle (GB)
Dam Mostaza (GB) 1895	Strathfleet (GB); 1875	Scottish Chief (GB)	Lord of the Isles (GB)
Dam Mostaza (GB) 1895	Strathfleet (GB); 1875	Scottish Chief (GB)	Miss Ann (GB)
Dam Mostaza (GB) 1895	Strathfleet (GB); 1875	Masquerade (GB)	Lambourn (GB)
Dam Mostaza (GB) 1895	Strathfleet (GB); 1875	Masquerade (GB)	Burlesque (GB)
