= Congreve (horse) =

Argentine-bred Thoroughbred racehorse

- Sire: Copyright
- Grandsire: Tracery
- Dam: Per Noi
- Damsire: Perrier
- Sex: Stallion
- Foaled: 1924
- Country: Argentina
- Color: Bay
- Breeder: Haras El Pelado
- Owner: Caballeriza Pensamiento (Joaquin Noschesse & Roberto Carabajal)
- Trainer: Roberto Carabajal
- Record: 18: 11-1-4
- Earnings: m$n 247,571

Major wins
- Gran Premio Montevideo (1927); Gran Premio Polla de Potrillos (1927); Clásico Zubiaurre (1927); Gran Premio Carlos Pellegrini (1928); Clásico General Belgrano (1929); Clásico General Pueyrredon (1929); Clásico Chacabuco (1929); Clásico Municipal (1929); Clásico Vicente L. Cesares (1929, 1930)

Awards
- Leading sire in Argentina (1937, 1939, 1940, 1941, 1943, 1944, 1945); Leading broodmare sire in Argentina (1948, 1949, 1951, 1952, 1953)
- Last updated on October 13, 2020

Congreve (1924–1944) was an Argentine Thoroughbred racehorse and one of the most influential sires in South America. He was a bay stallion by Copyright (GB) (by Tracery, who was sired by Rock Sand) his dam Per Noi by Perrier (GB).

== Background ==
Congreve was bred by Haras El Pelado. His sire, Copyright, was a leading sire in Argentina.

== Racing record ==
Congreve raced over four seasons, from ages 3 to 6. During this time, he started 18 times for 11 wins and 5 places with winnings of 247,571 pesos. Winner of the Gran Premio Polla de Potrillos and Gran Premio Carlos Pellegrini, he was considered one of the best racehorses of his generation, despite soundness issues after an injury at the age of three.

== Stud career ==
The Haras Ojo de Agua stud in Argentina already had a good broodmare band when it purchased Congreve for stud duties. In his first few seasons at stud, Congreve was not bred to high class mares. Despite this, he quickly proved to be an excellent sire.

Congreve was the leading sire in Argentine on seven occasions (1937, 1939-1941, 1943-1945), ranked twice second (1935, 1942), third once (1936), and seventh once (1938). He was also ranked sixth on the United States sire list in 1939. Congreve headed the Argentine broodmare sire list five times (1948, 1949, 1951-1953).

During his stud career, he sired 177 winners, including at least 40 stakes winners, of nearly 600 races with total stakes earnings of over 5,567,992 pesos. Congreve is considered an Intermediate chef-de-race in the Roman-Miller dosage system.

=== Notable offspring ===
- Avestruz, winner of the 1943 Gran Premio Nacional
- Blackie, 1941 Argentinian Champion Three-Year-Old Filly, winner of the 1941 Gran Premio Polla de Potrancas, Gran Premio Selección, Gran Premio 25 de Mayo, and 1944 Gran Premio de Honor
- Bon Vin, 1941 Argentinian Horse of the Year, winner of the 1939 Gran Premio San Isidro, 1940 and 1941 Gran Premio de Honor, and 1941 Gran Premio Miguel Alfredo Martínez de Hoz
- Churrinche, 1944 Argentinian Champion Three-Year-Old Colt, winner of the 1944 Gran Premio Nacional and 1945 and 1946 Gran Premio de Honor, second on Argentinian general sire list in 1956 and third in 1955
- Dalilah, winner of the 1939 Gran Premio Polla de Potrancas and Gran Premio Selección
- Donna Bianca, winner of the Gran Premio Suipacha
- Embrujo, Argentinian Triple Crown winner, 1939 Argentinian Champion Three-Year-Old Colt, winner of the 1939 Gran Premo Polla de Potrillos, Gran Premio Jockey Club, Gran Premio Nacional, and 1940 Gran Premio General Pueyrredón, second on Argentine general sire list in 1951 and 1953, second on Argentine broodmare sire list in 1961 and 1965
- Ix, 1935 Argentinian Champion Three-Year-Old Colt, winner of the 1935 Gran Premio Jockey Club, Gran Premio Nacional, and Gran Premio Carlos Pellegrini
- Judea, winner of the 1940 Gran Premio Selección, Gran Premio 25 de Mayo, and Gran Premio San Isidro
- Kayak II, 1939 American Champion Handicap Male Horse, winner of the 1939 Hollywood Gold Cup, Santa Anita Handicap, San Carlos Handicap, American Handicap, and 1940 Sunset Handicap
- La Mission, Argentinian Quadruple Crown winner, 1940 Argentinian Champion Three-Year-Old Filly, winner of the 1940 Gran Premio Polla de Potrancas, Gran Premio Jockey Club, Gran Premio Nacional, Gran Premio Carlos Pellegrini, and Gran Premio Jorge de Atucha
- Medicis, 1936 Argentinian Champion Three-Year-Old Colt, winner of the 1936 Gran Premio Polla de Potrillos, Gran Premio Jockey Club, and Gran Premio Montevideo
- Murano, winner of the 1949 Gran Premio José Pedro Ramírez
- Quemaita, 1937 Argentinian Champion Three-Year-Old Filly, winner of the 1937 Gran Premio Nacional
- Uranio, winner of the 1948 Gran Premio José Pedro Ramírez, leading sire in Uruguay in 1958 and 1957
- Yamile (also known as Heil), winner of the 1939 Gran Premio Polla de Potrancas and Gran Premio Selección
- Zurrún, winner of the 1940 Gran Premio Polla de Potrillos

Congreve's progeny include eight Argentinian champions, six winners of the Gran Premio Nacional, four winners of the Gran Premio Polla de Potrancas, four winners of the Gran Premio Jockey Club, three winners of the Gran Premio Polla de Potrillos, three winners of the Gran Premio Selección, and two winners of the Gran Premio Carlos Pellegrini.

=== Notable offspring of daughters ===
- Yatasto, Argentine Quadruple Crown winner, Argentine Champion Two-Year-Old, Argentine Champion Three-Year-Old, Argentine Champion Older Horse, winner of the Gran Premio Carlos Pellegrini, Gran Premio de Honor (twice), etc.
- Empeñosa, Argentine Champion Three-Year-Old Filly, winner of the Gran Premio Selección, Gran Premio Polla de Potrancas, etc.
- Académico, Argentine Champion Three-Year-Old, Argentine Champion Older Horse, winner of the Gran Premio Carlos Pellegrini (twice), Gran Premio de Honor, Gran Premio José Pedro Ramírez, etc.
- La Rubia, Argentine Champion Older Mare, winner of the Gran Premio 25 de Mayo, Gran Premio Enrique Acebal, etc.
- Gualicho, Brazilian Champion Three-Year-Old, Brazilian Champion Older Horse, winner of the Grande Prêmio Brasil, etc.
- Jubilosa, winner of the Gran Premio Selección
- Mome, winner of the Gran Premio Selección
- Booz, winner of the Gran Premio de Honor, Clásico Miguel Alfredo Martínez de Hoz, etc.
- Bambino, winner of the Gran Premio San Isidro
- Sosiego, Champion Older Horse in Chile, winner of the Gran Premio Internacional de Chile, etc.
- Elixir, winner of the Gran Premio Carlos Pellegrini
- Volnay, winner of the Gran Premio Carlos Pellegrini
- Bambuca, winner of the Clásico Enrique Acebal, Clásico Gilberto Lerena, etc.
- Cancagua, winner of the Gran Premio Polla de Potrancas, Clásico Jorge Atucha, etc.
- Zulema, winner of the Clásico Las Oaks
- Genium, winner of the Gran Premio Maipú

== Pedigree ==
Pedigree of Congreve, bay stallion, 1924
Sire Copyright	Tracery	Rock Sand	Sainfoin
Sire Copyright	Tracery	Rock Sand	Roquebrune
Sire Copyright	Tracery	Topiary	Orme
Sire Copyright	Tracery	Topiary	Plaisanterie
Sire Copyright	Rectify	William the Third	St. Simon
Sire Copyright	Rectify	William the Third	Gravity
Sire Copyright	Rectify	Simplify	Arklow
Sire Copyright	Rectify	Simplify	Criosphinx
Dam Per Noi	Perrier	Persimmon	St. Simon
Dam Per Noi	Perrier	Persimmon	Perdita
Dam Per Noi	Perrier	Amphora	Amphion
Dam Per Noi	Perrier	Amphora	Sierra
Dam Per Noi	My Queen	Batt	Sheen
Dam Per Noi	My Queen	Batt	Vampire
Dam Per Noi	My Queen	Princesa	Esperanza
Dam Per Noi	My Queen	Princesa	Condesa (family: 1-o)
