= Gran Premio General San Martín =

Group 1 Argentine horse race

- Class: Group 1
- Location: Hipódromo Argentino de Palermo

Race information
- Distance: 2400 meters
- Surface: Turf
- Qualification: Four years old and up
- Weight: Weight for age
- Purse: $63,900,000 ARS (2026); 1st: $30,000,000 ARS

The Gran Premio General San Martín (previously known as the Premio General San Martín and Premio Otoño) is a Group 1 thoroughbred horse race run at Hipódromo Argentino de Palermo in Buenos Aires, Argentina, open to horses four years old or older. It is currently run over a distance of 2400 metres (1.5 mi) on the turf.

== History ==
In 1940, the race previously known as the Premio Otoño was renamed as the Premio General San Martín.

In the 1970s, the Gran Premio General San Martín was run over a distance of 3000 meters, or about 15 furlongs. When the graded stakes system was introduced in Argentina in 1972, the Gran Premio San Martín was a Group 3 race. By 1978, it was a Group 2 race, and it was upgraded to Group 1 status in 1979.

By 1988, the race had been shortened to a distance of 1800 meters and was run on the dirt. In 2013, the race was changed to be run over 2400 meters on the turf.

== Records since 1988 ==
Speed record:

- 2400 meters (current distance): 2:23.72 – Glorious Moment (2019)
- 1800 meters: 1:44.91 – Aristocity (2011)

Greatest winning margin:

- 7 lengths – Forty One (2017)

Most wins:

No horse has won the Gran Premio General San Martín more than once since 1988.

Most wins by a jockey:

- 5 – Jacinto R. Herrera (1998, 1999, 2001, 2003, 2006)
- 4 – Pablo Gusavo Falero (1994, 1997, 2005, 2017)
- 3 – Altair Domingos (2012, 2014, 2019)

Most wins by a trainer:

- 4 – Santillán G. Frenkel (1992, 1999, 2001, 2006)
- 3 – Juan Carlos Maldotti (1994, 1997, 2005)

Most wins by an owner:

No owner has won the Gran Premio General San Martín more than once since 1988.

Most wins by a breeder:

- 4 – Haras La Quebrada (1992, 1998, 2000, 2001)

== Winners since 1988 ==
Year	Winner	Age	Jockey	Trainer	Owner	Breeder	Distance	Surface	Time	Margin	Ref
2026	The Gladiator's Hat	6	Eduardo Ortega Pavón	Carlos D. Etchechoury	Haras El Angel de Venecia	Haras El Angel de Venecia	2400 meters	Turf	2:29.34	3 lengths	
2025	Acento Final	4	Kevin Banegas	Nicólas Martín Ferro	Stud Macul	Haras Pozo de Luna	2400 meters	Turf	2:32.79	1/2 length	
2024	El Kodigo	4	Gustavo E. Calvente	Juan Franco Saldivia	Juan Antonio	Haras Marovi	2400 meters	Turf	2:29.38	3/4 length	
2023	Pepe Joy	6	Juan Cruz Villagra	Gustavo Ernesto Romero	Stud El Chuchy	Haras La Biznaga	2400 meters	Turf	2:28.46	2 1/2 lengths	
2022	Miriñaque	6	F. Fernandes Gonçalves	María Cristina Muñoz	Stud Parque Patricios	Haras de la Pomme	2400 meters	Turf	2:29.22	Nose	
2021	Special Dubai	5	William Pereyra	Roberto A. Pellegatta	Stud Le Fragole	Haras La Esperanza	2400 meters	Turf	2:31.34	Head	
2020	Pinball Wizard	5	Juan Cruz Villagra	Jorge A. Mayansky Neer	Stud Don Teodoro	Haras Carampangue	2400 meters	Turf	2:26.77	1/2 length	
2019	Glorious Moment	4	Altair Domingos	Juan Manuel Etchechoury	Stud Las Monjitas	Haras El Gusy	2400 meters	Turf	2:23.72	1 1/2 lengths	
2018	Tiger Feet	4	F. Fernandes Gonçalves	Gustavo Ernesto Romero	Stud Tramo 20	Haras Santa Maria de Araras	2400 meters	Turf	2:29.12	3 lengths	
2017	Forty One	4	Pablo Gustavo Falero	José Luis Palacios	Stud Quereuquen	Haras Las Raices	2400 meters	Turf	2:29.75	7 lengths	
2016	Besitos	4	Juan Carlos Noriega	Roberto Pellegatta	Stud Pay Ubre	Haras Arcángel	2400 meters	Turf	2:28.34	Neck	
2015	Giacom	7	Cardenas E. Talaverano	Juan Roberto Gutiérrez	Haras Firmamento	Haras Firmamento	2400 meters	Turf	2:27.98	5 lengths	
2014	Ganesh	5	Altair Domingos	Carlos Roberto Giussi	Stud Red Rafa	Stud Red Rafa	2400 meters	Turf	2:34.45	1 1/2 lengths	
2013	Soy Carambolo	6	Juan Carlos Noriega	Andrés Eduardo Haim	Haras Polo	Haras Polo	2400 meters	Turf	2:32.88	1/2 neck	
2012	Flowing Rye	5	Altair Domingos	Daniel Alberto Bordon	Haras La Biznaga	Haras La Biznaga	1800 meters	Dirt	1:47.00	3/4 length	
2011	Aristocity	7	Cristian D. Menéndez	Roberto César Sosa	Stud Parapokos	Haras Atilena	1800 meters	Dirt	1:44.91	1/2 neck	
2010	Cocho	4	Jorge Antonio Ricardo	Juan Javier Etchechoury	Stud Rubio B.	Haras Abolengo	1800 meters	Dirt	1:45.90	1 1/2 lengths	
2009	Successful Affair	4	Horacio E. Karamanos	Alfredo F. Gaitán Dassié	Haras Futuro	Haras Futuro	1800 meters	Dirt	1:47.44	1/2 head	
2008	Flag Copado	5	Gustavo E. Calvente	Roberto Pellegatta	Stud Bingo Horse	Haras La Madrugada	1800 meters	Dirt	1:45.35	2 1/2 lengths	
2007	Latency	6	Julio César Méndez	Juan Bautista Udaondo	Haras Las Dos Manos	Haras Las Dos Manos	1800 meters	Dirt	1:46.06	Neck	
2006	Thano	4	Jacinto R. Herrera	Santillán G. Frenkel	Stud La Adelaida	Luis Hector Paccagnella	1800 meters	Dirt	1:47.16	3 lengths	
2005	Potro Rex	5	Pablo Gustavo Falero	Juan Carlos Maldotti	Haras La Madrugada	Haras La Madrugada	1800 meters	Dirt	1:48.59	1/2 length	
2004	Inter Cleante	4	Pedro Roberto Robles	Carlos D. Etchechoury	Stud S. de B.	Haras El Paraiso	1800 meters	Dirt	1:46.50	6 lengths	
2003	Abroquelado	4	Jacinto R. Herrera	Ernesto Eusebio Romero	Stud Gabigu	Alberto Lederman	1800 meters	Dirt	1:47.16	2 1/2 lengths	
2002	Climay	5	Ángel M. Ramírez	Alfredo F. Gaitán Dassié	Haras Río Claro	Haras Río Claro	1800 meters	Dirt	1:49.25	1 length	
2001	Flirteador	6	Jacinto R. Herrera	Santillán G. Frenkel	Stud General Lamadrid	Haras La Quebrada	1800 meters	Dirt	1:48.20	1 1/2 lengths	
2000	Magic Corner	5	Horacio J. Betansos	Juan Carlos Etchechoury	Stud Años Idos	Haras La Quebrada	1800 meters	Dirt	1:49.03	Head	
1999	Strudel Fitz	4	Jacinto R. Herrera	Santillán G. Frenkel	Stud Rin	Haras Firmamento	1800 meters	Dirt	1:48.92	2 1/2 lengths	
1998	El Compinche	7	Jacinto R. Herrera	Juan Carlos Etchechoury	Haras La Quebrada	Haras La Quebrada	1800 meters	Dirt	1:48.52	6 lengths	
1997	Body Glove	4	Pablo Gustavo Falero	Juan Carlos Maldotti	Stud Huguito	Haras Santa Lucia	1800 meters	Dirt	1:48.04	3/4 length	
1996	Fair Card	4	Carlos Alberto Zuco	Alberto J. Maldotti	Stud La Titina	Haras Income	1800 meters	Dirt	1:46.01	1/2 neck	
1995	Huido	5	Juan Guillermo Ublich	Aldo Omar Pappaterra	Stud San Gilberto	Cornelio Donovan & Eduar Solveyra	1800 meters	Dirt	1:48.21	4 lengths	
1994	Prince Boy	5	Pablo Gustavo Falero	Juan Carlos Maldotti	Stud San José del Socorro	Jorge Eugenio Tavares	1800 meters	Dirt	1:49.41	1 length	
1993	Cleante	4	Guillermo E. Sena	Vilmar Sanguinetti	Frank E. Whitham	Haras El Maracate	1800 meters	Dirt	1:49.00	5 lengths	
1992	Portoferraio	4	Walter Hugo Serrudo	Santillán G. Frenkel	Stud La Barranca	Haras La Quebrada	1800 meters	Dirt	1:48.76	Neck	
1991	Engrillado	4	Jorge Valdivieso	Pedro A. Moron	Stud Los Vascos	Claudio Rebolini	1800 meters	Dirt	1:48.36	3/4 length	
1990	Lad Cat	4	Miguel Ángel Abregú	Carlos D. Etchechoury	Haras Rosa do Sul		1800 meters	Dirt	1:49.64	1/2 neck	
1989	Magallon	4	Miguel Ángel Sarati	Geronimo V. Mercau			1800 meters	Dirt	1:51.49		
1988	Alververas	4		Luis Santiago Bedoya	Stud Alververas		1800 meters	Dirt	1:49.29		

== Earlier winners (incomplete) ==
- 1940: Bon Vin
- 1941: Encantador
- 1942: Tonto
- 1943: Banderín
- 1944: Gaztambide
- 1945: Respingo
- 1946: Red Fox
- 1947: Recién
- 1948: Saguaipe
- 1949: Vivilla
- 1950: Comanche
- 1951: Solano
- 1952: Circo
- 1953: Pamperito
- 1954: Rumbo
- 1955: Montmartre
- 1956: Tamurejo
- 1957: Dodó
- 1958: Espiche
- 1959: Magnum
- 1960: Misurf
- 1961: Mayocoi
- 1962: Catgut
- 1963: Semillón
- 1964: Cuentero
- 1965: All-Wise
- 1966: Aller
- 1967: El Taura
- 1968: Temporal
- 1969: Falstaff
- 1970: Francesco
- 1971: Juan Bueno
- 1972: Rio Tunuyan
- 1973: Cielo
- 1974: Hijodalgo
- 1975: Clever
- 1977: El Diurno
- 1978: Vacilante
- 1979: Ahmad
- 1980: Laurentis
- 1981: Hackman
- 1982: El Temido
- 1983: Guston
- 1984: Eglinton
- 1985: Mister Marco
- 1986: Caprice de Dieu
- 1987: Gorbot
