= Gran Premio Polla de Potrillos (Argentina) =

- Class: Group 1
- Inaugurated: 1895
- Race type: Flat / Thoroughbred

Race information
- Distance: 1600 meters (1 mi)
- Surface: Dirt
- Track: Hipódromo Argentino de Palermo
- Qualification: Three-Year-Old colts
- Weight: 56 kg
- Purse: $99,000,000 ARS (2026); 1st: $50,000,000 ARS

The Gran Premio Polla de Potrillos is a Group 1 flat horse race in Argentina open to three-year-old colts run over a distance of 1,600 metres (0.99 mi) at Hipódromo Argentino de Palermo. It is the first race in the Argentinian Triple Crown, and equivalent to the English 2000 Guineas Stakes. It is considered one of the principle races in defining the champion three-year-old colt, and generally occurs in September, near the beginning of a horse's three-year-old season.

== History ==
The Gran Premio Polla de Potrillos was first run in 1895, and has been run every year since then. Since its inauguration, its distance, surface, and location have not changed. In 1966, champion racehorse Forli won the race by 17 lengths in record time of 1:33 2/5. Due to the less accurate clocks of the time that only measured to a fifth of a second, this time may or may not be equivalent to the current speed record of 1:33.20.

Since 2016, the race has been run in conjunction with the Horse Parade art show, to promote the arts and raise money for non-profit organizations.

== Records (since 1988) ==
Speed record:

- 1:32.30 – American Tattoo (2018)
- 1:33.20 – Interprete (1991)

Largest margin of victory:

- 9 lengths – Refinado Tom (1996)

Most wins by a jockey:

- 4 – Pablo Gustavo Falero (2001, 2003, 2005, 2016)

Most wins by a trainer:

- 6 – Juan Carlos H. Etchechoury (1992, 1993, 1995, 1999, 2002, 2017)

Most wins by an owner:

- 2 – Haras La Biznaga (1993, 1996)
- 2 – Haras de la Pomme (1995, 1999)
- 2 – Haras Las Telas (1997, 1998)
- 2 – Ana Ruth (2005, 2006)

== Winners since 1988 ==
Year	Winner	Jockey	Trainer	Owner	Breeder	Time	Margin	Ref
2026	Linguado	Kevin Banegas	Edgardo Oscar Martucci	Stud 11 de Noviembre	Haras La Pasion	1:36.47	6 lengths	
2025	Gardel Pass	Gonzalo Damián Borda	María Fernanda Álvarez	Haras El Alfalfar	Haras El Alfalfar	1:34.46	Neck	
2024	Giustino	Eduardo Ortega Pavón	Marina Bragante López	Haras La Providencia	Haras La Providencia	1:36.10	Head	
2023	El Kodigo	Gustavo E. Calvente	Juan Franco Saldivia	Juan Antonio (BV)	Haras Marovi	1:33.14	Nose	
2022	El Musical	Juan Cruz Villagra	Miguel Ángel Cafere	Stud Mamina	Haras El Paraiso	1:32.35	1/2 length	
2021	Irwin	William Pereyra	Juan Franco Saldivia	Stud Volver Al Futuro (LP)	Haras Carampangue	1:35.05	2 lengths	
2020	Top One City	Cristian E. Velazquez	César Oscar Zapico	Stud Nuestras Hijas (LP)	Haras Firmamento	1:35.74	Nose	
2019	Miriñaque	Goncalves F. Fernandes	María Cristina Muñoz	Stud Parque Patricios	Haras de La Pomme	1:34.30	1/2 length	
2018	American Tattoo	Gustavo E. Calvente	Cascia Florentino S.	Juan Antonio (BV)	Haras La Pasion	1:32.30	4 lengths	
2017	The Great Day	Cabrera Luciano Emanuel	Juan Carlos H. Etchechoury	Haras El Firmamento	Haras Firmamento	1:33.84	3/4 length	
2016	In the Dark	Pablo Gustavo Falero	Santillan G. Frenkel	Stud Doña Pancha	Haras La Quebrada	1:32.60	6 lengths	
2015	Le Blues	Jose Aparecido Da Silva	Alfredo F. Gaitán Dassié	Haras Sta. Elena (LP)	Haras Vacacion	1:33.95	3 lengths	
2014	El Moises	Cardenas E. Talaverano	Vivas Gregorio Bernardo	Stud S.de B.	Haras Don Arcangel	1:35.13	Neck	
2013	Peten Itza	Cristian F. Quiles	Fravega Oscar Francisco	Stud La Fia-cca (SI)	Haras Gran Amigo	1:37.32	3 lengths	
2012	Sol Planet	Juan Cruz Villagra	Perez Sisto Hugo Miguel	Stud Yamandu (SI)	Haras La Macarena	1:34.36	1/2 length	
2011	Chuck Berry	Jorge Gustavo Ruiz Diaz	Roberto M.Bullrich	John Fulton	Haras La Quebrada	1:34.31	2 1/2 lengths	
2010	Es Corino	Cardenas E. Talaverano	Vera Carlos	Stud El Comite (LP)	Haras Vadarkblar	1:37.43	4 lengths	
2009	Don Valiente	Julio César Méndez	Etchechoury Carlos D.	Haras San Benito	Haras San Benito	1:33.37	1/2 length	
2008	Mi Amiguito	Julio César Méndez	Romero Ernesto Eusebio	Haras Y Stud Don Nico	Carlos Alberto Virgini Monayer	1:35.02	4 lengths	
2007	Ilusor	Gustavo E. Calvente	Roberto Pellegatta	Stud Aladino	Haras Vacacion	1:35.13	5 lengths	
2006	Dancing for Me	Fernando D. Lemma	Juan Carlos Viviani	Ana Ruth (LP)	Haras Arroyo de Luna	1:34.14	1 1/2 lengths	
2005	Gold for Sale	Pablo Gustavo Falero	Juan Carlos Viviani	Ana Ruth (LP)	Haras Arroyo de Luna	1:35.08	4 lengths	
2004	Urquell	Julio César Méndez	Jose Martins Alves	Haras La Providencia	Haras La Providencia	1:34.59	3 lengths	
2003	Fogoso Nov	Pablo Gustavo Falero	Oscar R. Mansilla	Tano de Ley (LP)	Haras Firmamento	1:34.80	1/2 length	
2002	Peasant	Roberto Robles Pedro	Juan Carlos H. Etchechoury	Stud La Frontera (MZA)	Julio Eduardo Perkins	1:33.32	1 length	
2001	Ice Point	Pablo Gustavo Falero	Juan Carlos Maldotti	Haras Vacacion	Haras Vacacion	1:34.81	4 lengths	
2000	City West	Juan Carlos Noriega	Roberto Pellegatta	Mariano A.	Haras Abolengo	1:35.52	4 lengths	
1999	Asidero	Cardenas E. Talaverano	Juan Carlos H. Etchechoury	Haras de La Pomme	Haras de La Pomme	1:35.29	6 lengths	
1998	Chevillard	Nestor N. Oviedo	Hector R. Pavarini	Haras Las Telas (LP)	Haras La Quebrada	1:37.50	3/4 length	
1997	Golfer	Francisco Arreguy	Raul Hugo Yalet	Haras Las Telas (LP)	Haras La Quebrada	1:34.47	Neck	
1996	Refinado Tom	Jorge Valdivieso	Roberto M. Bullrich	Haras La Biznaga	Haras La Biznaga	1:34.59	9 lengths	
1995	Gentlemen	Jacinto Rafael Herrera	Juan Carlos H. Etchechoury	Haras de La Pomme	Haras de La Pomme	1:34.48	2 1/2 lengths	
1994	Berliner	Jacinto Rafael Herrera	Juan Carlos Etchechoury	Andrea E.	Ceriani C. and Sara C. Ferrer Reyes	1:34.75	1 1/2 lengths	
1993	Bat Cana	Miguel Ángel Abregu	Juan Carlos H. Etchechoury	Haras La Biznaga	Haras La Biznaga	1:36.79	Nose	
1992	Valenti	Jorge S. Caro Araya	Juan Carlos H. Etchechoury	La Angostura (SI)	Haras Abolengo	1:36.49	Neck	
1991	Interprete	Walter H. Serrudo	Santillan G. Frenkel	Creole	Haras Abolengo	1:33.20	2 1/2 lengths	
1990	Oceanside	Jacinto Rafael Herrera	Carlos Alberto Zarlengo	Haras La Quebrada	Ceriani C. and Sara C. Ferrer Reyes	1:36.37		
1989	Royal Heroe	Miguel A. Sarati	Edgardo Oscar Martucci	La Recova		1:36.41	Neck	
1988	Ultrasonido		Luis A. Riviello	Don Henry	Haras El Turf	1:35.34		

== Earlier winners ==
- 1895: Tom Pouce
- 1896: Talma
- 1897: Balcarce
- 1898: Honor
- 1899: Dictador II
- 1900: Triboulet
- 1901: Porrazo
- 1902: Pippermint
- 1903: Roderick Dhu
- 1904: Old Man
- 1905: Pelayo
- 1906: Melgarejo
- 1907: Basalto
- 1908: Chopp
- 1909: Baratiere
- 1910: Larrea
- 1911: Saint Marceaux
- 1912: Inspector
- 1913: Duc de Maine
- 1914: Kick II
- 1915: Picacero
- 1916: Vadarkblar
- 1917: Botafogo
- 1918: Caricato
- 1919: Buen Ojo
- 1920: Lepanto
- 1921: Pulgarin
- 1922: Rico
- 1923: Ordenaza
- 1924: Capablancea
- 1925: Macón
- 1926: Gold Seeker
- 1927: Congreve
- 1928: Hechicero
- 1929: Tresiete
- 1930: Schopenhauer
- 1931: Mineral
- 1932: Correlo
- 1934: Silfo
- 1935: Rebaño
- 1936: Médicis
- 1937: Vino Puro
- 1938: Sorteado
- 1939: Embrujo
- 1940: Zurrún
- 1941: Gay Boy
- 1942: Halcón
- 1943: Black Out
- 1944: Adén
- 1945: Estuardo
- 1946: Remo
- 1947: Nigromante
- 1948: Quetzalcoatl
- 1949: Pancho Freddy
- 1950: Mirontón
- 1951: Yatasto
- 1952: Buscapié
- 1953: Profundo
- 1954: Dorón
- 1955: Tatán
- 1956: Solito
- 1957: Carapálida
- 1958: Manantial
- 1959: Panair
- 1960: Cachetero & Fiumé (DH)
- 1961: Nápoles
- 1962: Ukase
- 1963: Trousseau
- 1964: Gobernado
- 1965: Laconique
- 1966: Forli
- 1967: Gran Atleta
- 1968: Frescor
- 1969: Martinet
- 1970: Cipol
- 1971: Tropical Sun
- 1972: Mucho Sol
- 1973: Mariache
- 1974: Telefónico
- 1975: Ivanhoe III
- 1976: Paris
- 1977: Cipayo
- 1978: Telescópico
- 1979: Fabiolo
- 1980: Mountdrago
- 1981: Chirlazo
- 1982: Pinturicchio
- 1983: El Asesor
- 1984: Just In Case
- 1985: Sings
- 1986: El Serrano
- 1987: Pranke
