= Gran Premio Jockey Club (Argentina) =

- Class: Group 1
- Inaugurated: 1883
- Race type: Flat / Thoroughbred

Race information
- Distance: 2000 meters (1¼ mi)
- Surface: Turf
- Track: Hipódromo de San Isidro
- Qualification: Three-Year-Olds
- Weight: 56 kg
- Purse: $160,000,000 ARS (2026); 1st: $80,000,000 ARS

The Gran Premio Jockey Club (previously Premio Jockey Club, Gran Premio Productos Argentinos) is a Group 1 flat horse race in Argentina open to three-year-olds run over a distance of 2000 metres (1.2 mi) at Hipódromo de San Isidro. It is the second race in the Argentinian Triple Crown and is the oldest stakes race on the Argentinian calendar.

== History ==
The Gran Premio Jockey Club was first run in 1883 as the principal race organized by the Jockey Club de Buenos Aires. That first year it was restricted to fillies only, being opened to all horses the following year. It was originally run at the Hipódromo Argentino de Palermo. The race was moved to Hipódromo de San Isidro in 1955.

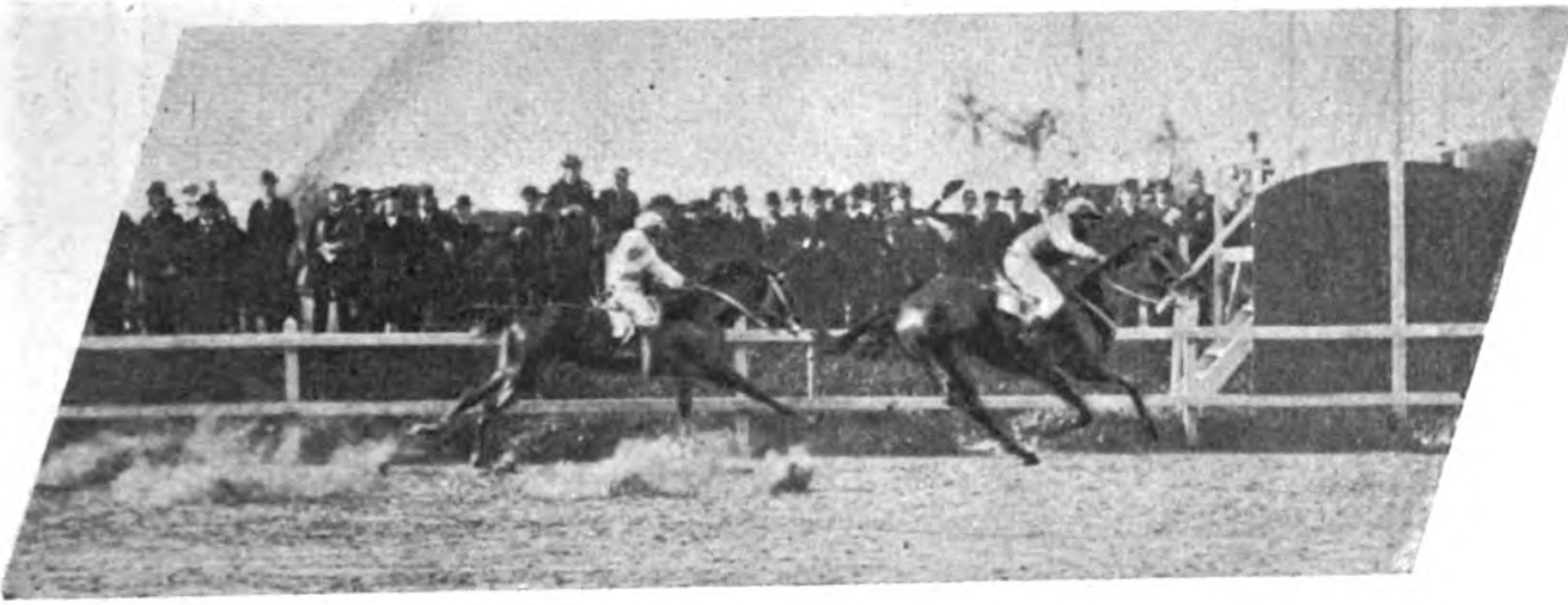
Pippermint winning the 1902 Premio Jockey Club

From 1883 to 1921, the race was known as the Premio Jockey Club. It was first run as the Gran Premio Jockey Club in 1922, and has been run under that name since then, except for 1953–1955, when it was run as the Gran Premio Productos Argentinos.

The Gran Premio Jockey Club has been run over a variety of distances:

- 1750 meters: 1883–1895
- 1800 meters: 1896–1897
- 2000 meters: 1898–1906, 1908–1973, 1979–
- 2200 meters: 1907, 1974–1978

In 1982, Fort de France set a world record for 2000 meters that lasted for over twenty years in winning the Gran Premio Jockey Club in a time of 1:57.1.

The 2022 disqualification of El Musical for interference with Natán resulted in violence and vandalism from patrons displeased with the result. The connections of El Musical were suspended.

== Records ==
Speed record:

- 2000 meters (current distance): 1:57.1 – Fort de France (1982) & L'Express (1991)
- 1750 meters: 1:50 – Ontario (1895)
- 1800 meters: 1:53 1/5 – Orange (1897)
- 2200 meters: 2:14 – Crest Pan (1976)

Largest margin of victory since 1988:

- 11 lengths – Ice Point (2001)

Longest odds winner since 1988:

- 47.10 – Zodiacal (2021)

Shortest odds winner since 1988:

- 1.65 – Ultrasonido (1988)
- 1.65 – Chullo (1997)

Most wins by a jockey since 1988:

- 4 – Pablo Gustavo Falero (2001, 2003, 2004, 2018)

Most wins by a trainer since 1988:

- 8 – Carlos D. Etchechoury (2006, 2007, 2008, 2017, 2020, 2022, 2023, 2026)
- 3 – Alfredo F. Gaitán Dassié (1995, 2009, 2011)
- 3 – Juan Carlos Etchechoury (1999, 2002, 2010)
- 3 – Juan Carlos Maldotti (2001, 2003, 2004)

Most wins by an owner:

- 4 – Haras El Turf (1908, 1969, 1974, 1977)
- 4 – Las Monjitas (2020, 2022, 2023, 2026)
- 3 – Haras Indecis (1894, 1915, 1942)
- 3 – Haras Don Gonzalo (1900, 1903, 1909)
- 3 – Haras Los Patrios (1939, 1947, 1954)

Most wins by a breeder since 1988:

- 4 – Haras Santa Maria de Araras (2003, 2008, 2016, 2017)
- 3 – Haras Futuro (2009, 2011, 2013)
- 3 – Haras Vacacion (2001, 2018, 2026)

== Winners since 1988 ==
Year	Winner	Jockey	Trainer	Owner	Breeder	Time	Margin	Ref
2026	Stay Tune	Cristian E. Velázquez	Carlos D. Etchechoury	Las Monjitas	Haras Vacacion	2:00.31	1 1 /2 lengths	
2025	Real Rim	Martin Valle	Juan Etchechoury	Haras Firmamento	Haras Firmamento	1:58.56	2 1 /2 lengths	
2024	Acento Final	Kevin Banegas	Nicolas Martín Ferro	Stud Macul	Haras Pozo de Luna	1:58.01	1 1 /2 lengths	
2023	Happy Happy Day	Brian Rodrigo Enrique	Carlos D. Etchechoury	Las Monjitas	Haras Firmamento	1:57.69	3 /4 length	
2022	Natán	Adrián M. Giannetti	Carlos D. Etchechoury	Las Monjitas	Haras Carampangue	2:01.30	Disqualification	
2021	Zodiacal	Luciano Emanuel Cabrera	Osvaldo Daniel Davila	Los Dago (LP)	Haras Phalaris S.R.L.	1:59.22	1 1 /2 lengths	
2020	Marignac	Adrián M. Giannetti	Carlos D. Etchechoury	Las Monjitas	Haras Santa Ines	2:00.42	1 1 /2 lengths	
2019	Roman Joy	Eduardo Ortega Pavón	Juan Manuel Etchechoury	Haras El Angel de Venecia (SFE)	Haras La Biznaga	2:08.19	1 /2 neck	
2018	Imagen de Roma	Pablo Gustavo Falero	Lucas Francisco Gaitan	Sta. Elena (LP)	Haras Vacacion	2:00.82	1 /2 head	
2017	Village King	Gonzalo E. Bellocq	Carlos D. Etchechoury	Haras El Angel de Venecia (SFE)	Haras Santa Maria de Araras	1:58.91	1 /2 head	
2016	He Runs Away	Rodrigo Gonzalo Blanco	Gustavo Ernesto Romero	The Guante (LP)	Haras Santa Maria de Araras	1:59.75	2 1 /2 lengths	
2015	Hi Happy	Altair Domingos	Pedro Nickel	Haras La Providencia	Haras La Providencia	1:59.15	1 1 /2 lengths	
2014	Blues Traveler	Juan Carlos Noriega	Miguel Ángel Suárez	Alegria	Haras Abolengo	2:02.37	3 lengths	
2013	Ecologo	Francisco Raúl Corrales	Nicolas Alfredo Gaitán	Haras Futuro	Haras Futuro	2:00.23	Neck	
2012	Indy Point	Gonzalo Hahn	Raul Alberto Ramallo	Gus-May-Fer (LP)	Felipe Lovisi	1:58.25	2 lengths	
2011	Suggestive Boy	Eduardo Ortega Pavón	Alfredo F. Gaitán Dassié	Haras Pozo de Luna	Haras Futuro	1:58.14	2 1 /2 lengths	
2010	Anaerobio	Julio César Méndez	Juan Carlos Etchechoury	La Frontera (MZA)	Haras La Madrugada	1:59.62	2 lengths	
2009	Interaction	Cardenas E. Talaverano	Alfredo F. Gaitán Dassié	Haras Futuro	Haras Futuro	1:58.47	1 /2 head	
2008	City Banker	Facundo Yamil Jarcovsky	Carlos D. Etchechoury	El Gusy	Haras Santa Maria de Araras	1:57.27	6 lengths	
2007	Indio Glorioso	Julio César Méndez	Carlos D. Etchechoury	S. de B.	Haras de la Pomme	2:01.88	3 lengths	
2006	Gran Estreno	Rodrigo Gonzalo Blanco	Carlos D. Etchechoury	Chelsea	Eduardo Carlos Luther	2:00.73	Neck	
2005	Forty Licks	Horacio Julian Betansos	Roberto Pellegatta	El Wing (SI)	Haras Arroyo de Luna	1:58.75	1 1 /2 lengths	
2004	Latency	Pablo Gustavo Falero	Juan Carlos Maldotti	Haras Las Dos Manos	Haras Las Dos Manos	1:59.80	2 lengths	
2003	Lancettier	Pablo Gustavo Falero	Juan Carlos Maldotti	Haras Santa Maria de Araras	Haras Santa Maria de Araras	1:59.63	3 1 /2 lengths	
2002	Peasant	Pedro Roberto Robles	Juan Carlos Etchechoury	La Frontera (MZA)	Julio Eduardo y Perkins	1:58.47	1 /2 neck	
2001	Ice Point	Pablo Gustavo Falero	Juan Carlos Maldotti	Haras Vacacion	Haras Vacacion	2:02.21	11 lengths	
2000	City West	Juan Carlos Noriega	Roberto Pellegatta	Mariano A.	Haras Abolengo	1:58.81	1 1 /2 lengths	
1999	Asidero	Cardenas E. Talaverano	Juan Carlos Etchechoury	Haras de la Pomme	Haras de la Pomme	1:58.64	4 lengths	
1998	Have a Champ	Jacinto Rafael Herrera	Edmundo G. Fonseca	El Establo (LP)	Haras Firmamento	1:57.92	2 lengths	
1997	Chullo	Oscar Fabián Conti	Eduardo M. Martínez De Hoz	Haras San Pablo	Haras San Pablo	1:59.19	2 1 /2 lengths	
1996	Refinado Tom	Jorge Valdivieso	Roberto M. Bullrich	Haras La Biznaga	Haras La Biznaga	2:00.47	1 1 /2 lengths	
1995	Espirro	Juan José Paule	Alfredo F. Gaitán Dassié	Haras El Manzanar	Haras El Manzanar	1:58.61	1 1 /2 lengths	
1994	El Sembrador	Guillermo Enrique Sena	José Luis Palacios	Andrea E.	Haras El Paraiso	1:58.2	2 1 /2 lengths	
1993	Huido	Luis Alberto Triviño	Enrique Clerc	San Gilberto (LP)	Cornelio y Solveyra Eduar Donovan	2:00.2		
1992	Mr. Light Tres	Juan Alberto Maciel	Antonio Derli Gómez	La Buena Estrella	Ruben Oscar Prieto	1:58.1	2 1 /2 lengths	
1991	L'Express	José Luis Batruni	Ángel Adami	La Borinqueña	Haras La Borinqueña	1:57.1	1 1 /2 lengths	
1990	Algenib	Miguel Ángel Sarati	Ernesto Eusebio Romero	El Galo	El Galo S.A.	2:00.4		
1989	Autentico	Fabian Antonio Rivero	Luis A. Quinteros	El Globito (LP)		1:58.1	1 1 /2 lengths	
1988	Ultrasonido	Vilmar Sanguinetti	Luis A. Riviello	Don Henry	Haras El Turf	2:02.3		

== Earlier winners ==
- 1883: Naná ƒ
- 1884: Miss Palmer ƒ
- 1885: Beausoleil
- 1886: Hawk Eye
- 1887: Lenapé ƒ
- 1888: Marinera ƒ
- 1889: Ministro
- 1890: San Martin
- 1891: Amianto
- 1892: Rivadavia
- 1893: Malakoff
- 1894: Langero
- 1895: Ontario
- 1896: Purrán
- 1897: Orange
- 1898: Le Sancy
- 1899: Valero
- 1900: Cordon Rouge
- 1901: Urunday
- 1902: Pippermint
- 1903: Américo
- 1904: Old Man
- 1905: Pelayo
- 1906: Melgarejo
- 1907: Orinoco
- 1908: Chopp
- 1909: Casiopea ƒ
- 1910: Espirita ƒ
- 1911: Volador
- 1912: Balboa
- 1913: Asturiano
- 1914: Avicenia ƒ
- 1915: Ocurrencia ƒ
- 1916: Vadarkblar
- 1917: Botafogo
- 1918: Caricato
- 1919: Buen Ojo*
- 1920: Calderón
- 1921: Agüeros
- 1922: Rico
- 1923: La Patria ƒ
- 1924: Lombardo
- 1925: Pedantón
- 1926: Rubens
- 1927: Bermejo
- 1928: Pibería ƒ
- 1929: Cocles
- 1930: Sierra Balcarce ƒ
- 1931: Mineral
- 1932: Payaso
- 1933: Orégano
- 1934: Silfo
- 1935: Ix
- 1936: Médicis
- 1937: Rolando
- 1938: Sorteado
- 1939: Embrujo
- 1940: La Mission ƒ
- 1941: Bubalcó
- 1942: Tónico & A Volonté (dead heat)
- 1943: Filón
- 1944: Guatán
- 1945: Estuardo
- 1946: Seductor
- 1947: Nigromante
- 1948: Cruz Montiel
- 1949: Kentucky
- 1950: Albarracin
- 1951: Yatasto
- 1952: Branding
- 1953: Pontino
- 1954: Basajuan
- 1955: Tatán
- 1956: Pipote
- 1957: Carapálida
- 1958: Manantial
- 1959: Mamboretá
- 1960: Pechazo
- 1961: Marista
- 1962: Huxley
- 1963: Snow Bluff
- 1964: Gobernado
- 1965: Tai
- 1966: Forli
- 1967: El Califa
- 1968: Mondragón
- 1969: Practicante
- 1970: Cipol
- 1971: Indian Good
- 1972: Dimbokro
- 1973: Moraes Tinto
- 1974: El Gran Capitán
- 1975: Full of Wine
- 1976: Crest Pan
- 1977: Farnesio
- 1978: Telescópico
- 1979: Duero
- 1980: Mountdrago
- 1981: Tello
- 1982: Fort de France
- 1983: Ball Fighter
- 1984: Reverente
- 1985: Bonsoir
- 1986: El Serrano
- 1987: Monte Simón

*Won by disqualification of Tiny

ƒ Indicates a filly
