= Gran Premio Gilberto Lerena =

G1 horse race in Argentina

- Class: Group 1
- Inaugurated: 1905

Race information
- Distance: 2200 meters
- Surface: Turf
- Track: Hipódromo Argentino de Palermo
- Qualification: Three-year-olds and up fillies and mares
- Weight: Weight for Age
- Purse: $21,000,000 ARS (2024); 1st: $10,000,000 ARS

The Gran Premio Gilberto Lerena (previously known as the Premio Abril, Premio Old Man, Clásico Gilberto Lerena and Premio Gilberto Lerena) is a Group 1 horse race run at Hipódromo Argentino de Palermo in Buenos Aires, Argentina, open to fillies and mares three years old or older. It is currently run over a distance of 2200 metres (1.4 mi) on the turf.

== History ==
The Gran Premio Gilberto Lerena was inaugurated in 1905 as the Premio Abril. In 1914, the race was renamed to the Gran Premio Gilberto Lerena in honor of Gilberto Justiniano Lerena Lenguas, a co-founder of the Argentine Stud Book who bred Argentinian Quadruple Crown winner Old Man and was associated with various famous and successful studs, including Stud Oriental, Stud Bend Or, Haras La Guardia, Haras El Moro, Haras Las Ortigas, and his own Haras El Viejo. The race ran as the Premio Old Man in 1954 and 1955.

The Gran Premio Gilberto Lerena has been run at a variety of distances, including:

- 1600 meters (1918–2007)
- 2000 meters (2008–2012)
- 2200 meters (2013–present)

When the group race system was introduced in Argentina in the 1973/4 season, the Gran Premio Gilberto Lerena was a Group 3 race. In 1976, it was still a Group 3. From 1988 to 1994, the Gran Premio Gilberto Lerena was run as a Group 2 race. In 1995 it was upgraded to Group 1, a designation it has since retained.

In 1990 and 1991, the race was restricted to horses that had won at least one race.

In 2020, due to the COVID-19 pandemic, the race was not run.

The Gran Premio Gilberto Lerena is the second jewel of the Campeonato Palermo de Oro ® for fillies and mares, after the Group 2 Premio Clásico Arturo R. y Arturo Bullrich and before the Group 1 Gran Premio Criadores.

== Records since 1988 ==
Speed record:

- 2200 meters (current distance): 2:10.48 – Belleza de Arteaga (2023)
- 1600 meters: 1:33.08 – Southern Filly (1994)
- 2000 meters: 2:01.39 – Malpensa (2011)

Greatest winning margin:

- 8 lengths – Malpensa (2011)

Most wins:

Since 1988, no horse has won the Gran Premio Gilberto Lerena more than once. Prior to that, the race was won twice by La Ñatita (1915, 1917), Black Beauty (1923, dead heat in 1924), Palanca (1936, 1937), Et Bien! (1954, 1955), and Dorine (1962, 1963).

Most wins by a jockey:

- 3 – Juan Carlos Noriega (1994, 2007, 2009)
- 3 – Jacinto R. Herrera (1997, 1998, 2000)

Most wins by a trainer:

- 5 – Juan Carlos Etchechoury (1994, 1997, 1999, 2001, 2019)
- 4 – Juan Carlos Maldotti (2002, 2004, 2007, 2009)
- 3 – José Luis Palacios (1995, 2014, 2018)

Most wins by an owner:

- 4 – Haras Santa Maria de Araras (1992, 2012, 2013, 2021)

Most wins by a breeder:

- 4 – Haras Santa Maria de Araras (1992, 2012, 2013, 2021)
- 4 – Haras La Quebrada (1994, 1997, 2000, 2001)

== Winners since 1988 ==
Year	Winner	Age	Jockey	Trainer	Owner	Breeder	Distance	Time	Margin	Group	Ref
2026	Cannolina	3	Brian Rodrigo Enrique	Alberto Manuel Lopéz	Stud 1912	Antonio Di Sanzo	2200 meters	2:19.02	4 lengths	I	
2025	Ceniza Pampa	3	Kevin Banegas	Edgardo Pablo Martucci	Pedro Rodolfo	Ángel Terenziani Abel	2200 meters	2:14.86	1 1/2 lengths	1	
2024	Ballado's Beach	5	Adrián M. Giannetti	Juan Manuel Etchechoury	Haras Las Monjitas	Haras El Gusy	2200 meters	2:12.52	1 1/2 lengths	1	
2023	Belleza de Arteaga	5	William Pereyra	Roberto Pellegatta	Stud Chos Malal	Haras Bioart	2200 meters	2:10.48	2 lengths	1	
2022	Wild Ones	5	Gabriel L. Bonasola	Nicólas Martín Ferro	Stud Campos de Araujo	Haras La Leyenda de Areco	2200 meters	2:13.41	2 lengths	1	
2021	Fanciful	5	Rodrigo G. Blanco	Juan Manuel Etchechoury	Haras Santa Maria de Araras	Haras Santa Maria de Araras	2200 meters	2:14.93	1/2 length	1	
2020	Race not run										
2019	American Song	5	José A. Da Silva	Juan Carlos Etchechoury	Stud Rubio B.	Haras La Pasión	2200 meters	2:13.48	1/2 length	1	
2018	La Extraña Dama	4	Eduardo Ortega Pavón	José Luis Palacios	Haras de la Pomme	Haras de la Pomme	2200 meters	2:17.79	6 lengths	1	
2017	Kiriaki	4	Gustavo E. Calvente	Juan Bautista Udaondo	Haras Santa Inés	Haras Santa Inés	2200 meters	2:14.03	1 1/2 lengths	1	
2016	Conviction	4	Eduardo Ortega Pavón	Marcelo Vivas Rubén	Stud Los Moure	Haras Orilla del Monte	2200 meters	2:19.36	2 1/2 lengths	1	
2015	Furia Cruzada	3	Juan Cruz Villagra	Alfredo F. Gaitán Dassié	Haras Cachagua	Haras Dadinco	2200 meters	2:18.19	2 1/2 lengths	1	
2014	Malacostumbrada	3	Juan Cruz Costa	José Luis Palacios	Stud San Jupe	Haras La Pasion	2200 meters	2:16.78	4 lengths	1	
2013	Candy Marie	3	Rodrigo G. Blanco	Carlos D. Etchechoury	Haras Santa Maria de Araras	Haras Santa Maria de Araras	2200 meters	2:15.90	1/2 length	1	
2012	Malibu Queen	3	Walter Ariel Aguirre	Juan Sebastian Maldotti	Haras Santa Maria de Araras	Haras Santa Maria de Araras	2000 meters	2:02.26	1/2 neck	1	
2011	Malpensa	4	Adrián M. Giannetti	Juan Bautista Udaondo	Haras Santa Inés	Haras Santa Inés	2000 meters	2:01.39	8 lengths	1	
2010	Ollagua	4	Altair Domingos	José Martins Alves	Haras La Providencia	Haras La Providencia	2000 meters	2:01.60	2 lengths	1	
2009	Cayaya	3	Juan Carlos Noriega	Juan Carlos Maldotti	Stud Tombo		2000 meters	2:02.49	1/2 length	1	
2008	Luna Arrabalera	5	Mario Rubén Nuñez	Hugo Daniel Sanagua	Haras Ni Manor	Haras Ni Manor	2000 meters	2:02.20	1 length	1	
2007	Estricta	3	Juan Carlos Noriega	Juan Carlos Maldotti	Stud La Esperanza	Haras Vacacion	1600 meters	1:33.21	2 1/2 lengths	1	
2006	Carla Stripes	3	Gustavo E. Calvente	Roberto Pellegatta	Haras Melincué	Haras Melincué	1600 meters	1:34.86	2 1/2 lengths	1	
2005	Postergada	3	José Ricardo Méndez	Eduardo Carlos Tadei	Stud Chopp	Haras Abolengo	1600 meters	1:33.97	3 lengths	1	
2004	Salt Champ	3	Pablo Gustavo Falero	Juan Carlos Maldotti	Stud E.V.G.		1600 meters	1:35.18	Head	1	
2003	Miss Loren	4	Edgardo Gramática	Miguel Ángel García	Haras Firmamento	Haras Firmamento	1600 meters	1:34.69	1/2 neck	1	
2002	Slew the Moon	5	Pablo Gustavo Falero	Juan Carlos Maldotti	Haras Vacacion	Haras Vacacion	1600 meters	1:37.27	1/2 neck	1	
2001	Real Number	3	Jorge Valdivieso	Juan Carlos Etchechoury	Haras La Quebrada	Haras La Quebrada	1600 meters	1:36.12	1 1/2 lengths	1	
2000	Mi Sureña	3	Jacinto R. Herrera	Domingo Elías Pascual	Stud Bonaventura	Haras La Quebrada	1600 meters	1:34.91	5 lengths	1	
1999	Speeding Star	3	Julio César Méndez	Juan Carlos Etchechoury	Haras Orilla del Monte		1600 meters	1:36.23	5 lengths	1	
1998	Giulie-Halo	4	Jacinto R. Herrera	Ernesto Eusebio Romero	Stud Monte Mayor		1600 meters	1:37.22	1/2 neck	1	
1997	Rimel	5	Jacinto R. Herrera	Juan Carlos Etchechoury	Haras La Quebrada	Haras La Quebrada	1600 meters	1:37.38	5 lengths	1	
1996	Syzygy	5	Oscar Fabian Conti	Eduardo M. Martínez de Hoz	Haras Comalal	Haras Comalal	1600 meters	1:36.06	1 1/2 lengths	1	
1995	La Olla	3	Horacio E. Karamanos	José Luis Palacios	Stud El Doguito	Haras Comalal	1600 meters	1:35.12	1/2 head	1	
1994	Southern Filly	3	Juan Carlos Noriega	Juan Carlos Etchechoury	Stud Forego	Haras La Quebrada	1600 meters	1:33.08	1/2 neck	2	
1993	Pescara	3	Daniel Jorge Ojeda	Antonio Derli Gómez	Stud Bakota		1600 meters	1:36.14	2 lengths	2	
1992	So Lovely	4	Miguel Angel Sarati	Domingo Elías Pascual	Haras Santa Maria de Araras	Haras Santa Maria de Araras	1600 meters	1:38.44	Neck	2	
1991	La Charlatana	3	Jorge Valdivieso		Haras La Biznaga	Haras La Biznaga	1600 meters	1:34.90		2	
1990	Fail	3	Edgardo Gramática	Juan Alberto Maldotti	Stud La Titina		1600 meters	1:35.67		2	
1989	La Brea	6	Rodolfo Rivero Roque	Alfonso L. Salvati	Stud Jorge de Atucha		1600 meters	1:36.87	Head	2	
1988	Black Sheep	3	Miguel Angel Sarati	Edgardo Oscar Martucci	Stud Nebek		1600 meters			2	

== Earlier winners (incomplete) ==
- 1905: Magnética
- 1906: Primera Tiple
- 1907: Olinda
- 1908: Rancagua
- 1909: Scila
- 1910: Polilla
- 1911: Emilunga
- 1912: Aphrodite
- 1913: Two Step
- 1914: Indiecita
- 1915: La Ñatita
- 1916: Felpilla
- 1917: La Ñatita
- 1918: Divinidad
- 1919: Su Majestad
- 1920: Fanfarrona
- 1921: Carmuchita
- 1922: Bigornia
- 1923: Black Beauty
- 1924: Black Beauty & Sierra Leona (DH)
- 1925: Japónica
- 1926: Nota Alegre
- 1927: Pethy
- 1928: Hill
- 1929: Bizantina
- 1930: Monserga
- 1931: Pilca
- 1932: Côte d'Or
- 1933: Rudeza
- 1934: Retorta & Nereida (DH)
- 1935: Black Arrow
- 1936: Palanca
- 1937: Palanca
- 1938: Goleada
- 1939: Mandataria
- 1940: Giudeca
- 1941: Miss Viola
- 1942: Xanthis
- 1943: Ridere
- 1944: Platería
- 1945: Quelinda
- 1946: Half Crown
- 1947: Niña Bruja
- 1948: Luna Llena
- 1949: Lina
- 1950: Misia
- 1951: Bambuca
- 1952: Écoutez!
- 1953: Cablística
- 1954: Et Bien!
- 1955: Et Bien!
- 1956: Balkh
- 1957: Titania
- 1958: Precinta
- 1959: Ilonka
- 1960: Nicosia
- 1961: Medina
- 1962: Dorine
- 1963: Dorine
- 1964: Rabonera
- 1965: Venturanza
- 1966: Nell Gwynne
- 1967: Pastilla
- 1968: Yanina
- 1969: Su Alteza
- 1970: Brane
- 1971: Auxey
- 1972: Jungle Duchess
- 1973: Bacami
- 1974: Imaginada
- 1976: Good Bet
