= Grande Prêmio São Paulo =

Race for thoroughbred horses

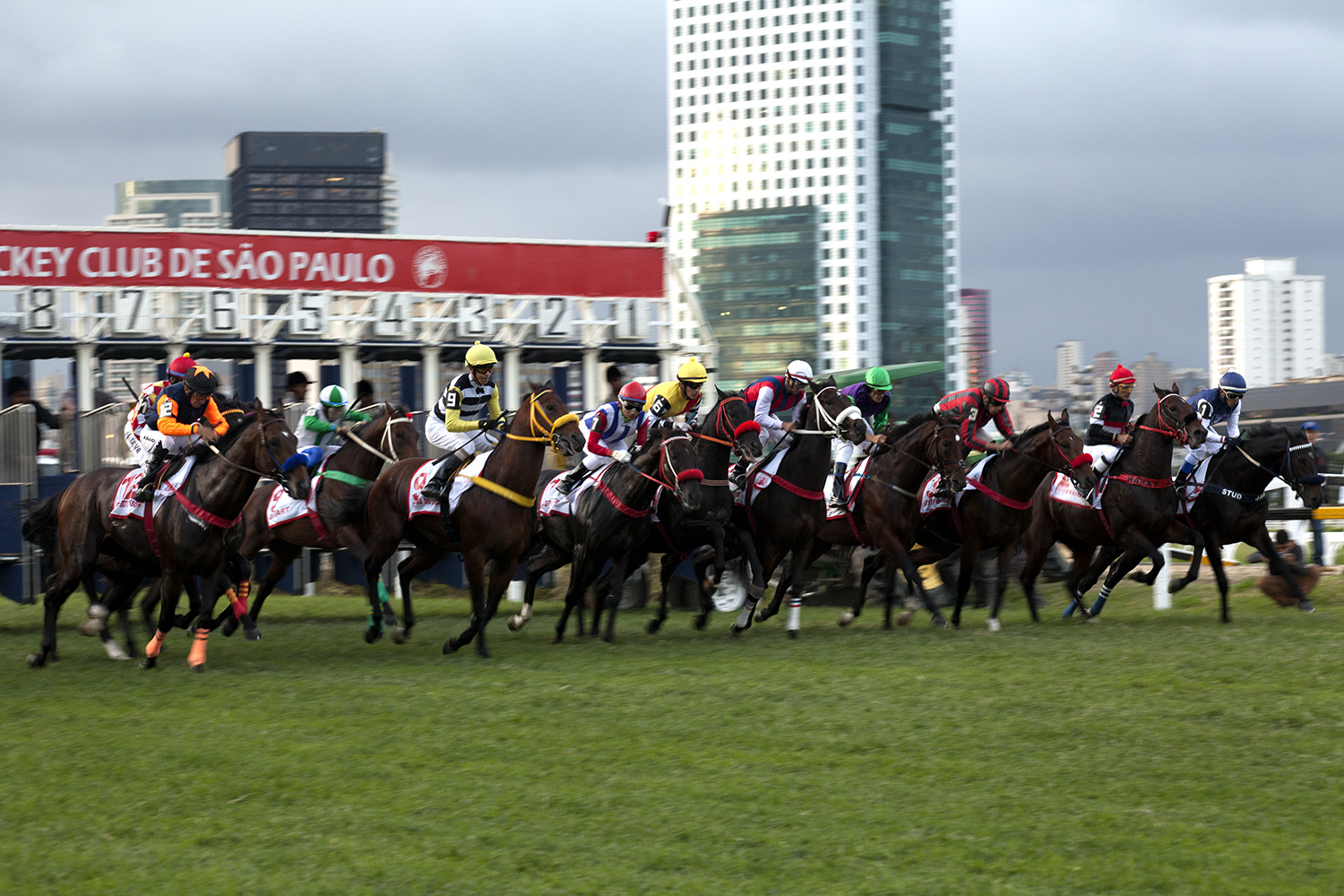
- The start of the 2017 Grande Prêmio São Paulo
- Class: Grade I
- Location: Hipódromo de Cidade Jardim; São Paulo, Brazil
- Inaugurated: 1923
- Race type: Thoroughbred

Race information
- Distance: 2,400 meters (approx. 1 1/2 miles; 12 furlongs)
- Surface: Turf
- Track: left-handed
- Qualification: 3-year-olds and up
- Weight: Assigned
- Purse: R$150,000

The Grande Prêmio São Paulo is a Group 1 Brazilian race for thoroughbred horses 3 years old or older.

It is the most important race in the São Paulo racing calendar, and one of the most important in the Brazilian racing calendar.

== History ==
The Grande Prêmio São Paulo was first run in 1923 and was won by the Argentinian import Mehemet Ali. The race was originally run over a distance of 3200 meters and was shortened to 3000 meters in 1948 and again to 2400 meters in 1958.

== Records since 2000 ==
Speed Record:

- 2:24.35 – Kenlova (2024)

Most wins:

No horse has won this race more than once since 2000.

Prior to 2000, Gualicho won in 1952 and 1953, Adil won in 1955 and 1956, and Arturo A. won in 1961 and 1962.

Most wins by a jockey:

- 2 – W. Blandi (2002, 2009)
- 2 – Jorge Ricardo (2005, 2021)

Most wins by a trainer:

- 4 – Venãncio Nahid (2008, 2009, 2010, 2012)
- 2 – Dulcino Guignoni (2000, 2011)
- 2 – Roberto Solanes (2016, 2019)
- 2 – Mário André (2018, 2021)

Most wins by an owner:

- 3 – Stud TNT (2005, 2010, 2017)
- 2 – Haras Regina (2016, 2019)

== Winners ==
Year	Winner	Age	Jockey	Trainer	Owner	Breeder	Time	Refs
2026	Quero Te Mucho	7	F. Larroque	T. Haidar	Haras Philipson	Haras Philipson	2:26.47	
2025	Dream Alliance	3	V. Borges	M. F. Gusso	Fazenda Mondesir	Fazenda Mondesir	2:27.278	
2024	Kenlova ƒ	4	F. Leandro	Emerson Garcia	Stud Magia	Stud Magia	2:24.357	
2023	Doutor Sureño	4	Marcos Ribeiro	Victorio Fornasaro	Haras Moema	Haras Old Friends	2:24.606	
2022	Roxoterra	4	Jeane Alves	Emerson Garcia	Haras Fazenda Boa Vista	Haras Fazenda Boa Vista	2:25.790	
2021	Head Office	4	Jorge Ricardo	Mário André	Stud Alessio & Naeula	Haras Santa Maria de Araras	2:27.226	
2020	George Washington	5	H. Fernandes	L. Esteves	Stud Happy Again	Stud TNT	2:29.186	
2019	Olympic Hollywood	5	Wesley S. Cardoso	Roberto Solanes	Haras Regina	Haras Regina	2:25.482	
2018	Euquemando	4	A. L. Silva	Mário André	Haras Chello	Haras Anderson	2:25.455	
2017	Ceu de Brigadeiro	4	M.S. Machado	Edison Alexandre and Luis Alberto Danielian	Stud TNT	Stud TNT	2:31.228	
2016	Universal Law	4	V. Borges	Roberto Solanes	Haras Regina	Haras Cruz de Pedra	2:26.39	
2015	Quinhao	3	A. Gulart	M. Ferreira	Stud Blue Mountain	Haras LLC	2:25.875	
2014	Jaspion Silent	3	A. Domingos	Olavo Jerônimo	Sonia Marques Samaja	Gianni Franco Samaja	2:25.50	
2013	Gober	3	N. A. Santos	R. Soares	Stud Red Rafa	Stud Red Rafa	2:29.34	
2012	Invictus	3	J. Aparecido	Venãncio Nahid	Beverly Hills Stud	Beverly Hills Stud	2:26.34	
2011	Timeo	4	M. Mazini	Dulcino Guignoni	Stud Yatasto	Haras São José da Serra	2:25.11	
2010	Sal Grosso	3	L. Duarte	Venãncio Nahid	Stud TNT	Stud TNT	2:25.99	
2009	Flymetothemoon	3	W. Blandi	Venãncio Nahid	Haras Doce Vale	Haras Doce Vale	2:26.91	
2008	Jeune-Turc	3	T. J. Pereira	Venãncio Nahid	Stud CED	Haras Fronteira PAP	2:27.10	
2007	Quick Road	3	M. Cardoso	J. Macedo	Stud JCM	Haras Santa Maria de Araras	2:32.18	
2006	Dono da Raia	3	M. Gonçalves	Antonio L. Cintra	Stud Mictik	Haras São Quirino	2:24.49	
2005	Macbeth	3	Jorge Ricardo	C. Silva	Stud TNT	Stud TNT	2:24.59	
2004	Cheikh	6	N. Cunha	Victor Barbosa	Haras São José & Expedictus	Haras São José & Expedictus	2:29.85	
2003	Gene de Campeão	3	A. Mesquita	Amasilio Magalhães, Jr.	Haras Bandeirantes	Haras Bandeirantes	2:25.45	
2002	Uapybo	3	W. Blandi	Mário R. Campos	Stud Raça	Haras Bage do Sul	2:30.20	
2001	Canzone ƒ	3	I. Correa	A. Rocha	Stud Capitão	Haras São José & Expedictus	2:26.14	
2000	Straight Flush	4	G. Assis	Dulcino Guignoni	Haras São José da Serra	Haras São José da Serra	2:27.90	

ƒ designates a filly or mare winner

== Earlier winners ==
- 1923: Mehemet Ali
- 1924: Eden
- 1925: Aprompto
- 1926: Printer
- 1927: Frayle Muerto
- 1928: Pons
- 1929: Santarem
- 1930: Flutter
- 1931: Bury
- 1932: Arco Iris
- 1933: Good Money ƒ
- 1934: Algarces
- 1935: Sargento
- 1936: Formasterus
- 1937: Timely
- 1938: Maritain
- 1939: Simpatico
- 1941: Teruel
- 1942: Tenor
- 1943: Latero
- 1944: Albatroz
- 1945: Fumo
- 1946: Miron
- 1947: Coraly ƒ
- 1948: Garbosa Bruleur ƒ
- 1949: Saravan
- 1950: Zonzo
- 1951: Jocosa ƒ
- 1952: Gualicho
- 1953: Gualicho
- 1954: Quiproquo
- 1955: Adil
- 1956: Adil
- 1957: Adil
- 1958: Dulce ƒ
- 1959: Atlas
- 1960: Farwell
- 1961: Arturo A.
- 1962: Arturo A.
- 1963: Sing Sing
- 1964: Snow Crown
- 1965: Maanim
- 1966: Trenzado
- 1967: Tagliamento
- 1968: Moustache
- 1969: Decorum
- 1970: Severus
- 1971: Viziane
- 1972: El Virtuoso
- 1973: Figuron
- 1974: Moraes Tinto
- 1975: Gadahar
- 1976: Big Poker
- 1977: Mogambo
- 1978: Donética ƒ
- 1979: Tibetano
- 1980: Dark Brown
- 1981: Rasputin
- 1982: Clackson
- 1983: Kenetico
- 1984: As de Pique
- 1985: Bretagne ƒ
- 1986: Cisplatine ƒ
- 1987: Grimaldi
- 1988: Ken Graf
- 1989: Troyanos
- 1990: Jex
- 1991: Thignon Lafre
- 1992: Urban Hero
- 1993: Vomage
- 1994: Much Better
- 1995: Val de Grace
- 1996: Rafaga Surena ƒ
- 1997: Quemay
- 1998: Quari Bravo
- 1999: Sweet Eternity ƒ

ƒ designates a filly or mare winner

The Grande Prêmio São Paulo was not run in 1940.
