= Gran Premio Carlos Pellegrini =

Gran Premio Internacional Carlos Pellegrini
- Class: Grade I
- Location: Hipódromo de San Isidro; Buenos Aires, Argentina
- Inaugurated: 1887
- Race type: Thoroughbred - Flat racing

Race information
- Distance: 2,400 meters (approx. 1 1/2 miles; 12 furlongs)
- Surface: Turf
- Track: Left-handed
- Qualification: 3-year-olds and up
- Weight: Assigned
- Purse: $500,000,000 ARS (2025); 1st: $250,000,000 ARS

The Gran Premio Carlos Pellegrini is the most prestigious horse race in Argentina. It is run in December at the Hipódromo de San Isidro, near Buenos Aires. The race was tied for the 93rd highest rated Group/Grade 1 Race for three-year-olds and upwards in the 2020 Longines World Rankings, with a rating of 115.75.

The Gran Premio Carlos Pellegrini is the fourth race in the Argentinian Quadruple Crown, and is part of the Breeders' Cup Challenge Series, with the winner gaining an automatic berth in the Breeders' Cup Turf.

== History ==
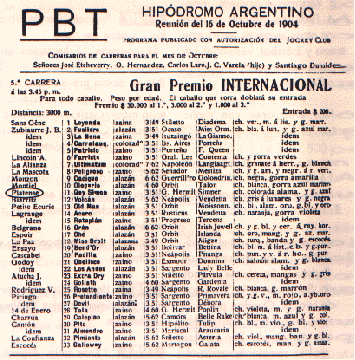
Program of the 1904 race, under the name of Gran Premio Internacional

The Gran Premio Carlos Pellegrini was first run in 1887, under the name of the Gran Premio Internacional. It was renamed the Gran Premio Carlos Pellegrini in 1941, with the name then changing between the two until 1979, when it was run as the Gran Premio República Argentina. Since 1980, the race has been run as the Gran Premio Carlos Pellegrini or Gran Premio Carlos Pellegrini Internacional. The location has also varied over time, being first run at the Hipódromo Nacional from 1887 to 1895, and then the Hipódromo Argentino from 1896 to 1940 and 1971 to 1978, and the Hipódromo de San Isidro from 1941 to 1970 and from 1979 to today.

The Gran Premio Carlos Pellegrini has been run over a variety of distances:

- 3000 meters: 1887–1978
- 2500 meters: 1979
- 2400 meters: 1980–present

In 1910, the Gran Premio Carlos Pellegrini had a notably large purse, being worth m$n10,000 to the, winner equivalent to US$50,000 at the time. By 1920, the purse had increased to m$n50,000, attracting 134 entries.

Former American president Theodore Roosevelt attended the 1913 Gran Premio Carlos Pellegrini, won by Enérgica.

There has twice been a dead heat: in 1915 between Dijital and Ocurrencia and in 1923 between Don Padilla and Movedizo.

In the 1952 edition, contested by Branding, Sideral, and Yatasto, was attended by 102,600 spectators, over the stated capacity of 100,000.

The only year the race was not run was in 1976, although the 1985 edition was run in February 1986 due to an equine influenza epidemic.

The 1999 edition of the Gran Premio Carlos Pellegrini was anticipated to be the race of the decade. The field included 11 Group 1 winners, including Litigado, Crystal House, Refinado Tom, Ixal, Coalsack, and eventual winner Asidero. The final time of 2:21.98 set an Argentine record for the distance.

Due to the COVID-19 pandemic, the 2020 edition was run without foreign horses and almost entirely without spectator attendance.

== Records ==
Speed Record:

- 2400 meters (current distance): 2:21.98 – Asidero (1999)
- 2500 meters: 2:35 2/5 – Habanico (1979)
- 3000 meters: 3:03.2 – Telescópico (1978)

Most wins:

- 2 – Athos II (1890, 1892)
- 2 – Pitillo (1897, 1899)
- 2 – Old Man (1904, 1905)
- 2 – Mouchette (1911, 1912)
- 2 – Macón (1925, 1926)
- 2 – Romántico (1938, 1939)
- 2 – Filón (1944, 1945)
- 2 – Académico (1946, 1948)
- 2 – Storm Mayor (2005, 2006)

Largest winning margin (since 1988):

- 9 lengths – Village King (2021)

Most wins by a jockey:

- 10 – Irineo Leguisamo (1924, 1930, 1932, 1934, 1944, 1945, 1948, 1954, 1961, 1962)
- 4 – Domingo Torterolo (1912, 1915, 1918, 1920)
- 4 – Máximo Acosta (1936, 1937, 1940, 1943)
- 4 – Pablo Gustavo Falero (1991, 1992, 2000, 2005)
- 4 – Edwin Rafael Talaverano Cardenas (1993, 1996, 1999, 2009)

Most wins by a trainer:

- 7 – Alfredo F. Gaitán Dassié (1988, 1995, 2009, 2020, 2014, 2016, 2020)
- 6 – Juan Lapistoy (1944, 1945, 1947, 1963, 1966, 1967)
- 5 – Sergio Lema (1962, 1968, 1969, 1971, 1972)
- 3 – Juan R. de la Cruz (1952, 1959, 1961)
- 3 – Carlos D. Etchechoury (2005, 2008, 2022)

Most wins by an owner:

- 4 – Haras El Turf (1923, 1968, 1969, 1971)
- 3 – J.B. Zubiaurre (1893, 1896, 1898)
- 3 – Indecís (1915, 1918, 1920)
- 3 – La Guardia (1911, 1912, 1929)

Most wins by a breeder:

- 3 – Haras Orilla del Monte (2001, 2004, 2008)
- 3 – Haras Abolengo (2011, 2020, 2024)

== Winners since 1988 ==
Year	Winner	Age	Jockey	Trainer	Owner	Breeder	Time	Margin	Ref
2025	(Brazil) Obataye	5	João Moreira	Antonio M. Oldoni	Haras Rio Iguassu	Haras Palmerini	2:24.14	1 1/2 lengths	
2024	(Argentina) Intense For Me	4	Martin Valle	Nicólas Martín Ferro	Toroquemero	Haras Abolengo	2:23.17	1/2 neck	
2023	(Argentina) El Encinal	3	Eduardo Ortega Pavón	Miguel Alberto Gomez	Doña Pancha	Haras El Paraiso	2:25.46	Head	
2022	(Argentina) The Punisher (Note: The 2022 winner The Punisher was later exported to Hong Kong and renamed Bravehearts)	3	Martin Valle	Carlos D. Etchechoury	Haras El Angel De Venecia	Haras El Angel De Venecia	2:24.47	3/4 length	
2021	(Argentina) Village King	7	Martin Valle	Juan Manuel Etchechoury	Haras El Angel De Venecia	Haras Santa Maria de Araras	2:23.42	9 lengths	
2020	(Argentina) Cool Day	3	Eduardo Ortega Pavón	Alfredo F. Gaitán Dassié	Francisco Pérez Werthein	Haras Abolengo	2:27.78	1/2 length	
2019	(Brazil) Nao da Mais	3	Carlos Lavor	Alfonso Barbosa	Haras Phillipson	Haras Phillipson	2:24.96	3/4 length	
2018	(Argentina) Il Mercato	3	Juan Carlos Noriega	Juan Sebastián Maldotti	Rubio B.	Haras La Pasion	2:28.52	Head	
2017	(Argentina) Puerto Escondido	4	Osvaldo Alderete	Pablo E. Sahagian	Santa Elena	Haras El Mallin	2:29.16	4 lengths	
2016	(Argentina) Sixties Song	3	Juan C. Villagra	Alfredo F. Gaitán Dassié	Julio Biancardi & partners	Haras Firmamento	2:26.88	1/2 neck	
2015	(Argentina) Hi Happy	3	Altair Domingos	P. Nickel Filho	Haras La Providencia	Haras La Providencia	2:24.37	1 1/2 lengths	
2014	(Argentina) Idolo Porteño	4	Jorge A. Ricardo	Alfredo F. Gaitán Dassié	Haras Cachagua	Haras La Esperanza	2:28.11	4 lengths	
2013	(Argentina) Soy Carambolo	6	Juan C. Noriega	Miguel Angel Suarez	Haras Polo	Haras Polo	2:24.67	1/2 neck	
2012	(Brazil) Going Somewhere	3	Nelito Cunha	Afonso F. Barbosa	Haras Phillipson	Haras Phillipson	2:22.20	1 1/2 lengths	
2011	(Argentina) Expressive Halo	4	Juan C. Noriega	Carlos A Meza Brunel	Caballeriza Axel	Haras Abolengo	2:24.84	1/2 head	
2010	(Brazil) Xin Xu Lin	3	Antonio C. Silva	Estanislau Petrochinski	José Renato Cruz e Tucci	Haras Pirassununga	2:31.20	2 lengths	
2009	(Argentina) Interaction	3	Edwin Talaverano	Alfredo F. Gaitán Dassié	Pozo de Luna, Inc.	Haras Futuro	2:23.19	3 lengths	
2008	(Argentina) Life of Victory	6	Rodrigo Blanco	Carlos D. Etchechoury	Caballeriza El Gusy	Haras Orilla del Monte	2:23.52	1/2 length	
2007	(Argentina) Latency	6	Julio C. Méndez	Juan B. Udaondo	Haras Las Dos Manos	Haras Las Dos Manos	2:23.14	3 lengths	
2006	(Argentina) Storm Mayor	4	Julio C. Méndez	Juan C. Bianchi	Caballeriza Starlight	Haras La Biznaga	2:23.80	3/4 length	
2005	(Argentina) Storm Mayor	3	Pablo Falero	Juan C. Bianchi	Caballeriza Starlight	Haras La Biznaga	2:23.41	Head	
2004	(Argentina) Fire Wall	3	Rodrigo G. Blanco	Carlos D. Etchechoury	Caballeriza El Gusy	Haras Orilla del Monte	2:23.35	1/2 neck	
2003	(Brazil) Gorylla	6	Jorge Ricardo	Miguel A. Alvani	Stud Colorado dos Pampas	Haras Morro Vermelho	2:23.80	2 lengths	
2002	(Argentina) Freddy	3	Pedro R. Robles	Martins J. Cariaga	Haras La Providencia	Antonio Gilberto Depieri	2:23.90	3 1/2 lengths	
2001	(Argentina) Second Reality	3	Gonzalo Hahn	Rodolfo A. Cariaga	El Asturiano	Haras Orilla del Monte	2:22.37	2 lengths	
2000	(Argentina) Guarachero	4	Pablo Falero	Juan C. Maldotti	Stud Corcel Negro	Haras Rodeo Chico	2:22.97	1 1/2 lengths	
1999	(Argentina) Asidero	3	Edwin Rafael Talaverano Cardenas	Juan C. Etchechoury Jr.	Haras de la Pomme	Haras de la Pomme	2:21.98	Head	
1998	(Argentina) Coalsack	3	Horacio Julian Betansos	Juan Carlos Bianchi	Erchu	Haras Comalal	2:22.41	1/2 length	
1997	(Argentina) Chullo	3	Oscar Fabián Conti	Eduardo Miguel Martínez de Hoz	San Pablo	Haras San Pablo	2:32.12	4 1/2 lengths	
1996	(United States) Fregy's	5	Edwin Rafael Talaverano Cardenas	Jorge Salas Vera	Myrna	James E. Combs	2:23.80	1 1/2 lengths	
1995	(Argentina) Seaborg	4	Juan José Paule	Alfredo F. Gaitán Dassié	Rio Claro (SI)	Haras El Alfalfar	2:22.15	1 length	
1994	(Brazil) Much Better	5	Jorge Antonio Ricardo	João Luis Maciel	Stud TNT	Haras J. B. Barros	2:24.2	2 lengths	
1993	(Peru) Laredo	4	Edwin Rafael Talaverano Cardenas	Jorge Salas Vera	Myrna	Haras Gina Santa Rosa	2:22.8	2 lengths	
1992	(Argentina) Potri Pe ƒ	3	Pablo Falero	Cosme H. Ahumada	Tori	Haras La Madrugada	2:24.0	4 lengths	
1991	(Argentina) Potrillon	3	Pablo Falero	Juan Carlos Maldotti	Tori	Haras La Madrugada	2:23.2	1 1/2 lengths	
1990	(Argentina) Algenib	3	Miguel Angel Sarati	Ernesto Eusebio Romero	Haras El Galo	Haras El Galo	2:22.2	3 lengths	
1989	(Argentina) Cacao	3	Jorge Sandro Caro Araya	Juan Carlos Etchechoury	Haras Guanabara	Haras Xara	2:24.8	1/2 head	
1988	(Argentina) Montubio	3	O. L. Zapata	Alfredo F. Gaitán Dassié	Tandil	Haras El Alfafar	2:24.0		

ƒ Designates a filly or mare

== Earlier winners ==
- 1887: Stiletto
- 1888: Gay Hermit
- 1889: Bolívar
- 1890: Athos II
- 1891: Camos
- 1892: Athos II
- 1893: Buenos Aires
- 1894: Revancha ƒ
- 1894: Massena
- 1895: Porteño
- 1896: Purrán
- 1897: Pilito
- 1898: Primero
- 1899: Pilito
- 1900: Etolo
- 1901: Druid
- 1902: Pippermint
- 1903: Pimiento
- 1904: Old Man
- 1905: Old Man
- 1906: Pelayo
- 1907: Olascoaga
- 1908: Bronce
- 1909: Cincel*
- 1910: Sibila ƒ
- 1911: Mouchette ƒ
- 1912: Mouchette ƒ
- 1913: Enérgica ƒ
- 1914: Irigoyen
- 1915: Dijital
- 1915: Ocurrencia
- 1916: Cabaret
- 1917: Botafogo
- 1918: Grey Fox
- 1919: Tiny
- 1920: Palospavos
- 1921: Moloch
- 1922: Rico
- 1923: Don Padilla
- 1923: Movedizo
- 1924: Lombardo
- 1925: Macón
- 1926: Macón
- 1927: Lyda ƒ
- 1928: Congreve
- 1929: Parlanchín
- 1930: Cocles
- 1931: Mineral
- 1932: Payaso
- 1933: Côte d'Or ƒ
- 1934: Cute Eyes
- 1935: Ix
- 1936: Camerino
- 1937: Albacea
- 1938: Romántico
- 1939: Romántico
- 1940: La Mission ƒ
- 1941: Bubalcó
- 1942: Tónico
- 1943: Banderín
- 1944: Filón
- 1945: Filón
- 1946: Académico
- 1947: Doubtless II
- 1948: Académico
- 1949: Cruz Montiel
- 1950: Singapur
- 1951: Yatasto
- 1952: Branding
- 1953: El Aragonés
- 1954: Jungle King
- 1955: Mangangá
- 1956: Tatán
- 1957: Fomento
- 1958: Manantial
- 1959: Escorial
- 1960: Atlas
- 1961: Arturo A.
- 1962: Tierno
- 1963: El Centauro
- 1964: Charolais
- 1965: Vit Reina ƒ
- 1966: Forli
- 1967: Rafale ƒ
- 1968: Indian Chief
- 1969: Practicante
- 1970: Snow Figure ƒ
- 1971: Uruguayo
- 1972: Chupito
- 1973: Santorín
- 1974: Gran Secreto
- 1975: Meyi
- 1976: Race not run
- 1977: El Muñeco
- 1978: Telescópico
- 1979: Habanico
- 1980: Regidor
- 1981: I'm Glad
- 1982: Sir Gold
- 1983: Immensity ƒ
- 1984: Reverente
- 1985: Salvate Tel
- 1986: Fain
- 1987: Larabee

ƒ Indicates a filly or mare

*Won by the disqualification of Baratieri
