= Sideral (horse) =

Argentine thoroughbred racehorse

- Sire: Seductor
- Grandsire: Full Sail
- Dam: Starling
- Damsire: Noble Star
- Sex: Stallion
- Foaled: 1948
- Died: 1974
- Country: Argentina
- Colour: Bay
- Breeder: Haras Chapadmalal
- Owner: Caballeriza Buarque de Macedo y Chapadmalal
- Record: 14: 9-4-1
- Earnings: m$n616,000

Major wins
- Clásico Comparación (1952) Clásico Estados Unidos del Brasil (1952) Clásico América (1952)

Awards
- Argentine Champion Older Male (1952/3)

Sideral (1948–1974) was an Argentine-bred thoroughbred racehorse and is a Classic Chef-de-race. He is considered to be one of the best sires from the Fairway sire line.

== Background ==
Sideral was a bay horse bred by Haras Chapadmalal and born in 1948.

Seductor, Sideral's sire, was a high-class racer, having been an Argentine Champion Three-Year-Old Colt and counting among his wins the Gran Premio Nacional, Gran Premio Jockey Club, Clásico Comparación, Clásico Miguel Cané, and Cláisco José B. Zubiaurre. At stud, although he never led the Argentine general sire list, Seductor was on it fourteen times.

Sideral's dam Starling was unraced. She was a half-sister to Yorkshire Oaks winner Angelola, dam of Aureole, Yorkshire Oaks and Cesarewitch Handicap winner Above Board, 1000 Guineas winner Hypericum, Great Yorkshire Stakes winner Kingstone, and Knight's Daughter, dam of Round Table. Sideral was her second foal after the 1946 Embrujo filly Star Glow. Starling would go on to produce Sagitaria, the undefeated winner of the Gran Premio Saturnino J. Unzué and the Clásico Eliseo Ramírez, and Siderea, Argentine Champion Three-Year-Old Filly and winner of the Gran Premio Selección and Gran Premio Criadores, both also by Seductor and thus full siblings to Sideral.

When Seductor was purchased from Caballeriza Buarque de Macedo by Haras Chapadmalal, an agreement was made that Buarque de Macedo would be able to pick among Seductor's yearling colts, and he chose Sideral due to his early promise.

Sideral was a nervous horse with high energy levels.

Sideral stood 16.2 hands tall. John Aiscan in the British Racehorse described Sideral as "impressive looking and very masculine. In his conformation we can detect some fine qualities inherited from his dam. He had strong hocks which he transmitted to his progeny. A prepotent sire, the majority of his progeny bore a close resemblance to him." He is also noted to have a great shoulder and hip and to have been well-balanced.

== Race career ==
Sideral won all three of his starts as a three-year-old.

As a four-year-old, Sideral won five of his seven starts. In 1952, he won Clásico Comparación, Clásico Estados Unidos de Brasil, and Clásico América, and ran second in the Clásico General Pueyrredón. He was also second to Branding in the Gran Premio Carlos Pellegrini. In 1953, he was second in the Gran Premio Miguel Alfredo Martínez de Hoz and ran second to Yatasto in the Gran Premio de Honor.

As a five-year-old, he won one of his four starts, as well as second twice and third once.

== Stud career ==
Sideral entered stud in 1954, standing alternatively at Haras Chapadmalal, Haras Comalal, and Haras Malal Hue during his career.

He led the Argentine general sire list three times, in 1963, 1966, and 1967, along with ranking second in 1959, 1960, and 1961, and third in 1965. He was also fourth in 1962 and tenth in 1968. Sideral was the leading broodmare sire in Argentina six times, in 1967, 1970, 1971, 1972, 1973, and 1975, along with finishing second in 1974 and third in 1968 and 1976.

In 1980, Sideral ranked on the Leading Sire's Sires list for worldwide sales, with fifteen broodmare sold for a gross of $494,100, one stallion sold for $7,500, and a total of 26 horses sold for a gross of $539,000.

Sideral was noted for stamping his progeny with both his physical appearance and his high-strung temperament.

Victorica Roca, leading Argentine breeder and owner of Haras Ojo de Agua, disliked Sideral as a sire, considering him to produce just winners rather than horses for the classics.

In the Roman-Miller dosage system, Sideral is considered a Classic Chef-de-race.

Sideral died in 1974 at Haras Comalal.

=== Notable progeny ===
- Pasion, Argentine Champion Three-Year-Old Filly, winner of the Gran Premio Selección, Gran Premio Polla de Potrancas, Gran Premio Ignacio Correas, etc.
- Sensitivo, winner of the Gran Premio Miguel Alfredo Martínez de Hoz, Clásico Chacabuco, Display Handicap, and Gallant Fox Handicap; notable sire in the United States
- El Centauro, Argentine Champion Three-Year-Old Colt, winner of the Gran Premio Carlos Pellegrini, Gran Premio de Honor, and Gran Premio General Belgrano; notable sire in Argentina
- Proposal, stakes placed racer and notable sire in Chile
- Pensilvania, Venezuelan Champion Older Mare, winner of the Gran Premio Selección, Gran Premio Jorge Atucha, Gran Premio Ignacio Correas, etc.
- Ribereno, Argentine Champion Three-Year-Old Colt, winner of the Gran Premio Nacional, Grande Prêmio Internacional Darda Rocha, etc.
- Sweet Sue, Argentine Champion Three-Year-Old Filly, winner of the Gran Premio Polla de Potrancas, Gran Premio Selección, Gran Premio Miguel Alfredo Martínez de Hoz, Gran Premio Ignacio Correas, etc.
- Bagdad, Uruguayan Champion Three-Year-Old Colt, winner of the Gran Premio Nacional; notable sire in Uruguay
- Lady Silver, Argentine Champion Three-Year-Old Filly, winner of the Gran Premio Polla de Potrancas
- Troubadour, winner of the Gran Premio Nacional; notable sire in Venezuela
- Kublai Khan, winner of the Gran Premio Benito Villanueva; notable sire in Brazil
- Melodie, winner of the Gran Premio Polla de Potrancas
- Hera, winner of the Gran Premio Selección
- Elogio, winner of the Gran Premio de Honor and Clásico Ayacucho
- Tebas, winner of the Gran Premio Selección
- Rigolo, notable sire in Argentina
- Wedlock, notable sire in Uruguay

=== Notable progeny of daughters ===
- Rafale, Argentine Horse of the Year and Champion Three-Year-Old Filly, winner of the Gran Premio Carlos Pellegrini, Gran Premio Selección, Gran Premio Polla de Potrancas, etc.
- Borobeta, winner of the Gran Premio Selección, Gran Premio 25 de Mayo, Gran Premio Criadores, etc.
- Hechizado, winner of the Brooklyn Handicap, Clark Handicap, etc.
- Tirania, winner of the Gran Premio Selección and Gran Premio Polla de Potrancas
- Predilección, winner of the Gran Premio Nacional and Gran Premio Eliseo Ramírez
- Dart, winner of the Grande Prêmio Dardo Rocha, Gran Premio Selección, etc.
- Olvida, winner of the Gran Premio Selección, etc.
- Chime, winner of the Gran Premio Saturino J. Unzué, Gran Premio Eliseo Ramírez, and Gran Premio Jorge Atucha
- Rigel, leading sire in Chile

== Pedigree ==
Pedigree of Sideral (ARG), bay stallion, foaled 1948
Sire Seductor (ARG) 1943	Full Sail (GB); 1934	Fairway (GB)	Phalaris (GB)
Sire Seductor (ARG) 1943	Full Sail (GB); 1934	Fairway (GB)	Scapa Flow (GB)
Sire Seductor (ARG) 1943	Full Sail (GB); 1934	Fancy Free (GB)	Stefan the Great (GB)
Sire Seductor (ARG) 1943	Full Sail (GB); 1934	Fancy Free (GB)	Celiba (IRE)
Sire Seductor (ARG) 1943	Suma (ARG); 1937	Macón (ARG)	Sandal (GB)
Sire Seductor (ARG) 1943	Suma (ARG); 1937	Macón (ARG)	Bourgogne (ARG)
Sire Seductor (ARG) 1943	Suma (ARG); 1937	Sweet Peggy (GB)	Pommern (GB)
Sire Seductor (ARG) 1943	Suma (ARG); 1937	Sweet Peggy (GB)	Gilt Brook (GB)
Dam Starling (GB) 1939	Noble Star (GB); 1927	Hapsburg (GB)	Desmond (GB)
Dam Starling (GB) 1939	Noble Star (GB); 1927	Hapsburg (GB)	Altesse (GB)
Dam Starling (GB) 1939	Noble Star (GB); 1927	Hesper (GB)	Herodote (GB)
Dam Starling (GB) 1939	Noble Star (GB); 1927	Hesper (GB)	Amourette (GB)
Dam Starling (GB) 1939	Feola (GB); 1933	Friar Marcus (GB)	Cicero (GB)
Dam Starling (GB) 1939	Feola (GB); 1933	Friar Marcus (GB)	Prim Nun (GB)
Dam Starling (GB) 1939	Feola (GB); 1933	Aloe (GB)	Son-in-Law (GB)
Dam Starling (GB) 1939	Feola (GB); 1933	Aloe (GB)	Alope (GB)
