= Seductor =

Argentine thoroughbred racehorse

- Sire: Full Sail
- Grandsire: Fairway
- Dam: Suma
- Damsire: Macón
- Sex: Stallion
- Foaled: 28 August 1943
- Died: Approximately 1966
- Country: Argentina
- Colour: Bay
- Breeder: Haras Argentino
- Owner: Caballeriza Buarque de Macedo (José Buarque de Macedo)
- Trainer: Juan Lapistoy
- Record: 9: 5-2-0
- Earnings: m$n201,400

Major wins
- Premio José B. Zubiaurre (1946); Premio Miguel Cané (1946); Gran Premio Jockey Club (1946); Gran Premio Nacional (1946); Premio Comparación (1946)

Awards
- Argentine Champion Broodmare Sire (1965)

Seductor (28 August 1943–1966?) was an Argentine thoroughbred racehorse and leading sire.

== Background ==
Seductor was bred by Haras Argentino.

Seductor was a light bay stallion with a heavy build. His hind legs were strongly built, especially his gaskins and quarters, and he had excellent shoulders.

== Racing career ==
Seductor was considered one of the leading racehorses of his generation in Argentina.

In the Gran Premio Jockey Club, Seductor was ridden by the famous jockey Irineo Leguisamo. In the stretch, he passed the front-running favorite and winner of the Polla de Potrillos, Remo, to win by three-quarters of a length in a final time of 2:03 4/5 for the 2000 meters. The win was the sixth Gran Premio Jockey Club win for Leguisamo and the second for Seductor's sire, Full Sail.

The Gran Premio Nacional attracted the largest crowd to Hipódromo Argentino de Palermo since the match race between Botafogo and Grey Fox in 1918. That day's card set a record for betting handle in South America of m$n7,603,876. Seductor was the favorite, with field also including Remo, who had lost for the first time in the Gran Premio Jockey Club, Pinturera, winner of the Gran Premio Selección, HORSES

Sedcutor took the early lead in the race and set a fast pace. 100 meters into the 2500-meter race, Caratón passed Seductor to take the lead and Remo came up to run next to Seductor in second. Around the first turn, Remo took the lead and Seductor fell back to fourth behind El Gurisito and Caratón. On the backstretch, El Gurisito took the lead, quickly opening up a 4 length lead. He maintained this lead into the final turn, at which point Seductor was running in joint-third with Recien behind Remo and Pinturera. In the stretch, Seductor made his move along with Caburé. 150 meters from the finish, Caburé took the lead from Remo with Seductor close behind. Seductor passed Caburé to win the race a neck in a final time of 2:36 2/5.

Following the Gran Premio Nacional, Seductor ran in the Gran Premio Carlos Pellegrini, finishing fourth behind Académico, who had beaten him previously in a non-stakes races, although Seductor was bumped in the race. Following the loss, Seductor won the Clásico Comparación, again defeating Caburé.

Along with Académico, Seductor was named one of the best three-year-olds in Argentina in 1946 and rated equal to him at 132 pounds for 2500 meters. Seductor was the leading horse in Argentina in 1946 by earnings.

Seductor was set to ship to Brazil to race in 1947, but didn't race again following the Clásico Comparación.

== Stud career ==
After his racing career, Seductor was acquired by Miguel and José Alfredo Martínez de Hoz. He stood at stud at Haras Chapadmalal, Haras Comalal, and Haras Malal Hué.

Seductor stamped his offspring with his own appearance, and his fillies generally did better than his colts. He is noted to have done well with mares by Rustom Pasha. As a broodmare sire, he nicked with Court Harwell.

The mare Starling II, by Noble Star, was bred to Seductor multiple times, producing the full siblings Sideral, Sidérea, and Sagitaria, all successful and notable racers.

According to the Jockey Club, Seductor sired 252 foals, including 32 (12.7%) stakes winners. He was the damsire of over 30 more stakes winners.

Seductor was third on the Argentine general sire list in 1962, and fourth in 1953 and 1957. Seductor led the Argentine broodmare sire list in 1965, was second in 1968, 1969, and 1970, and third in 1967 and 1971.

=== Notable progeny ===
- Sideral, Argentine Champion Older Horse, winner of the Clásico Comparación, etc. Champion sire.
- Carlinga, winner of the Gran Premio Selección, Gran Premio San Isidro, Clásico Ignacio Correas, etc.
- Sidérea, winner of the Gran Premio Selección, Clásico Criadores, Clásico Jorge Atucha, etc.
- Sagitaria, undefeated winner of the Gran Premio Saturnino J. Unzué and Clásico Eliseo Ramírez
- Élite, winner of the Gran Premio Polla de Potrancas, Clásico Enrique Acebal, Clásico Ignacio Correas, etc.
- Irmak, winner of the Gran Premio Nacional
- Panair, winner of the Gran Premio Polla de Potrancas
- Melodie, winner of the Gran Premio Polla de Potrancas, Clásico Jorge Atucha, Clásico Eliseo Ramírez, etc.
- Escudo Real, winner of the Clásico Coronel Miguel F. Martínez. Notable sire.
- Tagliamento, winner of the Grande Prêmio São Paulo, Gran Premio Dardo Rocha, etc.
- Paoluccio, winner of the Uruguayan Gran Premio Jockey Club, Long Island Handicap, Seneca Handicap (twice), Brighton Beach Handicap
- Venturanza, winner of the Clásico Eliseo Ramírez and Clásico Enrique Acebal
- Maxixa, winner of the Clásico Enrique Acebal
- Silver Moon, winner of the Clásico José B. Zubiaurre. Notable sire in Chile

=== Notable progeny of daughters ===
- La Sevillana, Argentine Champion Filly, winner of the Gran Premio Selección, Gran Premio Polla de Potrancas
- Napoles, winner of the Gran Premio Polla de Potrillos
- Pinabel, winner of the Gran Premio Carlos Pellegrini
- Tacha, winner of the Gran Premio Polla de Potrancas
- Chime, winner of the Gran Premio Saturnino J. Unzué
- Clasp, winner of the Gran Premio San Isidro
- Caresse, winner of the Gran Premio San Isidro
- Canadulzal, winner of the Gran Premio Polla de Potrillos
- Bacilación, winner of the Gran Premio Polla de Potrancas

== Pedigree ==
Pedigree of Seductor (ARG), bay stallion, foaled August 8, 1948
Sire Full Sail (GB) 1934	Fairway (GB); 1925	Phalaris (GB)	Polymelus (GB)
Sire Full Sail (GB) 1934	Fairway (GB); 1925	Phalaris (GB)	Bromus (GB)
Sire Full Sail (GB) 1934	Fairway (GB); 1925	Scapa Flow (GB)	Chaucer (GB)
Sire Full Sail (GB) 1934	Fairway (GB); 1925	Scapa Flow (GB)	Anchora (IRE)
Sire Full Sail (GB) 1934	Fancy Free (GB); 1924	Stefan the Great (GB)	The Tetrarch (IRE)
Sire Full Sail (GB) 1934	Fancy Free (GB); 1924	Stefan the Great (GB)	Perfect Peach (GB)
Sire Full Sail (GB) 1934	Fancy Free (GB); 1924	Celiba (IRE)	Bachelor's Double
Sire Full Sail (GB) 1934	Fancy Free (GB); 1924	Celiba (IRE)	Santa Maura (GB)
Dam Suma (ARG) 1937	Macón (ARG); 1922	Sandal (GB)	William the Third (GB)
Dam Suma (ARG) 1937	Macón (ARG); 1922	Sandal (GB)	Lindal (GB)
Dam Suma (ARG) 1937	Macón (ARG); 1922	Bourgogne (ARG)	Your Majesty (GB)
Dam Suma (ARG) 1937	Macón (ARG); 1922	Bourgogne (ARG)	Albilla (ARG)
Dam Suma (ARG) 1937	Sweet Peggy (GB); 1920	Pommern (GB)	Polymelus (GB)
Dam Suma (ARG) 1937	Sweet Peggy (GB); 1920	Pommern (GB)	Merry Agnes (GB)
Dam Suma (ARG) 1937	Sweet Peggy (GB); 1920	Gilt Brook (GB)	Long Tom (GB)
Dam Suma (ARG) 1937	Sweet Peggy (GB); 1920	Gilt Brook (GB)	Weir (GB)

Seductor is inbred 4S × 4D to Polymelus, meaning Polymelus appears in the fourth generation on both the sire and dam's side of the pedigree. Seductor is also inbred to St. Simon 5S x 5S × 5D and Persimmon 5S × 5D.
