= Full Sail (horse) =

British Thoroughbred racehorse

- Sire: Fairway
- Grandsire: Phalaris
- Dam: Fancy Free
- Damsire: Stefan the Great
- Sex: Stallion
- Foaled: March 14, 1934
- Died: 1953
- Country: Great Britain
- Colour: Bay
- Breeder: Harry Primrose, 6th Earl of Rosebery
- Owner: Harry Primrose, 6th Earl of Rosebery
- Record: 15: 3-2-1
- Earnings: ₤7,038

Major wins
- National Breeders' Produce Stakes (1936); March Stakes (1938)

Awards
- Leading Argentine General Sire 1946, 1948; Leading Argentine Broodmare Sire 1955, 1957, 1958

Full Sail (1934-1953) was a British Thoroughbred racehorse best known for being a leading sire in Argentina and major influence on South American breeding.

== Background ==
Full Sail was bred and owned throughout his racing career by the 6th Earl of Rosebery. He was foaled March 14, 1934.

Fairway, Full Sail's sire, was a successful racehorse, having won many important stakes races and been a champion every year he raced. He also proved to be a successful sire, eventually leading the British general sire list four times.

Fancy Free, Full Sail's dam, was a winner on the track, but was more notable for her breeding career. Two years after Full Sail, she foaled a full brother to him in Blue Peter, who would go on to be a leading three-year-old, winning four of four races that year, including the 2000 Guineas, Epsom Derby, and Eclipse Stakes.

Full Sail was considered to have good conformation. He was a bay horse with white pasterns on his hind legs.

== Racing career ==
Full Sail was a good two-year-old, winning the National Breeders' Produce Stakes. It was his only win, from five starts, of the year. He also finished second in a race and third in the July Stakes. In the Free Handicap of 1936, he was rated sixth.

At age three, he ran second in the St. James's Palace Stakes. He also managed one win in seven starts.

Full Sail ran three times at age four, winning the March Stakes and running second once.

== Stud career ==
Ricardo and Ezequiel Fernandez Guerrico purchased Full Sail at the culmination of his racing career in 1938. He was exported to Argentina to stand at their new Haras Argentino, and his first foals were born the following year. He was immediately successful, and founded a notable sire line in South America.

Full Sail led the Argentine General Sires List in 1946 and 1948 and was second in 1944, 1945, and 1947. He led the Argentine Broodmare Sires List in 1955, 1957, and 1958, second in 1959 and 1964, and third in 1954. In total, he was on the general sire list 14 times and sired the winners of 615 races.

He is noted to have nicked well with daughters of Macón.

Full Sail died in early 1953 and was buried on the lands of Haras Argentino.

In the Roman-Miller dosage system, Full Sail is considered an Intermediate Chef-de-Race.

=== Notable progeny ===
c = colt, f = filly, g = gelding

Foaled	Name	Sex	Major Wins
1939	Tronador	c	Gran Premio Jockey Club
1940	Filón	c	Gran Premio Carlos Pellegrini (twice), Gran Premio Jockey Club, Grande Prêmio Brasil, Gran Premio José Pedro Ramírez
1941	Quisquillosa	f	Polla de Potrancas
1943	Seductor	c	Gran Premio Nacional, Gran Premio Jockey Club, Clásico Comparación
1944	Bullanguera	f	Gran Premio Seleccion, Polla de Potrancas, Gran Premio Jorge de Atucha
1945	Empeñosa	f	Gran Premio Seleccion, Polla de Potrancas, Gran Premio Enrique Acebal, Grande Prêmio Major Suckow, Grande Prêmio ABCPCC
1949	Buscapie	c	Polla de Potrillos
1949	Mister Black	c	Gulfstream Park Handicap, Ben Ali Stakes
1950	Moctezuma	c	Gran Premio de Honor
1951	Montmartre	c	Gran Premio San Isidro, Gran Premio General San Martín, Clásico Comparación
1953	Holandes	c	Bay Meadows Handicap, San Fernando Stakes

=== Notable offspring of daughters ===
Foaled	Name	Sex	Major Wins
1950	Mangangá	c	Gran Premio Carlos Pellegrini, Gran Premio San Isidro (twice), Grande Prêmio Brasil, Gran Premio José Pedro Ramírez
1955	Manantial	c	Argentine Quadruple Crown, Gran Premio Nacional, Gran Premio Jockey Club, Polla de Potrillos, Gran Premio Carlos Pellegrini
1958	Emerson	c	Grande Prêmio Cruzeiro do Sul, Grande Prêmio Derby Paulista, Grande Prêmio Derby Sul-Americano
1960	Marchio	c	Gran Premio de Honor, Gran Premio 25 de Mayo

== Pedigree ==
Pedigree of Full Sail (GB), bay stallion, foaled 1934
Sire Fairway (GB) 1925	Phalaris (GB); 1913	Polymelus	Cyllene
Sire Fairway (GB) 1925	Phalaris (GB); 1913	Polymelus	Maid Marian
Sire Fairway (GB) 1925	Phalaris (GB); 1913	Bromus	Sainfoin
Sire Fairway (GB) 1925	Phalaris (GB); 1913	Bromus	Cheery
Sire Fairway (GB) 1925	Scapa Flow (GB); 1914	Chaucer	St. Simon
Sire Fairway (GB) 1925	Scapa Flow (GB); 1914	Chaucer	Canterbury Pilgrim
Sire Fairway (GB) 1925	Scapa Flow (GB); 1914	Anchora	Love Wisely
Sire Fairway (GB) 1925	Scapa Flow (GB); 1914	Anchora	Eryholme
Dam Fancy Free (GB) 1924	Stefan the Great (GB); 1916	The Tetrarch	Roi Herode
Dam Fancy Free (GB) 1924	Stefan the Great (GB); 1916	The Tetrarch	Vahren
Dam Fancy Free (GB) 1924	Stefan the Great (GB); 1916	Perfect Peach	Persimmon
Dam Fancy Free (GB) 1924	Stefan the Great (GB); 1916	Perfect Peach	Fascination
Dam Fancy Free (GB) 1924	Celiba (IRE); 1916	Bachelor's Double	Tredennis
Dam Fancy Free (GB) 1924	Celiba (IRE); 1916	Bachelor's Double	Lady Bawn
Dam Fancy Free (GB) 1924	Celiba (IRE); 1916	Santa Maura	St. Simon
Dam Fancy Free (GB) 1924	Celiba (IRE); 1916	Santa Maura	Palmflower

Full Sail is inbred 4S × 4D x 5S x 5D to St. Simon, meaning St. Simon appears in the fourth and fifth generations on both the sire and dam's side of the pedigree. Full Sail is also inbred to Bona Vista 5S × 5D.
