= Old Man (horse) =

Argentine thoroughbred racehorse

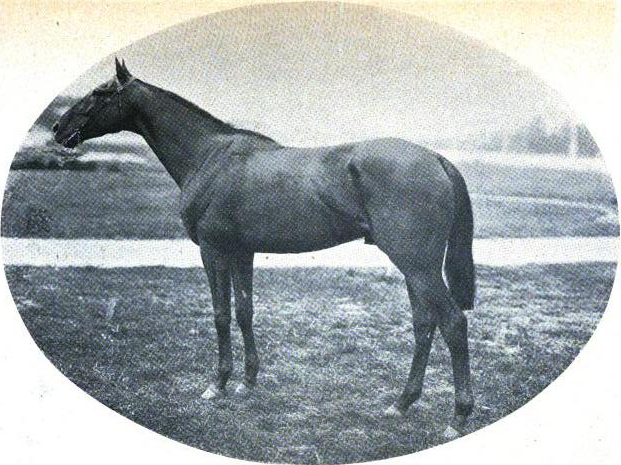
- Old Man
- Sire: Orbit
- Grandsire: Bend Or
- Dam: Moissonneuse
- Damsire: Dollar
- Sex: Stallion
- Foaled: 27 September 1901
- Died: 10 August 1918
- Country: Argentina
- Colour: Chestnut
- Breeder: Haras Viejo (Gilberto Lerena)
- Owner: Caballeriza Petite Ecurie (Adolfo and Rufino Luro)
- Trainer: Lauro de los Santos
- Record: 19: 18-1-0
- Earnings: m$n272,858

Major wins
- Premio Lavalle (1904); Premio La Madrid (1904); Premio Eliseo Ramírez (1904); Premio Iniciación (1904); Gran Premio Polla de Potrillos (1904); Gran Premio Jockey Club (1904); Gran Premio Nacional (1904); Gran Premio Internacional (1904, 1905); Premio Capital (1904); Premio Otoño (1905); Premio Hipódromo Argentino (1905); Premio Chacabuco (1905); Gran Premio de Honor (1905, 1906); Premio Invierno (1906); Premio Belgrano (1906)

Awards
- Argentine Quadruple Crown Winner (1904); Leading Sire in Argentina (1912, 1917, 1918); Leading Broodmare Sire in Argentina (1920, 1922–1929)

Old Man (27 September 1901–10 August 1918) was an Argentine thoroughbred racehorse who won the Argentine Quadruple Crown and became a preeminent sire. He is considered the first great racehorse bred in Argentina.

== Background ==
Old Man's sire Orbit was bred by the Duke of Westminster and won the Eclipse Stakes and Craven Stakes in Great Britain before being exported to Argentina in 1889, where he stood at stud and became an extremely successful sire. He led the Argentine general sire list twice and sired multiple notable racehorses.

Moissoneuse, Old Man's dam, was the winner of 15 races. She raced in France in 1887–1889 and won mostly at distances of 2500–3500 meters before being imported into Argentina in 1889 by Haras Nacional. She had produced three foals prior to Old Man, including Pegaso, a full brother to Old Man foaled in 1899, who would go on to sire four winners of the Derby Nacional in Peru.

Old Man was a large, solid chestnut horse. He was handsome, with strong haunches, an excellent shoulder, and a good topline. Old Man had a long and arched neck and handsome head. He had an elastic action when racing.

Old Man tended to race far back early before closing around the final turn. He tended to slow down at the very end of a race.

Old Man was bred by Haras Viejo, owned by Gilberto Lerena. His name was initially erroneously recorded as 'Bend Or', same as his grandsire, before being corrected. As a two-year-old, Old Man was sold to Caballeriza Petite Ecurie, owned by Adolfo and Rufino Luro, at a price of m$n8,000. Even before he started racing, he was considered to be a promising prospect. Old Man was trained by Lauro de los Santos, the private trainer for Caballeriza Petite Ecurie.

== Racing career ==
=== Two-year-old season ===
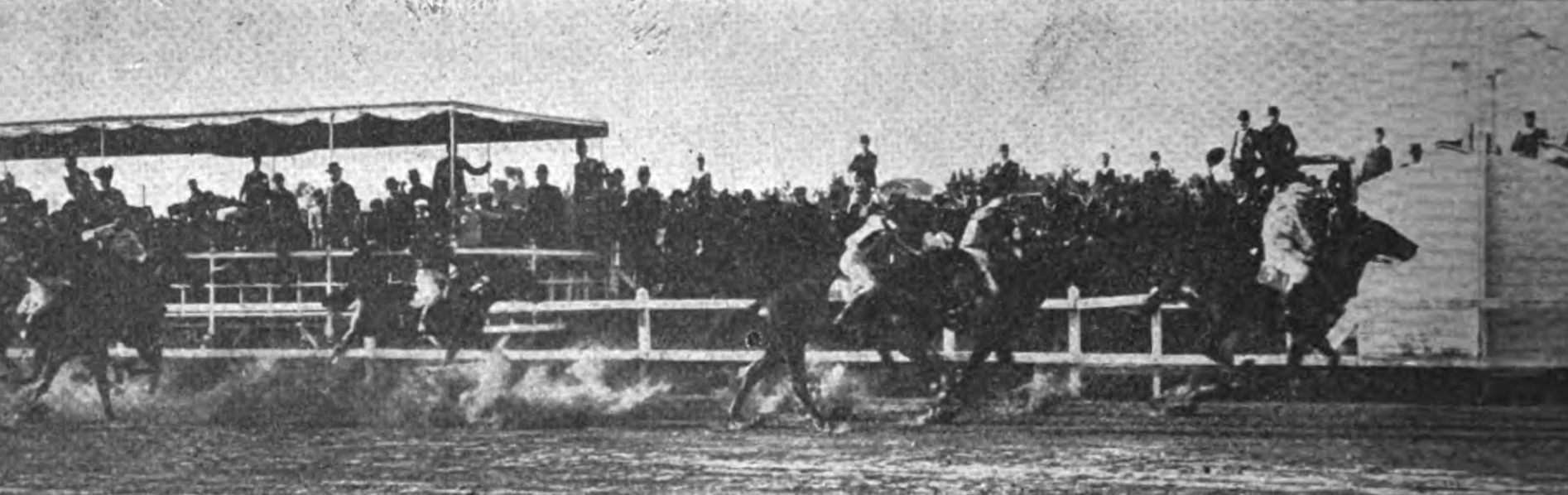
Old Man winning the Premio La Madrid

Old Man won on debut in a maiden race in a dominating performance. He followed this up with a 2 length win in the 1100-meter Premio General Lavalle, his first stakes race. The time for the race was 1:10 1/5.

Old Man's next start was in the stakes race Premio La Madrid, run over 1200 meters, starting as the overwhelming favorite, with more than 9,000 win tickets. Old Man ran in fourth early in the race, but moved forward down the backstretch. He reached the lead shortly before the final turn and entered the final stretch two lengths ahead. He won the race easily by a length in a final time of 1:13 2/5.

Old Man had a minor illness prior to his next start, in the Premio Eliseo Ramírez, run over 1400 meters. There was a change of jockey to V. Fernández immediately before the start of the race. Once again, he made up ground on the backstretch, and in the homestretch he caught the leaders and drew away to win by three lengths.

13,290 win tickets on Old Man were sold in advance of his next start, in the Premio Inciación, his last start as a two-year-old. He ran in third down the backstretch before taking the lead in the homestretch.

=== Quadruple Crown ===
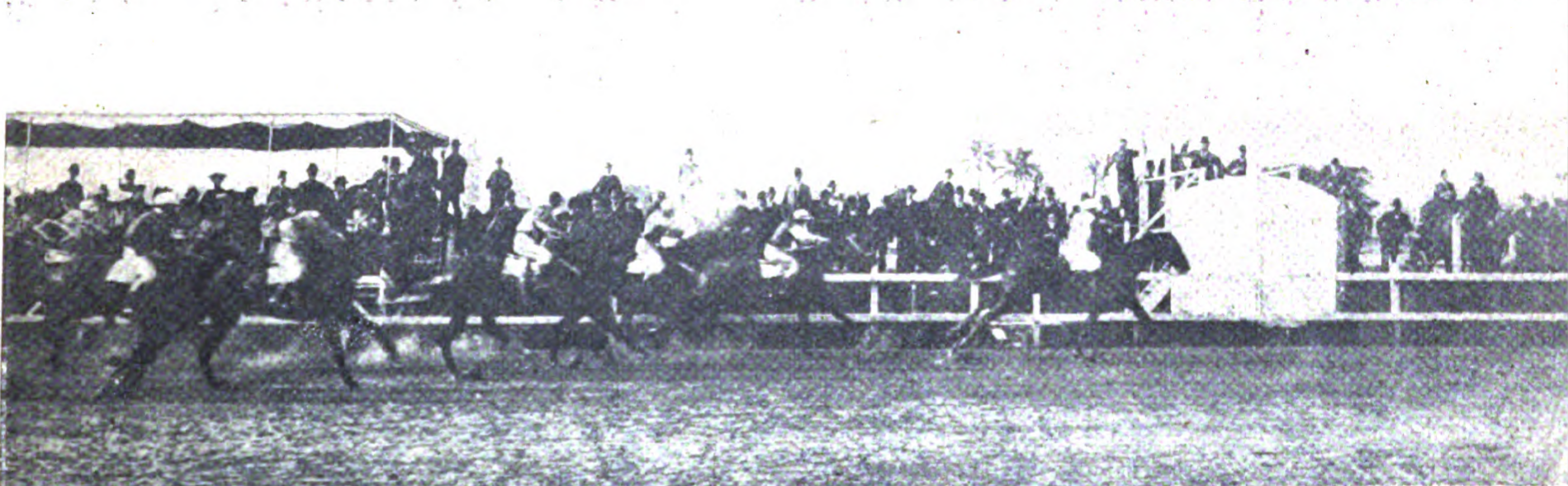
Old Man winning the Gran Premio Polla de Potrillos

In the Gran Premio Polla de Potrillos, first leg of the Argentine Triple Crown and Old Man's first start as a three-year-old, Old Man was held back for most of the race before being let loose in the final stretch. He easily dominated the race.

The second leg of the Triple Crown, the Gran Premio Jockey Club, attracted a higher class of competition than Old Man had faced previously. Nonetheless, he was again the dominant favorite, with 22,000 of the 33,000 win tickets sold being on him. At the start of the race, Dévil, a rabbit for the well-regarded colt Pretendiente, took the lead. Jockey Hernán Estévez kept Old Man near Dévil, not letting him gain too large of an advantage in the early race. Before the homestretch, Old Man took over the lead from Dévil, and easily won the race, tying the time set by Pippermint, at that point the only winner of the Argentine Quadruple Crown.

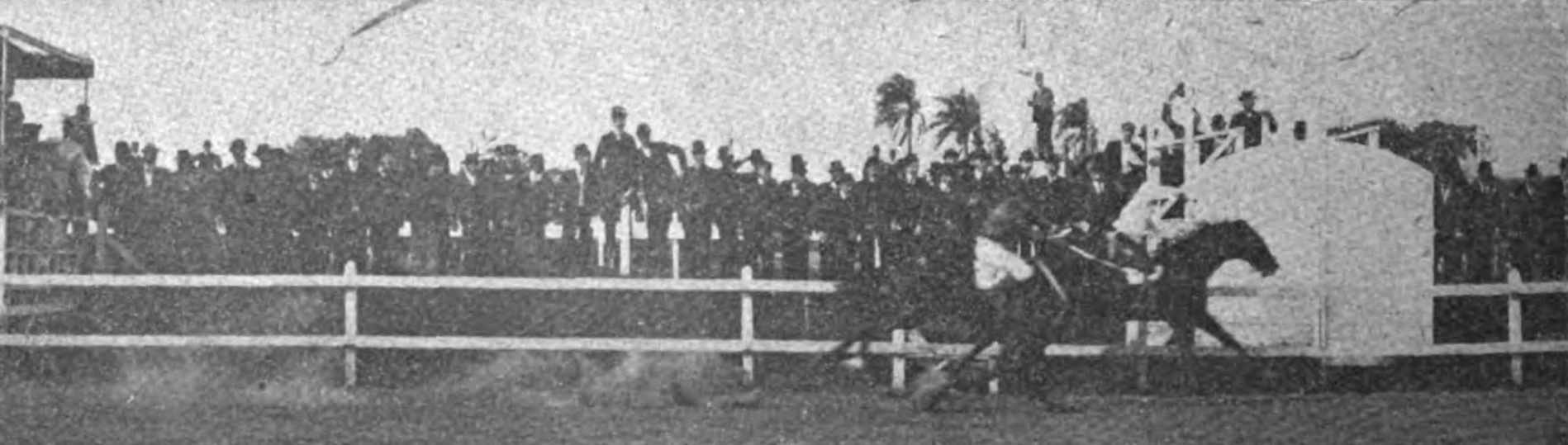
Old Man defeating Padilla in the Gran Premio Nacional

Old Man's next race was the Gran Premio Nacional, the final leg of the Argentine Triple Crown, run over a distance of 2500 meters. Only 5 of the 33 horses nominated to the race dared face Old Man, who attracted 24,083 of the 32,150 win tickets sold. After the start, Old Man settled into third, behind Celso and Acero and in front of Padilla and Pretendiente. 1600 meters into the race, Old Man began to advance. He took the lead moving into the homestretch. Soon after, Padilla made a move as well and challenged Old Man for the lead. The pair drew far ahead of the rest of the field and Padilla came up even with Old Man. Old Man pulled ahead near the end of the race to win by a half length. The final time was 2:37 1/2, a second and a half better than the old record of 2:39.

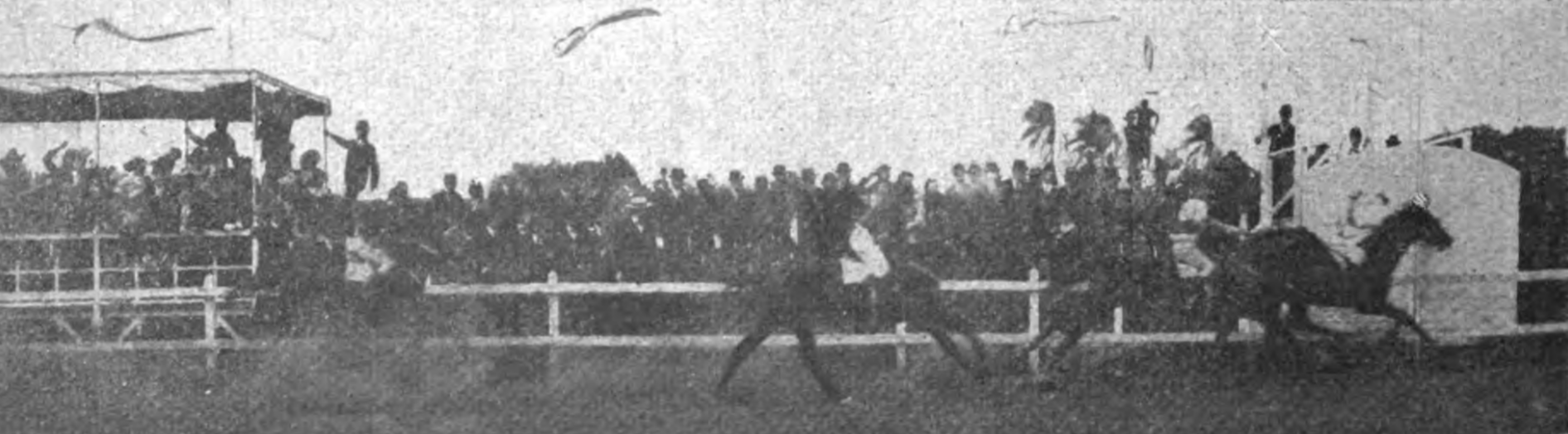
Old Man winning the Gran Premio Internacional

Old Man first faced older horses in the final leg of the Argentine Quadruple Crown, the 3000-meter Gran Premio Internacional (now known as the Gran Premio Carlos Pellegrini). The day was windy. Only four horses faced Old Man, including Padilla and the well-regarded older horse Calepino. Calepino took the immediate lead, with Old Man a couple lengths further back in second. The pace was slow for much of the race. Around the final turn, Estévez pushed Old Man forward, and he entered the straight a couple lengths ahead of Calepino. Calepino rallied and began to close on Old Man, but Old Man didn't tire and maintained a length advantage at the finish, although the time was slow.

=== Further career ===
Old Man faced defeat for the first time in his next race, the 2000-meter Premio Comparación. The track was heavy, such that the main track was impossible to use and the training track had to be used instead. Old Man ran in second early on, with Padilla just behind him in third. Moving into the homestretch, Old Man took the lead a couple lengths ahead of Padilla. Down the stretch Padilla closed in on Old Man, who failed to respond. Padilla won the race by a half length over Old Man, with a very poor time of 2:14 1/5. It would be Old Man's only loss.

Old Man's final start of 1904 was the Premio Clásico Capital, now known as the Gran Premio Miguel Alfredo Martínez de Hoz. His three competitors were all horses he had raced against prior: Padilla, Calepino, and Orán. Despite Old Man's prior loss, he was again the strong favorite. Unlike in his previous races, Old Man was placed at the front from the beginning. He ran easily and crossed the wire a good distance ahead of the competition, setting a new record of 2:37 for the distance, with a fractional time of 1:38 1/5 for 1600 meters.

Old Man ended 1904 with m$n154,858 in earnings.

In 1905, Old Man ran five times, winning the Premio Otoño, Premio Hipódromo Argentino, Premio Chacabuco, Gran Premio de Honor, and his second Gran Premio Internacional, with earnings of m$n80,000. He won the Premio Chacabuco in a walkover.

Old Man ran three times in 1906, winning the Premio Invierno in a walkover, the Premio Belgrano, and his second Gran Premio de Honor in his final start, earning m$n38,000. In that final Gran Premio de Honor, he won by 200 meters, or about one furlong.

== Stud career ==
Old Man was retired to stand stud at Haras El Moro, also owned by the Luro family.

Old Man's progeny debuted in 1910, and started off very well. That year, they won 20 races and m$n218,778, placing him fourth on the general sire list in Argentina. That first foal crop included Espirita and Enero.

Old Man's progeny won 685 races in Argentina between 1910 and 1924, including 130 stakes races. They earned m$n4,277,178. He led the Argentine general sire list three times, in 1912, 1917, and 1918, as well as being second in 1913, 1915, and 1916, fourth in 1910, 1914, 1919, and 1920, and fifth in 1911. Old Man was third on the Chilean general sire list in 1912/13. In 1913, Old Man was the leading the sire in the world, per the Bloodstock Breeders' Review, beating out other sires such as Simonian, Cyllene, Desmond, St. Frusquin, Chaucer, Rock Sand, William the Third, Gallinule, Spearmint, and Sundridge.

Old Man also excelled as a broodmare sire. Between 1920 and 1946, his daughters produced the winners of 1,385 races and m$n6,324,059. Old Man led the Argentine broodmare sire list nine times, 1920 and 1922–1929, as well as finishing second in 1921, 1934, and 1935, third in 1933, and fourth in 1932. Between 1920 and 1937, he was never lower than eighth on the list.

Old Man died at Haras El Moro on August 10, 1918.

=== Notable progeny ===
- Botafogo – Argentine Quadruple Crown winner, 1917/18 and 1918/19 Argentine Horse of the Year, 1917/18 Argentine Champion Three-Year-Old Male, 1918/19 Argentine Champion Older Male, winner of the Polla de Potrillos, Gran Premio Nacional, Gran Premio Jockey Club, Gran Premio Carlos Pellegrini, Gran Premio de Honor, etc.
- Espirita – 1909/10 Argentine Champion Two-Year-Old Filly, winner of the Gran Premio Nacional, Gran Premio Jockey Club, etc.
- San Jorge – Winner of the Gran Premio Nacional, Gran Premio Comparación, etc.; notable sire
- Esperito – Winner of the Gran Premio Jockey Club, Gran Premio Nacional, Clásico Capital, Clásico Ignacio Correas, etc.
- Asturiano – Winner of the Gran Premio Jockey Club and Clásico Comparación
- Salina – Winner of the Polla de Potrancas; notable broodmare
- Cartagena – Winner of the Polla de Potrancas
- Enero – Winner of the Clásico Hipódromo Argentino and Clásico Comparación; leading sire in Uruguay
- Canora – Winner of the Clásico Comparación
- La Ñatita – Winner of the Clásico Gilberto Lerena (twice), Clásico Ignacio Correas (twice), etc.
- Fantasio – Winner of the Clásico Eliseo Ramírez
- Oldiman – Winner of the Gran Premio José Pedro Ramírez
- Belkiss – Winner of the Gran Premio José Pedro Ramírez
- Espatula – Winner of the Clásico Suipacha
- La Glorieuse – Winner of the Clásico Criadores and Clásico Suipacha
- Carta Blanca – Winner of the Clásico Criadores
- Bigornia – Winner of the Clásico Criadores and Clásico Gilberto Lerena
- Cartagena – Winner of the Clásico Selección
- Chela – Winner of the Clásico Las Oaks and Cotejo de Potrancas
- Flying Star – Winner of the Clásico Selección (in a dead heat)
- Buñuelo – Leading sire in Chile

=== Notable progeny of daughters ===
- Rico – Argentine Quadruple Crown winner, winner of the Polla de Potrillos, Gran Premio Nacional, Gran Premio Jockey Club, Gran Premio Carlos Pellegrini, Clásico Comparación, Clásico Capital, Clásico Palermo, Clásico Santiago Luro, etc.
- Quemaita – Winner of the Gran Premio Nacional and Clásico Eliseo Ramírez
- Salmuera – Winner of the Polla de Potrancas, Clásico Selección, and Clásico Raúl Chevalier
- Dalmacia – Winner of the Polla de Potrancas and Clásico Ignacio Correas
- Democracia – Winner of the Clásico Selección and Clásico Ignacio Coreas
- Zarpazo – Winner of the Clásico Santiago Luro and Gran Premio José Pedro Ramírez
- Villanita –Winner of the Cláscio Selección and Clásico Enrique Acebal
- Piberia – Winner of the Gran Premio Jockey Club
- La Patria – Winner of the Gran Premio Jockey Club, Clásico Selección, and Clásico Santiago Luro
- Quemao – Winner of the Gran Premio Nacional and Clásico Dardo Rocha
- Brown – Winner of the Clásico General San Martín
- Obelisco – Winner of the Clásico Buenos Aires and Clásico Saturnino J. Unzué
- Mucha Pena – Winner of the Clásico Las Oaks and Clásico Polla de Potrancas; notable broodmare
- Garabata – Winner of the Clásico Santiago Luro
- Old Diamond – Winner of the Clásico Maipú and Premio Montevideo
- Bombero – Winner of the Clásico Saint Leger
- Cantimplora – Winner of the Clásico Las Oaks, Clásico Internacional (twice), Clásico Club Hípico de Santiago (twice)

== Legacy ==
Old Man was known as the "primer caballo argentino" (first Argentine horse) and "El Dios" (the God), with his daughters being known as "las hijas de Dios" (the Daughters of God).

Old Man is the namesake of the Clásico Old Man, which is a Group 3 race run over 1400 meters on the dirt as of 2024.

== Pedigree ==
Pedigree of Old Man (ARG), chestnut stallion, foaled 27 September 1901
Sire Orbit (IRE) 1885	Bend Or (GB); 1877	Doncaster (GB)	Stockwell (GB)
Sire Orbit (IRE) 1885	Bend Or (GB); 1877	Doncaster (GB)	Marigold (GB)
Sire Orbit (IRE) 1885	Bend Or (GB); 1877	Rouge Rose (GB)	Thormanby (GB)
Sire Orbit (IRE) 1885	Bend Or (GB); 1877	Rouge Rose (GB)	Ellen Horne (GB)
Sire Orbit (IRE) 1885	Fair Alice (GB); 1873	Cambuscan (GB)	Newminster (GB)
Sire Orbit (IRE) 1885	Fair Alice (GB); 1873	Cambuscan (GB)	The Arrow (GB)
Sire Orbit (IRE) 1885	Fair Alice (GB); 1873	Young Alice (GB)	Young Melbourne (GB)
Sire Orbit (IRE) 1885	Fair Alice (GB); 1873	Young Alice (GB)	Sweet Hawthorn (GB)
Dam Moissoneuse (FR) 1884	Dollar (FR); 1860	The Flying Dutchman (GB)	Bay Middleton (GB)
Dam Moissoneuse (FR) 1884	Dollar (FR); 1860	The Flying Dutchman (GB)	Barbelle (GB)
Dam Moissoneuse (FR) 1884	Dollar (FR); 1860	Payment (GB)	Slane (GB)
Dam Moissoneuse (FR) 1884	Dollar (FR); 1860	Payment (GB)	Receipt (GB)
Dam Moissoneuse (FR) 1884	Schooner (FR); 1862	Father Thames (GB)	Faugh-a-Ballagh (IRE)
Dam Moissoneuse (FR) 1884	Schooner (FR); 1862	Father Thames (GB)	Bran Mare (GB)
Dam Moissoneuse (FR) 1884	Schooner (FR); 1862	Admiralty (GB)	Collingwood (GB)
Dam Moissoneuse (FR) 1884	Schooner (FR); 1862	Admiralty (GB)	Blackbird (GB)

== See also ==
- List of leading Thoroughbred racehorses
