= Botafogo (horse) =

Argentinian racehorse

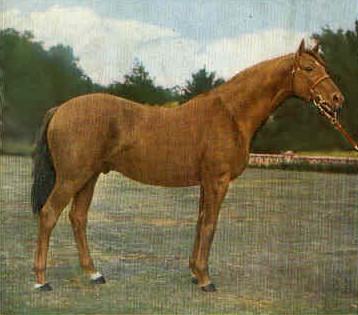
- Botafogo at stud
- Sire: Old Man
- Grandsire: Orbit
- Dam: Korea
- Damsire: Raeburn
- Sex: Stallion
- Foaled: 1914
- Country: Argentina
- Colour: Chestnut
- Breeder: Haras El Moro
- Owner: Caballeriza Diego de Alvear
- Trainer: Felipe Vizcay
- Record: 18: 17–1–0
- Earnings: m$n345,948

Major wins
- Premio Guillermo Kemmis (1917) Premio S. J. Boucau (1917); Premio Eliseo Ramírez (1917); Premio José B. Zubiaurre (1917); Gran Premio Polla de Potrillos (1917); Gran Premio Nacional (1917); Gran Premio Jockey Club (1917); Gran Premio Carlos Pellegrini (1917); Premio Comparación (1917); Premio Capital (1917); Premio América (1918); Premio Vicente L. Casares (1918); Premio Chacabuco (1918); Premio General Pueyrredón (1918); Premio Belgrano (1918) Gran Premio de Honor (1918)

Awards
- Argentinian Horse of the Year (1917/18, 1918/19) Argentinian Champion Three-Year-Old Male (1917/18) Argentinian Champion Older Male (1918/19)

Botafogo was an Argentinian Thoroughbred racehorse who won the Argentinian Quadruple Crown and was the Argentinian Horse of the Year. He is considered one of the greatest Argentinian racehorses and was known as the "Man o' War of South America" and the "People's Horse".

He is considered a national pride, and received widespread coverage in general and international media, including The New York Times.

== Background ==
Botafogo was a chestnut stallion with a white star and white hind pasterns, bred in Argentina at Haras El Moro by Adolfo and Rufino Luro. He was well-built.

Botafogo's dam, Korea, was imported into the United States as a foal in 1902 and was unsuccessful on the track. In 1910, she was exported to Argentina from Kentucky by Mrs. T. J. Carson, part of the trend of American breeders shipping their bloodstock to foreign countries after passage of the Hart–Agnew Law. Korea was sent to be covered by a well-known English stallion in Argentina, but the stallion refused to cover her, so she was instead sent to be covered by Old Man. Along with her filly by Ben Strome, Korea was sold at the Palermo sale to Stud El Moro for about $2,500, the highest price at the sale.

Old Man was a champion racehorse and winner of the Argentinian Quadruple Crown who had led the Argentinian general sire list in 1912 and would go on to do so again in 1917 and 1918.

Botafogo was born on November 7, 1914, and was purchased by Diego del Alvear for m$n25,000. Botafogo was originally named Kempis.

== Racing career ==
Botafogo ran in 1917 and 1918, winning seventeen of his eighteen starts. His only loss was in the 1918 Gran Premio Carlos Pellegrini to Grey Fox. Botafogo later beat Grey Fox in a match race.

=== 1917 ===
Botafogo's racing career began as a two-year-old in a 1000 meter race where he beat ten other horses in 1:00 3/5. He next ran in the 1000 meter Clásico Guillermo Kemmis on March 11, 1917. He won the race easily by one and a quarter lengths in a time of :59 3/5. Botafogo made a great impression with the win, but didn't race again until May 26, when he won the 1400 meter Clásico Salvador J. Boucou at Hipódromo Argentino de Palermo under jockey Jesús Baslías. He covered the 1400 meters in 1:24, winning wire to wire in a gallop by several lengths.

On June 10, Botafogo had his first of three walkovers in the Clásico Eliseo Ramírez. Having beaten some of the best regarded two-year-olds in his previous race, Botafogo was considered unbeatable and his presence resulted in no other horses being entered, despite numerous subscriptions. Botafogo ran the 1400 meters alone in 1:26 4/5. Botafogo again faced competition on July 1 in the Clásico José B. Zubiaurre in his first race as a three-year-old. Three other colts challenged Botafogo in the 1600 meter race run on a muddy track. Botafogo won by 30 meters in 1:39 4/5.

With five wins and earnings of m$n40,100, Botafogo was the leading racehorse in Argentina for the first half of 1917.

The first leg of the Argentinian Triple Crown, the Gran Premio Polla de Potrillos was run on August 12. Along with Botafogo, the field included Remanso, a well-regarded and undefeated colt, and the competition between the two undefeated colts brought a lot of interest to the race. The third horse in the race, Berthier, was also well regarded. Botafogo again won wire to wire, leaving Remanso and Berthier behind, running the 1600 meters in 1:37 2/5. The official win margin was four lengths, and the time was a new record.

Botafogo again faced Remanso in the second leg, the Gran Premio Jockey Club. The two were the only two in the race, and they ran neck and neck for the first 800 meters of the 2000 meter race. One commentator said "They looked like only one horse and only one rider, so together did they go and so harmonious were their movements." At that point, Remanso began to tire, and Botafogo drew away to win by several lengths in 2:05 1/5, with a fractional time for 1000 meters of :58 4/5.

In the Gran Premio Nacional, run on October 14 over 2500 meters as the third leg of the Triple Crown, five horses aside from Botafogo were entered, including Remanso, Berthier, and Takecare, who had beaten Remanso in his last race. Botafogo was the overwhelming favorite. Botafogo ran true to form, leading by three lengths for most of the race and covering the first 2000 meters in 2:05 4/5. In the stretch, Botafogo was restrained and won with all ease by three-quarters of a length over Takecare, covering the final 1000 meters in 1:01 for a final time of 2:39 3/5.

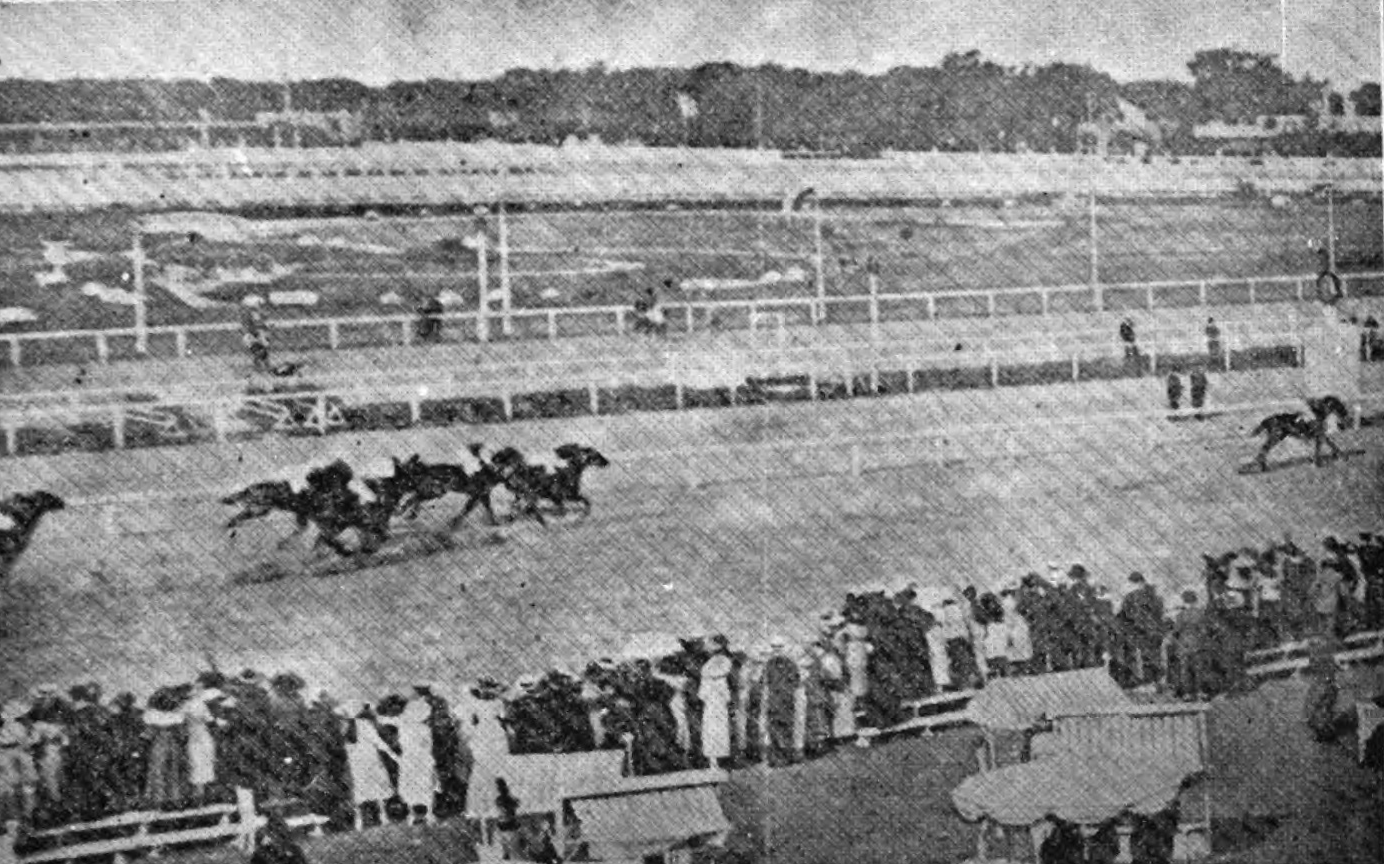
Botafogo winning the 1917 Gran Premio Carlos Pellegrini

Botafogo's next race, and the final leg of the Quadruple Crown, was the Gran Premio Carlos Pellegrini, the first time where he would face older horses. Leading up to the 3000 meter long race, there was enormous interest, with the stands at Palermo being unable to hold the record crowd of over 30,000. Of the 62,553 win tickets, 40,863 were bet on Botafogo. There were seven horses other than Botafogo entered, including Takecare and Berthier as well as Cabaret, the four-year-old winner of last year's Gran Premio Carlos Pellegrini, and Tresor, the six-year-old winner of the Copa de Oro. The start was good, with the entire field getting off well. A meters in Botafogo took the lead, with Cabaret two lengths behind. Around the first turn, Botafogo slowed and Cabaret challenged for the lead, coming up alongside him. Botafogo then accelerated to the cheers of the crowd, quickly pulling ahead by several lengths. The first 1000 meters were run in a leisurely 1:05, the first 1500 meters in 1:37, and the first 2000 meters in 2:08 2/5, which were slow times. At the entrance to the final turn, Cabaret had fallen far behind and the rest of the field attempted to challenge Botafogo, but were unable to catch him. When the field entered the final stretch, Botafogo led by four lengths, and Bastías, who had ridden Botafogo in all of his races, let him loose. Throughout the stretch, Botafogo easily drew away from the field to the cheers of the crowd, who made an "indescribable clamor" and threw their hats into the air. The final 2000 meters of the 3000 meter race were run in 2:03 4/5 and the final 1000 meters in 1:00 3/5. The final time was 3:08 4/5, lowering the record for the race that had previously been set by Mouchette. When the horses returned from the track, Diego de Alvear had to push through the crowd to reach his horse as the crowd cheered again and threw flowers.

Soon after the Gran Premio Carlos Pellegrini, a minor illness kept Botafogo off the track for a few days, which received widespread news coverage. Caras y Caretas published a cartoon showing Botafogo laying in a bed, wearing laurels and attended by several servants, with the caption reading that the whole country was thinking about Botafogo and Botafogo only.

By the 25th of November, Botafogo was feeling well enough to return to the races and ran in the Clásico Comparación, a 2200 meter race for three- and four-year-olds. St Emilión, who had been beaten by Botafogo in the Gran Premio Carlos Pellegrini, was the only other horse in the race. Botafogo won easily by two lengths in 2:15 1/5, setting a record for the distance on a track with a curve. The fractional time for 1000 meters was 1:00 2/5 and the fractional time for 2000 meters was 2:02 flat, which also set a new record.

Botafogo's last race of the year was the Clásico Capital, run on December 23, 1917. Again, St Emilión was the only horse there to face him in the 2500 meter race. From the start, St Emilión challenged Botafogo for the lead, but tired badly after 1000 meters. Botafogo won "in a trot" by "half a block" with a final time of 2:38 4/5.

Botafogo ended 1917 with 11 wins in 11 starts and earnings of m$n240,646, putting him at the top of the Argentinian charts.

=== 1918 ===
Botafogo's first race in 1918 was the Clásico America, a 1600 meter race for all ages, on April 28. The only other horse entered was the poorly-regarded four-year-old El Niño. The race was no contest, with Botafogo leading the entire way in an "easy exercise gallop" to win in 1:36, breaking his own previous record for the distance. Botafogo was slated to run in the Clásico Otoño, but was withdrawn. Botafogo raced again on May 26, in the Clásico Vicente L. Caseras. The race was a walkover as all other competitors declared forfeit once Botafogo's presence was announced. Botafogo ran the 2500 meters in 2:41.

Botafogo was withdrawn from the Clásico Libertado on June 29 due to the fact that he would have to carry extra weight because of his victory in the Clásico Vicente L. Caseras. Instead, Botafogo next ran in the weight-for-age Clásico Chacabuco on July 9, now officially a four-year-old. Once again, the announcement of his entry led to the withdrawal of all other competitors, leaving Botafogo alone to walk over, covering the 3000 meters in an easy 3:12. Botafogo faced only one other horse in the Clásico General Pueyrredon, which he won easily by several lengths, wire to wire. The time for the 4000 meters was 4:19.

On August 15, Botafogo again faced St Emilión, who had recently lowered the record time for a mile, in the Clásico Belgrano. Botafogo won in an easy gallop, leading the whole way to end several lengths ahead, running the 2500 meters in 2:37 1/5. From his five wins and m$n62,302 in earnings, Botafogo led the Argentinian charts for the first half of 1918. Two horses faced Botafogo in the Gran Premio de Honor on September 22, and Botafogo beat them in his usual style: by multiple lengths in an easy gallop, leading the entire way. The time for the 3500 meters was 3:45 3/5.

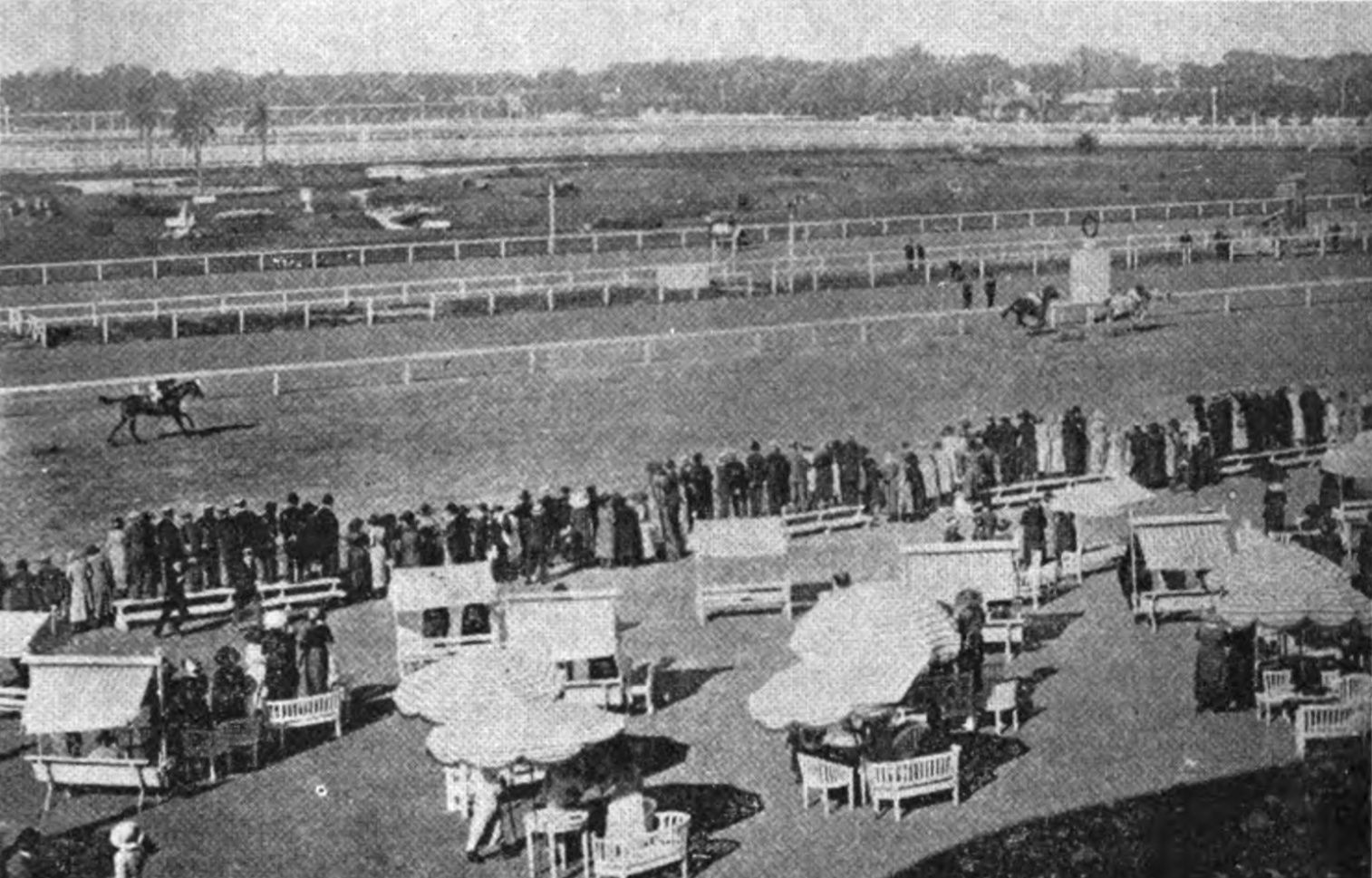
Botafogo losing to Grey Fox in the 1918 Gran Premio Carlos Pellegrini

On November 3, Botafogo ran in the Gran Premio Carlos Pellegrini. His victory was considered assured, with only three other horses. La Nación wrote that, for Botafogo, "there never was, nor ever will be, an adversary". Despite it being a festival day at Palermo, very little was bet, given the certainty of Botafogo's victory. Two of the other horses, St Emilión and Cracker, had already been defeated by Botafogo, and the third, Grey Fox, had never faced Botafogo before and had won several good handicaps, but was considered inferior. Botafogo took the lead at the start, as per the usual, with Grey Fox right behind him. The first 1000 meters were run in a very slow 1:07. As they entered the final stretch, Grey Fox came up alongside Botafogo and passed him to win by a length and a quarter in 3:10, covering the final 2000 meters in 2:03.

The crowd was shocked at Botafogo's loss, and immediately an uproar started. According to one witness, it was only comparable to an "unexpected revolution or a sudden declaration of war". The day after the race, La Prensa wrote that the news of Botafogo's defeat spread via telephone, being initially disbelieved, and became the talk of the town and headline news that same afternoon. Three main theories dominated the discussion as to Botafogo's loss: that Botafogo was in poor physical condition, that Botafogo's trainer, Felipe Vizcay, was incompetent, and that Botafogo's jockey, Jesús Bastías, had thrown the race on purpose. Shortly after, Diego de Alvear had four famous veterinarians examine Botafogo, who found the horse to be in excellent health and form, discrediting theories about Vizcay's incompetence or Botafogo's lack of fitness. Alvear fired Bastías, saying in La Razón that "there's something strange in all of this."

Saturnino J. Unzué, Grey Fox's owner, took offense at the insinuations, saying to the president of the Jockey Club that he was angered by "certain objections and suspicions related to the race". Alvear sent a letter to Unzué that was subsequently published in multiple newspapers, claiming that Botafogo's loss was due to "illicit management" and challenging Grey Fox to a match race, m$n10,000 a side, under identical conditions to the Gran Premio Carlos Pellegrini. Unzué accepted, and the race was set for November 17, two weeks after the Gran Premio Carlos Pellegrini.

=== The match race ===
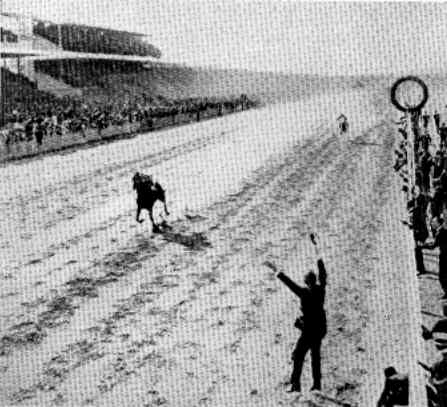
Botafogo defeating Grey Fox in their match race

The lead-up to the match race was enormous. The question of 'Botafogo or Grey Fox?' was the main theme of public discussion and was written about in many newspapers, both Argentinian and foreign. La Prensa called it "the most important race in the memory of horse racing in our country", La Capital said "'the entire world' is interested in this important match," El Turf called it "the most interesting and sensational of late", and La Razón said that it was "the only talk in sporting and social circles because of the position of their respective owners; even the most distinguished ladies of our society participate in the general enthusiasm". People came from all across Argentina, as well as Chile and Uruguay to watch the race.

Attendance was high. The grandstands at Palermo, with a capacity of 33,000, were quickly filled, and "the multitude formed an immense mass that started at the top of the grandstand and descended and ended piled up at the track's rail." One newspaper wrote that "the crowd was so compact that any movement was absolutely impossible". An estimated 50,000 people attended, although some estimates go as high as 100,000 people. Since the race was run outside the typical schedule for Palermo, no official betting was held, but nonetheless much betting was held with private gambling, with over 700,000 tickets sold. Grey Fox was again ridden by jockey Domingo Torterolo, who had guided him to victory in the Gran Premio Carlos Pellegrini, but Botafogo's jockey had changed to Francisco Arcuri.

In the first few strides of the race, Grey Fox was in front, but within a few meters, Botafogo took the lead. From that point on, Botafogo drew away from Grey Fox, eventually crossing the finish line fifty meters ahead with "astonishing ease", running the 3000 meters in 3:07, setting a world record for the distance.

The crowd's response was immense and instantaneous, flooding out onto the course and preventing Grey Fox from reaching the finish line. Police intervention was required for Botafogo to be able to exit the track. "Crazy with enthusiasm", the crowd invaded the grandstands and broke down barriers. According to one newspaper, the crowd's cheers didn't quiet down for four hours. The Buenos Aires Herald wrote that "To describe the delirium, the enthusiasm, the manifestation of insanity that dominated the largest crowd that had ever gathered in the Palermo racecourse is far outside the possibility of mere words." La Razón reported that many people cried and that Botafogo received kisses from many attendees. People pulled hairs from Botafogo's mane and tail as mementos, and the national flag was laid over him.

Botafogo retired with 17 wins in 18 starts and earnings of m$n345,948, a new earnings record for Argentina, although his 1918 earnings of m$n105,302 put him second on the Argentinian charts for the year.

== Retirement and stud career ==
After the match race, Botafogo was retired. Haras Ojo de Agua offered m$n600,000 payable over several years along with breeding rights for three mares. Haras Capadmalal offered m$n450,000 in cash. Martínez de Hoz, president of the Buenos Aires Jockey Club and owner of Haras Chapadmalal, eventually purchased Botafogo for £40,000, or about $200,000. Diego de Alvear reserved the right to send two or three mares to Botafogo for his first two seasons at stud and added the condition that Botafogo should not leave the country. Including these side bargains, the final price was about $255,000, which was to that point the highest price ever paid for a thoroughbred horse. He stood his entire career at stud at Haras Chapadmalal, and ranked third on the Argentinian general sire list in 1924 and 1925 and fourth on the Argentinian broodmare sire list in 1934.

Botafogo died of colic on April 21, 1922, at Mar del Plata Stables near Buenos Aires. His death was reported in the New York Times.

Botafogo's most notable offspring is Juventas, winner of the Gran Premio 25 de Mayo. Juventas would go on to be a very influential Argentinian foundation mare. He was also the damsire of Cute Eyes, winner of the 1934 Gran Premio Carlos Pellegrini, 1934 and 1935 Gran Premio Chacabuco, and 1934 and 1935 Gran Premio General Pueyrredón.

== Legacy ==
In 1918, the Clásico Botafogo, a 2200 meter handicap, was run in Botafogo's honor. As of 2022, the Gran Premio Botafogo is a Group 3 race for horses three years old and up in Argentina, run over 2000 meters on a turf track at Hipódromo de San Isidro.

Many years after Botafogo retired, "ran like a Botofogo" was praise reserved for exceptional performances. The term was used since at least 1918.

At least two tangos, "Botafogo for ever" and "Botafogo", were named after Botafogo.

== Pedigree ==
Pedigree of Botafogo (ARG), chestnut stallion, foaled November 7, 1914
Sire Old Man (ARG)	Orbit (IRE)	Bend Or (GB)	Doncaster
Sire Old Man (ARG)	Orbit (IRE)	Bend Or (GB)	Rouge Rose (GB)
Sire Old Man (ARG)	Orbit (IRE)	Fair Alice (GB)	Cambuscan (GB)
Sire Old Man (ARG)	Orbit (IRE)	Fair Alice (GB)	Young Alice (GB)
Sire Old Man (ARG)	Moissonneuse (FR)	Dollar (FR)	The Flying Dutchman (GB)
Sire Old Man (ARG)	Moissonneuse (FR)	Dollar (FR)	Payment (GB)
Sire Old Man (ARG)	Moissonneuse (FR)	Schooner (FR)	Father Thames (GB)
Sire Old Man (ARG)	Moissonneuse (FR)	Schooner (FR)	Admiralty (GB)
Dam Korea (GB)	Raeburn (GB)	St. Simon (GB)	Galopin (GB)
Dam Korea (GB)	Raeburn (GB)	St. Simon (GB)	St. Angela (GB)
Dam Korea (GB)	Raeburn (GB)	Mowerina (GB)	Scottish Chief (GB)
Dam Korea (GB)	Raeburn (GB)	Mowerina (GB)	Stockings (GB)
Dam Korea (GB)	Ulla (GB)	Barcaldine (IRE)	Solon (IRE)
Dam Korea (GB)	Ulla (GB)	Barcaldine (IRE)	Ballyroe (IRE)
Dam Korea (GB)	Ulla (GB)	Springwell (GB)	Coltness (GB)
Dam Korea (GB)	Ulla (GB)	Springwell (GB)	Wild Flower (GB)

Botafogo is not inbred in the first four generations.

== See also ==
- List of leading Thoroughbred racehorses
