= Macón (horse) =

Argentinian racehorse

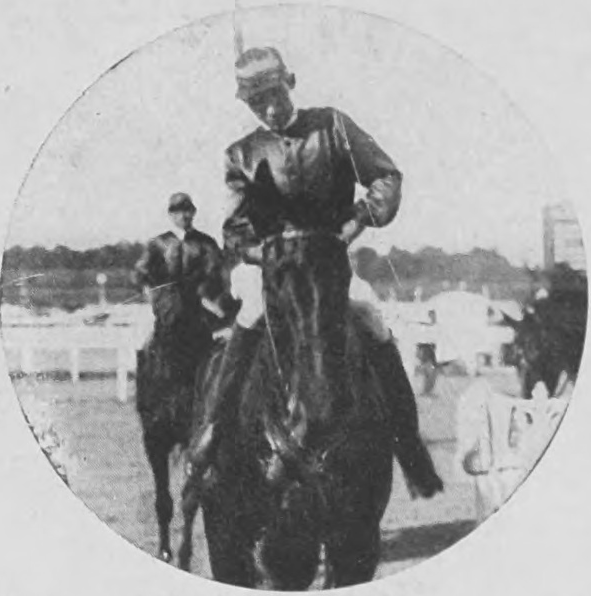
- Macón
- Sire: Sandal
- Grandsire: William the Third
- Dam: Bourgogne
- Damsire: Your Majesty
- Sex: Stallion
- Foaled: 1922
- Country: Argentina
- Colour: Bay
- Breeder: Haras Ojo de Agua
- Owner: Caballeriza Don Alfonso
- Trainer: Naciano Moreno
- Record: 15: 15–0–0
- Earnings: m$n446,635

Major wins
- Premio General Lavalle (1925) Premio Raúl Chevalier (1925); Gran Premio Polla de Potrillos (1925); Premio Rivadavia (1925); Gran Premio Nacional (1925); Gran Premio Carlos Pellegrini (1925, 1926); Premio Comparación (1925, 1926); Premio Benito Villanueva (1925); Gran Premio de Honor (1926); Premio Ayacucho (1926) Premio Capital (1926)

Awards
- Argentinian Champion Three-Year-Old Male (1925); Argentinian Champion Older Male (1926)

Macón was an undefeated Argentinian Thoroughbred racehorse.

== Background ==
Macón was bred by Haras Ojo de Agua and foaled in 1922. He was sold as a two-year-old in 1924 and was purchased at a high price by Jorge Mitre for his Stud Don Alfonso.

== Racing career ==
Macón was undefeated in 15 starts.

Macón debuted in February 1925, winning a 900-meter race.

In the 1925 Gran Premio Carlos Pellegrini, Macón set a record for the race of 3:06, which lasted for many years.

Macón finished 1925 with earnings of m$n263,855.50 and eight stakes wins.

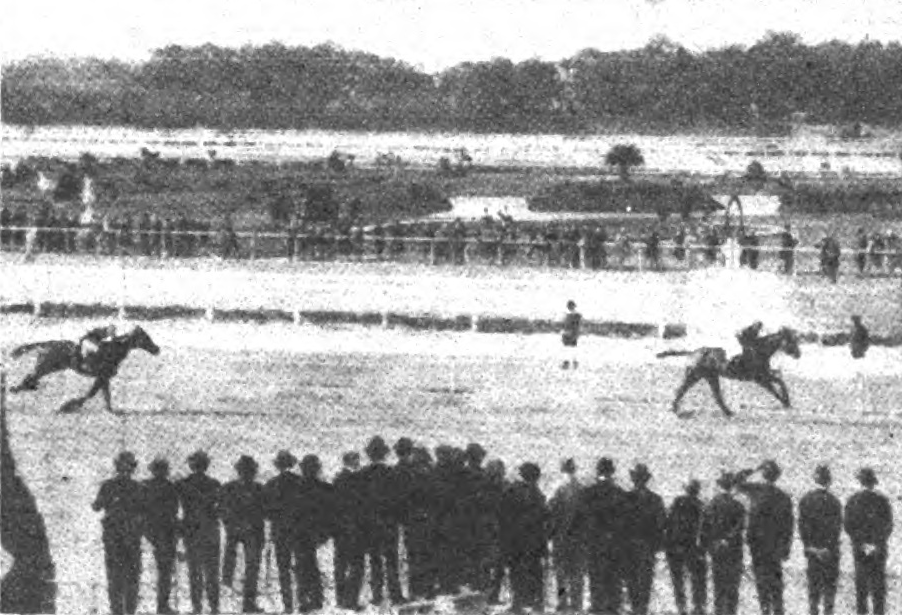
Macón winning the Gran Premio de Honor

He won the 1926 Gran Premio de Honor by multiple lengths in a time of 3:42.

Macón broke the earnings record in Argentina by winning the 1926 Gran Premio Carlos Pellegrini with earnings of 404,623 pesos.

Macón finished 1926 with earnings of m$n182,779.50 and six stakes wins.

== Stud record ==
Macón was acquired by Haras Argentino to stand at stud. He continued to stand at stud there for the rest of his stud career, and died there in 1945.

Macón peaked on the Argentine sire list in 1933 at fifth. In 1946, he was the leading broodmare sire in Argentina and ranked second in 1944. Macón was the damsire of Filón and Seductor.

== Pedigree ==
Pedigree of Macón (ARG), bay stallion, foaled 1922
Sire Sandal (GB)	William the Third (GB)	St Simon* (GB)	Galopin* (GB)
Sire Sandal (GB)	William the Third (GB)	St Simon* (GB)	St Angela (GB)
Sire Sandal (GB)	William the Third (GB)	Gravity (GB)	Wisdom (GB)
Sire Sandal (GB)	William the Third (GB)	Gravity (GB)	Enigma (GB)
Sire Sandal (GB)	Lindal (GB)	Kendal (GB)	Bend Or (GB)
Sire Sandal (GB)	Lindal (GB)	Kendal (GB)	Windermere (GB)
Sire Sandal (GB)	Lindal (GB)	Sunrise (GB)	Springfield (GB)
Sire Sandal (GB)	Lindal (GB)	Sunrise (GB)	Sunray (GB)
Dam Bourgogne (ARG)	Your Majesty (GB)	Persimmon (GB)	St Simon* (GB)
Dam Bourgogne (ARG)	Your Majesty (GB)	Persimmon (GB)	Perdita (GB)
Dam Bourgogne (ARG)	Your Majesty (GB)	Yours (ITY)	Melton (GB)
Dam Bourgogne (ARG)	Your Majesty (GB)	Yours (ITY)	Your Grace (GB)
Dam Bourgogne (ARG)	Albilla (ARG)	Gay Hermit (GB)	Hermit (GB)
Dam Bourgogne (ARG)	Albilla (ARG)	Gay Hermit (GB)	Doll Tearsheet (GB)
Dam Bourgogne (ARG)	Albilla (ARG)	Nesta (GB)	Galopin* (GB)
Dam Bourgogne (ARG)	Albilla (ARG)	Nesta (GB)	Crediton (GB)

* Macón is inbred 3S x 4D to the stallion St Simon, meaning that he appears third generation on the sire side of his pedigree and fourth generation on the dam side of his pedigree.

* Macón is inbred 4S x 5D x 4D to the stallion Galopin, meaning that he appears fourth generation on the sire side of his pedigree and fifth generation (via St Simon) and fourth generation on the dam side of his pedigree.

== See also ==
List of leading Thoroughbred racehorses
