= Gran Premio Miguel Alfredo Martínez de Hoz =

G1 horse race in Argentina

- Class: Group 1
- Inaugurated: 1889

Race information
- Distance: 2000 meters
- Surface: Turf
- Track: Hipódromo de San Isidro
- Qualification: Three-year-olds and up
- Purse: $100,000,000 ARS (2026); 1st: $50,000,000 ARS

The Gran Premio Miguel Alfredo Martínez de Hoz (previously Premio Capital, Premio Miguel Alfredo Martínez de Hoz, Premio Mejoramiento Equino) is a Group 1 horse race run at Hipódromo de San Isidro in Buenos Aires, Argentina, open to horses three years old or older. It is the first Group 1 race of the year in Argentina and is run over 2000 meters on the turf.

== History ==
The Gran Premio Miguel Alfredo Martínez de Hoz was inaugurated in 1889 as the Premio Capital. It ran under that name until 1935, when it was renamed to the Premio Miguel Alfredo Martínez de Hoz. In 1953, the race was run under the name of the Premio Mejoramiento Equino.

In 1942, Tonico won the Gran Premio Miguel Alfredo Martínez de Hoz in a walkover.

From 1969 to 1973, the Gran Premio Miguel Alfredo Martínez de Hoz was run at a distance of 2400 meters. In 1974, it was lengthened to 2500 meters, a distance it maintained until at least 1975.

The Gran Premio Miguel Alfredo Martínez de Hoz was run as a Group 2 race from 1973 to 2000 before being upgraded to Group 1 in 2001, a designation which it has maintained since.

In 2011, the Brazilian racehorse Send inthe Clowns became the first foreign horse to win the race.

Puerto Escondido became the first horse to win the Gran Premio Miguel Alfredo Martínez de Hoz twice since it became a Group 1 race in 2018. He remains the only horse to have done so, as of 2024. Previously, the race had been won twice by Athos II, in 1890 and 1892, Cute Eyes, in 1933 and 1934, Bon Vin, in 1939 and 1941, and Romance Moro, in 1988 and 1990.

== Records since 1989 ==
Speed record:

- 1:56.82 – Storm Military (2007)

Greatest winning margin:

- 9 lengths – Bogeyman (2012)

Most wins:

- 2 – Puerto Escondido (2017, 2018)

Most wins by a jockey:

- 4 – Jorge Valdivieso (1994, 1997, 2005, 2007)
- 3 – Juan Carlos Noriega (1999, 2009, 2014)
- 3 – Eduardo Ortega Pavón (2016, 2019, 2025)

Most wins by a trainer:

- 4 – Carlos D. Etchechoury (1995, 2005, 2010, 2013)

Most wins by an owner:

- 2 – La Titina (1989, 1996)
- 2 – Haras La Biznaga (2007, 2013)
- 2 – Haras El Angel de Venecia (2012, 2021)
- 2 – Facundito (2017, 2018)

Most wins by a breeder:

- 5 – Haras Firmamento (1993, 2000, 2001, 2004, 2008)
- 3 – Haras Vacacion (1995, 2003, 2014)

== Winners since 1989 ==
Year	Winner	Age	Jockey	Trainer	Owner	Breeder	Time	Margin	Group	Ref
2026	Thor Medina	3	Ivan E. Monasterolo	Eduardo Gaston Accosano	Stud El Marne	Haras El Paraiso	1:57.90	3/4 length	1	
2025	Grezzo	3	Eduardo Ortega Pavón	José Luiz Correa Aranha	Haras La Providencia	Haras La Providencia	2:01.62	3/4 length	1	
2024	Full Keid	3	Brian Rodrigo Enrique	Diego Peña	Stud Haras Gran Muñeca	Stud Haras Gran Muñeca	1:58.47	2 lengths	1	
2023	Miriñaque	6	Francisco Fernandes Gonçalves	Maria Cristina Muñoz	Parque Patricios	Haras de la Pomme	1:58.35	Neck	1	
2022	Dalbornell	5	Willim Pereyra	Jorge A. Mayansky Neer	Ferre	Haras El Paraiso	1:59.67	1/2 length	1	
2021	Village King	6	Brian Rodrigo Enrique	Juan Manuel Etchechoury	Haras El Angel de Venecia	Haras Santa Maria de Araras	2:01.14	Head	1	
2020	Imperador	3	Altair Domingos	Diego Peña	Stud RDI	Haras Rio Dois Irmaos	1:57.87	1 1/2 lengths	1	
2019	Nicholas	5	Eduardo Ortega Pavón	Enrique Martin Ferro	Stud Nosotros	Haras El Doguito	1:58.75	1 length	1	
2018	Puerto Escondido	4	A. Alderete Osvaldo	Pablo Ezequiel Sahagian	Facundito	Haras El Mallin	1:58.46	Head	1	
2017	Puerto Escondido	3	A. Alderete Osvaldo	Pablo Ezequiel Sahagian	Facundito	Haras El Mallin	2:01.16	1/2 neck	1	
2016	Catcho en Die	3	Eduardo Ortega Pavón	Ricardo Alberto Cardon	Don Quijote	Jorge Eduardo Livschitz	1:59.07	1 length	1	
2015	Alma de Acero	5	Francisco Fernandes Gonçalves	Agustin Pavlovsky	Baltasar	Haras La Cuadra	2:00.96	1/2 length	1	
2014	Fragotero	4	Juan Carlos Noriega	Miguel Angel Cafere	La Aguada	Haras Vacacion	2:04.14	3 lengths	1	
2013	Flowing Rye	5	Rodrigo G. Blanco	Carlos D. Etchechoury	Haras La Biznaga	Haras La Biznaga	1:57.81	1 1/2 lengths	1	
2012	Bogeyman	5	Jorge Antonio Ricardo	Juan Carlos Bianchi	Haras El Angel de Venecia	Haras Abolengo	1:58.09	9 lengths	1	
2011	Send inthe Clowns	4	Rodrigo Ivan Cunz	Alfredo F. Gaitan Dassie	Stud TNT	Stud TNT	1:58.20	1 1/2 lengths	1	
2010	City Banker	4	Adrian M. Giannetti	Carlos D. Etchechoury	El Gusy	Haras Santa Maria de Araras	2:04.18	1 length	1	
2009	Body Soguero	4	Juan Carlos Noriega	Federico Martucci	Fejiparema	Haras Chimpay	1:57.81	3/4 length	1	
2008	Honey Nov	4	Jorge Antonio Ricardo	Juan Carlos Etchechoury	Rubio B	Haras Firmamento	1:58.03	3/4 length	1	
2007	Storm Military	4	Jorge Valdivieso	Roberto Pellegatta	Haras La Biznaga	Haras La Biznaga	1:56.82	Neck	1	
2006	Latency	4	Julio Cesar Mendez	Juan Bautista Udaondo	Haras Las Dos Manos	Haras Las Dos Manos	1:57.81	1/2 length	1	
2005	Don Incauto	3	Jorge Valdivieso	Carlos D. Etchechoury	Haras San Benito	Haras San Benito	1:57.87	1/2 length	1	
2004	Guambia Bo	3	Daniel Davila Osvaldo	Facuno Bunge Frers	Stuf F.B.F.	Haras Firmamento	2:05.62	1 1/2 lengths	1	
2003	Rodeno	3	Pablo Gustavo Falero	Juan Carlos Maldotti	Nadina	Haras Vacacion	2:01.61	2 1/2 lengths	1	
2002	Insociable	3	Jacinto R. Herrera	Santillan G. Frankel	Doña Pancha		2:00.12	1/2 neck	1	
2001	Praxis Parade	3	Luiz Carlos Villalba	Horacio José A. Torres	Agus	Haras Firmamento	1:59.19	vm	1	
2000	Llers Fitz	4	Juan Pablo Lagos	Sabatino A. Scabone	Milenium	Haras Firmamento	1:58.53	1 1/2 lengths	2	
1999	Acicalado	3	Juan Carlos Noriega	Enrique Clerc	San Gilberto		1:58.18	1/2 length	2	
1998	Mario Eterno	3	Daniel Jorge Ojeda	José C. Cepeda	Mi Bebe		1:58.16	1/2 length	2	
1997	El Coliseo	6	Jorge Valdivieso	Ernesto Eusebio Romero	El Galo	Haras Comalal	1:57.35	Head	2	
1996	Fantasio	5	Carlos Alberto Zuco	Alberto J. Maldotti	La Titina		2:02.12	6 lengths	2	
1995	Double Paid	5	Juan Alberto Maciel	Carlos D. Etchechoury	Haras Vacacion	Haras Vacacion	1:58.60	3/4 length	2	
1994	Luck ƒ	6	Jorge Valdivieso	Eduardo M. Martínez de Hoz	Haras Comalal	Haras Comalal	1:59.00	2 1/2 lengths	2	
1993	Bullicioso In	3	Pablo Gustavo Falero	Vilmar Sanguinetti	Patria Grande	Haras Firmamento	1:59.20	1 1/2 lengths	2	
1992	Oceanside	4	Jacinto R. Herrera	Carlos Alberto Zarlengo	Haras La Quebrada	Haras La Quebrada	1:58.00		2	
1991	Tibaldi	3		Alberto J. Maldotti	La Esclava		2:00.40	1/2 head	2	
1990	Romance Moro	5		José Juri	Los Moros	José Juri	2:02.33	Neck	2	
1989	Companion	3	Edgardo Gramatica	Juan Alberto Maldotti	La Titina		2:01.60		2	

ƒ Designates a filly or mare

== Earlier winners (incomplete) ==
- 1889: Havre
- 1890: Athos II
- 1891: Camors
- 1892: Athos II
- 1893: Buenos Aires
- 1894: Lancero
- 1895: Revancha
- 1896: Atleta
- 1897: Alacrán
- 1898: Gonin
- 1899: Valero
- 1900: Penitente
- 1901: Tetuán
- 1902: Ultimatum
- 1903: Orán
- 1904: Old Man
- 1905: Pelayo
- 1906: Floreal
- 1907: Buchardo
- 1908: Melgarejo
- 1909: Ajó
- 1910: Espirita ƒ
- 1911: Larrea
- 1912: Bromo
- 1913: Enérgica ƒ
- 1914: Irigoyen
- 1915: Picacero
- 1916: Campanazo
- 1917: Botafogo
- 1918: Omega ƒ
- 1919: Remanso
- 1920: Buen Ojo
- 1921:
- 1922: Rico & Aldeano (DH)
- 1923: Mameluke
- 1924: Serlo
- 1925: Zarpazo II
- 1926: Macón
- 1927: Don Pizarro
- 1928: King Lomond
- 1929: Barranquero
- 1930: Segonzac
- 1931: Pilero
- 1932: Côte d'Or ƒ
- 1933: Cute Eyes
- 1934: Cute Eyes
- 1935: Catspaw
- 1936: Balbucó
- 1937: Camerino
- 1938: Filisteo
- 1939: Bon Vin
- 1940: Zorzalito
- 1941: Bon Vin
- 1942: Tónico
- 1943: Banderin
- 1944: Ben Omar
- 1945: Zorro
- 1946: Caburé
- 1947: Doubtless
- 1948: True Man
- 1949: Penny Post
- 1950: Singapur
- 1951: Solario
- 1952: El Aragonés
- 1953: Tanteo
- 1954:
- 1955:
- 1956: Chajacito
- 1957: Piazza
- 1958: Poderoso
- 1960: Sensitivo
- 1961: Pronto
- 1962: Don Birón
- 1963: Booz
- 1964: Berenjenal
- 1865: Sweet Sue ƒ
- 1966: Himera ƒ
- 1967: Decorum
- 1968: Adriatic
- 1969: Lunation ƒ
- 1970: Macho Real
- 1971: Luz Colorada ƒ
- 1972: Chupito
- 1973: Ligero
- 1974: Dearman
- 1975: Good Bloke
- 1979: Ahmad
- 1981: Pacific
- 1982: Usurpador
- 1987: Hall of Arts
- 1988: Romance Moro
