= Orbit (horse) =

British-bred Thoroughbred racehorse

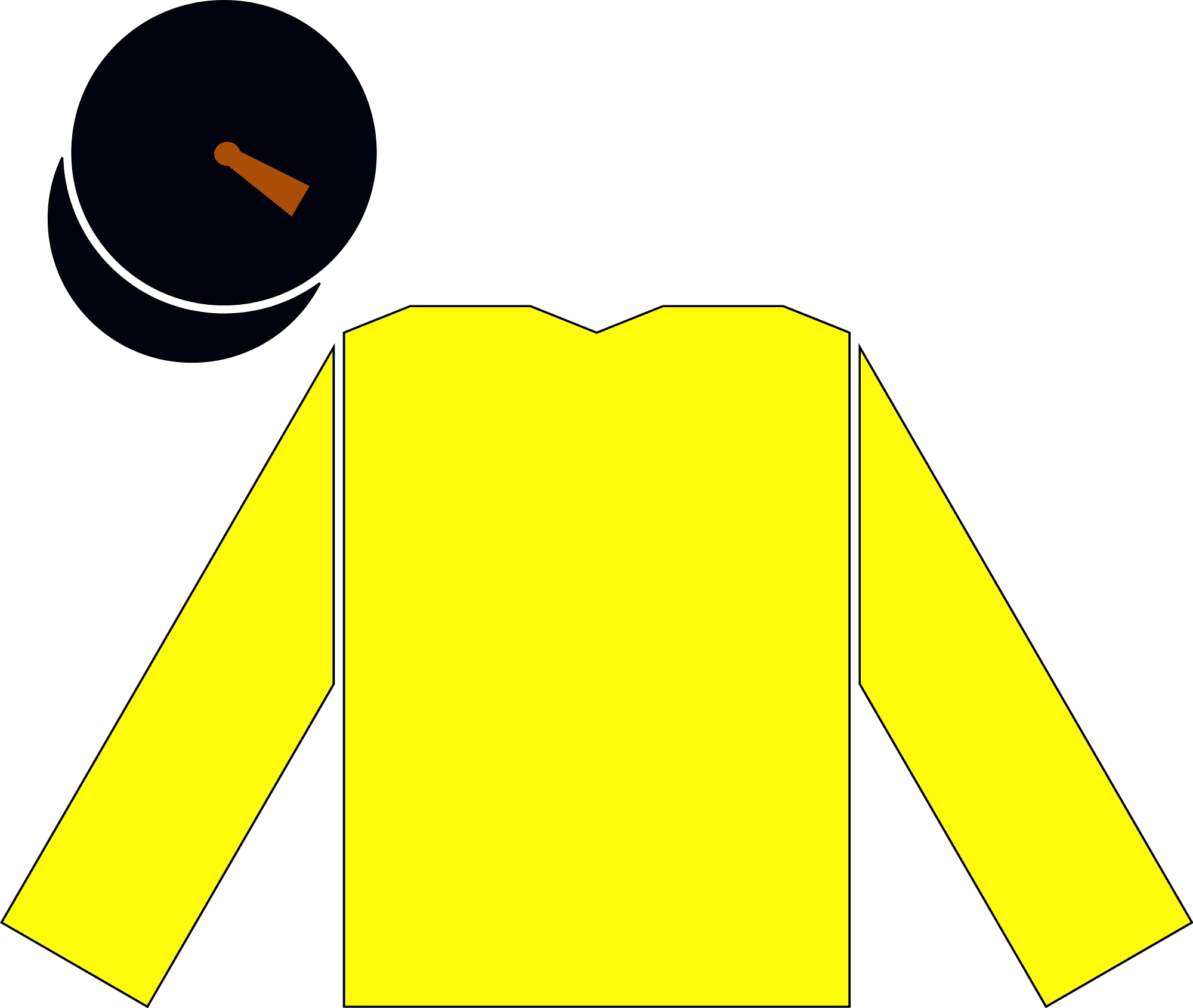
- Racing silks of the Duke of Westminster
- Sire: Bend Or
- Grandsire: Doncaster
- Dam: Fair Alice
- Damsire: Cambuscan
- Sex: Stallion
- Foaled: 1885
- Colour: Chestnut
- Owner: 1st Duke of Westminster
- Trainer: John Porter
- Record: 6 wins
- Earnings: £12,679

Major wins
- Craven Stakes (1888); Eclipse Stakes (1888)

Orbit (foaled 1885) was a Thoroughbred racehorse. He was trained at Kingsclere by John Porter for the 1st Duke of Westminster. As a three-year-old he won the Eclipse Stakes.

== Breeding ==
Orbit was the son of Epsom Derby and Champion Stakes winner Bend Or. His dam was Fair Alice, a daughter of July Stakes winner Cambuscan.

== Racing career ==
Orbit won three races as a two-year-old; the Criterion Nursery Handicap at Newmarket, the Kempton Park Champion Nursery Handicap and the Daveridge Stakes. Orbit started his three-year-old career by winning the Craven Stakes at Newmarket by ¾ length from Cotillon. His next race came in the 2000 Guineas at Newmarket. Friar's Balsam started as the 1/3 favourite for the race, with Ayrshire at 100/12 and Orbit at 100/8. Orbit ran on well in the closing stages to finish in third place. Ayrshire won the race by two lengths from Johnny Morgan, who was a head in front of Orbit. After winning the 2000 Guineas win Ayrshire started as the 5/6 favourite for The Derby and Orbit was second favourite at 11/2. Orbit could only finish in fifth place, over seven lengths behind winner Ayrshire. He then finished second in the Triennial Stakes at Ascot. Orbit started as the 9/4 favourite for the Eclipse Stakes and in the final 100 yards of the race Orbit gradually edged away from stablemate Ossory and beat him by a length.

== Stud career ==
After retiring from racing Orbit was exported to Argentina to stand at stud. He was a successful stallion there and his progeny included Olascoaga and Old Man, who won 18 of his 19 races. Such was his success at stud he was given the nickname "Stockwell Sudamericano" meaning "South American Stockwell" and referring to the British sire Stockwell.

== Pedigree ==
Pedigree of Orbit, chestnut stallion, 1885
Sire Bend Or ch. 1877	Doncaster ch. 1870	Stockwell ch. 1849	The Baron
Sire Bend Or ch. 1877	Doncaster ch. 1870	Stockwell ch. 1849	Pocahontas
Sire Bend Or ch. 1877	Doncaster ch. 1870	Marigold ch. 1860	Teddington
Sire Bend Or ch. 1877	Doncaster ch. 1870	Marigold ch. 1860	Ratan mare
Sire Bend Or ch. 1877	Rouge Rose ch. 1865	Thormanby ch. 1857	Windhound
Sire Bend Or ch. 1877	Rouge Rose ch. 1865	Thormanby ch. 1857	Alice Hawthorn*
Sire Bend Or ch. 1877	Rouge Rose ch. 1865	Ellen Horne br. 1844	Redshank
Sire Bend Or ch. 1877	Rouge Rose ch. 1865	Ellen Horne br. 1844	Delhi
Dam Fair Alice br. 1873	Cambuscan ch. 1861	Newminster b. 1848	Touchstone
Dam Fair Alice br. 1873	Cambuscan ch. 1861	Newminster b. 1848	Beeswing
Dam Fair Alice br. 1873	Cambuscan ch. 1861	The Arrow b. 1850	Slane
Dam Fair Alice br. 1873	Cambuscan ch. 1861	The Arrow b. 1850	Southdown
Dam Fair Alice br. 1873	Young Alice b. 1865	Young Melbourne br. 1855	Melbourne
Dam Fair Alice br. 1873	Young Alice b. 1865	Young Melbourne br. 1855	Clarissa
Dam Fair Alice br. 1873	Young Alice b. 1865	Sweet Hawthorn br. 1858	Sweetmeat
Dam Fair Alice br. 1873	Young Alice b. 1865	Sweet Hawthorn br. 1858	Alice Hawthorn*

Note: b. = Bay, br. = Brown, ch. = Chestnut

* Orbit was inbred 4x4 to Alice Hawthorn. This means that the mare appears twice in the fourth generation of his pedigree.
