= Gran Premio de Honor =

G1 horse race in Argentina

- Class: Group 1
- Inaugurated: 1887

Race information
- Distance: 2000 meters
- Surface: Dirt
- Track: Hipódromo Argentino de Palermo
- Qualification: Three-year-olds and up
- Weight: Weight for Age
- Purse: $21,000,000 ARS (2024); 1st: $10,000,000 ARS

The Gran Premio de Honor (also known as Copa de Oro Argentina, Gran Premio de Honor Eduardo Casey) is a Group 1 horse race run at Hipódromo Argentino de Palermo in Buenos Aires, Argentina, open to horses three years old or older. It is currently run over a distance of 2000 metres (1.2 mi) on the dirt.

== History ==
The Gran Premio de Honor was first run in 1887 over a distance of 3500 meters.

The Gran Premio de Honor has been run at a variety of distances, including:

- 3500 meters (1899–1977?)
- 3000 meters (1988?–1992)
- 2500 meters (1993–2006)
- 2000 meters (2007–present)

From 1960 to 1963, the Gran Premio de Honor was run as the Gran Premio de Honor Eduardo Casey.

From 1988 to 2006, the race was restricted to horses four years old or older and run in October. When it was moved to April in 2007, it was opened to horses three years old or older.

The Gran Premio de Honor is the second jewel in the Campeonato Palermo de Oro ® Para todo caballo de 3 años y más edad, run after the Group 2 Premio Clásico Otoño and before the Group 1 Gran Premio República Argentina.

== Records since 1988 ==
Speed record:

- 2000 meters (current distance): 1:58.95 – Mystery Train (2014)
- 2500 meters: 2:28.46 – Potridoon (1994)
- 3000 meters: 3:08.35 – Formaggio (1992)
- 3500 meters: 3:37 4/5 – Banderín (1943)

Greatest winning margin:

- 11 lengths – Gold Fire (2002)

Most wins:

Since 1988, no horse has won the Gran Premio de Honor more than once. Prior to that, Mouchette won three times (1911, 1912, 1913) and the race was won twice by Old Man (1905, 1906), Caid (1921, 1922), Balbucó (1936, 1937), Bon Vin (1940, 1941), Churrinche (1945, 1946), Penny Post (1949, 1950), Yatasto (1952, 1953), and Imbroglio (1959, 1960).

Most wins by a jockey:

- 4 – Jacinto R. Herrera (1992, 1997, 1998, 1999)
- 4 – Pablo Gustavo Falero (1994, 2003, 2009, 2011)
- 4 – Juan Carlos Noriega (1995, 2001, 2008 2025)

Most wins by a trainer:

- 3 – Roberto Pellegatta (2001, 2005, 2007)
- 3 – Juan Carlos Maldotti (1994, 1995, 2003)

Most wins by an owner:

- 3 – Stud Tori (1994, 1995, 1999)
- 3 – Stud Mate y Venga (2014, 2015, 2017)

Most wins by a breeder:

- 4 – Haras El Turf (1993, 2000, 2018, 2022)
- 4 – Haras Firmamento (2002, 2004, 2005, 2024)
- 3 – Haras La Madrugada (1994, 1995, 1999)

== Winners since 1988 ==
Year	Winner	Age	Jockey	Trainer	Owner	Breeder	Distance	Time	Margin	Ref
2026	Butterfing	3	Kevin Banegas	Juan Franco Saldivia	Stud El Papi	Haras San Lorenzo de Areco	2000 meters	2:02.79	1/2 length	
2025	Crazy Talent	4	Juan Carlos Noriega	Miguel Ángel Suarez	Stud Aladino	Haras La Caballeriza	2000 meters	2:00.52	1 1/2 lengths	
2024	Jazz Seiver	4	Adrián M. Giannetti	Juan Manuel Etchechoury	Haras Las Monjitas	Haras Firmamento	2000 meters	1:59.37	1 length	
2023	Miriñaque	6	F. Fernandes Gonçalves	María Cristina Muñoz	Stud Parque Patricios	Haras de la Pomme	2000 meters	1:59.44	7 lengths	
2022	Dreaman	5	Cristian E. Velázquez	Rubén Omar Soto	Stud Vientos del 80	Haras El Turf	2000 meters	2:00.30	1 length	
2021	Strategos	5	F. Fernandes Gonçalves	Nicólas Martín Ferro	Haras Ojos Claros	Haras La Pasion & Haras Ojos Claros	2000 meters	2:01.45	2 lengths	
2020	Race not run									
2019	Wild Stream	3	Ivan E. Monasterolo	José Antonio Lofiego	Stud El Granate	Ivan R. & Marcos I. Ayerza	2000 meters	2:02.80	3 lengths	
2018	Balompie	3	José A. Da Silva	Gregorio Bernardo Vivas	Stud S. de B.	Haras El Turf	2000 meters	2:02.90	2 lengths	
2017	Fiskardo	3	Octavio F. Arias	Luis Oscar Molina	Stud Mate y Venga	Roberto José Mac Laughlin	2000 meters	2:00.85	4 lengths	
2016	El Margot	4	Altair Domingos	Enrique Martín Ferro	Stud Don Luis	Luis Maria Succession Aramburu	2000 meters	2:02.65	1/2 length	
2015	Forever Sale	3	Octavio F. Arias	Luis Oscar Molina	Stud Mate y Venga	Haras Arroyo de Luna	2000 meters	2:03.58	1/2 length	
2014	Mystery Train	3	Mario Luis Leyes	Marcelo Ambrosio Arce	Stud Mate y Venga	Haras Arroyo de Luna	2000 meters	1:58.95	Head	
2013	Arte Pop	3	Jorge G. Ruíz Díaz	Isidoro L. San Millán	Haras La Quebrada	Haras La Quebrada	2000 meters	2:02.26	4 lengths	
2012	Rabid in the Rye	3	Cardenas E. Talaverano	G. Frenkel Santillán	Stud Las Canarias	Haras La Biznaga	2000 meters	2:02.48	1/2 head	
2011	Immaculate	4	Pablo Gustavo Falero	Juan Carlos Viviani	Stud S.J.		2000 meters	2:00.61	2 lengths	
2010	Lingote de Oro	4	José Ricardo Méndez	Ernesto Eusebio Romero	Haras El Angel de Venecia	Haras La Providencia	2000 meters	2:02.43	5 lengths	
2009	Latency	7	Pablo Gustavo Falero	Juan Bautista Udaondo	Stud El Bobo	Haras Las Dos Manos	2000 meters	2:01.39	3/4 length	
2008	Body Soguero	3	Juan Carlos Noriega	Federico Martucci	Stud Fejiparema		2000 meters	2:00.34	1 1/2 lengths	
2007	El Charleta	3	Osvaldo A. Alderete	Roberto Pellegatta	Stud Juanito's	Haras Las Camelias	2000 meters	2:00.67	4 lengths	
2006	Storm Mayor	4	Julio César Méndez	Roberto A. Desvard	Stud Starlight	Haras La Biznaga	2500 meters	2:36.81	8 lengths	
2005	Matador Marshal	5	Gustavo E. Calvente	Roberto Pellegatta	Stud Asuncion	Haras Firmamento	2500 meters	2:37.03	7 lengths	
2004	Tino Wells	4	Edgardo Gramática	Miguel Ángel García	Stud S. de B.	Haras Firmamento	2500 meters	2:38.52	Neck	
2003	Grand Vitesse	5	Pablo Gustavo Falero	Juan Carlos Maldotti	Stud E.V.G.		2500 meters	2:40.00	Head	
2002	Gold Fire	7	Pedro Roberto Robles	Juan Carlos Etchechoury	Stud Eme Ele	Haras Firmamento	2500 meters	2:34.95	11 lengths	
2001	Tuozzo	5	Juan Carlos Noriega	Roberto Pellegatta	Mariano A.	Haras La Gringa	2500 meters	2:39.23	3 lengths	
2000	Mash	4	Juan Carlos Jarcovsky	Juan Carlos Bianchi	Stud Los Carlos	Haras El Turf	2500 meters	2:36.26	DQ	
1999	Warllon ƒ	4	Jacinto R. Herrera	Diego Peña	Stud Tori	Haras La Madrugada	2500 meters	2:38.95	Neck	
1998	Snappy John	5	Jacinto R. Herrera	Diego Peña	Stud Chopy		2500 meters	2:37.80	2 1/2 lengths	
1997	Merlin Sil	4	Jacinto R. Herrera	Roberto A. Pellegatta	Haras Caryjuan	Haras Caryjuan	2500 meters	2:32.64	9 lengths	
1996	Bonaventura ƒ	4	Oscar Fabián Conti	Humberto J. Benesperi	Stud Meli	Haras La Quebrada	2500 meters	2:32.53	4 lengths	
1995	Potrialma ƒ	4	Juan Carlos Noriega	Juan Carlos Maldotti	Stud Tori	Haras La Madrugada	2500 meters	2:34.18	Neck	
1994	Potridoon	4	Pablo Gustavo Falero	Juan Carlos Maldotti	Stud Tori	Haras La Madrugada	2500 meters	2:28.46	10 lengths	
1993	Bambou	5		Juan Carlos Etchechoury	Haras El Turf	Haras El Turf	2500 meters	2:34.59	7 lengths	
1992	Formaggio	7	Jactino R. Herrera	José Luis Palacios	Stud Gualeyo	Haras San Ambrosio	3000 meters	3:08.35	5 lengths	
1991	The King	4	Walter Hugo Serrudo	G. Frenkel Santillán	Stud Rodeo Chico		3000 meters	3:12.30	7 lengths	
1990	Bab Dancer	4	Oscar Fabián Conti		Stud Kika		3000 meters	3:18.44		
1989	Savage Toss	4	Jorge Validvieso		Haras La Biznaga		3000 meters	3:13.29		
1988	Santangelo	4	Hector R. Zurita		Stud S.L.S.		3000 meters	3:10.86		

ƒ Indicates a filly or mare

== Earlier winners (incomplete) ==
- 1887: Last Prince
- 1888: Cormeilles
- 1889: Indecis
- 1890: Avril
- 1891: Camors
- 1892: San Martín
- 1893: Ituzaingó
- 1894: Revancha*
- 1895: Landseer
- 1896: Cartouche II
- 1897: Porteño
- 1898: Pillito
- 1899: Yerba Amarga ƒ
- 1900: Orizón
- 1901: Ovacion
- 1902: Diaz
- 1903: Day
- 1904: Calepino
- 1905: Old Man
- 1906: Old Man
- 1907: Buchardo
- 1908: Index
- 1909: Sibila ƒ
- 1910: César Borgia
- 1911: Mouchette ƒ
- 1912: Mouchette ƒ
- 1913: Mouchette ƒ
- 1914: Irigoyen
- 1915: Smasher
- 1916: Dijital
- 1917: Trésor
- 1918: Botafogo
- 1919: José Eduardo
- 1920: Moloch
- 1921: Caid
- 1922: Caid
- 1923: Don Padilla
- 1924: Stayer
- 1925: Serio
- 1926: Macón
- 1927: Rubens
- 1928: Copetín
- 1929: Negrero
- 1930: Cocles
- 1931: Signum
- 1932: Picapleitos
- 1933: Cuapito
- 1934: Codihué
- 1935: Cute Eyes
- 1936: Balbucó
- 1937: Balbucó
- 1938: Filisteo
- 1939: Halifax
- 1940: Bon Vin
- 1941: Bon Vin
- 1942: Tónico
- 1943: Banderin
- 1944: Blackie ƒ & Plateria ƒ (DH)
- 1945: Churrinche
- 1946: Churrinche
- 1947: Académico
- 1948: Malquerido
- 1949: Penny Post
- 1950: Penny Post
- 1951: Optimo
- 1952: Yatasto
- 1953: Yatasto
- 1954: Moctezuma
- 1955: Alamo
- 1956: Tatán
- 1957: Don Varela
- 1958: Anisado
- 1959: Imbroglio
- 1960: Imbroglio
- 1961: Arturo A.
- 1962: Eutropio
- 1963: El Centauro
- 1964: Booz
- 1965: Charolais
- 1966: Saskatoon
- 1967: Elogio
- 1968: Decorum
- 1969: Indian Chief
- 1970: Up
- 1971: Juan Bueno
- 1972: Fizz ƒ
- 1973: Sidero
- 1974: Gallion
- 1975: El Andaluz
- 1976: Poitiers
- 1977: Serxens
- 1979: Farmer
- 1982: Propicio
- 1983: Mat-Boy
- 1986: Fain
- 1987: Larabee

*Not a pure thoroughbred
