= William the Third (horse) =

British-bred Thoroughbred racehorse

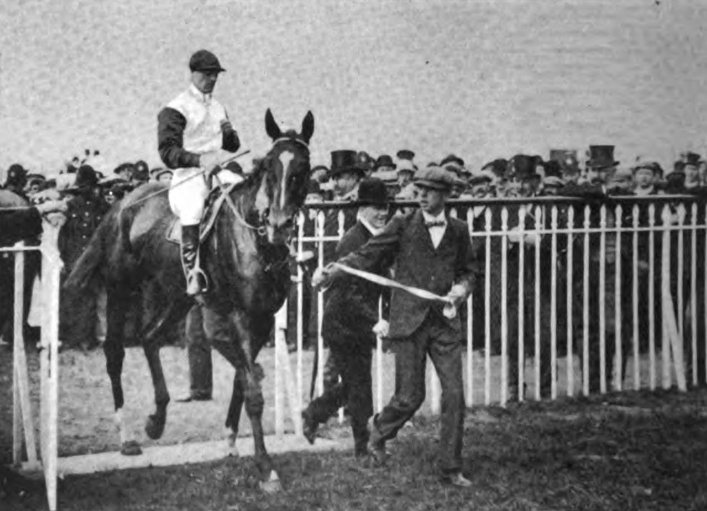
- William the Third with Morny Cannon up at Ascot Gold Cup
- Sire: St Simon
- Grandsire: Galopin
- Dam: Gravity
- Damsire: Wisdom
- Sex: Stallion
- Foaled: 1898
- Country: United Kingdom
- Colour: Bay
- Breeder: William Cavendish-Bentinck, 6th Duke of Portland
- Owner: 6th Duke of Portland
- Trainer: John Porter
- Record: 14:10-2-0

Major wins
- Newmarket Stakes (1901); Ascot Gold Cup (1902); Queen Alexandra Stakes (1902); Doncaster Cup (1902)

William the Third (1898–1917) was a British Thoroughbred racehorse and sire. After finishing unplaced on his only race as a two-year-old in 1900, he won five times in 1901 as well as finishing second in The Derby. He reached his peak as a four-year-old, winning five consecutive races including the Ascot Gold Cup, Queen Alexandra Stakes and Doncaster Cup. His career was ended by injury in early 1903 and he was retired to stud, where he had considerable success as a sire of winners.

== Background ==
William the Third was a bay horse with a narrow white blaze and two white socks bred by his owner William Cavendish-Bentinck, 6th Duke of Portland. Like most of the Duke's horses, he was trained by John Porter at his Kingsclere Stables near Newbury, Berkshire. When fully grown he stood 16 hands high and was described as being of "superb quality" with a "beautiful and intelligent" head.

William the Third was one of the last notable horses sired by St. Simon, an undefeated racehorse who was considered one of the best British runners of the 19th Century. In an outstanding stud career he won nine sires’ championships, having sired ten Classic winners. His dam, Gravity, was a daughter of the influential broodmare Enigma, the direct female ancestor of many major winners including Reigh Count, Candy Spots and Martial. Gravity herself produced William the Third's full-sister Gravitation, the great-great-granddam of the American Horse of the Year Granville.

== Racing career ==
=== 1900: two-year-old season ===
William the Third showed little immediate promise as a two-year-old and made only one racecourse appearance. In October he ran in the Clearwell Stakes over five furlongs at Newmarket Racecourse and finished unplaced.

=== 1901: three-year-old season ===
In the spring of 1901, William the Third showed much improved form. On his first appearance as a three-year-old he won the Wood Ditton Stakes at Newmarket in April by six lengths. He was then sent to Sandown Park in early May where he won the Esher Stakes, again by six lengths. Later that month, the colt established himself as a classic contender when he won the ten furlong Newmarket Stakes by a short head, beating Doricles, a horse who finished second in the 2000 Guineas on his previous start.

William the Third was then sent to Epsom Downs Racecourse to contest the 122nd running of the Derby Stakes for which he started at odds of 100/7 in a field of twenty-five runners. Ridden by Morny Cannon, he turned into the straight in seventh place and moved up to second approaching the final furlong, but although he "struggled on hard" he was beaten three quarters of a length by Volodyovski, four lengths clear of the remainder. William the Third and Volodyovski met again in the Lennox Stakes at Hurst Park in August. Carrying three pounds less than his opponent, the Duke's colt defeated the Derby winner by a head. William the Third had not been entered for the St Leger Stakes (won by Doricles), and ended his season by running against older horses for the first time in the Kempton Park Stakes. He ran disappointingly, finishing unplaced behind the four-year-old gelding Epsom Lad.

=== 1902: four-year-old season ===
William the Third won his first five races of 1902, proving himself the best stayer of the year in England. On his debut he was sent to Royal Ascot for the two-and-a-half-mile Gold Cup which attracted an extremely strong field. The runners included the classic winners Volodyovski and Cap and Bells (Epsom Oaks), the leading British older horses Osbech (Coronation Cup) and Santoi (1901 Ascot Gold Cup), and the French challengers Cheri (Grand Prix de Paris) and La Camargo (Prix de Diane). The day attracted a large and fashionable crowd to Ascot, including the Queen and the Prince and Princess of Wales Ridden by Morny Cannon, William the Third, who started the 2/1 favourite, was held up towards the back of the field of runners until the straight. He then accelerated past his rivals and won easily by five lengths to record a popular victory. The winner reappeared the following afternoon for the Queen Alexandra Stakes over two miles and six furlongs. Despite carrying top weight of 136 pounds, he won by six lengths.

After a three-month break, William the Third returned in September for the Doncaster Cup and won by eight lengths at odds of 1/10. At Newmarket in October he walked over in the Lowther Stakes when no horse appeared to oppose him and then wonn the Limekiln Stakes over one and a half miles. On his final start of the season he started odds on favourite for the two-and-a-half-mile Jockey Club Cup but was surprisingly beaten by the Cesarewitch Handicap winner Black Sand.

William the Third remained in training as a five-year-old but sustained a serious pastern injury in training and was retired to stud without racing again.

== Assessment ==
In their book A Century of Champions, based on an adaptation of the Timeform system, John Randall and Tony Morris awarded William the Third a rating of 135, making him a "superior" Gold Cup winner, and the best British racehorse of his generation.

== Stud career ==
William the Third was retired to become a breeding stallion at his owner's stud at Welbeck Abbey. He was a successful sire of winners, twice finishing second in the sires' championship. His only classic winner was the 1000 Guineas winner Winkipop (later a successful broodmare). He died suddenly of a cerebral haemorrhage at Welbeck on 21 February 1917. Five years later he was Leading broodmare sire in Great Britain & Ireland.

== Sire line tree ==
- William The Third
  - Willonyx
  - King William
    - Holbeach
  - Sandal
    - Macon
  - Wrinkler
  - Rembrandt
  - Pilliwinkie
    - Olibrius
  - Beau Bill
    - Thrown In
  - Winkie
  - Nassovian
    - Nassau

== Pedigree ==
Pedigree of William the Third (GB), bay stallion, 1898
Sire St Simon (GB) 1881	Galopin; 1872	Vedette	Voltigeur
Sire St Simon (GB) 1881	Galopin; 1872	Vedette	Mrs Ridgeway
Sire St Simon (GB) 1881	Galopin; 1872	Flying Duchess	The Flying Dutchman
Sire St Simon (GB) 1881	Galopin; 1872	Flying Duchess	Merope
Sire St Simon (GB) 1881	St Angela; 1865	King Tom	Harkaway
Sire St Simon (GB) 1881	St Angela; 1865	King Tom	Pocahontas*^
Sire St Simon (GB) 1881	St Angela; 1865	Adeline	Ion*^
Sire St Simon (GB) 1881	St Angela; 1865	Adeline	Little Fairy
Dam Gravity (GB) 1884	Wisdom; 1873	Blinkhoolie	Rataplan^
Dam Gravity (GB) 1884	Wisdom; 1873	Blinkhoolie	Queen Mary
Dam Gravity (GB) 1884	Wisdom; 1873	Aline	Stockwell^
Dam Gravity (GB) 1884	Wisdom; 1873	Aline	Jeu d'Esprit
Dam Gravity (GB) 1884	Enigma; 1872	The Rake	Wild Dayrell^
Dam Gravity (GB) 1884	Enigma; 1872	The Rake	England's Beauty
Dam Gravity (GB) 1884	Enigma; 1872	The Sphinx	Newminster
Dam Gravity (GB) 1884	Enigma; 1872	The Sphinx	Madame Stodare (Family:2-e)

*^ William the Third is inbred 4S x 5D x 5D to the mare Pocahontas, meaning that she appears fourth generation once on the sire side of his pedigree and fifth generation twice (via Rataplan and Stockwell)^ on the dam side of his pedigree.

*^ William the Third is inbred 4S x 5D to the stallion Ion, meaning that he appears fourth generation on the sire side of his pedigree and fifth generation (via Wild Dayrell)^ on the dam side of his pedigree.
