= Gran Premio Nacional (Argentina) =

- Class: Group 1
- Inaugurated: 1884
- Race type: Flat / Thoroughbred

Race information
- Distance: 2,500 metres (1.6 mi)
- Surface: Dirt
- Track: Hipódromo Argentino de Palermo
- Qualification: Three-Year-Olds
- Weight: 57 kg
- Purse: $255,600,000 ARS (2025); 1st: $120,000,000 ARS

The Gran Premio Nacional, or Argentine Derby, is a Group 1 flat horse race in Argentina open to three-year-olds run over a distance of 2,500 metres (1.6 mi) at Hipódromo Argentino de Palermo. It is the third race in the Argentinian Triple Crown and is one of the oldest and most influential races in Latin American racing.

== History ==
The Gran Premio Nacional has been run at Hipódromo Argentino de Palermo annually since 1884.

By 1923, the year the Uruguayan entry Sisley won, the purse was worth $40,000.

In 1933, the favorite Hasta Hoy was attacked by masked men the night before the race. His attendant was held at gunpoint while Hasta Hoy's abdomen was stabbed. Hasta Hoy was left unable to run, leaving Requiebro and Támesis to dead heat for first in a field of ten, the smallest in the race up to that point.

In 2022, SIS (Sports Information Services) began sponsoring the race.

== Records since 1988 ==
Speed record:

- 2:31.65 – Chullo (1997)

Largest margin of victory:

- 15 lengths – Great Escape (2020)

Longest odds winner:

- 107.10 – Priest (1992)

Shortest odds winner:

- 1.55 – Refinado Tom (1996)

Most wins by a jockey:

- 4 – Juan Carlos Noriega (1998, 2001, 2003, 2004)

Most wins by a trainer:

- 5 – Roberto Pellegatta (2001, 2003, 2004, 2005, 2023)
- 3 – Jorge A. Mayansky Neer (2013, 2017, 2020)

Most wins by an owner:

- 2 – F.F.C. (2001, 2004)
- 2 – Haras La Providencia (2002, 2015)
- 2 – S. de B. (2014, 2018)

Most wins by a breeder:

- 4 – Haras Abolengo (2010, 2013, 2020, 2023)
- 3 – Haras La Biznaga (1990, 1996, 2009)
- 2 – Haras La Quebrada (1993, 1994)
- 2 – Haras de la Pomme (1995, 2019)

== Winners since 1988 ==
Year	Winner	Jockey	Trainer	Owner	Breeder	Time	Margin	Odds	Ref
2025	Gordianus	Cristian E. Velázquez	Hugo Miguel Pérez Sisto	Stud El Olimpo	Haras Tiveres	2:38.23	1 1/2 lengths	13.80	
2024	Cuan Chef	Eduardo Ortega Pavón	Alfredo F. Gaitán Dassié	Establec. Mariana Eva (SI)	Haras Pozo de Luna	2:36.72	9 lengths	6.25	
2023	Ever Daddy	William Pereyra	Roberto Pellegatta	Tramo 20 (SDE)	Haras Abolengo	2:34.67	5 lengths	2.25	
2022	Niño Guapo	William Pereyra	Juan Franco Saldivia	Garabo	Haras El Chañar	2:33.55	4 lengths	1.90	
2021	Irwin	Goncalves F. Fernandes	Javier Alejandro Fren	Volver al Futuro (LP)	Haras Carampangue	2:34.80	9 lengths	3.20	
2020	Great Escape	Juan Cruz Villagra	Jorge A. Mayansky Neer	La Frontera (MZA)	Haras Abolengo	2:37.78	15 lengths	2.20	
2019	Miriñaque	Goncalves F. Fernandes	Maria Cristina Muñoz	Parque Patricios	Haras de la Pomme	2:33.89	1 1/2 lengths	5.80	
2018	For the Top	Wilson Rosario Moreyra	Gustavo Ernesto Romero	S. de B.	Haras El Turf	2:33.78	5 lengths	12.20	
2017	Roman Rosso	Wilson Rosario Moreyra	Jorge A. Mayansky Neer	La Primavera (LP)	Haras Melincue	2:34.29	6 lengths	12.90	
2016	He Runs Away	Rodrigo Gonzalo Blanco	Gustavo Ernesto Romero	The Guante (LP)	Haras Santa Maria de Araras	2:38.51	4 lengths	5.15	
2015	Hi Happy	Altair Domingoes	Pedro Nickel	Haras La Providencia	Haras La Providencia	2:34.69	Neck	3.00	
2014	El Moises	Cardenas E. Talaverano	Gregorio Bernardo Vivas	S. de B.	Haras Don Arcangel	2:34.90	Neck	2.30	
2013	Cooptado	Rodrigo Gonzalo Blanco	Jorge A. Mayansky Neer	Los de Areco	Haras Abolengo	2:33.12	3/4 lengths	4.35	
2012	Indy Point	Gonzalo Hahn	Raul Alberto Ramallo	Gus-May-Fer (LP)	Felipe Lovisi	2:35.22	3 lengths	2.10	
2011	Lange	Juan Pablo Lagos	Pablo Pedro Sahagian	La Pampita	Haras El Mallin	2:37.64	3 lengths	32.10	
2010	Expressive Halo	Gustavo E. Calgente	Carlos A. Meza Brunel	Axel (LP)	Haras Abolengo	2:36.88	1 length	8.85	
2009	Storm Chispazo	Jose Ricardo Mendez	Alfredo F. Gaitan Dassie	Las Hormigas (SI)	Haras La Biznaga	2:35.11	3 lengths	6.20	
2008	Tecla Shiner	Adrian M. Giannetti	Hugo Miguel Perez Sisto	Stud Three Friends	Inversiones y Proyectos Creole S.A. & Haras San José de El Socorro	2:37.84	2 1/2 lengths	11.10	
2007	Eyeofthetiger	Cardenas E. Talaverano	Ricardo A. Reigart	Don David [X]	Alessandro Arcangeli	2:35.55	1 1/2 lengths	14.95	
2006	Eu Tambem	Joao H. Moreira	Neto Victorio Fornasaro	Joao Bayadjian	Haras Guaiuvira	2:35.61	1 1/2 lengths	4.10	
2005	Forty Licks	Horacio Julian Betansos	Roberto Pellegatta	El Wing (SI)	Haras Arroyo de Luna	2:38.84	1 1/2 lengths	4.95	
2004	Basko Pinton	Juan Carlos Noriega	Roberto Pellegatta	F.F.C.	Haras Usasti	2:35.28	2 lengths	2.85	
2003	Mr. Alleva	Juan Carlos Noriega	Roberto Pellegatta	Bingo Horse (SI)	Haras Firmamento	2:36.48	10 lengths	2.10	
2002	Freddy	Jorge Valdivieso	Alves Jose Martins	Haras La Providencia	Antonio Gilberto Depieri	2:34.35	2 1/2 lengths	2.10	
2001	Dr. Ciro	Juan Carlos Noriega	Roberto Pellegatta	F.F.C.	J. Zubizarreta and Jorge O. Curutchet	2:37.42	1 length	5.00	
2000	Tapatio	Fabian Antonio Rivero	Eduardo Carlos Tadei	Car-Jul (SI)	Haras Las Ortijas	2:36.22	4 lengths	3.20	
1999	Litigado	Pablo Gustavo Falero	Juan Carlos Maldotti	Haras Vacacion	Haras Vacacion	2:35.22	7 lengths	1.95	
1998	Potrizaris ƒ	Juan Carlos Noriega	Diego Peña	Tori	Haras La Madrugada	2:34.45	1 1/2 lengths	5.65	
1997	Chullo	Oscar Fabian Conti	Eduardo M. Martine de Hoz	Haras San Pablo	Haras San Pablo	2:31.65	4 lengths	2.00	
1996	Refinado Tom	Jorge Valdivieso	Roberto M. Bullrich	Haras La Biznaga	Haras La Biznaga	2:33.84	Neck	1.55	
1995	Gentlemen	Jacinto Rafael Herrera	Juan Carlos Etchechoury	Haras de la Pomme	Haras de la Pomme	2:36.10	1 1/2 lengths	6.10	
1994	Cheerful	Guillermo Enrique Sena	Domingo Elias Pascual	Don Elias	Haras La Quebrada	2:35.44	3 lengths	5.60	
1993	Hangar	Jacinto Rafael Herrea	Juan Carlos Etchechoury	Haras La Quebrada	Haras La Quebrada	2:34.57	1 length	20.20	
1992	Priest	Osvaldo Daniel Davila		De Setiembre	Haras El Candil	2:38.08	1/2 head	107.10	
1991	L'Express	Jose Luis Batruni	Angel Adami	Haras La Borinqueña	Haras La Borinqueña	2:39.93	Nose	4.00	
1990	Fanatic Boy	Oscar Fabian Conti	Gustavo E. Scarpello	Bakane S	Haras La Biznaga	2:37.90		2.00	
1989	Cheyenne	Walter Hugo Serrudo	Santillan G. Frenkel	Haras Doña Pancha	Haras Doña Pancha	2:36.12	10 lengths	7.20	
1988	Indalecio		Luis Edmundo Villamil	Rodeo Chico	Haras La Irenita	2:33.37		13.00	

ƒ designates a filly winner

== Earlier winners ==
- 1884: Souvenir
- 1885: Surplice
- 1886: Stiletto
- 1887: Condesa ƒ
- 1888: Osiris
- 1889: Bolívar
- 1890: San Martín
- 1891: Amianto
- 1892: Niobe
- 1893: Buenos Aires
- 1894: Porteña ƒ & General Lavalle (DH)
- 1895: Porteño
- 1896: Purrán
- 1897: Orange
- 1898: Le Sancy
- 1899: Valero
- 1900: Cordon Rouge
- 1901: Druid
- 1902: Pippermint
- 1903: Américo
- 1904: Old Man
- 1905: Floreal
- 1906: Melgarejo
- 1907: Sibila ƒ
- 1908: Chopp
- 1909: Ajó
- 1910: Espirita ƒ
- 1911: As de Espadas
- 1912: San Jorge
- 1913: Primicio
- 1914: Smasher
- 1915: Packoy
- 1916: Saint Emilion
- 1917: Botafogo
- 1918: Omega ƒ
- 1919: Tiny
- 1920: Gaulois
- 1921: Pulgarin
- 1922: Rico
- 1923: Sisley
- 1924: Lombardo
- 1925: Macón
- 1926: Quemao
- 1927: Bermejo
- 1928: Fanfurriña ƒ
- 1929: Lacio
- 1930: Sierra Balcarce ƒ
- 1931: Mineral
- 1932: Payaso
- 1933: Requiebro & Támesis (DH)
- 1934: Silfo
- 1935: Ix
- 1936: Camerino
- 1937: Quemaita ƒ
- 1938: Sorteado
- 1939: Embrujo
- 1940: La Mission ƒ
- 1941: Bubalcó
- 1942: Banderín
- 1943: Avestruz
- 1944: Churrinche
- 1945: Miss Grillo ƒ
- 1946: Seductor
- 1947: Doubtless II
- 1948: Penny Post
- 1949: Swing
- 1950: Egipto
- 1951: Yatasto
- 1952: Branding
- 1953: Romantic
- 1954: Heroico
- 1955: Tatán
- 1956: Labrador
- 1957: Picado
- 1958: Manantial
- 1959: Mamboretá
- 1960: Troubadour
- 1961: Sobresalto
- 1962: Irmak
- 1963: Trousseau
- 1964: Gobernado
- 1965: Tai
- 1966: Forli
- 1967: Ribereño
- 1968: Indian Chief
- 1969: Practicante
- 1970: Duncan
- 1971: Uruguayo
- 1972: Hekatón
- 1973: Moraes Tinto
- 1974: El Gran Capitán
- 1975: Kalabana ƒ
- 1976: Serxens
- 1977: Alatón
- 1978: Telescópico
- 1979: Acertijo
- 1980: Pretencioso
- 1981: I'm Glad
- 1982: Clorhidratante
- 1983: Fatly
- 1984: Pelotari
- 1985: Potrillazo
- 1986: El Serrano
- 1987: Mat Dancer

ƒ indicates a filly
