= Gran Premio Seleccion =

- Class: Group 1
- Location: Hipódromo Argentino de Palermo; Buenos Aires, Argentina
- Inaugurated: 1893
- Race type: Thoroughbred - Flat racing

Race information
- Distance: 2,000 meters
- Surface: Dirt
- Qualification: 3-year-old fillies
- Purse: $144,200,000 ARS (2026) 1st: $70,000,000 ARS

The Gran Premio Seleccion is a Group 1 thoroughbred horse race in Argentina for three-year-old fillies. The race takes place in October at the Hipódromo Argentino de Palermo. The race is sometimes known as the Argentine Oaks.

== History ==
The Gran Premio Selección was first run in 1893 as the Premio Selección.

The Gran Premio Selección was run at a distance of 2200 meters 1964 to 1977.

== Records since 1988 ==
Speed record:

- 1:59.90 – Blue Baby Blue (1996)

Greatest margin of victory:

- 13 lengths – Rafaga (1989)
- 12 lengths – La Francesca (1991)
- 11 lengths – Balada Sale (2011)

Most wins by a jockey:

- 4 – Jorge Valdivieso (1995, 2000, 2004, 2005)
- 4 – Pablo Gustavo Falero (1997, 2001, 2002, 2011)
- 4 – Juan Carlos Noriega (2007, 2012, 2018, 2021)
- 3 – Edwin Rafael Talaverano Cardenas (2006, 2009, 2010)

Most wins by a trainer:

- 4 – Juan Carlos H. Etchechoury (2003, 2004, 2010, 2013)
- 4 – Juan Franco Saldivia (2018, 2021, 2022, 2024)
- 3 – Juan Carlos Maldotti (1997, 2001, 2002)
- 3 – Juan Sebastian Maldotti (2007, 2011, 2012)

Most wins by an owner:

- 8 – Haras Vacación (1988, 1989, 1995, 1997, 2001, 2002, 2011, 2012)
- 4 – Haras Firmamento (2003, 2006, 2009, 2010)

Most wins by a breeder:

- 6 – Haras Vacación (1988, 1997, 2001, 2002, 2011, 2012)
- 4 – Haras Firmamento (2003, 2006, 2009, 2010)

== Winners since 1988 ==
Winners of Gran Premio Selección
Year	Winner	Jockey	Trainer	Owner	Breeder	Time	Margin	Ref
2026	Robate Un Beso	Adrián M. Giannetti	Alfredo F. Gaitán Dassié	Bonne Chance Farm	Haras Rio Dois Irmaos	2:06.33	Neck	
2025	Charm	Martín Javier Valle	José Cristóbal Blanco	Haras Triple Alliance	Haras Triple Alliance	2:03.94	2 1/2 lengths	
2024	Inconmensurable	William Pereyra	Juan Franco Saldivia	Stud Haras Yo Bru. Gi	Haras Marovi	2:02.32	6 lengths	
2023	Romance Sea	Marcelo Coria Facundo	Juan I. Etchechoury	Rubio B.	Haras La Pasion	2:01.69	3/4 lengths	
2022	Nos Dijimos Todo	Gustavo E. Calvente	Juan Franco Saldivia	Juan Antonio (BV)	Marovi S.A.	2:03.37	6 lengths	
2021	Carta Embrujada	Juan Carlos Noriega	Juan Franco Saldivia	Haras La Leyenda	Haras La Leyenda de Areco	2:00.62	Neck	
2020	Mumy Beach	Marcelo Coria Facundo	Edgar Oscar Martucci	Rodolfo Pedro	Haras Estancia La Josefina	2:03.25	3/4 lengths	
2019	Nastia	Fabricio Raúl Barroso	Roberto M. Bullrich	Mme. Fabre (SI)	Haras La Biznaga	2:02.55	4 lengths	
2018	Summer Love	Juan Carlos Noriega	Juan Franco Saldivia	Haras La Leyenda	Haras La Leyenda de Areco	2:00.90	1/2 lengths	
2017	Care Lady	Eduardo Antonio Ruarte	Antonio H. Marsiglia	Los Cardones	Haras Abolengo	2:01.25	2 1/2 lengths	
2016	Blue Prize	Francisco Leandro Fernandes Gonçalves	Jorge A. Mayansky Neer	La Manija	Haras Bioart S. A.	2:01.15	1/2 neck	
2015	Doña Joya	Adrián Maximiliano Giannetti	Carlos D. Etchechoury	Haras San Benito	Haras San Benito	2:02.74	8 lengths	
2014	Kalithea	Altair Domingos	Juan Bautista Udaondo	Haras Santa Ines	Haras Santa Ines	2:01.94	2 lengths	
2013	Mary's Gold	Juan Cruz Villagra	Juan Carlos H. Etchechoury	Rubio B.	Haras Abolengo	2:00.54	3 lengths	
2012	Caldine	Juan Carlos Noriega	Juan Sebatian Maldotti	Haras Vacación	Haras Vacación	2:02.43	Neck	
2011	Balada Sale	Pablo Gustavo Falero	Juan Sebatian Maldotti	Haras Vacación	Haras Vacación	2:03.09	11 lengths	
2010	Catch the Mad	Edwin Rafael Talaverano Cardenas	Juan Carlos H. Etchechoury	Haras Firmamento	Haras Firmamento	2:04.08	2 1/2 lengths	
2009	Kalath Wells	Edwin Rafael Talaverano Cardenas	Miguel Angel Garcia	Haras Firmamento	Haras Firmamento	2:01.71	4 lengths	
2008	Miss Match	Julio Cesar Mendez	Maria Virginia Pascual	Haras Bonaventura	Haras La Quebrada	2:03.75	3 lengths	
2007	Fiesta Lady	Juan Carlos Noriega	Juan Sebatian Maldotti	Haras La Esperanza	Haras La Esperanza	2:02.21	6 lengths	
2006	Emotion Parade	Edwin Rafael Talaverano Cardenas	Miguel Angel Garcia	Haras Firmamento	Haras Firmamento	2:04.52	2 1/2 lengths	
2005	Kesplendida	Jorge Valdivieso	Adolfo P. Giovanetti	Haras Santa Maria de Araras	Haras Santa Maria de Araras	2:05.94	Nose	
2004	Forty Marchanta	Jorge Valdivieso	Juan Carlos H. Etchechoury	Haras La Biznaga	Haras La Biznaga	2:03.33	1/2 lengths	
2003	Perugia Wells	Damian Ramella	Juan Carlos H. Etchechoury	Haras Firmamento	Haras Firmamento	2:03.42	6 lengths	
2002	Semblanza	Pablo Gustavo Falero	Juan Carlos Maldotti	Haras Vacación	Haras Vacación	2:05.02	3 lengths	
2001	Netherland	Pablo Gustavo Falero	Juan Carlos Maldotti	Haras Vacación	Haras Vacación	2:01.50	7 lengths	
2000	Miss Linda	Jorge Valdivieso	Roberto M. Bullrich	Haras Triunvirato	Haras La Quebrada	2:03.03	1 1/2 lengths	
1999	Lovellon	Jacinto Rafael Herrera	Diego Peña	Haras P.G.R. (SI)	Haras La Madrugada	2:04.74	DQ	
1998	Potrizaris	Jacinto Rafael Herrera	Diego Peña	Haras Tori	Haras La Madrugada	2:00.78	9 lengths	
1997	Croassant	Pablo Gustavo Falero	Juan Carlos Maldotti	Haras Vacación	Haras Vacación	2:00.23	3/4 lengths	
1996	Blue Baby Blue	Guillermo Sena	Domingo E. Pascual	Haras Santa Maria de Araras	Haras Santa Maria de Araras	1:59.90	v.m.	
1995	Ski Iberia	Jorge Valdivieso	Carlos D. Etchechoury	Haras Vacación		2:00.23	6 lengths	
1994	Catch-It	Ricardo Rodolfo Ioselli	Martin R. Ferreyra	Haras Un Sueño (LP)		2:01.55	Nose	
1993	War Chest	Walter H. Serrudo	Hugo R. Lopez	Haras Cristi (LP)		2:02.22	4 lengths	
1992	Farah Elius	Jose A. Aguero		Haras Ni Manor		2:02.28	2 lengths	
1991	La Francesa	Ruben Emilio Laitan	Carlos Alberto Zarlengo	Haras La Quebrada	Haras La Quebrada	2:06.72	12 lengths	
1990	Campagnarde	Eduardo A. Liceri		Haras Las Ortigas	Haras Las Ortigas	2:02.57	1 1/2 lengths	
1989	Rafaga		Pedro A. Cacibar	Haras Vacación	Haras Vacación	2:04.93	13 lengths	
1988	Rosadora	Juan A. Maciel	Marcelo P. Saravi	Haras Vacación	Haras de la Pomme	2:16.11	4 lengths	

== Earlier winners ==
- 1893: Etoile
- 1894: Porteña
- 1895: Rose Royale
- 1896: Colombia
- 1897: Tarántula
- 1898: Friolera & Espina (DH)
- 1899: Parva
- 1900: Fantasía
- 1901: Cina-Cina
- 1902: Partícula
- 1903: Breva
- 1904: Rosette
- 1905: Primera Tiple
- 1906: Droga
- 1907: Rangacua
- 1908: Rubicela
- 1909: Casiopea
- 1910: Locandiera
- 1911: Pirita
- 1912: Brilla & Flying Star (DH)
- 1913: Indiecita
- 1914: Avicenia
- 1915: Ocurrencia
- 1916: Cantaridina
- 1917: Divinidad
- 1918: Omega
- 1919: Cartagena
- 1920: Democracia
- 1921: Lye
- 1922: Pilmayquen
- 1923: La Patria
- 1924: Sarcástica
- 1925: Nena
- 1926: Villanita
- 1927: La Cloche
- 1928: Monsega
- 1929: Salmuera & Catarata (DH)
- 1930: Aimará
- 1931: Côte d'Or
- 1932: Fe Ciega
- 1933: Nudité
- 1934: Black Arrow
- 1935: Hear!
- 1936: Elida
- 1937: Hulla
- Not run in 1938
- 1939: Heil! (previously known as Yamile)
- 1940: Judea
- 1941: Blackie
- 1942: Dalilah
- 1943: Platería
- 1944: True Lady
- 1945: Miss Grillo
- 1946: Pinturera
- 1947: Bullanquera
- 1948: Empeñosa
- 1949: White Milk
- 1950: Foxona
- 1951: Duty
- 1952: Jubilosa
- 1953: Sidérea
- 1954: Nyleptha
- 1955: Ansiedad
- 1956: Yauca
- 1957: Carlinga
- 1958: Pensilvania
- 1959: Frisky
- 1960: Cantadora
- 1961: Pasión
- 1962: Contrabrava
- 1963: Argentaria
- 1964: Luanda
- 1965: Sweet Sue
- 1966: Tebas
- 1967: Rafale
- 1968: Farm
- 1969: La Sevillana
- 1970: Olvida
- 1971: Jungle Duchess
- 1972: Sena
- 1973: Bola de Cristal
- 1974: Contraventora
- 1975: Maia
- 1976: Surera
- 1977: Mía
- 1978: Seed
- 1979: Love's Hope
- 1980: Tangaroa
- 1981: Almira
- 1982: Miss Keat
- 1983: Goldenley
- 1984: So Flag
- 1985: Agigantada
- 1986: Hanzacal
- 1987: Abloom

*Dead heats occurred in 1898 (between Friolera and Espina), 1912 (between Brilla and Flying Star), 1929 (Salmuera and Catarata)
