= Da Hoss =

American-bred Thoroughbred racehorse (1992–2022)

- Da Hoss during a show at the Kentucky Horse Park
- Sire: Gone West
- Grandsire: Mr. Prospector
- Dam: Jolly Saint
- Damsire: Welsh Saint
- Sex: Gelding
- Foaled: January 18, 1992
- Died: January 2, 2022 (aged 29)
- Country: United States
- Colour: Bay
- Breeder: Fares Farms
- Owner: Wallstreet Racing Stables; Prestonwood Farm (1996)
- Trainer: Michael Dickinson
- Record: 20: 12-5-2
- Earnings: $1,931,558

Major wins
- Best Turn Stakes (1995); Jersey Derby (1995); Del Mar Derby (1995); Fourstardave Handicap (1996); Pennsylvania Governor's Cup Handicap (1996); Breeders' Cup wins: Breeders' Cup Mile (1996, 1998)

Honours
- Kentucky-bred Turf Horse Male (1998)
- Last updated on January 1, 2008

Da Hoss (January 18, 1992 – January 2, 2022) was a champion Thoroughbred gelding best known for winning the Breeders' Cup Mile two times.

== Background ==
He was bred in Kentucky by Fares Farms and originally owned by Prestonwood Farm as well as Wallstreet Racing Stables.

Da Hoss was purchased for $6,000 as a yearling at the Keeneland Sales, by Kevin Eikleberry and Clifford Thygesen, bringing the lowest price for a Gone West yearling for all of 1993. The horse had physical problems, bone spurs in his hocks, and a previously infected hoof that had rotted away part of his coffin bone. After being purchased, and determined to be healthy enough to attempt a racing career, Da Hoss was taken to Turf Paradise in Phoenix, Arizona.

== Racing career ==
=== 1994–1996: Early career ===
Da Hoss was undefeated in his two-year-old season, consisting of three starts. After winning his first race, at Turf Paradise, by one length, he followed that effort with an allowance score before concluding his first season on the racetrack with a stakes win, the ATBA Sales Stakes, where he completed the six-furlong distance in a then-record time of 1:07 1/5.

In his first start at three, Da Hoss took the Grade III 'Best Turn Stakes (now known as the Jimmy Winkfield Stakes), the Grade II Jersey Derby, and the Grade II Del Mar Derby, and came second in the Grade II Gotham Stakes, Illinois Stakes, Swaps Stakes, and Pegasus Stakes in addition to winning another allowance. The horse he finished second to in the GII Swaps Stakes was that year's Kentucky Derby and Belmont winner, Thunder Gulch. He also ran third in the G1 Hollywood Derby. In his first Breeders’ Cup appearance, the 1995 Breeders’ Cup Sprint on dirt, Da Hoss finished 13th; it was the only time in his 20-race career that he failed to hit the board.

1996 began with a third-place finish in the Poker Handicap at Belmont Park, and Da Hoss found himself in the winner's circle again in his next start, the G3 Fourstardave Handicap. Next was a win in the Pennsylvania Governor's Cup Handicap, then a second in the Kelso Handicap, before entering the starting gate at Woodbine for the 1996 Breeders’ Cup Mile under jockey Gary Stevens. Da Hoss won by one and a half lengths to the call of "it's da American, Da Hoss, in da Mile!"

Da Hoss did not race again for 715 days.

=== 1998: Comeback ===
Da Hoss' physical problems kept him out of the starting gate for nearly two years. Each time they put him back into serious training, Dickinson said, he overexerted himself, causing an injury to flare up and putting him back on the sidelines. Dickinson was determined to get the horse back to the Breeders’ Cup, but by the fall of 1998, he was running out of time. There was time for only one prep race for the 1998 Mile, which was an allowance event at Colonial Downs written specifically to get the horse in a race. After Da Hoss won by three parts of a length, Dickinson entered him in the 1998 Breeders’ Cup Mile. It is likely the horse would have been refused entry had he not won the allowance, as the committee wanted to avoid another incident like Ricks Natural Star. Dickinson wanted Gary Stevens to ride Da Hoss, but the jockey's agent, Ron Anderson, had committed him to another horse. John Velazquez took the mount, and Dickinson challenged Anderson to a $1,000 personal bet as to who would finish in front of the other - Da Hoss or Among Men, who Anderson had put Stevens on for the race.

After a delayed start caused by several horses not wanting to load in the gate, Da Hoss settled in sixth in the early stages of the race, allowing the speed horses to battle it out in front of him, and was among those closing in on Favorite Trick heading to the final straight. Da Hoss neared the front at the top of the stretch. After he reached the front, Hawksley Hill rallied on the outside to take the lead. It seemed that Da Hoss would finish second, but he put his nose back in front just before the wire to take his second Breeders' Cup Mile to the call of announcer Tom Durkin.

The 1998 Mile was Da Hoss' final race. In his twenty starts, he won 12 races, placed in 5 others, and came home third twice. His career earnings amounted to $1,931,558, nearly $3.1 million adjusted for inflation.

Until Ouija Board took her second non-consecutive Breeders' Cup win in 2006, Da Hoss was one of six horses to ever win two Breeders' Cup races and the only one to win in non-consecutive years.

== Retirement ==
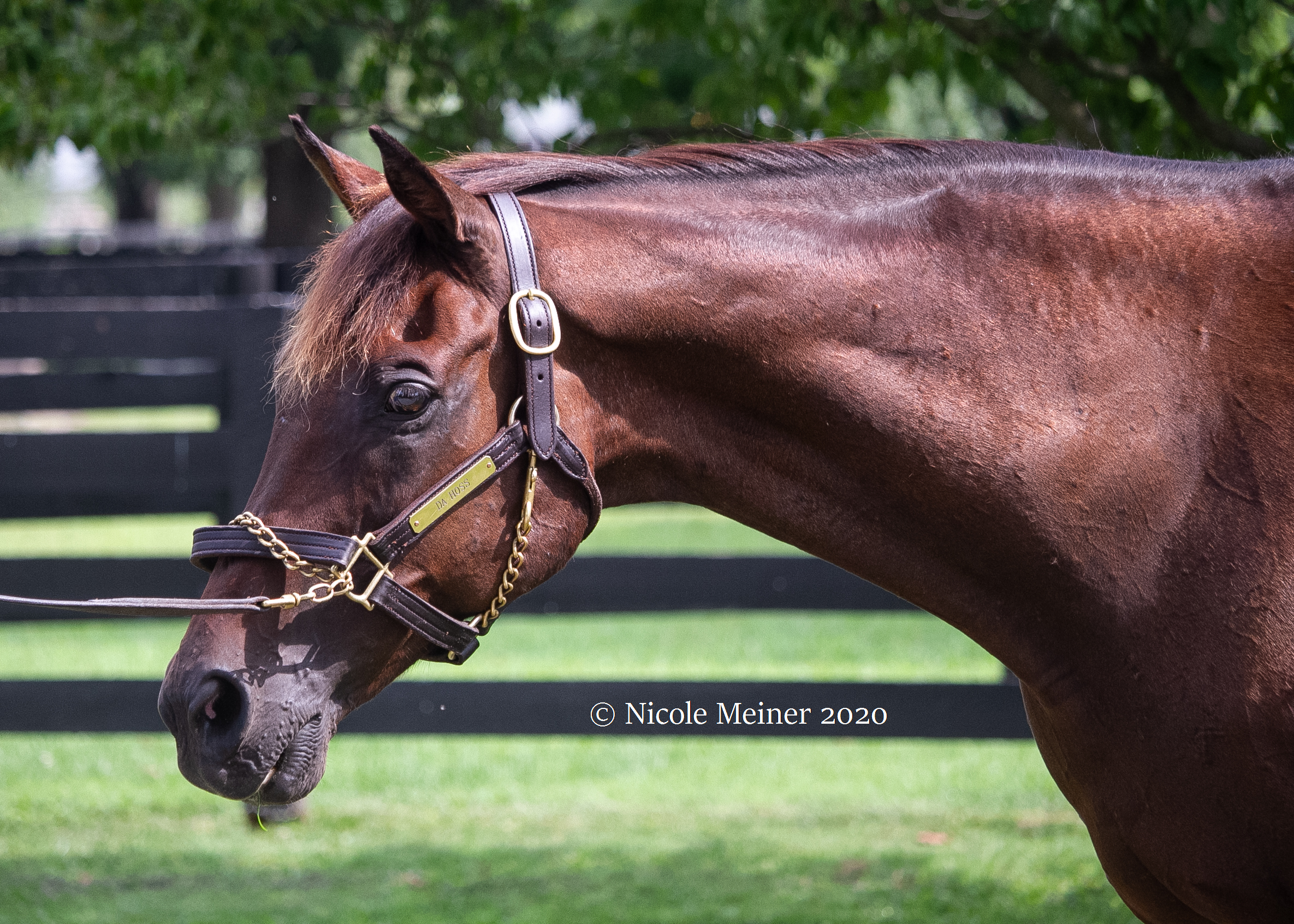
Da Hoss showing outside (due to COVID-19) in the summer of 2020.

Da Hoss lived out his days at the Kentucky Horse Park in the Hall of Champions, in Lexington, Kentucky. He was retired from showing after the 2020 season. He died on January 2, 2022, at the official age of 30, as all Northern Hemisphere born Thoroughbreds turn a year older on January 1.

== Race Record ==
Date	Age	Distance	Race	Grade	Track	Odds	Field	Finish	Winning Time	Winning (Losing) Margin	Jockey	Ref
Sep 24, 1994	2	5 1/2 furlongs	Maiden Special Weight	Maiden	Turf Paradise	*1.30	10	1	1:03.40	1 length	Flavio Martinez III	
Oct 18, 1994	2	6 furlongs	Allowance	Allowance	Turf Paradise	*0.80	8	1	1:09.80	3 lengths	Flavio Martinez III	
Oct 30, 1994	2	6 furlongs	ATBA Sales Stakes	B/T	Turf Paradise	*0.60	12	1	1:07.20	10 lengths	Flavio Martinez III	
Mar 4, 1995	3	6 furlongs	Best Turn Stakes	III	Aqueduct	2.35	9	1	1:11.27	3 lengths	Michael Luzzi	
Mar 25, 1995	3	1 mile	Gotham Stakes	II	Aqueduct	*1.60	11	2	1:36.82	(7 lengths)	Michael Luzzi	
Apr 29, 1995	3	1 mile	Allowance	Allowance	Garden State Park	*0.40	6	1	1:36.78	1 1/4 lengths	Donald Miller Jr.	
May 13, 1995	3	1 1/8 miles	Illinois Derby	II	Sportsman's Park	7.30	13	2	1:48.99	(2 lengths)	Garrett Gomez	
May 27, 1995	3	1 1/16 miles	Jersey Derby	II	Garden State Park	*1.60	10	1	1:43.01	1/2 lengths	Julie Krone	
Jul 23, 1995	3	1 1/8 miles	Swaps Stakes	II	Hollywood Park	9.40	7	2	1:40.09	(2 lengths)	Chris McCarron	
Sep 4, 1995	3	1 1/8 miles	Del Mar Invitational Derby	II	Del Mar	4.00	9	1	1:48.08	2 lengths	Rene Douglas	
Sep 22, 1995	3	1 1/16 miles	Pegasus Handicap	II	Meadowlands	*0.40	4	2	1:40.27	(5 1/4 lengths)	Jerry Bailey	
Oct 28, 1995	3	6 furlongs	Breeders' Cup Sprint	I	Belmont Park	10.50	13	13	1:09.14	(27 lengths)	Jerry Bailey	
Nov 26, 1995	3	1 1/8 miles	Hollywood Derby	I	Hollywood Park	3.20	13	3	1:46.42	(5 lengths)	Corey Nakatani	
Jul 4, 1996	4	1 mile	Poker Handicap	III	Belmont Park	4.90	10	3	1:35.78	(3 1/4 lengths)	Cornelio Velasquez	
Jul 29, 1996	4	1 1/16 miles	Fourstardave Stakes	III	Saratoga	4.00	13	1	1:40.54	1 1/4 lengths	John Velazquez	
Aug 11, 1996	4	1 1/16 miles	Pennsylvania Governor's Cup Handicap	Listed	Penn National	*0.80	10	1	1:41.20	5 lengths	Frank Alvarado	
Oct 5, 1996	4	1 mile	Kelso Handicap	III	Belmont Park	*1.70	10	2	1:34.42	(head)	Gary Stevens	
Oct 26, 1996	4	1 mile	Breeders' Cup Mile	I	Woodbine	8.45	14	1	1:35.80	1 1/2 lengths	Gary Stevens	
Oct 11, 1998	6	1 1/8 miles	Allowance	Allowance	Colonial Downs	*0.60	6	1	1:49.30	3/4 length	Carlos Marquez Jr.	
Nov 7, 1998	6	1 mile	Breeders' Cup Mile	I	Churchill Downs	11.60	14	1	1:35.27	head	John Velazquez	
