= Soviet Line =

Irish-bred Thoroughbred racehorse

- Sire: Soviet Star
- Grandsire: Nureyev
- Dam: Shore Line
- Damsire: High Line
- Sex: Gelding
- Foaled: 18 March 1990
- Country: Ireland
- Colour: Bay
- Breeder: Cheveley Park Stud
- Owner: Maktoum Al Makroum
- Trainer: Michael Stoute; Kiaran McLaughlin
- Record: 48: 16-8-6
- Earnings: $1,450,130

Major wins
- Hambleton Stakes (1994); Fortune Stakes (1994); Kiveton Park Stakes (1994); Supreme Stakes (1994); Hong Kong International Bowl (1994); Lockinge Stakes (1995, 1996); Firecracker Handicap (1997); Fourstardave Handicap (1997); Robert F. Carey Memorial Handicap (1998); Maker's Mark Mile Stakes (1999)

Soviet Line (foaled 18 March 1990) was an Irish-bred, British-trained Thoroughbred racehorse. He was a durable gelding who raced for seven seasons between 1993 and 1999, showing his best form over the one mile distance, and winning sixteen of his forty-eight races including major races in the United Kingdom, Hong Kong and the United States. He also competed in Ireland, France and Dubai. He won at least one Group or Graded stakes race in each of his last six seasons, a feat which has only been bettered by Cirrus des Aigles.

Originally trained in England by Michael Stoute, he was unraced until his three-year-old season when he won two minor races. In the following year he developed into a top class performer winning the Hambleton Stakes, Fortune Stakes, Kiveton Park Stakes and Supreme Stakes before taking the Hong Kong International Bowl. He went on to win the Lockinge Stakes in 1995 and 1996 before being transferred to the United States where he was trained by Kiaran McLaughlin. He added further major victories in North America, winning the Firecracker Handicap and the Fourstardave Handicap in 1997, the Robert F. Carey Memorial Handicap in 1998 and the Maker's Mark Mile Stakes in 1999.

== Background ==
Soviet Line was a bay horse with a narrow white blaze and four white socks bred in Ireland by his owner Maktoum bin Rashid Al Maktoum, a member of the ruling family of Dubai. He was originally sent into training with Michael Stoute at Newmarket, Suffolk. Soviet Line's owner used Maktoum Al Maktoum, an abbreviation of his full name, for his racing interests in Europe, while in North America his horses ran under the Gainsborough Farm banner.

Soviet Line was sired by Soviet Star, a sprinter-miler whose wins included the Poule d'Essai des Poulains, Sussex Stakes, Prix de la Forêt, July Cup and Prix du Moulin. Soviet Star later became a very successful breeding stallion, siring major winners including Freedom Cry (Prix d'Harcourt), Starcraft, Ashkalani (Poule d'Essai des Poulains, Prix du Moulin), Starborough, Limpid (Grand Prix de Paris) and Pressing (Premio Roma). Soviet Line's dam Shore Line won only one minor race from seven starts but was a good stayer who finished fourth in the 1983 Epsom Oaks. Her grand-dam Dark Finale was also the ancestor of the Irish Oaks winner Pure Grain.

Soviet Line was a very difficult horse to manage and had several quirks including a fondness for peppermint candies: he reportedly ate 31 candies at a single sitting.

== Racing career ==
=== 1993: three-year-old season ===
Soviet Line's racing career began at Leicester Racecourse on 3 April 1993 in a one-mile maiden race which he won at odds of 25/1. He followed up three weeks later at Salisbury winning a minor race over ten furlongs by five lengths. Walter Swinburn then took over as the gelding's regular jockey. Soviet Line failed to win in four subsequent starts that year but produced some promising efforts, starting with a third place in a handicap race at Doncaster Racecourse in May. After a lengthy break he returned for three races in the autumn including a third place in the Listed Darley Stakes at Newmarket Racecourse in October.

=== 1994: four-year-old season ===
After finishing second on his first run as a four-year-old, Soviet Line was assigned weight of 125 pounds for the Hambleton Stakes, a Listed handicap over one mile at York Racecourse on 11 May. He took the lead two furlongs out and held on well in the closing stages to win by half a length from the five-year-old Philidor to record his first important victory. He was then stepped up in class but was not immediately successful, finishing unplaced in the Diomed Stakes and the Queen Anne Stakes. He was sent to Ireland in August and produced a more promising effort in the Desmond Stakes at the Curragh, finishing third to Heart Lake and Bin Ajwaad, but being promoted to second when the "winner" was disqualified. After finishing fourth in the Winter Hill Stakes at Windsor later that month he started 9/2 joint favourite for the Listed Fortune Stakes over one mile at Kempton Park Racecourse. He won his second race of the year as he led a furlong out and prevailed by a length from the three-year-old Polish Laughter.

Six days after his win at Kempton, Soviet Line was stepped back up in class for the Group Three Kiveton Park Stakes at Doncaster. Starting at odds of 4/1 he had considerable trouble in running before obtaining a clear run inside the final furlong and overtook the front-running Maroof in the final strides and won by a neck. At the end of September Soviet Line started 2/1 favourite against eight opponents in the Group Three Supreme Stakes over seven furlongs at Goodwood and won again, taking the lead a furlong out and winning by three quarters of a length from Alanees. In October the gelding was moved up in class again to contest the Group Two Challenge Stakes at Newmarket. He started favourite but was beaten into second by Zieten with First Trump and Piccolo among the unplaced runners.

On his final run of the year Soviet Line was sent to Sha Tin Racecourse in Hong Kong in December to contest the Hong Kong International Bowl, a race which later became the Hong Kong Mile. His thirteen rivals included Heart Lake and Young Ern (Hungerford Stakes) from Europe, Nijinsky's Gold (Kelso Handicap) and Megan's Interco (Shoemaker Stakes) from America, Gold Mountain from Japan and the locally trained Winning Partners (the winner of the race in 1993). After being towards the rear on the final turn, Soviet Line forced his way through the field in the straight, took the lead inside the last 200 metres and won by one and three quarter lengths and a head from Nijinsky's Gold and Heart Lake. An objection to the winner was lodged by the rider of the fourth placed Young Ern but the result was allowed to stand by the racecourse stewards. Michael Stoute praised Swinburn's ride, saying "I'm glad he listened when I said 'don't panic if they go off fast'".

=== 1995: five-year-old season ===
Soviet Line began his third season by making his first appearance at Group One level when he started 2/1 favourite for the Lockinge Stakes over one mile at Newbury on 21 May. His four opponents were Muhtarram, Missed Flight (Sandown Mile), Young Ern and Mutakddim. Swinburn sent the gelding into the lead from the start and Soviet Line ran on well in the closing stages to win by two lengths from Young Ern.

Soviet Line failed to win again in 1995 but produced several good efforts. He finished third in the Queen Anne Stakes and then ran fourth to Sayyedati in the Sussex Stakes although he was relegated to fifth for causing interference in the latter race. In autumn he finished third to Bahri in the Queen Elizabeth II Stakes and second to Harayir in the Challenge Stakes. On his final appearance of the season he was sent to the United States for the Breeders' Cup Mile at Belmont Park and finished sixth of the thirteen runners behind Ridgewood Pearl.

=== 1996: six-year-old season ===
In the spring of 1996, Soviet Line finished unplaced in the Abernant Stakes and was then beaten a short head by Gabr (to whom he was conceding six pounds) in the Sandown Mile. On 18 May the gelding was ridden by Richard Quinn as he attempted to become the first horse in 25 years to win back-to-back runnings of the Lockinge Stakes and started the 13/2 third favourite behind Spectrum and Charnwood Forset. The other four runners included Gabr and the three-year-old Smart Alec. He raced in second behind Gabr before going to the front a furlong out and got the better of Charnwood Forest to win by a neck with a four length gap back to Spectrum in third. After the race Michael Stoute paid tribute to the gelding's work rider Sheena Dunlop, saying "The horse would not be what he is without Sheena. He's not an easy ride at home – he takes a tug and hangs all over the place – and no-one wants to ride him but her. She looks after him, and knows him well and is the greatest factor in his success". Commenting on the horse's future plans he noted that although the horse was "very game" the weight penalty he had to carry as a Group One winner was "a bit of a bugger".

Soviet line failed to reproduce his best form in his three subsequent races. He finished fifth in the Queen Anne Stakes, last of seven behind Mark of Esteem in the Queen Elizabeth II Stakes and ninth of ten behind Alhaarth in the Prix du Rond Point at Longchamp Racecourse in October.

=== 1997: seven-year-old season ===
In April 1997 Soviet Line won at Jebel Ali Racecourse in Dubai and was then sent to race in the United States. He was trained in North America by Kiaran McLaughlin although Mark Hennig also conditioned the horse for some of his races. He finished fifth in the Dixie Stakes at Pimlico Race Course on his debut for his new trainer and then won an allowance race at Belmont Park on 7 June. Three weeks later he contested the Grade III Firecracker Handicap at Churchill Downs in which he was ridden by Pat Day and won by three and a half lengths from Volochine. At Saratoga Race Course on 25 July the gelding started favourite for the Grade III Fourstardave Stakes against six opponents. With Day again in the saddle he took the lead before half way and "dug in gamely" to repel the challenge of Val's Prince and win by a short head. After the race McLaughlin commented "It's neat that he's still doing what he wants to do. His best distance is a mile. He doesn't have a future as a stud, but he enjoys his work" whilst Day said "It wasn't pretty, but we got the job done".

He returned in September to finish fifth to Fortitude in the Belmont Breeders' Cup Handicap and third to Wild Event in the Keeneland Breeders' Cup Mile Stakes. On 8 November he ran for the second time in the Breeders' Cup Mile (run that year at Hollywood Park Racetrack) and finished seventh behind Spinning World.

=== 1998: eight-year-old season ===
In 1998, Soviet Line began his season by finishing fifth in an allowance race at Gulfstream Park in March and then ran second to Lasting Approval in the Maker's Mark Mile Stakes at Keeneland in April. He won an allowance at Belmont in June but then failed to repeat his 1997 win in the Firecracker as he was beaten a nose by the four-year-old Claire's Honor. In July the gelding contested the Grade III Robert F. Carey Memorial Handicap at Hawthorne Race Course and started favourite against nine opponents. Ridden by Shane Sellers he overcame "traffic" problems on the second turn before overtaking the front-running Fun To Run in the closing stages and winning by one and three quarter lengths with Wild Event in third. The winning time of 1:33.4 was a new track record. Sellers, who was riding the horse for the first time said "I ended up about three wide turning for home. Down the stretch the opportunity presented itself. I pointed Soviet Line's nose into it, and he took me home. With that kind of horse you can make those kind of moves".

In his two remaining races of 1998 he finished unplaced in the Fourstardave Handicap and second to Favorite Trick in the Keeneland Breeders' Cup Mile Stakes

=== 1999: nine-year-old season ===
The nine-year-old Soviet Line began his final season by finishing unplaced in an allowance at Gulfstream in March. In April he ran for the second time in the Maker's Mark Mile Stakes in which he was ridden by John Velazquez and started second favourite behind Trail City. After racing in fifth place he moved up to second on the final turn and stayed on strongly in the straight to win by a nose and a neck from Trail City and Rob 'n Gin. After the race the Gainsborough Farm manager Allen Kershaw said "The old man's amazing, isn't he? When they were coming down the stretch, I saw he was caught down on the rail. I figured he was going to be fourth. Then a hole opened up and he shot right through there."

He then finished third to Inkatha in the Red Bank Handicap at Monmouth Park in May before running for the third time in the Firecracker Handicap on 27 June when he finished sixth of the nine runners.

Soviet Line was being prepared for a return to racing in autumn 1999 when he suffered a bruised foot in training and was retired to Maktoum Al Maktoum's Gainsborough Farm in Kentucky.

== Pedigree ==
Pedigree of Soviet Line (IRE), bay gelding, 1990
Sire Soviet Star (USA) 1984	Nureyev (USA); 1977	Northern Dancer	Nearctic
Sire Soviet Star (USA) 1984	Nureyev (USA); 1977	Northern Dancer	Natalma
Sire Soviet Star (USA) 1984	Nureyev (USA); 1977	Special	Forli
Sire Soviet Star (USA) 1984	Nureyev (USA); 1977	Special	Thong
Sire Soviet Star (USA) 1984	Veruschka (FR); 1967	Venture	Relic
Sire Soviet Star (USA) 1984	Veruschka (FR); 1967	Venture	Rose o'Lynn
Sire Soviet Star (USA) 1984	Veruschka (FR); 1967	Marie d'Anjou	Vandale
Sire Soviet Star (USA) 1984	Veruschka (FR); 1967	Marie d'Anjou	Marigold
Dam Shore Line (GB) 1980	High Line (GB); 1966	High Hat	Hyperion
Dam Shore Line (GB) 1980	High Line (GB); 1966	High Hat	Madonna
Dam Shore Line (GB) 1980	High Line (GB); 1966	Time Call	Chanteur
Dam Shore Line (GB) 1980	High Line (GB); 1966	Time Call	Aleria
Dam Shore Line (GB) 1980	Dark Finale (GB); 1965	Javelot	Fast Fox
Dam Shore Line (GB) 1980	Dark Finale (GB); 1965	Javelot	Djaina
Dam Shore Line (GB) 1980	Dark Finale (GB); 1965	Peeky	Epigram
Dam Shore Line (GB) 1980	Dark Finale (GB); 1965	Peeky	Chantage (Family: 14-a)
