= Hambleton Stakes =

Flat horse race in Britain

Betfred Hambleton Handicap
2026
Maybe Not	Cerulean Bay	Shout

Previous years
2025
Old Cock	Sisyphean	La Trinidad
2024
Point Lynas	Northern Express	Bopedro
2023
Croupier	Point Lynas	Northern Express
2022
Cruyff Turn	Brunch	Lion Tower
2021
Kynren	Brunch	Hartswood

2020-2011
2019
What's The Story	Firmament	Hayadh
2018
Afaak	Love Dreams	Larchmont Lad
2017
Here Comes When	Chelsea Lad	Victory Bond
2016
Always Smile	Convey	One Word More
2015
Alfred Hutchinson	You're Fired	Abseil
2014
Navajo Chief	Fort Bastion	Prince Of Johanne
2013
Navajo Chief	Prince Of Johanne	Anderiego
2012
Fury	Prince Of Johanne	Mijhaar
2011
St Moritz	Mont Agel	Dance And Dance

2010-2001
2010
Fareer	Rainbow Peak	Balcarce Nov
2009
Yamal	Philario	Mia's Boy
2008
Mia's Boy	Lang Shining	Blythe Knight
2007
Blythe Knight	Wise Dennis	Pride of Nation
2006
Zero Tolerance	Babodana	Dabbers Ridge
2005
Quito	Blue Spinnaker	Kings Point
2004
Autumn Glory	Duck Row	Mine
2003
Funfair	With Reason	Camp Commander
2002
Sea Star	Duck Row	Vintage Premium
2001
Soviet Flash	Tough Speed	Muchea

2000-1991
2000
Mayaro Bay	Caribbean Monarch	Free Option
1999
Sugarfoot	Stanott	Night Of Glass
1998
Ramooz	Gulf Shaadi	Showboat
1997
Centre Stalls	Prince Babar	Insatiable
1996
First Island	Green Green Desert	Clan Ben
1995
Jawaal	Kayvee	Pinkerton's Pal
1994
Soviet Line	Philidor	Young Ern
1993
Risk Master	Gymcrak Premiere	Efharisto
1992
Band On The Run	Sylva Honda	Dorset Duke
1991
Mellottie	Lord Of Tusmore	State Dancer

1990-1988
1990
Power Take Off	Nayland	Breezed Well
1989
True Panache	St Elmo's Fire	Army Of Stars
1988
Sharblask	Lady La Paz	Riot Squad

The Hambleton Stakes is a handicap flat horse race in Great Britain open to horses aged four years or older. It is run at York over a distance of 7 furlongs and 192 yards (1,584 metres), and it is scheduled to take place each year in May. Prior to 2018 it was run as a Listed handicap, but was downgraded by the British Horseracing Authority to comply with a new rule that no handicap race could carry Listed or Group race status.

== Winners ==
Year	Winner	Age	Weight	Jockey	Trainer	Time
1956	Aberlemno	4	7-00	Derek Morris	Harry Peacock	1:42.00
1957	Zip Goes A Million	6	7-06	Eddie Hide	Harry Maw	1:42.00
1958	Wharton Hill	4	7-07	Johnny Greenaway	Jimmy Thompson	1:44.80
1959	Scorton Arrow	4	7-07	Joe Sime	Sam Hall	1:41.00
1960	Who You	7	8-04	Eddie Hide	Ernest Carr	1:42.20
1961	Arion	4	9-02	Joe Sime	Sam Hall	1:40.20
1962	Dock Green	4	8-11	Harry Carr	Geoffrey Barling	1:41.60
1963	Indian Conquest	5	8-12	Norman Stirk	George Boyd	1:43.20
1964	Royal Unity	5	9-00	Lester Piggott	John Sutcliffe jr.	1:38.20
1965	King Charming	7	8-01	George Cadwaladr	Eric Cousins	1:41.20
1966	Metellus	5	8-08	Joe Sime	Sam Hall	1:46.00
1967	Venture Boy	5	6-12	Richard Dicey	John Sutcliffe jr.	Not taken
1968	Crosby Don	8	8-03	Johnny Greenaway	Jack Calvert	1:49.00
1969	Palmallet	5	7-09	Clive Eccleston	Frank Carr	1:51.80
1970	Coolmack	4	8-04	Johnny Seagrave	Herbert Jones	1:52.40
1971	Heirarch	4	7-07	Willie Carson	A Kerr	1:39.60
1972	Sovereign Eagle	4	7-07	Steve Perks	Reg Hollinshead	1:38.60
1973	Sovereign Eagle	5	7-06	Steve Perks	Reg Hollinshead	1:37.70
1974	Gloss	4	9-10	Pat Eddery	Atty Corbett	1:37.65
1975	Votecatcher	4	9-05	Tony Murray	Ryan Price	1:43.51
1976	Jumping Hill	4	9-05	Lester Piggott	Noel Murless	1:44.54
1977	Glorified	4	9-05	Bruce Raymond	James Bethell	1:45.92
1978	Sin Timon	4	8-12	Tony Kimberley	Jeremy Hindley	1:37.88
1979	Baronet	7	8-10	Brian Rouse	John Benstead	1:37.50
1980	House Guard	5	9-05	Lester Piggott	Robert Armstrong	1:36.82
1981	Baronet	9	9-00	Brian Rouse	John Benstead	1:43.49
1982	Tugoflove	6	8-00	Billy Newnes	Ray Laing	1:37.27
1983	Crossways	4	9-03	Pat Eddery	Geoff Wragg	1:43.20
1984	Teleprompter	4	9-09	Willie Carson	Bill Watts	1:36.02
1985	Portlaw	4	9-03	Pat Eddery	Jeremy Tree	1:41.51
1986	Esquire	4	8-13	Brent Thomson	Barry Hills	1:39.02
1987	Pasticcio	4	9-01	Bruce Raymond	Michael Jarvis	1:36.32
1988	Sharblask	4	9-03	Paul Cook	Nick Vigors	1:40.72
1989	True Panache	4	8-06	Pat Eddery	Jeremy Tree	1:36.14
1990	Power Take Off	4	8-11	Steve Cauthen	Peter Makin	1:37.35
1991	Mellottie	6	9-01	John Lowe	Mary Reveley	1:39.54
1992	Band On The Run	5	8-11	Richard Quinn	Bryan McMahon	1:35.98
1993	Risk Master	4	8-09	Richard Hills	Con Horgan	1:39.09
1994	Soviet Line	4	8-13	Walter Swinburn	Michael Stoute	1:35.13
1995	Jawaal	5	8-07	John Reid	Lady Herries	1:38.91
1996	First Island	4	9-07	Ray Cochrane	Geoff Wragg	1:36.40
1997	Centre Stalls	4	9-07	Richard Quinn	Fulke Johnson Houghton	1:39.01
1998	Ramooz	5	9-07	Pat Eddery	Ben Hanbury	1:39.04
1999	Sugarfoot	5	9-04	Michael Kinane	Nigel Tinkler	1:40.64
2000	Mayaro Bay	4	8-11	Richard Hughes	Richard Hannon Sr.	1:37.27
2001	Soviet Flash	4	9-00	Frankie Dettori	Ed Dunlop	1:37.13
2002	Sea Star	4	8-11	Richard Quinn	Henry Cecil	1:35.62
2003	Funfair	4	8-07	Kieren Fallon	Michael Stoute	1:36.44
2004	Autumn Glory	4	8-07	Steve Drowne	Geoff Wragg	1:40.75
2005	Quito	8	9-07	Tony Culhane	David Chapman	1:27.21
2006	Zero Tolerance	6	9-01	Jamie Spencer	David Barron	1:42.32
2007	Blythe Knight	7	8-09	Graham Gibbons	John Quinn	1:38.77
2008	Mia's Boy	4	8-07	Jimmy Quinn	Chris Dwyer	1:37.41
2009	Yamal	4	9-01	Frankie Dettori	Saeed bin Suroor	1:39.23
2010	Fareer	4	9-01	Richard Hills	Ed Dunlop	1:36.42
2011	St Moritz	5	9-02	Adrian Nicholls	David Nicholls	1:37.23
2012	Fury	4	9-04	Ryan Moore	William Haggas	1:39.27
2013	Navajo Chief	6	9-01	Michael Murphy	Alan Jarvis	1:39.64
2014	Navajo Chief	7	9-00	Kieren Fallon	Alan Jarvis	1:37.70
2015	Alfred Hutchinson	7	8-07	Barry McHugh	Geoff Oldroyd	1:36.96
2016	Always Smile	4	9-04	James Doyle	Saeed bin Suroor	1:36.34
2017	Here Comes When	7	9-01	Oisin Murphy	Andrew Balding	1:35.96
2018	Afaak	4	9-01	Jim Crowley	Charles Hills	1:36.84
2019	What's The Story	5	9-05	Joe Fanning	Keith Dalgleish	1:38.15
	no race 2020 (Note: The 2020 running was cancelled because of the COVID-19 pandemic in the United Kingdom)
2021	Kynren	7	9-02	Connor Beasley	David Barron	1:37.52
2022	Cruyff Turn	5	9-05	David Allan	Tim Easterby	1:36.71
2023	Croupier	4	9-05	William Buick	Simon & Ed Crisford	1:34.35
2024	Point Lynas	5	9-06	Callum Rodriguez	Edward Bethell	1:36.97
2025	Old Cock	4	8-13	Callum Rodriguez	Edward Bethell	1:39.08
2026	Maybe Not	4	8-03	Saffie Osborne	Ralph Beckett	1:37:20

== See also ==
- Horse racing in Great Britain
- List of British flat horse races
