= The Pizza Man =

American-bred Thoroughbred racehorse

- Sire: English Channel
- Grandsire: Smart Strike
- Dam: I Can Fan Fan
- Damsire: Lear Fan
- Sex: Gelding
- Foaled: 2009
- Country: United States
- Color: Bay
- Breeder: Midwest Thoroughbreds
- Owner: Midwest Thoroughbreds
- Trainer: Roger A. Brueggemann
- Record: 36: 17–3–3
- Earnings: $2,158,941

Major wins
- Tex's Zing Handicap (2012); Buck's Boy Handicap (2012); Illinois Owners Stakes (2013); Robert F. Carey Memorial Handicap (2013); Black Tie Affair Handicap (2014); Stars and Stripes Handicap (2014, 2015); Opening Verse Stakes (2015); Arlington Million (2015); Hollywood Turf Cup (2015); Northern Dancer Turf Stakes (2016)

The Pizza Man (foaled March 25, 2009) is an American Thoroughbred racehorse who won multiple stakes races including the Arlington Million in 2015 and the Northern Dancer Turf Stakes in 2016, becoming the first Illinois-bred horse to win either of these Grade I races. In 2015, The Pizza Man was named Illinois-bred Champion Turf Male, Champion Handicap Male, and Illinois Horse of the Year. He retired in 2017 as the all-time leading money earner among Illinois-breds.

== Background ==
The Pizza Man is a bay gelding who raced as a homebred for Midwest Thoroughbreds, the stable of Richard and Karen Papiese of Chicago. His dam I Can Fan Fan, a daughter of Lear Fan, was claimed by Papiese in 2005 for $18,000. The Pizza Man was her third foal. He was sired by English Channel, who won the Breeders' Cup Turf in 2007 and has since sired stakes winners on both dirt and turf, such as 2014 Travers Stakes winner V.E. Day and Heart to Heart.

The Pizza Man received the name because Papiese thought the blaze on his forehead resembled a pizza slice. He was trained by Roger Brueggemann, an Illinois native who had been training horses since the 1980s.

== Racing career ==
The Pizza Man finished eighth in his first and only start as a two-year-old, a six-furlong race on the dirt at Hawthorne Park on December 31, 2011.

The Pizza Man was switched to the turf course at Hawthorne for his first start as a three-year-old on April 13, 2012, and responded with a 3 3/4-length win. He followed up with two allowance race wins at Arlington Park in May and June. He then took a step up in class when he was entered in the Grade III American Derby in July, but finished sixth. He returned to the winner's circle in an allowance race at Arlington in August, then finished the year with wins in two Illinois-bred restricted stakes races, the Tex's Zing in September and the Buck Boy in October. In the Buck Boy, The Pizza Man won by 2 3/4 lengths in a "commanding performance". "I had a perfect trip," said jockey Florent Geroux. "It looked like there was going to be a lot of pace and it worked out that way. I just put my horse on the fence and tried to save as much ground as I could. When I swung him out, he just took off. He is just getting better and better." With a record of six wins from seven starts, The Pizza Man was named the 2012 Illinois-bred champion three-year-old.

The Pizza Man won his first start of 2013 in an allowance race at the Fair Grounds in March. He then experienced a three race losing streak that included a sixth-place finish in an allowance race at Churchill Downs, a second in the Black Tie Affair Handicap and a third in the Stars and Stripes Stakes. He rebounded in the fall to win the Illinois Owners Stakes and the Robert F. Carey Memorial Handicap, finishing the year with three wins from six starts.

=== 2014: five-year-old season ===
The Pizza Man started his five-year-old campaign on June 21, 2014, at Arlington in the Black Tie Affair Handicap. He raced in third place through the early portion of the race then closed ground to win by half a length. On July 12, he finally won his first graded stakes race, the 1 1/2-mile Stars and Stripes, in front-running fashion. "I had the best horse in the race, so I took the lead and went with it," said Geroux. "The plan was to get to wherever he was comfortable and he was comfortable on the lead."

The win gave The Pizza Man an automatic entry in the $400,000 American St. Leger in August. For the 1 11/16-mile marathon, he faced a strong field of horses from across not only North America but Europe as well, including the previous year's winner Dandino (GB) and the favorite, Eye of the Storm (IRE). The Pizza Man and Eye of the Storm raced just behind the early pace, then made their move entering the final turn. The Pizza Man drew away from Eye of the Storm then withstood a late run from Dandino to win by a length. "I had the perfect race," said Dandino's jockey Frankie Dettori. "Turning in I thought we would win, but (The Pizza Man) never stopped. He ran really hard to the line. He's coming back to form now."

The Pizza Man then shipped to Woodbine racetrack in Toronto to take on Grade I company for the first time in the Northern Dancer Turf Stakes. He stalked the pace, then started to make a run in the stretch but "evened out" and was passed by several late closers, finishing fifth. He then started in the Canadian International, also at Woodbine, held on October 19. He raced just off the pace and took the lead entering the stretch. He was passed by other horses in mid-stretch but continued to chase, finishing fourth. His final start of the year was in the Hollywood Turf Cup at Del Mar in late November, where he finished third.

=== 2015: six-year-old season ===
The Pizza Man was given a long layoff, spending much of the winter at his owner's Illinois farm. "I think we had a tired horse at the end of the year," said Papiese. The horse made his 2015 debut on May 30 in the Opening Verse Stakes at Churchill Downs, winning the 1 1/16-mile race by 2 1/2 lengths. On July 11, he returned to Arlington to defend his title in the Stars and Stripes as the 4–5 favorite. He raced behind a slow pace set by Roman Approval then made his move and hit the lead in mid-stretch. Roman Approval fought back and the two dueled to the wire, with The Pizza Man prevailing by a neck.

For his next start in August, Papiese chose to enter the gelding in the Grade I Arlington Million rather than attempt to defend his title in the American St. Leger. Papiese felt confident despite the world-class field in the Million. "He has never been better," he said. "I respect all of the people here — all the great owners and trainers and jockeys — and all of the horses we're running against, but I wouldn't trade places with anybody." On a soft turf course, The Pizza Man struggled in the early going but made a strong move down the stretch to win by a neck over Big Blue Kitten. "When I put him outside he started to hold up and grabbed the bit again," said Geroux. "I was thinking 'Oh boy, he's going for a big one here!' He is a local horse and even going to the track there was a lot of people cheering for us, and I'd like to thank them." The Pizza Man became the first Illinois-bred to win the Arlington Million.

On October 3, The Pizza Man was entered in the Shadwell Turf Mile at Keeneland. Racing at the back of the field in the early going, he closed "like a freight train" down the stretch and fell just short, finishing a head behind Grand Arch. "He couldn’t keep up early, so I let him settle," said Geroux. "When I asked him to run, it took him a little bit longer than usual because the race is shorter, but the last quarter of a mile he was flying."

The Pizza Man was next entered in the Breeders' Cup Turf on October 31, where he faced an outstanding field headed by Golden Horn, winner of the Derby and Prix de l'Arc de Triomphe, and Found, a three-year-old filly who had run second in the Irish Champion and Champion Stakes. The Pizza Man was no match for these two but finished a creditable fifth. "No excuse," said Geroux. "We were right behind Golden Horn all the way. I had the filly stuck on my inside. Turning for home he made a little run, but just got tired."

Papiese had planned to send the Pizza Man overseas to contest the Japan Cup but the gelding came down with a lung infection and would not have been able to recover in time. Instead, he traveled to Del Mar, California for the Hollywood Turf Cup on November 26. Ridden by new jockey Mike Smith, he won by two lengths as the heavy favorite. "Mike let him run his race, and when he gets to run his race, he's tough to beat," said Papiese. "Mike said he was going to be eight to 10 lengths off of it, and I said, 'You're going to love the afterburners when they kick in.'"

The Pizza Man finished the year with four wins and a second from six starts. The Illinois Thoroughbred Breeders and Owners Foundation honored him as the 2015 Illinois-bred Champion Turf Male, Champion Handicap Male, and Illinois Horse of the Year. He finished third in the Eclipse Award balloting for North American Champion Turf Male with 41 votes, behind Great Britain's Golden Horn and winner Big Blue Kitten.

=== 2016: seven-year-old season ===
The Pizza Man started his seven-year-old campaign with a fifth-place finish in the Gulfstream Park Handicap on February 6, 2016. "He really didn't like the Gulfstream turf at all,” said Brueggemann. "That was the first time I had him on something that he didn't like. We're hoping he can still compete as a year older but I know how I feel when I'm a year older." He then suffered three more losses in a row, placing fourth in the Wise Dan in June, fourth in the Stars and Stripes in July, and sixth in the Arlington Million.

On September 18, The Pizza Man traveled to Woodbine for his second appearance in the Northern Dancer Turf Stakes. With new jockey Flavien Prat, he raced in second on the outside of pacesetter World Approval, then fought his way to the lead. He then withstood a late rush by Wake Forest to win by a head, with World Approval a further head back in third. The win sent The Pizza Man's earnings over $2 million, and made him the first Illinois-bred horse to win the race. Papiese complimented Prat for adapting his tactics to the slow pace set by World Approval. "The game plan was to save ground and let him run in the stretch, but you go to 'Plan B' when 'Plan A' is pretty much out the window," he said.

The Pizza Man next entered the Canadian International at Woodbine on October 16, finishing fourth behind Irish-bred Erupt. He finished the year with a third-place finish in the River City Handicap.

=== 2017: eight-year-old season ===
The Pizza Man was given a long layoff, then returned on June 17, 2017, in the Black Tie Affair Handicap, finishing fourth. He next entered the Stars and Stripes Stakes for the fifth time, where he was made the favorite despite growing concerns that he had lost a step. The Pizza Man rated close behind a slow early pace then made his move in the final turn, hitting the lead in mid-stretch. Near the finish line though he was caught by Keystoneforvictory, who went on to win by 1 1/2 lengths. "He felt good", said Geroux. "Turning for home I thought I was going to get the win, but the one horse just ran him down the last eighth of a mile. He ran great, I think he's improved on his last race and I think he's moving in the right direction. He's a little bit older now and it might take him a bit longer to get to his top form."

== Retirement ==
After a twelfth-place finish in the 2017 Arlington Million, Papiese announced that The Pizza Man had been diagnosed with a chip in his left front ankle and would be retired. Papiese told The Blood-Horse that The Pizza Man was "fine, but to go through the rehab and everything with a horse who is already 8, that would be crazy. We'll let him heal up." The Pizza Man was sent to Florida to recover from his injury, then started training for a second career as a track pony.

On September 16, 2017, The Pizza Man was honored with a retirement ceremony at Arlington Park.

Around June 2018, The Pizza Man returned to the backstretch at Arlington and the barn of Roger Brueggemann, where he was used as a stable pony during training hours.

In 2020, The Pizza Man was retired to Old Friends in Georgetown, Kentucky.

== Pedigree ==
Pedigree of The Pizza Man, bay gelding, 2009
Sire English Channel 2002	Smart Strike; 1992	Mr. Prospector	Raise a Native
Sire English Channel 2002	Smart Strike; 1992	Mr. Prospector	Gold Digger
Sire English Channel 2002	Smart Strike; 1992	Classy 'n Smart	Smarten
Sire English Channel 2002	Smart Strike; 1992	Classy 'n Smart	No Class
Sire English Channel 2002	Belva; 1998	Theatrical (IRE)	Nureyev
Sire English Channel 2002	Belva; 1998	Theatrical (IRE)	Tree of Knowledge (IRE)
Sire English Channel 2002	Belva; 1998	Committed	Hagley
Sire English Channel 2002	Belva; 1998	Committed	Minstinguette
Dam I Can Fan Fan 1999	Lear Fan; 1981	Roberto	Hail to Reason
Dam I Can Fan Fan 1999	Lear Fan; 1981	Roberto	Bramalea
Dam I Can Fan Fan 1999	Lear Fan; 1981	Wac	Lt. Stevens
Dam I Can Fan Fan 1999	Lear Fan; 1981	Wac	Belthazar
Dam I Can Fan Fan 1999	Flower Circle; 1990	Lieutenant's Lark	Lt. Stevens
Dam I Can Fan Fan 1999	Flower Circle; 1990	Lieutenant's Lark	Hunt's Lark
Dam I Can Fan Fan 1999	Flower Circle; 1990	Social Circle	Circle
Dam I Can Fan Fan 1999	Flower Circle; 1990	Social Circle	Shady Tune (family: 20-a)

The Pizza Man's dam, I Can Fan Fan, is inbred 3 × 3 to Lt. Stevens, meaning Lt. Stevens appears twice in the third generation of her pedigree.
