= Forbidden Apple =

American thoroughbred racehorse (1995–2025)

- Sire: Pleasant Colony
- Grandsire: His Majesty
- Dam: North of Eden
- Damsire: Northfields
- Sex: Stallion
- Foaled: May 31, 1995
- Died: June 16, 2025 (aged 30)
- Country: United States
- Color: Dark Bay/Brown
- Breeder: Arthur I. Appleton
- Owner: Arthur I. Appleton
- Trainer: Christophe Clement
- Record: 31: 8-6-9
- Earnings: $1,680,640

Major wins
- Belmont Breeder's Cup Handicap (2000); Kelso Handicap (2000, 2001); Manhattan Handicap (2001)

Awards
- 2001 Florida Horse of the Year

Honors
- Forbidden Apple Stakes (2014–2022) at Saratoga Racecourse
- Last updated on July 16, 2023

Forbidden Apple (May 31, 1995 – June 16, 2025) was an American Thoroughbred racehorse and the winner of the 2001 Manhattan Handicap.

== Career ==
Forbidden Apple's first race was on July 24, 1998, at Belmont Park, where he came in seventh. The colt's first win came on September 13, 1998, in a Maiden Special Weight race at Belmont Park. On the same track, he then won an Allowance event on October 25, 1998.

It would not be until September 16, 2000, that Forbidden Apple won his first graded stakes race, when he took the mile and one-eighth Belmont Breeder's Cup Handicap. He then picked up another graded win in the one mile Kelso Handicap on October 8, 2000.

Forbidden Apple earned the biggest win of his career when he won the June 9, 2001, Manhattan Handicap at Belmont Park. He then got what turned out to be his last win on October 6, 2001, with a victory in Belmont's Kelso Handicap for the second time.

On June 8, 2002, Forbidden Apple attempted to defend his Manhattan Handicap title but finished second to Beat Hollow. He placed multiple times in 2002, coming close in the Bernard Baruch Handicap, Arlington Million, Kelso Handicap and the Breeders' Cup Mile won by Val Royal.

Forbidden Apple finished his career on January 25, 2003, with a third-place finish in the 2003 Barretts/CTBA Turf Stakes.

== Death ==
Forbidden Apple was euthanised on June 16, 2025, at the age of 30.

== Honors ==
In 2014, the New York Racing Association (NYRA) inaugurated a one-mile stakes race on turf at Belmont Park in Forbidden Apple's honor. Open to horses age four and older, the event's first winner was the colt Sayaad, owned by the Shadwell Stable. In 2019, the Forbidden Apple Stakes was given Grade 3 status and transferred to Saratoga Racecourse. In 2023, the event was renamed to the Kelso Stakes.

== Pedigree ==
Pedigree of Forbidden Apple (USA), 2015
Sire Pleasant Colony (USA) 1978	His Majesty (USA); 1968	Ribot	Tenerani
Sire Pleasant Colony (USA) 1978	His Majesty (USA); 1968	Ribot	Romanella
Sire Pleasant Colony (USA) 1978	His Majesty (USA); 1968	Flower Bowl	Alibhai
Sire Pleasant Colony (USA) 1978	His Majesty (USA); 1968	Flower Bowl	Flower Bed
Sire Pleasant Colony (USA) 1978	Sun Colony (USA); 1968	Sunrise Flight	Double Jay
Sire Pleasant Colony (USA) 1978	Sun Colony (USA); 1968	Sunrise Flight	Misty Morn
Sire Pleasant Colony (USA) 1978	Sun Colony (USA); 1968	Colonia	Cockrullah
Sire Pleasant Colony (USA) 1978	Sun Colony (USA); 1968	Colonia	Nalga
Dam North of Eden (IRE) 1983	Northfields (USA); 1968	Northern Dancer	Nearctic
Dam North of Eden (IRE) 1983	Northfields (USA); 1968	Northern Dancer	Natalma
Dam North of Eden (IRE) 1983	Northfields (USA); 1968	Little Hut	Occupy
Dam North of Eden (IRE) 1983	Northfields (USA); 1968	Little Hut	Savage Beauty
Dam North of Eden (IRE) 1983	Tree of Knowledge (IRE); 1977	Sassafras	Sheshoon
Dam North of Eden (IRE) 1983	Tree of Knowledge (IRE); 1977	Sassafras	Ruta
Dam North of Eden (IRE) 1983	Tree of Knowledge (IRE); 1977	Sensibility	Hail to Reason
Dam North of Eden (IRE) 1983	Tree of Knowledge (IRE); 1977	Sensibility	Pange
