= Elusive Quality Stakes =

- Class: Listed
- Location: Belmont Park; Elmont, New York, United States
- Inaugurated: 2014
- Race type: Thoroughbred - Flat racing
- Website: www.nyra.com/belmont/

Race information
- Distance: 7 furlongs
- Surface: Dirt
- Track: left-handed
- Qualification: Four-year-olds and up
- Weight: Assigned
- Purse: US$100,000

The Elusive Quality Stakes is an American Thoroughbred horse race over seven furlongs for older horses at Belmont Park racetrack in Elmont, New York. The race was named after Elusive Quality. The race was first ran in 2014. There was no running in 2020.

== Records ==
Most wins by a jockey:

- 2-Javier Castellano (2014,2022)

Most wins by a trainer:

- 2-Christophe Clement (2017,2019)
- 2-Chad C. Brown (2014, 2016)

Most wins by an owner

All owners have one win

== Winners ==
Year	Horse	Age	Jockey	Trainer	Owner	Distance	Time
2022	Scuttlebuzz	5	Javier Castellano	Rudy R. Rodriguez	La Marca Stables	7 Furlongs	1:21.45
2021	Casa Creed	5	Joe Bravo	William I. Mott	LRE Racing & JEH Racing Stable	7 Furlongs	1:22.65
2020	Race Not Held						
2019	Therapist	4	Eric Cancel	Christophe Clement	Oak Bluff Stables	7 Furlongs	1:24.75
2018	Blind Ambition	4	John R. Velazquez	Todd Pletcher	Gainesway Farm	7 Furlongs	1:20.65
2017	Disco Partner	6	Irad Ortiz Jr.	Christophe Clement	Patricia A. Generazio	7 Furlongs	1:22.61
2016	A Lot	5	Irad Ortiz Jr.	Chad C. Brown	American Racing LLC	7 Furlongs	1:19.23
2015	Mosler	5	Joel Rosario	William I. Mott	Adele B. Dilschneider	7 Furlongs	1:20.63
2014	Integrity	4	Javier Castellano	Chad C. Brown	Robert V. LaPenta	7 Furlongs	1:22.90
