= Fourstardave Stakes =

- Class: Grade I
- Location: Saratoga Race Course; Saratoga Springs, New York, United States
- Inaugurated: 1985 (as Daryl's Joy Stakes)
- Race type: Thoroughbred – Flat racing
- Website: NYRA

Race information
- Distance: 1 mile (8 furlongs)
- Surface: Turf
- Track: Left-handed
- Qualification: Three-year-olds and older
- Weight: 126 lbs. with allowances
- Purse: US$750,000 (2025)
- Bonuses: Breeders' Cup Challenge "Win and You're In"

The Fourstardave Stakes is a Grade I American Thoroughbred horse race for horses that are three years old or older over a distance of one mile on the turf course scheduled annually in August at Saratoga Race Course in Saratoga Springs, New York. The event currently carries a purse of $750,000.

== History ==
The event was inaugurated on 31 July 1985, Opening Day of the Saratoga meeting for that year as the Daryl's Joy Stakes at a distance of 1 1/16 miles and was won by Roving Minstrel who was ridden by United States' Racing Hall of Fame jockey Ángel Cordero Jr. in a time of 1:45 2/5. The New Zealand-bred Daryl's Joy was a Two Year Champion in 1968 there, and after a successful spring campaign in Australia in 1969 winning the W. S. Cox Plate and Victoria Derby the colt was sold to the US where he won six races in eleven starts for United States' Racing Hall of Fame trainer Charles E. Whittingham.

Early winners of the event won even more important events and the status of the race grew in importance. In 1988 the event was classified as Grade III. The winner of the First Division of the split divisions in 1989, the British bred horse Steinlen later that year would win the Breeders' Cup Mile. In 1990 and 1991, the New York State bred Fourstardave won the race.

In 1995 New York Racing Association renamed the event to The Fourstardave, nicknamed "The Sultan of Saratoga" because he won at least one race at the Saratoga track each year from 1987 to 1994. Fourstardave died of a heart attack in October 2002 at the age of 17 and is buried in Clare Court at Saratoga Race Course. This is a rare honor since only three horses are buried there.

In 2012 the distance of the event was decreased from 1 1/16 miles to one mile.

The event was upgraded to Grade II in 2000 and achieving Grade I status in 2016.

The race was moved off the turf to dirt in 1992 and 2002 due to weather conditions. In 2002 the grade of the event was lowered due to the change of surface as designated by the Thoroughbred Owners and Breeders Association.

In the 2014 renewal, Seek Again set a Saratoga course record in the event which was broken again in 2019 by the mare Got Stormy, who is the only mare to have won the race. In 2021 Got Stormy won the event again at odds of 12–1.

Several horses who have won this event became celebrated champions. The 1993 winner Lure went on to win the Breeders' Cup Mile later in the year also the 1996 winner Da Hoss went on to win the Breeders' Cup Mile later. Both horses were two-time winners of the Breeders' Cup Mile. The 2005 Brazilian bred winner Leroidesanimaux would become US Champion Male Turf Horse. Dual winner Wise Dan would become US Horse of the Year in both 2012 and 2013 the years he won the event. The last horse to win the event and the Breeders' Cup Mile was the champion World Approval in 2017.

The event was run with handicap conditions between 1998 and 2024. In 2025 the event reverted to stakes conditions with allowances.

== Records ==
Speed record:

- 1 mile: Got Stormy (2019) – 1:32.00
- 1 1/16 miles: Fourstardave (1991) – 1:38.80

Most wins:

- 2 – Fourstardave (1990, 1991)
- 2 – Wise Dan (2012, 2013)
- 2 – Got Stormy (2019, 2021)
- 2 – Casa Creed (2022, 2023)

Most wins by a jockey:

- 9 – John R. Velazquez (1992, 1996, 2001, 2004, 2005, 2008, 2011, 2012, 2013)

Most wins by a trainer:

- 6 – William I. Mott (2000, 2007, 2014, 2016, 2022, 2023)

Most wins by an owner:

- 2 – Fernwood Sable (1986, 1987)
- 2 – Frances A. Genter (1987, 1988)
- 2 – Richard Bomze & Bernard Connaughton (1990, 1991)
- 2 – Juddmonte Farms (1992, 2014)
- 2 – Darley Stable (2003, 2009)
- 2 – WinStar Farm (2011, 2016)
- 2 – Morton Fink (2012, 2013)
- 2 – LRE Racing, LLC and JEH Racing, LLC (2022, 2023)
- 2 – St. Elias Stable, Ken Langone, Steven C. Duncker & Vicarage Stable (2025, 2026)

== Winners ==
Year	Winner	Age	Jockey	Trainer	Owner	Distance	Time	Purse	Grade	Ref
Fourstardave Stakes
2026	Deterministic	5	Kendrick Carmouche	Miguel Clement	St. Elias Stable, Ken Langone, Steven C. Duncker & Vicarage Stable	1 mile	1:35.07	$750,000	I	
2025	Deterministic	4	Kendrick Carmouche	Miguel Clement	St. Elias Stable, Ken Langone, Steven C. Duncker & Vicarage Stable	1 mile	1:33.87	$750,000	I	
Fourstardave Handicap
2024	Carl Spackler (IRE)	4	Tyler Gaffalione	Chad C. Brown	e Five Racing Thoroughbreds	1 mile	1:36.63	$500,000	I	
2023	Casa Creed	7	Luis Saez	William I. Mott	LRE Racing & JEH Racing Stable	1 mile	1:34.20	$500,000	I	
2022	Casa Creed	6	Luis Saez	William I. Mott	LRE Racing & JEH Racing Stable	1 mile	1:34.20	$500,000	I	
2021	ƒ Got Stormy	6	Tyler Gaffalione	Mark E. Casse	Spendthrift Farm & My Racehorse Stable	1 mile	1:33.09	$500,000	I	
2020	Halladay	4	Luis Saez	Todd Pletcher	Harrell Ventures	1 mile	1:33.32	$400,000	I	
2019	ƒ Got Stormy	4	Ricardo Santana Jr.	Mark E. Casse	Gary Barber & Southern Equine Stable	1 mile	1:32.00	$500,000	I	
2018	Voodoo Song	4	Jose Lezcano	Linda L. Rice	Barry K. Schwartz	1 mile	1:35.96	$513,750	I	
2017	World Approval	5	Manuel Franco	Mark E. Casse	Live Oak Racing	1 mile	1:37.65	$500,000	I	
2016	Tourist	5	Joel Rosario	William I. Mott	WinStar Farm, Wachtel Stable, Gary Barber	1 mile	1:34.29	$500,000	I	
2015	Grand Arch	6	Luis Saez	Brian A. Lynch	Jim & Susan Hill	1 mile	1:34.65	$500,000	II	
2014	Seek Again	4	Joel Rosario	William I. Mott	Juddmonte Farms	1 mile	1:33.25	$500,000	II	
2013	Wise Dan	6	John R. Velazquez	Charles LoPresti	Morton Fink	1 mile	1:34.00	$500,000	II	
2012	Wise Dan	5	John R. Velazquez	Charles LoPresti	Morton Fink	1 mile	1:37.30	$500,000	II	
2011	Sidney's Candy	4	John R. Velazquez	Todd A. Pletcher	WinStar Farm & Rubio B. Stable	1 1/16 miles	1:43.25	$150,000	II	
2010	Get Stormy	4	Javier Castellano	Thomas M. Bush	Sullimar Stable	1 1/16 miles	1:39.09	$150,000	II	
2009	Justenuffhumor	4	Alan Garcia	Kiaran P. McLaughlin	Darley Stable	1 1/16 miles	1:42.83	$158,750	II	
2008	Red Giant	4	John R. Velazquez	Todd A. Pletcher	Peachtree Stable	1 1/16 miles	1:41.93	$150,000	II	
2007	Silver Tree	7	Kent J. Desormeaux	William I. Mott	Peter Vegso	1 1/16 miles	1:41.88	$150,000	II	
2006	Remarkable News (VEN)	4	Javier Castellano	Angel A. Penna Jr.	Holly Rincon	1 1/16 miles	1:40.81	$147,000	II	
2005	Leroidesanimaux (BRZ)	5	John R. Velazquez	Robert J. Frankel	Stud TNT	1 1/16 miles	1:39.92	$200,000	II	
2004	Nothing to Lose	4	John R. Velazquez	Robert J. Frankel	Kenneth & Sarah Ramsey	1 1/16 miles	1:39.50	$200,000	II	
2003	Trademark (SAF)	7	Richard Migliore	Kiaran P. McLaughlin	Darley Stable	1 1/16 miles	1:39.29	$200,000	II	
2002	Capsized	6	José A. Santos	Lisa L. Lewis	Gold Spur Stable & Stonerside Stable	1 1/8 miles	1:50.90	$200,000	III	Off turf
2001	Dr. Kashnikow	4	John R. Velazquez	John C. Kimmel	Erdenheim Farm	1 1/16 miles	1:39.30	$200,000	II	
2000	Hap	4	Jerry D. Bailey	William I. Mott	Edward White & Michael Paulson	1 1/16 miles	1:40.24	$200,000	II	
1999	Comic Strip	4	Pat Day	Neil J. Howard	William S. Farish III, G. Watts Humphrey Jr. & James Elkins	1 1/16 miles	1:41.76	$150,000	III	
1998	Wild Event	5	Mark Guidry	Louis M. Goldfine	Arthur I. Appleton	1 1/16 miles	1:39.25	$114,900	III	
Fourstardave Stakes
1997	Soviet Line (IRE)	7	Pat Day	Kiaran P. McLaughlin	Shiek Maktoum bin Rashid Al Maktoum	1 1/16 miles	1:39.99	$112,500	III	
1996	Da Hoss	4	John R. Velazquez	Michael W. Dickinson	Prestonwood Farm	1 1/16 miles	1:40.54	$118,500	III	
Daryl's Joy Stakes
1995	Pride of Summer	7	Eddie Maple	Anthony J. Bizelia	TOC Stable, et al.	1 1/16 miles	1:40.85	$115,400	III	
Daryl's Joy Handicap
1994	§ A in Sociology	4	Jean-Luc Samyn	Philip G. Johnson	Barbara Ronca	1 1/16 miles	1:41.23	$115,400	III	
Daryl's Joy Stakes
1993	Lure	4	Mike E. Smith	Claude R. McGaughey III	Claiborne Farm	1 1/16 miles	1:40.84	$120,200	III	
1992	Now Listen	5	John R. Velazquez	Robert J. Frankel	Juddmonte Farms	1 mile	1:36.64	$119,400	III	Off turf
1991	Fourstardave	6	Mike E. Smith	Leo O'Brien	Richard Bomze & Bernard Connaughton	1 1/16 miles	1:38.80	$119,400	III	
1990	Fourstardave	5	Mike E. Smith	Leo O'Brien	Richard Bomze & Bernard Connaughton	1 1/16 miles	1:41.20	$95,250	III	
1989	Steinlen (GB)	5	Ángel Cordero Jr.	D. Wayne Lukas	George E. Rowand	1 1/16 miles	1:41.00	$89,925	III	Division 1
1989	Highland Springs	6	Edgar S. Prado	Barclay Tagg	Wildenstein Stable	1 1/16 miles	1:41.60	$89,925	III	Division 2
1988	San's the Shadow	4	Ángel Cordero Jr.	Timothy A. Hills	Frances A. Genter	1 1/16 miles	1:40.00	$93,900	III	
1987	Persian Mews (IRE)	4	José A. Santos	Thomas J. Skiffington	Fernwood Stable	1 1/16 miles	1:42.00	$85,200		Division 1
1987	Duluth	5	Jean Cruguet	Flint S. Schulhofer	Frances A. Genter	1 1/16 miles	1:42.80	$85,200		Division 2
1986	Mourjane (IRE)	6	José A. Santos	Thomas J. Skiffington	Fernwood Stable	1 1/16 miles	1:42.80	$56,600		
1985	Roving Minstrel	4	Ángel Cordero Jr.	Larry A. Kelly	Craig F. Cullinan Jr.	1 1/16 miles	1:45.40	$56,100		

Legend:
Dirt Turf
Notes:
§ Ran as an entry
ƒ Filly or Mare

== See also ==
- List of American and Canadian Graded races
