= Supreme Stakes =

Flat horse race in Britain

- Location: Goodwood Racecourse; W. Sussex, England
- Inaugurated: 1981
- Race type: Flat
- Sponsor: Weatherbys
- Website: Goodwood

Race information
- Distance: 7f (1,408 metres)
- Surface: Turf
- Track: Right-handed
- Qualification: Three-years-old and up
- Weight: 9 st 0 lb (3yo); 9 st 5 lb (4yo+); Allowances; 3 lb for fillies and mares Penalties; 7 lb for Group 1 winners * 5 lb for Group 2 winners * 3 lb for Group 3 winners * * after 2021
- Purse: £80,000 (2022); 1st: £45,368

Supreme Stakes
2022
Double Or Bubble	Misty Grey	Happy Power

Previous years
2021
Toro Strike	Double Or Bubble	Rhoscolyn

2020-2011
2020
Happy Power	Toro Strike	Escobar
2019
Suedois	Momkin	Larchmont Lad
2018
Anna Nerium	Dream Of Dreams	Cardsharp
2017
Dutch Connection	Salateen	Viscount Barfield
2016
Opal Tiara	Convey	Jallota
2015
So Beloved	Here Comes When	Emell
2014
Ansgar	Muteela	Professor
2013
Lockwood	Boom And Bust	Professor
2012
Producer	The Cheka	Zumbi
2011
Libranno	Jacqueline Quest	High Standing

2010-2001
2010
Tropical Paradise	First City	Himalaya
2009
Ordnance Row	Asset	Cat Junior
2008
Express Wish	Welsh Emperor	Beaver Patrol
2007
Lovelace	Dunelight	Bygone Days
2006
Stronghold	Byron	King Jock
2005
Arakan	Sabbeeh	New Seeker
2004
Mac Love	Vanderlin	Polar Way
2003
With Reason	Monsieur Bond	Tantina
2002
Firebreak	Patsy's Double	Royal Millennium
2001
Late Night Out	Free Rider	Zilch

2000-1991
2000
Mount Abu	One Won One	Last Resort
1998
Decorated Hero	Beraysim	Bold Fact
1997
Decorated Hero	Restructure	Nwaamis
1996
Tagula	Wizard King	Thrilling Day
1995
Inzar	Mutakddim	Myself
1994
Soviet Line	Alanees	Arjuzah
1992
Hazaam	Prince Ferdinand	Swing Low
1991
Osario	Susurration	Norton Challenger

1990-1988
1990
Anshan	Palace Street	Enharmonic
1989
Kerita	Mirror Black	Markofdistinction
1988
Fair Judgment	Alquoz	Luzum

The Supreme Stakes is a flat horse race in Great Britain open to horses aged three years or older. It is run at Goodwood over a distance of 7 furlongs (1,408 metres), and it is scheduled to take place each year in late August or early September.

== History ==
The event was established in 1981, and was originally a Listed race called the Harroways Stakes. It was named after the Harroways, an area of the Goodwood Estate where the racecourse was founded. It was upgraded to Group 3 and given its present title in 1987. The race lost its Group 3 status when it was removed from the Pattern and Listed race programme in 2023.

The Supreme Stakes was formerly held in late September or early October. It was brought forward to an earlier date in 2007.

== Records ==
Most successful horse (2 wins):

- Sarab – 1984, 1986
- Decorated Hero – 1997, 1998

Leading jockey (3 wins):

- Richard Quinn – Sarab (1984, 1986), Inzar (1995)
- Frankie Dettori – Decorated Hero (1998), Firebreak (2002), With Reason (2003)
- Richard Hughes - Stronghold (2006), Libranno (2011), Producer (2012)

Leading trainer (5 wins):

- John Gosden – Anshan (1990), Decorated Hero (1997, 1998), Mount Abu (2000), Stronghold (2006)

== Winners ==
Year	Winner	Age	Jockey	Trainer	Time
1981	Belmont Bay	4	Lester Piggott	Henry Cecil	1:31.74
1982	Hays	3	Greville Starkey	Guy Harwood	1:32.79
1983	Larionov	3	Brian Taylor	John Winter	1:29.18
1984	Sarab	3	Richard Quinn	Paul Cole	1:29.78
1985	Efisio	3	Willie Carson	John Dunlop	1:27.63
1986	Sarab	5	Richard Quinn	Paul Cole	1:27.72
1987	Asteroid Field	4	Michael Hills	Barry Hills	1:27.72
1988	Fair Judgment	4	John Reid	Vincent O'Brien	1:29.62
1989	Kerita	3	Pat Eddery	Fulke Johnson Houghton	1:30.24
1990	Anshan	3	Pat Eddery	John Gosden	1:30.70
1991	Osario	4	Michael Roberts	Richard Hannon Sr.	1:28.25
1992	Hazaam	3	Walter Swinburn	Michael Stoute	1:30.94
1993	Abandoned due to waterlogging
1994	Soviet Line	4	Walter Swinburn	Michael Stoute	1:25.72
1995	Inzar	3	Richard Quinn	Paul Cole	1:28.77
1996	Tagula	3	Kevin Darley	Ian Balding	1:27.17
1997	Decorated Hero	5	Olivier Peslier	John Gosden	1:24.64
1998	Decorated Hero	6	Frankie Dettori	John Gosden	1:24.51
1999	Abandoned due to waterlogging
2000	Mount Abu	3	Jimmy Fortune	John Gosden	1:32.53
2001	Late Night Out	6	Michael Tebbutt	William Jarvis	1:29.33
2002	Firebreak	3	Frankie Dettori	Saeed bin Suroor	1:24.36
2003	With Reason	5	Frankie Dettori	David Loder	1:25.52
2004	Mac Love	3	Gary Carter	Jon Akehurst	1:28.19
2005	Arakan	5	Kieren Fallon	Sir Michael Stoute	1:28.30
2006	Stronghold	4	Richard Hughes	John Gosden	1:27.22
2007	Lovelace	3	Jamie Spencer	Mark Johnston	1:25.11
2008	Express Wish	4	Shane Kelly	Jeremy Noseda	1:32.75
2009	Ordnance Row	6	Ryan Moore	Richard Hannon Sr.	1:26.09
2010	Tropical Paradise	4	Ian Mongan	Peter Winkworth	1:28.34
2011	Libranno	3	Richard Hughes	Richard Hannon Sr.	1:28.01
2012	Producer	3	Richard Hughes	Richard Hannon Sr.	1:27.75
2013	Lockwood	4	Silvestre de Sousa	Saeed bin Suroor	1:24.19
2014	Ansgar	6	James Doyle	Sabrina Harty	1:26.20
2015	So Beloved	5	Danny Tudhope	David O'Meara	1:28.61
2016	Opal Tiara	3	Oisin Murphy	Mick Channon	1:26.24
2017	Dutch Connection	5	Jim Crowley	Charles Hills	1:24.21
2018	Anna Nerium	3	Tom Marquand	Richard Hannon Jr.	1:33.60
2019	Suedois	8	Daniel Tudhope	David O'Meara	1:24.99
2020	Happy Power	4	Silvestre De Sousa	Andrew Balding	1:29.69
2021	Toro Strike	4	Ryan Moore	Richard Fahey	1:23.62
2022	Double Or Bubble	5	Jack Mitchell	Chris Wall	1:27.66

== See also ==
- Horse racing in Great Britain
- List of British flat horse races
- Recurring sporting events established in 1981 – this race is included under its original title, Harroways Stakes.
