= Jimmy Winkfield Stakes =

- Class: Black Type
- Location: Aqueduct Racetrack; South Ozone Park, Queens, New York; United States
- Inaugurated: 1985
- Race type: Thoroughbred - Flat racing
- Website: www.nyra.com/aqueduct/

Race information
- Distance: 7 furlongs
- Surface: Dirt
- Track: left-handed
- Qualification: Three years old
- Purse: $100,000

The Jimmy Winkfield Stakes is an American Thoroughbred horse race run at Aqueduct Racetrack on Long Island, New York at the beginning of each year. The event is for three-year-olds and currently set at a distance of seven furlongs on the dirt.

The Jimmy Winkfield Stakes is named for U.S. Racing Hall of Fame inductee James Winkfield, the last African American jockey to win the Kentucky Derby. He won it twice: with His Eminence in 1901 and with Alan-a-Dale in 1902.

This race was formerly known as the Best Turn from 1985 to 2004.

== Records ==
Speed record:

- 1:25.24 @ 7 furlongs: Haikal (2019)
- 1:08.33 @ 6 furlongs: Fort Hughes (2011)

Most wins by a jockey:

- 4 - Richard Migliore (1985, 1993, 1996, 2004)

Most wins by a trainer:

- 3 - D. Wayne Lukas (1988, 1889, 1891)
- 3 - Kiaran McLaughlin (2009, 2011, 2019)

Most wins by an owner:

- 2 - Hobeau Farm (1994, 2001)
- 2 - Shadwell Stable (2009, 2019)

== Winners ==
Year	Winner	Jockey	Trainer	Owner	Dist. (Miles)	Time	Win$
2025	T Kraft	Jose Lezcano	William I. Mott	LRE Racing LLC	6 F	1:12.32	$125,000
2024	Bergen	Manuel Franco	Brad H. Cox	Spendthrift Farm, Martin Schwartz, Gandharvi LLC, Big Easy Racing LLC, Rick Kanter, James J. Bakke, Titletown Racing, Kueber Racing, Golconda Stable, Ali Goodrich & Mark Parkinson	6 F	1:12.63	$100,000
2023	Drew's Gold	Jose Antonio Gomez	James K. Chapman	James K. Chapman & Stuart Tsujimoto	6 F	1:13.09	$100,000
2022	Morello	Jose Lezcano	Steven M. Asmussen	Blue Lion Thoroughbreds	7 F	1:23.30	$100,000
2021	Hello Hot Rod	Trevor McCarthy	Brittany Russell	Brittany T. Russell, & Dark Horse Racing	7 F	1:26.30	$100,000
2020	Montauk Traffic	Jose Lezcano	Linda Rice	Chris Fountoukis	7 F	1:25.64	$94,000
2019	Haikal	Rajiv Maragh	Kiaran McLaughlin	Shadwell Stable	7 F	1:25.24	$90,000
2018	A Different Style	Kendrick Carmouche	John C. Servis	Fletcher & Carolyn Gray	7 F	1:26.07	$90,000
2017	Caledonian	Eric Cancel	John Terranova	Curragh Stables (Robert & Michael Devlin)	6 F	1:12.19	$60,000
2016	Awesome Gent	Manuel Franco	Todd Pletcher	Burning Sands Stable LLC	6 F	1:10:60	$75,000
2015	Ackeret	Jose Ortiz	Gustavo Rodriguez	Pick Six Racing (David Wilkenfeld) & Silver Streak Stables	6 F	1:11.13	$60,000
2014	Hot Heir Skier	Jose Ortiz	Benjamin W. Perkins Jr.	New Farm (Everett Novak)	6 F	1:11.25	$60,000
2013	Clawback	Irad Ortiz Jr.	Richard A. Violette Jr.	Klaravich Stables, Inc. & William H. Lawrence	6 F	1:09.75	$45,000
2012	King and Crusader	Cornelio Velásquez	Richard E. Dutrow Jr.	James A. Riccio	6 F	1:11.72	$45,000
2011	Fort Hughes	Eddie Castro	Kiaran McLaughlin	Darley Stable	6 F	1:08.33	$39,000
2010	Deputy Daney	Angel Arroyo	Cathal A. Lynch	Matthew Hand	6 F	1:11.83	$39,000
2009	Taqarub	Alan Garcia	Kiaran McLaughlin	Shadwell Stable	6 F	1:09.26	$42,027
2008	Go Go Shoot	Alan Garcia	James Ryerson	Robert E. Hurley	6 F	1:11.18	$49,035
2007	Bill Place	Ramon Domínguez	Anthony W. Dutrow	Dubb, Goldfarb, et al.	6 F	1:10.44	$41,388
2006	Strummer	Norberto Arroyo Jr.	Thomas M. Bush	Edward C. Behringer & Thomas Murray	6 F	1:11.04	$42,081
2005	Maddy's Lion	Pablo Fragoso	John Pregman Jr.	Dennis J. Federico	6 F	1:11.40	$48,240
2004	Redskin Warrior	Richard Migliore	Jennifer Pedersen	Paraneck Stable	6 F	1:09.80	$49,095
2003	Second in Command	Jean-Luc Samyn	Linda L. Rice	Richard L. Golden	6 F	1:10.60	$49,680
2002	Smooth Jazz	Mario Pino	Anthony W. Dutrow	Anthony W. Dutrow	6 F	1:10.60	$49,770
2001	Put It Back	Noel A. Wynter	James A. Jerkens	Hobeau Farm	6 F	1:09.00	$48,585
2000	Max's Pal	Dale V. Beckner	Benjamin W. Perkins Jr.	Raymond Dweck	6 F	1:10.60	$49,425
1999	Badge	Shaun Bridgmohan	Joseph Aquilino	Southbelle Stable (James Vena)	6 F	1:10.20	$39,420
1998	Spicy Award	Aaron Gryder	Robert A. Barbara	Sabine Stable (Joseph & Winnie Greeley)	6 F	1:10.40	$39,852
1997	American Champ	Anthony Black	Robert W. Camac	Arthur I. Appleton	6 F	1:10.40	$39,988
1996	Romano Gucci	Richard Migliore	Richard E. Dutrow Sr.	Herbert Kushner	6 F	1:10.20	$48,480
1995	Da Hoss	Mike Luzzi	Michael W. Dickinson	Prestonwood Farm	6 F	1:11.20	$50,040
1994	Rizzi	Jean-Luc Samyn	H. Allen Jerkens	Hobeau Farm	6 F	1:09.20	$48,765
1993	Farmonthefreeway	Richard Migliore	Richard O'Connell	Very Un Stable (Joseph Gioia)	6 F	1:08.80	$53,280
1992	Belong To Me	David Lidberg	H. Allen Jerkens	Middletown Stable (Joseph & William Stavola)	6 F	1:09.20	$51,930
1991	Dodge	Chris Antley	D. Wayne Lukas	William T. Young	6 F	1:09.40	$52,560
1990	For Really	Chris Antley	Richard E. Dutrow Sr.	Regal Oak Farm (Donald M. Wolfson)	6 F	1:10.60	$52,110
1989	Texian	Chris Antley	D. Wayne Lukas	Lloyd R. French Jr.	6 F	1:12.40	$51,480
1988	Notebook	José Santos	D. Wayne Lukas	Eugene V. Klein	6 F	1:09.40	$51,480
1987	Java Gold	Randy Romero	MacKenzie Miller	Rokeby Stable	6 F	1:09.40	$52,700
1986	Landing Plot	John C. Estrada	Harry B. Wendell	Triad Stables	6 F	1:11.00	$31,860
1985	Clever Champ	Richard Migliore	Richard M. Weiss	Robert S. Siegel	6 F	1:11.40	$33,060
