= American St. Leger Stakes =

American St. Leger Stakes (discontinued)
- Class: Grade III (2015-2017); Listed Stakes (2012-2014)
- Location: Arlington Park; Arlington Heights, Illinois, United States
- Inaugurated: 2012
- Final run: 2017
- Race type: Thoroughbred - Flat racing
- Website: www.arlingtonpark.com

Race information
- Distance: 1 11/16 miles (2,700 m)
- Surface: Turf
- Track: Left-handed
- Qualification: Three-years-old and older
- Weight: Assigned
- Purse: $250,000 (2017) $300,000 (2016) $350,000 (2015) $400,000 (2012-2014)

The American St. Leger Stakes was a Grade III American horse race run for thoroughbreds three-year-old and older from 2012-2017. The race was run over a distance of 1 11/16 miles (2,700 meters) on the turf at Arlington Park in Arlington Heights, Illinois.

Held annually in mid August, the race was run on Arlington Million Day, along with the Beverly D. Stakes and Secretariat Stakes.

In 2015, the race was upgraded to Grade III status, but the purse was reduced to $350,000.

In 2017, Postulation won the final running of the race. The race was dropped from Arlington Park's calendar the following year.

== Winners ==
Year	Winner	Age	Jockey	Trainer	Owner	Year
2017	Postulation	5	Jorge A. Vargas Jr.	Edward Graham	Runnymede Racing	2:49.45
2016	Da Big Hoss	5	Florent Geroux	Michael J. Maker	Skychai Racing LLC	2:49.47
2015	Lucky Speed	6	Andrasch Starke	Peter Schiergen	Stall Hornoldendorf	2:46.50
2014	The Pizza Man	5	Florent Geroux	Roger Brueggemann	Midwest Thoroughbreds	2:47.44
2013	Dandino	6	Ryan Moore	Marco Botti	Australian Thoroughbred Bloodstock	2:50.78
2012	Jakkalberry	6	Colm O'Donoghue	Marco Botti	Australian Thoroughbred Bloodstock	2:49.01
