= Jaipur Stakes =

- Class: Grade I
- Location: Belmont Park; Elmont, New York, United States
- Inaugurated: 1984
- Race type: Thoroughbred – Flat racing
- Website: NYRA

Race information
- Distance: 6 furlong sprint
- Surface: Turf
- Track: Left-handed
- Qualification: Three-year-olds and older
- Weight: Base weights with allowances: 4-year-olds and up: 126 lbs. 3-year-olds: 124 lbs.
- Purse: US$500,000 (2024)

The Jaipur Stakes is a Grade I American Thoroughbred horse race for horses aged three years old and older held over a distance of six furlongs on the turf scheduled annually in early June at Belmont Park in Elmont, New York. The event currently carries a purse of $500,000.

== History ==
The race is named after Jaipur, the Champion three-year-old colt of 1962 who ran one of the most memorable Travers Stakes on record.

The race was run at seven furlongs from 1986 to 2005, and again from 2011 to 2013. All other renewals have been at six furlongs.

For three years (1986, 1994, and 1995), it was run in two divisions.

In 2013, heavy rain forced the Jaipur to be moved from the turf to the sloppy main track. Because of the move, the stakes race lost its Grade III status for that renewal.

The event was a Grade III for most of its history but in 2019 it was upgraded to Grade I.

In 2024 the event was moved to Saratoga Racetrack due to infield tunnel and redevelopment work at Belmont Park.

== Records ==
Speed record:

- 6 furlongs – 1:05.67 Disco Partner (2017) new world record
- 7 furlongs – 1:20.06 Nijinsky's Gold (1994)

Margins:

- 6 lengths – To Freedom (1992)

Most wins:

- 2 – Ecclesiastic (2005, 2007)
- 2 – Disco Partner (2017, 2018)
- 2 – Casa Creed (2021, 2022)

Most wins by an owner:

- 3 – Patricia Generazio (2016, 2017, 2018)
- 3 – Michael Dubb (2009, 2010, 2019)

Most wins by a jockey:

- 6 – Jerry Bailey (1986, 1991, 1993, 1998, 2001, 2002)

Most wins by a trainer:

- 5 – William I. Mott (1989, 1998, 2006, 2021, 2022)

== Winners ==
Year	Winner	Age	Jockey	Trainer	Owner	Distance	Time	Purse	Grade	Ref
At Saratoga – Jaipur Stakes
2026	Reef Runner	5	Irad Ortiz Jr.	David Fawkes	Alex Lieblong and JoAnn Lieblong	5 1/2 furlongs	1:00.02	$500,000	I	
2025	Ag Bullet	5	John R. Velazquez	Richard Baltas	Calvin Nguyen & Joey C. Tran	5 1/2 furlongs	1:03.62	$500,000	I	
2024	Cogburn	5	Irad Ortiz Jr.	Steven M. Asmussen	Clark O. Brewster, William L. & Corinne Heiligbrodt	5 1/2 furlongs	0:59.80	$500,000	I	
At Belmont Park
2023	ƒ Caravel	6	Tyler Gaffalione	Brad H. Cox	Qatar Racing, Marc Detampel & Madaket Stables	6 furlongs	1:07.93	$400,000	I	
2022	Casa Creed	6	Luis Saez	William I. Mott	LRE Racing & JEH Racing Stable	6 furlongs	1:07.44	$400,000	I	
2021	Casa Creed	5	Junior Alvarado	William I. Mott	LRE Racing & JEH Racing Stable	6 furlongs	1:08.04	$400,000	I	
2020	ƒ Oleksandra (AUS)	6	Joel Rosario	Neil D. Drysdale	Team Valor International	6 furlongs	1:06.80	$250,000	I	
Jaipur Invitational Stakes
2019	World of Trouble	6	Manuel Franco	Jason Servis	Michael Dubb, Madaket Stables & Bethlehem Stables	6 furlongs	1:06.37	$400,000	I	
2018	Disco Partner	6	Irad Ortiz Jr.	Christophe Clement	Patricia Generazio	6 furlongs	1:06.74	$400,000	II	
2017	Disco Partner	5	Irad Ortiz Jr.	Christophe Clement	Patricia Generazio	6 furlongs	1:05.67	$300,000	III	
2016	Pure Sensation	5	Jose L. Ortiz	Christophe Clement	Patricia Generazio	6 furlongs	1:06.76	$300,000	III	
2015	Channel Marker	6	Francisco C. Torres	Philip A. Bauer	Rigney Racing	6 furlongs	1:09.48	$300,000	III	
2014	Undrafted	4	John R. Velazquez	Wesley A. Ward	Wes Welker	6 furlongs	1:07.24	$300,000	III	
Jaipur Stakes
2013	† Souper Speedy	4	Jose Lezcano	Thomas Albertrani	Live Oak Plantation	7 furlongs	1:22.09	$147,000	Listed	Off turf
2012	Upgrade	5	John R. Velazquez	Michelle Nihei	Dennis Narlinger	7 furlongs	1:21.25	$150,000	III	
2011	Right One (FR)	5	Javier Castellano	Christophe Clement	Ghislaine Head	7 furlongs	1:21.87	$100,000	III	
2010	Stradivinsky	7	Charles C. Lopez	Richard E. Dutrow Jr.	Michael Dubb, Jack Mandato & Bethlehem Stables	6 furlongs	1:07.74	$195,000	III	
2009	Silver Timber	6	Eibar Coa	Chad C. Brown	Michael Dubb & High Grade Racing	6 furlongs	1:07.60	$113,000	III	
2008	First Defence	4	Javier Castellano	Robert J. Frankel	Juddmonte Farms	6 furlongs	1:09.48	$162,966	III	
2007	Ecclesiastic	6	Javier Castellano	H. Allen Jerkens	H. Joseph Allen	6 furlongs	1:07.64	$113,800	III	
Jaipur Handicap
2006	Around the Cape	4	Cornelio Velasquez	William I. Mott	Live Oak Plantation	6 furlongs	1:07.31	$111,600	III	
2005	Ecclesiastic	4	Cornelio Velasquez	H. Allen Jerkens	H. Joseph Allen	7 furlongs	1:20.71	$100,000	III	
2004	Multiple Choice	6	Javier Castellano	James A. Jerkens	Peter E. Blum	7 furlongs	1:22.32	$112,200	III	
2003	Garnered	5	Victor Carrero	H. Allen Jerkens	Joseph V. Shields Jr.	7 furlongs	1:23.49	$112,100	Listed	Off turf
2002	Shibboleth	5	Jerry D. Bailey	Robert J. Frankel	Juddmonte Farms	7 furlongs	1:20.08	$111,900	III	
2001	Affirmed Success	7	Jerry D. Bailey	Richard E. Schosberg	Albert Fried Jr.	7 furlongs	1:21.69	$109,900	Listed	Off turf
2000	Gone Fishin	4	John R. Velazquez	Todd A. Pletcher	Dogwood Stable	7 furlongs	1:21.73	$87,150	III	
1999	Notoriety	6	Jose L. Espinoza	H. Allen Jerkens	Ethel D. Jacobs & Harbor View Farm	7 furlongs	1:21.35	$87,225	III	
1998	Elusive Quality	5	Jerry D. Bailey	William I. Mott	Sheikh Mohammed Al Maktoum	7 furlongs	1:20.99	$86,250	III	
1997	Atraf (GB)	4	John R. Velazquez	Kiaran P. McLaughlin	Shadwell Stable	7 furlongs	1:23.60	$80,243	III	Off turf
1996	Grand Continental	5	Richard Migliore	Richard O'Connell	Very Un Stable	7 furlongs	1:23.78	$86,200	III	
Jaipur Stakes
1995	Inside the Beltway	4	Jorge F. Chavez	Gary Sciacca	Team Valor	7 furlongs	1:21.23	$82,075	III	Division 1
1995	Mighty Forum (GB)	4	Gary L. Stevens	Mark A. Hennig	Constantine P. Beler	7 furlongs	1:21.12	$83,325	III	Division 2
1994	Nijinsky's Gold	5	Jose A. Santos	Richard A. Violette Jr.	Stanton Powell	7 furlongs	1:20.06	$58,176	III	Division 1
1994	A in Sociology	4	Eddie Maple	Philip G. Johnson	Frederick E. Ronca	7 furlongs	1:20.38	$58,176	III	Division 2
1993	Home of the Free	5	Jerry D. Bailey	MacKenzie Miller	Rokeby Stables	7 furlongs	1:20.69	$91,800	III	
1992	To Freedom	4	Julie Krone	John J. Tammaro Sr.	Herman Heinlein	7 furlongs	1:22.83	$92,850	III	Off turf
1991	Kanatiyr (IRE)	5	Jerry D. Bailey	Richard C. Mettee	Team Clover Stable	7 furlongs	1:23.96	$91,050	Listed	
1990	Fourstardave	5	Mike E. Smith	Leo O'Brien	Richard M. Bomze	7 furlongs	1:21.00	$95,400	Listed	
1989	Harp Islet	4	Craig Perret	William I. Mott	Bertram R. Firestone	7 furlongs	1:27.00	$95,250	III	
1988	Real Courage	5	Jacinto Vasquez	Flint S. Schulhofer	Frances A. Genter	7 furlongs	1:22.00	$100,950	III	
1987	Raja's Revenge	4	Michael Venezia	Frank LaBoccetta	Edward Anchel	7 furlongs	1:25.20	$97,000	III	
1986	Red Wing Dream	5	Jerry D. Bailey	Roy Sedlacek	Marc Barge	7 furlongs	1:23.60	$80,850	III	Division 1
1986	Basket Weave	5	Richard Migliore	Robert J. Reinacher Jr.	Greentree Stable	7 furlongs	1:22.80	$80,550	III	Division 2
1985	Mt. Livermore	4	Jorge Velasquez	D. Wayne Lukas	Lloyd R. French	6 furlongs	1:09.20	$81,700		
1984	Cannon Shell	5	Declan Murphy	Chester Ross	Seymour Cohn	6 furlongs	1:09.20	$58,800		

Legend:
Dirt Turf
Notes:
ƒ Filly or Mare
† In 2013, Big Screen was first past the post but was disqualified for interference in the stretch run and placed second. Souper Speedy was declared the winner.

== See also ==
- List of American and Canadian Graded races
