= Robert F. Carey Memorial Handicap =

- Class: Discontinued stakes
- Location: Hawthorne Race Course; Stickney/Cicero, Illinois, United States
- Inaugurated: 1983
- Race type: Thoroughbred – Flat racing
- Website: www.hawthorneracecourse.com

Race information
- Distance: 1 1/8 miles (9 furlongs)
- Surface: Turf
- Track: Left-handed
- Qualification: Three-years-old & up
- Weight: Assigned
- Purse: US$75,000

The Robert F. Carey Memorial Handicap was an American Thoroughbred horse race run from 1983 through 2013 at Hawthorne Race Course in Stickney/Cicero, Illinois. A former Grade 3 event, it was open to horses age three and older and contested on turf over a distance of one mile (8 furlongs).

Inaugurated on October 9, 1983, the race is named in honor of Robert Francis Carey, founder of the American Brick Company and the Managing Director of Hawthorne from 1947 to his death in 1980.

In 1985, 1994 and again in 2009, soft course conditions from heavy rains resulted in the race being transferred to the main dirt track.

== Records ==
Speed record:

- 1:33.40 @ 1 mile: Soviet Line (1998)
- 1:47.00 @ 1 1-8 miles: Iron Courage (1989)

Most wins:

- 2 – Homing Pigeon (1995, 1996)

Most wins by a trainer:

- 3 – Harvey L. Vanier (1989, 1995, 1996)
- 3 – Chris M. Block (2003, 2010, 2012)

Most wins by an owner:

- 3 – Nancy A. Vanier (1989, 1995, 1996)
- 3 – Team Block (2003, 2010, 2012)

== Winners ==
Year	Winner	Age	Jockey	Trainer	Owner	Dist. (Miles)	Time	Win $	Gr.
2013	The Pizza Man	4	Francisco Torres	Roger Brueggemann	Midwest Thoroughbreds	1-1/8 m	1:50.62	$75,000	
2012	Suntracer	4	Eduardo E. Perez	Chris M. Block	Team Block	1-1/8 m	1:48.75	$100,000	
2011	Princeville Condo	6	Jozbin Z. Santana	Michele Boyce	Terry Biondo & Cherrywood Stables II (Michele Boyce & Nate Ruffolo)	1-1/16 m	1:42.20	$60,000	
2010	Amazing Results	5	Eduardo E. Perez	Chris M. Block	Team Block	1 m	1:35.65	$100,000	G3
2009	Public Speaker	4	Junior Alvarado	Dale Bennett	Peter J. Karahalios	1 m †	1:42.16	$100,000	
2008	Wise River	5	Francisco Torres	Clark Hanna	Don L. Benge	1 m	1:35.04	$150,000	G3
2007	Classic Campaign	5	Richard Migliore	William I. Mott	Kinsman Stable	1 m	1:33.95	$150,000	G3
2006	No Tolerance	5	Jesse M. Campbell	Michael B. Campbell	Easy Money 2006 LLC, et al.	1 m	1:35.54	$150,000	G3
2005	Spruce Run	7	Rex A. Stokes III	Linda L. Rice	Golden Dome Stable (Robert H. & Mary Ellen Harris, Robert M. Harris)	1 m	1:39.97	$150,000	G3
2004	Scooter Roach	5	Jesse M. Campbell	David Kassen	Butterfly Stable (Larry Slavin, Lois Temkin, David Flanbaum)	1 m	1:34.51	$150,000	G3
2003	Mystery Giver	5	Carlos H. Marquez	Chris M. Block	Team Block	1 m	1:34.70	$150,000	G3
2002	Kimberlite Pipe	6	Christopher Emigh	Michael W. Wright Jr.	John D. Gunther	1 m	1:35.94	$150,000	G3
2001	Galic Boy	6	Ray Sibille	Mickey A. Goldfine	Arthur I. Appleton	1 m	1:35.10	$150,000	G3
2000	Where's Taylor	4	Corey Lanerie	Michael Stidham	Barry & Mark Golden	1 m	1:36.31	$150,000	G3
1999	Ray's Approval	6	Earlie Fires	Robert L. Irwin	James Orr Jr.	1 m	1:37.01	$150,000	G3
1998	Soviet Line	8	Shane Sellers	Kiaran McLaughlin	Maktoum bin Rashid Al Maktoum	1 m	1:33.40	$150,000	G3
1997	Trail City	6	Jerry D. Bailey	William I. Mott	William I. Mott & Robert Verchota	1 m	1:36.04	$150,000	
1996	Homing Pigeon	6	Robby Albarado	Harvey L. Vanier	Nancy A. Vanier	1 m	1:36.58	$150,000	
1995	Homing Pigeon	5	Robby Albarado	Harvey L. Vanier	Nancy A. Vanier	1 m	1:38.09	$100,000	
1994	Recoup The Cash	4	Juvenal Diaz	Jere Smith Sr.	Richard Trebat	1 m,70 yd †	1:40.91	$100,000	
1993	High Habitation	5	Gabe Retana	Michael L. Reavis	Cesar C. Tan	1 m	1:35.33	$100,000	
1992	Double Booked	7	José Ferrer	Linda L. Rice	Robert Gorham	1 m	1:39.82	$100,000	
1991	Slew the Slewor	4	Garrett Gomez	P. Noel Hickey	P. Noel Hickey	1 m	1:38.72	$150,000	
1990	Allijeba	4	Kerwin Clark	Larry Robideaux Jr.	Robert Allensworth	1 m	1:39.20	$135,000	
1989	Iron Courage	5	Dave Penna	Harvey L. Vanier	Nancy A. Vanier & Ray Roncari	1-1/8 m	1:47.00	$150,000	G3
1988	New Colony	5	René Douglas	Charlie Stutts]	Louise & Anthony DiAntonio	1-1/8 m	1:47.60	$150,000	G3
1987	The Sassman	4	Kerwin Clark	Rickey B. Harris	Phyllis & Lou Herbster, Warren Brubaker, Rickey B. Harris	1-1/4 m	2:05.40	$100,000	G3
1986	Pass the Line	5	Juvenal Diaz	Frank Solimena	Stanley M. Ersoff	1-1/4 m	2:01.00	$150,000	G3
1985	River Lord	6	Randy Meier	Sol Durschslag	Jim Nolan & Sol Durschslag	1-1/4 m †	2:06.20	$100,000	
1984	Ronbra	4	Carlos H. Marquez	J. R. "Bob" Garrard	Doris & Russell Boss	1-1/4 m	2:03.80	$100,000	
1983	Sir Pele	4	Octavio Vergara	Laz Barrera	Aaron & Marie Jones	1-3/16 m	1:55.00	$100,000	

- † Transferred from the turf course to the dirt track.
