= Fourstardave =

American-bred Thoroughbred racehorse

- Sire: Compliance
- Grandsire: Northern Dancer
- Dam: Broadway Joan
- Damsire: Bold Arian
- Sex: Gelding
- Foaled: April 2, 1985; New York
- Died: October 14, 2002 (aged 17); Belmont Park; Elmont, New York
- Country: United States
- Colour: Chestnut
- Breeder: Richard M. Bomze
- Owner: Bernard Connaughton and Richard Bomze
- Trainer: Leo O'Brien
- Record: 100: 21-18-16
- Earnings: $1,636,737

Major wins
- Empire Stakes (1987); St. Paul Derby (1988); Albany Stakes (1988); Poker Handicap (1989, 1993); West Point Handicap (1989, 1991); Daryl's Joy Stakes (1990, 1991); Jaipur Stakes (1990)

Honours
- New York-bred Horse of the Year (1991); Buried at Clare Court, Saratoga Race Course; Fourstardave Handicap at Saratoga; Fourstardave Sports Bar at Saratoga
- Last updated on July 14, 2008

Fourstardave (April 2, 1985 — October 14, 2002) was an American Thoroughbred racehorse who won at least one race at Saratoga Race Course each year from 1987 to 1994, earning him the nickname "The Sultan of Saratoga". He died of a heart attack in October 2002 at the age of 17 while preparing for a parade of retired New York bred horses at Belmont Park and was buried in Clare Court at Saratoga Race Course.

== Background ==
Fourstardave was a chestnut gelding with a white stripe on his forehead. He was bred in New York by Richard Bomze. His sire was Compliance, a son of Northern Dancer out of Sex Appeal, and thus a full brother to champions El Gran Senor and Try My Best. Compliance was himself winless in only three starts, but his breeding made Bomze buy him from Windfields Farm as a stallion prospect.

Fourstardave's dam was Broadway Joan, a daughter of obscure stallion Bold Arian. Bomze purchased her for only $2,500, but when mated with Compliance, Broadway Joan produced an impressive string of winners that earned her the title of New York Broodmare of the Year three times. Fourstardave was her second foal; Fourstars Allstar, the first American-based horse to win a European classic, was her fourth.

Fourstardave was trained by Leo O'Brien. Because of his obscure breeding and "tough" temperament, he was gelded as a youngster and had a long racing career. According to O'Brien, "He loves racing. He comes off the farm every spring ready to run. He's never really had an injury. He never sulks. He always gives you a good race. You bet $2 on him, you get a run for your money." He was sometimes almost claustrophobic in the stable though, so O'Brien cut a window in the side of his stall so Fourstardave could look at his brother Fourstars Allstar. "No kidding", said O'Brien. "We even put their feed tubs next to the window so they can eat side by side."

== Racing career ==
Fourstardave was one of the most popular horses of his time, racing from age 2 to 10. Fans called him "The Sultan of Saratoga" because he won at least one race at Saratoga Race Course each year from 1987 to 1994. Bomze said, "I'll never forget Tom Durkin's calls of Dave's races as he was breaking his own record year after year. Everyone was rooting for him, and Tom's calls would bring the crowd to a crescendo. I would go to Saratoga and look up in the stands and tell my wife, 'You know something, honey, there are a few thousand people here who have a heck of a lot more money than I do, but, boy, they'd give their right arm to have a horse like we've got.'"

Fourstardave ran mostly at Belmont Park and Saratoga but also finished in the money at Laurel, Finger Lakes, Monmouth Park, the Meadowlands, Rockingham Park, Philadelphia Park, Calder, and Canterbury Downs.

The Saratoga win streak started on August 28, 1987, when Fourstardave won the 6-furlong Empire Stakes for New-York bred two-year-olds. That year, he earned three wins in nine starts, with five seconds. The only time he finished out of the money was in the grade 1 Young America Stakes at the Meadowlands.

His first graded stakes win was in 1988 at Canterbury Downs in the St Paul Derby. That year, he also won the Albany Stakes at Saratoga. Fourstardave raced 13 times as a three-year-old, with two wins, one second, and six thirds.

In 1989, Fourstardave raced 14 times, with wins in an overnight handicap and the Poker Stakes at Belmont Park, and the West Point Handicap at Saratoga. He also finished second in the Daryl's Joy Stakes and fourth in the Bernard Baruch Handicap at Saratoga. At age 5 in 1990, he raced 14 times, winning four times. The highlights were wins in the Daryl's Joy at Saratoga and the Jaipur Stakes at Belmont.

In 1991, Fourstardave repeated his victory in the Daryl's Joy and also won the West Point Handicap, both at Saratoga. In the 1991 Daryl's Joy, he ran 1 1/16 miles in 1:38.91, setting a turf course record that stood until 2015. He was named the 1991 New York-bred Horse of the Year.

In 1992, Fourstardave ran thirteen times with two wins in allowance races, one at Belmont and the other at Saratoga. At the age of eight in 1993, he started thirteen times, with wins in the Neshaminy Handicap at Philadelphia Park, the Poker Stakes at Belmont, and an overnight handicap at Saratoga. He also finished second in the Daryl's Joy to Lure, two-time winner of the Breeders' Cup Turf and was controversially disqualified from winning the West Point Handicap. Fourstardave was invited to race in the Group 1 Hong Kong International Bowl at Sha Tin Racecourse in Hong Kong on December 12 at 1,400 metres (7 furlongs). He finished twelfth.

On July 24, 1994, Fourstardave won an allowance race at Saratoga by five lengths, keeping his streak from 1987 alive. He then started in the Bernard Baruch Handicap on August 12, in which he finished third behind Lure and eventual champion grass male Paradise Creek. His connections believed he would have won if he had not stepped in a hole while leading the race at the top of the stretch, injuring his ankle. X-Rays taken the next day revealed a hairline fracture.

Fourstardave missed the rest of the year and was never the same, finishing no better than fourth in his six starts at age 10. On August 27, 1995, he was retired. O'Brien said, "He's given us everything, more than a million horses could have given us. I would have loved to see him go out with a win with everybody cheering for him. But I know how bad I would have felt had he run worse than last time."

Fourstardave retired having made 100 starts with a record of 21 wins, 18 second-place finishes, and 16 times in third. His total earnings were $1,636,737, which at the time made him the third highest earning New York-bred in history. On the turf he was at his best, winning 15 races and almost $1 million.

== Retirement ==
Upon his retirement, Fourstardave was honored at Siro's Restaurant in Saratoga, where he was presented with an edible key to the city. A small lane was named "Fourstardave Way" in his honor.

Starting in 1996, O'Brien brought Fourstardave back to Saratoga for "a well-earned vacation", where he would jog each morning but otherwise relax. Each year, O'Brien would walk Fourstardave to the Canfield Casino in Congress Park for the annual Fourstardave Party to raise money for the Belmont Child Care Association. In 1997 (at the age of 12) Fourstardave was entered in the High Hope Steeplechase at the Kentucky Horse Park, an amateur event for charity, and finished second.

When not otherwise engaged, Fourstardave spent his final years at Another Episode Farm near Ocala, Florida. An active horse, Fourstardave was galloped by the owner of the farm every day.

Fourstardave died on October 14, 2002, at the age of 17 after having been shipped to Belmont Park to take part in a parade of retired New York-breds on New York Showcase Day. Taken out onto the track in early morning to do light training, he had a heart attack while jogging around the track.

== Honors and recognition ==
In 1996, the Daryl's Joy Stakes, which he won twice, was renamed in his honour. Fourstardave led the post parade for the 1996 renewal and later joined the winner, Da Hoss, in the winner's circle. The Fourstardave is now a Grade 1 event.

After his death in 2002, Fourstardave was buried in Clare Court at Saratoga Race Course, one of only three horses to be so honored.

On August 11, 2013, fans at Saratoga were given a commemorative Fourstardave bobblehead figure. After a fan poll in 2015, a new sports bar at Saratoga was named the Fourstardave.

== Pedigree ==
Pedigree of Fourstardave, chestnut gelding, 1985
Sire Compliance 1978	Northern Dancer; 1961	Nearctic	Nearco
Sire Compliance 1978	Northern Dancer; 1961	Nearctic	Lady Angela
Sire Compliance 1978	Northern Dancer; 1961	Natalma	Native Dancer
Sire Compliance 1978	Northern Dancer; 1961	Natalma	Almahmoud
Sire Compliance 1978	Sex Appeal; 1970	Buckpasser	Tom Fool
Sire Compliance 1978	Sex Appeal; 1970	Buckpasser	Busanda
Sire Compliance 1978	Sex Appeal; 1970	Best in Show	Traffic Judge
Sire Compliance 1978	Sex Appeal; 1970	Best in Show	Stolen Hour
Dam Broadway Joan 1979	Bold Arian; 1970	Noble Jay	Double Jay
Dam Broadway Joan 1979	Bold Arian; 1970	Noble Jay	Noble Nurse
Dam Broadway Joan 1979	Bold Arian; 1970	Riverval	River War
Dam Broadway Joan 1979	Bold Arian; 1970	Riverval	Shop Val
Dam Broadway Joan 1979	Courtney's Doll; 1971	Wakefield Tower	Nashua
Dam Broadway Joan 1979	Courtney's Doll; 1971	Wakefield Tower	Slave
Dam Broadway Joan 1979	Courtney's Doll; 1971	Rapport	Nirgal
Dam Broadway Joan 1979	Courtney's Doll; 1971	Rapport	Wise Ally (family: 9)

Fourstardave was inbred 4S x 5D to Nearco, meaning Nearco appears once in the fourth generation on the sire's side of Fourstardave's pedigree and once in the fifth generation of the dam's side.
