= Edward I. Kelly Sr. =

American racehorse trainer

Eddie Kelly
Personal information
- Born: July 30, 1921 Baltimore, Maryland, United States
- Died: September 2, 2004 (aged 83) Brooksville, Florida, United States
- Occupation: Trainer

Horse racing career
- Sport: Horse racing
- Career wins: Not found

Major racing wins
- Youthful Stakes (1950); Fall Highweight Handicap (1956, 1957); Prioress Stakes (1957); Futurity Stakes (1958); Pimlico Futurity (1952, 1958); Tyro Stakes (1958); Withers Stakes (1959); Jerome Handicap (1959); Paumonok Handicap (1959, 1983); Toboggan Handicap (1960); Equipoise Mile Handicap (1960); Sport Page Handicap (1961); Marguerite Stakes (1963); Sanford Stakes (1979); Tremont Stakes (1979); Cicada Stakes (1981); Nashua Stakes (1982); Jerome Handicap (1984); Queens County Handicap (1984); Gallant Fox Handicap (1984); Stuyvesant Handicap (1990); Stymie Handicap (1991); Kelso Handicap (1997)

Significant horses
- Intentionally, Lucky Coin

Edward Ignatius Kelly Sr. (July 30, 1921 – September 2, 2004) was a Thoroughbred racehorse trainer.

== Biography ==
Born in Baltimore, Maryland, he was the younger brother, by two years, of Thomas Joseph Kelly. In the mid-1930s, the brothers went to work for J. W. Y. Martin, a trainer and racehorse stable proprietor who owned Snow Hill Farm, in Glyndon, Maryland in the Worthington Valley. In 1937, Eddie Kelly went to work in Kentucky for Edward Moore's Circle M Ranch. However, both brothers had their careers interrupted when they joined the United States armed forces during World War II.

Eddie Kelly served with the Army in Europe, and was decorated with several medals, receiving the Purple Heart, Bronze Star Medal and Oak Leaf Cluster. Following his discharge at war's end he returned to horse racing and in 1945 obtained his training license. In 1949 he was hired by Baltimore clothing manufacturer Harry Isaacs to train for his Brookfield Farm racing stable. Brookfield would be Kelly's major client for the next forty two years until Isaacs' death in 1990.

Most notable among the horses trained by Eddie Kelly was Intentionally, the 1959 American Champion Sprint Horse. He also owned horses he trained and raced including Lucky Coin, winner of the Kelso Handicap who also set a Belmont Park turf course record of 1:32.00 for one mile.
