= Kelso Stakes =

- Class: Grade III
- Location: Saratoga Race Course; Saratoga Springs, New York, United States
- Inaugurated: 2014 (as Forbidden Apple Stakes at Belmont Park)
- Website: NYRA

Race information
- Distance: 1 mile (8 furlongs)
- Surface: Turf
- Track: Left-handed
- Qualification: Four-year-olds and older
- Weight: 124 lbs with allowances
- Purse: US$225,000 (since 2026)

The Kelso Stakes, previously held as the Forbidden Apple Stakes, is a Grade III American Thoroughbred horse race for horses aged four years old and older held over a distance of one mile (8 furlongs) on the turf held annually in mid-July at Saratoga Race Course in Saratoga Springs, New York.

== History ==
The inaugural event was named in honor of Forbidden Apple who won the 2001 Grade I Manhattan Handicap and won the Grade II Kelso Handicap twice.

The event's inaugural running was on Independence Day in 2014 at Belmont Park in Elmont, New York as the seventh race on the ten race holiday card and was won by Shadwell Stable's Sayaad who defeated the favorite Kharafa in a five horse field by 2 1/4 lengths in a time of 1:38.27 on a soft yielding turf track.

From 2014 until 2018 the event was held at Belmont Park.

In 2019 the event was moved to Saratoga. That same year the event was classified as Grade III by the Thoroughbred Owners and Breeders Association.

In 2020 due to the COVID-19 pandemic in the United States, NYRA did not schedule the event in their Saratoga summer meeting.

In 2023 NYRA announced that the event would be renamed to the Kelso Stakes. The event was renamed in honor of Kelso, Allaire du Pont's five-time winner of American Horse of the Year honors. Kelso won the Jockey Club Gold Cup at Belmont Park five times (1960–1964) consecutively at the then distance of 2 miles on the dirt.

== Records ==
Speed record:

- 1:31.67 – Voodoo Song (2018)

Margins:

- 3 1/4 lengths – Disco Partner (2017)

Most wins:

- 2 – King Kreesa (2015, 2016)

Most wins by an owner:

- 2 – Gerald & Susan Kresa (2015, 2016)

Most wins by a jockey:

- 4 – José L. Ortiz (2014, 2017, 2025, 2026)

Most wins by a trainer:

- 2 – David G. Donk (2015, 2016)
- 2 – Christophe Clement (2017, 2022)
- 2 – Chad C. Brown (2024, 2026)

== Winners ==
Year	Winner	Age	Jockey	Trainer	Owner	Distance	Time	Purse	Grade	Ref
At Saratoga – Kelso Stakes
2026	Zulu Kingdom (IRE)	4	Flavien Prat	Chad C. Brown	Madaket Stables , Michael Dubb, William Strauss, & Michael J. Caruso	1 mile	1:34.08	$225,000	III	Dead heat
2026	Mi Bago	4	Jose L. Ortiz	Mark E. Casse	Gary Barber	1 mile	1:34.08	$225,000	III	Dead heat
2025	Think Big	4	Jose L. Ortiz	Michael Stidham	Godolphin	1 mile	1:32.81	$175,000	III	
2024	Carl Spackler (IRE)	4	Tyler Gaffalione	Chad C. Brown	e Five Racing Thoroughbreds	1 mile	1:34.72	$162,750	III	
2023	Casa Creed	7	Luis Saez	William I. Mott	LRE Racing, JEH Racing Stable	1 mile	1:35.51	$175,000	III	
Forbidden Apple Stakes
2022	City Man	5	Joel Rosario	Christophe Clement	Reeves Thoroughbred Racing, Peter Searles, & Patty Searles	1 mile	1:33.76	$175,000	III	
2021	Rinaldi	5	Luis Saez	H. James Bond	Bond Racing Stable	1 mile	1:35.70	$150,000	III	
2020	Race not held									
2019	Mr. Havercamp (CAN)	5	Junior Alvarado	Catherine Day Phillps	Sean & Dorothy Fitzhenry	1 mile	1:37.50	$150,000	III	
At Belmont Park
2018	Voodoo Song	4	Manuel Franco	Linda L. Rice	Barry K. Schwartz	1 mile	1:31.67	$150,000	Listed	
2017	Disco Partner	5	Irad Ortiz Jr.	Christophe Clement	Patricia A. Generazio	1 mile	1:33.49	$150,000	Listed	
2016	King Kreesa	7	Irad Ortiz Jr.	David G. Donk	Gerald & Susan Kresa	1 mile	1:33.06	$150,000	Listed	
2015	King Kreesa	6	Jose L. Ortiz	David G. Donk	Gerald & Susan Kresa	1 mile	1:32.34	$147,000	Listed	
2014	Sayaad	4	Jose L. Ortiz	Kiaran P. McLaughlin	Shadwell Stable	1 mile	1:38.27	$144,000		

== See also ==
- List of American and Canadian Graded races
