= Casa Creed =

American racehorse

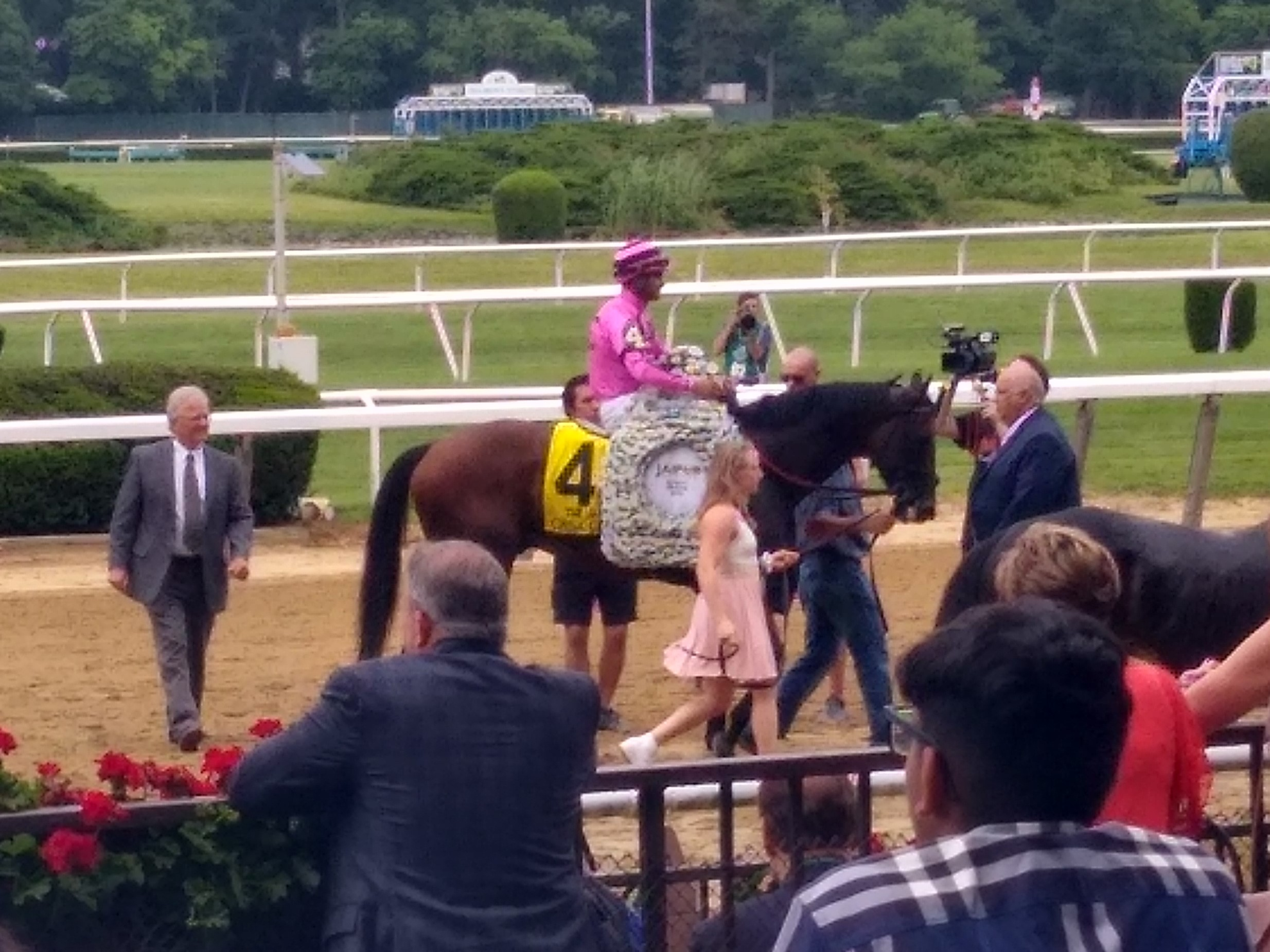
- Sire: Jimmy Creed
- Grandsire: Distorted Humor
- Dam: Achalaya
- Damsire: Bellamy Road
- Sex: Horse
- Foaled: March 21, 2016
- Country: United States
- Color: Bay
- Breeder: Silver Springs Stud
- Owner: 1. LRE Racing (until Sep. 2018); 2. LRE Racing & JEH Racing Stable (since Oct. 2018)
- Trainer: William I. Mott
- Record: 36 : 9-5-6
- Earnings: US$2,691,308

Major wins
- National Museum of Racing Hall of Fame Stakes (2019); Jaipur Stakes (2021, 2022); Fourstardave Handicap (2022, 2023); Kelso Stakes (2023)
- Last updated on 8 July 2024

Casa Creed (foaled March 21, 2016) is an American multiple Grade I turf winning Thoroughbred racehorse. His Grade I wins included the Jaipur Stakes both in 2021 and 2022 at Belmont Park, and the Fourstardave Handicap at Saratoga Race Course in 2022 and 2023.

== Background ==
Casa Creed is a bay horse bred in Kentucky by Silver Springs Stud, a son of 2012 Malibu Stakes winner Jimmy Creed out of the unraced Bellamy Road mare Achalaya. Casa Creed is the first of her six foals. Achalaya also has a two-year-old Distorted Humor colt, a yearling Omaha Beach colt, and a 2022 Authentic filly. In 2022 his sire Jimmy Creed stands at Spendthrift Farm for US$10,000.

Casa Creed was first bought at the Ocala Breeder's Sales Company 2017 Winter mixed Sale for US$15,000 from the Janie Roper consignment by Amalio Ruiz-Lozano. Later that year Casa Creed was bought for US$105,000 from the Kelli Mitchell consignment at the Keeneland September Yearling Sale by LRE Racing.

After two starts in 2018 LRE Racing sold a share to Mike Francesa, New York sports talk radio presenter's JEH Racing Stable.

Casa Creed was trained by U.S. Racing Hall of Fame trainer William I. Mott. He was retired from racing after a fourth-place finish in the Poker Stakes at Saratoga as an eight-year-old. He will stand the 2025 stud season at Mill Ridge Farm in Lexington, Kentucky.

== Statistics ==
Date	Distance	Race	Grade/ Group	Track	Odds	Field	Finish	Winning Time	Winning (Losing) Margin	Jockey	Ref
2018 – two-year-old season
Jul 28, 2018	6 furlongs	Maiden Special Weight		Saratoga	32.25	10	6	1:11.08	(9 1/2 lengths)	Junior Alvarado	
Aug 4, 2018	7 furlongs	Maiden Special Weight		Saratoga	6.80	9	1	1:23.47	1 1/2 lengths	Junior Alvarado	
Oct 6, 2018	1 mile	Champagne Stakes	I	Belmont Park	32.25	10	7	1:34.63	(15 lengths )	David Cohen	
Oct 28, 2018	7 furlongs	Spendthrift Juvenile Stallion Stakes (Note: Restricted event for two-year olds, sired by any Spendthrift owned stallion that stood at Spendthrift Farm in Kentucky, or any other location, including Louisiana, Maryland, New York or Canada in the 2015 breeding season)		Churchill Downs	3.50*	9	7	1:23.30	(10 3/4 lengths)	Junior Alvarado	
2019 – three-year-old season
Jan 5, 2019	abt. 7 1/2 furlongs	Kitten's Joy Stakes	Listed	Gulfstream Park	12.70	9	1	1:30.64	neck	John R. Velazquez	
Feb 3, 2019	1 mile	Dania Beach Stakes	Listed	Gulfstream Park	3.10	11	6	1:34.96	(9 1/4 lengths)	John R. Velazquez	
Mar 2, 2019	1 1/16 miles	Palm Beach Stakes	III	Gulfstream Park	6.60	8	2	1:41.93	(3/4 length)	John R. Velazquez	
May 4, 2019	1 1/16 miles	American Turf Stakes	II	Churchill Downs	15.90	13	9	1:44.63	(4 lengths)	John R. Velazquez	
Jun 1, 2019	1 mile	Penn Mile Stakes	II	Penn National	4.60	8	2	1:37.45	(1 1/4 lengths)	Junior Alvarado	
Jul 4, 2019	1 1/16 miles	Manila Stakes		Belmont Park	3.70	8	3	1:31.56	(1/2 length)	Junior Alvarado	
Aug 2, 2019	1 mile	National Museum of Racing Hall of Fame Stakes	II	Saratoga	2.00*	8	1	1:33.72	head	Junior Alvarado	
2020 – four-year-old season
May 21, 2020	1 mile	Allowance		Churchill Downs	5.50	10	3	1:37.09	(1 1/2 lengths)	John R. Velazquez	
Jun 20, 2020	1 1/16 miles	Wise Dan Stakes	II	Churchill Downs	8.50	9	7	1:41.15	(2 1/4 lengths)	Martin Garcia	
Aug 22, 2020	1 mile	Fourstardave Handicap	I	Saratoga	10.60	9	3	1:33.32	(2 1/2 lengths)	Junior Alvarado	
Oct 3, 2020	1 mile	Shadwell Turf Mile Stakes	I	Keeneland	10.60	9	4	1:33.99	(2 1/2 lengths)	Martin Garcia	
Nov 7, 2020	1 mile	Breeders' Cup Mile	I	Keeneland	21.90	14	12	1:33.73	(6 3/4 lengths)	Junior Alvarado	
2021 – five-year-old season
Jan 9, 2021	1 mile	Tropical Turf Stakes	III	Gulfstream Park	2.20	8	2	1:33.62	(1/2 length)	Junior Alvarado	
Mar 6, 2021	1 mile	Frank E. Kilroe Mile Stakes	I	Santa Anita	10.60	10	6	1:34.48	(1 1/4 lengths)	John R. Velazquez	
Apr 24, 2021	7 furlongs	Elusive Quality Stakes	Listed	Belmont Park	2.80	8	1	1:22.65	head	Joe Bravo	
Jun 5, 2021	6 furlongs	Jaipur Stakes	I	Belmont Park	10.80	9	1	1:08.04	2 lengths	Junior Alvarado	
Aug 14, 2021	1 mile	Fourstardave Handicap	I	Saratoga	6.20	8	3	1:33.09	(2 lengths)	Junior Alvarado	
Sep 11, 2021	6 furlongs	FanDuel Turf Sprint Stakes	III	Kentucky Downs	5.40	12	5	1:07.90 (Note: The winner Gear Jockey set a new track record for the six furlong distance at Kentucky Downs)	(3 lengths)	Junior Alvarado	
Nov 6, 2021	1 mile	Breeders' Cup Mile	I	Del Mar	37.40	13	8	1:34.01	(3 1/2 lengths)	Junior Alvarado	
2022 – six-year-old season
Feb 26, 2022	1351 metres (Note: Distance is approximately 6 furlongs and 157 yards)	1351 Turf Sprint	III	King Abdulaziz (KSA)	12.00 (Note: Casa Creed's final odds with British Bookmakers were 12/1 odds-on since gambling is prohibited in the Kingdom of Saudi Arabia)	14	2	1:18.00	(neck)	Luis Saez	
Mar 26, 2022	1200 metres (Note: Distance is approximately 5 furlongs and 212 yards)	Al Quoz Sprint	I	Meydan (UAE)	14.00 (Note: Casa Creed's final odds with British Bookmakers were 14/1 odds-on since gambling is prohibited in the United Arab Emirates)	16	5	1:08.61	(2 1/4 lengths)	Luis Saez	
Jun 11, 2022	6 furlongs	Jaipur Stakes	I	Belmont Park	4.20	13	1	1:07.44	1/2 length	Luis Saez	
Aug 13, 2022	1 mile	Fourstardave Handicap	I	Saratoga	4.20	5	1	1:34.20	1 1/2 lengths	Luis Saez	
Oct 6, 2022	1 mile	Coolmore Turf Mile	I	Keeneland	5.24	11	5	1:33.29	(2 lengths)	Luis Saez	
Nov 6, 2022	5 1/2 furlongs	Breeders' Cup Turf Sprint	I	Keeneland	11.48	14	9	1:01.79	(4 1/4 lengths)	Luis Saez	
2023 – seven-year-old season
Feb 25, 2023	1351 metres (Note: Distance is approximately 6 furlongs and 157 yards)	1351 Turf Sprint	III	King Abdulaziz (KSA)	6.00 (Note: Casa Creed's final odds with British Bookmakers were 6/1 odds-on since gambling is prohibited in the Kingdom of Saudi Arabia)	11	2	1:17.49	(head)	Luis Saez	
Jun 10, 2023	6 furlongs	Jaipur Stakes	I	Belmont Park	3.95	14	3	1:07.93	(1 length)	Luis Saez	
Jul 15, 2023	1 mile	Kelso Stakes	III	Saratoga	2.25	7	1	1:35.51	1 length	Luis Saez	
Aug 12, 2023	1 mile	Fourstardave Handicap	I	Saratoga	1.85	7	1	1:34.20	3/4 length	Luis Saez	
Nov 4, 2023	1 mile	Breeders' Cup Mile	I	Santa Anita	6.30	13	3	1:32.45	(1/2 length)	Luis Saez	
2024 – eight-year-old season
Mar 30, 2024	1200 metres (Note: Distance is approximately 5 furlongs and 212 yards)	Al Quoz Sprint	I	Meydan (UAE)	8.00 (Note: Casa Creed's final odds with British Bookmakers were 8/1 odds-on since gambling is prohibited in the United Arab Emirates)	12	7	1:07.50	(3 lengths)	Luis Saez	
Jun 8, 2024	1 mile	Poker Stakes	III	Saratoga	2.45	7	4	1:33.97	(3 lengths)	Luis Saez	

Legend:
Turf Dirt
Notes:
An (*) asterisk after the odds means Casa Creed was the post-time favorite.

== Pedigree ==
Pedigree of Casa Creed, bay horse, 2017
Sire Jimmy Creed (2009)	Distorted Humor (1993)	Forty Niner (1985)	Mr. Prospector (1970)
Sire Jimmy Creed (2009)	Distorted Humor (1993)	Forty Niner (1985)	File (1986)
Sire Jimmy Creed (2009)	Distorted Humor (1993)	Danzig's Beauty (1987)	Danzig (1977)
Sire Jimmy Creed (2009)	Distorted Humor (1993)	Danzig's Beauty (1987)	Sweetest Chant (1978)
Sire Jimmy Creed (2009)	Hookonthefeelin (1996)	Citidancer (1987)	Dixieland Band (1980)
Sire Jimmy Creed (2009)	Hookonthefeelin (1996)	Citidancer (1987)	Willamae (Canada) (1980)
Sire Jimmy Creed (2009)	Hookonthefeelin (1996)	Prospective Joy (1991)	Allen's Prospect (1982)
Sire Jimmy Creed (2009)	Hookonthefeelin (1996)	Prospective Joy (1991)	Jovial Joy (1985)
Dam Achalaya (2012)	Bellamy Road (2002)	Concerto (1994)	Chief's Crown (1982)
Dam Achalaya (2012)	Bellamy Road (2002)	Concerto (1994)	Undeniably (1987)
Dam Achalaya (2012)	Bellamy Road (2002)	Hurry Home Hillary (1995)	Deputed Testamony (1980)
Dam Achalaya (2012)	Bellamy Road (2002)	Hurry Home Hillary (1995)	Ten Cents A Turn (1990)
Dam Achalaya (2012)	Wild Heart Dancing (1996)	Farma Way (1987)	Marfa (1980)
Dam Achalaya (2012)	Wild Heart Dancing (1996)	Farma Way (1987)	Fine Tribute (1977)
Dam Achalaya (2012)	Wild Heart Dancing (1996)	Star Of Wicklow (1991)	Fast Play (1986)
Dam Achalaya (2012)	Wild Heart Dancing (1996)	Star Of Wicklow (1991)	Bright Choice (1979) (family 5-i)
