= Seek Again =

American-bred Thoroughbred racehorse

- Sire: Speightstown
- Grandsire: Gone West
- Dam: Light Jig
- Damsire: Danehill
- Sex: Colt
- Foaled: 13 April 2010
- Country: United States
- Color: Chestnut
- Breeder: Juddmonte Farms
- Owner: Khalid Abdulla; Juddmonte Farms
- Trainer: John Gosden
- Record: 8:4-2-0
- Earnings: £135,597

Major wins
- Hollywood Derby (2013); Fourstardave Handicap (2014)

Seek Again is an American-bred Thoroughbred racehorse. After winning three of his seven races in the United Kingdom he was sent to California in December 2013 and won the Grade I Hollywood Derby.

On August 9, 2014, Seek Again won the Grade II Fourstardave Handicap in a Saratoga Race Course record time.

Seek Again entered stallion duty at Stroud's Lane Farm in Reddick, Florida for the 2016 breeding season.
