= Ricks Natural Star =

- Sire: Natural Native
- Grandsire: Raise A Native
- Dam: Malaysian Star
- Damsire: Crimson Star
- Sex: Gelding
- Foaled: March 31, 1989
- Died: November 27, 2017
- Country: United States
- Color: Chestnut
- Breeder: Dub Rice
- Owner: William H. Livingston
- Trainer: William H. Livingston
- Record: 25:2-5-2
- Earnings: $6,092

Major wins
- None

Ricks Natural Star (born March 31, 1989, November 27, 2017) was a thoroughbred racehorse who became well known for being entered in the 1996 Breeders Cup Turf. At the time, the horse's last race had been 14 months earlier when he finished last in a $3,500 claiming race in New Mexico. Despite being clearly outmatched, his then-trainer and owner William Livingston paid $40,000 to enter the horse in the Breeders Cup Turf. His entry in the Breeders Cup caused controversy leading up to the race and caused the Breeders Cup to change its rules to prevent a horse like Ricks Natural Star from entering the Breeders Cup. He would finish last in the Breeders Cup Turf, beaten 180 lengths.

== Background ==
Ricks Natural Star was born in New Mexico. Bred by Dub Rice, his sire Natural Native never raced; his dam Malaysian Star won 3 of 29 races, all in New Mexico. Ricks Natural Star was the second of three foals Malaysian Star had. All three horses won races in New Mexico, but none won stakes races.

== Career ==
=== Pre-Breeders Cup ===
Ricks Natural Star began his career in 1992 in his birth state of New Mexico, where he would make all of his starts from 1992 to 1995. During this time, his career was considered unremarkable. He ran a total of 23 times, 17 of which came in 1993 alone. After 1993, he didn't race in 1994 and returned in 1995 to race only three more times. During this time in his career, the largest race that he participated in was the $17,710 San Juan Thoroughbred Derby, where he came ninth. He only won two times in those 23 races the richest race he won was a Maiden Special Weight at Ruidoso Downs The purse for the race was $2,100 earning $1,260 for the victory. He traded owners multiple times and ended up running frequently in claiming races. His final victory was on October 27, 1993, in a $3,500 claiming race. Any owner could buy him for that price, but no one did.

When he returned to racing in 1995 after a 22-month hiatus, he finished last in all three of his races by a combined by a combined 31 lengths. His final race was a 3,500 claiming race at Ruidoso Downs. In those 23 races he earned just $6,093 and the longest race he had ever run in was 1 mile.

=== Breeders Cup ===
In the summer of 1996 he was purchased privately for $3,000 by William Livingston. Livingston was seen by many as unconventional. He trained Ricks Natural Star by holding him with a leadrope in one hand while driving his pick up truck and using the trucks speedometer to time workouts. Twice during these workouts Ricks Natural Star kicked the truck as he drove it. Livingston also alleged that he had helped cure the horse with his own self made vaccine that he purported got rid of a bacterial infection the horse had. This was part of his motivation to enter Ricks Natural Star into the Breeders Cup to demonstrate his vaccines effectiveness. As well as to publicize other inventions of his that deodorised manure and cured feline Leukemia. When he told Ricks Natural Star's breeder Dub Rice of his Breeders Cup plans Rice told him "“Are you sure you got the right horse?." Livingston entered Ricks Natural Star in the Breeders Cup Turf a 1 1/2-mile race which at the time was the longest of the Breeders Cup races. Ricks Natural Star had neither raced on the turf or ran further than 1 mile.

To participate in the Breeders Cup, Livingston took out a $40,000 mortgage on his house to pay the late nomination fee. Ricks Natural Star had only earned $6,093 racing. The 1996 Breeders Cup was unique as it was the first and only time the Breeders Cup has been held outside of America being at Woodbine Racetrack in Toronto Canada. This made Rick's Natural Star's journey to the Breeders Cup even more difficult.

Livingston drove Ricks Natural Star in a 1 horse trailer from their home in Artesia, New Mexico, all the way up to Windsor, Canada. Breeders Cup rules stated a horse who had not raced for more than 30 days needed one published workout during that time. To fulfill this requirement on the way up Livingston worked Ricks Natural Star 6 furlongs at Remington Park in Oklahoma in a time of 1:21.46. But when they reached the border, Livingston and his horse were turned back because he didn't have proper paperwork for Ricks Natural Star. Livingston was later quoted as saying he called the border guard a "fat bitch" before he was turned back to Detroit.

In Detroit, Livingston stayed in a motel and made a makeshift paddock for Ricks Natural Star using ropes and tied to the bumper Livingston's pickup truck. He attempted to enter the country again with the proper paperwork a day later, and this time was allowed to enter. They arrived in Canada on October 22, 1996, 5 days before the Breeders Cup. Livingston arrived without a feed tub, water bucket, saddle, or bridle for his horse. Lisa Mcfarland the jockey who would ride Ricks Natural Star provided the saddle herself. When she worked the horse in company from the gate Ricks Natural Star ran 50 yards and stopped. Forcing her to redo leaving the starting gate to complete the training.

Only 14 horses were allowed to race in the Breeders Cup Turf, and 16 horses pre-entered the race initially. Pushing Ricks Natural Star out of the race as an also eligible. But when two horses scratched Ricks Natural Star drew into the field. In the same year that Cigar was set to make his final race Ricks Natural Star was featured on the Daily Racing Form's front page for three consecutive editions. Livingston also allowed reporters to take pony rides on Ricks Natural Star in the lead-up, with some accepting. While also claiming unabashedly that his horse was going to win. Even infamously being quoted as saying "Do you think the Sheikh [Mohammed] will be mad when I beat him?" Sheikh Mohammad had 4 horses entered that ran as a coupled entry of 1-1.

The big publicity stunt drew huge criticism from many in racing. With trainers and on air analysts concerned about how Ricks Natural Star could interfere with other runners of the race. In the morning line, he was written at starting odds of 99–1. Despite this there were some who did bet on the horse. At one point his odds dropped all the way down to 29–1, which was above the odds of other participants in the race, such as Marlin, who had won the Grade 1 Secretariat Stakes earlier in the year. When the gates opened, Ricks Natural Star's final odds were 56–1. By that point there had been 210 horses who had run in the Breeders' Cup with higher odds. The second longest shot in the field was the aforementioned Marlin at 43–1.

In the lead up to the race, Livingston said his plan for the horse was to go to the lead, and if he did, the horse would not be caught. Ricks Natural Star acted up multiple times during the post parade. Freezing and refusing to go through the tunnel to get from the paddock to the racetrack multiple times. He paraded separately from the rest of the horses and was first to be attempted to load. Again he would freeze multiple times before he was loaded in to race. When the gates opened, Ricks Natural Star took second place behind Diplomatic Jet. He had the lead for a brief moment in the first quarter mile but it was quickly snatched back by Diplomatic Jet. For the first half a mile, he stayed right next to the leader. But soon Ricks Natural Star faded fast through the pack and galloped across the finish line 28 seconds after the winner, Pilsudski. Charted by most as being outdistanced, the official margin of defeat listed was 180 lengths. Ricks Natural Star was found to have internal bleeding in the lungs after the race, and William Livingston was forbidden from racing in Ontario again until he passed a trainer's test in Ontario.

In the years following Ricks Natural Star's participation in the Breeders Cup new minimum requirement rules for a horse to be eligible to run in the Breeders Cup were implemented which prevent a similar situation from occurring. Citing Ricks Natural Star as an example for their necessary inclusion. A horse must have at least one prior start during the year the Breeders Cup is being run. As well as new rules make any horse that has started for $15,000 or less and has not won for $20,000 or more in the previous two years or has not finished second, third, fourth or fifth for $20,000 or more since running for $15,000 or less not eligible to be pre-entered.

== Retirement ==
Soon after the infamous race, Ricks Natural Star was entered in another race at Los Alamitos against Quarter Horses on November 15, 1996, three weeks after the Breeders Cup Turf. He was given a $5,000 appearance fee, and if he won the exhibition, he would get a $40,000 bonus. Ricks Natural Star was left several lengths behind by the Quarter Horses, and at the finish line he beat only one of the seven horses in the race. Ricks Natural Star ran only one more time on January 12, 1997, at Turf Paradise. There he was claimed for $7,500 by O. Dwain Grissom for Larry Weber. Larry Weber had followed the horse's whereabouts since the Breeders Cup and wished to retire the horse to stop further embarrassment. He announced Ricks Natural Star's retirement immediately after he claimed the horse. He was sent to Sunnyside Farm in Paris, Kentucky, to become a riding horse. He was also regularly given fan mail from fans of his who rooted for him during his failed Breeders Cup bid, and visitors from as far as Northern California came to see Ricks Natural Star in person at the farm. He lived at Sunnyside Farm for 20 years and passed away at age 28 on November 27, 2017.
