= Forty Niner Stakes =

- Class: Grade III
- Location: Belmont Park; Elmont, New York, United States
- Inaugurated: 1980 (as Kelso Handicap at Aqueduct Racetrack)
- Race type: Thoroughbred – Flat racing
- Website: NYRA

Race information
- Distance: One mile
- Surface: Dirt
- Track: Left-handed
- Qualification: Three-year-olds and older
- Weight: Base weights with allowances: 4-year-olds and up: 126 lbs. 3-year-olds: 122 lbs.
- Purse: $175,000 (since 2025)

The Forty Niner Stakes is a Grade III American Thoroughbred horse race for three-year-olds and older run over a distance of one mile (8 furlongs) on the dirt held annually in late October at Belmont Park in Elmont, New York. The event offers a purse of $175,000.

== History ==
The event was originally named the Kelso Handicap in honor of Kelso, Allaire du Pont's five-time winner of American Horse of the Year honors. Kelso won the Jockey Club Gold Cup at Belmont Park five times (1960–1964) consecutively at the then distance of 2 miles on the dirt. Fittingly NYRA scheduled the inaugural running of the Kelso Handicap over two miles at Aqueduct on 23 October 1980. At the time the event was the only $100,000 two mile event on the dirt in the US. The former claimer Peat Moss won the inaugural event as a 24-1 longshot in a time of 3:24 3/5. Peat Moss would repeat his winning ways the following year carrying a high-weight of 126 pounds. The 1982 running would be the last time the event would be held at the marathon distance. In 1983 the event was not held.

On 20 October 1984 the event was renewed as a 1 1/4 miles turf race on an all stakes card at Belmont Park which included the Jockey Club Gold Cup inheriting the classification status of Grade III from the Brighton Beach Handicap which became defunct with its last race on 24 August 1983.

In 1988 the event was shortened to one mile.

In 1997 the event was upgraded to Grade II. In 2009, it had been originally being scheduled for turf before being moved to the main track due to extremely heavy rain the day before and consequently was down graded to Grade III. In 2010 the event was moved to the main dirt track.

Of the more notable winners of the event is Lure. Lure ran in the event three times winning in 1993 and finishing second twice in 1992 and 1994. In 1992 although finishing second as a three-year-old later that year he went on to win the Breeders' Cup Mile. In 1993 after winning this event he followed up in his next start winning the Breeders' Cup Mile at Santa Anita Park. In 1994 Lure just failed to win the event, beaten by a nose carrying 128 pounds and giving 14 pounds to the winner Nijinsky's Gold in a thrilling stretch battle.

The event in 2022 was moved to Aqueduct Racetrack due to infield tunnel and redevelopment work at Belmont Park. The event was moved to late October and the conditions of the changed from a handicap to a stakes allowance.

In 2023 NYRA renamed the event to the Forty Niner Stakes after the late stallion Forty Niner, a winner of several NYRA Grade 1 stakes. Saratoga Race Course's Forbidden Apple Stakes was in turn renamed to the Kelso Stakes.

In 2025 the event was downgraded by the Thoroughbred Owners and Breeders Association to Grade III status.

== Records ==
Speed record:

- 1 mile (dirt) 1:32.90 – Anchor Down (2016)
- 1 mile (turf) 1:32.07 – Ashkal Way (2006)
- 1 1/4 miles (turf) – 2:01.20 – Who's For Dinner (1984)
- 2 miles (dirt) – 3:20.80 Peat Moss (1981)

Margins:

- 5 lengths – Tizway (2010)

Most wins:

- 2 – Peat Moss (1980, 1981)
- 2 – I'm a Banker (1985, 1986)
- 2 – Forbidden Apple (2000, 2001)

Most wins by an owner:

- 2 – Murray M. Garren (1980, 1981)
- 2 – Godolphin Racing (1986, 1987)
- 2 – Arthur I. Appleton (2000, 2001)
- 2 – Klaravich Stables (2018, 2020)

Most wins by a jockey:

- 4 – Javier Castellano (2007, 2008, 2012, 2016)

Most wins by a trainer:

- 4 – Todd A. Pletcher (2011, 2013, 2016, 2021)

== Winners ==
Year	Winner	Age	Jockey	Trainer	Owner	Distance	Time	Purse	Grade	Ref
At Belmont Park - Forty Niner Stakes
2026	Pentathlon	5	Paco Lopez	Claude R. McGaughey III	Phipps Stable, St. Elias Stable and Woodford Racing	1 mile	1:33.86	$200,000	III	
At Aqueduct
2025	Bishops Bay	5	Flavien Prat	Brad H. Cox	Spendthrift Farm, Steve Landers, Martin S. Schwartz, Michael Dubb, Ten Strike Racing, Jim Bakke, Titletown Racing, Kueber Racing, Big Easy Racing, Rick Kanter, Michael J. Caruso & WinStar Farm	1 mile	1:35.31	$169,750	III	
2024	Coastal Mission	5	Arnaldo Bocachica	Jeff C. Runco	Jeff C. Runco	1 mile	1:36.10	$250,000	II	
2023	Everso Mischievous	3	Cristian A. Torres	Brad H. Cox	Qatar Racing	1 mile	1:35.32	$310,538	II	
Kelso Handicap
2022	Double Crown	5	J. D. Acosta	Norman L. Cash	Lola Cash & Lynn Cash	1 mile	1:37.16	$300,000	II	
At Belmont Park
2021	Life Is Good	3	Irad Ortiz Jr.	Todd A. Pletcher	WinStar Farm & China Horse Club	1 mile	1:34.37	$279,000	II	
2020	Complexity	4	Jose L. Ortiz	Chad C. Brown	Klaravich Stables	1 mile	1:33.82	$139,500	II	
2019	Pat On the Back	5	Dylan Davis	Jeremiah C. Englehart	Harold Lerner, AWC Stables & Nehoc Stables	1 mile	1:33.97	$300,000	II	
2018	Patternrecognition	5	Tyler Gaffalione	Chad C. Brown	Klaravich Stables & William H. Lawrence	1 mile	1:34.16	$300,000	II	
2017	Sharp Azteca	4	Paco Lopez	Jorge Navarro	Ivan Rodriguez	1 mile	1:34.12	$300,000	II	
2016	Anchor Down	5	Javier Castellano	Todd A. Pletcher	Alto Racing	1 mile	1:32.90	$343,000	II	
2015	Appealing Tale	5	Joseph Talamo	Peter L. Miller	Gary Barber	1 mile	1:34.86	$400,000	II	
2014	Vyjack	4	Irad Ortiz Jr.	Rudy R. Rodriguez	Pick Six Racing	1 mile	1:34.05	$400,000	II	
2013	Graydar	4	Edgar S. Prado	Todd A. Pletcher	Twin Creeks Racing Stable	1 mile	1:34.08	$400,000	II	
2012	Jersey Town	6	Javier Castellano	Barclay Tagg	Charles E. Fipke	1 mile	1:35.24	$400,000	II	
2011	Uncle Mo	3	John R. Velazquez	Todd A. Pletcher	Repole Stable	1 mile	1:33.82	$190,000	II	
2010	Tizway	5	Rajiv Maragh	H. James Bond	William L. Clifton Jr.	1 mile	1:34.42	$250,000	II	
2009	Le Grand Cru	4	Jose Lezcano	H. Allen Jerkens	Judson Streicher	1 mile	1:37.36	$225,000	III	Off turf
2008	Tam Lin (GB)	5	Javier Castellano	Saeed bin Suroor	Godolphin Racing	1 mile	1:39.13	$248,000	II	
2007	Trippi's Storm	4	Javier Castellano	Stanley M. Hough	E. Paul Robsham Stables	1 mile	1:32.36	$249,200	II	
2006	Ashkal Way (IRE)	5	Michael J. Luzzi	Saeed bin Suroor	Godolphin Racing	1 mile	1:32.07	$250,000	II	
2005	Funfair (GB)	6	Edgar S. Prado	H. Graham Motion	Cheveley Park Farm	1 mile	1:32.95	$334,200	II	
2004	Mr O'Brien (IRE)	5	Eibar Coa	Robin L. Graham	Skeedattle Stable	1 mile	1:32.69	$270,000	II	
2003	Freefourinternet	5	Jose L. Espinoza	Joan Scott	Equirace.com LLC	1 mile	1:34.73	$347,000	II	
2002	Green Fee	6	John R. Velazquez	Daniel C. Peitz	Robert & Lawana Low	1 mile	1:33.83	$350,000	II	
2001	Forbidden Apple	6	José A. Santos	Christophe Clement	Arthur I. Appleton	1 mile	1:36.77	$250,000	II	
2000	Forbidden Apple	5	Jean-Luc Samyn	Christophe Clement	Arthur I. Appleton	1 mile	1:34.39	$250,000	II	
1999	Middlesex Drive	4	Shane Sellers	Philip M. Hauswald	C. Steven Duncker	1 mile	1:35.45	$250,000	II	
1998	Dixie Bayou	5	Jorge F. Chavez	Robert Barbara	Sabine Stable	1 mile	1:36.21	$200,000	II	
1997	Lucky Coin	4	Robbie Davis	Richard S. Nieminski	Edward I. Kelly Sr.	1 mile	1:33.72	$200,000	II	
1996	Same Old Wish	6	Shane Sellers	Robert Barbara	Friendship Stable	1 mile	1:34.42	$175,000	III	
1995	Mighty Forum (GB)	4	Eddie Delahoussaye	Mark A. Hennig	Team Valor International	1 mile	1:39.58	$200,000	III	
1994	Nijinsky's Gold	5	José A. Santos	Richard A. Violette Jr.	Stanton P. Powell	1 mile	1:34.18	$200,000	III	
1993	Lure	4	Mike E. Smith	Claude R. McGaughey III	Claiborne Farm	1 mile	1:35.86	$200,000	III	
1992	Roman Envoy	4	Craig Perret	James E. Picou	Fred W. Hooper	1 mile	1:36.39	$200,000	III	
1991	Star of Cozzene	3	José A. Santos	D. Wayne Lukas	Clover Racing Stable	1 mile	1:33.37	$116,200	III	
1990	Expensive Decision	4	Jean-Luc Samyn	Stanley R. Shapoff	Edward Shapoff	1 mile	1:32.40	$95,700	III	
1989	I Rejoice	6	Jerry D. Bailey	Edward I. Kelly Sr.	Brookfield Farms	1 mile	1:36.40	$125,600	III	
1988	San's the Shadow	4	Chris Antley	Timothy A. Hills	J. Scott Rutan	1 mile	1:42.00	$120,400	III	
1987	I'm a Banker	5	Antonio Graell	Gasper S. Moschera	Albert Davis	1 1/4 miles	2:10.80	$128,200	III	
1986	I'm a Banker	4	Antonio Graell	Gasper S. Moschera	Albert Davis	1 1/4 miles	2:03.20	$91,200	III	
1985	Mourjane (IRE)	5	Richard Migliore	Thomas J. Skiffington	Fernwood Stables	1 1/4 miles	2:02.00	$91,800	III	
1984	Who's for Dinner	5	Walter Guerra	Jan H. Nerud	Tartan Farms	1 1/4 miles	2:01.20	$96,000	III	
1983	Race not held									
At Aqueduct
1982	Worthy Too	4	Jean-Luc Samyn	Michael J. Kelly	Adele L. Rand	2 miles	3:24.40	$116,400		
1981	Peat Moss	6	Frank Lovato Jr.	Gilbert Puentes	Murray M. Garren	2 miles	3:20.80	$110,400		
1980	Peat Moss	5	Frank Lovato Jr.	Gilbert Puentes	Murray M. Garren	2 miles	3:24.60	$113,600		

Legend:
Dirt Turf

== See also ==
List of American and Canadian Graded races
