= 1984 Epsom Derby =

- Derby
- Location: Epsom Downs Racecourse
- Date: 6 June 1984
- Winning horse: Secreto
- Starting price: 14/1
- Jockey: Christy Roche
- Trainer: David O'Brien
- Owner: Luigi Miglietti
- Conditions: Good

Epsom Derby 1984
1-2-3
Secreto	El Gran Senor	Mighty Flutter

Also Ran
4-5-6
At Talaq	Alphabatim	Telios
7-8-9
Long Pond	Kaytu	Sheer Heights
10-11-12
Ilium	Pigwidgeon	Elegant Air
13-14-15
Claude Monet	My Volga Boatman	Sassanoco
16-17
Cataldi	Northern Fred	17 Ran

The 1984 Epsom Derby was the 205th annual running of the Derby horse race. It took place at Epsom Downs Racecourse on 6 June 1984. It was the first edition of the race to be commercially sponsored and was known as the Ever Ready Derby. The sponsorship meant that the first prize of £227,680 was the biggest in the history of the race.

The race was won by Luigi Miglietti's Secreto at odds of 14/1, ridden by Christy Roche and trained in Ireland by David O'Brien. The favourite El Gran Senor, trained by David O'Brien's father Vincent finished second by a short head. The colt's win was a first success in the race for owner, trainer and jockey. At the age of 27, David O'Brien was one of the youngest men to have trained a Derby winner.

== Race details ==
- Sponsor: Ever Ready
- Winner's prize money: £227,680
- Going: Good
- Number of runners: 17
- Winner's time: 2 minutes, 39.12 seconds

== Full result ==
Race result

	Dist *	Horse	Jockey	Trainer	SP
1		Secreto	Christy Roche	David O'Brien (IRE)	14/1
2	shd	El Gran Senor	Pat Eddery	Vincent O'Brien (IRE)	8/11
3	3	Mighty Flutter	Brian Rouse	David Elsworth	66/1
4	1½	At Talaq	Richard Hills	Harry Thomson Jones	250/1
5	1½	Alphabatim	Lester Piggott	Guy Harwood	11/2
6	1½	Telios	Geoff Baxter	Bruce Hobbs	100/1
7	1½	Long Pond	George Duffield	Paul Kelleway	150/1
8	5	Kaytu	Willie Carson	Dick Hern	12/1
9	1	Sheer Heights	Paul Cook	Paul Cole	100/1
10	2	Ilium	Tony Murray	Harry Thomson Jones	16/1
11	6	Pigwidgeon	Greville Starkey	Guy Harwood	150/1
12	7	Elegant Air	Bruce Raymond	Ian Balding	50/1
13	3	Claude Monet	Steve Cauthen	Henry Cecil	12/1
14	4	My Volga Boatman	Walter Swinburn	Michael Stoute	33/1
15	7	Sassanoco	Trevor Rogers	Harry Thomson Jones	500/1
16	1	Northern Fred	Gary Moore	Charles Milbank (FR)	150/1
17		Cataldi	Tony Clark	Guy Harwood	250/1

== Winner details ==
Further details of the winner, Secreto:

- Foaled: 12 February 1981, in Maryland, United States
- Sire: Northern Dancer; Dam: Betty's Secret (Secretariat)
- Owner: Luigi Miglietti
- Breeder: E. P. Taylor

== Form analysis ==
=== Two-year-old races ===
Notable runs by the future Derby participants as two-year-olds in 1983:

- Alphabatim - 1st in William Hill Futurity
- El Gran Senor - 1st in Railway Stakes, 1st in National Stakes, 1st in Dewhurst Stakes
- Elegant Air - 2nd in Lanson Champagne Stakes, 1st in Horris Hill Stakes
- Ilium - 3rd in William Hill Futurity
- My Volga Boatman - 2nd in Horris Hill Stakes

=== The road to Epsom ===
Early-season appearances in 1984 and trial races prior to running in the Derby:

- Alphabatim – 1st in Sandown Classic Trial, 1st in Lingfield Derby Trial
- El Gran Senor – 1st in Gladness Stakes, 1st in 2000 Guineas
- Claude Monet – 1st in Heathorn Stakes, 1st in Dante Stakes
- Ilium - 1st in Predominate Stakes
- Kaytu – 1st in Chester Vase
- Long Pond – 1st in Blue Riband Trial Stakes
- Northern Fred – 2nd in Premio Presidente della Repubblica
- Pigwidgeon - 3rd in Heathorn Stakes
- Secreto – 1st in Tetrarch Stakes, 3rd in Irish 2000 Guineas
- Telios – 3rd in Craven Stakes

=== Subsequent Group 1 wins ===
Group 1 / Grade I victories after running in the Derby.

- Alphabatim – Hollywood Turf Cup (1984, 1986)
- At Talaq – Grand Prix de Paris (1984), Melbourne Cup (1986)
- El Gran Senor – Irish Derby (1984)

== Subsequent breeding careers ==
Leading progeny of participants in the 1984 Epsom Derby.

=== Sires of Classic winners ===
El Gran Senor (2nd)

- Rodrigo De Triano - 1st 2000 Guineas Stakes, 1st Irish 2,000 Guineas (1992)
- Belmez - 1st King George VI and Queen Elizabeth Stakes (1990)
- Gran Alba - 1st Christmas Hurdle (1991)
- Toussaud - 1st Criterion Stakes (1992) dam of Empire Maker, Chester House and Chiselling

Secreto (1st) - Exported to USA - Later exported to Japan

- Mystiko - 1st 2000 Guineas Stakes (1991)
- Tamuro Cherry - 1st Hanshin Juvenile Fillies (2001)
- Miss Secreto - 1st Premio Regina Elena (1989)
- Staunch Friend - 1st Bula Hurdle (1993)

At Talaq (4th)

- Star Of Maple - 1st Rosehill Guineas (1994)
- Skating - 1st Winfield Classic (1993)
- Toledo - 1st Newmarket Handicap (2001)
- Al Mansour - 1st George Ryder Stakes (2000)

=== Sires of Group/Grade One winners ===
Elegant Air (12th)

- Dashing Blade - 1st Dewhurst Stakes (1989), Leading sire in Germany (1998)
- Air de Rien - 1st Prix Saint-Alary (1990)
- Ocean Air - 2nd Premio Lydia Tesio (1991)
- Montpelier Lad - 1st Anniversary Hurdle (1991)

=== Sires of National Hunt horses ===
Alphabatim (5th)

- Golden Alpha - 1st Red Rum Handicap Chase (2003)
- Mr Nosie - 1st Deloitte Novice Hurdle (2006)
- Nosie Betty - Dam of Cole Harden

Cataldi (17th)

- Trouble Ahead - 1st AGFA Diamond Handicap Chase (2000)
- Betty's Boy - 1st National Hunt Handicap Chase (1999)

=== Other Stallions ===
Claude Monet (13th) - Artistic Reef (3rd King George Stakes 1992), Sweet Revival (dam of Sweet Return) - Later exported to South Africa
Telios (6th) - Exported to Japan - Mejiro Lambada (1st Nikkei Shinshun Hai 1997)
Long Pond (7th) - Midnights Daughter (dam of One Knight)
Kaytu (8th) - Sired minor jumps winners
Ilium (10th) - Sired minor jumps winners
Mighty Flutter (3rd) - Exported to Spain
Sheer Heights (9th) - Exported to Saudi Arabia
My Volga Boatman (14th) - Exported to Turkey
Northern Fred (16th) - Exported to Australia
