= Lady Eli =

American-bred Thoroughbred racehorse

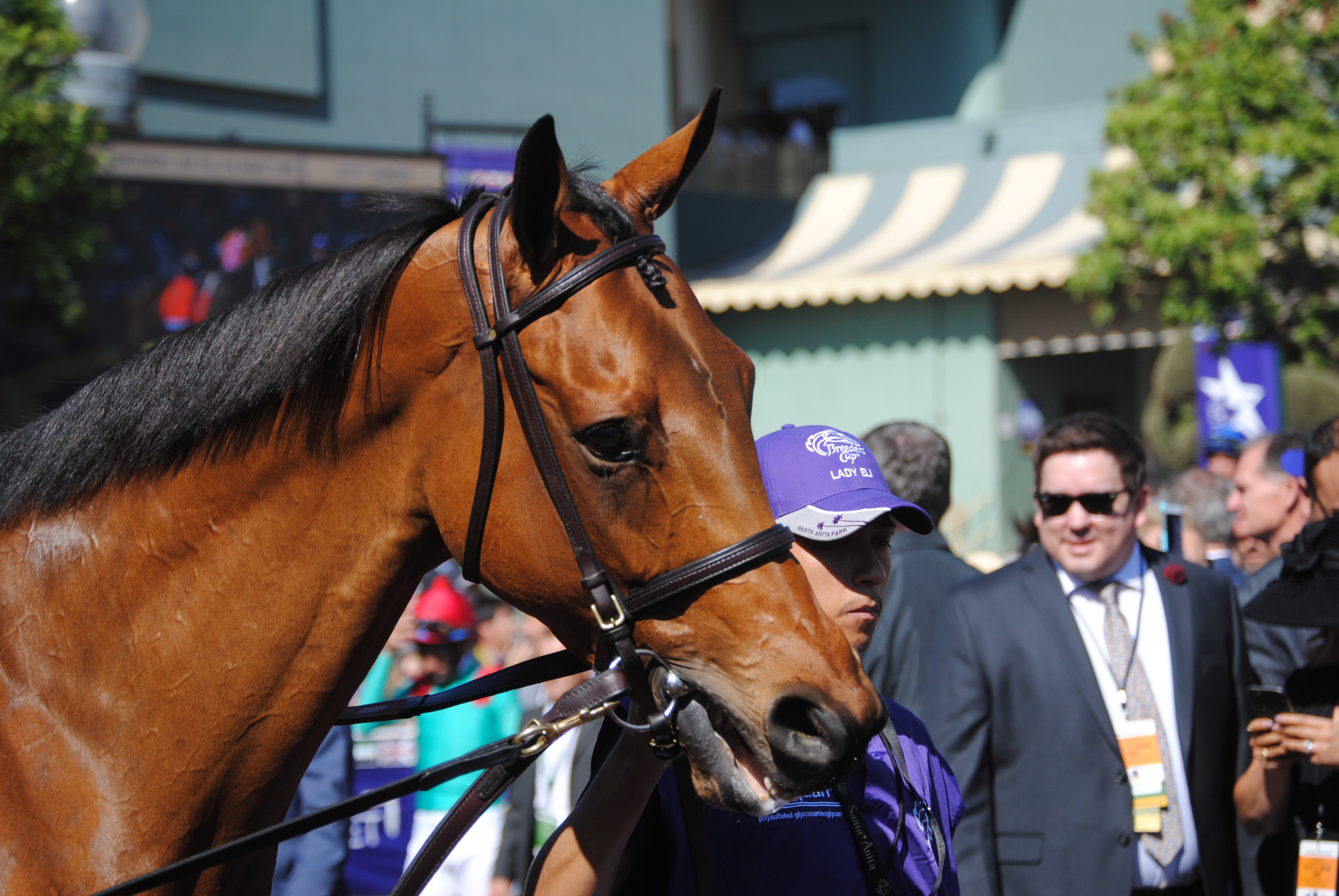
- Lady Eli in 2016
- Sire: Divine Park
- Grandsire: Chester House
- Dam: Sacre Coeur
- Damsire: Saint Ballado
- Sex: Mare
- Foaled: February 2, 2012
- Country: United States
- Colour: Dark bay or brown
- Breeder: Runnymede Farm & Catesby Clay
- Owner: Sheep Pond Partners
- Trainer: Chad Brown
- Record: 14: 10-3-0
- Earnings: $2,959,800

Major wins
- Miss Grillo Stakes (2014); Appalachian Stakes (2015); Wonder Again Stakes (2015); Belmont Oaks Invitational Stakes (2015); Flower Bowl Stakes (2016); Gamely Stakes (2017); Diana Stakes (2017); Ballston Spa Handicap (2017) Breeders' Cup wins: Breeders' Cup Juvenile Fillies Turf (2014)

Awards
- American Champion Female Turf Horse (2017)
- Last updated on January 25, 2018

Lady Eli (foaled February 2, 2012 in Kentucky) is a retired Thoroughbred racehorse who was named the American Champion Female Turf Horse of 2017. She first came to national attention when she won the 2014 Breeders' Cup Juvenile Fillies Turf. She extended her record to a perfect six wins from six starts in the 2015 Belmont Oaks Invitational Stakes but then stepped on a nail on her way back to the barn, which led to a life-threatening case of laminitis. After a lengthy recovery, Lady Eli finished second in her August 2016 return to the racetrack, then won the Flower Bowl Stakes in October. With her 2017 wins in the Gamely Stakes and Diana Stakes, she won at least one Grade I race in each of her four racing seasons.

== Background ==
Bred by Runnymede Farm, Lady Eli is by Divine Park out of Sacre Coeur, both of whom were also bred by Runnymede. Martin O'Dowd of Runnymede Farm would later say: "[Lady Eli] was very independent, but also easy to live with. She was a big, strong filly. As a yearling she was agreeable prepping for the sale; she came out and did what you asked her to do and was very willing and well-behaved. She always had a kind of seriousness about her; she never balked at anything."

As a yearling in 2013, she was sold at the Keeneland September Sale for $160,000. In April 2014 as a two-year-old in training, she was resold at the Keeneland April Sale, again for $160,000. Her new owners were Nantucket contractor Jay Hanley and Boston hedge fund manager Sol Kumin and a few of their friends, who called their stable Sheep Pond Partners after an area in Nantucket.

She was trained by Chad Brown and her jockey was Irad Ortiz Jr. Lady Eli was known on the backstretch for her bold, "tempestuous" nature, leading Brown to erect orange traffic cones around her stall to warn passers-by to take care when within range of her teeth.

== Racing career ==
=== 2014: two-year-old season ===
Lady Eli made her racing debut at Saratoga on August 25 as the favorite in a maiden race at 1 1/16 miles on the turf. She settled in the middle of the field but was blocked when she tried to make her move on the turn. When she finally got clear with an eighth of a mile to go, she accelerated rapidly and won by a nose. "She was training up to her first race in Saratoga lights out, so we had very high hopes for her — even the layperson could watch her train and see she was training better than other horses there", owner Hanley would later say. "When she finally got through in her debut, she did, she showed her turn of foot and we saw in that last 100 yards what we were seeing in the morning.

In her next start in the Miss Grillo Stakes at Belmont, Lady Eli was the fourth betting choice in a field of eleven. She tracked the pace while racing wide, then blew past the leaders to win under a hand ride.

The quality of the field for the Breeders' Cup Juvenile Fillies Turf was strong, with a good European contingent and stakes winners from across North America. Lady Eli was nonetheless the favorite and she did not disappoint. She rated in fourth and then "exploded" past the leaders in the stretch to win going away. Lady Eli completed the mile in 1:33.41, more than a full second faster than the colts went in the Juvenile Turf earlier that day.

Lady Eli was the runner-up in the Eclipse Award voting for champion two-year-old filly, traditionally dominated by horses who run on the dirt.

=== 2015: three-year-old season ===
Lady Eli returned to racing on April 12 in the Appalachian Stakes at Keeneland. The odds-on favorite, she raced behind the leaders then "shot away" in the stretch to win easily. Brown said, "we gave her a little time off this winter, but all her works have been so strong and sharp, she gave every indication she was going to come back even better at age 3."

Her next start was in the $200,000 Wonder Again Stakes at Belmont. Racing again behind the leaders, she was trapped when she tried to make her move and only got free in the final eighth of a mile, then rallied to win by half a length.

On July 4, Lady Eli faced 13 rivals in the Belmont Oaks Invitational Stakes at 1 1/4 miles. She raced in the middle of the pack, then swung wide and then drew off in "eye-catching fashion" to win by 2 1/2 lengths. She had won all six of her starts. Brown commented, "I've been lucky to have some great turf fillies and mares, but this one 'breathes different air' for sure. She certainly has the most devastating turn of foot I've ever worked around."

Following her victory in the Belmont Oaks, Lady Eli stepped on a nail with her left front foot walking back to Brown's barn from the test barn. The nail was removed, and it didn't seem a big deal at first according to her owner. But Lady Eli started favoring her right front hoof, and about a week later began showing signs of laminitis in both front feet. Brown told Daily Racing Form that Lady Eli was in a "stable but guarded condition" and that she had "been fitted with special shoes for support on both front feet." By August 13, Brown reported she was making "remarkable progress" and that she was walking sound with light exercise.

=== 2016: Four-year-old season ===
Lady Eli was turned out for two months at Dell Ridge Farm in Kentucky, then went back into training. She had a few timed workouts in early 2016, but then had some inflammation in a tendon and was given some time walking before gradually returning to regular work.

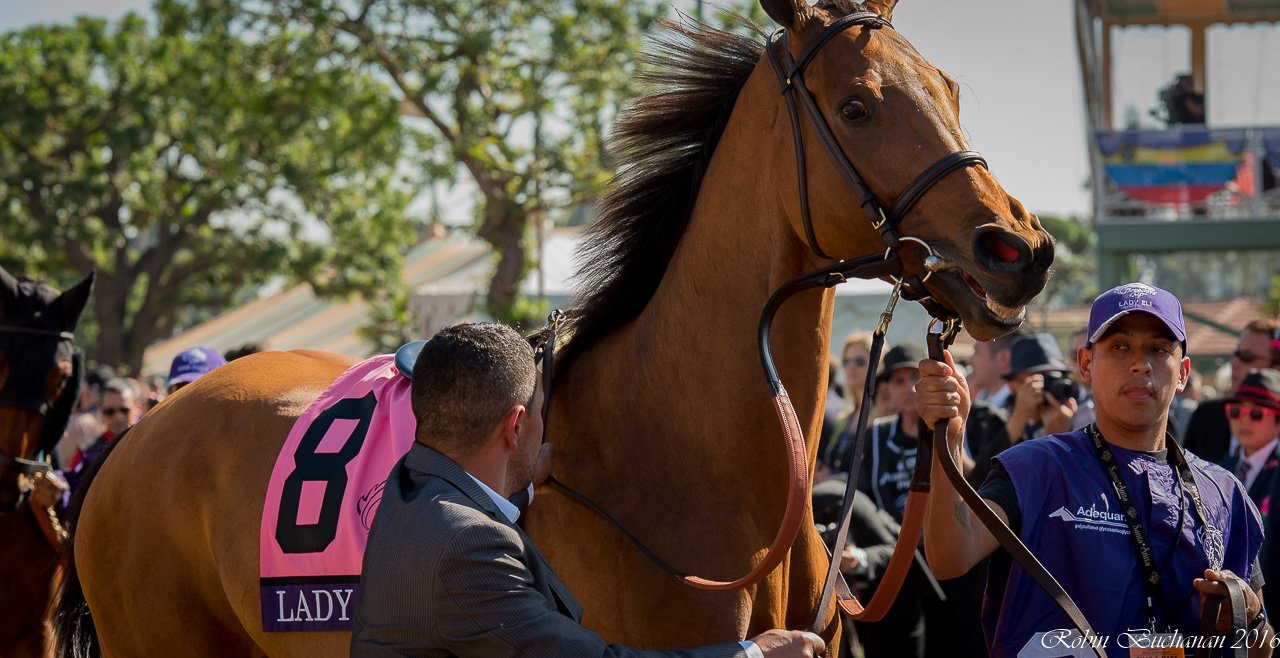
Lady Eli before the Breeders' Cup

On August 27, Lady Eli returned in the Ballston Spa Stakes at Saratoga. She raced behind the early pace then made her move around the far turn, moving into the lead before being caught in mid-stretch by Strike Charmer. Lady Eli was beaten by just 3/4 of a length by the winner, who set a stakes record.

On October 8, Lady Eli returned to the winner's circle in the Flower Bowl Stakes at Belmont Park by 3/4 lengths at odds of 4–5. Referring to her win following recovery from laminitis, Brown said, "It couldn't happen to a more deserving horse, for her to overcome all this."

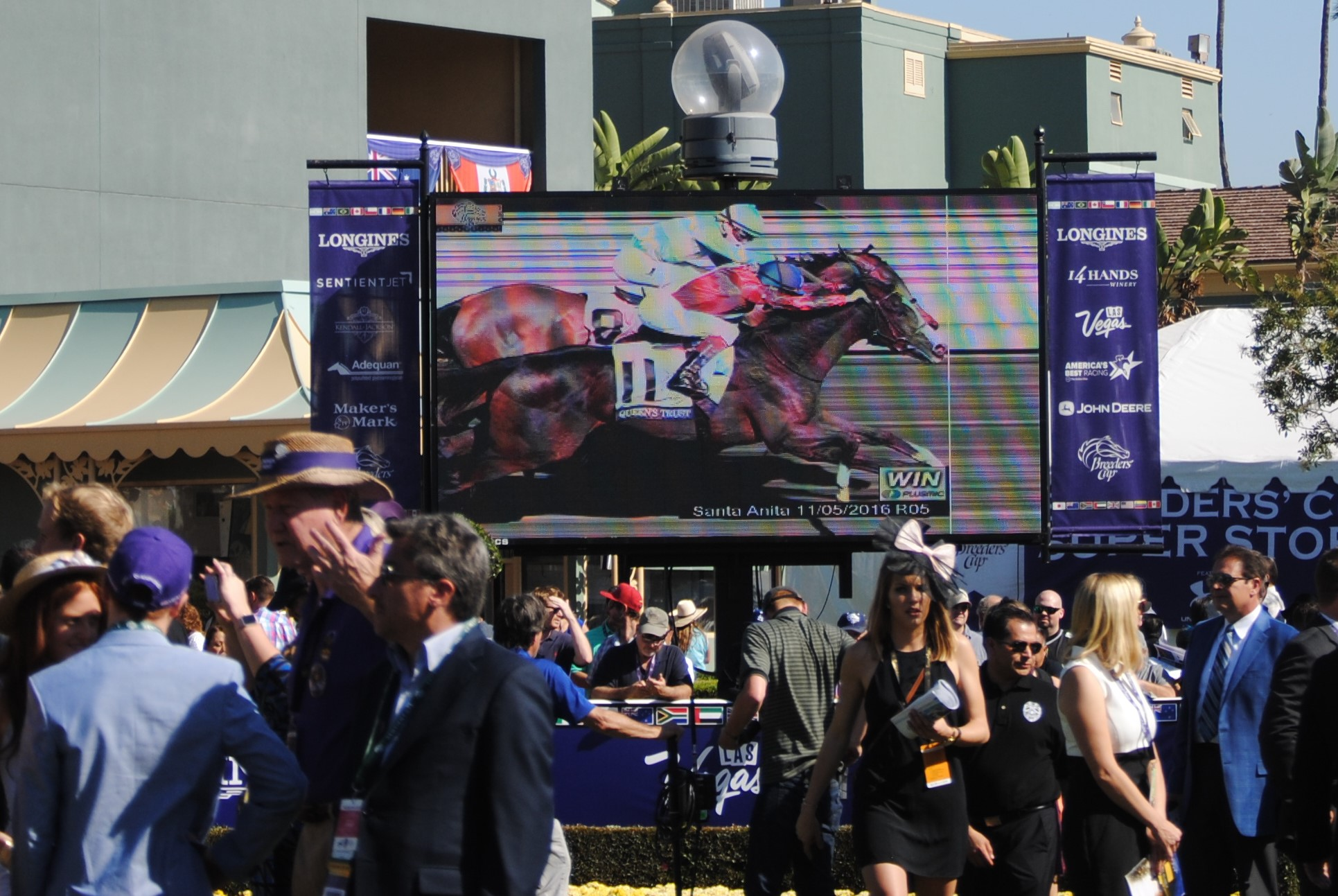
Queen's Trust beats Lady Eli by a nose in the Filly & Mare Turf

Lady Eli was the betting favorite in the 2016 Breeders' Cup Filly & Mare Turf at Santa Anita on November 5 but faced a strong field including Grade I winners Seventh Heaven (Irish Oaks, Yorkshire Oaks), Catch a Glimpse (Belmont Oaks), Sea Calisi (Beverly D), Avenge (Rodeo Drive), Al's Gal (EP Taylor), Ryan's Charm (Clasico Pamplona) and Kitcat (Club Hipico Falabella). She beat all of these but was caught in the final stride by Queen's Trust, a well-regarded English filly given a perfectly timed ride by Frankie Dettori. "We know she's incredible and we know this comeback story was singular, second to none", said Hanley. "It's just hard to see her lose by a nostril. But if she's back, she's healthy, that's all that really matters."

=== 2017: Five-year-old season ===
Lady Eli started her five-year-old campaign in the Jenny Wiley Stakes at Keeneland on April 15, 2017. As the 1-2 favorite, she hit the lead in mid-stretch but was caught at the wire by Dickinson. Brown commented, "she is a neck and two noses from being undefeated."

She made her next start on May 27 in the Gamely Stakes at Santa Anita Park. For the first mile, she ran in second place just behind a fast early pace set by Avenge, then pulled into the lead at the top of the stretch. Goodyearforroses made a late run and closed to within half a length but Lady Eli responded and stayed clear for the win.

On July 22, she was entered in the Diana Stakes at Saratoga, where she went off as the odds-on favorite in a field of six, all of whom were graded stakes winners. Before the start of the race, Lady Eli broke through the gate but the starting assistant held on to her reins and was able to stop her after only a few steps. When the race finally began, Lady Eli settled at the back of the pack then circled the field on the far turn as she started to close ground. Down the stretch, she dueled for the lead with Quidara, while Antonoe tried to make up ground along the rail. Lady Eli and Quidara drifted towards the rail and eventually closed down the hole that Antonoe was trying to go through, causing Antonoe to check her stride near the finish line. Lady Eli prevailed over Quidara by a head at the finish and then withstood an inquiry after the race. Brown, commenting that she carried eight pounds more than any other horse in the race, viewed the race as one of her best and said, "I think she's one of the all-time greats."

On August 26, Lady Eli entered the Ballston Spa Stakes in what would be her final appearance at Saratoga (it had been previously announced that she would be sold as a broodmare prospect at the Keeneland November sales.) After racing on the rail behind the early pace set by Dickinson, Lady Eli waited until a small hole opened that allowed her to get racing room on the outside. Lady Eli then quickly drew clear of the field, winning comfortably by 1 1/2 lengths. "She really is a horse of a lifetime", said Brown

Lady Eli made her final start in the Breeders' Cup Filly & Mare Turf at Del Mar on November 4. Going off as the 3-2 favorite, she lost all chance when she ran into traffic problems coming out of the chute shortly after the start. She lost her left hind shoe and suffered extensive cuts on both hind legs. She did not show any signs of lameness and continued to run, but lacked her normal closing kick and finished sixth. The day after the race, her connections announced she was expected to recover quickly but that she was being withdrawn from the Keeneland Sales to avoid putting added stress on her.

Lady Eli was voted the American Champion Female Turf Horse for 2017.

== Retirement ==
Lady Eli was officially retired in January 2018 after being given two months to recover from her injuries at Hill 'n' Dale Farms. She was bred to War Front at the start of the 2018 breeding season. While in foal, she was consigned by Hill 'n' Dale Sales Agency to the 2018 Keeneland November Breeding Stock Sale as a broodmare and was sold to Hill 'n' Dale for $4.2 million. On March 21, 2019, she foaled a bay colt.

== Statistics ==
All races on the turf.

| Date | Age | Distance | Race | Grade | Track | Odds | Field | Finish | Winning Time | Winning (Losing) Margin | Ref |
|---|---|---|---|---|---|---|---|---|---|---|---|
| Aug 25, 2014 | 2 | 1 1/16 miles | Maiden Special Weight | Maiden | Saratoga | 1.25 | 10 | 1 | 1:44.09 | nose | |
| Sep 28, 2014 | 2 | 1 1/16 miles | Miss Grillo Stakes | IIIT | Belmont | 3.90 | 11 | 1 | 1:43.50 | 3 lengths | |
| Oct 31, 2014 | 2 | 1 mile | Breeders' Cup Juvenile Fillies Turf | IT | Santa Anita | 2.40 | 13 | 1 | 1:33.41 | 2 3/4 lengths | |
| Apr 12, 2015 | 3 | 1 mile | Appalachian Stakes | IIIT | Keeneland | 0.40 | 7 | 1 | 1:35.80 | 2 1/2 lengths | |
| May 31, 2015 | 3 | 1 1/8 miles | Wonder Again Stakes | black type | Belmont | 0.20 | 8 | 1 | 1:49.94 | 1/2 length | |
| Jul 4, 2015 | 3 | 1 1/4 miles | Belmont Oaks Invitational Stakes | IT | Belmont | 0.80 | 14 | 1 | 1:59.27 | 2 3/4 lengths | |
| Aug 27, 2016 | 4 | 1 1/16 miles | Ballston Spa Stakes | IIT | Saratoga | 0.90 | 7 | 2 | 1:38.77 | ( 3/4) lengths | |
| Oct 8, 2016 | 4 | 1 1/4 miles | Flower Bowl Stakes | IT | Belmont | 0.85 | 6 | 1 | 1:59.85 | 3/4 lengths | |
| Nov 5, 2016 | 4 | 1 1/4 miles | Breeders' Cup Filly & Mare Turf | IT | Santa Anita | 1.80 | 13 | 2 | 1:57.75 | (nose) | |
| Apr 16, 2017 | 5 | 1 1/16 miles | Jenny Wiley Stakes | IT | Keeneland | 0.50 | 8 | 2 | 1:41.96 | (head) | |
| May 27, 2017 | 5 | 1 1/8 miles | Gamely Stakes | IT | Santa Anita | 0.60 | 5 | 1 | 1:45.29 | 1/2 length | |
| Jul 22, 2017 | 5 | 1 1/8 miles | Diana Stakes | IT | Saratoga | 0.95 | 6 | 1 | 1:46.14 | head | |
| Aug 26, 2017 | 5 | 1 1/16 miles | Ballston Spa Stakes | IIT | Saratoga | 0.70 | 5 | 1 | 1:39.70 | 1 1/2 lengths | |
| Nov 4, 2017 | 5 | 1 1/8 miles | Breeders' Cup Filly & Mare Turf | IT | Del Mar | 1.50 | 14 | 7 | 1:47.91 | (3 3/4 lengths) | |

== Pedigree ==
Lady Eli was sired by Divine Park, winner of the Metropolitan Handicap, when he was standing at Airdrie Stud in Kentucky. Divine Park was sold to Korea at the beginning of 2016.

Lady Eli's dam is Sacre Coeur, who had already produced Bizzy Caroline. Sacre Coeur is from a well known family, notably related to Aga Khan's Khazeen. The family has had other race horses, such as Blushing Groom, King Kamehameha and Mill Reef.

Pedigree of Lady Eli, filly, 2012
| Sire Divine Park 2004 | Chester House; 1995 | Mr. Prospector | Raise a Native |
| Sire Divine Park 2004 | Chester House; 1995 | Mr. Prospector | Gold Digger |
| Sire Divine Park 2004 | Chester House; 1995 | Toussaud | El Gran Senor |
| Sire Divine Park 2004 | Chester House; 1995 | Toussaud | Image of Reality |
| Sire Divine Park 2004 | High in the Park; 1994 | Ascot Knight | Danzig |
| Sire Divine Park 2004 | High in the Park; 1994 | Ascot Knight | Bambee T.T. |
| Sire Divine Park 2004 | High in the Park; 1994 | Czar's Princess | Czaravich |
| Sire Divine Park 2004 | High in the Park; 1994 | Czar's Princess | Honor an Offer |
| Dam Sacre Coeur 2000 | Saint Ballado; 1989 | Halo | Hail to Reason |
| Dam Sacre Coeur 2000 | Saint Ballado; 1989 | Halo | Cosmah |
| Dam Sacre Coeur 2000 | Saint Ballado; 1989 | Ballade | Herbager |
| Dam Sacre Coeur 2000 | Saint Ballado; 1989 | Ballade | Miss Swapsco |
| Dam Sacre Coeur 2000 | Kazadancoa (FR); 1978 | Green Dancer | Nijinsky |
| Dam Sacre Coeur 2000 | Kazadancoa (FR); 1978 | Green Dancer | Green Valley |
| Dam Sacre Coeur 2000 | Kazadancoa (FR); 1978 | Khazaeen | Charlottesville (GB) |
| Dam Sacre Coeur 2000 | Kazadancoa (FR); 1978 | Khazaeen | Aimee (GB) family: 22-d |

Lady Eli is inbred 5 × 4 to Nijinsky, meaning Nijinsky appears once in the fifth generation and once in the fourth generation of her pedigree. She is also inbred 5 × 5 × 6 × 5 to Northern Dancer, sire of Nijinsky and also El Gran Senor and Danzig.
