= Phoenix Tower =

Phoenix Tower may refer to:

- Phoenix Tower (Houston), a skyscraper in Houston, Texas, United States
- Phoenix Tower, Bucharest
- Phoenix Tower, Chester, a tower in Chester, England
- Phoenix Tower (horse) (born 2004), an American-bred, British-trained Thoroughbred racehorse

== See also ==
- Phoenix Towers, a skyscraper in Phoenix, Arizona, United States
- Phoenix Towers (China), proposed skyscrapers in Wuhan, China
