= Phoenix Tower (horse) =

American-bred Thoroughbred racehorse

- Sire: Chester House
- Grandsire: Mr Prospector
- Dam: Bionic
- Damsire: Zafonic
- Sex: Stallion
- Foaled: 8 April 2004
- Country: United States
- Colour: Bay
- Breeder: Juddmonte Farms
- Owner: Khalid Abdullah
- Trainer: Henry Cecil
- Record: 8: 4-4-0
- Earnings: £334,812

Major wins
- Earl of Sefton Stakes (2008)

Phoenix Tower (foaled 8 April 2004) is an American-bred, British-trained Thoroughbred racehorse and sire who despite never winning above Group 3 level, was rated one of the twenty best racehorses in the world at his peak. In an early career disrupted by training problem he won his only race as a two-year-old in 2005 and both of his starts in the following year. He won the Earl of Sefton Stakes on his debut as a four-year-old and then ran second in four consecutive Group 1 races, namely the Lockinge Stakes, Prince of Wales's Stakes, Eclipse Stakes and International Stakes. He was retired from racing at the end of the year and exported to become a breeding stallion in India.

== Background ==
Phoenix Tower was a dark bay horse bred in Kentucky by his owner, Khalid Abdullah's Juddmonte Farms. The colt was sent to Europe where he entered training with Henry Cecil at the Warren Place stable in Newmarket, Suffolk.

He was the best European-raced horse produced by his sire Chester House, who won the Arlington Million but died in 2003 after only three seasons at stud. Phoenix Tower's dam Bionic won her only race, a maiden race at Goodwood Racecourse in 1998. Her dam Bonash, who won the Prix de Malleret, also produced the John Porter Stakes winner Day Flight and was closely related to the Prix de Diane winner Nebraska Tornado.

== Racing career ==
=== 2006: two-year-old season ===
On his racecourse debut Phoenix Tower was ridden by Richard Hughes when he started at odds of 5/1 for a maiden race over seven furlongs on the polytrack surface at Wolverhampton Racecourse on 30 October 2006. He took the lead approaching the final furlong and won by one and a half lengths from the favourite Calabash Cove despite veering to the left in the closing stages.

=== 2007: three-year-old season ===
Phoenix Tower began his second campaign in a handicap race over seven furlongs at Newbury Racecourse on 20 April in which he was assigned 123 pounds and started at odds of 9/2 in a fourteen-runner field. Ridden by Hughes he tracked the leaders before taking the lead a furlong out and drew away to win "easily" by four lengths. Hughes was again in the saddle when the colt started 8/13 favourite for a minor event over one at Windsor Racecourse on 7 May and recorded another easy win, coming home two and a half lengths clear of his three opponents. Phoenix Tower subsequently had injury problems and missed the rest of the season.

=== 2008: four-year-old season ===
After an absence of eleven months Phoenix Tower returned to the track and was moved up in class and distance to contest the Group 3 Earl of Sefton Stakes over nine furlongs at Newmarket Racecourse on 17 April 2008. Ridden by Tom Queally he started the 8/1 third choice in the betting behind Pipedreamer (Cambridgeshire Handicap) and the Cecil's other entrant Multidimensional (Prix Guillaume d'Ornano). He tracked the front-running Kandidate and after briefly looking unlikely to get a clear run he produced a strong finish to gain the advantage in the final strides and win by a head and a neck from Traffic Guard and Pipedreamer. After the race Henry Cecil said "he has always been a good horse but he has had his problems. He stays further and I think a mile and a quarter will suit him".

In his four remaining races Phoenix Tower was ridden by Ted Durcan. In the Lockinge Stakes over mile at Newbury on 17 May he finished second, three quarters of a length behind the winner Creachadoir and ahead of several major winners including Haradasun and Majestic Roi. In the Prince of Wales's Stakes at Royal Ascot in June he stayed on in the straight to finish runner-up to Duke of Marmalade with Pipedreamer, Ask and Sixties Icon finishing behind. In the Eclipse Stakes over ten furlongs at Sandown Park on 5 July Phoenix Tower was made the 5/2 favourite against seven opponents headed by the Aidan O'Brien-trained Mount Nelson. After racing in fifth place he moved up to take the lead in the straight but although he stayed on "gamely" he was caught on the line by Mount Nelson and beaten a short head. Following the colt's narrow defeat Cecil commented "I thought we had it won, but Mount Nelson's head went down at the crucial moment - that's racing. I have no excuses, and our fellow has run a blinder".

The 2018 edition of the International Stakes was transferred from York Racecourse, where the ground was deemed unraceable to Newmarket on 23 August. Starting at odds of 12/1 he stayed on strongly to finish three quarters of a length second to Duke of Marmalade with the Epsom Derby winner New Approach two and a half lengths back in third. Phoenix Tower was being prepared for a run in the Champion Stakes when he sustained a tendon injury which ended his racing career.

In the 2008 World Thoroughbred Rankings Phoenix Tower was given a rating of 123, making him the nineteenth-best racehorse in the world.

== Stud career ==
At the end of his racing career, Phoenix Tower was exported to India to become a breeding stallion at the Manjri Stud Farm near Pune. His son Rochester won the Indian derby in 2018 Pune.

== Pedigree ==
Pedigree of Phoenix Tower (USA), bay stallion, 2004
Sire Chester House (USA) 1995	Mr Prospector; 1970	Raise A Native	Native Dancer
Sire Chester House (USA) 1995	Mr Prospector; 1970	Raise A Native	Raise You
Sire Chester House (USA) 1995	Mr Prospector; 1970	Gold Digger	Nashua
Sire Chester House (USA) 1995	Mr Prospector; 1970	Gold Digger	Sequence
Sire Chester House (USA) 1995	Toussaud; 1989	El Gran Senor	Northern Dancer (CAN)
Sire Chester House (USA) 1995	Toussaud; 1989	El Gran Senor	Sex Appeal
Sire Chester House (USA) 1995	Toussaud; 1989	Image of Reality	In Reality
Sire Chester House (USA) 1995	Toussaud; 1989	Image of Reality	Edee's Image
Dam Bionic (GB) 1996	Zafonic (USA); 1990	Gone West	Mr Prospector
Dam Bionic (GB) 1996	Zafonic (USA); 1990	Gone West	Secrettame
Dam Bionic (GB) 1996	Zafonic (USA); 1990	Zaizafon	The Minstrel (CAN)
Dam Bionic (GB) 1996	Zafonic (USA); 1990	Zaizafon	Mofida (GB)
Dam Bionic (GB) 1996	Bonash; 1991	Rainbow Quest (USA)	Blushing Groom (FR)
Dam Bionic (GB) 1996	Bonash; 1991	Rainbow Quest (USA)	I Will Follow
Dam Bionic (GB) 1996	Bonash; 1991	Sky Love (USA)	Nijinsky (CAN)
Dam Bionic (GB) 1996	Bonash; 1991	Sky Love (USA)	Gangster of Love (Family: 23-b)

- Phoenix Tower was inbred 3 × 4 to Mr Prospector, meaning that this stallion appears in both the third and fourth generations of his pedigree.
