= Wonder Again Stakes =

- Class: Grade II
- Location: Belmont Park; Elmont, New York, United States
- Inaugurated: 2014
- Race type: Thoroughbred – Flat racing – Inner Turf
- Website: nyra.com

Race information
- Distance: 1 1/8 miles
- Surface: Turf
- Track: Left-handed
- Qualification: Three-year-old fillies
- Purse: $200,000 (2023)

The Wonder Again Stakes is a Grade II American Thoroughbred horse race for fillies aged three years old held over a distance of 1 1/8 miles on the inner turf scheduled annually in early June at Belmont Park in Elmont, New York. The event currently carries a purse of $200,000.

== History ==
The race is named after the Grade I winner Wonder Again, full sister to Grass Wonder (Japanese-trained), who won the GI Garden City Breeders' Cup (2002) and GI Diana Handicap (2004).

The race was inaugurated on 25 May 2014 with a stakes purse of $200,000.

In 2017 the event was classified as Grade III, and promoted to Grade II in 2022.

The event is considered a preparatory race for the Belmont Oaks Invitational Stakes which is held in July.

In 2020 due to the COVID-19 pandemic in the United States, NYRA scheduled the event in their updated and shortened spring-summer meeting with a shorter distance of one mile.

In 2024 the event was moved to Aqueduct Racetrack due to infield tunnel and redevelopment work at Belmont Park.

In 2025 the event was moved to Saratoga and due to the inclement weather was held on a sloppy dirt track. In a three-horse event Nitrogen won by a stakes record 17 lengths.

== Records ==
Speed record:

- 1 1/8 miles – 1:46.34 Camber Parc (2019)

Largest margin of victory:

- 17 lengths – Nitrogen (2025)

Most wins by a jockey:

- 3 – Irad Ortiz Jr. (2014, 2015, 2024)
- 3 – José L. Ortiz (2019, 2020, 2025)
- 3 - Flavien Prat (2021, 2023, 2026)

Most wins by a trainer:

- 7 – Chad C. Brown (2015, 2017, 2019, 2022, 2023, 2024, 2026)

Most wins by an owner:

- No owner has won this race more than once.

== Winners ==
Year	Winner	Jockey	Trainer	Owner	Distance	Time	Purse	Grade	Ref
At Saratoga
2026	Fitz Right	Flavien Prat	Chad C. Brown	Michael Dubb, William H. Lawrence, The Elkstone Group (Stuart Grant) and Michael E. Kisber	1 1/16 miles	1:40.39	$300,000	II	
2025	Nitrogen	José L. Ortiz	Mark E. Casse	D. J. Stables	1 mile	1:36.16	$261,000	III	Off turf
At Aqueduct
2024	Segesta	Irad Ortiz Jr.	Chad C. Brown	Juddmonte Farms	1 1/8 miles	1:48.24	$200,000	II	
At Belmont Park
2023	Prerequisite	Flavien Prat	Chad C. Brown	First Row Partners & Team Hanley	1 1/8 miles	1:47.20	$200,000	II	
2022	Consumer Spending	Manny Franco	Chad C. Brown	Klaravich Stables	1 1/8 miles	1:50.73	$194,000	III	
2021	Con Lima	Flavien Prat	Todd A. Pletcher	Eclipse Thoroughbred Partners, Joseph F. Graffeo, Del Toro, Eric Nikolaus & Troy Johnson	1 1/8 miles	1:50.84	$200,000	III	
2020	Sweet Melania	José L. Ortiz	Todd A. Pletcher	Lawana L. & Robert Low	1 mile	1:34.24	$145,500	III	
2019	Cambier Parc	José L. Ortiz	Chad C. Brown	OXO Equine	1 1/8 miles	1:46.34	$194,000	III	
2018	La Signare (FR)	Joel Rosario	Brian A. Lynch	Madaket Stables, T&A Cambron, Bradley Thoroughbreds	1 1/8 miles	1:48.84	$200,000	III	
2017	New Money Honey	Javier Castellano	Chad C. Brown	e Five Racing Thoroughbreds	1 1/8 miles	1:48.01	$200,000	III	
2016	Time and Motion	John R. Velazquez	James J. Toner	Phillips Racing Partnership	1 1/8 miles	1:47.48	$200,000	Listed	
2015	**Lady Eli**	Irad Ortiz Jr.	Chad C. Brown	Sheep Pond Partners	1 1/8 miles	1:49.94	$200,000		
2014	Sea Queen	Irad Ortiz Jr.	Christophe Clement	Stonetower Stables	1 1/8 miles	1:49.89	$200,000		

Notes:
Fillies in bold have won the Wonder Again Stakes – Belmont Oaks Invitational Stakes double

== See also ==
- List of American and Canadian Graded races
