= Florida Oaks =

- Class: Grade III
- Location: Tampa Bay Downs; Oldsmar, Florida
- Inaugurated: 1984
- Race type: Thoroughbred - Flat racing
- Website: www.tampabaydowns.com

Race information
- Distance: 1 1/16 miles (8.5 furlongs)
- Surface: Turf
- Track: Left-handed
- Qualification: Three-year-old fillies
- Weight: 123 lbs. with allowances
- Purse: $200,000 (since 2014)

The Florida Oaks is a Grade III American Thoroughbred horse race for three-year-old fillies over the distance of 1 1/16 miles on the turf scheduled annually in mid-March at Tampa Bay Downs in Oldsmar, Florida. The event currently carries a purse of $200,000.

== History ==
The race was inaugurated on 10 March 1984, at a distance of seven furlongs on the dirt and was won by Sure Too Explode who was ridden by the Tampa Bay Downs track leading jockey Rick Luhr in a time of 1:24 2/5. The next year, the distance was changed in 1985 to 1 1/16 miles and has remained so to date.

The Florida Oaks was first upgraded to Grade III status by the American Graded Stakes Committee (AGSC) in 1996, but was downgraded to listed status in 2004.

It returned to Grade III in 2008 but was again downgraded for 2011.

In 2011 Tampa Bay Downs officials decided to switch the race to the turf. The AGSC restored the Grade III designation for the 2013 edition.

Two Florida Oaks winners, Luv Me Luv Me Not in 1992 and Secret Status in 2000, went on to win the Kentucky Oaks at Churchill Downs.

== Records ==
Speed record:

- 1 1/16 miles turf – 1:41.12 Domain Expertise (2021), Mission of Joy (2023)
- 1 1/16 miles dirt – 1:43.65 Don't Forget Gil (2009)

Margins:

- 9 lengths – R Lady Joy (2005)

Most wins by a jockey:

- 4 - Jose Lezcano (2005, 2012, 2014, 2015)

Most wins by a trainer:

- 4 - William I. Mott (2003, 2013, 2015, 2024)

Most wins by an owner:

- 3 - William S. Farish III (1995, 2000, 2001)

== Winners ==
Year	Winner	Jockey	Trainer	Owner	Distance	Time	Purse	Grade	Ref
2026	Dandona	Flavien Prat	Saffie A. Joseph Jr.	Tagermeen Racing	1 1/16 miles	1:44.71	$150,000	III	
2025	Nitrogen	José L. Ortiz	Mark E. Casse	D. J. Stable	1 1/16 miles	1:40.42	$150,000	III	
2024	Waskesiu	Junior Alvarado	William I. Mott	Chiefswood Stables Limited	1 1/16 miles	1:42.04	$155,000	III	
2023	Mission of Joy	Antonio Gallardo	H. Graham Motion	RyZan Sun Racing and Madaket Stables	1 1/16 miles	1:41.12	$200,000	III	
2022	Dolce Zel (FR)	Irad Ortiz Jr.	Chad C. Brown	Michael Dubb, Madaket Stables & Robert V. LaPenta	1 1/16 miles	1:44.18	$151,000	III	
2021	Domain Expertise	Antonio Gallardo	Chad C. Brown	Klaravich Stables	1 1/16 miles	1:41.12	$152,500	III	
2020	Outburst (GB)	Javier Castellano	Eddie Kenneally	Marc Detampel, TSF Thoroughbred Racing & Rebecca Hillen	1 1/16 miles	1:42.03	$150,000	III	
2019	Concrete Rose	Julien R. Leparoux	George R. Arnold II	Ashbrook Farm & BBN Racing	1 1/16 miles	1:43.02	$150,000	III	
2018	Andina Del Sur	Julien R. Leparoux	Thomas Albertrani	Don Alberto Stable	1 1/16 miles	1:42.37	$150,000	III	
2017	Fifty Five	Jose L. Ortiz	Thomas M. Bush	Empire Equines	1 1/16 miles	1:41.60	$155,000	III	
2016	Baciami Piccola (GB)	Julien R. Leparoux	Brian A. Lynch	Amerman Racing	1 1/16 miles	1:42.20	$155,000	III	
2015	Quality Rocks	Jose Lezcano	William I. Mott	Flavor Racing, Brous Stable, Wachtel Stable & Destiny Oaks Of Ocala	1 1/16 miles	1:43.39	$180,000	III	
2014	Testa Rossi (FR)	Jose Lezcano	Chad C. Brown	James Covello, Thomas Coleman & Doheny Racing Stable	1 1/16 miles	1:43.51	$152,500	III	
2013	Tapicat	Joel Rosario	William I. Mott	Besilu Stables	1 1/16 miles	1:41.89	$100,000	III	
2012	§ Dixie Strike	Jose Lezcano	Mark E. Casse	John C. Oxley	1 1/16 miles	1:43.30	$105,000	Listed	
2011	Dynamic Holiday	Ramon A. Dominguez	H. Graham Motion	Augustin Stable	1 1/16 miles	1:45.56	$105,000	Listed	
2010	Diva Delite	Rosemary Homeister Jr.	David A. Vivian	Barbara Vivian & Dominic Vittese	1 1/16 miles	1:46.10	$170,000	III	
2009	Don't Forget Gil	Rajiv Maragh	Mark A. Hennig	Alan Brodsky	1 1/16 miles	1:43.60	$200,000	III	
2008	Awesome Chic	Irwin J. Rosendo	Rafael Ramos	Aurora Springs Stable	1 1/16 miles	1:44.38	$200,000	III	
2007	Cotton Blossom	John R. Velazquez	Todd A. Pletcher	Dogwood Stable	1 1/16 miles	1:45.06	$200,000	Listed	
2006	Bushfire	John R. Velazquez	Eddie Kenneally	Ron & Ricki Rashinski	1 1/16 miles	1:46.25	$200,000	Listed	
2005	R Lady Joy	Jose Lezcano	Kirk Ziadie	Richard N. Averill	1 1/16 miles	1:44.58	$150,000	Listed	
2004	Ender's Sister	Pat Day	George R. Arnold II	Green Lantern Stables	1 1/16 miles	1:45.66	$150,000	Listed	
2003	Ebony Breeze	Mark Guidry	William I. Mott	Kinsman Stable	1 1/16 miles	1:45.20	$150,000	III	
2002	French Satin	Ramon A. Dominguez	Steven W. Standridge	Sabine Stable	1 1/16 miles	1:45.29	$150,000	III	
2001	Quick Tip	Richard Migliore	Neil J. Howard	William S. Farish III	1 1/16 miles	1:45.36	$150,000	III	
2000	Secret Status	Pat Day	Neil J. Howard	William S. Farish III, James A. Elkins Jr. & W. Temple Webber Jr.	1 1/16 miles	1:45.05	$125,000	III	
1999	Crown Jewel	Luis Jeronimo Martinez	Evelio Garcia	Donald Murray	1 1/16 miles	1:45.60	$100,000	III	
1998	Pantufla	Pat Day	David M. Carroll	Helen Alexander	1 1/16 miles	1:45.40	$100,000	III	
1997	Anklet	Shane Sellers	W. Elliott Walden	Alexander S. Loeb, Brad ay & Jeffrey S. Sullivan	1 1/16 miles	1:45.00	$100,000	III	
1996	Mindy Gayle	Jorge A. Guerra	Julian Canet	Tanenbaum Racing Stable	1 1/16 miles	1:45.80	$100,000	III	
1995	Sneaky Quiet	Mike E. Smith	Neil J. Howard	William S. Farish III & Temple Webber Jr.	1 1/16 miles	1:45.40	$100,000	Listed	
1994	Cavada	Kevin Whitley	A. Archie Smith Jr.	Bebe R. Dalton	1 1/16 miles	1:46.40	$100,000	Listed	
1993	Star Jolie	Eduardo O. Nunez	Ronald H. McKenzie	Five Star Stables	1 1/16 miles	1:45.60	$100,000	Listed	
1992	Luv Me Luv Me Not	Willie Martinez	Glenn S. Wismer	Philip & Judy Maas	1 1/16 miles	1:45.60	$100,000	Listed	
1991	Designated Dancer	Willie Martinez	Oliver E. Edwards	David Melin	1 1/16 miles	1:45.40	$100,000	Listed	
1990	Dance Colony	Herb McCauley	Ross R. Pearce	Buckland Farm	1 1/16 miles	1:45.20	$100,000		
1989	She's Scrumptious	Richard Murray Adkins	Glenn S. Wismer	Philip & Judy Maas	1 1/16 miles	1:46.00	$100,000		
1988	Colonial Waters	Victor H. Molina	John P. Campo	Buckland Farm	1 1/16 miles	1:44.80	$110,000		
1987	Single Blade	Julio Molina Pezua	Robert J. Reinacher Jr.	Greentree Stable	1 1/16 miles	1:45.60	$130,000		
1986	Noranc	Herb McCauley	Joseph Provost	Gallopping Acres & Hidden Point Farm	1 1/16 miles	1:44.60	$108,300		
1985	Erstwhile	Charles Hussey	Cam Gambolati	Hunter Farm	1 1/16 miles	1:48.00	$56,450		
1984	Sure Too Explode	Rick D. Luhr	Sherman Ingram	Frederick Lehmann	7 furlongs	1:24.40	$62,200		

Legend:
Dirt Turf
Notes:
§ Ran as an entry

== See also ==
- List of American and Canadian Graded races

== External sites ==
Tampa Bay Downs Media Guide 2021
