= David O'Brien (racehorse trainer) =

Irish racehorse trainer

David O'Brien is a former Irish racehorse trainer. He was the son of the successful trainer Vincent O'Brien and Jacqueline O'Brien (née Wittenoom), author and photographer.

His primary successes included Assert, who won the Irish and French Derbies, and Secreto, Derby, defeating El Gran Senor trained by his father Vincent. David O'Brien remains the youngest trainer to win the Epsom Derby, The Irish Derby and the French Derby. He was also the first foreign trainer to win this race.

He retired from training in the late 1980s and moved to France where, in 1993, he purchased a vineyard, Chateau Vignelaure, where he restored the reputation of the vineyard and as the winemaker won many French and international accolades. Until 2008, he made this winery in Provence one of the most successful, especially for rosé wines. From 2008 to 2026 the winery was owned by the owners of an online auction website and then sold for €11.2 million to Utley (the owner of Rowneybury House).
