= Runnymede Farm =

American horse breeding farm

Coordinates: 38.2477°N 84.2871°W

- Company type: Horse breeding
- Industry: Thoroughbred Horse racing
- Founded: 1867
- Headquarters: Paris, Kentucky, United States
- Key people: Founder: Ezekiel F. Clay; Current owner: Catesby Woodford Clay
- Website: www.runnymedefarmky.com

Runnymede Farm is an American horse breeding farm located outside Paris, Kentucky on U.S. Route 27, the Paris-Cynthiana Road. It is said to be the longest continuously running Thoroughbred horse farm in Kentucky, 365-acre (1.48 km^{2}) established in 1867 by American Civil War Colonel Ezekiel Field Clay.

Colonel Ezekiel Clay (1840–1920), whose father, Brutus J. Clay, was a member of the Kentucky House of Representatives and the United States House of Representatives and a breeder of Thoroughbreds and champion cattle. He was a nephew of abolitionist Cassius Clay and a cousin to Henry Clay.

== Ezekiel Clay & Catesby Woodford breeding partnership ==
In the early part of the 1870s Ezekiel Clay formed what became a successful partnership with Catesby Woodford (d. age 74 in 1923) who owned the neighbouring Raceland Farm. Woodford was a wealthy Paris, Kentucky distiller who became President of the Race Horse Owners' and Trainers' Association and whose New York Times obituary said he "was regarded as the dean of Kentucky sportsmen."

Both the partnership and Clay's Runnymede operation produced a number of top line horses. U.S. Racing Hall of Fame inductees Miss Woodford, Hanover, Ben Brush, and Roamer were bred at Runnymede Farm. As well, the farm has bred:

- Agile (b. 1902) - won 1905 Kentucky Derby
- Count Turf (b. 1948) - won 1951 Kentucky Derby
- Angle Light (b. 1970) - won the 1973 Wood Memorial Stakes, defeating Secretariat
- Tejano Run (b. 1992) - wins include the Breeders' Futurity Stakes Maker's Mark Mile Stakes and Widener Handicap
- Palace Episode (b. 2002) - won Racing Post Trophy
- Awesome Gem (b. 2003) - won San Fernando Breeders' Cup Stakes
- Divine Park (b. 2004) - wins include the Withers Stakes and Metropolitan Handicap
- Lady Eli (b. 2012) - wins include the Breeders' Cup Juvenile Fillies Turf and Belmont Oaks Invitational Stakes

Today, Runnymede Farm is owned by Catesby Woodford Clay, a grandson of founder, Ezekiel Clay.
