= Steventon Stakes =

Flat horse race in Britain

Steventon Stakes
2026
Persica	Oceans Four	Arabian Light

Previous years
2025
Royal Dubai	Rashabar	Enfjaar
2024
Phantom Flight	Al Aasy	Sons And Lovers
2023
Al Aasy	Phantom Flight	Oviedo
2022
Grocer Jack	Cadillac	Finest Sound
2021
Real World	Derab	Solid Stone

2020-2011
2020
Global Giant	Extra Elusive	Pablo Escobarr
2019
Fox Chairman	Pondus	First Nation
2018
Emotionless	Desert Encounter	Fajjaj
2017
What About Carlo	Arthenus	Best Of Days
2016
Scottish	Berkshire	Trip To Paris
2015
Intilaaq	Consort	Fire Fighting
2014
Amralah	Vancouverite	Nabucco
2013
Royal Empire	Al Waab	Dick Doughtywylie
2012
Poet	French Navy	Retrieve
2011
Dux Scholar	Hot Prospect	Anmar

2010-2001
2010
Red Badge	Distant Memories	Poet
2009
Crime Scene	Covert Ambition	Traffic Guard
2008
Passage of Time	Bankable	Hearthstead Maison
2006
Tam Lin	Windsor Knot	Khyber Kim
2005
Welcome Stranger	Belenus	Kings Quay
2004
Muqbil	Vespone	Musanid
2003
Mubtaker	Parasol	Imtiyaz
2002
Highdown	Foreign Affairs	Tobougg
2001
Sakhee	Aldwych	Delius

2000-1991
2000
Claxon	Trumpet Sound	Dehoush
1999
Rhapsodist	Pegnitz	Diamond White
1998
Chester House	Labeq	Poseidon
1997
Arabian Story	Germano	Royal Amaretto
1996
Wall Street	Salmon Ladder	Magellan
1995
Ihtiram	Dance Turn	Ionio
1994
Luhuk	Young Buster	Shintillo
1993
Bobzao	Port Lucaya	Young Buster
1992
Peto	Adam Smith	Percy's Girl
1991
Adversary	Flashfoot	Aimaam

1990-1988
1990
Madame Dubois	Stapleford Manor	Ijtihaad
1989
Citidancer	Nemesia	Spitfire
1988
Polar Gap	Golden Braid	Nail Don

The Steventon Stakes is a Listed flat horse race in Great Britain open to horses aged three years or older. It is run at Newbury over a distance of 1 mile and 2 furlongs (2,012 metres), and it is scheduled to take place each year in July. It is currently sponsored by Bet365. Prior to 1979 it was run as a handicap.

== Records ==
Leading jockey (5 wins):

- Pat Eddery - Spanish Dancer (1980), Roman Gunner (1987), Citidancer (1989), Adversary (1991), Peto (1992)

Leading trainer (8 wins):

- Sir Henry Cecil – Fools Mate (1979), Adonijah (1983), Royal Coach (1985), Citidancer (1989), Madame Dubois (1990), Peto (1992), Chester House (1998), Passage of Time (2008)

(5 wins):

- Saeed bin Suroor - Wall Street (1996), Sakhee (2001), Crime Scene (2009), Royal Empire (2013), Real World (2021)

== Winners ==
Year	Winner	Age	Jockey	Trainer	Time
1979	Fools Mate	8	Joe Mercer	Henry Cecil	2:06.56
1980	Spanish Dancer	3	Pat Eddery	Peter Walwyn	2:14.14
1981	Oraston	3	Bob Curant	Fulke Johnson Houghton	2:08.05
1982	Sancta	3	Joe Mercer	Peter Walwyn	2:06.60
1983	Adonijah	3	Lester Piggott	Henry Cecil	2:06.29
1984	Raft	3	Greville Starkey	Guy Harwood	2:05.22
1985	Royal Coach	3	Steve Cauthen	Henry Cecil	2:14.20
1986	Wassl Touch	3	Richard Quinn	Dick Hern	2:06.65
1987	Roman Gunner	3	Pat Eddery	Geoff Wragg	2:09.91
1988	Polar Gap	3	Willie Carson	Luca Cumani	2:10.77
1989	Citidancer	3	Pat Eddery	Henry Cecil	2:04.91
1990	Madame Dubois	3	Tony McGlone	Henry Cecil	2:06.82
1991	Adversary	3	Pat Eddery	Guy Harwood	2:05.25
1992	Peto	3	Pat Eddery	Henry Cecil	2:11.46
1992	Adam Smith	4	Frankie Dettori	Luca Cumani	2:11.46
1993	Bobzao	4	Richard Quinn	Terry Mills	2:05.43
1994	Luhuk	3	Willie Carson	John Dunlop	2:05.33
1995	Ihtiram	3	Willie Carson	John Dunlop	2:08.42
1996	Wall Street	3	John Reid	Saeed bin Suroor	2:01.29
1997	Arabian Story	4	David Harrison	Lord Huntingdon	2:01.42
1998	Chester House	3	Kieren Fallon	Henry Cecil	2:05.92
1999	Rhapsodist	3	Olivier Peslier	John Gosden	2:04.65
2000	Claxon	4	Gary Carter	John Dunlop	2:03.38
2001	Sakhee	4	Frankie Dettori	Saeed bin Suroor	2:03.63
2002	Highdown	3	Martin Dwyer	Marcus Tregoning	2:04.43
2003	Mubtaker	6	Willie Supple	Marcus Tregoning	2:02.34
2004	Muqbil	4	Richard Hills	John Dunlop	2:04.12
2005	Welcome Stranger	5	Luke Fletcher	James Eustace	2:03.53
2006	Tam Lin	3	Ryan Moore	Sir Michael Stoute	2:04.46
2007	Abandoned due to waterlogging
2008	Passage of Time	4	Ted Durcan	Henry Cecil	2:07.35
2009	Crime Scene	6	Ahmed Ajtebi	Saeed bin Suroor	2:12.06
2010	Red Badge	3	Richard Mullen	Richard Hannon Sr.	2:07.10
2011	Dux Scholar	3	Ryan Moore	Sir Michael Stoute	2:10.18
2012	Poet	7	Eddie Ahern	Clive Cox	2:18.71
2013	Royal Empire	4	Silvestre De Sousa	Saeed bin Suroor	2:06.33
2014	Amralah	4	Andrea Atzeni	Mick Channon	2:08.59
2015	Intilaaq	3	Paul Hanagan	Roger Varian	2:03.63
2016	Scottish	4	James Doyle	Charlie Appleby	2:07.23
2017	What About Carlo	6	Charles Bishop	Eve Johnson Houghton	2:12.78
2018	Emotionless	5	William Buick	Charlie Appleby	2:04.84
2019	Fox Chairman	3	Silvestre de Sousa	Andrew Balding	2:10.08
2020	Global Giant	5	Frankie Dettori	John Gosden	2:04.58
2021	Real World	4	Marco Ghiani	Saeed bin Suroor	2:05.09
2022	Grocer Jack	5	Tom Marquand	William Haggas	2:02.74
2023	Al Aasy	6	Jim Crowley	William Haggas	2:05.37
2024	Phantom Flight	5	Callum Shepherd	George Scott	2:09.39
2025	Royal Dubai	5	Callum Rodriguez	Owen Burrows	2:04.31
2026	Persica	5	Sean Levey	Richard Hannon Jr.	2:04.99

== See also ==
- Horse racing in Great Britain
- List of British flat horse races
