= Divine Park =

American Thoroughbred racehorse

- Sire: Chester House
- Grandsire: Mr. Prospector
- Dam: High in the Park
- Damsire: Ascot Knight
- Sex: Horse
- Foaled: 2004
- Country: United States
- Colour: Bay
- Breeder: Runnymede Farm & Catesby W. Clay
- Owner: James J. Barry
- Trainer: Kiaran McLaughlin
- Record: 9: 6-0-0
- Earnings: $612, 935

Major wins
- Withers Stakes (2007); Westchester Handicap (2008); Metropolitan Handicap (2008)
- Last updated on May 26th, 2008

Divine Park (foaled March 20, 2004, in Kentucky) is an American Thoroughbred racehorse who won the 2007 Withers Stakes, 2007 Westchester Handicap, and 2008 Metropolitan Handicap.

== Background and Racing Career ==
Divine Park was sold as a yearling in 2005 at the Keeneland September Auction, where he was purchased for owner James Barry by Charles Simon, agent for $20,000.

His best wins were the 2007 Withers Stakes, the 2007 Westchester Handicap, and the 2008 Metropolitan Handicap.

He was retired 28 October 2008 to Brereton Jones' Woodburn Stud in Kentucky. His stud fee is currently $10,000.
