= Palace Episode =

American-bred Thoroughbred racehorse

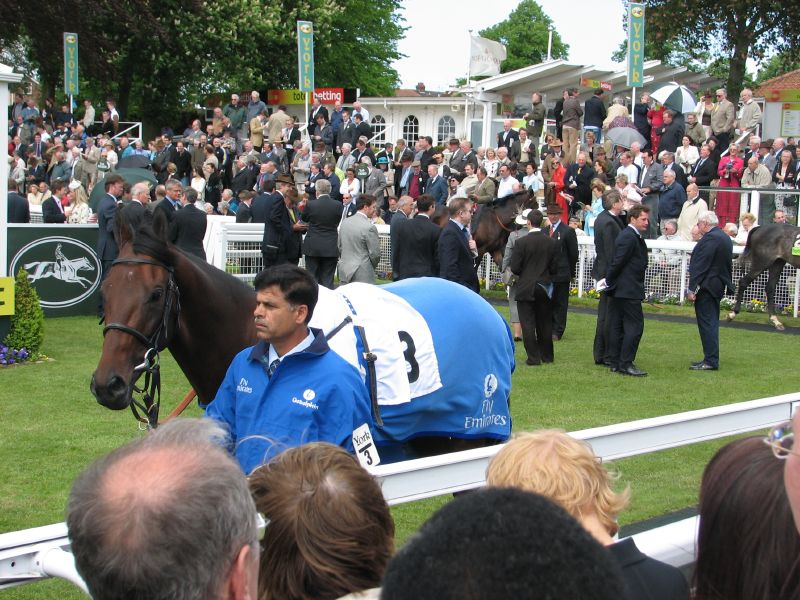
- Palace Episode at 2006 York May Festival.
- Sire: Machiavellian
- Grandsire: Mr. Prospector
- Dam: Palace Weekend
- Damsire: Seattle Dancer
- Sex: Stallion
- Foaled: 2 May 2003
- Country: United States
- Colour: Bay or Brown
- Breeder: C. W. Clay & Runnymede Farm
- Owner: Theresa Marnane; Godolphin Racing; Jack Dorrian
- Trainer: Kevin Ryan; Saeed bin Suroor; Andrew McKeever
- Record: 17: 4-1-3
- Earnings: $375,137

Major wins
- Acomb Stakes (2005); Racing Post Trophy (2005)

Palace Episode (foaled 2 May 2003) is an American-bred Thoroughbred racehorse and sire. After being sold for $100,000 as a yearling he was sent to Europe where he made a considerable impact as a two-year-old in 2005. He won on his racecourse debut, took the Acomb Stakes on his next appearance, finished third in the Royal Lodge Stakes and fifth in the Dewhurst Stakes before ending his season by winning the Group One Racing Post Trophy. After running poorly in his only appearance in 2006 he was sent to race in the United States where he had relatively little success, winning one minor race in three years before being retired at the end of the 2009 season.

== Background ==
Palace Episode is a small dark bay or brown horse bred in Kentucky by C W Clay & Runnymede Farm. He was sired by Machiavellian, an American-bred, French-trained racehorse who was one of the leading European two-year-olds of his generation, winning the Prix Morny and the Prix de la Salamandre in 1989. He later became a very successful breeding stallion, siring leading winners including Almutawakel, Medicean, Street Cry and Storming Home. Palace Episode's dam Palace Weekend never raced but was a descendant of Aimee, a British broodmare who was the female-line ancestor of numerous major winners including Blushing Groom and King Kamehameha.

In September 2004 the yearling colt was offered for sale at Keeneland and was bought for $100,000 by the bloodstock agent Peter Doyle. He was sent to Europe and entered the ownership of Con Marnane, who specialised in buying yearlings and then selling them on at a profit in "breeze-up" sales (sales in which the entrants are publicly exercised before being auctioned). The colt was entered in the Tattersalls breeze-up sale in April 2005 but failed to reach his reserve price of 44,000 guineas. The colt raced in the colours of Con Marnane's wife Theresa and was sent into training with the former jump jockey Kevin Ryan at Hambleton, North Yorkshire.

== Racing career ==
=== 2005: two-year-old season ===
On his first racecourse appearance, Palace Episode contested a six furlong maiden race at Catterick Racecourse on 20 July and started at odds of 4/1 in a ten-runner field. He was restrained in the early stages by his jockey Neil Callan before taking the lead a furlong out and winning "comfortably" by a length from Johannes. Kieren Fallon took over the ride when the colt was stepped up in class and started a 16/1 outsider for the Listed Acomb Stakes at York Racecourse in August. After tracking the leaders he was switched right to race down the wide outside in the straight, took the lead well inside the final furlong and won by a length and a quarter from Araafa. Palace Episode was moved up again in class and distance for the Group Two Royal Lodge Stakes over one mile at Ascot Racecourse on 25 September. With Callan back in the saddle he stayed on well in the straight without looking likely to win and finished third behind Leo and Kilworth.

Despite his defeat at Ascot, Palace Episode was stepped up to Group One level for the Dewhurst Stakes at Newmarket Racecourse on 15 October. Starting a 25/1 outsider he took the lead approaching the final furlong but was overtaken in the closing stages and finished fifth behind Sir Percy, Horatio Nelson, Opera Cape and Red Clubs. The colt contested his second Group One in seven days when he started at 20/1 in a seven-runner field for the Racing Post Trophy at Doncaster Racecourse a week later. The Irish stable of Aidan O'Brien had three representatives: the favourite Septimus (winner of the Beresford Stakes), Dylan Thomas and Arabian Prince. The other three runners were Kilworth and the maiden race winners Winged Cupid and Best Alibi. Neil Callan settled the colt just behind the leaders as Winged Cupid set the pace, before making a forward move just after half way. He overtook the leader inside the last quarter mile and stayed on to win by one and a half lengths from Winged Cupid with Septimus in third.

Kevin Ryan, who had trained his first Group One winner when Amadeus Wolf won the Middle Park Stakes less than a month earlier said, "I was probably a bit easy on him before his run in the Dewhurst Stakes last week but it has come good today. It's been unbelievable this year, especially with the two Group One winners we have had. The team at home have worked very hard and are getting the results. It's very lucky for a trainer like me to get horses like these. I'm going to enjoy it while it's happening. These horses don't come along very often". Commenting on Palace Episode's prospects he added "He's a very good horse who is entitled to go for very good races. He'll definitely stay a mile and a half and we'll just have to see how he matures over the winter. And if we think the Derby, or even the Guineas, will be for him, than maybe that's where we'll end up".

=== 2006: three-year-old season ===
Before the start of the 2006 season, Palace Episode was acquired by Sheikh Mohammed's Godolphin Racing organisation and joined the training table of Saeed bin Suroor.

On his first appearance for his new connections, Palace Episode contested the Dante Stakes (a major trial race for The Derby) over ten and a half furlongs at York in May and started second favourite behind Septimus at odds of 100/30. Ridden by Frankie Dettori he led in the early stages before settling in second but weakened rapidly in the straight and was virtually pulled up in the final furlong to finish tailed-off last of the six runners. Godolphin's racing manager, Simon Crisford, offered no immediate explanation for the colt's performance.

=== Later career ===
In March 2007 Palace Episode was transferred North America where he remained for the rest of his racing career. Saeed bin Suroor remained as his official trainer, but the day-to-day handling of the horse was managed by Rick Mettee. After finishing seventh on his seasonal debut at Belmont Park he recorded his only win of the year in an allowance race at Saratoga Race Course on 15 August. He then finished third to Trippi's Storm in the Grade II Kelso Handicap but finished unplaced on his last two starts of the year.

As a five-year-old, Palace Episode made only three appearances, finishing third in an allowance at Gulfstream Park in January before running unplaced in the Gulfstream Park Turf Handicap in February and an allowance at Keeneland in April. In 2009 Palace Episode entered the ownership of Jack Dorrian, with Andrew McKeever taking over as his trainer. The horse failed to win in three starts, finishing seventh and second in two allowances at Churchill Downs in June and fourth in a similar event at Arlington Park in July.

== Stud record ==
At the end of his racing career Palace Episode returned to Europe to become a breeding stallion at Haras du Logis Saint Germain in France. As of February 2016, he has sired a few minor winners.

== Pedigree ==
Pedigree of Palace Episode (USA), bay or brown stallion, 2003
Sire Machiavellian (USA) 1987	Mr. Prospector (USA); 1970	Raise a Native	Native Dancer
Sire Machiavellian (USA) 1987	Mr. Prospector (USA); 1970	Raise a Native	Raise You
Sire Machiavellian (USA) 1987	Mr. Prospector (USA); 1970	Gold Digger	Nashua
Sire Machiavellian (USA) 1987	Mr. Prospector (USA); 1970	Gold Digger	Sequence
Sire Machiavellian (USA) 1987	Coup de Folie (USA); 1982	Halo	Hail To Reason
Sire Machiavellian (USA) 1987	Coup de Folie (USA); 1982	Halo	Cosmah
Sire Machiavellian (USA) 1987	Coup de Folie (USA); 1982	Raise The Standard	Hoist The Flag
Sire Machiavellian (USA) 1987	Coup de Folie (USA); 1982	Raise The Standard	Natalma
Dam Palace Weekend (USA) 1995	Seattle Dancer (USA); 1984	Nijinsky	Northern Dancer
Dam Palace Weekend (USA) 1995	Seattle Dancer (USA); 1984	Nijinsky	Flaming Page
Dam Palace Weekend (USA) 1995	Seattle Dancer (USA); 1984	My Charmer	Poker
Dam Palace Weekend (USA) 1995	Seattle Dancer (USA); 1984	My Charmer	Fair Charmer
Dam Palace Weekend (USA) 1995	Royal Run (USA); 1986	Wavering Monarch	Majestic Light
Dam Palace Weekend (USA) 1995	Royal Run (USA); 1986	Wavering Monarch	Uncommitted
Dam Palace Weekend (USA) 1995	Royal Run (USA); 1986	Kazadancoa	Green Dancer
Dam Palace Weekend (USA) 1995	Royal Run (USA); 1986	Kazadancoa	Khazaeen (Family: 22-d)
