= Windfields Farm (Maryland) =

Former stud farm for Thoroughbred horses

Coordinates: 43°57′18″N 78°54′3″W

Windfields Farm in Chesapeake City was Maryland's leading stud farm for Thoroughbred horses before it closed in 1988.

== Overview ==
Windfields Farm was owned by Canadian businessman E. P. Taylor, who bought the Maryland property in 1964 at the recommendation of Allaire du Pont. He originally used the farm to board horses to be closer to American racing. This changed when his champion Northern Dancer retired to stud.

Northern Dancer had been raised on the original Windfields Farm in Ontario, and he initially stood there as well. However, his first crops were so successful that Northern Dancer was moved to Maryland in 1969, where he had more access to high-quality mares. Northern Dancer became one of the most successful sires of all times.

A series of notable horses retired to stud at Windfields, including El Gran Senor and Assert. Shareef Dancer, Devil's Bag and Secreto were bred on the farm. The farm's most profitable horse, Northern Dancer, retired from stud in the spring of 1987, and the owners decided that it was no longer profitable to run a stud farm in Maryland, where costs were very high. The remaining horses were sold to farms in other states.

== The Northern Dancer legacy ==
=== Most influential sire of the 20th century ===
Windfields Farm in Ontario is the birthplace of racing great and champion sire Northern Dancer, winner of the 1964 Kentucky Derby, in stakes record time, the Preakness Stakes, and the Queen's Plate. Northern Dancer was retired after the 1964 racing season and started a career at stud. The National Thoroughbred Racing Association states that Northern Dancer is "one of the most influential sires in Thoroughbred history," and the Daily Racing Form calls Northern Dancer the most influential sire of the 20th century. Northern Dancer is also regarded as the 20th century's best sire of sires.

Led by Northern Dancer, in the 1960s, Windfields Farm earned more prize money than any other stable in North American Thoroughbred racing. Windfields bred Northern Dancer's sons Nijinsky, Secreto, and The Minstrel, all of whom won England's most prestigious race, The Derby.

In 1968 a barn fire at the Maryland division resulted in the death of thirteen horses who had just arrived from the Canadian farm. Included in the horses that died were twelve mares, three of which were in foal to Northern Dancer and one to Nearctic.

Northern Dancer spent most of his years at stud at the Maryland division which also became home to other sires such as Dancer's Image and Assert. A national icon in Canada, Northern Dancer died in 1990 at Windfields' Maryland farm but was returned to his birthplace in Oshawa for burial.

=== $1 million stud fee and world record offspring prices ===
Between 1974 and 1988, twelve times Northern Dancer yearlings led the Keeneland July Selected Yearling Sale by average price. In the 1983 Keeneland Sales horse auction, one of Windfields' colts, that would eventually be named Snaafi Dancer, became the first $10 million yearling. In 1984 his twelve yearlings sold for an unrivalled sale-record average of price of US$3,446.666.

In the 1980s, Northern Dancer's stud fee reached US$1 million, an amount four to five times his rivals and a record amount that as at 2009 has not been equalled.

Horses owned by Windfields Farm have won eleven Queen's Plate races, as well as the Kentucky Derby and Preakness Stakes. Their horses have won the Canadian Triple Crown of Thoroughbred Racing twice, in 1959 and 1963. Windfields Farm and/or E. P. Taylor bred a world-record 48 champions and 360 stakes winners.
