= Nitrogen (horse) =

American racehorse

- Sire: Medaglia d'Oro
- Grandsire: El Prado
- Dam: Tiffany Case
- Sex: Filly
- Foaled: March 6, 2022
- Country: United States
- Color: Bay
- Breeder: D J Stable
- Owner: D J Stable
- Trainer: Mark E. Casse
- Record: 17: 8–6–3
- Earnings: US$2,930,854

Major wins
- Florida Oaks (2025); Appalachian Stakes (2025); Edgewood Stakes (2025); Wonder Again Stakes (2025); Alabama Stakes (2025); Bayakoa Stakes (2026); Ogden Phipps Stakes (2026); Beldame Stakes (2026); Breeders' Cup Distaff (2026)

Awards
- Canadian Champion Two-Year-Old Filly (2024); American Champion Three-Year-Old Filly (2025)
- Last updated on August 9, 2026

Nitrogen (foaled March 6, 2022) is an American Grade I winning Thoroughbred racehorse and Eclipse Champion who won the prestigious Grade I Alabama Stakes at Saratoga Race Course.

== Background ==
Nitrogen is a bay filly bred and owned by D. J. Stable. Her sire is Medaglia d'Oro and her dam is Tiffany Case who was sired by Uncle Mo.

Nitrogen's sire is Medaglia d'Oro who at the age of 26 stands at Godolphin's Darley Stud in Lexington, Kentucky for $75,000 in 2025.

Nitrogen is trained by the Canadian Horse Racing Hall Of Fame trainer Mark E. Casse.

Nitrogen was named Canadian Champion Two-Year-Old Filly by a 114–62 margin over Souper Supreme as a maiden after her two Grade 1 performances in 2024.

== Statistics ==
Date	Distance	Race	Grade	Track	Odds	Field	Finish	Winning Time	Winning (Losing) Margin	Jockey	Ref
2024 – Two-year-old season
Aug 30, 2024	1 mile	Maiden Special Weight		Woodbine	0.70*	6	2	1:39.11	(neck)	Sahin Civaci	
Sep 14, 2024	1 mile	Natalma Stakes	I	Woodbine	41.35	11	3	1:33.99	(3/4 length)	Sahin Civaci	
Nov 1, 2024	1 mile	Breeders' Cup Juvenile Fillies Turf	I	Del Mar	49.60	14	3	1:34.28	(2 1/2 lengths)	José L. Ortiz	
2025 – Three-year-old season
Jan 4, 2025	1 mile	Ginger Brew Stakes	Listed	Gulfstream Park	1.80*	10	1	1:34.53	1/2 length	José L. Ortiz	
Mar 8, 2025	1 1/16 miles	Florida Oaks	III	Tampa Bay Downs	1.50*	11	1	1:40.42	1/2 length	José L. Ortiz	
Apr 8, 2025	1 mile	Appalachian Stakes	II	Keeneland	1.20*	7	1	1:37.00	2 1/4 lengths	José L. Ortiz	
May 2, 2025	1 1/16 miles	Edgewood Stakes	II	Churchill Downs	0.97*	7	1	1:41.58	3 1/2 lengths	José L. Ortiz	
Jun 7, 2025	1 mile	Wonder Again Stakes (Note: The Wonder Again Stakes was originally scheduled for 1 1/16 miles on the Inner turf course but was moved to the dirt track due to the rain affected track. Consequently, the event was downgraded to Grade III)	III	Saratoga	0.40*	3	1	1:36.16	17 lengths	José L. Ortiz	
Jul 5, 2025	1 1/8 miles	Belmont Oaks	I	Saratoga	0.40*	7	2	1:44.84 (Note: The winner Fionn set a new track record for the 1 1/8 miles distance)	(nose)	José L. Ortiz	
Aug 16, 2025	1 1/4 miles	Alabama Stakes	I	Saratoga	2.05	6	1	2:03.31	1 1/2 lengths	José L. Ortiz	
Oct 5, 2025	1 1/8 miles	Spinster Stakes	I	Keeneland	2.10	5	2	1:49.77	(head)	José L. Ortiz	
Nov 1, 2025	1 1/8 miles	Breeders' Cup Distaff	I	Del Mar	3.70	12	2	1:48.07	(5 1/2 lengths)	José L. Ortiz	
2026 – Four-year-old season
Feb 7, 2026	1 1/16 miles	Bayakoa Stakes	III	Oaklawn Park	0.30*	6	1	1:43.53	2 3/4 lengths	José L. Ortiz	
Mar 7, 2026	1 1/16 miles	Azeri Stakes	II	Oaklawn Park	0.30*	7	3	1:43.36	(1 3/4 lengths)	José L. Ortiz	
Apr 11, 2026	1 1/16 miles	Apple Blossom Handicap	I	Oaklawn Park	0.80*	9	2	1:42.21	(4 1/2 lengths)	José L. Ortiz	
Jun 5, 2026	1 1/8 miles	Ogden Phipps Stakes	I	Saratoga	1.00*	6	1	1:46.93	12 3/4 lengths	José L. Ortiz	
Aug 8, 2026	1 1/8 miles	Whitney Stakes	I	Saratoga	5.83	7	2	1:47.91	(4 3/4 lengths)	John Velazquez	
Sep 25, 2026	1 1/8 miles	Beldame Stakes	II	Belmont Park	2.10*	5	1	1:48:36	2 3/4 lengths	José L. Ortiz	
Oct 31, 2026	1 1/8 miles	Breeders' Cup Distaff	I	Keeneland	0.79*	7	1	1:48.90	2 1/4 lengths	José L. Ortiz	

Legend:
All-weather track Dirt Turf

Notes:
An asterisk after the odds means Nitrogen was the post-time favourite.

== Pedigree ==
Pedigree of Nitrogen, bay filly, foaled March 6, 2022
Sire Medaglia d'Oro (1999)	El Prado (IRE) (1989)	Sadler's Wells (1981)	Northern Dancer (1961)
Sire Medaglia d'Oro (1999)	El Prado (IRE) (1989)	Sadler's Wells (1981)	Fairy Bridge (1975)
Sire Medaglia d'Oro (1999)	El Prado (IRE) (1989)	Lady Capulet (1974)	Sir Ivor (1965)
Sire Medaglia d'Oro (1999)	El Prado (IRE) (1989)	Lady Capulet (1974)	Cap and Bells (1958)
Sire Medaglia d'Oro (1999)	Cappucino Bay (1989)	Bailjumper (1974)	Damascus (1964)
Sire Medaglia d'Oro (1999)	Cappucino Bay (1989)	Bailjumper (1974)	Court Circuit (1964)
Sire Medaglia d'Oro (1999)	Cappucino Bay (1989)	Dubbed In (1973)	Silent Screen (1967)
Sire Medaglia d'Oro (1999)	Cappucino Bay (1989)	Dubbed In (1973)	Society Singer (1968)
Dam Tiffany Case (2013)	Uncle Mo (2008)	Indian Charlie (1995)	In Excess (IRE) (1987)
Dam Tiffany Case (2013)	Uncle Mo (2008)	Indian Charlie (1995)	Soviet Sojourn (1989)
Dam Tiffany Case (2013)	Uncle Mo (2008)	Playa Maya (2000)	Arch (1995)
Dam Tiffany Case (2013)	Uncle Mo (2008)	Playa Maya (2000)	Dixie Slippers (1995)
Dam Tiffany Case (2013)	Biblical Point (2003)	Point Given (1998)	Thunder Gulch (1992)
Dam Tiffany Case (2013)	Biblical Point (2003)	Point Given (1998)	Turko's Turn(1986)
Dam Tiffany Case (2013)	Biblical Point (2003)	Bibical Sense (1990)	Blushing Groom (FR) (1974)
Dam Tiffany Case (2013)	Biblical Point (2003)	Bibical Sense (1990)	Star in the North (1971) (family: 1-s)
