= British Idiom =

American racehorse

- Sire: Flashback
- Grandsire: Tapit
- Dam: Rose and Shine
- Damsire: Mr. Sekiguchi
- Sex: Filly
- Foaled: 23 March 2017
- Died: 1 October 2021 (aged 4)
- Country: United States
- Color: Chestnut
- Breeder: Hargus Sexton, Sandra Sexton, Silver Fern Farm
- Owner: Michael Dubb, Elkstone Group, Madaket Stables, Bethlehem Stables
- Trainer: Brad H. Cox
- Record: 5: 3-1-0
- Earnings: $1,442,139

Major wins
- Alcibiades Stakes (2019) Breeders' Cup wins: Breeders' Cup Juvenile Fillies (2019)

Awards
- American Champion Two-Year-Old Filly (2019)
- Last updated on 11 October 2023

British Idiom (March 23, 2017 – October 1, 2021) was an American Thoroughbred racehorse who won the Alcibiades Stakes and Breeders' Cup Juvenile Fillies in 2019, earning the title of Champion Two-Year-Old Filly for the year.

== Background ==
British Idiom is a chestnut filly who was bred in Kentucky by Hargus Sexton, Sandra Sexton and Silver Fern Farm. She is the first graded stakes winner for her sire Flashback, a stakes-winning son of leading sire Tapit. Her dam Rose and Shine was a stakes winner in Canada.

British Idiom was sold for $40,000 at the Fasig-Tipton 2018 Yearling Sale. Her new owners, Michael Dubb, The Elkstone Group, Madaket Stables and Bethlehem Stables, sent her into training with Brad Cox. The same partnership campaigned Monomoy Girl, the champion three-year-old filly of 2018.

Stuart Grant, one of her co-owners, said her name was inspired by some British friends of his. "Who doesn't love a great British Idiom?" he said.

== Racing career ==
British Idiom made her first start on August 15, 2019, at Saratoga in a maiden special weight race for horses that had been sold for $45,000 or less. She challenged the early pace and then edged away during the stretch to win by 3 1/2 lengths.

She made her stakes debut in the Alcibiades Stakes at Keeneland on October 4. She rated in third behind the early pace set by Spitefulness while racing four wide, then made her move on the far turn. She drew away in the stretch for a 6 1/2 length victory.

That win earned her an automatic berth in the Breeders' Cup Juvenile Fillies, held on November 1 at Santa Anita Park. She broke slowly and was bumped as the horses entered the first turn. She then settled while saving ground on the rail down the backstretch. On the far turn, she shifted to the outside and started closing ground. She gradually made up ground on Donna Veloce, and the two battled for the final furlong with British Idiom prevailing by a neck.

"It was pretty rough in the first turn," said jockey Javier Castellano. "That was not the idea. The idea was a clear trip and stalking a little bit early. Unfortunately, that's the way it developed into the first turn. I took it from there and was very patient and confident because I had the best horse in the race. That's what she proved in the last part of the running."

According to Jay Privman of the Daily Racing Form, the win will "undoubtedly" make British Idiom the Champion Two-Year-Old Filly of 2019.

== Retirement ==
After finishing unplaced in the 2020 Fantasy Stakes, it was revealed that British Idiom had sustained an injury to her right-front ankle. She was sold to Northern Farm in Japan to commence her broodmare career.

It was reported in early 2022 that British Idiom had died at Northern Farm on the 1 October 2021. No cause of death was mentioned however she was in foal at the time to Japanese stallion Duramente.

== Statistics ==
Date	Distance	Race	Grade	Track	Odds	Field	Finish	Winning Time	Winning (Losing) Margin	Jockey	Ref
2019 – Two-year-old season
Aug 15, 2019	6 furlongs	Maiden Special Weight		Saratoga	3.50*	10	1	1:10.01	3 1/2 lengths	Javier Castellano	
Oct 4, 2019	1 1/16 miles	Alcibiades Stakes	I	Keeneland	3.60	11	1	1:45.80	6 1/2 lengths	Javier Castellano	
Nov 1, 2019	1 1/16 miles	Breeders' Cup Juvenile Fillies	I	Santa Anita	2.70	9	1	1:47.07	neck	Javier Castellano	
2020 – Three-year-old season
Feb 15, 2020	1 1/16 miles	Rachel Alexandra Stakes	II	Fair Grounds	0.90*	7	2	1:43.97	(4 3/4 lengths)	Javier Castellano	
May 1, 2020	1 1/16 miles	Fantasy Stakes	III	Oaklawn Park	4.20	14	10	1:42.00	(19 lengths)	Javier Castellano	

An asterisk after the odds means British Idiom was the post-time favorite.

== Pedigree ==
Pedigree of British Idiom, filly, March 23, 2017
Sire Flashback 2010	Tapit; 2001	Pulpit	A.P. Indy
Sire Flashback 2010	Tapit; 2001	Pulpit	Preach
Sire Flashback 2010	Tapit; 2001	Tap Your Heels	Unbridled
Sire Flashback 2010	Tapit; 2001	Tap Your Heels	Ruby Slippers
Sire Flashback 2010	Rhumb Line; 2000	Mr. Greeley	Gone West
Sire Flashback 2010	Rhumb Line; 2000	Mr. Greeley	Long Legend
Sire Flashback 2010	Rhumb Line; 2000	Rose Rhapsody	Pleasant Colony
Sire Flashback 2010	Rhumb Line; 2000	Rose Rhapsody	Rosy Spectre
Dam Rose and Shine 2009	Mr. Sekiguchi; 2003	Storm Cat	Storm Bird
Dam Rose and Shine 2009	Mr. Sekiguchi; 2003	Storm Cat	Terlingua
Dam Rose and Shine 2009	Mr. Sekiguchi; 2003	Welcome Surprise	Seeking the Gold
Dam Rose and Shine 2009	Mr. Sekiguchi; 2003	Welcome Surprise	Weekend Surprise
Dam Rose and Shine 2009	Yellowenglishrose; 1996	Colonial Affair	Pleasant Colony
Dam Rose and Shine 2009	Yellowenglishrose; 1996	Colonial Affair	Snuggle
Dam Rose and Shine 2009	Yellowenglishrose; 1996	Princess Baja	Conquistador Cielo
Dam Rose and Shine 2009	Yellowenglishrose; 1996	Princess Baja	Miss Baja (family: 23-b)

British Idiom is inbred 4 × 4 to Pleasant Colony, meaning this stallion appears twice in the fourth generation of her pedigree.
