= Phoenix Towers (China) =

Proposed skyscrapers in Wuhan, China

Coordinates: 30.5667°N 114.2670°E

- 鳳凰塔
- Interactive map of the Phoenix Towers area

General information
- Status: Proposed
- Type: Tower
- Location: Wuhan, China
- Groundbreaking: 2026
- Construction started: April 19, 2027
- Cost: £1.2 billion
- Owner: Huang Family based in Taiwan, China and the US.

Height
- Height: 1 kilometre (3,300 ft)

Technical details
- Grounds: 7 hectares (17 acres)

Design and construction
- Architecture firm: Chetwoods Architects

The Phoenix Towers (Chinese: 凤凰塔; pinyin: Fènghuángtǎ) are proposed supertall skyscrapers planned for construction in Wuhan, China.

At 1 kilometre (3,300 ft) high, the towers will be the second tallest structure in the world when completed. The towers are being designed by Chetwoods Architects. Completion was planned for by the end of 2018 at a cost of £1.2 billion. As of March 2026, construction has not started.

== Description ==
The Phoenix Towers are being designed by London-based Chetwoods Architects in partnership with the HuangYan Group. The project will consist of two buildings, representing the male and female dualistic aspects of Chinese culture. The taller tower, Feng, will have about 100 floors for residential living, offices and retail space. The slightly smaller Huang tower, named after the family, will contain "the world's tallest garden", proposed by the Huangs. The towers will be constructed on an island in a lake, covering a 7-hectare (17-acre) site.

The buildings will be constructed on a steel superstructure with concrete cores and buttresses. The exterior will be covered in solar panels.

The towers will incorporate green energy technologies including wind, solar, thermal, biomass boilers and hydrogen fuel cells.
