= Secreto =

American-bred Thoroughbred racehorse (1981–1999)

- Racing silks of Luigi Miglietti
- Sire: Northern Dancer
- Grandsire: Nearctic
- Dam: Betty's Secret
- Damsire: Secretariat
- Sex: Stallion
- Foaled: 12 February 1981
- Country: United States
- Colour: Bay
- Breeder: E. P. Taylor
- Owner: Luigi Miglietti
- Trainer: David O'Brien
- Record: 4: 3-0-1
- Earnings: $326,537 (in UK)

Major wins
- Tetrarch Stakes (1984); Epsom Derby (1984); Timeform rating: 128
- Last updated on 3 November 2022

Secreto (1981–1999) was an American-bred, Irish-trained Thoroughbred racehorse and sire. In a career that consisted of only four races, he won three times. His most important success came in June 1984 when he won the Derby.

== Background ==
Secreto was a small bay horse with three white socks sired by Northern Dancer. He was the first foal of his dam, the unraced Secretariat mare Betty's Secret, who was only three years old when Secreto was conceived. Betty's Secret went on to produce Istabraq, who won the Champion Hurdle at Cheltenham's National Hunt Festival in 1998, 1999 and 2000. Secreto was bred by E. P. Taylor at his Windfields Farm (Maryland). As a yearling in 1982, Secreto was sent to the Keeneland Select yearling sale where he was sold for $340,000, a below-average figure for a Northern Dancer horse. The purchaser was the Venezuelan breeder Luigi Miglietti who sent his colt to be trained in Ireland by David O'Brien.

== Racing career ==
Secreto won his only race as a two-year-old, taking a small maiden race at Phoenix Park. In the spring of 1984, he won the Tetrarch Stakes and then started favourite for the Irish 2,000 Guineas over one mile. He finished third, beaten a neck and half a length by Sadler's Wells and Procida, giving the impression that he would be suited by a longer distance.

In the 1984 Derby, which, was the most valuable race ever run in Europe with a first prize of £227,680, Secreto started at odds of 14/1 in a field of seventeen runners. The odds-on favourite was the unbeaten El Gran Senor, trained by David O'Briens's father Vincent. El Gran Senor had been the leading European two-year-old of 1983 and had won the 2000 Guineas. The running was made by future Melbourne Cup winner At Talaq, who turned into the straight five lengths clear. Two furlongs from the finish, El Gran Senor moved up to dispute the lead with Secreto moving up to challenge on the outside. Pat Eddery appeared to be going very easily on the favourite, whereas Christy Roche was hard at work on Secreto. The two Irish-trained colts began to pull away from the opposition and in what Timeform described as a "thrilling" finish, Secreto led in the last strides to win by a short head. The result was only confirmed after the stewards rejected an objection lodged by Eddery, who claimed that Secreto had leaned in and interfered with his horse in the closing stages. Secreto's win made David O'Brien, at 27, the youngest man to train a Derby winner. Christy Roche praised the colt's attitude, saying that Secreto had "won on sheer courage."

After his win in the Derby, a half share in Secreto was sold to Calumet Farm for a reported $20,000,000. The colt never ran again, being withdrawn successively from the Irish Derby, the King George VI and Queen Elizabeth Stakes and the Benson & Hedges Gold Cup.

== Assessment ==
Secreto was assessed at 128 by Timeform. In their book A Century of Champions, John Randall and Tony Morris rated Secreto as an "inferior" Derby winner.

== Stud record ==
Secreto was retired to stud at Calumet Farm in Kentucky before being sent to Japan in 1992 where he died in 1999. His most notable offspring was the 1991 English 2,000 Guineas winner Mystiko. The most notable of his Japanese runners was the Hanshin Juvenile Fillies winner Tamuro Cherry.

== Pedigree ==
Pedigree of Secreto
Sire Northern Dancer	Nearctic	Nearco	Pharos
Sire Northern Dancer	Nearctic	Nearco	Nogara
Sire Northern Dancer	Nearctic	Lady Angela	Hyperion
Sire Northern Dancer	Nearctic	Lady Angela	Sister Sarah
Sire Northern Dancer	Natalma	Native Dancer	Polynesian
Sire Northern Dancer	Natalma	Native Dancer	Geisha
Sire Northern Dancer	Natalma	Almahmoud	Mahmoud
Sire Northern Dancer	Natalma	Almahmoud	Arbitrator
Dam Betty's Secret	Secretariat	Bold Ruler	Nasrullah
Dam Betty's Secret	Secretariat	Bold Ruler	Miss Disco
Dam Betty's Secret	Secretariat	Somethingroyal	Princequillo
Dam Betty's Secret	Secretariat	Somethingroyal	Imperatrice
Dam Betty's Secret	Betty Loraine	Prince John	Princequillo
Dam Betty's Secret	Betty Loraine	Prince John	Not Afraid
Dam Betty's Secret	Betty Loraine	Gay Hostess	Royal Charger
Dam Betty's Secret	Betty Loraine	Gay Hostess	Your Hostess
