= Sol Kumin =

American businessman and racehorse owner

Personal information
- Born: 13 May 1975 (age 51) Boston, Massachusetts, United States
- Occupation: Co-President

Horse racing career
- Sport: Horse racing

Major racing wins
- Breeders' Cup Juvenile Fillies Turf (2014), Diamond Jubilee Stakes (2015), Preakness Stakes (2016), Kentucky Derby (2018, 2020), Preakness Stakes (2018), Belmont Stakes (2018), Kentucky Oats(2018), Travers Stakes (2018), Breeders' Cup Juvenile Fillies (2019), Breeders' Cup Mile (2019), Breeders' Cup Classic (2020), Breeders' Cup Sprint (2020), Breeders' Cup Juvenile Filly's Turf (2020), Preakness Stakes (2023), Pegasus World Cup Invitational (2024), Breeders' Cup Juvenile (2024), Pegasus World Cup Turf (2025)

Racing awards
- New Owner of the Year for the United States (2015)

Significant horses
- Justify, Monomoy Girl, Lady Eli, Exaggerator, Mind Your Biscuits, British Idiom, Authentic, Midnight Bisou, National Treasure, Citizen Bull

Sol Kumin (born 13 May 1975) is an American business leader, Thoroughbred racehorse owner and philanthropist. In May 2018, he became the first owner since 1952 to have both a Kentucky Oaks and a Kentucky Derby winner in the same weekend. He was a co-owner of Justify; winner of the Triple Crown. In Kumin's first decade of horseracing, through his horses at Madaket Stables, he won 92 Grade One races, 12 Breeders Cups, the Preakness Stakes three times and the Kentucky Derby twice.

== Early life ==
The oldest of three siblings, Kumin grew up in Worcester, Massachusetts before moving to Boston at the age of 10. He was educated at the Fessenden School before attending St. Paul's School in Concord, New Hampshire. He went on to gain a BA in political science from Johns Hopkins University.

== Business career ==
Kumin worked at Lazard Asset Management and Sanford Bernstein before joining SAC Capital, where his roles included Head of Business Development and subsequently Chief Operating Officer under Steve A. Cohen. Upon Kumin leaving in 2014, Cohen went on to say that Kumin had "been responsible for transforming our business development and investor relations functions and has helped create our global strategy and footprint. Without his tireless work, we would not have had a strong London presence or our current business in Asia."

After leaving SAC Capital in January 2014, Kumin started hedge fund Folger Hill Asset Management with over $1 billion from investors including $400 million backing from Leucadia National Corp. Kumin named the hedge fund after a hill of the same name on Nantucket where he has a summer home. He does not invest his own money, but has instead grown a reputation for identifying and recruiting talented traders.

In April 2018 Kumin announced that following a merger of Folger Hill and Schonfeld Strategic Advisors, he would take up a new role of Chief Strategic Officer at Leucadia Asset Management, LLC in September 2018. As of January 2020, Kumin had been promoted to the position of co-president at Leucadia Asset Management.

== Horse racing ==
Specializing in buying proven established horses, Kumin has (and has had) a stake in a number of active and retired racehorses including Justify, Exaggerator, Lady Eli and Wavell Avenue and has been given credit for having "revolutionized the partnership concept." In addition to purchasing stakes in proven racehorses, Kumin has also repeatedly invested in yearlings such as Monomoy Girl and Lady Eli.

Kumin is involved in a number of stables and ownership groups including Head of Plains Partners LLC, Madaket Stables, Monomoy Stables, and Sheep Pond Partners. Kumin and his partners usually own around 100 horses at any given time; around 70–75% are fillies.

In a 2024 interview with Maxim magazine, Kumin commented that horse racing "has been a really, really good thing for my dad. He’s 82, and it’s given him a new lease on life."

=== 2014 to 2016 – Lady Eli, Exaggerator and New Owner of the Year ===
Despite attending his first race while at college Kumin didn't get into horse-racing until much later through close friend Jay Hanley; the pair now comprising ownership group Sheep Pond Partners along with two other friends.

After buying his first horse in 2014, Kumin's first high-profile winner was Lady Eli; purchased that same year. Named after his wife Elizabeth, Lady Eli won the Breeders' Cup Juvenile Fillies Turf in 2014 and then went on to claim six straight wins before being struck down with laminitis after stepping on a nail.

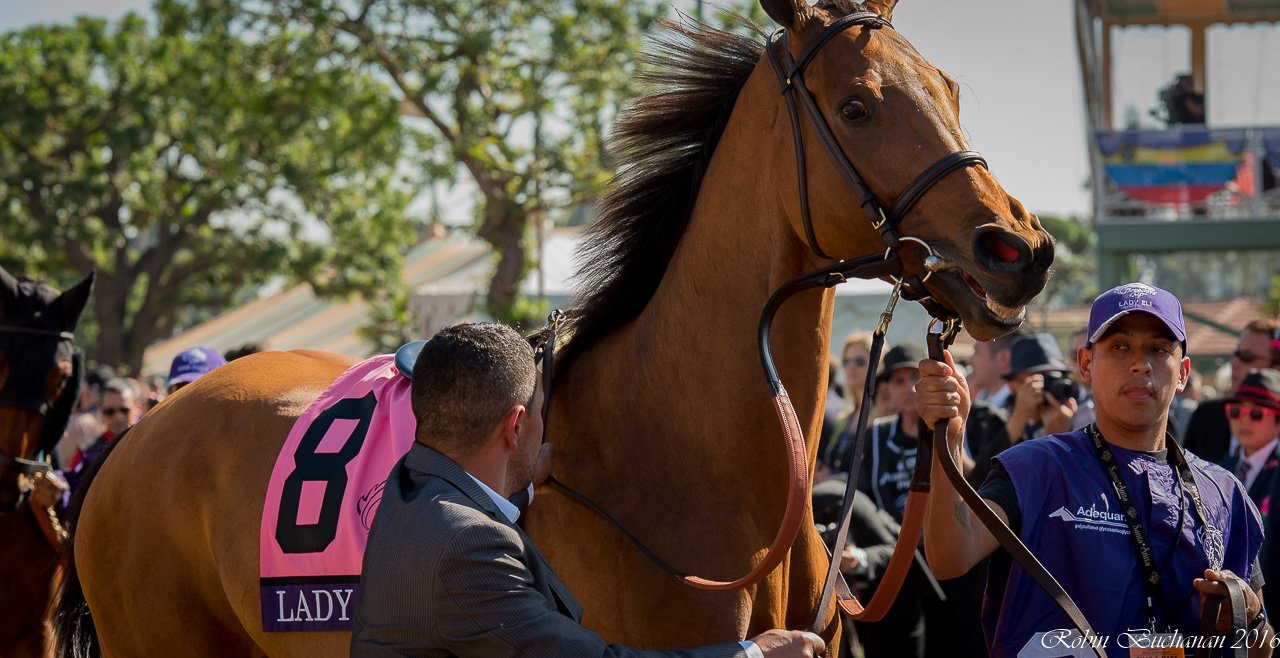
Lady Eli before the Breeders' Cup, 2016

In 2015, Kumin's Undrafted, which he co-owns with former American football wide receiver Wes Welker, won the Diamond Jubilee Stakes at Royal Ascot. Of Ascot, Kumin commented "It's an incredible place to win. When you stop and look around, the tradition and just the whole scene is different than anywhere in the world."

In 2016, Kumin bought a stake in the double Stakes winner Exaggerator in 2016 along with partners including Big Chief Racing and Ron Ortowski. Later that year Kumin was celebrating winning the Preakness Stakes; one of the Triple Crown Races.

Kumin had been in the sport for less than a year when he was crowned New Owner of the Year for the United States for 2015 at the Thoroughbred Owner Conference in Florida in January 2016.

=== 2016 to 2018 – Justify and the Triple Crown ===
At the Arlington Million in Chicago in August 2017, Kumin had two successes with Beach Patrol winning the Arlington Million, and Dacita winning the Beverly D. Stakes. He went on to say he "had an unbelievable day" and that the Million was "the race we've been waiting for a year." Following his horses' performances through the year, Kumin finished fourth in the 2017 Eclipse Award behind Juddmonte Farms, Winchell Thoroughbreds and Godolphin Racing.

In March 2018, Kumin bought stakes in two Kentucky Derby contenders; Audible and Justify. After My Boy Jack won the Lexington Stakes and gained 20 qualification points, this would mean that Kumin had three runners in the 2018 Derby.

Justify would go on to win the race, with Audible finishing third and My Boy Jack fifth. This topped off a successful two days for Kumin after another of his horses; Monomoy Girl won the Kentucky Oaks the same weekend. With two wins, Kumin became the first owner to achieve the Derby-Oaks double in 66 years. Topping off the weekend was another of his horses Yoshida who was victorious in the Old Forester Turf Classic. Of the weekend, Kumin commented "It was a ridiculous weekend. We had two awesome days with the Derby/Oaks weekend and winning three grade ones."

Later that month, Justify landed another victory at the Preakness Stakes meaning it had won two of the three Triple Crown races with the third to be decided the following month at the Belmont Stakes. The win meant that Kumin's horses had won the Preakness Stakes in two out of three years. Justify then went on to win the Belmont Stakes, and thus became the 13th Triple Crown winner.

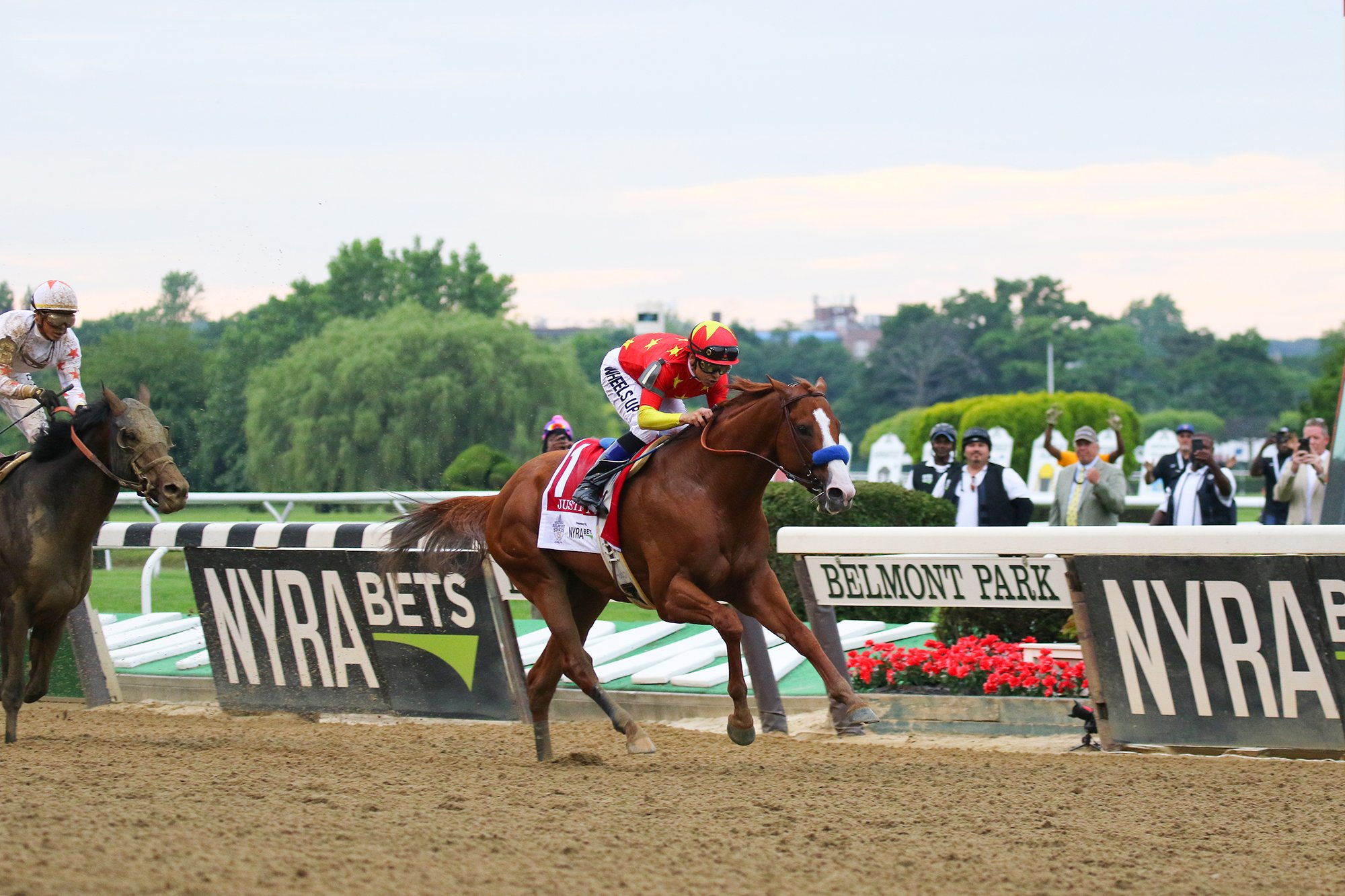
Justify wins the Belmont Stakes.

In August 2018, Kumin's horse Catholic Boy won the Travers Stakes in Saratoga Springs, New York. Of the win, Kumin said "The Travers was a bucket list race for me."

In November 2018, Monomoy Girl would follow her Kentucky Oaks' win with victory in the Breeders' Cup Distaff. The following month, Uni took Kumin's Grade 1 wins in 2018 to 24 when it won the Matriarch Stakes at Del Mar Fairgrounds. Kumin would finish 2018 with 74 graded wins in total. Of Kumin's 2018, Bob Ehalt wrote that the year was "remarkable" and had "unprecedented accomplishments".

At the end of October 2018, Lady Eli was sold at auction to Hill 'n' Dale Farms for $4.2million as a broodmare. She was carrying her first foal at the time of sale. The next month saw another of Kumin's highest profile horses leave his roster when Mind Your Biscuits retired, with Shadai Farm in Japan taking full ownership.

=== 2019 to 2021 – Further wins and Eclipse Award success ===
Kumin's 2019 started well when Coal Front won the $1.5million Godolphin Mile in Dubai. This was the third straight year that he had won a million-dollar graded stakes on the Dubai World Cup card. The Dubai victory was followed by a win for Midnight Bisou at the $750,000 Grade 1 Apple Blossom Handicap at Oaklawn Park.

After owning winners of the two out of the four previous Preakness Stakes in Exaggerator and Justify, Kumin would claim a fourth place in 2019 when Warrior's Charge faded in the home stretch.

In August, two of Kumin's horse would claim Grade 1 wins with Midnight Bisou claiming victory in the Personal Ensign Stakes and Mind Control taking first place in the H. Allen Jerkens Memorial Stakes.

In early November, Kumin would take a number of horses to the Breeders Cup at Santa Anita Park, California. There were two wins over the weekend for British Idiom in the Breeders' Cup Juvenile Fillies, and for Uni in the Breeders' Cup Mile. There were also places for Midnight Bisou, Shekky Shebaz, and Whitmore.

Kumin started 2020 with three of his horses winning their respective categories at the 2019 Eclipse Awards. These included Uni being named Female Turf Horse of the Year, British Idiom claiming the Two-Year-Old Filly award and Midnight Bisou victorious in the Older Dirt Female category. Kumin also saw victories for his two of his horses in February and March when Mr Monomoy won the $400,000 Risen Star Stakes (G2) at Fair Grounds Race Course, and Whitmore won the $147,000 Hot Springs Stakes for the fourth consecutive year. Later in March, Kumin's Wells Bayou scored a front-running win in the $1 million Louisiana Derby (G2) at Fair Grounds Race Course. Further wins would follow in April and May for Whitmore in the Count Fleet Sprint Handicap, and Charlatan in the Arkansas Derby. Kumin had two more notable wins in June and July when She's a Julie was victorious in the G1 Ogden Phipps Stakes, and Monomoy Girl won the G2 Ruffian Stakes.

2020 also saw wins for another Kumin owned horse when Authentic won the Kentucky Derby and Breeders Cup. These wins along with a second place at the Preakness Stakes and a number of other wins resulted in Kumin's Madaket Stables finishing the year as leading owners (for North American earnings) in an ownership group with Spendthrift Farm, MyRaceHorse Stable and Starlight Racing.

At the 2020 Eclipse Awards (announced in 2021), three of Kumin's horses were successful; Whitmore (Male Sprinter), Authentic (Horse of the Year / 3 Year Old Male), and Monomoy Girl (Older Dirt Female). The Authentic ownership group (of which Kumin's Madaket Stables is part) came second in the Best Owner category to Godolphin LLC.

=== Individual horses ===
Kumin has owned a number of high-profile horses with major wins including:

- Authentic - winner of 2020 Kentucky Derby and Breeders' Cup Classic.
- Exaggerator – winner of the 2016 Preakness Stakes before retiring later in the year. Now a breeding stallion at Winstar Farm.
- Justify – the thirteenth American Triple Crown winner and American Horse of the Year in 2018.
- Lady Eli – American Champion Female Turf Horse of 2017 who won six out of six starts before stepping on a nail and contracting laminitis.
- Monomoy Girl – winner of the Breeders' Cup Distaff and Kentucky Oaks; the filly equivalent of the Kentucky derby.
- Mind Your Biscuits – twice-winner of the Dubai Golden Shaheen and the highest earning New-York Bred of all time.
- Two Phil's - second-place finisher of the 2023 Kentucky Derby
- National Treasure - winner of 2023 Preakness Stakes and 2024 Pegasus World Cup Invitational
- Midnight Bisou - Champion Older Female Horse in 2019.
- Citizen Bull - winner of 2024 Breeders Cup Juvenile
- Spirit of St Louis – winner of 2024 Pegasus World Cup Turf

Some of Kumin's other top horses (past and present) include:

- A Raving Beauty
- Audible
- Aunt Pearl
- Beach Patrol
- British Idiom
- Catholic Boy
- Charlatan
- Coal Front
- Dacita
- Fatale Bere
- Fluffy Socks
- Jimmy P
- Mr Monomoy
- Rymska
- Undrafted
- Uni
- Warrior's Charge
- Wavell Avenue
- Well's Bayou
- Whitmore
- World of Trouble
- Ya Primo
- Yoshida

== Lacrosse ==
Kumin played Lacrosse for Johns Hopkins University in attack, is the vice chair of the US Lacrosse Foundation board and an investor in the Premier Lacrosse League. He remains involved in Johns Hopkins lacrosse and sits on the Lacrosse Advisory Board as Fundraising Committee Chair. In February 2021, The National Lacrosse League (NLL), announced the sale of New England Black Wolves to an ownership group including Kumin, Oliver Marti and Brett Jefferson. The Wolves will be relocated to Albany, New York.

== Personal life ==
Kumin is married to Elizabeth Kumin. They have two sons, Jax and Sam, and one daughter, Corey.

His horses Lady Eli and My Man Sam are named after his wife and son respectively, and his horse Fluffy Socks was named by the latter.

Outside of horse-racing, Kumin supports the New England Patriots and Boston Red Sox teams.

Kumin sits on several other boards including Starwood Property Trust (STWD), Johns Hopkins University, Fessenden School, Thoroughbred Owners and Breeders Association, and the Trust Board at Boston Children's Hospital. He is also a board member of Team Impact; a non-profit organisation that connects children facing serious and chronic illnesses with college sports teams.

Kumin donates a percentage of each of his horses' Breeders' Cup earnings to the New Vocations racehorse adoption program.
