= Chester House =

American-bred Thoroughbred racehorse

- Sire: Mr. Prospector
- Grandsire: Raise a Native
- Dam: Toussaud
- Damsire: El Gran Senor
- Sex: Stallion
- Foaled: Feb 1 1995
- Country: United States
- Colour: Dark Bay / Brown
- Breeder: Juddmonte Farms
- Owner: Khalid Abdullah Abdulrahman Al-Saud/Juddmonte Farms
- Trainer: Henry Cecil; Bobby Frankel
- Record: 21: 6-4-4
- Earnings: $1,944,545

Major wins
- Steventon Stakes (1998); Brigadier Gerard Stakes (1999); Huxley Stakes (1999); Arlington Million Stakes (2000)
- Last updated on March 16, 2011

Chester House (February 1, 1995 – June 28, 2003) was an American-bred Thoroughbred racehorse and sire. In his racing career, he ran in both Europe and North America, winning six races, most notably the Arlington Million as a five-year-old in 2000. Following his retirement, he showed promise as a stallion before dying at the age of eight.

== Background ==
Chester House was a dark bay horse bred by his owner, Khalid Abdullah's Juddmonte Farms breeding operation. He was sired by Mr. Prospector and out of the El Gran Senor mare Toussaud and was his dam's first foal. Toussaud later produced Belmont Stakes winner Empire Maker. Chester House was sent to be trained in England by Henry Cecil at his Warren Place stable in Newmarket, Suffolk.

== Race career ==
Chester House started his record in England with a win in his first outing. He then won the class B Rosehill Stakes at Doncaster, the Listed Steventon Stakes at Newbury and the Listed Huxley Stakes at Chester. He recorded his first group race win in the Group Three Brigadier Gerard Stakes by five lengths. After about three showings in four more group races in England, his connections entered him in the 1999 Breeders' Cup Classic. Before the race, he was relocated to the United States to be trained by Robert Frankel. Chester House had no previous experience on dirt, stumbled at the start and was last for almost half of the race. He then made steady progress to finish fourth, less than three lengths behind the winner, Cat Thief. After the Classic, he remained in the United States to compete in turf races. After losing his first six starts, he won the Grade 1 Arlington Million by three lengths with Jerry Bailey riding. His connections then retired him and sent him to stud at the U.S. division of Juddmonte Farms.

== Stud career ==
Chester House showed promise as a sire of winners in a brief stud career. Most notable of his offspring in North America is the champion mare Ventura, who won the 2008 Breeders' Cup Filly & Mare Sprint and the 2009 Woodbine Mile against colts along with several other Grade 1 wins. Ventura earned over $2 million. Chester House had a second Breeders’ Cup winner in the colt Muhannak, who won the 2008 Breeders’ Cup Marathon and was a Grade 3 winner in Ireland. Chester House's other winners included grade 1 winner Divine Park; the multiple grade 2 winner Spring House (who raced for 5 seasons); grade 2 winner Warning Zone; and grade 3 winner Stonehouse, along with many more minor stakes winners. The best of his European runners was Phoenix Tower Standing at $25,000 for a guaranteed live foal, Chester House offered the Mr. Prospector blood line at a much lower price than similar stallions like Kingmambo or Fusaichi Pegasus.

== Death ==
In May 2003, Chester House's handlers noticed that he was not doing well. A vet visit showed he was anaemic and had contracted pneumonia. Further test showed these were secondary sicknesses as he had developed a type of cancer called Myelodysplastic Syndrome. Chemotherapy began at once in order to save his life, but the illness progressed so rapidly that Juddmonte Farms managers decided to euthanize the horse on June 28, 2003.
