= Toussaud =

American Thoroughbred racehorse

- Sire: El Gran Senor
- Grandsire: Northern Dancer
- Dam: Image of Reality
- Damsire: In Reality
- Sex: Mare
- Foaled: 1989
- Country: United States
- Colour: Bay
- Breeder: Juddmonte Farms
- Owner: Juddmonte Farms
- Trainer: Bobby Frankel
- Record: 15: 7-4-2
- Earnings: $552,751

Major wins
- Criterion Stakes (1992); American Handicap (1993); Gamely Stakes (1993); Wilshire Handicap (1993); Autumn Days Handicap (1993)

Awards
- Kentucky Broodmare of the Year (2002)
- Last updated on 5/11/2012

Toussaud (May 6, 1989 – January 5, 2009) was a bay mare bred and raced by Juddmonte Farms. Sired by El Gran Senor out of an, In Reality, mare, Image of Reality, Toussaud achieved much on the track and in the breeding shed.

== Race career ==
Toussaud raced in both Europe and the US, excelling on grass surfaces. At three she won against males in the Van Geest Criterion Stakes (Gr.3) in England and placed in both the Calor Silver Trophy and Fed Brew Lager Beeswing Stakes. At four, she was shipped across the pond and again won against the colts in the American Handicap (Gr.2). She then won the Gr.1 Gamely Breeders’ Cup Handicap (now just the Gamely Stakes). She also added the Wilshire Handicap (Gr.2) and the Autumn Days Handicap to her list of victories.

== Legacy ==
Toussaud was the dam of five graded stakes winners, including champion sires and Grade 1 winners Chester House and Empire Maker. All of her graded winners were sired by different stallions. The only stallion she ever re-visited was A. P. Indy, and neither of the two resulting foals ever raced. Honest Lady, Toussaud's second foal and third highest earner, was a grade 1 stakes winner and became the dam of a Grade 1 stakes winner, First Defence. Two more of Toussaud's get are Chiselling (Secretariat Stakes (Gr.1) winner) and Decarchy, who won the Gr.2 Frank E. Kilroe Mile Handicap. Decarchy had a modest stud career. Chiselling was to be sent to South Africa to stand stud duty for Andreas Jacobs and the Scott Brothers. Still, before the flight on July 30, he was diagnosed with the neurological disease Equine Protozoal Myeloencephalitis. Press releases stated that he would remain in Kentucky to receive treatment and would be shipped out at a later date to start preparing for his 2005 stud season. However, he seems to have never made it to South Africa and has no reported offspring.

Toussaud produced some non-champions as well, including her A. P. Indy fillies named Mesmeric and Gateway. Both fillies were retained by Juddmonte Farms and are in its broodmare band. Another of Toussaud's daughters a filly by Kingmambo, Tinge, also never set foot on the race track. Civilisation (by Gone West) is Toussaud's only foal to race but never win. Tolerance (by Seeking the Gold) won once in three starts before returning to Juddmonte Farms to become a broodmare like her other sisters.

== Death ==
Although Toussaud met with much success in the breeding shed, she was often ill and became too physically fragile to rear her own foals. In 1995, she developed laminitis after producing her first foal, Chester House, and five years later she underwent colic surgery to fix an impaction. Her propensity for illness seems to be another trait she passed on to her offspring, as both Chester House and Chiselling were struck with debilitating diseases, though neither sickness was genetically inherited. Toussaud was pensioned in late December 2007 due to her worsening laminitis.

Toussaud was euthanized in 2009 at the age of 20 due to declining health and complications from laminitis. “Mentally, she was as content and as happy of a mare as there was,” Juddmonte manager Garrett O’Rourke said. “Physically, she just started to wear down. She was 20 years of age, but she probably lived a few extra years [with the physical issues]. It gets to be a time when their physiques can’t stand up to it.” “She endured a lot in her life and just kept on pulling it out. To have health problems and still become a Broodmare of the Year, it’s quite amazing. To be around her, she always reminded me of one of those people that we all know in life that has misfortune and never complains. To me, that’s the most admirable type of person, and that’s exactly how she was. She was always the same Toussaud, every single morning, happy to see you.”
