= El Gran Senor =

American-bred Thoroughbred racehorse (1981–2006)

- Sire: Northern Dancer
- Grandsire: Nearctic
- Dam: Sex Appeal
- Damsire: Buckpasser
- Sex: Stallion
- Foaled: 21 April 1981
- Country: United States
- Colour: Bay
- Breeder: E. P. Taylor, Vincent O'Brien, John Magnier, Robert Sangster
- Owner: Robert Sangster
- Trainer: Vincent O'Brien
- Record: 8: 7-1-0
- Earnings: $502,969

Major wins
- Railway Stakes (1983); National Stakes (1983); Dewhurst Stakes (1983); Gladness Stakes (1984); 2,000 Guineas (1984); Irish Derby (1984)

Awards
- Timeform top-rated two-year-old colt (1983); Top-rated European two-year-old colt (1983); Timeform top-rated three-year-old colt (1984); Top-rated European three-year-old colt (1984); Timeform rating: 136 (1984)
- Last updated on 3 November 2023

El Gran Senor (21 April 1981 – 18 October 2006) was an American-bred, Irish-trained Thoroughbred race horse. Foaled at Windfields Farm (Maryland), he was the best horse of his generation in Europe at both two and three years of age. His only defeat in eight races came when he was beaten a short head by Secreto in the 1984 Epsom Derby. El Gran Senor received an outstanding Timeform rating of 136. He also enjoyed success at stud before being pensioned at Ashford Stud in Kentucky in 2000.

== Background ==
He was born in 1981 and was bred at Windfields Farm (Maryland) by Windfields' owner E. P. Taylor in partnership with Vincent O'Brien, John Magnier, and Robert Sangster. He had a pronounced parrot mouth, which he often passed on to his progeny. His name comes from the nickname of Horatio Luro, trainer of his sire Northern Dancer. He went to Ireland to be trained by Vincent O'Brien, who had trained numerous major winners for Sangster including El Gran Senor's full brother, Try My Best, who was champion two-year-old in Great Britain and Ireland in 1977.

== Racing career ==
The colt was unbeaten as a two-year-old. He won the Railway Stakes and National Stakes at the Curragh in Ireland. For his final race that year, he was sent to Newmarket in England for the Dewhurst Stakes, the most prestigious two-year-old race in that country. His defeat of Rainbow Quest earned him an unusually high two-year-old rating of 131 from Timeform.

As a three-year-old, El Gran Senor again raced four times before injury ended his season in mid-summer. He easily won the Gladness Stakes beating stablemate Sadler's Wells at the Curragh and then returned to Newmarket in England, where he competed in the 2,000 Guineas Stakes, the first Classic of the year. In one of the highest-quality runnings of the race El Gran Senor easily beat Chief Singer, Lear Fan and Rainbow Quest. Chief Singer franked the form by winning the St. James's Palace Stakes and Sussex Stakes over a mile and the July Cup over six furlongs. Lear Fan won the Prix Jacques le Marois over a mile at Deauville in France.

Despite some doubts over his stamina, stemming from the amount of speed in the distaff side of his pedigree and the speed he had shown at Newmarket, El Gran Senor was an odds-on favourite for the Derby (Gr1) over 12 furlongs at Epsom. In the stretch, he engaged in a battle with another Irish-trained colt Secreto, who had finished third in the Irish 2,000 Guineas to Sadler's Wells in his previous race, but lost narrowly. Many felt that Pat Eddery had ridden an ill-judged race, hitting the front too soon and not being able to use El Gran Senor's acceleration. Eddery later acknowledged that El Gran Senor should have won the race but that when the pacemakers dropped away early in the straight he found himself in the lead much earlier than intended. Both colts, trained by father and son (Vincent and David O'Brien), were sired by the same stallion, were bred at the same stud farm and, it has been reported, had shared a paddock as yearlings.

El Gran Senor went on to beat Rainbow Quest in the Irish Derby over 12 furlongs at the Curragh. He then sustained an injury (lameness due to a keratoma in his hoof) and was retired to stud in America.

== Stud career ==
Throughout his stud career, El Gran Senor had low fertility and typically sired no more than 40 foals in any single year - these days, most top sires and champions sire between 60 and 180 foals in a year. Over the course of his career, he fathered fewer than 400 foals. There were only 14 in his first foal-crop, but they included Al Hareb, who won the Racing Post Trophy (Gr1) over a mile in England. Al Hareb was at stud in Australia, and while his overall record was unremarkable, he did sire the top class sprinter Hareeba, a multiple Group 1 winning sprinter. El Gran Senor sired a total of 12 horses who won at the highest level (Group/Grade 1). These included King George VI and Queen Elizabeth Stakes winner Belmez, multiple European Group 1 winner Rodrigo de Triano, South African classic winner Kundalini, top American fillies Corrazona, Spanish Fern and Toussaud and Breeders' Cup Sprint hero Lit de Justice.

The horse was pensioned from stallion duty in 2000 at the age of 19. His final tally of 55 stakes winners represented a rate of more than 14% stakes winners to named foals: 10%+ is the usually accepted sign of a very good stallion. His record as a sire of broodmares was very good. His daughters produced over 60 stakes winners, including Grade/Group 1 winners Chester House, Chiselling, Emin Baja (CHI), Empire Maker, Grand Arch, Grand Vitesse (ARG), Honest Lady, Ice Horse (ARG), Ramonti (FR), Redoute's Dancer (AUS) and Square Eddie.

El Gran Senor's most successful filly was Grade One winner Toussaud. She ranks among a tiny handful of mares who have produced multiple Group/Grade 1 winners (4). Chester House (born in 1995 by Mr. Prospector) was first, winning the Arlington Million (Gr.1) in 2000. Advertised as a "genetic masterpiece", Chester House also showed promise as a stallion before cancer cut his stud career short in 2003, after only three years at stud. Next was daughter Honest Lady (born in 1996 by Seattle Slew), who won the Santa Monica Handicap (Gr.1) and finished second against the boys in the Metropolitan Handicap (Gr.1). Honest Lady became an excellent broodmare herself, producing Gr.1 winner First Defence along with stakes winners Phantom Rose and Honest Quality. After Honest Lady came Chiselling (born in 1999 by Woodman), who won the Secretariat Stakes (Gr.1). Chiselling was initially going be sent to South Africa for stud; however, he was diagnosed with Equine Protozoal Myeloencephalitis and it is unclear what happened to him after he missed the 2004 breeding season. Her fourth and final Grade 1 winner is arguably her best, Belmont Stakes (Gr.1) winner Empire Maker (born in 2000 by Unbridled). In addition to the Belmont, Empire Maker won two other Gr.1s, the Wood Memorial and Florida Derby. Empire Maker stood at his owner-breeder Prince Khalid Abdullah's Juddmonte Farm in Kentucky until 2010, when he was sold to the Japan Bloodhorse Breeders Association to stand at Shizunai Stallion Station. Eleven days earlier, his two-year-old daughter, future champion Royal Delta, won her first start by 12 lengths. In September 2015, two months after his grandson American Pharoah won the American Triple Crown, it was announced that Empire Maker had been bought back from Japan and as of 2019 he stands at Gainesway Farm in Lexington, Kentucky.

El Gran Senor was euthanised on 18 October 2006 at Ashford Stud in Kentucky due to the infirmities of old age.

=== Major winners ===
c = colt, f = filly, g = gelding

Foaled	Name	Sex	Major Wins
1986	Al Hareb	c	William Hill Futurity
1986	Gran Alba	c	Christmas Hurdle
1987	Belmez	c	King George VI & Queen Elizabeth Stakes
1989	Rodrigo de Triano	c	Middle Park Stakes, 2000 Guineas, Irish 2000 Guineas, International Stakes, Champion Stakes
1989	Toussaud	f	Gamely Stakes
1990	Corrazona	f	Beverly Hills Handicap
1990	Lit de Justice	c	Breeders' Cup Sprint
1993	Le Triton	c	Prix Jean Prat
1995	Saratoga Springs	c	Racing Post Trophy
1995	Spanish Fern	f	Yellow Ribbon Stakes

== Pedigree ==
Pedigree of El Gran Senor (USA), bay stallion, 1981
Sire Northern Dancer (CAN) 1961	Nearctic (CAN); 1954	Nearco	Pharos
Sire Northern Dancer (CAN) 1961	Nearctic (CAN); 1954	Nearco	Nogara
Sire Northern Dancer (CAN) 1961	Nearctic (CAN); 1954	Lady Angela	Hyperion
Sire Northern Dancer (CAN) 1961	Nearctic (CAN); 1954	Lady Angela	Sister Sarah
Sire Northern Dancer (CAN) 1961	Natalma (USA); 1957	Native Dancer	Polynesian
Sire Northern Dancer (CAN) 1961	Natalma (USA); 1957	Native Dancer	Geisha
Sire Northern Dancer (CAN) 1961	Natalma (USA); 1957	Almahmoud	Mahmoud
Sire Northern Dancer (CAN) 1961	Natalma (USA); 1957	Almahmoud	Arbitrator
Dam Sex Appeal (USA) 1970	Buckpasser (USA); 1963	Tom Fool	Menow
Dam Sex Appeal (USA) 1970	Buckpasser (USA); 1963	Tom Fool	Gaga
Dam Sex Appeal (USA) 1970	Buckpasser (USA); 1963	Busanda	War Admiral
Dam Sex Appeal (USA) 1970	Buckpasser (USA); 1963	Busanda	Businesslike
Dam Sex Appeal (USA) 1970	Best In Show (USA); 1965	Traffic Judge	Alibhai
Dam Sex Appeal (USA) 1970	Best In Show (USA); 1965	Traffic Judge	Traffic Court
Dam Sex Appeal (USA) 1970	Best In Show (USA); 1965	Stolen Hour	Mr Busher
Dam Sex Appeal (USA) 1970	Best In Show (USA); 1965	Stolen Hour	Late Date (Family: 8f)
