= List of horse races =

The lists below show notable Thoroughbred horse races in various countries around the world. In countries with a grading system, the included races are normally Group or Grade 1. However, some restricted races such as the Queen's Plate in Canada are also included, and all races at the Royal Ascot festival are included because of their prestige.

== Flat races ==
=== Argentina ===
- Gran Premio Carlos Pellegrini
- Carreras de las Estrellas
- Gran Premio Jockey Club (Argentina)
- Gran Premio Nacional (Argentina) (Argentine Derby)
- Gran Premio Polla de Potrancas (Argentine 1000 Guineas)
- Gran Premio Polla de Potrillos (Argentine 2000 Guineas)
- Gran Premio Seleccion (Argentine Oaks)

=== Australia ===
- Australian Cup
- AJC Derby
- AJC Oaks
- Caulfield Cup
- Cox Plate
- Doncaster Handicap
- Golden Slipper Stakes
- The BMW Stakes
- Melbourne Cup
- Newmarket Handicap
- Stradbroke Handicap
- VRC Derby
- VRC Oaks

=== Austria ===
- Austrian Derby
- Austrian St.Leger
- Trial Stakes

=== Barbados ===
- Barbados Derby
- Barbados Gold Cup
- Midsummer Creole Classic

=== Belgium ===
- Grand Prix de Bruxelles
- Grand Prix Prince Rose

=== Brazil ===
- Grande Prêmio Bento Gonçalves
- Grande Prêmio Brasil
- Grande Prêmio Cruzeiro do Sul (Brazilian Derby)
- Grande Prêmio Derby Paranaense
- Grande Prêmio Derby Paulista
- Grande Prêmio Derby Riogtandense
- Grande Prêmio Diana (Brazilian Oaks)
- Grande Prêmio Major Suckow
- Grande Prêmio Paraná
- Grande Prêmio Presidente da Republica
- Grande Prêmio Protetora do Turfe
- Grande Prêmio Princesa do Sul
- Grande Prêmio Roberto e Nelson Seabra
- Grande Prêmio São Paulo
- Grande Prêmio Turfe Gaucho
- Grande Prêmio Turfe Paranaense

=== Canada ===
- Breeders' Stakes
- Canadian International Stakes
- E.P. Taylor Stakes
- Prince of Wales Stakes
- Queen's Plate
- Natalma Stakes
- Northern Dancer Turf Stakes
- Woodbine Mile

=== Chile ===
- Dos Mil Guineas (Chilean 2000 Guineas)
- El Derby (Chilean Derby)
- Clásico El Ensayo
- Gran Premio Hipodromo Chile
- Clásico St. Leger (Chilean St.Leger)

=== Czech Republic ===
- Ceske Derby
- Ceske St.Leger
- Ceske Velka Jarni Cena (Ceske 2000 Guineas)

=== Denmark ===
- Dansk 1000 Guineas
- Dansk 2000 Guineas
- Dansk Derby
- Dansk Oaks
- Dansk St.Leger
- Scandinavian Open Championship

=== France ===
- Grand Prix de Paris
- Poule d'Essai des Poulains (French 2000 Guineas)
- Poule d'Essai des Pouliches (French 1000 Guineas)
- Prix de l'Arc de Triomphe
- Prix de Diane (French Oaks)
- Prix du Jockey Club (French Derby)

=== Germany ===
- Bayerisches Zuchtrennen
- Deutsches Derby
- Deutschland-Preis
- Grosser Preis von Baden
- Mehl-Mülhens-Rennen (German 2000 Guineas)
- Preis der Diana (German Oaks)
- Preis von Europa
- Rheinland-Pokal

=== Hong Kong ===
- Champions Mile
- Centenary Sprint Cup
- Chairman's Sprint Prize
- Hong Kong Champions & Chater Cup
- Hong Kong Cup
- Hong Kong Classic Mile
- Hong Kong Classic Cup
- Hong Kong Derby
- Hong Kong Gold Cup
- Hong Kong Mile
- Hong Kong Sprint
- Hong Kong Vase
- Stewards' Cup
- Queen Elizabeth II Cup
- Queen's Silver Jubilee Cup

=== Hungary ===
- Magyar Derby
- Magyar St. Leger
- Nemzeti dij (Hungarian 2000 Guineas)
- Kincsem dij

=== Ireland ===
- Irish 1,000 Guineas
- Irish 2,000 Guineas
- Irish Champion Stakes
- Irish Derby
- Irish Oaks
- Irish St. Leger

=== Italy ===
- Derby Italiano
- Gran Premio del Jockey Club
- Gran Premio Merano
- Gran Premio di Milano
- Oaks d'Italia (Italian Oaks)
- Premio Parioli (Italian 2000 Guineas)
- Premio Presidente della Repubblica
- Premio Regina Elena (Italian 1000 Guineas)

=== Japan ===
- Asahi Hai Futurity Stakes
- Arima Kinen (Japanese winter Grand Prix)
- Champions Cup
- February Stakes
- Hanshin Juvenile Fillies
- Hopeful Stakes (Japan)
- Japan Cup
- Kikuka Sho (Japanese St.Leger)
- Mile Championship
- NHK Mile Cup
- Oka Sho (Japanese 1000 Guineas)
- Osaka Hai
- Queen Elizabeth II Cup (Japan)
- Satsuki Sho (Japanese 2000 Guineas)
- Shuka Sho
- Sprinters Stakes
- Takamatsunomiya Kinen
- Takarazuka Kinen (Japanese summer Grand Prix)
- Tenno Sho
- Tokyo Daishoten
- Tokyo Yushun (Japanese Derby)
- Yasuda Kinen
- Yushun Himba (Japanese Oaks)

=== Mauritius ===
- Barbé Cup
- Duchess of York Cup
- Duke of York Cup
- Maiden Cup

=== New Zealand ===
- Arrowfield Stud Plate
- Auckland Cup
- Bonecrusher New Zealand Stakes
- Captain Cook Stakes
- Easter Handicap
- Levin Classic
- Livamol Classic
- Manawatu Sires Produce Stakes
- New Zealand 1000 Guineas
- New Zealand 2000 Guineas
- New Zealand Derby
- New Zealand International Stakes
- New Zealand Oaks
- New Zealand Thoroughbred Breeders Stakes
- Otaki-Maori Weight for Age
- Railway Stakes (New Zealand)
- Sistema Stakes
- Tarzino Trophy
- Telegraph Handicap
- Thorndon Mile
- Waikato Sprint
- Wellington Cup
- Zabeel Classic

=== Norway ===
- Marit Sveaas Minneløp
- Norsk 1000 Guineas
- Norsk 2000 Guineas
- Norsk Derby
- Norsk Oaks
- Norsk St. Leger

=== Pakistan ===
- Quaid-e-Azam Gold Cup
- Pakistan Derby
- New Year Cup
- 1000 Guineas of Pakistan
- 2000 Guineas of Pakistan
- Pakistan St. Ledger Cup
- Pakistan Oaks
- Anarkali cup

=== Peru ===
- Derby Nacional

=== Philippines ===
- Gran Copa
- Presidential Gold Cup

=== Poland ===
- Nagroda Derby Half Blood Derby (in English)
- Nagroda St. Leger
- Nagroda Rulera (Polish 2000 Guineas)
- Nagroda Wielka Warszawska
- Warsaw Derby

=== Romania ===
- Romanian Derby

=== Russia ===
- Bolszoj Vserossijskij Priz (Russian Derby)

=== Singapore ===
- KrisFlyer International Sprint
- Singapore Airlines International Cup
- Singapore Classic
- Singapore Derby
- Singapore Gold Cup

=== Slovakia ===
- Slovenske Derby
- Slovenske St.Leger
- Slovenske Velka Jarna Cena (Slovenske 2000 Guineas)

=== South Africa ===
- Cape Argus Guineas
- Champions Cup
- Durban July Handicap
- J&B Metropolitan Stakes
- S A Classic
- S A Derby (South African Derby)
- South African Champion Stakes
- The Annual Simonsberg Metropolitan

=== South Korea ===
- Korean Derby
- Korean Grand Prix
- Korean Oaks
- President Cup
- Korea Cup
- Korea Sprint

=== Serbia ===
- Trial Stakes (Serbian 2000 Guineas)
- Serbian Derby
- Serbian St. Leger
- Pehar Predsednika republike
- Trka Grada Beograda
- Kup Princa Pavla

=== Spain ===
- Gran Premio Madrid
- Premio Beamonte (Spanish Oaks)
- Premio Cimera (Spanish 2000 Guineas)
- Premio Valderas (Spanish 1000 Guineas)
- Premio Villamejor (Spanish St. Leger)
- Premio Villapadierna (Spanish Derby)

=== Sweden ===
- Jockeyklubbens Jubileumslopning (Swedish 2000 Guineas)
- Svenskt Derby
- Svenskt Oaks
- Svenskt St. Leger
- Stockholm Cup International
- Täby Open Sprint Championship

=== Switzerland ===
- Swiss 1000 Guineas
- Swiss 2000 Guineas
- Swiss Derby
- Swiss Oaks
- Swiss St. Leger

=== Turkey ===
- Ankara Stakes (Turkish St. Leger)
- Turkish Prime Ministry Cup
- Turkish Presidency Cup
- Dişi Tay Deneme (Turkish 1000 Guineas)
- Erkek Tay Deneme (Turkish 2000 Guineas)
- Gazi Derby (Turkish Derby)
- Kısrak (Turkish Oaks)

=== United Arab Emirates ===
- Dubai Duty Free Stakes
- Dubai Golden Shaheen
- Dubai Sheema Classic
- Dubai World Cup
- Godolphin Mile
- UAE Derby
- UAE 2000 Guineas

=== United Kingdom ===
- 1,000 Guineas Stakes
- 2,000 Guineas Stakes
- British Champions Fillies' and Mares' Stakes
- British Champions Sprint Stakes
- Champion Stakes
- Dewhurst Stakes
- Doncaster Cup (world's oldest race)
- Eclipse Stakes
- Derby Stakes (aka Epsom Derby)
- Oaks Stakes (aka Epsom Oaks)
- Goodwood Cup
- International Stakes
- July Cup
- King George VI and Queen Elizabeth Stakes
- Queen Elizabeth II Stakes (British Champions Mile)
- Royal Ascot:
  - Day 1 (2015–Present):
    - Queen Anne Stakes
    - Coventry Stakes
    - King's Stand Stakes
    - St James's Palace Stakes
    - Ascot Stakes
    - Windsor Castle Stakes
  - Day 2:
    - Jersey Stakes
    - Queen Mary Stakes
    - Duke of Cambridge Stakes
    - Prince of Wales's Stakes
    - Royal Hunt Cup
    - Sandringham Handicap
  - Day 3:
    - Norfolk Stakes
    - Hampton Court Stakes
    - Ribblesdale Stakes
    - Gold Cup
    - Britannia Stakes
    - King George V Stakes
  - Day 4:
    - Albany Stakes
    - King Edward VII Stakes
    - Commonwealth Cup
    - Coronation Stakes
    - Duke of Edinburgh Stakes
    - Queen's Vase
  - Day 5:
    - Chesham Stakes
    - Wolferton Handicap
    - Hardwicke Stakes
    - Diamond Jubilee Stakes
    - Wokingham Stakes
    - Queen Alexandra Stakes
- Royal Lodge Stakes
- St Leger Stakes
- Sussex Stakes
- Yorkshire Oaks
- See also: List of British flat horse races

=== United States ===
- American Oaks
- Arkansas Derby
- Arlington Million
- Bayakoa Stakes (Los Alamitos)
- Belmont Stakes
- Blue Grass Stakes
- Breeders' Cup series:
  - Day 1 (2013–present):
    - Breeders' Cup Juvenile Sprint (discontinued)
    - Breeders' Cup Marathon (discontinued)
    - Breeders' Cup Juvenile Turf
    - Breeders' Cup Dirt Mile
    - Breeders' Cup Juvenile Fillies Turf
    - Breeders' Cup Distaff (known as the Breeders' Cup Ladies' Classic between 2008 and 2012)
  - Day 2 (2013–present):
    - Breeders' Cup Juvenile Fillies
    - Breeders' Cup Turf Sprint
    - Breeders' Cup Filly & Mare Sprint
    - Breeders' Cup Filly & Mare Turf
    - Breeders' Cup Sprint
    - Breeders' Cup Mile
    - Breeders' Cup Juvenile
    - Breeders' Cup Turf
    - Breeders' Cup Classic
- Donn Handicap (discontinued)
- Florida Derby
- Florida Oaks
- Fourstardave Handicap
- Haskell Invitational Stakes
- Hollywood Gold Cup
- Jockey Club Gold Cup
- Kentucky Derby
- Kentucky Oaks
- Louisiana Derby
- Maker's Mark Mile Stakes
- Manhattan Handicap
- Metropolitan Handicap
- Monmouth Cup Stakes
- Pacific Classic Stakes
- Pegasus World Cup (effective replacement of Donn Handicap)
- Pennsylvania Derby
- Preakness Stakes
- Runhappy Stakes
- Santa Ana Stakes
- Santa Anita Derby
- Santa Anita Handicap
- Santa Anita Oaks
- Travers Stakes
- Whitmore Stakes
- Whitney Handicap
- Wood Memorial
- Woodward Stakes
- Woodford Stakes
- Zenyatta Stakes

See also: Graded stakes race for a full list of Grade 1 races in the United States

=== Uruguay ===
- Gran Premio José Pedro Ramírez
- Gran Premio Nacional (Uruguayan Derby)
- Gran Premio Polla de Potrillos (Uruguayan 2000 Guineas)
- Gran Premio Jockey Club

== Steeplechases and hurdles ==
=== Australia ===
- Great Eastern Steeplechase
- Grand Annual Steeplechase
- Grand National Steeplechase

=== Belgium ===
- Grand Steeple-Chase des Flandres

=== Czech Republic ===
- Velká pardubická

=== France ===
- Grand Steeple-Chase de Paris
- Grande Course de Haies d'Auteuil
- Grand Prix d'Automne
- Prix La Haye Jousselin

=== Ireland ===
- Irish Grand National
- Punchestown Champion Chase
- Punchestown Gold Cup
- Punchestown Champion Hurdle

=== Italy ===
- Gran Premio Merano

=== Japan ===
- Nakayama Grand Jump (Recap can be seen via JRA International Race Recap
- Nakayama Daishogai

=== New Zealand ===
- Great Northern Hurdles
- Great Northern Steeplechase
- Grand National Hurdles (New Zealand)
- Grand National Steeplechase (New Zealand)

=== United Kingdom ===
- Champion Hurdle
- Queen Mother Champion Chase
- World Hurdle
- Cheltenham Gold Cup
- Grand National
- King George VI Chase

=== United States ===
- American Grand National Steeplechase
- Breeders' Cup Grand National Steeplechase
- Maryland Hunt Cup
- The Brookhill Steeplechase
- Iroquois Steeplechase, Nashville, Tennessee
- Marion DuPont Scott Colonial Cup
- Carolina Cup
- Queens Cup Steeplechase held in Mineral Springs, North Carolina

== See also ==
- Flat racing
- Horse racing
- National Hunt racing
- Steeplechase
- Thoroughbred racing
