= Romántico (horse) =

Uruguayan Thoroughbred racehorse

Romantico
- Sire: Caboclo
- Grandsire: Gradely
- Dam: Rosaflor
- Damsire: Stayer
- Sex: Stallion
- Foaled: 1935
- Country: Uruguay
- Colour: Bay
- Breeder: Haras Casupá de Uruguay
- Owner: Stud El Refugio
- Trainer: José "Pepito" Petraglia
- Record: 23: 14 - 5 - 2

Major wins
- Gran Premio Carlos Pellegrini (1938, 1939); Gran Premio José Pedro Ramírez (1939, 1940)

Romántico (September 3, 1935 – 1957) was a South American Thoroughbred racehorse. He twice won two major Argentinian and Uruguayan races: the Gran Premio José Pedro Ramírez (1939, 1940), and the Gran Premio Carlos Pellegrini (1938, 1939). He also won the Gran Premio Nacional (Uruguay), Polla de Potrillos, and the Uruguayan Triple Crown, among others. Nicknamed El petizo sin par, Romántico is considered the best Uruguayan thoroughbred of the 20th century.

== Background ==
Romántico was bred by Haras Casupá de Uruguay, sired by Caboclo and out of the mare Rosaflor. He was sold at auction, and purchased by José "Pepito" Petraglia for $1,900 in promissory notes, set to expire in 90 days. During those 90 days, Petraglia was very impressed with the colt, but was unable to acquire the funds to pay off the promissory notes by himself. During a call with his friend Dr. Vecce, Petraglia convinced one of Dr. Vecce's patients to enter a partnership with him, eventually resulting in a partnership of José Petraglia, Dr. Vecce, Santiago Sassi, and Carlos Rivera.

== Racing career ==
=== 1938 ===
Romántico first raced on April 17, 1938, as a two-year-old, in a 1200-meter race at Hipodromo Nacional de Maroñas, finishing second. Six days later, Romántico again finished second, in the Clásico Uruguay. Romántico won his first race on May eighth, covering 1300 meters in 1:19.0. Romántico finished third and second in the Clásico Independencia and Clásico Maroñas before winning again in the Clásico Chile. As a new three-year-old, Romántico ran in the 1600 meters Clásico Jorge Pacheco as the favorite, winning by three-quarters of a length in 1:36.0.

Romántico next ran in the Gran Premio Polla de Potrillos, the first leg of the Uruguayan Triple Crown, winning by a length and a half, with the time for the 1600 meters once again being 1:36.0. A month later, Romántico contested the Gran Premio Jockey Club. At 2000 meters long, the second leg of the Triple Crown was the longest race yet run by Romántico. Romántico won in 2:02 3/5 by half a length. Before the final leg of the Triple Crown, Romántico ran in the Clásico Producción Nacional, finishing fifth in the 2300 meter race. This loss led to some doubts about Romántico's ability to last the distance of the 2500 meter long Gran Premio Nacional to win the Triple Crown. Buffalo, who had finished second in the Gran Premio Jockey Club and Clásico Producción Nacional, was the favorite. Romántico proved capable of the distance, winning the Gran Premio Nacional in a time of 2:33 4/5.

In November, Romántico ran outside of Hipódromo Nacional de Maroñas for the first time, traveling to Argentina's Hipódromo Argentino de Palermo for their premier race, the Gran Premio Carlos Pellegrini. Romántico covered the 3000 meters of the race in 3:06 2/5 to win over twelve others, including Argentinian Triple Crown winner Sorteado.

A month later, Romántico was back in Uruguay, contesting the Clásico Comparación. In a fantastic duel down the stretch, Romántico finished second by a half a length to Mascagni, setting a record time of 2:31 for the 2500 meters and bringing Mascagni's stakes win streak to ten. Romántico was given seven kilograms on the scale by the older horse.

=== 1939 ===
On January 6, 1939, Romántico ran in the Gran Premio José Pedro Ramírez, considered the most important horse race in Uruguay. He won by three-quarters of a length in 3:07 2/5. Following the victory, plans were announced for Romántico to run in the Gran Premio Municipal before returning to Argentina to contest their principal long-distance races. Romántico easily won the Gran Premio Municipal before shipping to Argentina.

Romántico's first Argentinian race in 1939 was the Clásico Chacabuco in July, run over 3000 meters on the turf, Romántico's first race on that surface, at Hipódromo de San Isidro. As the favorite, Romántico won by a length and a half in 3:05.0, a new record for the race. A month later, Romántico won the Clásico General Pueyrredón at Palermo, the longest race on the Argentinian calendar at 4000 meters. The win was considered a weak one, as Romántico only by a neck over two inferior opponents. Romántico again ran poorly in his next race, the Gran Premio de Honor – Copa de Oro, also at Palermo. Romántico finished second by half a neck to Halifax, with many blaming the loss on Romántico's jockey, Numan Lalinde.

Coming off of the two poor performances and against such company as Embrujo, the undefeated Argentinian Triple Crown winner, Romántico's chances of winning a second Gran Premio Carlos Pellegrini were thought to be almost none. In the stretch, Partido was in the lead and looked to be the winner, with Embrujo falling behind and Bon Vin unable to make up in any ground. Romántico, who had been in the back for most of the race, started to close on Partido and within the final ten meters passed Partido to win the race by a head. With the win, Romántico became on the sixth two-time winner of the race.

Romántico ran once more in Argentina before returning to Uruguay, finishing third in the Argentinian Clásico Comparación at San Isidro. In December, back in Uruguay, he won the 3500 meter Uruguayan Gran Premio de Honor.

=== 1940 ===
On January 6, 1940, Romántico again contested the prestigious Gran Premio José Pedro Ramírez, and again won, beating eight others in 3:06 4/5. He became the fifth horse to win the Gran Premio José Pedro Ramírez twice. After the win, Romántico suffered health problems and problems with his tendons. Petraglia had him skip the Gran Premio Municipal and all other races until November and the Gran Premio Carlos Pellegrini. Ridden by Irineo Leguisamo, Romántico finished last of six in his final race.

== Retirement and stud career ==
After retirement from racing, Romántico stood at stud at Luis Laures's Haras 25 de Agosto in Las Piedras, Uruguay, despite interest from several Argentinian studs. In 1953, Haras 25 de Agosto was liquidated and Romántico was exported to Brazil, where he lived until his death in 1957. Romántico's stud career was considered mediocre, and he never sired anything of note.

== Pedigree ==
Pedigree of Romántico (URU), bay stallion, foaled September 3, 1935
| Sire Caboclo (URU) | Gradely (IRE) | Desmond (GB) | St. Simon (GB) |
| Sire Caboclo (URU) | Gradely (IRE) | Desmond (GB) | L'Abbesse de Jouarre (GB) |
| Sire Caboclo (URU) | Gradely (IRE) | Ishallah (IRE) | Gallinule (GB) |
| Sire Caboclo (URU) | Gradely (IRE) | Ishallah (IRE) | Concussion (GB) |
| Sire Caboclo (URU) | Coracita (URU) | Progreso (GB) | Galopin (GB) |
| Sire Caboclo (URU) | Coracita (URU) | Progreso (GB) | Lady Chelmsford (GB) |
| Sire Caboclo (URU) | Coracita (URU) | Coraza (URU) | Guerrillero (GB) |
| Sire Caboclo (URU) | Coracita (URU) | Coraza (URU) | La Marechale (GB) |
| Dam Rosaflor (URU) | Stayer (URU) | Enero (ARG) | Old Man (ARG) |
| Dam Rosaflor (URU) | Stayer (URU) | Enero (ARG) | Enfantine (ARG) |
| Dam Rosaflor (URU) | Stayer (URU) | Sevillana (ARG) | Le Samaritain (FR) |
| Dam Rosaflor (URU) | Stayer (URU) | Sevillana (ARG) | Vespertina (GB) |
| Dam Rosaflor (URU) | La Buena Moza (ARG) | Dusty Miller (GB) | St. Frusquin (GB) |
| Dam Rosaflor (URU) | La Buena Moza (ARG) | Dusty Miller (GB) | Rydal (GB) |
| Dam Rosaflor (URU) | La Buena Moza (ARG) | Welbeck (USA) | Kinley Mack (USA) |
| Dam Rosaflor (URU) | La Buena Moza (ARG) | Welbeck (USA) | Berriedale (GB) |
