= Invasor (horse) =

Argentine-bred Thoroughbred racehorse

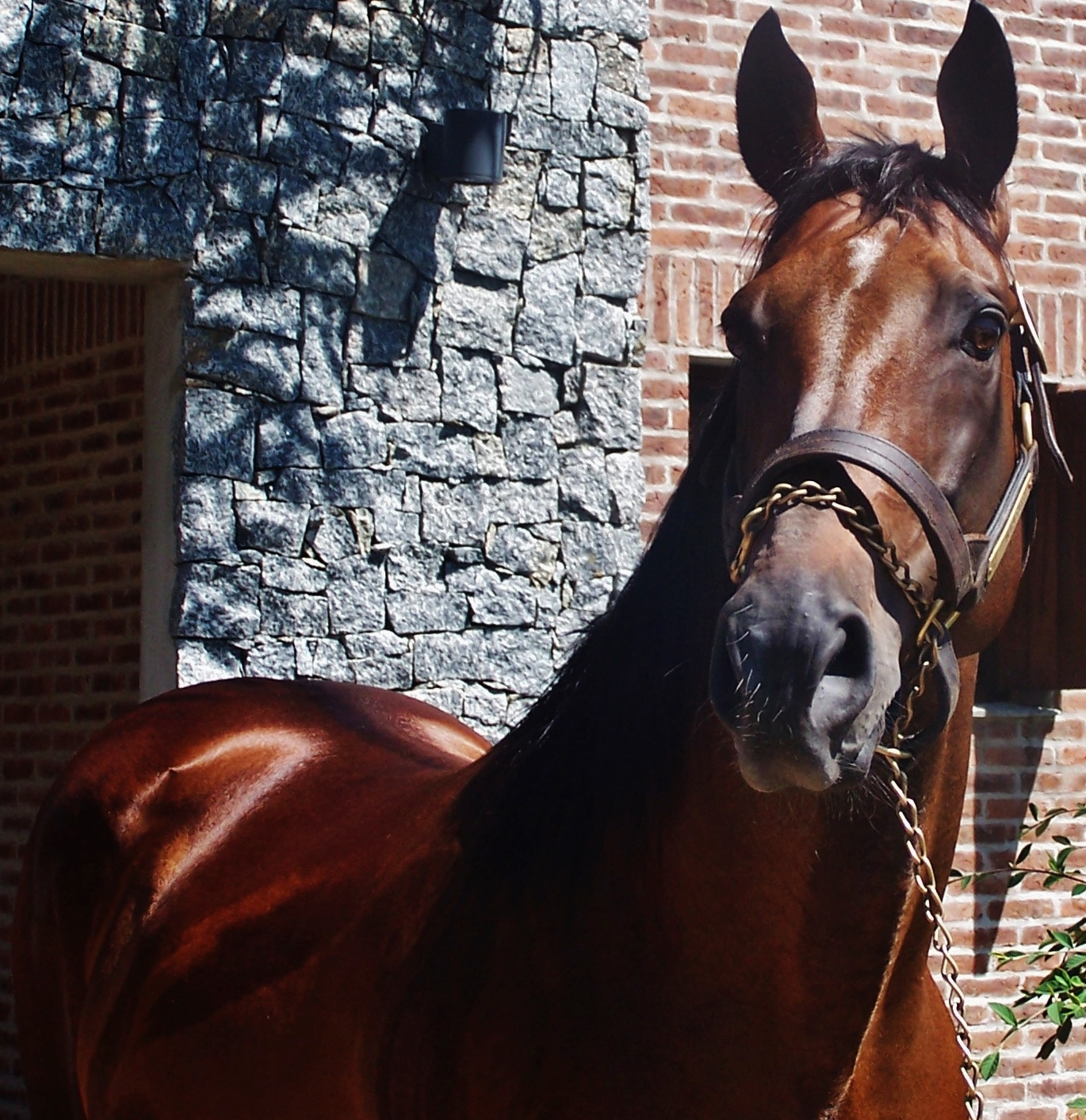
- Sire: Candy Stripes (USA)
- Grandsire: Blushing Groom
- Dam: Quendom (ARG)
- Damsire: Interprete (ARG)
- Sex: Stallion
- Foaled: August 3, 2002 (age 24)
- Country: Uruguay
- Colour: Bay
- Breeder: Haras Clausan (Haras Santa Ines)
- Owner: Stud 3 de Enero (2005); Shadwell Stable
- Trainer: Anibal San Martin (2005); Kiaran McLaughlin (2006-2007)
- Record: 12: 11-0-0
- Earnings: $7,804,070

Major wins
- Clásico Ensayo (2005); Polla de Potrillos (2005); GP Jockey Club (2005); GP Nacional (2005); Pimlico Special (2006); Suburban Handicap (2006); Whitney Handicap (2006); Donn Handicap (2007); Dubai World Cup (2007) Breeders' Cup wins: Breeders' Cup Classic (2006)

Awards
- Uruguayan Triple Crown winner (2005); Uruguayan Horse of the Year (2005); United States Champion Older Male Horse (2006); United States Horse of the Year (2006) #1 - World Thoroughbred Racehorse Rankings (2006)

Honours
- United States Racing Hall of Fame inductee (2013); Invasor Stakes at Hipodromo Nacional de Maroñas; Clasico Invasor at Hipodromo de San Isidro

Invasor (foaled August 3, 2002) is a Uruguayan Thoroughbred racehorse born in Argentina by Haras Clausan (Haras Santa Ines). The winner of the 2005 Triple Crown in Uruguay, he was later purchased by Sheik Hamdan bin Rashid Al Maktoum, who paid approximately US$1.4 million for the horse. His two biggest wins were the 2006 Breeders' Cup Classic, in which he defeated heavily favored Bernardini and highly fancied Lava Man, and the 2007 Dubai World Cup, the world's richest horse race. He finished racing with a record of eleven wins in twelve starts and career earnings of $7,804,070. He was voted the Eclipse Award for American Horse of the Year and led the year-end World Thoroughbred Racehorse Rankings in 2006. In 2013 he was inducted into the National Museum of Racing and Hall of Fame in Saratoga Springs, New York.

== Beginnings ==
A bay stallion with a small white star, Invasor was foaled in Argentina, sired by the famous Candy Stripes out of Quendom (ARG) by Interprete (ARG). Candy Stripes was also the sire of such notable horses as Criollito, Different, Leroidesanimaux, Lundy's Liability, Sweetest Thing, and Victory Stripes. Quendom and Invasor's maternal line are at Haras Santa Ines, Duggan, Province of Buenos Aires, Argentina. Invasor was bought as a two-year-old by Pablo Hernandez and brothers Juan Luis and Luis Alberto Vio Bado, Uruguayans who brought him to their home country.

Pablo Hernandez remembers the day he and the two brothers first saw Invasor. Their friend, Miguel Ezcurra from Bullrich Auctioneers, took them by car to visit some smaller farms near Buenos Aires. After looking at 80 colts and fillies at several farms, they went to Haras Clausan (Haras Santa Ines) in Duggan, Province of Buenos Aires, Argentina, and saw Invasor. "It was as if we had been hit with Cupid's arrow," said Hernandez. "We just fell in love with him." Sandro Miserocchi, owner of Haras Clausan (renamed Haras Santa Ines), said the horse would cost them $25,000. The three Uruguayans countered with $18,000. They all settled for $20,000. Hernandez said, "We purchased him and exported him to Maroñas Racetrack in Uruguay."

Quendom (ARG), Invasor's mother, and the rest of his family are still at Haras Santa Ines.

== Racing record ==
Trained by Anibal San Martin, Invasor was ridden by Gustavo Duarte, one of Uruguay's leading jockeys. Duarte called Invasor the best horse he's ever ridden.

Invasor broke his maiden in his debut in Maroñas in late February 2005, winning a 5½ furlong maiden race by 6¾ lengths, but then fractured his right hind sesamoid and required surgery. He did not race again until August, when he won the "Ensayo" Stakes over 7½ furlongs by 2½ lengths.

=== Uruguayan Triple Crown ===
Invasor won the first leg of the Uruguayan Triple Crown, the one mile Gran Premio Polla de Potrillos run on September 10, by 5¾ lengths under heavy rain on a muddy track. One month later, on October 9, he won the 2000 m (1¼ mile) Gran Premio Jockey Club by 3½ lengths, and then completed the sweep, winning the Gran Premio Nacional by 6½ lengths. In all three races, Potri Flash came second. With this sweep, Invasor became a favorite of the public, and a favorite to win Uruguay's most important race, the championship Gran Premio Internacional José Pedro Ramírez, run every January 6 in Maroñas.

His total earnings for taking the Triple Crown amounted to $113,866.

Invasor was sold after winning the Uruguayan Triple Crown to Sheik Hamdan bin Rashid Al Maktoum, who paid around US$1,400,000 to have the horse run for Shadwell Stable. Although one Vio Brado brother was very reluctant to sell, the deal was made, and Invasor was flown into Florida, southernmost of the contiguous US states, to be trained by Kiaran McLaughlin at the Palm Meadows Thoroughbred Training Center in Florida. There, the horse prepared for his next race, the UAE Derby.

=== 2006 Season ===
After training in Florida, Invasor was sent to Dubai to compete in the UAE Derby, running into traffic problems but coming on again to end up only a half length behind the 3rd and 2nd horses, albeit far from the winner, Discreet Cat (owned by the competing Godolphin Stables). Returning to the United States, he returned to the track in May to win the Grade I Pimlico Special by 1¼ lengths over Wanderin Boy, after stalking the leader through most of the race. On July 1, Invasor won the Grade I Suburban Handicap by 4 lengths at Belmont Park. On 6 August, he won his third straight Grade I race, holding off a hard-charging Sun King to win a photo finish in the Whitney Handicap at Saratoga. Invasor was pointed to the Jockey Club Gold Cup but developed a fever a week prior to the race, so his trainer decided to skip it and point him to the Breeders' Cup Classic to be run in November 2006.

Though he was now owned by a sheikh and raced in the United States, Invasor was Uruguay's national hero. In Uruguay, whenever the horse ran, people flocked to their nearest simulcast provider. "There was great anticipation here for the Jockey Club Gold Cup," said Pablo Roig, editor of Uruguay Turf Line. "Here in Montevideo, we follow all his races through the OTB simulcasts, and the people are enjoying all his victories."

"In Uruguay, soccer is our main sport," said Luis Costa Baleta, a horse owner from a long-time Uruguayan racing family. "Whenever the national team plays, the entire country stops to watch the match. Since Invasor has gone to the United States, every time he runs, all the simulcast halls are crowded with people who come to see him and bet on him. They shout and cheer for him as if Uruguay was playing in the finals of the World Cup. They treat the horse as if he were still their own. No one can imagine what it's like. He's become a national hero."

The racing journalist and writer Miguel Aguirre Bayley wrote: "In my opinion, Invasor excelled because of his refined qualities, his endurance, and his outstanding intelligence. Invasor may well become one of the best racehorses in the history of the American Turf."

==== 2006 Breeders' Cup ====
On November 4, 2006, Invasor, ridden by Fernando Jara, won the $5 million Breeders' Cup Classic at Churchill Downs, Kentucky. The field included favored Bernardini, second favorite Lava Man, and European three-year-old champion George Washington. Invasor, going 8-wide, under the guidance of the 18-year-old jockey Jara, passed Bernardini in the home stretch to win by a length. This win essentially secured the Eclipse Awards for Older Male Horse and Horse of the Year. He also effectively secured a Grand Slam of horse racing, as he had won the previous year's local Triple Crown and then secured the Classic.

=== 2007 Season ===
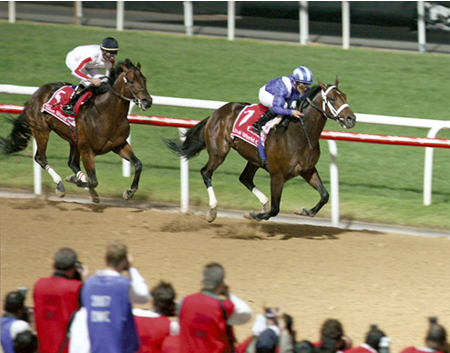

On February 3, 2007, Invasor won his fifth successive Grade I victory in the Donn Handicap at Gulfstream Park. Coming from off the pace, he was virtually stopped when Barcola, the long-shot pacesetter, began backing up. Under jockey Fernando Jara, Invasor was forced to check. Trying to angle off the rail, he was still blocked, clipping heels with Barcola. Coming into the stretch, Invasor and Jara found the hole they needed and squeezed through, achieving a two length victory over Hesanoldsalt, ridden by Rafael Bejarano.

==== 2007 Dubai World Cup ====
On March 31, 2007, Invasor, again ridden by Fernando Jara, took the $6 million Dubai World Cup in the United Arab Emirates against his rival Discreet Cat. His time of 1:59.97 for 2,000 meters was the second fastest in the race's history, exceeded only by Dubai Millennium's time of 1:59.50 in 2000. Discreet Cat finished last by 23 lengths, but Premium Tap, who had set the pace, battled Invasor in the stretch for place with the Hong Kong horse Bullish Luck third.

Invasor returned to the United States for a summer campaign but was injured and retired. He started twelve times and won eleven races. In the one race that he lost, the UAE Derby, he finished fourth behind Discreet Cat, a loss Invasor avenged in the running of the 2007 Dubai World Cup. His career earnings were $7,804,070.

== Race summary ==
Finish	Date	Race	Distance	Jockey	Time	Grade	Runner up/Winner	Track
1st	3/31/2007	Dubai World Cup	10 f	Fernando Jara	1:59.9	I	Premium Tap	Nad Al Sheba Racecourse
1st	2/3/2007	Donn Handicap	9 f	Fernando Jara	1:48.43	I	Hesanoldstaft	Gulfstream Park
1st	11/4/2006	Breeders' Cup Classic	10 f	Fernando Jara	2:02.18	I	Bernardini	Churchill Downs
1st	8/5/2006	Whitney Handicap	9 f	Fernando Jara	1:49.06	I	Sun King	Saratoga Race Course
1st	7/1/2006	Suburban Handicap	10 f	Fernando Jara	2:01.23	I	Wild Desert	Belmont Park
1st	5/19/2006	Pimlico Special Handicap	9.5 f	Ramon Dominguez	1:54.4	I	Wanderin Boy	Pimlico Race Course
4th	3/25/2006	UAE Derby	1 3/16m	Richard Hills		II	Discreet Cat	Nad Al Sheba Racecourse
1st	11/13/2005	Gran Premio Nacional (Uruguayan Derby)	12.5 f	Gustavo Duarte	2:36.74	I URU	Potri Flash	Maroñas
1st	10/9/2005	Gran Premio Jockey Club	10 f	Gustavo Duarte	2:02.41	I URU	Potri Flash	Maroñas
1st	9/10/2005	Polla de Potrillos (Uruguayan Two Thousand Guineas)	8 f	Fernando Olivera	1:36.26	I URU	Potri Flash	Maroñas
1st	8/7/2005	Clasico Ensayo	7.5 f	Gustavo Duarte	1:28.87	III URU	Vasco King	Maroñas
1st	2/27/2005	Lapsang (Maiden)	5.5 f	Gustavo Duarte	1:04.33		Lyon	Maroñas

== Retirement ==
Invasor was retired on June 23, 2007, after injuring his right hind ankle in the same area he had fractured when he was younger. He originally stood stud at Shadwell Farm in Lexington, Kentucky, for a stud fee of $35,000, later falling to $4,000 live foal. His first foal (out of the stakes-winning Danehill mare Abby Road) was foaled on January 11, 2009.

In 2013, Invasor was inducted into the National Museum of Racing and Hall of Fame.

In 2015, Shadwell announced that Invasor would be standing at Haras Cuatro Piedras in Uruguay. "There has been tremendous interest from South American breeders to have access to Invasor from the day he retired and we are pleased now to offer them this opportunity with his return to the country where he started his incredible racing career," said Kent Barnes, Shadwell Farm stallion manager.

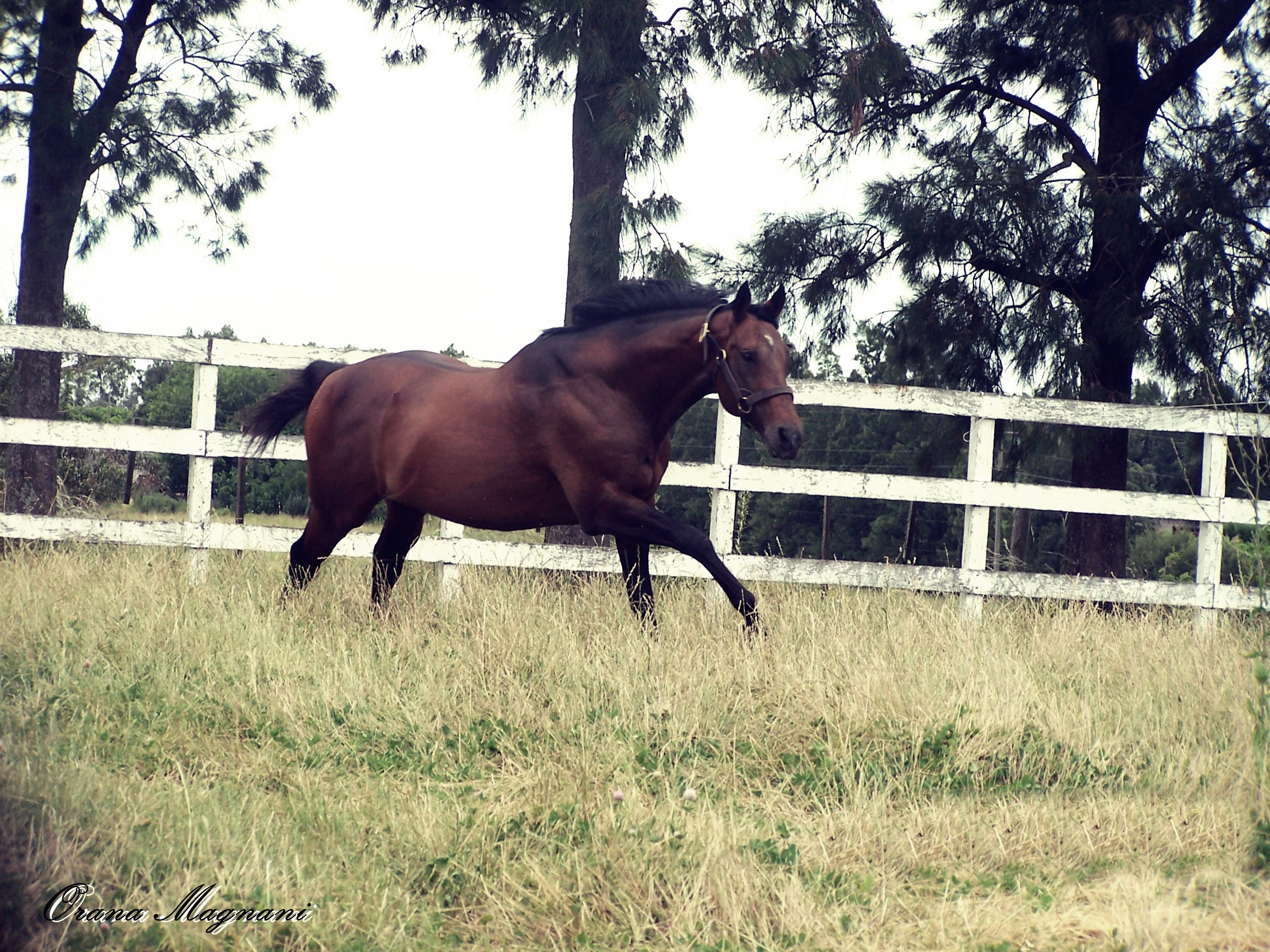

== Pedigree ==
Pedigree of Invasor, bay horse, 2002
Sire Candy Stripes (USA) ch. 1982	Blushing Groom (FR) ch. 1974	Red God	Nasrullah
Sire Candy Stripes (USA) ch. 1982	Blushing Groom (FR) ch. 1974	Red God	Spring Run
Sire Candy Stripes (USA) ch. 1982	Blushing Groom (FR) ch. 1974	Runaway Bride	Wild Risk
Sire Candy Stripes (USA) ch. 1982	Blushing Groom (FR) ch. 1974	Runaway Bride	Aimee
Sire Candy Stripes (USA) ch. 1982	Bubble Company (FR) ch. 1977	Lyphard	Northern Dancer
Sire Candy Stripes (USA) ch. 1982	Bubble Company (FR) ch. 1977	Lyphard	Goofed
Sire Candy Stripes (USA) ch. 1982	Bubble Company (FR) ch. 1977	Prodice	Prominer
Sire Candy Stripes (USA) ch. 1982	Bubble Company (FR) ch. 1977	Prodice	Euridice
Dam Quendom (ARG) blk. 1997	Interprete (ARG) dkb/br. 1988	Farnesio	Good Manners
Dam Quendom (ARG) blk. 1997	Interprete (ARG) dkb/br. 1988	Farnesio	La Farnesina
Dam Quendom (ARG) blk. 1997	Interprete (ARG) dkb/br. 1988	Inaccessible	Liloy
Dam Quendom (ARG) blk. 1997	Interprete (ARG) dkb/br. 1988	Inaccessible	Iliada
Dam Quendom (ARG) blk. 1997	Queen of Victory (ARG) dkb/br. 1990	Cipayo	Lacydon
Dam Quendom (ARG) blk. 1997	Queen of Victory (ARG) dkb/br. 1990	Cipayo	Tsarina
Dam Quendom (ARG) blk. 1997	Queen of Victory (ARG) dkb/br. 1990	Twitch Crown	Crown Thy Good
Dam Quendom (ARG) blk. 1997	Queen of Victory (ARG) dkb/br. 1990	Twitch Crown	Twins (F-No.14-c)

== See also ==
- List of leading Thoroughbred racehorses
- List of racehorses
