= Jimmy Winkfield =

American jockey

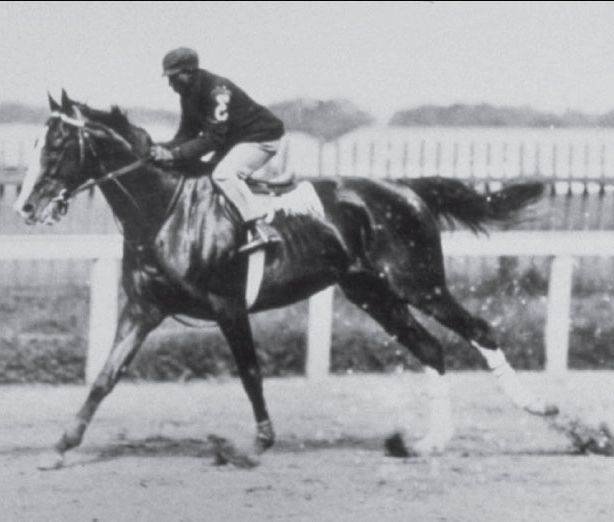
- Winkfield aboard Alan-a-Dale in 1902

Personal information
- Born: April 12, 1880 (Note: Quote: "Through his thirties, Winkfield indicated he was born about 1880, but as we'll see, in his forties he began to take two years off his age, apparently to improve his chances of getting hired to ride. He would make his birth date April 12, 1882, but there are no other records confirming this.") Chilesburg, Kentucky
- Died: March 23, 1974 (aged 91) Maisons-Laffitte, France
- Occupation: Jockey
- Spouse: Lydia de Minkiwitz

Horse racing career
- Sport: Horse racing
- Career wins: 2,600+

Major racing wins
- Clark Handicap (1901); Tennessee Derby (1901); Latonia Derby (1901); Kentucky Derby (1901, 1902); Moscow Derby (2); Russian Derby (4); Russian Oaks (5); Warsaw Derby (2); Grosser Preis von Baden (1909); Prix Eugène Adam (1922); Grand Prix de Deauville (1922); Prix du Président de la République (1923); Critérium de Maisons-Laffitte (1927)

Racing awards
- Russian Champion Jockey (3 times)

Honors
- National Museum of Racing and Hall of Fame (2004); Jimmy Winkfield Stakes at Aqueduct Racetrack; U.S. House of Representatives Resolution 231 honoring the life of Jimmy Winkfield

Significant horses
- His Eminence, Alan-a-Dale, McChesney

James Winkfield (April 12, 1880 – March 23, 1974) was an American horse racing jockey who won the Kentucky Derby in 1901 and 1902, becoming the last African American rider to win that race. In 1903 he left the United States for Russia where he achieved major success. In 1917, Winkfield led an evacuation of 250 top pedigree race horses from Ukraine to Poland as Russian Revolutionary troops approached. He also won major races in Europe including in Poland, Germany, Austria, Hungary, and France, with over 2,600 wins in his lifetime. Winkfield later settled in France and became a trainer.

== Career ==
Winfield was born in Chilesburg, Kentucky (now part of Lexington, Kentucky) and began his career as a jockey in 1898. His first racing start resulted in a four-horse accident right after the start, for which he was given a one-year suspension. He returned in 1900 to ride Thrive in the Kentucky Derby, finishing third. He rode in the race again in 1901 and 1902, winning on His Eminence and Alan-a-Dale respectively. In 1901, he won 160 races. He competed in his final Derby in 1903, finishing second on Early.

Winkfield was blackballed in the US after dishonoring a contract to ride for an owner by agreeing to ride for a different owner, but he was offered a chance to race in Russia in 1903, where he quickly rose to fame. He won the Russian Oaks five times, (Note: Winfield won the Russian Oaks in 1904, 1905, 1907, 1911 & 1912.) the Russian Derby four times, the Czar's Prize on three occasions, (Note: Winfield won the Emperor's Prize, also known as the Czar's Prize, in 1905, 1907 & 1916.) and the Warsaw Derby twice. (Note: Winfield won the Warsaw Derby in 1904 & 1905.)

The Russian Revolution caused him to leave the country in 1917, and he led an evacuation of 260 racehorses of the most valuable bloodlines from Odesa, Ukraine, trekking for three months on horseback to Warsaw, about 1,000 miles. Only 8–10 horses were lost on the journey. (Note: Drape tells of 262 horses leaving Odesa and 252 arriving at Warsaw. Hotaling mentions 260 and 252.) (Note: Jockeys and racehorses in Russia routinely traveled seasonally between Moscow and St. Petersburg, sometimes by train and sometimes by foot. In 1915, Polish horseman Frederick Jurjevich, who was involved in racing in Warsaw, St Petersburg and Moscow, turned Odessa, Ukraine from a minor to a major racing center as an oasis away from the war fronts. Horse owners had been sending their racehorses to Odessa, and Winkfield was part of the migratory racing scene. In April 1917, the racing season was in Odessa when advancing troops reached the city.)

Around 1920, he moved to France where he resumed racing, scoring numerous wins including the 1922 Prix Eugène Adam, the 1922 Grand Prix de Deauville, and the 1923 Prix du Président de la République.

Winkfield had successful racing careers in Poland, Russia, Germany, Austria, Hungary, and France.

He raced until 1930 when—at the age of fifty and with more than 2,600 wins to his credit—he began a second successful career as a horse trainer in France. Winkfield lived on a farm near the Maisons-Laffitte Racecourse on the outskirts of Paris. He remained there until 1941 when Nazis took over his horse farm, after which he traveled to Lisbon and then to New York. In 1953, he returned to the farm at Maisons-Laffitte where he lived until his death on March 23, 1974.

== Legacy and honors ==
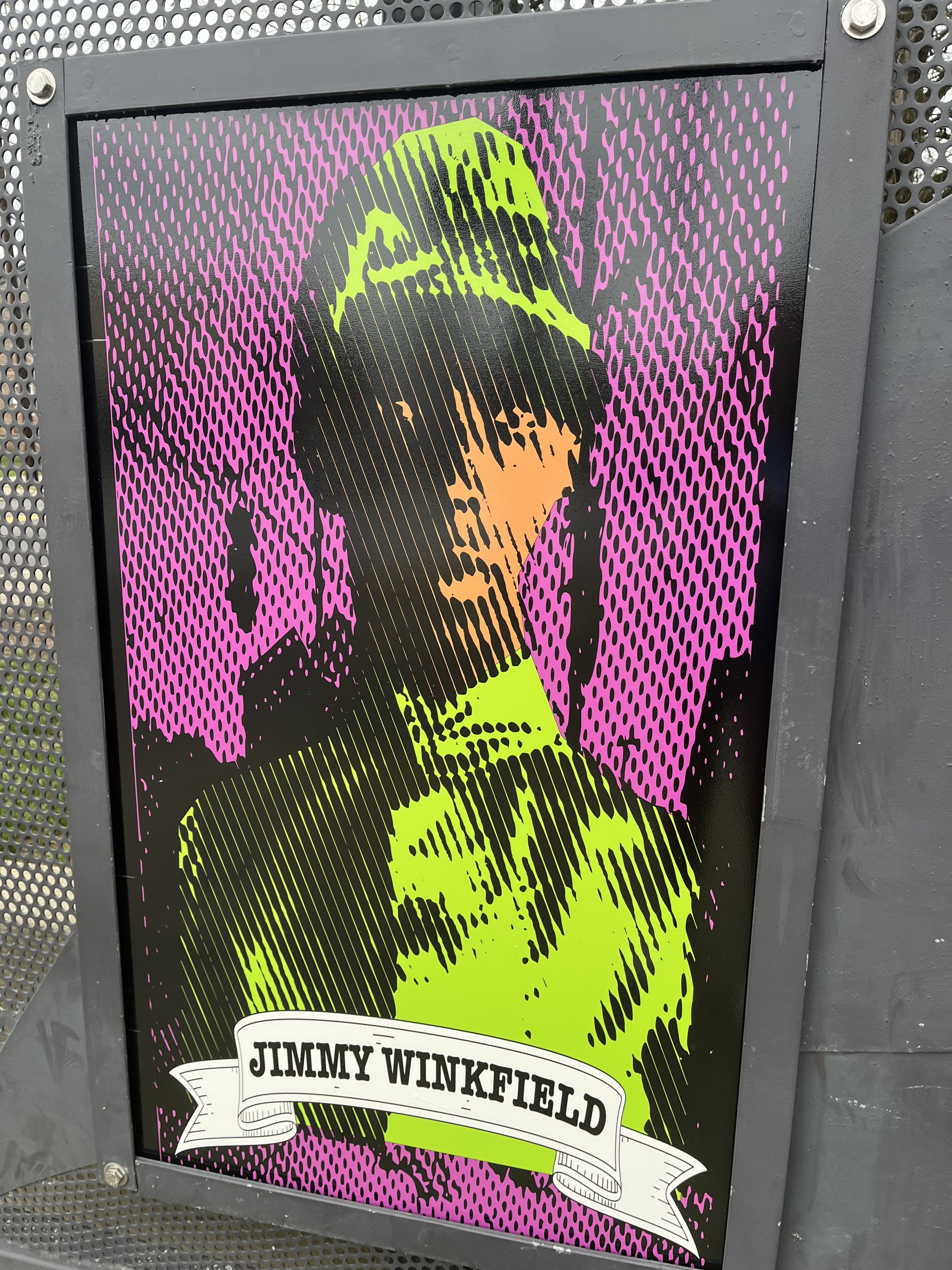
Public art of Winkfield on display at Third and Elm Tree Lane in Lexington, Kentucky

In the US, Winkfield is remembered as the last African American to ride a winner in the Kentucky Derby (1902).

While he was treated with respect in Europe, segregation still ruled American society. When Sports Illustrated invited Winkfield to a reception at the Brown Hotel in Louisville in 1961, he was told he could not enter by the front door. He was admitted after the magazine explained that he was an invited guest. Winkfield made an appearance at the Kentucky Derby that year to celebrate 60 years since his historic victories.

In 2004, he was inducted posthumously into the National Museum of Racing and Hall of Fame. The Jimmy Winkfield Stakes at Aqueduct Racetrack is run in his honor. In 2005, the United States House of Representatives passed a resolution honoring Winkfield. The full details can be read at the National Museum of Racing and Hall of Fame.
