= McChesney =

McChesney is a surname. Notable people with the surname include:

- Bill McChesney (politician) (born 1948), American Democratic Party member of the Montana House of Representatives.
- Bill McChesney (athlete) (1959–1992), American long-distance runner
- Bob McChesney, American jazz and studio trombonist
- Bob McChesney (American football, born 1912) (1912–1986), American football player
- Bob McChesney (American football, born 1926) (1926–2002), American football player
- Ernest McChesney (1912–1991), American tenor who had an active singing career in operas musicals, and concerts
- H. D. McChesney (1895–1954), American football coach for Emporia State University
- Iain McChesney, Scottish football (soccer) player
- Matt McChesney (1981), American football guard for the Denver Broncos of the National Football League
- Michael McChesney (born 1955), American founding partner of Five Paces Ventures
- Robert McChesney (disambiguation)
- William McChesney Martin, Jr. (1906–1998), American longest-serving Chairman of the United States Federal Reserve
