= 2006 Breeders' Cup Classic =

Thoroughbred horse race

23rd Breeders' Cup Classic
- Breeders' Cup Classic
- Location: Churchill Downs
- Date: November 4, 2006
- Winning horse: Invasor
- Jockey: Fernando Jara
- Trainer: Kiaran McLaughlin
- Owner: Shadwell Stable
- Conditions: Fast
- Surface: Dirt
- Attendance: 75,132

The 2006 Breeders' Cup Classic (in full, the Breeders' Cup Classic Powered by Dodge, due to sponsorship) was the 23rd running of the Breeders' Cup Classic, part of the 2006 Breeders' Cup World Thoroughbred Championships program. It was run on November 4, 2006, at Churchill Downs in Louisville, Kentucky.

Invasor, an Argentinian-bred four-year-old who had won three Grade I stakes in the U.S. in 2006, was the surprise winner, beating out the heavily favored Bernardini in the stretch. It was the first Classic win for Invasor's owner, trainer and jockey.

The Classic is run on dirt at one mile and one-quarter (approximately 2000 m) with a purse in 2006 of $5,000,000, increased from $4,000,000 in 2005. It is run under weight-for-age conditions, with entrants carrying the following weights:

- Northern Hemisphere three-year-olds: 122 lb
- Southern Hemisphere three-year-olds: 117 lb
- Four-year-olds and up: 126 lb

== Contenders ==
There were 13 entries in the race. The even money favorite was the three-year-old colt Bernardini, who had won six straight races including the Preakness, Travers and Jockey Club Gold Cup. Bernardini, owned by Sheikh Mohammed's Godolphin Stable, assumed the leadership of the three-year-old division after Barbaro's breakdown in the Preakness, and needed to win the Classic to wrap up Horse of the Year honors.

Lava Man was the second favorite. The five-year-old gelding had won seven straight races in California, including the Santa Anita Handicap, Hollywood Gold Cup, Pacific Classic and Goodwood Breeders' Cup Handicap. He too had a chance at Horse of the Year honors if he could win outside of his home state, something he had never done.

Invasor was the third favorite at nearly 7:1, somewhat overlooked despite having lost only one race in his career. He was bred in Argentina and won the Uruguayan Triple Crown, which caught the eye of Sheikh Hamden, Sheikh Mohammed's brother. Sheikh Hamden bought Invasor for Shadwell Stables and transferred him to trainer Kiaran McLaughlin. Invasor lost his first and only race when moved to Dubai, then shipped to the United States where he won the Pimlico Special, Suburban and Whitney. McLaughlin intended to race the colt in the Jockey Club Gold Cup, but missed it due to illness, meaning Invasor had not raced in nearly three months leading up to the Classic. Invasor had to be nominated to the Breeders' Cup as a horse of racing age at a cost of $250,000 (normally horses are nominated as foals at a much lower cost).

George Washington, considered Europe's best miler, was entered in the Classic, despite never having run on the dirt. Trainer Aidan O'Brien said, "We know he would have been short-priced favorite for the Mile, but winning the Classic would open the whole world to him." David Junior was another European-based horse entered in the Classic. He had excellent form at a mile and a quarter but was coming into the Classic off a five-month layoff.

Other entries included Brother Derek, winner of the Santa Anita Derby, Premium Tap, winner of the Woodward Stakes, Lawyer Ron, winner of the Super Derby, Perfect Drift, racing in the Classic for a record fifth time, Giacomo, the 2005 Kentucky Derby winner and Flower Alley, 2nd in the 2005 Classic.

== Race description ==
Brother Derek took the early lead and set a brisk pace, followed by Lawyer Ron and Lava Man. Bernardini raced on the outside down the backstretch and started his move around the far turn. He assumed the lead at the head of the stretch, brushing Brother Derek as he went by. A later claim of foul by Brother Derek's jockey was disallowed. Although in front, Bernardini appeared to be struggling with the track and his jockey went to the whip.

Meanwhile, Invasor raced on the outside of the pack during the early part of the race then made a strong move, drawing even with Bernardini with a sixteenth of a mile remaining. Bernardini attempted to fight back but Invasor drew away to win by a length in the time of 2:02.18.

Although Sheikh Hamdan watched the race from Dubai, Invasor's former owner Pablo Hernandez was present at Kentucky to celebrate in the winner's circle. "This is unbelievable," he said. "This is the greatest experience of my life, and always will be. Invasor is still in the hearts of everyone in Uruguay. We are a small, modest country, and we need an idol. We have no idol in football and no idol in politics. Invasor is the idol of Uruguay. He is the 'Horse of the Rio de la Plata'."

The win made Invasor's jockey, Fernando Jara, the youngest to ever win a Breeders' Cup race. It was the first Breeders' Cup win for McLaughlin as well.

"I'm not disappointed at all. You can't win all the races," said Javier Castellano, the jockey of Bernardini. "I had to ask him for the first time today. He passed the other horses easily. He gave me everything. He's a fighter and didn't want to get beat."

The main track at Churchill Downs came in for some criticism. Invasor was one of the few horses that day to win on the dirt from the outside – four earlier races on the dirt had all been won by horses running on the rail, including several large upsets. The final half-mile of the Classic was run in over 51 seconds, a slow time perhaps also indicative of a track bias given that both Invasor and Bernardini were running away from the rail.

== Results ==
Finish	Program Number	Margin (lengths)	Horse	Jockey	Trainer	Final Odds	Winnings
1st	11	1	Invasor (ARG)	Fernando Jara	Kiaran McLaughlin	6.70	2,700,000
2nd	3	2 1/2	Bernardini	Javier Castellano	Thomas Albertrani	1.10	1,000,000
3rd	2	1	Premium Tap	Edgar Prado	John Kimmel	27.80	500,000
4th	9	1/2	Giacomo	Mike Smith	John Shirreffs	21.40	255,000
5th	1	2	Brother Derek	Alex Solis	Dan Hendricks	22.50	125,000
6th	4	6 3/4	George Washington (IRE)	Michael Kinane	Adian O'Brien	9.40	
7th	8	head	Lava Man	Corey Nakatani	Doug O'Neill	6.10	
8th	6	1/2	Perfect Drift	Garrett Gomez	Murray Johnson	34.30	
9th	5	3/4	Lawyer Ron	Patrick Valenzuela	Todd Pletcher	20.20	
10th	13	1 1/2	Sun King	Rafael Bejarano	Nicholas Zito	19.70	
11th	10	25 1/4	Flower Alley	John Velazquez	Todd Pletcher	35.50	
12th	12	-	Suave	Kent Desormeaux	Paul McGee	59.00	
DNF	7		David Junior	Jamie Spencer	Brian Meehan	14.30	

Source: Equibase Times: 1/4 – 0:23.13; 1/2 – 0:46.60; 3/4 – 1:11.11; mile – 1:36.59; final – 2:02.18.
Fractional Splits: (:23.13) (:23.47) (:24.51) (:25.48) (:25.59)

== Payout ==
Payout Schedule:

Program Number	Horse	Win	Place	Show
11	Invasor	15.40	5.80	4.60
3	Bernardini		3.40	3.00
2	Premium Tap			8.80

- $2 Exacta (11–3) Paid $39.60
- $2 Trifecta (11–3–2) Paid $695.20
- $2 Superfecta (11–3–2–9) Paid $8,786.20
