= Gran Premio Nacional =

Gran Premio Nacional may refer to any one of several horse races:

- Gran Premio Nacional (Argentina)
- Gran Premio Nacional (Uruguay)
