= Gran Premio Polla de Potrillos =

Gran Premio Polla de Potrillos or Polla de Potrillos may refer to any one of several horse races:

- Gran Premio Polla de Potrillos (Argentina)
- Gran Premio Polla de Potrillos (Uruguay)
