= Gran Premio Jockey Club =

Gran Premio Jockey Club may refer to any one of several horse races:

- Gran Premio Jockey Club (Argentina)
- Gran Premio Jockey Club (Uruguay)
