= Robert McChesney =

Robert McChesney may refer to:

- Robert D. McChesney (born 1944), scholar on the history of Central Asia, Iran, and Afghanistan
- Robert P. McChesney (1913–2008), California artist
- Robert W. McChesney (1952–2025), American media theorist and author
- Bob McChesney, jazz trombonist
- Bob McChesney (American football, born 1912) (1912–1986), American football player
- Bob McChesney (American football, born 1926) (1926–2002), American football player
