= 2006 Breeders' Cup =

Thoroughbred horse racing event

The 2006 Breeders' Cup World Championships was the 23rd edition of the premier event of the North American thoroughbred horse racing year. It took place on November 4 at Churchill Downs in Louisville, Kentucky. The Breeders' Cup is generally regarded as the end of the North America racing season, although a few Grade I events take place in later November and December. The 2006 Breeders' Cup results were highly influential in the Eclipse Award divisional championship voting.

== Lead-up ==
For 2006, the total purse money offered at the Breeders' Cup increased from $14 million to $20 million. The Classic, Turf, Filly and Mare Turf, Sprint, and Juvenile Fillies all had their purses increased by $1 million. The Mile and Juvenile had their purse increased by $500,000. The purse increases made Breeders' Cup day the second richest in racing, behind Dubai World Cup day with total purses of $21 million.

The event was broadcast by ESPN for the first time, with Trevor Denman calling the races.

== Results ==
The heavy favorite for the Classic was Bernardini, who had won six straight races including the Preakness Stakes, Travers and Jockey Club Gold Cup. Next choice at 6:1 was Lava Man, who had a seven race winning streak in California. The third choice was Invasor, an Argentinian-bred colt who had won the Uruguayan Triple Crown before being purchased by Shadwell Stable and moved to Dubai then America, where he won three straight Grade I races. Invasor had lost only once in his career but had not run in the three months leading up to the Classic after spiking a fever. In the Classic, Bernardini hit the lead at the top of the stretch but Invasor closed rapidly in the center of the track, eventually winning by a length. Lava Man had a troubled trip and finished seventh. Invasor was named Champion Older Horse and Horse of the Year, while Bernardini was named Champion Three-Year-Old Male.

Ouija Board, who won the Filly & Mare Turf in 2004 then finished second in 2005, justified being the heavy favorite in the 2006 renewal with an "explosive" stretch run that swept her to a 2 1/4 length victory over Filmmaker. "I was very fortunate to have ridden her", said jockey Frankie Dettori. "She's the best filly in the world, without a doubt." The win made Ouija Board the leading money-earning female horse in history and earned her a second Eclipse Award for Champion Turf Female, despite having only the one start in America in 2006.

Street Sense won the Juvenile at odds of 15:1 by a record 10 lengths, sweeping from the back of the pack to first place with a strong move on the rail. Street Sense was named Champion Two-Year-Old colt at the Eclipse Awards and would later win the Kentucky Derby in similar fashion, breaking the so-called "Juvenile Curse" by becoming the first horse to win both races.

The Distaff was marred by injuries to the two favorites, Fleet Indian and Pine Island. Fleet Indian, who was later named Champion Older Female Horse, suffered a compound fracture in her left front fetlock, which was surgically repaired. Pine Island dislocated her left front ankle and had to be euthanized because of infection. Long-shot Round Pond won the race comfortably, though the celebration of her connections was muted. "I've been in that situation and nobody ever likes to see that happen," said her trainer Michael Matz, who had also been the trainer of Barbaro.

The Turf was won by Irish-bred Red Rocks, who was the longest shot of four European entries after losing his previous four races. He trailed behind a fast early pace then out-kicked Better Talk Now. Favored Hurricane Run, winner of the 2005 Prix de l'Arc de Triomphe, finished sixth.

Dreaming of Anna, Thor's Echo and Miesque's Approval, winners of the Juvenile Fillies, Sprint and Mile respectively, were also Eclipse Award winners in their respective divisions.

With so many longshots winning, the Pick 6 (which excluded the two Juvenile races) paid nearly $1.5 million. The attendance was 75,132, third highest in the history of the event. The parimutuel handle was $136,726,378 (common pool), including $18,259,971 bet on track, both records.

=== Summary ===
Race name	Sponsor	Distance/Surface	Conditions	Purse	Winner	Odds	Margin
Juvenile Fillies		1 1/16 miles - dirt	2-year-old fillies	$2 million	Dreaming of Anna	2.60	1 1/2 lengths
Juvenile	Bessemer Trust	1 1/16 miles - dirt	2-year-old colts & geldings	$2 million	Street Sense	15.20	10 lengths
Filly & Mare Turf	Emirates	1 3/8 miles - turf	Fillies & Mares 3 yrs+	$2 million	Ouija Board (GB)	1.40	2 1/4 lengths
Sprint	TVG Network	6 furlongs - dirt	3 yrs+	$2 million	Thor's Echo	15.60	4 lengths
Mile	NetJets	1 mile - turf	3 yrs+	$2 million	Miesque's Approval	24.30	4 lengths
Distaff	Emirates	1 1/8 miles - dirt	Fillies and mares 3 yrs+	$2 million	Round Pond	13.90	5 1/2 lengths
Turf	John Deere	1 1/2 miles - turf	3 yrs+	$3 million	Red Rocks (IRE)	10.80	1/2 lengths
Classic	Dodge	1 1/4 miles - dirt	3 yrs+	$5 million	Invasor (ARG)	6.70	1 length

Source: Equibase
