= Fernando Jara =

Panamanian jockey

Personal information
- Born: December 18, 1987 (age 38) Herrera, Panama
- Occupation: Jockey

Horse racing career
- Sport: Horse racing
- Career wins: 709 (ongoing)

Major racing wins
- Belmont Stakes (2006); Suburban Handicap (2006); Whitney Handicap (2006); Clasico del Caribe (2006); Donn Handicap (2007); Dubai World Cup (2007); Shirley Jones Handicap (2007); Marine Stakes (2007) Breeders' Cup wins: Breeders' Cup Classic (2006)

Significant horses
- Like Now, Jazil, Invasor
- Updated on March 20, 2007

Fernando Jara (born December 18, 1987, in Panama) is a Panamanian thoroughbred horse racing jockey who currently competes in the United States. Aboard Jazil he won the 2006 Belmont Stakes. In addition, he was the primary North American rider of 2006 American Horse of the Year Invasor, and rode him to victory in the 2006 Breeders' Cup Classic, 2007 Donn Handicap and 2007 Dubai World Cup.

| Chart (2006–present) | Peak position |
|---|---|
| National Earnings List for Jockeys 2006 | 16 |
| National Earnings List for Jockeys 2007 | 36 |
