= Warsaw Derby =

The Warsaw Derby is a race for three-year-old Thoroughbred race horses first run in 1874 at a racetrack in Warsaw, Poland. In addition to the purse money, the race winner receives the Prize of the President of the Republic of Poland.

The horses competing in the Warsaw Derby come from the countries associated in the Konferenz des Mitteleuropaeischen Turfs (KMET) organization. Beyond host Poland, the organization includes members from Austria, the Czech Republic, Hungary, Slovakia, and Slovenia.

Currently run at the Sluzewiec Racetrack in the Służewiec sector of the city of Warsaw, the original race course no longer exists and is now the site of the Pole Mokotowskie park.

== See also ==
- List of horse races
