= Grande Prêmio Princesa do Sul =

Stake race

Grande Premio Princesa do Sul is a traditional non-graded stake race, left-handed flat race for three-year-olds and up (3yo+) thoroughbreds in Brazil. It is a traditional horse race in dirt track in Brazil, raced since 1936. Disputed over (actually) 2,200 meters, at Hipodromo da Tablada, Pelotas. Race Day is March, Sunday, every year.

== Winners ==
YEAR - WINNER - (SIRE & DAM) - DISTANCE - 2nd PLACE, 3rd PLACE - TIME (in seconds)

2450mt :

Year	Winner	Sire	Dam	Dist	2nd place	3rd place	Time
1936	CABILEÑO	CAID	KABILLA	2450mt	VANIDOSO	SISTRO	154s1/5

2100mt :

Year	Winner	Sire	Dam	Dist	2nd place	3rd place	Time
1937	MARIANO	ENZO	LA PINTA	2.100mt	QUEÑI	MARROEIRO	132s
1938	YONOSE	YEOMANSTOWN	MUY LINDA	2100mt			131s1/5
1939	ZAPACAI	-	-	2100mt			132s2/5
1940	DANUBIO	PANTERA	DESDENOSA	2100mt	ITAIPU (dh)		133s4/5
1941	EL GLORIOUS	EL CATORCE	VALENTINA	2100mt			131s2/5
1942	REALCE	RADIANCE	VIOLETA DOBLE	2100mt			132s
1943	EN PUERTA	YEOMANSTOWN	EN TRES	2100mt			132s2/5
1944	LISTO	-	-	2100mt			136s
1945	MANDARIAGA	-	-	2100mt	GULLIVER		133s1/5
1946	MANICOMIO	BABER SHAH	MI RAPAZA	2100mt			134s2/5
1947	HALCON NEGRO	ROLANDO	JURUNA	2100mt	MANDARIAGA	ESDEDOS	132s 2/5
1948	SOMMELIER	PONT LEVEQUE	LA CAVE	2100mt			132s
1949	BANFIELD	MENESTRELLO	BELTZA	2100mt			133s
1950	REGANO	IPE	RECAIDA	2100mt	CRAVETE	RIFLE	131s
1951	ZORRON	-	-	2100mt			132s4/5
1952	RECIO	ROMANTICO	FATALISTA	2100mt	LUCERN	QUATORZE DE JULHO	132s
1953	DANSARINO	NEW YEAR	MARL	2100mt			132s4/5

3000mt :

Year	Winner	CY	Sire	CY	Dam	CY	Dist	2nd place	3rd place	Time
1954	CARICIA	Argentina	SAINT FILLAN	France	CALLEJERA	Argentina	3000mt			193s2/5
1955	MURITI	Brazil	MEULEN	Argentina	-		3000mt			194s2/5
1956	KAYAK	Brazil	FELICITATION	United Kingdom	KOPAIS	France	3000mt			193s4/5
1957	GATO MONTEZ		-		-		3000mt			194s2/5
1958	MY KING	Argentina	MY LORD	Argentina	MAR CHIQUITA	Argentina	3000mt			194s1/5
1959	DEPUTADO		-		-		3000mt			196s1/5
1960	COMPONENTE		-		-		3000mt	LORD CHANEL		196s2/5
1961	STAR MARON	Argentina	BALCON	Argentina	MARON STAR	Argentina	3000mt		MONTIGO	198s1/5
1962	LORD CHANEL	Brazil	LORD ANTIBES	France	ALMA DE OURO	Argentina	3000mt			197s
1963	UBAIBAS	Brazil	BLACKAMOOR	Argentina	FARRISTA	Brazil	3000mt			199s4/5
1964	FIREBIRD	Brazil	AWAY	Argentina	CARISSIMA	Brazil	3000mt	FILBAS		197s
1965	INVITADA	Uruguay	RIGOBERTO	United Kingdom	SOCIABLE	Uruguay	3000mt		TEM TEMPO	197s

2300mt :

Year	Winner	CY	Sire	CY	Dam	CY	Dist	2nd place	3rd place	Time
1966	CALLAO	Uruguay	CASTIGO	Argentina	CALLEJUELA	Uruguay	2300mt			147s3/5
1967	TURISMO	Argentina	SIMPSON	Argentina	ORANGE BLOSSOM	Argentina	2300mt			146s /5
1968	race not run									
1969	GOBELIM	Brazil	FASTENER	France	BALLADE	Brazil	2300mt	KING TWIST		146s
1970	KING SCOTCH	Brazil	TAKT	Germany	DROSERA	Brazil	2300mt	KING TWIST		147s
1971	GADITANO	Argentina	YAL	Argentina	GUERRILLA	Argentina	2300mt			151s2/5
1972	LEXICON	Brazil	ULTRA	Brazil	LA DERNIERE	Uruguay	2300mt			145s
1973	MENSAJERO	Uruguay	PENTAPOLIN	Uruguay	MUNEQUITA	Uruguay	2300mt			146s
1974	CHILENO	Brazil	CANDANGO	Brazil	DAJA	Brazil	2300mt			146s4/5
1975	LOCOMOTOR	Argentina	LACYDON	United Kingdom	RETORICA	Argentina	2300mt			147s1/5
1976	DON TIBAGI	Brazil	DON BOLINHA	Brazil	DAMA DA NOITE	Brazil	2300mt			148s
1977	SUNNY JOE		-		-		2300mt			143s
1978	PAKITO		-		-		2300mt			144s
1979	REIDE	Brazil	WALDMEISTER	United Kingdom	JABA	Brazil	2300mt			146s
1980	SANG-CHAUD	Brazil	VASCO DE GAMA	France	SANG FROID	Brazil	2300mt	ALNOR	NEGOCIAO	150s
1981	LUSI	Brazil	ORTILE	Brazil	SUCIA	Brazil	2300mt			149s
1982	HELICOPTERO	Brazil	ZALUAR	Brazil	BIOTITA	Brazil	2300mt			147s
1983	ENGATE	Brazil	ULEANTO	Brazil	GALANGA	Brazil	2300mt			147s4/5
1984	EDICION	Brazil	SELIM	France	EDILUNA	Brazil	2300mt			150s
1985	LIFE BELT	Brazil	ARNALDO	Brazil	OIAMPI	Brazil	2300mt			147”2/5
1986	VIAVEL	Brazil	WALDMEISTER	United Kingdom	MISTOME	France	2300mt			148"2/5
1987	NARRAGANSET	Brazil	HANG TEN	United States	LA REATA	France	2300mt			147s
1988	PONCHE VILLE	Brazil	HEAD TABLE	United States	PHILANTA	Argentina	2300mt			147”

2100mt :

Year	Winner	CY	Sire	CY	Dam	CY	Dist	2nd place	3rd place	Time
1989	KEAGRAVO	Brazil	BAR GOLD	Brazil	HAY GURIA	Brazil	2100MT			133s4/5
1990	LESTEUR	Brazil	KONIGSSEE	Germany	ELIDORA	Brazil	2100MT			137s
1991	FOUR MILLION	Brazil	GHADEER	France	TERINA	Brazil	2100MT			133s
1992	BALLON ROUGE	Brazil	EXECUTIONER	United States	NEAR YOU	Brazil	2100MT			134s
1993	IPAO	Brazil	COPELAN	United States	BELLA SOLA	Ireland	2100MT			131s
1994	JACK JONES	Brazil	SHARANNPOUR	Ireland	DAME DE BEAUTE	Brazil	2100MT			134s
1995	CHECK CONTROL	Brazil	IMPRUDENT	Brazil	LARK DIORAMIM	Brazil	2100MT			135s
1996	CANADIAN HOPE	Brazil	DESPACITO	Brazil	BOTICA	Brazil	2100MT			136s1/5
1997	BIG KADU	Brazil	ROBA FINA	Ireland	BIG PITUCA	Brazil	2100MT			134s
1998	INDULGENTE	Brazil	ROBA FINA	Ireland	LA VORIA	Argentina	2100MT	GUAPA MOZA	CHE LAZY	136s
1999	JOHN TROYANOS	Brazil	TROYANOS	Brazil	SWEET CANDLE	Brazil	2100MT			138s1/5
2000	RYDER CUP	Brazil	GHADEER	France	DOUCE CHRIS	Ireland	2100mt	TIME SWITCH	ASICS NIGHT	134s4/5
2001	AUTOBELLE	Brazil	CLACKSON	Brazil	KEVENCE	Brazil	2100mt	CHE LAZY	KALIDANZ	137s4/5
2002	HARD BACK	Brazil	EXILE KING	United States	LATE CONTROL	Brazil	2100mt	AUTOBELLE	SWISS KNIFE	134s3/5
2003	GANGES RIVER	Brazil	CLACKSON	Brazil	MISS DANI	Ireland	2100mt	GUAPO DOS PAMPAS	ZECOLMEIA	137s3/5
2004	IMMINENT DANGER	Brazil	FALCON JET	Brazil	ELEGANT PROVINCIA	United States	2100mt	ULUAR	HARD BACK	134s1/5
2005	HEY WILLIE	Brazil	OUR CAPTAIN WILLIE	United States	DAMA DA PISTA	Brazil	2100mt	LUMUMBA	EQUINOX	134s2/5
2006	UCRANE FALCON	Brazil	NOW LISTEN	United States	OUTSIDER DAME	Brazil	2100mt	MONTE GRIS	PISA ACELERADO	135s
2007	PISA ACELERADO	Brazil	MANE MINISTER	United States	PILAR BAY	Brazil	2100mt	JUMP BAIL	GUAPO DOS PAMPAS	135s
2008	OSBABADO	Brazil	NOTATION	United States	TONALIDADE	Brazil	2100mt	DUBAI	TALENTO MIL	134s3/5
2009	REALLY THE FIRST	Brazil	SHUDANZ	Canada	JUST THE FIRST	United States	2100mt	PEGADOR	WORLD DISORDER	136s1/5

2200mt

Year	Winner	CY	Sire	CY	Dam	CY	Dist	2nd place	3rd place	Time
2010	race not run	...........	..................................	............	..................................	..............	..............	....................................	................................	...............
2011	ASK ME NOT	Brazil	ARACAI	Brazil	ASSAI BELLA	Brazil	2200mt	GOOD FEELING	MESTRE CEU	140s
2012	THE ANGLER	Brazil	AMIGONI	Ireland	CHOICE SUSHI	Brazil	2200mt	ED MORT	REAL ESTATE	140s2/5
2013	JOINT CHIEF	Brazil	YAGLI	United States	JOINT DEGREE	Brazil	2200mt	ESCROW	HALLOX	141s
2014	KENTUCKY CROWN	Brazil	RED RUNNER	United States	PLEASANT TALE	United States	2200mt	CAAPUA	DESEJADO PUNK	144s
2015	NORTHLAND	Brazil	FIRST AMERICAN	United States	INDIA PEREGRINA	Brazil	2200mt	DESEJADO PUNK	PAPAO	142s
