= Andover Hills, Lexington =

Andover Hill
- Neighborhood of Lexington, Kentucky
- Location within Kentucky
- Coordinates: 37.9955°N 84.4133°W
- Country: United States
- State: Kentucky
- County: Fayette
- City: Lexington

Area
  - Total: 0.469 sq mi (1.21 km^{2})
  - Water: 0 sq mi (0.0 km^{2})

Population (2000)
  - Total: 1,143
  - Density: 2,436/sq mi (941/km^{2})
- Time zone: UTC-5 (Eastern (EST))
  - Summer (DST): UTC-4 (EDT)
- ZIP code: 40509
- Area code: 859

Andover Hills is a subdivision in southeastern Lexington, Kentucky, United States. Its boundaries are Todds Road to the east, Hays Boulevard to the south, Jacobson Park to the west, and Mapleleaf Park to the north. Schools in the district are Athens Chilesburg Elementary School, Edythe J. Hayes Middle School, and Henry Clay High School.

== Description ==
Andover Hills consists of brick homes built in the 1970s through 2011, as well as townhomes that were built in the 1990s. The townhomes built in the 1990s feature brick. Most houses have basements and home sizes that range from 2,000 to 7,000 square feet. The units have garages and no basements that range from 1,100 to 2,000 square feet.

== Neighborhood statistics ==
- Area: 0.469 square miles (1.21 km^{2})
- Population: 1,143
- Population density: 2,436 people per square mile
- Median household income: $61,004
