= Gran Premio José Pedro Ramírez =

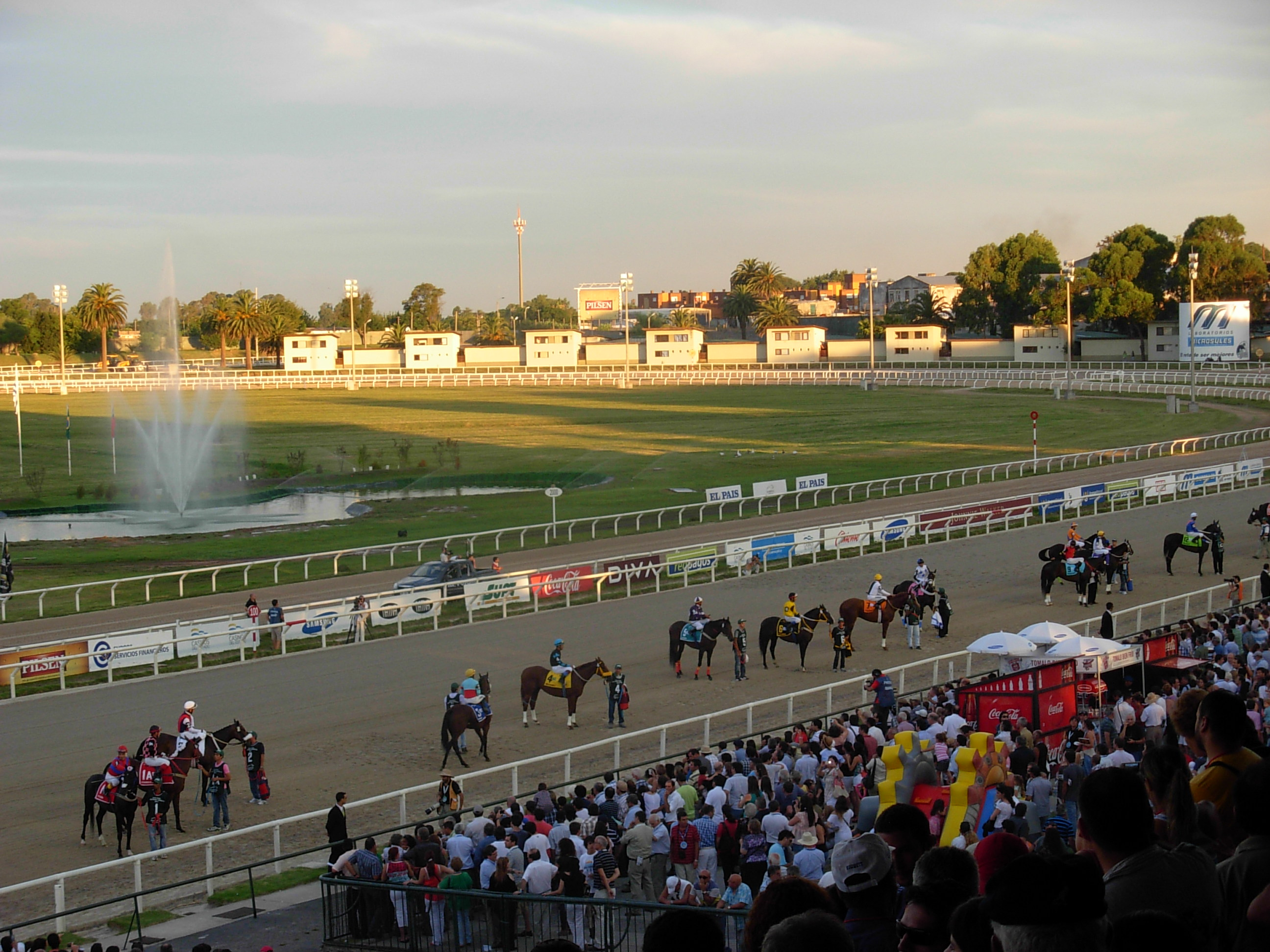
- Post parade of the 2013 Gran Premoi José Pedro Ramírez
- Class: Grade I
- Location: Hipódromo Nacional de Maroñas; Montevideo, Uruguay
- Inaugurated: 1889
- Race type: Thoroughbred, Flat racing

Race information
- Distance: 2,400 meters (approx. 1 1/2 miles; 12 furlongs)
- Surface: Dirt
- Track: Left-handed
- Qualification: 3-year-olds and up

The Gran Premio José Pedro Ramírez is a Group I flat race for three-year-olds and up, run over a distance of 2400 metres every January 6 in Hipódromo Nacional de Maroñas racetrack in Montevideo, Uruguay. It is considered the most important horse race in Uruguay and is one of the oldest in South America.

== History ==
The Gran Premio José Pedro Ramírez was first run in 1889 under the name Gran Premio Internacional. This name lasted until the 1915 edition, at which point it received its current name, after one of the founders of the Jockey Club of Uruguay.

From 1889 to 1904 and from 1921 to today, the race is run under weight-for-age conditions; between 1905 and 1920, it was run as a handicap.

The Gran Premio José Pedro Ramírez has been an internationally recognized Group One race since 2004.

In 2021, due to the COVID-19 pandemic, the Gran Premio José Pedro Ramírez could not be held on its usual date of January 6.

== Records ==
Speed record: (at current distance of 2400 meters)

- 2:27.42 – Ajuste Fiscal (2020)

Most wins:

- 2 – Camors (1892, 1893)
- 2 – Amsterdam (1912, 1913)
- 2 – Buen Ojo (1920, 1922)
- 2 – ¡Socorro! (1935, 1936)
- 2 – Romántico (1939, 1940)
- 2 – Sestao (1961, 1963)
- 2 – Hielo (2014, 2015)
- 2 – Gandhi di Job (2017, 2018)

Most wins by a jockey:

- 8 – Irineo Leguisamo (1926, 1929, 1931, 1936, 1937, 1945, 1955, 1962)
- 4 – Fernando Pérez (1899, 1903, 1904, 1905)
- 4 – Luis Ladorde (1909, 1910, 1912, 1913)

Most wins by a trainer:

- 4 – José de Giuli (1954, 1960, 1963)
- 4 – Pablo Gelsi (1959, 1973, 1977, 1980)
- 3 – Juan de la Cruz (1949, 1962, 1968)
- 3 – Francisco Maschio (1929, 1931, 1936)
- 3 – Gabriel Torterolo (1920, 1922)

Most wins by an owner:

- 3 – Stud Ana María (Enrique Guillemette) (1934, 1935, 1936)
- 3 – Stud Montiel (Adolfo Bullrich) (1912, 1913, 1918)

== Winners ==
Year	Winner	Age	Jockey	Trainer	Owner	Breeder	Distance	Time	Ref
2025	El Kodigo	4	Gustavo Calvente	Juan F. Saldivia	Stud Juan Antonio	Haras Marovi	2400 meters	2:30.78	
2024	Ever Daddy	3	William Pereyra	Juan F. Saldivia	Stud Tramo 20	Haras Abolengo	2400 meters	2:27.62	
2023	Roundofapplause	4	Javier Emanuel Pérez	Sebastián San Martín	Stud 3 de Enero	Haras Triple Alliance S A	2400 meters	2:30.09	
2022	Prelude Rye	3	Germán González	Pablo González	Stud Lucía Y Matías	Haras La Leyenda de Areco	2400 meters	2:30.41	
2021	Atlético El Culano	4	José Da Silva	Antonio Cintra	Haras Bagé do Sul	Haras Bagé do Sul	2400 meters	2:28.19	
2020	Ajuste Fiscal	3	Héctor Lazo	Antonio Cintra	Haras de la Pomme	Haras La Concordia	2400 meters	2:27.42	
2019	First Thing	3	Pablo Rodríguez	Pablo González	La Orden	Stud T N T	2400 meters		
2018	Gandhi di Job	4	Federico Píriz	Jorge Firpo	La Fe	Haras Curitibano	2400 meters	2:32.20	
2017	Gandhi di Job	3	Federico Píriz	Jorge Firpo	La Fe	Haras Curitibano	2400 meters	2:28.53	
2016	Fletcher	4	Luis Cáceres	Sandro Sánchez	Stud 3 de Enero	Haras Don Alfredo	2400 meters	2:29.44	
2015	Hielo	4	Julio C. Méndez	Alcides P. Perdomo	Coral Gables	Haras Di Cellius	2400 meters	2:27.97	
2014	Hielo	3	Eguard A. Tejera	Alcides P. Perdomo	Coral Gables	Haras Di Cellius	2400 meters	2:29.13	
2013	Imperrito	3	Fernando C. Olivera	Sebastián San Martín	Viernes Asado	Don Alfredo	2400 meters	2:29.97	
2012	Alcazar	5	Roni Von Souza	Elio A. Umpiérrez	Vida Nueva	Don Alfredo	2400 meters	2:30.28	
2011	Mr. Nedawi	6	José Aparecido	João G. Da Costa	Hole in One	Haras Old Friends	2400 meters	2:30.62	
2010	Sing-A-Song	4	Fernando C. Olivera	Pedro Hernández	Rincón de España	Haras Santa María de Araras	2400 meters	2:28.64	
2009	Relento	4	José M. Silva	Ubal N. Migues	Las Armas	Haras Cifra	2400 meters	2:30.03	
2008	Rock Ascot	3	Carlos S. Méndez	Hayne A. González	El Junior	Haras Gavroche	2400 meters	2:32.85	
2007	Good Report	3	Jorge A. Ricardo	Luis A. Belela	Santa Teresa	Haras Abolengo	2400 meters	2:27.84	
2006	Jampro	6	Waldemar Maciel	Raúl Cardozo	Antonella	Álvaro Vargas	2400 meters	2:29.52	
2005	Equipado	6	Gustavo J. Duarte	Wálter R. Báex	El Entrevero	Haras Abolengo	2400 meters	2:30.01	
2004	Bat Ruizero	5	Juan C. Noriega	Roberto Pellegatta	Doña Ana	Haras Los Cesares	2400 meters	2:33.23	
2003	Race not run								
2002	Race not run								
2001	Race not run								
2000	Race not run								
1999	Race not run								
1998	Race not run								
1997	Snow Foss	3	Irieno Tejera	Aníbal Cardozo	Radio Cristal	Haras La Horqueta	2400 meters	2:32 1/5	
1996	C'est Donzy	3	Jorge W. García	Walter Cuintiño	Haras Divisadero	Haras Divisadero	2400 meters	2:34 1/5	
1995	Vienese	3	Arturo Piñeyro	Pablo Cardoso	Divisa Blanca	Haras Don Alfredo	2400 meters	2:31 3/5	
1994	Riomar	3	Arturo Piñeyro	Rómulo López	Seis Gurieses	Haras Don Alfredo	2400 meters	2:31 2/5	
1993	Glitero	5	Gustavo J. Duarte	Hugo M. Pérez	Cadorna	Haras San Miguel	2400 meters	2:29 1/5	
1992	Gremlins	5	Luis Aceredo	Hayne González	I Fratelli	Haras San Miguel	2400 meters	2:29 3/5	
1991	Mercenario	3	Gustavo J. Duarte	Antonio H. Marsiglia	Caracas	Haras Don Alfredo	2400 meters	2:28 3/5	
1990	Galicio	4	Pablo G. Falero	Oscar Rouco	Haras San Miguel	Haras San Miguel	2400 meters	2:28 3/5	
1989	Amodeo	3	Mario Rodríguez	Luis Soria	Lourdes y Rubén	Haras Nabek	2400 meters	2:28 4/5	
1988	Octante	4	Vilmar Sanguinetti	Carlos R. Bianchi	S. de B.	B V P S. A.	2400 meters	2:30	
1987	Chapulin	3	Pablo G. Falero	Wálter R. Báez	Haras El Trébol	Haras El Trébol	2400 meters	2:31 2/5	
1986	Vivaz	4	Nelson González	Pedro Hernández	Victory	Haras Los Paraisos	2400 meters	2:29 3/5	
1985	Compadre	4	Jugo Camilo	Adolfo Gutiérrez	Haras El Bonete	Haras El Bonete	2400 meters	2:30	
1984	Strong Kid	3	Oscar Taramasco	Albérico Migues	Irish Clover	Haras Ojo de Agua	2400 meters	2:30 1/5	
1983	Clorhidratante	3	Miguel Sarati	Martín Gervasoni	Roloza	Haras La Biznaga	2400 meters	2:29 4/5	
1982	Duplex	4	Jorge García	Walfrido García	Haras Jupía	Roberto Grimaldi Seabra	2400 meters	2:28	
1981	Sunup	4	Ruben Laitán	José A. Lofiego	Ri-Ca		2400 meters	2:28 4/5	
1980	The Last	4	Wálter R. Báez	Pablo Gelzi	Haras Coqueiro Verde	Haras San Miguel	2500 meters	2:38 3/5	
1979	Braseante	4	Oscar Mansilla	Julio F. Penna	Golf Club		2800 meters	2:55 2/5	
1978	Vacilante	3	Aníbal D. Etchart	Juan E. Bianchi	R. L. L.	Haras La Biznaga	2800 meters	2:55 2/5	
1977	Cinzano	3	Carlos Gómez	Pablo Gelzi	Valor	Haras Yaguari	2800 meters	2:52 3/5	
1976	Janus	3	Oscar R. Domínguez	Luis A. Ferro	Haras Ojo de Agua	Haras Ojo de Agua	2800 meters	2:54	
1975	Snow Paramount	3	Héxtor Libré	Juan A. Maldotti	Luis Gerónimo		2800 meters	2:52 2/5	
1974	Flaminio	6	Gonzalo Rojas	Sabino Arias	Ajedrez	Haras Villegas	2800 meters	2:54 4/5	
1973	Cascabel	3	Wálter R. Báez	Pablo Gelsi	Vic-Vic	Haras El Chuy	2800 meters	2:56	
1972	Chupito	3	Vilmar Sanguinetti	Jorge A. Lema	Karina	Haras Los Muchachos	2800 meters	2:52 4/5	
1971	Papote	3	Héctor H. Artigas	Pascual H. Artigas	Mariela y Andrea		2800 meters	2:58 3/5	
1970	Sol de Noche	3	Luis Gallegos	José M. Ferro	Wyoming Angus Ranch	Haras Uruguay	2800 meters	2:53 4/5	
1969	Taurudun	3	Juan Camoretti	José L. Leguizamón	T. T.		2800 meters	2:53 3/5	
1968	Calcado	5	Julio Fajardo	Juan de la Cruz	Vic-Vic	Haras El Chuy	3000 meters	3:07 4/5	
1967	Race not run								
1966	Vit Reina ƒ	3	Guillermo S. Rivero	José M. Boquin	La Tita	Haras Dreanina	3000 meters	3:07 3/5	
1965	Bonetero	3	Pablo Tárrago	Francisco M. Retirado	Mari Ann		3000 meters	3:07 2/5	
1964	Niarkos	3	Juan Caballero	Francisco D. Vitale	Carlos Tomas	Haras de la Pomme	3000 meters	3:06 3/5	
1963	Sestao	5	Manuel de Santis	Enrique Mesías	El Pibe	Haras El Pelado	3000 meters	3:10 2/5	
1962	Arturo A.	4	Irineo Leguisamo	Juan de la Cruz	Mis Leones	Haras La Ortigas	3000 meters	3:08 2/5	
1961	Sestao	3	Ever Perdomo	Enrique Mesías	El Pibe	Haras El Pelado	3000 meters	3:07 2/5	
1960	Rivoli	5	Manuel de Santis	José de Giuli	Los Dos	Haras Casupá	3000 meters	3:08 1/5	
1959	Mi Tocayo	3	Ever Perdomo	Peblo Gelsi	Viento Norte	Haras Los Pingos	3000 meters	3:06 2/5	
1958	Anadino	3	Oscar Nardi	José Fregonese	Luxave		3000 meters	3:06 1/5	
1957	Tatán	4	Juan P. Artigas	Pedro González	Los Cerros	Hars Los Prados	3000 meters	3:03 2/5	
1956	Mangangá	5	Bonifacio Castro	Bernardo J. Callejas	Aconcagua		3000 meters	3:06	
1955	Jungle King	3	Irineo Leguisamo	Francisco Lacoste	Don Eustaquio		3000 meters	3:05 2/5	
1954	Aurreko	3	Gualberto Pérez	José de Giuli	El Zorzal	Haras Atahualpa	3000 meters	3:03	
1953	Pampita ƒ	3	Amancio D. Falcón	Rogelio Rodríguez	La Giralda		3000 meters	3:04 4/5	
1952	Bizancio	3	Andrés Batista	Luis Albornoz	Corcita		3000 meters	3:04	
1951	Sloop	3	Tolentino Espino	Juan Boga	Haras Atahualpa	Haras Atahualpa	3000 meters	3:10 3/5	
1950	Penny Post	4	Elías Antúnez	Guillermo Cervi	La Giralda	Haras Chapadmalal	3000 meters	3:04 2/5	
1949	Murano	4	Juan P. Artigas	Juan de la Cruz	White Post		3000 meters	3:07 3/5	
1948	Uranio	3	Isaúl Rey	Alberto Milia	General Rivera	Haras Ojo de Agua	3000 meters	3:03 4/5	
1947	Académico	3	Salvador L. Di Tomaso	Santiago Fuentes	Madriguano	Haras Stella Maris	3000 meters	3:09 2/5	
1946	Miron	3	Numan Lalinde	José S. Riestra	Bella Esperanza	Haras Casupá	3000 meters	3:07 2/5	
1945	Filon	4	Irineo Leguisamo	Juan Lapistoy	Upper Cut		3000 meters	3:06 2/5	
1944	Banderín	4	Máximo Acosta	Oscar Canay	Rio Parana	Haras San Ignacio	3000 meters	3:05 4/5	
1943	Profano	4	Numan Lalinde	Alberto Milia	Delta	J.A. & M. Martínez de Hoz	3000 meters	3:06 2/5	
1942	Lunar	3	Justino Batista	José S. Riestra	Bella Esperanza	Haras Casupá	3000 meters	3:03 2/5	
1941	Pellizco	3	Elías Antúnez	Angel Penna	Pajonal		3000 meters	3:04 4/5	
1940	Romántico	4	Asunción Avero	José Petraglia	El Refugio	Haras Casupá	3000 meters	3:06 4/5	
1939	Romántico	3	Alejandro López	José Petraglia	El Refugio	Haras Casupá	3000 meters	3:07 2/5	
1938	Camerino	4	Olegario Ruíz	Pedro Moreno	Tanglefoot	Haras El Pelado	3000 meters	3:05 3/5	
1937	Balbuco	4	Irineo Leguisamo	Emilio Ridella	La Susanita		2800 meters	2:52 1/5	
1936	¡Socorro!	4	Irineo Leguisamo	Francisco Maschio	Ana María	Haras Nacional	2800 meters	2:53 3/5	
1935	¡Socorro!	3	Justino Batista	Ricardo Rodríguez	Ana María	Haras Nacional	2800 meters	2:53	
1934	Scarone	5	Antonio Lofiego	Ricardo Rodríguez	Ana María	Haras Casupá	2800 meters	2:53 3/5	
1933	Origán	3	Jacinto Sola	Pedro Thompson	La Patria		2800 meters	2:51 1/5	
1932	Perlita ƒ	3	Josó I. Canal	Timoteo Altez	Goayabos	Haras Goayabos	2800 meters	2:56	
1931	Cocles	4	Irineo Leguisamo	Francisco Maschio	La Morena	Haras El Pelado	2800 meters	2:56 3/5	
1930	Perseus	3	Justino Batista	Pedro Díaz	García y García	Haras Hampton	2800 meters	2:54 4/5	
1929	Monserga ƒ	3	Irineo Leguisamo	Francisco Maschio	Stud El Turf	Sres. Quintana y Cia.	2800 meters	2:53	
1928	Maron	5	Emilio Ruíz	Angel Berro	Stud El Turf	Haras Los Cardos	2800 meters	2:55 1/5	
1927	Rubens	3	Ramón Pelletier	Naciano Moreno	J. C. Saavedra	Haras La Oriental	2800 meters	2:54 3/5	
1926	Zarpazo II	3	Irineo Leguisamo	Rosendo Aguino	Old Time	Haras La Elisa	2800 meters	2:56 3/5	
1925	Puritano	3	Modesto Altamiranda	Gilberto Carderón	Raynal	Haras Hampton	2800 meters	2:56	
1924	Sisley	3	Benjamin Gómez	Juan da Silva	Raynal	Haras Los Cardales	2800 meters	2:55 3/5	
1923	Mameluke	3	Máximo Acosta	José Bentancur	Ayacucho	Mr. Dario Anasagasti	2800 meters	2:55 3/5	
1922	Buen Ojo	5	Francisco Arcuri	Gabriel Torterolo	Benito Villanueva	Mr. Benito Villanueva and Mr. Miguel Alfredo Martinez de Hoz.	2800 meters	2:52 3/5	
1921	Palospavos	3	Domingo Torterolo	Juan Torterolo	Saturnino J. Unzué		2800 meters	2:57	
1920	Buen Ojo	3	Arnaldo Grassi	Gabriel Torterolo	Benito Villanueva	Mr. Benito Villanueva and Mr. Miguel Alfredo Martinez de Hoz.	2800 meters	2:58 2/5	
1919	Licas	4	Esteban Rodríguez	Eduviges Melo	Lotería	Haras Los Pinos	2800 meters	2:57 4/5	
1918	Saca Chispas	4	Máximo Acosta	Tomás Acosta	Montiel	Haras Las Ortigas	2800 meters	2:56	
1917	Belkiss ƒ	5	Manuel Tapia	Juan Carrera	Olimar	Haras El Moro	2800 meters	2:59	
1916	Oldiman	5	Pedro Batista	Juan Carrera	Oldiman	Haras El Moro	2800 meters	2:55	
1915	Pommery	4	Aureilo Baistroqui	Carlos Lupi	Zamora		2800 meters	3:00 1/5	
1914	Mojinete	4	Alfredo Navarro	Francisco Orezolli	Amianto	Haras Santa Rosa	2800 meters	2:56 3/5	
1913	Amsterdam	5	Luis Ladorde		Montiel	Haras Ojo de Agua	2800 meters	2:57 1/5	
1912	Amsterdam	4	Luis Ladorde		Montiel	Haras Ojo de Agua	2800 meters	2:55 1/2	
1911	Sarah Bernhardt ƒ	5	Roberto Mauro		Royal Hampton	Haras El Moro	2800 meters	2:57 1/2	
1910	Contacto	4	Luis Ladorde		For Ever		2500 meters	2:38 1/5	
1909	Black Prince	5	Luis Ladorde		Treinta y Tres	Cabaña Los Ceibos	2500 meters	2:38 4/5	
1908	Mentirosa ƒ	3	Vicente Fernández		5 de Abril	Haras Porrazo Chico	2500 meters	2:40	
1907	Fiscal	5	Esteban Rodríguez		Nautilus		2500 meters	2:42	
1906	Iguazu	4	Vicente Fernández		Iguazu	Haras Maria Luisa	2500 meters	2:40 3/5	
1905	Peligroso*	6	Fernando Pérez	Romero	La Mascota		2500 meters	2:39	
1904	Partícula ƒ	4	Fernando Pérez		Don Gonzalo	Haras Ojo de Agua	3000 meters	3:12 3/5	
1903	San Carlos*	4	Fernando Pérez		Teinta y Tres		3000 meters	3:12	
1902	Mesalina ƒ	3	Isabelino Díaz		Lagrange	Haras Nacional	3000 meters	3:15 2/5	
1901	Race not run								
1900	Race not run								
1899	Eureka*	3	Fernando Pérez	Tomás Guillén	Gordon		3000 meters	3:21	
1898	Montevideo II	5	Eduviges Melo	Tito Martínez	Montevideo		3000 meters	3:19	
1897	Imperio	4	Ramón Garrido	Martín Gonzalez	Colón	Haras Maria Luisa	3000 meters	3:13	
1896	Sebastopol	5	Isidro de la Cruz	Isidro Sánchez	Belgrano	Haras La Cuamalán	3000 meters	3:12 2/5	
1895	Race not run								
1894	Reverie ƒ*	4	Isidro Sánchez	Tomás Guillén	Progreso	Haras Las Rosas	3000 meters	3:14	
1893	Camors	5	Ramón Garrido	Isabelino Díaz	Stud Camors	Captain Bayley	3000 meters	3:14	
1892	Camors	4	Isabelino Díaz	Isabelino Díaz	Stud Camors	Captain Bayley	3000 meters	3:15 2/5	
1891	Guerrillero	4	Cárlos Vale	Pio Torterolo	Haras Las Rosas		2500 meters	2:43	
1890	Tilimuque ƒ	4	Manuel Poggio	Cárlos Vale	Charrúa	Haras La Curamalán	3500 meters	3:54 4/5	
1889	Havre	3	José Romay		E. Casal		3500 meters	3:55	
1889	Recuerdo*	4	José Verduri				3500 meters	3:55	

ƒ designates a filly or mare winner

* designates a not pure Thoroughbred
