= Bob McChesney (American football, born 1912) =

American football player (1912–1986)

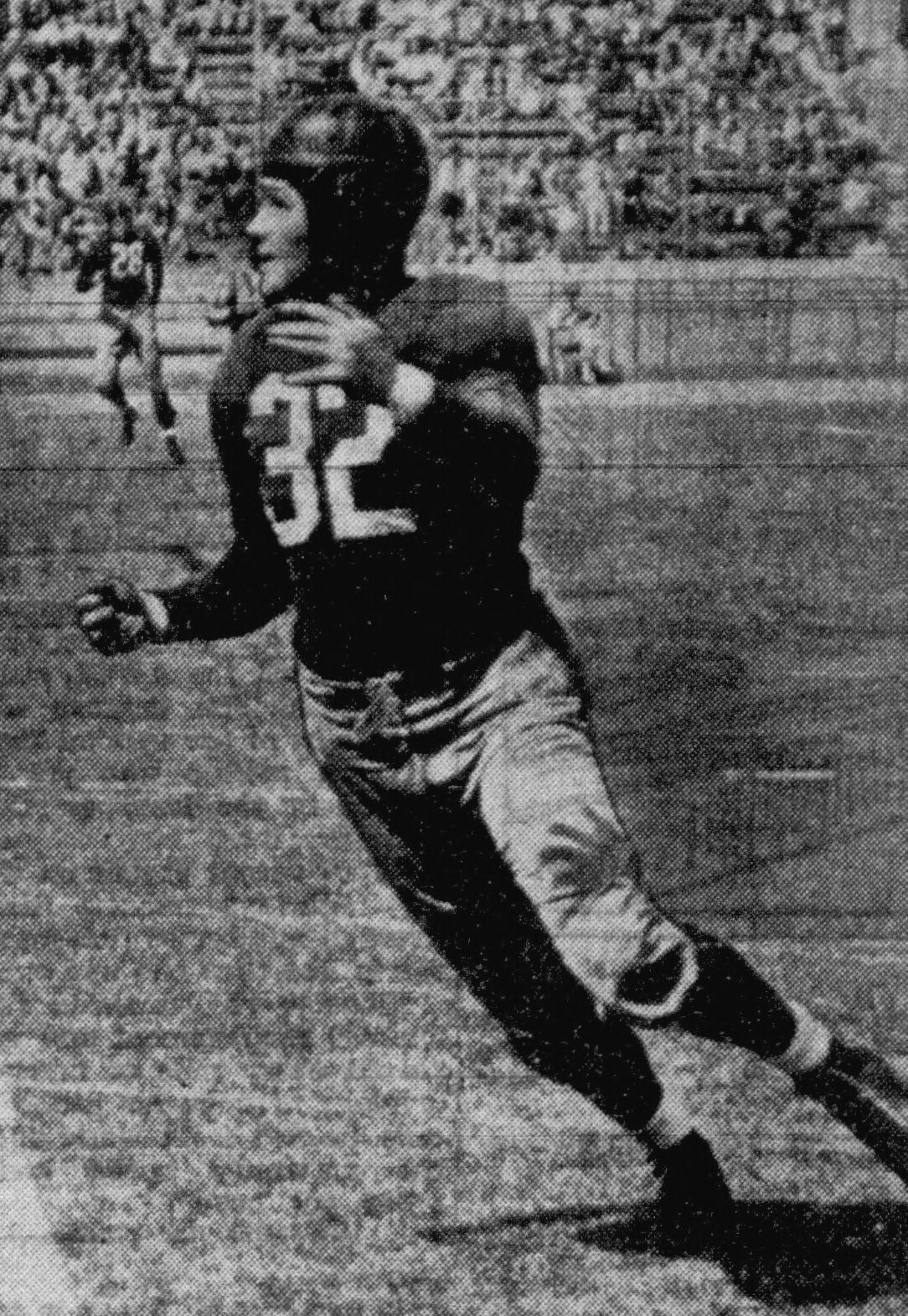
- McChesney in 1942

No. 32
- Position: End

Personal information
- Born: July 12, 1912; Los Angeles, California, U.S.
- Died: September 20, 1986 (aged 74); Denton, Texas, U.S.
- Listed height: 6 ft 2 in (1.88 m)
- Listed weight: 195 lb (88 kg)

Career information
- High school: Los Angeles (CA) Franklin
- College: UCLA

Career history
- Boston/Washington Redskins (1936–1942)

Awards and highlights
- 2× NFL champion (1937, 1942); 2× Pro Bowl (1938, 1942)
- Stats at Pro Football Reference

Robert Edward McChesney (July 12, 1912 – September 20, 1986) was an American football end in the National Football League (NFL) for the Boston/Washington Redskins. He played college football at the University of California, Los Angeles. He was selected to a Pro Bowl team on two occasions - in 1938 and in 1942. He was a member of the 1942 Redskins team that upset the undefeated Chicago Bears in the NFL Championship Game. Statistically, his best year as a pro was in 1941 when he had 19 receptions for 213 yards and 2 touchdowns.
