= Bob McChesney (American football, born 1926) =

American football player (1926–2002)

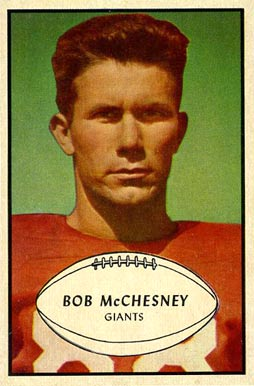
- McChesney on a 1953 Bowman football card

No. 88
- Position: End

Personal information
- Born: October 27, 1926; Los Angeles, California, U.S.
- Died: December 19, 2002 (aged 76); Granada Hills, California, U.S.
- Listed height: 6 ft 2 in (1.88 m)
- Listed weight: 190 lb (86 kg)

Career information
- High school: Van Nuys (Los Angeles)
- College: Hardin–Simmons (1946–1948)
- NFL draft: 1950: 4th round, 53rd overall pick

Career history
- Philadelphia Eagles (1950)*; New York Giants (1950–1952)
- * Offseason or practice squad member only

Career NFL statistics
- Receptions: 54
- Receiving yards: 1,040
- Touchdowns: 14
- Stats at Pro Football Reference

Robert Eugene McChesney (October 27, 1926 – December 19, 2002) was an American professional football offensive end who played three seasons with the New York Giants of the National Football League (NFL). He was selected by the Philadelphia Eagles in the fourth round of the 1950 NFL draft after playing college football at Hardin–Simmons University.

== Early life and college ==
Robert Eugene McChesney was born on October 27, 1926, in Los Angeles, California. He attended Van Nuys High School in Los Angeles.

He lettered for the Hardin–Simmons Cowboys from 1946 to 1948.

== Professional career ==
McChesney was selected by the Philadelphia Eagles in the fourth round, with the 53rd overall pick, of the 1950 NFL draft. He signed with the Eagles but was released later in 1950.

McChesney then signed with the New York Giants and played in 12 games, starting four, for the team during the 1950 season, catching 19 passes for 380 yards and six touchdowns. He led the Giants in both receiving yards and receiving touchdowns. He also appeared in one playoff game that season, a start in which he caught a 19-yard pass. McChesney started all 12 games for the Giants in 1951, recording 14 receptions for 230 yards and two touchdowns. He started all 12 games again in 1952, catching 21 passes for 430 yards and six touchdowns. He led the team in both receiving yards and receiving touchdowns for the 1952 season. McChesney became a free agent after the 1952 season.

== Personal life ==
McChesney died on December 19, 2002, in Granada Hills, California.
