= Gran Premio Polla de Potrillos (Uruguay) =

The Gran Premio Polla de Potrillos is a Group III flat race for three-year-old colts and geldings, run over a distance of 1600 metres every September in Maroñas racetrack in Montevideo, Uruguay. It is the first leg (together with the Polla de Potrancas) of the Uruguayan Triple Crown for three-year-olds.
