= Gran Premio Jockey Club (Uruguay) =

The Gran Premio Jockey Club is a Group I flat race for three-year-olds, run over a distance of 2000 metres every October in Maroñas racetrack in Montevideo, Uruguay. It is the second leg of the Uruguayan Triple Crown for three year-olds.

== Bibliography ==
- Results of the G. P. Jockey Club
