= Gran Premio Nacional (Uruguay) =

The Gran Premio Nacional is a Group II flat race for three-year-olds, run over a distance of 2500 metres every November in Maroñas racetrack in Montevideo, Uruguay. It is the third leg of the Uruguayan Triple Crown for three year-olds.

== Bibliography ==
- Results
