= Hipodromo Nacional de Maroñas =

Horse racing venue in Montevideo, Uruguay

Coordinates: 34.839555°S 56.142926°W

Hipódromo Nacional de Maroñas
- Interactive map of Hipódromo Nacional de Maroñas
- Location: Ituzaingó
- Owned by: Grupo CODERE
- Date opened: 1874
- Course type: Flat

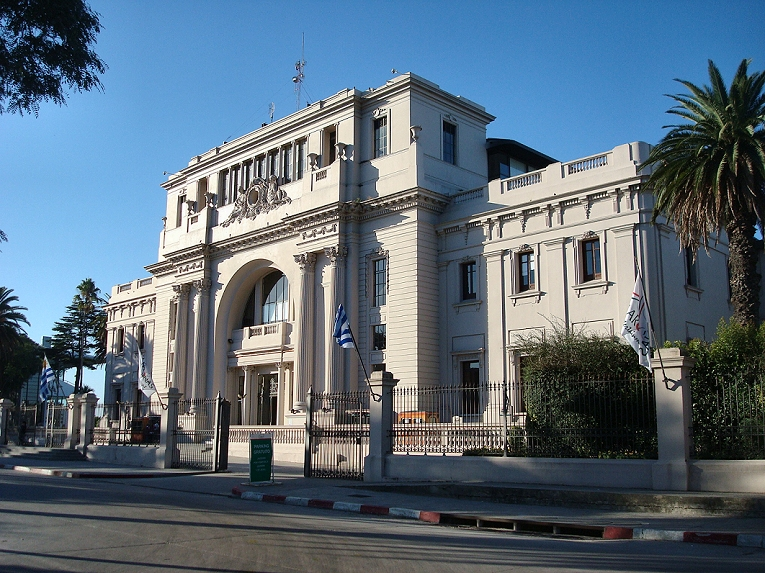
Hipódromo Nacional de Maroñas

Hipódromo Nacional de Maroñas is a horse racing track located in Ituzaingó neighbourhood, in Montevideo, Uruguay. It has a 2,065-metre (6,775 ft) main dirt track and a dirt 2,000-metre (6,600 ft) training track. It has a seating capacity of 2,426 people and can accommodate approximately 5,500 standing attendees. It has a parking lot with room for approximately 697 cars.

The racetrack was closed between 1997 and 2003, when it was reopened by a private consortium, Maroñas Entertainment.

Races take place all-year-round every weekend (mostly Saturdays and Sundays though sometimes on Fridays and Sundays or only on Sundays) and also every January 6 (Three Kings Day), when its most important race, the Gran Premio José Pedro Ramírez is held.

Maroñas has 25 races in the 2018 IFHA Blue Book Part 1, including three Group 1 races (Gran Premio José Pedro Ramírez, Gran Premio Ciudad de Montevideo and Gran Premio Latinoamericano), and four Group 2 races (Gran Premio Comparación, Gran Premio Criterium, Gran Premio Estímulo and Gran Premio General Artigas).

== Gallery ==
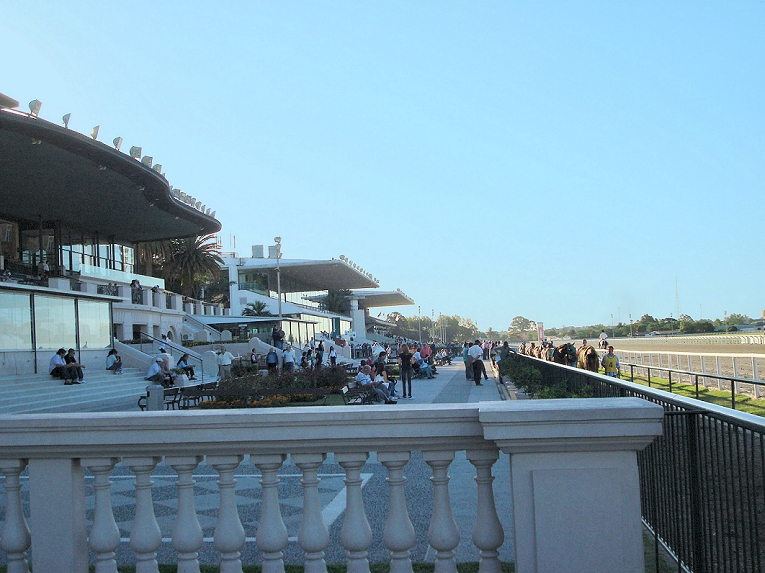

Victory of Impérrito at the 2013 Gran Premio José Pedro Ramírez

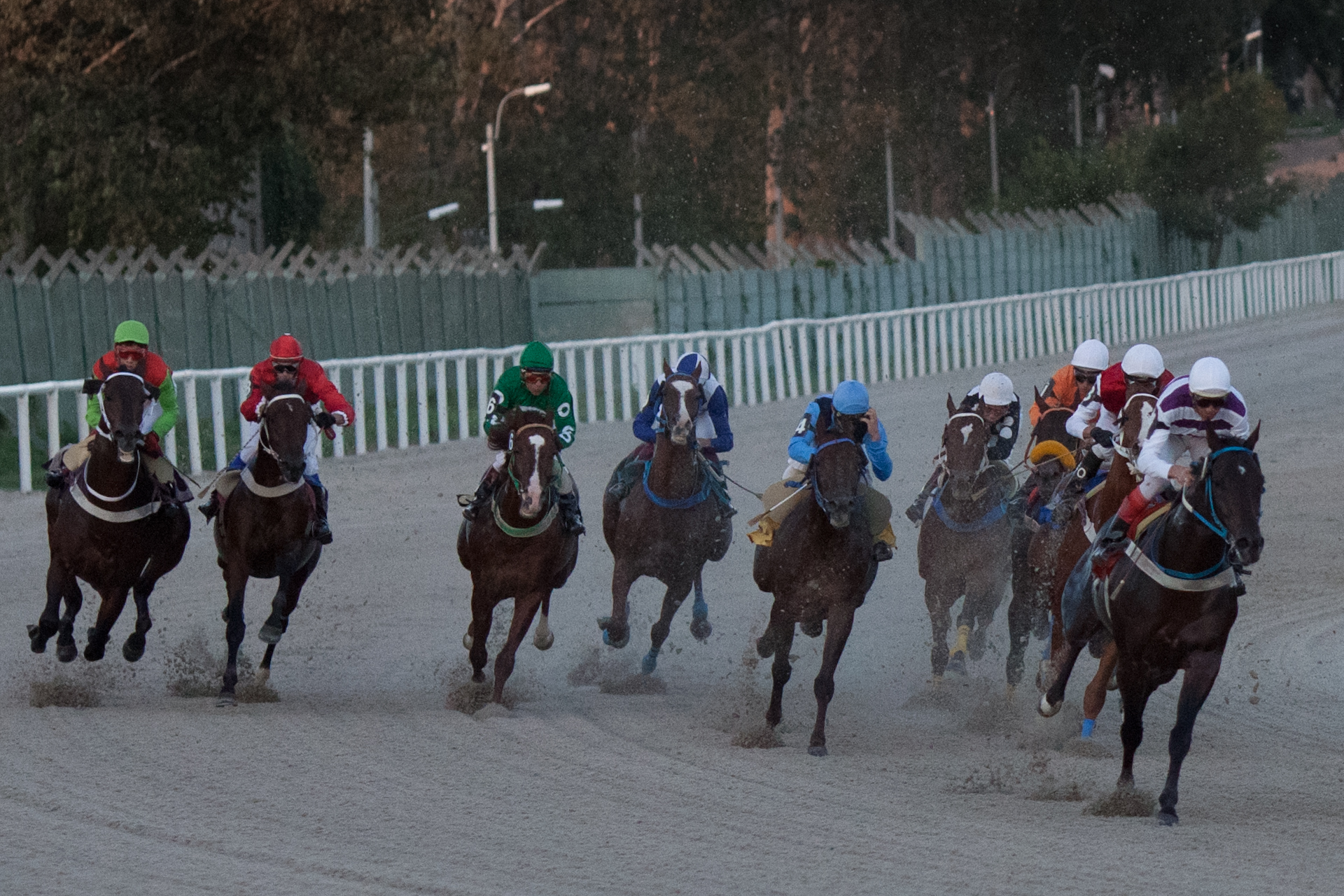
