= Breeders' Cup Mile top three finishers =

This is a listing of the horses that finished in either first, second, or third place and the number of starters in the Breeders' Cup Mile, a grade one race run on the grass held on Saturday of the Breeders' Cup World Thoroughbred Championships.

| Year | Winner | Second | Third | Starters |
|---|---|---|---|---|
| 2026 | Deterministic | Notable Speech | Lake Forest | 13 |
| 2025 | Notable Speech | Formidable Man | The Lion In Winter | 13 |
| 2024 | More Than Looks | Johannes | Notable Speech | 10 |
| 2023 | Master of The Seas | Mawj | Casa Creed | 13 |
| 2022 | Modern Games | Shirl's Speight | Kinross | 14 |
| 2021 | Space Blues | Smooth Like Strait | Ivar | 13 |
| 2020 | Order of Australia | Circus Maximus | Lope Y Fernandez | 14 |
| 2019 | Uni | Got Stormy | Without Parole | 13 |
| 2018 | Expert Eye | Catapult | Analyze It | 14 |
| 2017 | World Approval | Lancaster Bomber | Blackjackcat | 14 |
| 2016 | Tourist | Tepin | Midnight Storm | 14 |
| 2015 | Tepin | Mondialiste | Grand Arch | 12 |
| 2014 | Karakontie | Anodin | Trade Storm | 14 |
| 2013 | Wise Dan | Za Approval | Silentio | 10 |
| 2012 | Wise Dan | Animal Kingdom | Obviously | 9 |
| 2011 | Court Vision | Turallure | Goldikova | 13 |
| 2010 | Goldikova | Gio Ponti | The Usual Q. T. | 11 |
| 2009 | Goldikova | Courageous Cat | Justenuffhumor | 11 |
| 2008 | Goldikova | Kip Deville | Whatsthescript | 11 |
| 2007 | Kip Deville | Excellent Art | Cosmonaut | 11 |
| 2006 | Miesque's Approval | Aragorn | Badge of Silver | 10 |
| 2005 | Artie Schiller | Leroidesanimaux | Gorella | 12 |
| 2004 | Singletary | Antonius Pius | Six Perfections | 14 |
| 2003 | Six Perfections | Touch of the Blues | Century City | 13 |
| 2002 | Domedriver | Rock of Gibraltar | Good Journey | 14 |
| 2001 | Val Royal | Forbidden Apple | Bach | 12 |
| 2000 | War Chant | North East Bound | Dansili | 14 |
| 1999 | Silic | Tuzla | Docksider | 14 |
| 1998 | Da Hoss | Hawksley Hill | Labeeb | 14 |
| 1997 | Spinning World | Geri | Decorated Hero | 12 |
| 1996 | Da Hoss | Spinning World | Same Old Wish | 14 |
| 1995 | Ridgewood Pearl | Fastness | Sayyedati | 13 |
| 1994 | Barathea | Johann Quatz | Unfinished Symph | 14 |
| 1993 | Lure | Ski Paradise | Fourstars Allstar | 13 |
| 1992 | Lure | Paradise Creek | Brief Truce | 14 |
| 1991 | Opening Verse | Val Des Bois | Star of Cozzene | 14 |
| 1990 | Royal Academy | Itsallgreektome | Priolo | 13 |
| 1989 | Steinlen | Sabona | Most Welcome | 11 |
| 1988 | Miesque | Steinlen | Simply Majestic | 12 |
| 1987 | Miesque | Show Dancer | Sonic Lady | 14 |
| 1986 | Last Tycoon | Palace Music | Fred Astaire | 14 |
| 1985 | Cozzene | Al Mamoon | Shadeed | 14 |
| 1984 | Royal Heroine | Star Choice | Cozzene | 10 |
