= 2017 Breeders' Cup Challenge series =

Series of horse races

The 2017 Breeders' Cup Challenge series provided winners of the designated races an automatic "Win and You're In" Berth in the 2017 Breeders' Cup. Races were chosen by the Breeders' Cup organization and included key prep races in the various Breeders' Cup divisions from around the world.

== Summary ==
On April 12, 2017, the Breeders Cup organization announced that the 2017 Breeders' Cup Challenge would consist of 81 races from 13 countries. Compared to the 2016 Challenge Series, three races were added: the Belmont Sprint Championship Stakes, the Highlander Stakes and the First Lady Stakes. The Gold Cup at Santa Anita, Belmont Oaks and Canadian Stakes were discontinued from the series.

Fifty pre-entrants in the 2017 Breeders' Cup qualified via the Challenge series, which was particularly important as seven of the Breeders' Cup races were oversubscribed. A maximum of 14 horses (12 in the Turf Sprint) are allowed to start in each race. Winners of the Challenge races are given automatic entries, while other pre-entries are ranked by a points system and the judgement of a panel of experts.

A few challenge series winners could not compete at the 2017 Breeders' Cup due to injury or retirement. Two-time Eclipse Award winner Songbird qualified for the Distaff by winning the Ogden Phipps Stakes but was retired in August due to injury. Bal a Bali, winner of the Shoemaker Mile Stakes, was retired in October because he was not training at a high enough level. Ulysses was a late scratch due to an ankle injury.

Five winners of Challenge series races went on to win their respective division at the Breeders' Cup:

- Gun Runner, who won the Classic, qualified by winning both the Stephen Foster and Whitney Handicap
- Forever Unbridled won the Distaff after automatically qualifying with victories in both the Fleur de Lis and Personal Ensign
- Rushing Fall qualified in the Jessamine Stakes then went on to win the Juvenile Turf
- Roy H won the Santa Anita Sprint Championship and the Sprint
- World Approval won both the Woodbine Mile and Breeders' Cup Mile

== Winners ==
The winners of the 2017 Breeders' Cup Challenge series races are shown below. The last column shows if the winner was subsequently pre-entered in the corresponding Breeders' Cup race and if so, whether they finished in the top three positions.

Month	Race	Track	Location	Division	Winner	BC Status
January	Paddock Stakes	Kenilworth	South Africa	Breeders' Cup Filly & Mare Turf	Bela Bela	not entered
January	Queen's Plate	Kenilworth	South Africa	Breeders' Cup Mile	Legal Eagle	not entered
February	February Stakes	Tokyo	Japan	Breeders' Cup Classic	Gold Dream	not entered
April	Doncaster Mile	Randwick	Australia	Breeders' Cup Mile	It's Somewhat	not entered
April	TJ Smith Stakes	Randwick	Australia	Breeders' Cup Turf Sprint	Chautauqua	not entered
April	Queen of the Turf Stakes	Randwick	Australia	Breeders' Cup Filly & Mare Turf	Foxplay	not entered
May	Gran Premio Criadores	Palermo	Argentina	Breeders' Cup Distaff	Kiriaki	not entered
May	Gran Premio 25 de Mayo	San Isidro	Argentina	Breeders' Cup Turf	Sixties Song	not entered
May	Gran Premio Club Hipico Falabella	Santiago	Chile	Breeders' Cup Mile	Top Casablanca	not entered
June	Shoemaker Mile	Santa Anita	California	Breeders' Cup Mile	Bal a Bali	injured
June	Yasuda Kinen	Tokyo	Japan	Breeders' Cup Mile	Satono Aladdin	not entered
June	Ogden Phipps Stakes	Belmont Park	New York	Breeders' Cup Distaff	Songbird	injured
June	Metropolitan Handicap	Belmont Park	New York	Breeders' Cup Dirt Mile	Mor Spirit	entered
June	Gran Prêmio Brasil	Hipódromo da Gávea	Brazil	Breeders' Cup Turf	Voador Magee	not entered
June	Stephen Foster Handicap	Churchill Downs	Kentucky	Breeders' Cup Classic	Gun Runner	won
June	Fleur de Lis Handicap	Churchill Downs	Kentucky	Breeders' Cup Distaff	Forever Unbridled	won
June	Gran Premio Pamplona	Monterrico	Peru	Breeders' Cup Filly & Mare Turf	Birdie Gold	entered
June	Takarazuka Kinen	Hanshin	Japan	Breeders' Cup Turf	Satono Crown	not entered
July	Princess Rooney Handicap	Gulfstream Park	Florida	Breeders' Cup Filly & Mare Sprint	Curlin's Approval	entered
July	Smile Sprint Handicap	Gulfstream Park	Florida	Breeders' Cup Sprint	Imperial Hint	second
July	Highlander Stakes	Woodbine	Canada	Breeders' Cup Turf Sprint	Green Mask	not entered
July	Belmont Sprint Championship Stakes	Belmont Park	New York	Breeders' Cup Sprint	Mind Your Biscuits	third
July	Bing Crosby Handicap	Del Mar	California	Breeders' Cup Sprint	Ransom the Moon	entered
July	King George VI and Queen Elizabeth Stakes	Ascot	England	Breeders' Cup Turf	Enable	not entered
July	Haskell Invitational	Monmouth	New Jersey	Breeders' Cup Classic	Girvin	not entered
July	Clement L. Hirsch Stakes	Del Mar	California	Breeders' Cup Distaff	Stellar Wind	entered
August	Sussex Stakes	Goodwood	England	Breeders' Cup Mile	Here Comes When	not entered
August	Whitney Handicap	Saratoga	New York	Breeders' Cup Classic	Gun Runner	won
August	Beverly D. Stakes	Arlington	Illinois	Breeders' Cup Filly & Mare Turf	Dacita	entered
August	Arlington Million	Arlington	Illinois	Breeders' Cup Turf	Beach Patrol	second
August	Pacific Classic	Del Mar	California	Breeders' Cup Classic	Collected	second
August	Del Mar Handicap	Del Mar	California	Breeders' Cup Turf	Hunt	entered
August	Prix Jacques Le Marois	Deauville	France	Breeders' Cup Mile	Al Wukair	not entered
August	Juddmonte International	York	England	Breeders' Cup Turf	Ulysses	scratched
August	Yorkshire Oaks	York	England	Breeders' Cup Filly & Mare Turf	Enable	not entered
August	Nunthorpe Stakes	York	England	Breeders' Cup Turf Sprint	Marsha	entered
August	Personal Ensign Stakes	Saratoga	New York	Breeders' Cup Distaff	Forever Unbridled	won
August	Ballerina Stakes	Saratoga	New York	Breeders' Cup Filly & Mare Sprint	By the Moon	entered
August	Sword Dancer Invitational	Saratoga	New York	Breeders' Cup Turf	Sadler's Joy	entered
August	Forego Stakes	Saratoga	New York	Breeders' Cup Sprint	Drefong	entered
August	Pat O'Brien Handicap	Del Mar	California	Breeders' Cup Dirt Mile	Giant Expectations	entered
September	T. Von Zastrow Stutenpreis	Baden-Baden	Germany	Breeders' Cup Filly & Mare Turf	Ashiana	not entered
September	Spinaway Stakes	Saratoga	New York	Breeders' Cup Juvenile Fillies	Lady Ivanka	scratched
September	Grosser Preis von Baden	Baden-Baden	Germany	Breeders' Cup Turf	Guignol	not entered
September	Juvenile Stakes	Leopardstown	Ireland	Breeders' Cup Juvenile Turf	Nelson	withdrawn
September	Matron Stakes	Leopardstown	Ireland	Breeders' Cup Filly & Mare Turf	Hydrangea	not entered
September	Irish Champion Stakes	Leopardstown	Ireland	Breeders' Cup Turf	Decorated Knight	entered
September	Moyglare Stud Stakes	Curragh	Ireland	Breeders' Cup Juvenile Fillies Turf	Happily	entered
September	Flying Five Stakes	Curragh	Ireland	Breeders' Cup Turf Sprint	Caravaggio	not entered
September	Pocahontas Stakes	Churchill Downs	Kentucky	Breeders' Cup Juvenile Fillies	Patrona Margarita	not entered
September	Iroquois Stakes	Churchill Downs	Kentucky	Breeders' Cup Juvenile	The Tabulator	entered
September	Woodbine Mile	Woodbine	Canada	Breeders' Cup Mile	World Approval	won
September	Natalma Stakes	Woodbine	Canada	Breeders' Cup Juvenile Fillies Turf	Capla Temptress	entered
September	Summer Stakes	Woodbine	Canada	Breeders' Cup Juvenile Turf	Untamed Domain	second
September	Rockfel Stakes	Newmarket	England	Breeders' Cup Juvenile Fillies Turf	Juliet Capulet	entered
September	Royal Lodge Stakes	Newmarket	England	Breeders' Cup Juvenile Turf	Roaring Lion	not entered
September	Vosburgh Stakes	Belmont Park	New York	Breeders' Cup Sprint	Takaful	entered
September	Joe Hirsch Turf Classic Invitational Stakes	Belmont Park	New York	Breeders' Cup Turf	Beach Patrol	second
September	FrontRunner Stakes	Santa Anita	California	Breeders' Cup Juvenile	Bolt d'Oro	third
September	Zenyatta Stakes	Santa Anita	California	Breeders' Cup Distaff	Paradise Woods	third
September	Chandelier Stakes	Santa Anita	California	Breeders' Cup Juvenile Fillies	Moonshine Memories	entered
September	Rodeo Drive Stakes	Santa Anita	California	Breeders' Cup Filly & Mare Turf	Avenge	entered
September	Awesome Again Stakes	Santa Anita	California	Breeders' Cup Classic	Mubtaahij	entered
September	Sprinters Stakes	Nakayama	Japan	Breeders' Cup Turf Sprint	Red Falx	not entered
October	Prix de l'Opéra	Chantilly	France	Breeders' Cup Filly & Mare Turf	Rhododendron	second
October	Prix Jean-Luc Lagardère	Chantilly	France	Breeders' Cup Juvenile Turf	Happily	entered Fillies Turf
October	Prix Marcel Boussac	Chantilly	France	Breeders' Cup Juvenile Fillies Turf	Wild Illusion	not entered
October	Phoenix Stakes	Keeneland	Kentucky	Breeders' Cup Sprint	Whitmore	entered
October	Alcibiades Stakes	Keeneland	Kentucky	Breeders' Cup Juvenile Fillies	Heavenly Love	entered
October	Champagne Stakes	Belmont Park	New York	Breeders' Cup Juvenile	Firenze Fire	entered
October	Jockey Club Gold Cup	Belmont Park	New York	Breeders' Cup Classic	Diversify	withdrawn
October	First Lady Stakes	Keeneland	Kentucky	Breeders' Cup Filly & Mare Turf	Zipessa	entered
October	Thoroughbred Club of America Stakes	Keeneland	Kentucky	Breeders' Cup Filly & Mare Sprint	Finley'sluckycharm	entered
October	Shadwell Turf Mile Stakes	Keeneland	Kentucky	Breeders' Cup Mile	Suedois	entered
October	Breeders' Futurity Stakes	Keeneland	Kentucky	Breeders' Cup Juvenile	Free Drop Billy	entered
October	Santa Anita Sprint Championship	Santa Anita	California	Breeders' Cup Sprint	Roy H	won
October	Flower Bowl Invitational	Belmont Park	New York	Breeders' Cup Filly & Mare Turf	War Flag	entered
October	Frizette Stakes	Belmont Park	New York	Breeders' Cup Juvenile Fillies	Separationofpowers	entered
October	Bourbon Stakes	Keeneland	Kentucky	Breeders' Cup Juvenile Turf	Flameaway	entered
October	Spinster Stakes	Keeneland	Kentucky	Breeders' Cup Distaff	Romantic Vision	entered
October	Jessamine Stakes	Keeneland	Kentucky	Breeders' Cup Juvenile Fillies Turf	Rushing Fall	won
