= Win Approval =

American Thoroughbred racehorse (1992–2021)

- Sire: With Approval
- Grandsire: Caro
- Dam: Negotiator
- Damsire: Hoist the Flag
- Sex: Mare
- Foaled: 29 January 1992
- Country: United States
- Color: Grey
- Breeder: Live Oak Stud
- Owner: Charlotte Weber, Live Oak Plantation
- Trainer: Patrick J. Kelly
- Record: 16: 2-4-1
- Earnings: US$57,210

Awards
- TOBA Broodmare of the Year (2017)

Honours
- Florida Broodmare of the Year (2006, 2016,2017)

Win Approval (29 January 1992 – 19 July 2021) was an American Thoroughbred racehorse and "Blue Hen" broodmare. She was the daughter of With Approval, who was the winner of the Canadian Triple Crown of Thoroughbred Racing and a Champion turf racer. She had an unremarkable racing career, running for her breeder between 1994 and 1996. After her retirement from racing, she became an exceptional broodmare, producing four graded stakes race winners from ten foals. Her progeny earned US$8,936,808. She was named the Thoroughbred Owners and Breeders Association Broodmare of the Year for 2017. She was euthanized at age 29 in 2021.

== Notable progeny ==
Eight of Win Approval's foals would be winners. Her 1998 foal, Stakes winner Revved Up, would retire at 11 with US$1,548,653 in earnings. Her 1999 foal, the multi-millionaire Miesque's Approval won the Breeders' Cup Mile. Her 2008 foal, Za Approval earned US$1,394,666 and was second in the Breeders' Cup Mile to two-time Horse of the Year Wise Dan. Her final foal World Approval, born in 2012, would win both the Breeders' Cup Mile and Woodbine Mile.

== Personality ==
The manager of the Live Oak Stud, Bruce Hill, described her temperament: "She's very independent. She's happier when you give her her feed and keep going, but she's not difficult." He went on to say, "You could probably breed anything to her and she would get you a racehorse. All of her foals are geldings for a reason, they're quite independent like her. They are not necessarily cooperative all of the time, they'll prop and spin and buck. They aren't easy to ride, they're not run offs but the jocks have their hands full that's for sure, and they earn every penny when they get on them." Trainer Mark E. Casse described the half-brothers Za Approval and World Approval more bluntly, "People ask if he's like (his multiple graded stakes-winning half brother) Za Approval and I'm like 'Yeah, they're both mean.'" Both Za Approval and World Approval raced as geldings due to their difficult dispositions.
