= Tampa Bay Stakes =

American Thoroughbred horse race

- Class: Grade III
- Location: Tampa Bay Downs; Oldsmar, Florida
- Inaugurated: 1985
- Race type: Thoroughbred – Flat racing

Race information
- Distance: 1 1/16 miles
- Surface: Turf
- Track: Left-handed
- Qualification: Four-year-olds and older
- Weight: 123 lbs with allowances
- Purse: $175,000 (since 2018)

The Tampa Bay Stakes is a Grade III American Thoroughbred horse race for horses four years old or older, run over a distance of 1 1/16 miles on the turf held annually in early February at Tampa Bay Downs, Oldsmar, Florida. The event currently carries a purse of $175,000.

== History ==
The race was inaugurated in 9 April 1985 and was run on the dirt track over a distance of 6 furlongs. The following year the race was not held.

In 1987 the event received sponsorship from the Breeders' Cup and Budweiser and was renewed at a new distance of 1 1/16 miles on the dirt track. Budweiser terminated its sponsorship in 1996 and this affected the stakes of the event. The Breeders' Cup also removed their sponsorship but much later in 2006.

The first running of the event on the turf was in 1999.

In 2011 the event was upgraded to a Grade III event.

The 2018 winner of the event, US Champion Male Turf Horse World Approval of 2017 resumed after winning the 2017 Breeders' Cup Mile starting as the overwhelming 1/5on favorite.

== Records ==
Speed record:

- 1 1/16 miles – 1:38.83 Running Bee (2025)

Margins:

- 5 3/4 lengths – Delay of Game (2000)

Most wins:

- 2 – Gallant Mel (1989, 1991)
- 2 – Lord John (1992, 1993)
- 2 – Delay of Game (2000, 2001)
- 2 – Burning Roma (2003, 2004)
- 2 – Inspector Lynley (2017, 2019)

Most wins by a jockey:

- 3 – Ricardo D. Lopez (1989, 1990, 1991)
- 3 – William T. Henry (1993, 1995, 1999)

Most wins by a trainer:

- 4 – Claude R. McGaughey III (2016, 2017, 2019, 2024)

Most wins by an owner:

- 2 – D. Edwards & M. W. Mitchell (1989, 1991)
- 2 – John E. Callaway (1992, 1993)
- 2 – John H. Peace (2000, 2001)
- 2 – Harold L. Queen (2003, 2004)
- 2 – Stuart S. Janney III & Phipps Stable (2017, 2019)
- 2 – WinStar Farm (2011, 2023)

== Winners ==
Year	Winner	Age	Jockey	Trainer	Owner	Distance	Time	Purse	Grade	Ref
Tampa Bay Stakes
2026	Quatrocento	5	Julien Leparoux	Fausto Gutierrez	St. George Stables	1 1/16 miles	1:41.51	$150,000	III	
2025	Running Bee	6	Flavien Prat	Chad C. Brown	Calumet Farm	1 1/16 miles	1:38.83	$150,000	III	
2024	Never Explain	6	Vincent Cheminaud	Claude R. McGaughey III	Courtlandt Farms	1 1/16 miles	1:40.03	$150,000	III	
2023	Emmanuel	4	Javier Castellano	Todd A. Pletcher	WinStar Farm	1 1/16 miles	1:39.25	$150,000	III	
2022	Shirl's Speight	5	Emma-Jayne Wilson	Roger L. Attfield	Charles E. Fipke	1 1/16 miles	1:41.20	$150,000	III	
2021	Get Smokin	4	Junior Alvarado	Thomas Bush	Mary Abeel Sullivan Revocable Trust	1 1/16 miles	1:40.75	$150,000	III	
2020	Admiralty Pier	5	Samy Camacho	Barbara J. Minshall	Hoolie Racing Stable & Bruce Lunsford	1 1/16 miles	1:41.96	$150,000	III	
2019	Inspector Lynley	5	José L. Ortiz	Claude R. McGaughey III	Stuart S. Janney III & Phipps Stable	1 1/16 miles	1:40.35	$175,000	III	
2018	World Approval	6	John R. Velazquez	Mark E. Casse	Live Oak Plantation	1 1/16 miles	1:40.66	$175,000	III	
2017	Inspector Lynley	4	John R. Velazquez	Claude R. McGaughey III	Stuart S. Janney III & Phipps Stable	1 1/16 miles	1:40.65	$150,000	III	
2016	Reload	7	Javier Castellano	Claude R. McGaughey III	Phipps Stable	1 1/16 miles	1:40.15	$150,000	III	
2015	Lochte	5	Paco Lopez	Marcus J. Vitali	Crossed Sabres Farm	1 1/16 miles	1:41.63	$150,000	III	
2014	Guys Reward	7	Abdiel Jaen	Dale L. Romans	Michael J. Bruder	1 1/16 miles	1:43.44	$150,000	III	
2013	Swift Warrior	5	Jose L. Espinoza	John P. Terranova II	James Covello and James Dolan	1 1/16 miles	1:43.14	$150,000	III	
2012	Roman Tiger	7	Angel Serpa	Dennis J. Manning	Dennis J. Manning	1 1/16 miles	1:40.42	$150,000	III	
2011	Doubles Partner	4	Julien R. Leparoux	Todd A. Pletcher	WinStar Farm	1 1/16 miles	1:40.67	$125,000	III	
2010	Karelian	8	Rosemary Homeister Jr.	George R. Arnold II	Green Lantern Stables	1 1/16 miles	1:42.61	$146,500	Listed	
2009	Victory Alleged	8	Carlos H. Marquez Jr.	Dennis J. Manning	Mac Fehsenfeld	1 1/16 miles	1:41.10	$142,500	Listed	
2008	Cosmonaut	6	Edgar S. Prado	Philip M. Serpe	Flying Zee Stable	abt. 1 1/16 miles	1:44.14	$146,500	Listed	
2007	Hotstufanthensome	7	Rajiv Maragh	Norman R. Pointer	Runnin Horse Farm	1 1/16 miles	1:41.24	$150,000	Listed	
Tampa Bay Breeders' Cup Stakes
2006	Fort Prado	5	Brice Blanc	Chris M. Block	Team Block	1 1/16 miles	1:40.76	$95,000	Listed	
2005	Wire Bound	4	Eduardo O. Nunez	Manuel Criollo	Silver Diamond Thoroughbreds	1 1/16 miles	1:40.14	$100,000	Listed	
2004	Burning Roma	6	Jesus Lopez Castanon	Heather A. Giglio	Harold L. Queen	1 1/16 miles	1:41.68	$100,000	Listed	
2003	Burning Roma	5	Jesus Lopez Castanon	Heather A. Giglio	Harold L. Queen	1 1/16 miles	1:41.53	$99,000	Listed	
2002	Boastful	4	T. D. Houghton	William I. Mott	Kinsman Stable	1 1/16 miles	1:40.95	$78,000	Listed	
2001	Delay of Game	8	Christopher P. DeCarlo	George R. Arnold II	John H. Peace	1 1/16 miles	1:41.91	$80,450	Listed	
2000	Delay of Game	7	Ramon B. Perez	George R. Arnold II	John H. Peace	1 1/16 miles	1:39.72	$50,000	Listed	
1999	Legs Galore	4	William T. Henry	Reed M. Combest	Ann & Clinton Lagrosa	1 1/16 miles	1:39.65	$49,500		
1998	Ship Liner	4	C. Punchie Goberdhan	Donald M. Pittman	Phillip O. Williams	1 1/16 miles	1:44.20	$34,500		
1997	Request a Star	6	C. Punchie Goberdhan	Jason J. Stodghill	Paul O'Toole	1 1/16 miles	1:45.40	$37,300		
1996	Iron Racketeer	5	Dante Scocca	Michael J. Falzone	Charles G. Fink	1 1/16 miles	1:46.40	$30,425		
1995	Not Surprising	5	William T. Henry	Judson Van Worp	Robert Van Worp	1 1/16 miles	1:44.40	$77,100	Listed	
1994	Pride of Burkaan	4	Eric Valles	Leo Azpurua Jr.	A. Johnson & G. Murchibon	1 1/16 miles	1:45.80	$78,525		
1993	Lord John	5	William T. Henry	John E. Callaway	John E. Callaway	1 1/16 miles	1:45.20	$77,425		
1992	Lord John	4	Willie Martinez	John E. Callaway	John E. Callaway	1 1/16 miles	1:45.80	$67,850		
1991	Gallant Mel	6	Ricardo D. Lopez	Donald Campbell	Edwards & Mitchel	1 1/16 miles	1:45.50	$46,075		
1990	Majesty's Imp	6	Ricardo D. Lopez	Sturges J. Ducoing	Batarasan Stable	1 1/16 miles	1:45.20	$75,375		
1989	Gallant Mel	4	Ricardo D. Lopez	Donald Campbell	Edwards & Mitchell	1 1/16 miles	1:44.40	$45,000		
1988	Homebuilder	4	Larry Saumell	Woody Stephens	Ryehill Farms	1 1/16 miles	1:43.80	$70,650		
1987	My Prince Charming	4	Octavio Aviles	Newcomb Green	Aronow Stable	1 1/16 miles	1:46.60	$65,000		
1986	Race not held									
Tampa Bay Stakes
1985	Never Company	5	Donald Allen	Chester C. Thrasher	Myakka Stable	6 furlongs	1:11.60	$25,000		

Legend:
Dirt Turf

== See also ==
- List of American and Canadian Graded races
