= Wise Dan Stakes =

- Class: Grade II
- Location: Churchill Downs; Louisville, Kentucky, United States
- Inaugurated: 1983 (as Firecracker Handicap)
- Race type: Thoroughbred - Flat racing
- Website: Churchill Downs

Race information
- Distance: 1 1/16 miles
- Surface: Turf
- Track: Left-handed
- Qualification: Four-year-olds and older
- Weight: 123 lbs. with allowances
- Purse: $500,000 (2024)

The Wise Dan Stakes is a Grade II American thoroughbred horse race for horses four-year-old and older run at a distance of one and one sixteenth of a mile on the turf held annually in June at Churchill Downs racetrack in Louisville, Kentucky.

== History ==
The event was inaugurated on 4 July 1983 as the Firecracker Handicap over a distance of 7 furlongs on a sloppy dirt track and was won by Shot n' Missed who defeated the odds on favorite Dave's Friend in a five horse field. In the third running in 1985 the winner Rapid Gray set a new track record for the distance in a time of 1:21 1/5. The event was discontinued for seven years and when it was revived in 1993 it was held on the turf course over a distance of one mile.

The event was classified as Grade III in 1995, and upgraded to Grade II in 2002.

The event attracted several champion turf runners including Kitten's Joy who won the event in 2004 and later that year became U.S. Champion Male Turf Horse and Miesque's Approval who won this event in 2006 and later that year would capture the Breeders' Cup Mile.

The only dual winner was Wise Dan of this event who in 2011 won in his turf debut and 2013. Later in 2013 Wise Dan was crowned American Horse of the Year for the second year running.

The race was renamed as the Wise Dan Stakes in 2016

The distance was increased from 1 mile to 1 1/16 miles also in 2016.

The race was placed on hiatus in June 2022 due to the suspension of turf racing at Churchill Downs.

In 2023 the event was moved to Ellis Park after Churchill Downs closed their spring meeting earlier due to a spate of injuries.

== Records ==
Speed records

- 1 1/16 miles: 1:40.26 – Kasaqui (ARG) (2017)
- 1 mile: 1:33.78 – Jaggery John (1995)
- 7 furlongs: 1:21.20 – Rapid Gray (1985)

Margins

- 3 1/2 lengths – Soviet Line (IRE) (1997)

Most wins

- 2 – Wise Dan (2011, 2013)

Most wins by a jockey

- 2 – Robby Albarado (1999, 2014)
- 2 – Kent J. Desormeaux (2008, 2009)
- 2 – Shane Sellers (2000, 2004)
- 2 – Pat Day (1997, 2002)
- 2 – Florent Geroux (2018, 2021)

Most wins by a trainer

- 4 – Dale L. Romans (2003, 2004, 2008, 2014)

Most wins by an owner

- 2 – Mason Rudd (1994, 1996)
- 2 – Gainsborough Farm (1997, 2001)
- 2 – Live Oak Plantation (2006, 2019)

== Winners ==
Year	Winner	Age	Jockey	Trainer	Owner	Distance	Time	Purse	Grade	Ref
At Churchill Downs – Wise Dan Stakes
2026	Lagynos	5	Jose L. Ortiz	Steven M. Asmussen	HRH Prince Sultan Bin Mishal Al Suad	1 1/16 miles	1:41.68	$500,000	II	
2025	Brilliant Berti	4	Brian Hernandez Jr.	Cherie DeVaux	Klein Racing	1 1/16 miles	1:43.41	$499,250	II	
2024	Ottoman Fleet (GB)	5	Flavien Prat	Charlie Appleby	Godolphin Racing	1 1/16 miles	1:41.26	$465,000	II	
At Ellis Park
2023	Stitched	4	Flavien Prat	Gregory Foley	Nathan McCauley, Michael W. Olszewski & William J. Minton	1 1/16 miles	1:40.97	$395,000	II	
At Churchill Downs
2022	Race not held									
2021	Set Piece (GB)	5	Florent Geroux	Brad H. Cox	Juddmonte Farms	1 1/16 miles	1:40.50	$300,000	II	
2020	Factor This	5	Shaun Bridgmohan	Brad H. Cox	Gaining Ground Racing	1 1/16 miles	1:41.15	$200,000	II	
2019	March to the Arch	4	Tyler Gaffalione	Mark E. Casse	Live Oak Plantation	1 1/16 miles	1:40.58	$250,000	II	
2018	Mr. Misunderstood	4	Florent Geroux	Brad H. Cox	Flurry Racing Stables, LLC (Staton Flurry)	1 1/16 miles	1:41.83	$200,000	II	
2017	Kasaqui (ARG)	7	James Graham	Ignacio Correas IV	Wimborne Farm (Diane Perkins)	1 1/16 miles	1:40.26	$200,000	II	
2016	Pleuven (FR)	5	Channing Hill	Philip A. Sims	Nelson McMakin	1 1/16 miles	1:40.96	$200,000	II	
Firecracker Stakes
2015	Departing	5	Miguel Mena	Albert Stall Jr.	Claiborne Farm & Adele B. Dilschneider	1 mile	1:38.16	$200,000	II	
2014	Silver Max	5	Robby Albarado	Dale L. Romans	Mark Bacon & Dana Wells	1 mile	1:34.21	$224,800	II	
Firecracker Handicap
2013	Wise Dan	6	John R. Velazquez	Charles LoPresti	Morton Fink	1 mile	1:39.82	$168,450	II	
2012	Guys Reward	5	Corey J. Lanerie	Dale L. Romans	Michael J. Bruder	1 mile	1:38.46	$165,900	II	
2011	Wise Dan	4	Jon Court	Charles LoPresti	Morton Fink	1 mile	1:34.59	$203,000	II	
2010	Tizdejavu	5	Jesus Lopez Castanon	Gregory Fox	Michael L Cooper & Pamela C. Ziebart	1 mile	1:35.98	$205,625	II	
2009	Mr. Sidney	5	Kent J. Desormeaux	William I. Mott	Circle E Racing (Lee Einsidler)	1 mile	1:37.28	$167,700	II	
2008	Thorn Song	5	Kent J. Desormeaux	Dale L. Romans	Zayat Stables	1 mile	1:36.89	$213,250	II	
2007	Remarkable News (VEN)	5	Ramon A. Dominguez	Angel A. Penna Jr.	Holly Rincon	1 mile	1:34.74	$232,000	II	
2006	Miesque's Approval	7	Eddie Castro	Martin D. Wolfson	Live Oak Plantation (Charlotte C. Weber)	1 mile	1:34.52	$269,500	II	
2005	Kitten's Joy	4	Edgar S. Prado	Dale L. Romans	Kenneth and Sarah Ramsey	1 mile	1:35.25	$274,000	II	
2004	Quantum Merit	5	Shane Sellers	Del W. Carroll II	Very Un Stable & Joseph Gioia	1 mile	1:34.15	$287,750	II	
2003	Tap the Admiral	5	John McKee	Del W. Carroll II	Stanley Ettinger	1 mile	1:35.48	$288,500	II	
2002	Good Journey	6	Pat Day	Wallace Dollase	Flaxman Holdings, Jarvis Margolis et al.	1 mile	1:34.83	$292,500	II	
2001	Irish Prize	5	Gary L. Stevens	Neil D. Drysdale	Gainsborough Farm	1 mile	1:34.68	$276,000	II	
2000	Conserve	4	Shane Sellers	Frank L. Brothers	Claiborne Farm	1 mile	1:35.12	$287,000	II	
1999	Joe Who (BRZ)	4	Robby Albarado	Bob Baffert	James E. Helzer	1 mile	1:36.78	$238,750	III	
1998	Claire's Honor	4	Anthony J. D'Amico	Michael A. Tammaro	Mereworth Farm	1 mile	1:35.93	$286,500	III	
1997	Soviet Line (IRE)	7	Pat Day	Kiaran P. McLaughlin	Gainsborough Farm	1 mile	1:37.67	$203,350	III	
1996	Rare Reason	5	Patrick A. Johnson	Walter M. Bindner Jr.	Mason C. Rudd	1 mile	1:33.81	$203,000	III	
1995	Jaggery John	4	Dean Kutz	Peter M. Vestal	Tom M. Carey	1 mile	1:33.78	$114,400	III	
1994	First and Only	7	Tracy J. Hebert	Walter M. Bindner Jr.	Mason C. Rudd	1 mile	1:35.33	$113,200	Listed	
1993	Cleone	4	Craig Perret	William I. Mott	Allen E. Paulson	1 mile	1:35.90	$115,100	Listed	
1986–1992		Race not held								
1985	Rapid Gray	4	Larry Melancon	William I. Mott	William F. Lucas	7 furlongs	1:21.20	$54,250		
1984	Turn and Cheer	7	James McKnight	A. J. Foyt III	A. J. Foyt Jr.	7 furlongs	1:25.60	$55,250		
1983	Shot n' Missed	6	Leroy Moyers	Brenda Wilson	William F. Lucas	7 furlongs	1:23.20	$44,800		

Legend:
Turf Dirt

== See also ==
List of American and Canadian Graded races
