= 2016 Breeders' Cup Challenge series =

Series of horse races

The 2016 Breeders' Cup Challenge series provided winners of the designated races an automatic "Win and You're In" Berth in the 2016 Breeders' Cup. Races were chosen by the Breeders' Cup organization and included key prep races in the various Breeders' Cup divisions from around the world.

== Summary ==
A total of seven races were added to the Challenge series in 2016. Four were added in April when the initial announcement was made: the Queen of the Turf (which replaced the Queen Elizabeth Stakes), the Gran Premio Club Hipico Falabella, the Gran Premio Pamplona and the Flying Five Stakes. Three more races from Japan were added in June: the February Stakes, the Yasuda Kinen and the Sprinter Stakes.

Forty-five entrants in the 2016 Breeders' Cup qualified via the Challenge series, which was particularly important in 2016 as seven of the Breeders' Cup races were oversubscribed. A maximum of 14 horses (12 in the Dirt Mile) are allowed to start in each race. Winners of the Challenge races were given automatic entries, while other pre-entries were ranked by a points system and the judgement of a panel of experts.

Two Challenge series winners went on to win their respective division at the Breeders' Cup:

- Highland Reel, who qualified for the Turf by winning the King George VI and Queen Elizabeth II stakes
- Classic Empire, who won the Breeders' Futurity Stakes to qualify for the Juvenile

A few Challenge series winners could not compete at the Breeders' Cup due to illness, injury or retirement. Exaggerator, who qualified for the Classic by winning the Haskell, was retired in October. Cavorting, who qualified for two Breeders' Cup races, developed some bone bruising and was also retired in October. The Gurkha, who qualified for the Mile by winning the Sussex Stakes, suffered a ruptured colon and was retired. In the Sprint, both Joking and Lord Nelson were scratched due to late injuries.

== Winners ==
The winners of the 2016 Breeders' Cup Challenge series races are shown below. The last column shows if the winner was subsequently entered in the corresponding Breeders' Cup race, and if so, whether they achieved a top three placing.

Month	Race	Track	Location	Division	Winner	BC Status
January	Paddock Stakes	Kenilworth	South Africa	Breeders' Cup Filly & Mare Turf	Smart Call	not entered
January	Queen's Plate	Kenilworth	South Africa	Breeders' Cup Mile	Legal Eagle	not entered
February	February Stakes	Tokyo	Japan	Breeders' Cup Classic	Moanin	not entered
April	Doncaster Mile	Randwick	Australia	Breeders' Cup Mile	Winx	not entered
April	TJ Smith Stakes	Randwick	Australia	Breeders' Cup Turf Sprint	Chautauqua	not entered
April	Queen of the Turf Stakes	Randwick	Australia	Breeders' Cup Filly & Mare Turf	Azkadelia	not entered
May	Gran Premio Criadores	Palermo	Argentina	Breeders' Cup Distaff	Corona Del Inca	entered
May	Gran Premio Club Hipico Falabella	Santiago	Chile	Breeders' Cup Mile	Kitcat	entered Filly & Mare Turf
May	Gran Premio 25 de Mayo	San Isidro	Argentina	Breeders' Cup Turf	Don Inc	not entered
June	Shoemaker Mile	Santa Anita	California	Breeders' Cup Mile	Midnight Storm	3rd
June	Yasuda Kinen	Tokyo	Japan	Breeders' Cup Mile	Logotype	not entered
June	Ogden Phipps Stakes	Belmont Park	New York	Breeders' Cup Distaff	Cavorting	retired
June	Metropolitan Handicap	Belmont Park	New York	Breeders' Cup Dirt Mile	Frosted	entered Classic
June	Grande Prêmio Brasil	Hipódromo da Gávea	Brazil	Breeders' Cup Turf	My Cherie Amour	not entered
June	Stephen Foster Handicap	Churchill Downs	Kentucky	Breeders' Cup Classic	Bradester	not entered
June	Fleur de Lis Handicap	Churchill Downs	Kentucky	Breeders' Cup Distaff	Paid Up Subscriber	not entered
June	The Gold Cup at Santa Anita	Santa Anita	California	Breeders' Cup Classic	Melatonin	entered
June	Takarazuka Kinen	Hanshin	Japan	Breeders' Cup Turf	Marialite	not entered
June	Gran Premio Pamplona	Monterrico	Peru	Breeders' Cup Filly & Mare Turf	Ryans Charm	entered
July	Princess Rooney Handicap	Gulfstream Park	Florida	Breeders' Cup Filly & Mare Sprint	Spelling Again	entered
July	Smile Sprint Handicap	Gulfstream Park	Florida	Breeders' Cup Sprint	Delta Bluesman	entered
July	Belmont Oaks Invitational Stakes	Belmont Park	New York	Breeders' Cup Filly & Mare Turf	Catch A Glimpse	entered
July	King George VI and Queen Elizabeth Stakes	Ascot	England	Breeders' Cup Turf	Highland Reel	1st
July	Sussex Stakes	Goodwood	England	Breeders' Cup Mile	The Gurkha	retired
July	Clement L. Hirsch Stakes	Del Mar	California	Breeders' Cup Distaff	Stellar Wind	entered
July	Bing Crosby Handicap	Del Mar	California	Breeders' Cup Sprint	Lord Nelson	scratched
July	Haskell Invitational	Monmouth	New Jersey	Breeders' Cup Classic	Exaggerator	retired
August	Whitney Handicap	Saratoga	New York	Breeders' Cup Classic	Frosted	entered
August	Beverly D. Stakes	Arlington	Illinois	Breeders' Cup Filly & Mare Turf	Sea Calisi	entered
August	Arlington Million	Arlington	Illinois	Breeders' Cup Turf	Mondialiste	entered
August	Prix Jacques Le Marois	Deauville	France	Breeders' Cup Mile	Ribchester	not entered
August	Juddmonte International	York	England	Breeders' Cup Turf	Postponed	not entered
August	Yorkshire Oaks	York	England	Breeders' Cup Filly & Mare Turf	Seventh Heaven	entered
August	Nunthorpe Stakes	York	England	Breeders' Cup Turf Sprint	Mecca's Angel	not entered
August	Pacific Classic	Del Mar	California	Breeders' Cup Classic	California Chrome	2nd
August	Del Mar Handicap	Del Mar	California	Breeders' Cup Turf	Ashleyluvssugar	entered
August	Pat O'Brien Handicap	Del Mar	California	Breeders' Cup Dirt Mile	Masochistic	not entered
August	Personal Ensign Stakes	Saratoga	New York	Breeders' Cup Distaff	Haveyougoneaway	not entered
August	Ballerina Stakes	Saratoga	New York	Breeders' Cup Filly & Mare Sprint	Cavorting	retired
August	Sword Dancer Invitational	Saratoga	New York	Breeders' Cup Turf	Flintshire	2nd
August	Forego Stakes	Saratoga	New York	Breeders' Cup Sprint	A.P. Indian	entered
September	T. Von Zastrow Stutenpreis	Baden-Baden	Germany	Breeders' Cup Filly & Mare Turf	Parvaneh	not entered
September	Spinaway Stakes	Saratoga	New York	Breeders' Cup Juvenile Fillies	Pretty City Dancer and Sweet Loretta (dead heat)	not entered entered
September	Grosser Preis von Baden	Baden-Baden	Germany	Breeders' Cup Turf	Iquitos	not entered
September	Matron Stakes	Leopardstown	Ireland	Breeders' Cup Filly & Mare Turf	Alice Springs	entered Mile
September	Irish Champion Stakes	Leopardstown	Ireland	Breeders' Cup Turf	Almanzor	not entered
September	Juvenile Turf Stakes	Leopardstown	Ireland	Breeders' Cup Juvenile Turf	Landfall	not entered
September	Moyglare Stud Stakes	Curragh	Ireland	Breeders' Cup Juvenile Fillies Turf	Intricately	entered
September	Flying Five Stakes	Curragh	Ireland	Breeders' Cup Turf Sprint	Ardhoomey	not entered
September	Pocahontas Stakes	Churchill Downs	Kentucky	Breeders' Cup Juvenile Fillies	Daddy's Lil Darling	entered
September	Iroquois Stakes	Churchill Downs	Kentucky	Breeders' Cup Juvenile	Not This Time	2nd
September	Canadian Stakes	Woodbine	Canada	Breeders' Cup Filly & Mare Turf	Rainha Da Bateria	not entered
September	Woodbine Mile	Woodbine	Canada	Breeders' Cup Mile	Tepin	2nd
September	Natalma Stakes	Woodbine	Canada	Breeders' Cup Juvenile Fillies Turf	Victory to Victory	scratched
September	Summer Stakes	Woodbine	Canada	Breeders' Cup Juvenile Turf	Good Samaritan	3rd
September	Rockfel Stakes	Newmarket	England	Breeders' Cup Juvenile Fillies Turf	Spain Burg	entered
September	Royal Lodge Stakes	Newmarket	England	Breeders' Cup Juvenile Turf	Best of Days	not entered
October	Joe Hirsch Turf Classic Invitational Stakes	Belmont Park	New York	Breeders' Cup Turf	Ectot	entered
October	Vosburgh Stakes	Belmont Park	New York	Breeders' Cup Sprint	Joking	scratched
October	Awesome Again Stakes	Santa Anita	California	Breeders' Cup Classic	California Chrome	2nd
October	FrontRunner Stakes	Santa Anita	California	Breeders' Cup Juvenile	Gormley	entered
October	Chandelier Stakes	Santa Anita	California	Breeders' Cup Juvenile Fillies	Noted and Quoted	entered
October	Rodeo Drive Stakes	Santa Anita	California	Breeders' Cup Filly & Mare Turf	Avenge	3rd
October	Zenyatta Stakes	Santa Anita	California	Breeders' Cup Distaff	Stellar Wind	entered
October	Sprinters Stakes	Nakayama	Japan	Breeders' Cup Turf Sprint	Red Falx	not entered
October	Prix de l'Opéra	Chantilly	France	Breeders' Cup Filly & Mare Turf	Speedy Boarding	not entered
October	Prix Jean-Luc Lagardère	Chantilly	France	Breeders' Cup Juvenile Turf	National Defense	not entered
October	Prix Marcel Boussac	Chantilly	France	Breeders' Cup Juvenile Fillies Turf	Wuheida	not entered
October	Alcibiades Stakes	Keeneland	Kentucky	Breeders' Cup Juvenile Fillies	Dancing Rags	entered
October	Phoenix Stakes	Keeneland	Kentucky	Breeders' Cup Sprint	A. P. Indian	entered
October	Flower Bowl Invitational	Belmont Park	New York	Breeders' Cup Filly & Mare Turf	Lady Eli	2nd
October	Champagne Stakes	Belmont Park	New York	Breeders' Cup Juvenile	Practical Joke	3rd
October	Frizette Stakes	Belmont Park	New York	Breeders' Cup Juvenile Fillies	Yellow Agate	entered
October	Jockey Club Gold Cup	Belmont Park	New York	Breeders' Cup Classic	Hoppertunity	entered
October	Shadwell Turf Mile Stakes	Keeneland	Kentucky	Breeders' Cup Mile	Miss Temple City	entered
October	Breeders' Futurity Stakes	Keeneland	Kentucky	Breeders' Cup Juvenile	Classic Empire	1st
October	Thoroughbred Club of America Stakes	Keeneland	Kentucky	Breeders' Cup Filly & Mare Sprint	Irish Jasper	entered
October	Santa Anita Sprint Championship	Santa Anita	California	Breeders' Cup Sprint	Lord Nelson	scratched
October	Bourbon Stakes	Keeneland	Kentucky	Breeders' Cup Juvenile Turf	Keep Quiet	entered
October	Spinster Stakes	Keeneland	Kentucky	Breeders' Cup Distaff	I'm a Chatterbox	entered
October	Jessamine Stakes	Keeneland	Kentucky	Breeders' Cup Juvenile Fillies Turf	La Coronel	entered
