= Charles LoPresti =

American race horse trainer (born 1957)

Personal information
- Born: September 21, 1957 (age 68)
- Occupation: Horse trainer

Horse racing career
- Sport: Horse racing
- Career wins: 217+ (ongoing) as of April 1, 2014

Major racing wins
- American Classics / Breeders' Cup wins: Breeders' Cup Mile (2012, 2013); Graded Stakes Wins: Northern Dancer Stakes (2009); Forego Stakes (2010); Phoenix Stakes (2010); Firecracker Handicap (2011, 2013); Fayette Stakes (2010, 2011); Clark Handicap (2011); Ben Ali Stakes (2012, 2013); Fourstardave Handicap (2012, 2013); Woodbine Mile (2011, 2012, 2013); Shadwell Turf Mile Stakes (2012); Maker's Mark Mile Stakes (2013, 2014); Woodford Reserve Turf Classic (2013); Alysheba Stakes (2012); Bernard Baruch Handicap (2011)

Significant horses
- Wise Dan, Successful Dan, Here Comes Ben, Turallure
- Updated on 2014-04-05

Charles LoPresti (born September 21, 1957) is an American race horse trainer best known as trainer of two-time Breeders' Cup Mile winner and Eclipse Award for Horse of the Year champion Wise Dan, who was also American Champion Older Male Horse and American Champion Male Turf Horse. Unusual for modern American horse trainers, he is based year-round at Keeneland Race Course and does not move his training stable from track to track throughout the year. He chooses to give his horses time off in the winter and does not race-year-round.

== Background ==
Lopresti was born in Brooklyn, New York, and grew up in Smithtown, a suburb of New York located on Long Island. His first exposure to horses were the pleasure horses of his uncle. LoPresti then spent time around hunters, jumpers, and driving horses, only becoming interested in Thoroughbred racing as a young adult. At the age of 19, he attempted to find work on a Thoroughbred farm in Virginia, but the job was taken already. However, the employer there recommended him for a job with trainer Joe Cantey, who was at Belmont Park back in New York. Cantey was also the first husband of horse racing sports analyst Charlsie Cantey. LoPresti stayed there for two years, and in 1978 moved to Lexington, Kentucky, where he worked for Ted Carr at the Domino Stud and learned about the Thoroughbred industry from the ground up. He also worked for Carr for about six years as an assistant manager at Brookside Farm, then owned by Allen Paulson While working at Domino Stud, he met his wife, then named Amy Featherston.

LoPresti next worked as a trainer at Calumet Farm, starting their young horses. He then sent the young horses on to the track where they were further developed by people such as Bill Mott and Frank L. Brothers. During his six-year tenure at Calumet, he met race horse owner Bob Lewis, who asked him to help rehabilitate a horse named Competitive Edge who had undergone surgery in 1992. When that horse returned to the track a winner, the owner of Calumet, Henryk de Kwiatkowski, suggested that LoPresti begin to train some of Calumet's racing stock directly for the track. As a result, LoPresti became a licensed trainer in 1993. When the management of Calumet changed, the husband and wife team of Charles and Amy LoPresti went out on their own. They originally established themselves with a very good reputation for starting yearlings as race horses. Among the young horses they started in training was Lewis' horse Charismatic, winner of the 1999 Kentucky Derby.

Today, the LoPrestis run a 200-acre horse facility in Lexington called Forest Lane Farm. They start about 25 to 30 yearlings each year and house their race string there in the off-season. Amy LoPresti continues to manage Forest Lane while Charles LoPresti handles their race horse training at Keeneland, which is about 15 miles from their farm. In his spare time, LoPresti enjoys the western riding sport of team roping and working cattle with horses.

== Major horses ==
After years of modest success on the track, LoPresti won his first graded stakes race in 2009 with Successful Dan, a half-brother to Wise Dan. Successful Dan earned nearly $1 million, and his wins included four graded stakes races. LoPresti's first Grade I stakes win, however, occurred in 2010 with Here Comes Ben. His next successful horse was Turallure, who earned over $1 million, winning the Woodbine Mile in 2011 and finishing second in the 2011 Breeders' Cup Mile. LoPresti followed up Turallure's success by winning both races in 2012 and again in 2013 with Wise Dan.

Wise Dan is the most successful race horse LoPresti has trained and raced. He started the colt in 2010 as a three-year-old and accumulated a record of 23 wins and earnings of over $7.5 million by the end of Wise Dan's career.

In the 2012 World Thoroughbred Rankings, Wise Dan was assigned a rating of 129, making him the best horse trained in the United States and the fifth-best racehorse in the world. At the Eclipse Awards for the 2012 season, he was voted Champion Male Turf Horse, Champion Older Male Horse, and American Horse of the Year. He was the first horse to win all three awards since John Henry in 1981. In the 2013 rankings, Wise Dan was given a rating of 129, making him the third-best racehorse in the world, the best miler, and the best racehorse in North America. He repeated his successes of the previous year in the Eclipse Awards for 2013, being voted Champion Male Turf Horse, Champion Older Male, and Horse of the Year.
