= 2012 World Thoroughbred Rankings =

Horse race edition

The 2012 World Thoroughbred Rankings was the 2012 edition of the World Thoroughbred Rankings. It was an assessment of Thoroughbred racehorses issued by the International Federation of Horseracing Authorities (IFHA) in January 2012. It included horses aged three or older which competed in flat races during 2011. It was open to all horses irrespective of where they raced or were trained.

== Rankings for 2012 ==
- For a detailed guide to this table, see below.

Rank	Rating	Horse	Age	Sex	Trained	Pos.	Race	Surface	Dist.	Cat.
1	140	Frankel (GB)	4	C	GB	1st	Queen Anne Stakes; Juddmonte International	Turf	1,600; 2,080	M I
2	131	Cirrus des Aigles (FRA)	6	G	FR	1st	Prix Ganay	Turf	2,000	I
3	130	Black Caviar (AUS)	6	M	AUS	1st	Lightning Stakes	Turf	1,000	S
3	130	Excelebration (IRE)	4	C	IRE	1st	Queen Elizabeth II Stakes	Turf	1,600	M
5	129	Wise Dan (USA)	5	G	USA	1st	Breeders' Cup Mile	Turf	1,600	M
6	127	Orfevre (JPN)	4	C	JPN	1st	Takarazuka Kinen	Turf	2,200	L
7	126	Monterosso (GB)	5	H	UAE	1st	Dubai World Cup	Artificial	2,000	I
7	126	Nathaniel (IRE)	4	C	GB	1st 2nd	Eclipse Stakes; King George VI & Queen Elizabeth Stakes	Turf	2,006; 2,400	I L
7	126	So You Think (NZ)	6	H	IRE	1st	Tattersalls Gold Cup	Turf	2,100	I
10	125	Fort Larned (USA)	4	C	USA	1st	Breeders' Cup Classic	Dirt	2,000	I
10	125	Hay List (AUS)	7	G	AUS	1st	Newmarket Handicap	Turf	1,200	S
10	125	I'll Have Another (USA)	3	C	USA	1st	Preakness Stakes	Dirt	1,900	I
13	124	Ambitious Dragon (NZ)	6	G	HK	1st	Sha Tin Trophy	Turf	1,600	M
13	124	Animal Kingdom (USA)	4	C	USA	2nd	Breeders' Cup Mile	Turf	1,600	M
13	124	Bodemeister (USA)	3	C	USA	2nd	Preakness Stakes	Dirt	1,900	I
13	124	Camelot (GB)	3	C	IRE	1st	Epsom Derby	Turf	2,409	L
13	124	Cityscape (GB)	6	H	GB	1st	Dubai Duty Free	Turf	1,800	M
13	124	Danedream (GER)	4	F	GER	1st	King George VI & Queen Elizabeth Stakes	Turf	2,400	L
13	124	Farhh (GB)	4	C	GB	2nd	Eclipse Stakes	Turf	2,006	I
13	124	Gold Ship (JPN)	3	C	JPN	1st	Arima Kinen	Turf	2,500	L
13	124	Krypton Factor (GB)	4	G	UAE	1st	Dubai Golden Shaheen	Artificial	1,200	S
13	124	Mucho Macho Man (USA)	4	C	USA	2nd	Breeders' Cup Classic	Dirt	2,000	I
13	124	Snow Fairy (IRE)	5	M	GB	1st	Irish Champion Stakes	Turf	2,000	I
13	124	St Nicholas Abbey (IRE)	5	H	IRE	1st 3rd	Coronation Cup; Juddmonte International	Turf	2,400; 2,080	L I
25	123	Dullahan (USA)	3	C	USA	1st	Pacific Classic Stakes	Turf	2,000	I
25	123	Game On Dude (USA)	5	G	USA	1st	Californian Stakes; Hollywood Gold Cup; Awesome Again Stakes	Artificial; Artificial; Dirt	1,800; 2,000; 1,800	M I M
25	123	Little Mike (USA)	5	G	USA	1st	Breeders' Cup Turf	Turf	2,400	L
25	123	Point of Entry (USA)	4	C	USA	1st	Sword Dancer Invitational Handicap	Turf	2,400	L
25	123	Rulership (JPN)	5	H	JPN	1st	Queen Elizabeth II Cup	Turf	2,000	I
25	123	Sea Moon (GB)	4	C	GB	1st	Hardwicke Stakes	Turf	2,400	L
31	122	Acclamation (USA)	6	H	USA	1st	Charles Whittingham Memorial Handicap; Eddie Read Handicap	Turf	2,000; 1,800	I M
31	122	Atlantic Jewel (AUS)	4	F	AUS	1st	Sapphire Stakes	Turf	1,200	S
31	122	Caleb's Posse (USA)	4	C	USA	2nd	Metropolitan Handicap	Dirt	1,600	M
31	122	California Memory (USA)	6	G	HK	1st	Hong Kong Cup	Turf	2,000	I
31	122	Dunaden (FR)	6	H	FR	1st	Caulfield Cup	Turf	2,400	L
31	122	Gentildonna (JPN)	3	F	JPN	1st	Japan Cup	Turf	2,400	L
31	122	Meandre (FR)	4	C	FR	1st	Grand Prix de Saint-Cloud	Turf	2,400	L
31	122	More Joyous (NZ)	6	M	AUS	1st	Doncaster Handicap	Turf	1,600	M
31	122	Obviously (IRE)	4	G	USA	3rd	Breeders' Cup Mile	Turf	1,600	M
31	122	Ocean Park (NZ)	4	C	NZ	1st	Cox Plate	Turf	2,040	I
31	122	Pastorius (GER)	3	C	GER	1st	Bayerisches Zuchtrennen	Turf	2,000	I
31	122	Reliable Man (GB)	4	C	FR	4th	King George VI & Queen Elizabeth Stakes	Turf	2,400	L
31	122	Rocket Man (AUS)	7	G	SIN	1st	Kranji Stakes; Lion City Cup	Artificial; Turf	1,200	S
31	122	Sepoy (AUS)	4	C	AUS	1st	Oakleigh Plate	Turf	1,100	S
31	122	Solemia (IRE)	4	F	FR	1st	Prix de l'Arc de Triomphe	Turf	2,400	L
46	121	All Too Hard (AUS)	3	C	AUS	2nd	Cox Plate	Turf	2,040	I
46	121	Capponi (IRE)	5	H	UAE	2nd	Dubai World Cup	Artificial	2,000	I
46	121	Dark Shadow (JPN)	5	H	JPN	4th	Japan Cup	Turf	2,400	L
46	121	Eishin Flash (JPN)	5	H	JPN	1st	Tenno Sho (Autumn)	Turf	2,000	I
46	121	Foxwedge (AUS)	4	C	AUS	1st	William Reid Stakes	Turf	1,200	S
46	121	Groupie Doll (USA)	4	F	USA	1st	Breeders' Cup Filly & Mare Sprint	Dirt	1,400	S
46	121	Mental (AUS)	4	G	AUS	1st	Patinack Farm Classic	Turf	1,200	S
46	121	Moonlight Cloud (GB)	4	F	FR	1st	Prix Maurice de Gheest; Prix du Moulin	Turf	1,300; 1,600	S M
46	121	Paynter (USA)	3	C	USA	1st	Haskell Invitational	Dirt	1,800	M
46	121	Royal Delta (USA)	4	F	USA	1st	Breeders' Cup Ladies' Classic	Dirt	1,800	M
46	121	Shackleford (USA)	4	C	USA	1st	Metropolitan Handicap	Dirt	1,600	M
57	120	African Story (GB)	5	C	UAE	1st	Godolphin Mile	Artificial	1,600	M
57	120	Amazombie (USA)	6	G	USA	1st	Bing Crosby Stakes	Artificial	1,200	S
57	120	Americain (USA)	7	H	FR	4th	Caulfield Cup	Turf	2,400	L
57	120	Encke (USA)	3	C	GB	1st	St Leger Stakes	Turf	2,920	E
57	120	Fenomeno (JPN)	3	C	JPN	1st	Tenno Sho	Turf	2,000	I
57	120	Glorious Days (AUS)	5	G	HK	1st	Jockey Club Mile	Turf	1,600	M
57	120	Lord Kanaloa (JPN)	4	C	JPN	1st	Hong Kong Sprint	Turf	1,200	S
57	120	Mufhasa (NZ)	8	G	NZ	1st	Cathay Pacific Futurity	Turf	1,400	M
57	120	No Risk At All (FR)	5	H	FR	1st	La Coupe	Turf	2,000	I
57	120	Planteur (IRE)	5	H	GB	3rd	Dubai World Cup	Artificial	2,000	I
57	120	Ridasiyna (FR)	3	F	FR	1st	Prix de l'Opéra	Turf	2,000	I
57	120	Ron the Greek (USA)	5	H	USA	1st	Stephen Foster Handicap	Dirt	1,800	M
57	120	Stay Thirsty (USA)	4	C	USA	1st	Cigar Mile Handicap	Dirt	1,600	M
57	120	To The Glory (JPN)	5	H	JPN	1st	Nikkei Shinshun Hai	Turf	2,400	L
57	120	Valyra (GB)	3	F	FR	1st	Prix de Diane	Turf	2,100	I
57	120	What a Winter (SAF)	5	H	SAF	1st	Mercury Sprint	Turf	1,200	S
57	120	Xtension (IRE)	5	H	HK	1st	Champions Mile	Turf	1,600	M

== Guide ==
A complete guide to the main table above.

Rank
A horse's position in the list, with the most highly rated at number 1. Each horse is ranked once according to its highest rating. Any lesser ratings for the same horse are not ranked.

Rating
A rating represents a weight value in pounds, with higher values given to horses which showed greater ability. It is judged that these weights would equalise the abilities of the horses if carried in a theoretical handicap race. The minimum rating required for inclusion is 115.

Horse
Each horse's name is followed by a suffix (from the IFHA's International Code of Suffixes) which indicates the country foaled.

Age
The age of the horse at the time it achieved its rating. The racing ages of all horses foaled in a particular part of the world increase simultaneously, regardless of the actual date of foaling.
Dates of age increase by location foaled
Northern Hemisphere	1 January
South America	1 July
Australia, New Zealand and South Africa	1 August

Sex
C	Colt	Ungelded male horse up to four-years-old
F	Filly	Female horse up to four-years-old
H	Horse	Ungelded male horse over four-years-old
M	Mare	Female horse over four-years-old
G	Gelding	Gelded male horse of any age

Trained
The country where the horse was trained at the time of the rating, abbreviated using the International Code of Suffixes.

Position
The horse's finishing position in the race shown. The actual finishing order can sometimes be amended following an inquiry or a disqualification.
=	Dead-heat
↑	Promoted from original finishing position
↓	Relegated from original finishing position

Race
The race (or one of the races) for which the horse achieved its rating. A defeated horse can be rated above its higher-placed opponents if it carried more weight.

Surface
The surface of the track on which the race was run, eg. turf or dirt. Synthetic surfaces are described as "artificial".

Distance
The distance of the race in metres. In some countries (eg. Canada, Great Britain, Ireland and the United States), the length of a race is usually expressed in miles and furlongs. These units have been converted to metres to allow for universal comparison.
Common conversions
5 furlongs	= 1,006 m	1 mile and 1½ furlongs	= 1,911 m
6 furlongs	= 1,207 m	1 mile and 2 furlongs	= 2,012 m
6½ furlongs	= 1,308 m	1 mile and 2½ furlongs	= 2,112 m
7 furlongs	= 1,408 m	1 mile and 3 furlongs	= 2,213 m
7½ furlongs	= 1,509 m	1 mile and 4 furlongs	= 2,414 m
1 mile	= 1,609 m	1 mile and 6 furlongs	= 2,816 m
1 mile and ½ furlong	= 1,710 m	2 miles	= 3,219 m
1 mile and 1 furlong	= 1,811 m	2 miles and 4 furlongs	= 4,023 m

Category
		Metres	Furlongs
S	Sprint	1,000–1,300; 1,000–1,599 (CAN / USA)	5–6.5; 5–7.99 (CAN / USA)
M	Mile	1,301–1,899; 1,600–1,899 (CAN / USA)	6.51–9.49; 8–9.49 (CAN / USA)
I	Intermediate	1,900–2,100	9.5–10.5
L	Long	2,101–2,700	10.51–13.5
E	Extended	2,701+	13.51+

International Code of Suffixes
The following countries have been represented in the WTR as foaling or training locations since the first edition in 2004.
ARG	Argentina	ITY	Italy
AUS	Australia	JPN	Japan
BRZ	Brazil	KSA	Saudi Arabia
CAN	Canada	NZ	New Zealand
CHI	Chile	SAF	South Africa
CZE	Czech Republic	SIN	Singapore
FR	France	SPA	Spain
GB	Great Britain	TUR	Turkey
GER	Germany	UAE	United Arab Emirates
HK	Hong Kong	USA	United States
HUN	Hungary	VEN	Venezuela
IRE	Ireland	ZIM	Zimbabwe

Shading
The shaded areas represent lesser ratings recorded by horses which were more highly rated in a different category. The IFHA publishes this information when the lower rating is the overall top performance in a particular category.
