= World Approval =

American Thoroughbred racehorse

- Sire: Northern Afleet
- Grandsire: Afleet
- Dam: Win Approval
- Damsire: With Approval
- Sex: Gelding
- Foaled: February 23, 2012
- Country: United States
- Color: Gray
- Breeder: Live Oak Stud
- Owner: Live Oak Plantation
- Trainer: Christophe Clement (2014); Mark Casse (2015-present)
- Record: 27: 12-2-4
- Earnings: $3,062,363

Major wins
- American Derby (2015); Saranac Stakes (2015); United Nations Stakes(2016); Dixie Handicap (2017); Fourstardave Handicap (2017); Woodbine Mile (2017); Tampa Bay Stakes (2018) Breeders' Cup wins: Breeders' Cup Mile (2017)

Awards
- American Champion Male Turf Horse (2017)
- Last updated on 1 February 2021

World Approval (foaled February 23, 2012) is a retired American Thoroughbred racehorse best known for winning the 2017 Breeders' Cup Mile. A minor stakes winner at age three, he won his first Grade I race at age four in the United Nations Stakes. At age five, he won five of six starts including the Grade I Fourstardave Handicap and Woodbine Mile before his victory at the Breeders' Cup.

== Background ==
World Approval was bred in Florida by Live Oak Stud, which is owned by Charlotte Weber, the granddaughter of Campbell Soup founder John T. Dorrance. World Approval raced as a homebred for Weber's Live Oak Plantation. His sire is Northern Afleet, best known as the sire of dual classic winner Afleet Alex. World Approval's dam is Win Approval, a daughter of Canadian Triple Crown champion With Approval. Win Approval previously produced Breeders' Cup Mile winner Miesque's Approval and multiple stakes winners Za Approval and Revved Up.

World Approval was originally trained by Christophe Clement, but after two unsuccessful starts was transferred to the barn of Mark Casse. Casse has won numerous Sovereign Awards as the outstanding trainer in Canada.

World Approval is an attractive gray gelding, known around the backstretch for his difficult temperament. "He lures you in a little bit with his beauty and then it's like he strikes at any time", said Casse.

== Racing career ==
World Approval made two starts at age two, finishing fourth on October 16, 2014, at Belmont Park and third on November 26 at Aqueduct, both races over the main (dirt) track.

He made his three-year-old debut on the turf March 14, 2015 at Gulfstream Park, winning the race with a late outside run by 1 1/4 lengths. In his stakes debut on April 4, he won the Sophomore Turf Stakes at Tampa Bay Downs. After two losses, he was shipped to Arlington Park where he won his first graded stakes, the American Derby. His next start came at saratoga Race Course in the National Museum of Racing Hall of Fame Stakes where he finished fourth, but then took the Saranac Stakes in his next start, also at Saratoga. He closed his three-year-old season with a fourth-place finish in the Hill Prince Stakes.

=== 2016: four-year-old campaign ===
At age four, World Approval won only twice in eight starts but was consistently in the money in top level stakes company. He started the year on March 5, 2016, in an allowance optional claiming race, where he set the early pace and then drew away in the stretch to win by 2 1/2 lengths. He then finished second in the Muniz Memorial Handicap after racing near the back of the field in the early running and then being floated wide in the final turn. He made his first start in Grade I company in the Turf Classic Stakes on May 7, losing by a neck to Divisidero after a determined closing drive. In the Manhattan Stakes on June 11, he set the early pace but was caught in the stretch by Flintshire and Ironicus to finish third.

On July 3, World Approval was entered in the Grade I United Nations Stakes at Monmouth Park, where he went off as the 2.7-1 second choice behind Man o' War Stakes winner Wake Forest. In his first start at 1 3/8 miles, he received a "perfect trip" while rating behind the early pacesetter Cement Clement, then took command of the race entering the stretch. Despite a late run from Money Multiplier, he held on to win by 1 1/4 lengths. "The only question was whether he could go that far," said jockey Florent Geroux. "But he showed he can do it and he did it well. When I asked him at the quarter pole, he responded nicely."

In the Arlington Million on August 13, World Approval was in contention until late in the race, when he weakened to finish seventh in a blanket finish. He then entered the Northern Dancer Stakes where he set a slow pace and led for much of the race but was outkicked near the finish line to finish third. "It's hard to believe the pace was that slow," Casse said. "They certainly sprinted home. I'm not sure that's exactly how he wants to run but I understand that [jockey Julien Leparoux] had no other choice."

World Approval finished his four-year-old season on October 16 in the Canadian International at a distance of 1 1/2 miles. He led for most of the race but tired in the stretch to finish eighth.

=== 2017: five-year-old campaign ===
World Approval made his five-year-old debut on April 2 in the EG Vodka Turf Classic, a stakes race for Florida-bred horses run at a distance of 1 1/8 miles. After rating behind the early leader Go Around, he pulled away in deep stretch to win by 2 1/4 lengths.

He was scheduled to make his next start in the Turf Classic Stakes at Churchill Downs but was scratched due to soft going. Instead he was entered in the Grade II Dixie Stakes on May 20 at Pimlico Race Course, where he went off as the 5-2 favorite on a turf course rated as good. Benefiting from a perfect trip, he again stalked the early pace before drawing away at the top of the stretch to win by 2 1/4 lengths.

On June 10, World Approval was entered in the Grade I Manhattan Handicap at a distance of 1 1/4 miles over Belmont Park's inner turf course. The race attracted multiple stakes winners from the United States and Europe but was won by long-shot Ascend, who won easily in his graded stakes debut. World Approval finished fifth after being outkicked in a blanket finish for second place. Casse later stated that the race was an eye-opener in that the distance of the race was simply too long for the horse against top quality opposition.

Accordingly, his next start was at a distance of only one mile in the Fourstardave Handicap at Saratoga on August 12. Some late rain softened up the turf course but Casse felt the horse had run so well in the Dixie Stakes that it wouldn't be a problem. Casse told jockey Manny Franco that the horse liked to run at a target, so Franco settled behind the early leaders for the first six furlongs. Turning into the stretch, he swung World Approval four-wide and the horse responded with a convincing 2 1/4 length win. "I just tried to stay out of trouble," said Franco, who earned his first Grade I win at Saratoga. "I sensed the pace was good enough because they were fighting for the lead on the first turn."

World Approval followed up with another Grade I win in the Woodbine Mile on September 16 as the 2-1 favorite. He was ridden for the first time by John Velazquez, who quickly realized that no one was interested in setting a decent pace. Accordingly, he went to the early lead and was soon joined by Dragon Bay. Velazquez gave World Approval his head and the horse relaxed as they raced down the backstretch. When Velazquez finally asked him to run, World Approval responded by running the final quarter mile in 22.74 seconds to win by 2 1/4 lengths. "I wasn't sure how he would quicken with not having the target," said Casse, who had watched the race from Lexington. "But there wasn't a whole lot of speed and Johnny realized that and rode him accordingly."

On November 4, World Approval entered the Breeders' Cup Mile at Del Mar, going off as the slight 5-2 favorite on a day dominated by longshot winners. The field of fourteen also included a strong European contingent featuring Ribchester (Lockinge Stakes, Queen Anne, Prix du Moulin de Longchamp), Roly Poly (Falmouth Stakes, Prix Rothschild, Sun Chariot), Suedois (Shadwell Turf Mile), Lancaster Bomber and Zelzal, plus several American-based stakes winners like Blackjackcat and Midnight Storm. World Approval stalked the early pace set by Midnight Storm and Heart to Heart, then swung wide to get racing room as the field turned into the stretch. He wore down the tiring front runners and drew off to win by 1 1/4 lengths, with Lancaster Bomber prevailing in a blanket finish for second place.

World Approval raced three times in 2018, winning the Grade III Tampa Bay Stakes while unplaced in his other two starts.

== Retirement ==
World Approval was officially retired on February 26, 2019. He will be pastured next to his dam and stakes-winning siblings Za Approval and Revved Up. Charlotte Weber commented on her pride in the achievement of the family. "I am proud and privileged to have experienced this Sport of Kings with such outstanding racehorses," she said, "and shall protect them as we grow older together."

== Honors and assessment ==
World Approval was voted American Champion Male Turf Horse for 2017 and was finalist for Horse of the Year. In the 2017 World's Best Racehorse Rankings, World Approval was rated the twelfth-best horse in the world, and the best turf horse in the United States.

== Pedigree ==
Pedigree of World Approval, gray gelding, February 23, 2012
Sire Northern Afleet bay 1993	Afleet chestnut 1984	Mr. Prospector	Raise a Native
Sire Northern Afleet bay 1993	Afleet chestnut 1984	Mr. Prospector	Gold Digger
Sire Northern Afleet bay 1993	Afleet chestnut 1984	Polite Lady	Venetian Jester
Sire Northern Afleet bay 1993	Afleet chestnut 1984	Polite Lady	Friendly Ways
Sire Northern Afleet bay 1993	Nuryette bay 1986	Nureyev	Northern Dancer
Sire Northern Afleet bay 1993	Nuryette bay 1986	Nureyev	Special
Sire Northern Afleet bay 1993	Nuryette bay 1986	Stellarette	Tentam
Sire Northern Afleet bay 1993	Nuryette bay 1986	Stellarette	Square Angel
Dam Win Approval gray 1992	With Approval gray 1986	Caro (IRE)	Fortino II (FR)
Dam Win Approval gray 1992	With Approval gray 1986	Caro (IRE)	Champord
Dam Win Approval gray 1992	With Approval gray 1986	Passing Mood	Buckpasser
Dam Win Approval gray 1992	With Approval gray 1986	Passing Mood	Cool Mood
Dam Win Approval gray 1992	Negotiator gray 1974	Hoist the Flag	Tom Rolfe
Dam Win Approval gray 1992	Negotiator gray 1974	Hoist the Flag	Wavy Navy
Dam Win Approval gray 1992	Negotiator gray 1974	Geneva II	Gulf-Weed
Dam Win Approval gray 1992	Negotiator gray 1974	Geneva II	Anglioflia (family: 7)
