= Notable Speech =

British Thoroughbred racehorse

- Sire: Dubawi
- Grandsire: Dubai Millennium
- Dam: Swift Rose
- Damsire: Invincible Spirit
- Sex: colt
- Foaled: 10 March 2021 (age 5)
- Country: Great Britain
- Colour: Chestnut
- Breeder: Godolphin
- Owner: Godolphin
- Trainer: Charlie Appleby
- Record: 19: 10–1–1
- Earnings: £3,399,131

Major wins
- 2000 Guineas (2024); Sussex Stakes (2024); Woodbine Mile (2025, 2026); Lockinge Stakes (2026); City of York Stakes (2026); Breeders' Cup wins: Breeders' Cup Mile (2025)

Awards
- American Champion Male Turf Horse (2025); Timeform rating: 126
- Last updated on 12 September 2026

Notable Speech (foaled 10 March 2021) is a Thoroughbred racehorse. He is trained in Great Britain by Charlie Appleby and owned by Godolphin. He gained international success when winning the Breeders' Cup Mile in 2025. Earlier he had achieved his breakthrough victory in the 2000 Guineas Stakes, in April 2024. This was his first race on turf and he was the first horse since 1938 to win the Guineas without running as a two-year-old. He has been ridden by William Buick.

== Background ==
Notable Speech was sired by Dubawi, a champion racehorse and excellent sire. Notable Speech's grandsire, Dubai Millennium, was also a dominant racehorse.

== Statistics ==
Date	Distance	Race	Grade/ Group	Track	Odds	Field	Finish	Winning Time	Winning (Losing) Margin	Winner (2nd Place)	Jockey	Ref
2024 – Three-year-old season												
Jan 17	1 mile	Maiden Race		Kempton Park	5/6on*	7	1st	1:40.31	1 1/4 lengths	(Parkland)	William Buick	
Feb 21	1 mile	Conditions Stakes (Note: full name of the event is European Road to the Kentucky Derby Conditions Stakes and it is included in the qualification process for the Kentucky Derby)		Kempton Park	11/10*	5	1st	1:39.24	1 length	(Cuban Tiger)	William Buick	
Apr 6	1 mile	Condition Stakes		Kempton Park	4/7on*	5	1st	1:40.25	2 lengths	(Valvano)	William Buick	
May 4	1 mile	2000 Guineas	I	Newmarket	16/1	11	1st	1:37.21	1 1/2 lengths	(Rosallion)	William Buick	
Jun 18	7 furlongs 213 yards	St James's Palace Stakes	I	Royal Ascot	6/4*	8	7th	1:38.38	(5 1/2 lengths)	Rosallion	William Buick	
Jul 31	1 mile	Sussex Stakes	I	Goodwood	3/1*	5	1st	1:35.97	1 1/2 lengths	(Maljoom)	William Buick	
Sep 8	1600 m	Prix du Moulin de Longchamp	I	Longchamp	5/2*	7	5th	1:38.75	(6 1/2 lengths)	Tribalist	William Buick	
Nov 2	1 mile	Breeders' Cup Mile	I	Del Mar	2.30*	10	3rd	1:32.65	(3/4 length)	More Than Looks	William Buick	
2025 – Four-year-old season												
May 17	1 mile	Lockinge Stakes	I	Newbury	9/2	8	4th	1:35.06	(2 3/4 lengths)	Lead Artist	William Buick	
Jun 17	1 mile	Queen Anne Stakes	I	Royal Ascot	4/1	7	4th	1:36.13	(2 1/4 lengths)	Docklands	William Buick	
Jul 12	6 furlongs	July Cup	I	Newmarket	85/40	14	5th	1:11.18	(2 1/2 lengths)	No Half Measures	William Buick	
Aug 17	1600 m	Prix Jacques Le Marois	I	Deauville	10/3	10	2nd	1:34.23	(head)	Diego Velaquez	William Buick	
Sep 13	1 mile	Woodbine Mile	I	Woodbine	0.40*	11	1st	1:35.33	2 lengths	(My Boy Prince)	William Buick	
Nov 1	1 mile	Breeders' Cup Mile	I	Del Mar	2.60*	13	1st	1:33.66	1 1/2 lengths	(Formidable Man)	William Buick	
2026 – Five-year-old season
Apr 10	1 mile	Maker's Mark Mile Stakes	I	Keeneland	1.08*	7	4th	1:38.14	(1 3/4 lengths)	Zulu Kingdom (IRE)	William Buick	
May 16	1 mile	Lockinge Stakes	I	Newbury	2/1*	10	1st	1:35.27	2 lengths	(More Thunder)	William Buick	
Jun 16	1 mile	Queen Anne Stakes	I	Royal Ascot	9/4*	9	6th	1:37.53	(4 1/4 lengths)	Ten Bob Tony	William Buick	
Aug 22	7 furlongs	City of York Stakes	I	York	9/4*	14	1st	1:24.91	2 3/4 lengths	(Lake Forest)	William Buick	
Sep 12	1 mile	Woodbine Mile	I	Woodbine	0.40*	6	1st	1:33.86	1 1/4 lengths	(Deterministic)	William Buick	

Legend:
Polytrack Turf

Notes:
An (*) asterisk after the odds means Notable Speech was the post-time favorite.

== Pedigree ==
Pedigree of Notable Speech (GB), chestnut horse, foaled March 10, 2012
Sire Dubawi (IRE)	Dubai Millennium (GB)	Seeking the Gold (USA)	Mr. Prospector (USA)
Sire Dubawi (IRE)	Dubai Millennium (GB)	Seeking the Gold (USA)	Con Game (USA)
Sire Dubawi (IRE)	Dubai Millennium (GB)	Colorado Dancer (IRE)	Shareef Dancer (USA)
Sire Dubawi (IRE)	Dubai Millennium (GB)	Colorado Dancer (IRE)	Fall Aspen (USA)
Sire Dubawi (IRE)	Zomaradah (GB)	Deploy (GB)	Shirley Heights (GB)
Sire Dubawi (IRE)	Zomaradah (GB)	Deploy (GB)	Slightly Dangerous (USA)
Sire Dubawi (IRE)	Zomaradah (GB)	Jawaher (IRE)	Dancing Brave (USA)
Sire Dubawi (IRE)	Zomaradah (GB)	Jawaher (IRE)	High Tern (IRE)
Dam Swift Rose (IRE)	Invincible Spirit (IRE)	Green Desert (USA)	Danzig (USA)
Dam Swift Rose (IRE)	Invincible Spirit (IRE)	Green Desert (USA)	Foreign Courier (USA)
Dam Swift Rose (IRE)	Invincible Spirit (IRE)	Rafha (GB)	Kris (GB)
Dam Swift Rose (IRE)	Invincible Spirit (IRE)	Rafha (GB)	Eljazzi (IRE)
Dam Swift Rose (IRE)	Tulips (IRE)	Pivotal (GB)	Polar Falcon (USA)
Dam Swift Rose (IRE)	Tulips (IRE)	Pivotal (GB)	Fearless Revival (GB)
Dam Swift Rose (IRE)	Tulips (IRE)	Hint of Spring (GB)	Seeking the Gold (USA)
Dam Swift Rose (IRE)	Tulips (IRE)	Hint of Spring (GB)	Cherokee Rose (IRE)

- Notable Speech is inbred 3s x 4d to Seeking the Gold, meaning that the stallion appears in the third generation on the sire side and fourth generation on the dam side in Notable Speech's pedigree.
