= Wise Dan =

American-bred Thoroughbred racehorse

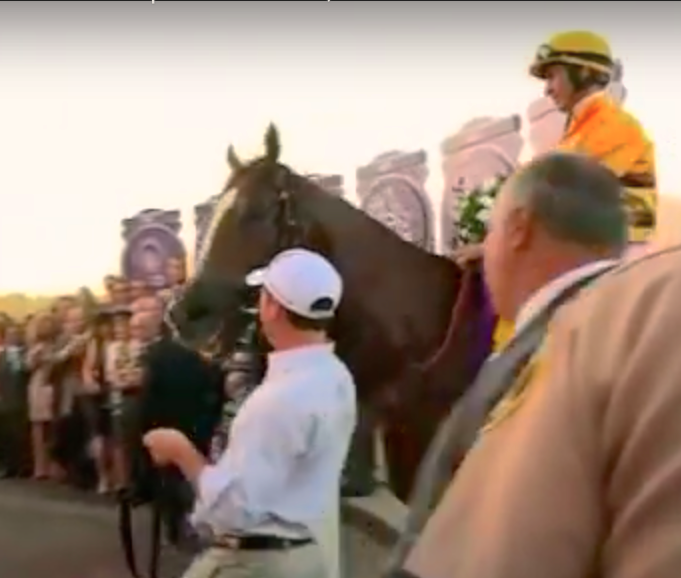
- Wise Dan and John Velazquez (right) in the winners' circle, 2012 Breeders' Cup Mile
- Sire: Wiseman's Ferry
- Grandsire: Hennessy
- Dam: Lisa Danielle
- Damsire: Wolf Power
- Sex: Gelding
- Foaled: February 20, 2007
- Country: United States
- Color: Chestnut
- Breeder: Morton Fink
- Owner: Morton Fink
- Trainer: Charles LoPresti
- Record: 31:23-2-0
- Earnings: $7,552,920

Major wins
- Phoenix Stakes (2010); Firecracker Handicap (2011, 2013); Fayette Stakes (2011); Clark Handicap (2011); Ben Ali Stakes (2012); Fourstardave Handicap (2012, 2013); Woodbine Mile (2012, 2013); Shadwell Turf Mile Stakes (2012, 2014); Breeders' Cup Mile (2012, 2013); Maker's Mark Mile Stakes (2013, 2014); Woodford Reserve Turf Classic (2013, 2014); Bernard Baruch Handicap (2014)

Awards
- American Horse of the Year (2012, 2013); American Champion Older Male Horse (2012, 2013); American Champion Male Turf Horse (2012, 2013)

Honours
- Canadian Horse Racing Hall of Fame (2016); United States Horse Racing Hall of Fame (2020); GII Wise Dan Stakes at Churchill Downs (2016– )
- Last updated on 5 August 2021

Wise Dan (foaled February 20, 2007) is a champion American Hall of Fame and Canadian Hall of Fame Thoroughbred racehorse. He is the first horse to win the same three Eclipse Awards in consecutive years, having been named American Horse of the Year, Champion Older Male and Champion Male Turf Horse in 2012 and 2013.

In a racing career which began in 2010, he has won nineteen Graded stakes races, including victories on turf, dirt, and two types of synthetic surface. Unraced as a two-year-old, Wise Dan won the Phoenix Stakes in 2010 but was well beaten when taking on top-class opposition in the Breeders' Cup Sprint. In the latter half of 2011, he won twice at Grade II level before winning the Grade I Clark Handicap in November. In 2012, Wise Dan won five more races, including Woodbine Mile, Shadwell Turf Mile Stakes, and Breeders' Cup Mile. By autumn, he was the most highly rated active racehorse in North America. In 2013, Wise Dan won six of his seven races, repeating his wins in the Woodbine Mile and the Breeders' Cup Mile as well as taking the Maker's Mark Mile Stakes and the Woodford Reserve Turf Classic. After two wins in early 2014, he underwent surgery for colic in mid-May and was out for over two months for recovery. Returning to racing with a victory in the Grade II Bernard Baruch Handicap, he also won the Shadwell Turf Mile for a second time, after which he developed an ankle injury that sidelined him until the following year. Although he went back into training and was preparing for another run in the 2015 Woodbine Mile, he developed a tendon injury unrelated to the fracture suffered in 2014 and was retired on September 7, 2015.

== Background ==
Wise Dan is a chestnut gelding with a narrow white blaze, bred in Kentucky by his owner Morton Fink, a Chicago-born businessman. He is the most successful racehorse to date sired by Wiseman's Ferry, whose biggest win came in the 2002 West Virginia Derby. Wise Dan's dam, Lisa Danielle, a daughter of the South African champion Wolf Power, was named after Fink's granddaughter. Apart from Wise Dan, she has produced Alysheba Stakes winner Successful Dan. Wise Dan has been trained throughout his racing career by Charles Lopresti.

== Racing career ==
=== 2010: three-year-old season ===
Wise Dan began his racing career on the polytrack surface at Turfway Park in early 2010. After finishing fifth in his debut, he won a six-furlong maiden race by fifteen lengths. In May, he moved to Churchill Downs, where he won an allowance race on the undercard of Super Saver's win in the Kentucky Derby. After a break of five months, Wise Dan returned at Keeneland Race Course in October to win the Grade III Phoenix Stakes, beating the four-year-old Hollywood Hit by half a length. In his final appearance as a three-year-old, he stepped up markedly in class to contest the Breeders' Cup Sprint at Churchill Downs on 6 November. Starting at odds of 8/1, he reached third place in the straight before finishing sixth of the twelve runners behind Big Drama.

=== 2011: four-year-old season ===
Wise Dan's four-year-old campaign began with three losing efforts. He finished fourth when favorite for the Commonwealth Stakes at Keeneland, and when moved up in distance to nine furlongs he finished eighth of the nine runners behind First Dude in the Alysheba Stakes. After Wise Dan's unplaced effort on dirt at Churchill Downs in June, Lopresti tried him on the same venue's turf course. After working well on the surface, Wise Dan was entered in the Grade II Firecracker Handicap over one mile on July 4 and won by two and three quarter lengths.

After a break of two months, he reappeared at Presque Isle Downs in September. Racing on Tapeta Footings, he carried top weight of 124 pounds to victory in the Presque Isle Mile Stakes. In October, Wise Dan returned to Grade I class for the first time since the Breeders' Cup when he ran in the Shadwell Turf Mile Stakes at Keeneland and finished fourth to Gio Ponti. Three weeks later, he captured his third graded stakes race when he won the Fayette Stakes on Keeneland's polytrack, beating Ioya Bigtime by four lengths. In his final start of 2011, he returned to Grade I company for the Clark Handicap at Churchill Downs. Racing over nine furlongs on dirt, he took the lead in the straight and drew away to win by nearly four lengths from a field which included Jockey Club Gold Cup winner Flat Out and Belmont Stakes winner Ruler on Ice. The Clark was the first occasion on which Wise Dan was ridden by John R. Velazquez, who then became the regular rider of the gelding in most races thereafter.

In the 2011 World Thoroughbred Racehorse Rankings, Wise Dan was given a rating of 121, placing him in equal 38th place. Only five horses trained in the United States were rated more highly.

=== 2012: five-year-old season ===
In his first race of 2012, Wise Dan returned to the polytrack at Keeneland for the Grade III Ben Ali Stakes on April 22. Carrying top weight of 123 pounds, he won by ten and a half lengths from Big Blue Kitten in a track record time of 1:46.63. After the race, Velazquez claimed that his only difficulty came when trying to pull up the horse after the finish. In June, Wise Dan started odds-on favorite for the Grade I Stephen Foster Handicap, run over the same course and distance as the Clark. In a rough finish, he overtook leader Nate's Mineshaft in the closing stages but was caught on the post and beaten a head by Ron the Greek. According to Charles Lopresti, Velazquez said he had been focusing his attention on Nate's Mineshaft and "never saw that horse (Ron the Greek) coming". The unplaced horses in the Stephen Foster included Fort Larned, who subsequently won the important Whitney Handicap at Saratoga and the Breeders' Cup Classic at Santa Anita in November.

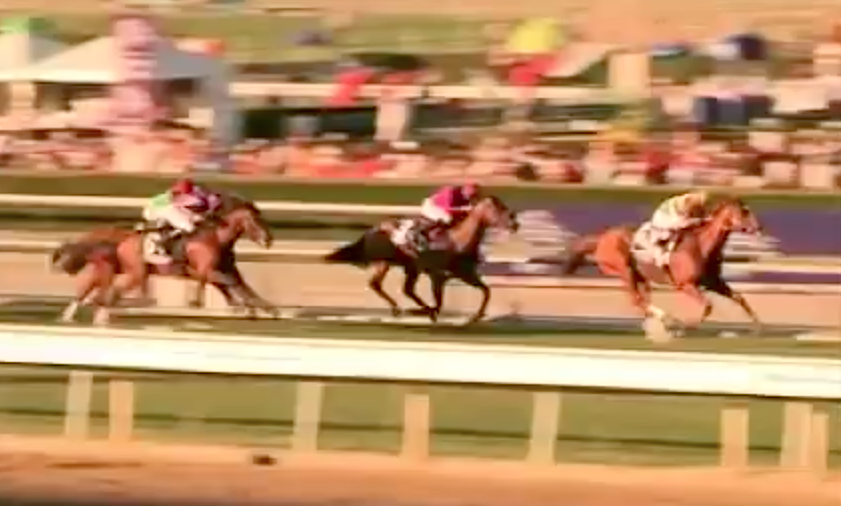
Wise Dan winning the 2012 Breeders' Cup Mile

A week after the Whitney, Wise Dan ran on turf in the Fourstardave Handicap at the same venue. He started the 6/4 favorite and won by five lengths from Corporate Jungle. In September, he took on international competition for the first time when he was sent north to contest the Woodbine Mile in Toronto, which attracted the European-trained horses Cityscape and Worthadd. Velazquez tracked the leaders before moving to the front in the straight, and Wise Dan drew away to win by three and a quarter lengths. By mid-September, he was the highest-rated active racehorse in the United States, according to the World Thoroughbred Racehorse Rankings (I'll Have Another and Bodemeister had been retired).

In October, Wise Dan completed a hat trick on turf by winning the Shadwell Mile at Keeneland. On this occasion, he was ridden by Jose Lezcano and won by two and a quarter lengths from Willcox Inn. After the race, Lopresti announced that the gelding would go to the Breeders' Cup at Santa Anita but declined to specify a race, saying that while he would "lean toward" the Mile, a run in the Classic had not been ruled out.

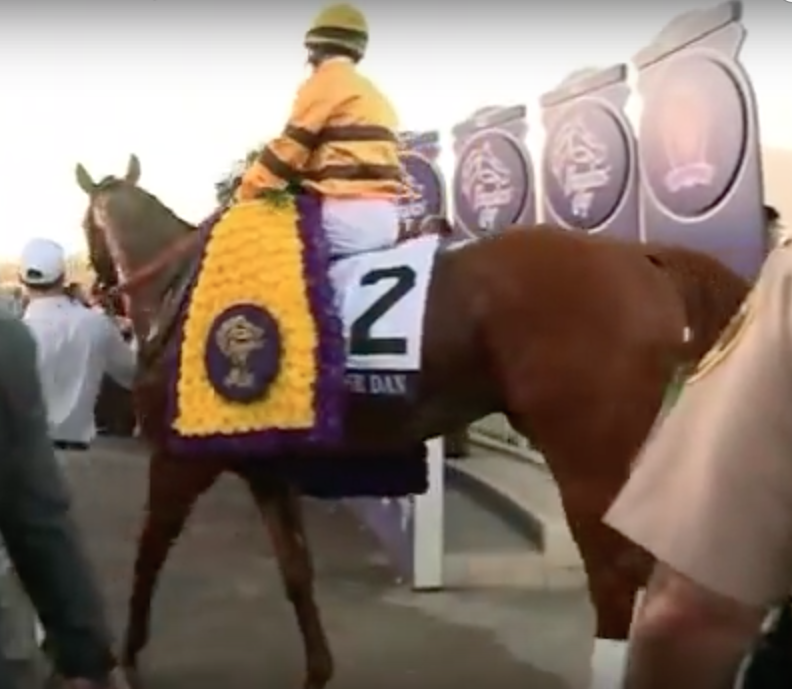
Entering the winners' circle after winning the 2012 Breeders' Cup Mile

On 3 November, Wise Dan contested the Breeders' Cup Mile against a field which included European milers Excelebration and Moonlight Cloud as well as the 2011 Kentucky Derby winner, Animal Kingdom. In what The Washington Post described as "an unequivocal championship performance" Wise Dan overtook the front-running gelding Obviously at the top of the stretch and won from Animal Kingdom with Excelebration in fourth. The time of 1:31.78 was a track record and came within .37 seconds of the world record. To highlight this achievement, the champion miler Dr. Fager set the world record of 1 mile on any surface of 1:32.25 on August 24, 1968.

In the 2012 World Thoroughbred Rankings, Wise Dan was assigned a rating of 129, making him the best horse trained in the United States and the fifth best racehorse in the world. At the Eclipse Awards for the 2012 season, he was voted Champion Male Turf Horse, Champion Older Male Horse and American Horse of the Year. He was the first horse to win all three awards since John Henry in 1981.

=== 2013: six-year-old season ===
Wise Dan began his 2013 campaign in the Maker's 46 Mile Stakes at Keeneland on April 12 when he started the 2/5 favorite and won by a length from Data Link, the winner of the race in 2012. On May 4, at the Kentucky Derby meeting, Wise Dan started 3/5 favourite for the Woodford Reserve Turf Classic, after his main rival, Point of Entry, was scratched shortly before the race. Ridden by Jose Lezcano (Velazquez had been committed to riding Point of Entry), the gelding coped well with the slick conditions, taking the lead in the straight and drawing away to win by four and three quarter lengths from Optimizer.

On June 29, Wise Dan attempted to win the Firecracker Handicap for the second time, carrying 128 pounds in a race run in heavy rain. Velasquez kept the horse "bottled up" until the straight when he accelerated through a gap on the inside rail (brushing against the hedge which serve as the running rail) and going clear to win by two lengths from Lea at odds of 1/5. Wise Dan took his winning run to eight on August 10 when he won the Fourstardave Handicap for the second time, despite carrying 129 pounds, 11 pounds more than any of his opponents. Commenting on the performance, Lopresti said that "to prove that he's a great horse like everybody's talking about, he had to carry that weight... he proved he's a great horse today."

On September 15, 2013, Wise Dan won his ninth consecutive race by taking the Grade I Woodbine Mile for the second time in succession, breaking the track record when he came home in 1:31.75. On October 5, he started 1/2 favorite to win his second Shadwell Turf Mile Stakes, a race which was switched to the synthetic track at Keeneland after heavy rain made the turf course unraceable. In a huge upset, Wise Dan failed to catch the front-running four-year old Silver Max, being beaten one and a quarter lengths. He concluded his campaign by attempting to repeat his 2012 victory in the Breeders' Cup Mile. He started 4/5 favourite ahead of British challenger Olympic Glory, three-year-old gelding No Jet Lag, and Silver Max. With Velasquez having been hospitalized as the result of a fall earlier on the card, Lezcano took over the ride on Wise Dan. The horse stumbled exiting the starting gate and was well behind in the early stages as Obviously set a very strong pace. The favourite produced his customary strong late run in the straight to take the lead well inside the final furlong and won by three quarters of a length from Za Approval.

In the 2013 World's Best Racehorse Rankings, Wise Dan was given a rating of 129, making him the third-best racehorse in the world, the best miler, and the best racehorse in North America. He repeated his successes of the previous year in the Eclipse Awards for 2013, being voted Champion Male Turf Horse, Champion Older Male and Horse of the Year.

=== 2014: seven-year-old season ===
Wise Dan began his 2014 campaign by winning the Grade I Maker's 46 Mile Stakes at 2-5 odds over Kaigun on the turf at Keeneland on April 11, running from the #3 post position in a six-horse field with Velazquez back aboard. The winning time was 1:34.91 On May 3, the same day as the 2014 Kentucky Derby, he won the Woodford Reserve Turf Classic, running a mile and an eighth instead of his usual mile and beating Seek Again by a head.

On May 16, Wise Dan became distressed after his morning workout and was sent to the Rood & Riddle Equine Hospital. An ultrasound scan revealed an intestinal abnormality, and the gelding underwent emergency surgery for horse colic. After repair of a piece of intestine that had "looped" over itself, a "best case scenario" for colic surgery, the horse was anticipated to be out for six to eight weeks of recovery time, but the issue was not career-ending.

After a break of over three months, Wise Dan returned in the Bernard Baruch Handicap at Saratoga on August 30. He won by a nose from Optimizer, to whom he was conceding eleven pounds. On October 4, Wise Dan contested the Shadwell Turf Mile again, with his opponents including Silver Max and Optimizer. He came from well off the pace to win in a time of 1:35.6, with Grand Arch second and Sayaan third. On 12 October, LoPresti noticed swelling in the horse's ankle and ordered an x-ray examination which revealed a "non-displaced fracture at the bottom of the cannon bone". Although the injury was expected to heal without surgery, the gelding was not entered in the Breeders' Cup. Discussing Wise Dan's future, Fink said, "Dr Bramlage recommends that we wait at least 30 days and assess his progress before we make any further decisions. He is seven years old, with 30 starts in his career, so we'll let him show us what to do next... He'll be retired if it doesn't grow back normal."

He was given several months off to heal from his injury and returned to training in mid-2015. He was progressing well and pointed to a return in the Woodbine Mile, the only two-time winner and the track record holder for the distance, on September 13. However, the week prior to the race, he developed a tear on the outside edge of his tendon, unrelated to his previous injury, and was retired on September 7, 2015. John Velasquez said Wise Dan is the "greatest horse" he has ever ridden.

== Retirement ==
After the end of his track career, Wise Dan spent his retirement at LoPresti's farm. In 2020 his former trainer said "He's living with his brother Successful Dan, here at our farm. He's happy as can be. He gets a lot of visitors to see him. We took him over to Old Friends last summer, they had a Wise Dan Day over there, it was really incredible the people that came to see him, the fans that came to see him, and how much money was raised... He walked off that trailer, around that place, like he owned it. He's still a pretty incredible horse. He has a different personality than most horses."

Wise Dan was voted into the American Hall of Fame in 2020 although the induction ceremony was postponed until 2021 owing to the COVID-19 pandemic.

== Pedigree ==
Pedigree of Wise Dan (USA), chestnut gelding, 2007
Sire Wiseman's Ferry (USA) 1999	Hennessy (USA); 1993	Storm Cat	Storm Bird
Sire Wiseman's Ferry (USA) 1999	Hennessy (USA); 1993	Storm Cat	Terlingua
Sire Wiseman's Ferry (USA) 1999	Hennessy (USA); 1993	Island Kitty	Hawaii
Sire Wiseman's Ferry (USA) 1999	Hennessy (USA); 1993	Island Kitty	T. C. Kitten
Sire Wiseman's Ferry (USA) 1999	Emmaus (USA); 1994	Silver Deputy	Deputy Minister
Sire Wiseman's Ferry (USA) 1999	Emmaus (USA); 1994	Silver Deputy	Silver Valley
Sire Wiseman's Ferry (USA) 1999	Emmaus (USA); 1994	La Affirmed	Affirmed
Sire Wiseman's Ferry (USA) 1999	Emmaus (USA); 1994	La Affirmed	La Mesa
Dam Lisa Danielle (USA) 1994	Wolf Power (SAF); 1978	Flirting Around	Round Table
Dam Lisa Danielle (USA) 1994	Wolf Power (SAF); 1978	Flirting Around	Happy Flirt
Dam Lisa Danielle (USA) 1994	Wolf Power (SAF); 1978	Pandora	Casabianca
Dam Lisa Danielle (USA) 1994	Wolf Power (SAF); 1978	Pandora	Blue Siren
Dam Lisa Danielle (USA) 1994	Askmysecretary (USA); 1982	Secretariat	Bold Ruler
Dam Lisa Danielle (USA) 1994	Askmysecretary (USA); 1982	Secretariat	Somethingroyal
Dam Lisa Danielle (USA) 1994	Askmysecretary (USA); 1982	Laquiola	Lyphard
Dam Lisa Danielle (USA) 1994	Askmysecretary (USA); 1982	Laquiola	Kalila (Family 5-h)

== See also ==
- List of racehorses
