= Miesque's Approval =

American-bred Thoroughbred racehorse

- Sire: Miesque's Son
- Grandsire: Mr. Prospector
- Dam: Win Approval
- Damsire: With Approval
- Sex: Stallion
- Foaled: 1999
- Country: United States
- Color: Bay
- Breeder: Live Oak Plantation Stud
- Owner: Live Oak Plantation Racing
- Trainer: Martin D. Wolfson
- Record: 41: 12-10-5
- Earnings: US$2,648,879

Major wins
- Pilgrim Stakes (2001); Kent Breeders' Cup Stakes (2002); Bonnie Heath Turf Cup Handicap (2002); Old Ironsides Stakes (2004); Firecracker Breeders' Cup Handicap (2006); Maker's Mark Mile Handicap (2006); Red Bank Stakes (2006); Sunshine Millions Turf Stakes (2006) Breeders' Cup wins: Breeders' Cup Mile (2006)

Awards
- American Champion Male Turf Horse (2006)

Miesque's Approval (foaled March 3, 1999 in Florida) is an American Thoroughbred racehorse who won the 2006 Breeders' Cup Mile and was voted that year's American Champion Male Turf Horse. He was bred and raced by Charlotte Weber's Live Oak Plantation and trained by Marty Wolfson.

Retired early into the 2007 racing season, Miesque's Approval was sold to Kwazulu Natal Breeders Club and the Scott Brothers's Highdown Stud in Kwazulu-Natal, South Africa. Under the sales agreement, Live Oak Stud retained Northern Hemisphere breeding rights to the horse.

== Pedigree ==
Pedigree of Miesque's Approval
Sire Miesque's Son	Mr. Prospector	Raise a Native	Native Dancer
Sire Miesque's Son	Mr. Prospector	Raise a Native	Raise You
Sire Miesque's Son	Mr. Prospector	Gold Digger	Nashua
Sire Miesque's Son	Mr. Prospector	Gold Digger	Sequence
Sire Miesque's Son	Miesque	Nureyev	Northern Dancer
Sire Miesque's Son	Miesque	Nureyev	Special
Sire Miesque's Son	Miesque	Pasadoble	Prove Out
Sire Miesque's Son	Miesque	Pasadoble	Santa Quilla
Dam Win Approval	With Approval	Caro	Fortino
Dam Win Approval	With Approval	Caro	Chambord
Dam Win Approval	With Approval	Passing Mood	Buckpasser
Dam Win Approval	With Approval	Passing Mood	Cool Mood
Dam Win Approval	Negotiator	Hoist The Flag	Tom Rolfe
Dam Win Approval	Negotiator	Hoist The Flag	Wavy Navy
Dam Win Approval	Negotiator	Geneva	Gulf-Weed
Dam Win Approval	Negotiator	Geneva	Anglofila
