= Woodbine Mile =

Annuan horse race in Toronto, Canada

- Class: Grade I
- Location: Woodbine Racetrack; Toronto, Ontario, Canada
- Inaugurated: 1988
- Race type: Thoroughbred – Flat racing
- Website: RICOH WOODBINE MILE

Race information
- Distance: 1 mile (8 furlongs)
- Surface: Turf
- Track: Left-handed
- Qualification: Three-year-olds and up
- Weight: Weight-For-Age
- Purse: Can$1,000,000 (2021)

The Woodbine Mile is a Grade I stakes race on turf for Thoroughbred racehorses three years old and up held annually in mid September at Woodbine Racetrack in Toronto, Canada. Currently sponsored by Ricoh, the Woodbine Mile offers a purse of Can$1,000,000.

Part of the Breeders' Cup Challenge series, the winner of the Woodbine Mile automatically qualifies for the Breeders' Cup Mile.

The inaugural race in 1988 was sponsored by Molson Breweries with a purse of $750,000 and run as the Molson Export Challenge, reflecting the name of the company's flagship beer. It was changed to the Molson Export Million when the purse was increased to $1 million. In 1999, under new sponsorship it was renamed and raced as the Atto Mile until 2006.

Since inception, the race has been run at three different distances:

- 1 mile on turf: 1997–present
- 1 1/8 miles on dirt: 1991–1996
- 1 1/4 miles on dirt: 1988–1990

Originally restricted to three-year-olds on the dirt, with the modification to one mile on turf in 1997 the race was also made open to older horses. As a result of the change from dirt to turf, the race was ungraded in 1997 and 1998.

== Historical notes ==
In 2005, the Brazilian horse, Leroidesanimaux, set the record for the largest margin of victory at seven and three-quarter lengths while carrying the highest weight of any winner in the race's history at 124 pounds.

In 2009, Ventura became the first female to win this race in 13 years. In the process, she also set the record time of 1:32.04. Wise Dan broke this record in 2013 while becoming the first two-time winner of the race.

== Records ==
Time record:

- 1:31.75 – Wise Dan (2013) (at current distance)

Most wins

- 2 – Wise Dan (2012, 2013)
- 2 – Notable Speech (2025, 2026)

Most wins by an owner:

- 4 – Sam-Son Farm (1991, 1999, 2004, 2019)
- 4 – Godolphin (2022, 2023, 2025, 2026)

Most wins by a jockey:

- 5 – John R. Velazquez (2000, 2005, 2012, 2013, 2017)

Most wins by a trainer:

- 4 – Neil D. Drysdale (1989, 1998, 2003, 2006)
- 4 – Charlie Appleby (2022, 2023, 2025, 2026)

== Winners ==
Year	Winner	Age	Jockey	Trainer	Owner	Time
2026	Notable Speech	5	William Buick	Charlie Appleby	Godolphin	1:33.86
2025	Notable Speech	4	William Buick	Charlie Appleby	Godolphin	1:35.33
2024	Win for the Money	5	Patrick Husbands	Mark E. Casse	Live Oak Plantation	1:32.11
2023	Master of The Seas	5	William Buick	Charlie Appleby	Godolphin	1:33.79
2022	Modern Games	3	William Buick	Charlie Appleby	Godolphin	1:32.77
2021	Town Cruise	6	Daisuke Fukumoto	Brandon Greer	Brandon Greer	1:35.14
2020	Starship Jubilee	7	Justin Stein	Kevin Attard	Blue Heaven Farm	1:32.06
2019	El Tormenta	4	Eurico Rosa da Silva	Gail Cox	Sam-Son Farm	1:32.60
2018	Oscar Performance	4	José L. Ortiz	Brian A. Lynch	Amerman Racing LLC	1:33.12
2017	World Approval	5	John R. Velazquez	Mark E. Casse	Live Oak Plantation	1:33.05
2016	Tepin	5	Julien Leparoux	Mark E. Casse	Robert Masterson	1:34.13
2015	Mondialiste (IRE)	5	Feargal Lynch	David O'Meara	Sandra & Geoff Turnbull	1:36.66
2014	Trade Storm (GB)	6	Jamie Spencer	David Simcock	Qatar Racing	1:36.87
2013	Wise Dan	6	John R. Velazquez	Charles LoPresti	Morton Fink	1:31.75
2012	Wise Dan	5	John R. Velazquez	Charles LoPresti	Morton Fink	1:34.07
2011	Turallure	4	Julien Leparoux	Charles LoPresti	4-D Stables	1:34.92
2010	Court Vision	5	Robby Albarado	Richard E. Dutrow Jr.	IEAH Stables & Resolute Group Stables	1:34.62
2009	Ventura	5	Garrett Gomez	Robert J. Frankel	Juddmonte Farms	1:32.04
2008	Rahy's Attorney	4	Slade Callaghan	Ian Black	Ellie Boje Farm et al.	1:36.14
2007	Shakespeare	6	Garrett Gomez	Kiaran McLaughlin	Dell Ridge Farm / W. Schettine	1:33.58
2006	Becrux	4	Patrick Valenzuela	Neil D. Drysdale	Team Valor, Gary Barber	1:33.99
2005	Leroidesanimaux	5	John R. Velazquez	Robert J. Frankel	T N T Stud	1:35.08
2004	Soaring Free	5	Todd Kabel	Mark Frostad	Sam-Son Farm	1:32.72
2003	Touch of the Blues	6	Kent Desormeaux	Neil D. Drysdale	Gainsborough Farm	1:33.39
2002	Good Journey	6	Pat Day	Wallace Dollase	Flaxman Holdings & M. Jarvis	1:33.27
2001	Numerous Times	4	Patrick Husbands	Sid Attard	Committee Stable	1:32.79
2000	Riviera	6	John R. Velazquez	Robert J. Frankel	Edmund A. Gann	1:33.18
1999	Quiet Resolve †	4	Robert Landry	Mark Frostad	Sam-Son Farm	1:33.19
1998	Labeeb	6	Kent Desormeaux	Neil D. Drysdale	Gainsborough Farm	1:33.00
1997	Geri	5	Chris Antley	William I. Mott	Allen E. Paulson	1:36.20
1996	Skip Away	3	Shane Sellers	Sonny Hine	Carolyn Hine	1:49.00
1995	Peaks and Valleys	3	Julie Krone	Jim Day	Pin Oak Stable	1:50.00
1994	Dramatic Gold	3	Corey Nakatani	David Hofmans	Golden Eagle Farm	1:49.80
1993	Peteski	3	Craig Perret	Roger Attfield	Earle I. Mack	1:49.20
1992	Benburb	3	Richard Dos Ramos	Phil England	Knob Hill Stable	1:51.60
1991	Dance Smartly	3	Pat Day	Jim Day	Sam-Son Farm	1:49.20
1990	Izvestia	3	Don Seymour	Roger Attfield	Kinghaven Farms	2:01.60
1989	Prized	3	Ed Delahoussaye	Neil D. Drysdale	Team Valor	2:02.00
1988	Ballindaggin	3	José A. Santos	John O. Hertler	George Layman Jr.	2:04.60

† – Hawksley Hill won the 1999 race but was disqualified to 4th

== See also ==
- List of Canadian flat horse races
