= Breeders' Cup Mile =

American Thoroughbred horse race

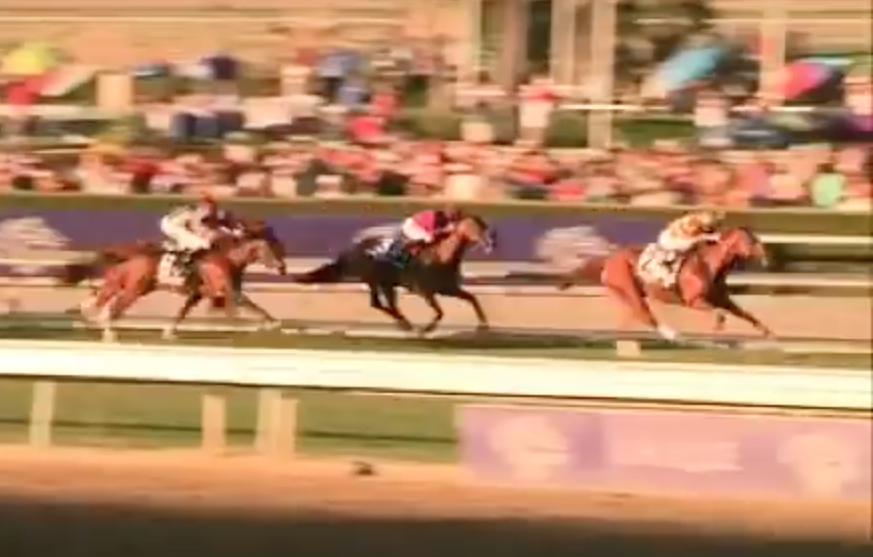
- Wise Dan winning the 2012 Breeders' Cup Mile
- Class: Grade I
- Location: North America
- Inaugurated: 1984
- Race type: Thoroughbred – Flat racing
- Website: Official Breeders' Cup website

Race information
- Distance: One mile (8 furlongs)
- Surface: Turf
- Track: Left-handed
- Qualification: Three years old & up
- Weight: Weight for Age
- Purse: US$2,000,000

The Breeders' Cup Mile is a 1-mile (1.6 km) Grade 1 Weight for Age stakes race for thoroughbred racehorses three years old and up, run on a turf course. It has been conducted annually as part of the Breeders' Cup World Championships since the event's inception in 1984. All Breeders' Cups to date have been held in the United States except for the 1996 event in Canada.

The purse was raised from $1.5 million US to $2 million in 2007.

Freddy Head has won this race twice as a jockey and three times as a trainer.

There is no official stakes record for the Breeders' Cup Mile as it is run on different racecourses each year, some of which are significantly faster than others. In 2012, Wise Dan set a then-course record at Santa Anita with his time of 1:31.78. Although Tourist ran faster than this with a time of 1:31.71 in 2016, he just missed the current Santa Anita course record of 1:31.69.

== Automatic berths ==
Beginning in 2007, the Breeders' Cup developed the Breeders' Cup Challenge, a series of races in each division that allotted automatic qualifying bids to winners of defined races. Each of the fourteen divisions has multiple qualifying races. Note though that one horse may win multiple challenge races, while other challenge winners will not be entered in the Breeders' Cup for a variety of reasons such as injury or travel considerations.

In the Mile division, runners are limited to 14 and there are up to eleven automatic berths. The 2022 "Win and You're In" races were:

1. the L'Ormarins Queen's Plate, a Group 1 race run in January Kenilworth Race Course in South Africa
2. the Gran Premio Club Hipico Falabella, a Grade 1 race run in May at Club Hipico in Chile
3. the Shoemaker Mile, a Grade 1 race run in May at Santa Anita Park in California
4. the Yasuda Kinen, a Grade 1 race run in June at Tokyo Racecourse in Japan
5. the Queen Anne Stakes, a Group 1 race run in June at Royal Ascot in England
6. the Sussex Stakes, a Group 1 race run in July at Goodwood Racecourse in England
7. the Fourstardave Handicap, a Grade 1 race run in August at Saratoga in upstate New York
8. the Prix Jacques Le Marois, a Group I race run in August at Deauville Racecourse in France
9. the Woodbine Mile, a Grade 1 race run in September at Woodbine Racetrack in Canada
10. the Coolmore Turf Mile Stakes, a Grade 1 race at Keeneland in Kentucky
11. the Queen Elizabeth II Stakes, a Group 1 race at Ascot in England

== Records ==
Most wins:

- 3 – Goldikova (2008, 2009, 2010)

Most wins by a jockey:

- 4 – William Buick (2021, 2022, 2023, 2025)

Most wins by a trainer:

- 4 – Charlie Appleby (2021, 2022, 2023, 2025)

Most wins by an owner:

- 6 – Flaxman Holdings / Niarchos family (1987, 1988, 1997, 2002, 2003, 2014)
- 4 – Godolphin (2021, 2022, 2023, 2025)
- 3 – Wertheimer et Frère (2008, 2009, 2010)

== Winners ==
Year	Winner	Age	Jockey	Trainer	Owner	Time	Purse	Grade
2026	Deterministic	5	Kendrick Carmouche	Miguel Clement	St. Elias Stables, Ken Langone, C. Steven Duncker and Vicarage Stable	1:34.52	$2,000,000	I
2025	Notable Speech	4	William Buick	Charlie Appleby	Godolphin	1:33.66	$2,000,000	I
2024	More Than Looks	5	José Ortiz	Cherie DeVaux	Victory Racing Partners	1:32.65	$2,000,000	I
2023	Master of The Seas (IRE)	5	William Buick	Charlie Appleby	Godolphin	1:32.45	$2,000,000	I
2022	Modern Games (IRE)	3	William Buick	Charlie Appleby	Godolphin	1:33.96	$2,000,000	I
2021	Space Blues (IRE)	5	William Buick	Charlie Appleby	Godolphin	1:34.01	$2,000,000	I
2020	Order of Australia (IRE)	3	Pierre-Charles Boudot	Aidan O'Brien	Derrick Smith, Sue Magnier, Michael Tabor, & Anne -Marie O'Brien	1:33.73	$2,000,000	I
2019	Uni† (GB)	5	Joel Rosario	Chad C. Brown	Khalid Abdullah	1:32.45	$2,000,000	I
2018	Expert Eye (GB)	3	Frankie Dettori	Michael Stoute	Khalid Abdullah	1:39.80	$2,000,000	I
2017	World Approval	5	John R. Velazquez	Mark E. Casse	Live Oak Plantation (Charlotte C. Weber)	1:34.55	$2,000,000	I
2016	Tourist	5	Joel Rosario	Bill Mott	Winstar Farm	1:31.71	$2,000,000	I
2015	Tepin†	4	Julien Leparoux	Mark E. Casse	Robert E Masterson	1:36.69	$2,000,000	I
2014	Karakontie (JPN)	3	Stéphane Pasquier	Jonathan Pease	Flaxman Holdings	1:32.88	$2,000,000	I
2013	Wise Dan	6	Jose Lezcano	Charles Lopresti	Morton Fink	1:32.47	$2,000,000	I
2012	Wise Dan	5	John R. Velazquez	Charles Lopresti	Morton Fink	1:31.78	$2,000,000	I
2011	Court Vision	6	Robby Albarado	Dale Romans	Spendthrift Farm	1:37:05	$2,000,000	I
2010	Goldikova† (IRE)	5	Olivier Peslier	Freddy Head	Wertheimer et Frère	1:35.16	$2,000,000	I
2009	Goldikova† (IRE)	4	Olivier Peslier	Freddy Head	Wertheimer et Frère	1:32.26	$2,000,000	I
2008	Goldikova† (IRE)	3	Olivier Peslier	Freddy Head	Wertheimer et Frère	1:33.40	$2,000,000	I
2007	Kip Deville	4	Cornelio Velásquez	Richard E. Dutrow Jr.	IEAH Stables et al.	1:39.78	$2,000,000	I
2006	Miesque's Approval	7	Eddie Castro	Martin D. Wolfson	Live Oak Plantation (Charlotte C. Weber)	1:34.75	$2,000,000	I
2005	Artie Schiller	4	Garrett Gomez	James A. Jerkens	Timber Bay Farm/Denise Walsh	1:36.10	$1,500,000	I
2004	Singletary	4	David R. Flores	Don Chatlos	Little Red Feather Stables	1:36.90	$1,500,000	I
2003	Six Perfections† (FR)	3	Jerry Bailey	Pascal Bary	Flaxman Holdings	1:33.86	$1,500,000	I
2002	Domedriver (IRE)	4	Thierry Thulliez	Pascal Bary	Flaxman Holdings	1:36.88	$1,000,000	I
2001	Val Royal (FR)	5	Jose Valdivia Jr.	Julio Canani	David S. Milch	1:32.05	$1,000,000	I
2000	War Chant	3	Gary Stevens	Neil Drysdale	Irving & Marjorie Cowan	1:34.60	$1,000,000	I
1999	Silic (FR)	4	Corey Nakatani	Julio Canani	J. Terrence Lanni	1:34.20	$1,000,000	I
1998	Da Hoss	6	John R. Velazquez	Michael W. Dickinson	Prestonwood Farm & Wallstreet Stables	1:35.20	$1,000,000	I
1997	Spinning World	4	Cash Asmussen	Jonathan E. Pease	Flaxman Holdings	1:32.60	$1,000,000	I
1996	Da Hoss	4	Gary Stevens	Michael W. Dickinson	Prestonwood Farm & Wallstreet Stables	1:35.80	$1,000,000	I
1995	Ridgewood Pearl† (GB)	3	Johnny Murtagh	John Oxx	Anne Coughlan	1:43.65	$1,000,000	I
1994	Barathea (IRE)	4	Frankie Dettori	Luca Cumani	Sheikh Mohammed & G. W. Leigh	1:34.40	$1,000,000	I
1993	Lure	4	Mike E. Smith	C. R. McGaughey III	Claiborne Farm	1:33.40	$1,000,000	I
1992	Lure	3	Mike E. Smith	C. R. McGaughey III	Claiborne Farm & The Gamely Corp.	1:32.80	$1,000,000	I
1991	Opening Verse	5	Pat Valenzuela	Richard J. Lundy	Allen E. Paulson	1:37.40	$1,000,000	I
1990	Royal Academy	3	Lester Piggott	Vincent O'Brien	Classic Ire Stable	1:35.20	$1,000,000	I
1989	Steinlen (GB)	6	José A. Santos	D. Wayne Lukas	Daniel Wildenstein	1:37.20	$1,000,000	I
1988	Miesque†	4	Freddy Head	François Boutin	Stavros Niarchos	1:38.60	$1,000,000	I
1987	Miesque†	3	Freddy Head	François Boutin	Stavros Niarchos	1:32.80	$1,000,000	I
1986	Last Tycoon (IRE)	3	Yves Saint-Martin	Robert Collet	Richard C. Strauss	1:35.20	$1,000,000	I
1985	Cozzene	5	Walter Guerra	Jan H. Nerud	John A. Nerud	1:35.00	$1,000,000	I
1984	Royal Heroine† (IRE)	4	Fernando Toro	John Gosden	Robert Sangster	1:32.60	$1,000,000	I

† Indicates filly/mare

== See also ==
- Breeders' Cup Mile "top three finishers" and starters
- Breeders' Cup World Thoroughbred Championships
- American thoroughbred racing top attended events
