= Husson =

Husson may refer to:

- Husson (surname), including a list of people with the name
- Husson University, Bangor, Maine, U.S.
- Husson (commune), in the Manche department, France
- Husson (horse), an Argentine racehorse

== See also ==
- Le Rosier de Madame Husson, a novella by Guy de Maupassant
- Husson's yellow bat
- Hussong, a German surname
