= Gran Premio República Argentina =

G1 horse race in Argentina

- Class: Group 1
- Inaugurated: 1979

Race information
- Distance: 2000 meters
- Surface: Dirt
- Track: Hipódromo Argentino de Palermo
- Qualification: Three-years-old and up
- Weight: Weight for age
- Purse: $206,000,000 ARS (2026); 1st: $100,000,000 ARS

The Gran Premio República Argentina (also known as "El República") is a Group 1 horse race run at Hipódromo Argentino de Palermo in Buenos Aires, Argentina, open to horses three years old or older. It is currently run over a distance of 2000 metres (1.2 mi) on the dirt.

== History ==
The Gran Premio República Argentina was first run in 1979 to take the place of the Gran Premio Carlos Pellegrini at Hipódromo Argentino de Palermo when it returned to Hipódromo de San Isidro.

The Gran Premio República Argentina was run variously in January and April before settling on its current date of May 1, on which it is run on the same card as the Group 1 Gran Premio Jorge de Atucha, Group 1 Gran Premio Montevideo, Group 1 Gran Premio Ciudad de Buenos Aires, Group 1 Gran Premio de Las Américas, and Group 1 Gran Premio Criadores. The Gran Premio República Argentina has been run at a variety of distances, including:

- 3000 meters (1979–1989)
- 2500 meters (1990–2006)
- 2000 meters (2007–present)

== Records since 1989 ==
Speed record:

- 2000 meters (current distance): 1:57.85 – El Margot (2016)
- 2500 meters: 2:32.65 – Azagal (1994)
- 3000 meters: 3:12.23 – Larabee (1989)

Greatest winning margin:

- 9 lengths – Alpino Fitz (1997)

Most wins:

- 2 – El Margot (2016, 2017)
- 2 – Need You Tonight (2025, 2026)

Most wins by a jockey:

- 4 – Pablo Gustavo Falero (1994, 1995, 2003, 2009)
- 4 – Jorge Valdivieso (1998, 2001, 2004, 2006)
- 3 – José Ricardo Méndez (2005, 2010, 2011)

Most wins by a trainer:

- 4 – Ernesto Eusebio Romero (2001, 2004, 2010, 2011)
- 4 – Roberto Pellegatta (2002, 2021, 2025, 2026)
- 3 – Juan Carlos Maldotti (1994, 1995, 2003)

Most wins by an owner:

- 2 – Stud Tori (1994, 1995)
- 2 – Stud Don Luis (2016, 2017)
- 2 – Haras El Wing (2025, 2026)

Most wins by a breeder:

- 3 – Haras El Turf (1990, 1999, 2005)
- 3 – Haras La Quebrada (1992, 2009, 2011)
- 3 – Haras Firmamento (1997, 2001, 2004)

== Winners since 1989 ==
Year	Winner	Age	Jockey	Trainer	Owner	Breeder	Distance	Time	Margin	Ref
2026	Need You Tonight	4	William Pereyra	Roberto Pellegatta	Haras El Wing	Haras El Wing	2000 meters	2:03.21	1 length	
2025	Need You Tonight	3	M. Aserito Rodríguez	Roberto Pellegatta	Haras El Wing	Haras El Wing	2000 meters	1:59.73	3 lengths	
2024	El Kódigo	3	Gustavo E. Calvente	Juan Franco Saldivia	Juan Antonio	Haras Marovi	2000 meters	1:58.26	Neck	
2023	Miriñaque	6	F. Fernandes Gonçalves	María Cristin Muñoz	Stud Parque Patricios	Haras de la Pomme	2000 meters	1:57.93	2 1/2 lengths	
2022	Nievre	4	Estebán E. Torres	Edgardo Oscar Martucci	Pedro Rodolfo	Haras Carampangue	2000 meters	1:59.41	Head	
2021	Tetaze	4	William Pereyra	Roberto Pellegatta	Stud Egalite de 9	Haras Bioart	2000 meters	1:58.24	2 lengths	
2020	Race not run									
2019	Alampur	4	Wilson R. Moreyra	Jorge A. Mayansky Neer	Stud Asuncion	Haras Santa Ines	2000 meters	1:59.25	Head	
2018	Logrado	3	Wilson R. Moreyra	Jorge A. Mayansky Neer	Stud Aleluya	Haras Avourneen	2000 meters	1:58.50	5 lengths	
2017	El Margot	5	Altair Domingos	Enrique Martín Ferro	Stud Don Luis	María Succession Aramburu Luis	2000 meters	1:59.80	3 lengths	
2016	El Margot	4	Altair Domingos	Enrique Martín Ferro	Stud Don Luis	María Succession Aramburu Luis	2000 meters	1:57.85	3/4 length	
2015	Rio Vettel	3	Walter Ariel Aguirre	Isidoro L. San Millan	Stud La Frontera	Francisco Fraguas	2000 meters	2:01.18	2 lengths	
2014	Mystery Train	3	Marios Luis Leyes	Marcelo Ambrosio Arce	Stud Mate y Venga	Haras Arroyo de Luna	2000 meters	1:59.87	3 lengths	
2013	Di Giorgio	3	Eduardo Ortega Pavón	Nicolás Alfredo Gaitán	Haras Pozo de Luna	Haras Futuro	2000 meters	1:59.79	6 lengths	
2012	Expressive Halo	4	Gustavo E. Calvente	Carlos A. Meza Brunel	Stud Axel	Haras Abolengo	2000 meters	2:01.72	Head	
2011	Star Runner	4	José Ricardo Méndez	Ernesto Eusebio Romero	Stud El Zonda	Haras La Quebrada	2000 meters	2:02.37	2 1/2 lengths	
2010	Lingote de Oro	4	José Ricardo Méndez	Ernesto Eusebio Romero	Haras El Angel de Venecia	Haras La Providencia	2000 meters	2:00.12	Head	
2009	Calidoscopio	5	Pablo Gustavo Falero	Santillán G. Frenkel	Stud Doña Pancha	Haras La Quebrada	2000 meters	2:01.55	Neck	
2008	Eyeofthetiger	3	Cardenas E. Talaverano	Ricardo A. Reigert	Stud Don David	Alessandro Arcangeli	2000 meters	2:02.40	3 lengths	
2007	Portri Flash	4	Carlos S. Méndez Sotelo	Cleber R. Sanguinetti	Stud Gavroche	Haras Gavroche	2000 meters	2:00.01	1/2 neck	
2006	Badajo	4	Jorge Valdivieso	Luciano Juan Parisi	Stud Los Cerrillos	Haras Vacacion	2500 meters	2:34.34	1 1/2 lengths	
2005	Roots	4	José Ricardo Méndez	Eduardo Carlos Tadei	Haras El Turf	Haras El Turf	2500 meters	2:33.68	5 lengths	
2004	Mr. Redford	3	Jorge Valdivieso	Ernesto Eusebio Romero	Stud Gabigu	Haras Firmamento	2500 meters	2:33.41	DQ	
2003	Rey Rex	5	Pablo Gustavo Falero	Juan Carlos Maldotti	Stud Américo A.	Haras La Borinqueña	2500 meters	2:36.27	1 length	
2002	Dr. Ciro	3	Juan Carlos Noriega	Roberto Pellegatta	Stud F.F.C.	Zubizarreta J. & Curutchet Jorge O.	2500 meters	2:34.17	2 1/2 lengths	
2001	Maipo Fitz	3	Jorge Valdivieso	Ernesto Eusebio Romero	Stud Carmari	Haras Firmamento	2500 meters	2:34.78	1/2 length	
2000	Sei Mi	3	Horacio E. Karamanos	José Luis Palacios	Stud Mirko	Haras Las Dos Manos	2500 meters	2:36.76	2 lengths	
1999	Desirable	4	José A. Padilla	Luis F. Riviello	José Ianita	Haras El Turf	2500 meters	2:37.20	v.m.	
1998	Lazy Lode	3	Jorge Valdivieso	Elias Pascual Domingo	Thoroughbred Co	Haras San Ignacio de Loyola	2500 meters	2:34.23	DQ	
1997	Alpino Fitz	3	Horacio E. Karamanos	Jorge Luis Viego	Haras Los Tres Vasquitos	Haras Firmamento	2500 meters	2:33.23	9 lengths	
1996	Cóndor Cal	3	Jactino R. Herrera	Herman Garcia Ariel	Haras Cumeneyen	Haras Cumeneyen	2500 meters	2:35.17	2 lengths	
1995	Potridoon	4	Pablo Gustavo Falero	Juan Carlos Maldotti	Stud Tori	Haras La Madrugada	2500 meters	2:36.65	1 length	
1994	Azagal	3	Pablo Gustavo Falero	Juan Carlos Maldotti	Stud Tori	Haras La Madrugada	2500 meters	2:32.65	5 lengths	
1993	Cayumanque	3	Pedro Ceron	Delfin Bernal Gonzalez	Dadinco	Haras Dadinco	2500 meters	2:33.11	3 lengths	
1992	Oceanside	4	Jactino R. Herrera	Carlos Alberto Zarlengo	Haras La Quebrada	Haras La Quebrada	2500 meters	2:36.20	Head	
1991	Romanee Conti	3	Natalio D. Mezzotero		Stud Ernestito	Haras Ojo de Agua	2500 meters	2:36.00	Head	
1990	Ultrasonido	4		Luis A. Riviello	Stud Don Henry	Haras El Turf	2500 meters	2:35.99	6 lengths	
1989	Larabee	5			Stud Faruk		3000 meters	3:12.23		

== Earlier winners ==
- 1979: Habanico
- 1980: Propicio
- 1981: Babor
- 1982: New Dandy
- 1983: Mat-Boy
- 1984: El Asesor
- 1985: Oversea
- 1986: Fain
- 1987: Hidalgante
- 1988: Race not run
