= Gran Premio Criadores =

G1 horse race in Argentina

- Class: Group 1
- Inaugurated: 1884

Race information
- Distance: 2000 meters
- Surface: Dirt
- Track: Hipódromo Argentino de Palermo
- Qualification: Three-year-old and up fillies and mares
- Weight: Weight for age
- Purse: $95,850,000 ARS (2026); 1st: $45,000,000 ARS

The Gran Premio Criadores is a Group 1 horse race run at Hipódromo Argentino de Palermo in Buenos Aires, Argentina, open to horses three years old or older. It is currently run over a distance of 2000 metres (1.2 mi) on the dirt.

The Gran Premio Criadores is a Breeders' Cup Challenge Series race, with the winner gaining an automatic berth and free entry for the Breeders' Cup Distaff.

== History ==
The Gran Premio Criadores was inaugurated in 1884. The race was not run 1935–1949.

The Gran Premio Criadores has been run at a number of distances, including:

- 2500 meters (1950–2007)
- 2000 meters (2008–present)

The Gran Premio Criadores is generally run on May 1, along with the Group 1 Gran Premio Jorge de Atucha, Group 1 Gran Premio Montevideo, Group 1 Gran Premio Ciudad de Buenos Aires, Group 1 Gran Premio de Las Américas, and Group 1 Gran Premio República Argentina.

== Records since 1988 ==
Speed record:

- 2000 meters (current distance): 1:58.97 – Belleza de Arteaga (2023)
- 2500 meters: 2:31.32 – Indianita (1996)

Greatest winning margin:

- 9 lengths – Malprensa & Ollagua (2011), Topacio (1989)

Most wins:

Since 1988, no horse has won the Gran Premio Criadores more than once. Prior to that, the race was won twice by Pitanga (1897 & 1898), Japónica (1925 & 1926), and Ishkra (1987, 1988).

Most wins by a jockey:

- 8 – Pablo Gustavo Falero (1989, 1996, 1997, 2002, 2006, 2007, 2008, 2016)
- 3 – Jorge Valdivieso (1991, 1993, 1999)
- 3 – Rubén Emilio Laitán (1994, 2000, 2001)
- 3 – Juan Carlos Noriega (2009, 2012, 2018)

Most wins by a trainer:

- 8 – Juan Carlos Maldotti (1995, 1996, 1997, 2002, 2003, 2006, 2007, 2009)
- 3 – Juan Bautista Udaondo (2008, 2011, 2017)

Most wins by an owner:

- 6 – Haras Santa Maria de Araras (1991, 1993, 1999, 2006, 2012, 2013)
- 3 – Haras La Providencia (2001, 2005, 2007)

Most wins by a breeder:

- 4 – Haras Santa Maria de Araras (1991, 1993, 2012, 2013)
- 3 – Haras Vacacion (1996, 2007, 2008)
- 3 – Haras Firmamento (2000, 2004, 2025)

== Winners since 1988 ==
Year	Winner	Age	Jockey	Trainer	Owner	Breeder	Distance	Time	Margin	Ref
2026	Herd Immunity	5	Francisco Jesús Lavigna	Ángel Domingo Pérez	Stud Volver al Futuro	Haras Triple Alliance	2000 meters	2:03.46	Nose	
2025	Sarawak Rim	3	William Pereyra	Juan Franco Saldivia	Stud Los Melli	Haras Firmamento	2000 meters	2:01.82	1 length	
2024	Che Evasora	5	Jorge Luis Peralta	Marcelo S. Sueldo	Stud Montanta	Patricio Francisco Losinno	2000 meters	2:00.13	1/2 length	
2023	Belleza de Arteaga	5	William Pereyra	Roberto Pellegatta	Stud Chos Malal	Haras Bioart	2000 meters	1:58.97	Head	
2022	La Validada	4	Gustavo E. Calvente	Juan Franco Saldivia	Stud Buenos Muchachos	Eduardo Alfredo Solveyra	2000 meters	2:00.54	Nose	
2021	Blue Stripe	3	Eduardo Ortega Pavón	Nicolás Martín Ferro	Haras Pozo de Luna	Haras La Manija	2000 meters	1:59.01	Head	
2020	Race not run									
2019	Entropia	3	Martín Javier Valle	Jorge F. Meyrelles Torres	Stud El Quinton Lobos	Haras Rodeo Chico	2000 meters	2:00.15	5 lengths	
2018	Sinfonia Fantastica	4	Juan Carlos Noriega	Roberto Pellegatta	Stud Arcangel	Haras Don Arcangel	2000 meters	2:00.10	3 lengths	
2017	Kiriaki	4	Gustavo E. Calvente	Juan Bautista Udaondo	Haras Santa Ines	Haras Santa Ines	2000 meters	2:00.45	Head	
2016	Corona del Inca	4	Pablo Gustavo Falero	Santillán G. Frenkel	Stud Doña Pancha	Haras La Quebrada	2000 meters	1:59.40	Nose	
2015	Furia Cruzada	3	Juan Cruz Villagra	Alfredo F. Gaitán Dassié	Haras Cachagua	Haras Dadinco	2000 meters	2:02.07	1 length	
2014	Sociologa Inc	3	Altair Domingos	Roberto M. Bullrich	Haras La Biznaga	Haras La Biznaga	2000 meters	2:00.30	2 1/2 lengths	
2013	Candy Marie	3	Rodrigo G. Blanco	Carlos D. Etchechoury	Haras Santa Maria de Araras	Haras Santa Maria de Araras	2000 meters	2:01.60	1 1/2 lengths	
2012	Malibu Queen	3	Juan Carlos Noriega	Juan Sebastian Maldotti	Haras Santa Maria de Araras	Haras Santa Maria de Araras	2000 meters	2:02.43	2 lengths	
2011	Malpensa	4	Adrián M. Giannetti	Juan Bautista Udaondo	Haras Santa Ines	Haras Santa Ines	2000 meters	2:02.49	9 lengths	
2010	Foggy Stripes	3	Anselmo Zacarias	Mario Juan Palacios	Stud L.Y R.	Nelson Antonio Graells	2000 meters	1:59.96	Head	
2009†	Cayaya	3	Juan Carlos Noriega	Juan Carlos Maldotti	Stud Tombo	Haras La Magdalena	2000 meters	2:01.44	Dead Heat	
2009†	Ollagua	3	Francisco Raúl Corrales	José Martins Alves	Haras La Providencia	Haras La Providencia	2000 meters	2:01.44	Dead Heat	
2008	Filarmonia	4	Pablo Gustavo Falero	Juan Bautista Udaondo	Haras Vacacion	Haras Vacacion	2000 meters	2:02.87	4 lengths	
2007	Bartola	3	Pablo Gustavo Falero	Juan Carlos Maldotti	Haras La Esperanza	Haras Vacacion	2500 meters	2:36.53	8 lengths	
2006	Malinche	3	Pablo Gustavo Falero	Juan Carlos Maldotti	Haras Santa Maria de Araras	Anselmo Emilio Cavalieri	2500 meters	2:35.33	3 lengths	
2005	Saharian	5	Jacinto R. Herrera	Hugo Miguel Perez Sisto	Haras La Providencia	Haras El Turf	2500 meters	2:39.19	1/2 length	
2004	Perugia Wells	3	Damian Ramella	Juan Carlos Etchechoury	Haras Firmamento	Haras Firmamento	2500 meters	2:40.43	2 1/2 lengths	
2003	Luna Local	3	Horacio J. Betansos	Juan Carlos Maldotti	Stud Ansiedad	Haras Las Dos Manos	2500 meters	2:37.80	2 1/2 lengths	
2002	Tanganyika	4	Pablo Gustavo Falero	Juan Carlos Maldotti	Stud Los Patrios	Haras El Paraiso	2500 meters	2:34.89	1 1/2 head	
2001	New Real Deal	3	Rubén Emilio Laitán	José Martins Alves	Haras La Providencia	Phillips Racing Partnership	2500 meters	2:40.44	Neck	
2000	Crazy Ensign	3	Rubén Emilio Laitán	Juan Carlos Bianchi	Stud El Faruk	Haras Firmamento	2500 meters	2:33.59	1 1/2 lengths	
1999	Bordelaise	3	Jorge Valdivieso	Carlos D. Etchechoury	Haras Santa Maria de Araras	Haras Ojo de Agua	2500 meters	2:39.06	1/2 length	
1998	Rabanilla	5	Jactino R. Herrera	Roberto M. Bullrich	Lucas Brothers	Haras Argentino	2500 meters	2:38.41	5 lengths	
1997	La Soberbia	4	Pablo Gustavo Falero	Juan Carlos Maldotti	Stud Los Patrios	Haras El Paraiso	2500 meters	2:37.26	3 lengths	
1996	Indianita	3	Pablo Gustavo Falero	Juan Carlos Maldotti	Haras Vacacion	Haras Vacacion	2500 meters	2:31.32	1/2 length	
1995	De La Gorra	5	Ricardo R. Ioselli	Juan Carlos Maldotti	Stud Rodeo Chico	Haras La Irenita	2500 meters	2:34.51	3 lengths	
1994	Sidelina	4	Rubén Emilio Laitán	Jorge Luis Viego	Haras Caryjuan	Haras Caryjuan	2500 meters	2:37.45	4 lengths	
1993	Sally Girl	3	Jorge Valdivieso	Domingo Elias Pascual	Haras Santa Maria de Araras	Haras Santa Maria de Araras	2500 meters	2:41.71	3 lengths	
1992	Evidencia	4	Edgardo Gramática	Juan Carlos Etchechoury	Haras Abolengo	Haras Abolengo	2500 meters	2:47.74	2 lengths	
1991	Teresine	4	Jorge Valdivieso	Pedro A. Cacibar	Haras Santa Maria de Araras	Haras Santa Maria de Araras	2500 meters	2:35.98		
1990	Bianca Maria	4	Miguel A. García	Eduardo Oscar Ferro	Haras Ojo de Agua		2500 meters	2:38.00	7 lengths	
1989	Topacio	3	Pablo Gustavo Falero	Raúl A. Amado	Stud Los Apamates	Haras Los Apamates	2500 meters	2:38.82	9 lengths	
1988	Ishkra	5				Haras La Irenita	2500 meters			

† In 2009, there was a dead heat between Cayaya and Ollagua, who finished nine lengths ahead of the rest of the field.

== Earlier winners (incomplete) ==
- 1884: Dichosa
- 1885: La Perla & Cora (DH)
- 1886: May Blossom
- 1887: Angelus
- 1888: Ethiopia
- 1889: Wanda
- 1890: La Prensa
- 1891: Santa Lucía
- 1892: Llana
- 1893: Niobe
- 1894: Satanella
- 1895: Cordelia
- 1896: Esfinge
- 1897: Pitanga
- 1898: Pitanga
- 1899: Yerba Amarga
- 1900: Carina
- 1901: Santa Eugenia
- 1902: Espuma
- 1903: La Fronde
- 1904: Encina
- 1905: Magnética
- 1906: Rosette
- 1907: Olinda
- 1908: Chiripa
- 1909: Sarah Bernhardt
- 1910: Polilla
- 1911: Aphrodite
- 1912: Malpica
- 1913: Cerisette
- 1914: La Maja
- 1915: La Ñatita
- 1916: Pas-si-mal
- 1917: Mamita II
- 1918: Divinidad
- 1919: La Glorieuse
- 1920: Biotzena
- 1921: Carta Blanca
- 1922: Bigornia
- 1923: Pitusa
- 1924: Sierra Leona
- 1925: Japónica
- 1926: Japónica
- 1927: Petarade
- 1928: Hill
- 1929: Clásica
- 1930: Shore Jane
- 1931: Apachinette
- 1932: Côte d'Or
- 1933: Rudeza
- 1934: Meneguina
- 1950: Foxona
- 1951: Duty
- 1952: Satánica
- 1953: Sidérea
- 1954: Baronesa
- 1955: La Maravilla
- 1956: Yauca
- 1957: Precinta
- 1958: Arauea
- 1959: Narva
- 1960: Cantadora
- 1961: Lola Montes
- 1962: Dorine
- 1963: Metatela
- 1964: Lady Silver
- 1965: Astorga
- 1966: Pixy Gal
- 1967: Pastilla
- 1968: Su Alteza
- 1969: La Sevillana
- 1970: Snow Figure
- 1971:
- 1972: Dona Coca
- 1973: Straitly
- 1974: Tuileries
- 1975: Bastonera
- 1976: Hellas
- 1977: Fairly
- 1978: Segur
- 1979: Gioconda
- 1980: First Moon
- 1983: Nice Tradition
- 1986: Agigantada
- 1987: Ishkra
