= Gran Premio Montevideo =

G1 horse race in Argentina

- Class: Group 1
- Inaugurated: 1896

Race information
- Distance: 1500 meters
- Surface: Dirt
- Track: Hipódromo Argentino de Palermo
- Qualification: Two-year-old colts
- Weight: 55 kg
- Purse: $52,500,000 ARS (2026); 1st: $26,000,000 ARS

The Gran Premio Montevideo (previously Premio Montevideo, Premio República Oriental del Uruguay) is a Group 1 thoroughbred horse race run at Hipódromo Argentino de Palermo in Buenos Aires, Argentina, open to two-year-old colts. It is run over a distance of 1500 metres (0.93 mi) on the dirt.

== History ==
The Gran Premio Montevideo was inaugurated in 1896.

From 1954 to 1955, the Gran Premio Montevideo was run under the name Premio República Oriental del Uruguay.

The Gran Premio Montevideo is generally run on May 1, along with the Group 1 Gran Premio Jorge de Atucha, Group 1 Gran Premio Ciudad de Buenos Aires, Group 1 Gran Premio de las Américas-OSAF, Group 1 Gran Premio Criadores, and Group 1 Gran Premio República Argentina.

The Gran Premio Montevideo is considered to be a prelude to the Group 1 Gran Premio Polla de Potrillos.

== Records since 1988 ==
Speed record:

- 1:26.40 – Le Ken (2016)

Greatest winning margin:

- 11 lengths – Painter (1999)

Most wins by a jockey:

- 5 – Pablo Gustavo Falero (1993, 1994, 1996, 2005, 2010)
- 3 – Juan Carlos Noriega (2001, 2003, 2007)
- 3 – F. Fernandes Gonçalves (2019, 2022, 2023)

Most wins by a trainer:

- 5 – Alfredo F. Gaitán Dassié (2008, 2014, 2016, 2017, 2024)
- 4 – Juan Carlos Etchechoury (1999, 2004, 2010, 2012)
- 4 – Roberto Pellegatta (2001, 2003, 2006, 2007)

Most wins by an owner:

- 3 – Stud La Frontera (2004, 2010, 2012)

Most wins by a breeder:

- 5 – Haras Vacacion (1993, 1996, 2007, 2017, 2023)
- 4 – Haras Firmamento (1991, 2004, 2006, 2024)
- 3 – Haras de la Pomme (1994, 1999, 2018)

== Winners since 1988 ==
Year	Winner	Jockey	Trainer	Owner	Breeder	Time	Margin	Ref
2026	Emotion Rate	Wilson Rosario Moreyra	Omar Rubén Farfan	STud Sublime Horse	Donovan C. y María I. Solveyra	1:31.89	Neck	
2025	Amor de Contramano	William Pereyra	Juan Franco Saldivia	Stud Las Canarias	Haras La Pasion and Ojos Claros	1:26.75	10 lengths	
2024	Holy Joy	Martín Javier Valle	Alfredo F. Gaitán Dassié	Haras Firmamento	Haras Firmamento	1:28.31	1 length	
2023	Rammel	F. Fernandes Gonçalves	José Luiz Correa Aranha	Stud Ximena	Haras Vacacion	1:28.19	3/4 length	
2022	Subsanador	F. Fernandes Gonçalves	Nicolás Martín Ferro	Stud Facundito	Haras El Mallin	1:27.07	1 length	
2021	Fiel Amigo	Rodrigo G. Blanco	Lucio Martín Pera	Stud El 30	Haras Santa Ines	1:26.95	5 lengths	
2020	Race not run							
2019	Perro Callejero	F. Fernandes Gonçalves	Sergio Luis Carezzana	Stud El Doctor	Haras Don Florentino	1:27.14	2 1/2 lengths	
2018	El Dt	Pablo Damian Carrizo	José Cristóbal Blanco	Haras de la Pomme	Haras de la Pomme	1:28.25	1 length	
2017	Daniel Boone	Juan Cruz Villagra	Alfredo F. Gaitán Dassié	Haras Santa Elena	Haras Vacacion	1:28.83	2 1/2 lengths	
2016	Le Ken	Juan Cruz Villagra	Alfredo F. Gaitán Dassié	Haras Pozo de Luna	Haras Cachagua & Haras Pozo de Luna	1:26.40	1 1/2 lengths	
2015	Touareg	Eduardo Ortega Pavón	Gustavo E. Scarpello	Stud Mi Metejon	Haras Chenaut	1:29.40	2 lengths	
2014	Galicado	Eduardo Ortega Pavón	Alfredo F. Gaitán Dassié	Haras Cachagua	Haras Abolengo	1:28.41	9 lengths	
2013	Sabayon	Gustavo E. Calvente	Candelario Cáceres	Stud Dos Estrellas	Haras La Pasion	1:28.75	3 lengths	
2012	Pataques	Altair Domingos	Juan Carlos Etchechoury	Stud La Frontera	Ricardo Eduardo Pardiñas	1:31.40	1 1/2 lengths	
2011	Mighty Hunter	Altair Domingos	Omar Fernando Labanca	Stud La Pampita	Inversiones el Catorce	1:29.81	2 1/2 lengths	
2010	Anaerobio	Pablo Gustavo Falero	Juan Carlos Etchechoury	Stud La Frontera	Haras La Madrugada	1:27.55	2 1/2 lengths	
2009	Evocado	Gonzalo Hahn	Raúl Alberto Ramallo	Stud C.S.N.E.	Haras Santa Ines	1:30.74	Neck	
2008	Runforthedoe	Jorge Antonio Ricardo	Alfredo F. Gaitán Dassié	Stud T.N.T.	Stud T.N.T.	1:30.68	3/4 length	
2007	Ilusor	Juan Carlos Noriega	Roberto Pellegatta	Stud Aladino	Haras Vacacion	1:29.20	4 lengths	
2006	Visa Parade	Gustavo E. Calvente	Roberto Pellegatta	Stud Aladino	Haras Firmamento	1:27.83	1/2 neck	
2005	Sebastiano	Pablo Gustavo Falero	Juan Carlos Maldotti	Stud Tres Jotas	Juan José Caligiuri	1:29.14	Head	
2004	Mr. Pensky	Damián Ramella	Juan Carlos Etchechoury	Stud La Frontera	Haras Firmamento	1:28.71	2 lengths	
2003	Little Jim	Juan Carlos Noriega	Roberto Pellegatta	Stud F.F.C.	César Adrián Pasarotti	1:31.28	4 lengths	
2002	Eclipse West	Jacinto R. Herrera	Hector R. Pavarini	Haras Las Telas	Haras Las Telas	1:31.34	1 1/2 lengths	
2001	Petit Club	Juan Carlos Noriega	Roberto Pellegatta	Stud Cris-Fer	Haras Orilla del Monte	1:28.71	5 lengths	
2000	Manicomio Tom	Jorge Valdivieso	Roberto M. Bullrich	Haras La Biznaga	Haras La Biznaga	1:27.94	3 lengths	
1999	Painter	Cardenas E. Talaverano	Juan Carlos Etchechoury	Haras de la Pomme	Haras de la Pomme	1:29.86	11 lengths	
1998	Team	Francisco Arreguy	Juan A. Colucho	Stud Las Telas	Haras La Quebrada	1:28.92	9 lengths	
1997	Handsome Halo	Jacinto R. Herrera	Eduardo M. Martínez de Hoz	Stud Matty	Haras Las Matildes	1:29.30	5 lengths	
1996	Situado	Pablo Gustavo Falero	Juan Carlos Maldotti	Stud J.D.P.M.	Haras Vacacion	1:29.20	1/2 head	
1995	Espaciado	Horacio E. Karamanos	Jorge Luis Viego	Stud Leo	Haras Abolengo	1:29.31	7 lengths	
1994	El Sultan	Pablo Gustavo Falero	Savino R. Pavez	Stud Miryam	Haras de la Pomme	1:27.53	6 lengths	
1993	Pop-Rock	Pablo Gustavo Falero	Jorge D. Marsiglia Aguete	Stud Dos Estrellas	Haras Vacacion	1:31.32	4 lengths	
1992	Vilas Light	Juan Alberto Maciel	Saturnino L. Bello	Stud El Torito	Haras La Biznaga	1:30.34	Neck	
1991	Rockin Fitz	Daniel Jorge Ojeda	Jorge D. Marsiglia Aguete	Stud Nellmar	Haras Firmamento	1:27.66	6 lengths	
1990	Ibero	Ricardo R. Ioselli	Juan Bautista Udaondo	Stud San Ignacio	Haras San Ignacio de Loyola	1:28.71	9 lengths	
1989	Legithor	Elvio Ramón Bortulé	Mariano Ángel Penna	Stud A.J.P.		1:31.99		
1988	Monte Pirata				Haras La Biznaga			

== Previous winners ==
- 1896: Ranquel
- 1897: Pillito
- 1898: Eclat
- 1899: Caprichoso & Dominó (DH)
- 1900: Penitente
- 1901: Stella ƒ
- 1902: Calepino
- 1903: Alcázar
- 1904: Pito
- 1905: Fray Mocho
- 1906: Buchardo
- 1907: Cáustico
- 1908: Young Hermit
- 1909: Cerrito
- 1910: Matero
- 1911: Germano
- 1912: Post Paid
- 1913: Mustafá
- 1914: Papanatas
- 1915: Grey Eyes
- 1916: Palpalá
- 1917: París
- 1918: Clamor
- 1919: Julio César
- 1920: Atención
- 1921: Ranquelino
- 1922: Pashá
- 1923: Pardón
- 1924: Gitanillo & Old Diamond (DH)
- 1925: Tagore
- 1926: Pepino
- 1927: Congreve
- 1928: Gualicho
- 1929: Tresiete
- 1930: Santiago
- 1931: Roisil
- 1932: Luminar
- 1933: Foxtrot
- 1934: Black Arrow ƒ
- 1935: Saltabanco
- 1936: Médicis
- 1937: Vino Puro
- 1938: Petrel
- 1939: Killarney
- 1940: Florin
- 1941: El Chato
- 1942: Zorzalón
- 1943: Supremo
- 1944: Trafalgar
- 1945: Quibu
- 1946: Etwin
- 1947: Nigromante
- 1948: Invernal
- 1949: Enigmatic
- 1950: Mirontón
- 1951: Yatasto
- 1952: Setubal
- 1953: Cachador
- 1954: Jungle King
- 1955: Tatán
- 1956: Winedrop
- 1957: Carapalida
- 1958: Pintor
- 1959: Tombrill
- 1960: Rob Roy
- 1961: Don Milito
- 1962: Tierno
- 1963: Trousseau
- 1964: Gobernado
- 1965: Super Man
- 1966: Forli
- 1967: Mantecón
- 1968: Capitolino
- 1969: Martinet
- 1970: Taino
- 1971: Tropical Sun
- 1972: Hekaton
- 1973: Ecuanime
- 1974: Rosadito
- 1975: Gossuet
- 1976: Crest Pan
- 1977: Cipayo
- 1979: Pulines
- 1980: Alayor ƒ
- 1981:
- 1982: Fort de France
- 1983: Apollón
- 1984: Havildar
- 1985: Bonsoir
- 1986: El Serrano
- 1987: Despotico

ƒ Indicates a filly
