= Fain (horse) =

Argentinian racehorse

- Sire: Dancing Moss
- Grandsire: Ballymoss
- Dam: Fallow's Sister
- Damsire: Worden
- Sex: Stallion
- Foaled: August 30, 1982 (age 43)
- Country: Argentina
- Colour: Bay
- Breeder: Haras Santa Maria de Araras
- Owner: Haras Santa Maria de Araras
- Trainer: Gonzalo Pascual
- Jockey: Jorge Valdivieso
- Record: 7: 7-0-0
- Earnings: ₳305,200 (US$254,189)

Major wins
- Premio Buenos Aires (1986); Gran Premio Comparación (1986); Gran Premio República Argentina (1986); Premio General Belgrano (1986); Gran Premio de Honor (1986); Gran Premio Carlos Pellegrini (1986)

Awards
- Argentine Horse of the Year (1986); Argentine Champion Stayer (1986)

Fain was an undefeated Argentinian thoroughbred racehorse who was the Argentine Horse of the Year and Champion Stayer in 1986.

== Background ==
Fain was bred and owned by Haras Santa Maria de Araras. He was foaled on August 30, 1982. His sire, Dancing Moss, had raced with some success in his native Great Britain, including winning the Jockey Club Cup, before being exported to Argentina for stud duty. He led the Argentine general sire list in 1973 and was third in 1979.

Fain's dam, Fallow's Sister, was unraced and had produced eight foals prior to Fain. Six of these were full siblings to Fain, including stakes winners Flamigera and Fatly, who would be named the 1983 Argentine Champion Three-Year-Old Male and 1984 Argentine Champion Stayer.

Throughout his career, Fain was trained by Gonzalo Pascual, a regular trainer for Haras Santa Maria de Araras. Fain is the leading horse trained by Pascual by number of Group 1 wins and the second leading horse by earnings.

== Racing career ==
Fain started racing as a three-year-old, running once in 1985 to win an 1800-meter allowance race on the dirt at Hipódromo Argentino de Palermo. He started as the favorite at odds of 3.40 and won by one and a half lengths.

Fain's 1986 campaign opened on February 16 with the Group 3 Premio Buenos Aires, a 2200-meter dirt race against older horses at Hipódomo Argentino de Palermo. He again started as the favorite, at odds of 3.60, and outran 6 rivals to win by 4 lengths.

Fain's first race in Group 1 company was on March 9 in the Gran Premio Comparación over 2500 meters on the dirt. For the first time he didn't start as the favorite. Potrillazo, the undefeated winner of the previous year's Gran Premio Nacional and the 1985 Argentine Horse of the Year, was the favorite. Fain won the race by four lengths. In his next race, the Group 1 Gran Premio República Argentina on April 13, Fain stretched out to 3000 meters. He again started as the favorite, at odds of 3.30, and won by 2 lengths. Fain won his next race, the Group 2 Premio General Belgrano over 2500 meters on June 6.

On October 12, in his first race as a four-year-old, Fain ran in the longest race of his career, the Group 1 Gran Premio de Honor, run over 3500 meters. Fain had already beaten the 4 other horses entered against him and started as the favorite at odds of 2.80. During the race, only one horse seriously challenged Fain, Cabileño. Fain won by a head, with a twelve length gap between Cabileño in second place and the third placed horse.

For his final race, Fain was entered in the Group 1 Gran Premio Carlos Pellegrini, his first race at a track other than Hipódromo Argentino de Palermo and his first race on the turf. The field was considered an exceptional one, with 20 other horses were entered, including Potrillazo, El Serrano, who had won that year's Polla de Potrillos, Gran Premio Jockey Club, and Gran Premio Nacional to win the Argentine Triple Crown, Micenas, coming off of a win in the Group 1 Gran Premio Dardo Rocha, 1985 Gran Premio Jockey Club winner Bonsoir, and Grosor, a multiple Group 1 winner from Chile. El Serrano started as the favorite, with Fain the fourth choice at odds of 4.90.

El Serrano was the fastest to break, taking the lead briefly before being passed by Conguero. Coming into the straight, El Serrano regained the lead. With about 200 meters left in the 2400 meter race, El Serrano began to tire, and Fain passed him on the inside. Fain held off the rest of the field to win by a half length in a time of 2:24 flat.

Based on these wins, Fain was named the Argentine Horse of the Year and Champion Stayer for 1986, and his dam was named the Argentine Broodmare of the Year.

== Race record ==
Date	Age	Distance	Surface	Race	Grade	Track	Odds	Field	Finish	Winning (Losing) margin	Jockey	Ref
Oct 18, 1985	3	1800 meters	Dirt	Premio Royal Debonir	Allowance	Hipódromo Argentino de Palermo	3.40*	9	1	1 1/2 lengths	Jorge Valdivieso	
Feb 16, 1986	3	2200 meters	Dirt	Premio Buenos Aires	III	Hipódromo Argentino de Palermo	3.60*	7	1	4 lengths	Jorge Valdivieso	
Mar 9, 1986	3	2500 meters	Dirt	Gran Premio Comparación	I	Hipódromo Argentino de Palermo	6.40	5	1	4 lengths	Jorge Valdivieso	
Apr 13, 1986	3	3000 meters	Dirt	Gran Premio República Argentina	I	Hipódromo Argentino de Palermo	3.30*	5	1	2 lengths	Jorge Valdivieso	
Jun 6, 1986	3	2500 meters	Dirt	Premio General Belgrano	II	Hipódromo Argentino de Palermo		5	1		Jorge Valdivieso	
Oct 12, 1986	4	3500 meters	Dirt	Gran Premio de Honor	I	Hipódromo Argentino de Palermo	2.80*	5	1	Head	Jorge Valdivieso	
Dec 14, 1986	4	2400 meters	Turf	Gran Premio Carlos Pellegrini	I	Hipódromo de San Isidro	4.90	21	1	1/2 length	Jorge Valdivieso	

An asterisk after the odds means Fain was the post time favorite.

== Stud career ==
Fain entered stud in 1987 at Haras San Ignacio De Loyola, covering 60 mares in his first season. He continued to stand stud there until 1991, when he moved to Haras Santa Maria de Araras for one year before returning to Haras San Ignacio de Loyola until his final year at stud, 1993, when he stood at Haras Mariela Y Andrea. He sired 5 stakes winners from 209 foals (2.4%), including Group 1 winners Sally Girl and Good Whisky. He is the damsire of at least 4 stakes winners, including Group 1 winners Safari Girl, Eu Tambem, and Zorro Rojo.

== Pedigree ==
Pedigree of Fain (ARG), bay stallion, foaled August 30, 1982
Sire Dancing Moss (GB) 1964	Ballymoss (GB); 1954	Mossborough (GB)	Nearco (ITY)
Sire Dancing Moss (GB) 1964	Ballymoss (GB); 1954	Mossborough (GB)	All Moonshine (GB)
Sire Dancing Moss (GB) 1964	Ballymoss (GB); 1954	Indian Call (GB)	Singapore (GB)
Sire Dancing Moss (GB) 1964	Ballymoss (GB); 1954	Indian Call (GB)	Flittemere (GB)
Sire Dancing Moss (GB) 1964	Courbette (USA); 1957	Native Dancer (USA)	Polynesian (USA)
Sire Dancing Moss (GB) 1964	Courbette (USA); 1957	Native Dancer (USA)	Geisha (USA)
Sire Dancing Moss (GB) 1964	Courbette (USA); 1957	Gallorette (USA)	Challenger (GB)
Sire Dancing Moss (GB) 1964	Courbette (USA); 1957	Gallorette (USA)	Gallette (GB)
Dam Fallow's Sister (GB) 1968	Worden (FR); 1949	Wild Risk (FR)	Rialto (FR)
Dam Fallow's Sister (GB) 1968	Worden (FR); 1949	Wild Risk (FR)	Wild Violet (FR)
Dam Fallow's Sister (GB) 1968	Worden (FR); 1949	Sans Tares (GB)	Sind (GB)
Dam Fallow's Sister (GB) 1968	Worden (FR); 1949	Sans Tares (GB)	Tara (FR)
Dam Fallow's Sister (GB) 1968	Galloway Queene (GB); 1950	Colombo (GB)	Manna (IRE)
Dam Fallow's Sister (GB) 1968	Galloway Queene (GB); 1950	Colombo (GB)	Lady Nairne (GB)
Dam Fallow's Sister (GB) 1968	Galloway Queene (GB); 1950	Faerie Queen (GB)	Solario (GB)
Dam Fallow's Sister (GB) 1968	Galloway Queene (GB); 1950	Faerie Queen (GB)	Rose of England (GB)

== See also ==
- List of leading Thoroughbred racehorses
