= Gran Premio Ciudad de Buenos Aires =

G1 horse race in Argentina

- Class: Group 1

Race information
- Distance: 1000 meters
- Surface: Dirt
- Track: Hipódromo Argentino de Palermo
- Qualification: Three-years-old and up
- Weight: Weight for age
- Purse: $63,900,000 ARS (2026); 1st: $30,000,000 ARS

The Gran Premio Ciudad de Buenos Aires is a Group 1 horse race run at Hipódromo Argentino de Palermo in Buenos Aires, Argentina, open to horses three years old or older. It is run over a distance of 1000 metres (0.62 mi) on the dirt.

== History ==
The Gran Premio Ciudad de Buenos Aires has been run since at least 1973.

In 1989 and 1991, the Gran Premio Ciudad de Buenos Aires was restricted to winners only.

The Gran Premio Ciudad de Buenos Aires is generally run on May 1, along with the Group 1 Gran Premio Jorge de Atucha, Group 1 Gran Premio Montevideo, Group 1 Gran Premio de las Américas-OSAF, Group 1 Gran Premio Criadores, and Group 1 Gran Premio República Argentina.

== Records since 1989 ==
Speed record:

- :53.57 – Humor Acido (2016)

Greatest winning margin:

- 6 lengths – Paranoide (1993), Wally (1995), Lenovo (2014), & Luthier Blues (2022)

Most wins:

- 2 – Don Juan Tag (1991, 1992)
- 2 – Lenovo (2014, 2015)

Most wins by a jockey:

- 9 – Pablo Gustavo Falero (1997, 1998, 2001, 2002, 2006, 2009, 2012, 2016, 2019)
- 3 – Jorge Antonio Ricardo (2007, 2008, 2010)

Most wins by a trainer:

- 4 – Juan Carlos Maldotti (1998, 2001, 2002, 2006)
- 3 – Juan Carlos Etchechoury (1994, 2000, 2004)
- 3 – Juan Javier Etchechoury (2007, 2008, 2010)
- 3 – Ángel Natividad Bonetoo (2014, 2015, 2024)

Most wins by an owner:

- 5 – Haras La Quebrada (1989, 1994, 1995, 2003, 2013)
- 3 – Haras Vacacion (1998, 2001, 2002)
- 3 – Stud Rubio B. (2007, 2008, 2010)

Most wins by a breeder:

- 8 – Haras La Quebrada (1989, 1994, 1995, 1999, 2003, 2005, 2013, 2019)
- 4 – Haras Vacacion (2001, 2002, 2014, 2015)
- 4 – Haras El Paraiso (2022, 2024, 2025, 2026)
- 3 – Haras La Biznaga (1990, 2004, 2007)

== Winners since 1989 ==
Year	Winner	Age	Jockey	Trainer	Owner	Breeder	Time	Margin	Ref
2026	El Epecuen	5	Juan Cruz Villagra	Miguel Alberto Gómez	Stud Mamina	Haras El Paraiso	:55.84	3/4 length	
2025	El Mejor Recuerdo	5	Eduardo Ortega Pavón	Daniel René Cima	Haras Don Julian	Haras El Paraiso	:55.15	1/2 neck	
2024	Labrado	4	Wilson R. Moreyra	Ángel Natividad Bonetoo	Stud Don Ariel	Haras El Paraiso	:54.57	1/2 length	
2023	Girona Fever ƒ	4	Federico F. Piriz Nuñez	José I. Cuitiño Santos	Stud Uruimporta	Haras El Santo	:53.80	Head	
2022	Luthier Blues	4	Brian Rodrigo Enrique	Alberto Sarno Gonzalo	Stud Kirby's	Haras El Paraiso	:53.98	6 lengths	
2021	Fondo Tropical	3	Rodrigo G. Blanco	Marcelo S. Sueldo	Stud El Basti	Haras La Pasion	:53.59	2 lengths	
2020	Race not run								
2019	Elogiado	5	Pablo Gustavo Falero	Lucas Francisco Gaitán	Haras Santa Elena	Haras La Quebrada	:53.91	1/2 length	
2018	Sublime Boy	3	Edgardo Patriarca	Juan Osvaldo Peñalva	Stud Kevin-Alexis	Haras Rancho Grande	:54.39	1 1/2 lengths	
2017	Glory Seattle	3	Jorge Luis Peralta	Marcelo José Pérez	Stud Ya Veran	Haras Firmamento	:54.03	1/2 neck	
2016	Humor Acido	4	Pablo Gustavo Falero	Carlos Alberto Buxmann	Stud La Tutina	Haras La Pasion	:53.57	1/2 length	
2015	Lenovo	4	Gustavo E. Calvente	Ángel Natividad Bonetoo	Stud La Juventus	Haras Vacacion	:55.02	1 1/2 lengths	
2014	Lenovo	3	Gustavo E. Calvente	Ángel Natividad Bonetoo	Stud La Juventus	Haras Vacacion	:55.10	6 lengths	
2013	Watch Her ƒ	5	Cardenas E. Talaverano	Jacinto Rafael Herrera	Haras La Quebrada	Haras La Quebrada	:54.05	Neck	
2012	Charles King	5	Pablo Gustavo Falero	José Luis Regueiro	Stud La Reina	Haras Panamericano	:54.16	1/2 length	
2011	Sembra Fe ƒ	3	Andrea S. Marinhas	Nicolás Adrián Yalet	Stud Arcangel	Haras El Tala	:55.41	2 1/2 lengths	
2010	Filoso Emperor	5	Jorge Antonio Ricardo	Juan Javier Etchechoury	Stud Rubio B	Haras Firmamento	:55.14	1/2 head	
2009	Que Vida Buena	3	Pablo Gustavo Falero	Carlos D. Etchechoury	Haras Santa Maria de Araras	Haras Santa Maria de Araras	:54.32	1/2 neck	
2008	Lady Sprinter ƒ	4	Jorge Antonio Ricardo	Juan Javier Etchechoury	Stud Rubio B	Gainesway Farm	:56.41	1 length	
2007	Storm Marcopolo	3	Jorge Antonio Ricardo	Juan Javier Etchechoury	Stud Rubio B	Haras La Biznaga	:54.15	1 1/2 lengths	
2006	Anjiz Star ƒ	4	Pablo Gustavo Falero	Juan Carlos Maldotti	Stud América	Jorge Miguel Roberts	:54.43	2 lengths	
2005	Jolly ƒ	5	Gonzalo Hahn	José María Gimenez	Stud Green and Black	Haras La Quebrada	:53.88	1 1/2 lengths	
2004	Forty Doriana ƒ	3	Jorge Valdivieso	Juan Carlos Etchechoury	Haras La Biznaga	Haras La Biznaga	:53.72	3 lengths	
2003	Symbolic ƒ	4	Jacinto R. Herrera	Nicolás Adrián Yalet	Haras La Quebrada	Haras La Quebrada	:54.80	1/2 head	
2002	Rocking Trick	4	Pablo Gustavo Falero	Juan Carlos Maldotti	Haras Vacacion	Haras Vacacion	:54.33	Head	
2001	Beauty Melody ƒ	4	Pablo Gustavo Falero	Juan Carlos Maldotti	Haras Vacacion	Haras Vacacion	:54.92	3 lengths	
2000	Not For Sale	5	Juan Guillermo	Juan Carlos Etchechoury	Stud Franquito	Haras El Candil	:54.76	3/4 length	
1999	Final Meeting	3	Néstor Nicolás Oviedo	Edmundo I. Rodríguez	Haras Las Telas	Haras La Quebrada	:57.34	1 length	
1998	Tough Golda ƒ	5	Pablo Gustavo Falero	Juan Carlos Maldotti	Haras Vacacion	Haras Ojo de Agua	:54.81	1/2 neck	
1997	Emigrant	4	Pablo Gustavo Falero	Carlos A. Alcaraz	Stud San Francisco R.	Haras Abolengo	:55.59	3/4 length	
1996	Preflorada ƒ	4	Guillermo E. Sena	Luis Crosato	Stud Haras Vencedor	Stud Haras Vencedor	:55.80	1 length	
1995	Wally ƒ	3	Jactino R. Herrera	Carlos Alberto Zarlengo	Haras La Quebrada	Haras La Quebrada	:55.64	6 lengths	
1994	Gouache ƒ	4	Jactino R. Herrera	Juan Carlos Etchechoury	Haras La Quebrada	Haras La Quebrada	:55.52	1/2 length	
1993	Paranoide	4	Elvio Ramón Bortulé	Luis Santiago Bedoya	Stud Tuturutaina	Emilio Delgado	:54.96	6 lengths	
1992	Don Juan Tag	4	Fabián Antonio Rivero		Stud Luis A.	Echegaray Acuêa, Ramon Y Cielo de L	:56.66		
1991	Don Juan Tag	3	Jorge Osmar Arana	Héctor Horacio Brandi	Stud Luis A.	Echegaray Acuêa, Ramon Y Cielo de L	:56.87		
1990	Rich Toss ƒ	3	Jorge Valdivieso	Santillán G. Frenkel	Haras La Biznaga	Haras La Biznaga	:56.20	2 lengths	
1989	Spiny ƒ	3	Elvio Ramón Bortulé		Haras La Quebrada	Haras La Quebrada	:58.18		

ƒ Indicates a filly or mare

== Earlier winners (incomplete) ==
- 1973: Flor de Loto ƒ
- 1977: Vampo
- 1978: Solyluz ƒ
- 1979: Gold Sun ƒ & Pariguana ƒ (DH)
- 1980: Villares
- 1981: Osorno
- 1982: Spanish Dancer
- 1983: Emociones ƒ
- 1984: Gran Barba
- 1985: Meliseo
- 1986: Yanick
- 1987: Prodigo
- 1988: Race not run

ƒ Indicates a filly or mare
