= Hussong =

Hussong is a German surname. It comes from the French name Husson (a hypocorism of the Old French personal name Hue or Hugues, itself a variant of the Germanic Hugo, which originates from the Proto-Germanic word hug-, meaning "heart", "mind", "spirit"). Notable people with the surname include:

- Christin Hussong (born 1994), German athlete
- Friedrich Hussong (1878–1943), German journalist
- Günther Hussong (1948–2025), German poet
- Johann Hussong (1863–1928), German businessman who established Hussong's
- Stefan Hussong (born 1965), German classical accordionist and professor
