= Gran Premio Estrellas Classic =

Group 1 horse race in Argentina

- Class: Group 1
- Inaugurated: 1992

Race information
- Distance: 2000 meters
- Surface: Varies
- Track: Hipódromo de San Isidro or Hipódromo Argentino de Palermo
- Qualification: Three-years-old and up
- Purse: $120,000,000 ARS (2026); 1st: $81,000,000 ARS

The Gran Premio Estrellas Classic is a Group 1 horse race that is part of the Carreras de las Estrellas and is open to horses three years old or older. It is run over a distance of 2000 metres (1.2 mi) either on the turf at Hipódromo de San Isidro or on the dirt at the Hipódromo Argentino de Palermo. The Gran Premio Estrellas Classic is considered the feature race of the Carreras de las Estrellas.

== History ==
The Gran Premio Estrellas Classic was added to the Carreras de las Estrellas in its second year, 1992. That first year, the race was restricted to three-year-olds only. Since then, the race has been open to horses three-years-old and up. The Gran Premio Estrellas Classic is inspired by the Breeders' Cup Classic.

With his 1998 victory, El Compinche became the first, and, as of 2024, only, horse to win the Gran Premio Estrellas Classic more than once, although in non-consecutive years.

Refinado Tom won the Gran Premio Estrellas Classic in 1999 as part of his comeback following a disappointed campaign in the United States and three years after his 1996 win the Gran Premio Estrellas Juvenile. He won in stakes record time that still stands as of 2024.

In the 2012 edition, the Gran Premio Estrellas Classic was restricted to winners only.

== Records ==
Speed record:

- 1:57.78 – Refinado Tom (1999)

Greatest winning margin:

- 14 lengths – Contante (2004)

Most wins:

- 2 – El Compinche (1996, 1998)

Most wins by a jockey:

- 6 – Juan Carlos Noriega (2003, 2007, 2015, 2016, 2017, 2019)
- 4 – Jacinto R. Herrera (1996, 1998, 2004, 2005)
- 3 – Gustavo E. Calvente (2008, 2014, 2020)
- 3 – F. Fernandes Gonçalves (2018, 2022, 2024)

Most wins by a trainer:

- 5 – Roberto Pellegatta (2003, 2008, 2014, 2016, 2017)
- 3 – Juan Carlos Etchechoury (1996, 1998, 2018)
- 3 – Ernesto Eusebio Romero (2001, 2010, 2011)

Most wins by an owner:

- 2 – Stud Tori (1992, 1994)
- 2 – Haras La Quebrada (1996, 1998)
- 2 – Stud Las Hormigas (2007, 2013)
- 2 – Stud Dark Horse (2015, 2019)
- 2 – Stud Las Canarias (2016, 2017)
- 2 – Haras Firmamento (2018, 2021)

Most wins by a breeder:

- 5 – Haras Firmamento (1993, 2001, 2016, 2018, 2021)
- 5 – Haras La Quebrada (1996, 1998, 2003, 2007, 2011)
- 3 – Haras La Madrugada (1992, 1994, 2008)
- 3 – Haras Las Dos Manos (2000, 2005, 2006)
- 3 – Haras Abolengo (2004, 2012, 2020)

== Winners ==
Year	Winner	Age	Jockey	Trainer	Owner	Breeder	Surface	Track	Time	Margin	Ref
2026	Neat Colt	3	Juan Cruz Villagra	Gustavo Ernesto Romero	Stud Tramo 20	Haras Orilla del Monte	Turf	Hipódromo de San Isidro	2:03.59	3/4 length	
2025	Need You Tonight	3	M. Aserito Rodríguez	Roberto A. Pellegatta	Haras El Wing	Haras El Wing	Dirt	Hipódromo Argentino de Palermo	2:01.30	2 1/2 lengths	
2024	Vundu	3	F. Fernandes Gonçalves	Nicólas Martín Ferro	Stud Gran Ascochinga	Haras Pozo de Luna	Turf	Hipódromo de San Isidro	2:01.94	1/2 neck	
2023	Natan	3	Adrián M. Giannetti	Carlos D. Etchechoury	Stud Las Monjitas	Haras Carampangue	Turf	Hipódromo de San Isidro	2:01.82	1 1/2 lengths	
2022	Durazzo	3	F. Fernandes Gonçalves	Rubén Alejandro Quiroga	Haras Marías del Sur	Haras Marías del Sur	Dirt	Hipódromo Argentino de Palermo	2:00.74	1 length	
2021	Emotion Orpen	5	Rodrigo G. Blanco	Alfredo F. Gaitán Dassié	Haras Firmamento	Haras Firmamento	Dirt	Hipódromo Argentino de Palermo	1:59.72	2 1/2 lengths	
2020	In Your Honor	7	Gustavo E. Calvente	Sergio Luis Carezzana	Stud El Doctor	Haras Abolengo	Dirt	Hipódromo Argentino de Palermo	1:59.75	2 lengths	
2019	Dandy Del Barrio	3	Juan Carlos Noriega	Juan Franco Saldivia	Stud Dark Horse	Haras La Pasión	Dirt	Hipódromo Argentino de Palermo	1:58.75	1/2 head	
2018	The Great Glory	4	F. Fernandes Gonçalves	Juan Carlos Etchechoury	Haras Firmamento	Haras Firmamento	Dirt	Hipódromo Argentino de Palermo	2:00.10	1 1/2 lengths	
2017	Crazy Icon	3	Juan Carlos Noriega	Roberto Pellegatta	Stud Las Canarias	Haras La Manija	Turf	Hipódromo de San Isidro	2:02.87	4 lengths	
2016	Saltarín Dubai	3	Juan Carlos Noriega	Roberto Pellegatta	Stud Las Canarias	Haras Firmamento	Dirt	Hipódromo Argentino de Palermo	1:58.95	Neck	
2015	Quiz Kid	3	Juan Carlos Noriega	Juan Sebastián Maldotti	Stud Dark Horse	Haras Santa Maria de Araras	Turf	Hipódromo de San Isidro	2:02.13	12 lengths	
2014	Tantos Años	3	Gustavo E. Calvente	Roberto Pellegatta	Stud Arcángel	Haras Don Arcángel	Dirt	Hipódromo Argentino de Palermo	1:59.49	2 1/2 lengths	
2013	Taifas	5	Eduardo Ortega Pavón	Alfredo F. Gaitán Dassié	Stud Las Hormigas	Haras Comalal & Est. de Montas La Mission	Turf	Hipódromo de San Isidro	1:57.82	3/4 length	
2012	Expressive Halo	4	Pablo Gustavo Falero	Carlos A. Meza Brunel	Stud Axel	Haras Abolengo	Dirt	Hipódromo Argentino de Palermo	1:59.41	6 lengths	
2011	Star Runner	3	José Ricardo Méndez	Ernesto Eusebio Romero	Stud EL Zonda	Haras La Quebrada	Turf	Hipódromo de San Isidro	2:04.74	1 1/2 lengths	
2010	Lingote de Oro	4	José Ricardo Méndez	Ernesto Eusebio Romero	Keyser Soze	Haras La Providencia	Dirt	Hipódromo Argentino de Palermo	2:00.89	1 1/2 lengths	
2009	City Banker	3	Adrián M. Giannetti	Carlos D. Etchechoury	Stud El Gusy	Haras Santa Maria de Araras	Turf	Hipódromo de San Isidro	1:57.92	2 lengths	
2008	Flag Copado	4	Gustavo E. Calvente	Roberto Pellegatta	Stud Bingo Horse	Haras La Madrugada	Dirt	Hipódromo Argentino de Palermo	1:57.95	9 lengths	
2007	Fairy Magic	3	Juan Carlos Noriega	Hugo Fantino Costantino	Stud Las Hormigas	Haras La Quebrada	Turf	Hipódromo de San Isidro	1:58.64	3/4 length	
2006	Mooner	4	Mario Luis Leyes	Juan Bautista Udaondo	Stud El Bobo	Haras Las Dos Manos	Dirt	Hipódromo Argentino de Palermo	2:00.89	Head	
2005	Latency	3	Jacinto R. Herrera	Juan Bautista Udaondo	Haras Las Dos Manos	Haras Las Dos Manos	Turf	Hipódromo de San Isidro	1:59.49	1 length	
2004	Contante	3	Jacinto R. Herrera	Santillán G. Frenkel	Stud Doña Pancha	Haras Abolengo	Dirt	Hipódromo Argentino de Palermo	2:02.54	14 lengths	
2003	Manpower	3	Juan Carlos Noriega	Roberto Pellegatta	Stud Doña Ana	Haras La Quebrada	Turf	Hipódromo de San Isidro	2:03.75	7 lengths	
2002	Oh Take	3	Julio César Méndez	José Martins Alves	N. Bunker Hunt	Haras La Providencia	Dirt	Hipódromo Argentino de Palermo	2:04.47	2 1/2 lengths	
2001	Mr. Mat	3	Juan José Paulé	Ernesto Eusebio Romero	Stud Leo	Haras Firmamento	Turf	Hipódromo de San Isidro	2:00.12	1 1/2 lengths	
2000	Sei Mi	3	Horacio E. Karamanos	José Luis Palacios	Stud Mirko	Haras Las Dos Manos	Dirt	Hipódromo Argentino de Palermo	2:02.76	2 lengths	
1999	Refinado Tom	5	Jorge Valdivieso	Roberto M. Bullrich	Haras La Biznaga	Haras La Biznaga	Turf	Hipódromo de San Isidro	1:57.78	2 1/2 lengths	
1998	El Compinche	6	Jacinto R. Herrera	Juan Carlos Etchechoury	Haras La Quebrada	Haras La Quebrada	Dirt	Hipódromo Argentino de Palermo	2:01.28	5 lengths	
1997	Rincón Fraile	4	Walter Hugo Serrudo	Eduardo Oscar Ferro	Haras Rincón de Luna	Haras Rincón de Luna	Dirt	Hipódromo Argentino de Palermo	2:02.27	2 lengths	
1996	El Compinche	4	Jacinto R. Herrera	Juan Carlos Etchechoury	Haras La Quebrada	Haras La Quebrada	Dirt	Hipódromo Argentino de Palermo	2:01.44	1/2 neck	
1995	El Florista	4	Juan José Paulé	Eduardo M. Martínez de Hoz	Stud J.S.A.	Haras de la Pomme	Dirt	Hipódromo Argentino de Palermo	2:00.07	Neck	
1994	Protridoon	4	Rubén Emilio Laitán	Juan Carlos Maldotti	Stud Tori	Haras La Madrugada	Turf	Hipódromo de San Isidro	1:59.6	8 lengths	
1993	Bullicioso In	4	Rubén Emilio Laitán	Vilmar Sanguinetti	Stud Patria Grande	Haras Firmamento	Turf	Hipódromo de San Isidro	1:59.2	1 1/2 lengths	
1992	Potrillón	3	Pablo Gustavo Falero	Alberto J. Maldotti	Stud Tori	Haras La Madrugada	Turf	Hipódromo de San Isidro	2:01.2	4 lengths	
