= Husson (horse) =

Argentinian-bred Thoroughbred racehorse

- Sire: Hussonet (USA)
- Grandsire: Mr. Prospector (USA)
- Dam: Villa Elisa (CHI)
- Damsire: Roy (USA)
- Sex: Stallion
- Foaled: 29 July 2003
- Country: Argentina
- Colour: Chestnut
- Breeder: Haras Firmamento
- Owner: Gladiador (LP); Cal Ramon (SI)
- Trainer: Roberto Pellegatta
- Record: 5: 5-0-0
- Earnings: Arg$256,720

Major wins
- Gran Premio Raúl y Raúl E. Chevallier (2006) Gran Criterium (2006); Gran Premio Benito Villanueva (2007) Gran Premio de Las Américas (2007)

Awards
- Argentine Champion Two-Year-Old Male (2006); Argentine Champion Miler (2007)

Husson is a champion Argentine racehorse, who was undefeated in five starts and was the Argentine 2006 Champion Two-Year-Old and 2007 Champion Miler.

== Background ==
Husson was bred by Haras Firmamento, champion breeder in Argentina in 2000, 2002, 2003, and multiple years after. Husson's sire Hussonet stood in Chile and led the sire list there from 2000 to 2006 before transferring to Australia in 2003. Husson's dam, Villa Elisa, was a three-time winner who would go on to produce six winners including Husson.

Husson is a chestnut horse with a stripe and stands 16.0 hands high.

== Racing career ==
Husson debuted on March 10, 2006, in the Especial Parfait Amour, a 1200-meter maiden race on the dirt, at Hipódromo Argentino de Palermo, and won the race by eight lengths. His next race was the then first Group I race for two-year-olds in Argentina, the Gran Premio Raúl y Raúl E. Chevalier, a 1400-meter turf race at Hipódromo de San Isidro. He won the race impressively, with a margin of nine lengths in a time of 1:18.98, setting a new track record in one of the fastest times for the distance in the world. Husson's final race at age two was in the Group I Gran Criterium over 1600 meters, also at Hipódromo de San Isidro. Husson won by three-quarters of a length over Asiatic Boy, who would go on to win the G2 UAE Derby.

For these wins, Husson was awarded as the Champion Two-Year-Old Male in Argentina for 2006.

Husson then fractured his right knee, keeping him out of training for nearly a year. No other horse of the same generation was particularly impressive during that time, leaving many to suspect that had he been in good health, Husson would have won many of the premier races.

Husson returned to racing in the G2 Gran Premio Benito Villanueva, a 1600-meter dirt race. He closed to win the race by a head, despite tiring near the end. In his final race, Husson won the G1 Gran Premio de Las Américas, another 1600 meter dirt race, by a length and a half. These two victories were enough to earn Husson the title of Argentine 2007 Champion Miler.

== Racing statistics ==
Date	Age	Distance	Surface	Race	Grade	Track	Odds	Field	Finish	Time	Winning (Losing) margin	Jockey	Ref
Mar 10, 2006	2	1200 meters	Dirt	Parfait Amour (E)	Maiden	Hipódromo Argentino de Palermo	2.40*	8	1	1:09.59	8 lengths	Gustavo Emiliano Calvente	
Apr 9, 2006	2	1400 meters	Turf	Gran Premio Raúl y Raúl E. Chevalier	I	Hipódromo de San Isidro	2.30*	7	1	1:18.98	9 lengths	Gustavo Emiliano Calvente	
May 20, 2006	2	1600 meters	Turf	Gran Criterium	I	Hipódromo de San Isidro	1.25*	6	1	1:32.88	3/4 lengths	Gustavo Emiliano Calvente	
Apr 9, 2007	3	1600 meters	Dirt	Gran Premio Benito Villanueva	II	Hipódromo Argentino de Palermo	1.80*	6	1	1:33.48	Head	Gustavo Emiliano Calvente	
May 1, 2007	3	1600 meters	Dirt	Gran Premio de Las Américas	I	Hipódromo Argentino de Palermo	2.55*	11	1	1:33.97	1 1/2 lengths	Gustavo Emiliano Calvente	

An asterisk after the odds means Husson was the post time favorite.

== Stud career ==
Husson was retired in 2007 and stood one season at Haras La Mission in Argentina. He was purchased by Nathan Tinkler in 2008, and was moved to Patinack Farm in Australia for the 2008 breeding season and has stayed in that country since. When Patinack Farm dispersed in 2013, Husson was acquired by Vinery Stud. In 2017, Aquis Farm acquired Husson, and he currently stands at stud there. Husson's stud fee peaked in 2009 at AU$24,200.

Husson's progeny have earned over AU$36 million and he has sired 18 stakes winners as of 2022.

Husson is the sire of Lucky Hussler, winner of the Group I Brown Baldwin William Reid Stakes and Group I David Jones Nbcf Toorak Handicap. Lucky Hussler is Husson's only Group I winner.

== Pedigree ==
Pedigree of Husson (ARG), chestnut stallion, foaled July 29, 2003
Sire Hussonet (USA)	Mr. Prospector (USA)	Raise a Native (USA)	Native Dancer (USA)
Sire Hussonet (USA)	Mr. Prospector (USA)	Raise a Native (USA)	Raise You (USA)
Sire Hussonet (USA)	Mr. Prospector (USA)	Gold Digger (USA)	Nashua (USA)
Sire Hussonet (USA)	Mr. Prospector (USA)	Gold Digger (USA)	Sequence (USA)
Sire Hussonet (USA)	Sacahuista (USA)	Raja Baba (USA)	Bold Ruler (USA)
Sire Hussonet (USA)	Sacahuista (USA)	Raja Baba (USA)	Missy Baba (USA)
Sire Hussonet (USA)	Sacahuista (USA)	Nalee's Flying Flag (USA)	Hoist The Flag (USA)
Sire Hussonet (USA)	Sacahuista (USA)	Nalee's Flying Flag (USA)	Nalee (USA)
Dam Villa Elisa (CHI)	Roy (USA)	Fappiano (USA)	Mr. Prospector (USA)
Dam Villa Elisa (CHI)	Roy (USA)	Fappiano (USA)	Killaloe (USA)
Dam Villa Elisa (CHI)	Roy (USA)	Adlibber (USA)	Never Bend (USA)
Dam Villa Elisa (CHI)	Roy (USA)	Adlibber (USA)	Ivy Hackett (USA)
Dam Villa Elisa (CHI)	Weekend Dancer (ARG)	Masqued Dancer (USA)	Nijinsky (CAN)
Dam Villa Elisa (CHI)	Weekend Dancer (ARG)	Masqued Dancer (USA)	Bonnie Google (USA)
Dam Villa Elisa (CHI)	Weekend Dancer (ARG)	Domingada (ARG)	Good Time (ARG)
Dam Villa Elisa (CHI)	Weekend Dancer (ARG)	Domingada (ARG)	Endomingada (ARG)

Husson is inbred 2S × 4D to Mr. Prospector, meaning Mr. Prospector appears in the second generation on the sire's side and the fourth generation dam's side of the pedigree. Husson is also inbred to Gold Digger 3S × 5D, Raise a Native 3S × 5D, Nashua 4S x 5S, and Nasrullah 5S x 5S x 5D.
