= Haras La Quebrada =

Racehorse stud farm in Argentina

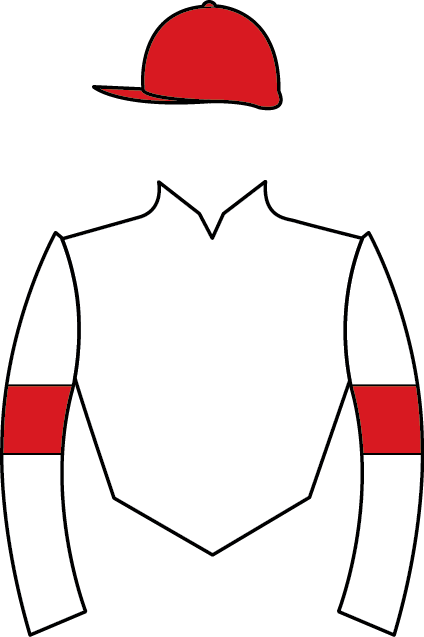
- Racing silks of Haras La Quebrada
- Company type: Horse breeding farm and Thoroughbred racing stable
- Industry: Thoroughbred horse racing
- Founded: 1945
- Defunct: 2022
- Fate: Liquidated

Haras La Quebrada (1945–2022) was a Thoroughbred racehorse breeding and training farm in Argentina.

== History ==
Haras La Quebrada was founded by Hernán Ceriani Cernadas in 1945. The name was inspired by his son, Hernán Rodolfo Ceriani Cernadas, when at the age of twelve, he fell off a polo horse and was severely injured, including a broken jawbone and nose. The new farm was named in honor of the accident.

Hernán Ceriani I first went to the races in 1909 and fell in love with the spot. He started his first stable, Stud Pur Sang, in 1913 before acquiring the 20 hectares of Salvador María del Carril's estancia in Paso del Rey to start breeding at what would become Haras La Quebrada. Two mares and the stallion Malney, by Tresiete, were purchased.

In 1947, Hernán Ceriani purchased a new property in Pilar that was either 400 or 500 hectacres. The stallion Moslem was purchased, and at Haras La Quebrada sired Petare, who would go on to win thirty-five times, racing in Argentina, Venezuela, and the United States.

In 1953, Hernán Ceriani I revolutionized the Argentine breeding industry when he imported the American-bred stallion Make Tracks. Argentine racing and breeding was heavily based on Europe, with previously imported stallions coming from England or France. Make Tracks, bred by King Ranch and sired by Eight Thirty, is believed to be the first American-bred stallion imported into Argentina, although he raced in England, running third in the 1951 King's Stand Stakes. Make Tracks's first crop included Appleton, who set a record at Hipódomo de San Isidro for 2000 meters, and his daughters would become the foundation of Haras La Quebrada.

In 1958, Hernán Ceriani II started to take up a role in technical direction of Haras La Quebrada, which he continued to do until 1969. In the 1960s, the American-bred stallion Solazo was imported.

By 1972, the year Make Tracks died, there were 80 broodmares in Haras La Qubrada.

Hernán Ceriani I died at the age of 64 in 1973. With the support of his mother, Sara Roccatgliata, who had supported the farm from its inception, and his sister, Sara Ceriani Cernadas de Ferrer Reyes, Hernán Ceriani II fully took over the farm.

Haras La Quebrada first headed the breeder statistics in Argentina in 1976, which they would achieve sixteen more times.

In the late 1970s, two more notable stallions were brought to Haras La Quebrada: Logical and Salt Marsh. Sired by Buckpasser out of the mare Smart Deb, Logical had won the Assault Handicap in his native United States. He was imported in 1977 and would end up leading the Argentine broodmare sire list regularly throughout the 1990s.

In 1989, 300 hectacres were purchased in Santa Fe to create Villa Cañás, where weanlings were kept for a year before returning to the main farm in Pilar for training and sales preparation.

In the 1980s, Hernán Ceriani II was one of the founders of FEAR and the Carreras de las Estrellas.

Hernán Ceriani II visited Santa Anita Park in the United States in 1987, where he saw Southern Halo, owned by Stavros Niarchos. He was impressed by the horse, but found the price inaccessible. Later, Southern Halo suffered a severe injury to his left front tendons, and Hernán Ceriani was then able to purchase him and have him exported to Argentina in 1987. Southern Halo became an extraordinaryily successful sire, siring 173 stakes winners and leading the Argentine sire list ten times and the Argentine broodmare sire list every year from 2004 to 2019. Hernán Ceriani II sold Southern Halo back to the United States in 1993, but continued to lease him every year for the Southern hemisphere breeding season.

Hernán Ceriani Cernadas II died in 2007 on January 17. Hernán Ceriani Cernadas III took over the farm at that point, with the assistance of his mother Inés Olaviaga and sister María Inés.

In the early 2000s, Haras La Quebrada had 200 broodmares on the farm and hosted about 300 others brought to be covered by the farm's stallions, producing about 160 foals. A few of the fillies were retained every year, and the remaining foals being sold across a few annual auctions. A team of 30 veterinarians was employed.

In 2017, Hernán Cerniani II and María Inés downsized the operation of Haras La Quebrada, restructuring the operation. 202 mares were sold without reserve in May. The Luhuk mare Dolce Diva, in foal to Endorsement, was the sale topper, selling for Ar$1,900,000 (US$118,750).

In 2022, Haras La Quebrada was fully liquidated and the farm's remaining 32 mares were sold.

Haras La Quebrada employed the jockey Jacinto Herrera and the trainers Juan Carlos Etchechoury and Carlos Zarlengo. Haras La Quebrada served as the Argentine headquarters of Stud RDI.

== Notable horses ==
Haras La Quebrada bred the winners of 279 group stakes, including 194 Group 1 races. In Argentina, they have bred 93 individual Group 1 winners.

=== Stallions ===
- Make Tracks – Leading broodmare sire in Argentina in 1974, 1976, and 1979–1981
- Solazo – Notable sire in Argentina
- Logical – Leading broodmare sire in Argentina in 1994–1996 and 1998
- Salt Marsh – Broodmare sire of 38 stakes winners, including Early Gray, Spiny, and Cadeaux
- Southern Halo – Leading sire in Argentina 1992, 1994–2001, 2003, and 2007; leading broodmare sire in Argentina 2004–2019
- Mutakddim – Leading sire in Argentina in 2006
- Calidoscopio – Winner of the Breeders' Cup Marathon

=== As a breeder ===
- Make Money (1961) – 1965 Argentine Champion Sprinter, winner of the 1965 Gran Premio Maipú and Gran Premio Hipódromo Argentino de Palermo
- Jungle Duchess (1968) – Winner of the 1971 Gran Premio Selección, Gran Premio Saturnino J. Unzué, and Gran Premio Jorge de Atucha
- Tropical Sun (1968) – Winner of the 1971 Polla de Potrillos, Gran Premio Santiago Luro, Gran Premio Raúl y Raúl E. Chevalier, and Gran Premio Montevideo
- Clear Sun (1969) – Winner of the 1974 Grande Prêmio Major Suckow, Grande Prêmio Velocidad, and Grande Prêmio ABCPCC
- Solyluz (1973) – Winner of the 1978 Gran Premio Ciudad de Buenos Aires, Gran Premio Ciudad de la Plata, Grande Prêmio ABCPCC, and Grande Prêmio Major Suckow
- Pariguana (1974) – 1979 Argentine Champion Sprinter, winner of the 1977 Clásico Saturnino J. Unzué, 1978 Gran Premio Maipu, 1979 Gran Premio Ciudad de Buenos Aires, etc.
- Malaga (1978) – 1981 Argentine Champion Three-Year-Old Female, winner of the 1981 Polla de Potrancas and Gran Premio Copa de Plata
- Fort de France (1979) – 1982 Argentine Champion Two-Year-Old Male and Three-Year-Old Male, winner of the 1982 Gran Premio Jockey Club, Gran Premio Raúl y Raúl E. Chevalier, and Gran Premio Montevideo
- Mustard (1980) – 1983 Argentine Mare of the Year and Champion Three-Year-Old Female, winner of the 1983 Polla de Potrancas
- Just in Case (1981) – 1984 Argentine Champion Miler, winner of the 1984 Polla de Potrillos and Gran Premio Hipódromo Argentino de Palermo
- Newmarket (1982) – Winner of the 1986 Gran Premio Miguel Alfredo de Martínez de Hoz and Gran Premio 25 de Mayo and 1988 Gran Premio Comparación
- Sumatra (1982) – Winner of the 1986 and 1987 Gran Premio Maipu
- Fontana (1983) – 1986 Argentine Champion Two-Year-Old Female, winner of the 1986 Gran Premio Eliseo Ramírez and Gran Premio Consagración de Potrancas
- Larabee (1983) – 1987 Argentine Horse of the Year and Champion Stayer, winner of the 1987 Gran Premio Carlos Pellegrini, Gran Premio de Honor, and Gran Premio Copa de Oro, 1989 Gran Premio Comparación and Gran Premio República Argentina
- Spiny (1985) – Winner of the 1989 Gran Premio Ciudad de Buenos Aires, 1989 and 1990 Gran Premio Suipacha, and 1990 and 1991 Gran Premio Maipu
- Oceanside (1987) – 1990 Argentine Champion Miler, winner of the 1990 Polla de Potrillos and 1991 Gran Premio Hipódromo Argentino de Palermo
- Fontemar (1988) – Winner of the 1991 Gran Premio de Potrancas, Polla de Potrancas, and Gran Premio Enrique Acebal
- La Francesa (1988) – 1991 Argentine Champion Three-Year-Old Filly, winner of the 1991 Gran Premio Selección and 1992 Gran Premio La Mission and Gran Premio Copa de Plata
- Orca (1989) – Winner of the 1992 Polla de Potrancas and Mil Guineas
- Cadeaux (1991) – 1994 Argentine Champion Two-Year-Old Filly, winner of the 1994 Gran Premio Saturnino J. Unzué and Gran Premio Jorge de Atucha
- El Compinche (1991) – 1997 Argentine Champion Miler, 1998 Argentine Champion Older Male, winner of the 1996 and 1998 Gran Premio Estrellas Classic, 1996 and 1997 Gran Premio Hipódromo Argentino de Palermo, and 1998 Gran Premio de las Américas and Gran Premio General San Martín
- Wally (1991) – 1996 Argentine Champion Female Sprinter, winner of the 1995, 1996, and 1997 Gran Premio Estrellas Sprint, 1995 and 1996 Gran Premio Suipacha, 1995 Gran Premio Ciudad de Buenos Aires, 1995 Gran Premio Feliz Alzaga de Unzué, etc.
- New Heaven (1994) – 1999 Argentine Champion Female Sprinter, winner of the 1999 Gran Premio Suipacha and Gran Premio Maipu
- Chevillard (1995) – Winner of the 1998 Polla de Potrillos and Gran Premio Dardo Rocha
- Final Meeting (1995) – 1998 Argentine Champion Male Sprinter, winner of the 1998 Gran Premio Suipacha, Gran Premio Maipu, and Gran Premio Felix de Alzaga de Unzué, and 1999 Gran Premio Ciudad de Buenos Aires
- Team (1995) – 1998 Argentine Horse of the Year and Champion Two-Year-Old Male, winner of the 1998 Gran Premio Santiago Luro, Gran Premio Montevideo, and Gran Premio Estrellas Juvenile
- La Galerie (1996) – 1999 Argentine Champion Two-Year-Old Filly, winner of the 1999 Gran Premio Saturnino J. Unzué
- Guernika (1997) – 2001 Argentine Champion Older Female, winner of the 2000 Mil Guineas and Polla de Potrancas and 2001 Gran Premio Estrellas Distaff and Gran Premio Hipódromo Argentino de Palermo
- Miss Linda (1997) – 2000 Argentine Mare of the Year and Champion Three-Year-Old Female, winner of the 2000 Gran Premio Selección and Gran Premio Enrique Acebal and 2001 Spinster Stakes
- Serenita (1997) – 2000 Argentine Champion Two-Year-Old Female, winner of the Gran Premio Saturnino J. Unzué
- Medal of Honor (2000) – 2004 Argentine Champion Male Sprinter, winner of the 2004 Gran Premio Maipu and Gran Premio Felix de Alzaga Unzué
- Mr. Nancho (2000) – 2003 Argentine Champion Miler, winner of the 2003 Gran Premio Hipódromo Argentino de Palermo
- El Garufa (2002) – Winner of the 2008 and 2009 Gran Premio Hipódromo Argentino de Palermo and 2009 and 2010 Gran Premio de Las Américas, and 2010 Gran Premio Estrellas Mile
- Calidoscopio (2003) – Winner of the 2009 Gran Premio República Argentina, 2012 Breeders' Cup Marathon, 2013 Brooklyn Handicap, etc.
- Fairy Magic (2003) – Winner of the 2007 Gran Premio Estrellas Classic and Gran Premio Hipódromo Argentino de Palermo and 2008 Gran Premio de Las Américas
- Muller (2003) – Winner of the Peruvian Triple Crown (2006)
- San Livinus (2006) – 2009 Argentine Champion Two-Year-Old Male, winner of the 2009 Gran Premio Etrellas Juvenile
- Elogiado (2013) – 2018 Argentine Champion Male Sprinter, winner of the 2018 Gran Premio Felix de Alzaga Unzué, 2019 Gran Premio Ciudad de Buenos Aires, and 2018 and 2019 Gran Premio Estrellas Sprint

== Awards ==
Haras La Quebrada won the Distinciones Pellegrini award for Argentine Breeder of the Year in 1983, 1986–1988, 1990, 1991–1994, 1996, 1998, and 2007 and the Argentine Owner of the Year in 1984, 1989, 1991, 1993, and 1994. Haras La Quebrada won the Pellegrini del Año in 1987.

Haras La Quebrada led the Argentine breeders statistics list sixteen times, also finishing second ten times and third three times.

With 9 wins, Haras La Quebrada is the leading owner of the Carreras de Las Estrellas, and with 31 wins, is also the leading breeder.
