= Tresiete =

Argentine thoroughbred racehorse

- Sire: Alan Breck
- Grandsire: Sunstar
- Dam: Trentona
- Damsire: Torpoint
- Sex: Stallion
- Foaled: 7 October 1926
- Country: Argentina
- Colour: Chestnut
- Breeder: Haras Lonquimay
- Owner: Caballeriza Pobre
- Record: 7: 4-1-2
- Earnings: m$n90,617

Major wins
- Polla de Potrillos (1929) Gran Premio Montevideo (1929) Premio Saavedra (1929)

Awards
- Argentine Champion Three-Year-Old (1929) Leading Sire in Argentina (1938, 1942)

Tresiete (7 October 1926–1945?) was an Argentine-bred thoroughbred racehorse and leading sire in Argentina.

== Racing career ==
Tresiete raced exclusively in the year 1929, running seven times for four wins, including the Gran Premio Montevideo, Premio Saavedra, and Gran Premio Polla de Potrillos. He ran second in the Gran Premio Jockey Club and third in the Gran Premio Nacional. Tresiete was the Argentine Champion Three-Year-Old of his generation.

== Stud career ==
Tresiete stood at stud at Haras Lonquimay, where he was bred.

Tresiete led the Argentine General Sire List in 1938 and 1942. He was second in 1937 and 1941 and was among the leading sires 7 times.

=== Notable progeny ===
- Bubalcó, winner of the Gran Premio Carlos Pellegrini, Gran Premio Nacional, Gran Premio Jockey Club, Clásico Comparación
- Balbuco, winner of the Gran Premio de Honor (twice), Gran Premio José Pedro Ramírez, Clásico Miguel Alfredo Martínez de Hoz, Clásico Saturnino J. Unzué, etc.
- Tónico, winner of the Gran Premio Carlos Pellegrini, Gran Premio de Honor, Gran Premio Jockey Club, Clásico Comparación, Clásico Miguel Alfredo Martínez de Hoz, etc.
- Sorteado, winner of the Argentine Triple Crown, Manhattan Handicap, etc.
- Rolando, winner of the Gran Premio Jockey Club, Clásico Santiago Luro, etc.
- Balbuca, winner of the Clásico Saturnino J. Unzué
- Supremo, winner of the Gran Premio Montevideo
- Partido, winner of the Clásico Raúl Chevalier

=== Notable progeny of daughters ===
- Bullanguera, winner of the Gran Premio Selección, Polla de Potrancas, etc.
- Taimado, winner of the Clásico El Ensayo
- Tolpan, winner of the Clásico El Ensayo and Clásico St. Leger
- Tatai, winner of the Clásico El Derby
- Nonchalance, winner of the Gran Premio Selección

== Pedigree ==
Pedigree of Tresiete (ARG), chestnut stallion, foaled October 7, 1926
| Sire Alan Breck (GB) 1918 | Sunstar (GB); 1908 | Sundridge (GB) | Amphion (GB) |
| Sire Alan Breck (GB) 1918 | Sunstar (GB); 1908 | Sundridge (GB) | Sierra (GB) |
| Sire Alan Breck (GB) 1918 | Sunstar (GB); 1908 | Doris (GB) | Loved One (GB) |
| Sire Alan Breck (GB) 1918 | Sunstar (GB); 1908 | Doris (GB) | Lauretta (GB) |
| Sire Alan Breck (GB) 1918 | Joie de Vivre (GB); 1908 | Gallinule (GB) | Isonomy (GB) |
| Sire Alan Breck (GB) 1918 | Joie de Vivre (GB); 1908 | Gallinule (GB) | Moorhen (GB) |
| Sire Alan Breck (GB) 1918 | Joie de Vivre (GB); 1908 | Melinda (ITY) | Melton (GB) |
| Sire Alan Breck (GB) 1918 | Joie de Vivre (GB); 1908 | Melinda (ITY) | Fame (GB) |
| Dam Trentona (GB) 1912 | Torpoint (GB); 1900 | Trenton (NZ) | Musket (GB) |
| Dam Trentona (GB) 1912 | Torpoint (GB); 1900 | Trenton (NZ) | Frailty (AUS) |
| Dam Trentona (GB) 1912 | Torpoint (GB); 1900 | Doncaster Beauty (GB) | Sheen (GB) |
| Dam Trentona (GB) 1912 | Torpoint (GB); 1900 | Doncaster Beauty (GB) | Doncaster Belle (GB) |
| Dam Trentona (GB) 1912 | Janitza (GB); 1896 | Janissary (GB) | Isonomy (GB) |
| Dam Trentona (GB) 1912 | Janitza (GB); 1896 | Janissary (GB) | Jannette (GB) |
| Dam Trentona (GB) 1912 | Janitza (GB); 1896 | Burgundy (GB) | Hermit (GB) |
| Dam Trentona (GB) 1912 | Janitza (GB); 1896 | Burgundy (GB) | Doll Tearsheet (GB) |

Treiete is inbred 4S x 4D to Isonomy, which means that Isonomy appears in the fourth generation on the dam's side and sire's side. He is also inbred 5S x 4D to Hermit.
