= Gran Premio de Las Américas =

G1 horse race in Argentina

Gran Premio de las Américas - OSAF
- Class: Group 1

Race information
- Distance: 1600 meters
- Surface: Dirt
- Track: Hipódromo Argentino de Palermo
- Qualification: Three-years-old and older
- Weight: Weight for age
- Purse: $85,200,000 ARS (2026); 1st: $40,000,000 ARS

The Gran Premio de las Américas - OSAF (also known as Gran Premio de las Américas and Gran Premio Internacional de las Américas) is a Group 1 horse race run at Hipódromo Argentino de Palermo in Buenos Aires, Argentina, open to horses three years old or older. It is run over a distance of 1600 metres (0.99 mi) on the dirt.

== History ==
The Gran Premio de las Américas has been run since at least 1977.

The Gran Premio de las Américas is generally run on May 1, along with the Group 1 Gran Premio Jorge de Atucha, Group 1 Gran Premio Montevideo, Group 1 Gran Premio Ciudad de Buenos Aires, Group 1 Gran Premio Criadores, and Group 1 Gran Premio República Argentina.

== Records since 1989 ==
Speed record:

- 1:32.32 – Storm Dynamico (2021)

Greatest winning margin:

- 8 lengths – El Compinche (1998)

Most wins:

- 2 – Iberal (2001, 2002)
- 2 – El Garufa (2009, 2010)
- 2 – Todo Un Amiguito (2013, 2015)
- 2 – El Exito (2024, 2025)

Most wins by a jockey:

- 3 – Jacinto R. Herrera (1992, 1998, 2011)
- 3 – Gustavo E. Calvente (2001, 2006, 2012)

Most wins by a trainer:

- 3 – Juan Carlos Etchechoury (1998, 2012, 2014)

Most wins by an owner:

- 2 – Haras & Stud Don Nico (2013, 2015)
- 2 – Stud Snow Crest (2009, 2010)

Most wins by a breeder:

- 5 – Haras La Quebrada (1998, 2008, 2009, 2010, 2012)
- 4 – Haras Firmamento (2007, 2014, 2022, 2026)
- 3 – Haras El Paraiso (2005, 2024, 2025)

== Winners since 1989 ==
Year	Winner	Age	Jockey	Trainer	Owner	Breeder	Time	Margin	Ref
2026	Drive Joy	3	Martín Javier Valle	Carlos D. Etchechoury	Haras Firmamento	Haras Firmamento	1:36.28	1 1/2 lengths	
2025	El Exito	4	F. Fernandes Gonçalves	José Cristóbal Blanco	Stud F. Enrique	Haras El Paraiso	1:34.60	2 lengths	
2024	El Exito	3	Martín Javier Valle	José Cristóbal Blanco	Stud F. Enrique	Haras El Paraiso	1:33.22	2 lengths	
2023	Subsanador	3	F. Fernandes Gonçalves	Nicolás Martín Ferro	Stud Facundito	Haras El Mallin	1:33.08	4 lengths	
2022	Chanta Joy	3	Rodrigo G. Blanco	Carlos D. Etchechoury	Haras Firmamento	Haras Firmamento	1:34.51	3/4 length	
2021	Storm Dynamico	4	Gonzalo Hahn	Ángel Alberto Piana	Stud La Numero 22	Haras La Yangonea	1:32.32	3 lengths	
2020	Race not run								
2019	Nacho Surge	3	Ivan E. Monasterolo	Eduardo Gaston Acoosano	Stud Marca Borrada	Carlos Alberto Cocilobo	1:32.78	4 lengths	
2018	Mateco	4	Jorge Antonio Ricardo	Pedro Omar Armada	Stud Carlomagno	Luis Humberto Aguero	1:32.98	1 1/2 lengths	
2017	Leo Ruler	4	Pable Gustavo Falero	Santillán G. Frenkel	Stud Los Ponchos	Haras Vacacion	1:33.28	3 lengths	
2016	Touareg	3	Altair Domingos	Gustavo E. Scarpello	Stud Mi Metejon	Haras Chenaut	1:32.67	1 length	
2015	Todo Un Amiguito	6	Altair Domingos	Mariano Ariel Romero	Haras & Stud Don Nico	Alberto Virgini Monayer Carlos	1:34.10	4 lengths	
2014	Music Van	4	Jorge G. Ruíz Díaz	Juan Carlos Etchechoury	Stud De Galera	Haras Firmamento	1:33.61	1 length	
2013	Todo Un Amiguito	4	Cristián F. Quiles	Ernesto Eusebio Romero	Haras & Stud Don Nico	Alberto Virgini Monayer Carlos	1:32.39	1/2 neck	
2012	Panegirico	4	Gustavo E. Calvente	Juan Carlos Etchechoury	Stud Los Juncos	Haras La Quebrada	1:34.09	6 lengths	
2011	Inter Optimist	6	Jacinto R. Herrera	Waldir Libero Zancanaro	Haras & Stud Vengador	Haras & Stud Vengador	1:36.57	1 1/2 lengths	
2010	El Garufa	7	Juan Carlos Noriega	Luis Santiago Bedoya	Stud Snow Crest	Haras La Quebrada	1:34.75	Head	
2009	El Garufa	6	Pedro Roberto Robles	Luis Santiago Bedoya	Stud Snow Crest	Haras La Quebrada	1:33.32	5 lengths	
2008	Fairy Magic	4	Horacio J. Betansos	Alfredo F. Gaitán Dassié	Stud Las Hormigas	Haras La Quebrada	1:33.59	1/2 length	
2007	Husson	3	Jorge Valdivieso	Roberto Pellegatta	Stud Cal Ramón	Haras Firmamento	1:33.97	1 1/2 lengths	
2006	Juan Talentoso	4	Gustavo E. Calvente	Carlos Alberto Zarlengo	Stud La Barraca	Haras Alborada	1:33.92	Head	
2005	Imminente	3	José Ricardo Méndez	Mario A. Catapano	Stud To-No-Go	Haras El Paraiso	1:33.81	Neck	
2004	Romeo Plus	3	Claudio F. Quiroga	Gregorio Bernardo Vivas	Stud Castañon	Haras Panamericano	1:32.99	2 1/2 lengths	
2003	Jamelao	6	Claudio F. Quiroga	Roberto Pellegatta	Stud Bingo Horse	Haras El Manzanar	1:33.16	6 lengths	
2002	Iberal	6	Pablo Damian Carrizo	Eduardo M. Martínez de Hoz	Haras Daro	Haras Daro	1:33.31	3/4 length	
2001	Iberal	5	Gustavo E. Calvente	Eduardo M. Martínez de Hoz	Stud San Pablo	Haras Daro	1:33.76	Nose	
2000	Ulisse	3	Cardenas E. Talaverano	Juan Carlos Bianchi	Haras El Turf	Haras El Turf	1:32.55	5 lengths	
1999	Di Escorpion	3	Néstor Nicolás Oviedo	Edmundo I. Rodriguez	Stud Cosa Nostra	Haras La Irenita	1:35.02	1/2 length	
1998	El Compinche	6	Jacinto R. Herrera	Juan Carlos Etchechoury	Haras La Quebrada	Haras La Quebrada	1:33.81	8 lengths	
1997	Eithan	4	Cardenas E. Talaverano	Miguel Salas Sanchez	Stud T. R.	D. Michael Cavey DVM	1:34.09	2 lengths	
1996	Fanon	3	Cornelio José Reynoso	Julio Gardel	Stud San Pascasio	Walter Scott	1:36.78	Head	
1995	Prince Boy	5	Pablo Gustavo Falero	Juan Carlos Maldotti	Stud San José del Socorro	Jorge Eugenio Tavares	1:35.84	3 lengths	
1994	Off the Record	3	Raúl Alberto Ramallo	Juan Carlos Viviani	Stud Hoy de Juego	Haras El Candil	1:33.10	3 lengths	
1993	Cleante	3	Pablo Gustavo Falero	Vilmar Sanguinetti	Stud Ferre	Haras El Malacate	1:33.84	2 1/2 lengths	
1992	Danny Jack	3	Jacinto R. Herrera		Stud Carmari	Haras Los Rubles	1:33.90	5 lengths	
1991	Lin Yutang	3	Edgardo Gramática		Stud Tañido	Haras El Candil	1:35.85		
1990	Pier Seventeen	3	Eduardo A. Liceri	Ignacio Correas	Stud Cuarto Creciente		1:34.85		
1989	Bacache	5	Miguel Ángel Sarati	Edgardo Oscar Martucci	Stud Las Canarias	Haras Vacacion	1:34.25		

== Earlier winners (incomplete) ==
- 1977: Mudali
- 1978: Antinoo
- 1979: Ahmad
- 1980: Sloppy
- 1981: Duplex
- 1982: Sir Gold
- 1983: Fat Lluvioso
- 1984: Sonrie Joge
- 1985: Louvre
- 1986: Papirri
- 1987: Mocito Feliz
