= Gran Premio Dardo Rocha =

Group 1 horse race in Argentina

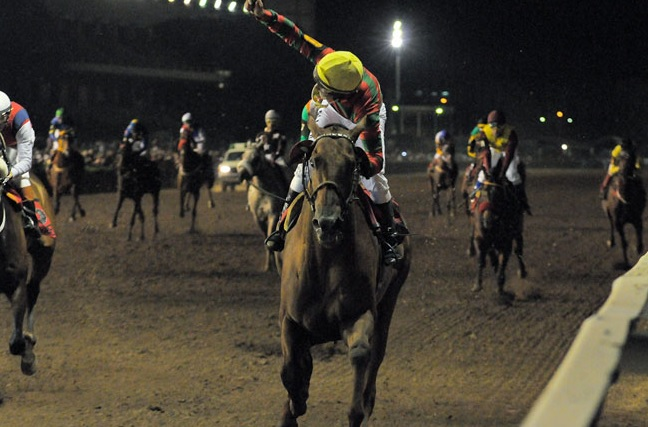
- Class: Group 1
- Location: Hipódromo de La Plata
- Inaugurated: 1915

Race information
- Distance: 2400 meters
- Surface: Dirt
- Qualification: Three years old and up
- Weight: Weight for age
- Purse: $285,000,000 ARS (2025); 1st: $150,000,000 ARS

The Gran Premio Dardo Rocha (previously known as the Gran Premio Internacional Dardo Rocha, Premio La Plata, Premio 19 de Novimebre, Clásico Cincuentenario, Clásico Ciudad Eva Perón, Clásico Fundador Dardo Rocha, and Clásico Antonio Cané) is a Group 1 thoroughbred horse race run at Hipódromo de La Plata in Argentina, open to horses three years old or older. It is currently run over a distance of 2400 metres (1.5 mi) on the dirt and is the most important race at the Hipódromo de La Plata.

== History ==
The Gran Premio Dardo Rocha was first run in 1915, and run under the name Dardo Rocha for the first time in 1918. Premio La Plata, Premio 19 de Noviembre, Clásico Cincuentenario, Clásico Fundador Dardo Rocha, Clásico Antonio Cané, and Clásico Ciudad Eva Perón were also used, until the name settled as the Gran Premio Internacional Dardo Rocha in 1960.

Through its history, the Gran Premio Dardo Rocha has been run at a variety of distances:

- 3000 meters (1935, 1965–1975, 1977–1978)
- 2400 meters (1979–present)
- 2330 meters (1916)
- 2300 meters (1919–1926, 1931–1936, 1938 1940, 1942–1964)
- 2200 meters (1917, 1937, 1939, 1941)
- 2100 meters (1918)

In 1917, Maraschino and Dieufort dead heated for first.

The Gran Premio Dardo Rocha was not run 1927–1930, 1976, and 1996.

Foreign horses that have won the race include the Uruguayan racehorses Sol de Noche II and Adyacente in 1969 and 1991, respectively, the Peruvian racehorse Maidenform in 1971, and the Brazilian racehorse Mr. Nedawi in 2010 and 2011.

El Aragonés was the first major racehorse to win the race, in 1952.

When the graded stakes system was introduced in Argentina in 1973, the race was rated a Group 1 race, a designation it has retained since.

The Gran Premio Dardo Rocha was traditionally run on November 19, the day the city of La Plata was founded by Dardo Rocha, namesake of the race, but this was changed in 2023, when the race was run on December 2. In 2024, the race returned to its usual date.

== Records ==
Speed record:

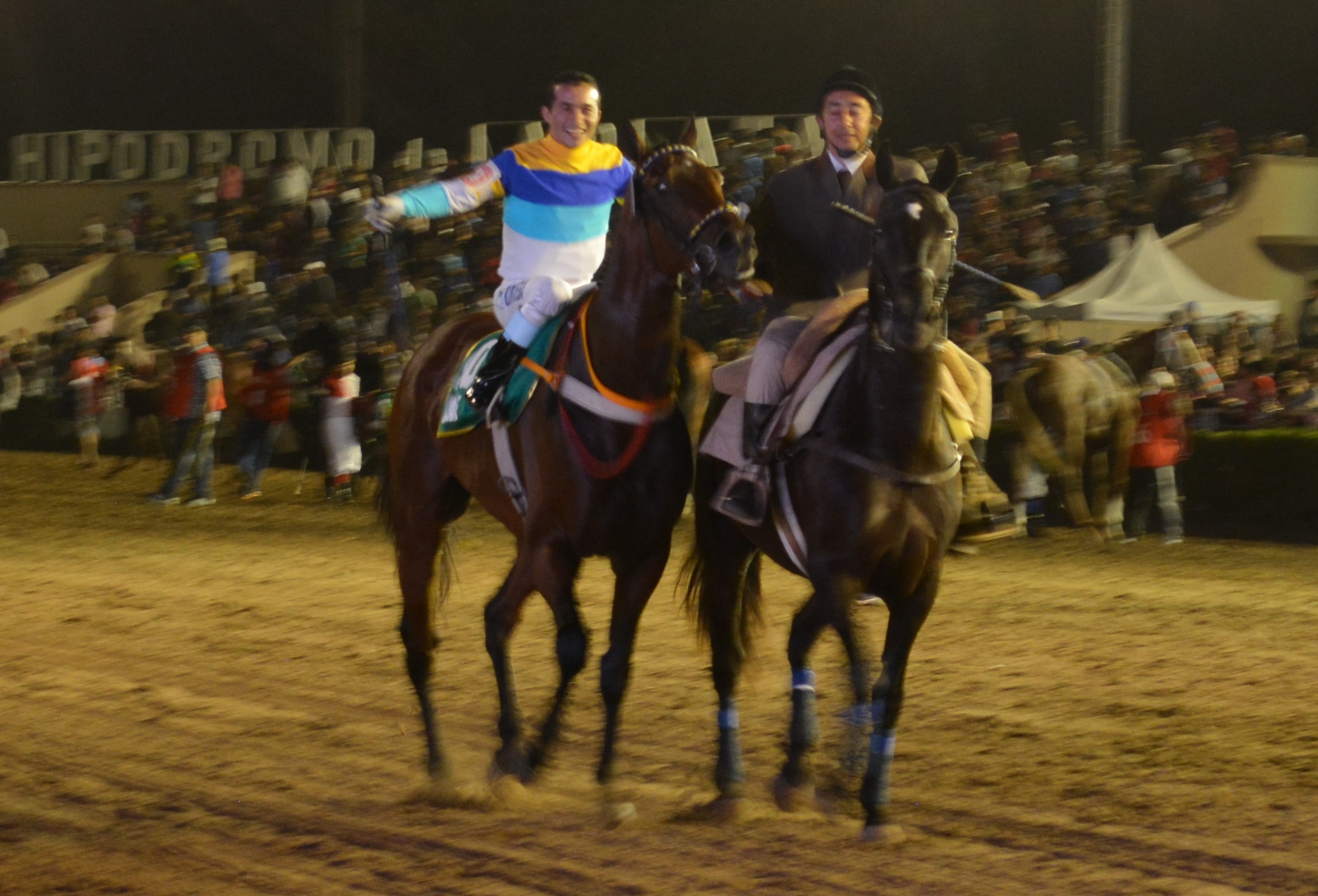
- Keane, current holder of the speed record
  2400 meters (current distance): 2:28.58 – Keane (2016)
- 3000 meters: 3:08 2/5 – Lanark (1935)
- 2330 meters: 2:26 – Prince (1916)
- 2300 meters: 2:20 – Don Succes (1942)
- 2200 meters: 2:14 4/5 – Bernabé (1937)
- 2100 meters: 2:09 4/5 – Lord Beatty (1918)

Greatest winning margin (since 1989):

- 8 lengths – Bat Ruizero (2002)

Most wins:

- 2 – Bernabé (1937, 1938)
- 2 – Mr. Nedawi (2010, 2011)

Most wins by a jockey:

- 5 – F. Fernandes Gonçalves (2014, 2020, 2021, 2022, 2024)
- 4 – Rodrigo G. Blanco (2008, 2012, 2015, 2017)
- 3 – V. Lopellegrina (1939, 1942, 1954)
- 3 – Fabián Antonio Rivero (1991, 2003 2004)
- 3 – Pablo Gustavo Falero (1997, 2009, 2019)

Most wins by a trainer:

- 5 – Antonio Derli Gómez (1984, 1985, 1986, 1988, 1989)
- 3 – J. M. Boquín (1952, 1960, 1966)
- 3 – Carlos D. Etchechoury (2008, 2015, 2025)

Most wins by an owner:

- 3 – Stud Happy End (1984, 1985, 1988)

Most wins by a breeder (since 1988):

- 2 – Haras de la Pomme (1994, 2022)
- 2 – Haras La Madrugada (1995, 2013)
- 2 – Haras El Paraíso (1997, 2007)
- 2 – Haras La Quebrada (1998, 2003)
- 2 – Haras Usasti (2005, 2012)
- 2 – Haras Old Friends (2010, 2011)
- 2 – Haras Firmamento (2020, 2021)

== Winners ==
Year	Winner	Age	Jockey	Trainer	Owner	Breeder	Distance	Time	Margin	Ref
2025	The Gladiator's Hat	5	Eduardo Ortega Pavón	Carlos D. Etchechoury	Haras El Ángel de Venecia	Haras El Ángel de Venecia	2400 m	2:30.37	7 lengths	
2024	Treasure Island	6	F. Fernandes Gonçalves	Nicólas Martín Ferro	Stud Bien de Abajo	Haras El Doguito	2400 m	2:29.93	3/4 length	
2023	Tío Boy	6	Gonzalo Damián Borda	Marcelo S. Sueldo	Stud El Ciclon	Haras Vikeda	2400 m	2:29.64	5 lengths	
2022	Miriñaque	6	F. Fernandes Gonçalves	María Cristina Muñoz	Stud Parque Patricios	Haras de la Pomme	2400 m	2:29.28	4 lengths	
2021	Zurán Zurán	4	F. Fernandes Gonçalves	Eduardo Carlos Tadei	Stud Anaxor	Haras Firmamento	2400 m	2:29.57	3/4 length	
2020	Emotion Orpen	5	F. Fernandes Gonçalves	Lucas Francisco Gaitán	Haras Firmamento	Haras Firmamento	2400 m	2:31.84	2 1/2 lengths	
2019	Sólo Un Momento	6	Pablo Gustavo Falero	Luciano Rubén Cerutti	Haras Carampangue	Haras Carampangue	2400 m	2:33.13	Neck	
2018	Alampur	4	Wilson R. Moreyra	Jorge A. Mayansky Neer	Stud Asuncion	Haras Santa Ines	2400 m	2:32.16	3/4 length	
2017	Calcolatore	4	Rodrigo G. Blanco	Juan Javier Etchechoury	Stud Oye Tango	Haras Santa Maria de Araras	2400 m	2:31.79	1 1/2 lengths	
2016	Keane	4	Eduardo Ortega Pavón	Lucas Francisco Gaitán	Haras Santa Elena	Haras La Manija	2400 m	2:28.58	2 lengths	
2015	Giant Killing	5	Rodrigo G. Blanco	Carlos D. Etchechoury	Stud Mirko	Haras La Pasion	2400 m	2:36.12	3 lengths	
2014	Idolo Porteño	4	F. Fernandes Gonçalves	Nicolás Alfredo Gaitán	Haras Cachagua	Haras La Esperanza	2400 m	2:31.74	5 lengths	
2013	Flag Nine	4	Roberto N. Alzamendi	Mario Daniel Turquieto	Haras Madrigal	Haras La Madrugada	2400 m	2:29.38	1/2 neck	
2012	Gran Enzo	5	Rodrigo G. Blanco	Daniel Alberto Bordon	Stud Los Vascos	Haras Usasti	2400 m	2:31.57	Neck	
2011	Mr. Nedawi	7	José A. Da Silva	João G. Cerdeira Da Costa	Stud Hole in One	Haras Old Friends	2400 m	2:28.90	2 lengths	
2010	Mr. Nedawi	6	Juvenal M. Da Silva	Juan José Martínez	Stud Hole in One	Haras Old Friends	2400 m	2:30.83	3 lengths	
2009	Bien Toi	4	Pablo Gustavo Falero	G. Frenkel Santillán	Haras San Francisco de Pilar	Christine Firmin Didot	2400 m	2:32.45	3/4 length	
2008	Reraise	3	Rodrigo G. Blanco	Carlos D. Etchechoury	Stud T.N.T.	Stud T.N.T.	2400 m	2:31.20	6 lengths	
2007	Ithamar	5	Miguel A. Meléndez U.	Néstor Jorge Vismara	Stud El Cimarron	Haras El Paraíso	2400 m	2:32.02	4 lengths	
2006	De Pizarra	5	Jorge Antonio Ricardo	Luciano Juan Parisi	Stud Los Nelson	José María Nelson	2400 m	2:30.07	2 1/2 lengths	
2005	Basko Pinton	4	Gustavo E. Calvente	Roberto Pellegatta	Stud F.F.C.	Haras Usasti	2400 m	2:30.02	3 lengths	
2004	Badajo	3	Fabián Antonio Rivero	Luciano Juan Parisi	Stud Los Cerrillos	Haras Vacacion	2400 m	2:30.20	Head	
2003	El Charlatan	4	Fabián Antonio Rivero	Roberto Pellegatta	Stud Gaviota de Mar	Haras La Quebrada	2400 m	2:32.25	2 lengths	
2002	Bat Ruizero	4	Jorge Valdivieso	Nahuel Orlandi	Stud Lacydon	Haras Los Cesares	2400 m	2:31.47	8 lengths	
2001	Second Reality	3	Gonzalo Hahn	Rodolfo Cariaga	Stud El Asturiano	Haras Orilla del Monte	2400 m	2:31.50	4 lengths	
2000	Campesino	3	Jacinto R. Herrera	Juan Carlos Bianchi	Stud Starlight	Haras La Colina	2400 m	2:31.18	4 lengths	
1999	Rubio First	4	Horacio J. Betansos	Ramón Eloy Jones	Stud Rubio B.	Haras Abolengo	2400 m	2:32.82	2 lengths	
1998	Chevillard	3	Néstor Nicolás Oviedo	Hector R. Pavarini	Stud Las Telas	Haras La Quebrada	2400 m	2:29.92	Head	
1997	El Berberisco	5	Pablo Gustavo Falero	Juan Carlos Maldotti	Stud Los Patrios	Haras El Paraíso	2400 m	2:31.84	5 lengths	
1996	Race not run									
1995	Potrialma ƒ	4	Juan Carlos Noriega	Juan Carlos Maldotti	Stud Tori	Haras La Madrugada	2400 m	2:31.39	1 length	
1994	El Florista	4	Juan José Paulé	Eduardo M. Martínez De Hoz	Stud J.S.A.	Haras de la Pomme	2400 m	2:32.37	3 lengths	
1993	Nativo del Sur	5	Horacio J. Betansos	Anibal J. Giovanetti	Stud Tramo 20	Haras Rosa Do Sul	2400 m	2:33.31	1/2 neck	
1992	Franco Boy	4	Miguel Ángel Sarati	Ernesto Eusebio Romero	Stud El Galo	Haras El Rincón	2400 m	2:32.31		
1991	Adyacente	4	Fabián Antonio Rivero	Jorge D. Marsiglia Aguete	Stud Alfa	Haras El Arbolito	2400 m	2:36.72	1 length	
1990	Arrayan	4	Candelario Caceres	Sixto A. Soto	Stud San Blas		2400 m	2:32.02	1/2 length	
1989	Magnificente	4	Daniel Jorge Ojeda	Antonio Derli Gómez	Stud La Rosaura		2400 m	2:30.40	3 lengths	
1988	Egineso	3	L. A. Triviño	Antonio Derli Gómez	Stud Happy End		2400 m	2:30.83		
1987	Repingo	3	M. A. Garcia	I. L. San Millan	Stud Don Pila		2400 m	2:29.93		
1986	Micenas ƒ	4	L. A. Triviño	Antonio Derli Gómez	Stud Aguarenas		2400 m	2:34 2/5		
1985	Salvate Tel	4	J. A. Maciel	Antonio Derli Gómez	Stud Happy End	Haras Rincón Del Pino	2400 m	2:36 1/5		
1984	Nice Ilusion	3	J. A. Maciel	Antonio Derli Gómez	Stud Happy End		2400 m	2:31		
1983	Mazorquero Red	3	M. A. Sarati	M. Gervasoni	Stud A.R.C.		2400 m	2:34 2/5		
1982	Tan Cerezo	4	C. Cáceres	H. L. Luraschi	Stud Pica	Haras La Florida	2400 m	2:33 4/5		
1981	Cinco Mars	4	J. A. Bretón	J. O. Penna	Stud Los Candiles		2400 m	2:33 2/5		
1980	Ruizero	3	M. A. Sarati	M. G. Gervasoni	Haras Don Yeye	Haras Don Yeye	2400 m	2:34 4/5		
1979	Forlano	3	V. R. Centeno	C. A. Ferro	Stud La Gran Huella	Haras San Javier	2400 m	2:33 4/5		
1978	Vacilante	4	C. Cáceres	J. E. Bianchi	Stud R.L.L.	Haras La Biznaga	3000 m	3:14 2/5		
1977	Mister Brea	3	C. A. Pezoa	E. L. Clerc	Stud Buenventura	Haras Dreanina	3000 m	3:16 1/5		
1976	Race not run									
1975	Frari	5	V. R. Centeno	L. A. Ferro	Haras Ojo de Agua	Haras Ojo de Agua	3000 m	3:15		
1974	Good Bloke	4	J. Torres	A. L. Salvati	Haras Don Yayo	Haras Don Yayo	3000 m	3:13 3/5		
1973	Iram	3	O. A. Cosenza	A. V. Giovanetti	Stud Lombardo	Haras Argentino	3000 m	3:13 3/5		
1972	Helda ƒ	3	N. J. Palavecino	J. R. Grimaut	Stud Los Padres	Haras Los Prados	3000 m	3:18 2/5		
1971	Maidenform ƒ	4	A. Gonzalez	Sabino Arias	Stud Emilito	Haras Santana	3000 m	3:15 1/5		
1970	Farm ƒ	4	J. Camoretti	A. J. Giovanetti	Stud Palermmo	Haras Argentino	3000 m	3:16		
1969	Sol de Noche II	3	O. R. Dominguez	J. M. Ferro	Stud Wyoming A.R.	Haras Uruguay	3000 m	3:13 1/5		
1968	Dart ƒ	3	E. Riso	A. L. Garrido	Stud Upper Cut		3000 m	3:09 4/5		
1967	Ribereño	3	J. Torres Benitez	A. L. Salvati	Stud Sunar	Haras Chapadmalal	3000 m	3:13 3/5		
1966	Eurreko	3	C. Montenegro	J. M. Boquín	Stud Cabalístico		3000 m	3:13 2/5		
1965	Handon	4	C. S. Sauro	A. A. A. Jacoby	Stud M.A.D.C.		3000 m	3:10 2/5		
1964	Tagliamento	3	C. Abril	C. A. Mucklow	Stud El Chenque	Haras Upper Cut	2300 m	2:26		
1963	Niarkos	3	J. M. Caballero	F. D. Vitale	Carlos Tomás	Haras de la Pomme	2300 m	2:27 2/5		
1962	Andino	4	A. T. Mucklow	A. Bonetto	Stud Los Plátanos	Haras La Horquetas	2300 m	2:25 3/5		
1961	Alsina	3	A. Sanchez Caceda	P. C. Sosa	Stud Nunca	Haras La Florida	2300 m	2:26 3/5		
1960	Chusca ƒ	4	H. J. Boquín	J. M. Boquín	Stud El Rosal	Haras El Puntano	2300 m	2:25		
1959	Don Poggio	3	S. L. Di Tomaso	A. A. Lacelli	Stud La Vasquita	Haras Martin Fierro	2300 m	2:22 4/5		
1958	Poderoso	4	C. S. Sauro	A. de Los Santos	Stud Dosa	Haras Maryland	2300 m	2:23 2/5		
1957	Solito	4	J. Ortiz Tapia	R. L. Valdéz	Stud La Nena	Haras El Bagual	2300 m	2:23 4/5		
1956	¡Huly! ƒ	3	H. A. Ponzi	T. Giovenille	Stud Mana Mora		2300 m	2:23 2/5		
1955	Dahir	5	H. C. A. Padula	E. M. Acevedo	Stud Tesi		2300 m	2:23 2/5		
1954	Beti Alaj ƒ	3	V. Lopellegrina	A. M. Quienteros	Stud Oral		2300 m	2:23		
1953	Helenico	3	O. O. Bartucci	O. J. Garrido	Stud La Tranquera		2300 m	2:22 1/5		
1952	El Aragonés	3	Irineo Leguizamo	J. M. Boquín	Stud La Forja	Haras Miryam	2300 m	2:22 2/5		
1951	Sandalia ƒ	3	H. C. A. Padula	P. E. Alvarez	Stud Luján de Cuyo		2300 m	2:21		
1950	Ney	3	J. E. Vidarte	I. A. Rolón	Stud Las Lomas		2300 m	2:25		
1949	Nome	3	J. Araya	D. Torterolo	Haras de la Pomme		2300 m	2:24 4/5		
1948	Baradero	3	L. P. F. Canu	L. Saccone	Stud Santo Domingo		2300 m	2:24		
1947	Balan	3	J. P. Artigas	A. Grassi	Stud Oirán	Haras El Pelado	2300 m	2:21 1/5		
1946	Baleador	5	M. A. Bergos	O. J. Garrido	Stud Farolcito		2300 m	2:22		
1945	Mon Prince	4	R. D. Recavarren	T. Tedeschi	Stud El Grillo		2300 m	2:24		
1944	Mija ƒ	4	J. Sbema	B. Vieytes	Stud Tatita		2300 m	2:21 1/5		
1943	Certero	5	P. F. Falcón	M. Fernandez	Stud Santa Paula		2300 m	2:20 1/5		
1942	Don Succes	5	V. Lopellegrina	H. Petit	Stud Gitano		2300 m	2:20		
1941	Miss Turpin ƒ	5	R. Rodriguez	A. Cotrofe	Jorge A.		2200 m	2:16 2/5		
1940	Sporting Doc	3	J. Marnies	J. Lofiego	Stud Los Pingüinos		2300 m	2:21		
1939	Cielito	4	V. Lopellegrina	E. Quijano	Stud The Ladie's		2200 m	2:19 2/5		
1938	Bernabé	5	S. B. Acosta	C. Martinez	Stud Don Severino		2300 m	2:26 3/5		
1937	Bernabé	4	A. A. Diaz	C. Martinez	Stud Don Severino		2200 m	2:14 4/5		
1936	Conamore	4	A. Garcia	P. Diaz	Julio Oscar		2300 m	2:21 3/5		
1935	Lanark	4	O. A. Nardi	E. Ruiz	Stud Condal		3000 m	3:08 2/5		
1934	El Cocinero	4	A. Delgado	J. J. Boni	Stud A.L.H.		2300 m	2:25		
1933	Danzadora ƒ	5	L. P. Menini	A. Cotrofe	Stud Norte		2300 m	2:20 3/5		
1932	Gaseta II	4	A. Moreno	L. Andreoni	Julio Oscar		2300 m	2:21		
1931	Ned	4	B. Loilana	L. Alarcón	Stud General Rivas		2300 m	2:20 3/5		
1930	Race not run									
1929	Race not run									
1928	Race not run									
1927	Race not run									
1926	Cals	4	P. Cuchinelli	M. Acosta	Stud J.A.S.	Haras Los Cardales	2300 m	2:31 4/5		
1925	Pasha Bey	4	J. Canal	J. O. Jones	Stud El Pueblo		2300 m	2:21 2/5		
1924	Cartagines	5	E. Orduna	T. Silva	Stud La Chiquita		2300 m	2:22 1/5		
1923	Calcador	4	M. Di Biase	J. Llompart	Stud La Weisita	Haras Pelayo	2300 m	2:23		
1922	Atencion	5	P. Alvarez	J. A. Penna	Stud Vertiente	Haras Las Ortigas	2300 m	2:22 4/5		
1921	Nut Cracker	4	J. Ger	F. F. Bazterrica	Stud Don Carlos	Juan Panero	2300 m	2:22 3/5		
1920	Lucky Day	4	A. G. Bourean	A. Dellagiovanna	Stud Pensamiento	Haras Las Ortigas	2300 m	2:28		
1919	Vogt	4	M. Altamiranda	M. de Los Santos	Stud Los Bohemios		2300 m	2:26 2/5		
1918	Lord Beatty	5	M. Romero	Z. Lacruz	E. Frazer		2100 m	2:09 4/5		
1917	Maraschino	5	O. González	F. Polleri	Stud Palermo	Haras Santa Rosa	2200 m	2:17	Dead heat	
1917	Dieufort	5	L. G. Velázquez	S. Roygt	Stud Yankee	Haras Santa Ana	2200 m	2:17	Dead heat	
1916	Prince	3	S. T. Gomez	D. L. Gomez	Stud Stockwel	Haras El Hogar	2330 m	2:26		
1915	Campesino	4	T. Grigera	M. de Los Santos	Stud Touchstone	Haras Ojo de Agua	2300 m	2:24 1/5		

ƒ indicates a filly/mare
