= Calidoscopio =

Argentinean Thoroughbred racehorse

- Sire: Luhuk
- Grandsire: Forty Niner
- Dam: Calderona
- Damsire: Lefty
- Sex: Stallion
- Foaled: September 10, 2003
- Country: Argentina
- Color: Bay
- Breeder: Haras La Quebrada
- Owner: Dona Pancha
- Record: 42: 11–5–8
- Earnings: $975,154

Major wins
- Clásico Ayacucho (2007,2010); Clásico Republica Argentina (2009); Clásico General Pueyrredon (2009); Clásico Vicente L. Casares (2011); Gran Premio Vicente Dupuy (2012); Clásico General Belgrano (2012); Breeders' Cup Marathon (2012); Brooklyn Handicap (2013)

Calidoscopio (foaled September 10, 2003) is a retired Argentinean racehorse who is best known for his victories in the Breeders' Cup Marathon, and the Brooklyn Handicap.

== Racing style ==
Calidoscopio's racing style is the main reason for his popularity as he is well known as being one of the best deep closers in modern racing. Not in the same way as other famous closers horses like Zenyatta or Street Sense as Calidoscopio tends to be a little beyond that. Rather than just trailing the field Calidoscopio has gone as far as to disconnect himself from the rest of the field. In the Breeders Cup Marathon and Brooklyn Handicap, he was so far back that he either was on the far right of the wide camera or just out of view. Very akin to Silky Sullivan he is one of the few other horses who made a name for himself with this extreme tactic, the major difference is Calidoscopio ran his best races at longer distances of 1 1/4-1 3/4 miles while Silky Sullivan was more of a sprinter/miler.

== Career ==
=== Argentine career ===
Calidoscopio was foaled in Argentina. He is by Luhuk and out of Calderona, a daughter of Lefty. He was bred by Haras La Quebrada and during his racing career was owned by Dona Pancha Stud. His trainer in Argentina was Guillermo Frenkel Santillan. He made his first start when he was four years old, later than most horses. He broke his maiden in his second start and then won his first graded stakes race, the Grade 2 Clásico Chacabuco. There he battled Ibope in a stretch duel, prevailing in the last few strides by a neck. This was the first of seven graded stakes races that he won in Argentina. He concluded his first year of racing with the first of two wins in the Clásico Ayacucho. He did not win another race until his six-year-old season, in the Grade 1 Republica Argentina in 2009, although he didn't cross the wire first. The initial victor was Mestre, who closed from the back with Calidoscopio, but Mestre cut off Calidoscopio in the stretch, causing him to check. Calidoscopio regrouped but missed by a neck. The interference led to Mestre getting disqualified and placed second behind Calidoscopio. It was the only time Calidoscopio won win a Grade 1 race. He overcame mild interference again in his next victory, the Grade 2 Clásico General Pueyrredon, as he navigated between multiple horses from the back. After he was clear in second place, leader Best Guest veered from the outside to the rail, and Calidoscopio made a small check-up. He then moved to Best Guest's outside, running him down and winning by half a length.

He raced until the age of nine in Argentina, making three starts there that year. Two of them were wins, the first coming in the Clásico Vicente Dupay where he made a huge move from the far outside more than ten lengths back, catching runaway leader Fuerte Senal to win by a length. Next he ran ninth in the Republica Argentina. His final race in Argentina was the Grade 2 Clásico General Belgrano, where he went to the far outside and won with a length to spare.

=== American career ===
After his win in the General Belgrano, Calidiscopio then was sent to America for his next race, the Breeders’ Cup Marathon, a Grade II race. He didn't race for five months as he prepared for the biggest race of his career. One of the biggest changes was a change of jockey from regular rider Pablo Falero to American jockey Aaron Gryder. To get to know Calidoscopio better, Gryder watched DVDs of Calidoscopio's wins in Argentina.[1] He had befriended the trainers of Calidoscopio when they were in America and soon earned the mount. Initially, the horse proved a little tricky for Gryder, stopping and looking around and not being eager to get into his breeze. The jockey said that the initial difficulty was "because he was smarter than I was." Gryder said saying multiple times in the days leading up to the race that he was going to win. He was instructed to detach himself from the rest of the field and let his mount settle. Calidoscopio dropped as far as 20 1/4[2] lengths behind the leaders as Belmont Stakes third-place finisher and Marathon favorite Atigun was in the lead. Sense Of Purpose and Fame And Glory pulled up out of the race as Calidoscopio slowly began to accelerate going down the backstretch for the second time. He went to the outside and swept by the two leaders, Atigun and Grassy, and opened up 4 and 1/4 lengths on Grassy and win the race. This was historic as he was both the oldest horse and the first Argentinean horse to win a Breeders’ Cup race.

He returned for two more starts at age ten. The first was the Tokyo City Cup Stakes, a race he was nearly scratched from due to cutting one of his front hooves. He stayed closer to the pace than usual, only 11 and 1/2 lengths behind the leaders at worst. But he didn't kick on the same way he did in the Breeders’ Cup and finished fifth. Gryder later said that he "wasn't 100%.” In the Brooklyn Handicap, his main competition was Percussion, who led from nearly start to finish, and Ruler On Ice, the winner of the Belmont Stakes two years earlier. This race favored Ruler On Ice as it was the same distance and sloppy conditions as the Belmont. Even with these circumstances, Ruler On Ice proved not a factor as Percussion set the pace alone. Calidoscopio disconnected from the field once more, falling 22 lengths behind. Just as in the Breeders’ Cup Marathon, Calidoscopio rallied. After going widest into the far turn, he continued to run on the outside, passing everyone. He ran down Percussion, who had a three-length lead at the top of the stretch, to win by a length, and became the oldest winner of the Brooklyn, beating out the previous record-holder, Borrow, by a year. He also became the second 10-year-old horse to win a graded stakes in North America (the first one being Musketier) and the only 10-year-old to win a graded stakes in the United States. Calidoscopio soon retired, not due to his age but because of a relatively minor tendon injury. His race record concluded with 42:11-5-8, with total earnings just under a million dollars, at $975,154. He currently stands at stud in Argentina at Haras La Quebrada.
