= Günther Hussong =

German poet and cabaret artist (1948–2025)

Günther Hussong (17 June 1948 – 21 August 2025) was a German dialect poet, cabaret artist, composer and CD producer.

== Life and career ==
Hussong was born in Kirkel on 17 June 1948. His profession was teacher of geography, Protestant religion and French at the Von der Leyen-Gymnasium in Blieskastel. When living in Emden (1977–1991), Hussong discovered his love for the dialect being spoken in the region “Saarpfalz” and he published a dictionary about this dialect in 1991. After his return to the Saarland he was at first author and editor of the home-calendar Momentaufnahmen. In 1997, Hussong produced the CD E weider Wää noo Bethlehem (the Christmas-story according to Gospel of Luke told in the dialect of the region) as writer and speaker. In 2001, he produced his second CD Das doo fangt joo gut an (the dialect version of the history of creation from the Big Bang to the Great Flood). In 2004, he edited the CD Nix wie lauder Huddel with abstracts from his dialect-cabaret-programmes (titled de Plattmacher).

In 2001, Hussong was appointed to the Bosener Gruppe, a federation of renowned artists from Lorraine, Rheinland-Pfalz, Baden-Württemberg, Alsace and Saarland. He represented the dialect being spoken in his region (Saarland and Pfalz) in Kiel, at the celebration of the German Unification Day in 2001.

Hussong won many dialect contest awards in the categories lyric (2002: Zivilcourage), prose (2003: Spendegeld and 2006 Nix wie Huddel mit 'ihm' und 'ihm') as well as scenic presentation (2005: Plato platt, Plato's Cave Analogy as a funny breakfast conversation of a couple). Other activities are contributions to church services, publications on school politics, working for the chronicle of the gymnastics club Kirkel and many contributions to radio and television.

Hussong died on 21 August 2025, at the age of 77.

== Publications ==
- CD: E weider Wää noo Bethlehem (1997). The Christmas-story according to the Gospel of St.Luke with songs (Music: Herry Schmitt, Singer: Angela Branca)
- CD: Das doo fangt joo gut an (2001). The dialect version of the history of creation from the Big Bang to the Great Flood; (Music: Herry Schmitt, Singer: Angela Branca)
- CD: Nix wie lauder Huddel (2004). Live-recording of a performance in the Saarbrücker theatre Blauer Hirsch
- Dictionary on his region: Meer Kirkeler (1991), illustrated by Wanger
