= Husson (surname) =

Husson is a French surname. Notable people with this surname include:

- Albert Husson (1912–1978), French playwright and theatre director
- Édouard Husson (born 1969), French historian and former CEO of ESCP Europe
- Éric Husson (born 1963), French sports leader and politician
- Guy Husson (1931–2025), French track and field athlete
- Honoré Jean Aristide Husson (1803–1864), French academic sculptor
- Jules Fleury-Husson (1821–1889), French art critic who wrote under the name Champfleury
- Marcel Husson (1937–2025), French football player and manager
- Michelle Jenner Husson (born 1986), Spanish cinema and television actress
- Thérèse-Adèle Husson (1803–1831), French writer in the post-revolutionary period
