= Gran Premio Polla de Potrancas (Argentina) =

- Class: Group 1
- Inaugurated: 1895
- Race type: Flat / Thoroughbred

Race information
- Distance: 1600 meters
- Surface: Dirt
- Track: Hipódromo Argentino de Palermo
- Qualification: Three-Year-Old fillies
- Weight: 56 kg
- Purse: $106,500,000 ARS (2026); 1st: $50,000,000 ARS

The Gran Premio Polla de Potrancas Group 1 flat horse race in Argentina open to three-year-old fillies run over a distance of 1,600 metres (0.99 mi) at Hipódromo Argentino de Palermo. It is the first race in the Argentinian Filly Triple Crown, and equivalent to the English 1000 Guineas Stakes. It is considered one of the principle races in defining the champion three-year-old filly, and generally occurs in September, near the beginning of a horse's three-year-old season.

== History ==
The Gran Premio Polla de Potrancas was first run in 1895.

For three years in a row, from 1991 to 1993, the winner was owned and bred by Haras La Quebrada, trained by Carlos Alberto Zarlengo, and ridden by Jacinto Rafael Herrera.

== Records since 1988 ==
Speed record:

- 1:32.47 – Madonna Benois (2023)

Largest margin of victory:

- 9 lengths – La Costa Azul (1993)
- 9 lengths – Carta Embrujada (2021)

Most wins by a jockey:

- 5 – Pablo Gustavo Falero (1997, 2003, 2007, 2008, 2011)
- 4 – Jacinto Rafael Herrera (1991, 1992, 1993, 2000)

Most wins by a trainer:

- 6 – Juan Carlos Etchechoury (1999, 2004, 2007, 2009, 2010, 2015)

Most wins by an owner:

- 4 – Haras Vacacion (1988,1989, 1997, 2011)
- 4 – Haras La Quebrada (1991, 1992, 1993, 2000)

Most wins by a breeder:

- 4 – Haras La Biznaga (1999, 2004, 2017, 2019)
- 4 – Haras Vacacion (1988,1989, 1997, 2011)
- 4 – Haras La Quebrada (1991, 1992, 1993, 2000)

Lowest odds of a winner:

- 1.45 – Southern Spring (1996)
- 1.45 – Miss Terrible (2002)

Highest odds of a winner:

- 29.35 – Querida Rebeca (2013)

== Winners since 1988 ==
Year	Winner	Jockey	Trainer	Owner	Breeder	Time	Margin	Ref
2026	Look At To Me	William Pereyra	Roberto Pellegatta	Haras Al Adiyaat	Haras Al Adiyaat	1:37.38	4 lengths	
2025	Moon Frank	Brian Rodrigo Enrique	Diego Peña	Haras Gran Muñeca	Haras Gran Muñeca	1:35.72	1 length	
2024	Pulp Fiction	Martín Javier Valle	María Cristina Muñoz	Stud Parque Patricios	Haras Inversiones Elturf	1:34.96	2 lengths	
2023	Madonna Benois	F. Fernandes Gonçalves	Carlos Arnaldo Vigil	Stud Tres Jotas (LP)	Haras El Paraiso	1:32.47	1/2 length	
2022	Una Arrabalera	F. Fernandes Gonçalves	Claudia Leonor Bellier	Stud Tinta Roja (LP)	Haras Renacer	1:34.14	1/2 length	
2021	Carta Embrujada	Juan Carlos Noriega	Juan Franco Saldivia	Stud La Leyenda	Haras La Leyenda de Areco	1:34.42	9 lengths	
2020	Scotish Star	Altair Domingos	Pedro Nickel	Haras La Providencia	Haras La Providencia	1:34.79	1 1/2 lengths	
2019	Joy Canela	Pavon Eduardo Ortega	Enrique Martin Ferro	Stud Puey (LP)	Haras La Biznaga	1:35.53	1 1/2 lengths	
2018	Summer Love	Juan Carlos Noriega	Juan Franco Saldivia	Stud La Leyenda	Haras La Leyenda de Areco	1:34.44	4 lengths	
2017	Atomica Oro	Fabricio Raúl Barroso	Roberto M. Bullrich	Haras La Biznaga	Haras La Biznaga	1:33.58	2 1/2 lengths	
2016	Hispanidad	José Aparecido da Silva	Pedro Nickel	Haras La Providencia	Haras La Providencia	1:33.64	Neck	
2015	Amy B Key	Rodrigo Gonzalo Blanco	Juan Carlos Etchechoury	Clara Manuel	Haras El Alfalfar	1:34.65	2 lengths	
2014	Kalithea	Jorge Gustavo Ruíz Diaz	Juan Bautista Udaondo	Haras Santa Ines	Haras Santa Ines	1:35.35	Head	
2013	Querida Rebeca	Jorge Gustavo Ruíz Diaz	Juan Bautista Udaondo	Haras Santa Ines	Haras Santa Ines	1:38.43	3/4 length	
2012	Candy Nevada	Altair Domingos	José Martins Alves	Haras La Providencia	Haras La Providencia	1:35.57	2 lengths	
2011	Balada Sale	Pablo Gustavo Falero	Juan Sebastian Maldotti	Haras Vacacion	Haras Vacacion	1:35.73	4 lengths	
2010	Catch the Mad	Edwin Rafael Talaverano Cardenas	Juan Carlos Etchechoury	Haras Firmamento	Haras Firmamento	1:36.67	3 lengths	
2009	La Severa	Gustavo Emiliano Calvente	Juan Carlos Etchechoury	Haras de la Pomme	Haras de la Pomme	1:33.65	1/2 length	
2008	Savoir Bien	Pablo Gustavo Falero	Carlos D. Etchechoury	Haras Santa Maria de Araras	Haras Santa Maria de Araras	1:34.25	4 lengths	
2007	Mariah Plus	Pablo Gustavo Falero	Juan Carlos Etchechoury	Woodvale Farm	Haras Abolengo	1:33.81	6 lengths	
2006	Emotion Parade	Edwin Rafael Talaverano Cardenas	Miguel Angel Garcia	Haras Firmamento	Haras Firmamento	1:34.03	2 1/2 lengths	
2005	Vanguarda	Horacio Julian Betansos	Antonio Di Sanzo	Stud 1912 (LP)	Haras Santa Maria de Araras	1:36.45	2 1/2 lengths	
2004	Forty Marchanta	Jorge Valdivieso	Juan Carlos Etcehchoury	Haras La Biznaga	Haras La Biznaga	1:34.31	3/4 length	
2003	Salt Champ	Pablo Gustavo Falero	Juan Carlos Maldotti	Stud E.V.G.	Alvaro Vargas Lerena	1:35.08	5 lengths	
2002	Miss Terrible	Edgardo Gramática	Miguel Angel Garcia	Haras Firmamento	Haras Firmamento	1:35.57	2 1/2 lengths	
2001	Kiss Me Sweet	Jorge Valdivieso	Carlos D. Etchechoury	Haras Santa Maria de Araras	Haras Santa Maria de Araras	1:34.47	1 1/2 lengths	
2000	Guernika	Jacinto Rafael Herrera	Nicolas Adrian Yalet	Haras La Quebrada	Haras La Quebrada	1:35.19	Head	
1999	Pomarola Talk	Jorge Valdivieso	Juan Carlos Etcehchoury	Haras La Biznaga	Haras La Biznaga	1:36.67	1 length	
1998	Nortak	Miguel Ángel Abregú	Carlos D. Etchechoury	Haras Orilla del Monte	Haras Comalal	1:36.22	7 lengths	
1997	Croassant	Pablo Gustavo Falero	Juan Carlos Maldotti	Haras Vacacion	Haras Vacacion	1:36.50	1/2 neck	
1996	Southern Spring	Juan José Paule	Eduardo M. Martínez de Hoz	Stud Matty	Haras Las Matildes	1:33.26	7 lengths	
1995	Escabiosa	Eduardo Alejandro Karamanos Horacio	Aldo Omar Pappaterra	Stud Rosuer	Haras Las Ortigas	1:36.23	2 1/2 lengths	
1994	Star and Stripes	Yolanda Beatriz Davila	Luis Eduardo Seglin	Stud Dulcinea (LP)	Haras El Candil	1:35.52	Neck	
1993	La Costa Azul	Jacinto Rafael Herrera	Carlos Alberto Zarlengo	Haras La Quebrada	Haras La Quebrada	1:37.04	9 lengths	
1992	Numeraria	Jacinto Rafael Herrera	Carlos Alberto Zarlengo	Haras La Quebrada	Haras La Quebrada	1:38.56	Neck	
1991	Fontemar	Jacinto Rafael Herrera	Carlos Alberto Zarlengo	Haras La Quebrada	Haras La Quebrada	1:36.10	Head	
1990	Luna Rose	Edgardo Gramática	Juan Carlos Maldotti	Stud Tori	Haras La Madrugada	1:37.49	3/4 length	
1989	Rafaga		Daniel Adami	Haras Vacacion	Haras Vacacion	1:35.12	7 lengths	
1988	La Maltrecha		Marcelo P. Saravi	Haras Vacacion	Haras Vacacion	1:35.37	1/2 head	

== Earlier winners ==
- 1895: Rose Royale and Framboise (DH)
- 1896: Little Darling
- 1897: Citoyenne
- 1898: Guiña
- 1899: Carina
- 1900: Fantasia
- 1901: Fedra
- 1902: Berezina
- 1903: Breva
- 1904: Ganzúa
- 1905: Primera Tiple
- 1906: Segura
- 1907: Rancagua
- 1908: Rubicela
- 1909: Pega Pega
- 1910: Locandiera
- 1911: Aldeana
- 1912: Salina
- 1913: Piscueta
- 1914: Avicenia
- 1915: Ocurrencia
- 1916: Diakova
- 1917: Dalmacia
- 1918: Paulonia
- 1919: Cartagena
- 1920: Papusa
- 1921: Cerámica
- 1922: Black Beauty
- 1923: Grue
- 1924: Anatema
- 1925: Melzeta
- 1926: Vainilla
- 1927: Antígona
- 1928: Favella
- 1929: Salmuera
- 1930: Sierra Balcarce
- 1931: Muralla
- 1932: Zumayita
- 1933: Tauma
- 1934: Black Arrow
- 1935: Mesapia
- 1936: Canícula
- 1937: Hulla
- 1938: Ibis II
- 1939: Heil!
- 1940: La Mission
- 1941: Blackie II
- 1942: Dalilah
- 1943: Platería
- 1944: Cancagua and Quisguillosa (DH)
- 1945: Half Crown
- 1946: Miss Alesia and Niña Bruja (DH)
- 1947: Bullanquera
- 1948: Empeñosa
- 1949: White Milk
- 1950: Melody
- 1951: Melody
- 1952: Satánica
- 1953: Claro de Luna
- 1954: Elite
- 1955: Chapineta and Las Canas (DH)
- 1956: Tana Linda
- 1957: Catando
- 1958:Soldadesca
- 1959: Pontia
- 1960: Melodie
- 1961: Pasión
- 1962: Tacha
- 1963: Donna II
- 1964: Lady Silver II
- 1965: SweetSue II
- 1966: Himera
- 1967: Rafale
- 1968: Farm
- 1969: La Sevillana
- 1970: Tutta Bionda
- 1971: La Alianza
- 1972: Inmaculada
- 1973: Biella
- 1974: Contraventora
- 1975: Legent II
- 1976: Taba
- 1977: Mía
- 1978: Seed
- 1979: Manzanera
- 1980: Miss Nymph
- 1981: Málaga
- 1982: Triumphal
- 1983: Mustard
- 1984: Semilleta
- 1985: Frau Altiva
- 1986: Exalsa
- 1987: Podeica
