= Gran Premio Jorge de Atucha =

G1 horse race in Argentina

- Class: Group 1
- Inaugurated: 1935

Race information
- Distance: 1500 meters
- Surface: Dirt
- Track: Hipódromo Argentino de Palermo
- Qualification: Two-year-old fillies
- Weight: 55 kg
- Purse: $53,250,000 ARS (2026); 1st: $25,000,000 ARS

The Gran Premio Jorge de Atucha (previously known as the Clásico Jorge Atucha, Premio Jorge Atucha, Premio General Las Heras) is a Group 1 thoroughbred horse race run at Hipódromo Argentino de Palermo in Buenos Aires, Argentina, open to two-year-old fillies. It is run over a distance of 1500 metres (0.93 mi) on the dirt.

== History ==
The Gran Premio Jorge de Atucha was first run in 1935.

The race was run as the Premio General Las Heras in 1954 and 1955.

The Gran Premio Jorge de Atucha is considered to be an important race leading up to the three-year-old year for fillies as its 1500-meter distance is close to the classic distance of 1600 meters, at which races like the Group 1 Gran Premio Polla de Potrancas and Group 1 Gran Premio Estrellas Juvenile Fillies are run. Nineteen winners of the Gran Premio Jorge de Atucha have gone on to win the Polla de Potrancas, including Miss Nymph, Southern Spring, and Miss Terrible.

== Records since 1988 ==
Speed record:

- 1:26.67 – Southern Spring (1996)

Greatest winning margin:

- 9 lengths – Rosadora (1988) & Southern Spring (1996)

Most wins by a jockey:

- 9 – Pablo Gustavo Falero (1992, 1993, 1995, 2000, 2001, 2005, 2008, 2009, 2016)

Most wins by a trainer:

- 5 – Juan Carlos Maldotti (1992, 1995, 2000, 2001, 2005)
- 4 – Roberto Pellegatta (2004, 2006, 2011, 2024)
- 3 – Juan Carlos Etchechoury (2013, 2016, 2025)

Most wins by an owner:

- 5 – Haras Vacacion (1988, 1995, 2000, 2001, 2016)
- 4 – Haras Firmamento (1989, 1991, 2002, 2013)

Most wins by a breeder:

- 6 – Haras Firmamento (1989, 1991, 1999, 2002, 2013, 2017)
- 5 – Haras Vacacion (1995, 1997, 2000, 2001, 2016)
- 4 – Haras Abolengo (1998, 2011, 2014, 2015)
- 3 – Haras La Biznaga (2003, 2004, 2019)
- 3 – Haras La Quebrada (1994, 2006, 2010)

== Winners since 1988 ==
Year	Winner	Jockey	Trainer	Owner	Breeder	Time	Margin	Ref
2026	Gran Gotera	Martín Javier Valle	Carlos Alberto Domingo	Stud Tinta Roja	Haras Gran Muñeca	1:30.93	Neck	
2025	Roshita	William Pereyra	Juan Carlos Etchechoury	Stud Rubio B.	Haras La Pasion	1:28.58	6 lengths	
2024	Ooty	Juan Carlos Noriega	Roberto Pellegatta	Stud Al Adiyaat	Haras Al Adiyaat Argentina	1:28.12	1/2 head	
2023	Joy Rosy	Eduardo Ortega Pavón	Nicolás Martín Ferro	Stud R.M.	Haras ARG Sales	1:28.81	1/2 neck	
2022	Tan Gritona	Brian Rodrigo Enrique	José Luiz Correa Aranha	Stud Haras Gran Muñeca	Stud Haras Gran Muñeca	1:27.27	1 1/2 lengths	
2021	Carta Embrujada	Juan Carlos Noriega	Juan Franco Saldivia	Stud La Leyenda	Haras La Leyenda de Areco	1:27.24	4 lengths	
2020	Race not run							
2019	Joy Epifora	Iván E. Monasterolo	Juan Manuel Etchechoury	Stud La Nora	Haras La Biznaga	1:27.49	2 1/2 lengths	
2018	Hacksaw Ridge	José A. Da Silva	Juan Javier Etchechoury	Stud RDI	Haras Rio Dois Irmãos	1:28.43	1/2 length	
2017	Giuliet Seattle	Gustavo N. Villalba	Carlos Alberto Bani	Stud Doña Serafina	Haras Firmamento	1:28.64	1 1/2 lengths	
2016	Schoolmistress	Pablo Gustavo Falero	Juan Carlos Etchechoury	Haras Vacacion	Haras Vacacion	1:27.05	4 lengths	
2015	Vale Dori	Altair Domingos	Antonio H. Marsiglia	Stud El Zorrito	Haras Abolengo	1:29.64	3 lengths	
2014	Contessa Linda	Mario Luis Leyes	Juan Daniel Staiano	Stud Eseerreefe	Haras Abolengo	1:28.98	1 1/2 lengths	
2013	Locasa Nistel	Jorge G. Ruíz Díaz	Juan Carlos Etchechoury	Haras Firmamento	Haras Firmamento	1:28.59	1 1/2 lengths	
2012	Smashing Glory	Jorge Antonio Ricardo	Juan Javier Etchechoury	Stud Rubio B.	Haras La Pasion	1:30.02	1 1/2 lengths	
2011	Gamuza Fina	Mario E. Fernández	Roberto Pellegatta	Stud A.J.M.	Haras Abolengo	1:31.07	4 lengths	
2010	Studentessa	Néstor F. Fernández	Elvio Ramon Bortule	Stud Cheche	Haras La Quebrada	1:29.31	1/2 length	
2009	Ishitaki	Pablo Gustavo Falero	Edmundo I. Rodríguez	Stud Arcangel	Haras Don Arcangel	1:30.02	8 lengths	
2008	Savoir Bien	Pablo Gustavo Falero	Carlos D. Etchechoury	Haras Santa Maria de Araras	Haras Santa Maria de Araras	1:29.91	1/2 neck	
2007	Scenica	Cardenas E. Talaverano	César Augusto Garat	Haras Don Santiago	Haras Don Santiago	1:30.29	5 lengths	
2006	Batallosa	Gustavo E. Calvente	Roberto Pellegatta	Haras La Quebrada	Haras La Quebrada	1:29.20	3/4 length	
2005	Safari Queen	Pablo Gustavo Falero	Juan Carlos Maldotti	Haras Santa Maria de Araras	Haras Santa Maria de Araras	1:30.74	Neck	
2004	Forty Greeta	Jorge Valdivieso	Roberto Pellegatta	Haras La Biznaga	Haras La Biznaga	1:29.85	5 lengths	
2003	South Vagabunda	Jorge Valdivieso	Roberto M. Bullrich	Haras La Biznaga	Haras La Biznaga	1:29.69	2 lengths	
2002	Miss Terrible	Edgardo Gramática	Miguel Ángel García	Haras Firmamento	Haras Firmamento	1:29.75	6 lengths	
2001	Randy Cat	Pablo Gustavo Falero	Juan Carlos Maldotti	Haras Vacacion	Haras Vacacion	1:30.24	Neck	
2000	April Talk	Pablo Gustavo Falero	Juan Carlos Maldotti	Haras Vacacion	Haras Vacacion	1:28.81	3 lengths	
1999	Crazy Ensign	Rubén Emilio Laitán	Juan Carlos Bianchi	Stud El Faruk	Haras Firmamento	1:31.02	4 lengths	
1998	Esperada	Horacio E. Karamanos	Roberto A. Pellegatta	Stud A.J.M.	Haras Abolengo	1:28.00	3 lengths	
1997	Slew of Reality	Horacio E. Karamanos	Juan A. Colucho	Haras Las Telas	Haras Vacacion	1:29.67	2 lengths	
1996	Southern Spring	Juan José Paulé	Eduardo M. Martínez de Hoz	Stud Matty	Haras Las Matildes	1:26.67	9 lengths	
1995	Liberiana	Pablo Gustavo Falero	Juan Carlos Maldotti	Haras Vacacion	Haras Vacacion	1:28.82	4 lengths	
1994	Cadeaux	Jacinto R. Herrera	Carlos Alberto Zarlengo	Haras La Quebrada	Haras La Quebrada	1:28.02	8 lengths	
1993	Parfait Amour	Pablo Gustavo Falero	Eduardo F. Croza	Stud El Apolo	Haras Los Apamates	1:31.59	1 length	
1992	Potridee	Pablo Gustavo Falero	Juan Carlos Maldotti	Stud Tori	Haras La Madrugada	1:30.50	1 1/2 lengths	
1991	Kascura	Edgardo Gramática	Miguel Ángel García	Haras Firmamento	Haras Firmamento	1:30.00	1 1/2 lengths	
1990	Pulma	Daniel Jorge Ojeda	Antonio Gomez Derli	Stud Happy End	Francisco Lococo	1:31.70	5 lengths	
1989	Saldeable	Daniel Jorge Ojeda	Juan Roberto Gutierrez	Haras Firmamento	Haras Firmamento	1:31.88		
1988	Rosadora	Juan Alberto Maciel	Juan A. Ferreyra	Haras Vacacion	Haras de la Pomme		9 lengths	

== Earlier winners ==
- 1935: Sonsita
- 1936: Matagana
- 1937: Hulla
- 1938: Ibis
- 1939: Herodias
- 1940: La Mission
- 1941: Hop-on
- 1942: Ridere
- 1943: Aleta
- 1944: Cancagua
- 1945: Half Crown
- 1946: Niña Bruja
- 1947: Bullanguera
- 1948: Eneide
- 1949: Marielle
- 1950: Melody
- 1951: Sandalia
- 1952: Elma
- 1953: Sidérea
- 1954: Luce
- 1955: La Maravilla
- 1956: Tana Linda
- 1957: Precinta
- 1958: Pensilvania
- 1959: La Gloria
- 1960: Melodie
- 1961: Jezabel
- 1962: Tacha
- 1963: Donna
- 1964: Jessore
- 1965: Marchinha
- 1966: Vitrinome
- 1967: Rafale
- 1968: Chime
- 1969: La Sevillana
- 1970: Fontana
- 1971: Jungle Duchess
- 1972: Sena
- 1973: Ritmica
- 1974: Predileccion
- 1975: Maia
- 1976: Taba
- 1977: Mia
- 1978: Kankam
- 1979: So Joyful
- 1980: Miss Nymph
- 1981: Almira
- 1982: Trapista
- 1983: Goldenley
- 1984: Melodien
- 1985: Loca Bill
- 1986: Bien Electa
- 1987: Candila
