= Jorge Ricardo =

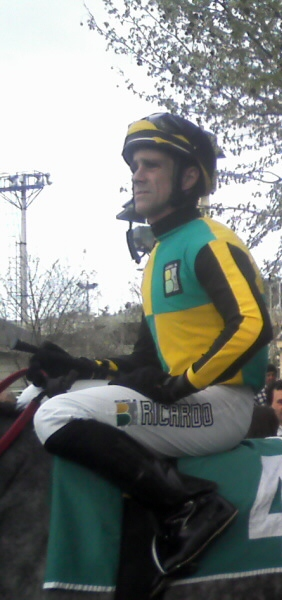

Personal information
- Born: September 30, 1961 (age 64) Rio de Janeiro, Brazil
- Occupation: Jockey

Horse racing career
- Sport: Horse racing
- Career wins: 13,369(as of May 01, 2026)

Major racing wins
- Gran Premio Asociación Latinoamericana de Jockey Clubes e Hipódromos (1991, 1994, 1996, 1998, 2007) Grande Prêmio Brasil (1992, 1994); Grande Prêmio São Paulo (1994, 2005); Gran Premio Carlos Pellegrini (1994, 2003, 2014); Gran Premio Joaquín S. de Anchorena (1992, 2006, 2008); Gran Premio Internacional José Pedro Ramírez (2007); Copa de Plata Roberto Vasquez Mansilla (2006); Gran Premio Maipú (2006, 2007, 2011); Gran Premio Suipacha (2006, 2008); Gran Premio Ciudad de Buenos Aires (2007, 2008, 2010); Gran Premio Estrellas Sprint (2007); Gran Premio Estrellas Juvenile Fillies (2007, 2015); Gran Premio Miguel Alfredo Martínez de Hoz (2008, 2012); Gran Premio Montevideo (2008); Gran Premio de Potrancas (2008, 2011); Gran Premio Provincia de Buenos Aires (2008, 2011, 2016); Gran Premio Felix de Alzaga Unzué (2009, 2011); Gran Premio Estrellas Mile (2009, 2014); Gran Premio General San Martín (2010); Gran Premio Hipódromo de San Isidro (2010, 2015); Gran Premio Eliseo Ramírez (2011); Gran Premio Estrellas Juvenile (2011); Gran Premio Selección de Potrancas (2011); Gran Premio Raúl y Raúl E. Chevalier (2012); Gran Premio Jorge de Atucha (2012); Gran Premio Gran Criterium (2012); Gran Premio Hipódromo Argentino de Palermo (2012, 2017); Gran Premio Estrellas Distaff (2013, 2014); Gran Premio 25 de Mayo (2015, 2016, 2019) Gran Premio de Las Américas (2018)

Racing awards
- Brazilian Champion jockey (1982-2006); Argentine Champion jockey (2007, 2012)

Significant horses
- Much Better, Storm Military, Good Report

Jorge Antonio Ricardo (born September 30, 1961, in Rio de Janeiro, Brazil) is a jockey in South American Thoroughbred horse racing who became the highest tally winning rider in the sport on 5 February 2007. He has since been passed by Canadian-born, California-based rider Russell Baze, but on 6 February 2018 he equaled Baze's record of 12,844 wins, and surpassed that record some six weeks later.

== Biography ==
Ricardo was born into a jockey family; his father and two uncles were both jockeys. Since making his professional racing debut in 1976, he tallied 400 race wins in one year on five occasions and has been Brazil's leading tally-winning jockey for twenty-five consecutive years from 1982 through 2006.

From 1982 to 2011, he has won 29 yearly riding titles – 26 in Brazil and 3 in Argentina.

He won more than 160 Grade 1 races, including the “Gran Premio Asociación Latinoamericana de Jockey Clubes e Hipódromos” on five occasions.

The highest tally-winning horse he rode was **Much Better**.

In 1993, he beat the existing Brazilian record by winning 477 races in one year. In 2008, Ricardo beat the existing Argentinian record by winning 465 races in one year.

Competing at the Hipodromo Argentino de Palermo in Palermo, Buenos Aires, Ricardo won his 9,981st career race (up to 29 December 2007) to surpass the still active Canadian-born jockey Russell Baze as the all-time leader in racing wins. On 9 January 2008, Ricardo earned his 10,000th win riding Membresia in the 11th race at San Isidro in Buenos Aires.

On May 26, 2013, he reached 12,000 career victories. At this point, he had the world record of race wins. On February 6, 2018, Ricardo won his 12,844th race on Jubiliea to equal the record of the now-retired Baze.

Jorge Ricardo is one of the leading jockeys in the Carreras de las Estrellas with 10 wins.
