= Carreras de las Estrellas =

Series of Argentine horse races

- Class: Championship Event Series
- Location: Changes yearly
- Inaugurated: 1991
- Website: carrerasdelasestrellas.com

Race information
- Distance: See individual races
- Surface: Turf, Dirt
- Qualification: See individual races
- Weight: See individual races
- Purse: See individual races

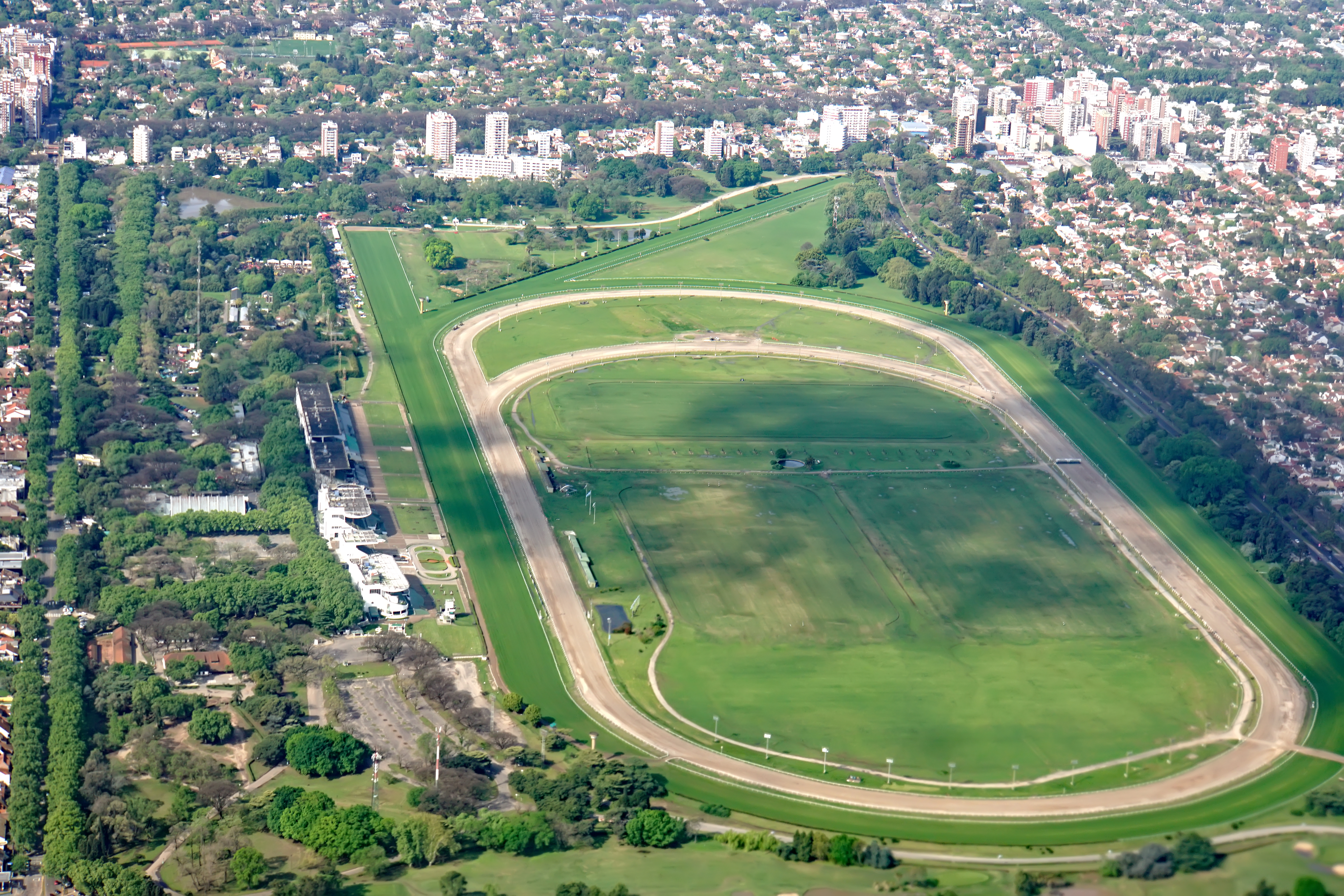
Hipódromo de San Isidro, where the first Carreras de las Estrellas meet was run.

The Carreras de las Estrellas are an annual series of thoroughbred horse races run in Argentina since 1991, inspired by the Breeders' Cup and organized by the Fundación Equina Argentina (FEAR). It is one of the most popular horse racing events in Argentina and consists of six Group 1 races, one Group 3 race, a listed restricted race, and two ungraded races.

Many important and famous Argentine racehorses have won Carreras de las Estrellas races, including Intérprete, Wally, Refinado Tom, Team, Miss Terrible, Potrillón, and Ollagua.

== History ==
Inspired by the American Breeders' Cup series, founded in 1984, the Fundación Equina Argentina (FEAR), a nonprofit association consisting of various Argentine breeders, decided to create a similar series of races in Argentina in a meeting on October 24, 1989. The initiative was led by Pedro Blaquier, who died shortly after FEAR was founded.

The first Carreras de las Estrellas meet was run on June 29, 1991, at Hipódromo de San Isidro, and consisted of three races, all of Group 1 status and for two-year-olds: the Potrillos (1600 meters for colts), Potrancas (1600 meters for fillies), and Produtos (1000 meters). These eventually became the Juvenile, Juvenile Fillies, and Junior Sprint, respectively. Intérprete, winner of the Potrillos, would go on to be named the Argentine Champion Two-Year-Old colt of that year.

The following year added the Classic, Sprint, and Provincias Argentinas, with the former two having Group 1 status and the latter being ungraded. The Classic, run over 2000 meters, and Sprint, run over 1000 meters, were restricted to three-year-olds only. The Provincias Argentinas, run over 1200 meters, was restricted to two-year-olds who had only run in the interior. In the following years, the Classic and Sprint would be opened to older horses.

The 1997 edition produced the first three-time winner of a Carreras de las Estrellas race when Wally won the Gran Premio Estrellas Sprint for the first time, and set a record betting handle of $2,130,874 with an attendance of 23,517.

The Bonus Estrellas Plus program, which provides bonuses to breeders for wins in other races, was started in 2000.

In 2020, due to the COVID-19 pandemic, the races were postponed from their usual date in late June to September and run without spectators. They were the first major races to be run in Argentina in the wake of the pandemic.

Purses were doubled from 2021 to 2022.

In 2023, the races were split over two days and purses were raised by Arg$81,600,000 with more than Arg$8,160,000 for breeders. In 2024, total prizes were Arg$343,200,000, including Arg$312,000,000 in purses and Arg$31,200,000 in breeder bonuses, triple their previous values.

In 2024, the first dead heat in a Carreras de las Estrellas race occurred when Folie Ninja and Bronx were declared the joint winners of the Gran Premio Estrellas Mile following the disqualification of El Eminente.

=== Location ===
The Carreras de las Estrellas alternate between Hipódromo de San Isidro and Hipódromo Argentino de Palermo, generally every other year. When run at Hipódomo de San Isidro, the races are run on turf, and when run at Hipódromo de Palermo, the races are run on dirt.

Hipódromo de San Isidro: 1992–1994, 1999, 2001, 2003, 2005, 2007, 2009, 2011, 2013, 2015, 2017, 2023–2024

Hipódromo Argentino de Palermo: 1995–1998, 2000, 2002, 2004, 2006, 2008, 2010, 2012, 2014, 2016, 2018–2022, 2025

=== Estrellas Provincias Argentinas ===
The only restricted race in the series until 2024, the Clásico Estrellas Provincias Argentinas is often run separately from the rest of the series.

The time gap between the Provincias Argentinas and the rest of the series means that horses can run in the Provincias Argentinas and then another race, such as Bona Speed did in 2015, winning the Provincias Argentinas on June 7 before finishing third in the Junior Sprint on June 27.

The Clásico Estrellas Provincias Argentinas has been run over a variety of distances:

- 1300 meters: 2014
- 1200 meters: 1992–2013
- 1100 meters: 2021
- 1000 meters: 2015–2019, 2022–

In 2010 and 2011 the race was restricted to maidens.

==== Tracks ====
- Hipódromo de San Isidro: 1992–1994, 2003, 2005, 2007, 2009, 2011
- Hipódromo Argentino de Palermo: 1995, 2004, 2006, 2008, 2010
- Hipódromo de Tucumán: 1996, 1999, 2001
- Hipódromo Independencia: 1997, 2000
- Jockey Club Cordoba: 1998, 2002
- Hipódromo de La Punta: 2012–2019, 2022–2025
- Hipódromo Río Cuarto: 2021

==== Winners ====
- 1992 – Marcucho
- 1993 – Make Critic
- 1994 – Telletin ƒ
- 1995 – Palominica ƒ
- 1996 – My Malice ƒ
- 1997 – Pueblo Libre
- 1998 – Crazy Mama ƒ
- 1999 – Estar Vivo
- 2000 – Ghetto
- 2001 – Emirato
- 2002 – Ultimo Aviso
- 2003 – Country Dance
- 2004 – Gorgonzola ƒ
- 2005 – Manicomico
- 2006 – Twix ƒ
- 2007 – Riomar
- 2008 – Storm Tijuil
- 2009 – Beauty Vision
- 2010 – Sushi Club
- 2011 – Candy King
- 2012 – Honor Charrúa
- 2013 – Cartezino
- 2014 – Ver Seattle
- 2015 – Bona Speed ƒ
- 2016 – Chicago
- 2017 – Donofrio
- 2018 – Il Vesubio
- 2019 – Estadista Rate ƒ
- 2021 – True Command
- 2022 – Que Ha Pasado
- 2023 – Frack Sand
- 2024 – Gritalo Gringo
- 2025 – Opi Nails ƒ
- 2026 – Venerado

ƒ indicates a filly

==== Records ====
Speed record

- :56.60 – Frack Sand (2023)

Greatest winning margin

- 16 lengths – Crazy Mama (1998)

Most wins by a jockey

- 2 – Ángel G. Cardozo (1999, 2001)
- 2 – Lautaro E. Balmaceda (2012, 2015)
- 2 – Facundo M. Quinteros (2016, 2017)

Most wins by a trainer

- 2 – Luis Fuentes (1997, 2000)
- 2 – Mario C. Ciccio (2007, 2011)
- 2 – Justo Luis Alonso (2009, 2021)
- 2 – Mario Luis Glades (2017, 2018)
- 2 – Oscar Antonio Rebora (2019, 2022)

Most wins by an owner

- 2 – Stud L. & R. (1997, 2000)
- 2 – Stud Rodolflo (1999, 2011)
- 2 – Stud Esquina Alta (2019, 2022)

Most wins by a breeder

- 7 – Haras Abolengo (1992, 2013, 2015, 2017, 2019, 2023, 2026)

=== Estrellas Dirt Junior ===
Introduced in 2024, the Clásico Estrellas Dirt Junior is run over 1300 meters on the dirt for two-year-olds who have raced exclusively in the interior (and thus not Hipódromo Argentino de Palermo, Hipódromo de San Isidro, or Hipódromo de La Plata). Unlike other races in the series, it is run exclusively on the dirt.

==== Winners ====
- 2024 – Apple of My Eye
- 2025 – Neon Boy
- 2026 – Vivir En Paz

==== Records ====
Speed record

- 1:16.45 – Neon Boy (2025)

Greatest winning margin

- 3 1/2 lengths – Apple of My Eye (2024)

=== Estrellas Dirt ===
Introduced in 2024, the Clásico Estrellas Dirt is run over 1300 meters on the dirt for fillies and mares three-years-old and up. Unlike other races in the series, it is run exclusively on the dirt.

==== Winners ====
- 2024 – Zootopia
- 2025 – Pecadora Joy
- 2026 – Victoria Bayern

==== Records ====
Speed record

- 1:16.33 – Victoria Bayern (2026)

Greatest winning margin

- 3 1/2 lengths – Victoria Bayern (2026)

== Races ==
Race	Group	Qualifications	Distance	Years
Gran Premio Estrellas Classic	GI	3+ years old	2000 metres (1.2 mi)	1992–
Gran Premio Estrellas Distaff	GI	3+ years old fillies and mares	1800 metres (1.1 mi)	1993–
Gran Premio Estrellas Juvenile Fillies	GI	2 year old fillies	1600 metres (0.99 mi)	1991–
Gran Premio Estrellas Juvenile	GI	2 year old colts	1600 metres (0.99 mi)	1991–
Gran Premio Estrellas Sprint	GI	3+ years old	1000 metres (0.62 mi)	1992–
Gran Premio Estrellas Mile	GI	3+ years old	1600 metres (0.99 mi)	2008–
Clásico Estrellas Junior Sprint	GIII	2 year olds	1000 metres (0.62 mi)	1991–2008, 2011–
Clásico Estrellas Provincias Argentinas	Listed Restricted	2 year olds racing in the interior	1000 metres (0.62 mi)	1992–2019, 2021–
Clásico Estrellas Dirt	Ungraded	3+ years old fillies and mares	1300 metres (0.81 mi) (Dirt)	2024–
Clásico Estrellas Dirt Junior	Ungraded	2 year olds racing in the interior	1300 metres (0.81 mi) (Dirt)	2024–

== Details ==
In order to be eligible for the Carreras de las Estrellas, foals by nominated sires must be enrolled in the program, with the breeder and owner contributing equally to a fund that then goes towards the purses of the Carreras de las Estrellas. Stallions are nominated with their crop from the following year then being eligible. The cost for their nomination varies according to their placing on the general sire list. Non-enrolled horses are eligible for two positions in each race (although that number may be increased) with an entry cost equal to half of the purse for that race. Almost half of the approximately 8000 thoroughbreds born in Argentina per year are enrolled in the program.

All of the races are restricted to 17 entrants.

Entry into the races for Argentine horses is dependent on the accumulation of points earned in the year between one meeting of the Carreras de las Estrellas and the next. Points are awarded on the following basis, for races run at Hipódromo de San Isidro, Hipódromo Argentino de Palermo, and Hipódromo de La Plata:

Point System
	1st place	2nd place	3rd place	4th place
Group 1	5 points	4 points	3 points	2 points
Group 2	4 points	3 points	2 points	1 point
Group 3	3 points	2 points	1 point	0.5 points
Listed stakes	2 points	1 point		
Specials and handicaps	1 point			
Conditional races	0.5 points			

Foreign horses are allowed entry on an individual assessment of their past performances.

== Winners and records ==
=== Most wins ===
==== Jockeys ====
- Pablo Gustavo Falero – 26
- Jacinto R. Herrera – 22
- Juan Carlos Noriega – 17
- Gustavo E. Calvente – 12
- Jorge Ricardo – 10
- Eduardo Ortega Pavón – 10

==== Trainers ====
- Juan Carlos Etchechoury – 21
- Roberto Pellegatta – 17
- Carlos D. Etchechoury – 12
- Alfredo F. Gaitán Dassié – 8
- Juan Carlos Maldotti – 7
- Roberto M. Bullrich – 7

==== Owners ====
Owner	Silks	Wins
Haras La Quebrada	link=https://es.wikipedia.org/wiki/Archivo:LA_QUEBRADA.png|45x45px|Horse racing silks	9
Haras Firmamento	link=https://es.wikipedia.org/wiki/Archivo:FIRMAMENTO.png|45x45px|Horse racing silks	9
Haras Vacación	link=https://es.wikipedia.org/wiki/Archivo:VACACION.png|45x45px|Horse racing silks	8
Haras Santa Maria de Araras	link=https://es.wikipedia.org/wiki/Archivo:SANTA_MARIA_DE_ARARAS.png|45x45px|Horse racing silks	6
Stud Rubio B.	link=https://es.wikipedia.org/wiki/Archivo:RUBIO_B.png|45x45px|Horse racing silks	6
Haras La Providencia	link=https://es.wikipedia.org/wiki/Archivo:LA_PROVIDENCIA.png|45x45px|Horse racing silks	6

==== Breeders ====
- Haras La Quebrada – 31
- Haras Abolengo – 25
- Haras Vacacion – 22
- Haras Firmamento – 21
- Haras La Biznaga – 14

=== Repeat winners ===
The following horses have won the same race at least twice:

- Classic: El Compinche (1996, 1998)
- Distaff: Ollagua (2009, 2010)
- Sprint: Wally (1995, 1996, 1997), Elogiado (2018, 2019), Labrado (2023, 2024), Le Cornette (2025, 2026)

The following horses have won two different Carreras de las Estrellas races:

- Gold Spring: Junior Sprint in 1991, Sprint in 1992
- Refinado Tom: Juvenile in 1996, Classic in 1999
- Mister Phone: Junior Sprint in 2000, Sprint in 2002
- Feel the Race: Junior Sprint in 2014, Sprint in 2015
- Labrado: Junior Sprint in 2022, Sprint in 2023 and 2024

=== Miscellaneous ===
Greatest winning margin

- 16 lengths – Crazy Mama (1998 Provincias Argentinas)
- 14 lengths – Contante (2004 Classic)
- 12 lengths – Quiz Kid (2015 Classic)
- 11 lengths – Benefactor (2011 Junior Sprint)
