= Clásico Estrellas Junior Sprint =

Group 1 horse race in Argentina

- Class: Group 3
- Inaugurated: 1991

Race information
- Distance: 1000 meters
- Surface: Varies
- Track: Hipódromo de San Isidro or Hipódromo Argentino de Palermo
- Qualification: Two-year-olds
- Purse: $40,000,000 ARS (2026); 1st: $25,000,000 ARS

The Clásico Estrellas Junior Sprint (previously known as the Gran Premio Estrellas Junior Sprint and Gran Premio Estrellas Produtos) is a Group 3 thoroughbred horse race in Argentina that is part of the Carreras de las Estrellas and is open to two-year-old males. It is run over a distance of 1000 metres (0.62 mi) either on the turf at Hipódromo de San Isidro or on the dirt at the Hipódromo Argentino de Palermo.

== History ==
The Clásico Estrellas Junior Sprint, along with the Gran Premio Estrellas Juvenile Fillies and Gran Premio Estrellas Juvenile, was one of the inaugural races of the Carreras de las Estrellas. It was originally run under the name of the Gran Premio Estrellas Produtos and was inaugurated as a Group 1 race.

The Clásico Estrellas Junior Sprint was not run in 2009 or 2010, returning in 2011. That first year back, it was run as an ungraded stakes race, being upgraded to listed the following year. The race was upgraded again to Group 3 in 2017.

Four horses have gone to win the Gran Premio Estrellas Sprint after winning the Clásico Estrellas Junior Sprint: Gold Spring (1991 Junior Sprint, 1992 Sprint), Mister Phone (2000 Junior Sprint, 2002 Sprint), Feel the Race (2014 Junior Sprint, 2015 Sprint), and Labrado (2022 Junior Sprint, 2023 and 2024 Sprint).

== Records ==
Speed record:

- :53.06 – Rufus (2006)

Greatest winning margin:

- 11 lengths – Labrado (2022)

Most wins by a jockey:

- 4 – Jacinto R. Herrera (1991, 1999, 2001, 2002)
- 4 – Pablo Gustavo Falero (1995, 2000, 2005, 2014)
- 3 – Jorge Valdivieso (1992, 1993, 2003)
- 3 – Wilson Rosario Moreyra (2019, 2021, 2022)

Most wins by a trainer:

- 3 – Juan Carlos Etchechoury (1991, 1992, 2004)
- 3 – María Fernanda Álvarez (2019, 2020, 2023)

Most wins by an owner:

- 2 – Stud Matty (1991, 1999)
- 2 – Stud Las Telas (1996, 1997)
- 2 – Haras La Quebrada (2001, 2005)

Most wins by a breeder:

- 7 – Haras La Quebrada (1996, 1999, 2001, 2005, 2006, 2012, 2016)
- 6 – Haras Vacación (1994, 1997, 2000, 2002, 2017, 2023)
- 3 – Haras La Biznaga (1997, 1999, 2007)
- 3 – Haras Firmamento (2018, 2020, 2021)

== Winners ==
Year	Winner	Jockey	Trainer	Owner	Breeder	Group	Surface	Track	Time	Margin	Ref
2026	November Rain	Brian Rodrigo Enrique	Franco Gastón Retamoso	Stud Juanfran	Cria La Repatriada	III	Turf	Hipódromo de San Isidro	:57.41	Nose	
2025	Campo Verde	Juan Cruz Villagra	Miguel Ángel Cafere	Stud Mamina	Haras El Paraíso	III	Dirt	Hipódromo Argentino de Palermo	:56.65	2 1/2 lengths	
2024	Amor del Bueno	Brian Rodrigo Enrique	Rodrigo G. Baglietto	Stud Santo Domingo	Haras El Paraíso	III	Turf	Hipódromo de San Isidro	:59.39	1/2 neck	
2023	Ser Sincero	F. Fernandes Gonçalves	María Fernanda Álvarez	Stud J.A.	Haras Vacacion	III	Turf	Hipódromo de San Isidro	:55.88	5 lengths	
2022	Labrado	Wilson Rosario Moreyra	Ángel Natividad Bonetto	Stud Don Ariel	Haras El Paraíso	III	Dirt	Hipódromo Argentino de Palermo	:55.31	11 lengths	
2021	Hit It Dubai	Wilson Rosario Moreyra	Ángel Omar Álvarez	Stud Los Bandidos	Haras Firmamento	III	Dirt	Hipódromo Argentino de Palermo	:55.24	1/2 length	
2020	Splendid Key	Facundo Marcelo Coria	María Fernanda Álvarez	Haras El Alfalfar	Haras Firmamento	III	Dirt	Hipódromo Argentino de Palermo	:54.63	1 1/2 lengths	
2019	Calzonetti	Wilson Rosario Moreyra	María Fernanda Álvarez	Stud El Clan Corrientes	Haras La Pasión	III	Dirt	Hipódromo Argentino de Palermo	:54.97	1/2 length	
2018	Brilliant Sun Van	Juan Carlos Noriega	Rubén Alejandro Quiroga	Haras Marías del Sur	Haras Firmamento	III	Dirt	Hipódromo Argentino de Palermo	:55.64	1/2 length	
2017	Tan Creído	Julio César Méndez	Juan Carlos Cima	Stud Ximena	Haras Vacacion	III	Turf	Hipódromo de San Isidro	:56.43	6 lengths	
2016	Don Mengano	Osvaldo Adrián Alderete	Elvio Ramon Bortulé	Stud Jet Set	Haras La Quebrada	Listed	Dirt	Hipódromo Argentino de Palermo	:55.06	1 length	
2015	Sassagoula Springs ƒ	Eduardo Ortega Pavón	Claudio J. Sumpf Marcelo	Heritage Stud	Heritage Bloodstock	Listed	Turf	Hipódromo de San Isidro	:56.59	1 length	
2014	Feel the Race ƒ	Pablo Gustavo Falero	Carlos D. Etchechoury	Haras Santa Maria de Araras	Haras Santa Maria de Araras	Listed	Dirt	Hipódromo Argentino de Palermo	:54.63	Neck	
2013	Kir Royal	Damián Ramella	Nicolás Martín Ferro	Stud Santa Anita	Haras La Leyenda de Areco	Listed	Turf	Hipódromo de San Isidro	:56.02	2 lengths	
2012	Fresher	Jorge Antonio Ricardo	Ángel Natividad Bonetto	Stud Gringo Esteban	Haras La Quebrada	Listed	Dirt	Hipódromo Argentino de Palermo	:54.98	1/2 length	
2011	Benefactor	Jorge Gustavo Ruíz Díaz	Miguel Ángel B. Medina	Stud El Pulpo	Haras El Mallín	Ungraded	Turf	Hipódromo de San Isidro	1:00.20	1/2 neck	
2010	Race not run										
2009	Race not run										
2008	Mediatico Jet	Lujan José Giorgis Abel	Carlos A. Santiñaque	Haras Divisadero	Haras Divisadero	I	Dirt	Hipódromo Argentino de Palermo	:55.10	4 lengths	
2007	Greco Tom	José Ricardo Méndez	Daniel C. Martínez	Stud Mi Sueño	Haras La Biznaga	I	Turf	Hipódromo de San Isidro	:55.25	Neck	
2006	Rufus	Gustavo E. Calvente	Eduardo Nestor Siele	Ana Ruth	Haras La Quebrada	I	Dirt	Hipódromo Argentino de Palermo	:53.06	Neck	
2005	Alert	Pablo Gustavo Falero	Edmundo I. Rodríguez	Haras La Quebrada	Haras La Quebrada	I	Turf	Hipódromo de San Isidro	:55.20	1/2 length	
2004	Queleden Candela ƒ	Fabio H. Guedes Arocena	Juan Carlos Etchechoury	Haras de la Pomme	Haras de la Pomme	I	Dirt	Hipódromo Argentino de Palermo	:55.20	1 length	
2003	Asset	Jorge Valdivieso	Pablo Pedro Sahagian	Stud Suerte Loca	A. Vargas Lerena	I	Turf	Hipódromo de San Isidro	:59.10	6 lengths	
2002	Chollo	Jacinto R. Herrera	Roberto Pellegatta	Stud Bingo Horse	Haras Vacacion	I	Dirt	Hipódromo Argentino de Palermo	:55.91	1/2 head	
2001	Refine ƒ	Jacinto R. Herrera	Carlos Alberto Zarlengo	Haras La Quebrada	Haras La Quebrada	I	Turf	Hipódromo de San Isidro	:55.04	9 lengths	
2000	Mister Phone	Pablo Gustavo Falero	Anibal E. Giovanetti	Stud Five and Me	Haras Vacacion	I	Dirt	Hipódromo Argentino de Palermo	:53.88	7 lengths	
1999	Sun Spring ƒ	Jacinto R. Herrera	Edurdo M. Martínez de Hoz	Stud Matty	Haras La Quebrada	I	Turf	Hipódromo de San Isidro	:54.68	6 lengths	
1998	Montañez Tom	Juan Carlos Noriega	Roberto A. Pellegatta	Stud Las P.V.T.	Haras La Biznaga	I	Dirt	Hipódromo Argentino de Palermo	:56.79	2 lengths	
1997	Cutlas	Francisco Arreguy	Juan A. Colucho	Stud Las Telas	Haras Vacacion	I	Dirt	Hipódromo Argentino de Palermo	:56.30	2 lengths	
1996	Astrologica ƒ	Francisco Arreguy	Raúl Hugo Yalet	Stud Las Telas	Haras La Quebrada	I	Dirt	Hipódromo Argentino de Palermo	:55.86	1/2 head	
1995	Makaha ƒ	Pablo Gustavo Falero	Jorge A. Mayansky Neer	Stud Sueño Posible	Haras El Alfalfar	I	Dirt	Hipódromo Argentino de Palermo	:55.8	1 1/2 lengths	
1994	Leyden	Horacio E. Karamanos	Andio Noguera	Stud San Blas	Haras Vacacion	I	Turf	Hipódromo de San Isidro	:56.8	Head	
1993	Bolero Toss	Jorge Valdivieso	Roberto M. Bullrich	Haras La Biznaga	Haras La Biznaga	I	Turf	Hipódromo de San Isidro	:58.0	1/2 neck	
1992	El Barón	Jorge Valdivieso	Juan Carlos Etchechoury	Stud Santa Maria de Giles	Haras El Turf	I	Turf	Hipódromo de San Isidro	:58.8	4 lengths	
1991	Gold Spring	Jacinto R. Herrera	Juan Carlos Etchechoury	Stud Matty	Haras Las Matildes	I	Turf	Hipódromo de San Isidro	:57.8		

ƒ indicates a filly
