= Gran Premio Estrellas Juvenile =

Group 1 horse race in Argentina

- Class: Group 1
- Inaugurated: 1991

Race information
- Distance: 1600 meters
- Surface: Varies
- Track: Hipódromo de San Isidro or Hipódromo Argentino de Palermo
- Qualification: Two-year-old males
- Purse: $80,000,000 ARS (2026); 1st: $50,000,000 ARS

The Gran Premio Estrellas Juvenile (also known as the Gran Premio Estrellas Potrillos) is a Group 1 horse race in Argentina that is part of the Carreras de las Estrellas and is open to two-year-old males. It is run over a distance of 1600 metres (0.99 mi) either on the turf at Hipódromo de San Isidro or on the dirt at the Hipódromo Argentino de Palermo.

== History ==
The Gran Premio Estrellas Juvenile, along with the Gran Premio Estrellas Juvenile Fillies and Gran Premio Estrellas Junior Sprint, was one of the inaugural races of the Carreras de las Estrellas. It was originally run under the name of the Gran Premio Estrellas Potrillos and over a distance of 1500 meters (lengthened to its current distance of 1600 meters the following year). The Gran Premio Estrellas Juvenile was inspired by the Breeders' Cup Juvenile.

In 2023, the Gran Premio Estrellas Juvenile, along with the Gran Premio Estrellas Juvenile Fillies and Clásico Estrellas Junior Sprint, began to be run the day before the rest of the Carreras de las Estrellas.

Many winners of the Gran Premio Estrellas Juvenile have gone on to be named the Argentine Champion Two-Year-Old Colt, including Team (also named Horse of the Year), Suggestive Boy, Ivar, and Subsanador.

== Records ==
Speed record:

- 1600 meters (current distance): 1:33.10 – San Livinus (2009)
- 1500 meters: 1:28.6 – Intérprete (1991)

Greatest winning margin:

- 7 lengths – Dark Love (2023)

Most wins by a jockey:

- 5 – Eduardo Ortega Pavón (2010, 2013, 2014, 2022, 2023)
- 4 – Pablo Gustavo Falero (2000, 2003, 2004, 2009)

Most wins by a trainer:

- 5 – Alfredo F. Gaitán Dassié (2005, 2011, 2013, 2014, 2016)
- 3 – Roberto M. Bullrich (1996, 2017, 2020)

Most wins by an owner:

- 2 – Stud Rincón de Piedra (2004, 2008)
- 2 – Haras Cachagua (2013, 2014)
- 2 – Stud Triunvirato (2017, 2020)

Most wins by a breeder:

- 7 – Haras Abolengo (1991, 1992, 2006, 2008, 2010, 2013, 2014)
- 3 – Haras La Quebrada (1994, 1998, 2009)
- 3 – Haras La Biznaga (1996, 2004, 2020)
- 3 – Haras de la Pomme (1997, 1999, 2007)

== Winners ==
Year	Winner	Jockey	Trainer	Owner	Breeder	Distance	Surface	Track	Time	Margin	Ref
2026	Colorado Del Monte	Gustavo E. Calvente	Enrique Martín Ferro	Stud Facundito	Haras El Paraiso	1600 meters	Turf	Hipódromo de San Isidro	1:36.23	4 lengths	
2025	Drive Joy	Martín Javier Valle	Carlos D. Etchechoury	Haras Firmamento	Haras Firmamento	1600 meters	Dirt	Hipódromo Argentino de Palermo	1:35.07	1 1/2 lengths	
2024	Colifato Novo	Joaquín Alberto Cano	Ricardo González	Stud El Ranquel	Maximiliano Marcelo Conti	1600 meters	Turf	Hipódromo de San Isidro	1:36.25	1/2 neck	
2023	Dark Love	Eduardo Ortega Pavón	Enrique Martín Ferro	Stud San Isidoro	Matías Uher & Gustavo Uher Navarro	1600 meters	Turf	Hipódromo de San Isidro	1:34.18	7 lengths	
2022	Subsanador	Eduardo Ortega Pavón	Nicolás Martín Ferro	Stud Facundito	Haras El Mallín	1600 meters	Dirt	Hipódromo Argentino de Palermo	1:33.94	2 1/2 lengths	
2021	Fiel Amigo	Rodrio G. Blanco	Darío César Periga	Stud El 30	Hara Santa Inés	1600 meters	Dirt	Hipódromo Argentino de Palermo	1:34.24	1 1/2 lengths	
2020	Seteado Joy	Fabricio Raúl Barroso	Roberto M. Bullrich	Stud Triunvirato	Haras La Biznaga	1600 meters	Dirt	Hipódromo Argentino de Palermo	1:33.47	Neck	
2019	Ivar	Adrián M. Giannetti	Juan Manuel Etchechoury	Stud Haras Rio Dois Irmaos	Stud Haras Rio Dois Irmaos	1600 meters	Dirt	Hipódromo Argentino de Palermo	1:33.20	6 lengths	
2018	Grecko	Gustavo E. Calvente	Roberto Pellegatta	Juan Antonio	Haras La Pasion	1600 meters	Dirt	Hipódromo Argentino de Palermo	1:34.01	3 lengths	
2017	Puerto Real	Fabricio Raúl Barroso	Roberto M. Bullrich	Stud Triunvirato	Haras Carampangue	1600 meters	Turf	Hipódromo de San Isidro	1:38.03	3 lengths	
2016	Sweet Sorrel	Nicolás Darío García	Alfredo F. Gaitán Dassié	Haras Futuro	Haras Futuro	1600 meters	Dirt	Hipódromo Argentino de Palermo	1:33.68	4 lengths	
2015	Urmeneta	Cristián F. Quiles	Humberto J. Benesperi	Stud Ciencias Ocultas	Haras Cachagua & Haras Pozo de Luna	1600 meters	Turf	Hipódromo de San Isidro	1:34.34	Head	
2014	Galicado	Eduardo Ortega Pavón	Alfredo F. Gaitán Dassié	Haras Cachagua	Haras Abolengo	1600 meters	Dirt	Hipódromo Argentino de Palermo	1:34.45	2 1/2 lengths	
2013	Got Talent	Eduardo Ortega Pavón	Alfredo F. Gaitán Dassié	Haras Cachagua	Haras Abolengo	1600 meters	Turf	Hipódromo de San Isidro	1:33.81	1 length	
2012	Indy Point	Gonzalo Hahn	Raúl Alberto Ramallo	Stud Gus-May-Fer	Felipe Lovisi	1600 meters	Dirt	Hipódromo Argentino de Palermo	1:33.43	3 lengths	
2011	Suggestive Boy	Jorge Antonio Ricardo	Alfredo F. Gaitán Dassié	Haras Pozo de Luna	Haras Futuro	1600 meters	Turf	Hipódromo de San Isidro	1:38.37	1/2 neck	
2010	Paulinho	Eduardo Ortega Pavón	Roberto A. Pellegatta	Stud Los Cozacos	Haras Abolengo	1600 meters	Dirt	Hipódromo Argentino de Palermo	1:35.24	6 lengths	
2009	San Livinus	Pablo Gustavo Falero	Carlos D. Etchechoury	Stud Tres Jotas	Haras La Quebrada	1600 meters	Turf	Hipódromo de San Isidro	1:33.10	2 lengths	
2008	Ever Peace	Marios Luis Leyes	Rosana M. San Millán	Stud Rincón de Piedra	Haras Abolengo	1600 meters	Dirt	Hipódromo Argentino de Palermo	1:34.63	1/2 length	
2007	Mach Glory	Julio César Méndez	Carlos D. Etchechoury	Stud S. de B.	Haras de la Pomme	1600 meters	Turf	Hipódromo de San Isidro	1:33.43	2 lengths	
2006	Spice Boy	José Ricardo Méndez	Jorge A. Mayansky Neer	Stud Doña Helga	Haras Abolengo	1600 meters	Dirt	Hipódromo Argentino de Palermo	1:34.31	5 lengths	
2005	El Fanfante	José Ricardo Méndez	Alfredo F. Gaitán Dassié	Stud Las Hormigas	Haras Las Camelias	1600 meters	Turf	Hipódromo de San Isidro	1:33.70	1/2 length	
2004	Forty Mirage	Pablo Gustavo Falero	Federico Aranaga	Stud Rincón de Piedra	Haras La Biznaga	1600 meters	Dirt	Hipódromo Argentino de Palermo	1:34.13	4 lengths	
2003	Emergente	Pablo Gustavo Falero	Juan Carlos Maldotti	Stud Bingo Horse	Haras Vacacion	1600 meters	Turf	Hipódromo de San Isidro	1:37.50	2 lengths	
2002	Freddy	Fabián Antonio Rivero	José Martins Alves	Haras La Providencia	Haras La Providencia	1600 meters	Dirt	Hipódromo Argentino de Palermo	1:35.41	4 lengths	
2001	Petit Club	Juan Carlos Noriega	Roberto Pellegatta	Stornerside Stable	Haras Orilla del Monte	1600 meters	Turf	Hipódromo de San Isidro	1:33.15	4 lengths	
2000	Rocking Trick	Pablo Gustavo Falero	Juan Carlos Maldotti	Haras Vacacion	Haras Vacacion	1600 meters	Dirt	Hipódromo Argentino de Palermo	1:38.37	Neck	
1999	Painter	Cardenas E. Talaverano	Juan Carlos Etchechoury	Haras de la Pomme	Haras de la Pomme	1600 meters	Turf	Hipódromo de San Isidro	1:33.28	1/2 neck	
1998	Team	Francisco Arreguy	Juan A. Colucho	Stud Las Telas	Haras La Quebrada	1600 meters	Dirt	Hipódromo Argentino de Palermo	1:34.53	6 lengths	
1997	Lord Grillo	Juan Carlos Noriega	Roberto A. Pellegatta	Stud La Tinuca	Haras de la Pomme	1600 meters	Dirt	Hipódromo Argentino de Palermo	1:36.50	3/4 length	
1996	Refinado Tom	Jorge Valdivieso	Roberto M. Bullrich	Haras La Biznaga	Haras La Biznaga	1600 meters	Dirt	Hipódromo Argentino de Palermo	1:34.85	5 lengths	
1995	Muñecote	Jacinto R. Herrera	Jorge Luis Viego	Stud La Verdad	Haras El Turf	1600 meters	Dirt	Hipódromo Argentino de Palermo	1:35.13	Head	
1994	Rockville	Guillermo E. Sena	Humberto J. Benesperi	Stud La Fia-CCA	Haras La Quebrada	1600 meters	Turf	Hipódromo de San Isidro	1:35.6	1 1/2 lengths	
1993	Tamarjín	Omar Ilarione	Juan C. Baratucci	Stud Don Carlos	Haras El Candil	1600 meters	Turf	Hipódromo de San Isidro	1:36.2	Neck	
1992	Valenti	Jacinto R. Herrera	Juan Carlos Etchechoury	Stud La Angostura	Haras Abolengo	1600 meters	Turf	Hipódromo de San Isidro	1:37.6	3/4 length	
1991	Intérprete	Walter Hugo Serrudo	Santillán G. Frenkel	Stud La Magdalena	Haras Abolengo	1500 meters	Turf	Hipódromo de San Isidro	1:28.6	1/2 neck	
