= Gran Premio Estrellas Distaff =

Group 1 horse race in Argentina

- Class: Group 1
- Inaugurated: 1993

Race information
- Distance: 1800 meters
- Surface: Varies
- Track: Hipódromo de San Isidro or Hipódromo Argentino de Palermo
- Qualification: Fillies and mares three-years-old and up
- Purse: $92,000,000 ARS (2026); 1st: $62,000,000 ARS

The Gran Premio Estrellas Distaff - Copa Señor Alejandro J. Menditeguy is a Group 1 horse race that is part of the Carreras de las Estrellas and is open to fillies and mares three years old or older. It is run over a distance of 1800 metres (1.1 mi) either on the turf at Hipódromo de San Isidro or on the dirt at the Hipódromo Argentino de Palermo.

== History ==
The Gran Premio Estrellas Distaff was added to the Carreras de las Estrellas in its third year, 1993. It was inaugurated as a Group One race. It was inspired by the Breeders' Cup Distaff.

In 2010, Ollagua became the first, and as of 2026, only, horse to win the Gran Premio Estrellas Distaff twice.

In 2023, the Gran Premio Estrellas Distaff became the ninth race in Belleza de Arteaga's nine-race win streak, and her third consecutive Group 1 victory.

In 2024, the distance of the Gran Premio Estrellas Distaff was reduced from 2000 meters to 1800 meters, more in line with its North American inspiration.

In 2024, the Gran Premio Estrellas Distaff had the largest purse of the Carreras de las Estrellas races.

== Records ==
Speed record:

- 1800 meters (current distance): 1:48.17 – Hawaiian Love (2024)
- 2000 meters: 1:57.87 – Miss Serendipity (2013)

Greatest winning margin:

- 5 lengths – Overspeed (1993), Guernika (2001), & Cita Di Rio (2020)

Most wins:

- 2 – Ollagua (2009, 2010)

Most wins by a jockey:

- 4 – Jacinto R. Herrera (1993, 1998, 1999, 2001)
- 3 – Jorge Valdivieso (1995, 1996, 1997)
- 3 – Pablo Gustavo Falero (2002, 2008, 2012)
- 3 – Juan Carlos Noriega (2003, 2006, 2021)
- 3 – F. Fernandes Gonçalves (2018, 2022, 2024)

Most wins by a trainer:

- 3 – Juan Carlos Etchechoury (1996, 2007, 2013, 2017, 2018)
- 3 – Roberto Pellegatta (2003, 2006, 2023)
- 3 – Juan Bautista Udaondo (2008, 2015, 2016)
- 3 – José Martins Alve (2009, 2010, 2011)

Most wins by an owner:

- 3 – Haras Vacación (2008, 2012, 2017)
- 3 – Haras La Providencia (2009, 2010, 2011)

Most wins by a breeder:

- 3 – Haras La Quebrada (1993, 2000, 2001)
- 3 – Haras Firmamento (2006, 2007, 2018)
- 3 – Haras Vacación (2008, 2012, 2017)
- 3 – Haras La Providencia (2009, 2010, 2011)

== Winners ==
Year	Winner	Age	Jockey	Trainer	Owner	Breeder	Distance	Surface	Track	Time	Margin	Ref
2026	Indiana Candy	3	William Pereyra	Juan Franco Saldivia	Stud Crazy Adrian	Haras La Esperanza	1800 meters	Turf	Hipódromo de San Isidro	1:50.04	3 lengths	
2025	Coni Fizz	3	Jairo Emanuel Flores	José Cristóbal Blanco	Haras La Generacion	Haras La Generacion	1800 meters	Dirt	Hipódromo Argentino de Palermo	1:49.14	Neck	
2024	Hawaiian Love	4	F. Fernandes Gonçalves	Pablo Pedro Sahagián	Stud Montiel	Haras El Mallin	1800 meters	Turf	Hipódromo de San Isidro	1:48.17	1 1/2 lengths	
2023	Belleza de Arteaga	5	William Pereyra	Roberto Pellegatta	Stud Chos Malal	Haras Bioart	2000 meters	Turf	Hipódromo de San Isidro	2:00.86	2 1/2 lengths	
2022	Soviet Catch	4	F. Fernandes Gonçalves	Agustín Pavlovsky	Haras Carampangue	Haras Carampangue	2000 meters	Dirt	Hipódromo Argentino de Palermo	2:01.50	1/2 length	
2021	Mahogonny	3	Juan Carlos Noriega	Juan Franco Saldivia	Stud La Leyenda	Haras La Leyenda de Areco	2000 meters	Dirt	Hipódromo Argentino de Palermo	1:59.95	3/4 length	
2020	Cita Di Rio	4	Martín Javier Valle	Marcos Lautaro Roberti	Haras Santa Elena	Haras Santa Elena	2000 meters	Dirt	Hipódromo Argentino de Palermo	2:00.25	5 lengths	
2019	La Renoleta	3	Juan Cruz Villagra	Javier Alejandro Fren	Stud Garabo	Juan Antonio	2000 meters	Dirt	Hipódromo Argentino de Palermo	1:59.10	3 lengths	
2018	Adora Nistel	5	F. Fernandes Gonçalves	Juan Carlos Etchechoury	Haras Firmamento	Haras Firmamento	2000 meters	Dirt	Hipódromo Argentino de Palermo	2:02.75	2 1/2 lengths	
2017	Schoolmistress	3	José A. Da Silva	Juan Carlos Etchechoury	Haras Vacacion	Haras Vacacion	2000 meters	Turf	Hipódromo de San Isidro	2:04.52	3 1/2 lengths	
2016	Kiriaki	3	Gustavo E. Calvente	Juan Bautista Udaondo	Haras Santa Inés	Haras Santa Inés	2000 meters	Dirt	Hipódromo Argentino de Palermo	2:00.85	4 lengths	
2015	Kalithea	3	Gustavo E. Calvente	Juan Bautista Udaondo	Haras Santa Inés	Haras Santa Inés	2000 meters	Turf	Hipódromo de San Isidro	2:03.53	1/2 head	
2014	Mary's Gold	3	Jorge Antonio Ricardo	Enrique Juan Sauro	Stud Rubio B.	Haras Abolengo	2000 meters	Dirt	Hipódromo Argentino de Palermo	2:00.18	1 1/2 lengths	
2013	Miss Serendipity	4	Jorge Antonio Ricardo	Juan Carlos Etchechoury	Stud San Maluc	Anselmo Cavalieri	2000 meters	Turf	Hipódromo de San Isidro	1:57.87	4 lengths	
2012	Kali Baby	3	Pablo Gustavo Falero	Juan Sebastián Maldotti	Haras Vacacion	Haras Vacacion	2000 meters	Dirt	Hipódromo Argentino de Palermo	2:00.72	1 length	
2011	Jumbalaya	3	Altair Domingos	José Martins Alve	Haras La Providencia	Haras La Providencia	2000 meters	Turf	Hipódromo de San Isidro	2:06.88	3 1/2 lengths	
2010	Ollagua	4	Altair Domingos	José Martins Alve	Haras La Providencia	Haras La Providencia	2000 meters	Dirt	Hipódromo Argentino de Palermo	2:01.77	1/2 length	
2009	Ollagua	3	Francisco R. Corrales	José Martins Alve	Haras La Providencia	Haras La Providencia	2000 meters	Turf	Hipódromo de San Isidro	1:58.09	4 lengths	
2008	Filarmonia	4	Pablo Gustavo Falero	Juan Bautista Udaondo	Haras Vacacion	Haras Vacacion	2000 meters	Dirt	Hipódromo Argentino de Palermo	2:02.16	1 length	
2007	Cachorra Wells	4	Damián Ramella	Juan Carlos Etchechoury	Haras Firmamento	Haras Firmamento	2000 meters	Turf	Hipódromo de San Isidro	1:59.74	Neck	
2006	Miss Atorranta	3	Juan Carlos Noriega	Roberto Pellegatta	Stud Le Fragole	Haras Firmamento	2000 meters	Dirt	Hipódromo Argentino de Palermo	2:02.76	1/2 head	
2005	Tamariu	3	Pedro Roberto Robles	Alfredo Emilio Mihura	Stud Cadaques	Lagos Marmol & Marull	2000 meters	Turf	Hipódromo de San Isidro	1:59.79	1/2 length	
2004	Artemisa	5	Julio César Méndez	Juan Carlos Maldotti	Stud Tres Jotas	Juan J. Caligiuri	2000 meters	Dirt	Hipódromo Argentino de Palermo	2:04.34	1/2 head	
2003	Potra Fabulous	3	Juan Carlos Noriega	Roberto Pellegatta	Stud Cris-Fer	Haras La Madrugada	2000 meters	Turf	Hipódromo de San Isidro	2:04.46	2 lengths	
2002	Tanganyika	4	Pablo Gustavo Falero	Juan Carlos Maldotti	Stud Los Patrios	Haras El Paraíso	2000 meters	Dirt	Hipódromo Argentino de Palermo	2:05.61	4 lengths	
2001	Guernika	3	Jacinto R. Herrera	Juan A. Colucho	Haras La Quebrada	Haras La Quebrada	2000 meters	Turf	Hipódromo de San Isidro	2:00.17	5 lengths	
2000	Mi Sureña	3	Pedro Roberto Robles	Domingo Elias Pascual	Stud Bonaventura	Haras La Quebrada	2000 meters	Dirt	Hipódromo Argentino de Palermo	2:05.43	3 lengths	
1999	Warllon	3	Jacinto R. Herrera	Diego Peña	Stud Tori	Haras La Madrugada	2000 meters	Turf	Hipódromo de San Isidro	1:59.43	1/2 head	
1998	Voy Afuera	3	Jacinto R. Herrera	Leonardo F. Antognozzi	Stud Arcángel	Haras Don Arcángel	2000 meters	Dirt	Hipódromo Argentino de Palermo	2:03.36	DQ	
1997	Blue Baby Blue	3	Jorge Valdivieso	Domingo Elias Pascual	Haras Santa Maria de Araras	Haras Santa Maria de Araras	2000 meters	Dirt	Hipódromo Argentino de Palermo	2:04.24	2 1/2 lengths	
1996	Jugada Toss	3	Jorge Valdivieso	Juan Carlos Etchechoury	Haras La Biznaga	Haras La Biznaga	2000 meters	Dirt	Hipódromo Argentino de Palermo	2:02.37	2 1/2 lengths	
1995	Romanza Mora	3	Jorge Valdivieso	Ever W. Perdomo	Haras Los Moros	Haras Los Moros	2000 meters	Dirt	Hipódromo Argentino de Palermo	2:00.83	1 length	
1994	Tutor Girl	4	Edgardo Gramática	César Augusto Garat	Haras Don Santiago	Haras Don Santiago	2000 meters	Turf	Hipódromo de San Isidro	2:01.0	2 1/2 lengths	
1993	Overspeed	4	Jacinto R. Herrera	Ignacio Correas	Stud Meli	Haras La Quebrada	2000 meters	Turf	Hipódromo de San Isidro	1:59.4	5 lengths	
