= Refinado Tom =

Argentinian-bred thoroughbred racehorse

- Sire: Shy Tom
- Grandsire: Blushing Groom
- Dam: Ma Raffine
- Damsire: Mountdrago
- Sex: Stallion
- Foaled: August 28, 1993
- Died: December 9, 2019
- Country: Argentina
- Colour: Chestnut
- Breeder: Haras La Biznaga
- Owner: Haras La Biznaga
- Record: 26: 10-1-4
- Earnings: USD$857,181

Major wins
- Gran Premio Raúl y Raúl E. Chevalier (1996) Gran Premio Estrellas Juvenile (1996); Polla de Potrillos (1996); Gran Premio Jockey Club (1996); Gran Premio Nacional (1996); Native Diver Handicap (1997); Gran Premio Benito Villanueva (1999); Gran Premio Estrellas Classic (1999) Gran Premio Italia (1999)

Awards
- Argentinian Horse of the Year (1996) Argentinian Champion Two-Year-Old Colt (1996); Argentinian Champion Three-Year-Old Colt (1996); Argentinian Champion Older Horse (1996); Argentinian Champion Stayer (1996) Argentinian Triple Crown (1996)

Refinado Tom (28 August 1993 – 9 December 2019) was an Argentinian thoroughbred racehorse who won the Argentinian Triple Crown in 1996.

He was later cloned for breeding polo ponies.

== Background ==
Refinado Tom was a chestnut stallion with a star and an off-center snip, bred by Haras La Biznaga, one of the most famous and historic farms in Argentina. He was foaled in the early morning of August 28, 1993.

Shy Tom, Refinado Tom's sire, was a multiple graded stakes winner in the United States, where he was bred. He won the Grade 3 Baltimore Budweiser Breeders' Cup Handicap, Grade 3 Salvator Mile Handicap, and Grade 3 Gulfstream Park Budweiser Breeders' Cup Handicap. In December 1991, he was exported to stand stud in Argentina at Haras La Biznaga, starting the 1992 breeding season. Refinado Tom was part of his first crop and would be his most successful offspring.

Refinado Tom's dam, Ma Raffine, was bred and campaigned by Haras La Biznaga. She won one of twelve races before being retired. Refinado Tom was her second foal. She came from a classic family known for performing well in long races.

Haras La Biznaga normally sold all of the colts they bred, but Refinado Tom was retained due to a lack of interest from potential buyers.

Refinado Tom was trained by Roberto M. Bullrich and ridden by Jorge Valdivieso during his Argentinian campaigns.

Refinado Tom was well-built, with the physique of a sprinter. He had a large rump, big muscles, and a wide forehead. He was said to look more like an American Quarter Horse than a thoroughbred. Refinado Tom was unfriendly and had a poor temperament, such that Bullrich was unable to get close to him to saddle him on race days and he needed to be saddled outside of stalls so he wouldn't kick. He performed poorly in morning workouts, but ran much better in afternoon races.

== Racing career ==
=== Two-year-old season (1995/1996) ===
When Refinado Tom entered training, he didn't show much promise. He failed to impress in his debut on February 25, 1996, finishing fourth in a 1200-meter maiden race at Hipódromo Argentino de Palermo. He ran again in another maiden race on March 17, and this time ran much better, impressing trainer Roberto "Coco" Bullrich, who said that he was surprised at how quickly Refinado Tom had become competitive and that it was as if the colt had figured out "what this racing thing was about".

Refinado Tom was then pointed to stakes races, with his next start being in the Group 1 Gran Premio Raúl y Raúl E. Chevalier, a 1400-meter turf race at Hipódromo de San Isidro. He won the race, squeezing between the frontrunner and the rail to take the lead and win decisively.

Refinado Tom was made the heavy favorite for the Group 1 Gran Criterium, run over 1600 meters a month later at the same track. He developed an allergic reaction in the days leading up to the race, although continued training normally. Juan Ithuralde, the manager of Haras La Biznaga, and Bullrich argued over whether or not to run Refinado Tom in the race. In the Gran Criterium itself, Refinado Tom ran poorly, finishing third, leading to concerns about his ability to handle longer distances.

Refinado Tom's allergic reaction cleared up in the following three weeks, in time for the Group 1 Carreras de las Estrellas Juvenile at Hipódromo Argentino de Palermo, the last race of Refinado Tom's two-year-old season. Due to his defeat in the Gran Criterium, Refinado Tom was not the favorite for the race, but he ran to his usual standards to win by several lengths.

=== Three-year-old season (1996/1997) ===
Refinado Tom's three-year-old season opened with the Group 1 Gran Premio Polla de Potrillos, the first leg of the Argentinian Triple Crown, run over 1600 meters on the dirt at Hipódromo Argentino de Palermo, like the Carreras de las Estrellas Juvenile. There was a lot of rain leading up to the race, and it was rainy the day of the race as well. It was to be Refinado Tom's first run on an off track. Refinado Tom ran off the lead until jockey Jorge Valdivieso let him go, at which point Refinado Tom passed the frontrunners to take the lead 300 meters from the finish line. Refinado Tom drew away from the field to win by nine lengths, with Valdivieso later calling it the chestnut's easiest win.

It rained prior to the second leg of the Triple Crown as well, the Group 1 Gran Premio Jockey Club, a 2000-meter race on the turf at Hipódromo de San Isidro. Hopes were high for Refinado Tom, and he ran as expected, taking the lead in the stretch from Alpino Fitz to finish first by a length and a half. La Nación praised his performance, saying that Refinado Tom was on the road to have his name occupy a principal place in the history of the Argentinian turf.

The third and final leg of the Argentinian Triple Crown, the Group 1 Gran Premio Nacional, was Refinado Tom's next race. Despite some concerns over its 2500-meter length, many expected Refinado Tom to win the race and the Triple Crown. Refinado Tom seemed uncomfortable for much of the race, and spent a good portion of the race in the middle of the pack behind the frontrunning Alpino Fitz. In the stretch, Alpino Fitz tired and drifted to the outside, where Refinado Tom was coming up alongside him, pushing Refinado Tom out towards the center of the track. Jorge Valdivieso had to correct abruptly, avoiding touching Alpino Fitz while maintaining Refinado Tom's space. Refinado Tom passed Alpino Fitz to take the lead, but was starting to tire when Funny Toy made a late bid. Refinado Tom turned back the challenge, winning "by sheer arrogance" by a neck.

After the race, during a celebration party, Refinado Tom was examined by the veterinarian and turned up lame. He was loaded on a truck to go to the farm in San Isidro, where ultrasounds would uncover a tear in his left shoulder. Refinado Tom had to skip the Group 1 Gran Premio Carlos Pellegrini, the final leg of the Argentinian Quadruple Crown, while recovering. His owners decided to send him to the United States to run when he was fully recovered. On March 20, 1997, Refinado Tom was exported to the United States.

For his 1996 campaign, Refinado Tom was named the Argentinian Horse of the Year, Champion Two-Year-Old Male, Champion Three-Year-Old Male, Champion Stayer, and Champion Older Horse (despite not racing as an older horse that year).

=== Four-year-old season (1997/1998) ===
In the United States, Refinado Tom returned to training in the care of Richard Mandella. Refinado Tom continued to receive therapeutic work on his shoulder injury. Mandella trained Refinado Tom to be better prepared at the start of a race.

Refinado Tom started as the favorite in his first three races in the United States, the ungraded Wickerr Handicap, the Grade 3 William P. Kyne Handicap, and the listed Arcangues Handicap, all run in California. He failed to perform well in any of them, finishing seventh, third, and fifth, respectively.

Despite his losses, Refinado Tom was still fairly well regarded and started as the second choice in his fourth American start, the Grade 3 Native Diver Handicap. In the race, Refinado Tom ran in the second position before taking the lead to win by seven lengths. Jockey Gary Stevens compared Refinado Tom's acceleration to that of Gentlemen, another Argentinian import, on whom he had won the race the previous year in a record-setting performance.

Refinado Tom then ran third in the Grade 2 San Antonio Handicap, sixth in the Grade 3 New Orleans Handicap, and failed to finish in the Grade 2 San Bernardino Handicap, his last race as a four-year-old.

=== Five-year-old season (1998/1999) ===
Six months after not finishing in the San Bernardino Handicap, Refinado Tom ran again in his first race as a five-year-old in an allowance race at Santa Anita on October 14, 1998. He finished fourth in the six and a half furlong long turf race. He ran twice that November, in the ungraded Skywalker Handicap and listed Forty-Niner Handicap, again finishing fourth in both races.

In the 1998 International Classifications, Refinado Tom was rated at 110 lbs for the mile distance category (7-9 furlongs).

On February 26, 1999, Refinado Tom returned to Argentina, with plans to retire him to stud. Bullrich greeted him when the airplane landed, and Refinado Tom searched for his hand with the white chocolates that Bullrich regularly gave him.

Refinado Tom went through the usual quarantine and came out of it so well that the decision was made to postpone his retirement to stud and instead continue racing him. Bullrich noted that Refinado Tom came back from the United States with a better work ethic in the mornings.

In his first race back in Argentina, Refinado Tom won the Group 2 Gran Premio Benito Villanueva. He followed it up a month later with a win in the Group 1 Carreras de las Estrellas Classic. In the latter, he defeated Group 1 winners Coalsack, Flirteador, Magic Corner, Gold Fire, and Rubio First.

=== Six-year-old season (1999/2000) ===
Refinado Tom ran six times as a six-year-old, finishing first in the Group 3 Gran Premio Italia, second in the Group 1 Gran Premio General San Martin, and third in the Group 1 Gran Premio Copa de Oro.

== Race record ==
Date	Age	Distance	Surface	Race	Grade	Track	Odds	Field	Finish	Time	Winning (losing) magrin	Jockey	Ref
Feb 25,1996	2	1200 meters	Dirt	Premio Moda	Maiden	Hipódromo Argentino de Palermo	5.20	8	4	1:10.58	(9 3/4 lengths)	Jorge Valdivieso	
Mar 17, 1996	2	1400 meters	Dirt	Premio Payaso	Maiden	Hipódromo Argentino de Palermo	9.35	5	1	1:22.23	Head	Jorge Valdivieso	
May 4, 1996	2	1400 meters	Turf	Gran Premio Raúl y Raúl E. Chevalier	I	Hipódromo de San Isidro	5.35	11	1	1:20.96	6 lengths	Jorge Valdivieso	
Jun 8, 1996	2	1600 meters	Turf	Gran Criterium	I	Hipódromo de San Isidro	1.40*	10	3	1:33.71	(5 1/2 lengths)	Jorge Valdivieso	
Jun 29, 1996	2	1600 meters	Dirt	Gran Premio Estrellas Juvenile	I	Hipódromo Argentino de Palermo	5.25	11	1	1:34.85	5 lengths	Jorge Valdivieso	
Sep 7, 1996	3	1600 meters	Dirt	Gran Premio Polla de Potrillos	I	Hipódromo Argentino de Palermo	1.75*	14	1	1:34.59	9 lengths	Jorge Valdivieso	
Oct 5, 1996	3	2000 meters	Turf	Gran Premio Jockey Club	I	Hipódromo de San Isidro	1.75*	12	1	2:00.47	1 1/2 lengths	Jorge Valdivieso	
Nov 9,1996	3	2500 meters	Dirt	Gran Premio Nacional	I	Hipódromo Argentino de Palermo	1.55*	7	1	2:33.84	Neck	Jorge Valdivieso	
July 31, 1997	4	1 mile	Turf	Wickerr Handicap	Stakes	Del Mar	1.90*	7	7	1:36.60	(14 1/2 lengths)	Corey Nakatani	
Sep 27, 1997	4	1 1/8 mile	Dirt	William P. Kyne Handicap	III	Bay Meadows	1.30*	7	3	1:46.32	(1/4 length)	Gary Stevens	
Nov 16, 1997	4	1 1/16 mile	Dirt	Arcangues Handicap	Listed	Hollywood Park	1.60*	7	5	1:43.54	(10 1/2 lengths)	Chris McCarron	
Dec 21, 1997	4	1 1/8 mile	Dirt	Native Diver Handicap	III	Hollywood Park	2.20	8	1	1:47.84	7 lengths	Gary Stevens	
Feb 7, 1998	4	1 1/8 mile	Dirt	San Antonio Handicap	II	Santa Anita	4.40	5	3	1:47.60	(7 lengths)	Chris McCarron	
Mar 8, 1998	4	1 1/8 mile	Dirt	New Orleans Handicap	III	Fair Grounds	4.00	8	6	1:48.13	(10 lengths)	Gary Stevens	
Apr 11, 1998	4	1 1/8 mile	Dirt	San Bernardino Handicap	II	Santa Anita	10.70	10	DNF	1:48.48	N/a	José Valdivia Jr.	
Oct 14, 1998	5	6.5 furlongs	Turf	Allowance	Allowance	Santa Anita	9.30	7	4	1:14.97	(5 3/4 lengths)	Gary Stevens	
Nov 6,1998	5	1 mile	Dirt	Skywalker Handicap	Stakes	Santa Anita	2.70	7	4	1:35.41	(11 lengths)	David Flores	
Nov 27, 1998	5	1 1/16 mile	Dirt	Forty-Niner Handicap	Listed	Golden Gate Fields	6.40	5	4	1:42.00	(4 1/4 lengths)	Dennis Carr	
May 28, 1999	5	1600 meters	Dirt	Gran Premio Benito Villanueva	II	Hipódromo Argentino de Palermo	3.50	10	1	1:37.99	1 1/2 lengths	Jorge Valdivieso	
Jun 26, 1999	5	2000 meters	Turf	Gran Premio Estrellas Classic	I	Hipódromo de San Isidro	2.40	14	1	1:57.78	2 1/2 lengths	Jorge Valdivieso	
Aug 16, 1999	6	1800 meters	Dirt	Gran Premio General San Martin	I	Hipódromo Argentino de Palermo	1.40*	6	2	1:48.92	(2 1/2 lengths)	Jorge Valdivieso	
Sep 6, 1999	6	2000 meters	Dirt	Gran Premio Italia	III	Hipódromo Argentino de Palermo	2.30	5	1	2:01.60	1 length	Jorge Valdivieso	
Oct 9, 1999	6	2500 meters	Dirt	Gran Premio de Honor	I	Hipódromo Argentino de Palermo	1.95*	7	4	2:38.95	(2 1/4 lengths)	Jorge Valdivieso	
Nov 7, 1999	6	2400 meters	Turf	Gran Premio Copa de Oro	I	Hipódromo de San Isidro	4.50	7	3	2:24.95	(2 1/4 lengths)	Jorge Valdivieso	
Dec 12, 1999	6	2400 meters	Turf	Gran Premio Carlos Pellegrini	I	Hipódromo de San Isidro	16.20	18	7	2:21.98	(6 1/4 lengths)	Jorge Valdivieso	
May 26, 2000	6	1600 meters	Dirt	Gran Premio Benito Villanueva	II	Hipódromo Argentino de Palermo	2.60*†	8	6	1:33.42	(8 1/2 lengths)	Jorge Valdivieso	

An asterisk after the odds means Refinado Tom was the post time favorite. † indicates a coupled entry.

== Stud career ==
Refinado Tom retired to stud at his home farm of Haras La Biznaga. He proved to be subfertile, producing two foals from fourteen services in his first year and only producing one foal the following year. Two of his foals made it to the races, both winners, with Refina y Sobria being the superior racer. She was graded stakes placed in 2006, finishing second in the Group 2 Clásico Miguel Luis Morales and third in the Group 1 Gran Premio Selección de Potrancas.

Following his second year at stud, Refinado Tom was pensioned from stud duties to live out his life at Haras La Biznaga, where Bullrich would come visit to give him chocolates and take photos. Bullrich had started the habit of giving Refinado Tom small white chocolates when he was a foal.

Refinado Tom died at the age of 26 due to old age, on December 9, 2019.

Refinado Tom was cloned, with the resulting foal being born in 2018. The clone is not eligible to race as Thoroughbred racehorses must be conceived naturally to be registered, and is instead intended to be used for the breeding of polo horses for Santiago Blaquier.

== Pedigree ==
Pedigree of Refinado Tom (ARG), chestnut stallion, foaled August 28, 1993
Sire Shy Tom (USA) 1986	Blushing Groom (FR); 1974	Red God (USA)	Nasrullah (GB)
Sire Shy Tom (USA) 1986	Blushing Groom (FR); 1974	Red God (USA)	Spring Run (USA)
Sire Shy Tom (USA) 1986	Blushing Groom (FR); 1974	Runaway Bride (GB)	Wild Risk (FR)
Sire Shy Tom (USA) 1986	Blushing Groom (FR); 1974	Runaway Bride (GB)	Aimee (GB)
Sire Shy Tom (USA) 1986	Island Kitty (USA); 1976	Hawaii (SAF)	Utrillo (ITY)
Sire Shy Tom (USA) 1986	Island Kitty (USA); 1976	Hawaii (SAF)	Ethane (SAF)
Sire Shy Tom (USA) 1986	Island Kitty (USA); 1976	T. C. Kitten (USA	Tom Cat (USA)
Sire Shy Tom (USA) 1986	Island Kitty (USA); 1976	T. C. Kitten (USA	Needlebug (USA)
Dam Ma Raffine (ARG) 1987	Mountdrago (ARG); 1977	Sheet Anchor (USA)	Ambiorix (FR)
Dam Ma Raffine (ARG) 1987	Mountdrago (ARG); 1977	Sheet Anchor (USA)	Anchors Aweigh (USA)
Dam Ma Raffine (ARG) 1987	Mountdrago (ARG); 1977	Atbara (ARG)	Tobago (FR)
Dam Ma Raffine (ARG) 1987	Mountdrago (ARG); 1977	Atbara (ARG)	Eritrea (ARG)
Dam Ma Raffine (ARG) 1987	Reflejante (ARG); 1974	Practicante (ARG)	Pronto (ARG)
Dam Ma Raffine (ARG) 1987	Reflejante (ARG); 1974	Practicante (ARG)	Extraneza (ARG)
Dam Ma Raffine (ARG) 1987	Reflejante (ARG); 1974	Rutilante (ARG)	Rigolo (ARG)
Dam Ma Raffine (ARG) 1987	Reflejante (ARG); 1974	Rutilante (ARG)	Lapataia (ARG)
