= Gran Premio Copa de Plata =

G1 horse race in Argentina

- Class: Group 1
- Location: Hipódromo de San Isidro

Race information
- Distance: 2000 meters
- Surface: Turf
- Qualification: Three-year-old and up fillies and mares
- Weight: Weight for age
- Purse: $120,000,000 ARS (2025); 1st: $60,000,000 ARS

The Gran Premio Copa de Plata is a Group 1 horse race run at Hipódromo de San Isidro open to fillies and mares three years old or older. It is currently run over a distance of 2000 metres (1.2 mi) on the turf, and is one of the most important races for fillies and mares in Argentina, being sometimes known as the "Pellegrini de las yeguas" ("Pelligrini of the mares") or "El Pellegrini de las Hembras" ("The Pellegrini of the Females"), after the Gran Premio Carlos Pellegrini.

== History ==
The Gran Premio Copa de Plata has been run as a Group 1 race since at least 1980.

== Records since 1988 ==
Speed record:

- 1:56.69 – Joy Neverland (2022)

Greatest winning margin:

- 6 lengths – Croassant (1997)

Most wins:

Since 1988, no horse has won the Gran Premio Copa de Plata more than once.

Most wins by a jockey:

- 4 – Pablo Gustavo Falero (1991, 1997, 2005, 2007)
- 4 – Cardenas E. Talaverano (1996, 2008, 2009, 2012)

Most wins by a trainer:

- 5 – Juan Carlos Maldotti (1991, 1997, 1998, 2001, 2005)
- 4 – Carlos D. Etchechoury (1994, 2000, 2013, 2022)
- 4 – Miguel Ángel García (2002, 2003, 2004, 2009)
- 3 – Juan Carlos Etchechoury (1990, 2008, 2018)

Most wins by an owner:

- 6 – Haras Firmamento (2002, 2003, 2004, 2008, 2009, 2012)
- 5 – Haras Vacacion (1997, 1998, 2001, 2005, 2007)

Most wins by a breeder:

- 6 – Haras Firmamento (2002, 2003, 2004, 2008, 2009, 2012)
- 5 – Haras Vacacion (1997, 1998, 2001, 2005, 2007)

== Winners since 1988 ==
Year	Winner	Age	Jockey	Trainer	Owner	Breeder	Time	Margin	Ref
2025	Knows All	5	Brian Rodrigo Enrique	Diego Peña	Stud Haras Gran Muñeca	Stud Haras Gran Muñeca	1:58.45	4 lengths	
2024	Brienne Trigger	4	William Pereyra	Juan Franco Saldivia	Stud Las Canarias	Haras Marovi	1:58.24	2 lengths	
2023	Edict	3	Juan Cruz Villagra	Eduardo Gastón Accosano	Haras Triple Alliance	Haras Triple Alliance	1:58.13	1/2 neck	
2022	Joy Neverland	5	Brian Rodrigo Enrique	Carlos D. Etchechoury	Stud La Raya	Haras La Biznaga	1:56.69	3/4 length	
2021	Didia	3	William Pereyra	Luciano Rubén Cerutti	Haras La Manija	Haras La Manija	1:56.81	4 lengths	
2020	Elvas	4	Juan Cruz Villagra	Jorge A. Mayansky Neer	Stud Don Teodoro	Haras La Madrina	2:01.84	2 lengths	
2019	Seas Alabada	4	Damián Ramella	Fabio Ricardo Cacciabue	Stud Los Patrios	Haras El Paraíso	1:58.82	2 lengths	
2018	Global Beauty	4	Adrían M. Giannetti	Juan Carlos Etchechoury	Stud Tres P	Rafael Dellacasa	1:58.24	Head	
2017	Care Lady	3	Eduardo A. Ruarte	Antonio H. Marsiglia	Stud Los Cardones	Haras Abolengo	1:58.79	Neck	
2016	Dona Bruja	4	Aníbal José Cabrera	Agustín Pavlovsky	Stud Tres G.	Iván Roberto Gasparotto	2:00.13	1 1/2 lengths	
2015	Sobradora Inc	3	Fabricio Raúl Barroso	Roberto M. Bullrich	Stud Triunvirato	Haras La Biznaga	1:59.45	3/4 length	
2014	Pretty Girl	3	Juan Carlos Noriega	Alfredo F. Gaitán Dassié	Stud RDI	Haras El Chañar	1:59.28	3 1/2 lengths	
2013	Hendaia	3	Adrían M. Giannetti	Carlos D. Etchechoury	Stud Los Vascos	Haras Usasti	1:59.19	1 1/2 lengths	
2012	Miss Pinky	5	Cardenas E. Talaverano	Mauro García	Haras Firmamento	Haras Firmamento	1:56.94	3/4 length	
2011	La Laguna Azul	3	Jorge G. Ruíz Díaz	Roberto M. Bullrich	Haras Carampangue	Haras Carampangue	1:57.65	3 lengths	
2010	Malpensa	4	Adrián M. Giannetti	Juan Bautista Udaondo	Haras Santa Ines	Haras Santa Ines	1:58.42	1 1/2 lengths	
2009	Kalath Wells	3	Cardenas E. Talaverano	Miguel Ángel García	Haras Firmamento	Haras Firmamento	2:01.55	1/2 length	
2008	Miss Taylor	3	Cardenas E. Talaverano	Juan Carlos Etchechoury	Haras Firmamento	Haras Firmamento	1:57.60	Head	
2007	Filarmonia	4	Pablo Gustavo Falero	Juan Bautista Udaondo	Haras Vacacion	Haras Vacacion	1:57.32	6 lengths	
2006	Samba Reggae	3	Jorge Antonio Ricardo	Domingo Elias Pascual	Stud Bonaventura	Haras La Quebrada	1:57.60	Neck	
2005	Cursora	3	Pablo Gustavo Falero	Juan Carlos Maldotti	Haras Vacacion	Haras Vacacion	1:58.20	3 1/2 lengths	
2004	Halo Ola	4	Damián Ramella	Miguel Ángel García	Haras Firmamento	Haras Firmamento	1:59.30	3/4 length	
2003	Miss Loren	5	Julio César Méndez	Miguel Ángel García	Haras Firmamento	Haras Firmamento	1:59.08	1/2 length	
2002	Empeñosa Fitz	3	Edgardo Gramática	Miguel Ángel García	Haras Firmamento	Haras Firmamento	1:57.60	2 1/2 lengths	
2001	Decencia	4	Juan Carlos Noriega	Juan Carlos Maldotti	Haras Vacacion	Haras Vacacion	1:58.09	1 1/2 lengths	
2000	Feet of Clay	4	Julio César Méndez	Carlos D. Etchechoury	Haras Orilla del Monte	Haras Orilla del Monte	1:57.43	1 1/2 lengths	
1999	Alexine	4	Pedro Roberto Robles	Alfredo F. Gaitán Dassié	Haras Rio Claro	Haras São José e Expedictus	1:57.98	1 length	
1998	Delivery	3	Rubén Emilio Laitán	Juan Carlos Maldotti	Haras Vacacion	Haras Vacacion	1:58.09	2 lengths	
1997	Croassant	3	Pablo Gustavo Falero	Juan Carlos Maldotti	Haras Vacacion	Haras Vacacion	1:58.22	4 1/2 lengths	
1996	Kimba	4	Cardenas E. Talaverano	Jorge Salas Vera	Haras Myrna	Haras Myrna	1:58.62	1 1/2 lengths	
1995	Different	3	Juan José Paulé	Edgardo Oscar Martucci	Stud Alto Verde	Haras Abolengo	1:57.5	1 1/2 lengths	
1994	Tocopilla	4	Juan Alberto Maciel	Carlos D. Etchechoury	Haras de la Pomme	Haras de la Pomme	1:58.8	1/2 neck	
1993	Luck	6	Rubén Emilio Laitán	Eduardo M. Martínez De Hoz	Haras Comalal	Haras Comalal	1:58.2	1 1/2 lengths	
1992	La Francesa	4	Juan Carlos Jarcovsky		Haras La Quebrada	C. Ceriani and Sara C. Ferrer Reyes	1:57.6	2 1/2 lengths	
1991	Potrichal	3	Pablo Gustavo Falero	Juan Carlos Maldotti	Stud Tori	Haras La Madrugada	1:57.4	4 lengths	
1990	Jewellery	3	Jorge S. Caro Araya	Juan Carlos Etchechoury	Stud Matty	Haras La Quebrada	2:01.4	1/2 head	
1989	Laura Ly	3	José R. Abregú		Haras Rosa do Sul	Haras Rosa do Sul	1:58.8	1 1/2 lengths	
1988	Jabalina Brown	3	Miguel Ángel Abregú		Haras Rosa do Sul	Haras Rosa do Sul	1:58.4		

== Earlier winners ==
- 1980: Charming Mary
- 1981: Malaga
- 1982: Salt Spring
- 1983: Cerbatana
- 1984: So Glad
- 1986 (Jan): Harvard's Bay
- 1986 (Dec): Frau Eleonora
- 1987: Fiara
