= Gran Premio Estrellas Mile =

Group 1 horse race in Argentina

- Class: Group 1
- Inaugurated: 2008

Race information
- Distance: 1600 meters
- Surface: Varies
- Track: Hipódromo de San Isidro or Hipódromo Argentino de Palermo
- Qualification: Three-years-old and up
- Purse: $56,000,000 ARS (2026); 1st: $35,000,000 ARS

The Gran Premio Estrellas Mile is a Group 1 thoroughbred horse race that is part of the Carreras de las Estrellas and is open to horses three years old or older. It is run over a distance of 1600 metres (0.99 mi) either on the turf at Hipódromo de San Isidro or on the dirt at the Hipódromo Argentino de Palermo.

== History ==
The Gran Premio Estrellas Mile, first run as an ungraded stakes in 2008, was the first race to be added to the Carreras de las Estrellas since its third year in 1993. It was inspired by the Breeders' Cup Mile. The following year, in 2009, the Gran Premio Estrellas Mile was upgraded all the way to a Group 1 race.

In 2024, the Gran Premio Estrellas Mile became the first race in the Carreras de las Estrellas to have a dead heat when the first horse to cross the finish line, El Eminente, was disqualified to third for interfering with Folie Ninja, who dead heated with Bronx.

== Records ==
Speed record:

- 1:32.49 – Snapy Halo (2009)

Greatest winning margin:

- 9 lengths – Bahiaro (2008)

Most wins:

- No horse has won the Gran Premio Estrellas Mile more than once

Most wins by a jockey:

- 2 – Jorge Antonio Ricardo (2009, 2014)
- 2 – William Pereyra (2021, 2022)

Most wins by a trainer:

- 2 – Pablo Ezequiel Sahagián (2017, 2018)
- 2 – María Fernanda Álvarez (2019, 2024)

Most wins by an owner:

- 2 – Stud Rubio B. (2009, 2012)

Most wins by a breeder:

- 2 – Haras Firmamento (2009, 2019)
- 2 – Haras La Quebrada (2010, 2020)
- 2 – Haras Vacación (2018, 2023)

== Winners ==
Year	Winner	Age	Jockey	Trainer	Owner	Breeder	Group	Surface	Track	Time	Margin	Ref
2026	Que Tarde Gris	4	Adrián M. Giannetti	Carlos Arnaldo Vigil	Haras Tres Jotas	Haras Tres Jotas Sociedad Simple de la Seccion IV	I	Turf	Hipódromo de San Isidro	1:36.35	Neck	
2025	El Exito	4	Martín Javier Valle	José Cristóbal Blanco	F. Enrique	Haras El Paraiso	I	Dirt	Hipódromo Argentino de Palermo	1:35.27	1/2 length	
2024	Bronx	3	Cristian E. Velázquez	Juan Manuel Etchechoury	Stud Tres P	Rafael Dellacasa	I	Turf	Hipódromo de San Isidro	1:35.28	DQ	
2024	Folie Ninja	3	Brian Rodrigo Enrique	María Fernanda Álvarez	Stud La Mision	Luis Alberto Scalella	I	Turf	Hipódromo de San Isidro	1:35.28	DQ	
2023	Love the Races	4	Gonzalo Damián Borda	José Luiz Correa Aranha	Haras Vacacion	Haras Vacacion	I	Turf	Hipódromo de San Isidro	1:36.25	Head	
2022	Malibu Spring	4	William Pereyra	Marcelo S. Sueldo	Stud El Irlandés	Haras Vikeda	I	Dirt	Hipódromo Argentino de Palermo	1:33.71	5 lengths	
2021	Che Capanga	4	William Pereyra	Juan Franco Saldivia	Stud Chemecó	Patricio Losinno	I	Dirt	Hipódromo Argentino de Palermo	1:33.54	1/2 length	
2020	Power Up	5	Lautaro E. Balmaceda	Enrique Martín Ferro	Stud Urquiza	Haras La Quebrada	I	Dirt	Hipódromo Argentino de Palermo	1:33.92	3 lengths	
2019	Expressive Smart	4	F. Fernandes Gonçalves	María Fernanda Álvarez	Stud El Clan Corrientes	Haras Firmamento	I	Dirt	Hipódromo Argentino de Palermo	1:32.90	3/4 length	
2018	Magical Touch	4	Eduardo Ortega Pavón	Pablo Ezequiel Sahagián	Stud Facundito	Haras Vacacion	I	Dirt	Hipódromo Argentino de Palermo	1:34.93	5 lengths	
2017	Victory Security	4	Pablo Damián Carrizo	Pablo Ezequiel Sahagián	Stud Tramo 20	Haras La Pasión	I	Turf	Hipódromo de San Isidro	1:36.37	2 1/2 lengths	
2016	Eragon	4	Gustavo E. Calvente	Roberto Pellegatta	Juan Antonio	Haras Avourneen	I	Dirt	Hipódromo Argentino de Palermo	1:33.00	1/2 length	
2015	Todo Un Amiguito	6	Altair Domingos	Ernesto Eusebio Romero	Haras & Stud Don Nico	Carlos Monayer	I	Turf	Hipódromo de San Isidro	1:34.27	1/2 neck	
2014	Livingstone	3	Jorge Antonio Ricardo	Mariano Ariel Romero	Stud Il Capitano	Haras La Providencia	I	Dirt	Hipódromo Argentino de Palermo	1:33.41	1 length	
2013	Johnny Guitar	3	Pablo Gustavo Falero	Juan Sebastián Maldotti	Haras Santa Maria de Araras	Haras Santa Maria de Araras	I	Turf	Hipódromo de San Isidro	1:33.32	1 1/2 lengths	
2012	Evilasio	3	Juan Cruz Villagra	Juan Javier Etchechoury	Stud Rubio B.	Haras Don Arcángel	I	Dirt	Hipódromo Argentino de Palermo	1:33.27	3 lengths	
2011	Pick Out	4	Adrián M. Giannetti	Carlos D. Etchechoury	Stud El Gusy	Haras Orilla del Monte	I	Turf	Hipódromo de San Isidro	1:38.70	1 1/2 lengths	
2010	El Garufa	7	Claudio F. Quiroga	Luis Santiago Bedoya	Stud Snow Crest	Haras La Quebrada	I	Dirt	Hipódromo Argentino de Palermo	1:35.24	1/2 length	
2009	Snapy Halo	4	Jorge Antonio Ricardo	Juan Carlos Etchechoury	Stud Rubio B.	Haras Firmamento	I	Turf	Hipódromo de San Isidro	1:32.49	3 lengths	
2008	Bahiaro	4	Francisco Arreguy	Edmundo I. Rodríguez	Stud S. de B.	Haras El Paraíso	Ungraded	Dirt	Hipódromo Argentino de Palermo	1:32.98	9 lengths	
