= Team (horse) =

Argentinian thoroughbred racehorse

- Sire: Southern Halo
- Grandsire: Halo (horse)
- Dam: Teocratica
- Damsire: Farnesio
- Sex: Stallion
- Foaled: 8 September 1995
- Died: 19 January 1999
- Country: Argentina
- Colour: Dark Bay
- Breeder: Haras La Quebrada
- Owner: Stud Las Telas
- Trainer: Juan A. Colucho; Hector R. Pavarini
- Record: 10: 7-2-0
- Earnings: Arg$275,800

Major wins
- Gran Premio Santiago Luro (1998); Gran Premio Montevideo (1998); Carreras de las Estrellas Juvenile (1998)

Awards
- Argentine Horse of the Year (1998); Argentine Champion Two-Year-Old Colt (1998)

Team (8 September 1995–19 January 1999) is an Argentinian Thoroughbred racehorse. He was named both the 1998 Argentine Horse of the Year as well as 1998 Argentine Champion Two-Year-Old Colt for a campaign during which he won five graded stakes races. Team regularly won by multiple lengths and set two national speed records, at distances of 800 and 1000 meters.

== Background ==
Team was a solid dark bay bred by Haras La Quebrada, sired by perennial Argentinian leading sire Southern Halo out of the winning mare Teocrática. He was the last of four foals produced by the cross. None of the other full siblings had a race career of note. Hernán Ceriani Cernadas, owner of La Quebrada, said that Team's time at his stud was unremarkable, and that he never expected the colt to become a champion. Racing owners Stud Las Telas purchased him from La Quebrada for under $30,000 ARS. Team was trained initially by Juan Colucho, but was later trained by Hector Pavarini after his first race as a three-year-old.

== Racing career ==
=== 1997-1998: two-year-old season ===
Team's racing career began November 29, 1997 in a 800-meter allowance race run at Hipódromo Argentino de Palermo. He went off at odds of 1.85, beating 13 others, to win by 10 lengths in 0:43.39, setting an Argentinian speed record for the distance that stood until 2002. A month later, on December 28, Team won another 800 meter allowance race by 8 lengths. Team's first stakes race was the Group III Gran Premio Congreve over 1000 meters on February 18, 1998. It was also his first race on turf, with his two prior starts being on dirt, as well as his first start at a different racetrack, Hipódromo de San Isidro. The 1.10 favorite, Team won by four lengths in 0:54.86. He won the Group II Gran Premio Guillermo Kemmis on March 13, winning the 1000 meter race by nine lengths with a time of 0:54.43, once again setting a national record, which lasted until 2000.

Team's first Group I race was the Gran Premio Santiago Luro at a distance of 1200 meters. Team won by 10 lengths at odds of 1.20. Team won his second Group I in the Gran Premio Montevideo over 1500 meters, with a winning margin of 9 lengths. Team's last race at age two was the Group I Carreras de las Estrellas Juvenile on June 15, 1998 at Hipódromo Argentino de Palermo. Team won the race by six lengths in a time of 1:34.53 for the 1600 meters.

Team's final record at two was seven wins in seven starts, earning him end year honors as both the Champion Two-Year-Old Colt and as Horse of the Year in Argentina. In all of his races at two, he was ridden by Francisco Arreguy.

=== 1998-1999: three-year-old season ===
Team's first start at three was the Group I Gran Criterium over 1600 meters, in which he finished second by three-quarters of a length to Señor Juez as the part of the favorite coupled entry at 1.10. After this race, Team was transferred to a new trainer, Pavarini Hector. It was also the last time that he was ridden by Arreguy Francisco. Team's next race was the Group I Dos Mil Guineas, the first race in the San Isidro Triple Crown and run over 1600 meters on the turf. Starting as the 1.15 favorite, Team finished fifth of eleven runners under new jockey Jacinto Rafael Herrera, who also rode him in his next start. Team's last race at three, and the last of his career, was the Group I Gran Premio Polla de Potrillos, first race in the Argentinian Triple Crown and run over 1600 meters on the dirt. At odds of 1.50, Team finished second to Chevillard, part of the favored coupled entry with Team, by three-quarters of a length.

== Race record ==
| Date | Age | Race | Grade | Track | Distance | Surface | Odds | Field | Finish | Time | Winning (Losing) margin | Jockey | Ref |
|---|---|---|---|---|---|---|---|---|---|---|---|---|---|
| November 29, 1997 | 2 | Copa Lo Jack | Maiden Special Weight | Hipódromo Argentino de Palermo | 800 meters | Dirt | 1.85* | 14 | 1 | 0:43.39 | 10 lengths | Francisco Arreguy | |
| December 28, 1997 | 2 | Copa Lo Jack | Allowance | Hipódromo Argentino de Palermo | 800 meters | Dirt | 1.10*† | 12 | 1 | 0:44.49 | 8 lengths | Francisco Arreguy | |
| February 18, 1998 | 2 | Gran Premio Congreve | III | Hipódromo de San Isidro | 1000 meters | Turf | 1.10* | 5 | 1 | 0:54.86 | 4 lengths | Francisco Arreguy | |
| March 13, 1998 | 2 | Gran Premio Guillermo Kemmis | II | Hipódromo Argentino de Palermo | 1000 meters | Dirt | 1.05*† | 6 | 1 | 0:54.43 | 9 lengths | Francisco Arreguy | |
| April 11, 1998 | 2 | Gran Premio Santiago Luro | I | Hipódromo Argentino de Palermo | 1200 meters | Dirt | 1.20* | 8 | 1 | 1:09.31 | 10 lengths | Francisco Arreguy | |
| May 25, 1998 | 2 | Gran Premio Montevideo | I | Hipódromo Argentino de Palermo | 1500 meters | Dirt | 1.15* | 8 | 1 | 1:28.92 | 9 lengths | Francisco Arreguy | |
| June 15, 1998 | 2 | Carreras de las Estrellas Juvenile | I | Hipódromo Argentino de Palermo | 1600 meters | Dirt | 1.10* | 11 | 1 | 1:34.53 | 6 lengths | Francisco Arreguy | |
| July 4, 1998 | 3 | Gran Criterium | I | Hipódromo de San Isidro | 1600 meters | Turf | 1.10*† | 14 | 2 | 1:35.66 | (^{3}/_{4} length) | Francisco Arreguy | |
| August 15, 1998 | 3 | Dos Mil Guineas | I | Hipódromo de San Isidro | 1600 meters | Turf | 1.15* | 11 | 5 | 1:33.75 | (3½ lengths) | Jacinto Rafael Herrera | |
| September 12, 1998 | 3 | Polla de Potrillos | I | Hipódromo Argentino de Palermo | 1600 meters | Dirt | 1.50*† | 8 | 2 | 1:37.50 | (^{3}/_{4} length) | Jacinto Rafael Herrera | |

An asterisk after the odds means Team was the post time favorite.

† Part of a coupled entry

== Retirement ==
After the Gran Premio Polla de Potrillos, Team was retired from racing and sent to stand stud at Haras Firmamento for the 1998 Southern Hemisphere breeding season. There, he covered four mares, but only managed to get one pregnant. No registered foal was produced. The decision was made to return Team to race training, despite a crack in his right front hoof. During training, both of his front legs became injured, resulting in his being euthanized early in the morning January 19, 1999.

== Pedigree ==
Pedigree of Team (ARG), dark bay colt, 1995
| Sire Southern Halo (USA) 1983 | Halo (USA) 1969 | Hail to Reason (USA) | Turn-To (IRE) |
| Sire Southern Halo (USA) 1983 | Halo (USA) 1969 | Hail to Reason (USA) | Nothirdchance (USA) |
| Sire Southern Halo (USA) 1983 | Halo (USA) 1969 | Cosmah (USA) | Cosmic Bomb (USA) |
| Sire Southern Halo (USA) 1983 | Halo (USA) 1969 | Cosmah (USA) | Almahmoud (USA) |
| Sire Southern Halo (USA) 1983 | Northern Sea (USA) 1974 | Northern Dancer (CAN) | Nearctic (CAN) |
| Sire Southern Halo (USA) 1983 | Northern Sea (USA) 1974 | Northern Dancer (CAN) | Natalma (USA) |
| Sire Southern Halo (USA) 1983 | Northern Sea (USA) 1974 | Sea Saga (USA) | Sea Bird (FR) |
| Sire Southern Halo (USA) 1983 | Northern Sea (USA) 1974 | Sea Saga (USA) | Shama (USA) |
| Dam Teocratica (ARG) 1987 | Farnesio (ARG) 1974 | Good Manners (USA) | Nashua (USA) |
| Dam Teocratica (ARG) 1987 | Farnesio (ARG) 1974 | Good Manners (USA) | Fun House (USA) |
| Dam Teocratica (ARG) 1987 | Farnesio (ARG) 1974 | La Farnesina (ARG) | Cardanil (FR) |
| Dam Teocratica (ARG) 1987 | Farnesio (ARG) 1974 | La Farnesina (ARG) | La Dogana (ARG) |
| Dam Teocratica (ARG) 1987 | Theocratic (ARG) 1975 | Solazo (USA) | Beau Max (USA) |
| Dam Teocratica (ARG) 1987 | Theocratic (ARG) 1975 | Solazo (USA) | Solar System (GB) |
| Dam Teocratica (ARG) 1987 | Theocratic (ARG) 1975 | Theocracy (ARG) | Make Tracks (USA) |
| Dam Teocratica (ARG) 1987 | Theocratic (ARG) 1975 | Theocracy (ARG) | Talonada (ARG) |
