= Latin America Tour 2026 =

2026 concert tour by Jamiroquai

- Continental tour by Jamiroquai
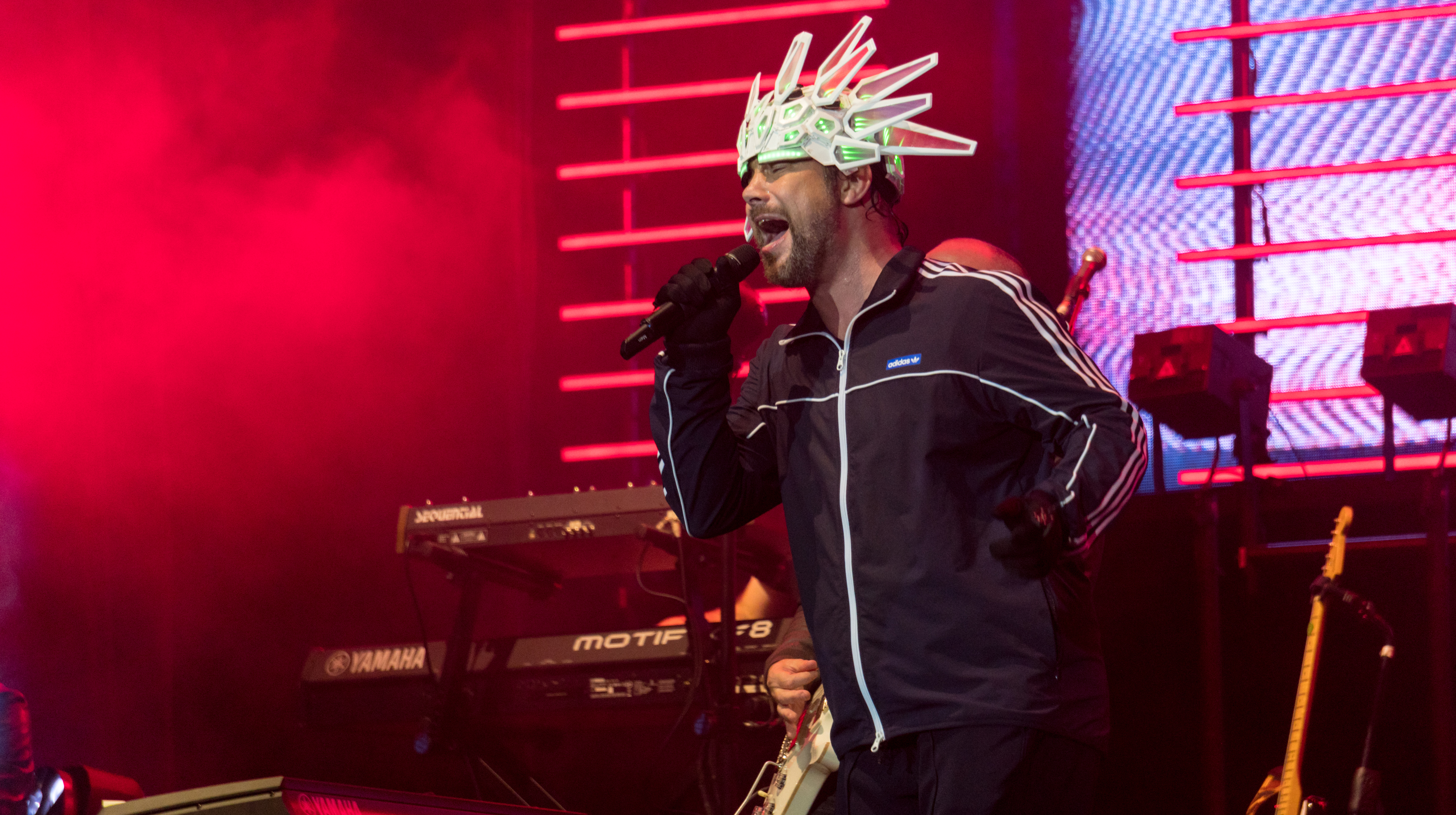
- Jamiroquai in 2017
- Start date: 11 September 2026
- End date: 27 September 2026
- Legs: 1
- No. of shows: 8

Jamiroquai concert chronology
- The Heels of Steel Tour (2026); Latin America Tour 2026 (2026)

Latin America Tour 2026 was a concert tour through Latin America and North America by the British band Jamiroquai, as a continuation of The Heels of Steel Tour 2025. The tour coincides with the 30th anniversary of "Virtual Insanity", the second single from their third studio album, Travelling without Moving, released on 19 August 1996.

== Background ==
At the end of 2025, Jay Kay, the band's vocalist, hinted that he would carry out a tour through Latin America, while performing at The O2 Arena in London, United Kingdom. In the months prior to the tour, several hits from Travelling without Moving and some unreleased songs were expected.

== Tour dates ==
The tour included performances in Brazil, Chile, Argentina, Colombia and Mexico.

| Date (2026) | City | Country | Venue |
|---|---|---|---|
| 11 September (Note: The concert in Rio de Janeiro on September 11, 2026, is set to be part of Rock in Rio festival.) | Rio de Janeiro | Brasil | Barra Olympic Park |
| 13 September (Note: Starting with this concert, Joy (Anonymous) was the opening act. In Chile, the band was also joined by Los Tetas.) | São Paulo | Brasil | Nubank Parque |
| 15 September | Santiago | Chile | Claro Arena |
| 17 September | Buenos Aires | Argentina | Hipódromo de San Isidro |
| 19 September | Bogotá | Colombia | Coliseo MedPlus |
| 23 September | Monterrey | México | Arena Monterrey |
| 25 September | Guadalajara | México | Arena Guadalajara |
| 27 September | Mexico City | México | Arena México |
