= Southern Halo =

American Thoroughbred racehorse

- Sire: Halo
- Grandsire: Hail To Reason
- Dam: Northern Sea
- Damsire: Northern Dancer
- Sex: Stallion
- Foaled: 1983
- Country: United States
- Colour: Bay
- Breeder: E. P. Taylor
- Owner: Stavros Niarchos
- Trainer: D. Wayne Lukas
- Record: 24: 5-7-3
- Earnings: £344,875

Awards
- Leading Sire in Argentina (1994–2001, 2003, 2007) Champion Sire in Argentina (1994, 1996, 1998, 1999, 2003, 2007) Champion Broodmare Sire in Argentina (2014–2018)

Southern Halo (1983–2009) was an American-bred Thoroughbred racehorse and sire. In his racing career he ran twenty-four times, winning five races and finishing second in the Grade I Swaps Stakes and Super Derby. He is chiefly notable for his remarkable career at stud where he was leading sire in Argentina on ten occasions and the sire of 170 stakes winners, including 56 Group/Grade I winners, and 16 champions.

== Background ==
Southern Halo was bred in Maryland by E. P. Taylor. As a yearling he was sent to the Keeneland sales where he was bought for $600,000 by the British Bloodstock Agency. He was originally sent into training in Ireland.

== Racing career ==
Southern Halo made little impact as a racehorse in Europe, finishing unplaced on both his starts. He was then sent to race in the United States where he was trained by D. Wayne Lukas. Southern Halo proved to be more successful racing in America. Although he recorded no major wins, he placed in several stakes races including the G1 Swaps Stakes, the G1 Super Derby, and the G2 Silver Screen Handicap. He was rated at 115 pounds in the Daily Racing Form Free Handicap for three-year-olds in 1986, 11 pounds below the high-weighted Snow Chief.

== Stud career ==
Southern Halo was retired to stud in Argentina, where he became one of the most successful stallions in the history of South American thoroughbred racing. Among his best progeny is the American Grade I winner and very successful sire More Than Ready. He also sired American Grade I winner Miss Linda, Argentinian Horse of the Year Team, Argentinian champion older horse and miler El Compinche, Argentinian Mare of the Year Pryka, and Canadian champion Edenwold. He sired 173 stakes winners (8.9%) from 1829 named foals. He died on November 19, 2009, in his paddock at the Haras La Quebrada near Buenos Aires.

== Pedigree ==
Pedigree of Southern Halo (USA), bay stallion, 1983
Sire Halo (USA) 1969	Hail To Reason; 1958	Turn-To	Royal Charger
Sire Halo (USA) 1969	Hail To Reason; 1958	Turn-To	Source Sucree
Sire Halo (USA) 1969	Hail To Reason; 1958	Nothirdchance	Blue Swords
Sire Halo (USA) 1969	Hail To Reason; 1958	Nothirdchance	Galla Colors
Sire Halo (USA) 1969	Cosmah; 1953	Cosmic Bomb	Pharamond
Sire Halo (USA) 1969	Cosmah; 1953	Cosmic Bomb	Banish Fear
Sire Halo (USA) 1969	Cosmah; 1953	Almahmoud	Mahmoud
Sire Halo (USA) 1969	Cosmah; 1953	Almahmoud	Arbitrator
Dam Northern Sea (USA) 1974	Northern Dancer; 1961	Nearctic	Nearco
Dam Northern Sea (USA) 1974	Northern Dancer; 1961	Nearctic	Lady Angela
Dam Northern Sea (USA) 1974	Northern Dancer; 1961	Natalma	Native Dancer
Dam Northern Sea (USA) 1974	Northern Dancer; 1961	Natalma	Almahmoud
Dam Northern Sea (USA) 1974	Sea Saga; 1968	Sea Bird	Dan Cupid
Dam Northern Sea (USA) 1974	Sea Saga; 1968	Sea Bird	Sicalade
Dam Northern Sea (USA) 1974	Sea Saga; 1968	Shama	Bold Ruler
Dam Northern Sea (USA) 1974	Sea Saga; 1968	Shama	Lea Lark(FamilyPampeluna: 16-g)
