= Gran Premio Estrellas Juvenile Fillies =

Group 1 horse race in Argentina

- Class: Group 1
- Inaugurated: 1991

Race information
- Distance: 1600 meters
- Surface: Varies
- Track: Hipódromo de San Isidro or Hipódromo Argentino de Palermo
- Qualification: Two-year-old fillies
- Purse: $64,000,000 ARS (2025); 1st: $40,000,000 ARS

The Gran Premio Estrellas Juvenile Fillies (also known as Gran Premio Estrellas Potrancas) is a Group 1 horse race in Argentina that is part of the Carreras de las Estrellas and is open to two-year-old fillies. It is run over a distance of 1600 metres (0.99 mi) either on the turf at Hipódromo de San Isidro or on the dirt at the Hipódromo Argentino de Palermo.

== History ==
The Gran Premio Estrellas Juvenile Fillies, along with the Gran Premio Estrellas Juvenile and Gran Premio Estrellas Junior Sprint, was one of the inaugural races of the Carreras de las Estrellas. It was originally run under the name of the Gran Premio Estrellas Potrancas and over a distance of 1500 meters (lengthened to its current distance of 1600 meters the following year). The Gran Premio Estrellas Juvenile Fillies was inspired by the Breeders' Cup Juvenile Fillies.

In 2002, the Gran Premio Juvenile Fillies became the fourth race in Miss Terrible's streak of 7 consecutive Group 1 race wins. The win helped secure her the Argentine championship for two-year-old fillies.

== Records ==
Speed record:

- 1600 meters (current distance): 1:32.98 – Inca Noble (2007)
- 1500 meters: 1:28.6 – Irina (1991)

Greatest winning margin:

- 7 lengths – Inca Noble (2007)

Most wins by a jockey:

- 4 – Pablo Gustavo Falero (1992, 1993, 2009, 2012)
- 3 – Juan Carlos Noriega (1998, 2004, 2005)

Most wins by a trainer:

- 3 – Carlos D. Etchechoury (2001, 2009, 2023)
- 3 – Juan Carlos Etchechoury (2003, 2007, 2008)
- 3 – Roberto Pellegatta (2004, 2006, 2011)
- 3 – Juan Manuel Etchechoury (2019, 2021, 2024)

Most wins by an owner:

- 4 – Haras Firmamento (2002, 2008, 2014, 2024)

Most wins by a breeder:

- 8 – Haras Abolengo (1995, 1998, 2007, 2010, 2011, 2017, 2018, 2020)
- 4 – Haras Firmamento (2002, 2008, 2014, 2024)
- 3 – Haras La Biznaga (2003, 2004, 2019)
- 3 – Haras Vacación (1997, 2012, 2022)

== Winners ==
Year	Winner	Jockey	Trainer	Owner	Breeder	Distance	Surface	Track	Time	Margin	Ref
2025	Charm	Martín Javier Valle	José Cristóbal Blanco	Haras Triple Alliance	Haras Triple Alliance	1600 meters	Dirt	Hipódromo Argentino de Palermo	1:36.92	3 lengths	
2024	Quita Rim	William Pereyra	Juan Manuel Etchechoury	Haras Firmamento	Haras Firmamento	1600 meters	Turf	Hipódromo de San Isidro	1:36.97	2 1/2 lengths	
2023	Neverwalkalone	Adrián M. Giannetti	Carlos D. Etchechoury	Stud Haras Rio Dois Irmaos	Stud Haras Rio Dois Irmaos	1600 meters	Turf	Hipódromo de San Isidro	1:34.92	2 lengths	
2022	Nueva Fragancia	Cristian E. Velázquez	Edgardo Oscar Martucci	Pedro Rodolfo	Haras Vacacion	1600 meters	Dirt	Hipódromo Argentino de Palermo	1:37.08	1 1/2 lengths	
2021	Lindalevesolta	Adrián M. Giannetti	Juan Manuel Etchechoury	Stud Haras Rio Dois Irmaos	Stud Haras Rio Dois Irmaos	1600 meters	Dirt	Hipódromo Argentino de Palermo	1:35.49	Head	
2020	Infartame	Gabriel L. Bonasola	Nicolás Martín Ferro	Stud Carmel	Haras Abolengo	1600 meters	Dirt	Hipódromo Argentino de Palermo	1:34.47	3/4 length	
2019	Joy Epifora	Iván E. Monasterolo	Juan Manuel Etchechoury	Stud La Nora	Haras La Biznaga	1600 meters	Dirt	Hipódromo Argentino de Palermo	1:33.77	Nose	
2018	Shyster	Wilson R. Moreyra	Omar Fernando Labanca	Stud Los Samanes	Haras Abolengo	1600 meters	Dirt	Hipódromo Argentino de Palermo	1:34.83	Head	
2017	Positive Mind	Gustavo E. Calvente	María Fernanda Álvarez	Juan Antonio	Haras Abolengo	1600 meters	Turf	Hipódromo de San Isidro	1:37.73	1 1/2 lengths	
2016	Kononkop	Altair Domingos	Pedro Nickel	Haras La Providencia	Haras La Providencia	1600 meters	Dirt	Hipódromo Argentino de Palermo	1:36.15	Neck	
2015	Seresta	Jorge Antonio Ricardo	Osvaldo Daniel Dávila	Stud Los Dago	Haras Santa Maria de Araras	1600 meters	Turf	Hipódromo de San Isidro	1:35.05	2 1/2 lengths	
2014	Quita Nistel	Cardenas E. Talaverano	Mauro García	Haras Firmamento	Haras Firmamento	1600 meters	Dirt	Hipódromo Argentino de Palermo	1:34.14	5 lengths	
2013	Juhayna	Altair Domingos	José Martins Alves	Haras La Providencia	Haras La Providencia	1600 meters	Turf	Hipódromo de San Isidro	1:33.65	1/2 neck	
2012	Caldine	Pablo Gustavo Falero	Juan Sebastian Maldotti	Haras Vacacion	Haras Vacacion	1600 meters	Dirt	Hipódromo Argentino de Palermo	1:34.14	1 1/2 lengths	
2011	Gamuza Fina	Mario E. Fernández	Roberto Pellegatta	Stud A.J.M.	Haras Abolengo	1600 meters	Turf	Hipódromo de San Isidro	1:38.92	1/2 length	
2010	Coordenada	José Ricardo Méndez	Omar Fernando Labanca	Stud Victoria	Haras Abolengo	1600 meters	Dirt	Hipódromo Argentino de Palermo	1:36.84	1/2 length	
2009	True Passion	Pablo Gustavo Falero	Carlos D. Etchechoury	Haras Orilla del Monte	Haras Orilla del Monte	1600 meters	Turf	Hipódromo de San Isidro	1:33.98	2 1/2 lengths	
2008	Miss Bamba	Damián Ramella	Juan Carlos Etchechoury	Haras Firmamento	Haras Firmamento	1600 meters	Dirt	Hipódromo Argentino de Palermo	1:34.09	6 lengths	
2007	Inca Noble	Jorge Antonio Ricardo	Juan Carlos Etchechoury	Haras Abolengo	Haras Abolengo	1600 meters	Turf	Hipódromo de San Isidro	1:32.98	7 lengths	
2006	La Cocasse	Jactino R. Herrera	Roberto Pellegatta	Haras La Quebrada	Haras La Quebrada	1600 meters	Dirt	Hipódromo Argentino de Palermo	1:33.70	2 lengths	
2005	Safari Queen	Juan Carlos Noriega	Juan Carlos Maldotti	Haras Santa Maria de Araras	Haras Santa Maria de Araras	1600 meters	Turf	Hipódromo de San Isidro	1:33.75	1 1/2 lengths	
2004	Forty Greeta	Juan Carlos Noriega	Roberto Pellegatta	Sheik Rashid Al Maktoum	Haras La Biznaga	1600 meters	Dirt	Hipódromo Argentino de Palermo	1:36.39	4 lengths	
2003	Dale Lunfa	Jactino R. Herrera	Juan Carlos Etchechoury	Haras La Biznaga	Haras La Biznaga	1600 meters	Turf	Hipódromo de San Isidro	1:37.82	1/2 head	
2002	Miss Terrible	Edgardo Gramática	Miguel Ángel García	Haras Firmamento	Haras Firmamento	1600 meters	Dirt	Hipódromo Argentino de Palermo	1:37.16	1 length	
2001	Ivory Tower	Julio César Méndez	Carlos D. Etchechoury	Sydney & Jenny Craig	Haras Orilla del Monte	1600 meters	Turf	Hipódromo de San Isidro	1:33.32	Neck	
2000	Chloris	Pedro Roberto Robles	Ricardo A. Reigert	Stud Rio Claro	Linneu de Paula Machado	1600 meters	Dirt	Hipódromo Argentino de Palermo	1:36.67	3 lengths	
1999	Venusberg	Horacio J. Betansos	Roberto M. Bullrich	Cobra Farm	Haras La Quebrada	1600 meters	Turf	Hipódromo de San Isidro	1:34.15	2 1/2 lengths	
1998	Esperada	Juan Carlos Noriega	Roberto A. Pellegatta	Stud A.J.M.	Haras Abolengo	1600 meters	Dirt	Hipódromo Argentino de Palermo	1:36.41	6 lengths	
1997	Slew of Reality	Horacio E. Karamanos	Juan A. Colucho	Stud Las Telas	Haras Vacacion	1600 meters	Dirt	Hipódromo Argentino de Palermo	1:37.83	Neck	
1996	Southern Spring	Oscar Fabián Conti	Eduardo M. Martínez de Hoz	Stud Matty	Haras Las Matildes	1600 meters	Dirt	Hipódromo Argentino de Palermo	1:35.90	6 lengths	
1995	Different	Juan José Paule	Edgardo Oscar Martucci	Stud Alto Verde	Haras Abolengo	1600 meters	Dirt	Hipódromo Argentino de Palermo	1:34.75	3 lengths	
1994	Star and Stripes	Yolanda B. Dávila	Luis Eduardo Seglín	Stud Dulcinea	Haras El Candil	1600 meters	Turf	Hipódromo de San Isidro	1:35.4	1 length	
1993	Parfait Amour	Pablo Gustavo Falero	Eduardo F. Croza	Stud El Apolo	Haras Los Apamates	1600 meters	Turf	Hipódromo de San Isidro	1:36.4	2 lengths	
1992	Potridee	Pablo Gustavo Falero	Alberto J. Maldotti	Stud Tori	Haras La Madrugada	1600 meters	Turf	Hipódromo de San Isidro	1:36.2	5 lengths	
1991	Irina	Rubén Darío Galloso	Oscar H. Carabal	Stud Tres Jotas	Haras Alto Grande	1500 meters	Turf	Hipódromo de San Isidro	1:28.6	3/4 length	
