= Haras La Biznaga =

Racehorse stud farm in Argentina, 1972–2018

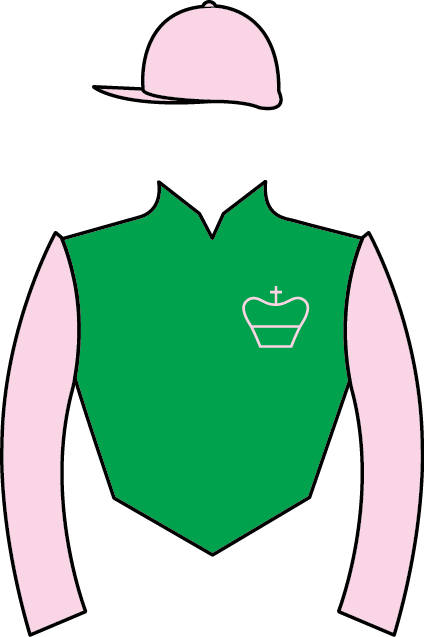
- Racing silks of Haras La Biznaga
- Type: Horse breeding farm and Thoroughbred racing stable
- Industry: Thoroughbred horse racing
- Founded: 1972
- Defunct: 2018
- Fate: Liquidated

Haras La Biznaga was "one of Argentina's most famous and historic" thoroughbred racehorse breeding and training farms in Argentina. It was originally founded as an agricultural business in 1961, with the horse stud farm built in 1972 and liquidated in 2018.

== History ==
The land that would eventually become Haras La Biznaga was purchased by Carlos María Lucio Blaquier and Virginia de Alzaga de Blaquier in 1891, covering nearly ten square miles. Carlos María designed the silks used by the farm, green with pink sleeves.

Carlos Thays designed the estate's park, and either Valentín Solis or Ferruccio Togneri designed the house.

In 1961, the Blaquier family set up a company, La Biznaga S.A. to own the farm, which at the time consisted of various dairies and bred shorthorn cattle.

In 1970, Herminio Arrieta, then head of La Biznaga S.A., died, passing on the farm to his son-in-law Carlos Pedro Blaquier, then a doctor in the United States. Carlos Pedro returned to Argentina to run the company. He turned the farm towards racing, regaining the silks from a cousin who had inherited them. New to the racing industry, the farm started by buying inferior horses for cheap. In 1968, they purchased 20 mares and the stallion Tamuré, by Sideral.

In 1972, the stud farm and racing stable was created, located at the estancia La Bellaca, occupying nearly two thousand acres. The facilities included two yearling barns, stallion barn, mare barn, and administrative office forming an 'H' shape, totaling 219 stalls, and a 1200-meter training track.

The first four colts bred by Haras La Biznaga debuted together in the same race and finished in the last four positions. Arturo R. Bullrich was consulted to help with improving their stock and performance. He selected 60 mares for the farm to purchase, including Vacación, namesake of Haras Vacación. The stallion Practicante, winner of the Gran Premio Jockey Club, Gran Premio Nacional, and Gran Premio Carlos Pellegrini was also acquired.

In 1989, Carlos Pedro Blaquier had a heart attack and passed on management of the farm to his son Carlos Herminio Blaquier, known as "Charlie". Lacking experience in horse racing, Carlos Herminio studied up on the sport and pedigrees. Carlos Herminio recommended selling the farm due its lack of profitability, but Carlos Pedro wanted to keep the farm. Carlos Herminio worked to help maintain the farm financially stable.

In the early 2000s, the farm had about 145 broodmares and produced about 120 foals a year. A group of fillies would be reserved for the farm and others auctioned off.

Trainers employed by the farm include Julio Penna, Juan Estebán, Carlos Bianchi, Roberto Pellegatta, Roberto Bullrich, and Carlos Etchechoury. Jorge Valdivieso rode for Haras La Biznaga.

In 2018, the farm was liquidated due to the retirement of its manager and no interest in running the farm from Carlos's sons. The broodmares were auctioned off in March, with netting over US$5,000,000 and selling for an average of $37,430. Giant Remex and Giant Marked topped the sale at $260,000 each to Haras Don Alberto, a new record in Argentina. Of the ten highest priced purchased, only the eighth highest went to an Argentine buyer, with Haras Embrujo purchasing Stormy Sober for $135,000.

The yearlings were sold in an auction in December, yielding a net of $1,752,240 for 82 of the 84 yearlings for sale, with an average of $20,860. Topping the sale was the record-setting sale of Joy Belinda (later renamed Nuwara Eliya) for $120,000.

Martín Alberto Ferrari, manager of Haras Don Alberto, incorporates various techniques he learned from Haras La Biznaga in his operation, including nutritional and sanitary programs.

== Notable horses ==
Haras La Biznaga produced 71 Group 1 winners.

=== Stallions ===
Notable stallions that have stood at stud at Haras La Biznaga include:

- Egg Toss – Leading sire in Argentina in 1993
- Mat-Boy – Sire of 8 Group 1 winners in Argentina
- Bernstein – Leading sire in Argentina in 2009 and 2011; leading broodmare sire in Argentina in 2020
- Include – Leading sire in Argentina in 2015
- Practicante – Leading two-year-old sire in Argentina in 1977, 1978, and 1982
- Frari – Leading sire in Argentina in 1985 and 1986
- Roar – Argentine Champion Sire in 2004

=== As a breeder ===
- Vacilante (1974) – Winner of the 1978 Gran Premio Dardo Rocha and Gran Premio José Pedro Ramírez
- Auspiciante (1981) – Winner of the 1986 Ramona Handicap and Matriarch Stakes and 1987 Beverly Hills Handicap
- Frau Altiva (1982) – 1985 Argentine Champion Three-Year-Old Female, winner of the 1985 Gran Premio Mil Guineas and Gran Premio Polla de Potrancas
- Frau Eleonora (1983) – 1986 Argentine Champion Three-Year-Old Female, winner of the 1986 Gran Premio Copa de Plata
- Savage Toss (1985) – 1989 Argentine Horse of the Year and Champion Stayer, winner of the 1989 Gran Premio 9 de Julio, Gran Premio Latinoamericano, Gran Premio de Honor, 1990 Queen Elizabeth Stakes, etc.
- Fanatic Boy (1987) – Winner of the 1990 Gran Premio Nacional and Gran Premio Gran Criterium
- Motivation (ex Freak Toss) (1987) – Winner of the 1993 Hong Kong Cup
- Vilas Light (1989) – Winner of the 1992 Gran Premio Provincia de Buenos Aires and Gran Premio Montevideo
- Refinado Tom (1993) – Winner of the Argentine Triple Crown, 1996 Argentine Champion Two-Year-Old Male, Three-Year-Old Male, and Stayer
- Mechon Tom (1995) – Winner of the 1998 Gran Premio Raúl y Raúl E. Chevalier and Gran Premio Dos Mil Guineas
- South Vagabunda (2000) – 2003 Argentine Champion Two-Year-Old Female, winner of the 2003 Gran Premio Jorge de Atucha and Gran Premio Saturnino J. Unzué
- Forty Doriana (2000) – 2003 Argentine Champion Female Sprinter, winner of the Gran Premio Estrellas Sprint, Gran Premio Félix de Alzaga Unzué, Gran Premio Ciudad de Buenos Aires, Gran Premio Suipacha, etc.
- Forty Fabuloso (2000) – 2004 Argentine Champion Older Male and Champion Miler, winner of the 2004 Gran Premio Joaquín V. González, 2004 and 2005 Gran Premio Joaquín S. de Anchorena, etc.
- Forty Greeta (2001) – 2004 Argentine Champion Two-Year-Old Female, winner of the 2004 Gran Premio Estrellas Juvenile Fillies and Gran Premio Jorge de Atucha
- Forty Mirage (2001) – 2004 Argentine Champion Two-Year-Old Male, winner of the Gran Premio Estrellas Sprint, Gran Premio Raúl y Raúl E. Chevalier, etc.
- Forty Marchanta (2001) – 2004 Argentine Mare of the Year and Champion Three-Year-Old Female, winner of the 2004 Gran Premio de Potrancas, Gran Premio Selección, and Gran Premio Polla de Potrancas
- Storm Mayor (2002) – 2006 Argentine Horse of the Year, Champion Older Male, and Champion Stayer, winner of the 2006 Gran Premio de Honor and Gran Premio Copa de Oro and 2005 and 2006 Gran Premio Carlos Pellegrini
- Storm Military (2002) – 2006 Argentine Champion Miler, winner of the 2006 Gran Premio Joaquín S. de Anchorena and Gran Premio Miguel Alfredo Martínez de Hoz
- Storm Marcopolo (2003) – 2007 Argentine Champion Sprinter, winner of the Gran Premio Estrellas Spint and Gran Premio Ciudad de Buenos Aires
- Storm Chispazo (2006) – Winner of the 2009 Gran Premio Nacional
- Sociologa Inc (2010) – 2014 Argentine Champion Older Female, winner of the 2014 Gran Premio Criadores
- Sobradora Inc (2012) – 2015 Argentine Mare of the Year and Champion Three-Year-Old Female, winner of the Gran Premio Enrique Acebal and Gran Premio Copa de Plata

== Awards ==
Haras La Biznaga won the Pellegrini award for Argentine Champion Breeder in 1982 and 2004 and Argentine Champion Owner in 1996, 2004, and 2014.
