= Hipódromo de San Isidro =

Horse racing track in San Isidro, Buenos Aires, Argentina

Coordinates: 34°28′59.01″S 58°31′8.66″W

Hipodromo de San Isidro
- Interactive map of Hipodromo de San Isidro
- Location: San Isidro, Argentina
- Date opened: December 8, 1935
- Race type: Thoroughbred
- Notable races: GP Internacional Carlos Pellegrini (Arg-G1); GP Internacional Felix de Alzaga Inzue (Arg-G1); GP Internacional J. S. de Anchorena (Arg-G1); Gran Premio Jockey Club (Arg-G1)

The Hipódromo de San Isidro is a horse racing track located in San Isidro, Buenos Aires, Argentina, owned by the Argentine Jockey Club. It is one of the largest and most important racetracks in the Americas. 120 racing days are held per year, on every Wednesday, every other Friday and Saturday, and some Sundays.

The Hipódromo is located 22 km from Buenos Aires City. It has an area of 1.48 km^{2}.

Each December, the Hipódromo hosts the Gran Premio Carlos Pellegrini, the most important horse race in Argentina.

The Hipódromo de San Isidro hosts the annual Carlos Pellegrini Awards.

The venue is also home to musical events such as Latin America Tour 2026 by Jamiroquai.

== History ==
In 1926, the Argentine Jockey Club purchased 316 hectares for the purposes of building an additional racecourse to accompany its Hipódromo de Palermo. In 1930, a golf course was completed on the property, designed by Allister Mckenzie. The course itself was built using the latest methods, with accompanying training tracks, stalls, and veterinary hospital building. On December 8, 1935, the racecourse was completed and opened.

An inner dirt track was added in 1994.

== Facilities ==
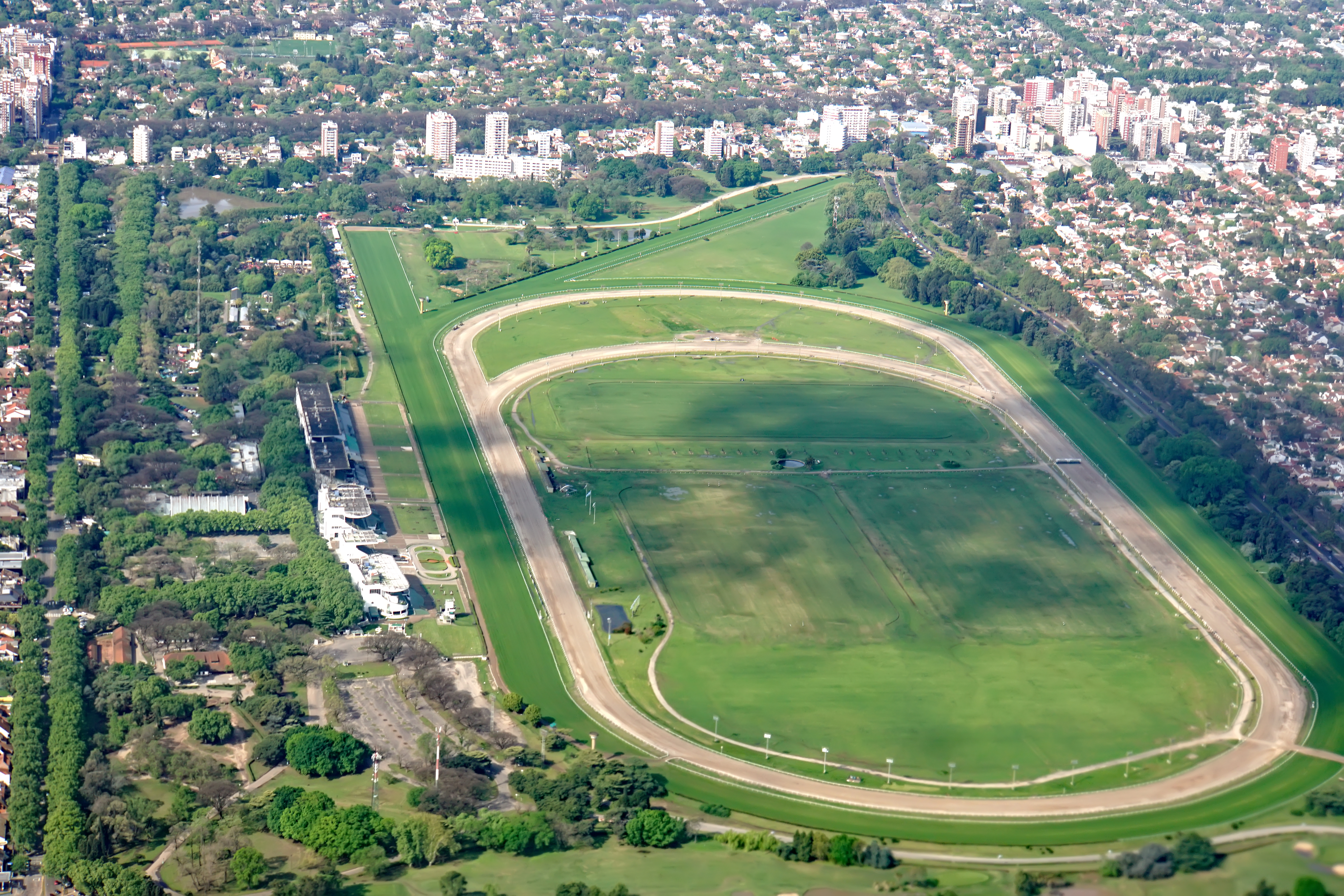
An aerial view of the racetrack in 2019

The racecourse occupies an area of 148 hectares, with a main turf course 2,783 metres (1.729 mi) around, 45 metres (49 yd) wide, and with a chute for straight races of 1,000 metres (0.62 mi), races of 1,400 metres (0.87 mi) using a diagonal, and a chute for single turn races of 2,400 metres (1.5 mi). The inner dirt course is 2,590 metres (1.61 mi) around and 31 metres (34 yd) wide, allowing it to host races of up to 24 horses.

The grandstands have a capacity of 100,000, with 32,000 square metres (340,000 sq ft) of covered seating. The record attendance is 300,000 for the 2022 LollaPalooza Argentina.

The property includes five training tracks, covering 94 hectares, including a 30 metres (33 yd) wide and 2,420 metres (1.50 mi) long turf track, a 25 metres (27 yd) wide and 2,247 metres (1.396 mi) long sand track, a 25 metres (27 yd) wide and 2,100 metres (1.3 mi) long dirt track, and two smaller river sand tracks. There are 135 stables containing 1,800 stalls.

Other amenities include a chemical laboratory that processes post-race samples from across the country, a veterinary hospital with a Center for Regenerative Veterinary Medicine, a school for apprentice jockeys, a school for farriers, an arboretum, and a sales floor for horses containing space for 3,600 people.

== Important races ==
Group 1 Races

- Copa de Oro Alfredo Lalor
- Copa de Plata Roberto Vasquez Mansilla Internacional
- Dos Mil Guineas
- Gran Criterium
- Gran Premio 25 de Mayo - Copa Dr. Enrique Olivera
- Gran Premio Carlos Pellegrini Internacional
- Gran Premio de Potrancas
- Gran Premio Enrique Acebal
- Gran Premio Felix de Alzaga Unzué Internacional
- Gran Premio Hipódromo de San Isidro - Copa Melchor Ángel Posse
- Gran Premio Joaquin S. de Anchorena Internacional
- Gran Premio Jockey Club
- Gran Premio Miguel Alfredo Martínez de Hoz
- Gran Premio Suipacha
- Mil Guineas

Group 2 Races

- Gran Premio 9 de Julio
- Gran Premio América
- Gran Premio Carlos P. Rodriguez
- Gran Premio Cyllene
- Gran Premio Ecuador
- Gran Premio Eliseo Ramírez
- Gran Premio Federico de Alvear
- Gran Premio Forli
- Gran Premio Horacio Bustillo
- Gran Premio Juan Shaw
- Gran Premio La Mission
- Gran Premio Los Haras
- Gran Premio Omega
- Gran Premio Partícula
- Gran Premio Paseana
- Gran Premio Pippermint
- Gran Premio Raúl y Raúl E. Chevallier
- Gran Premio Ricardo Ezequiel y Ezequiel M. Fernández Guerrico
- Gran Premio Sibila

Group 3 Races

- Gran Premio Botafogo
- Gran Premio Condesa
- Gran Premio de la Provincia de Buenos Aires César Iraola
- Gran Premio Ensayo Fernando Santamarina
- Gran Premio Eudoro J. Balsa
- Gran Premio General Las Heras
- Gran Premio General Pueyrredón
- Gran Premio General Viamonte
- Gran Premio Invasor
- Gran Premio Ocurrencia
- Gran Premio Olavarría
- Gran Premio Pedro Chapar
- Gran Premio Porteño
- Gran Premio Progreso
- Gran Premio Santiago Lawrie
- Gran Premio Southern Halo
- Gran Premio Velocidad
