= Hipódromo Argentino de Palermo =

Horse racing course in Buenos Aires, Argentina

Coordinates: 34.5669°S 58.4252°W

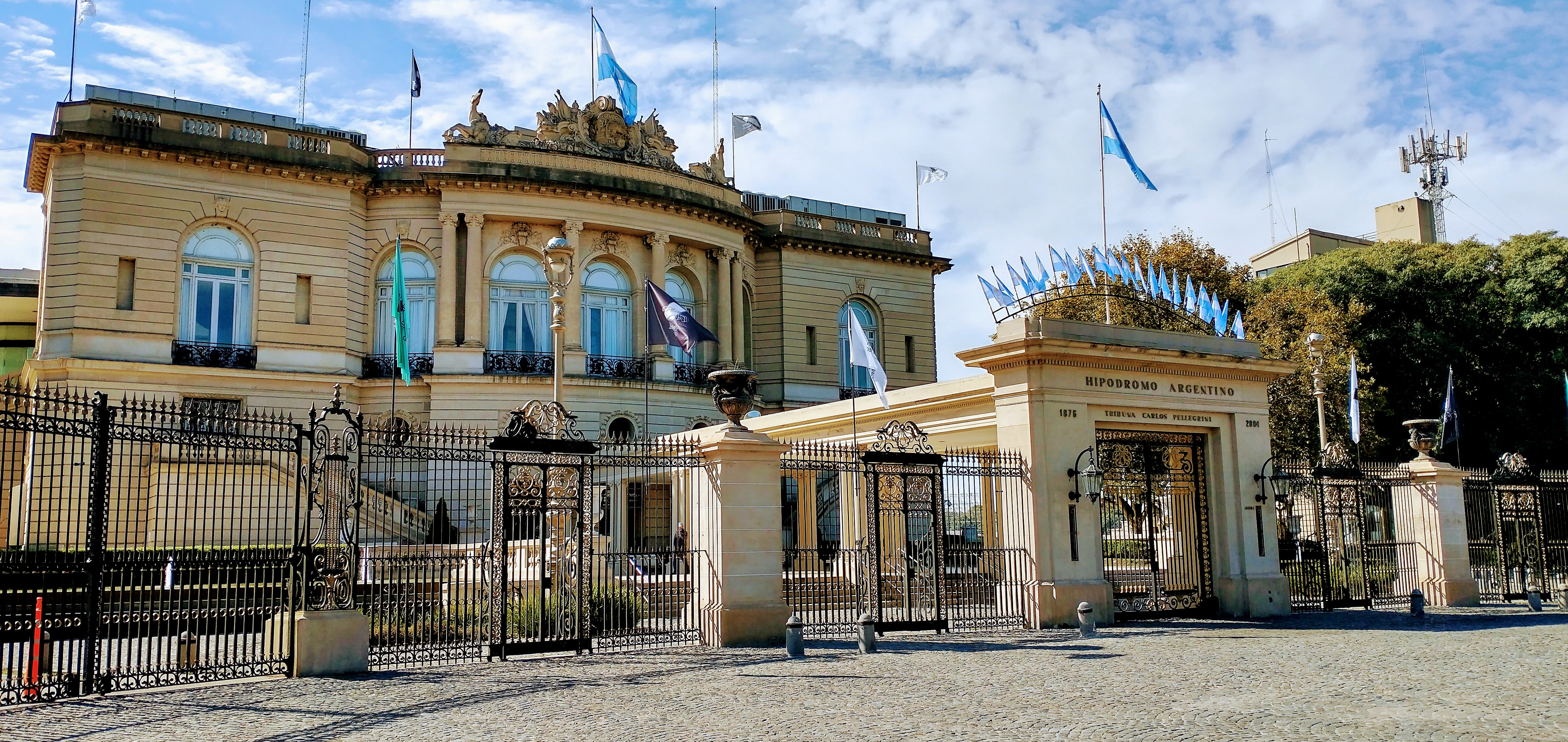
- Interactive map of Hipódromo Argentino de Palermo
- Location: Palermo, Buenos Aires, Argentina
- Owned by: (Hipódromo Argentino de Palermo S.A.) HAPSA
- Date opened: 1876
- Course type: Flat

The Hipódromo Argentino de Palermo is a horse racing course located in Buenos Aires, Argentina, and one of the most important in the country, hosting 120 days of racing and 1,400 races every year. Races are hosted three days a week, with about nine races per racing day. The property is open to the public free of charge twenty-four hours a day.

Its dirt course is considered one of the best in the world, and the track is one of the most modern in South America.

The Hipódromo Argentino de Palermo also hosts music concerts, attracting twenty to twenty-five thousand attendants, and culinary fairs, attracting ten to twenty thousand attendants. Musicians that have played include Alejandro Sanz, Fito Paez, Lisandro Aristimuño, Divididos, David Bisbal, Katy Perry, Maroon 5, Måneskin and TINI. These events are hosted in the hippodrome park (parque hipódromo), in the middle of the track. Adidas also hosts running training events at the park.

== History ==
The Hipódromo de Palermo was first opened on 7 May 1876, as one of the first racecourses in the city of Buenos Aires. On its inauguration, the trains and streetcars of Buenos Aires were not enough to transport the large number of people who wanted to attend the event. Despite this, close to 10,000 people witnessed the first race ever disputed at the Hipódromo, won by the horse Resbaloso. The grandstand was designed by Néstor París and could seat 1,600 people.

The Argentine Jockey Club, formed in 1881, began to administrate the racecourse in 1884.

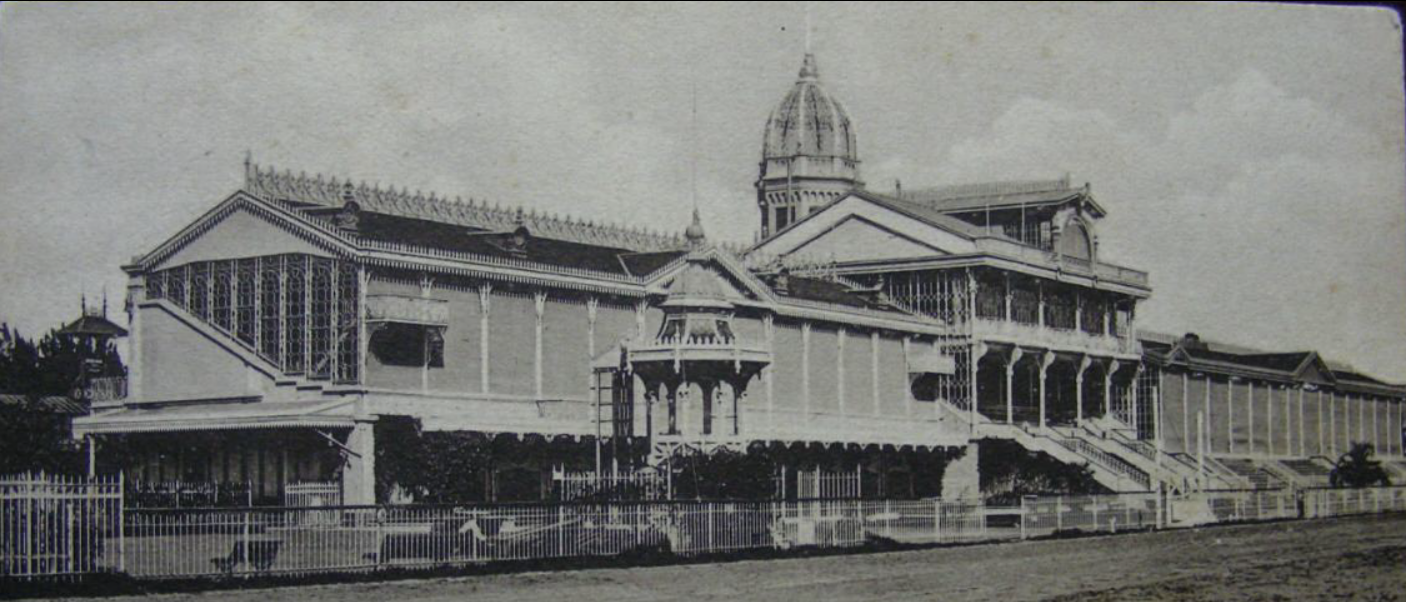
The original grandstand in 1899

The Gran Premio Nacional (Argentine Derby), now the most important race run at the course, was first run in 1885, won by Souvenir.

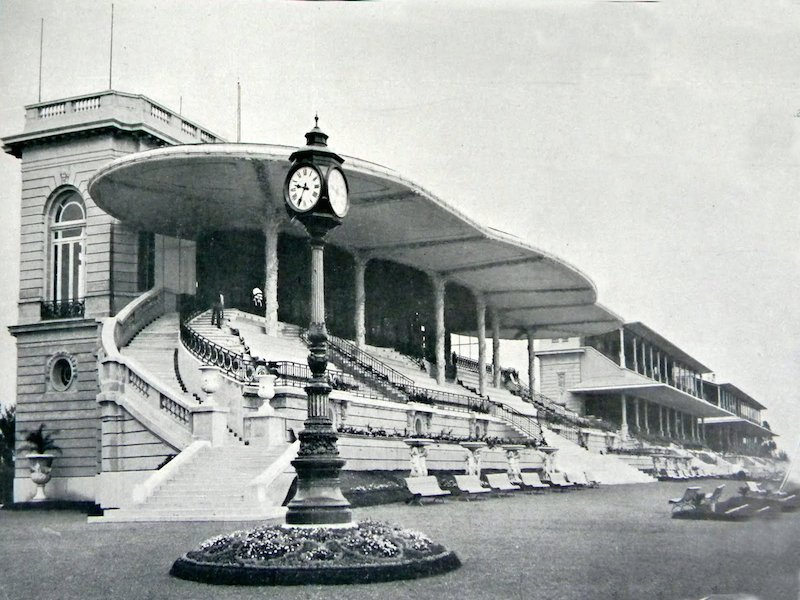
The stands in 1920

Tattersalls de Palermo, an equine sales floor, was opened in 1898.

The first automobile race in Argentina was run at the Hipódromo de Palermo in 1901.

In 1908, the original buildings and grandstands were replaced with a Beaux Arts grandstand designed by Louis Faure-Dujarric, still in use today and considered part of the city's architectural heritage.

Photo finishes, using Photochart, were introduced in 1947.

The racecourse has been known by its current name of Hipódromo Argentino de Palermo since 1953. Prior to that, it was known as Hipódromo de Palermo.

Night racing started in 1971, with the installation of an electrical lighting system on a racetrack. Seven hundred and fifty additional lights were added in 1992.

Female jockeys have been allowed to ride at the track since the 1970s.

On 5 August 1992, the racecourse was privatized and ownership given to Hipódromo Argentino de Palermo Sociedad Anónima (HAPSA), in an agreement originally set to last until 2027 and later extended to 2032.

In 2001, the city of Buenos Aires declared the racecourse of cultural interest of the city.

== Facilities ==
The racetrack occupies an area of 60 hectares (150 acres).

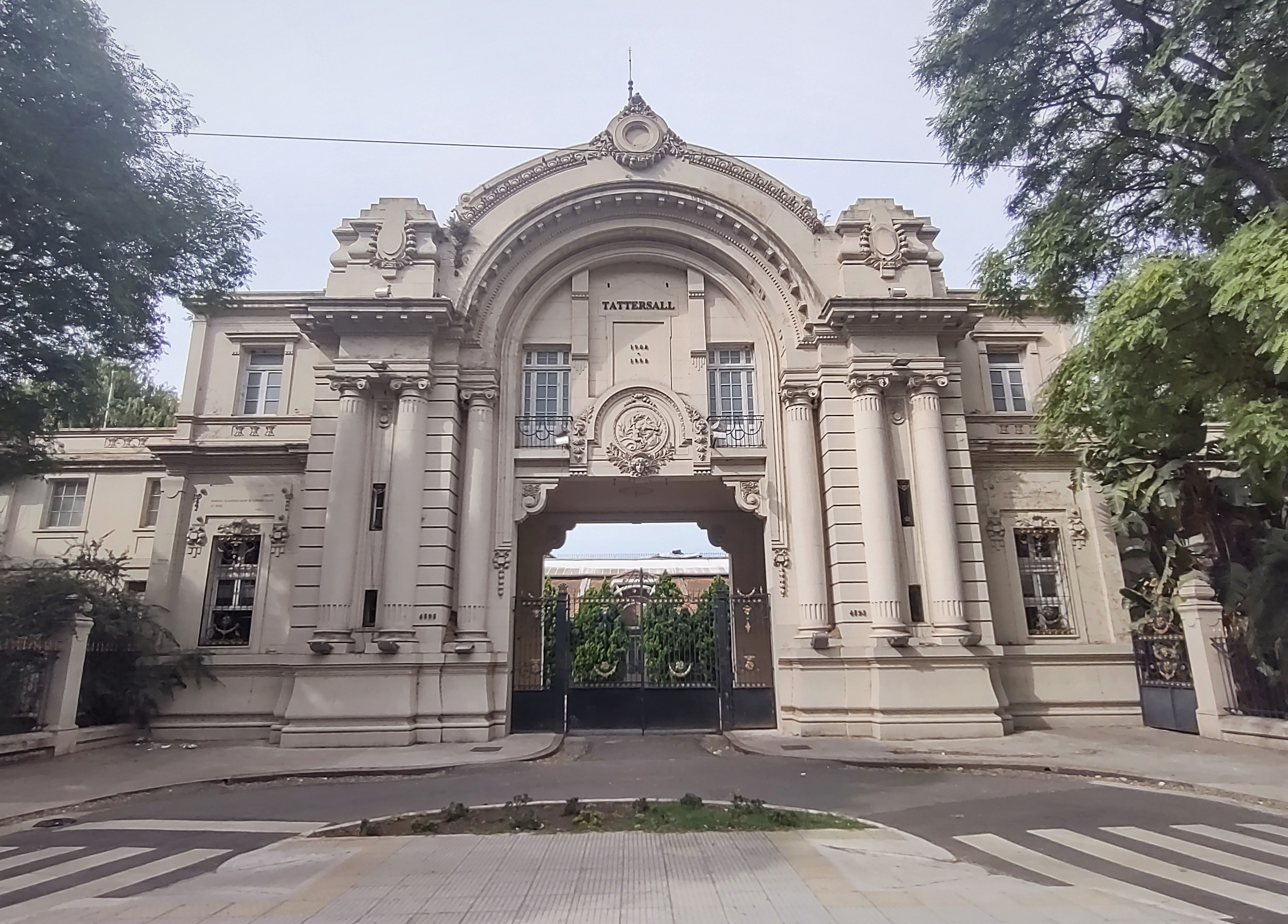
Tattersall, originally an equine sales floor, today hosts social events and weddings

There are 1,473 stalls available for horses in training, including 1,231 permanently available for horses based at the track and 142 for horses coming from other locations.

The course itself consists of three courses, made of eighty percent sand, fourteen percent limestone, and six percent clay, with a special natural drainage system that allows for normal racing to continue on rainy days. The main course is 2,400 metres (1.5 mi) around, 28 metres (31 yd) wide, 600 metres (0.37 mi) from the final turn to the finish line, and a chute allowing for races as long as 1,100 metres (0.68 mi) to be run on a straight line. Up to 21 horses can run in a race at a time. A turf course was added in 2011.

The racecourse has two slot rooms containing a total of over one thousand slot machines and a restaurant. HAPSA has the authority to open up to four thousand five hundred slot machines.

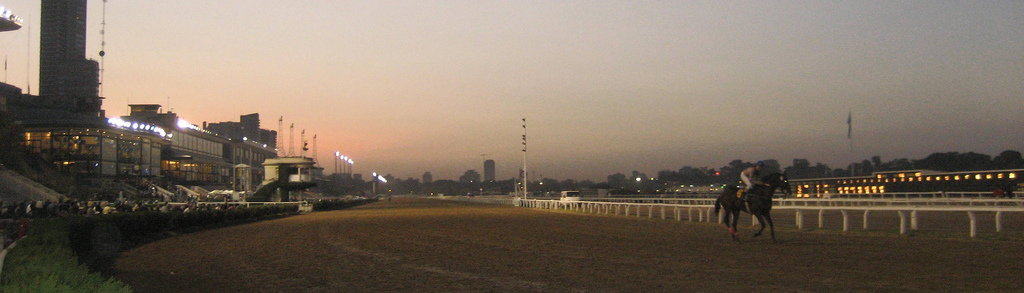
The racecourse

== Important races ==
Group I Races

- Gran Premio Ciudad de Buenos Aires
- Gran Premio Criadores
- Gran Premio General San Martín
- Gran Premio Gilberto Lerena
- Gran Premio Jorge de Atucha
- Gran Premio Maipú
- Gran Premio Montevideo
- Gran Premio Nacional
- Gran Premio Polla de Potrillos
- Gran Premio República Argentina
- Gran Premio Selección

Group II Races

- Gran Premio Apertura
- Gran Premio Arturo R. y A. Bullrich
- Gran Premio Benito Villanueva
- Gran Premio Carlos Tomkinson
- Gran Premio Chacabuco
- Gran Premio Chile
- Gran Premio Comparación
- Gran Premio Eduardo Casey
- Gran Premio Francisco J. Beazley
- Gran Premio General Belgrano
- Gran Premio General Luis María Campos
- Gran Premio Ignacio e I. F. Correas
- Gran Premio Miguel A. y T. Juárez Celman
- Gran Premio Miguel Cané
- Gran Premio Otoño
- Gran Premio Perú
- Gran Premio Ramón Biaus
- Gran Premio Santiago Luro
- Gran Premio Saturnino J. Unzué
- Gran Premio Venezuela
- Gran Premio Vicente L. Casares

Group III Races

- Gran Premio Asociación Propietarios de Caballos de Carrera
- Gran Premio Ayacucho
- Gran Premio Buenos Aires
- Gran Premio Carlos Casares
- Gran Premio Círculo Propietarios de Caballerizas de SPC
- Gran Premio Coronel Miguel F. Martínez
- Gran Premio Coronel Pringles
- Gran Premio Estados Unidos de América
- Gran Premio General Dirtles
- Gran Premio General Francisco B. Bosch
- Gran Premio General Güemes
- Gran Premio General Lavalle
- Gran Premio Guillermo Kemmis
- Gran Premio Inés Victorica Roca
- Gran Premio Irlanda
- Gran Premio Italia
- Gran Premio Lotería de la Ciudad de Buenos Aires
- Gran Premio Manuel J. Guiraldes
- Gran Premio México
- Gran Premio Old Man
- Gran Premio Paraguay
- Gran Premio Pedro E. y Manuel A. Crespo
- Gran Premio República de Panamá
- Gran Premio República Federativa de Brasil
- Gran Premio República Oriental del Uruguay
- Gran Premio Ricardo P. Sauze
