= List of South American Group races =

This is a list of notable flat horse races which take place annually in South America, as listed under review by Organización Sudamericana de Fomento del Sangre Pura de Carrera (OSAF), including races which currently hold black type status.

In addition to the races listed below, the Gran Premio Latinoamericano is a Group One race run annually, switching among tracks in Argentina, Brazil, Chile, Panama, Peru, and Uruguay.

== Argentina ==
=== Group One ===
Race name	Racecourse	Distance	Conditions	Track	Month
Gran Premio Miguel Alfredo Martínez de Hoz	Hipódromo de San Isidro	2000 meters	3yo+	Turf	February
Gran Premio Gilberto Lerena	Hipódromo Argentino de Palermo	2200 meters	3yo+ f	Turf	April
Gran Premio de Honor	Hipódromo Argentino de Palermo	2000 meters	3yo+	Dirt	April
Gran Premio Jorge de Atucha	Hipódromo Argentino de Palermo	1500 meters	2yo f	Dirt	May
Gran Premio Montevideo	Hipódromo Argentino de Palermo	1500 meters	2yo c	Dirt	May
Gran Premio Ciudad de Buenos Aires	Hipódromo Argentino de Palermo	1000 meters	3yo+	Dirt	May
Gran Premio de Las Américas - OSAF	Hipódromo Argentino de Palermo	1600 meters	3yo+	Dirt	May
Gran Premio Criadores	Hipódromo Argentino de Palermo	2000 meters	3yo+ f	Dirt	May
Gran Premio República Argentina	Hipódromo Argentino de Palermo	2000 meters	3yo+	Dirt	May
Gran Premio 25 de Mayo - Copa Dr. Enrique Olivera	Hipódromo de San Isidro	2400 meters	3yo+	Turf	May
Gran Premio de Potrancas	Hipódromo de San Isidro	1600 meters	2yo f	Turf	May
Gran Premio Gran Criterium	Hipódromo de San Isidro	1600 meters	2yo c	Turf	May
Gran Premio Estrellas Juvenile Fillies	Hipódromo Argentino de Palermo	1600 meters	2yo f	Dirt	June
Gran Premio Estrellas Juvenile	Hipódromo Argentino de Palermo	1600 meters	2yo c	Dirt	June
Gran Premio Estrellas Sprint	Hipódromo Argentino de Palermo	1000 meters	3yo+	Dirt	June
Gran Premio Estrellas Mile	Hipódromo Argentino de Palermo	1600 meters	3yo+	Dirt	June
Gran Premio Estrellas Classic	Hipódromo Argentino de Palermo	2000 meters	3yo+	Dirt	June
Gran Premio Estrellas Distaff	Hipódromo Argentino de Palermo	1800 meters	3yo+ f	Dirt	June
Dos Mil Guineas	Hipódromo de San Isidro	1600 meters	3yo c	Turf	July
Gran Premio Polla de Potrancas	Hipódromo Argentino de Palermo	1600 meters	3yo f	Dirt	September
Gran Premio Polla de Potrillos	Hipódromo Argentino de Palermo	1600 meters	3yo c	Dirt	September
Gran Premio General San Martín	Hipódromo Argentino de Palermo	2400 meters	4yo+	Turf	September
Gran Premio Selección de Potrancas	Hipódromo de La Plata	2000 meters	3yo f	Dirt	September
Gran Premio Selección	Hipódromo Argentino de Palermo	2000 meters	3yo f	Dirt	October
Gran Premio Jockey Club	Hipódromo de San Isidro	2000 meters	3yo	Turf	October
Gran Premio San Isidro - Copa Melchor Ángel Posse	Hipódromo de San Isidro	1600 meters	3yo+	Turf	October
Gran Premio Suipacha	Hipódromo de San Isidro	1000 meters	3yo+	Turf	October
Gran Premio Diamante	Hipódromo de San Isidro	1600 meters	3yo f	Turf	October
Gran Premio Copa de Oro - Alfredo Lalor	Hipódromo de San Isidro	2400 meters	4yo+	Turf	November
Gran Premio Enrique Acebal	Hipódromo de San Isidro	2000 meters	3yo f	Turf	November
Gran Premio Nacional	Hipódromo Argentino de Palermo	2500 meters	3yo	Dirt	November
Gran Premio Maipú	Hipódromo Argentino de Palermo	1000 meters	3yo+	Dirt	November
Gran Premio Palermo	Hipódromo Argentino de Palermo	1600 meters	3yo+	Dirt	November
Gran Premio Dardo Rocha	Hipódromo de La Plata	2400 meters	3yo+	Dirt	November
Gran Premio Copa de Plata Roberto Vasquez Mansilla Internacional	Hipódromo de San Isidro	2000 meters	3yo+ f	Turf	December
Gran Premio Carlos Pellegrini Internacional	Hipódromo de San Isidro	2400 meters	3yo+	Turf	December
Gran Premio Félix de Álzaga Unzué Internacional	Hipódromo de San Isidro	1000 meters	3yo+	Turf	December
Gran Premio Joaquín S. de Anchorena Internacional	Hipódromo de San Isidro	1600 meters	3yo+	Turf	December

=== Group Two ===
Race name	Racecourse	Distance	Conditions	Track	Month
Premio Clásico Apertura	Hipódromo Argentino de Palermo	2200 meters	3yo+ f	Turf	January
Clásico Juan Shaw	Hipódromo de San Isidro	2200 meters	3yo+ f	Turf	February
Clásico Horacio Bustillo	Hipódromo de San Isidro	1600 meters	3yo+	Turf	February
Clásico Miguel A. y T. Juárez Celman	Hipódromo Argentino de Palermo	1600 meters	3yo+ f	Turf	February
Clásico Saturnino J. Unzué	Hipódromo Argentino de Palermo	1200 meters	2yo f	Dirt	March
Clásico Santiago Luro	Hipódromo Argentino de Palermo	1200 meters	2yo c	Dirt	March
Clásico Arturo R. y A. Bullrich	Hipódromo Argentino de Palermo	2000 meters	3yo+ f	Dirt	March
Clásico Otoño	Hipódromo Argentino de Palermo	2000 meters	3yo+	Dirt	March
Clásico América	Hipódromo de San Isidro	1600 meters	3yo+	Turf	March
Clásico Ricardo Ezequiel y Ezequiel M. Fernández Guerrico	Hipódromo de San Isidro	1600 meters	3yo+ f	Turf	March
Clásico Benito Villanueva	Hipódromo Argentino de Palermo	1600 meters	3yo+	Dirt	April
Clásico Eliseo Ramírez	Hipódromo de San Isidro	1400 meters	2yo f	Turf	April
Clásico Raúl y Raúl E. Chevallier	Hipódromo de San Isidro	1400 meters	2yo c	Turf	April
Clásico Paseana	Hipódromo de San Isidro	1800 meters	3yo+	Turf	April
Clásico 25 de Mayo de 1810	Hipódromo de La Plata	1600 meters	3yo+	Dirt	May
Clásico Partícula	Hipódromo de San Isidro	2000 meters	3yo+ f	Turf	May
Clásico Forli	Hipódromo de San Isidro	1800 meters	3yo+	Turf	June
Clásico Pippermint	Hipódromo de San Isidro	1400 meters	3yo+	Turf	June
Clásico Omega	Hipódromo de San Isidro	1600 meters	3yo+ f	Turf	June
Clásico Raúl Aristegui	Hipódromo de La Plata	1500 meters	2yo f	Dirt	June
Premio Clásico General Belgrano	Hipódromo Argentino de Palermo	2500 meters	3yo+	Dirt	June
Clásico General Manuel Belgrano	Hipódromo de La Plata	1200 meters	3yo+	Dirt	June
Clásico Pedro Goenaga	Hipódromo de La Plata	1500 meters	2yo c	Dirt	June
Clásico Chacabuco	Hipódromo Argentino de Palermo	2400 meters	4yo+	Turf	July
Clásico Ignacio, Ignacio F. e Ignacio Correas	Hipódromo Argentino de Palermo	2500 meters	4yo+ f	Dirt	July
Clásico 9 de Julio	Hipódromo de San Isidro	1600 meters	4yo+	Turf	July
Clásico Miguel Luis Morales	Hipódromo de La Plata	1600 meters	3yo f	Dirt	July
Clásico Perú	Hipódromo Argentino de Palermo	1800 meters	4yo+	Dirt	July
Clásico General Luis María Campos	Hipódromo Argentino de Palermo	1600 meters	3yo f	Dirt	August
Clásico Miguel Cané	Hipódromo Argentino de Palermo	1600 meters	3yo c	Dirt	August
Clásico Polla de Potrancas	Hipódromo de La Plata	1600 meters	3yo f	Dirt	August
Premio Clásico Comparación	Hipódromo Argentino de Palermo	2400 meters	4yo+	Turf	August
Clásico La Mission	Hipódromo de San Isidro	2000 meters	4yo+ f	Turf	August
Clásico Ecuador	Hipódromo de San Isidro	1600 meters	4yo+	Turf	September
Clásico Francisco J. Beazley	Hipódromo Argentino de Palermo	1800 meters	3yo f	Dirt	September
Premio Clásico Chile	Hipódromo Argentino de Palermo	2200 meters	4yo+ f	Dirt	September
Clásico Cyllene	Hipódromo de San Isidro	1000 meters	3yo+	Turf	September
Clásico Federico de Alvear	Hipódromo de San Isidro	1800 meters	3yo f	Turf	September
Clásico Sibila	Hipódromo de San Isidro	1600 meters	4yo+ f	Turf	September
Clásico Provincia de Buenos Aires	Hipódromo de La Plata	2200 meters	3yo	Dirt	October
Premio Clásico Eduardo Casey	Hipódromo Argentino de Palermo	2200 meters	3yo c	Dirt	October
Clásico Los Haras	Hipódromo de San Isidro	2000 meters	4yo+ f	Turf	October
Clásico Venezuela	Hipódromo Argentino de Palermo	1000 meters	3yo+ f	Dirt	October
Premio Clásico Ramón Biaus	Hipódromo Argentino de Palermo	2200 meters	3yo+ f	Dirt	November
Clásico Carlos P. Rodriguez	Hipódromo de San Isidro	1600 meters	3yo+ f	Turf	November
Clásico Ciudad de La Plata	Hipódromo de La Plata	1200 meters	3yo+	Dirt	November
Clásico Marcos Levalle	Hipódromo de La Plata	1600 meters	3yo+ f	Dirt	November
Clásico Carlos Tomkinson	Hipódromo Argentino de Palermo	1600 meters	3yo+ f	Dirt	November
Gran Premio Joaquín V. González	Hipódromo de La Plata	1600 meters	3yo+	Dirt	November
Clásico Los Criadores	Hipódromo de La Plata	2000 meters	3yo+ f	Dirt	December
Clásico Clausura	Hipódromo de La Plata	2000 meters	3yo+	Dirt	December

=== Group Three ===
Race name	Racecourse	Distance	Conditions	Track	Month
Clásico Buenos Aires	Hipódromo Argentino de Palermo	1600 meters	3yo+	Turf	January
Clásico Botafogo	Hipódromo de San Isidro	2000 meters	3yo+	Turf	January
Clásico General Francisco B. Bosch	Hipódromo Argentino de Palermo	1000 meters	3yo+ f	Dirt	January
Clásico Lucio Taborda	Hipódromo de La Plata	1400 meters	3yo+ f	Dirt	January
Clásico Fortunato Novara	Hipódromo de La Plata	1600 meters	3yo+	Dirt	February
Clásico Carlos Casares	Hipódromo Argentino de Palermo	1000 meters	2yo f	Dirt	February
Clásico Guillermo Kemmis	Hipódromo Argentino de Palermo	1000 meters	2yo c	Dirt	February
Clásico General Viamonte	Hipódromo de San Isidro	1000 meters	3yo+	Turf	February
Clásico General Arenales	Hipódromo Argentino de Palermo	1000 meters	3yo+ f	Dirt	February
Gran Premio Vicente Dupuy Copa Gobierno de San Luis	Hipódromo La Punta	2400 meters	3yo+	Dirt	February
Clásico Arturo A. Bullrich	Hipódromo de La Plata	1200 meters	3yo+ f	Dirt	March
Clásico Irlanda	Hipódromo Argentino de Palermo	1000 meters	3yo+	Dirt	March
Clásico Derli A. Gómez	Hipódromo de La Plata	1200 meters	2yo f	Dirt	March
Clásico Pedro E. y Manuel A. Crespo	Hipódromo Argentino de Palermo	1400 meters	2yo	Dirt	March
Clásico Agustín B. Gambier	Hipódromo de La Plata	1200 meters	2yo c	Dirt	March
Clásico Estados Unidos de América	Hipódromo Argentino de Palermo	1000 meters	3yo+	Dirt	April
Clásico Olavarría	Hipódromo de San Isidro	1000 meters	3yo+ f	Turf	April
Clásico Asociación Bonaerense de Propietarios de Caballos de Carrera	Hipódromo de La Plata	1200 meters	3yo+	Dirt	April
Clásico Fortunato Damiani	Hipódromo de La Plata	1300 meters	2yo f	Dirt	April
Clásico Porteño	Hipódromo de San Isidro	2400 meters	3yo+	Turf	April
Clásico Luis María Doyhenard	Hipódromo de La Plata	1300 meters	2yo c	Dirt	April
Clásico Asociación de Propietarios de Caballos de Carrera	Hipódromo Argentino de Palermo	1400 meters	3yo+ f	Turf	April
Clásico Joaquín V. Maqueda	Hipódromo de La Plata	1400 meters	3yo+ f	Dirt	May
Clásico General Las Heras	Hipódromo de San Isidro	1400 meters	3yo+	Turf	May
Clásico Andrés S. Torres	Hipódromo de La Plata	1400 meters	2yo f	Dirt	May
Clásico Círculo Propietarios de Caballerizas de SPC	Hipódromo Argentino de Palermo	1600 meters	3yo+ f	Dirt	May
Clásico Southern Halo	Hipódromo de San Isidro	1400 meters	3yo+	Turf	May
Clásico Santiago Lawrie	Hipódromo de San Isidro	1000 meters	3yo+	Turf	May
Clásico Asociación de Propietarios de Caballos de Carreras de Buenos Aires	Hipódromo de La Plata	1400 meters	2yo c	Dirt	May
Clásico Velocidad	Hipódromo de San Isidro	1000 meters	2yo	Turf	May
Clásico Coronel Pringles	Hipódromo Argentino de Palermo	1000 meters	3yo+	Dirt	June
Clásico General Lavalle	Hipódromo Argentino de Palermo	1000 meters	2yo	Dirt	June
Clásico República de Panamá	Hipódromo Argentino de Palermo	1000 meters	3yo+ f	Dirt	June
Clásico Estrellas Junior Sprint	Hipódromo Argentino de Palermo	1000 meters	2yo	Dirt	June
Clásico Antonio Cané	Hipódromo de La Plata	2100 meters	3yo+	Dirt	June
Clásico Manuel J. Guiraldes	Hipódromo Argentino de Palermo	1400 meters	3yo f	Dirt	July
Clásico Old Man	Hipódromo Argentino de Palermo	1400 meters	3yo c	Dirt	July
Clásico Inés Victorica Roca	Hipódromo Argentino de Palermo	1600 meters	4yo+ f	Dirt	July
Clásico 9 de Julio - Día de la Independencia	Hipódromo de La Plata	1600 meters	4yo+	Dirt	July
Clásico Isidoro Aramburu	Hipódromo de La Plata	1600 meters	3yo c	Dirt	July
Clásico Eudoro J. Balsa	Hipódromo de San Isidro	1600 meters	4yo+ f	Turf	July
Clásico Polla de Potrillos	Hipódromo de La Plata	1600 meters	3yo c	Dirt	August
Clásico Ocurrencia	Hipódromo de San Isidro	1000 meters	4yo+ f	Turf	August
Clásico Ricardo P. Sauze	Hipódromo Argentino de Palermo	1600 meters	4yo+ f	Dirt	August
Clásico República Federativa de Brasil	Hipódromo Argentino de Palermo	1600 meters	4yo+	Turf	August
Clásico Manuel F. y Emilio Gnecco	Hipódromo de La Plata	1600 meters	4yo+ f	Dirt	August
Clásico General Pueyrredón	Hipódromo de San Isidro	3000 meters	4yo+	Turf	August
Clásico General José de San Martín	Hipódromo de La Plata	1600 meters	4yo+	Dirt	August
Clásico Paraguay	Hipódromo Argentino de Palermo	1000 meters	3yo+	Dirt	August
Clásico Diego White	Hipódromo de La Plata	1700 meters	3yo f	Dirt	August
Clásico México	Hipódromo Argentino de Palermo	1000 meters	3yo+ f	Dirt	August
Clásico José Pedro Ramírez	Hipódromo de La Plata	1700 meters	3yo c	Dirt	August
Clásico Condesa	Hipódromo de San Isidro	1000 meters	3yo+ f	Turf	September
Clásico Coronel Miguel F. Martínez	Hipódromo Argentino de Palermo	1800 meters	3yo c	Dirt	September
Clásico Ensayo Fernando Santamarina	Hipódromo de San Isidro	1800 meters	3yo c	Turf	September
Clásico Hipódromo de La Plata	Hipódromo de La Plata	1600 meters	4yo+	Dirt	September
Clásico Yatasto	Hipódromo de San Isidro	2400 meters	4yo+	Turf	September
Clásico Italia	Hipódromo Argentino de Palermo	2000 meters	4yo+	Dirt	September
Clásico Jockey Club de la Provincia de Buenos Aires	Hipódromo de La Plata	2000 meters	3yo	Dirt	September
Clásico Lotería de la Ciudad de Buenos Aires	Hipódromo Argentino de Palermo	1000 meters	3yo+ f	Dirt	October
Clásico Pedro Chapar	Hipódromo de San Isidro	1400 meters	3yo+	Turf	October
Clásico OSAF	Hipódromo de La Plata	2200 meters	4yo+	Dirt	October
Clásico Hipódromo Independenica de Rosario	Hipódromo de La Plata	2000 meters	4yo+ f	Dirt	October
Premio Clásico Vicente L. Casares	Hipódromo Argentino de Palermo	2500 meters	4yo+	Dirt	October
Clásico de la Provincia de Buenos Aires César Iraola	Hipódromo de San Isidro	2400 meters	3yo	Turf	November
Clásico General Güemes	Hipódromo Argentino de Palermo	1000 meters	3yo+ f	Dirt	December
Clásico República Oriental del Uruguay	Hipódromo Argentino de Palermo	1400 meters	3yo+ f	Turf	December
Clásico Ayacucho	Hipódromo Argentino de Palermo	2500 meters	4yo+	Dirt	December
Clásico Uberto F. Vignart	Hipódromo de La Plata	1200 meters	3yo+	Dirt	December

=== Listed ===
Race name	Racecourse	Distance	Conditions	Track	Month
Clásico Emilio Casares	Hipódromo de La Plata	1200 meters	3yo+	Dirt	January
Clásico Jockey Club Argentino	Hipódromo de La Plata	1400 meters	3yo+	Dirt	January
Clásico Congreve	Hipódromo de San Isidro	1000 meters	2yo	Turf	January
Clásico Haras Ojo De Agua	Hipódromo de San Isidro	1400 meters	3yo+	Turf	January
Clásico Intendente Melchor Posse	Hipódromo Argentino de Palermo	1200 meters	3yo+	Turf	January
Clásico Francia	Hipódromo de San Isidro	1200 meters	3yo+ f	Turf	January
Gran Premio Jorge A. Laffue	Hipódromo La Punta	1800 meters	3yo+	Dirt	January
Clásico Haras Argentinos	Hipódromo Argentino de Palermo	2000 meters	3yo+	Dirt	January
Clásico Amilcar A. Mercader	Hipódromo de La Plata	1000 meters	2yo f	Dirt	February
Clásico Criadores Argentinos del S.P.C	Hipódromo de La Plata	1000 meters	2yo c	Dirt	February
Clásico Rio de La Plata	Hipódromo de San Isidro	1200 meters	3yo+	Turf	February
Clásico Omnium	Hipódromo de San Isidro	1400 meters	3yo+ f	Turf	February
Clásico Antártida Argentina	Hipódromo de San Isidro	1200 meters	2yo	Turf	February
Clásico Comparación	Hipódromo de La Plata	2200 meters	3yo+	Dirt	February
Clásico Calidoscopio	Hipódromo de San Isidro	2400 meters	4yo+	Dirt	February
Clásico Asociación Argentina de Fomento Equino	Hipódromo de San Isidro	1200 meters	3yo+	Turf	March
Clásico El Virtuoso	Hipódromo Argentino de Palermo	1600 meters	3yo+	Dirt	March
Clásico Jamelao	Hipódromo Argentino de Palermo	1400 meters	4yo+ f	Dirt	March
Clásico Regimiento de Granaderos a Caballo	Hipódromo de San Isidro	2200 meters	3yo+	Turf	March
Clásico Onesto Puente	Hipódromo de La Plata	1200 meters	4yo+	Dirt	March
Clásico Expressive Halo	Hipódromo Argentino de Palermo	2200 meters	4yo+	Turf	March
Clásico Islas Malvinas	Hipódromo de San Isidro	1000 meters	2yo	Turf	April
Clásico Lord at War	Hipódromo de San Isidro	1200 meters	3yo+	Dirt	April
Clásico Mesa del Senado	Hipódromo de San Isidro	1400 meters	3yo+	Turf	April
Clásico Macon	Hipódromo de San Isidro	1800 meters	3yo+	Turf	April
Clásico España	Hipódromo Argentino de Palermo	1000 meters	4yo+ f	Dirt	May
Clásico Blend	Hipódromo Argentino de Palermo	1600 meters	4yo+	Turf	May
Clásico Julio Corte	Hipódromo de La Plata	1100 meters	3yo+	Dirt	May
Clásico Malvinas Argentinas	Hipódromo Argentino de Palermo	2000 meters	3yo+	Dirt	May
Clásico Manuel Anasagasti	Hipódromo de San Isidro	1400 meters	2yo	Turf	June
Clásico Prensa Hípica	Hipódromo Argentino de Palermo	1000 meters	4yo+	Dirt	June
Clásico Cocles	Hipódromo de San Isidro	2400 meters	4yo+	Turf	July
Clásico Guillermo Paats	Hipódromo Argentino de Palermo	1000 meters	3yo	Dirt	July
Clásico Producción Nacional	Hipódromo de San Isidro	1000 meters	4yo+ f	Turf	July
Clásico Club Hípico de Tandil	Hipódromo de La Plata	1100 meters	3yo c	Dirt	July
Clásico Japón	Hipódromo Argentino de Palermo	1400 meters	4yo+	Turf	July
Clásico Necochea	Hipódromo de San Isidro	1000 meters	4yo+	Turf	July
Clásico Espirita	Hipódromo de San Isidro	2000 meters	4yo+ f	Turf	July
Clásico Otelo A. Orlandi	Hipódromo de La Plata	1600 meters	4yo+ f	Dirt	July
Clásico Bayakoa	Hipódromo de San Isidro	1400 meters	3yo f	Turf	July
Clásico Wilfredo Latham	Hipódromo de La Plata	1100 meters	3yo f	Dirt	August
Clásico Jockey Club de Azul	Hipódromo de La Plata	1100 meters	3yo c	Dirt	August
Clásico Lamadrid	Hipódromo de San Isidro	1000 meters	4yo+	Turf	August
Clásico Propietarios	Hipódromo de San Isidro	1000 meters	3yo	Turf	August
Clásico Reconquista	Hipódromo de San Isidro	1400 meters	4yo+	Turf	August
Clásico Aniversario Hipódromo La Punta	Hipódromo La Punta	1600 meters	3yo+	Dirt	August
Clásico Refinado Tom	Hipódromo de San Isidro	1200 meters	4yo+	Dirt	September
Clásico Raúl Lottero	Hipódromo de La Plata	1200 meters	3yo f	Dirt	September
Clásico Domingo Faustino Sarmiento	Hipódromo de San Isidro	2400 meters	4yo+	Dirt	September
Clásico José M. Boquin	Hipódromo de La Plata	1200 meters	3yo c	Dirt	September
Clásico Etoile	Hipódromo de San Isidro	1200 meters	4yo+ f	Dirt	September
Clásico Stud Book Argentino	Hipódromo de La Plata	2200 meters	4yo+	Dirt	September
Clásico Asociación Cooperativa de Criadores Ltda.	Hipódromo Argentino de Palermo	1400 meters	3yo f	Turf	September
Clásico Benito Lynch	Hipódromo de La Plata	1200 meters	3yo c	Dirt	October
Clásico Candy Ride	Hipódromo de San Isidro	1400 meters	3yo	Turf	October
Clásico España	Hipódromo de La Plata	1200 meters	4yo+	Dirt	October
Clásico Jockey Club de Venezuela	Hipódromo de La Plata	1400 meters	4yo+	Dirt	October
Clásico Carlos Gardel	Hipódromo Argentino de Palermo	1800 meters	4yo+	Dirt	October
Clásico Orbit	Hipódromo de San Isidro	1400 meters	4yo+ f	Dirt	October
Clásico The Japan Racing Association	Hipódromo Argentino de Palermo	1400 meters	3yo+ f	Turf	October
Clásico Eusonio C. Boni	Hipódromo de La Plata	1100 meters	3yo f	Dirt	October
Clásico Orange	Hipódromo de San Isidro	1400 meters	4yo+	Dirt	October
Clásico Irineo Leguisamo	Hipódromo Argentino de Palermo	2000 meters	4yo+	Dirt	November
Clásico La Troienne	Hipódromo de San Isidro	1000 meters	3yo+ f	Turf	November
Clásico Embrujo	Hipódromo de San Isidro	1600 meters	3yo+	Turf	November
Clásico Mineral	Hipódromo Argentino de Palermo	2500 meters	4yo+	Dirt	November
Clásico Asociación Cooperativa Criadores Caballos de S.P.C. Ltda	Hipódromo de La Plata	1100 meters	3yo+ f	Dirt	November
Clásico Melgarejo	Hipódromo de San Isidro	1400 meters	3yo+ f	Turf	December
Clásico Urbano de Iriondo	Hipódromo de San Isidro	1400 meters	3yo+	Turf	December
Clásico Gobierno de la Ciudad de Buenos Aires	Hipódromo Argentino de Palermo	1800 meters	4yo+	Dirt	December
Clásico Tresiete	Hipódromo de San Isidro	2000 meters	3yo+	Turf	December
Clásico Latency	Hipódromo de San Isidro	1200 meters	3yo+	Dirt	December
Clásico General Alvear	Hipódromo Argentino de Palermo	1000 meters	3yo+ f	Dirt	December
Clásico Luis Monteverde	Hipódromo de La Plata	1400 meters	3yo+ f	Dirt	December
Clásico Oswaldo Aranha	Hipódromo de La Plata	1600 meters	3yo+	Dirt	December
Clásico Invasor	Hipódromo de San Isidro	1400 meters	3yo+	Turf	December

== Brazil ==
=== Group One ===
Race name	Racecourse	Distance	Conditions	Track	Month
Grande Prêmio Estado do Rio de Janeiro	Hipódromo da Gávea	1600 meters	3yo c	Turf	February
Grande Prêmio Henrique Possollo	Hipódromo da Gávea	1600 meters	3yo f	Turf	February
Grande Prêmio Diana	Hipódromo da Gávea	2000 meters	3yo f	Turf	March
Grande Prêmio Francisco Eduardo e Linneo Eduardo de Paula Machado	Hipódromo da Gávea	2000 meters	3yo c	Turf	March
Grande Prêmio Cruzeiro do Sul (Brazilian Derby)	Hipódromo da Gávea	2400 meters	3yo	Turf	April
Grande Prêmio Zélia Gonzaga Peixoto de Castro	Hipódromo da Gávea	2400 meters	3yo f	Turf	April
Grande Prêmio Juliano Martins	Hipódromo Cidade Jardim	1500 meters	2yo	Turf	May
Grande Prêmio João Cecílio Ferraz	Hipódromo Cidade Jardim	1500 meters	2yo f	Turf	May
Grande Prêmio A.B.C.P.C.C.	Hipódromo Cidade Jardim	1000 meters	2yo+	Turf	May
Grande Prêmio O.S.A.F. - Organizacion Sudamericana de Fomento del Sangre Pura de Carrera	Hipódromo Cidade Jardim	2000 meters	3yo+ f	Turf	May
Grande Prêmio São Paulo	Hipódromo Cidade Jardim	2400 meters	3yo+	Turf	May
Grande Prêmio Jockey Club Brasileiro	Hipódromo da Gávea	1600 meters	2yo c	Turf	June
Grande Prêmio Major Suckow	Hipódromo da Gávea	1000 meters	3yo+	Turf	June
Grande Prêmio Brasil	Hipódromo da Gávea	2400 meters	4yo+	Turf	June
Grande Prêmio Presidente da República	Hipódromo da Gávea	1600 meters	3yo+	Turf	June
Grande Prêmio Roberto e Nelson Grimaldi Seabra	Hipódromo da Gávea	2000 meters	4yo+ f	Turf	June
Grande Prêmio Margarida Polak Lara - Taça de Prata	Hipódromo da Gávea	1600 meters	3yo f	Turf	August
Grande Prêmio João Adhemar de Almeida Prado - Taça de Prata	Hipódromo da Gávea	1600 meters	3yo c	Turf	August
Grande Prêmio Mathias Machline - ABCPCC Clássica	Hipódromo da Gávea	2000 meters	3yo+	Turf	August
Grande Prêmio Ipiranga	Hipódromo Cidade Jardim	1600 meters	3yo c	Turf	September
Grande Prêmio Barão de Piracicaba	Hipódromo Cidade Jardim	1600 meters	3yo f	Turf	September
Grande Prêmio Jockey Club de São Paulo	Hipódromo Cidade Jardim	2000 meters	3yo c	Turf	October
Grande Prêmio Henrique de Toledo Lara	Hipódromo Cidade Jardim	1800 meters	3yo f	Turf	October
Grande Prêmio Derby Paulista	Hipódromo Cidade Jardim	2400 meters	3yo c	Turf	November
Grande Prêmio Diana	Hipódromo Cidade Jardim	2000 meters	3yo f	Turf	November
Grande Prêmio Linneo de Paula Machado	Hipódromo da Gávea	2000 meters	3yo c	Turf	December

=== Group Two ===
Race name	Racecourse	Distance	Conditions	Track	Month
Grande Prêmio 25 de Janeiro - 471º Aniversário de São Paulo	Hipódromo Cidade Jardim	2000 meters	3yo+ f	Dirt	January
Grande Prêmio Presidente Hernani Azevedo Silva	Hipódromo Cidade Jardim	1600 meters	3yo+ f	Turf	January
Grande Prêmio Presidente Luiz Oliveira de Barros	Hipódromo Cidade Jardim	1800 meters	3yo+ f	Turf	February
Grande Prêmio Presidente do Conselho do Jockey Club	Hipódromo Cidade Jardim	1600 meters	3yo+	Turf	March
Grande Prêmio Conde de Herzberg	Hipódromo da Gávea	1400 meters	2yo c	Turf	March
Grande Prêmio Prefeito Fabio da Silva Prado	Hipódromo Cidade Jardim	2000 meters	3yo+ f	Turf	March
Grande Prêmio Presidente José de Souza Queiroz	Hipódromo Cidade Jardim	1400 meters	2yo	Turf	April
Grande Prêmio Guilherme Ellis	Hipódromo Cidade Jardim	1400 meters	2yo f	Turf	April
Grande Prêmio José Carlos Fragoso Pires	Hipódromo da Gávea	2000 meters	3yo+ f	Turf	April
Grande Prêmio Gervásio Seabra	Hipódromo da Gávea	1600 meters	3yo+	Turf	April
Grande Prêmio Antonio Joaquim Peixoto de Castro Jr.	Hipódromo da Gávea	2400 meters	3yo+	Turf	April
Grande Prêmio Presidente da República	Hipódromo Cidade Jardim	1600 meters	3yo+	Turf	May
Grande Prêmio Nove de Maio	Hipódromo da Gávea	2400 meters	3yo+	Turf	May
Grande Prêmio Francisco Vilella de Paula Machado	Hipódromo da Gávea	1500 meters	2yo f	Turf	June
Grande Prêmio Onze de Julho	Hipódromo da Gávea	1600 meters	3yo+ f	Turf	June
Grande Prêmio Duque de Caxias	Hipódromo da Gávea	2000 meters	3yo+ f	Turf	August
Grande Prêmio Doutor Frontin	Hipódromo da Gávea	2400 meters	3yo+	Turf	September
Grande Prêmio Salgado Filho	Hipódromo da Gávea	1600 meters	3yo+	Dirt	September
Grande Prêmio Cordeiro da Graça	Hipódromo da Gávea	1000 meters	2yo+	Turf	October
Grande Prêmio João Borges Filho	Hipódromo da Gávea	2400 meters	3yo+	Turf	October
Grande Prêmio Rocha Faria	Hipódromo da Gávea	2000 meters	3yo f	Turf	October
Grande Prêmio Marciano de Aguiar Moreira	Hipódromo da Gávea	2000 meters	3yo+ f	Turf	October
Grande Prêmio Júlio Capua	Hipódromo da Gávea	1600 meters	3yo+	Turf	October
Grande Prêmio Bento Gonçalves	Hipodromo do Cristal	2400 meters	3yo+	Dirt	October
Grande Prêmio Conde Silvio Alvares Penteado	Hipódromo Cidade Jardim	2000 meters	3yo+ f	Turf	November
Grande Prêmio Governador do Estado	Hipódromo Cidade Jardim	1600 meters	3yo+	Turf	November
Grande Prêmio Proclamação da República	Hipódromo Cidade Jardim	1000 meters	3yo+	Turf	November
Grande Prêmio Ministério da Agricultura	Hipódromo Cidade Jardim	2400 meters	3yo+	Turf	November
Grande Prêmio Almirante Marquês de Tamandaré	Hipódromo da Gávea	2400 meters	3yo+	Turf	November
Grande Prêmio Oswaldo Aranha	Hipódromo da Gávea	2000 meters	3yo+ f	Turf	December
Grande Prêmio Presidente José Bonifácio Coutinho Nogueira	Hipódromo Cidade Jardim	2400 meters	3yo+ f	Turf	December
Copa dos Campeões	Hipódromo Cidade Jardim	2000 meters	3yo+	Turf	December

=== Group Three ===
Race name	Racecourse	Distance	Conditions	Track	Month
Grande Prêmio Roger Guedon	Hipódromo da Gávea	1600 meters	3yo f	Turf	January
Grande Prêmio José Buarque de Macedo	Hipódromo da Gávea	1600 meters	3yo c	Turf	January
Grande Prêmio Piratininga	Hipódromo Cidade Jardim	1600 meters	3yo+	Dirt	January
Grande Prêmio Prefeitura da Cidade do Rio de Janeiro	Hipódromo da Gávea	1900 meters	3yo+	Dirt	January
Grande Prêmio Linneo de Paula Machado	Hipódromo Cidade Jardim	2000 meters	3yo+	Turf	February
Grande Prêmio Escorial	Hipódromo da Gávea	2000 meters	3yo+	Turf	February
Grande Prêmio Hipodromo da Gávea	Hipódromo da Gávea	1000 meters	3yo+	Turf	February
Grande Prêmio Presidente José Cerquinho de Assumpção	Hipódromo Cidade Jardim	1600 meters	3yo+	Turf	February
Grande Prêmio Chanceler Oswaldo Aranha	Hipódromo Cidade Jardim	2200 meters	3yo+	Dirt	February
Grande Prêmio 14 de Março - 150º Aniversário do Jockey Club	Hipódromo Cidade Jardim	2400 meters	3yo+	Turf	March
Grande Prêmio Presidente José Antonio Pamplona de Andrade	Hipódromo Cidade Jardim	1300 meters	2yo f	Turf	March
Grande Prêmio Doutor Enio Buffolo	Hipódromo Cidade Jardim	1300 meters	2yo	Turf	March
Grande Prêmio Luiz Fernando C. Lima	Hipódromo da Gávea	2000 meters	3yo+	Turf	March
Grande Prêmio Euvaldo Lodi	Hipódromo da Gávea	1600 meters	3yo+ f	Turf	March
Grande Prêmio Riboletta	Hipódromo da Gávea	1200 meters	3yo+ f	Turf	March
Grande Prêmio Presidente Vargas	Hipódromo da Gávea	1600 meters	3yo+	Turf	March
Grande Prêmio Adayr E. de Araujo	Hipódromo da Gávea	1400 meters	2yo f	Turf	March
Grande Prêmio Professor Nova Monteiro	Hipódromo da Gávea	1900 meters	3yo+	Turf	March
Grande Prêmio Mário de Azevedo Ribeiro	Hipódromo da Gávea	1000 meters	2yo c	Turf	April
Grande Prêmio Presidente Waldyr Prudente de Toledo	Hipódromo Cidade Jardim	1000 meters	3yo+	Turf	April
Grande Prêmio Presidente Augusto de Souza Queiroz	Hipódromo Cidade Jardim	1400 meters	2yo	Dirt	May
Grande Prêmio Presidente Raphael Aguiar Paes de Barros	Hipódromo Cidade Jardim	2400 meters	3yo+	Turf	May
Grande Prêmio José Paulino Nogueira	Hipódromo Cidade Jardim	2400 meters	3yo+ f	Turf	May
Grande Prêmio Presidente João Carlos Leite Penteado	Hipódromo Cidade Jardim	1400 meters	2yo+ f	Dirt	May
Grande Prêmio Antenor Lara Campos	Hipódromo Cidade Jardim	1500 meters	2yo	Dirt	June
Grande Prêmio ABCPCC - Taça Stud Book Brasileiro	Hipódromo da Gávea	2500 meters	3yo+	Turf	June
Grande Prêmio Presidente Antonio Teixeira de Assumpção Netto	Hipódromo Cidade Jardim	1400 meters	3yo+ f	Turf	July
Grande Prêmio General Couto de Magalhães	Hipódromo Cidade Jardim	3218 meters	4yo+	Turf	August
Grande Prêmio Presidente Roberto Alves de Almeida	Hipódromo Cidade Jardim	1600 meters	3yo+ f	Dirt	August
Grande Prêmio Mário Belmonte Moglia	Hipódromo Cidade Jardim	1000 meters	3yo+	Turf	August
Grande Prêmio Copa Japão de Turfe	Hipódromo Cidade Jardim	1600 meters	3yo+ f	Turf	September
Grande Prêmio Independencia	Hipódromo Cidade Jardim	1000 meters	3yo+ f	Turf	September
Grande Prêmio Adhemar e Roberto G. de Faria	Hipódromo da Gávea	1000 meters	3yo+	Turf	September
Grande Prêmio Sandpit	Hipódromo da Gávea	2000 meters	3yo c	Turf	September
Grande Prêmio João José e José Carlos de Figueiredo	Hipódromo da Gávea	1600 meters	3yo+	Dirt	September
Grande Prêmio Luiz Fernando Cirne Lima	Hipódromo Cidade Jardim	1800 meters	3yo+ f	Turf	October
Grande Prêmio Alberto Santos Dumont	Hipódromo Cidade Jardim	1600 meters	3yo+	Turf	October
Grande Prêmio Presidente Marcio Correa de Toledo	Hipódromo Cidade Jardim	1000 meters	3yo+	Turf	October
Grande Prêmio Criadores e Proprietários de Cavalos de Corrida de São Paulo	Hipódromo Cidade Jardim	2400 meters	3yo+	Turf	October
Grande Prêmio Presidente Antonio Correa Barbosaa	Hipódromo Cidade Jardim	2200 meters	3yo+	Dirt	October
Grande Prêmio Guilherme F. Penteado	Hipódromo da Gávea	1600 meters	3yo+	Turf	November
Grande Prêmio Costa Ferraz	Hipódromo da Gávea	1000 meters	3yo+ f	Turf	November
Grande Prêmio Octávio Dupont	Hipódromo da Gávea	1600 meters	3yo f	Turf	November
Grande Prêmio Ernani de Freitas	Hipódromo da Gávea	1600 meters	3yo c	Turf	November
Grande Prêmio Presidente Antonio Grisi Filho	Hipódromo Cidade Jardim	1600 meters	3yo+ f	Dirt	November
Grande Prêmio Paraná	Hipódromo do Tarumã	2000 meters	3yo+	Turf	December
Grande Prêmio Consagração	Hipódromo Cidade Jardim	2800 meters	3yo+	Turf	December
Grande Prêmio Frederico Lundgren	Hipódromo da Gávea	1600 meters	3yo c	Turf	December
Grande Prêmio Mariano Procópio	Hipódromo da Gávea	1600 meters	3yo f	Turf	December

=== Listed ===
Race name	Racecourse	Distance	Conditions	Track	Month
Grande Prêmio Thomaz Teixeira de Assumpção Netto	Hipódromo Cidade Jardim	1300 meters	3yo+ f	Dirt	January
Grande Prêmio Bal a Bali	Hipódromo da Gávea	1600 meters	3yo+	Turf	January
Grande Prêmio Antônio Carlos Amorim	Hipódromo da Gávea	2000 meters	3yo+ f	Turf	February
Grande Prêmio Presidente Luiz Nazareno Teixeira de Assumpção	Hipódromo Cidade Jardim	1500 meters	3yo+ f	Dirt	March
Grande Prêmio Presidente Eduardo da Rocha Azevedo	Hipódromo Cidade Jardim	1300 meters	2yo	Dirt	March
Grande Prêmio Erasmo Teixeira de Assumpção	Hipódromo Cidade Jardim	1000 meters	3yo+ f	Turf	April
Grande Prêmio Alfredo Grumser	Hipódromo da Gávea	1000 meters	3yo+	Turf	April
Grande Prêmio Imprensa	Hipódromo Cidade Jardim	1600 meters	3yo+ f	Dirt	April
Clássico Luiz Gurgel do Amaral Valente	Hipódromo do Tarumã	1200 meters	2yo	Turf	April
Grande Prêmio Presidente Herculano de Freitas	Hipódromo Cidade Jardim	1000 meters	2yo	Turf	May
Grande Prêmio Presidente Vicente Renato Paolillo	Hipódromo Cidade Jardim	1300 meters	2yo f	Dirt	May
Grande Prêmio Presidente João Tobias de Aguiar	Hipódromo Cidade Jardim	1200 meters	3yo+	Dirt	May
Grande Prêmio Delegações Turfísticas	Hipódromo Cidade Jardim	2200 meters	3yo+	Dirt	May
Grande Prêmio Adil	Hipódromo Cidade Jardim	3000 meters	3yo+	Turf	May
Grande Prêmio Eurico Solanés	Hipódromo da Gávea	1500 meters	3yo+	Dirt	May
Grande Prêmio Ministerio da Agricultura	Hipódromo da Gávea	1500 meters	2yo f	Turf	May
Grande Prêmio José Calmon	Hipódromo da Gávea	1500 meters	2yo c	Turf	May
Grande Prêmio Marcos Ribas de Faria	Hipódromo da Gávea	2000 meters	3yo+ f	Turf	May
Grande Prêmio Jockey Club de São Paulo	Hipódromo da Gávea	1000 meters	3yo+	Turf	May
Grande Prêmio Itajara	Hipódromo da Gávea	1600 meters	3yo+	Turf	May
Grande Prêmio Candido Egydio de Souza Aranha	Hipódromo Cidade Jardim	1800 meters	3yo+	Turf	May
Clássico A.B.C.P.C.C.	Hipódromo do Tarumã	1400 meters	2yo	Dirt	May
Grande Prêmio Edmundo Pires de Oliveira Dias	Hipódromo Cidade Jardim	1300 meters	2yo+ f	Turf	June
Grande Prêmio Delegações Turfísticas	Hipódromo da Gávea	1900 meters	3yo+	Dirt	June
Grande Prêmio Breno Caldas - Taça Criação Gaúcha	Hipódromo da Gávea	1400 meters	3yo+	Dirt	June
Grande Prêmio Luiz Gurgel do Amaral Valente - Taça Criação Paranaense	Hipódromo da Gávea	1300 meters	2yo+ f	Dirt	June
Grande Prêmio OSAF	Hipódromo da Gávea	1400 meters	3yo+ f	Turf	June
Grande Prêmio Imprensa	Hipódromo da Gávea	1000 meters	2yo c	Dirt	June
Clássico Derby Paranaense	Hipódromo do Tarumã	2000 meters	3yo	Dirt	June
Clássico Alô Ticoulat Guimarães	Hipódromo do Tarumã	1400 meters	2yo f	Dirt	June
Clássico Criadores - Criterium Paranaense	Hipódromo do Tarumã	1600 meters	2yo	Dirt	June
Grande Prêmio Luiz e José Vieira de Carvalho Mesquita	Hipódromo Cidade Jardim	2000 meters	4yo+	Turf	June
Grande Prêmio Emerald Hill	Hipódromo Cidade Jardim	1600 meters	3yo f	Turf	July
Grande Prêmio Farwell	Hipódromo Cidade Jardim	1600 meters	3yo	Turf	July
Grande Prêmio Secretário de Estado da Agricultura	Hipódromo Cidade Jardim	1600 meters	4yo+	Turf	July
Copa ABCPCC Regional	Hipodromo do Cristal	1600 meters	3yo	Dirt	July
Grande Prêmio Presidente Julio Mesquita	Hipódromo Cidade Jardim	2400 meters	4yo+	Dirt	August
Grande Prêmio Presidente Luiz Alves de Almeida	Hipódromo Cidade Jardim	1000 meters	3yo+ f	Turf	August
Grande Prêmio Luiz Rigoni	Hipódromo da Gávea	1500 meters	3yo+	Turf	August
Grande Prêmio Derby Club	Hipódromo da Gávea	3000 meters	4yo+	Turf	August
Grande Prêmio Prefeito de São Paulo	Hipódromo Cidade Jardim	1600 meters	3yo+	Turf	September
Grande Prêmio Conselheiro Antonio da Silva Prado	Hipódromo Cidade Jardim	2400 meters	4yo+	Turf	September
Grande Prêmio Ghadeer	Hipódromo da Gávea	2000 meters	3yo f	Turf	September
Grande Prêmio Paulo José da Costa e Professor Doutor Paulo José da Costa Junior	Hipódromo Cidade Jardim	1900 meters	3yo+ f	Dirt	September
Grande Prêmio Ricardo Lara Vidigal	Hipódromo Cidade Jardim	2200 meters	3yo	Dirt	September
Grande Prêmio Nelson de Almeida Prado	Hipódromo Cidade Jardim	1400 meters	3yo+	Dirt	September
Grande Prêmio Protetora do Turfe	Hipódromo do Cristal	2200 meters	3yo+	Dirt	September
Grande Prêmio Emerson	Hipódromo Cidade Jardim	2400 meters	3yo	Turf	October
Grande Prêmio Much Better	Hipódromo da Gávea	1900 meters	3yo+	Dirt	November
Grande Prêmio Presidente João Domingos Sampaio	Hipódromo Cidade Jardim	2800 meters	3yo+	Turf	November
Grande Prêmio Armando Rodrigues Carneiro	Hipódromo da Gávea	1600 meters	3yo+ f	Turf	November
Grande Prêmio São Francisco Xavier	Hipódromo da Gávea	1200 meters	3yo+	Dirt	November
Grande Prêmio Presidente da República	Hipodromo do Cristal	1600 meters	3yo+	Dirt	November
Grande Prêmio Natal	Hipódromo Cidade Jardim	1900 meters	3yo+ f	Dirt	December
Grande Prêmio Encerramento	Hipódromo Cidade Jardim	1200 meters	3yo+ f	Dirt	December
Clássico Governador do Estado	Hipódromo do Tarumã	1600 meters	3yo+	Dirt	December
Clássico Primavera	Hipódromo do Tarumã	1800 meters	3yo+ f	Turf	December
Clássico Ciro Frare	Hipódromo do Tarumã	1200 meters	3yo+	Turf	December

== Chile ==
=== Group One ===
Race name	Racecourse	Distance	Conditions	Track	Month
Clásico El Derby	Valparaiso Sporting Club	2400 meters	3yo	Turf	February
Gran Premio Hipódromo Chile	Hipódromo Chile	2200 meters	3yo+	Dirt	May
Clásico Club Hípico de Santiago - Falabella	Club Hípico de Santiago	2000 meters	3yo+	Turf	May
Clásico Arturo Lyon Peña	Club Hípico de Santiago	1600 meters	2yo f	Turf	June
Clásico Alberto Vial Infante	Club Hípico de Santiago	1600 meters	2yo c	Turf	June
Gran Premio Tanteo de Potrancas	Hipódromo Chile	1500 meters	2yo f	Dirt	June
Tanteo de Potrillos	Hipódromo Chile	1500 meters	2yo c	Dirt	June
Clásico Polla de Potrancas (Joaquin Morande T.)	Club Hípico de Santiago	1700 meters	3yo f	Turf	August
Clásico Polla de Potrillos (Roberto Allende U.)	Club Hípico de Santiago	1700 meters	3yo c	Turf	August
Mil Guineas María Luisa Solari Falabella	Hipódromo Chile	1600 meters	3yo f	Dirt	August
Dos Mil Guineas	Hipódromo Chile	1600 meters	3yo	Dirt	September
Gran Criterium Mauricio Serrano Palma	Hipódromo Chile	1900 meters	3yo	Dirt	October
Clásico Nacional Ricardo Lyon	Club Hípico de Santiago	2000 meters	3yo	Turf	October
Clásico El Ensayo	Club Hípico de Santiago	2400 meters	3yo	Turf	October
Gran Premio Alberto Solari Magnasco	Hipódromo Chile	2000 meters	3yo f	Dirt	November
Clásico Las Oaks	Club Hípico de Santiago	2000 meters	3yo f	Turf	December
Clásico St. Leger	Hipódromo Chile	2200 meters	3yo	Dirt	December

=== Group Two ===
Race name	Racecourse	Distance	Conditions	Track	Month
Copa Jackson	Valparaiso Sporting Club	1900 meters	3yo	Turf	January
Clásico Verano - Arturo Cousiño L.	Club Hípico de Santiago	2000 meters	3yo+	Turf	February
Gran Clásico Coronación (Pablo Baraona U.)	Club Hípico de Santiago	2000 meters	3yo	Turf	March
Clásico Fernando Moller Bordeu	Hipódromo Chile	1600 meters	3yo+	Dirt	April
Clásico Otoño - Pedro García de la Huerta	Club Hípico de Santiago	2000 meters	3yo+	Turf	April
Clásico El Estreno Nicanor Señoret	Valparaiso Sporting Club	1300 meters	2yo	Turf	April
Clásico Carlos Campino L.	Club Hípico de Santiago	1800 meters	3yo+ f	Turf	May
Gran Premio Gonzalo Bofill de Caso	Valparaiso Sporting Club	1400 meters	2yo	Turf	May
Clásico Criadores Machos - Marcel Zarour A.	Club Hípico de Santiago	1600 meters	2yo c	Turf	May
Clásico Criadores Hembras - Carlos Hirmas A.	Club Hípico de Santiago	1600 meters	2yo f	Turf	May
Gran Premio de Honor	Hipódromo Chile	2400 meters	3yo+	Dirt	May
Gran Premio Criadores Eugenio Zegers León	Hipódromo Chile	1600 meters	2yo c	Dirt	June
Gran Premio Criadores Salvador Hess Riveros	Hipódromo Chile	1500 meters	2yo f	Dirt	June
Copa de Plata Italo Traverso P.	Valparaiso Sporting Club	1600 meters	2yo	Turf	June
Clásico Francisco Baeza S.	Club Hípico de Santiago	2000 meters	3yo+ f	Turf	June
Clásico Domingo Segundo Herrera Martínez	Hipódromo Chile	1500 meters	3yo c	Dirt	July
Copa de Oro (María Luisa Solari F.)	Club Hípico de Santiago	2000 meters	3yo+	Turf	August
Clásico Fernando Coloma Reyes	Hipódromo Chile	1800 meters	3yo f	Dirt	October
Clásico Haras de Chile Marcel Zarour Atanacio	Hipódromo Chile	2000 meters	3yo+ f	Dirt	November

=== Group Three ===
Race name	Racecourse	Distance	Conditions	Track	Month
Clásico Alberto Solari M.	Valparaiso Sporting Club	1600 meters	3yo f	Turf	February
Clásico Thompson Matthews	Valparaiso Sporting Club	1600 meters	3yo	Turf	February
Clásico Julio Castro Ruiz	Hipódromo Chile	2000 meters	3yo+	Dirt	March
Clásico Selección de Potrancas	Hipódromo Chile	1200 meters	2yo f	Dirt	March
Clásico Municipal de Viña del Mar (Handicap Libre)	Valparaiso Sporting Club	1900 meters	3yo+	Turf	March
Clásico Selección de Potrillos	Hipódromo Chile	1200 meters	2yo c	Dirt	March
Clásico Pedro Del Río Talavera	Hipódromo Chile	2200 meters	3yo+	Dirt	March
Clásico Juan Cavieres Mella	Hipódromo Chile	1300 meters	2yo f	Dirt	April
Clásico Ignacio Urrutia de la Sotta e Ignacio Urrutia del Río	Hipódromo Chile	1300 meters	2yo c	Dirt	April
Clásico Cotejo de Potrancas	Club Hípico de Santiago	1300 meters	2yo f	Turf	April
Clásico Cotejo de Potrillos	Club Hípico de Santiago	1300 meters	2yo c	Turf	April
Clásico Alvaro Covarrubias P.	Club Hípico de Santiago	1600 meters	2yo c	Turf	May
Clásico Julio Subercaseaux B.	Club Hípico de Santiago	1600 meters	2yo f	Turf	May
Clásico José Saavedra Baeza	Hipódromo Chile	1500 meters	2yo f	Dirt	May
Clásico Víctor Matetic Fernández*	Hipódromo Chile	1500 meters	2yo c	Dirt	May
Clásico Carlos Valdés I.	Club Hípico de Santiago	1600 meters	3yo f	Turf	July
Clásico Raimundo Valdés C.	Club Hípico de Santiago	1600 meters	3yo c	Turf	July
Clásico Invierno - Sergio Del Sante M.	Club Hípico de Santiago	2000 meters	3yo+	Turf	July
Clásico Carlos Allende Navarro y Roberto Allende Urrutia	Hipódromo Chile	1500 meters	3yo f	Dirt	August
Clásico Libertador Bernardo O'Higgins Riquelme	Hipódromo Chile	2000 meters	3yo+	Dirt	August
Clásico Valparaiso Sporting (Handicap Libre)	Valparaiso Sporting Club	1900 meters	3yo+	Dirt	August
Clásico Preparación - Luis Cousiño S.	Club Hípico de Santiago	2000 meters	3yo	Turf	September
Clásico Lisímaco Jaraquemada	Club Hípico de Santiago	2000 meters	3yo f	Turf	September
Clásico Velocidad	Club Hípico de Santiago	1000 meters	3yo+	Turf	October
Clásico Primavera - Hernán Braun P y Carolina Budge de B.	Club Hípico de Santiago	2000 meters	3yo+	Turf	October
Paddock Stakes	Club Hípico de Santiago	1800 meters	3yo	Turf	October
Clásico General José M.Carrera Verdugo	Hipódromo Chile	1800 meters	3yo+	Dirt	November
La Copa	Club Hípico de Santiago	2400 meters	3yo+	Turf	December
Clásico Alfredo L.S. Jackson	Valparaiso Sporting Club	1900 meters	3yo	Turf	December
Clásico Selección de Velocistas	Hipódromo Chile	1000 meters	3yo+	Dirt	December

=== Listed ===
Race name	Racecourse	Distance	Conditions	Track	Month
Copa El Mercurio (Handicap Libre)	Valparaiso Sporting Club	1600 meters	3yo+	Turf	January
Clásico Hugo P. Bourchier	Valparaiso Sporting Club	1600 meters	3yo c	Turf	February
Clásico Julio Prado Amor	Hipódromo Chile	2000 meters	3yo+	Dirt	February
Clásico Sociedad Hípica Luis Cousiño	Hipódromo Chile	1400 meters	3yo+ f	Dirt	February
Gran Handicap de Chile	Hipódromo Chile	1600 meters	3yo+	Dirt	March
Clásico Fuerza Aérea de Chile	Hipódromo Chile	1500 meters	3yo+	Dirt	March
Clásico Coronel Santiago Bueras	Hipódromo Chile	1600 meters	3yo+ f	Dirt	March
Clásico Haras de Chile	Club Hípico de Santiago	2000 meters	3yo+	Turf	March
Clásico Carabineros de Chile	Hipódromo Chile	1500 meters	3yo+	Dirt	April
Clásico Geoffrey Bushell W.	Club Hípico de Santiago	1600 meters	3yo+ f	Turf	April
Clásico Alberto Vial Letelier	Hipódromo Chile	1400 meters	2yo f	Dirt	April
Clásico Raúl Spoerer Carmona y Raúl Spoerer Urrutia	Hipódromo Chile	1400 meters	2yo c	Dirt	April
Clásico Armada de Chile	Hipódromo Chile	1800 meters	3yo+ f	Dirt	May
Clásico Carlos Cousiño G.	Club Hípico de Santiago	1200 meters	2yo c	Turf	June
Clásico Luis Subercaseaux E.	Club Hípico de Santiago	1200 meters	2yo f	Turf	June
Clásico Ismael Tocornal	Club Hípico de Santiago	1600 meters	3yo+	Turf	June
Clásico Luis Aldunate Carrera	Club Hípico de Santiago	2000 meters	3yo+	Turf	June
Clásico Carlos Bello Silva	Hipódromo Chile	1600 meters	3yo+	Dirt	July
Clásico Francisco Astaburuaga Ariztia	Hipódromo Chile	1600 meters	3yo	Dirt	August
Clásico Ejercito de Chile	Hipódromo Chile	2000 meters	3yo+	Dirt	September
Clásico Ilustre Municipalidad de Santiago	Club Hípico de Santiago	1700 meters	3yo+	Turf	September
Clásico Luis Larraín Prieto	Club Hípico de Santiago	1300 meters	3yo c	Turf	September
Clásico Luis Dávila Larrain	Club Hípico de Santiago	1300 meters	3yo f	Turf	September
Clásico Carreras del '20	Club Hípico de Santiago	2000 meters	3yo+	Turf	September
Clásico Gustavo Rivera B.	Valparaiso Sporting Club	1500 meters	3yo	Dirt	September
Clásico Luis Vera Calderón y Luis Vera Giannini	Hipódromo Chile	1800 meters	3yo c	Dirt	October
Clásico Constancio Sílva Mandiola	Hipódromo Chile	1500 meters	3yo+ f	Dirt	October
Clásico Asociacion de Propietarios Fina Sangre de Carrera A.G. V Region	Valparaiso Sporting Club	1600 meters	3yo	Turf	November
Clásico Guillermo Del Pedregal Herrera	Hipódromo Chile	2000 meters	3yo	Dirt	November
Clásico Victor Raby y Carlos Raby	Valparaiso Sporting Club	1500 meters	3yo f	Turf	November
Clásico Jorge Baraona Puelma	Club Hípico de Santiago	1700 meters	3yo f	Turf	November
Clásico Ignacio Urrutia de la Sotta	Club Hípico de Santiago	1700 meters	3yo c	Turf	December

== Peru ==
All Peruvian races listed are run at Hipódromo de Monterrico.

=== Group One ===
Race name	Distance	Conditions	Track	Month
Gran Premio Jockey Club del Perú	2400 meters	3yo+	Dirt	June
Gran Premio Pamplona	2000 meters	3yo+ f	Turf	June
Gran Premio Polla de Potrancas	1600 meters	3yo f	Dirt	September
Derby Nacional	2400 meters	3yo	Dirt	November
Gran Premio Nacional “Augusto B. Leguía”	2400 meters	3yo	Turf	December

=== Group Two ===
Race name	Distance	Conditions	Track	Month
Gran Premio Ciudad De Lima	2000 meters	3yo+	Turf	January
Gran Premio Enrique Meiggs	2000 meters	3yo+	Dirt	February
Gran Premio Alfredo Benavides y Alfredo Diez Canseco	2000 meters	3yo+	Dirt	February
La Copa	2200 meters	3yo+	Dirt	April
Gran Premio O.S.A.F.	1600 meters	3yo+	Dirt	June
Gran Premio Independencia	2400 meters	3yo+	Dirt	July
Gran Premio Polla de Potrillos – Roberto Alvarez Calderón Rey	1600 meters	3yo c	Dirt	September
Gran Premio Enrique Ayulo Pardo	2000 meters	3yo f	Dirt	October
Gran Premio Ricardo Ortíz de Zevallos	2000 meters	3yo c	Dirt	October
Gran Premio Almirante Miguel Grau Seminario	2000 meters	3yo+	Turf	October
Gran Premio Hipódromo de Monterrico	2200 meters	3yo+	Dirt	October
Gran Premio Presidente de la República	2400 meters	3yo+	Turf	November
Gran Premio Postin	2400 meters	3yo	Turf	November

=== Group Three ===
Race name	Distance	Conditions	Track	Month
Gran Premio Velocidad	1000 meters	3yo+	Dirt	February
Gran Premio Baldomero Aspíllaga	2000 meters	3yo+	Turf	March
Gran Premio Felipe Pardo y Barreda	2000 meters	3yo+ f	Dirt	March
Gran Premio Miguel A. Checa Eguiguren	1900 meters	3yo+	Turf	May
Gran Premio República Argentina	2000 meters	3yo+ f	Turf	May
Gran Premio América	1000 meters	3yo+	Dirt	June
Gran Premio Pedro García Miró	1800 meters	3yo+	Turf	June
Gran Premio Santorín - Augusto Maggiolo Cavenecia	2800 meters	3yo+	Turf	August
Gran Premio Comercio	2300	3yo+	Dirt	August
Gran Premio Miguel Fort Magot	1800 meters	3yo f	Turf	September
Gran Premio Claudio Fernandez Concha	1800 meters	3yo c	Turf	September
Gran Premio Asociación Propietarios de Caballos de Carrera Perú	2000 meters	3yo+	Dirt	September
Gran Premio Juan Magot Rosselló	1600 meters	3yo+	Dirt	September
Gran Premio Oscar Berckemeyer Pazos	2000 meters	3yo f	Turf	September
Gran Premio Gustavo Prado Heudebert	2000 meters	3yo c	Turf	October
Gran Premio César A. del Río Suito	2000 meters	3yo+ f	Dirt	November
Gran Premio Mariano Ignacio Prado	2000 meters	3yo+	Dirt	November
Gran Premio José Rodríguez Razzeto	1700 meters	3yo+	Dirt	December

=== Listed ===
Race name	Distance	Conditions	Track	Month
Gran Premio Perinox	1600 meters	3yo+	Dirt	January
Gran Premio Frau Astrid	1200 meters	3yo+ f	Turf	January
Gran Premio Galeno	1600 meters	3yo+	Dirt	March
Gran Premio Gustavo Luna Vértiz	1000 meters	3yo+ f	Dirt	March
Gran Premio Aniversario Fundación del Jockey Club del Perú	2000 meters	3yo+	Dirt	March
Gran Premio Enrique D. Barreda y Ricardo Barreda Laos	1200 meters	2yo f	Dirt	March
Gran Premio Carlos II Watson y Eduardo F.G. Watson	1200 meters	2yo c	Dirt	March
Gran Premio Ernesto Ayulo Pardo	2000 meters	3yo+ f	Turf	April
Gran Premio Reina Isabel II	1600 meters	3yo+ f	Dirt	April
Gran Premio Arrabal	1300 meters	3yo+	Dirt	April
Gran Premio Roberto Alvarez Calderón Granados	1300 meters	2yo f	Dirt	April
Gran Premio Mario Manzur Chamy	1300 meters	2yo c	Dirt	April
Gran Premio Augusto Mostajo Barrera	1400 meters	2yo f	Dirt	May
Gran Premio Luis Olaechea Du Bois	1400 meters	2yo c	Dirt	May
Gran Premio Greek Prince	1000 meters	3yo+	Dirt	May
Gran Premio Coronel Alfonso Ugarte	1600 meters	3yo+	Dirt	June
Gran Premio Coronel Francisco Bolognesi	1800 meters	3yo+	Turf	June
Gran Premio Estados Unidos de Norteamérica	2000 meters	3yo+ f	Dirt	July
Gran Premio Hipódromo de Santa Beatriz	1600 meters	3yo f	Dirt	July
Gran Premio Hipódromo de San Felipe	1600 meters	3yo c	Dirt	July
Gran Premio Enrique Martinelli Tizón	1400 meters	3yo+	Dirt	October
Gran Premio Mari July	1900 meters	3yo+ f	Turf	November
Gran Premio Batalla de Tarapacá	1800 meters	3yo+	Turf	November
Gran Premio Batalla de Ayacucho	2000 meters	3yo+ f	Turf	December
Gran Premio Laredo	2400 meters	3yo+	Turf	December

== Uruguay ==
All Uruguayan races listed are run at Hipódromo Nacional de Maroñas, except for the listed race Gran Premio Batalla de las Piedras, run at Hipódromo Las Piedras.

=== Group One ===
Race name	Distance	Conditions	Track	Month
Gran Premio José Pedro Ramírez	2400 meters	3yo+	Dirt	January
Gran Premio Ciudad de Montevideo	2000 meters	3yo+ f	Dirt	January

=== Group Two ===
Race name	Distance	Conditions	Track	Month
Gran Premio General Artigas	2400 meters	3yo+	Dirt	March
Gran Premio Criterium (potrancas)	1400 meters	2yo f	Dirt	June
Gran Premio Estímulo	2000 meters	3yo+ f	Dirt	December
Gran Premio Comparación	2400 meters	3yo+	Dirt	December

=== Group Three ===
Race name	Distance	Conditions	Track	Month
Gran Premio José Serrato	1200 meters	3yo+ f	Turf	January
Gran Premio Manuel Quintela	2100 meters	3yo+	Turf	February
Gran Premio Los Haras	2000 meters	3yo+ f	Dirt	February
Gran Premio Juana Mautone de Cousiño	1000 meters	3yo+ f	Dirt	February
Gran Premio Ministerio de Economía Finanzas - DGC	2100 meters	3yo+ f	Turf	March
Gran Premio Diana	1600 meters	3yo+ f	Dirt	March
Gran Premio Gran Bretaña	1400 meters	3yo+ f	Dirt	April
Gran Premio Benito Villanueva	1600 meters	3yo+	Dirt	April
Gran Premio Rufino T. Domínguez	1200 meters	3yo+ f	Tuf	June
Gran Premio Asociación Uruguaya de Propietarios de S. P. C.	1600 meters	3yo+	Dirt	June
Gran Premio Agraciada	1800 meters	3yo+ f	Dirt	July
Gran Premio Producción Nacional	1500 meters	3yo f	Dirt	July
Gran Premio Ensayo	1500 meters	3yo c	Dirt	July
Gran Premio Asamblea de la Florida	2200 meters	3yo+	Turf	July
Gran Premio Fomento	2100 meters	3yo+ f	Turf	August
Gran Premio Brasil	1400 meters	3yo+ f	Turf	September
Gran Premio Uruguay	1600 meters	3yo+ f	Turf	October

=== Listed ===
Race name	Distance	Conditions	Track	Month
Gran Premio Maroñas	1000 meters	3yo+	Dirt	January
Gran Premio Pedro Piñeyrúa	1600 meters	3yo+	Dirt	January
Gran Premio Perú	1100 meters	3yo+	Dirt	February
Gran Premio Guillermo Young	1600 meters	3yo+	Turf	March
Gran Premio Otoño	1600 meters	3yo+	Dirt	March
Gran Premio José Shaw	1000 meters	3yo+ f	Dirt	March
Gran Premio Municipal	2400 meters	3yo+	Dirt	April
Gran Premio José Martinelli Gómez	1200 meters	3yo+	Turf	April
Gran Premio Treinta y Tres Orientales	1300 meters	2yo f	Turf	April
Gran Premio Lavalleja	1300 meters	2yo c	Turf	April
Gran Premio Milton Diaz Mainero	1400 meters	3yo+ f	Turf	May
Gran Premio Antonio, Antonio J. y Cyro Mattos	1400 meters	3yo+ f	Dirt	May
Gran Premio Batalla de Las Piedras	2000 meters	3yo+	Dirt	May
Gran Premio Asociación de Criadores de S. P. C.	1600 meters	3yo+ f	Dirt	June
Gran Premio Criterium (potrillos)	1400 meters	2yo c	Dirt	June
Gran Premio Reapertura Hipódromo Nacional de Maroñas*	1000 meters	3yo+	Dirt	June
Gran Premio Presidente de la República	2400 meters	3yo+	Dirt	July
Gran Premio Asociación de Criadores de S. P. C.*	1200 meters	3yo+ f	Dirt	July
Gran Premio Francisco Etcheverry Vidal	1200 meters	3yo+	Turf	July
Gran Premio Eduardo Vargas y Eduardo V. Garmendia	1600 meters	3yo+ f	Dirt	July
Gran Premio Zelmar Michelini	1500 meters	3yo+	Dirt	July
Gran Premio Romántico	1100 meters	3yo+	Dirt	August
Gran Premio Francisco y Aureliano Rodríguez Larreta	1600 meters	3yo+	Turf	August
Gran Premio Las Piedras	2000 meters	3yo+	Dirt	September
Gran Premio Polla de Potrancas	1600 meters	3yo f	Dirt	September
Gran Premio Polla de Potrillos	1600 meters	3yo c	Dirt	September
Gran Premio Sarandí	1800 meters	3yo f	Dirt	September
Gran Premio Criadores Nacionales	1800 meters	3yo c	Dirt	September
Gran Premio Suprema Corte de Justicia	1500 meters	3yo+ f	Dirt	September
Gran Premio Alfredo de Castro Pérez	1600 meters	3yo+	Dirt	September
Gran Premio Selección (Oaks)	2000 meters	3yo f	Dirt	October
Gran Premio de Honor	2400 meters	3yo+	Turf	October
Gran Premio Jockey Club	2000 meters	3yo	Dirt	October
Gran Premio Plinio Oribe y Andrés Oribe Deus	1000 meters	3yo+ f	Dirt	October
Gran Premio Carlos Reyles	2300 meters	3yo	Turf	October
Gran Premio Chile	1200 meters	3yo+	Turf	October
Gran Premio Carlos Pellegrini	2400 meters	3yo+	Turf	November
Gran Premio Asamblea General Legislativa	1500 meters	3yo f	Dirt	November
Gran Premio Argentina	1500 meters	3yo c	Dirt	November
Gran Premio Andrés F. Ylla y J. Folle Larreta	1000 meters	3yo+ f	Dirt	November
Gran Premio Nacional (Derby)	2500 meters	3yo	Dirt	November
Gran Premio Bizancio y Sloop	1600 meters	3yo+	Dirt	December
Gran Premio Francia	1000 meters	3yo+	Dirt	December

== Mexico ==
All Mexican races listed are run at Hipódromo de las Américas on dirt. These races are not black type.

Race name	Local group status	Distance	Conditions	Month
Clásico de la Bandera	G3	7 furlongs	3yo+	April
Clásico Alabastro	G3	7.5 furlongs	3yo+	May
Gran Premio Nacional	G2	8 furlongs	3yo c Mexican-bred	June
Hándicap Gay Dalton	G2	8 furlongs	3yo+	June
Clásico Rubí	G2	7.5 furlongs	3yo f Mexican-bred	June
Clásico Tonalá	G3	7.5 furlongs	3yo+ f	June
Stakes Jockey Club Mexicano	G1	8.5 furlongs	3yo c	July
Clásico Esmeralda	G1	8 furlongs	3yo f	July
Hándicap Presidencial	G1	8.5 furlongs	3yo+	July
Derby Mexicano	G1	9 furlongs	3yo c	July
Clásico Diamante	G1	8.5 furlongs	3yo f	July
Hándicap Monarca	G1	8.5 furlongs	3yo+ f	August
Hándicap Loma de Sotelo	G1	9 furlongs	3yo+	August
Clásico Carlos Gómez	G3	6.5 furlongs	2yo c Mexican-bred	September
Clásico Casty	G3	6.5 furlongs	2yo f Mexican-bred	September
Clásico Ciudad de México	G3	6.5 furlongs	3yo c	September
Clásico Debutantes	G3	6.5 furlongs	2yo f	September
Hándicap de las Estrellas	G1	8.5 furlongs	3yo+ f	September
Clásico Gran Zar	G1	6 furlongs	3yo+	September
Hándicap de las Américas	G1	9.5 furlongs	3yo+	September
Clásico Dominicano	G2	7.5 furlongs	2yo c Mexican-bred	October
Clásico Vivian Record	G2	7.5 furlongs	2yo f Mexican-bred	October
Clásico Anáhuac	G2	7.5 furlongs	3yo c	October
Clásico Gran Promesa	G2	7.5 furlongs	2yo f	October
Clásico Criadores Mexicanos (Colts)	G1	9 furlongs	3yo c Mexican-bred	October
Clásico Criadores Mexicanos (Fillies)	G1	8.5 furlongs	3yo f Mexican-bred	October
Clásico Roberto A. Ruiz	G1	8 furlongs	2yo c Mexican-bred	November
Clásico Gaspar Rivera Torres	G1	8 furlongs	2yo f Mexican-bred	November
Clásico Subasta	G2	7 furlongs	2yo c Mexican-bred	November
Clásico Subasta (Fillies)	G2	7 furlongs	2yo f Mexican-bred	November
Clásico Lea-B Fasig Tipton	G1	8 furlongs	2yo f	November
Clásico Dilic Fasig Tipton	G1	8 furlongs	2yo	November
Clásico Revolución	G2	8.5 furlongs	3yo+ f	November
Futurity Mexicano (Colts)	G1	8.5 furlongs	2yo c Mexican-bred	December
Futurity Mexicano (Fillies)	G1	8.5 furlongs	2yo f Mexican-bred	December
Hándicap Copa de Oro	G1	9.5 furlongs	3yo+	December
Campeonato Juvenil	G1	8.5 furlongs	2yo c	December
Campeonato Juvenil (Fillies)	G1	8.5 furlongs	2yo f	December

== Panama ==
All Panamanian races listed are run at Hipódromo Presidente Remón on dirt. These races are considered black type, but the given groups are not internationally recognized.

Race name	Local group status	Distance	Conditions	Month
Clásico Año Nuevo	G1	1800 meters	3yo+	January
Clásico Ernesto Navarro Diaz, Ernesto y Ramón Navarro Diez y Eric Navarro C.	G2	1400 meters	3yo f	January
Clásico Jorge Lao Cruz		1200 meters	4yo+	March
Clásico Angel Caballero		1700 meters	3yo	March
Clásico Heraclio Barletta Bustamante	G2	1200 meters	3yo+ Panamanian-bred	April
Clásico R.P.C. Televisión		1200 meters	4yo+f	April
Premio Policia Nacional		1400 meters	4yo+ f Panamanian-bred	April
Clásico Franciso Arias Paredes y Alberto Arias	G1	1200 meters	3yo+	April
Clásico Dia Internacional del Trabajador	G1	1800 meters	3yo	April
Clásico Alberto (pitin) de Obarrio y Archibald de Obarrio	G3	1800 meters	3yo+	May
Clásico Temístocles Diaz Q.	G2	1700 meters	3yo f Panamanian-bred	May
Clásico Aproturf	G3	1400 meters	3yo+ f	May
Premio Juan Fco. Arias Velásquez y Juan Fco. Arias Díaz		1200 meters	4yo+ Panamanian-bred	May
Clásico Presidente de la República	G1	2100 meters	3yo+	June
Clásico Tomás Gabriel Duque y Tomás Gabriel Altamirano Duque	G2	1700 meters	3yo Panamanian-bred	June
Clásico Felipe Motta	G3	1700 meters	3yo+ f Panamanian-bred	June
Clasico Marcos Justines Fernandez	G2	1400 meters	3yo+ Panamanian-bred	June
Clásico Familia Carrillo		1400 meters	3yo Panamanian-bred	July
Clásico Oscar Grimaldo Valdez, Oscar y Manual Grimaldo		1400 meters	3yo+ f	July
Premio Servicio de Protección		1400 meters	4yo+ f Panamanian-bred	July
Clásico Raul (Lul) Arango, Raúl (Baby) Arango y Roberto (Bob) Arango	G2	1700 meters	3yo Panamanian-bred	July
Premio Mozo De Corrales		1300 meters	4yo+	June
Clásico Victor Hung		1800 meters	3yo+ f Panamanian-bred	July
Clásico Arturo, Eric, Max, Eric Arturo, Eric Antonio. Delvalle	G2	1800 meters	3yo Panamanian-bred	August
Clásico Isaac (Sam) y Samuel Jimenez	G2	1700 meters	3yo+ f	August
Clasico Asociacion de Pura Sangre De Carreras de Panama (APPUCAPA)	G2	1200 meters	3yo	August
Clásico Laffit Pincay	G2	1200 meters	3yo+	August
Clásico Unión De Preparadores	G3	1400 meters	3yo Panamanian-bred	September
Clásico Arquimedes, Fat Fernández, Ibero y Rafael Fernández		1100 meters	2yo c	September
Clásico Augusto Samuel Boyd Paredes y Daniela Boys	G2	1800 meters	3yo Panamanian-bred	September
Clásico Raúl Espinosa (Copa de Oro)	G2	2000 meters	3yo+ Panamanian-bred	September
Clásico Junta de Control de Juegos	G1	1800 meters	3yo+	September
Clásico Sociedad de Dueños		1700 meters	3yo+ f Panamanian-bred	September
Clásico José A. Remón Cantera	G2	1100 meters	2yo f	October
Clásico Luis H. (Mago), Andrés y Marcos Farrugia	G3	1100 meters	2yo Panamanian-bred	October
Clásico Carlos y Fernando Eleta	G2	1800 meters	3yo Panamanian-bred	October
Clásico Ricardo Lau Yunsan		1700 meters	3yo	October
Clásico Rubén Orillac Alfaro	G2	1200 meters	3yo Panamanian-bred	October
Clásico José A Pérez	G3	1100 meters	2yo f Panamanian-bred	October
Clásico Independencia	G1	2000 meters	3yo+	November
Clásico Ernesto Navarro, Diaz Ernesto y Ramon y Eric Navarro	G2	1200 meters	2yo c	November
Premio Dia del Periodista		1400 meters	4yo+ Panamanian-bred	November
Clásico Bartolomé Mafla Herrera	G3	1200 meters	2yo f Panamanian-bred	November
Clásico Aprendices y Profesionles		1400 meters	3yo+ f	November
Clásico Bomberos de Panamá	G2	1200 meters	2yo f	November
Clásico Posse	G3	1200 meters	2yo c Panamanian-bred	December
Clásico Dia de la Madre	G1	1800 meters	3yo+ f	December
Clásico Germán Ruiz Barranco y Germán Ruiz Sanchez	G2	1400 meters	2yo c	December
Clásico Jorge I. Ameglio	G3	1400 meters	2yo f	December
Clásico Navidad	G3	1400 meters	2yo c Panamanian-bred	December
Clásico Sociedad de Criadores de Caballos (SOCRICA)	G2	1400 meters	2yo f Panamanian-bred	December
