= Wow Cat =

Chilean Thoroughbred racehorse

- Sire: Lookin At Lucky
- Grandsire: Smart Strike
- Dam: Winter Cat
- Damsire: Cat Thief
- Sex: Mare
- Foaled: September 15, 2014
- Country: Chile
- Colour: Dark Bay or Brown
- Breeder: Haras Paso Nevado
- Owner: Stud Vendaval and Peter M. Brant
- Record: 16: 9-4-1
- Earnings: $1,202,977

Major wins
- Clásico José Saavedra Baeza (2017) Clásico Tanteo de Potrancas (2017); Clásico Juan Uzurrunzaga Nieto (2017); Clásico Mil Guineas María Luisa Solari Falabella (2017); Gran Criterium Mauricio Serrano P. (2017); Clásico Alberto Solari Magansco (2017); Clásico St. Leger (2017) Beldame Stakes (2018)

Awards
- Chilean Champion Two-Year-Old Filly (2017) Chilean Champion Three-Year-Old Filly (2017) Chilean Horse of the Year (2017)

Wow Cat (15 September 2014–) is a Chilean-bred Thoroughbred racehorse who won the Triple Crown and Fillies' Triple Crown at Hipódromo Chile.

== Background ==
Wow Cat was bred by Haras Paso Nevado, owned by Carlos Urbina Hernández, who also trained her in Chile.

== Racing career ==
=== Chilean campaign (2017) ===
Wow Cat was undefeated in Chile, winning all 8 of her starts, all at Hipódromo Chile. Among her wins were the Group One Tanteo de Potrancas, Mil Guineas María Luisa Solari Falabella, Gran Criterium Mauricio Serrano P., Clásico Alberto Solari Magnasco, and Clásico St. Leger, a combination of races that earned her titles as winner of the Triple Crown and Fillies' Triple Crown of Hipódromo Chile.

Following her Chilean campaign, the plan was to run Wow Cat in the 2018 Gran Premio Latinoamericano, but she was instead sent directly to the United States.

=== American campaign (2018−2019) ===
Wow Cat began racing in the United States in mid-2018. She suffered her first defeats finishing second in the Grade 3 Shuvee Stakes and third in the Grade 1 Personal Ensign Stakes before getting a win in the Grade 1 Beldame Stakes. She finished second to Monomoy Girl in the Grade 1 Breeders' Cup Distaff in her last start of the year.

In 2019, Wow Cat again ran second in the Shuvee Stakes before contesting the Personal Ensign Stakes, finishing fourth. She ran in the Beldame Stakes, but finished second, and finished seventh in the Breeders' Cup Distaff.

== Race statistics ==
Date	Age	Distance	Surface	Race	Grade	Track	Odds	Time	Field	Finish	Winning (losing) margin	Jockey	Ref
Apr 1, 2017	2	1300 meters	Dirt	Condicional	MSW	Hipódromo Chile	2.60*	1:18.65	10	1	8 lengths	Oscar Ulloa P.	
Apr 29, 2017	2	1500 meters	Dirt	Clásico José Saavedra Baeza	III	Hipódromo Chile	4.00	1:29.86	11	1	3 1/2 lengths	Jorge A. González M.	
June 17, 2017	2	1500 meters	Dirt	Tanteo de Potrancas	I	Hipódromo Chile	2.00*	1:28.98	11	1	1/2 head	Jorge A. González M.	
Aug 5, 2017	3	1500 meters	Dirt	Clásico Condicional	ClCd	Hipódromo Chile	2.30*	1:28.93	10	1	8 1/4 lengths	Jorge A. González M.	
Sep 2, 2017	3	1600 meters	Dirt	Mil Guineas Maria Luisa Solari Falabella	I	Hipódromo Chile	1.30*	1:36.01	9	1	4 lengths	Jorge A. González M.	
Oct 7, 2017	3	1900 meters	Dirt	Gran Criterium Mauricio Serrano Palma	I	Hipódromo Chile	2.90	1:56.27	13	1	5 3/4 lengths	Jorge A. González M.	
Nov 4, 2017	3	2000 meters	Dirt	Clásico Alberto Solari Magnasco	I	Hipódromo Chile	1.10*	2:06.38	7	1	12 3/4 lengths	Jorge A. González M.	
Dec 9, 2017	3	2200 meters	Dirt	Clásico St. Leger	I	Hipódromo Chile	1.30*	2:19.77	13	1	5 1/2 lengths	Jorge A. González M.	
Jul 29, 2018	4	9 furlongs	Dirt	Shuvee Stakes	III	Saratoga Race Course	0.90*	1:49.35	6	2	(Neck)	John Velazquez	
Aug 25, 2018	4	9 furlongs	Dirt	Personal Ensign Stakes	I	Saratoga Race Course	4.40	1:47.19	6	3	(9 3/4 lengths)	John Velazquez	
Oct 6, 2018	4	9 furlongs	Dirt	Beldame Stakes	I	Belmont Park	1.30*	1:47.75	8	1	3 1/4 lengths	José Ortiz	
Nov 3, 2018	4	9 furlongs	Dirt	Breeders' Cup Distaff	I	Churchill Downs	6.50	1:49.79	11	2	(1 length)	José Ortiz	
Jul 21, 2019	5	9 furlongs	Dirt	Shuvee Stakes	III	Saratoga Race Course	1.15*	1:49.64	5	2	(2 1/4 lengths)	José Ortiz	
Aug 24, 2019	5	9 furlongs	Dirt	Personal Ensign Stakes	I	Saratoga Race Course	6.00	1:47.92	6	4	(12 3/4 lengths)	John Velazquez	
Sep 28, 2019	5	9 furlongs	Dirt	Beldame Stakes	II	Belmont Park	2.95	1:48.86	5	2	(3 1/4 lengths)	José Ortiz	
Nov 2, 2019	5	9 furlongs	Dirt	Breeders' Cup Distaff	I	Santa Anita Park	21.50	1:50.50	11	7	(14 lengths)	Irad Ortiz Jr.	

An asterisk after the odds means Wow Cat was the post time favorite.

== Breeding career ==
After the Breeders' Cup, Wow Cat was sold at the Keeneland breeding stock sale. Peter Brant's White Birch Farm bought her for $1.7 million, buying out Stud Vandaval.

Wow Cat was kept at Lane's End Farm. In 2020, she was bred to Quality Road, producing a colt in 2021. She was bred to Into Mischief in 2021 and 2022, producing a filly in 2022. She was bred to Gun Runner in 2023, producing a filly. Her 2022 Into Mischief filly, Lost Horizon, finished third in the listed Top Flight Stakes in 2026.

== Pedigree ==
Pedigree of Wow Cat (CHI), dark bay or brown mare, foaled September 15, 2014
Sire Lookin At Lucky (USA) 2007	Smart Strike (USA); 1992	Mr. Prospector (USA)	Raise a Native (USA)
Sire Lookin At Lucky (USA) 2007	Smart Strike (USA); 1992	Mr. Prospector (USA)	Gold Digger (USA)
Sire Lookin At Lucky (USA) 2007	Smart Strike (USA); 1992	Classy 'n Smart (USA)	Smarten (USA)
Sire Lookin At Lucky (USA) 2007	Smart Strike (USA); 1992	Classy 'n Smart (USA)	No Class (USA)
Sire Lookin At Lucky (USA) 2007	Private Feeling (USA); 1999	Belong To Me (USA)	Danzig (USA)
Sire Lookin At Lucky (USA) 2007	Private Feeling (USA); 1999	Belong To Me (USA)	Belonging (USA)
Sire Lookin At Lucky (USA) 2007	Private Feeling (USA); 1999	Regal Feeling (USA)	Clever Trick (USA)
Sire Lookin At Lucky (USA) 2007	Private Feeling (USA); 1999	Regal Feeling (USA)	Sharp Belle (USA)
Dam Winter Cat (CHI) 2005	Cat Thief (USA); 1996	Storm Cat (USA)	Storm Bird (CAN)
Dam Winter Cat (CHI) 2005	Cat Thief (USA); 1996	Storm Cat (USA)	Terlingua (USA)
Dam Winter Cat (CHI) 2005	Cat Thief (USA); 1996	Train Robbery (USA)	Alydar (USA)
Dam Winter Cat (CHI) 2005	Cat Thief (USA); 1996	Train Robbery (USA)	Track Robbery (USA)
Dam Winter Cat (CHI) 2005	Winter Harbor (USA); 2000	Boston Harbor (USA)	Capote (USA)
Dam Winter Cat (CHI) 2005	Winter Harbor (USA); 2000	Boston Harbor (USA)	Harbor Springs (USA)
Dam Winter Cat (CHI) 2005	Winter Harbor (USA); 2000	Plateau (USA)	Seeking The Gold (USA)
Dam Winter Cat (CHI) 2005	Winter Harbor (USA); 2000	Plateau (USA)	Storm Star (USA)

== See also ==
- Triple Crown of Thoroughbred Racing
