= Club Hípico de Antofagasta =

Former horse racing venue in Antofagasta, Chile

Coordinates: 23°34′57″S 70°23′14″W

Club Hipico de Antofagasta was a Thoroughbred race track in Antofagasta, Chile. It features a left-handed nine-furlong dirt oval.

The track currently doesn't stage any major races, and its location is extremely remote (the nearest small race track is in Arequipa, Peru, more than 800 km away; the nearest Chilean track is Valparaiso Sporting Club, more than 1.000 km away).
