= Gran Premio Selección de Potrancas =

Group 1 horse race in Argentina

- Class: Group 1
- Location: Hipódromo de La Plata

Race information
- Distance: 2000 meters
- Surface: Dirt
- Qualification: 3-year-old fillies
- Weight: 56 kg
- Purse: $76,108,0000 ARS (2026); 1st: $40,000,000 ARS

The Gran Premio Selección de Potrancas (previously known as the Premio Selección) is a Group 1 thoroughbred horse race in Argentina for three-year-old fillies. The race is run over 2000 metres (1.2 mi) on the dirt at the Hipódromo de La Plata.

== History ==
When the graded stakes system was introduced in Argentina in 1973, the Premio Selección was initially rated a Group 2 race. By 1979, the race had been upgraded to a Group 1 race. The race was downgraded back to Group 2 in 1984, then upgraded again to Group 1 in 1987, a designation it has retained since.

In 1987, the race was renamed to the Gran Premio Selección de Potrancas, having previously been known as the Premio Selección and being distinguished from the Gran Premio Selección run at the Hipódromo Argentino de Palermo by specifying the track.

== Records since 1988 ==
Speed record:

- 2:02.58 – Halo Holiday (2017)

Greatest margin of victory:

- 19 lengths – Ipacarai (1998)

Most wins by a jockey:

- 3 – Mario Luis Leyes (2000, 2012, 2014)
- 3 – Eduardo Ortega Pavón (2015, 2018, 2020)
- 3 – F. Fernandes Gonçalves (2017, 2022, 2024)

Most wins by a trainer:

- 2 – Domingo Elias Pascual (1991, 1992)
- 2 – Horacio José A. Torres (1997, 2007)
- 2 – Juan Carlos Maldotti (1998, 2002)
- 2 – Miguel Ángel Garcia (2005, 2009)
- 2 – Enrique Martín Ferro (2015, 2021)

Most wins by an owner:

- 3 – Haras Firmamento (2005, 2009, 2017)

Most wins by a breeder:

- 5 – Haras Firmamento (2005, 2009, 2015, 2017, 2021)
- 4 – Haras El Paraíso (1998, 2003, 2013, 2023)

== Winners since 1988 ==
| Year | Winner | Jockey | Trainer | Owner | Breeder | Time | Margin | Ref |
|---|---|---|---|---|---|---|---|---|
| 2026 | Personal Filly | William Pereyra | Juan Franco Salidivia | Haras Wilgerbosdrift | Haras Wilgerbosdrift | 2:06.50 | 5 lengths | |
| 2025 | Calida Sonrisa | William Pereyra | Juan Franco Saldivia | Stud El Arabe | Haras Marovi | 2:13.09 | 1 length | |
| 2024 | Gran Mirella | F. Fernandes Gonçalves | Lalinde D. Marsiglia | Stud Tinta Roja | Al Adiyaat Argentina | 2:08.73 | 1/2 length | |
| 2023 | Lagrimas y Sonrisas | Adrián M. Giannetti | Carlos Alberto Cardón | Stud Comalal | Haras El Paraíso | 2:05.25 | 4 lengths | |
| 2022 | Una Arrabalera | F. Fernandes Gonçalves | Claudio Leonor Bellier | Stud Tinta Roja | Haras Renacer | 2:08.24 | 4 lengths | |
| 2021 | Hit Emerit | Juan Carlos Noriega | Enrique Martín Ferro | Stud Isidoro | Haras Firmamento | 2:05.14 | 3/4 length | |
| 2020 | Serenata Huasteca | Eduardo Ortega Pavón | Lucas Francisco Gaitán | Haras Pozo de Luna | Haras Pozo de Luna | 2:06.49 | 8 lengths | |
| 2019 | Sankalpa | Fabricio Raúl Barroso | Juan Manuel Etchechoury | Stud Tres Marias | Oswaldo Antonio Vilez Salas | 2:05.44 | 2 lengths | |
| 2018 | Manuca Rosalina | Eduardo Ortega Pavón | Néstor Fabián Pastor | Stud El Azulgrana | Haras La Pasion | 2:05.61 | 2 1/2 lengths | |
| 2017 | Halo Holiday | F. Fernandes Gonçalves | Juan Carlos Etchechoury | Haras Firmamento | Haras Firmamento | 2:02.58 | 10 lengths | |
| 2016 | Furia Azteca | Juan Cruz Villagra | Pablo Ezequiel Sahagián | Stud Facundito | Haras La Pasion | 2:04.09 | 12 lengths | |
| 2015 | Catch the Cocktail | Eduardo Ortega Pavón | Enrique Martín Ferro | Stud San Isidoro | Haras Firmamento | 2:03.98 | 9 lengths | |
| 2014 | Contessa Linda | Mario Luis Leyes | Viviana B. Acevedo | Stud Eseerreefe | Haras Abolengo | 2:07.90 | 9 lengths | |
| 2013 | Travelwell | Mario E. Fernández | Ángel Alberto Piana | Stud Los San Esteban | Haras El Paraíso | 2:04.42 | 1 1/2 lengths | |
| 2012 | Felicidad is Back | Mario Luis Leyes | Daniel Alberto Bordon | Haras Santa Maria de Araras | Haras Santa Maria de Araras | 2:06.06 | 4 lengths | |
| 2011 | Life For Sale | Jorge Antonio Ricardo | Juan Javier Etchechoury | Stud Rubio B. | Peixoto de Castro Palhares, Paulo C | 2:04.91 | 7 lengths | |
| 2010 | Maldivas | Gonzalo Hahn | Raúl Alberto Ramallo | Stud Los Retoños | Haras Carampangue | 2:06.08 | 5 lengths | |
| 2009 | Kalath Wells | Cardenas E. Talaverano | Miguel Ángel García | Haras Firmamento | Haras Firmamento | 2:03.48 | 5 lengths | |
| 2008 | Rica Roy | Jesus Alberto Medina | Roberto M. Bullrich | Stud Carampangue | Bullines S.A. | 2:05.66 | 1/2 length | |
| 2007 | Magic Sale | Juan Horacio Doello | Horacio José A. Torres | Haras Arroyo de Luna | Haras Arroyo de Luna | 2:04.64 | 2 lengths | |
| 2006 | Gualeta | Gonzalo Hahn | Urbano M. Pimentel | Stud La Bienvenida | Ricardo David Rabotnicoff | 2:04.46 | 4 lengths | |
| 2005 | Smart Wells | Cardenas E. Talaverano | Miguel Ángel García | Haras Firmamento | Haras Firmamento | 2:05.22 | 1 length | |
| 2004 | Santa Candida | Julio César Méndez | Roberto Pellegatta | Stud Viejobueno | Haras Vadarkblar | 2:06.33 | 3 lengths | |
| 2003 | Incaparai | Pedro Roberto Robles | Carlos D. Etchechoury | Stud Los Patrios | Haras El Paraíso | 2:08.32 | 1/2 neck | |
| 2002 | Luna Local | Pablo Gustavo Falero | Juan Carlos Maldotti | Stud Ansiedad | Haras Las Dos Manos | 2:07.32 | 2 lengths | |
| 2001 | Nova Era | Lucrecia M. Crabajal | José Luis Palacios | Stud El Matucho | Haras La Quebrada | 2:06.74 | 2 lengths | |
| 2000 | Vitrina Cat | Mario Luis Leyes | Diego Christian Pereyra | Stud Caro Kan | Haras Maria Del Sol | 2:05.69 | 1/2 length | |
| 1999 | Lucida Friul | Alfredo Orlando Olivera | Roberto E. Fondovila | Fondo (LP) Inhabilitada | | 2:11.90 | 1/2 length | |
| 1998 | Ipacarai | Juan Carlos Noriega | Juan Carlos Maldotti | Stud Los Patrios | Haras El Paraíso | 2:10.71 | 19 lengths | |
| 1997 | Now Bordeaux | Fabián Antonio Rivero | Horacio José A. Torres | Haras Dilu | Néstor Emilio Otero | 2:07.96 | 4 lengths | |
| 1996 | Goleada | Francisco Arreguy | Nicolás Adrián Yalet | Stud Las Telas | Haras La Quebrada | 2:04.19 | 3/4 length | |
| 1995 | Sanwat | Mario A. Correa De Melo | Rubén Andrés Torres | Stud La Viña | Haras El Tala | 2:10.10 | 2 1/2 lengths | |
| 1994 | Catch-it | Ricardo R. Ioselli | Martín R. Ferreyra | Stud Un Sueño | Haras Argentino | 2:07.67 | 1 length | |
| 1993 | Bordeaux Mary | Lucas Omar Sosa | José A. Torres | Stud Las 3 Marias | Juan Oscar Sibetti | 2:07.95 | 1 1/2 lengths | |
| 1992 | Sally Girl | Oscar Fabián Conti | Domingo Elias Pascual | Haras Santa Maria de Araras | Haras Santa Maria de Araras | 2:08.37 | 4 lengths | |
| 1991 | Farway Oca | Juan Luis Alvis | Domingo Elias Pascual | Stud Tres Lomas | Haras Ocaragua | 2:08.66 | Neck | |
| 1990 | Vigesima | | Eduardo Oscar Ferro | Haras Abolengo | Haras Abolengo | 2:09.34 | 1 1/2 head | |
| 1989 | Choice Girl | | | Haras La Biznaga | Haras La Biznaga | 2:09.15 | 2 1/2 lengths | |
| 1988 | Nice Bijou | | Antonio Derli Gómez | Stud Happy End | | 2:09.58 | | |

== Earlier Winners (incomplete) ==
- 1945: Michunga
- 1946: Niña Bruja
- 1948: Empeñosa
- 1951: Sandalia
- 1965: Vit Reina
- 1967: Kaiserin
- 1971: Gentezuela
- 1972: Venerable
- 1973: Seatle
- 1974: Ellenore
- 1975: Semifusa
- 1979: Prevista
- 1980: Frau Daruma
- 1981: Taxi Girl II
- 1982: Frau Ninfa
- 1983: Cerbatana
- 1984: Native Kate
- 1985: Stall Cloud
- 1986: Royal Bay
- 1987: Piñuela
