= Valparaiso Sporting Club =

Race track in Viña del Mar, Chile

Coordinates: 33.022482°S 71.539278°W

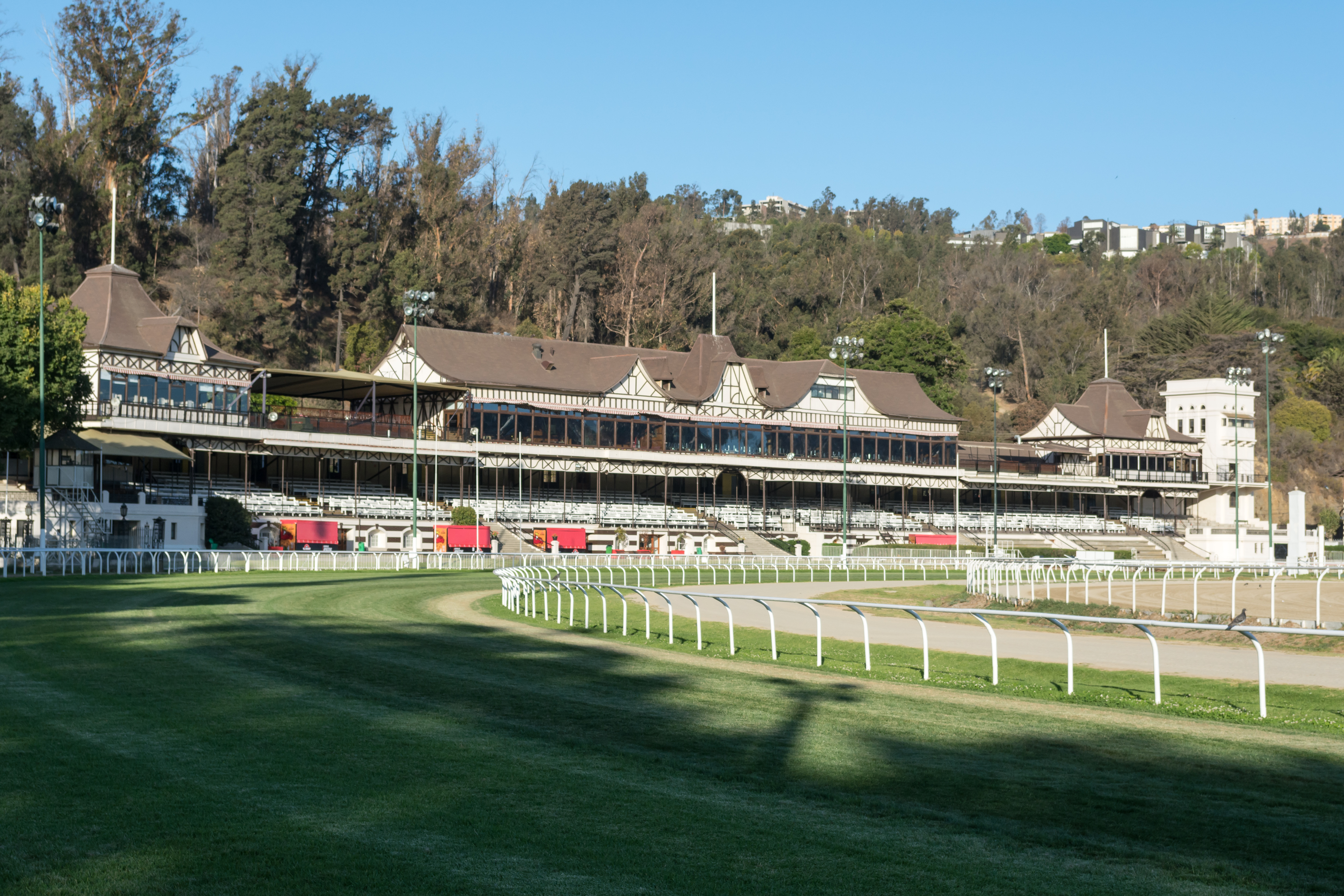
- Location: Viña del Mar, Chile
- Date opened: 1882
- Race type: Thoroughbred

Valparaiso Sporting (formerly known as Valparaiso Sporting Club), commonly known as the Sporting, is a thoroughbred flat horse race track in Viña del Mar, Valparaíso Region, Chile.

== History ==
Valparaiso Sporting Club was founded in 1882 by members of mostly British origin. Since 1885, it has been the site of the Chilean Derby, which continues to draw large crowds on race day..

In 1920, Valparaiso Sporting Club was the site of the 1920 South American Championship in football, the precursor competition to the Copa America.

== Physical attributes ==
Races are conducted on two left-handed courses, one turf (about 2000 meters long) and one dirt (about 1900 meters long).

== Racing ==
Purses at the Sporting are lower than at the two Greater Santiago tracks, Hipodromo Chile and Club Hipico de Santiago, but considerably higher than at the provincial tracks Club Hipico de Concepcion and Club Hipico de Antofagasta. Several prestigious stakes races are run at Valparaiso.

| Preceded by Estadio das Laranjeiras; Rio de Janeiro | South American Championship; Finals Venue; 1920 | Succeeded by Estadio Sportivo Barracas; Buenos Aires |
