= Grande Prêmio Protetora do Turfe =

Grande Premio Protetora do Turfe is a Grade III left-handed flat race for three-year-old horses and up (3yo+) thoroughbreds in Brazil.

Disputed over (actually) 2,200 meters, every September at Hipodromo do Cristal.

It is a traditional horse race in dirt track in Brazil, raced since 1922.

== Race Day ==
September, 7 (Brazilian Independence Day) or close to.

== Results ==
YEAR - WINNER - (SIRE & DAM) - DISTANCE - 2nd PLACE, 3rd PLACE - TIME (in seconds)

Year	Winner	CY	Sire	CY	Dam	CY	Dist	2nd place	3rd place	Time
1922	PRECURSOR	Argentina	SANS ATOUT	Argentina	PICARA	Argentina	2400mt			159s1/5
1923	PERTINAZ	Argentina	INDEX	Argentina	FLORECILLA	Argentina	2100mt	TIFON	-	139s2/5
1924	PLENO	Argentina	CARLOS XII	Argentina	ARTEMIX		2100mt			137s2/5
1925	DINAZARDA	Argentina	BARATIERE	Argentina	DALMACIA	Argentina	2100mt			135s4/5
1926	GOLOSO	Uruguay	GRADELY	United Kingdom	GOLOSINA	Uruguay	2200mt	DECAMPS	-	144s
1927	CHARMER	Uruguay	YAGO	Argentina	CHARMING HOPE		2200mt			146s4/5
1928	EDISON	Uruguay	GRADELY	United Kingdom	RICUSA		2100mt			140s
1929	SCORPIO	Uruguay	PILLO	United Kingdom	SENDA	Argentina	2100mt			139s 3/5
1930	LANDE FLEURIE	France	COLLABORATOR	United Kingdom	LAND LADY	France	2100mt			137s 2/5
1931	LANDE FLEURIE	France	COLLABORATOR	United Kingdom	LAND LADY	France	2100mt			137s 2/5
1932	OMLET	Argentina	POLEMARCH	United Kingdom	FINTA	Argentina	2100mt			136s 2/5
1933	GIN PURO	Argentina	MACON	Argentina	GRAN SENORA	Argentina	2200mt			144s
1934	LOMBARDO	Uruguay	AIR RAID	United Kingdom	ASTER	Uruguay	2200mt			143 2/5
1935	OBOE	Brazil	OLDIMAN	Argentina	NUX VOMICA		2200mt			145s
1936	MADCAP	Argentina	CRAGANOUR	United Kingdom	MERROSE	United Kingdom	2200mt			145s 1/5
1937	OUROEFIO	Argentina	ENLAZADOR	Argentina	LIBREA	Uruguay	2200mt			145s 3/5
1938	MORDISCON	Argentina	LETEO	Argentina	MUCHACHA	Argentina	2200mt			144s 3/5
1939	ABOUKIR	Argentina	ZAMBO	United Kingdom	LADY DIVINE	Argentina	2200mt			144s 2/5
1940	LINDAZO	Argentina	SILURICO	Argentina	LA CASCADA		2200mt			144s 3/5
1941	OUROFINO	Argentina	COCLES	Argentina	VICTORIANA		2200mt			144s 3/5
1942	ARDENT	Argentina	SONGE	France	APACHINETTE	Argentina	2200mt			146s
1943	SEDUCTOR	Argentina	SERIO	Argentina	CANDIDE	Argentina	2200mt			143s 3/5
1944	SECRETO	Argentina	COCLES	Argentina	SEINE	Argentina	2200mt			145s 4/5
1945	TROMPO	Argentina	TABLE GREEN	Argentina	HAUTE COMBE	Argentina	2200mt			145s 1/5
1946	MARIMOA	Argentina	SONGE	France	MIMI	Argentina	2200mt			145s 2/5
1947	OUROGRANFA	Uruguay	RULER	Argentina	SUENO AZUL	Uruguay	2200mt	GRECIANO	MARIMOA	146s 2/5
1948	OUROPOUCO	Uruguay	COCLES	Uruguay	LATITA	Uruguay	2200mt			147s 2/5
1949	ASTUTO	Brazil	GALEON	Uruguay	LA ASTUTA	Uruguay	2200mt			145s
1950	CARCEL	Brazil	NEW YEAR	Argentina	CARY	Argentina	2200mt			145s 3/5
1951	MARECHAL	Brazil	MEULEN	Argentina	LEONISE	Brazil	2200mt			144s 3/5
1952	OLMO	Argentina	LAPACHITO	Argentina	GRECIAN	Argentina	2200mt	CARCEL	ASTRO DE OURO	145s
1953	CARICIA	Argentina	SAINT FILLAN	Argentina	CALLEJERA	Argentina	2200mt			145s 3/5
1954	BUCANERO	Uruguay	BORRON	Uruguay	GALEOTA	Uruguay	2200mt			144s
1955	MAJOR	Brazil	MEULEN	Argentina	BIRDSHOP	Argentina	2200mt			143s 3/5
1956	GUAITIL	Brazil	NEW YEAR	Argentina	TOSCA	Argentina	2200mt			144s 4/5
1957	DALMATA	Uruguay	DAVISTAN	United States	EVER	Uruguay	2200mt			143s
1958	OURODUPLO	Brazil	DARK WARRIOR	United Kingdom	PERFIDIA	France	2200mt	CORDIAL	SALOMÃO(dh)	143s 4/5
1959	ESTENSORO	Brazil	ESTOC	France	PERFIDIA	France	2200mt			141s
1960	LORD CHANEL	Brazil	LORD ANTIBES	France	ALMA DE OURO	Argentina	2200mt			144s
1961	LORD CHANEL	Brazil	LORD ANTIBES	France	ALMA DE OURO	Argentina	2200mt			144s
1962	ESTUPENDA	Brazil	ESTOC	France	OUROCINZA	Argentina	2200mt	LORD CHANEL	OUROPOMBO	140s 2/5
1963	EL TRONIO	Brazil	ELPENOR	France	OREADA	Argentina	2200mt			141s 3/5
1964	OUROPOMBO	Brazil	NOGARO	Brazil	PALOMA	Brazil	2200mt	FILBAS	EL CORSARIO	143s
1965	TAKAKO	Brazil	NASSAU	Brazil	SANTUXA	Brazil	2200mt	ADMIROR	TEM TEMPO	142s 1/5
1966	DESCANSADO	Brazil	SALOMAO	Brazil	EAGLE QUEEN	Brazil	2200mt	SABOT	EL TRONIO	140s4/5
1967	ESTHETA	Brazil	FORT NAPOLEON	France	QUADRILHA	Brazil	2200mt			143s
1968	COREJADA	Brazil	ELPENOR	France	ESTUPENDA	Brazil	2200mt			144s 2/5
1969	KING TWIST	Brazil	TAKT	Germany	FILLE DE TROIE	France	2200mt	MOMASTRE	LAZIO	142s 1/5
1970	LEXICON	Brazil	ULTRA	Brazil	LA DERNIERE	Uruguay	2200mt			141s 2/5
1971	BILLY	Brazil	EMPENHO	Brazil	BLUE EYES	Brazil	2200mt			141s 3/5
1972	LEXICON	Brazil	ULTRA	Brazil	LA DERNIERE	Uruguay	2200mt	TRAGI FARSA	POCONE	140s1/5
1973	TRAGI FARSA	Brazil	EL TRONIO	Brazil	PIASTRA	Brazil	2200mt	OLDAK	-	142s 3/5
1974	OTONAL	Uruguay	GABIN	Argentina	RANCHERITA	Argentina	2200mt	PERGAMINHO	JONICO	140s1/5
1975	PERGAMINHO	Brazil	ALABASTRO	Brazil	OUROARA	Brazil	2200mt	ULEANTO	PARPADEO	140s2/5
1976	EL SUPREMO	Brazil	ELPENOR	France	ESTUPENDA	Brazil	2200mt	FANERANTO	ULEANTO	138s 4/5
1977	BESTER	Brazil	URBELO	Brazil	PRAIANINHA	Brazil	2200mt	PACO RABANNE	CHAMPOLLION	138s2/5
1978	GARVE	Brazil	GARBOSO	Brazil	ARVEJA	Uruguay	2200mt	FARAMON	UNDER	137s 2/5
1979	GARVE	Brazil	GARBOSO	Brazil	ARVEJA	Uruguay	2200mt	ZABRO	EL REBELDE	138s 2/5
1980	GARVE	Brazil	GARBOSO	Brazil	ARVEJA	Uruguay	2200 MT	TRIARCO	FLATIRIS	138s4/5
1981	PASSEUR	Brazil	PASS THE WORD	United States	TAIROA	Brazil	2200mt	SNOW SCOTCH	POLYORIN	145s
1982	ZIRBO	Brazil	EGOISMO	Brazil	LEREIA	Brazil	2200mt	CELTICO	ZIRKEL	142s
1983	ZIRBO	Brazil	EGOISMO	Brazil	LEREIA	Brazil	2200mt	AUNANTE	CELTICO	138s
1984	ZIRKEL	Brazil	ST CHAD	United Kingdom	NUZA	Brazil	2200mt	EDICION	TAPERAO	140s2/5
1985	NANTWO	Brazil	TONNERRE	Brazil	BORDUNETE	Brazil	2200mt	INTERSTAR	HIPER GENIO	141s
1986	EL JACK	Brazil	RIGHT OFF	Argentina	PIPIA	Brazil	2200mt	FAST MORE	KEAGRAVO	143s 4/5
1987	ELDAN	Brazil	ESBIRRO	Uruguay	COLUMPIA	Uruguay	2200mt	HEITOR	BENEDINI	140s
1988	SUPREME GOLD	Brazil	BAR GOLD	Brazil	ANA BALA	Brazil	2200mt	ENDYKID	ARACATU	139ss 2/5
1989	HIPER GENIO	Brazil	VIZIANE	Brazil	SCOTTISH QUEEN	Argentina	2200mt	PELECHO	JENNAGAH	140s4/5
1990	HIPER GENIO	Brazil	VIZIANE	Brazil	SCOTTISH QUEEN	Argentina	2200mt	ANATOLE	LESTEUR	140s2/5
1991	POCKER FACE	Brazil	EFESIVO	Brazil	POLAR CALL	Ireland	2200mt	AIOROSO	BIG BROTHER	140s5/10
1992	CAP ANTIFER	Brazil	KURYAKIN	Argentina	NORTIA	Brazil	2200mt	HARVEST MOON	BESANCON	140s6/10
1993	IPAO	Brazil	COPELAN	United States	BELLA SOLA	Ireland	2200mt	URBAN HERO	ATIMO	139s 6/10
1994	CHECK CONTROL	Brazil	IMPRUDENT LARK	Brazil	DIORAMIM	Brazil	2200mt	RUTILIO	CHARLIE BROWN	139s8/10
1995	LA BRAVA GUARDIA	Brazil	ROBA FINA	Ireland	FLY AND RUN	Brazil	2200mt	CHECK CONTROL	PEGUY	140s 3/10
1996	CALL ME FURY	Brazil	THUNDERING FORCE	United States	IMNISERT	Brazil	2200mt	WULARO ROAD	HUNGRY EMINENCE	137s 7/10
1997	SUPER PURPLE	Brazil	PURPLE MOUNTAIN	United States	MANAMAKI	Brazil	2200mt	TIME SWITCH	BIG KADU	139s 8/10
1998	GRAN RICCI	Argentina	LODE	United States	MISS CLEEF	Argentina	2200mt	GRAN PHINO	HONEY STREET	139s6/10
1999	RECOLLET	Brazil	PLEASANT VARIETY	United States	GENERALITE	Brazil	2200mt	FIGHTING IRISH	SOLAR MONTERREY	137s 8/10
2000	UNDERGROUND FIRE	Argentina	PERFECT PARADE	United States	INQUIETA DARK	Argentina	2200mt	JUSTUS MAGNUS	VEILLE	137s 1/10
2001	ASSAULTING RIDE	Brazil	ROI NORMAND	United States	LADY CHRIS	Brazil	2200mt	HANGARITO	UNDERGROUND FIRE	136s 4/10
2002	MUCHO DINERO	Brazil	SHUDANZ	Canada	JUST THE FIRST	Brazil	2200mt	JUBA DE LEAO	ZECOLMEIA	138s 8/10
2003	TELLUS	Brazil	MINSTREL GLORY	United States	LARRIAGE	Brazil	2200mt	LUCKY LOAD	ZECOLMEIA	138s 2/10
2004	BEST FRIENDS	Brazil	PUNK	Argentina	SUPER CLARA	Brazil	2200mt	TRAY CARNIVAL	MUCHO DINERO	141s 3/10
2005	MYSTIC SUNSET	Brazil	KENETICO	Brazil	SPEAK FIGHTER	Brazil	2200mt	ZAFA	MAHLER	139s
2006	POWER TOPTEN	Brazil	DANCER MAN	Brazil	TOPTOPTOPTEN	United States	2200mt	LENFANT GATE	GARY STEVENS	137s 6/10
2007	REALLY THE FIRST	Brazil	SHUDANZ	Canada	JUST THE FIRST	Brazil	2200mt	BETTER BE GOOD	NORTHERN KING	138s 2/10
2008	JAGUANUM	Brazil	PITU DA GUANABARA	Brazil	DANCEY KATE	Brazil	2200mt	REI JAZZ	BETTER BE GOOD	138s 3/10
2009	MY MAJESTY	Brazil	VETTORI	Ireland	BEAUTIFUL BEE	United States	2200mt	NEW ROYALE	MANE GOL	138s 8/10
2010	SIGA GOLD	Brazil	SIGA BRAVO	Brazil	ROAD GOLD	Brazil	2200mt	SUNDOWN SALLON	P ICK PICK	139s 4/10
2011	ASK ME NOT	Brazil	ARACAI	Brazil	ASSAI BELLA	Brazil	2200mt	CANTATUS	PRINCIPE DOS MARES	138s 7/10
2012	FORCE TO FORCE	Brazil	ARAMBARE	Brazil	ALLEA JACTA EST	Brazil	2200mt	A SK ME NOT	PROVEN RIGHT	138s 7/10
2013	VENDEL	Brazil	KNOW HEIGHTS	Ireland	MADAME DODGE	Brazil	2200mt	FORCE TO FORCE	JOINT CHIEF	138s
2014	BEDUINO DO BRASIL	Brazil	IMPRESSION	Argentina	DELINQUENT BIRD	Brazil	1900mt	SAVE THE TIGER	BEST MAGIC	123s2/10

== Bibliography ==
- History (in Portuguese)
