= Grande Prêmio Paraná =

Horse race

- Class: Group 3
- Location: Hipódromo do Tarumã; Curitiba, Brazil
- Inaugurated: 1942 (84 years ago)
- Race type: Thoroughbred

Race information
- Distance: 2000 meters
- Surface: Dirt
- Track: Left-handed
- Qualification: Three-year-olds and up
- Weight: Assigned

The Grande Prêmio Paraná is a Group 3, left-handed Brazilian flat horse race for three-year-olds and up. It is the principal horse race in the state of Paraná.

The race was not run in 2014 and 2015. Because of this, from 2016 onward it's considered a Group III race.

== History ==
The Grande Prêmio Paraná was first run in 1942 at Hipódromo do Guabirotuba. In 1955, it was moved to the newly constructed Hipódromo do Tarumã.

Over the years, the Grande Prêmio Paraná has been run over a variety of distances:

- 2000 meters: 2010–
- 2400 meters: 1967–2009
- 3000 meters: 1946–1966
- 3100 meters: 1942–1944
- 3200 meters: 1945

== Records ==
Speed record:

- 2000 meters (current distance): 2:01.50 – Obataye (2023)
- 2400 meters: 2:33.7 – Jolly Boy (1999)
- 3000 meters: 3:12.2 – Salomão (1955)
- 3100 meters: 3:29.6 – Con Ochos (1942)
- 3200 meters: 3:37.8 – Barba Azul (1945)

Most wins:

- 2 – Henry Junior (1986, 1987)
- 2 – Soft Gold (1995, 1996)
- 2 – Kopenhagen (2021, 2022)

Most wins by a jockey:

- 3 – A. Domingos (2006, 2011, 2019)
- 3 – H. Fernandes (2012, 2021, 2022)

Most wins by a trainer:

- 5 – M. F. Gusso (1989, 1997, 2000, 2017, 2020)
- 4 – P. Nickel Jr. (1995, 1996, 2002, 2004)
- 3 – E. P. Gusso (1971, 1972, 1973)

Most wins by an owner:

- 3 – Stud Seabra (1953, 1957, 1960)
- 3 – Haras Rio Iguassú (2011, 2016, 2023)

Most wins by a breeder (since 1964):

- 6 – Haras J. B. Barros (1990, 1992, 2002, 2006, 2010, 2011)
- 3 – Haras Jahú e Rio das Pedras (1967, 1969, 1977)

== Winners ==
Year	Winner	Age	Jockey	Trainer	Owner	Breeder	Distance	Time	Group	Ref
2023	Obataye	3	V. Gil	A. Oldoni	Haras Rio Iguassú	Haras Palmerini	2000 meters	2:01.50	3	
2022	Kopenhagen	6	H. Fernandes	A. Menegolo Neto	Haras Springfield	Haras Springfield	2000 meters	2:07.21	3	
2021	Kopenhagen	5	H. Fernandes	A. Menegolo Neto	Haras Springfield	Haras Springfield	2000 meters	2:08.3	3	
2020	Lionel the Best	3	B. Queiroz	M. F. Gusso	Stud My Hero Dad	Haras Palmerini	2000 meters	2:11.7	3	
2019	Ultra Bom	4	A. Domingos	V. Fornasaro	Haras São Marcos Paulista	Haras Calunga	2000 meters	2:08.8	3	
2018	Grand Amiga ƒ	4	I. Santana	D. L. Albres	Haras Cifra	Haras Cifra	2000 meters	2:08.6	3	
2017	No Ar	5	A. Mesquita	M. F. Gusso	Stud Blue Velvet	Coudelaria Baptista	2000 meters	2:09.3	3	
2016	First Amour	4	V. Rocha	A. B. Pereira	Haras Rio Iguassú	Haras Fronteira P.A.P.	2000 meters	2:09.5	3	
2015	Not run									
2014	Not run									
2013	Victory is Ours	4	J. Gulart	A. Oliveira	Stud TNT/Haras Vale Verde		2000 meters	2:06.7	1	
2012	Stockholder	5	H. Fernandes	D. Guignoni	Coudelaria Barcelona	Haras São José da Serra	2000 meters	2:09.7	1	
2011	Jéca	4	A. Domingos	A. B. Pereira	Haras Rio Iguassú	Haras J. B. Barros	2000 meters	2:07.9	1	
2010	Jaburú Vip	3	L. Chimenes	E. Araújo	Stud Malta	Haras J. B. Barros	2000 meters	2:09.0	1	
2009	Mr. Nedawi	5	J. Aparecido	J. G. Costa	Stud Hole in One	Haras Old Friends	2400 meters	2:37.3	1	
2008	Tango Uno	3	W. Blandi	J. Henrique	Haras Tango	Haras Tango	2400 meters	2:36.2	1	
2007	Alucard	5	C. Lavor	L. R. Feltran	Stud Transilvânia	Haras Santarém	2400 meters	2:35.2	1	
2006	Fogonaroupa	3	A. Domingos	L. R. Feltran	José Cid Campelo Jr.	Haras J. B. Barros	2400 meters	2:34.3	1	
2005	Fort Bird	5	J. Ricardo	C. P. Gusso	Haras Moenda de Itatiba	Haras Mignon	2400 meters	2:35.3	1	
2004	Dá-lhe Grison	3	N. Souza	P. Nickel Jr.	Haras Clemente Moletta	Haras Clemente Moletta	2400 meters	2:36.5	1	
2003	Nugget do Faxina	4	M. Pereira	O. M. Nascimento	Haras Faxina	Haras Faxina	2400 meters	2:33.8	1	
2002	Baccarat	3	F. Durso	P. Nickel Jr.	Stud Chesapeake	Haras J. B. Barros	2400 meters	2:36.8	1	
2001	Impardonnable	5	A. Queiroz	A. F. Correia	Stud R.A.A. B.C.	Haras Lorolu	2400 meters	2:35.1	1	
2000	Mr. Pleasentfar	3	J. Ayarza	M. F. Gusso	Haras Garcêz Castellano	Haras Garcêz Castellano	2400 meters	2:39.9	1	
1999	Jolly Boy	4	M. Nunes	M. Signoretti	Haras Faxina	Haras Faxina	2400 meters	2:33.7	1	
1998	Jack Grandi	4	L. Duarte	J. S. Silva	Stud Tevere	Haras Kigrandi	2400 meters	2:35.7	1	
1997	Innamorato	4	J. M. Silva	M. F. Gusso	Rubens Grahi	Haras Garcêz Castellano	2400 meters	2:33.9	1	
1996	Soft Gold	4	M. Fontoura	P. Nickel Jr.	Stud Double M	Haras Zenabre	2400 meters	2:36.6	1	
1995	Soft Gold	3	J. Aparecido	P. Nickel Jr.	Stud Double M	Haras Zenabre	2400 meters	2:36.4	1	
1994	Super Purple	4	S. Generoso	L. C. Santos	Stud F.K.	Haras Rosa do Sul	2400 meters	2:37.5	1	
1993	Nilove	4	A. Vale	A. Alvani	Haras Jatobá	Haras Jatobá	2400 meters	2:37.3	1	
1992	Kanaloa ƒ	5	E. Araújo	F. A. Monteiro	Haras J. B. Barros	Haras J. B. Barros	2400 meters	2:35.9	1	
1991	Danger Horse	7	C. Canuto	S. Lobo	Stud Super Campeão	Haras Mossoró	2400 meters	2:39.2	1	
1990	King of Rivers	3	G. Menezes	F. A. Monteiro	Haras J. B. Barros	Haras J. B. Barros	2400 meters	2:38.8	1	
1989	Golden News	3	A. Cassante	M. F. Gusso	Haras Primavera	Haras Tres Lagos	2400 meters	2:36.5	1	
1988	Gaillardet	6	C. Canuto	M. Gosik	Haras Jatobá	Haras Jatobá	2400 meters	2:40.0	1	
1987	Henry Junior	5	J. M. Amorim	C. Lira	Haras Serrano	Haras Serrano	2400 meters	2:37.2	1	
1986	Henry Junior	4	J. M. Amorim	C. Lira	Haras Serrano	Haras Serrano	2400 meters	2:37.1	1	
1985	Manaus	6	J. Dacosta	R. M. Dacosta	Stud São José dos Bastiões	Oscar Guimarães Machado	2400 meters	2:39.0	1	
1984	Blessed Nest	3	S. Barbosa	A. R. Pelanda	Haras Faixa Branca	Haras Gralha Azul	2400 meters	2:35.5	1	
1983	Kigrandi	4	J. Garcia	D. Garcia	Stud Tevere	Haras Malurica	2400 meters	2:33.9	1	
1982	Zirkel	4	A. Oliveira	A. Garcia	Stud Ponte Nova	Fazenda da Mondesir	2400 meters	2:38.2	1	
1981	Clackson	5	G. Assis	A. S. Ventura	Stud Montecatini	Agro Pastoril Haras São Luiz Ltda.	2400 meters	2:37.8	1	
1980	Reichmark	5	L. Yanes	J. M. Orellana	Stud Jéssica	Haras Albur	2400 meters	2:41.0	1	
1979	Inanias	6	Eli Machado Bueno	J. M. Ferreira	Haras Eduardo Guilherme	Haras Eduardo Guilherme	2400 meters	2:42.0	1	
1978	Riadhis	3	Mauri Santos	L. C. Liz	Claudio Kerber	Haras Preto e Ouro	2400 meters	2:38.4	2	
1977	Zabro	4	Jorge Garcia	L. B. Gonçalves	Haras Jahú	Haras Jahú e Rio das Pedras	2400 meters	2:37.2	2	
1976	Grão de Bico	5	Juvenal Machado da Silva	P. Nickel	Coudelaria FAN	Coudelaria FAN	2400 meters	2:36.0	2	
1975	Arnaldo	4	José Fagundes	F. Sobreiro	Stud Tibagi	Haras Tibagi	2400 meters	2:43.2	2	
1974	Beirão	5	Sidnei Barbosa	L. Santos	Haras Preto e Ouro	Haras Paraná	2400 meters	2:39.0		
1973	Oldak	4	Jorge Terres	E. P. Gusso	Stud Rio dos Poços	Haras São José dos Pinhais	2400 meters	2:44.4		
1972	Ruffus	4	Antônio Bolino	E. P. Gusso	Haras Ipiranga	Haras Ipiranga	2400 meters	2:46.0		
1971	Negroni	6	Antônio Bolino	E. P. Gusso	Haras Ipiranga	Haras Ipiranga	2400 meters	2:43.3		
1970	Estentor	4	Albênzio Barroso	A. P. Silva	Luis R. Lima Espinola	Haras Rio dos Frades	2400 meters	2:39.0		
1969	Masteréu	7	Isao Ohya	A. Santos	Haras Tamandaré	Haras Jahú e Rio das Pedras	2400 meters	2:38.5		
1968	Dilema	5	Antônio Ricardo	A. Magalhães	Stud Maioral	Haras Terra Branca	2400 meters	2:40.8		
1967	Messidor	5	J. G. Silva	C. Borges	Haras Jahú e Rio das Pedras	Haras Jahú e Rio das Pedras	2400 meters	2:41.3		
1966	Gastão	4	Urias Bueno	R. E. Martinez	Paulo José da Costa	Haras Porta do Céu	3000 meters	3:23.0		
1965	Agasajo	4	Pedro Silva	P. Lopes	João Xavier	Haras Uruguay	3000 meters	3:25.5		
1964	El Asteroide	4	Albênzio Barroso	A. P. Silva	Luis R. Lima Espinola	Breno Caldas	3000 meters	3:21.5		
1963	Not run due to equine influenza outbreak									
1962	Gavroche	6	José Alves	J. S. Souza	Stud Assumpção	Haras Artim	3000 meters	3:28.0		
1961	Nyrdhal	4	Pierre Vaz	M. Signoretti	Haras Patente		3000 meters	2:26.8		
1960	Falerno	4	F. Irigoyen	F. Davila	Stud Seabra	Haras Guanabara	3000 meters	3:25.5		
1959	Chaval	4	Antônio Ricardo	R. Morgado	José Miguel Kalil	José Miguel Kalil	3000 meters	3:19.2		
1958	My King		A. Reyna	P. Mello	Júlio Corbetta		3000 meters	3:22.0		
1957	Canavial	4	Luis Rigoni	P. Gusso Jr.	Stud Seabra	Haras Guanabara	3000 meters	3:13.2		
1956	Miguel Ângelo	5	Virgílio Pinheiro Jr.	J. S. Lima	Stud Assumpção		3000 meters	2:13.2		
1955	Salomão	4	Roberto Arede	N. Miltzarek	Atílio Los Tedesco		3000 meters	3:12.2		
1954	Panther	7	G. Silva	L. Tripoddi	Stud Moysés Lupion		3000 meters	3:16.0		
1953	Away	5	F. Irigoyen	M. Almedia	Stud Seabra	Haras La Pomme	3000 meters	3:17.2		
1952	Ferino	4	Olavo Rosa	M. Branco	Almeida Prado & Assumpção		3000 meters	3:25.0		
1951	Superb	5	E. P. Silva	A. Santos	Nelson Lins		3000 meters	3:17.2		
1950	Baronete ƒ	4	D. Rauth	A. Piotto	Frederico Leitner		3000 meters	3:18.4		
1949	Desfeita ƒ	4	C. Bini	A. Piotto	Pedro Alípio A. Camargo		3000 meters	3:17.0		
1948	Guaraz	4	O. Reichel	J. Emrich	Paulo Piza de Lara		3000 meters	3:15.0		
1947	Brote	4	N. Monteiro	R. Oliveira Jr.	Stud Dark Prince		3000 meters	3:19.0		
1946	Camaron	4	S. Rodrigues	R. Oliveira Jr.	Atílio Los Tedesco		3000 meters	3:12.3		
1945	Barba Azul	7	O. Reichel	O. N. Mott	Wanda Berquó		3200 meters	3:37.8		
1944	Truchman	5	Z. Santos	E. Piovezan	Mário de Araújo Marquez		3100 meters	3:31.8		
1943	Mialque	6	E. Vieria	F. Raimundo	J. Kloss e F. Raimundo		3100 meters	3:31.8		
1942	Con Ochos	6	P. Gusso Jr.	H. Souza	Manoel Ribas		3100 meters	3:29.6		
