= Hipódromo Chile =

Horse racing venue in Santiago, Chile

Coordinates: 33.404666°S 70.665062°W

- Interactive map of Hipódromo Chile
- Location: Independencia, Chile
- Date opened: 1904
- Race type: Thoroughbred
- Notable races: Chilean St. Leger (Chi-G1); Gran Premio Hipodromo Chile (Chi-G1); Chilean Guineas (Chi-G1); Gran Criterium (Chi-G1)

Hipódromo Chile is a thoroughbred horse race track in the municipality of Independencia, in the Santiago Metropolitan Region of Chile. It is one of two race tracks in Greater Santiago.

== History ==
The track was founded in 1904 by a group of 19 owners, breeders and supporters. It is one of Chile's three main tracks, the others being Club Hipico de Santiago and Valparaiso Sporting Club.

== Physical attributes ==
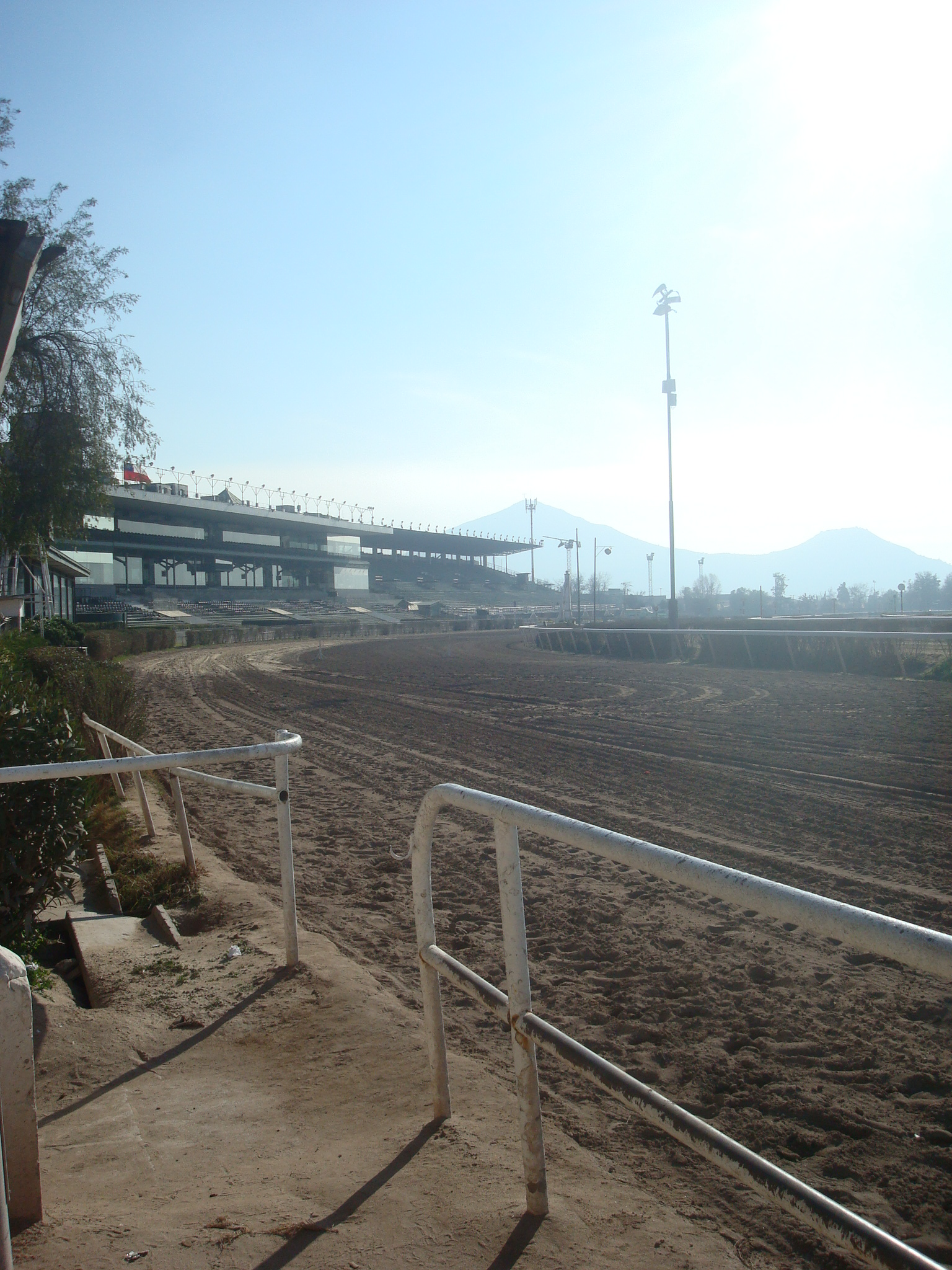
Racetrack.

Hipodromo Chile features a roughly triangular left-handed dirt track of slightly more than 1 mile (exactly 1.645m). Of the three main race tracks in Chile, it is the only one that does not have a turf track.

== Racing ==
Live racing is conducted every Saturday and most Thursdays. As usual for Chile's major tracks, 18 to 20 races on a single raceday are common.

=== 2007 Major Stakes schedule ===
Day	Date	Race (Clasico)	Distance	Age/Sex	Grade
Saturday	May 5	Gran Premio Hipodromo Chile	2200m	3+	G1
Saturday	June 16	Gran Premio de Honor	2400m	3+	G2
Saturday	June 23	Tanteo de Potrancas	1500m	2F	G1
Saturday	June 30	Tanteo de Potrillos	1500m	2M	G1
Saturday	July 14	Pedro del Rio Talavera	2200m	3+	G2
Saturday	July 28	Fernando Moller Bordeu	1600m	3+	G2
Saturday	August 4	Gran Premio Criadores	1600m	3M	G2
Saturday	August 4	GP Criadores Salvador Hess	1500m	3F	G2
Saturday	August 18	Domingo Segundo Herrera	1500m	3M	G2
Saturday	September 1	Mil Guineas	1600m	3F	G1
Sat	September 8	Dos Mil Guineas	1600m	3M	G1
Saturday	October 6	Gran Criterium Mauricio Serrano	1900m	3yo	G1
Saturday	October 20	Independencia	1800m	3F	G2
Saturday	November 10	Alberto Solari Magnasco	2000m	3F	G1
Saturday	December 1	Haras de Chile	2000m	3+ F&M	G2
Saturday	December 15	St. Leger	2200m	3yo	G1
Saturday	December 15	Seleccion de Velocistas	1000m	3+	G2
