= 1996 Preakness Stakes =

121st running of the Preakness Stakes

121st Preakness Stakes
- The Preakness Stakes
- "The Middle Jewel of the Triple Crown" "The Run for the Black-Eyed Susans"
- Location: Pimlico Race Course, Baltimore, Maryland, United States
- Date: May 18, 1996
- Winning horse: Louis Quatorze
- Jockey: Pat Day
- Trainer: Nick Zito
- Conditions: Fast
- Surface: Dirt

The 1996 Preakness Stakes was the 121st running of the Preakness Stakes thoroughbred horse race. The race took place on May 18, 1996, and was televised in the United States on the ABC television network. Louis Quatorze, who was jockeyed by Pat Day, won the race by 3 1/4 lengths over runner-up Skip Away. Approximate post time was 5:33 p.m. Eastern Time. The race was run over a fast track in a final time of 1:53-2/5. The Maryland Jockey Club reported total attendance of 97,751, this is recorded as second highest on the list of American thoroughbred racing top attended events for North America in 1996.

The race did not include Kentucky Derby winner Grindstone, as he was retired five days after his victory, when a bone chip was discovered in his knee. He was the first horse since Bubbling Over in 1926 to be retired immediately following a win in the Kentucky Derby.

== Payout ==
The 121st Preakness Stakes Payout Schedule

Program Number	Horse Name	Win	Place	Show
6	Louis Quatorze	US$19.00	$7.80	$5.20
11	Skip Away	-	$5.60	$4.60
10	Editor's Note	–	–	$5.00

$2 Exacta: (6–11) paid $104.60

$2 Trifecta: (6–11–10) paid $613.40

$1 Superfecta: (6–11–10–2) paid $876.40

== The full chart ==
Finish Position	Margin (lengths)	Post Position	Horse name	Jockey	Trainer	Owner	Post Time Odds	Purse Earnings
1st	0	6	Louis Quatorze	Pat Day	Nick Zito	Candren, Cornacchia & Hofmann	8.50-1	$650,000
2nd	3-1/4	11	Skip Away	Shane Sellers	Hubert Hine	Carolyn H. Hine	3.30-1	$200,000
3rd	6-1/4	10	Editor's Note	Gary Stevens	D. Wayne Lukas	Overbrook Farm	6.50-1	$100,000
4th	8 3/4	2	Cavonnier	Chris McCarron	Bob Baffert	Walter Family Trust	1.70-1 favorite	$50,000
5th	9	3	Victory Speech	René Douglas	D. Wayne Lukas	Susan Magnier	40.60-1	
6th	11	4	In Contention	Alex Solis	Cynthia G. Reese	Noreen Carpenito	19.00-1	
7th	18	9	Prince of Thieves	Jerry Bailey	D. Wayne Lukas	Charles Grimm	4.00-1	
8th	18 1/2	1	Allied Forces	Richard Migliore	Kiaran McLaughlin	Al Tayer Ahmad	20.10-1	
9th	24	5	Secreto de Estado	Cornelio Velásquez	Alfredo Callejas	Robert Perez	103.10-1	
10th	24-1/4	12	Tour's Big Red	Joe Bravo	Enrique Alonso	William Penn	48.40-1	
11th	25	8	Mixed Count	Edgar Prado	Ronald L. Benshoff	Leonard Pearlstein	99.30-1	
12th	33	7	Feather Box	Jorge Velásquez	Ángel Cordero Jr.	Buckland Farm	49.60-1	

- Winning Breeder: Georgia E. Hofmann; (KY)
- Final Time: 1:53 2/5 * Record Time for Fastest Preakness
- Track Condition: Fast
- Total Attendance: 97,751

== See also ==
- 1996 Kentucky Derby
