= Wally (horse) =

Argentine thoroughbred racehorse (1991–2024)

- Sire: Southern Halo
- Grandsire: Halo
- Dam: Welcome
- Damsire: Logical
- Sex: Mare
- Foaled: November 9, 1991
- Died: February 20, 2024
- Country: Argentina
- Colour: Bay
- Breeder: Haras La Quebrada
- Owner: Haras La Quebrada
- Record: 33: 19-5-5
- Earnings: $509,160

Major wins
- Clásico Tomas Lyon (1994, 1996); Gran Premio Ciudad de Buenos Aires (1995); Clásico Francia (1995); Clásico Coronel Pringles (1995, 1996); Gran Premio Estrellas Sprint (1995, 1996, 1997); Clásico Ocurrencia (1995, 1996); Gran Premio Maipú (1995); Gran Premio Félix de Álzaga Unzué (1995); Clásico Santiago Lawrie (1996); Clásico Pippermint (1996); Gran Premio Suipacha (1996)

Awards
- Argentine Champion Sprinter (1996)

Wally (9 November 1991 – 20 February 2024) was an Argentine-bred thoroughbred racehorse best known for winning the Group 1 Gran Premio Estrellas Sprint three times and being named the 1996 Argentine Champion Sprinter. The Paulick Report described her as "pretty much the fastest thing to wear plates in the racing world" during her racing career. She was known as the "reina de la recta" ("queen of the straight"), referencing the straight courses that 1000-meter races, her specialty, are run at.

== Background ==
Wally was a solid bay mare, bred and raced by Haras La Quebrada.

Southern Halo, Wally's sire, was bred in the United States, sired by the notable sire Halo. As a racer, he never quite achieved a stakes race win, although he placed in several. Southern Halo was much more successful as a sire, being named champion sire and broodmare sire in Argentine multiple years and siring notable sire More Than Ready.

Welcome, Wally's dam, was an unraced homebred for Haras La Quebrada. She was sired by Logical, an excellent broodmare sire in Argentina who led the Argentine broodmare sire list four times. Before Wally, Welcome foaled two foals by Salt Marsh, neither of whom was notable as a racehorse. She would go on to foal seven full siblings to Wally as well as a colt by Merce Cunningham, a colt by Louis Quatorze, and two foals by Indygo Shiner. Wally was the most successful of any of her foals and the only stakes winner.

Throughout her career, Wally was trained by Carlos Alberto Zarlengo, who had earlier trained another noted female Argentine sprinter in Spiny.

== Race career ==
=== Two-year-old season (1994) ===
Wally made her debut on April 30, 1994, in a 1200-meter maiden race on the turf at Hipódromo de San Isidro, facing 13 other two-year-old fillies. She started as the favorite and won by 8 lengths. Wally was then stepped up in both distance and class, running in the 1600-meter Group 1 Gran Premio de Potrancas in June. She finished seventh.

She ended her two-year-old campaign with 1 win in 2 starts and earnings of $7,500.

=== Three-year-old season (1994–1995) ===
Wally ran in and won a 1200-meter race for winners of one race shortly after turning three years old. She then ran in the first leg of the Argentine Filly Triple Crown, the 1600-meter Group 1 Gran Premio Polla de Potrancas, where she ran last of 9. She followed this up with a win in a 1100-meter race for winners of one or two races. This was the last time Wally ran at a distance other than her specialty of 1000 meters.

Wally won her first stakes race in December 1994, the Group 2 Clásico Tomás Lyon. She followed this with her first race in open company, the Group 1 Gran Premio Ciudad de Buenos Aires in January 1995. Wally won by 6 lengths. Wally then added wins in the Group 3 Clásico Francia and Group 2 Clásico Coronel Pringles to her win streak before contesting her first Group 1 Gran Premio Estrellas Sprint, which she won by 2 lengths.

Wally's final record for her three-year-old campaign was 7 wins in 8 races, including 2 Group 1 wins, with earnings of $135,400.

=== Four-year-old season (1995–1996) ===
Wally's first race as a four-year-old was the Group 1 Gran Premio Suipacha, where she finished second, a neck behind her rival Preflorada, who would be named the Argentine Champion Sprinter for 1995. Wally faced Preflorada again a week later in the Group 2 Clásico Ocurrencia, which Wally won on disqualification. Preflorada didn't run in the Group 1 Gran Premio Maipú that October, which Wally won by 5 lengths.

Wally ran second to Quebramar in the Group 2 Clásico Venezuela before facing Preflorada again, in the Group 1 Gran Premio Felix de Alzaga Unzué, Wally's last race of 1995. Wally defeated Preflorada by 2 lengths. Preflorada ran once more in 1995, winning the Group 2 Clásico Tomás Lyon.

The two again clashed in first week of 1996 in the Group 1 Gran Premio Ciudad de Buenos Aires, which Wally had won the year prior. Preflorada won by a length. They met again a month later in the Group 3 Clásico Francia, also won by Wally the year before. Preflorada defeated Wally by 5 1/2 lengths in what would end up being Preflorada's final race. The final record between the two was 5 races, with Preflorada winning 3 and Wally winning 2, one of which by disqualification.

Wally then won the Group 2 Clásico Santiago Lawrie and Group 2 Clásico Coronel Pringles in preparation to defend her title in the Group 1 Gran Premio Estrellas Sprint. She won the Gran Premio Estrellas Sprint by 1 1/2 lengths.

Wally's four-year-old campaign ended with 6 wins in 10 starts, finishing second in the other 4, including 3 Group 1 wins and earnings of $203,100.

=== Five-year-old season (1996–1997) ===
The Group 2 Clásico Pippermint was Wally's first race as a five-year-old, which she won, as well as the Group 1 Gran Premio Suipacha and Group 2 Clásico Ocurrencia. She then finished third in the Group 1 Gran Premio Maipú, Group 2 Clásico Cyllene, and Group 1 Gran Premio Félix de Álzaga Unzué before registering one final win to close out 1996, winning the Group 2 Clásico Tomás Lyon.

Wally was named the Argentine Champion Sprinter for 1996, during which she won 7 Group races.

Wally didn't perform to the same level she had previously in 1997, losing five consecutive races leading up to the Carreras de las Estrellas. She was fourth in the Group 1 Gran Premio Ciudad de Buenos Aires, second in the Group 3 Clásico Francia, third in the Group 3 Clásico General Viamonte, sixth in the Group 2 Clásico Coronel Pringles, and third in the Group 3 Clásico Olavarria.

Wally started as favorite as part of a coupled entry with Redama and Old Star in the Group 1 Gran Premio Estrellas Sprint. She won by half a neck, becoming the first horse to win three Carreras de las Estrellas races. She remained the only horse to do so until 2024 when Labrado won his second Gran Premio Estrellas Sprint, having also previously won the Clásico Estrellas Junior Sprint.

As a five-year-old, Wally won 5 of 13 starts, including two Group 1 races, with earnings of $163,160.

In total, Wally won 19 of 33 starts and won 7 Group 1 races.

== Race statistics ==
Date	Age	Distance	Surface	Race	Grade	Track	Odds	Time	Field	Finish	Margin	Jockey	Ref
April 30, 1994	2	1200 meters	Turf	Premio Payalon (1987)	Maiden	Hipódromo de San Isidro	2.75*	1:09.20	14	1	8 lengths	Jacinto R. Herrera	
June 4, 1994	2	1600 meters	Turf	Gran Premio de Potrancas	I	Hipódromo de San Isidro	2.90†	1:35.80	10	7	(12 1/2 lengths)	Rubén Emilio Laitán	
August 7, 1994	3	1200 meters	Dirt	Premio Pendencia	Conditional	Hipódromo Argentino de Palermo	3.00*	1:09.40	6	1	6 lengths	Jacinto R. Herrera	
September 4, 1994	3	1600 meters	Dirt	Gran Premio Polla de Potrancas	I	Hipódromo Argentino de Palermo	4.50†	1:35.52	9	9	(12 1/4 lengths)	Elvio Ramón Bortulé	
November 12, 1994	3	1100 meters	Dirt	Premio L'Express (1992)	Conditional	Hipódromo de San Isidro	1.40*	1:01.80	4	1	2 1/2 lengths	Jacinto R. Herrera	
December 3, 1994	3	1000 meters	Turf	Clásico Tomás Lyon	II	Hipódromo de San Isidro	2.10*	:58.40	7	1	1 1/2 lengths	Jacinto R. Herrera	
January 8, 1995	3	1000 meters	Dirt	Gran Premio Ciudad de Buenos Aires	I	Hipódromo Argentino de Palermo	3.40*	:55.64	9	1	6 lengths	Jacinto R. Herrera	
February 11, 1995	3	1000 meters	Turf	Clásico Francia	III	Hipódromo de San Isidro	1.40*	:55.26	7	1	1 1/2 lengths	Jacinto R. Herrera	
April 17, 1995	3	1000 meters	Dirt	Clásico Coronel Pringles	II	Hipódromo Argentino de Palermo	3.90*	:54.49	9	1	6 lengths	Jacinto R. Herrera	
June 25, 1995	3	1000 meters	Dirt	Gran Premio Estrellas Sprint	I	Hipódromo Argentino de Palermo	2.70*	:54.71	11	1	2 lengths	Jacinto R. Herrera	
September 2, 1995	4	1000 meters	Turf	Gran Premio Suipacha	I	Hipódromo de San Isidro	1.50*	:54.10	9	2	(Neck)	Jacinto R. Herrera	
September 8, 1995	4	1000 meters	Turf	Clásico OcurrencIa	II	Hipódromo de San Isidro	1.55*	:55.30	7	1	DQ	Jacinto R. Herrera	
October 20, 1995	4	1000 meters	Dirt	Gran Premio Maipú	I	Hipódromo Argentino de Palermo	2.60*	:54.59	6	1	5 lengths	Jacinto R. Herrera	
November 26, 1995	4	1000 meters	Dirt	Clásico Venezuela	II	Hipódromo Argentino de Palermo	2.20*	:56.36	4	2	(1/2 head)	Jacinto R. Herrera	
December 2, 1995	4	1000 meters	Turf	Gran Premio Félix de Álzaga Unzué	I	Hipódromo de San Isidro	3.55	:54.21	8	1	2 lengths	Jacinto R. Herrera	
January 7, 1996	4	1000 meters	Dirt	Gran Premio Ciudad de Buenos Aires	I	Hipódromo Argentino de Palermo	1.60*	:55.80	9	2	(1 length)	Jacinto R. Herrera	
February 10, 1996	4	1000 meters	Turf	Clásico Francia	III	Hipódromo de San Isidro	1.65	:55.92	4	2	(5 1/2 lengths)	Jacinto R. Herrera	
March 9, 1996	4	1000 meters	Turf	Clásico Santiago Lawrie	II	Hipódromo de San Isidro	1.45*	:54.53	9	1	2 lengths	Jacinto R. Herrera	
April 21, 1996	4	1000 meters	Dirt	Clásico Coronel Pringles	II	Hipódromo Argentino de Palermo	1.60*	:54.92	11	1	v.m.	Jacinto R. Herrera	
June 29, 1996	4	1000 meters	Dirt	Gran Premio Estrellas Sprint	I	Hipódromo Argentino de Palermo	1.35*	:56.74	10	1	1 1/2 lengths	Jacinto R. Herrera	
July 13, 1996	5	1000 meters	Turf	Clásico Pippermint	II	Hipódromo de San Isidro	1.35*	:58.70	6	1	5 lengths	Jacinto R. Herrera	
September 7, 1996	5	1000 meters	Turf	Gran Premio Suipacha	I	Hipódromo de San Isidro	1.25*	:53.75	8	1	1/2 length	Jacinto R. Herrera	
September 18, 1996	5	1000 meters	Turf	Cláscio Ocurrencia	II	Hipódromo de San Isidro	1.10*	:54.60	4	1	1/2 length	Jacinto R. Herrera	
October 6, 1996	5	1000 meters	Dirt	Gran Premio Maipú	I	Hipódromo Argentino de Palermo	1.45*	:54.16	7	3	(2 1/2 lengths)	Jacinto R. Herrera	
November 23, 1996	5	1000 meters	Turf	Clásico Cyllene	II	Hipódromo de San Isidro	1.25*	:56.10	6	3	(1/2 length)	Jacinto R. Herrera	
December 7, 1996	5	1000 meters	Turf	Gran Premio Félix de Álzaga Unzué	I	Hipódromo de San Isidro	3.30	:55.63	14	3	(5 lengths)	Jacinto R. Herrera	
December 21, 1996	5	1000 meters	Turf	Clásico Tomás Lyon	II	Hipódromo de San Isidro	1.30*	:55.38	5	1	2 lengths	Jacinto R. Herrera	
January 11, 1997	5	1000 meters	Dirt	Gran Premio Ciudad de Buenos Aires	I	Hipódromo Argentino de Palermo	3.60	:55.59	9	4	(2 lengths)	Jacinto R. Herrera	
February 1, 1997	5	1000 meters	Turf	Clásico Francia	III	Hipódromo de San Isidro	1.75*	:54.55	4	2	(1 1/2 lengths)	Juan Carlos Noriega	
March 1, 1997	5	1000 meters	Turf	Clásico General Viamonte	III	Hipódromo de San Isidro	2.00	:54.19	5	3	(4 lengths)	Jacinto R. Herrera	
April 20, 1997	5	1000 meters	Dirt	Clásico Coronel Pringles	II	Hipódromo Argentino de Palermo	5.80	:56.34	8	6	(5 3/4 lengths)	Jacinto R. Herrera	
June 7, 1997	5	1000 meters	Turf	Clásico Olavarria	III	Hipódromo de San Isidro	2.95	:57.64	8	3	(2 lengths)	Jacinto R. Herrera	
June 16, 1997	5	1000 meters	Dirt	Gran Premio Estrellas Sprint	I	Hipódromo Argentino de Palermo	1.70*†	:56.63	12	1	1/2 neck	Rubén Emilio Laitán	

†Part of a coupled entry

An asterisk after the odds means Wally was the post time favorite.

== Broodmare career ==
Wally retired to stud in 1997, being first bred to Mutakddim, a noted sire in Argentina. The resulting foal, Wolf, won three races in Argentina. Wally produced 10 foals, of which 6 raced and 5 won. The most successful was Watch Her, by Mutakddim. Watch Her won 6 stakes races, including the Group 1 Gran Premio Ciudad de Buenos Aires. Watch Her ran in the 2012 Gran Premio Estrellas Sprint, finishing fourth.

Wally produced her last foal in 2008 and was last bred in 2014.

Wally is the second dam of Wanna Dance, winner of the 2013 Group 1 Gran Premio Saturnino J. Unzué.

== Pedigree ==
Pedigree of Wally (ARG), bay mare, foaled 1991
Sire Southern Halo (USA) 1983	Halo (USA); 1969	Hail To Reason (USA)	Turn-To (IRE)
Sire Southern Halo (USA) 1983	Halo (USA); 1969	Hail To Reason (USA)	Nothirdchance (USA)
Sire Southern Halo (USA) 1983	Halo (USA); 1969	Cosmah (USA)	Cosmic Bomb (USA)
Sire Southern Halo (USA) 1983	Halo (USA); 1969	Cosmah (USA)	Almahmoud (USA)
Sire Southern Halo (USA) 1983	Northern Sea (USA); 1974	Northern Dancer (CAN)	Nearctic (CAN)
Sire Southern Halo (USA) 1983	Northern Sea (USA); 1974	Northern Dancer (CAN)	Natalma (USA)
Sire Southern Halo (USA) 1983	Northern Sea (USA); 1974	Sea Saga (USA)	Sea Bird (FR)
Sire Southern Halo (USA) 1983	Northern Sea (USA); 1974	Sea Saga (USA)	Shama (USA)
Dam Welcome (ARG) 1984	Logical (USA); 1972	Buckpasser (USA)	Tom Fool (USA)
Dam Welcome (ARG) 1984	Logical (USA); 1972	Buckpasser (USA)	Busanda (USA)
Dam Welcome (ARG) 1984	Logical (USA); 1972	Smart Deb (USA)	Dedicate (USA)
Dam Welcome (ARG) 1984	Logical (USA); 1972	Smart Deb (USA)	Demree (USA)
Dam Welcome (ARG) 1984	Well Sun (ARG); 1977	Solazo (USA)	Beau Max (USA)
Dam Welcome (ARG) 1984	Well Sun (ARG); 1977	Solazo (USA)	Solar System (GB)
Dam Welcome (ARG) 1984	Well Sun (ARG); 1977	Wilful (GB)	Sing Sing (GB)
Dam Welcome (ARG) 1984	Well Sun (ARG); 1977	Wilful (GB)	Will O The Wisp (GB)
