= Editor's note =

Editor's note may refer to:

- A note made by an editor
- Editor's Note, an American thoroughbred racehorse
