= 1996 Kentucky Derby =

Horse race

122nd Kentucky Derby
- Kentucky Derby
- Location: Churchill Downs
- Date: May 4, 1996
- Winning horse: Grindstone
- Jockey: Jerry Bailey
- Trainer: D. Wayne Lukas
- Owner: Overbrook Farm
- Conditions: Fast
- Surface: Dirt
- Attendance: 142,668

The 1996 Kentucky Derby was the 122nd running of the Kentucky Derby. The race took place on May 4, 1996. There were 142,668 in attendance. The loss by 7-2 favorite Unbridled's Song marked the 17th year in a row that the betting favorite failed to win the race. The winning horse Grindstone was sired by another Kentucky Derby winner, Unbridled.

== Payout ==
The 122nd Kentucky Derby Payout Schedule

Program Number	Horse Name	Win	Place	Show
4	Grindstone	$ 13.80	$6.00	$4.00
3	Cavonnier	-	$6.20	$4.40
8	Prince of Thieves	-	-	$4.60

- $2 Exacta: (2-12) Paid $61.80
- $2 Trifecta: (2-12-7) Paid $600.60
- $1 Superfecta: (2-12-7-3) Paid $5,844.20

== Full results ==
Finished	Post	Horse	Jockey	Trainer	Owner	Time / behind
1st	15	Grindstone	Jerry D. Bailey	D. Wayne Lukas	Overbrook Farm	2:01.06
2nd	4	Cavonnier	Chris McCarron	Bob Baffert	Walter Family Trust	
3rd	10	Prince of Thieves	Pat Day	D. Wayne Lukas	Peter Mitchell	
4th	5	Halo Sunshine	Craig Perret	Richard J. Cross	Henry Pabst	
5th	19	Unbridled's Song	Mike E. Smith	James T. Ryerson	Paraneck Stable	
6th	17	Editor's Note	Gary Stevens	D. Wayne Lukas	Overbrook Farm	
7th	1	Blow Out	Patrick A. Johnson	James O. Keefer	Heiligbrodt & Keefer & New	
8th	12	Alyrob	Corey Nakatani	Wallace Dollase	Four Star Stable	
9th	3	Diligence	Kent Desormeaux	Nick Zito	Kinsman Stable	
10th	2	Victory Speech	José A. Santos	D. Wayne Lukas	Susan Magnier & Michael Tabor	
11th	9	Corker	Corey Black	Charles E. Whittingham	Hancock III & Kinerk & McNair	
12th	16	Skip Away	Shane Sellers	Hubert Hine	Carolyn H. Hine	
13th	7	Zarb's Magic	Ronald Ardoin	Bret Thomas	Foxwood Plantation, Inc.	
14th	6	Semoran	Russell Baze	Bob Baffert	Donald R. Dizney & James E. English	
15th	8	In Contention	Anthony Black	Cynthia G. Reese	Noreen Carpenito	
16th	11	Louis Quatorze	Chris Antley	Nick Zito	Condren & Cornacchia & Hoffman	
17th	18	Matty G	Alex Solis	Ron McAnally	Double J Farm	
18th	13	Honour And Glory	Aaron Gryder	D. Wayne Lukas	Michael Tabor	
19th	14	Built For Pleasure	John Velazquez	Thomas H. Heard Jr.	Thomas H. Heard Jr.	
