= Gran Premio Félix de Álzaga Unzué =

G1 horse race in Argentina

Gran Premio Félix de Álzaga Unzué Internacional
- Class: Group 1
- Location: Hipódromo de San Isidro
- Inaugurated: 1980

Race information
- Distance: 1000 meters
- Surface: Turf
- Qualification: Three years old and older
- Weight: Weight for age
- Purse: $70,000,000 ARS (2025); 1st: $35,000,000 ARS

The Gran Premio Félix de Álzaga Unzué Internacional is a Group 1 horse race run at Hipódromo de San Isidro in Buenos Aires, Argentina, open to horses three years old or older. It is run over a distance of 1000 metres (0.62 mi) on the turf and is considered the most important sprint race in Argentina.

== History ==
The Gran Premio Félix de Álzaga Unzué was inaugurated in 1980 as a Group 1 race, a designation it has retained since. The race is named after the president of the Jockey Club Argentino from 1934 to 1949.

== Records since 1988 ==
Speed record:

- :53.20 – Peluca Fizz (2012)

Greatest winning margin:

- 6 lengths – Strategos (2020)

Most wins:

- 2 – Arellano (2023, 2024)

Most wins by a jockey:

- 5 – Jacinto R. Herrera (1995, 1999, 2001, 2003, 2004)
- 3 – Pablo Gustavo Falero (1996, 2008, 2018)

Most wins by a trainer:

- 4 – Juan Carlos Etchechoury (1989, 1999, 2003, 2004)

Most wins by an owner:

- 3 – Haras La Quebrada (1995, 1999, 2004)

Most wins by a breeder:

- 6 – Haras Vacacion (1990, 1992, 2000, 2006, 2010, 2015)
- 5 – Haras La Quebrada (1998, 1999, 2004, 2018, 2022)
- 5 – Haras El Paraíso (2019, 2021, 2023, 2024, 2025)

== Winners since 1988 ==
Year	Winner	Age	Jockey	Trainer	Owner	Breeder	Time	Length	Ref
2025	El Fortin	3	Lucrecia M. Carabajal	Hector Duval Pérez	Stud San José de Ecuador	Haras El Paraíso	:54.57	1/2 neck	
2024	Arellano	4	Gonzalo Damián Borda	Rodrigo G. Baglietto	Stud Santo Domingo	Haras El Paraíso	:54.80	1/2 length	
2023	Arellano	3	Brian Rodrigo Enrique	Gustavo A. Baglietto	Stud Santo Domingo	Haras El Paraíso	:54.22	1 1/2 lengths	
2022	Just On Time	3	Rodrigo D. Bascuñan	Ángel Roque C. Campora	Stud Valle María	Haras La Quebrada	:54.90	1 length	
2021	Luthier Blues	4	Brian Rodrigo Enrique	Gonzalo Alberto Sarno	Stud Kirby's	Haras El Paraíso	:54.58	1 1/2 lengths	
2020	Strategos	5	F. Fernandes Gonçalves	Nicólas Martín Ferro	Haras Ojos Claros	Haras La Pasion and Haras Ojos Claros	:57.97	6 lengths	
2019	Springdom	3	William Pereyra	Ángel Natividad Bonetto	Stud Fredi	Haras El Paraíso	:55.09	3 lengths	
2018	Elogiado	5	Pablo Gustavo Falero	Lucas Francisco Gaitán	Haras Santa Elena	Haras La Quebrada	:56.49	3/4 length	
2017	Le Perseverant	5	Gustavo E. Calvente	Gustavo Oscar Aon	Stud Juan Antonio	Estancia La Josefina	:55.93	1/2 length	
2016	Nashville Texan	4	Eduardo Ortega Pavón	Alfredo F. Gaitán Dassié	Haras Santa Elena	Haras Santa Maria de Araras	:55.49	1 1/2 lengths	
2015	Tirolesca ƒ	4	Franco A. Calvente	Germán Oscar Feliciani	Stud La Aguada	Haras Vacacion	:56.24	Neck	
2014	Todo Tango Key	4	Rodrigo G. Blanco	Jorge Ricardo Dulom	Haras El Alfafar	Haras El Alfafar	:55.74	1 length	
2013	Venerancia ƒ	4	Osvaldo A. Alderete	Héctor Alfredo Sueldo	High Stud	Haras El Bendito	:54.92	1 1/2 lengths	
2012	Peluca Fizz ƒ	4	Rodrigo G. Blanco	Carlos D. Etchechoury	Stud La Mision	Haras Santa Cecilia	:53.20	1/2 length	
2011	Doña Ley ƒ	3	Julio César Méndez	Carlos D. Etchechoury	Haras San Benito	Haras San Benito	:54.98	Neck	
2010	Claro Oscuro	5	Jorge G. Ruíz Díaz	Orosmán Roberto Toscano	Stud Tobetma	Haras Vacacion	:55.48	1 1/2 lengths	
2009	Lloron Cat	4	Cardenas E. Talaverano	Jorge Roberto Dulom	Haras Al Alfafar	Haras Al Alfafar	:54.16	3 1/2 lengths	
2008	Pryka ƒ	5	Pablo Gustavo Falero	Juan Bautista Udaondo	Haras Vacacion	Haras Don Arcangel	:53.83	1 1/2 lengths	
2007	Misty Lady ƒ	3	José Ricardo Méndez	Jorge A. Mayansky Neer	Haras San Andres	Andres Cordero	:53.27	1 1/2 lengths	
2006	Hollin	5	Julio César Méndez	Fabián Osvaldo David	Stud Principe Nahuel	Haras Vacacion	:53.66	2 lengths	
2005	Honey Rose ƒ	4	Jorge Valdivieso	Hugo Miguel Pérez Sisto	Stud Principiante	Haras Santa Maria de Araras	:53.99	v.m.	
2004	Medal of Honor	4	Jacinto R. Herrera	Juan Carlos Etchechoury	Haras La Quebrada	Haras La Quebrada	:53.56	2 1/2 lengths	
2003	Forty Doriana ƒ	3	Jacinto R. Herrera	Juan Carlos Etchechoury	Haras La Biznaga	Haras La Biznaga	:54.49	Neck	
2002	Shine Bridge ƒ	3	Horacio J. Betansos	Hector R. Pavarini	Stud Las Telas	Susana Beatriz Zappetini	:54.98	v.m.	
2001	Camire Toss ƒ	4	Jacinto R. Herrera	Julio César Rodríguez	Stud Tres Jotas	Juan José Caligiuri	:53.82	3 1/2 lengths	
2000	Estambul	3	Luiz Carlos Villalba	Horacio José A. Torres	Stud Rey de Reyes	Haras Vacacion	:54.21	Head	
1999	My Halo	4	Jacinto R. Herrera	Juan Carlos Etchechoury	Haras La Quebrada	Haras La Quebrada	:53.34	1 1/2 lengths	
1998	Final Meeting	3	Néstor Nicolás Oviedo	Hector R. Pavarini	Stud Las Telas	Haras La Quebrada	:54.13	2 lengths	
1997	Turco Zaino	4	Juan José Paulé	Eduardo Apphatie	José Lujan	Luis Antonio Merlo	:56.79	1/2 head	
1996	Emigrant	4	Pablo Gustavo Falero	Carlos A. Alcaraz	Stud San Francisco R.	Haras Abolengo	:55.63	5 lengths	
1995	Wally ƒ	4	Jacinto R. Herrera	Carlos Alberto Zarlengo	Haras La Quebrada	C. Ceriani and Sara C. Ferrer Reyes	:54.21	2 lengths	
1994	Quitur Ju	4	Guillermo E. Sena	Oscar Marcelo Rodríguez	Haras Alca-Ju	Haras Alca-Ju	:54.4	3 lengths	
1993	Paranoide	5	Elvio Ramón Bortulé	Luis Santiago Bedoya	Stud Tuturtaina	Emilio Delgado	:55	Nose	
1992	Wooden Girl ƒ	4	Rubén Emilio Laitán	Ever W. Perdomo	Stud Bahia Blanca	Haras Vacacion	:54.8	1/2 length	
1991	Othellina ƒ	7		Ricardo A. Goldscheidt	Haras La Veronica	Ricardo Alberto Goldscheidt	:54.2	Neck	
1990	La Esperanza ƒ	4		Alfredo F. Gaitán Dassié	Haras Vacacion	Haras Vacacion	:55.2	4 lengths	
1989	Capo Maximo	4	Jorge S. Caro Araya	Juan Carlos Etchechoury	Stud Haras La Estancia	Haras Abolengo	:54.0	5 lengths	
1988	Preciosura ƒ	5	Miguel Ángel Sarati		Stud La Reforma	Haras El Candil	:55.2	1/2 head	

ƒ indicates a filly/mare

== Earlier winners ==
- 1980: Osorno
- 1981: Montebello
- 1982: The Fog
- 1983: Hard Up ƒ
- 1984: Librado
- 1986 (Jan): Pitador
- 1986 (Dec): Mali
- 1987: Lucky Jump

ƒ indicates a filly/mare
