= Gran Premio Estrellas Sprint =

Group 1 horse race in Argentina

- Class: Group 1
- Inaugurated: 1992

Race information
- Distance: 1000 meters
- Surface: Varies
- Track: Hipódromo de San Isidro or Hipódromo Argentino de Palermo
- Qualification: Three-years-old and up
- Purse: $48,000,000 ARS (2026); 1st: $30,000,000 ARS

The Gran Premio Estrellas Sprint is a Group 1 horse race that is part of the Carreras de las Estrellas and is open to horses three years old or older. It is run over a distance of 1000 metres (0.62 mi) either on the turf at Hipódromo de San Isidro or on the dirt at the Hipódromo Argentino de Palermo.

== History ==
The Gran Premio Estrellas Sprint was added to the Carreras de las Estrellas in its second year, 1992. That first year, the race was restricted to three-year-olds only. Since then, the race has been run under a variety of age conditions, as follows:

- Three-year-olds: 1992
- Two-years-old and up: 2009–2011
- Three-years-old and up: 1995–2008, 2012–2019, 2021–
- Four-years-old and up: 1993–1994, 2020

The Gran Premio Estrellas Sprint is inspired by the Breeders' Cup Sprint.

The winner the first year, Gold Spring, had won the inaugural Gran Premio Estrellas Junior Sprint the year before. This feat has since been accomplished by 2002 winner Mister Phone (won 2000 Junior Sprint), 2015 winner Feel the Race (won 2014 Junior Sprint), and 2023 and 2024 winner Labrado (won 2022 Junior Sprint).

Wally won the Gran Premio Estrellas Sprint three times, 1995, 1996, and 1997, making her the only horse to win the same Estrellas race three times. Labrado, the only other horse to win three Estrellas races, won two of them in the Gran Premio Estrellas Sprint.

In 2012, the Gran Premio Estrellas Sprint was restricted to winners only.

== Records ==
Speed record:

- :53.77 – Compasivo Cat (2008)

Greatest winning margin:

- 6 lengths – Luthier Blues (2022)

Most wins:

- 3 – Wally (1995, 1996, 1997)
- 2 – Elogiado (2018, 2019)
- 2 – Labrado (2023, 2024)
- 2 – Le Cornette (2025, 2026)

Most wins by a jockey:

- 7 – Pablo Gustavo Falero (1994, 1999, 2010, 2011, 2015, 2018, 2019)
- 5 – Jacinto R. Herrera (1992, 1995, 1996, 1998, 2000)

Most wins by a trainer:

- 3 – Juan Carlos Etchechoury (1992, 2000, 2004)
- 3 – Carlos Alberto Zarlengo (1995, 1996, 1997)
- 3 – Ángel Natividad Bonetto (2014, 2023, 2024)

Most wins by an owner:

- 3 – Haras La Quebrada (1995, 1996, 1997)
- 3 – Stud Rubio B. (2007, 2020, 2021)

Most wins by a breeder:

- 7 – Haras La Quebrada (1995, 1996, 1997, 1998, 2003, 2018, 2019)
- 4 – Haras Vacación (1994, 1999, 2002, 2014)
- 4 – Haras La Pasión (2016, 2017, 2020, 2021)
- 3 – Haras El Paraíso (2022, 2023, 2024)

== Winners ==
Year	Winner	Age	Jockey	Trainer	Owner	Breeder	Cond	Surface	Track	Time	Margin	Ref
2026	Le Cornette	6	William Pereyra	Miguel Ángel B. Medina	Stud Chajari	Haras La Generacion	3+	Turf	Hipódromo de San Isidro	:57.64	1/2 neck	
2025	Le Cornette	5	Jairo Emanuel Flores	Gerardo Nicolás Alteño	Stud Chajari	Haras La Generacion	3+	Dirt	Hipódromo Argentino de Palermo	:56.59	4 lengths	
2024	Labrado	4	Wilson R. Moreyra	Ángel Natividad Bonetto	Stud Don Ariel	Haras El Paraíso	3+	Turf	Hipódromo de San Isidro	:58.18	3 lengths	
2023	Labrado	3	Wilson R. Moreyra	Ángel Natividad Bonetto	Stud Don Ariel	Haras El Paraíso	3+	Turf	Hipódromo de San Isidro	:56.11	1/2 length	
2022	Luthier Blues	4	Rodrigo Gonzalo Blanco	Alberto Sarno Gonzalo	Stud Kirby's	Haras El Paraíso	3+	Dirt	Hipódromo Argentino de Palermo	:54.46	6 lengths	
2021	Queen Liz ƒ	6	F. Fernandes Gonçalves	Daniel Alberto Bordon	Stud Rubio B.	Haras La Pasión	3+	Dirt	Hipódromo Argentino de Palermo	:54.50	1 length	
2020	Humorada Negra ƒ	5	José A. Da Silva	Miguel Ángel J. Velazco	Stud Rubio B.	Haras La Pasión	4+	Dirt	Hipódromo Argentino de Palermo	:54.82	1 1/2 lengths	
2019	Elogiado	5	Pablo Gustavo Falero	Lucas Francisco Gaitán	Stud Santa Elena	Haras La Quebrada	3+	Dirt	Hipódromo Argentino de Palermo	:53.94	Head	
2018	Elogiado	5	Pablo Gustavo Falero	Nicolás Alfredo Gaitán	Stud Santa Elena	Haras La Quebrada	3+	Dirt	Hipódromo Argentino de Palermo	:55.37	1 1/2 lengths	
2017	Humor Ácido	5	Eduardo Ortega Pavón	Luis Abelardo Gaitán	Stud La Tutina	Haras La Pasión	3+	Turf	Hipódromo de San Isidro	:56.76	4 lengths	
2016	Santillano	4	Facuno Marcelo Coria	María Fernanda Álvarez	Juan Antonio	Haras La Pasión	3+	Dirt	Hipódromo Argentino de Palermo	:56.19	Nose	
2015	Feel the Race ƒ	3	Pablo Gustavo Falero	Carlos D. Etchechoury	Haras Santa Maria de Araras	Haras Santa Maria de Araras	3+	Turf	Hipódromo de San Isidro	:55.14	2 1/2 lengths	
2014	Lenovo	3	Gustavo E. Calvente	Ángel Natividad Bonetto	Stud La Juventus	Haras Vacacion	3+	Dirt	Hipódromo Argentino de Palermo	:55.44	4 lengths	
2013	She's Happy ƒ	3	Eduardo Ortega Pavón	Alfredo F. Gaitán Dassié	Haras Futuro	Haras Futuro	3+	Turf	Hipódromo de San Isidro	:55.09	2 lengths	
2012	Don Pedal	5	Mario E. Fernández	Hector Horacio Yedro	Stud Rio Gualeguay	Haras San Benito	3+	Dirt	Hipódromo Argentino de Palermo	:54.43	1/2 neck	
2011	Evo Emperor	4	Pablo Gustavo Falero	Rubén Enrique Fermani	Stud Globo Azul	Haras Firmamento	2+	Turf	Hipódromo de San Isidro	:58.88	2 lengths	
2010	Qué Vida Buena	4	Pablo Gustavo Falero	Juan Carlos Etchechoury	Haras Santa Maria de Araras	Haras Santa Maria de Araras	2+	Dirt	Hipódromo Argentino de Palermo	:57.67	2 1/2 lengths	
2009	El Noi	5	Adrián M. Giannetti	Hugo Miguel Pérez Sisto	Stud La Oriana	Norberto Peluso	2+	Turf	Hipódromo de San Isidro	:53.88	Head	
2008	Compasivo Cat	4	Gustavo E. Calvente	Roberto Pellegatta	Stud Aladino	Haras El Alfalfar	3+	Dirt	Hipódromo Argentino de Palermo	:53.77	1/2 length	
2007	Storm Marcopolo	3	Jorge Antonio Ricardo	Juan Javier Etchechoury	Stud Rubio B.	Haras La Biznaga	3+	Turf	Hipódromo de San Isidro	:54.98	3/4 length	
2006	Trenzador	4	Abel Lujan J. Giorgis	José María Giménez	Stud Green and Black	Haras de la Pomme	3+	Dirt	Hipódromo Argentino de Palermo	:53.94	2 lengths	
2005	Vital Class	3	Abel Lujan J. Giorgis	Carlos A. Santiñaque	Stud Emi y Eva	Haras Divisadero	3+	Turf	Hipódromo de San Isidro	:54.38	2 1/2 lengths	
2004	Miss Victory ƒ	4	Damián Ramella	Juan Carlos Etchechoury	Haras Firmamento	Haras Firmamento	3+	Dirt	Hipódromo Argentino de Palermo	:54.22	3/4 length	
2003	Luna Real ƒ	3	Armando C. Glades	Hugo Daniel Sanagua	Stud Nimanor	Haras La Quebrada	3+	Turf	Hipódromo de San Isidro	:58.06	3/4 length	
2002	Mister Phone	4	Fabián Antonio Rivero	Roberto M. Bullrich	Five and Me	Haras Vacacion	3+	Dirt	Hipódromo Argentino de Palermo	:55.31	2 1/2 lengths	
2001	Taimazov	4	Juan Pablo Lagos	Sabatino A. Scabone	Stud Milenium	Haras Don Arcángel	3+	Turf	Hipódromo de San Isidro	:55.03	3/4 length	
2000	Dionisio Tom	4	Jacinto R. Herrera	Juan Carlos Etchechoury	Stud Good Friends	Haras La Biznaga	3+	Dirt	Hipódromo Argentino de Palermo	:53.89	3 lengths	
1999	Vacacionada ƒ	3	Pablo Gustavo Falero	Juan Carlos Maldotti	Haras Vacacion	Haras Vacacion	3+	Turf	Hipódromo de San Isidro	:55.00	1/2 length	
1998	Matthis	3	Jacinto R. Herrera	Roberto A. Pellegatta	Stud Cholin	Haras La Quebrada	3+	Dirt	Hipódromo Argentino de Palermo	:55.59	1 1/2 lengths	
1997	Wally ƒ	5	Rubén Emilio Laitán	Carlos Alberto Zarlengo	Haras La Quebrada	Haras La Quebrada	3+	Dirt	Hipódromo Argentino de Palermo	:56.63	1/2 neck	
1996	Wally ƒ	4	Jacinto R. Herrera	Carlos Alberto Zarlengo	Haras La Quebrada	Haras La Quebrada	3+	Dirt	Hipódromo Argentino de Palermo	:56.74	1 1/2 lengths	
1995	Wally ƒ	3	Jacinto R. Herrera	Carlos Alberto Zarlengo	Haras La Quebrada	Haras La Quebrada	3+	Dirt	Hipódromo Argentino de Palermo	:54.71	2 lengths	
1994	La Baraca ƒ	4	Pablo Gustavo Falero	Carlos D. Etchechoury	Haras Vacacion	Haras Vacacion	4+	Turf	Hipódromo de San Isidro	:57.0	1 1/2 lengths	
1993	Bombazo Toss	4	Cornelio José Reynoso	Eduardo Oscar Ferro	Stud Augusto	Haras Rincón de Luna	4+	Turf	Hipódromo de San Isidro	:55.6	1 1/2 lengths	
1992	Gold Spring	3	Jacinto R. Herrera	Juan Carlos Etchechoury	Stud Matty	Haras Las Matildes	3	Turf	Hipódromo de San Isidro	:57.8		

ƒ Indicates a filly or mare winner
