= Gran Premio Suipacha =

Group 1 horse race in Argentina

- Class: Group 1
- Location: Hipódromo de San Isidro
- Inaugurated: 1981

Race information
- Distance: 1000 meters
- Surface: Turf
- Qualification: Three-years-old and up
- Weight: Weight for age
- Purse: $50,000,000 ARS (2026); 1st: $25,000,000 ARS

The Gran Premio Suipacha is a Group 1 horse race run at Hipódromo de San Isidro in Buenos Aires, Argentina, open to horses three years old or older. It is run over a distance of 1000 metres (0.62 mi) on the turf.

== History ==
The modern Gran Premio Suipacha was first run in 1981. It was inaugurated as a Group 1 race, a designation it has retained since. Since its inauguration, the race has been run under the same conditions of 1000 meters on the turf.

Previously, a race called the Premio Suipacha was run at Hipódromo Argentino de Palermo from 1909. From 1923 to 1924, the race was run as the Premio Juan Shaw. Another race known as the Clásico Suipacha was from 1925 to 1929 and 1944 to 1946.

== Records since 1988 ==
Speed record:

- :53.75 – Wally (1996)

Greatest winning margin:

- 5 lengths – Strategos (2020)

Most wins:

- 3 – Labrado (2022, 2023, 2025)
- 2 – Spiny (1989, 1990)
- 2 – Crazy Plus (2008, 2009)

In addition, Fumador won twice in 1982 and 1983

Most wins by a jockey:

- 4 – Jacinto R. Herrera (1990, 1996, 1999, 2003)
- 4 – Gustavo E. Calvente (2007, 2014, 2016, 2017)
- 3 – Jorge Valdivieso (1994, 2002, 2004)
- 3 – Wilson R. Moreyra (2022, 2023, 2025)

Most wins by a trainer:

- 3 – Carlos Alberto Zarlengo (1990, 1996, 1999)
- 3 – Ángel Natividad Bonetto (2014, 2022, 2023)

Most wins by an owner:

- 4 – Haras La Quebrada (1989, 1990, 1996, 1999)
- 3 – Stud Don Ariel (2022, 2023, 2025)

Most wins by a breeder:

- 6 – Haras La Quebrada (1989, 1990, 1996, 1998, 1999, 2001)
- 5 – Haras El Paraíso (2021, 2022, 2023, 2024, 2025)
- 3 – Haras Vacacion (1991, 2002, 2014)
- 3 – Haras La Pasion (2016, 2018, 2019)

== Winners since 1988 ==
Year	Winner	Age	Jockey	Trainer	Owner	Breeder	Margin	Time	Ref
2026	Es Por Amor	4	Pablo Damián Carrizo	Pablo Ezequiel Sahagián	Stud La Palmera	Juan Antonio	3/4 length	:56.11	
2025	Labrado	6	Wilson R. Moreyra	Ángel Natividad Bonetto	Stud Don Ariel	Haras El Paraiso	1 1/2 lengths	:54.90	
2024	Ansia Clara ƒ	4	Iván E. Monasterolo	G. Frenkel Santillán	Stud Los Patrios	Haras El Paraiso	1/2 head	:54.04	
2023	Labrado	4	Wilson R. Moreyra	Ángel Natividad Bonetto	Stud Don Ariel	Haras El Paraiso	1 1/2 lengths	:53.91	
2022	Labrado	3	Wilson R. Moreyra	Ángel Natividad Bonetto	Stud Don Ariel	Haras El Paraiso	1 1/2 lengths	:55.55	
2021	Senegalesca	3	Wiliam Pereyra	Juan Franco Saldivia	Stud Haras Yo Gruigi	Haras El Paraiso	v.m.	:54.44	
2020	Strategos	5	Francisco Fernandes Goncalves	Nicolas Martin Ferro	Haras Ojos Claros	Haras La Pasion y Ojos Claros	5 lengths	:55.88	
2019	Calzonetti	3	Brian Rodrigo Enrique	Maria Fernanda Alvarez	Stud El Clan Corrientes	Haras La Pasion	1/2 length	:58.82	
2018	Café Fuerte	5	Jose Ernesto Leonardo	Armando R. Cervantes	Stud Mama Adela	Haras La Pasion	1 length	:54.13	
2017	Don Chullo	6	Gustavo E. Calvente	Hector Gustavo Calvente	Juan Antonio	Haras San Benito	1 1/2 lengths	:56.52	
2016	Santillano	5	Gustavo E. Calvente	Maria Fernanda Alvarez	Juan Antonio	Haras La Pasion	2 lengths	:57.15	
2015	Sassagoula Springs ƒ	3	Eduardo Ortega Pavon	Marcelo Claudio J. Sumpf	Heritage Stud	Heritage Bloodstock	3/4 length	:54.44	
2014	Lenovo	4	Gustavo E. Calvente	Ángel Natividad Bonetto	Stud La Juventus	Haras Vacacion	1/2 length	:57.17	
2013	Venerancia ƒ	4	Osvaldo A. Alderete	Hector Alfredo Sueldo	High Stud	Haras El Bendito	Head	:55.64	
2012	Animas ƒ	3	Eduardo Ortega Pavon	Nicolas Alfredo Gaitan	Haras Pozo de Luna	Haras Pozo de Luna	1 length	:54.10	
2011	Doña Ley ƒ	3	Juan Cruz Costa	Carlos D. Etchechoury	Haras San Benito	Haras San Benito	3/4 length	:54.48	
2010	El Azor	6	Cardenas E. Talaverano	Carlos Americo Fali	Stud Pilatero	Miguel Angel Repetto	Neck	:54.21	
2009	Crazy Plus	6	José Ricardo Mendez	Abel Horacio Curcci	Stud El Charabon	Haras Panamericano	Neck	:54.22	
2008	Crazy Plus	5	Jorge Antonio Ricardo	Anibal Alegre	Stud El Charabon	Haras Panamericano	Head	:54.65	
2007	Compasivo Cat	3	Gustavo E. Calvente	Roberto Pellegatta	Stud Aladino	Haras El Alfalfar	3/4 length	:53.77	
2006	Knock	5	Jorge Antonio Ricardo	Edmundo I. Rodriguez	Stud Arcangle	Haras Don Arcangel	1 1/2 lengths	:56.24	
2005	Vital Class	4	Abel Lujan Jose Giorgis	Carlos A. Santiñaque	Stud Emi y Eva	Roque Melluso	4 lengths	:54.82	
2004	Forty Doriana ƒ	4	Jorge Valdivieso	Juan Carlos Etchechoury	Haras La Biznaga	Haras La Biznaga	2 lengths	:53.94	
2003	Sebi Halo	5	Jacinto R. Herrera	Ernesto Eusebio Romero	Stud Carmari	Stud Carmari	1/2 neck	:55.64	
2002	Mister Phone	5	Jorge Valdivieso	Roberto M. Bullrich	Stud Five and Me	Haras Vacacion	3 lengths	:55.53	
2001	Venusino	7	Juan Jose Paule	Hugo R. Lopez	Stud Comaf	Haras La Quebrada	v.m.	:54.76	
2000	Taimazov	4	Juan Pablo Lagos	Sabatino A. Scabone	Stud Milenium	Haras Don Arcangel	1/2 length	:55.42	
1999	New Heaven ƒ	5	Jacinto R. Herrera	Carlos Alberto Zariengo	Haras La Quebrada	Haras La Quebrada	1 1/2 lengths	:54.73	
1998	Final Meeting	3	Nestor Nicolas Oviedo	Hector R. Pavarini	Stud El Telon	Haras La Quebrada	2 1/2 lengths	:56.03	
1997	Capo d'Oro	4	Abel Lujan Jose Giorgis	Oscar E. Yedro	Haras Guer Aike	Haras Guer Aike	Head	:54.67	
1996	Wally ƒ	5	Jacinto R. Herrera	Carlos Alberto Zariengo	Haras La Quebrada	Haras La Quebrada	1/2 length	:53.75	
1995	Preflorada ƒ	4	Guillermo E. Sena	Luis Crosato	Stud Haras Vencedor		Neck	:54.10	
1994	El Rey Sol	5	Jorge Valdivieso	Emilio M. Vital	Stud Iam Glad	Haras de la Pomme	Head	:55.8	
1993	Paranoide	5	Elvio Ramon Bortule	Luis Santiago Bedoya	Stud Tuturutaina	Emilio Delgado	DQ	:56.8	
1992	Pancho Press	5	Fabian Antonio Rivero		Stud D.M.A. (LP)	Haras Don Simeon	Head	:55.6	
1991	Rechifilo	4	Miguel Angel Sarati		Stud A.R.C.	Haras Vacacion	Neck	:55.8	
1990	Spiny ƒ	5	Jacinto R. Herrera	Carlos Alberto Zariengo	Haras La Quebrada	Haras La Quebrada		:56.8	
1989	Spiny ƒ	4	Elvio Ramon Bortule		Haras La Quebrada	Haras La Quebrada	1 1/2 lengths	:55.4	
1988	Punk	4	Vilmar Sanguinetti	Elias Pascual Domingo	Stud Carmel	Haras Abolengo	1/2 length	:57.2	

ƒ indicates a filly/mare

== Earlier winners ==
- 1981: Montebello
- 1982: Fumador
- 1983: Fumador
- 1984: Librado
- 1985: Lupín
- 1986: Arg High Command ƒ
- 1987: Billy Sweet

ƒ indicates a filly/mare
