= Gran Premio Maipú =

Group 1 horse race in Argentina

- Class: Group 1
- Location: Hipódromo Argentino de Palermo
- Inaugurated: 1894

Race information
- Distance: 1000 meters
- Surface: Dirt
- Qualification: Three years old and older
- Weight: Weight for age
- Purse: $68,160,000 ARS (2025); 1st: $32,000,000 ARS

The Gran Premio Maipú (previously Premio Maipú) is a Group 1 horse race run at Hipódromo Argentino de Palermo open to horses three years old or older. It is run over a distance of 1000 metres (0.62 mi) on the dirt.

== History ==
The Gran Premio Maipú was first run in 1894 as the Premio Maipú.

When the pattern race system was introduced in Argentina in 1973, the Premio Maipú was rated as a Group 2 race. It was upgraded to a Group 1 race in 1979, a designation it has retained since.

== Records since 1988 ==
Speed record:

- :54.16 – El Gran Gringo (1996)

Greatest winning margin:

- 5 1/2 lengths – Capo d'Oro (1997)

Most wins:

- 2 – Spiny (1990, 1991)
- 2 – Charles King (2011, 2012)
- 2 – Labrado (2022, 2024)

In addition, Melgarejo won twice in 1907 and 1908, Petite Chose in 1915 and 1916, Moloch in 1918 and 1920, Nereida in 1933 and 1934, Cimarrón in 1962 and 1963, and Sumatra in 1986 and 1987.

Most wins by a jockey:

- 6 – Jacinto R. Herrera (1990, 1991, 1995, 1999, 2003, 2004)
- 4 – Wilson R. Moreyra (2018, 2019, 2022, 2024)
- 3 – Jorge Valdivieso (1989, 1996, 2002)
- 3 – Pablo Gustavo Falero (2000, 2005, 2008)
- 3 – Jorge Antonio Ricardo (2006, 2007, 2011)

Most wins by a trainer:

- 5 – Carlos Alberto Zarlengo (1990, 19961, 1995, 1999, 2003)
- 3 – Ángel Natividad Bonetto (2014, 2022, 2024)

Most wins by an owner:

- 6 – Haras La Quebrada (1990, 1991, 1995, 1999, 2003, 2004)

Most wins by a breeder:

- 9 – Haras La Quebrada (1990, 1991, 1995, 1998, 1999, 2003, 2004, 2017, 2019)
- 4 – Haras Vacacion (12000 2002, 2014, 2015)
- 3 – Haras Panamericano (2010, 2011, 2012)
- 3 – Haras El Paraíso (2021, 2022, 2024)

== Winners since 1988 ==
Year	Winner	Age	Jockey	Trainer	Owner	Breeder	Margin	Time	Ref
2025	El Epecuen	5	Juan Cruz Villagra	Miguel Ángel Cafere	Stud Mamina	Haras El Paraiso	1 length	:56.36	
2024	Labrado	5	Wilson R. Moreyra	Ángel Natividad Bonetto	Stud Emilio	Haras El Paraiso	Head	:56.59	
2023	El Porfeado	3	William Pereyra	Mauro Ramón Linares	Stud La Bianca	Dodera Nahuel Diogenes	Head	:54.80	
2022	Labrado	3	Wilson R. Moreyra	Ángel Natividad Bonetto	Stud Don Ariel	Haras El Paraiso	Neck	:56.03	
2021	Luthier Blues	4	Brian Rodrigo Enrique	Gonzalo Alberto Sarno	Stud Kirby's	Haras El Paraiso	2 lengths	:55.23	
2020	Strategos	5	F. Fernandes Gonçalves	Nicólas Martín Ferro	Haras Ojos Claros	Haras La Pasion Sci y Ojos Claros	1 length	:54.73	
2019	Art Show	4	Wilson R. Moreyra	María Fernanda Álvarez	Stud El Fenicio	Haras La Quebrada	2 1/2 lengths	:56.01	
2018	Holly Woman ƒ	5	Wilson R. Moreyra	Alberto Fabián Urruti	Stud Famago	Haras San Ignacio de Loyola	Head	:55.96	
2017	Legion de Honor	3	Eduardo Ortega Pavón	Enrique Martín Ferro	Stud Indio Rubio	Haras La Quebrada	4 lengths	:54.62	
2016	Sassagoula Springs ƒ	4	Altair Domingos	José Luis Palacios	Heritage Stud	Heritage Bloodstock	3 lengths	:54.47	
2015	Tirolesca ƒ	4	Franco Alberto Calvente	Germán Oscar Feliciani	Stud La Aguada	Haras Vacacion	5 lengths	:54.91	
2014	Lenovo	4	Gustavo E. Calvente	Ángel Natividad Bonetto	Stud La Juventus	Haras Vacacion	2 lengths	:54.54	
2013	Venerancia ƒ	4	Osvaldo Adrián Alderete	Héctor Alfredo Sueldo	High Stud	Haras El Bendito	3 lengths	:56.00	
2012	Charles King	6	Eduardo Ortega Pavón	Martín Miguel Garrido	Stud La Reina	Haras Panamericano	2 lengths	:56.36	
2011	Charles King	5	Jorge Antonio Ricardo	Martín Miguel Garrido	Stud La Reina	Haras Panamericano	1 length	:55.52	
2010	Augurio Plus	6	José Ricardo Méndez	Abel Horacio Crucci	Stud El Charabon	Haras Panamericano	2 1/2 lengths	:55.59	
2009	Lloron Cat	4	Cardenas E. Talaverano	Jorge Ricardo Dulom	Haras El Alfalfar	Haras El Alfalfar	3/4 length	:55.15	
2008	Pryka ƒ	5	Pablo Gustavo Falero	Juan Bautista Udaondo	Haras Vacacion	Haras Don Arcangel	2 1/2 lengths	:55.37	
2007	Lady Sprinter ƒ	4	Jorge Antonio Ricardo	Juan Javier Etchechoury	Stud Rubio B.	Gainesway Farm	2 lengths	:54.54	
2006	Knock	5	Jorge Antonio Ricardo	Edmundo I. Rodríguez	Stud Arcangel	Haras Don Arcangel	1 1/2 lengths	:55.81	
2005	Anjiz Star ƒ	4	Pablo Gustavo Falero	Juan Carlos Maldotti	Stud America	Jorge Miguel Roberts	2 1/2 lengths	:55.48	
2004	Medal of Honor	4	Jacinto Rafael Herrera	Juan Carlos Etchechoury	Haras La Quebrada	Haras La Quebrada	2 1/2 lengths	:55.14	
2003	First One ƒ	5	Jacinto Rafael Herrera	Carlos Alberto Zarlengo	Haras La Quebrada	Haras La Quebrada	1 1/2 lengths	:54.87	
2002	Mister Phone	5	Jorge Valdivieso	Roberto M. Bullrich	Stud Five and Me	Haras Vacacion	Neck	:54.21	
2001	Petite West ƒ	5	Cardenas E. Talaverano	Hector R. Pavarini	Stud Las Telas	José Campagna and Antonio Perrone	3/4 length	:58.05	
2000	Impression	4	Pablo Gustavo Falero	Juan Carlos Maldotti	Haras Vacacion	Haras Vacacion	2 lengths	:56.77	
1999	New Heaven ƒ	5	Jacinto Rafael Herrera	Carlos Alberto Zarlengo	Haras La Quebrada	Haras La Quebrada	1 length	:57.62	
1998	Final Meeting	3	Néstor Nicolás Oviedo	Hector R. Pavarini	Stud El Telon	Haras La Quebrada	5 lengths	:56.40	
1997	Capo d'Oro	4	Lujan José Giorgis Abel	Oscar E. Yedro	Haras Guer Aike	Haras Guer Aike	5 1/2 lengths	:56.36	
1996	El Gran Gringo	4	Jorge Valdivieso	Daniel Rene Cima	Stud Don Remigio	Edgard Alberto Ciribe	2 lengths	:54.16	
1995	Wally ƒ	4	Jacinto Rafael Herrera	Carlos Alberto Zarlengo	Haras La Quebrada	Haras La Quebrada	5 lengths	:54.59	
1994	Quitur Ju	4	Guillermo Enrique Sena	Oscar Marcelo Rodriguez	Haras Alca-Ju	Haras Alca-Ju	1/2 length	:57.72	
1993	Bombazo Toss	4	Cornelio José Reynoso	Eduardo Oscar Ferro	Stud Ausuto	Haras Rincon de Luna	3/4 length	:55.04	
1992	Gold Spring	4	Miguel Ángel Sarati	Juan Carlos Etchechoury	Stud Matty	Haras Las Matildes	1 length	:55.30	
1991	Spiny ƒ	6	Jacinto Rafael Herrera	Carlos Alberto Zarlengo	Haras La Quebrada	Haras La Quebrada		:57.07	
1990	Spiny ƒ	5	Jacinto Rafael Herrera	Carlos Alberto Zarlengo	Haras La Quebrada	Haras La Quebrada	1 length	:58.37	
1989	Oh Toss	4	Jorge Valdivieso	Roberto Pellegatta	Haras La Biznaga	Haras La Biznaga	Nose	:55.46	
1988	Battle Toss	3	P. Sahagián	Roberto Pellegatta	Stud Cachito		3/4 length	:55.07	

ƒ indicates a filly/mare

== Earlier winners (incomplete) ==
- 1894: Sargento
- 1895: Mignonnette ƒ
- 1896: Colombia ƒ
- 1897: Brick
- 1898: Alarife
- 1899: Pas-si-Bête ƒ
- 1900: Offembach
- 1901: Royal
- 1902: Balcebú
- 1903: Espuma ƒ
- 1904: Rataplán
- 1905: Celso
- 1906: Old Boy
- 1907: Melgarejo
- 1908: Melgarejo
- 1909: Barsac
- 1910: Aphrodite ƒ
- 1911: Larrea
- 1912: Carlos XII
- 1913: Completa ƒ
- 1914: Heredia
- 1915: Petite Chose ƒ
- 1916: Petite Chose ƒ
- 1917: Remanso
- 1918: Moloch
- 1919: Clamor
- 1920: Moloch
- 1921: Zig Zag
- 1922: Hijo Mío
- 1923: Diógenes
- 1924: Gitanillo
- 1925: Navazio
- 1926: El Machaco
- 1927: Bacacay
- 1928: Cabalista
- 1929: Temple
- 1930: Merezco
- 1931: Magnax
- 1932: Sacrílega ƒ
- 1933: Nereida ƒ
- 1934: Nereida ƒ
- 1939: Comendador
- 1940: Maicena ƒ
- 1941: Chajá
- 1942: Serenísimo
- 1943: Monsalve
- 1944: Snob
- 1945: Plover
- 1946: Envión
- 1947: Rey del Bosque
- 1948: Renown
- 1949: Virsha ƒ
- 1950: Baturro
- 1951: Yacorá ƒ
- 1952: Genium
- 1953: Doria ƒ
- 1954: Teodosio
- 1955: Tatán
- 1956: Nube Clara ƒ
- 1957: Vitelio
- 1958: El Trovadore
- 1959: Ruth ƒ
- 1960: Good Star ƒ
- 1961: Tabac
- 1962: Cimarrón
- 1963: Cimarrón
- 1964: Esporazo
- 1965: Make Money
- 1966: Caro Figlio
- 1967: Tarrito
- 1968: Bonpa
- 1969: Juan Pueblo
- 1970: The Sheriff
- 1971: Malucho
- 1972: India Pura ƒ
- 1973: El Supremo
- 1974: Copelino
- 1975: Sunny Day ƒ
- 1977: Kaljerry
- 1978: Pariguana ƒ
- 1979: Thales
- 1980: Sun Charm ƒ
- 1981: Osorno
- 1982: Montebello
- 1983: Ultraje
- 1984: Librado
- 1985: Prodigo
- 1986: Sumatra ƒ
- 1987: Sumatra ƒ

ƒ indicates a filly/mare
