= Louis Quatorze (horse) =

American-bred Thoroughbred racehorse

- Sire: Sovereign Dancer
- Grandsire: Northern Dancer
- Dam: On To Royalty
- Damsire: On To Glory
- Sex: Stallion
- Foaled: March 13, 1993
- Died: February 17, 2017 (aged 23)
- Country: United States
- Colour: Bay
- Breeder: Georgia E. Hofmann
- Owner: William J. Condren; Georgia E. Hofmann, Cornacchia, A syndicate
- Trainer: Nicholas P. Zito
- Record: 18: 7-5-1
- Earnings: $2,054,434

Major wins
- Jim Dandy Stakes (1996); Hal's Hope Handicap (1997); Ben Ali Stakes (1997); Creme Fraiche Handicap (1997) Triple Crown Race wins: Preakness Stakes (1996)
- Last updated on August 15, 2007

Louis Quatorze (March 13, 1993 - February 17, 2017) was an American thoroughbred racehorse and sire best known for winning the 1996 Preakness Stakes. He was sired by Sovereign Dancer, who in turn was a son of 1964 Kentucky Derby and Preakness Stakes winner Northern Dancer out of the mare On To Royalty.

== Early racing career ==
Trained by Nick Zito, he had four starts at age two in 1995 and won two races while placing second in the other two starts. In the late summer, Louis Quatorze came in second in the seven-furlong Hopeful Stakes at Saratoga Race Course to Hennessy. In mid-September 1995, he finished second in the seven-furlong Futurity Stakes at Belmont Park to Maria's Mon. During the winter, he was freshened for a long time and didn't come back to the track until March.

At age three, Louis Quatorze won an allowance race at Gulfstream Park in March, giving Zito enough confidence in him to take on stakes winners in a graded race. In April 1996, Louis Quatorze shipped to Keeneland Race Course and raced in the grade two $700,000 Blue Grass Stakes, where he placed second in a field of seven. He was beaten only by eventual Eclipse Award champion Skip Away. All three of the top finishers in the Blue Grass moved on to Louisville on the first Saturday of May and competed in the Kentucky Derby. In the Derby itself, Louis Quatorze broke badly and got caught in traffic early, running in twelfth position. He finished sixteenth of nineteen.

== Preakness Stakes ==
Zito and his owners, William J. Condren and Georgia E. Hofmann, believed there was a legitimate reason for Louis Quatorze's loss in the Derby, so they entered him in the Preakness Stakes on the third Saturday in May 1996 at Pimlico Race Course in Baltimore, Maryland. In the race, Zito and jockey Pat Day had a specific plan to take Louis Quatorze to the lead and see if he could settle or slow the pace. At post time, Louis Quatorze went off as the fifth choice at 9–1 in the field of twelve stakes winners. He broke from gate six and shot straight to the lead and angled to the middle of the track away from the rail to avoid traffic. Day thought the pace was moderate, setting fractions of :23 flat and :46-1/5 for the first quarter and half. Near the end of the back stretch, he led Skip Away, Victory Speech and the rest of the field in a record 1:09-4/5 for three quarters of a mile. At the top of the stretch, second favorite Skip Away made a run at Louis Quatorze, closing to within a length. Louis Quatorze pulled away to win in the time of 1:53-2/5, which was thought to equal the stakes record at the time until Secretariat was belatedly recognized with the record of 1:53. The track record of 1:52-2/5 belongs to Farma Way. Skip Away finished 3 1/4 lengths back in second, three lengths in front of Belmont winner Editor's Note and Derby runner-up Cavonnier.

== Later racing career ==
Later that year, Louis Quatorze won the Jim Dandy Stakes, came in second in the Travers Stakes and ran third in the Jockey Club Gold Cup. In November, he placed second to Alphabet Soup in the Breeder's Cup Classic, defeating Cigar, who came in third.

== Retirement ==
Louis Quatorze stood at Murmur Farm in Darlington, Maryland until he died on February 17, 2017, and was buried at the farm. Among his offspring, he had sired graded stakes race winners Repent, Choctaw Nation, and Bushfire.

== Pedigree ==
Pedigree of Louis Quatorze
Sire Sovereign Dancer bay 1975	Northern Dancer bay 1961	Nearctic brown 1954	Nearco
Sire Sovereign Dancer bay 1975	Northern Dancer bay 1961	Nearctic brown 1954	Lady Angela
Sire Sovereign Dancer bay 1975	Northern Dancer bay 1961	Natalma bay 1957	Native Dancer
Sire Sovereign Dancer bay 1975	Northern Dancer bay 1961	Natalma bay 1957	Almahmoud
Sire Sovereign Dancer bay 1975	Bold Princess bay 1960	Bold Ruler brown 1954	Nasrullah
Sire Sovereign Dancer bay 1975	Bold Princess bay 1960	Bold Ruler brown 1954	Miss Disco
Sire Sovereign Dancer bay 1975	Bold Princess bay 1960	Grey Flight gray 1945	Mahmoud
Sire Sovereign Dancer bay 1975	Bold Princess bay 1960	Grey Flight gray 1945	Planetoid
Dam On To Royalty gray 1985	On To Glory gray 1971	Bold Lad chestnut 1962	Bold Ruler
Dam On To Royalty gray 1985	On To Glory gray 1971	Bold Lad chestnut 1962	Misty Morn
Dam On To Royalty gray 1985	On To Glory gray 1971	Shenanigans gray 1963	Native Dancer
Dam On To Royalty gray 1985	On To Glory gray 1971	Shenanigans gray 1963	Bold Irish
Dam On To Royalty gray 1985	Royal Ties dark brown 1973	Distinctive dark brown 1966	Never Bend
Dam On To Royalty gray 1985	Royal Ties dark brown 1973	Distinctive dark brown 1966	Precious Lady
Dam On To Royalty gray 1985	Royal Ties dark brown 1973	New Love dark brown 1963	Pardal
Dam On To Royalty gray 1985	Royal Ties dark brown 1973	New Love dark brown 1963	Stavroula
