= Editor's Note =

American-bred Thoroughbred racehorse

- Sire: Forty Niner
- Grandsire: Mr. Prospector
- Dam: Beware Of The Cat
- Damsire: Caveat
- Sex: Stallion
- Foaled: 1993
- Country: United States
- Colour: Chestnut
- Breeder: Fawn Leap Farm
- Owner: Overbrook Farm
- Trainer: D. Wayne Lukas
- Record: 31: 6-4-3
- Earnings: $1,601,394

Major wins
- Kentucky Cup Juvenile Stakes (1995); Super Derby (1996); Holy Bull Stakes (1996) Triple Crown race wins: Belmont Stakes (1996)
- Last updated on August 16, 2007

Editor's Note (April 26, 1993 - December 12, 2022) was an American thoroughbred racehorse. He was sired by 1992 U.S. Champion 2 YO Colt Forty Niner, who in turn was a son of Champion sire Mr. Prospector and out of the mare Beware Of The Cat.

Trained by D. Wayne Lukas and ridden by René Douglas, who was given the assignment after Gary Stevens was injured, Editor's Note is best known for his classic stretch duel with Skip Away in the 1996 Belmont Stakes, beating Preakness Stakes winner Louis Quatorze, who was unplaced. This was the same race in which the Santa Anita Derby winner, Cavonnier, bowed a tendon and was unable to finish.

With the death of A.P. Indy on February 21, 2020, Editor's Note became the oldest living winner of the Belmont Stakes. Upon the death of Grindstone on March 22, 2022, Editor's Note became the oldest living winner of any of the Triple Crown races of thoroughbred racing.

== Retirement ==
Editor's Note was originally retired in 1997 to Overbrook Farm in Lexington, Kentucky, but was exported in 2004 to Argentina.
