= Grindstone (horse) =

American Thoroughbred racehorse

- Sire: Unbridled
- Grandsire: Fappiano
- Dam: Buzz My Bell
- Damsire: Drone
- Sex: Stallion
- Foaled: January 23, 1993
- Died: March 22, 2022 (aged 29)
- Country: United States
- Colour: Bay
- Breeder: Overbrook Farm
- Owner: Oakhurst Farm
- Trainer: D. Wayne Lukas
- Record: 6: 3-2-0
- Earnings: $1,224,510

Major wins
- Louisiana Derby (1996); Kentucky Derby (1996)

Honors
- Fair Grounds Racing Hall of Fame (2000)
- Last updated on October 30, 2021

Grindstone (January 23, 1993 – March 22, 2022) was a Thoroughbred racehorse, best known for winning the 1996 Kentucky Derby.

== Background ==
Bred and owned by William T. Young's Overbrook Farm, Grindstone was the son of Unbridled out of the mare Buzz My Bell. Buzz My Bell's dam was a half-sister to La Grue, the dam of the Belmont Stakes winner Pass Catcher.

Upon the death of Go for Gin on March 8, 2022, Grindstone became the oldest living winner of the Kentucky Derby as well as any of the Triple Crown of Thoroughbred Racing races.

== Racing career ==
As a three-year-old, Grindstone won the Louisiana Derby and was second in the Arkansas Derby. He then won the 1996 Kentucky Derby with a time of 2:01.06, edging Cavonnier at the wire by a nose. He was jockey Jerry Bailey's second Kentucky Derby winner, and the second in a row for trainer D. Wayne Lukas.

Grindstone was retired five days after his Kentucky Derby victory, when a bone chip was discovered in his knee. He was the first horse since Bubbling Over in 1926 to be retired immediately following a win in the Kentucky Derby.

== Race record ==
Date	Age	Distance	Race	Grade	Track	Odds	Field	Finish	Winning Time	Winning (Losing) Margin	Jockey	Ref
Jun 11, 1995	2	5 furlongs	Maiden Special Weight	Maiden	Belmont Park	3.05	5	1	0:59.09	5 lengths	Jose Santos	
Jul 11, 1995	2	6 furlongs	Bashford Manor Stakes	III	Churchill Downs	*0.90	8	4	1:11.40	(1 1/4 lengths)	Donna Barton	
Feb 16, 1996	3	1 mile	Allowance	Allowance	Santa Anita Park	*1.60	7	2	1:36.01	(3 lengths)	Gary Stevens	
Mar 17, 1996	3	1 1/16 miles	Louisiana Derby	III	Fair Grounds (Louisiana)	2.40	8	1	1:42.79	3 1/2 lengths	Jerry Bailey	
Apr 13, 1996	3	1 1/8 miles	Arkansas Derby	II	Oaklawn Park	*1.60	12	2	1:49.21	(neck)	Jerry Bailey	
May 4, 1996	3	1 1/4 miles	Kentucky Derby	I	Churchill Downs	5.90	19	1	2:01.06	nose	Jerry Bailey	

== Stud record ==
Grindstone initially retired to Overbrook Farm in Lexington, Kentucky, where he stood until 2009, when Overbrook Farm was sold. His initial stud fee was $25,000.

Grindstone moved to Oakhurst Farm in Oregon, making him the first Kentucky Derby winner to ever stand in the Northwest. He stood for $2,500. He was in the top three Oregon sires every year from 2009 to 2020.

His progeny include two millionaires, GR I winner Birdstone and Ekolu Place. He is also, via Birdstone, the grandsire of Mine That Bird and Summer Bird, who both won Triple Crown races in 2009.

== Pedigree ==
Pedigree of Grindstone (USA), bay stallion, 1993
Sire Unbridled (USA) 1987	Fappiano (USA); 1977	Mr Prospector	Raise A Native
Sire Unbridled (USA) 1987	Fappiano (USA); 1977	Mr Prospector	Gold Digger
Sire Unbridled (USA) 1987	Fappiano (USA); 1977	Killalde	Dr Fager
Sire Unbridled (USA) 1987	Fappiano (USA); 1977	Killalde	Grand Splendor
Sire Unbridled (USA) 1987	Gana Facil (USA); 1981	Le Fabuleux	Wild Risk
Sire Unbridled (USA) 1987	Gana Facil (USA); 1981	Le Fabuleux	Anguar
Sire Unbridled (USA) 1987	Gana Facil (USA); 1981	Charedi	In Reality
Sire Unbridled (USA) 1987	Gana Facil (USA); 1981	Charedi	Magic
Dam Buzz My Bell (USA) 1981	Drone (USA); 1966	Sir Gaylord	Turn-To
Dam Buzz My Bell (USA) 1981	Drone (USA); 1966	Sir Gaylord	Somethingroyal
Dam Buzz My Bell (USA) 1981	Drone (USA); 1966	Cap and Bells	Tom Fool
Dam Buzz My Bell (USA) 1981	Drone (USA); 1966	Cap and Bells	Ghazni
Dam Buzz My Bell (USA) 1981	Chateaupavia (USA); 1966	Chateaugay	Swaps
Dam Buzz My Bell (USA) 1981	Chateaupavia (USA); 1966	Chateaugay	Banquet Bell
Dam Buzz My Bell (USA) 1981	Chateaupavia (USA); 1966	Glenpavia	Pavot
Dam Buzz My Bell (USA) 1981	Chateaupavia (USA); 1966	Glenpavia	Gaffery (Family:1-c)
